= List of historic properties in Phoenix =

List of historic properties in Phoenix, Arizona
- City
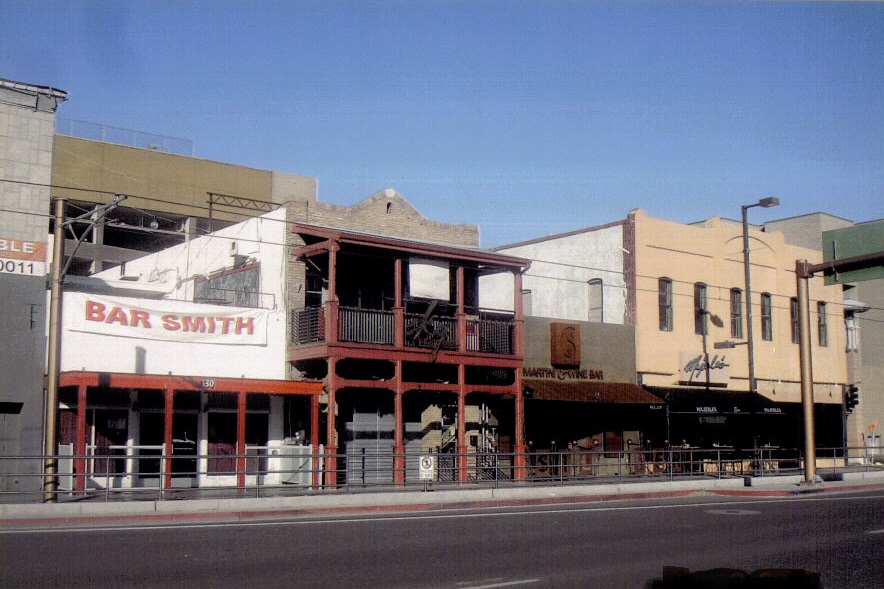
- Historic Washington Street

- Location in Maricopa County and the state of Arizona

This is a list, which includes photographic galleries, of some of the remaining historic structures and monuments, of historic significance, in Phoenix, Arizona, United States. Included are photographs of properties identified by the African, Asian and Hispanic historic property surveys of the City of Phoenix, focusing on the themes of history in Phoenix from 1870 to 1975.

This list however, is not limited to historical structures and monuments. Also listed are historical landmarks, some of which are listed in the National Register of Historic Places such as the Pueblo Grande Ruin and Irrigation Sites and the Deer Valley Rock Art Center. These contain the ruins of structures and artifacts of the Hohokam who lived within the modern Phoenix city area before the arrival of the settlers of non-Native American origin.

The abandoned Joint Head Dam and the early canals built by the early pioneers of European descent played an important role in the irrigation and development of Phoenix and its surrounding areas. Pictured is the ruins of the abandoned Joint Head Dam built in 1884. Also, pictured is the Grand Canal, the oldest canal in Phoenix which was built by the pioneers in 1877, and the Old Crosscut Canal, built in 1888.

Included in this list are the photographs of the final resting place of various notable people who are interred in Phoenix's historic cemeteries who were of historical importance to Phoenix and Arizona. According to the definition by the "Pioneers' Cemetery Association (PCA)" a "historic cemetery" is one which has been in existence for more than fifty years. Among the cemeteries listed is the abandoned Crosscut Cemetery which was established in 1870 and therefore, Phoenix's oldest cemetery and the Pioneer and Military Memorial Park, which is listed in the National Register of Historic Places.

Listed are some museums in Phoenix with the images of artifacts of historical importance. Such is the case of the Phoenix Trolley Museum where the historic Trolley Car #116 is showcased. Among the museums are the Martin Auto Museum, which showcases automobiles from 1886 onward and the Musical Instrument Museum.

Laveen and the Sunnyslope District are listed separately because these were two areas whose citizens wanted to proclaim the areas as independent towns, but whose areas were instead merged into the city of Phoenix.

== Phoenix ==
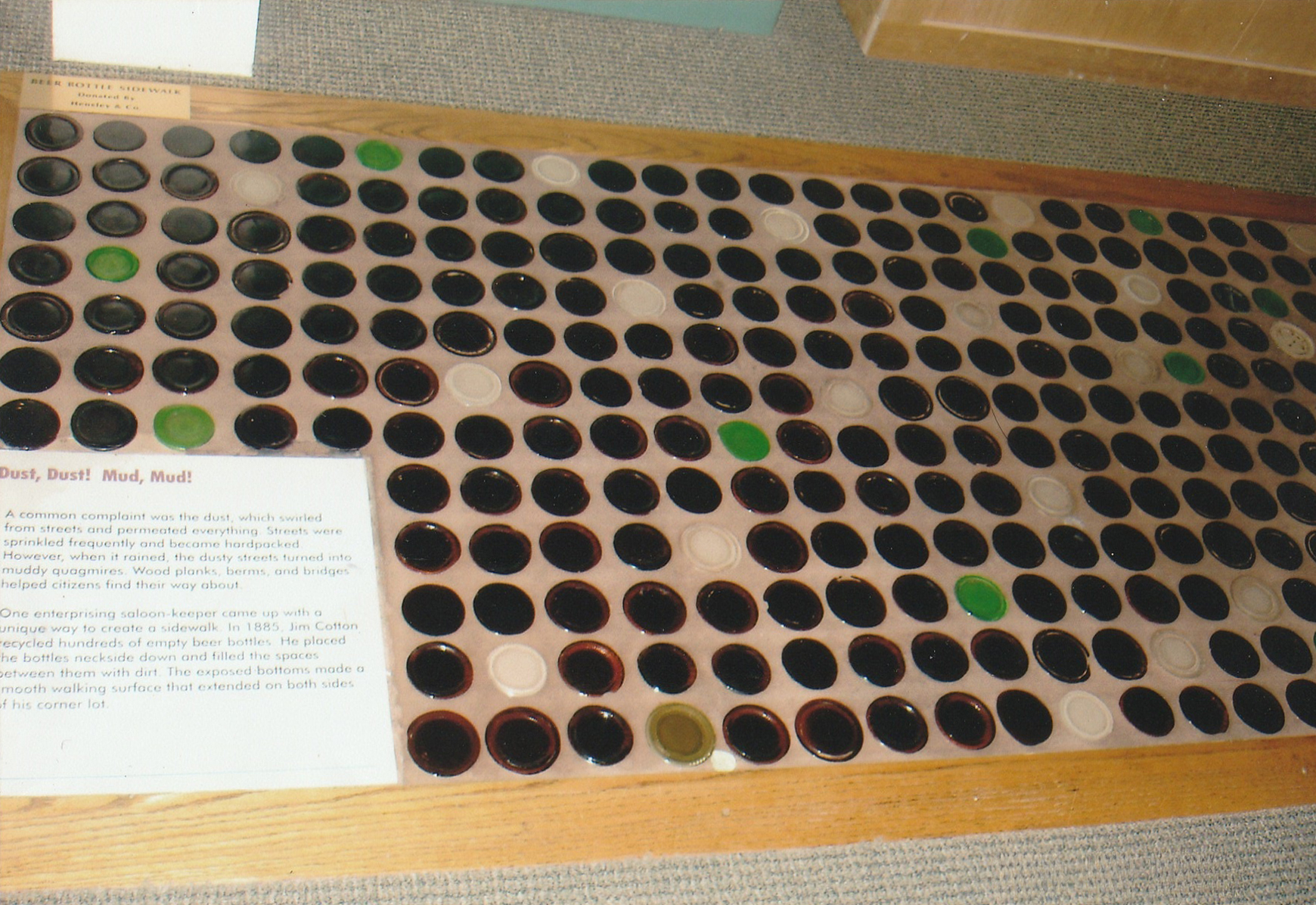
Jim Cotton's Saloon Beer Bottle Sidewalk-1885

Phoenix is the capital, and largest city, of the U.S. state of Arizona. Phoenix was incorporated as a city in 1881, after being founded in 1867 near the Salt River close to its confluence with the Gila River. The city has numerous historic properties which have been listed in the National Register of Historic Places. There are also 33 landmarks and attractions within Phoenix that are claimed to represent the best features of the city. These have been designated as "Phoenix Points of Pride" and/or are listed in the Phoenix Historic Property Register. The Phoenix Historic Property Register, was established in 1986. It is the city's official listing of the historic and prehistoric properties that have been deemed worthy of preservation. Some of these properties are listed in both the National Register of Historic Places and in the Phoenix Historic Property Register.

Historic Heritage Square is part of the Heritage and Science Park on the east end of downtown. It encompasses the only remaining group of residential structures from the original town site of Phoenix. The images of these properties with a short description of the same are included.

=== Vanishing Phoenix ===
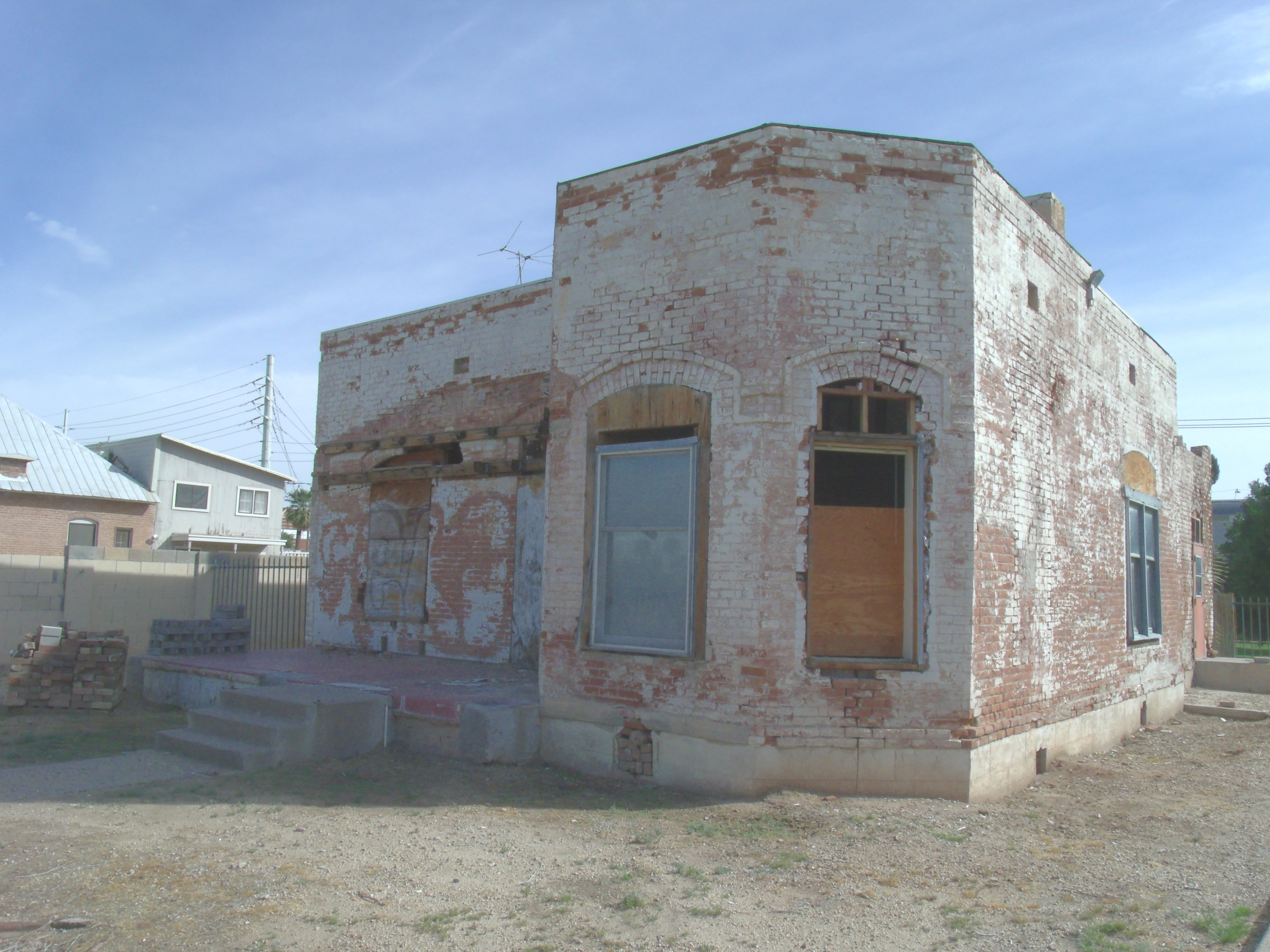
The Clinton Campbell House

According to Robert A. Melikian, author of the book Vanishing Phoenix, Phoenix's preservation office does not have the ability to deny a demolition permit. Therefore, the owner of a property, listed either in the National Register of Historic Places or the Phoenix Historic Property Register, may demolish the historical property. Entire neighborhoods, such as Golden Gate, where members of the minority communities lived have been razed. Both the residence of former Territorial Governor Joseph Kibbey located at 1334 E. Jefferson St. which served as the home and medical practice of Dr. Winston C. Hackett, the first African-American physician in Arizona and the building located at 1342 E. Jefferson St. where Hackett founded the Booker T. Washington Memorial Hospital were demolished. The historic St. James Hotel is an example of a building listed in the National Register of Historic Places which will be demolished, despite the protests of preservation groups, to make way for a VIP parking lot for the Phoenix Suns season ticket holders. Among the properties which are listed in the National Register of Historic Places and which have been demolished are the following:

- Arizona Citrus Growers Association Warehouse-601 E. Jackson Street.
- Concrete Block House – 618-620 N. 4th Avenue.
- Higuera Grocery – 923 S. 2nd Avenue.
- Lightning Delivery Co. Warehouse-425 E. Jackson Street.
- Overland Arizona Co. – 12 N. 4th Avenue.
- Judge W. H. Stillwell House – 2039 W. Monroe Street.
- Clinton Campbell House – 361 N. 4th Avenue.

Some of the historic houses and buildings which are listed in the National Register of Historic Places and/ or the Phoenix Historic Property Register are also listed in the "enDangered Dozen Historic Places List," released by the Phoenix Historic Neighborhoods Coalition. These structures are prone to vandalism and the elements. Among the structures which are neglected and are at the highest risk of disappearing in the near future are the following:

- The Steinegger Lodge, built in 1889 and located at 27 E. Monroe St.
- The William R. Norton House, built in 1895 and located at 2222 W. Washington St.
- The Charles Pugh House, built in 1897 and located at 356 N. Second Avenue / 362 N. Second Avenue. (The 356 address is how the records show the house today. It was listed as 362 in older records.)
- The Louis Emerson House, built in 1902 and located at 623 N. Fourth St.
- The Concrete Block Bungalow, built in 1908 and located at 606 N. 9th St.
- The Leighton G. Knipe House, built in 1909 and located at 1025 N. 2nd Avenue.
- The Sach's-Webster Farmstead House, built in 1909 and located in the Northwest corner of 75th Avenue and Baseline.
- The Sarah Pemberton House, built in 1920 and located at 1121 N. 2nd St.
- Mrs. Neal House, built in 1920 and located at 102 East Willetta Street.

=== Pueblo Grande Ruin ===
The Pueblo Grande Ruin is the remains of a 450 BC prehistoric Hohokam village. For unknown reasons the site was abandoned by 1450 AD. These are some of the ruins of the Hohokam structures which were unearthed and which are situated in the Pueblo Grande Museum & Archaeological Park.

Historic Pueblo Grande Ruins in Phoenix, Arizona
Listed in the National Register of Historic Places
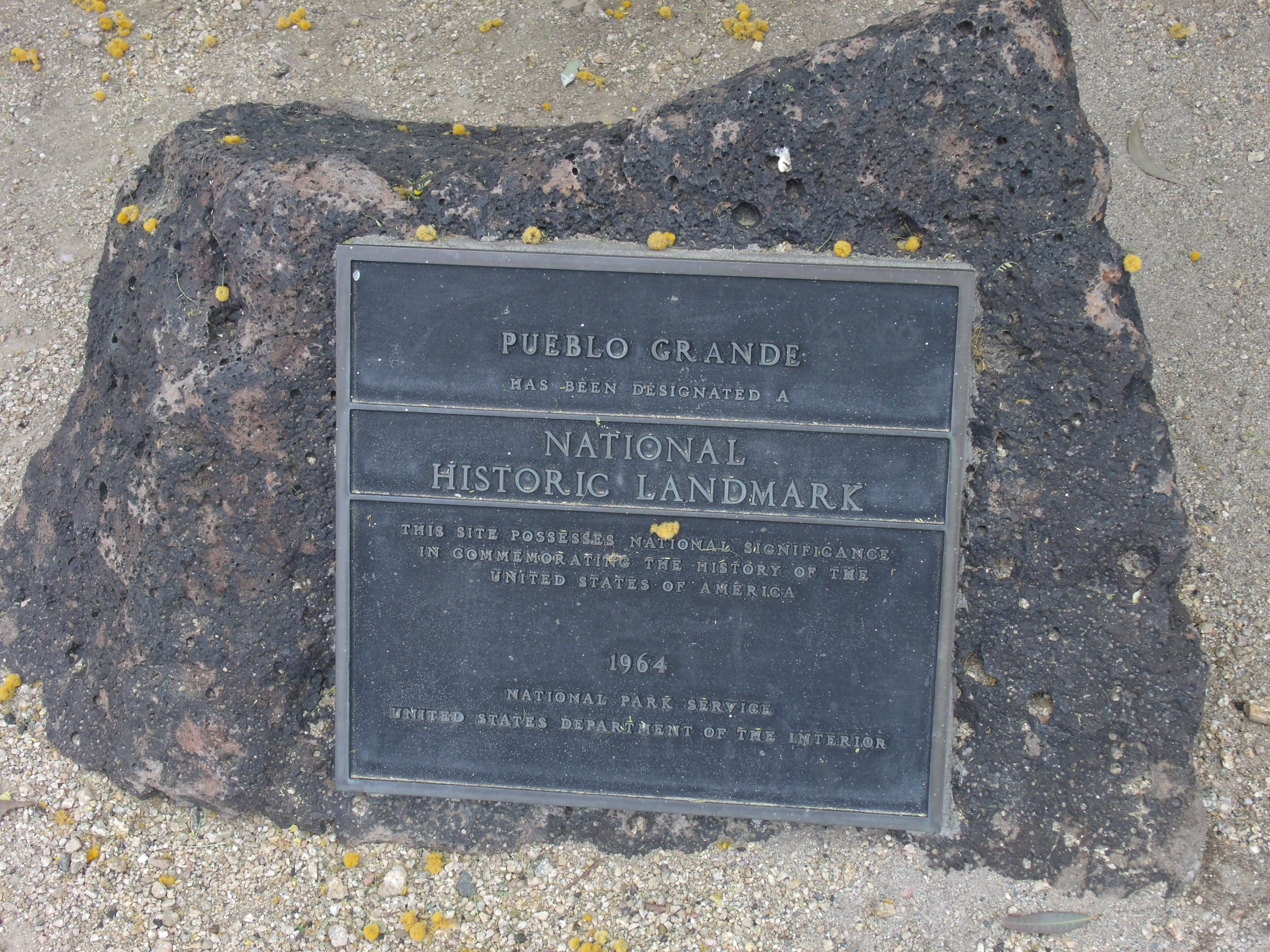
Pueblo Grande Ruin National Historic Landmark Marker. Marker and contents are the work of the US Dept. of the Interior, therefore PD.

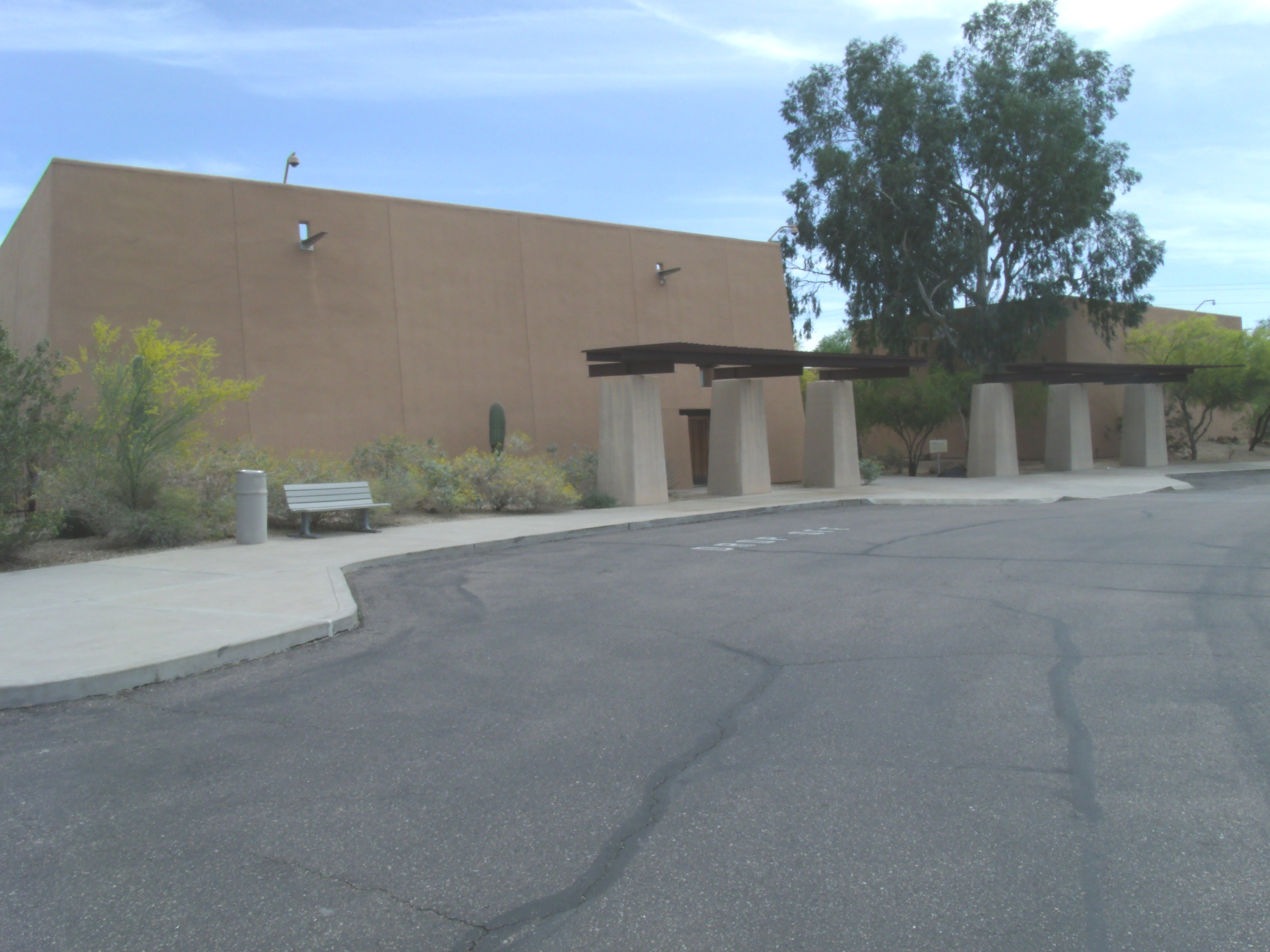
The Pueblo Grande Ruin Museum is located at 4619 E. Washington St. in Phoenix, Arizona. The ruins are listed in the National Register of Historic Places reference #66000184.

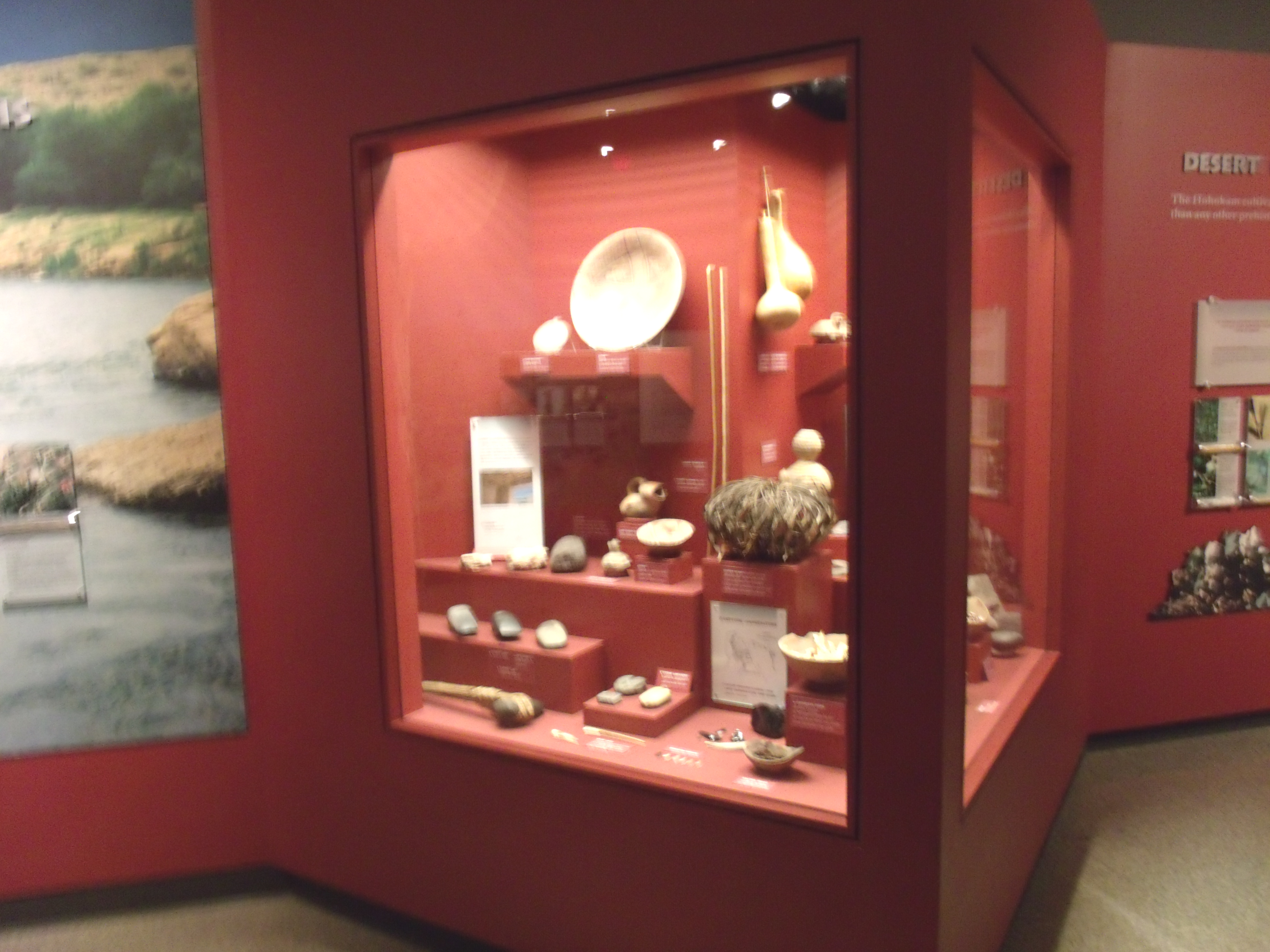
Artifacts displayed inside the Pueblo Grande Ruin-Museum

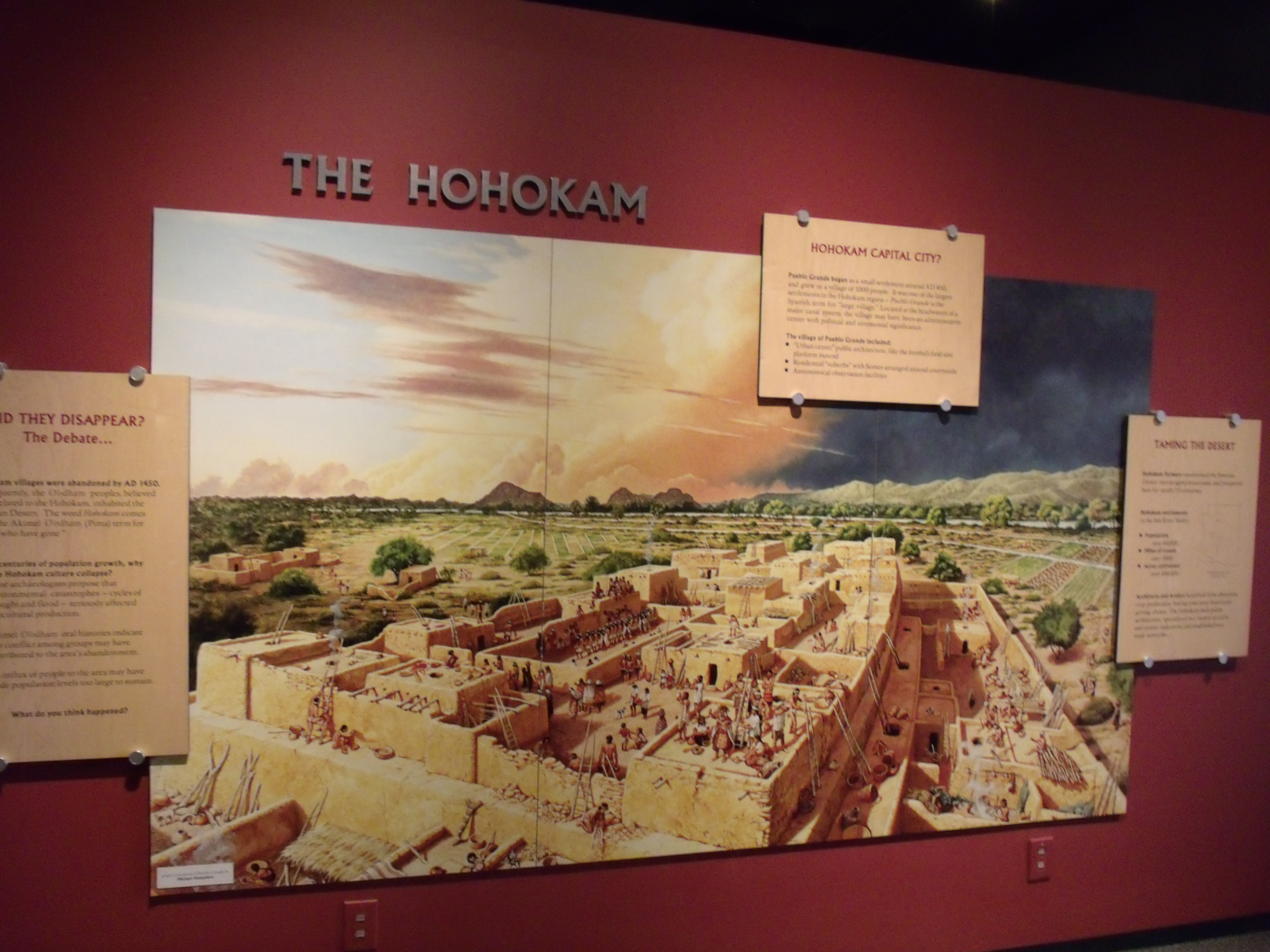
Display inside the Pueblo Grande Ruin Museum.

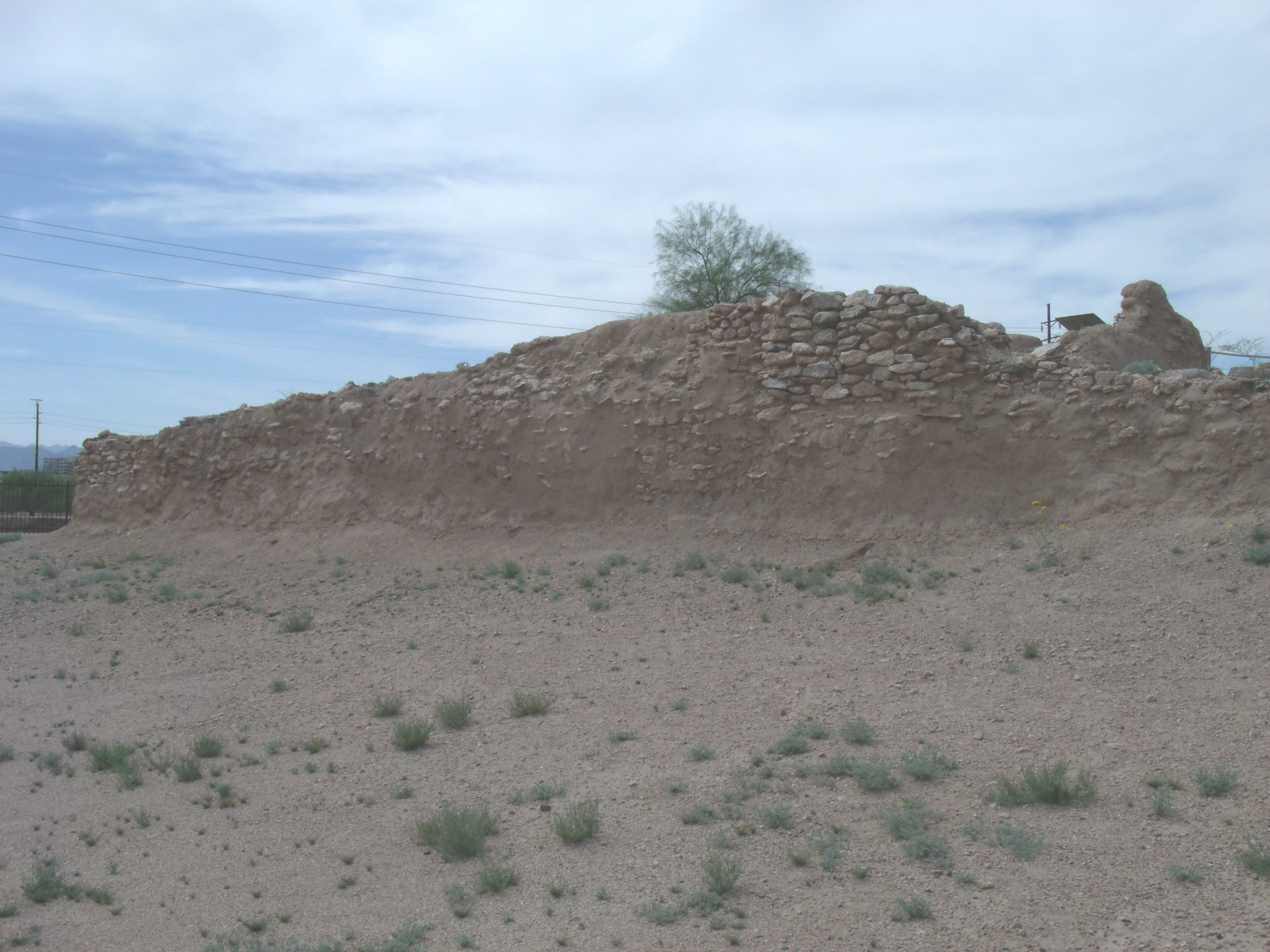
Hohokam's of power and influence lived in houses surrounded by mounds.

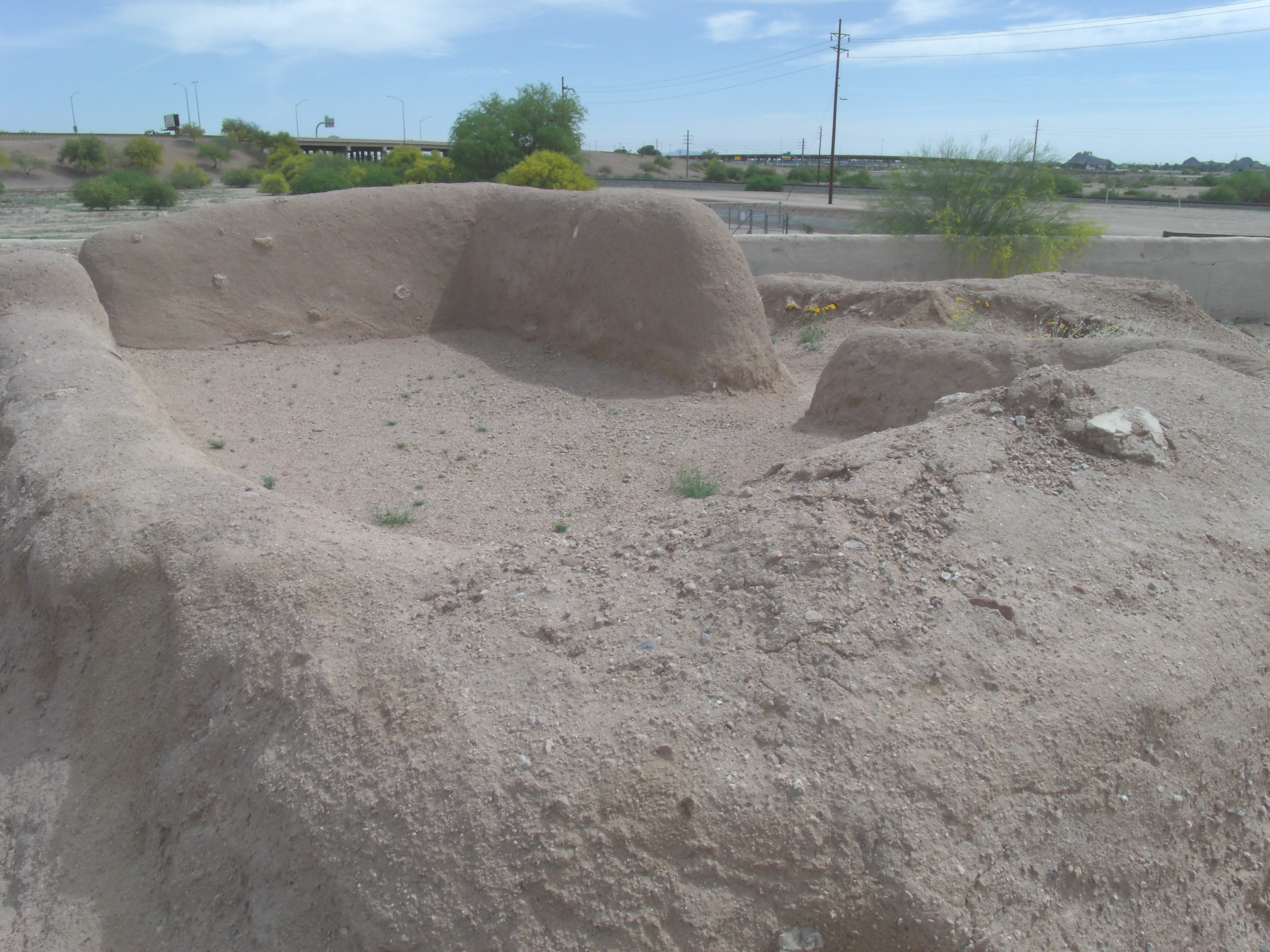
On the sunrise in the summer solstice and in the winter solstice an alignment occurs. A shaft of light stretches from one doorway to another, signaling the mid points of the solar annual cycle.

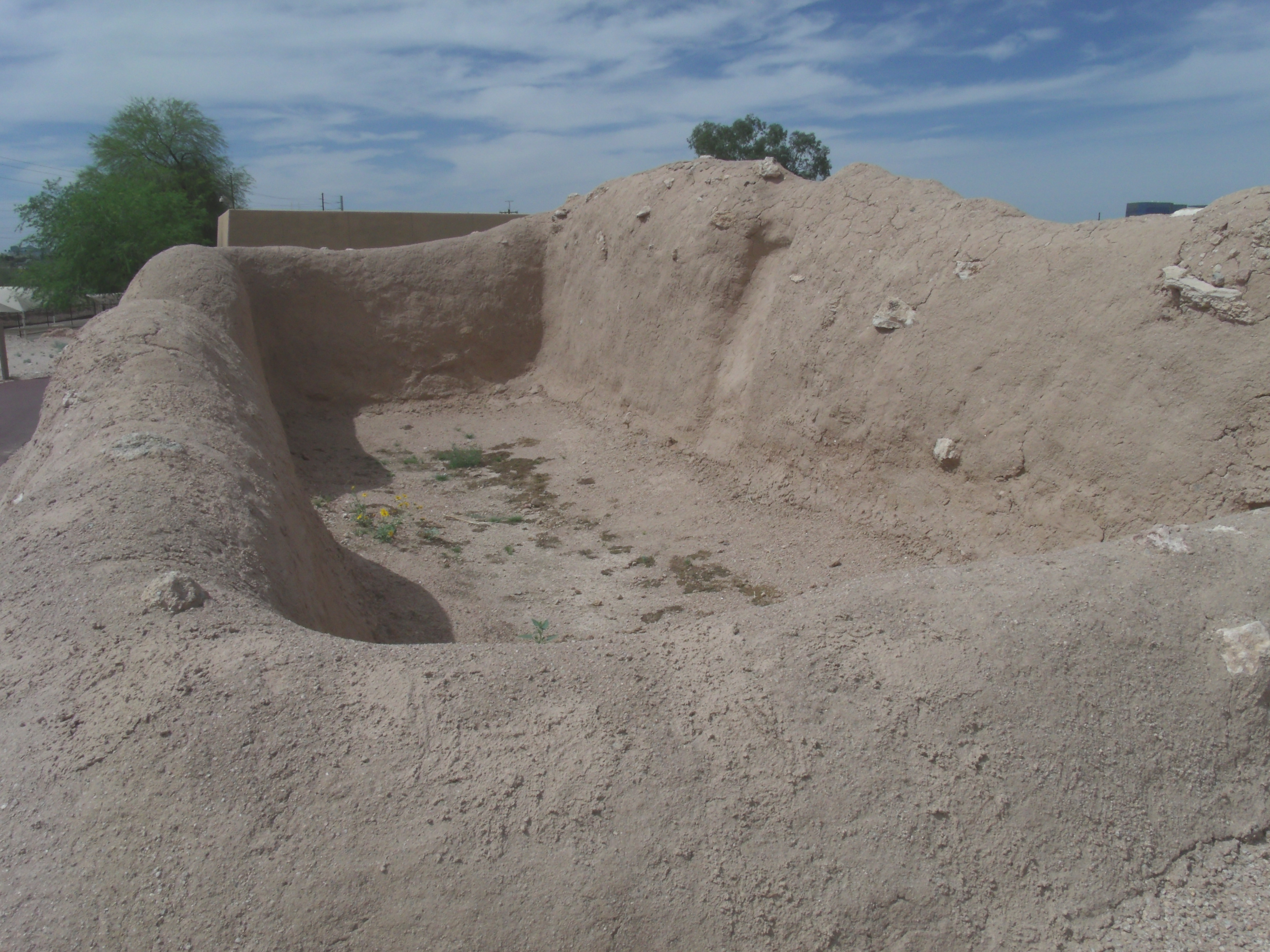
Tools and weapons were stored in these rooms.

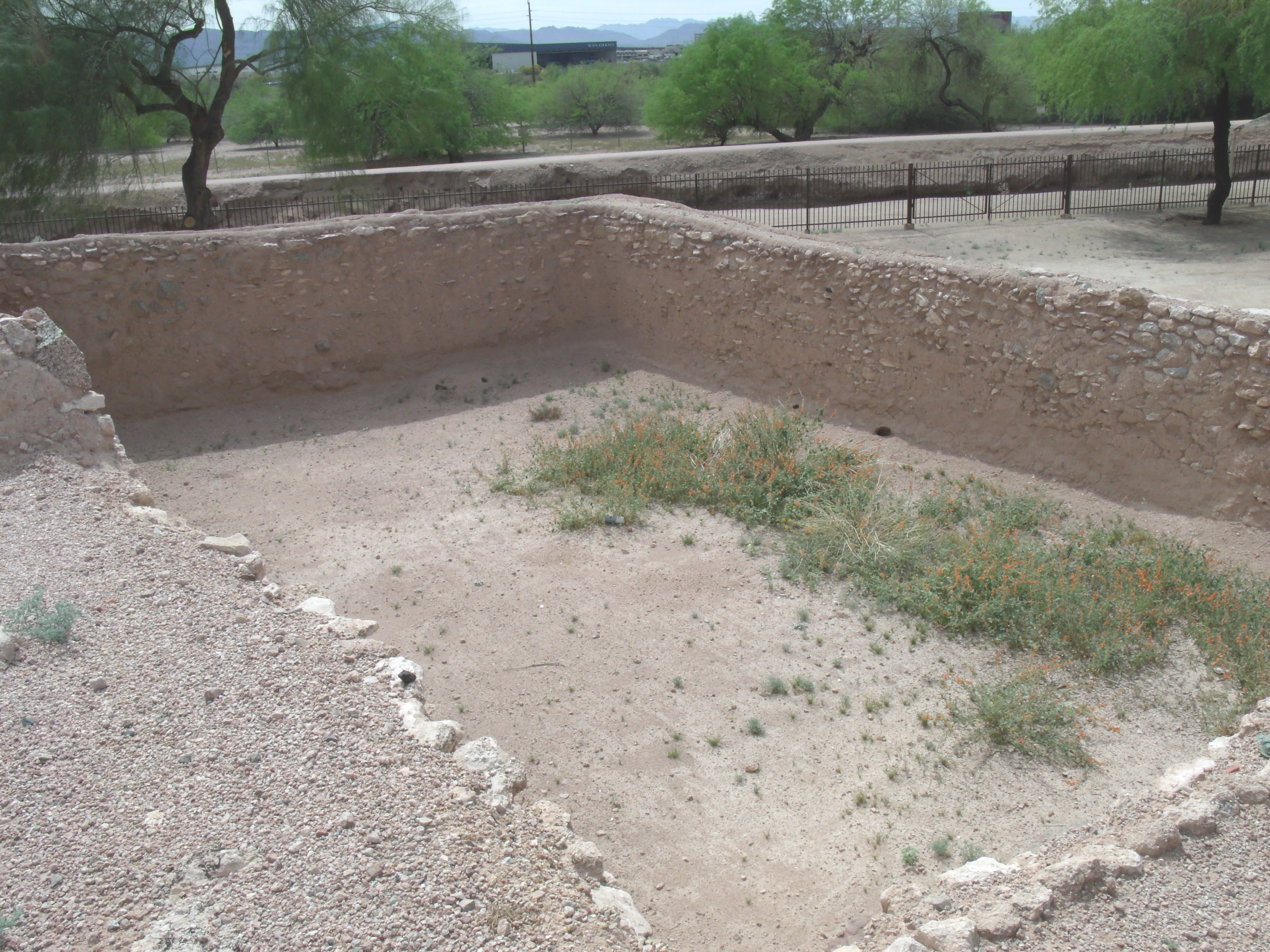
These rooms were large and had eight foot walls. Artifacts were kept in them.

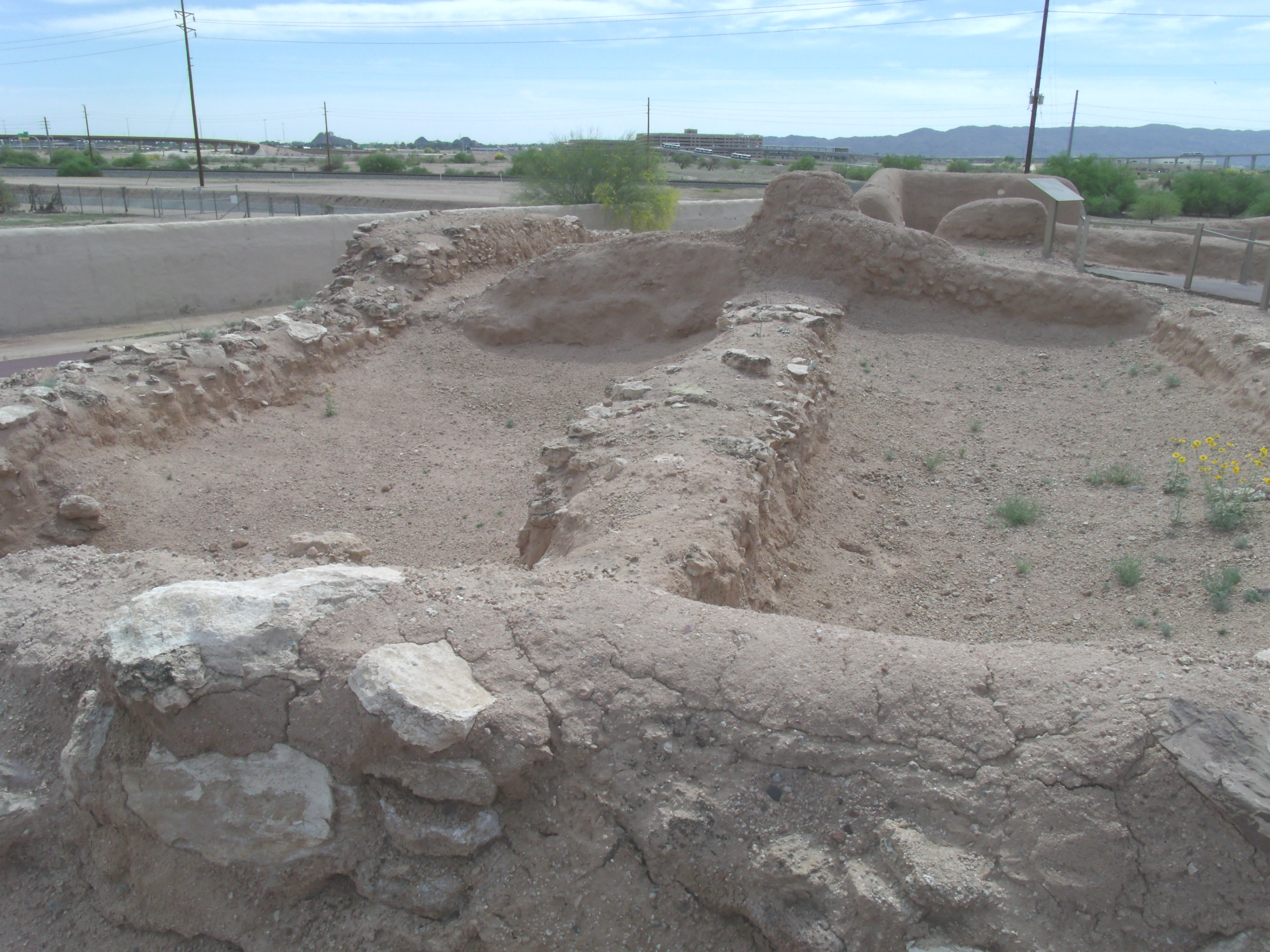
Miller's Room was named after Dr. Joshua Miller, President of Arizona Antiquarian Association, who 1901 conducted the first excavation of the Pueblo Grande Ruins.

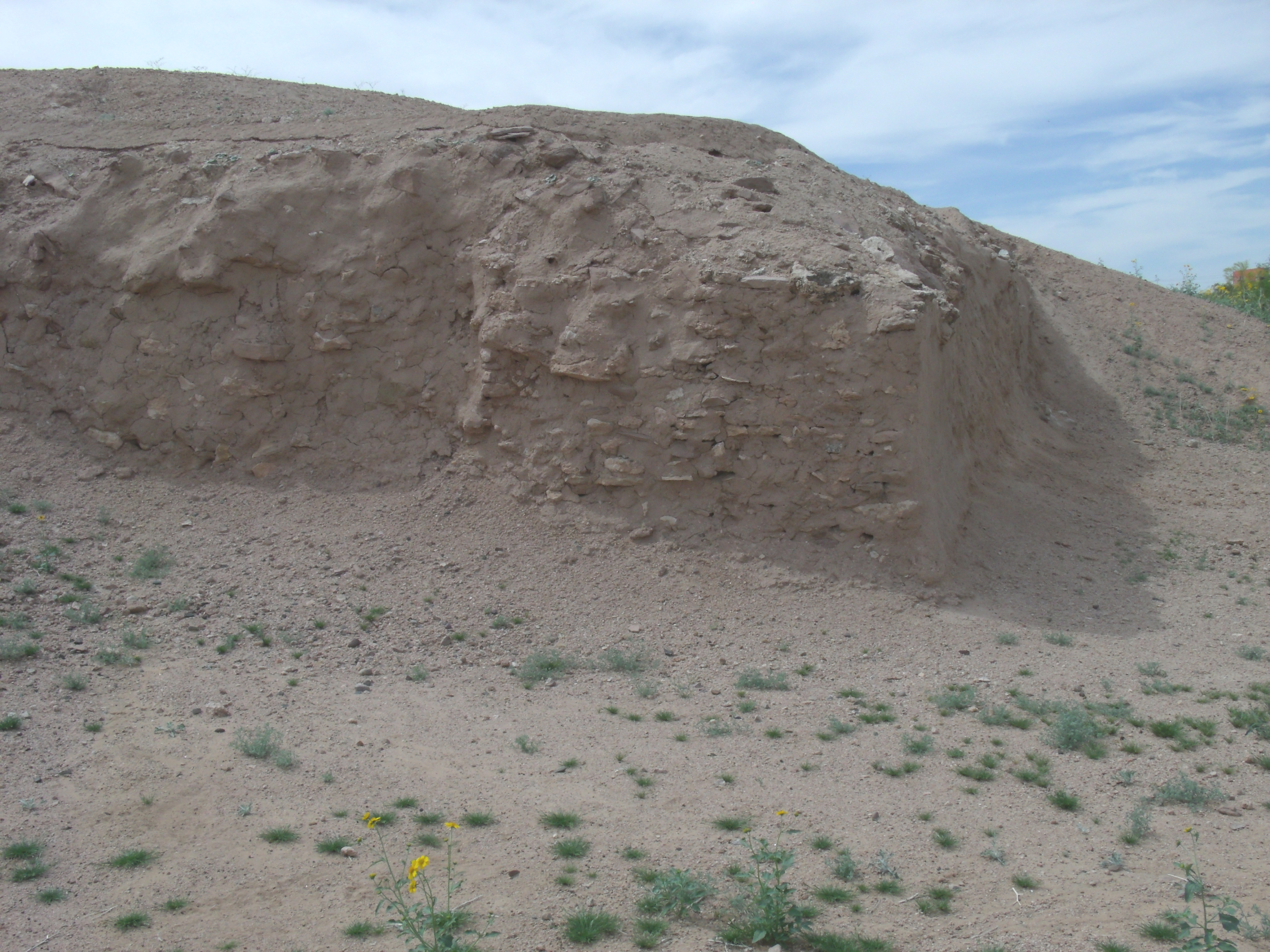
This is the largest mound in the Pueblo Grande Ruin.

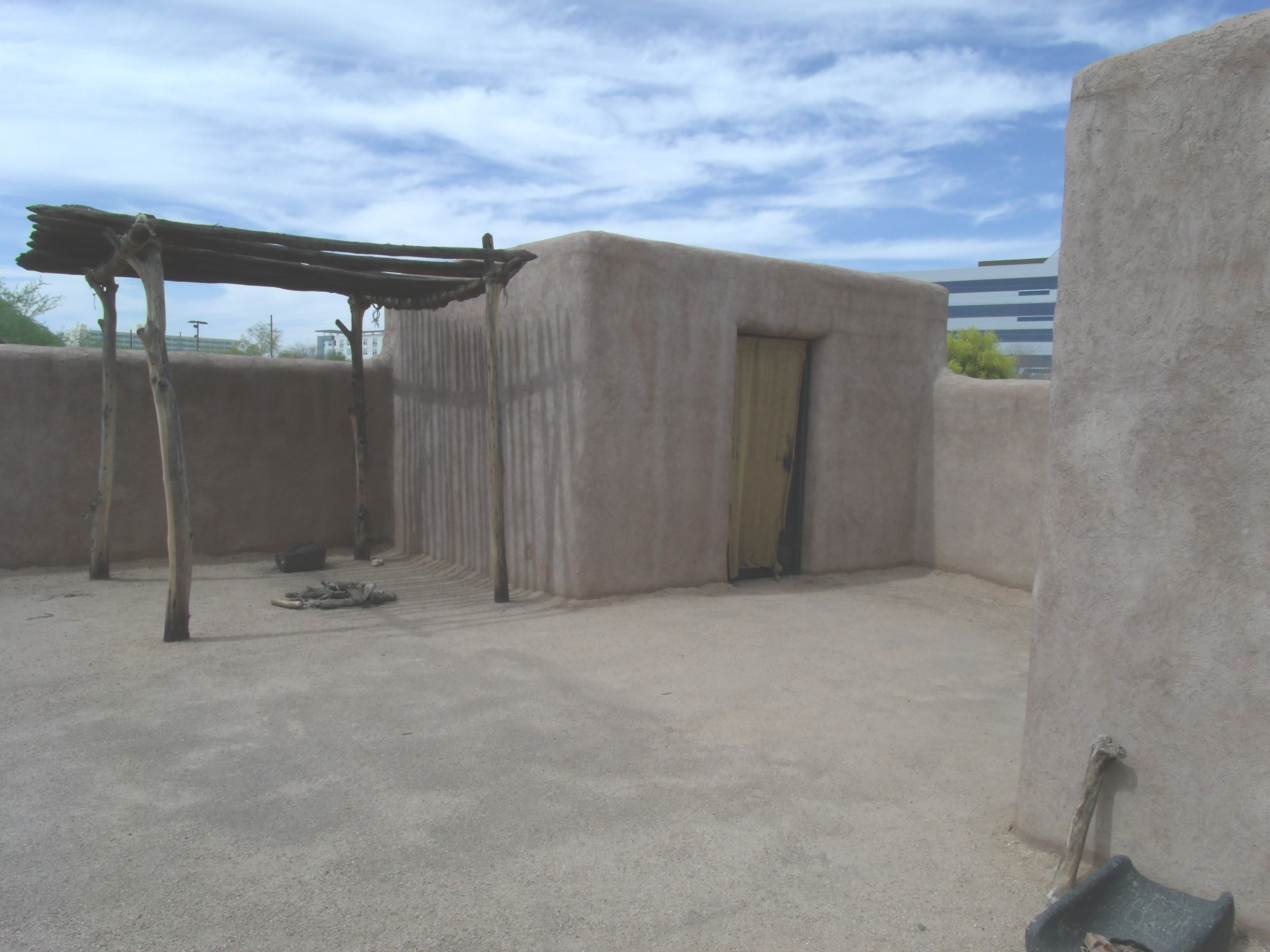
This is a representation of what a Hohokam house looked like 700 years ago.

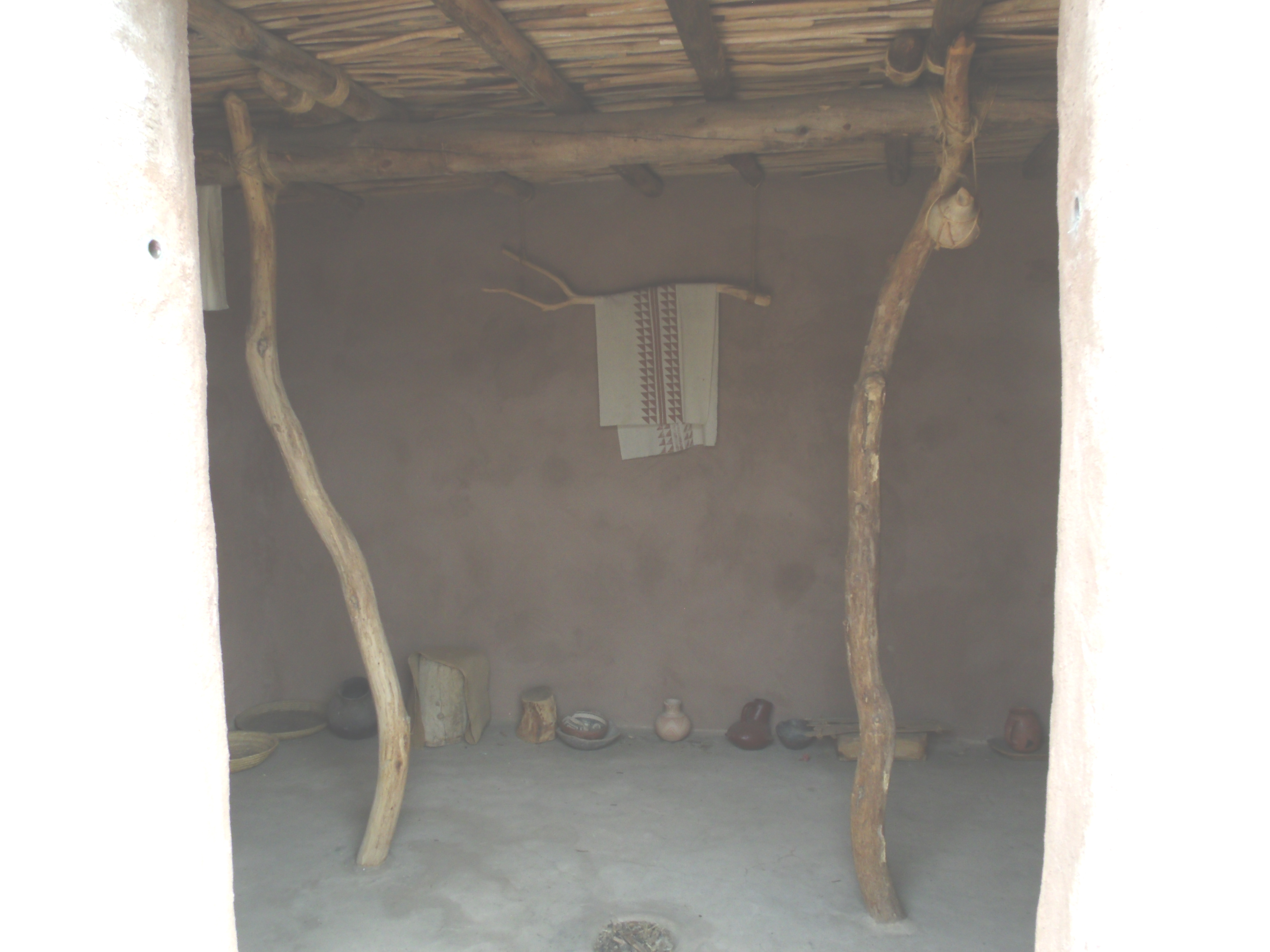
Inside view of the Adobe Compound Replica.

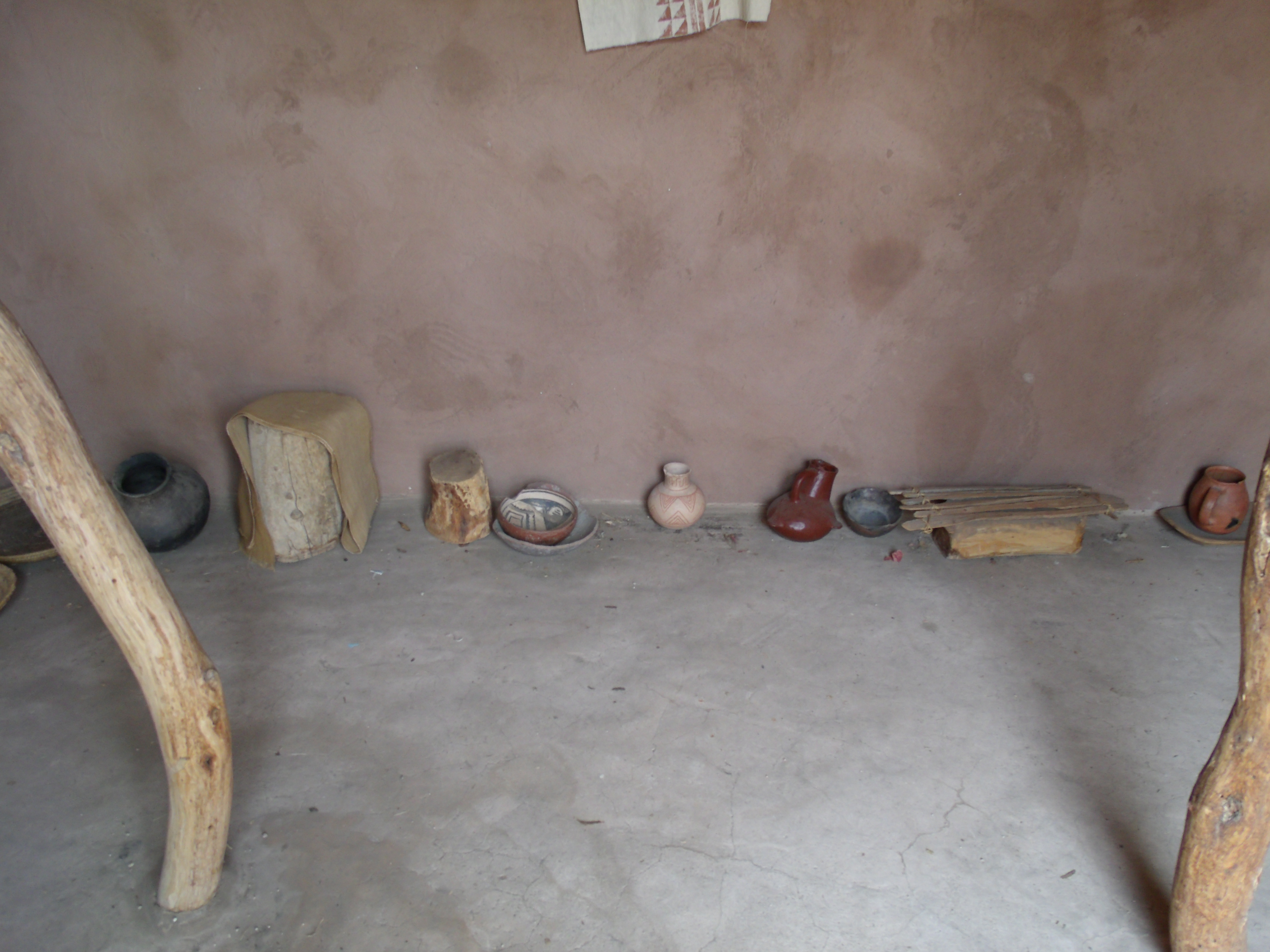
Artifacts inside of the Adobe Compound Replica.

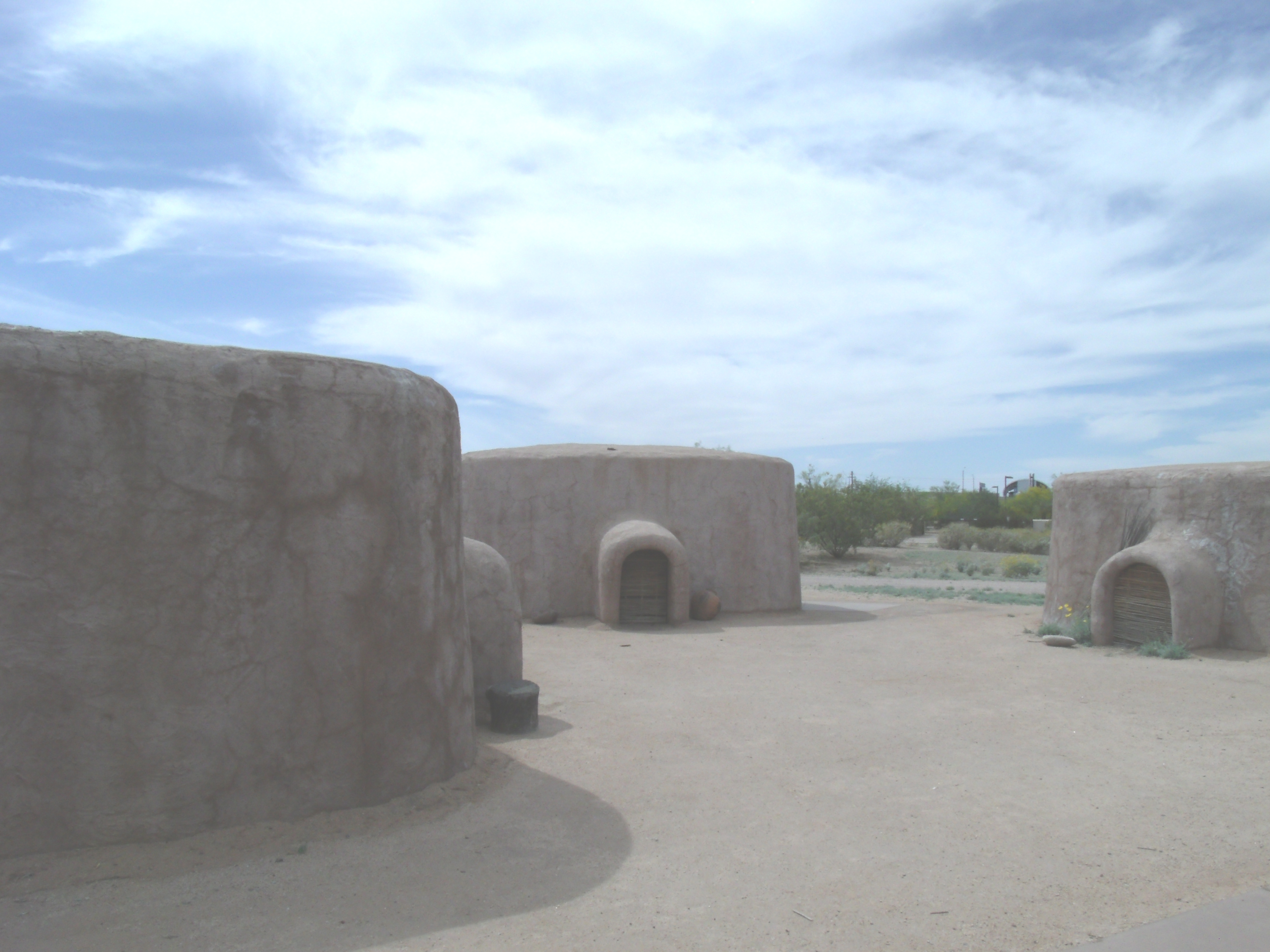
These replicas represent what the Hohokam pit houses looked like 1000 years ago.

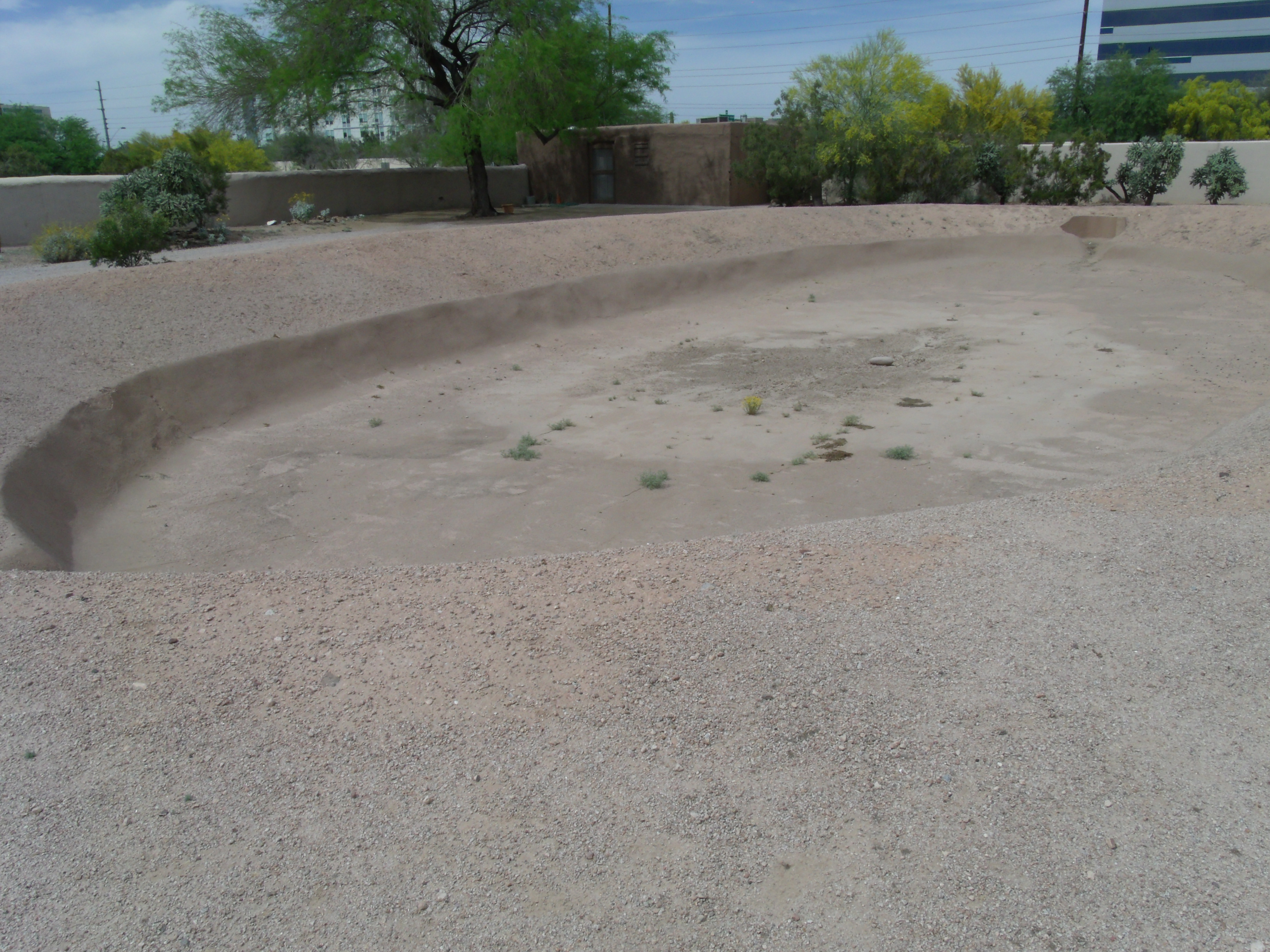
This was a Hohokam ballpark where they played ceremonial ball games. The villagers stood on top of the surrounding mound to observe the game.

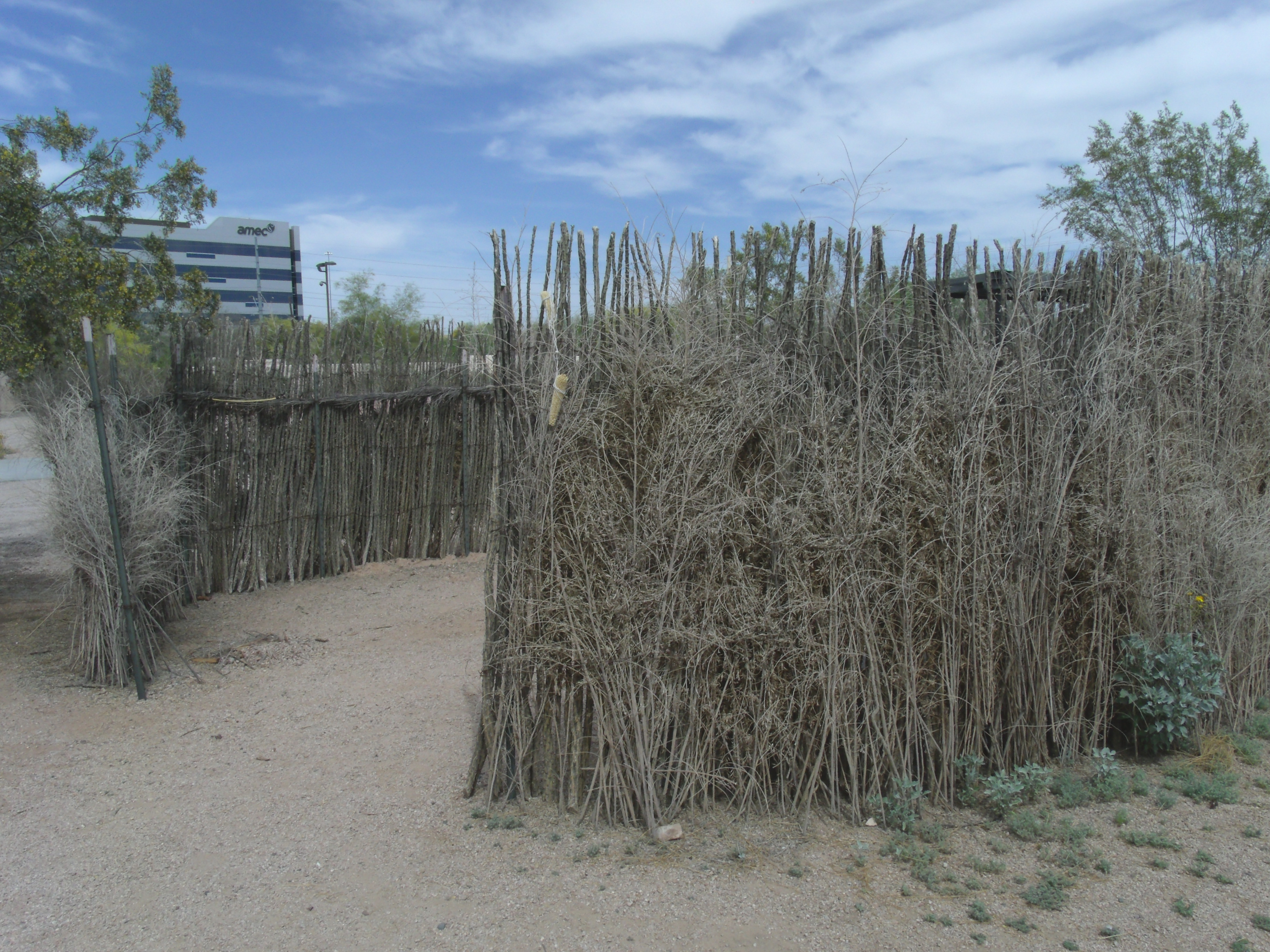
Made from mesquite, these kitchens were used by the O'odham people, believed to be descendants of the Hohokam, in the 1600s.

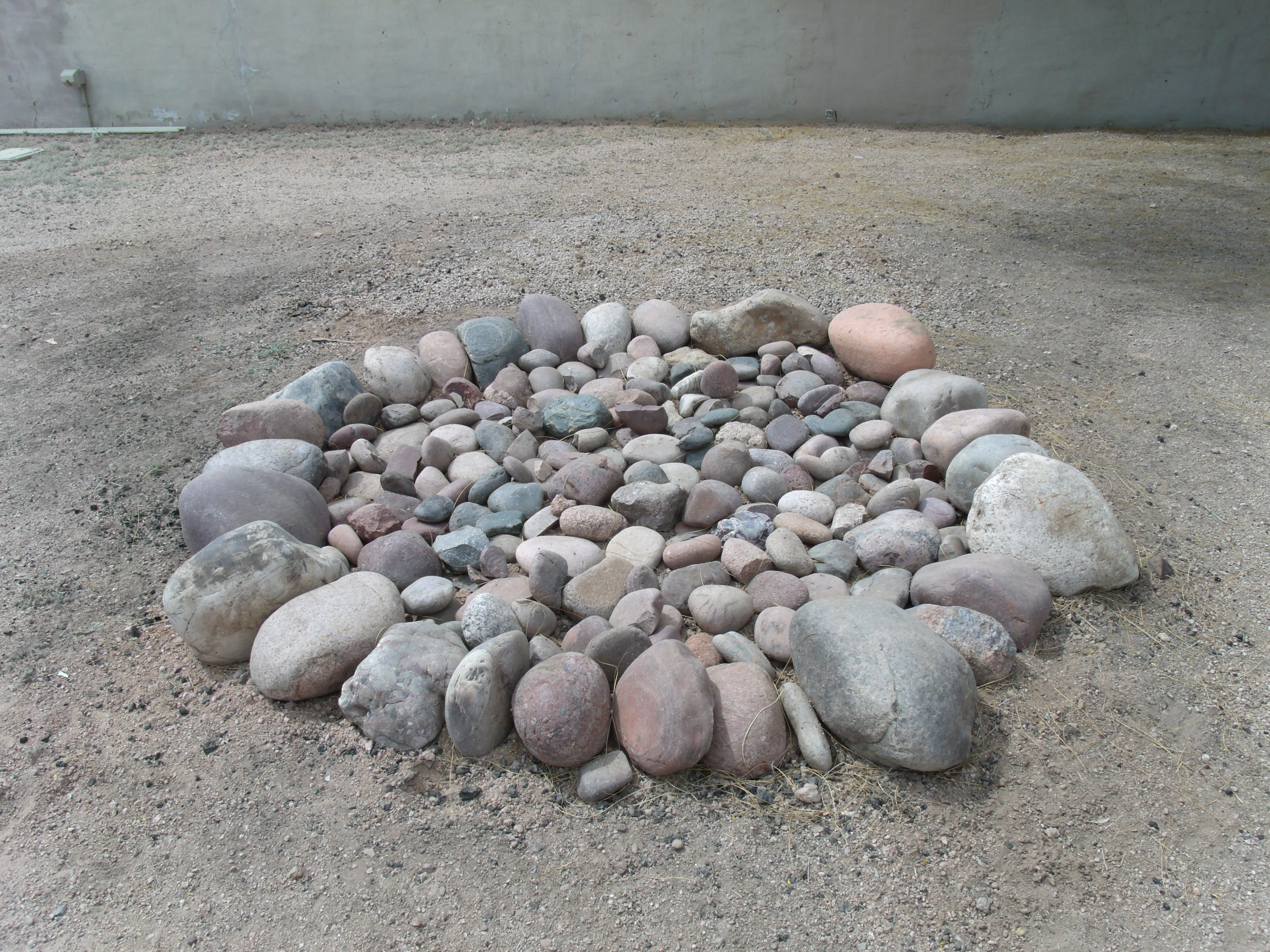
The ovens was shared by the Hohokam community.

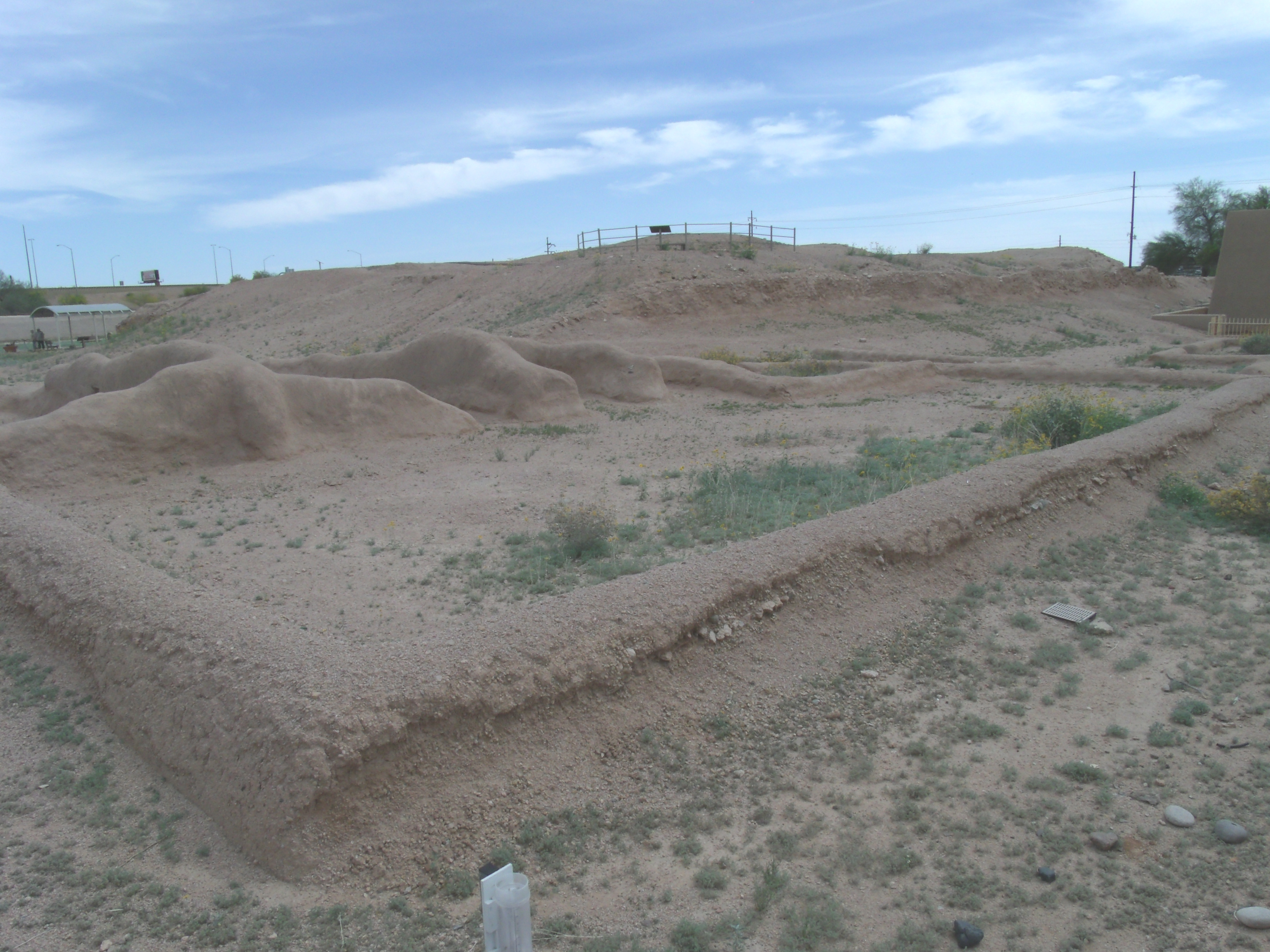
Partial view of the Hohokam Village.

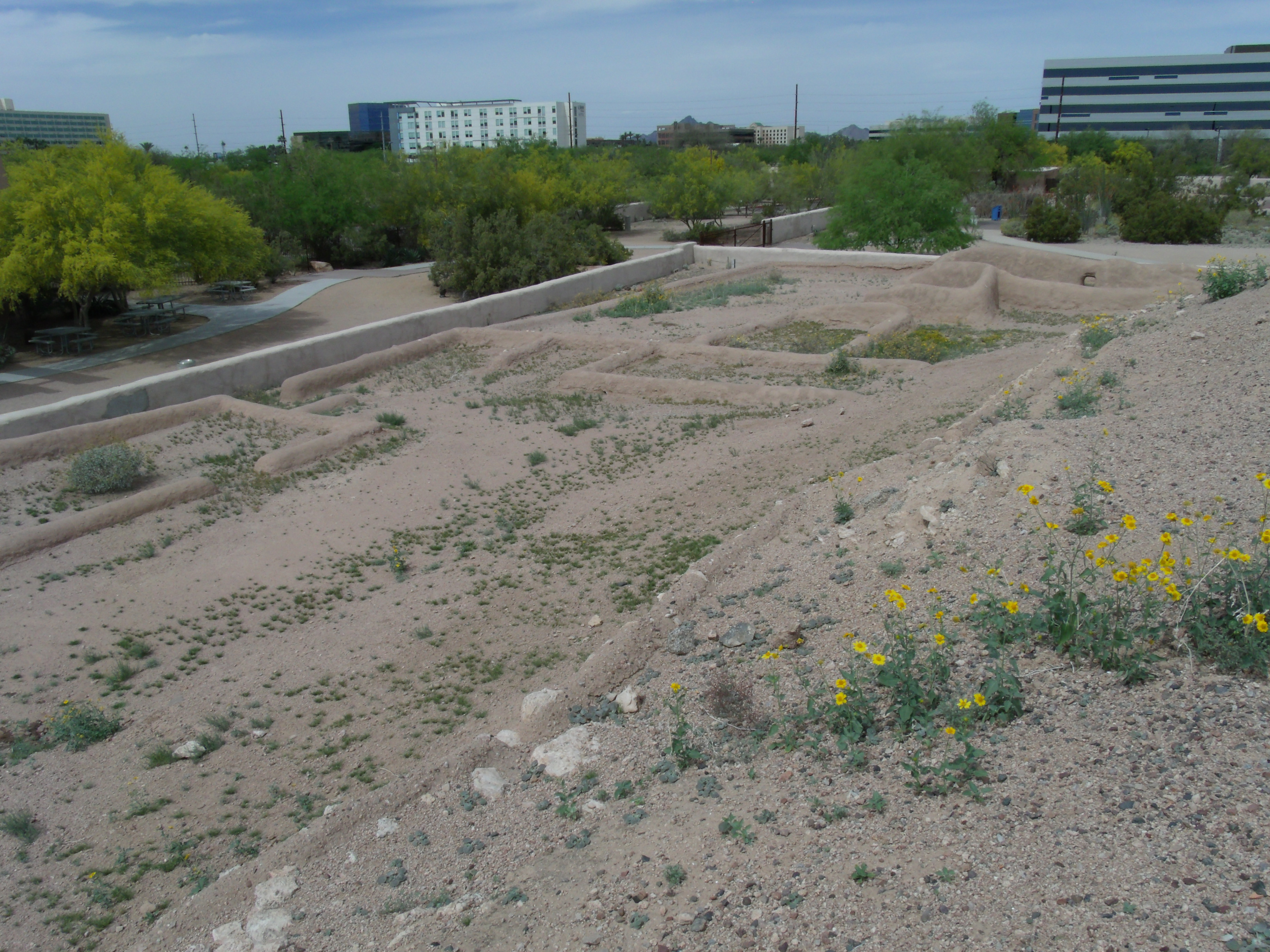
Different view of the Hohokam Village.

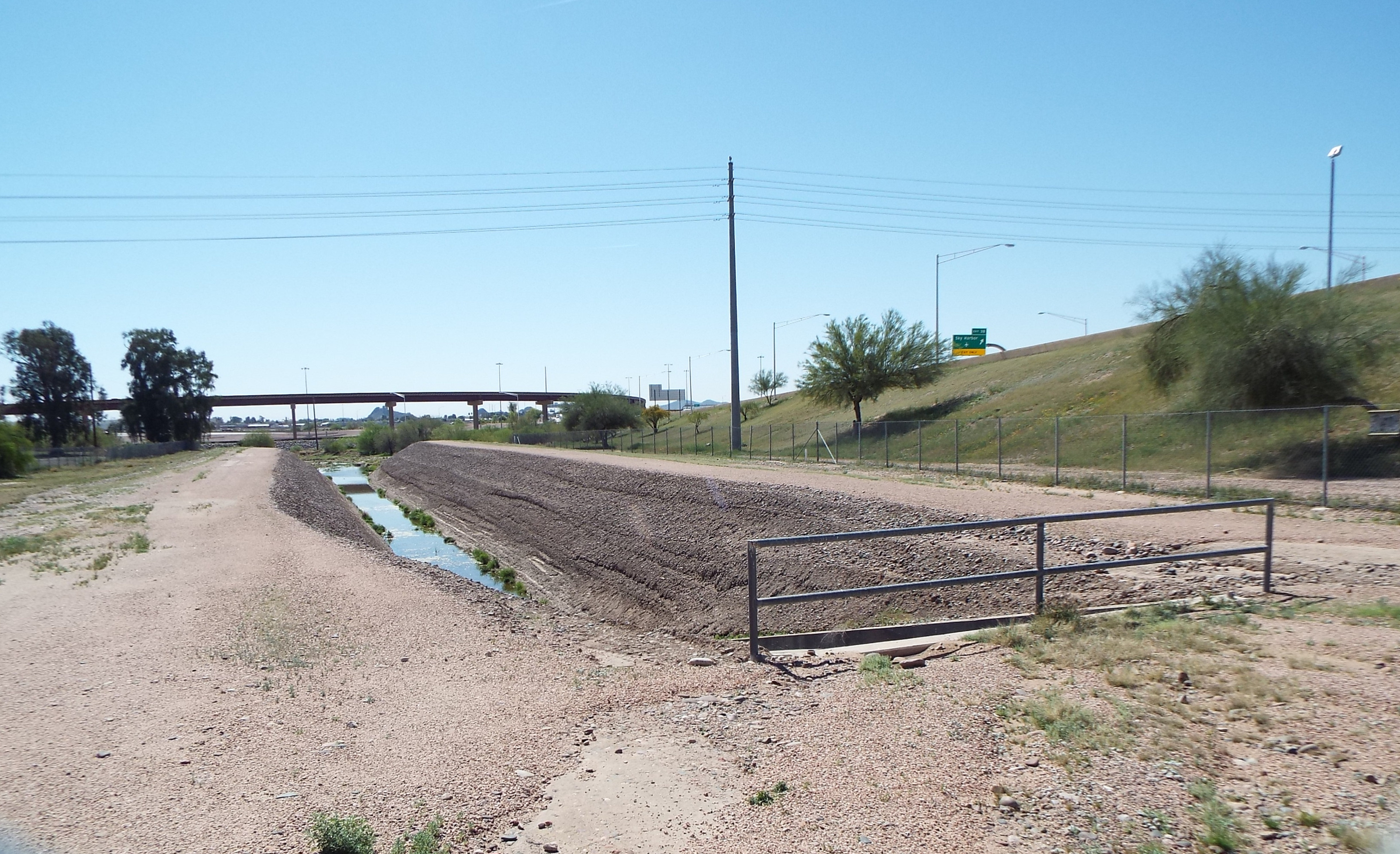
The Old Crosscut Canal was built in 1888 by the pioneers, adjacent to an ancient Hohokam canal which is now filled with soil.

=== The Joint Head Dam and canals ===
When the pioneers of European descent settled in Phoenix, the area was mainly desert. Settlers such as Jack Swilling were inspired by the ancient canals of the Hohokam. The pioneers soon began to dig ditches to carry water from the Salt River which would irrigate their farms. Eventually, canal building companies, such as the Arizona Canal Company, which was formed in December 1882, were organized and built the current canals in the area. The Joint Head Dam was built in 1884, where Jack Swilling dug his ditch, known as the "Swillings Ditch", and where the Salt River are located. The dam served the Grand Canal (built 1878) and eventually the Old Crosscut Canal (built 1888). The abandoned Joint Head Dam has been determined to be eligible for inclusion in the National Register of Historic Places under criterion "A" because of its association with the locally important history of reclamation and therefore, is a Section 4 (f) resource.

Joint Head Dam, the Grand Canal and the Old Crosscut Canal
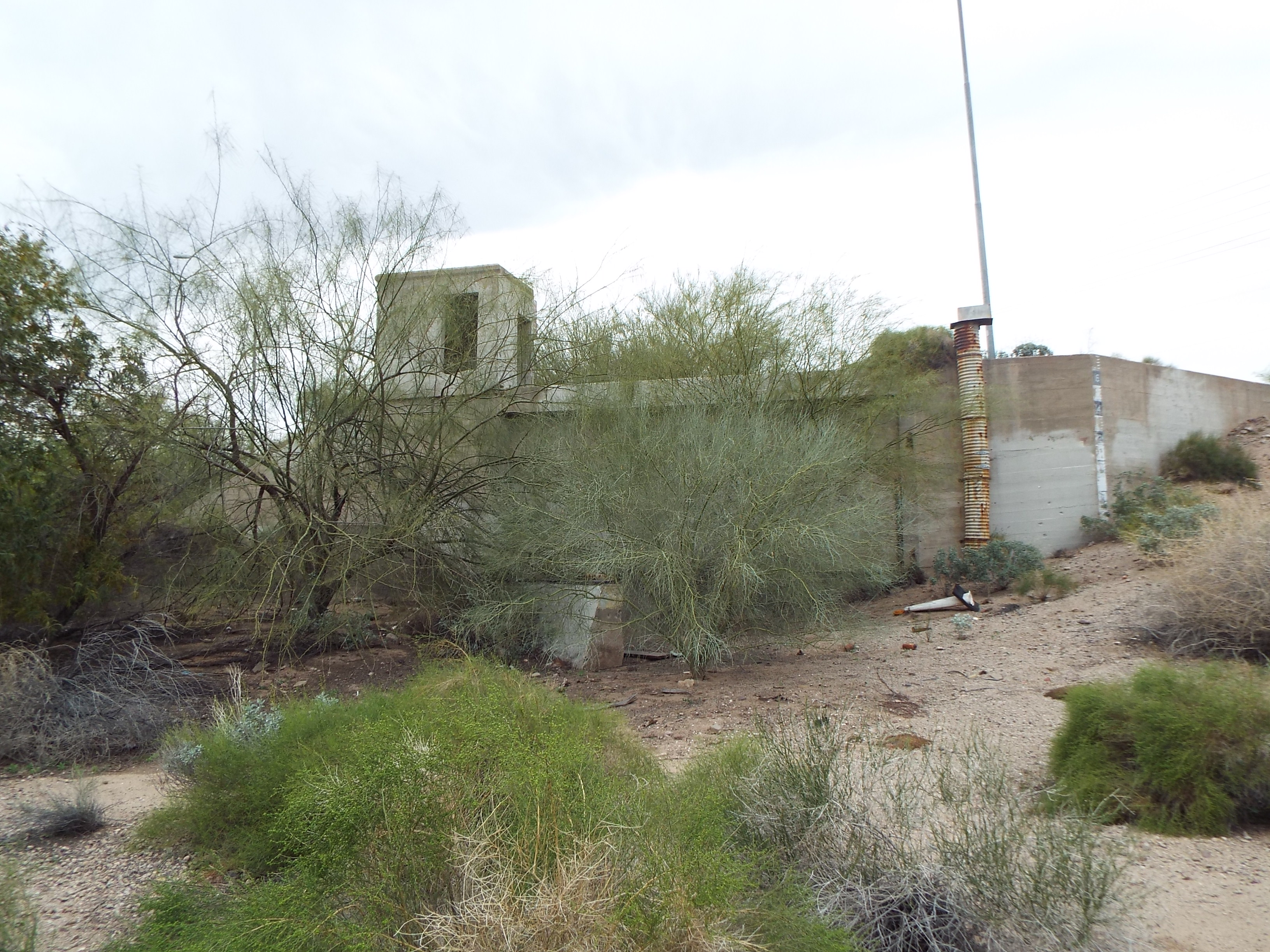
The ruins of the abandoned Joint Head Dam. The joint Head Dam was built in 1884 and repaired in 1913. It is located on a parcel owned by the City of Phoenix, just off 48th Street.

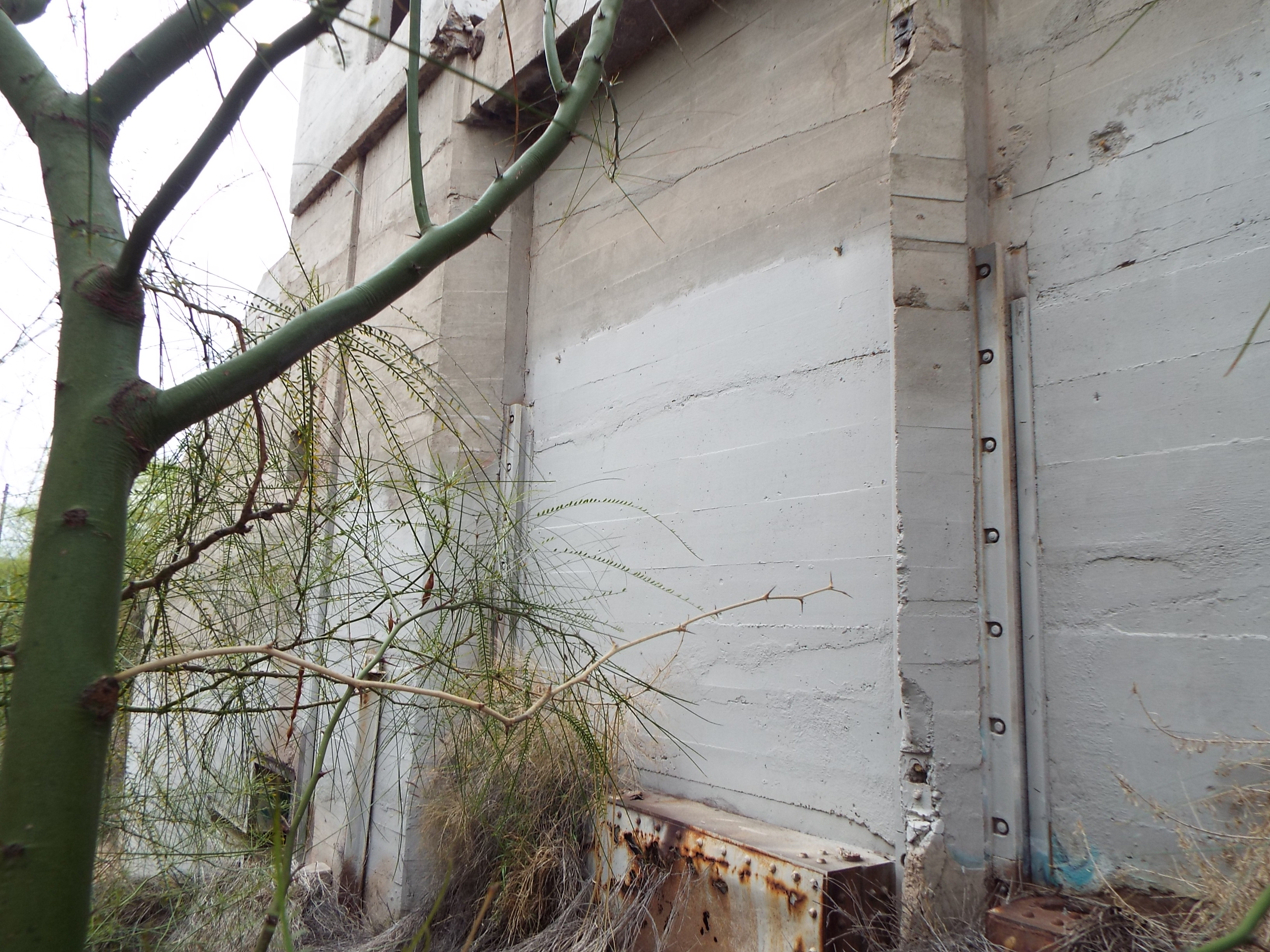
The ruins of the abandoned Joint Head Dam.

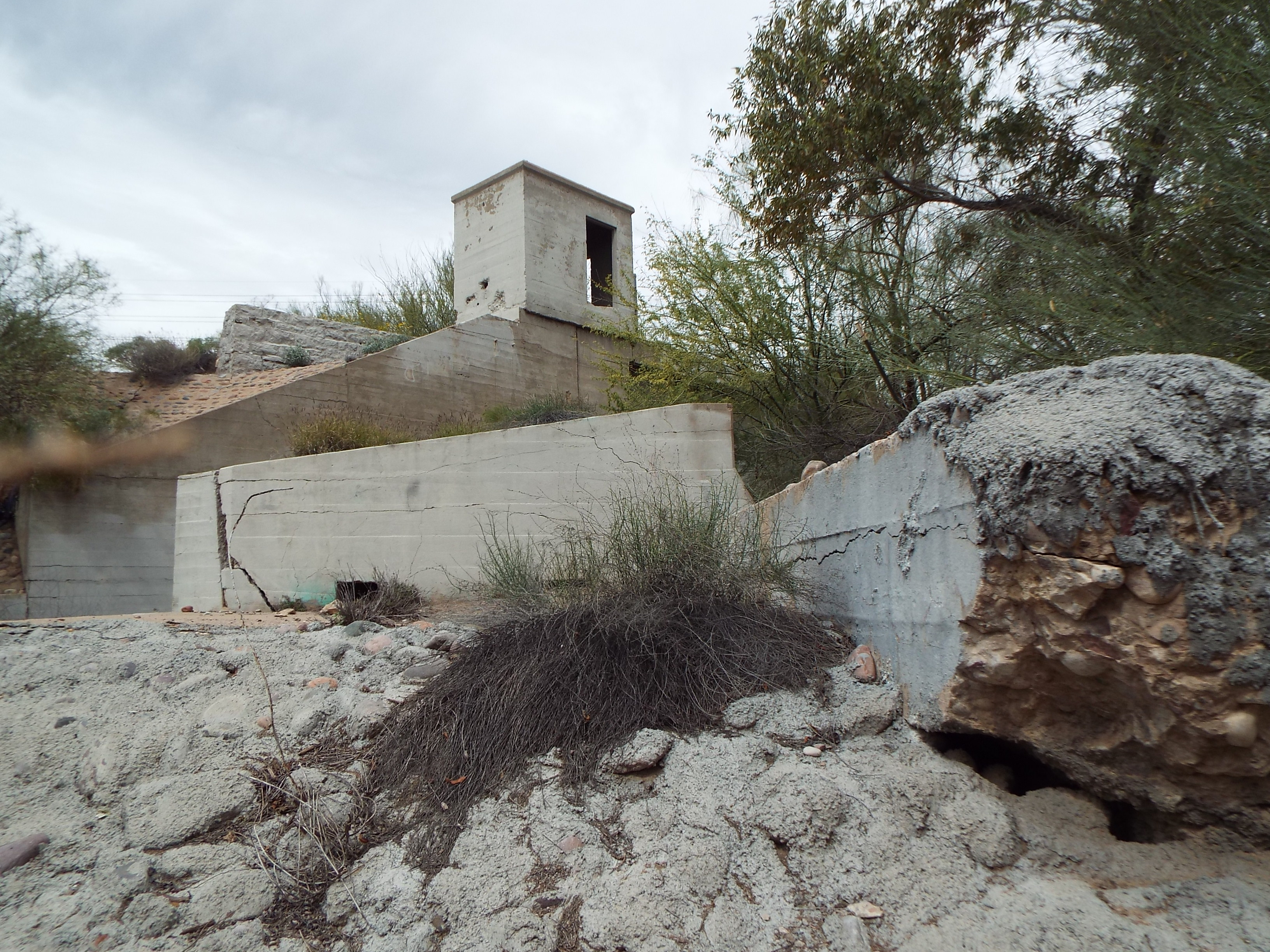
Joint Head Dam ruins.

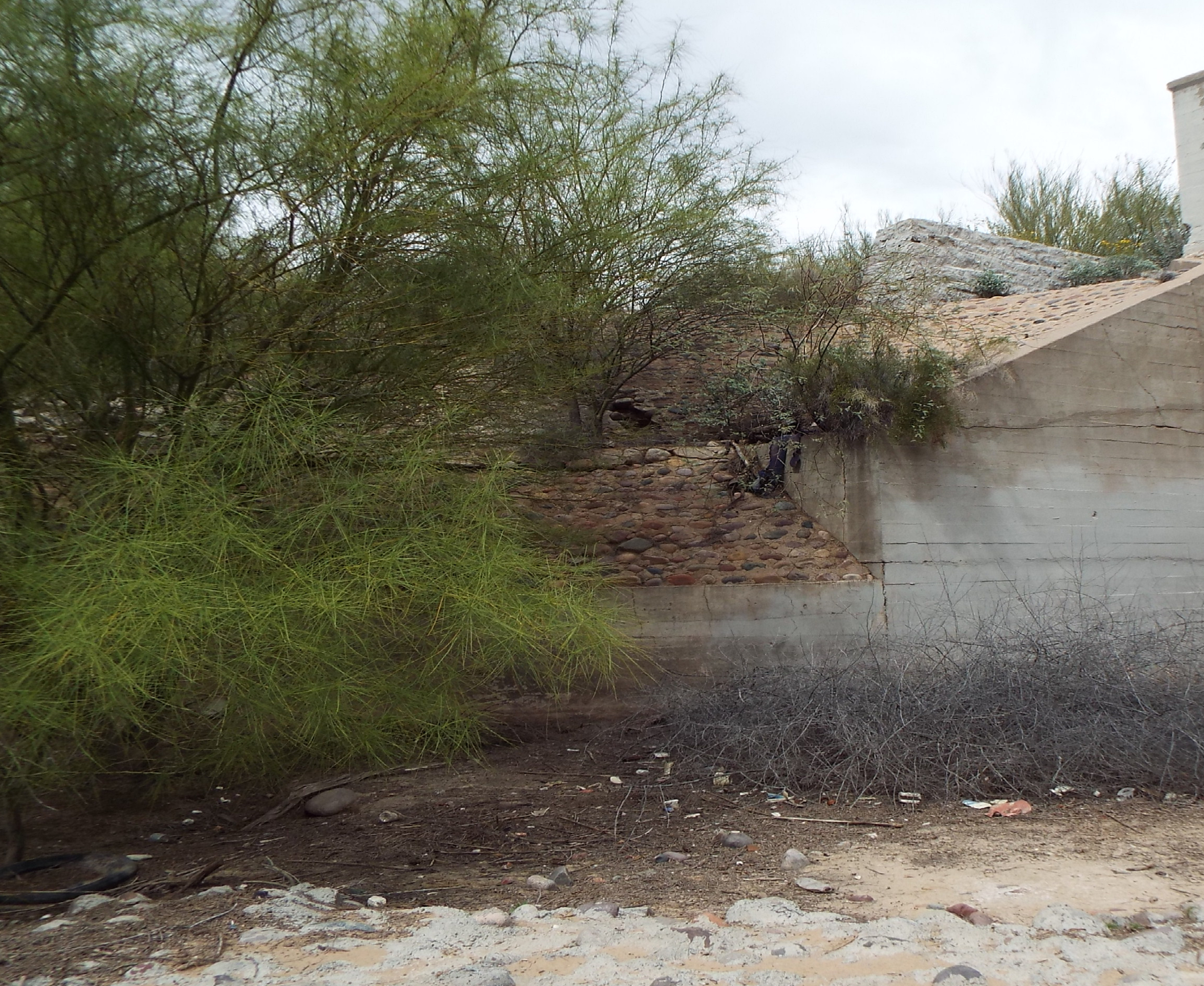
Ruins of the front side of the Joint Head Dam

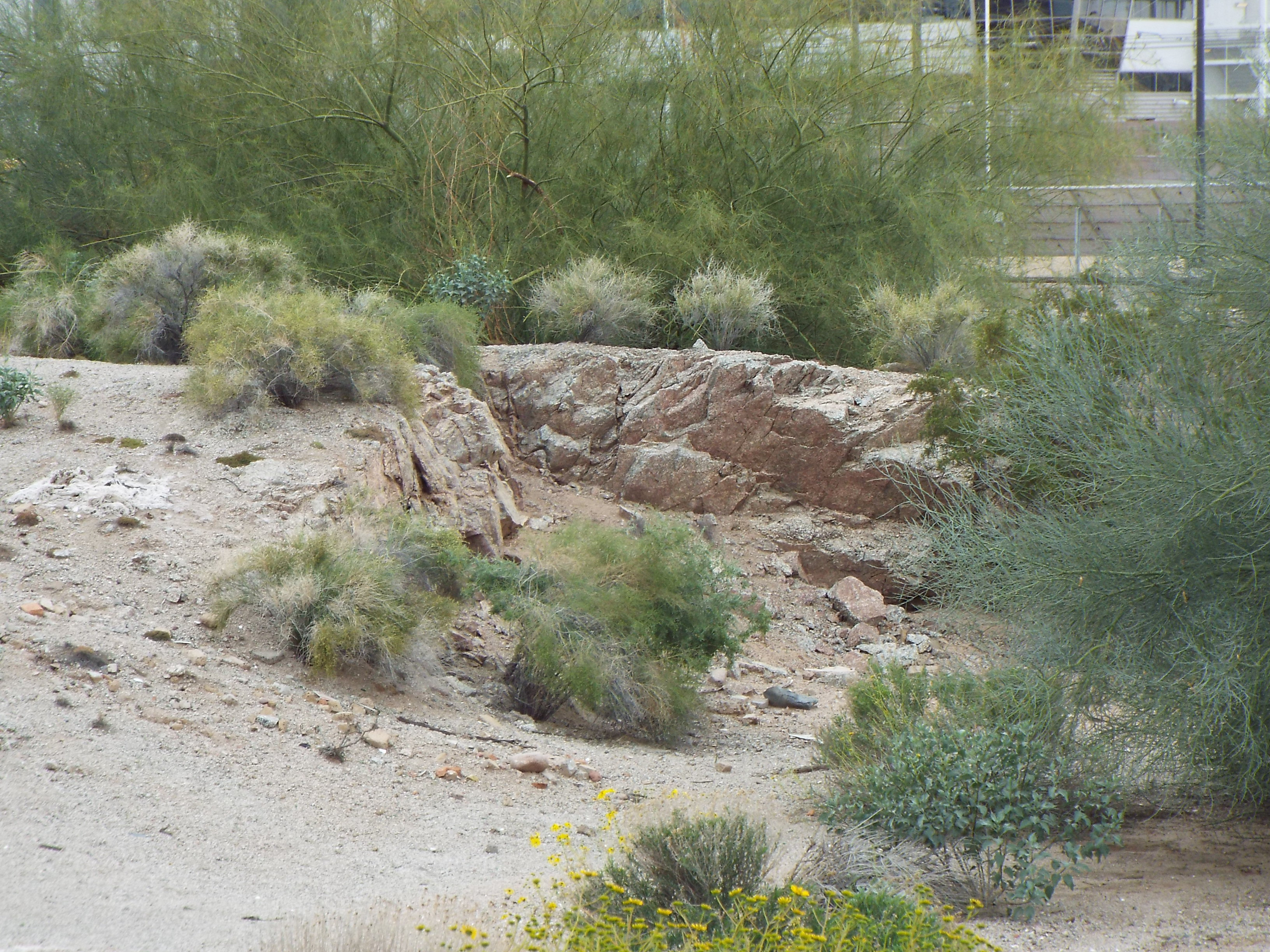
More ruins of the abandoned Joint Head Dam

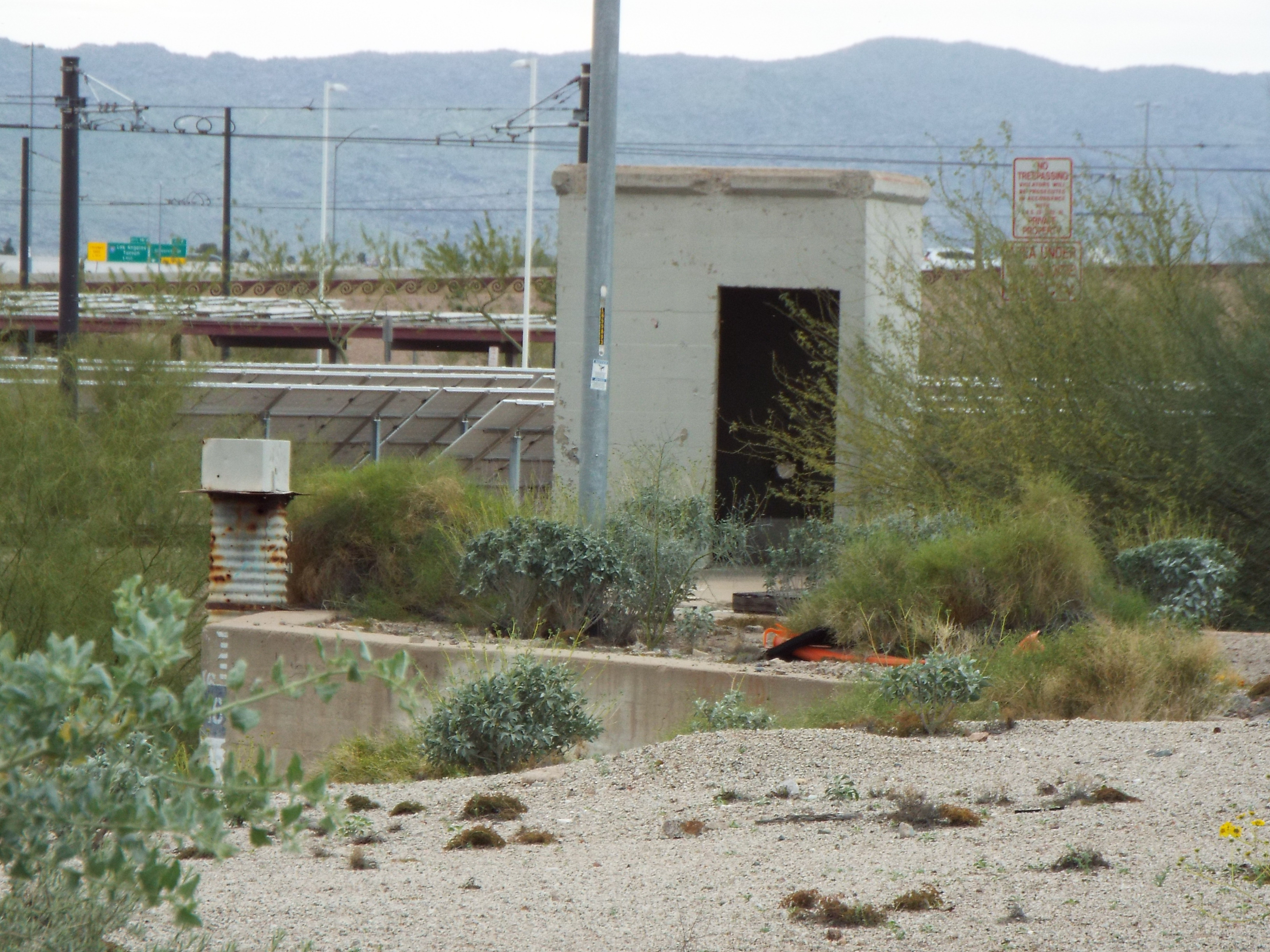
Ruins of the abandoned Joint Head Dam

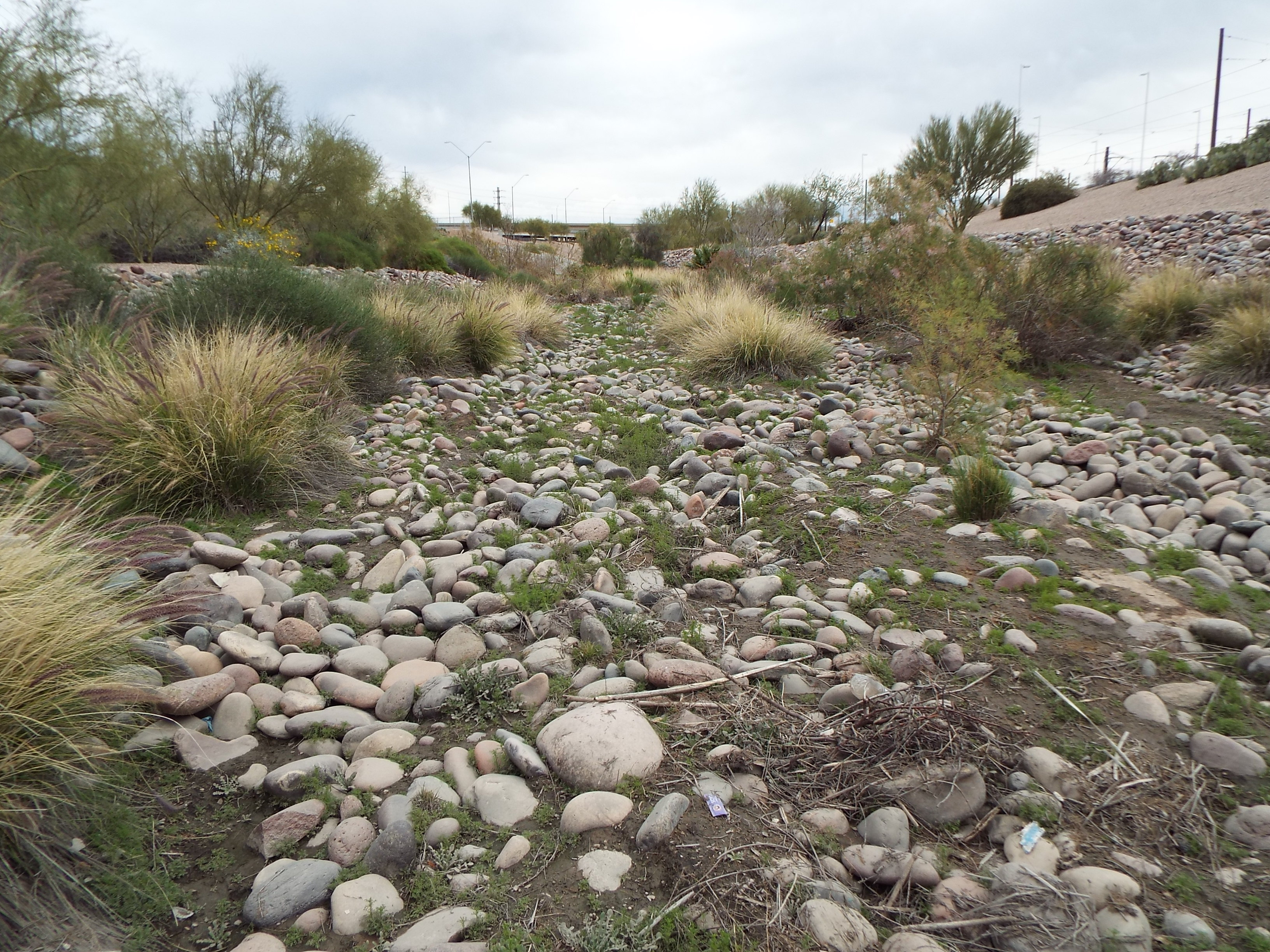
Dried up Salt River bed leading to the Joint Head Dam

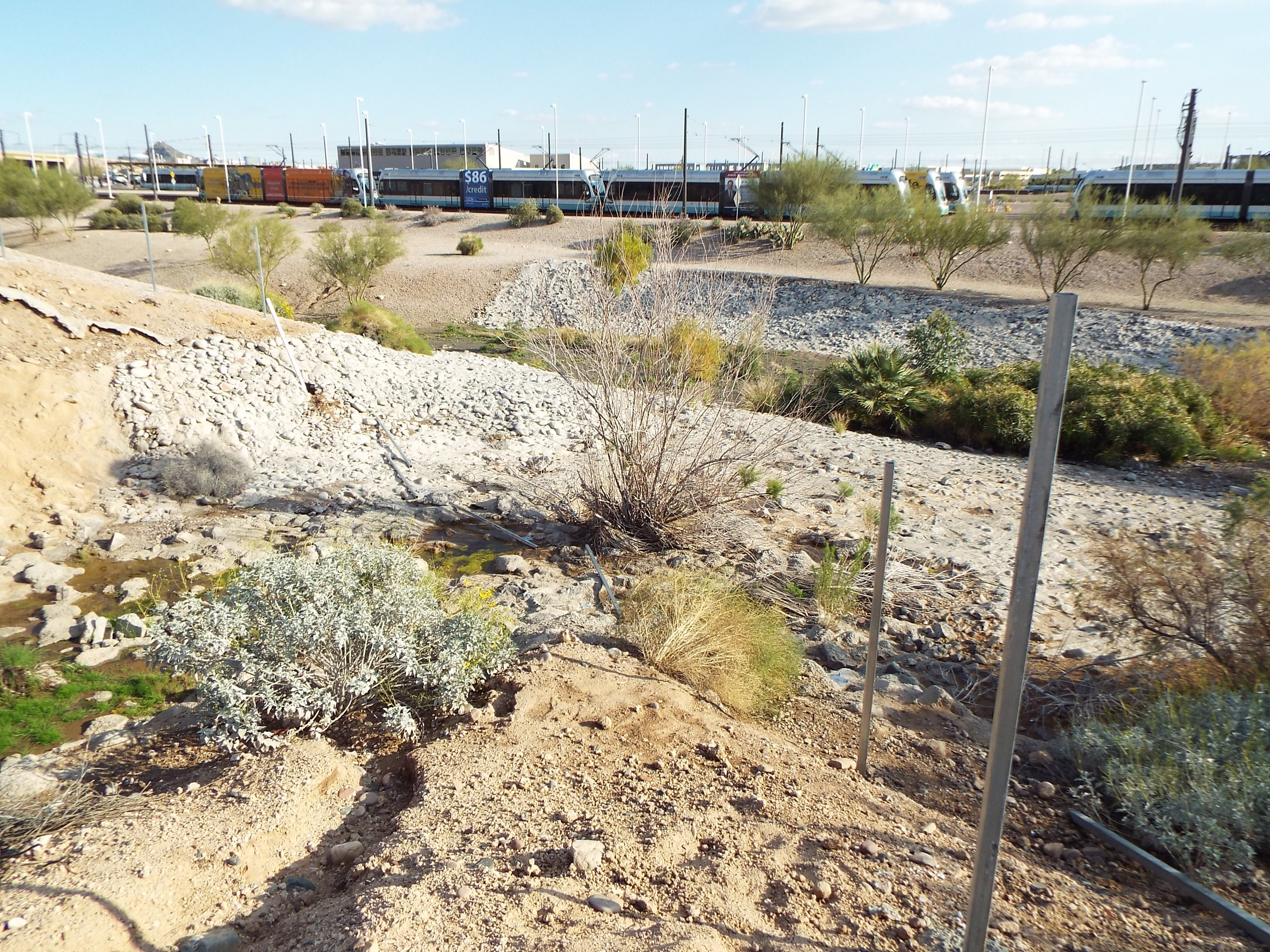
The dried up section of the Salt River where the abandoned remains of the head gate of the Joint Head Dam is located. This is where Jack Swilling first turned a shovel and established the head of "Swillings Ditch".

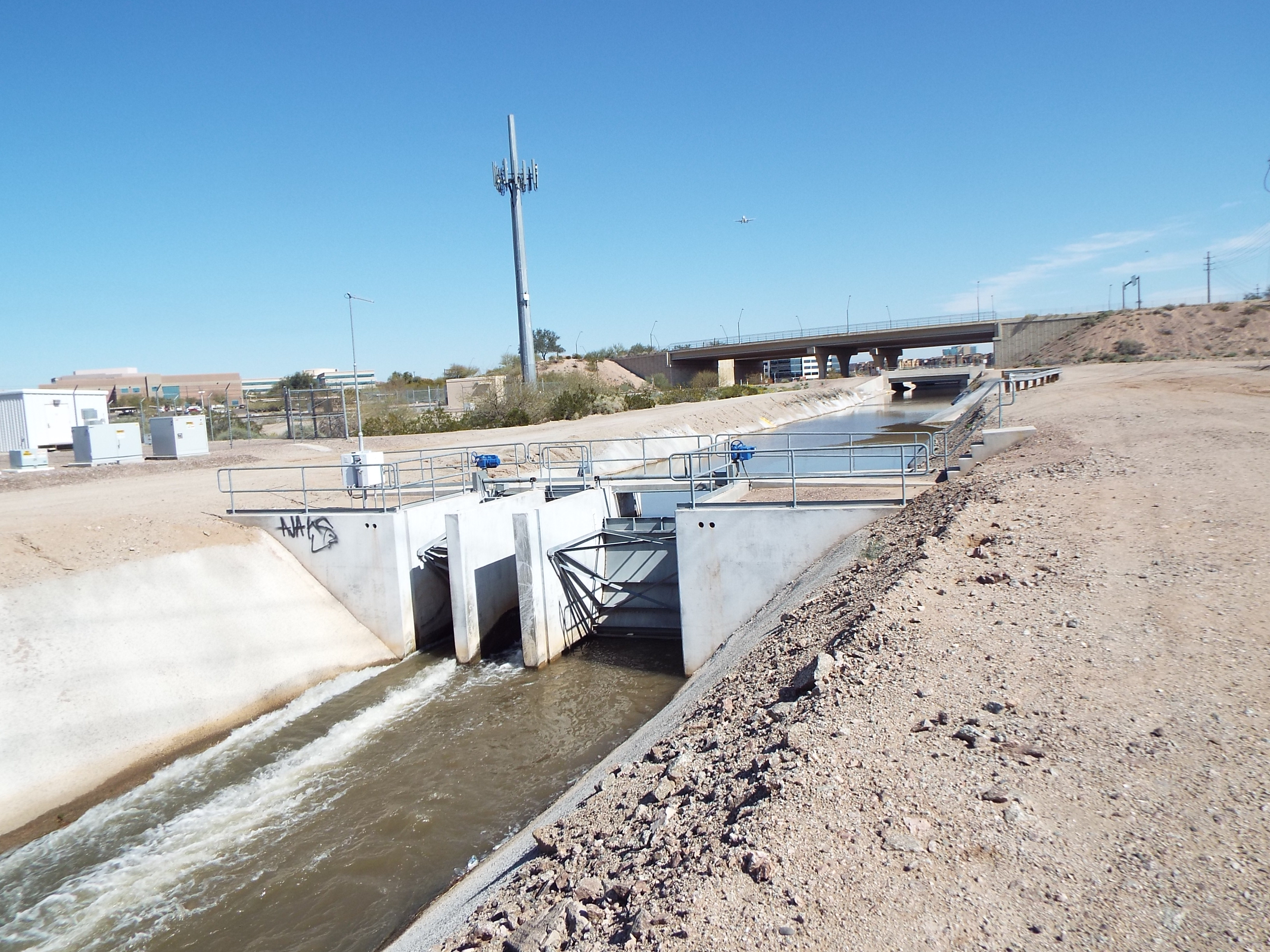
Grand Canal built in 1878 in Phoenix.

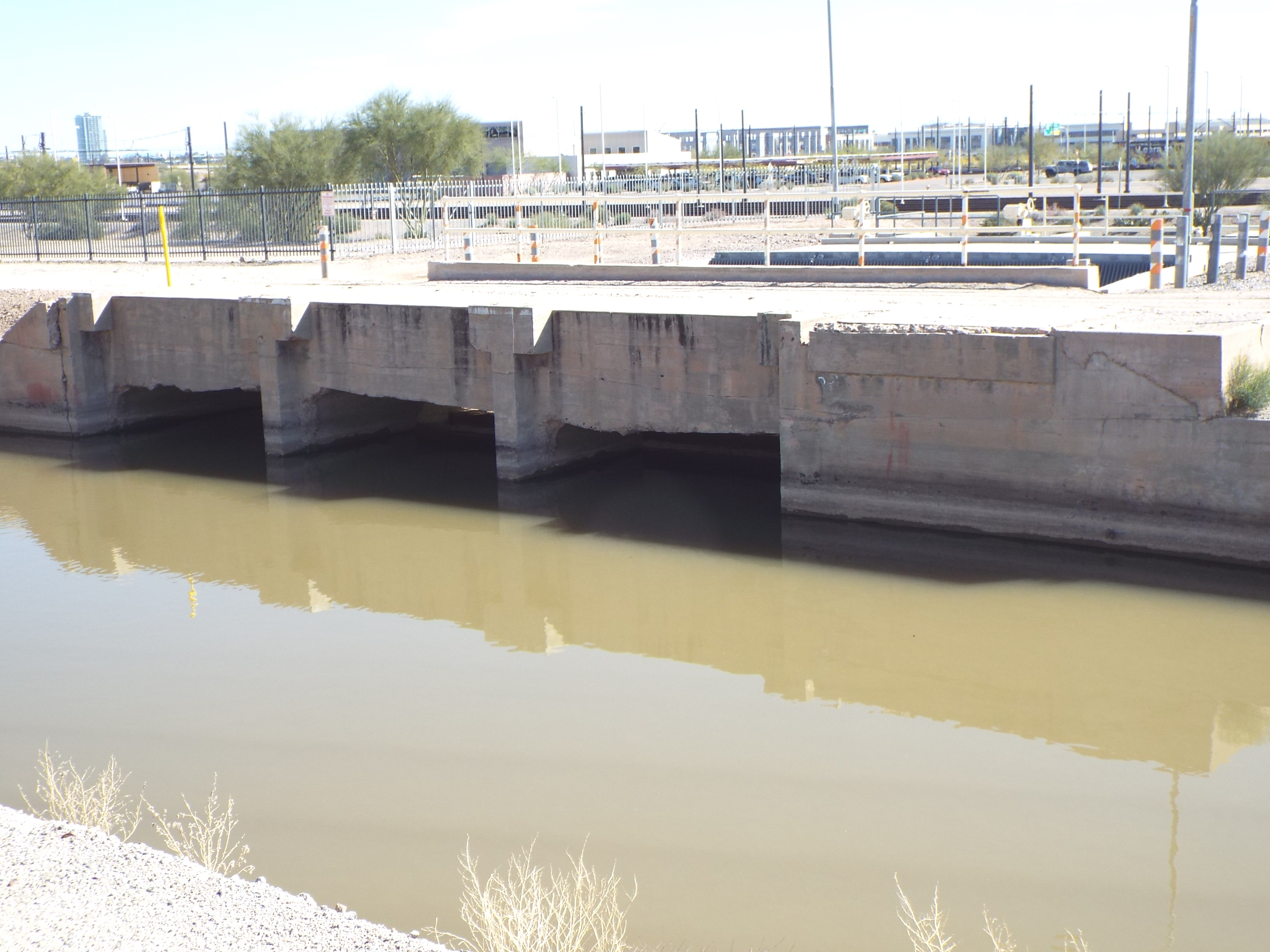
The overflow release on the Grand Canal. Built in 1878, it is located near the end of 48th Street on a parcel owned by the City of Phoenix.

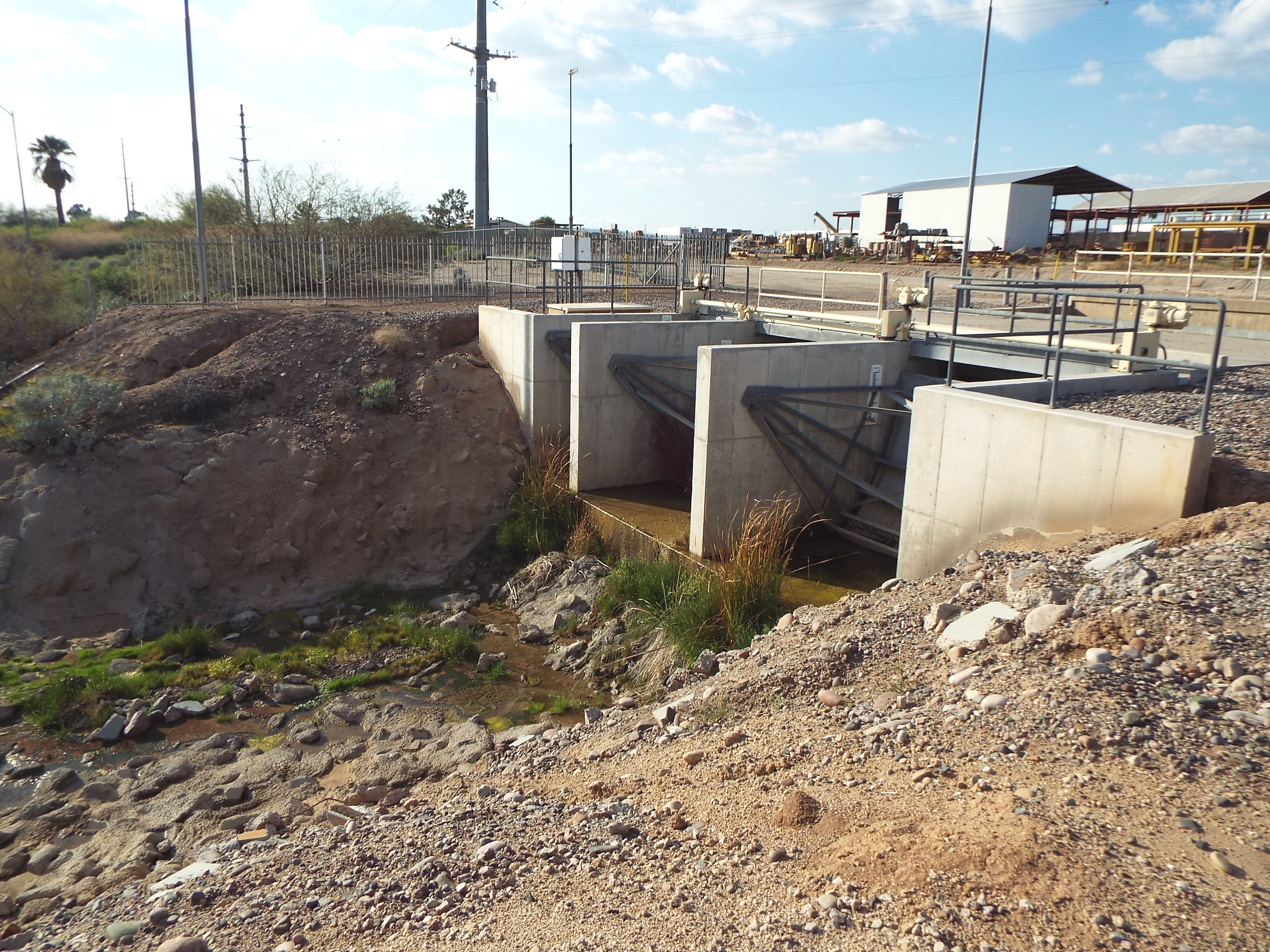
The other side of the overflow release on the Grand Canal

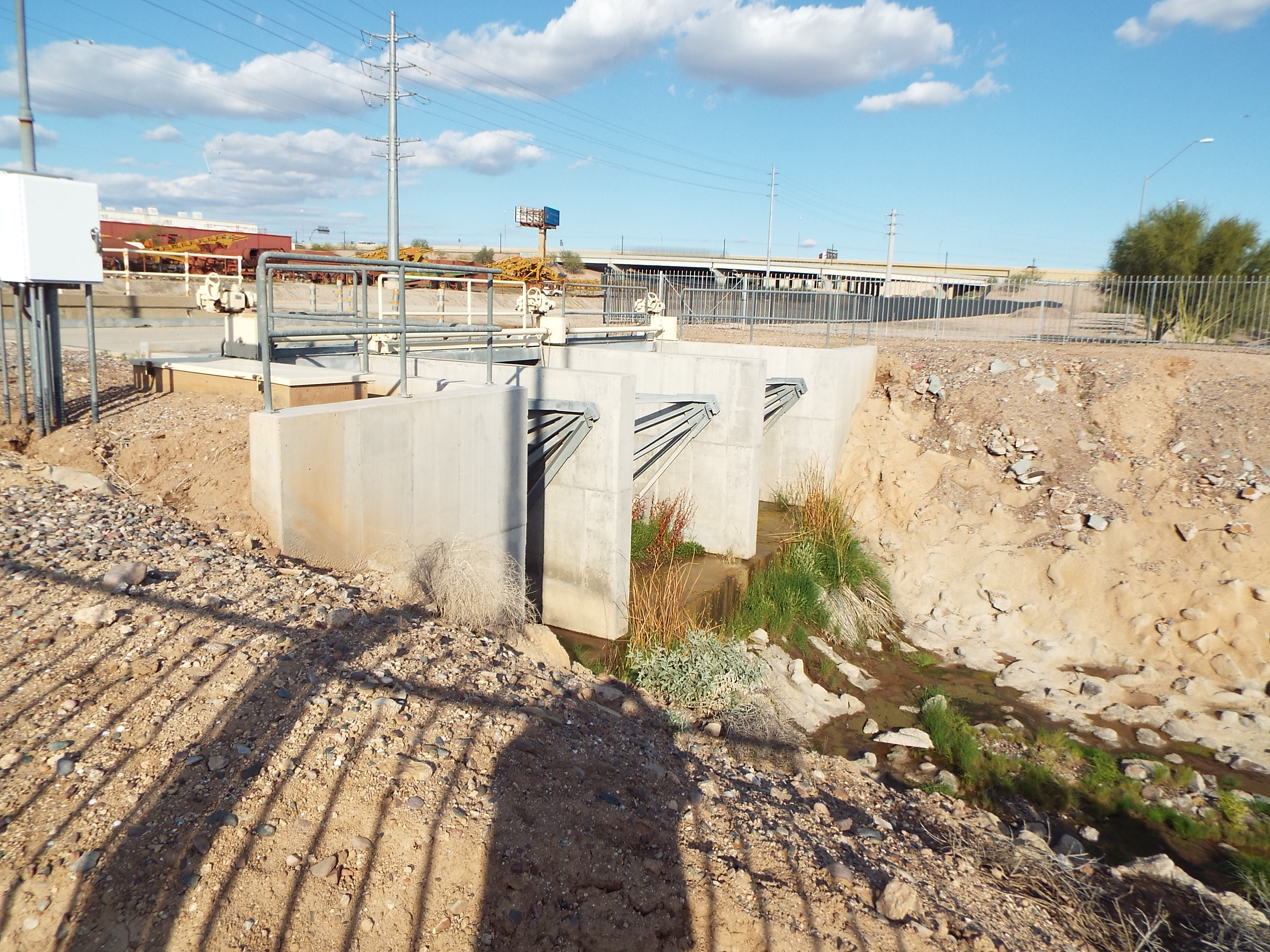
Different view of the overflow release on the Grand Canal

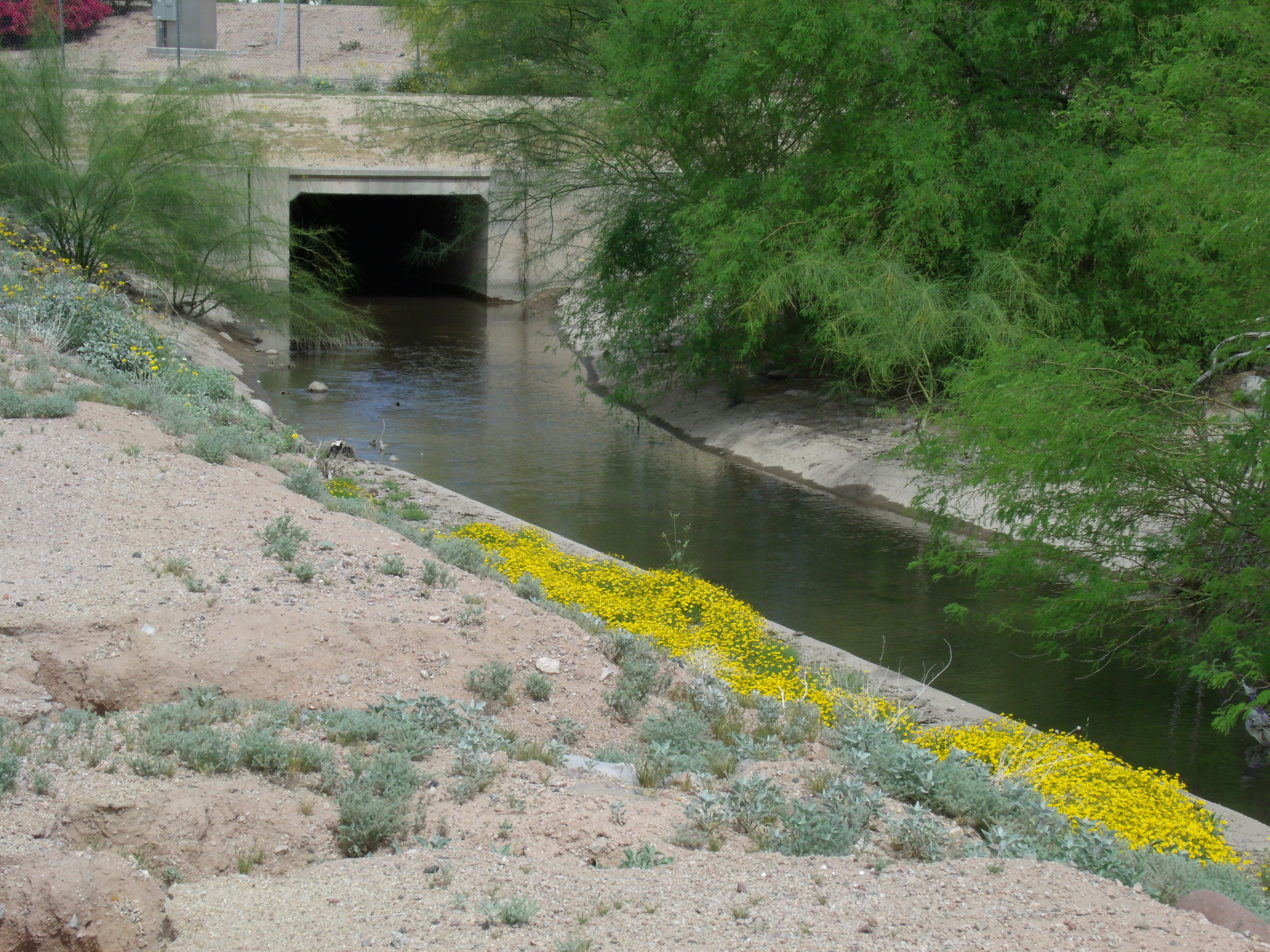
The Old Crosscut Canal built adjacent to the Pueblo Grande Ruin in Phoenix.

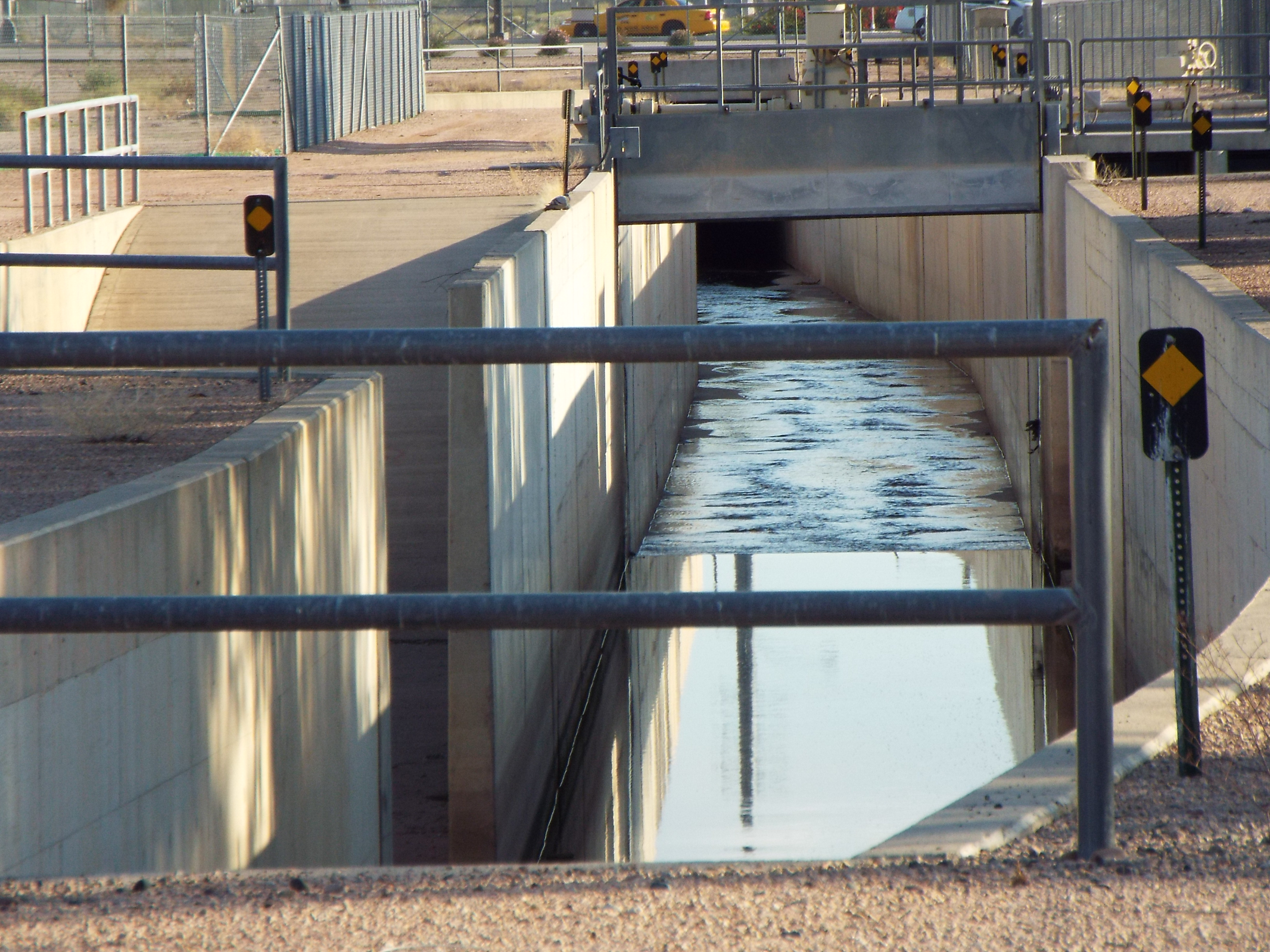
The Old Crosscut Canal was built in 1888.

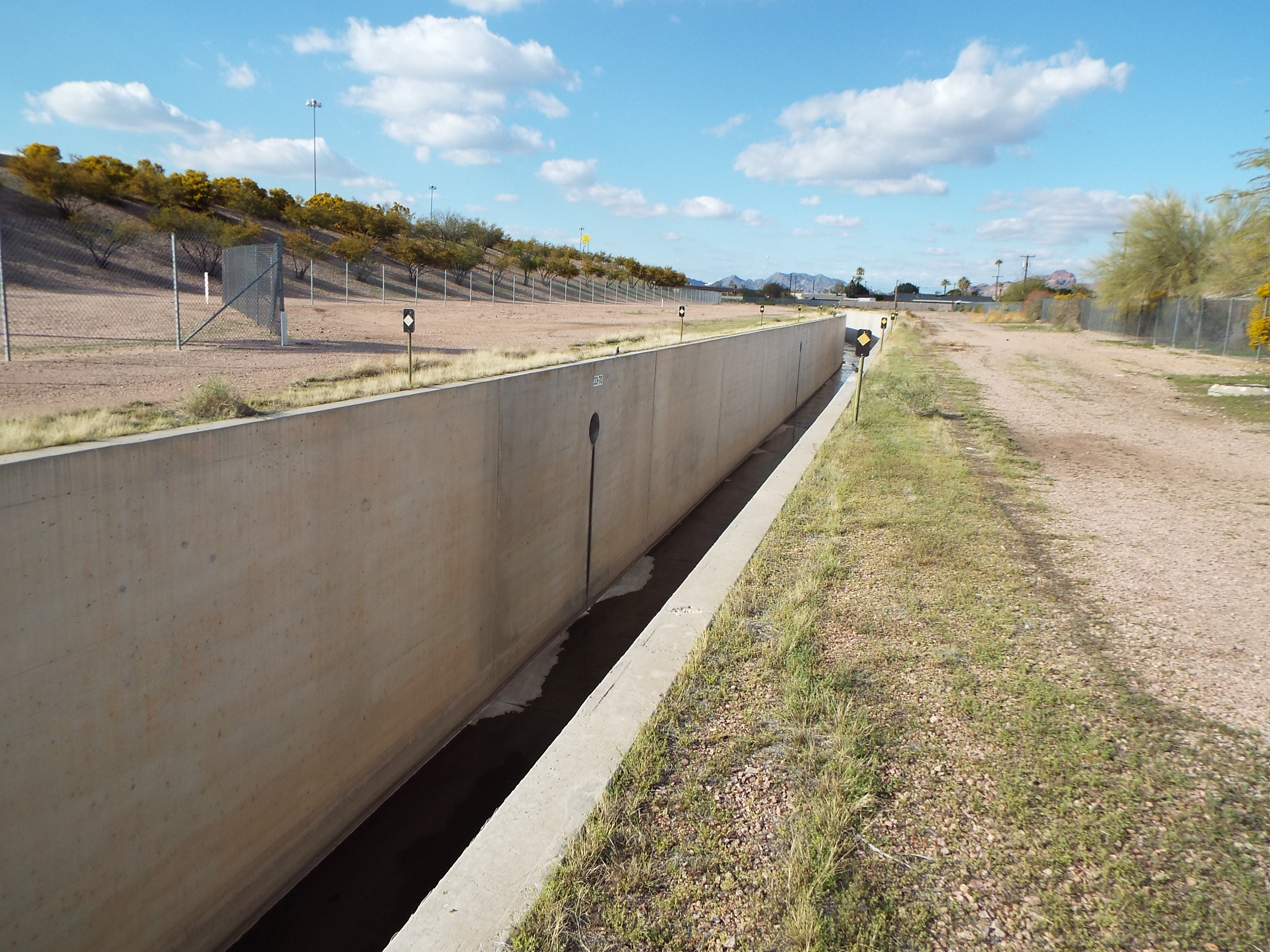
Different view of the 1888 Old Crosscut Canal.

=== Heritage Square ===
Phoenix's Heritage Square is located in what once was block 14 of the original townsite of Phoenix. The square dates back to the Victorian era of the late 1800s. The townsite was listed in the National Register of Historic Places on November 7, 1978, reference: #78000550. The Dr. Roland Lee Rosson House (1895), now a Victorian-period historic house museum, and Baird Machine Shop (1920), which are individually listed in the National Register of Historic Places, are also located in the historic square.

Historic Phoenix Heritage Square
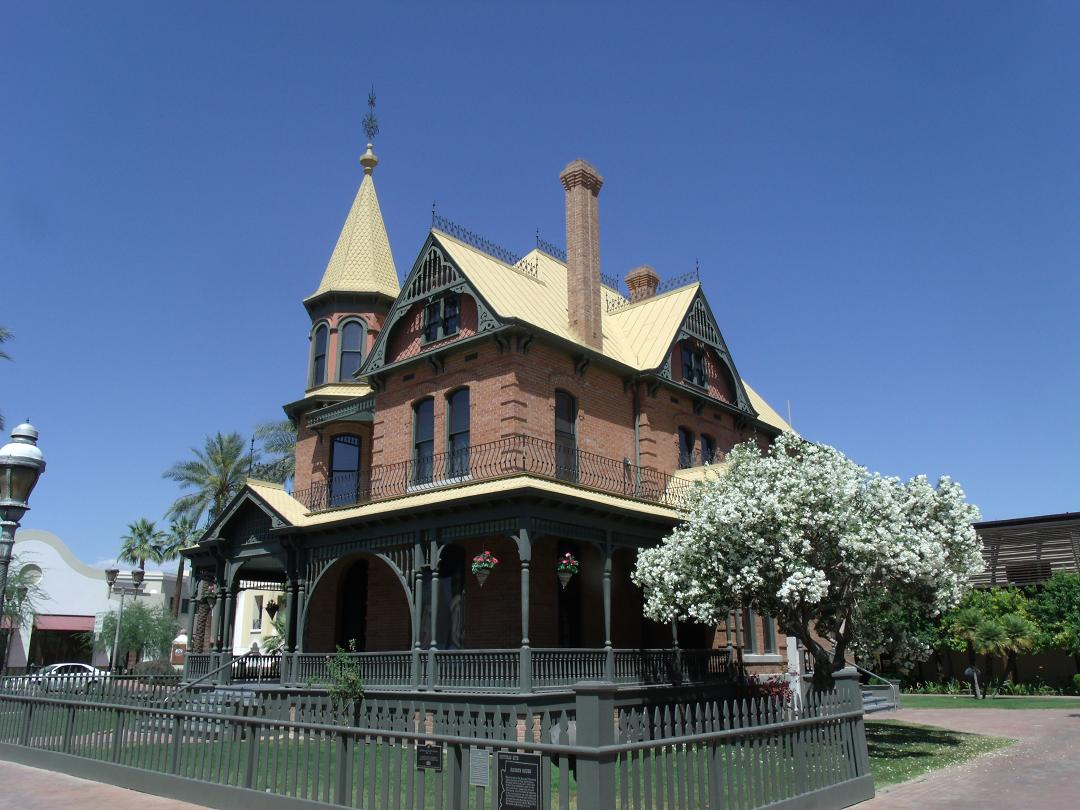
The Dr. Roland Lee Rosson House was built in 1895 and is located in 139 N. 6th Street in Phoenix. It was added to the National Register of Historic Places in 1971. Reference #71000112

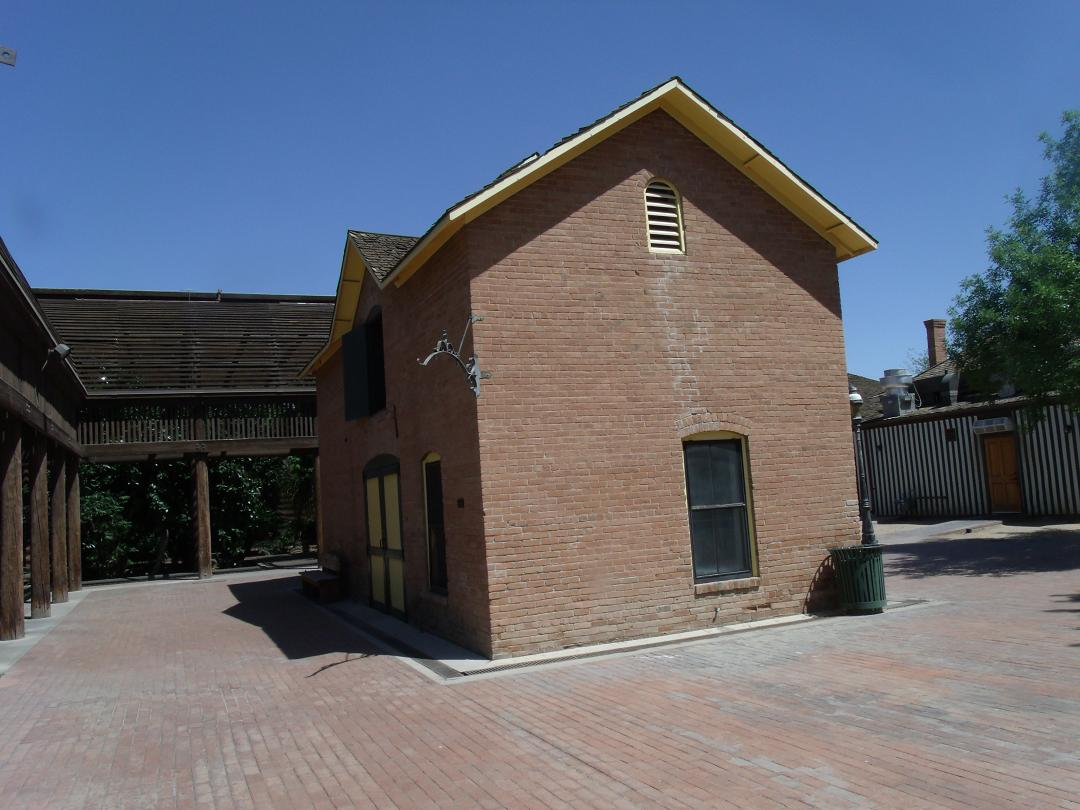
The Rosson Carriage House was built in 1899 (PHPR)

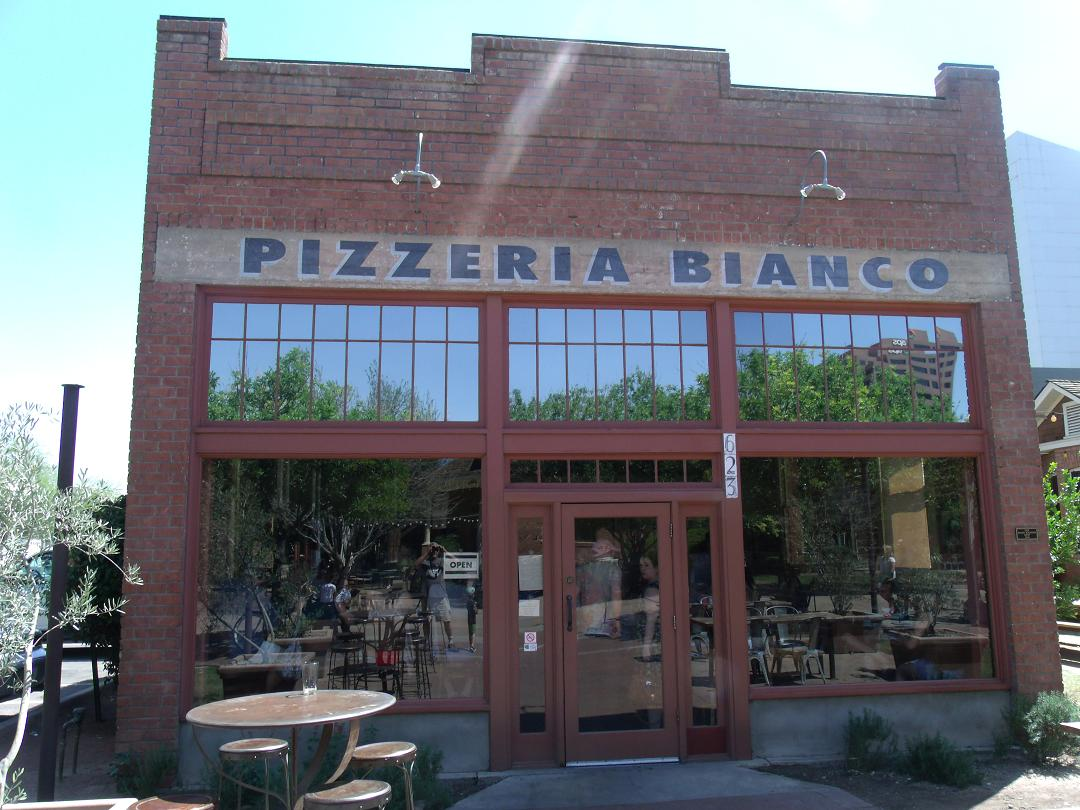
The Baird Machine Shop built in 1920. It is now part of Phoenix's Heritage Square. It was listed in the National Register of Historic Places in 1985. Reference number 85002047.

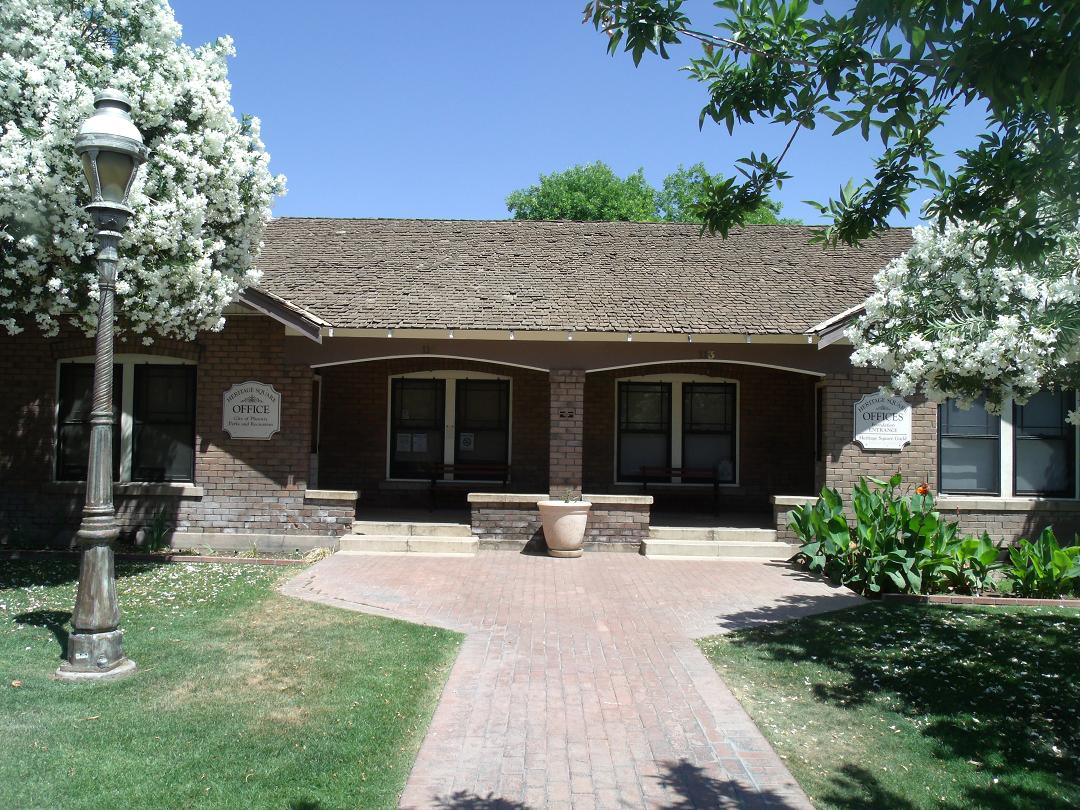
The Hughe's-Stevens Duplex, built in 1923 (PHPR).

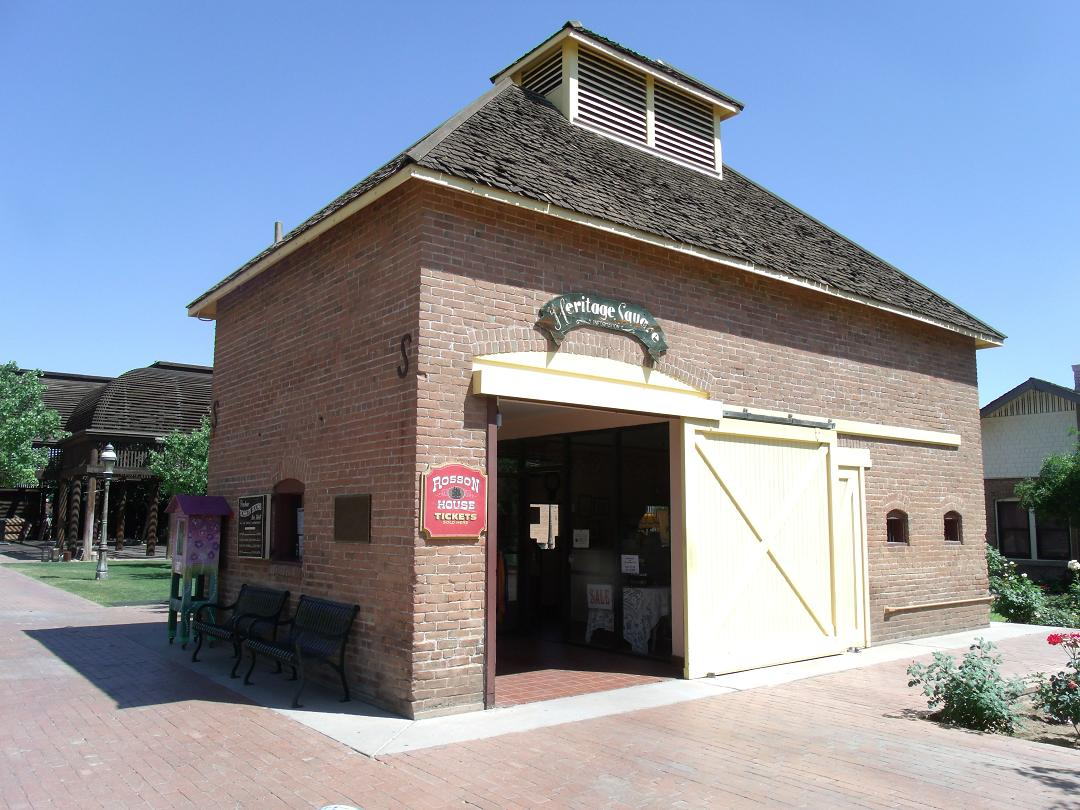
The Forest Burgess Carriage House built in 1881 (PHPR)

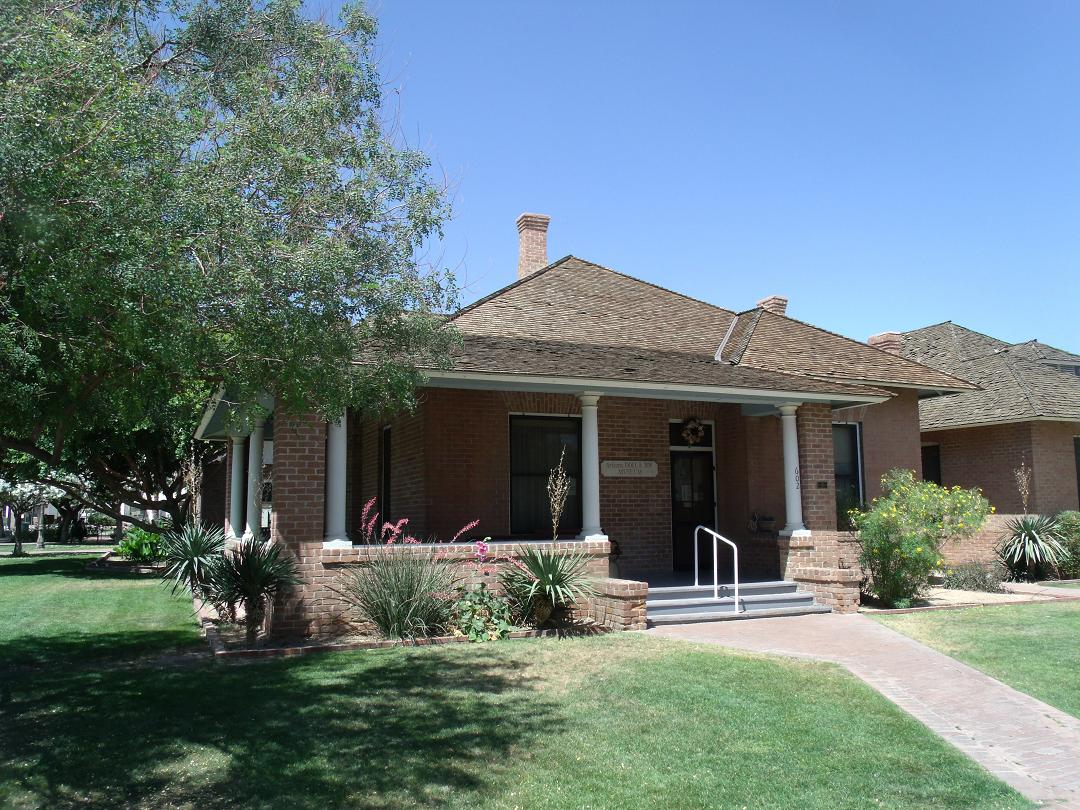
The Stevens House built in 1901 (PHPR)

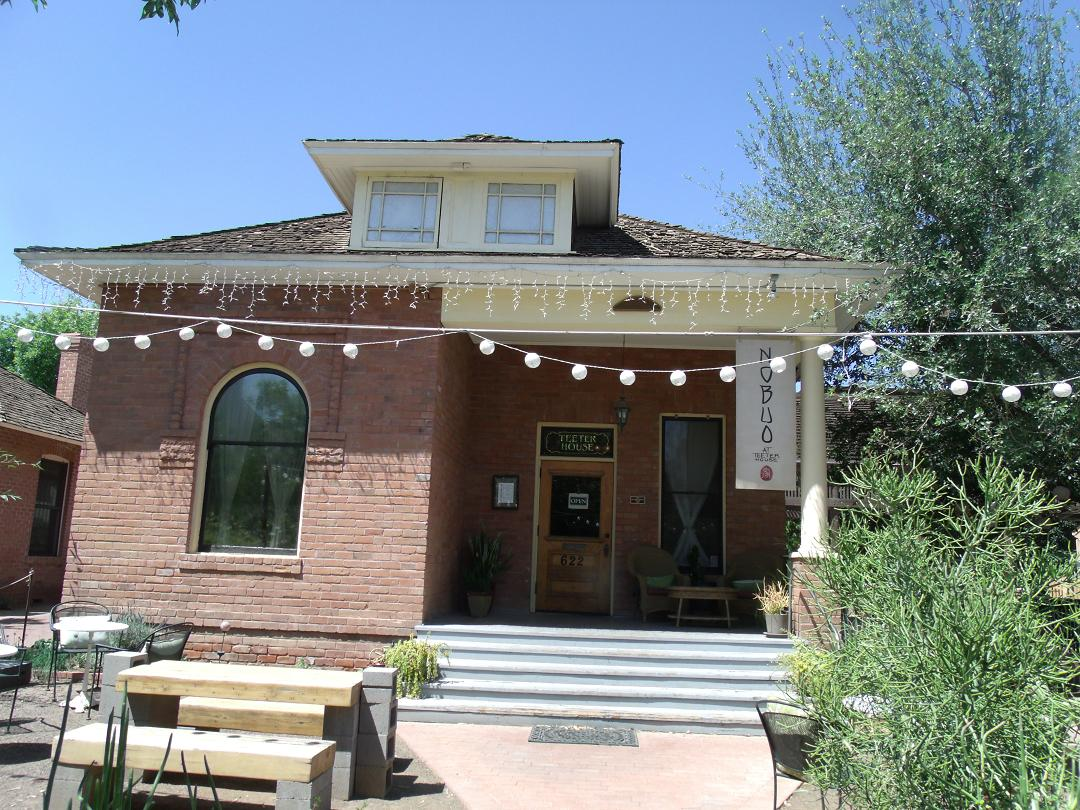
The Bouvier Teeter House built in 1899 (PHPR)

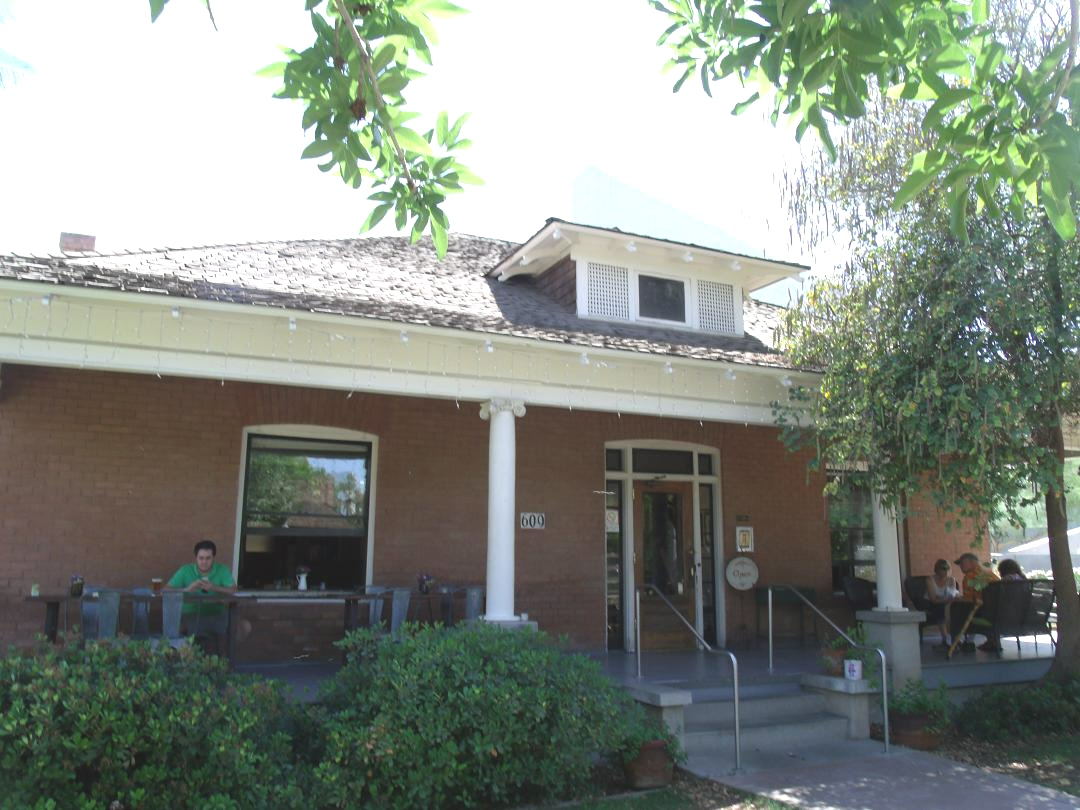
The Thomas House was built in 1909. (PHPR)

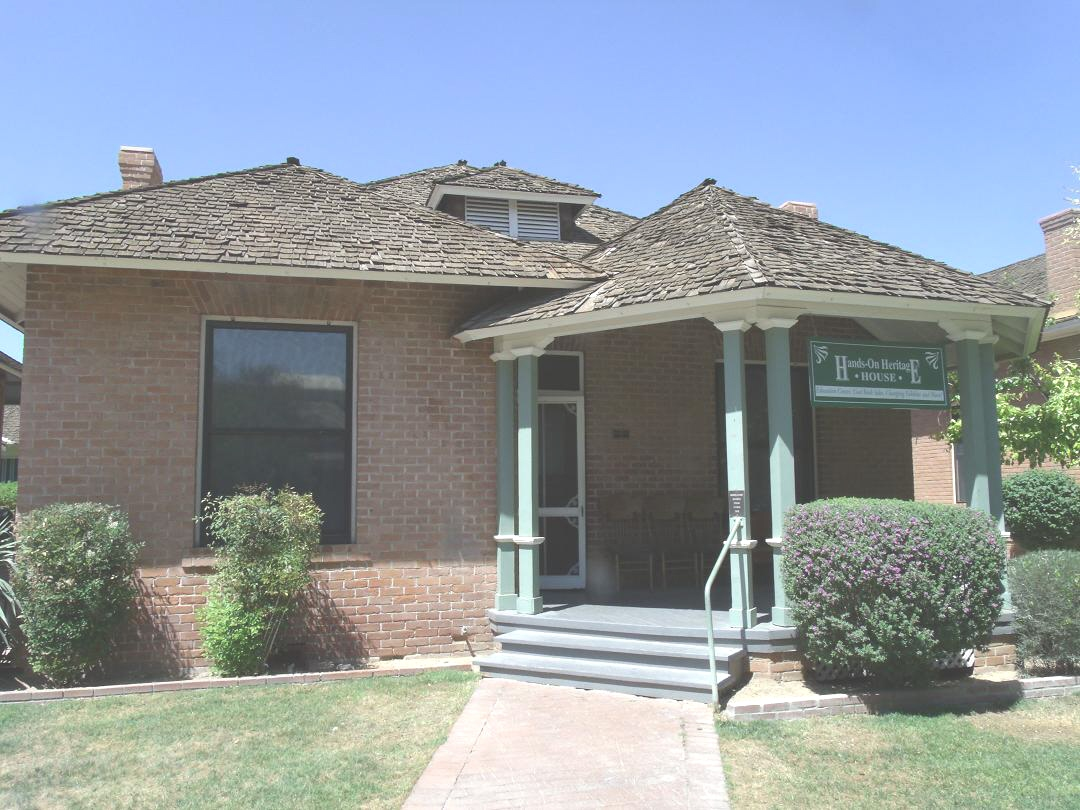
The Stevens-Haugsten House was built in 1901 (PHPR).

=== Buildings and structures ===
This section includes historical buildings which are listed either in the National Register of Historic Places or in the Phoenix Historic Property Register. The oldest of these, which is still standing and in use, is the "Fry's Building" which was built in 1885. The oldest hotel, which was completed in 1893, and is still in use today is the "Windsor Hotel".

Also, included in this section are historic structures such as the "Heard Ranch Grain Silos", listed in the PHPR plus, the Arizona State Fair Grandstand which was built in the early 1900s, the "17th Avenue Underpass" and the "Central Avenue Underpass", both which are eligible to be included in the National Register of Historic Places.

Historic buildings in Phoenix, Arizona
(NRHP = National Register of Historic Places)
(PHPR = Phoenix Historic Property Register)
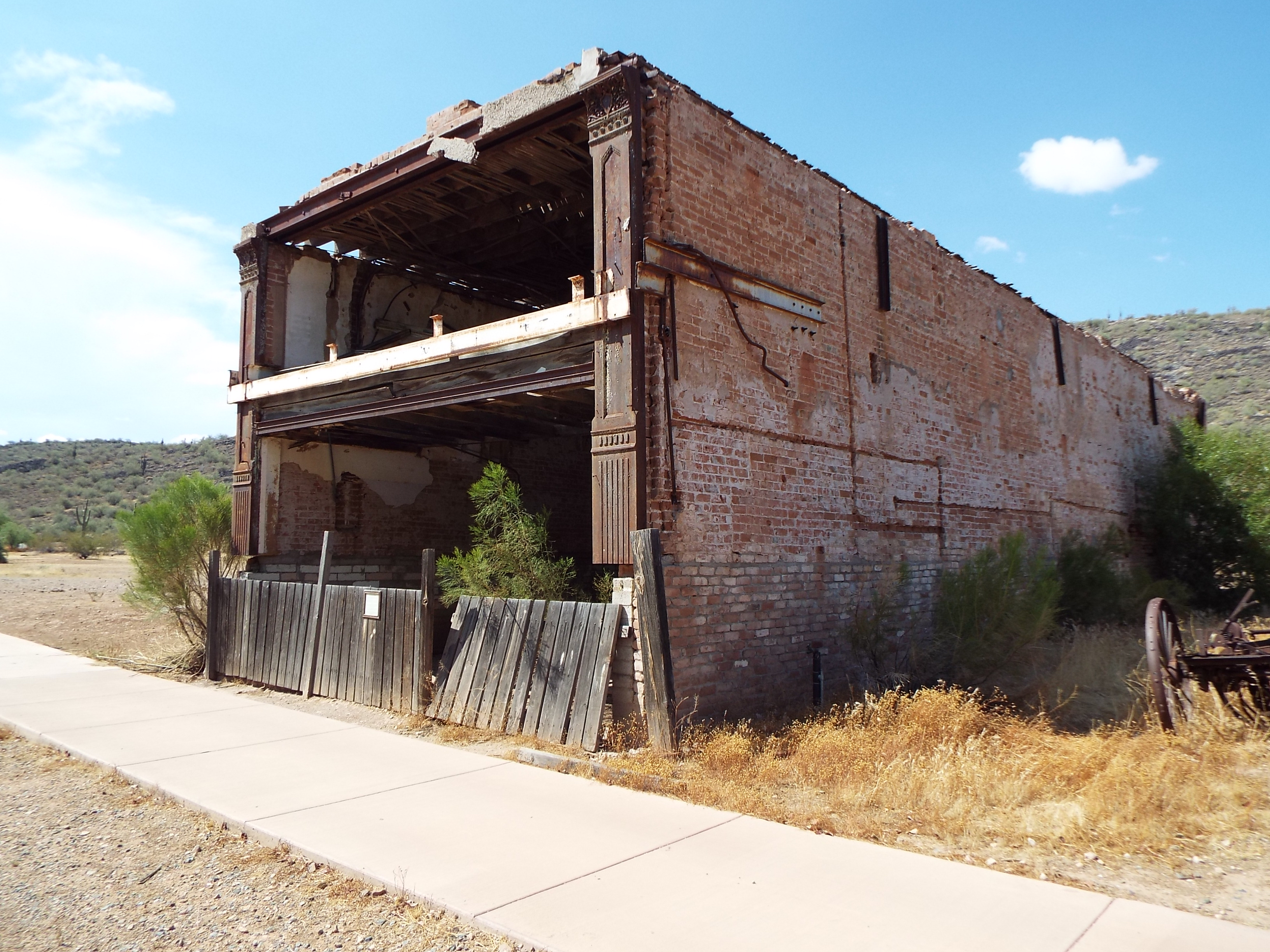
What remains of the Phoenix Bakery building. The structure was built in 1881 and was originally located at 7 West Washington Street. The building was donated to the Pioneer Living History Museum in Phoenix. In 2019, the bakery was moved and reassembled at the Phoenix Zoo.

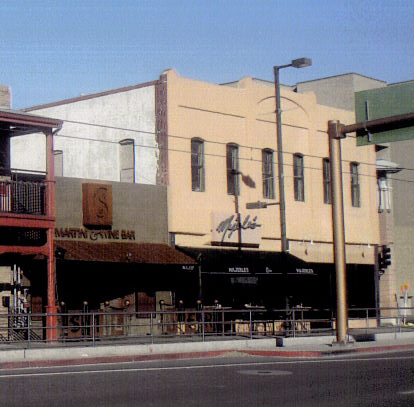
The Fry's Building was built in 1885 and is located in 146 E. Washington St. Listed in the National Register of Historic Places, reference: #85002056.

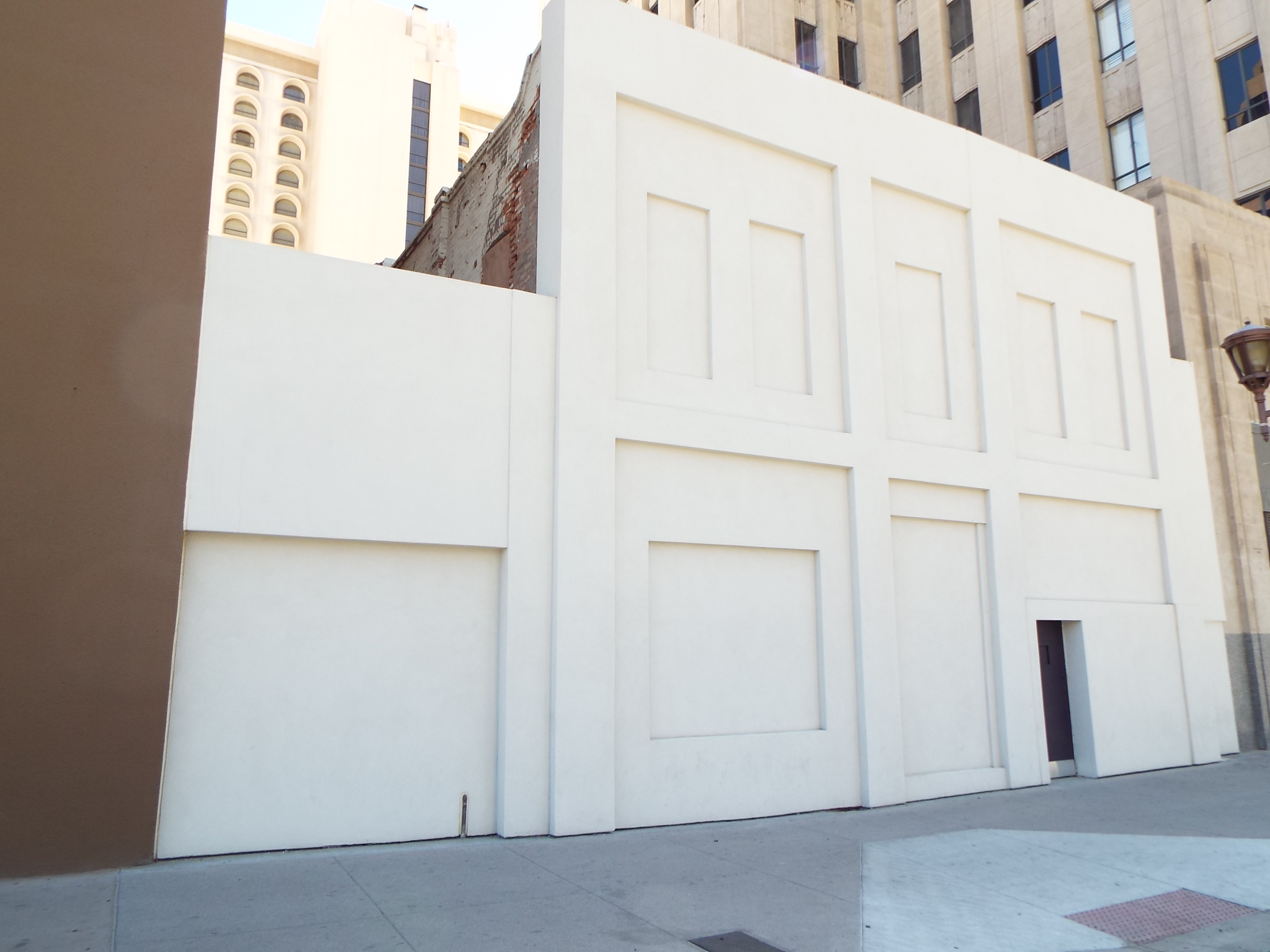
The Steinegger Lodging House. The now abandoned structure was built in 1889 and listed in the National Register of Historic Places, reference: #86001369 on June 19, 1986. It was also known as the Alamo Hotel, St. Francis Hotel and the Golden West Hotel. It is located in 27 E. Monroe St. The Steinegger Lodging House was demolished on July 13, 2020.

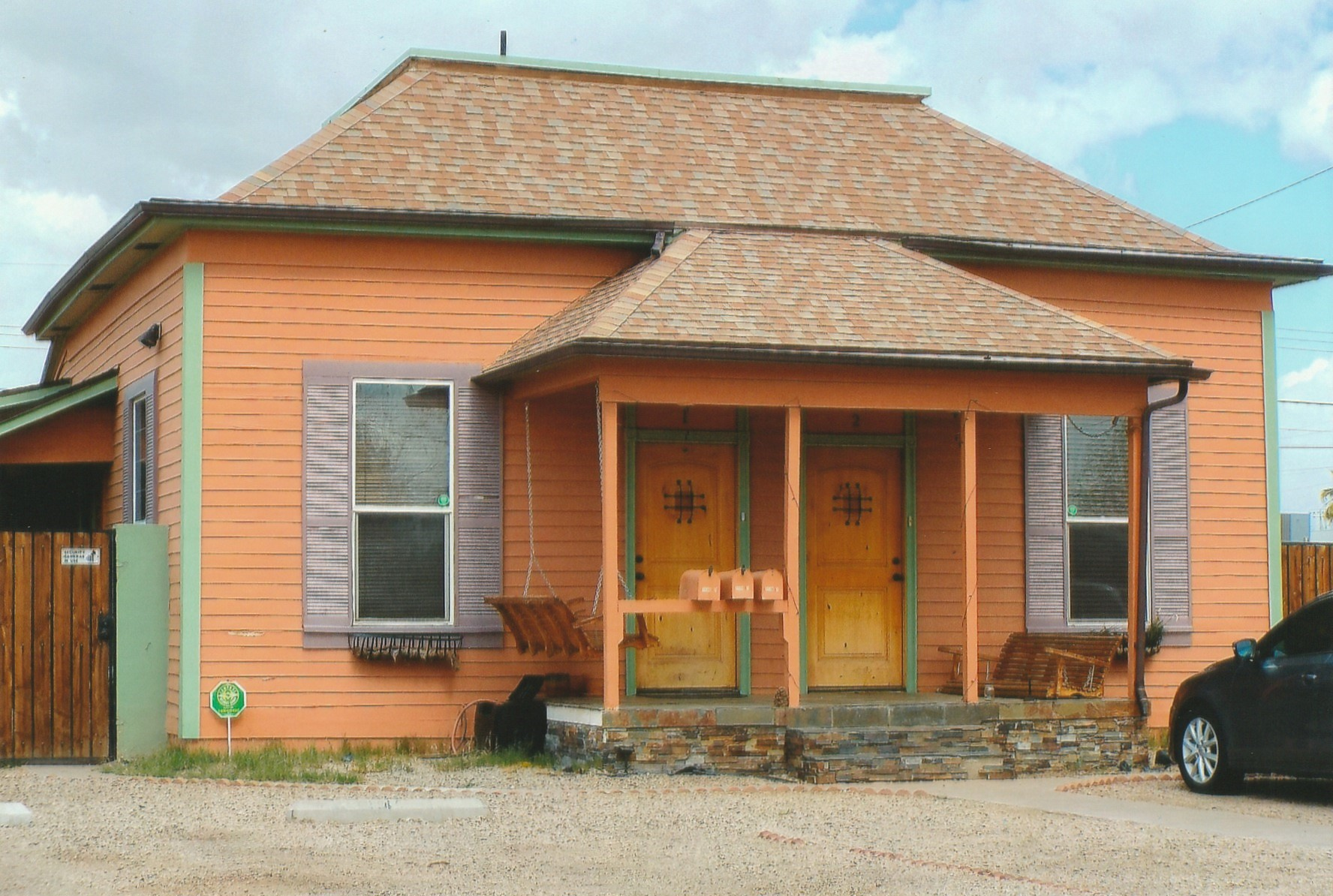
The Phoenix Building and Loan house was built in 1890 and is located at 1138-40 East Taylor Street. It was listed in the National Register of Historic Places on January 12, 1995, reference: #94001534.

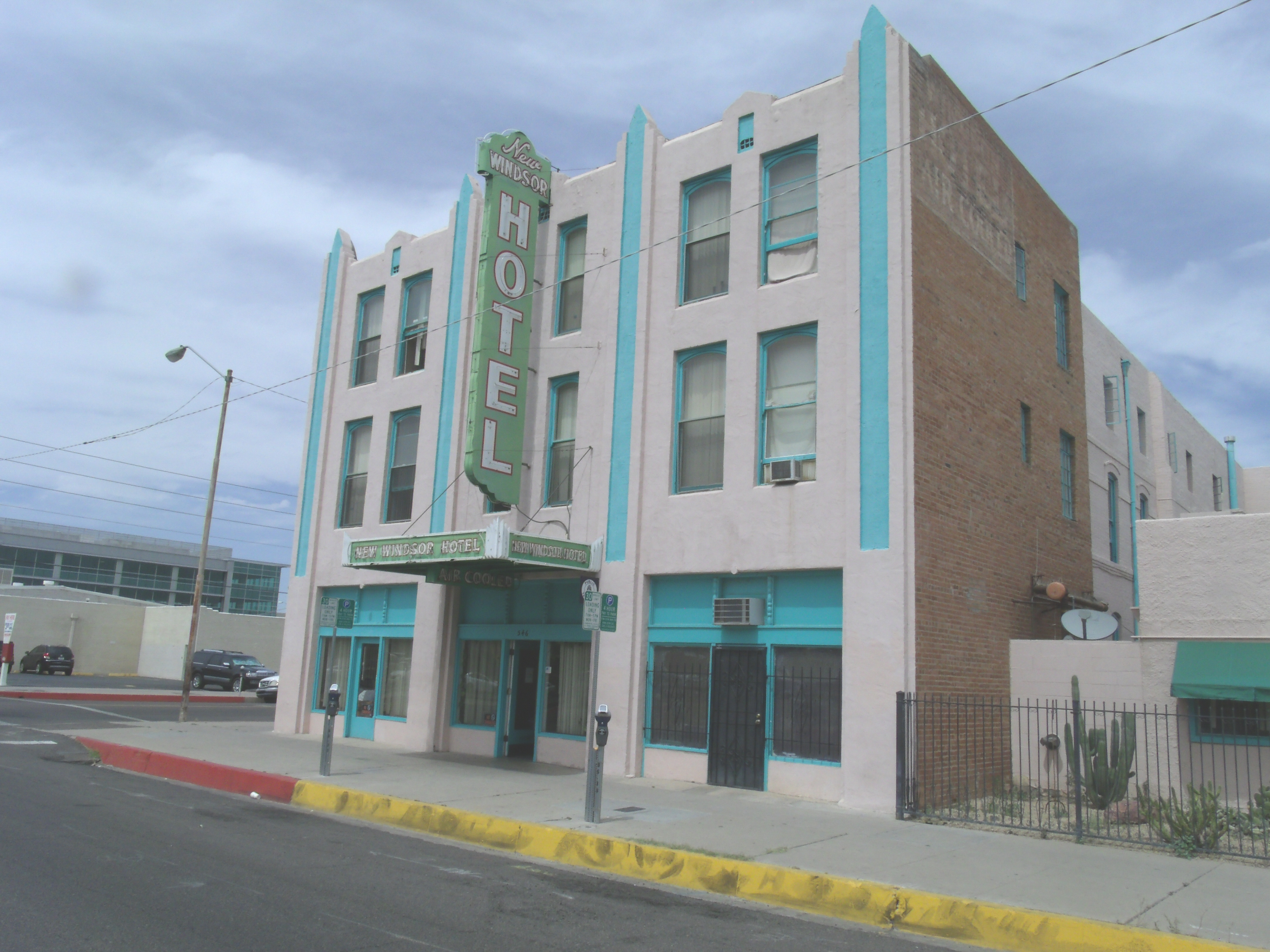
The Windsor Hotel, originally known as the 6th Avenue Hotel, The hotel was completed in 1893 and is located at 546 W. Adams St. The hotel is listed in the National Register of Historic Places, reference: #85002041.

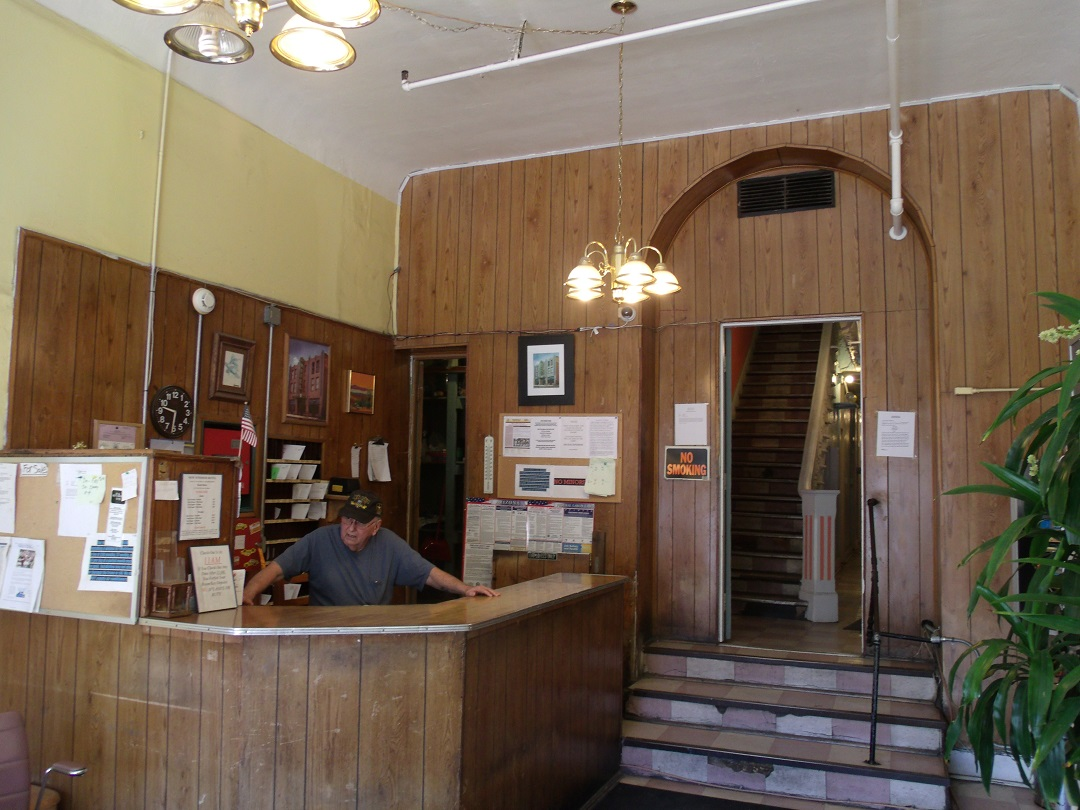
This is the service desk of the historic Windsor Hotel, originally called the "6th Avenue Hotel".

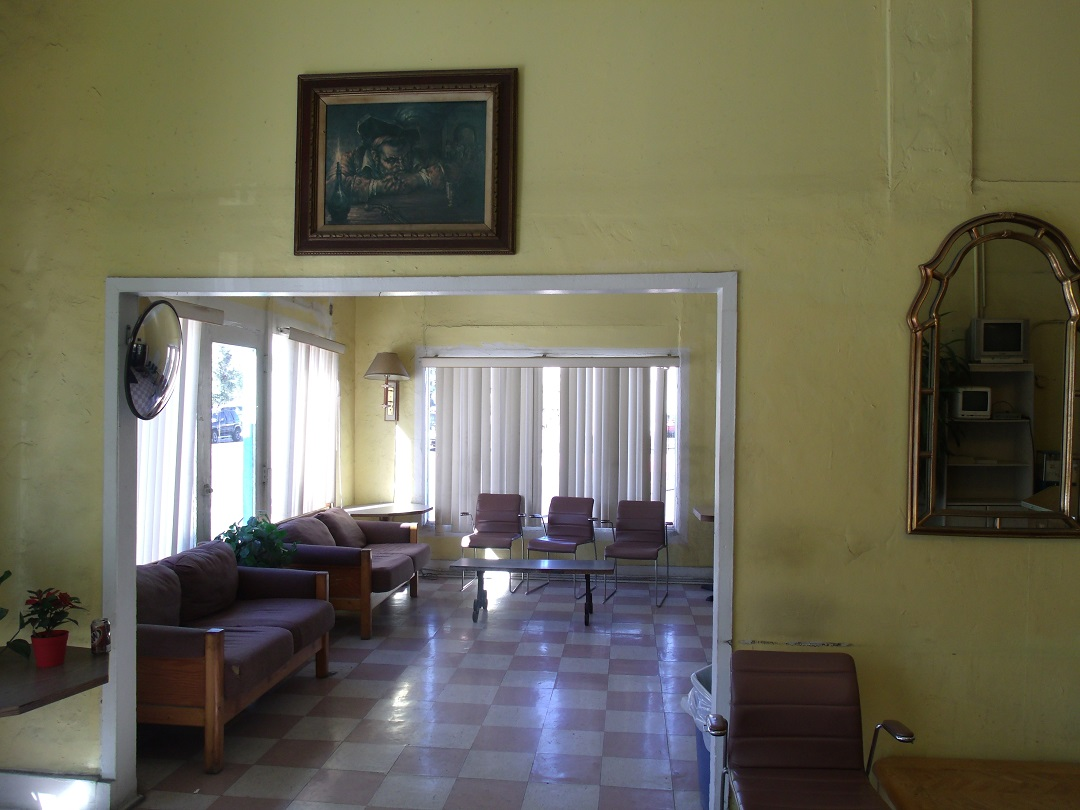
This is the lobby of the historic Windsor Hotel.

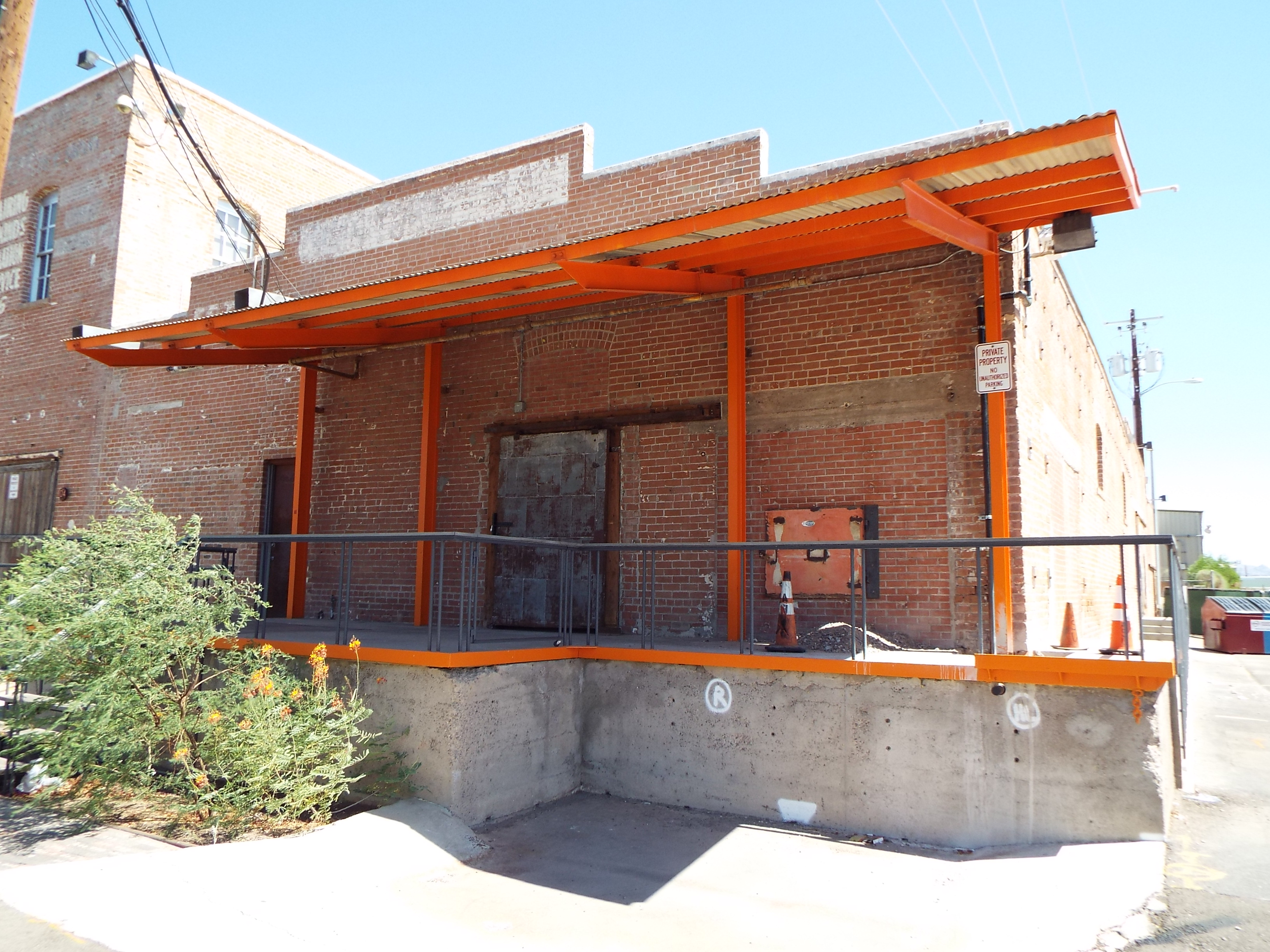
The Phoenix Cotton Oil Company Building was built in 1895 and is located at 606 E. Grant St. in Phoenix, Az. It is listed in the Phoenix Historic Property Register.

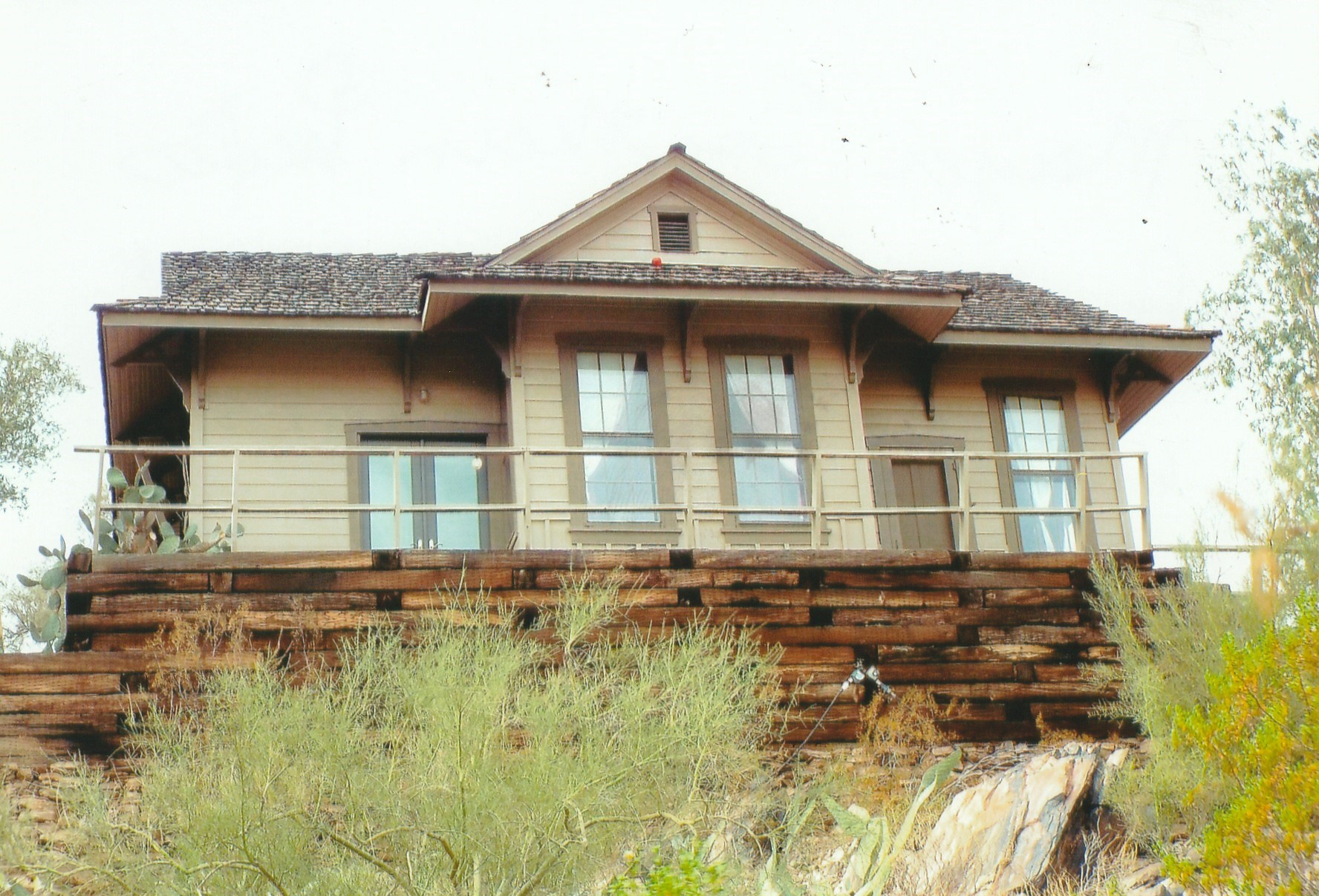
Historic Prescott and Eastern Railroad Depot built in 1898 in Mayer, Arizona. The building was purchased by a private citizen who had it hauled to a hill in Phoenix. The owner turned it into part of his home. It is located at 1711 N. 18th Place.

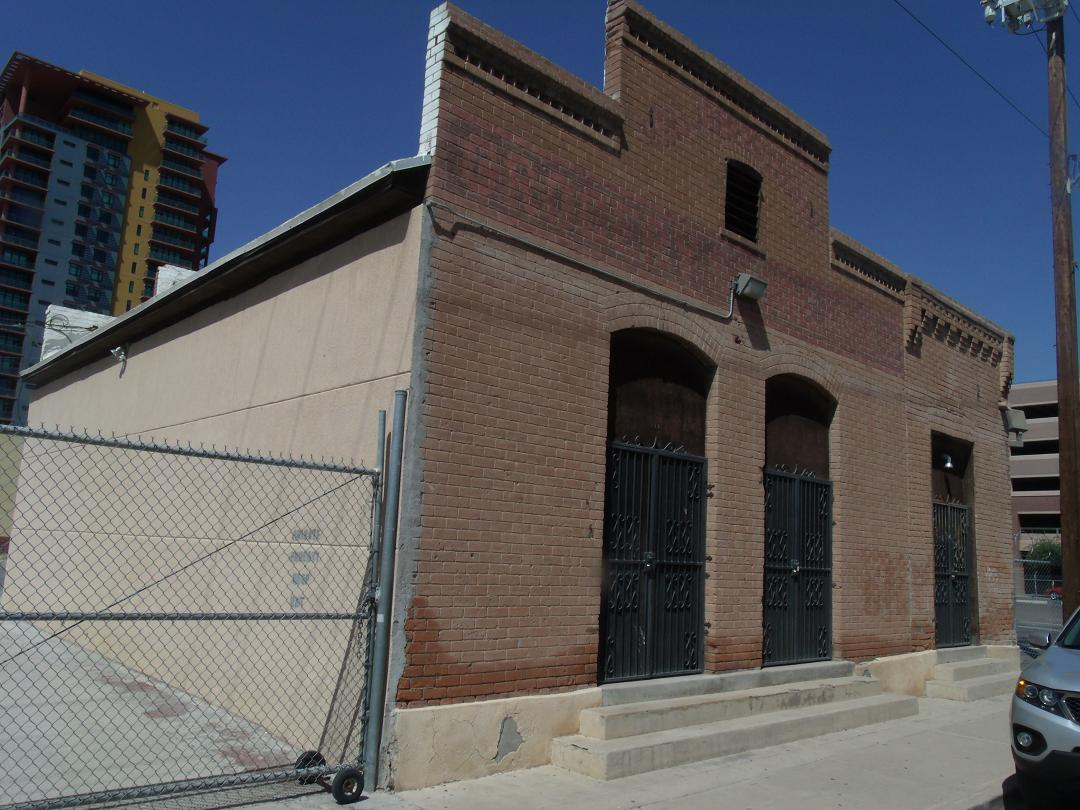
Arvizu's El Fresnal Grocery Store, also known as 25-23, was built in 1900 and is located at 310 E. Buchanan, Phoenix, Arizona. It was added to the National Register of Historic Places in 1985, reference: #85002046 (NRHP).

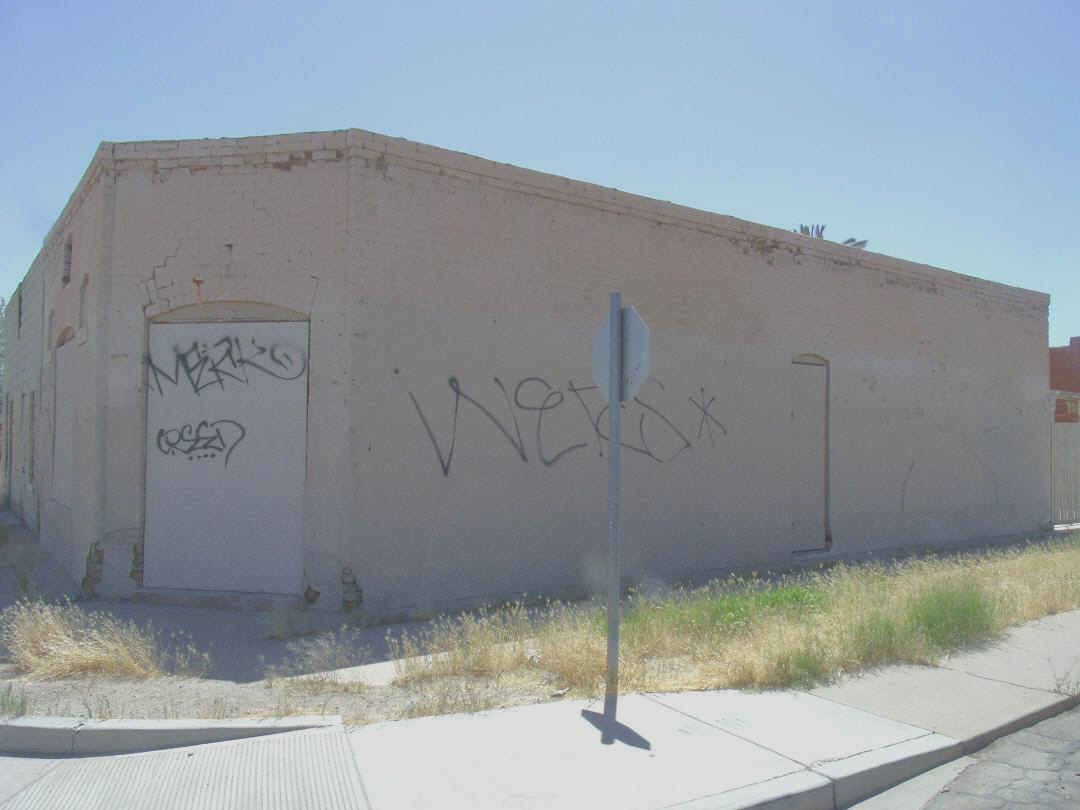
Yaun Ah Gim Groceries was built in 1900 and is located at 1002 S. 4th Avenue. The building which is in a state of abandonment, was listed in the National Register of Historic Places on July 8, 1986, reference: #86001553 (NRHP).

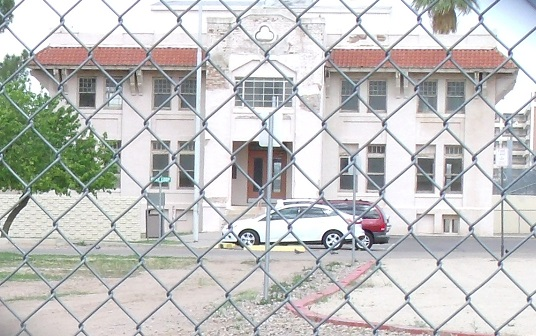
The Arizona State Hospital Building, also known as Mahoney Administration Building, was built in 1900 and is located at 2500 E. Van Buren St. It was listed in the National Register of Historic Places on July 15, 2009, reference #09000510.

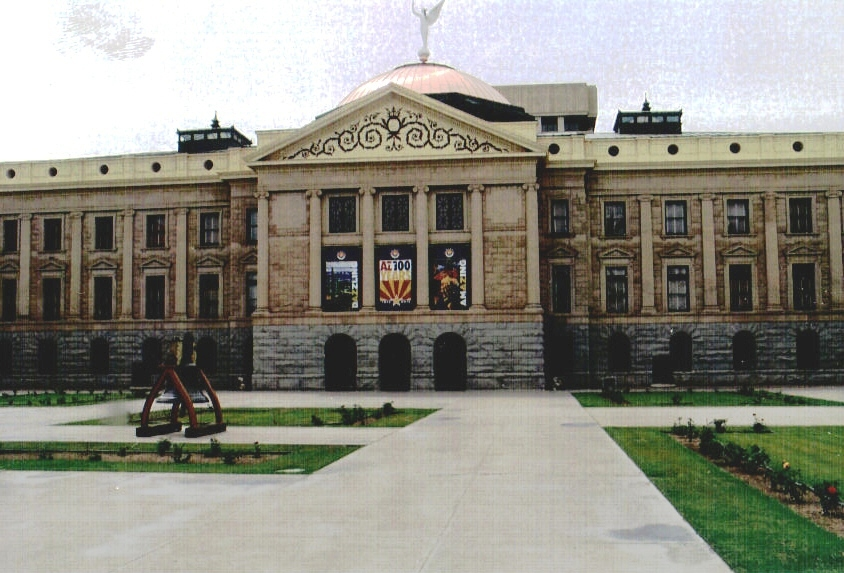
The Arizona State Capitol building was built in 1900 and is located at 1700 W. Washington. It was listed in the National Register of Historic Places on October 29, 1974, ref. #74000455.

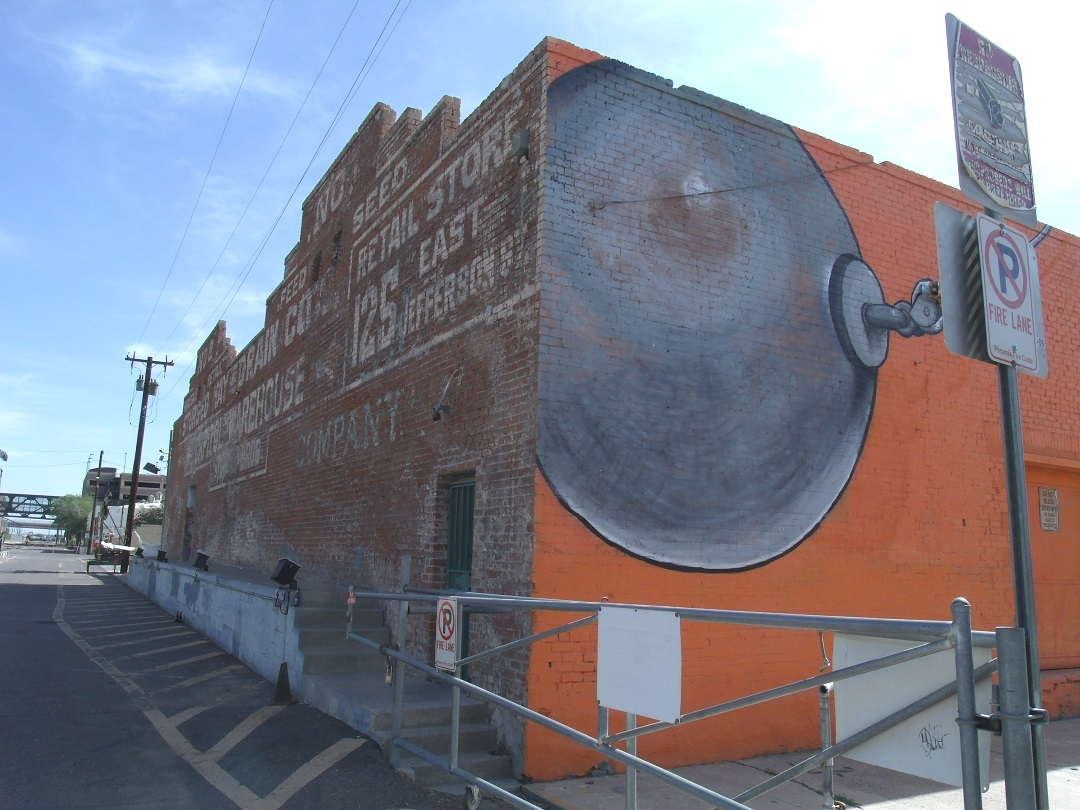
Phoenix Seed and Feed Warehouse built in 1905 and located at 411 S. Second St. It is the oldest warehouse in the original Phoenix town-site. Listed in the National Register of Historic Places, reference: #85002071

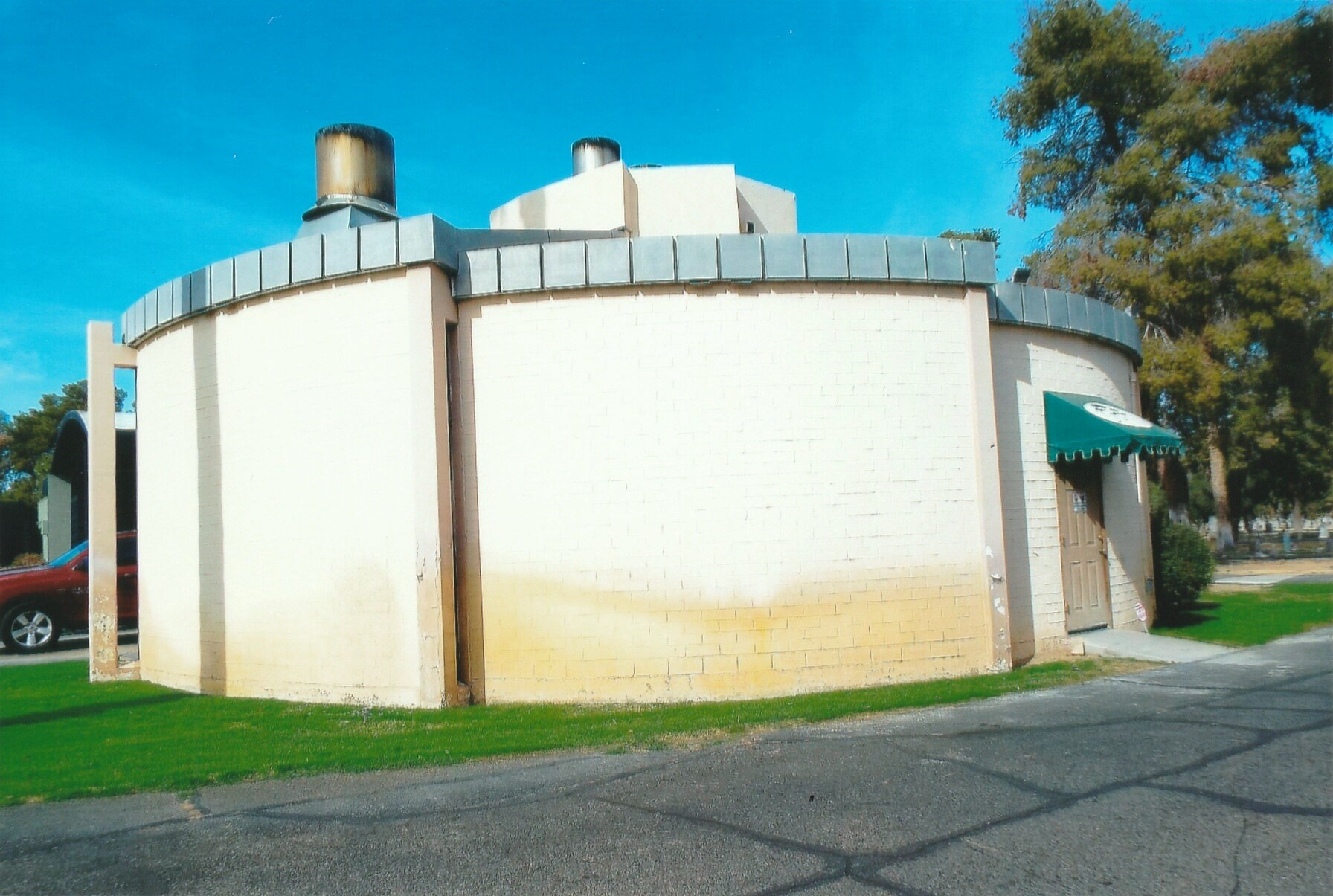
The originalGreenwood Memorial Park Crematorium built in 1906. It is located on the grounds of the Greenwood/Memory Lawn Mortuary & Cemetery

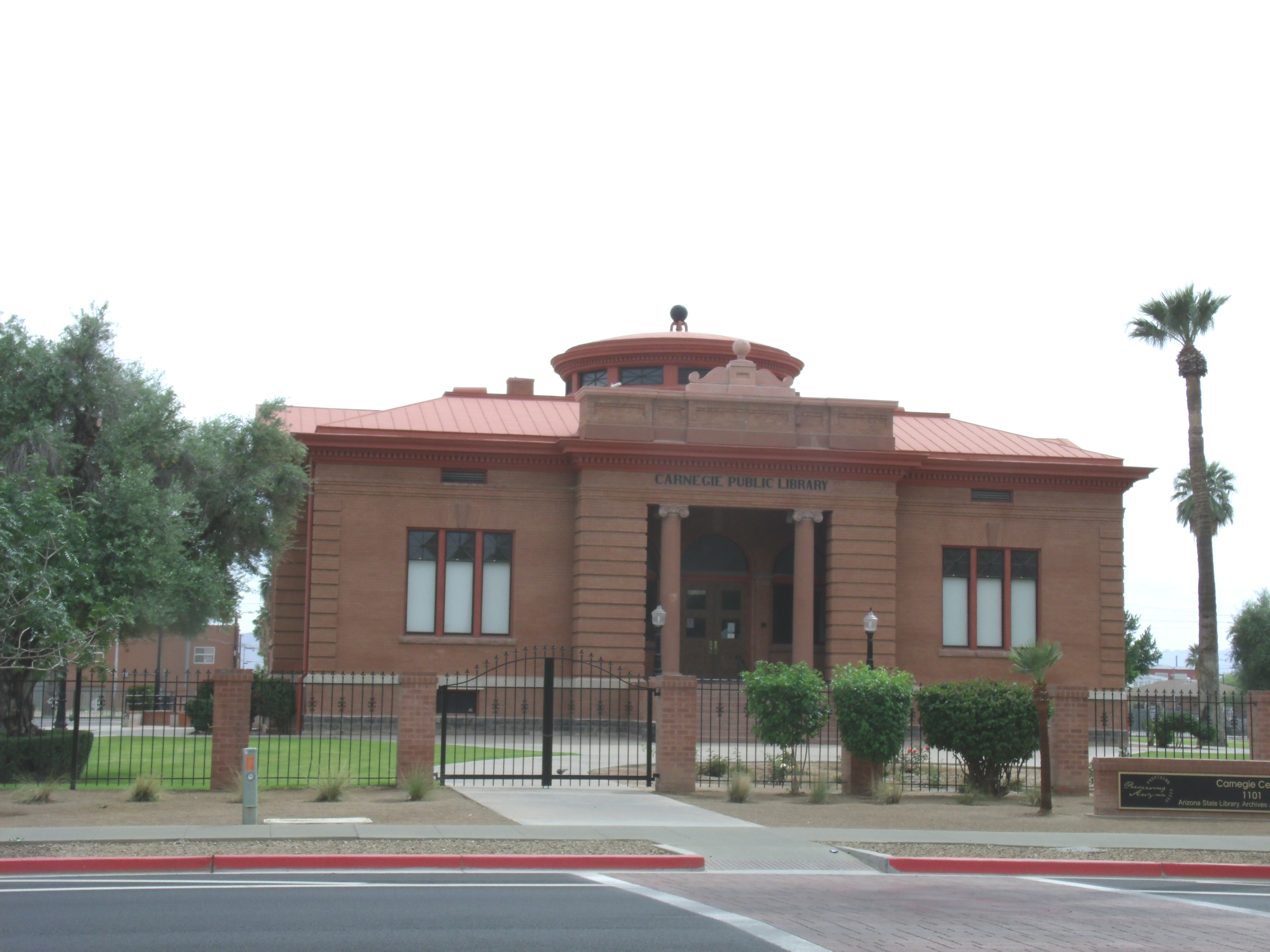
The Phoenix Carnegie Library was built in 1907 and is located at 1101 W. Washington St. The property is listed in the National Register of Historic Places.

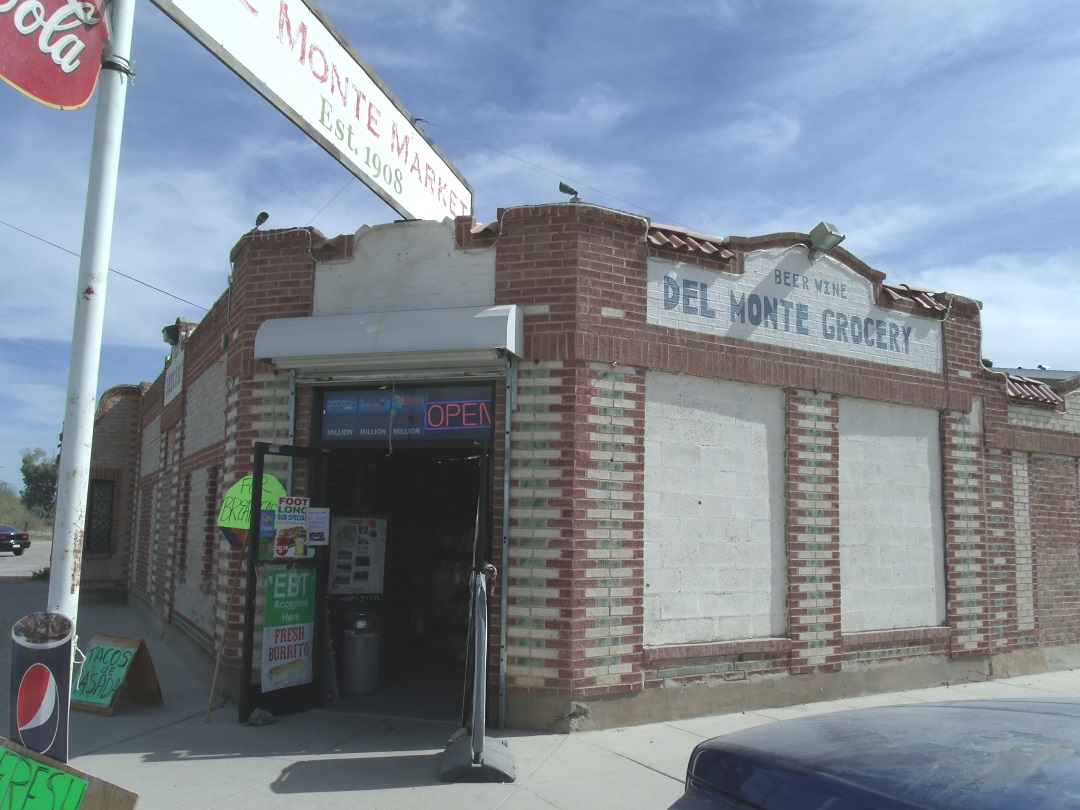
The Del Monte Market built in 1908 and located at 2659 W. Dobbins Road in South Mountain Village, an urban village within the city of Phoenix. It is the oldest continuously operating market in the state. Designated as a landmark with Historic Preservation-Landmark (HP-L) overlay zoning (Phoenix Historic Property Register).

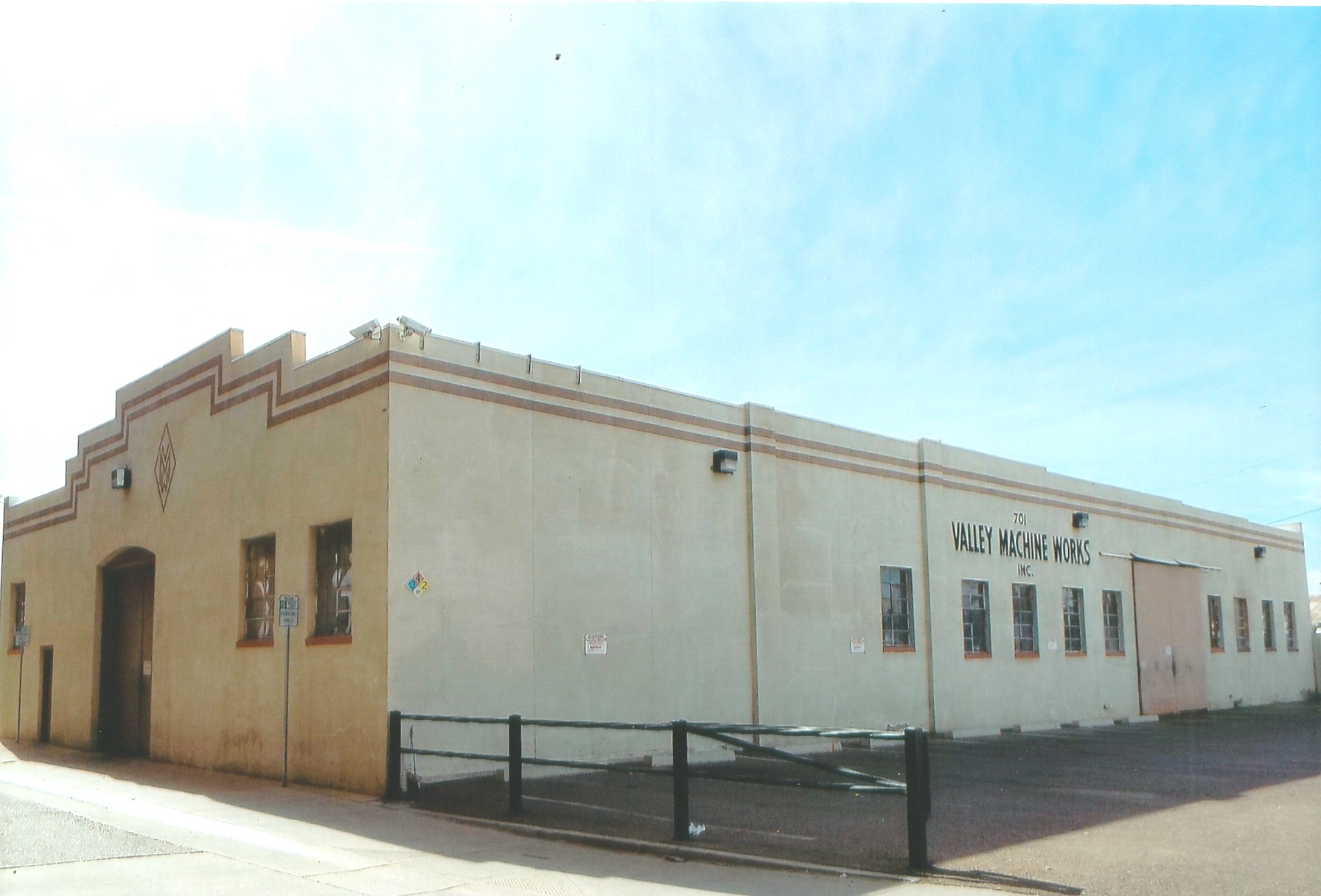
The Valley Machine Works built in 1909 and located in 701 West Jackson Street.

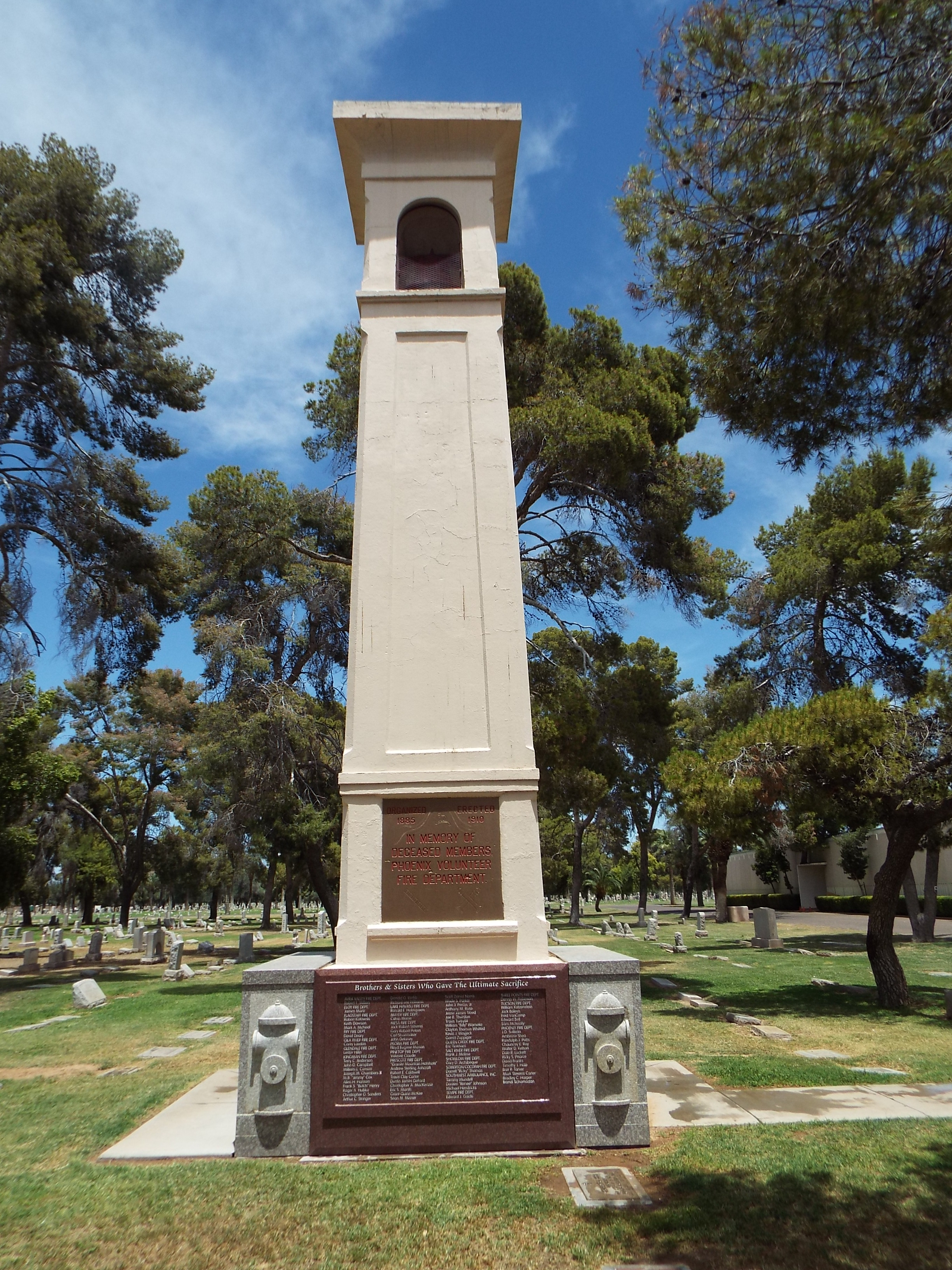
Phoenix Volunteer Firefighters Monument built in 1910 and located on the grounds of the Greenwood/Memory Lawn Mortuary & Cemetery.

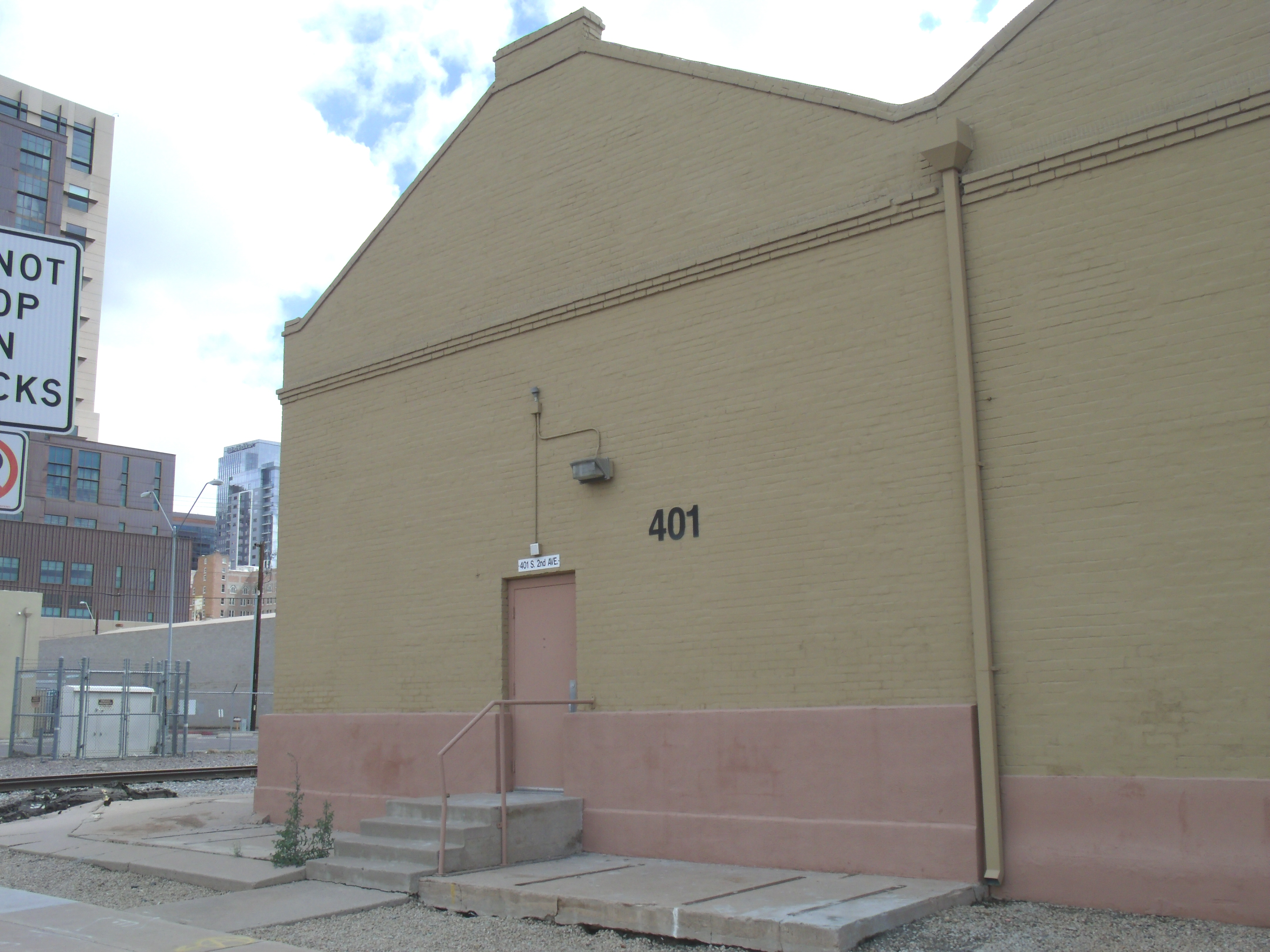
The Gas Works building was built in 1910 and is located at 401 S. Second Avenue. It was listed in the Phoenix Historic Property Register in July 2000.

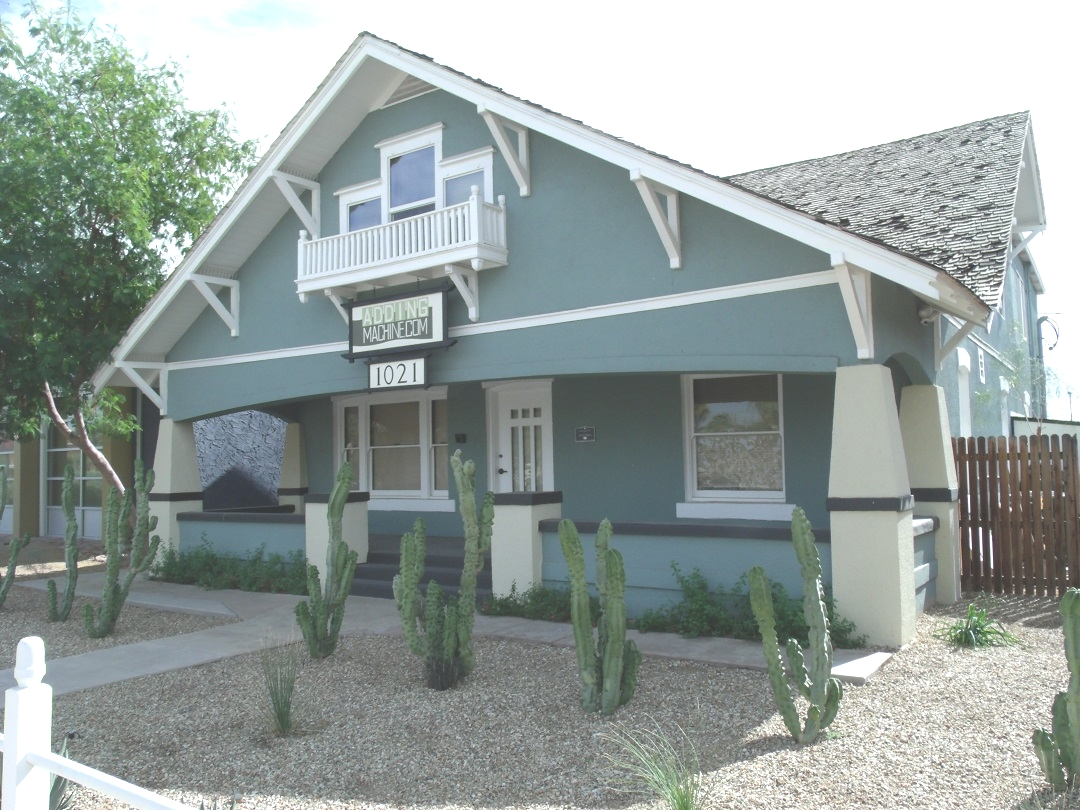
The Swindall Tourist Inn was built in 1913 and is located at 1021 E. Washington St. Prior to 1964, public accommodations in Phoenix and Arizona were segregated. African Americans were not allowed to stay in the hotels in downtown Phoenix. The structure, which is listed in the National Register of Historic Places, reference: #95001081, is the only known surviving African-American boarding house in Phoenix.

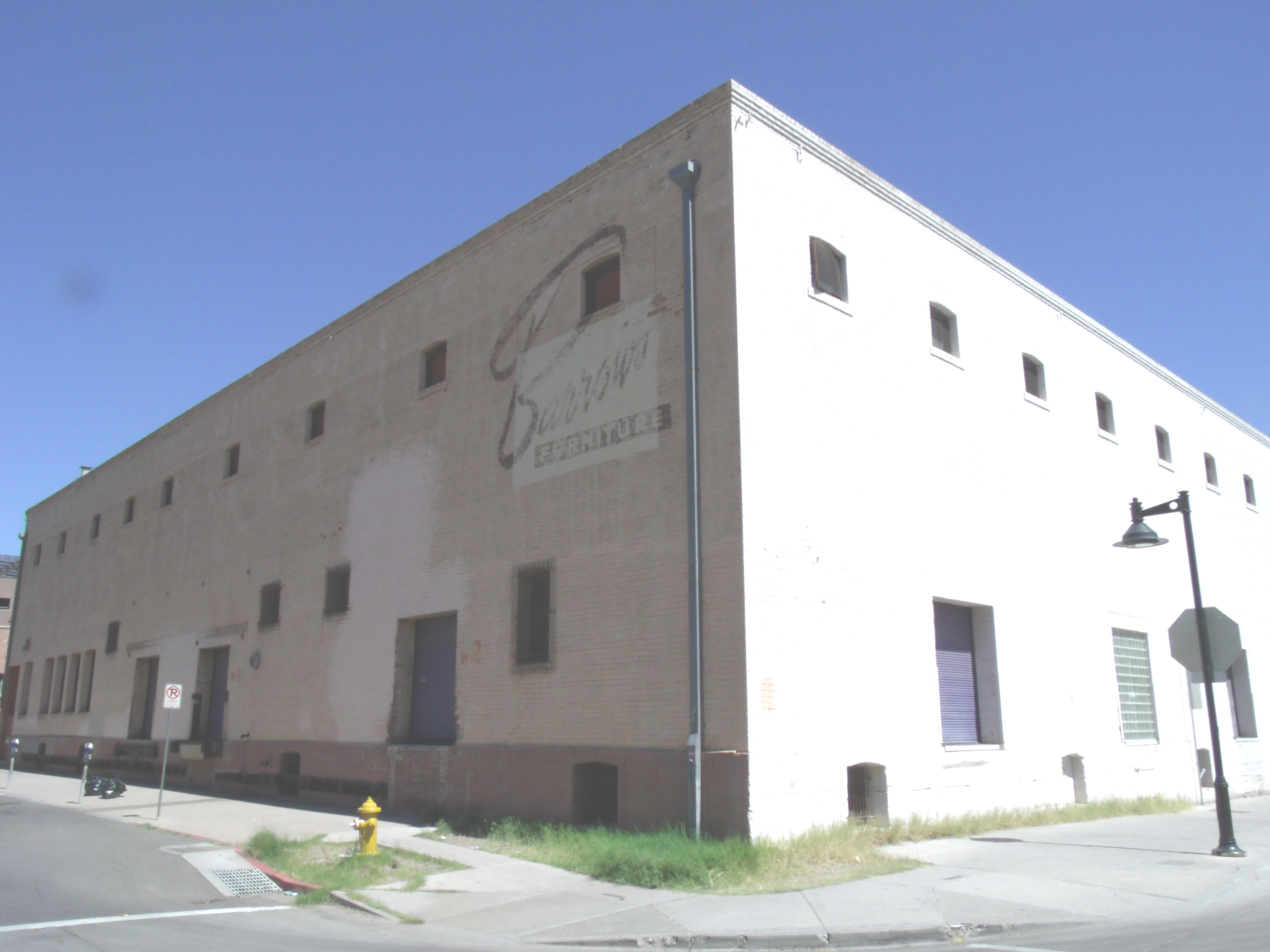
The Wakelin (E.S.) Grocery Company Warehouse was built in 1913 and is located in the corner of 219 S. Fifth Avenue / 440 W. Jackson St. It was listed in the Phoenix Historic Property Register in July 2000.

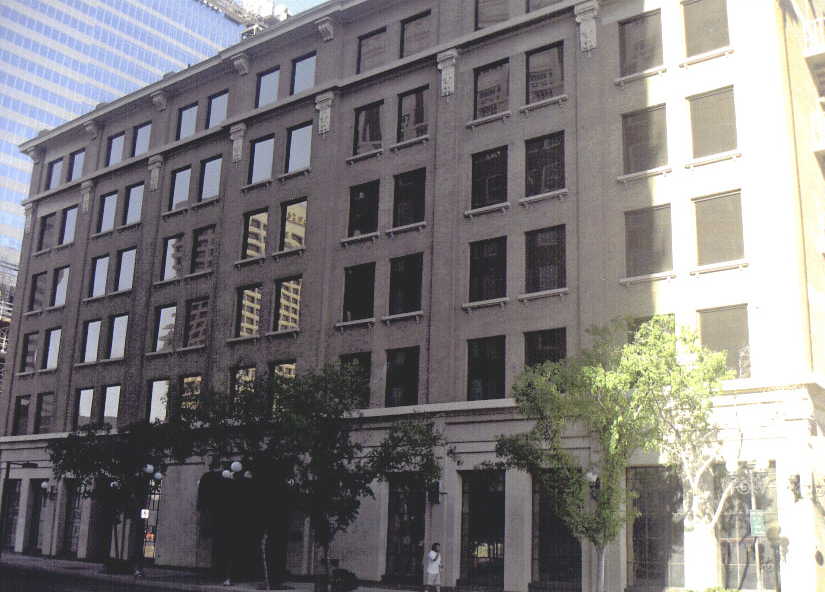
The Jefferson Hotel was built in 1915 and is located at 101 S. Central Avenue in Phoenix. It is no longer a hotel and is called the Barrister Place Building. The building is owned by the city of Phoenix and is currently the home to the Phoenix Police Museum (Phoenix Historic Property Register).

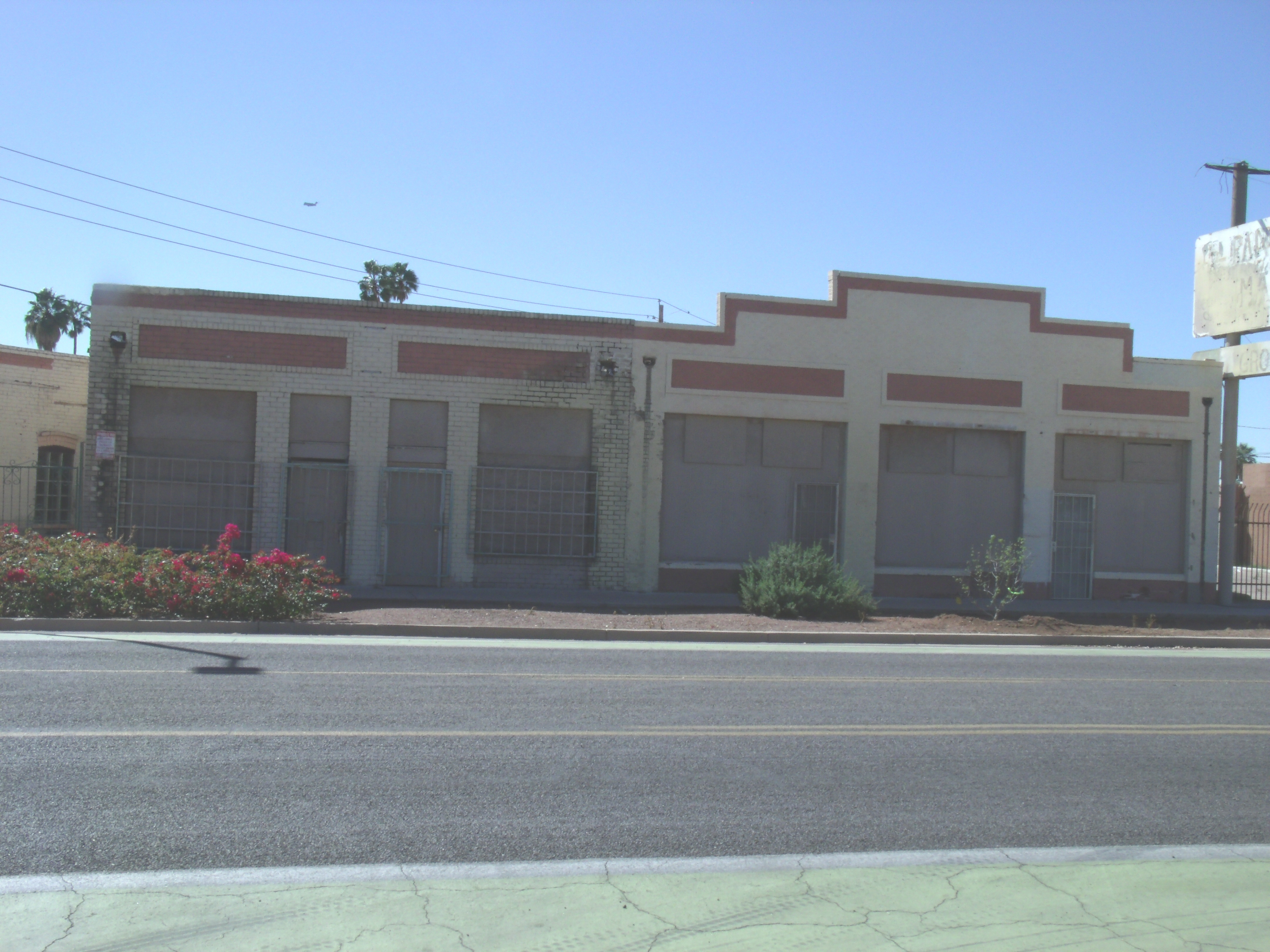
The Durand Grocery building was constructed in 1916 and is located at 901 W. Grand Avenue. The building was listed in the National Register of Historic Places on October 1, 1985, reference: #85002891.

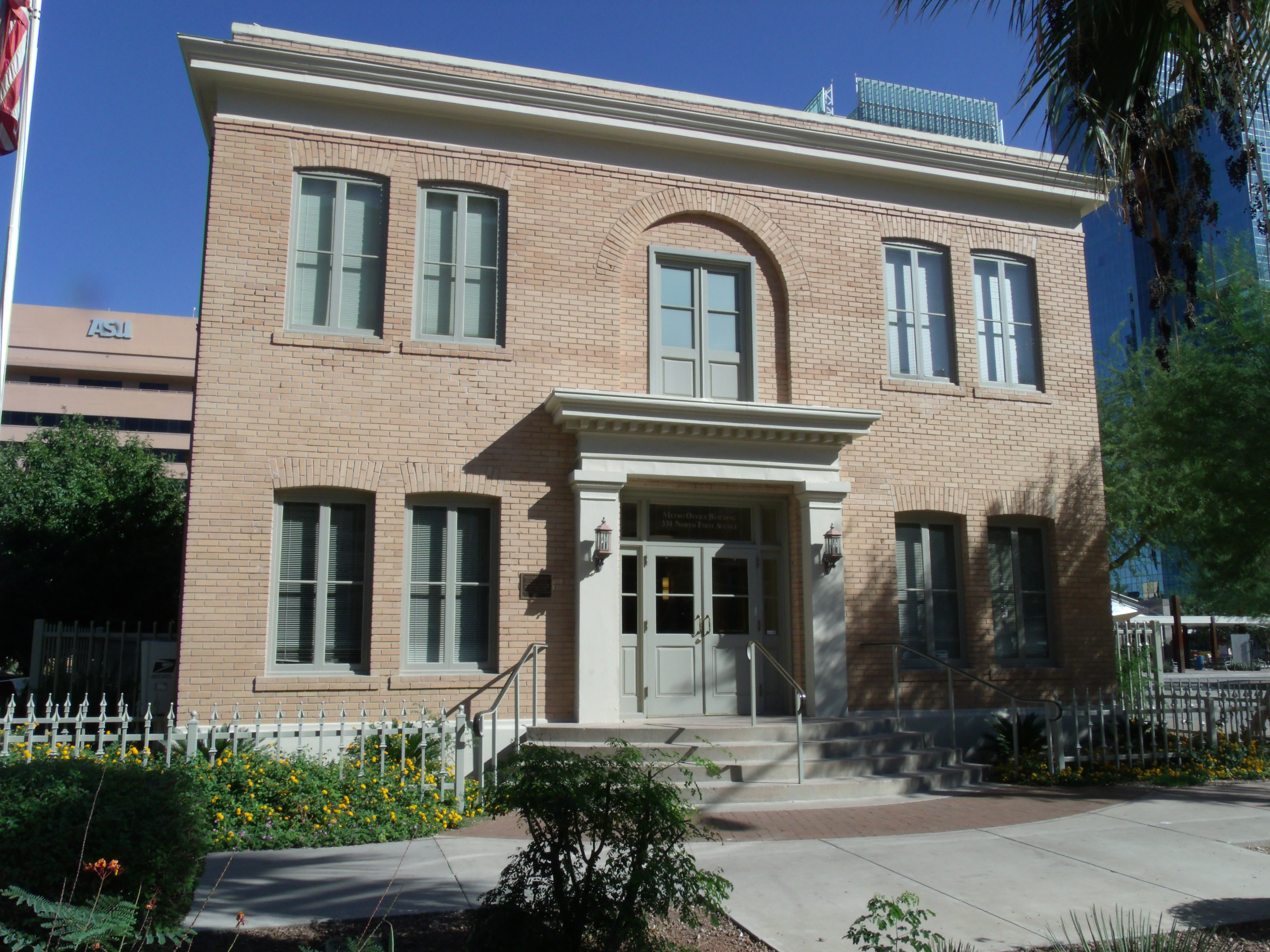
The Phoenix Elementary School District #1 Administration Building was built in 1917 and is located at 331 N. 1st Avenue. the building was listed in the Phoenix Historic Property Register in October 1996.

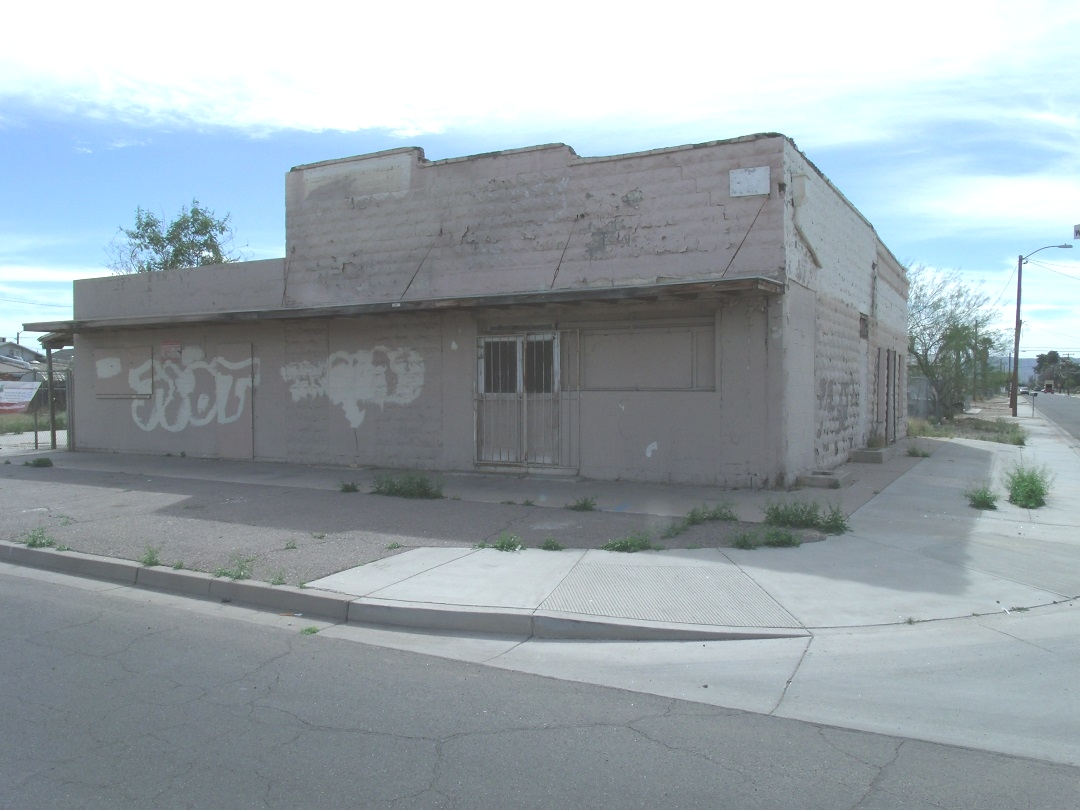
The Luis Lugo Bakery, also known as "La Patellera", was built in 1917 and is located at 415 W. Sherman St. This structure is one of the earliest Hispanic commercial properties in Phoenix. Designated as a landmark with Historic Preservation-Landmark (HP-L) overlay zoning (Phoenix Historic Property Register).

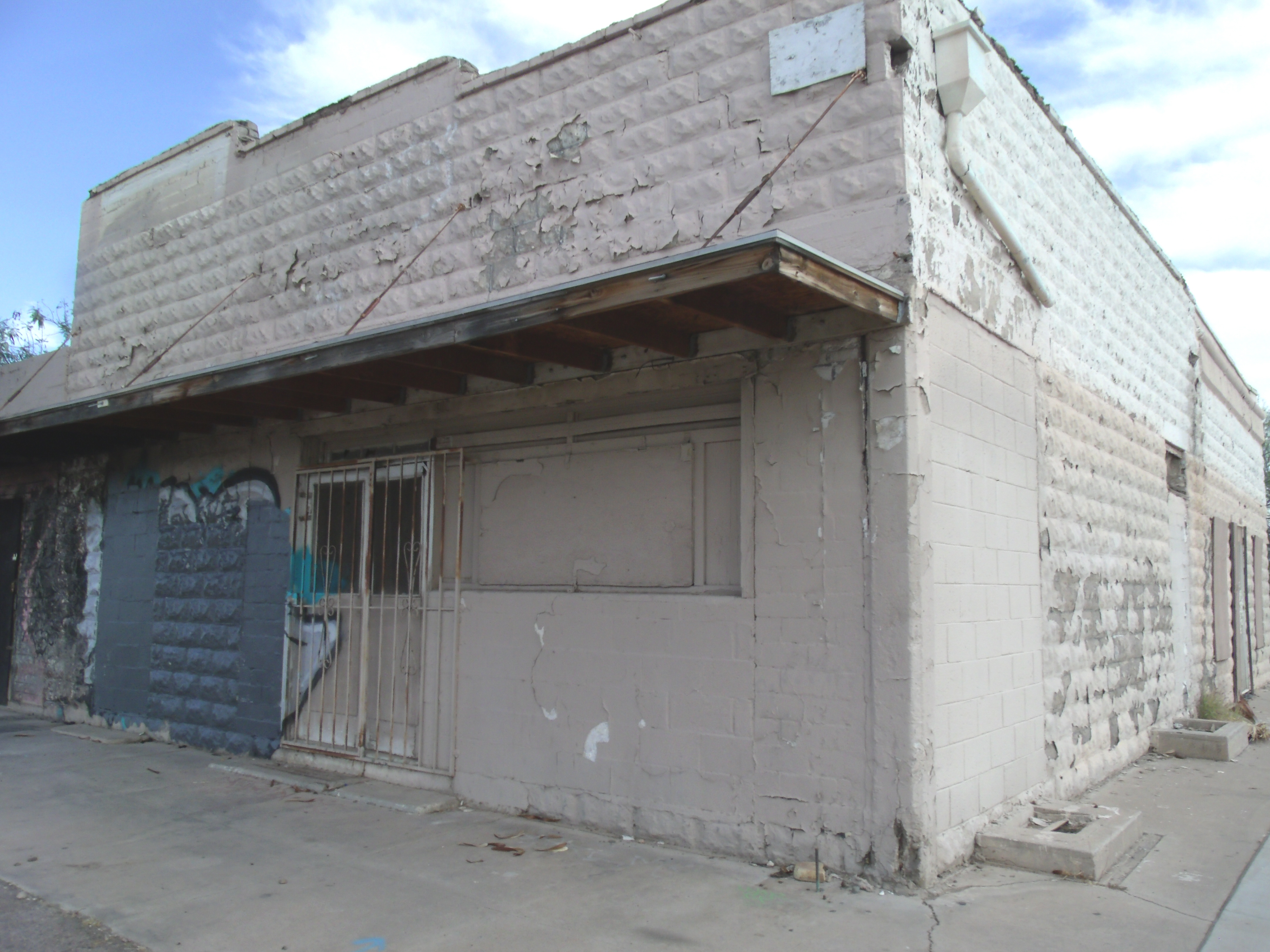
Different view of the Luis Lugo Bakery also known as "La Patellera".

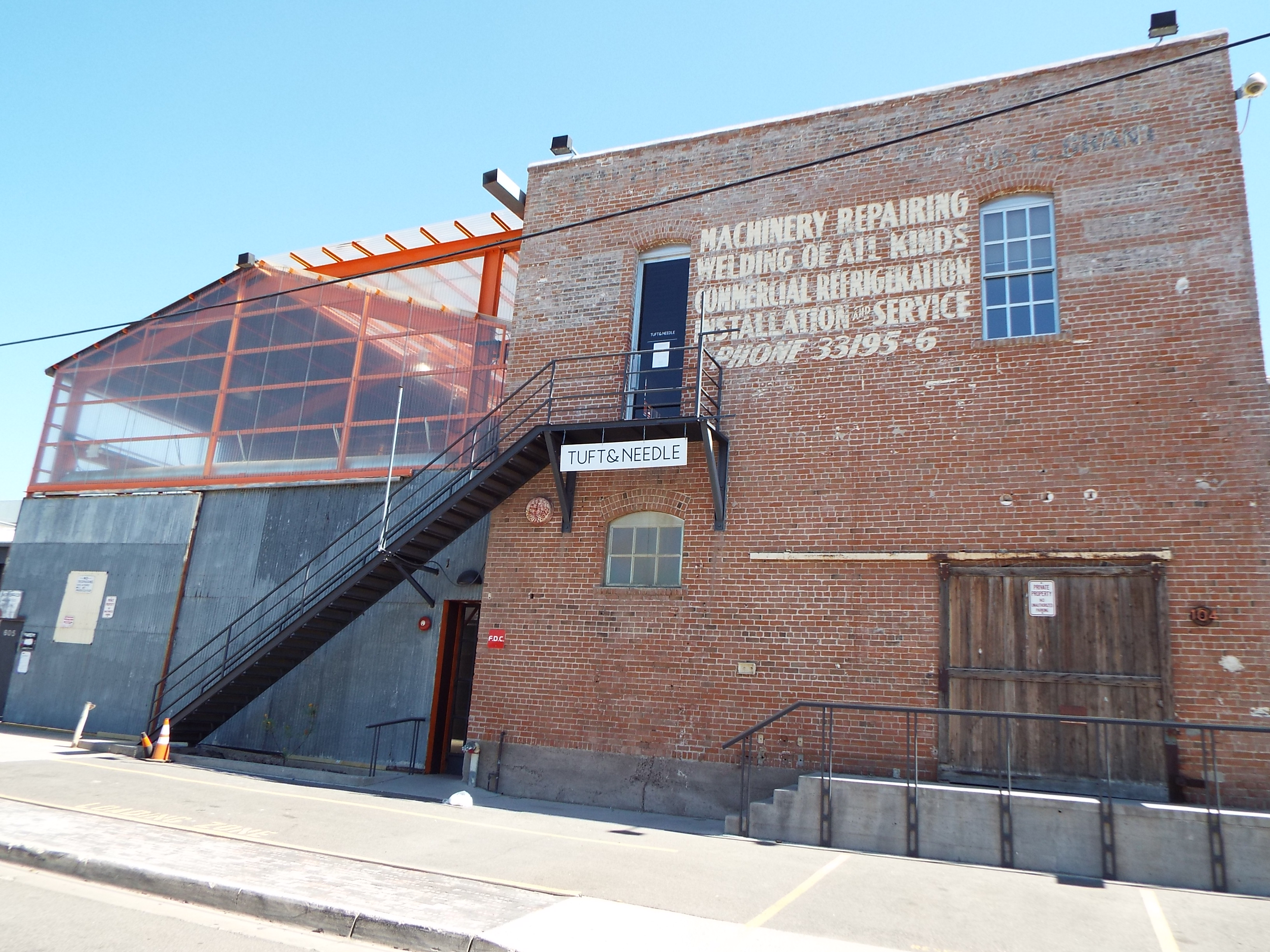
The two-story Southwest Cotton Co./Karlson Machine Works building was built in 1918 and is located at 104 E. Grant Street. Designated as a landmark with Historic Preservation-Landmark (HP-L) overlay zoning. Listed in the Phoenix Historic Property Register.

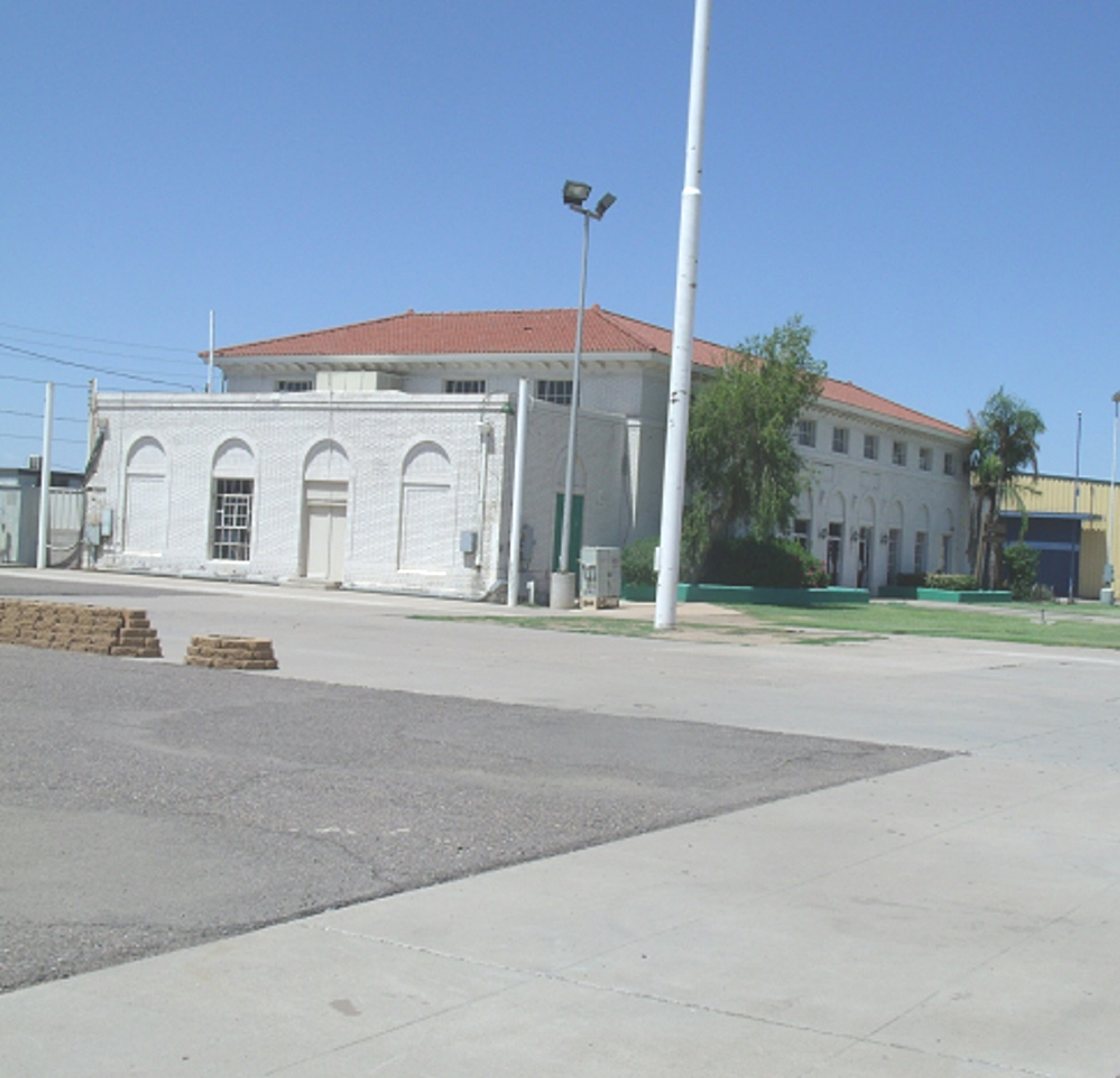
The Gem and Mineral Building built in 1918 on the Arizona State Fairgrounds which is located at 1826 West McDowell Road. It is currently the oldest building there. Listed in the Phoenix Historic Property Register

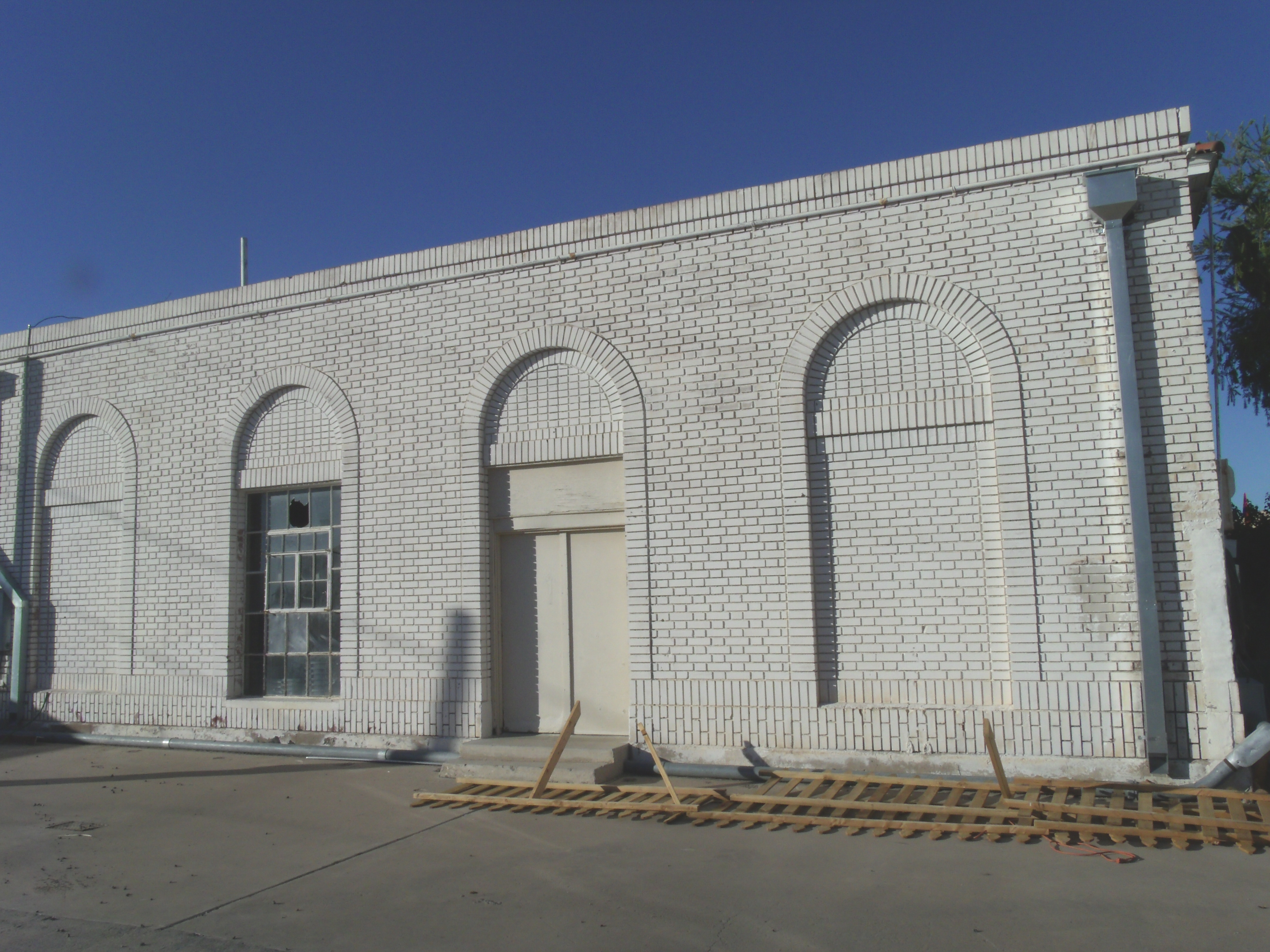
The side wall of the Gem and Mineral Building

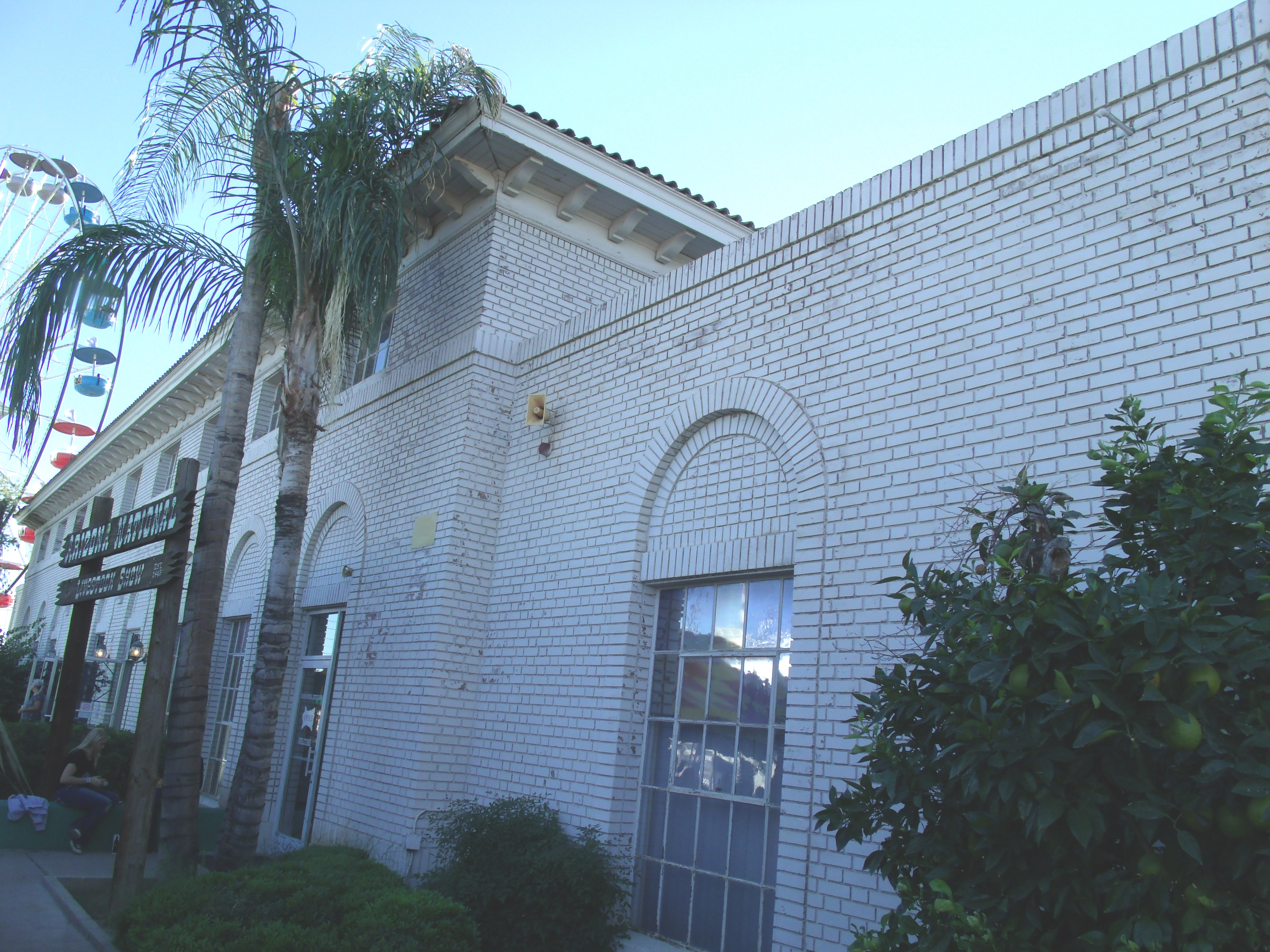
Close-up view of the Gem and Mineral Building

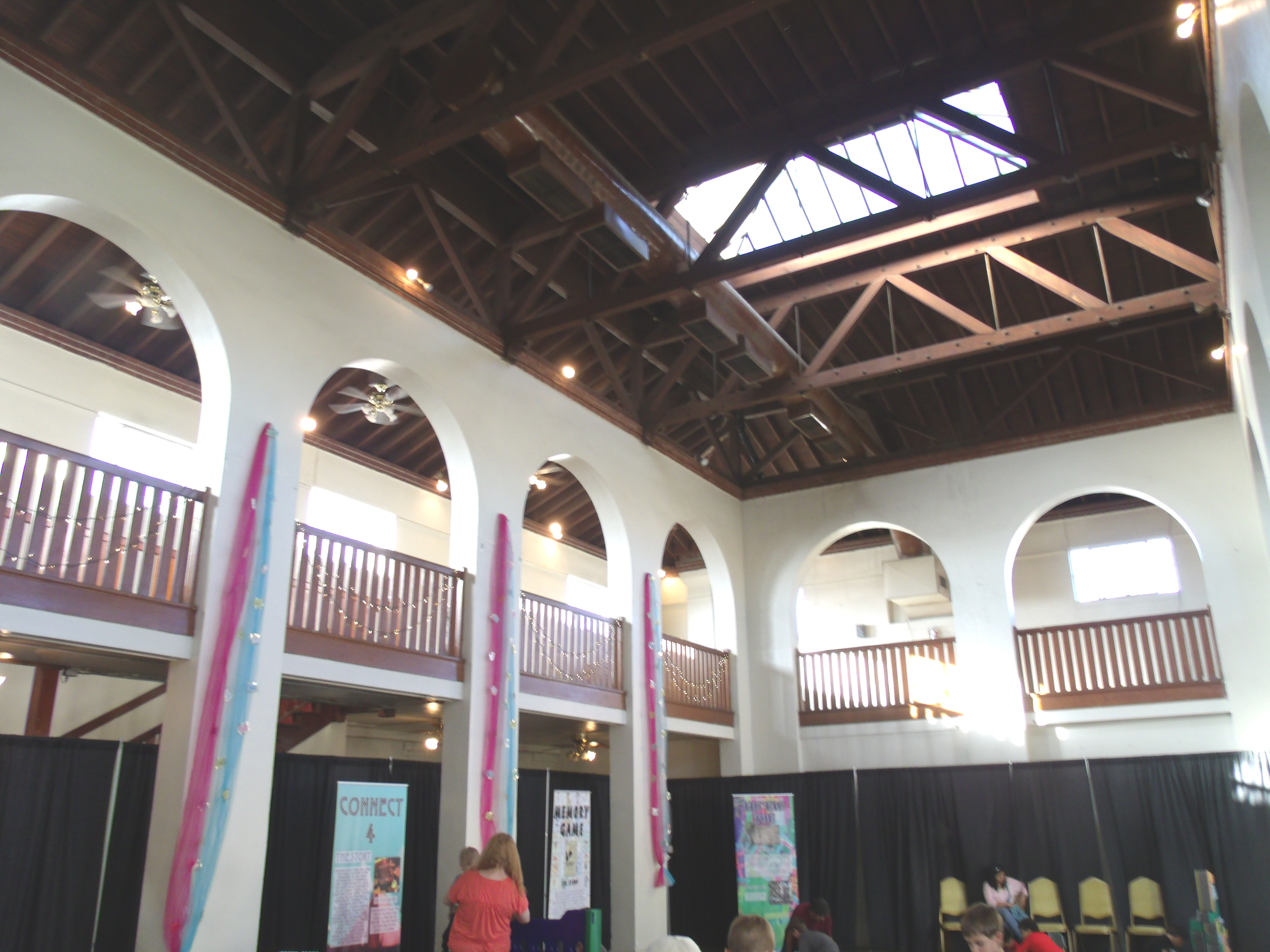
Inside the Gem and Mineral Building

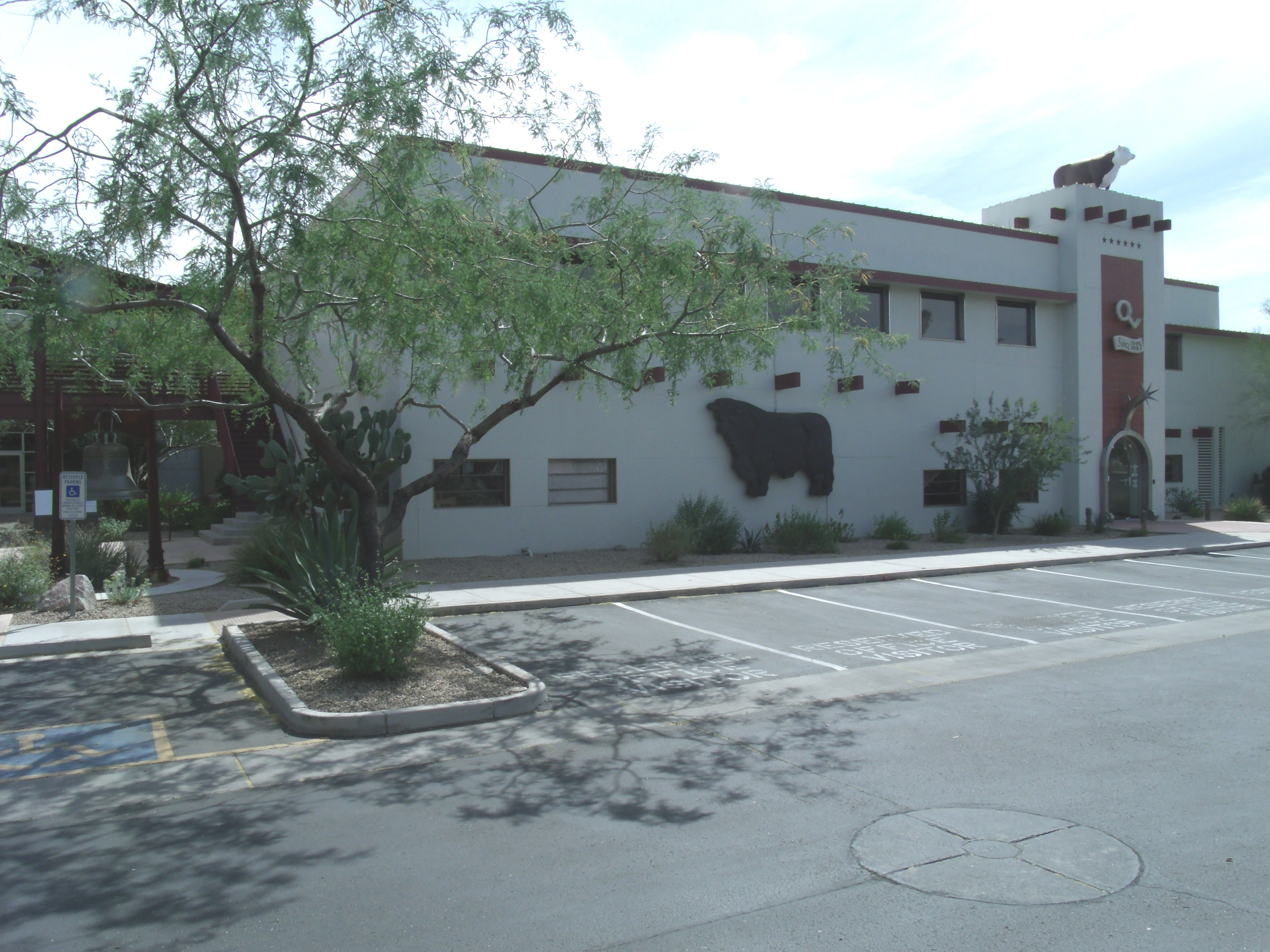
The Tovrea Land and Cattle Co. Administration Building / Stockyards Restaurant is located at 5009 E. Washington St. In 1919, Edward A. Tovrea, the "Cattle Baron," opened his Phoenix packing house west of 48th Street and Van Buren to support his growing beef operations. The Tovrea Land and Cattle Co. had grown to nearly 40,000 head of cattle secured by 200 acres of cattle pens, making it the world's largest feedlot. In 1947, The Stockyards Restaurant officially opened and quickly became a favorite gathering place for cattlemen, bankers and politicians. Although cattle fortunes faded in the late 1950s and pens slowly gave way to urban growth, the popularity of Arizona's Original Steakhouse remained intact. The property was listed in the Phoenix Historic Property Register in March 2004.

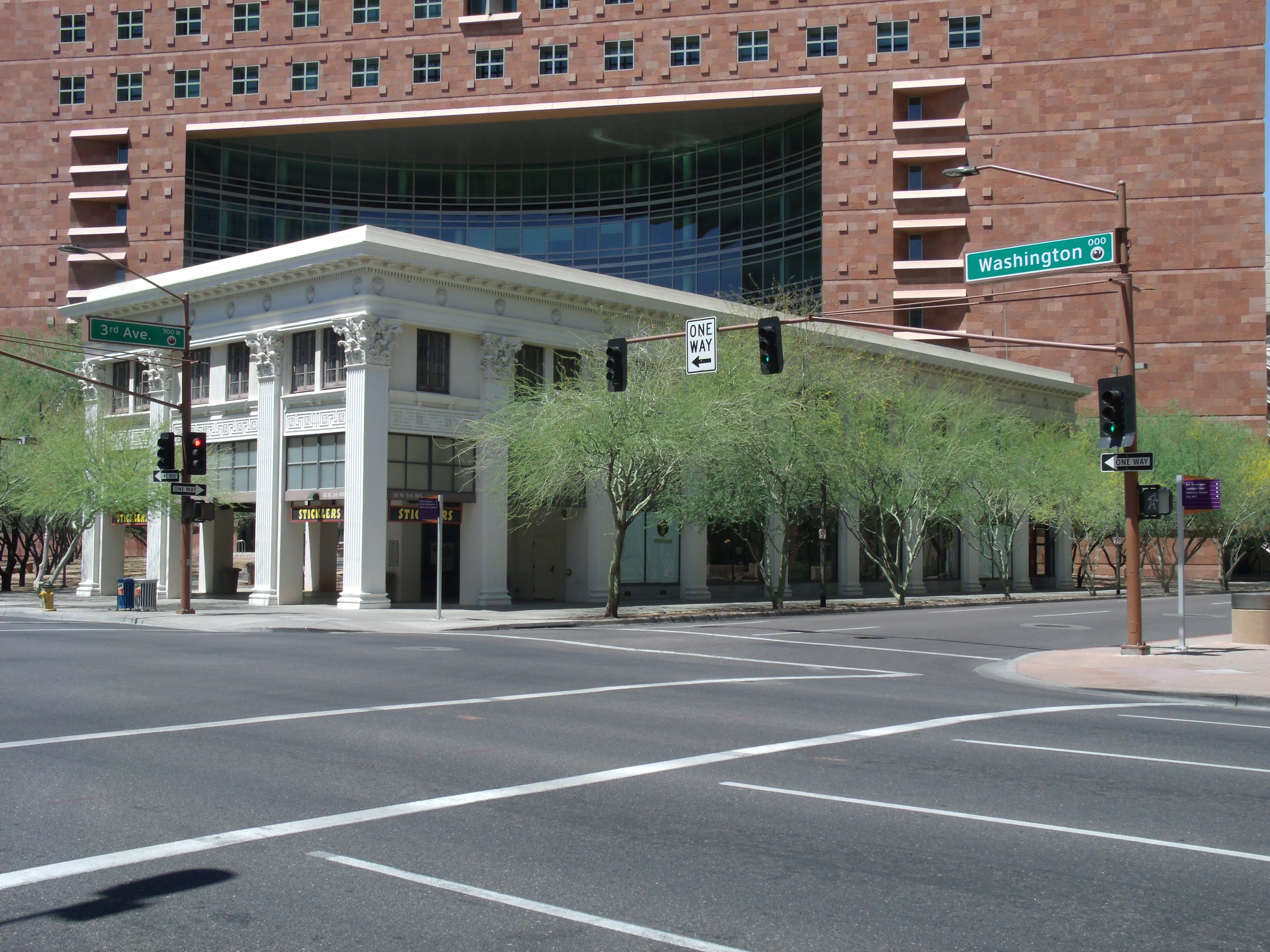
J.W. Walker Building, also known as the Central Arizona Light and Power Building, was built in 1920. The building is located at 12th N. 4th Avenue. It was added to the National Register of Historic Places in 1985, reference: #85002077.

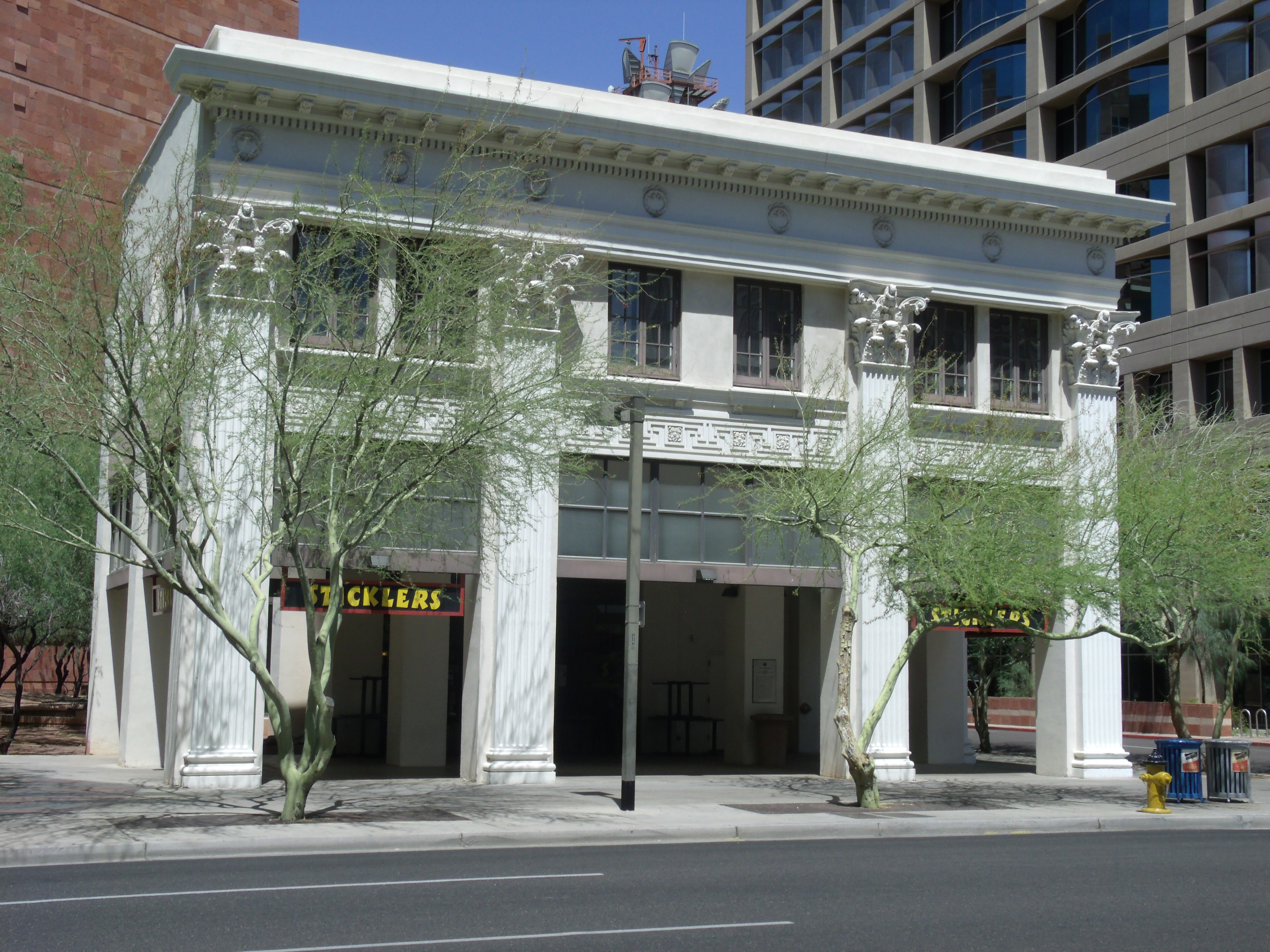
Front view of the J.W. Walker Building.

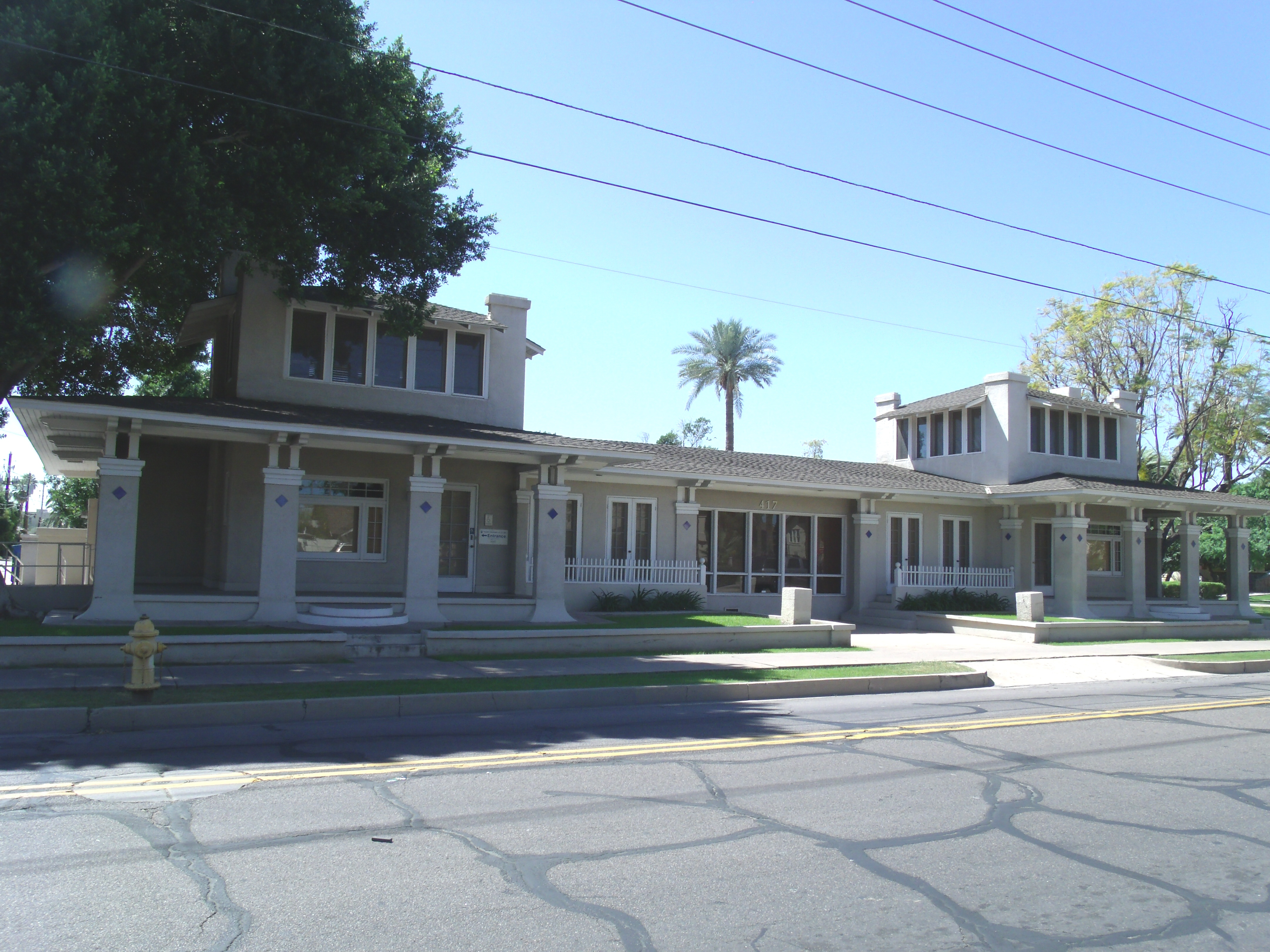
The Corpstein Duplex was built in 1920 and is located at 417 W. Roosevelt St. It was listed in the Phoenix Historic Property Register in September 1986.

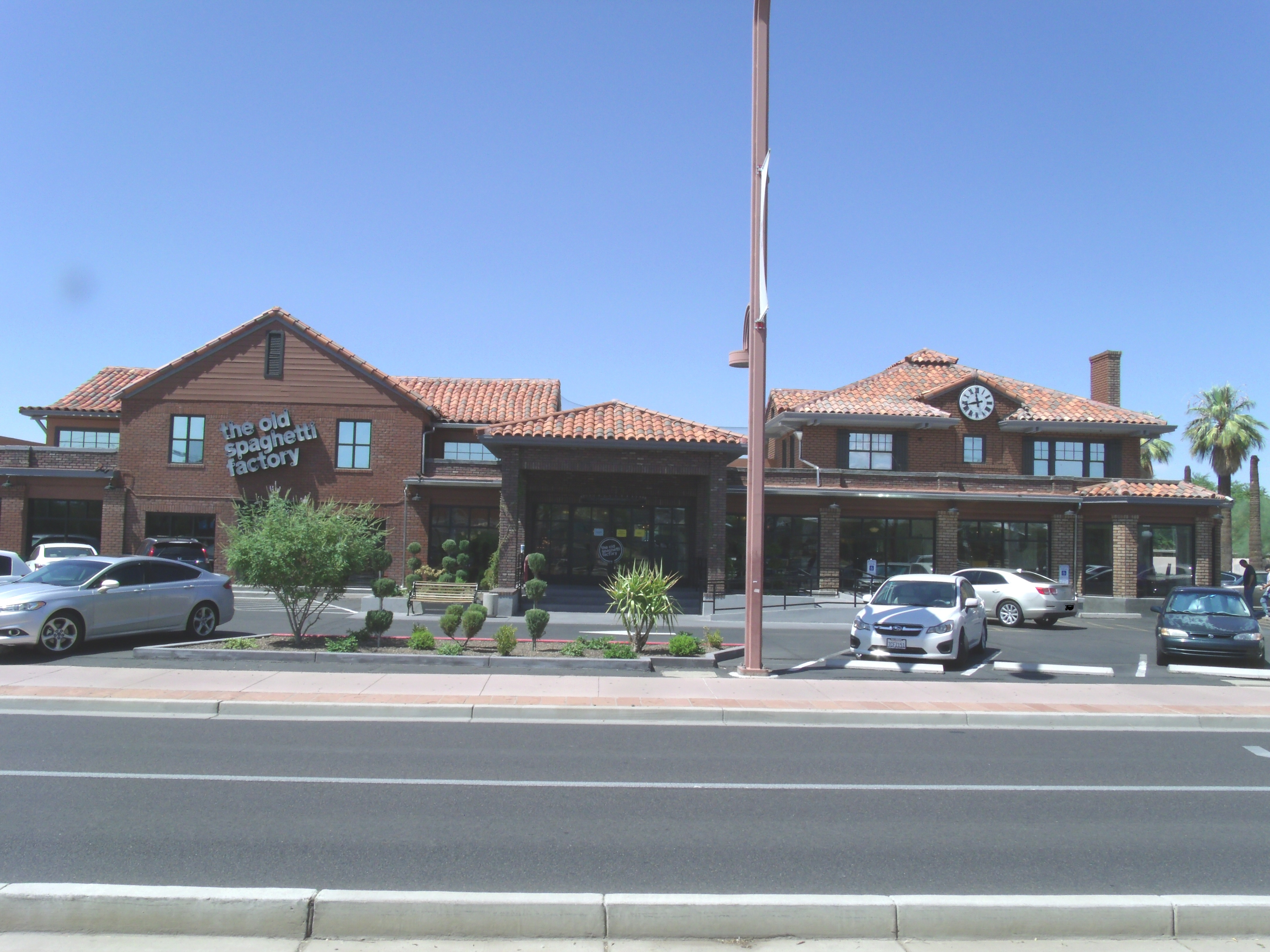
The Cole Mansion and Baker House were built in the 1920s and are located at 1418 N. Central Avenue in Phoenix. The Cole family purchased the Baker house and in 1940 connected both houses with a building in between. The structure has been occupied by the SpaghettI Factory Restaurant since 1996. It is listed on the Phoenix Historic Property Register.

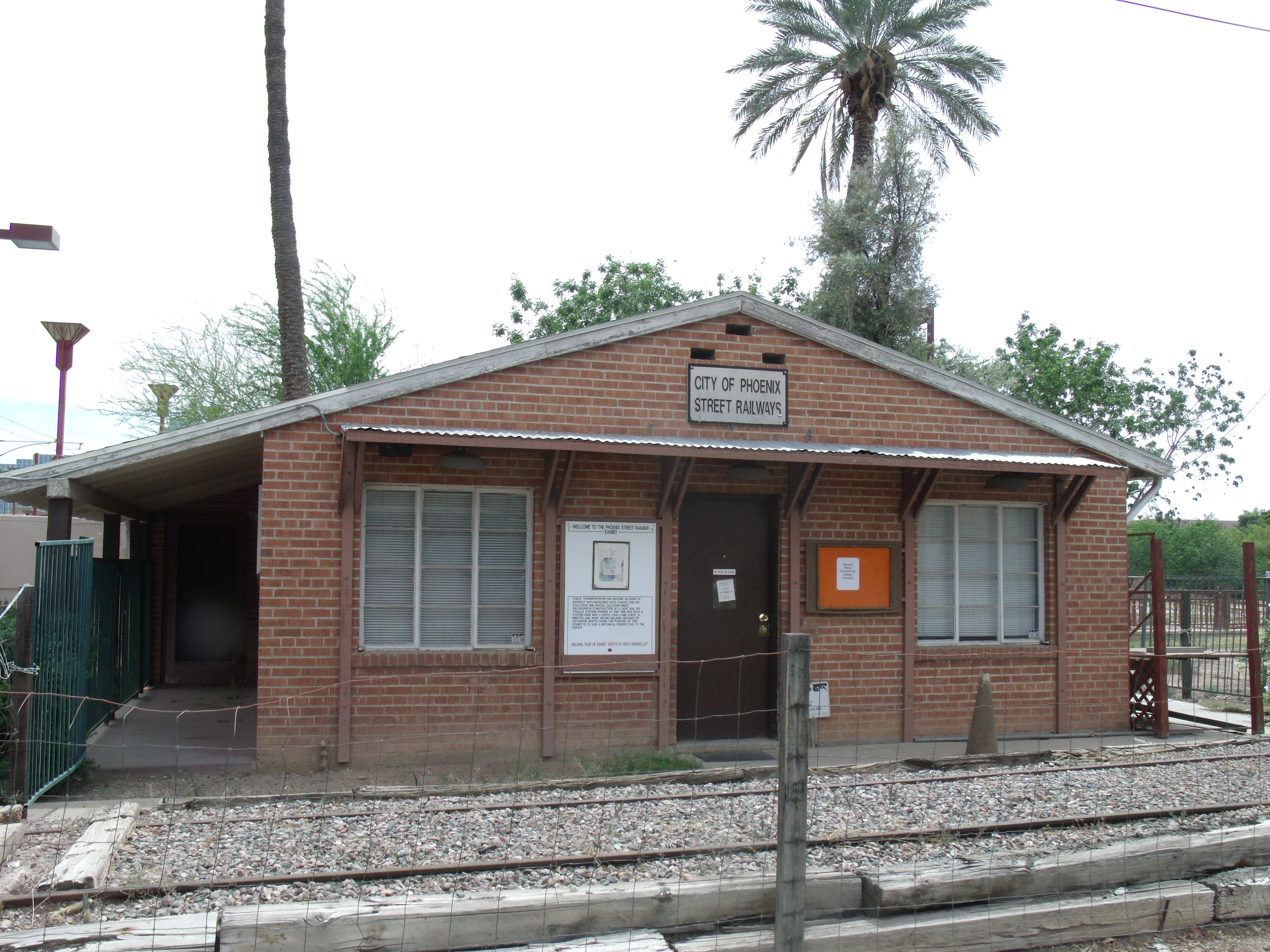
The Dr. Shackelford Dental Office Building which currently houses a small exhibit of the Arizona Street Railway Museum. Listed in the Phoenix Historic Property Register

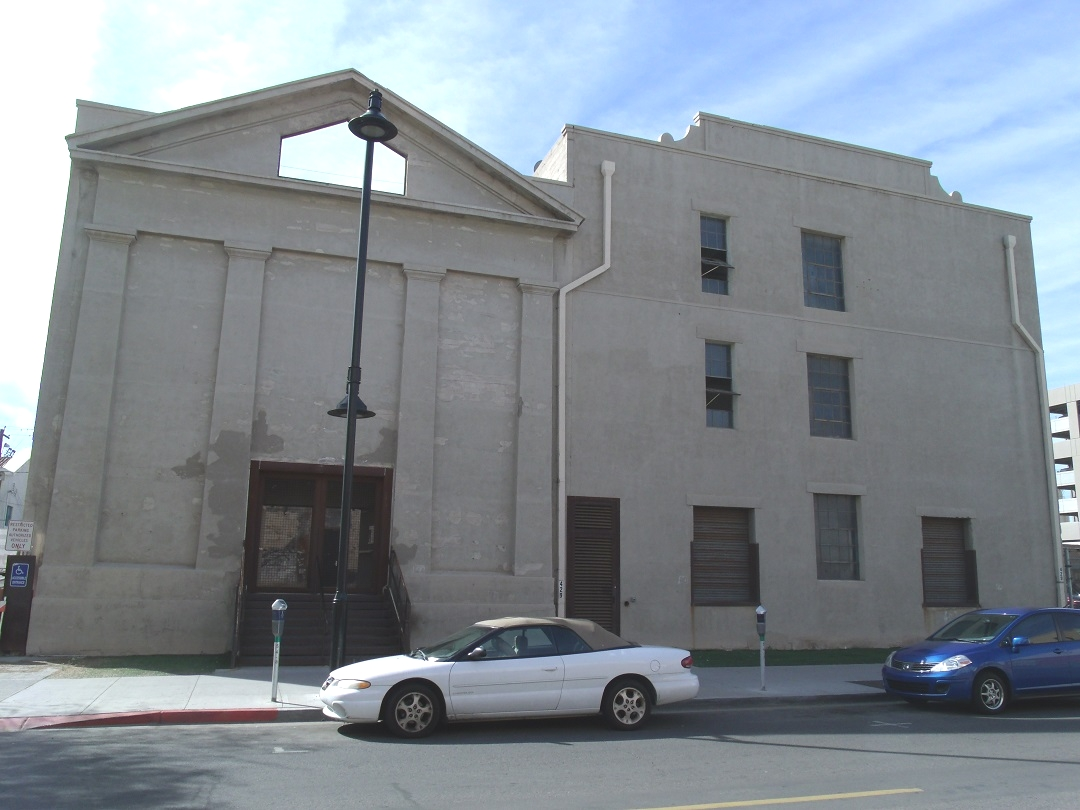
The Constable Ice and Fuel Co. building (now known as The Ice-house) was built in 1920 and is located at 429 W Jackson St. Before refrigeration ice was stored in this building. The Ice-house is located in the historic original townsite of the city of Phoenix. The building is now a cultural center devoted to promoting the Arts and humanitarian causes. Designated as a landmark with Historic Preservation-Landmark (HP-L) overlay zoning. The building was listed in the National Register of Historic Places September 4, 1985, reference: #85002074.

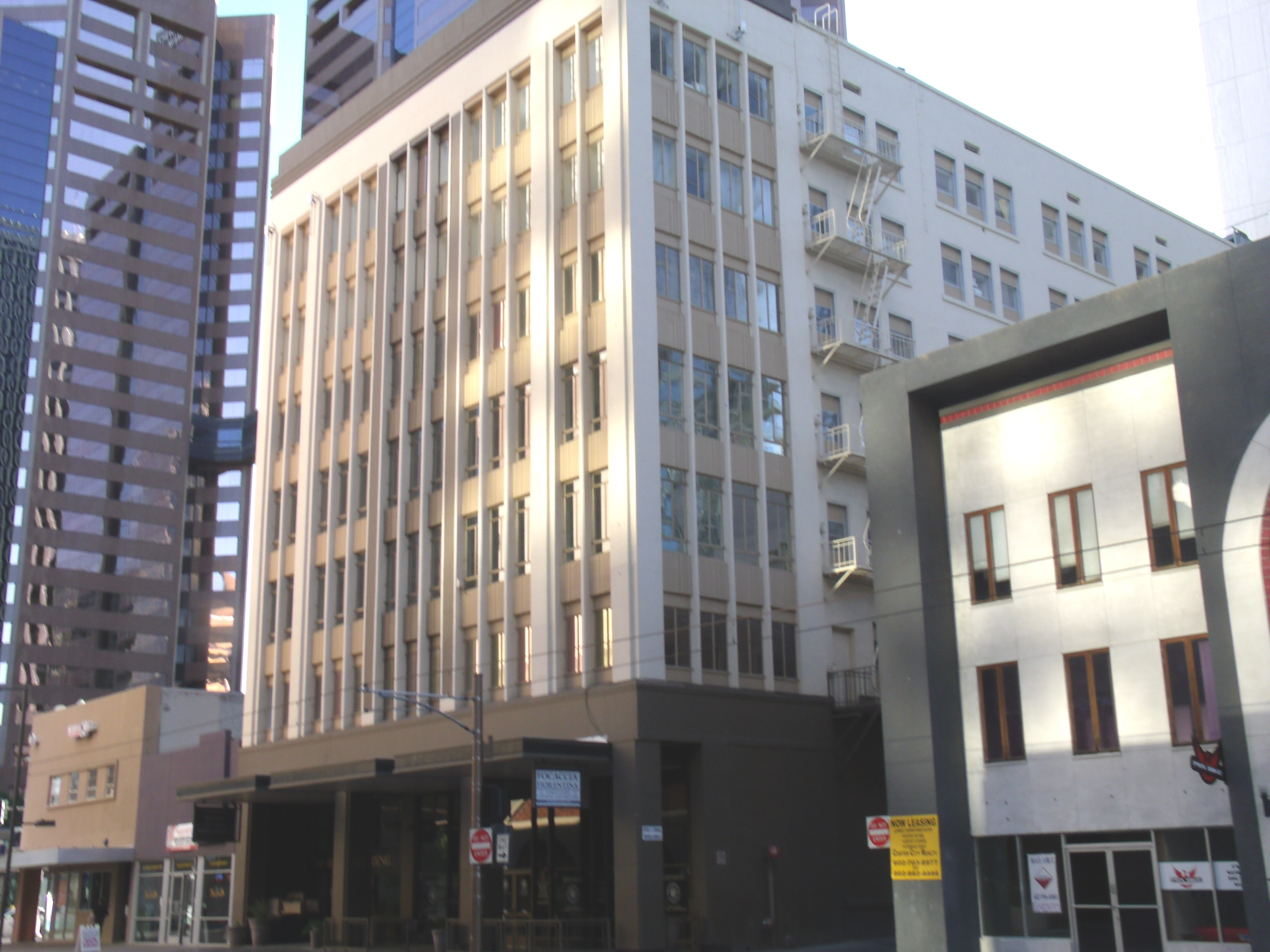
The Heard Building was built in 1920 and is located at 112 N. Central Avenue. It was Phoenix's first skyscraper. The building, which was listed in the National Register of Historic Places on September 4, 1985, reference: #85002059, was featured in Alfred Hitchcocks 1960 film "Psycho".

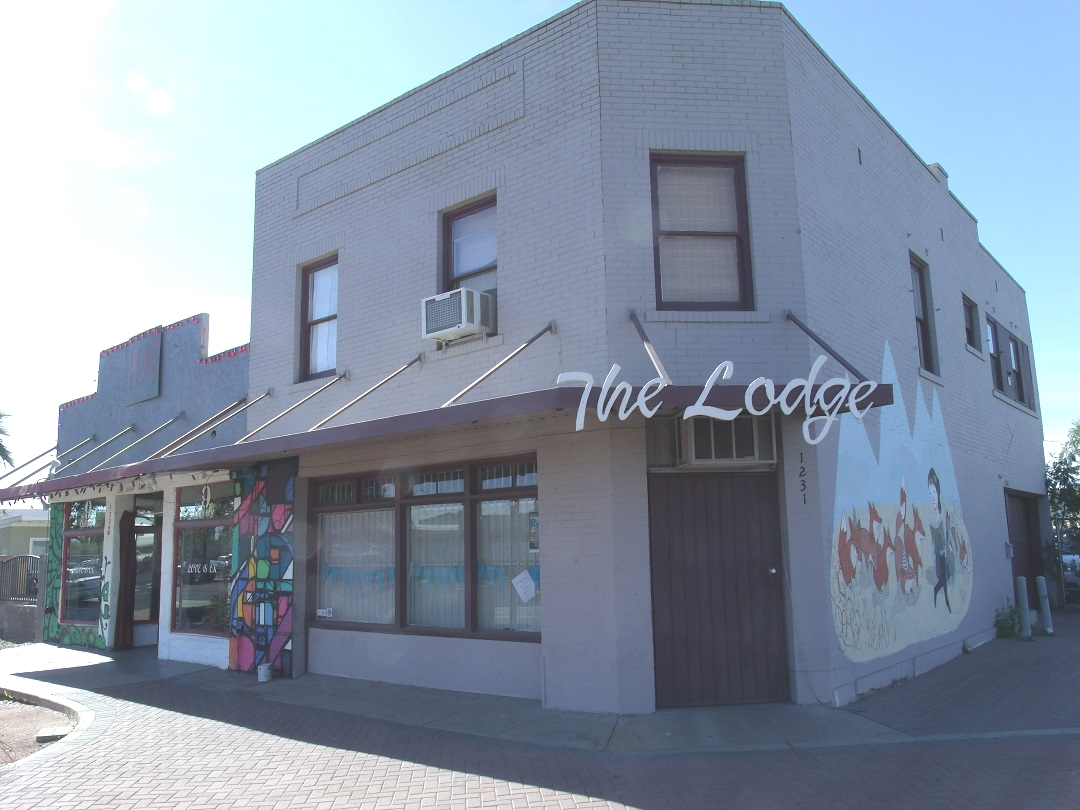
Rehbein Grocery built in 1920 and located in 1227-1231 Grand Avenue. Listed in the National Register of Historic Places, reference: #85002895

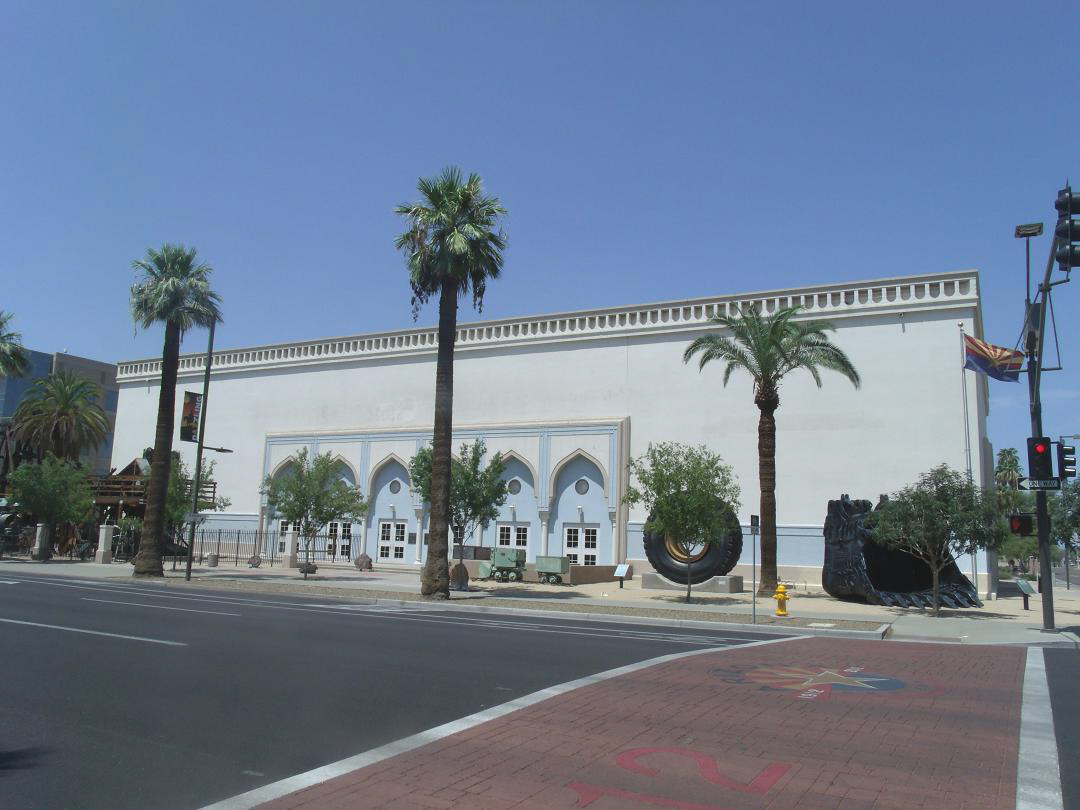
El Zaribah Shrine Auditorium. now the Polly Rosenbaum Building, was built in 1921 and is located at 1502 W. Washington St. Listed in the National register of Historic Places on March 9, 1989.

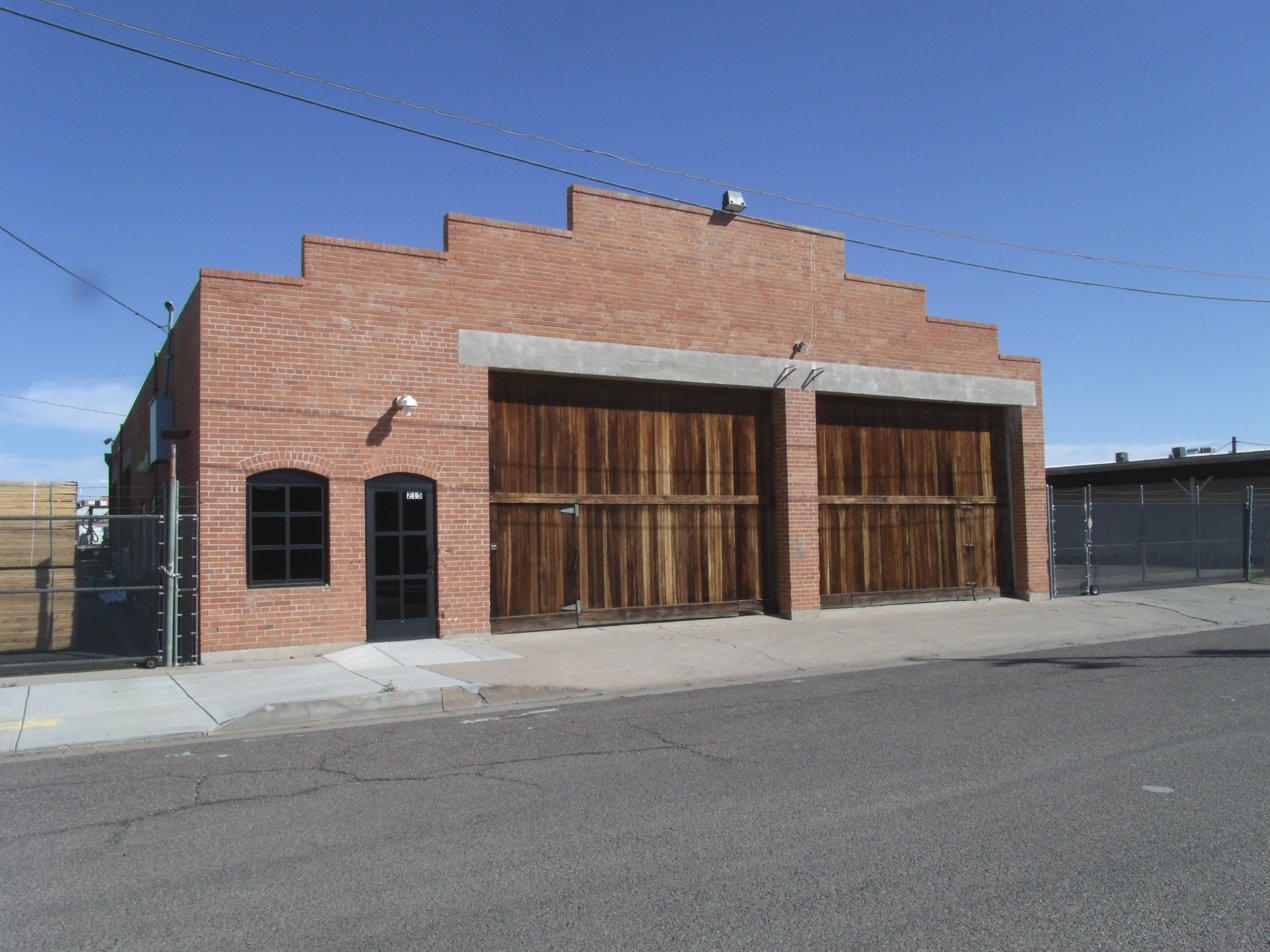
Arizona Compress and Warehouse Co. Warehouse built in 1922 and located at 215 S. 13th Street. On September 4, 1985, the property was listed in the National Register of Historic Places, reference: #85002044.

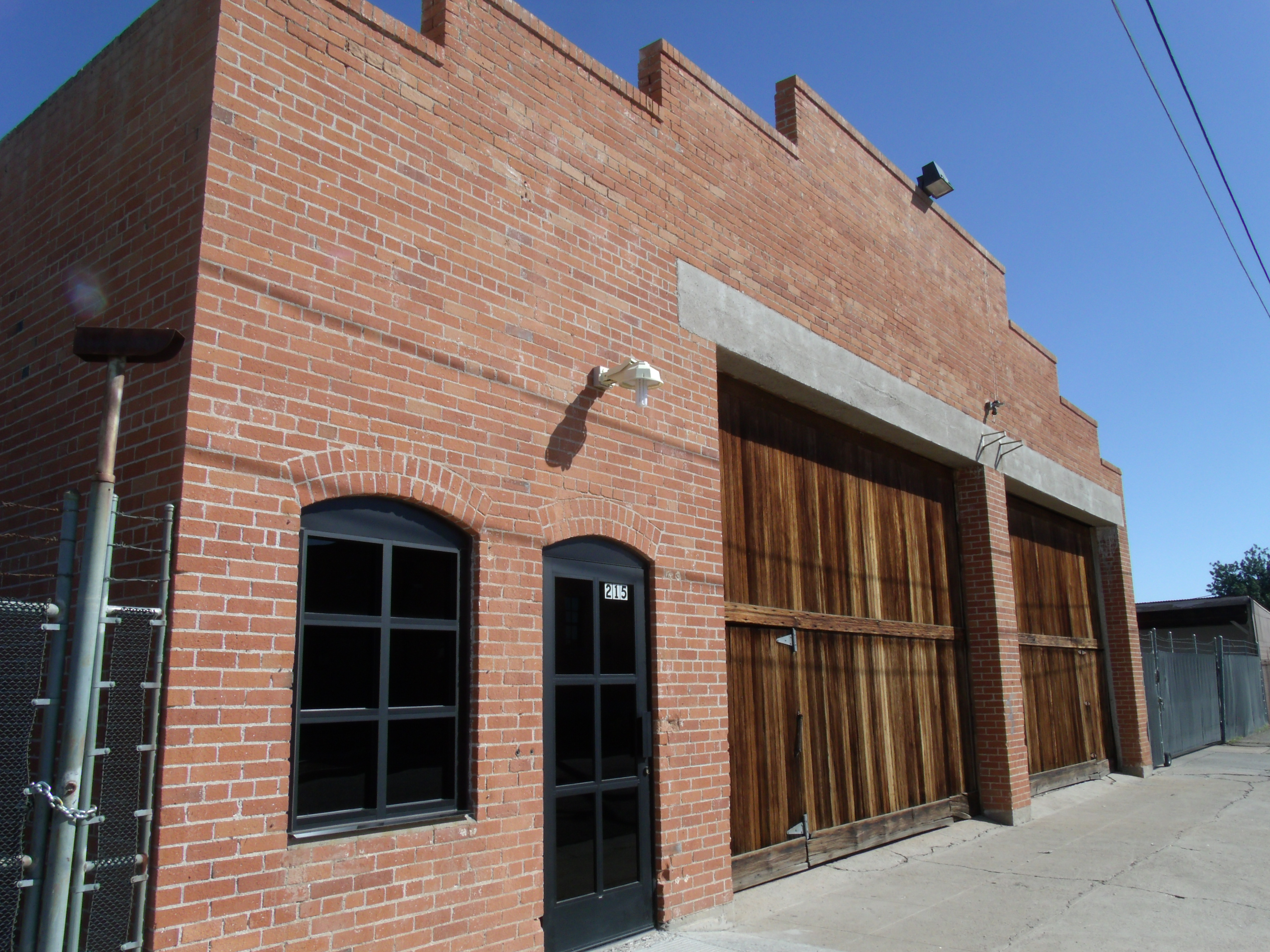
Different view of the Arizona Compress and Warehouse Co. Warehouse which was built in 1922 and is located at 215 S. 13th Street. On September 4, 1985, the property was listed in the National Register of Historic Places, reference: #85002044

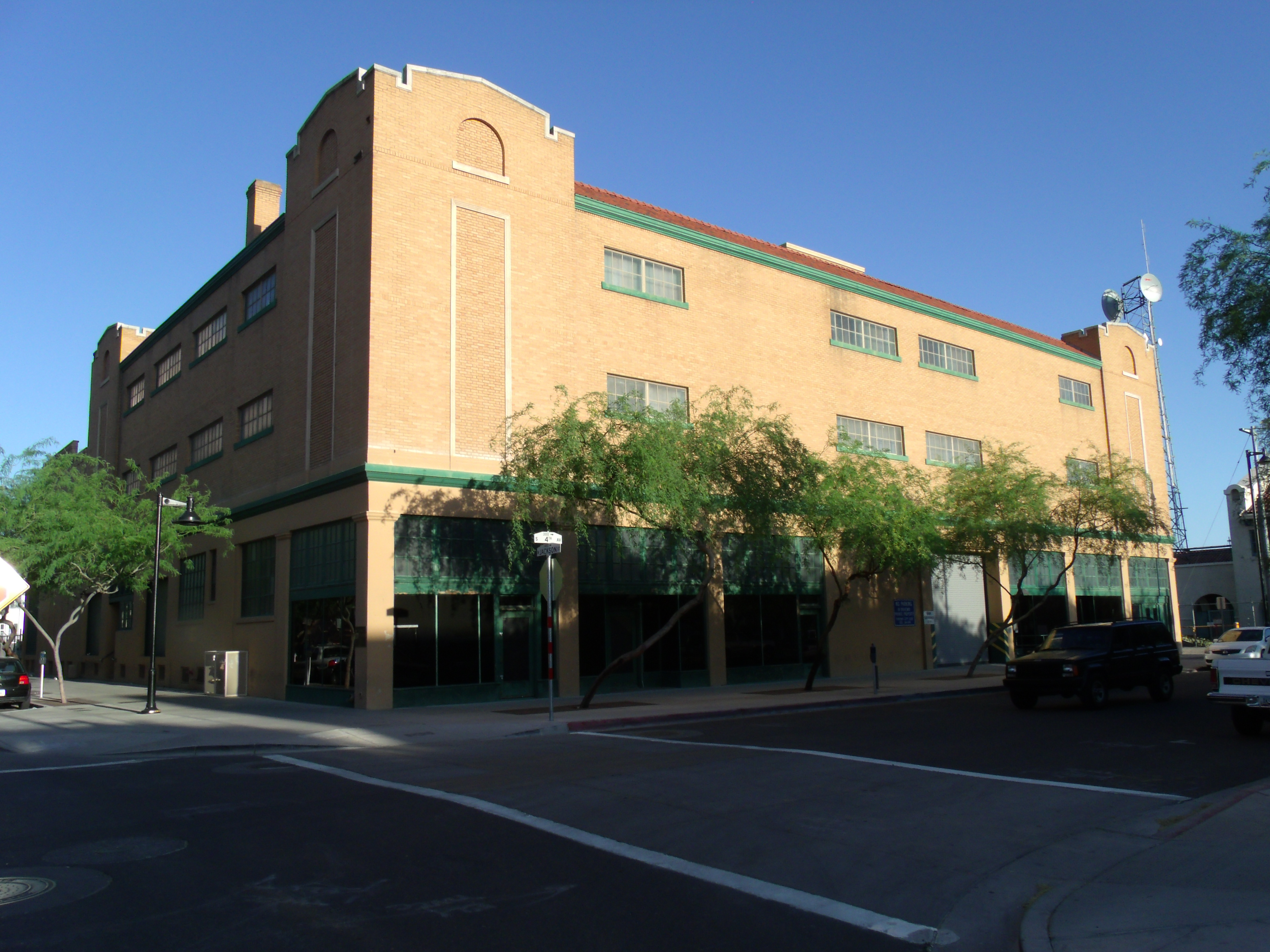
The Chambers Storage Building was built 1923 and is located at 309 S. 4th Avenue. It was listed in the National Register of Historic Places on September 4, 1985, reference: #85002052.

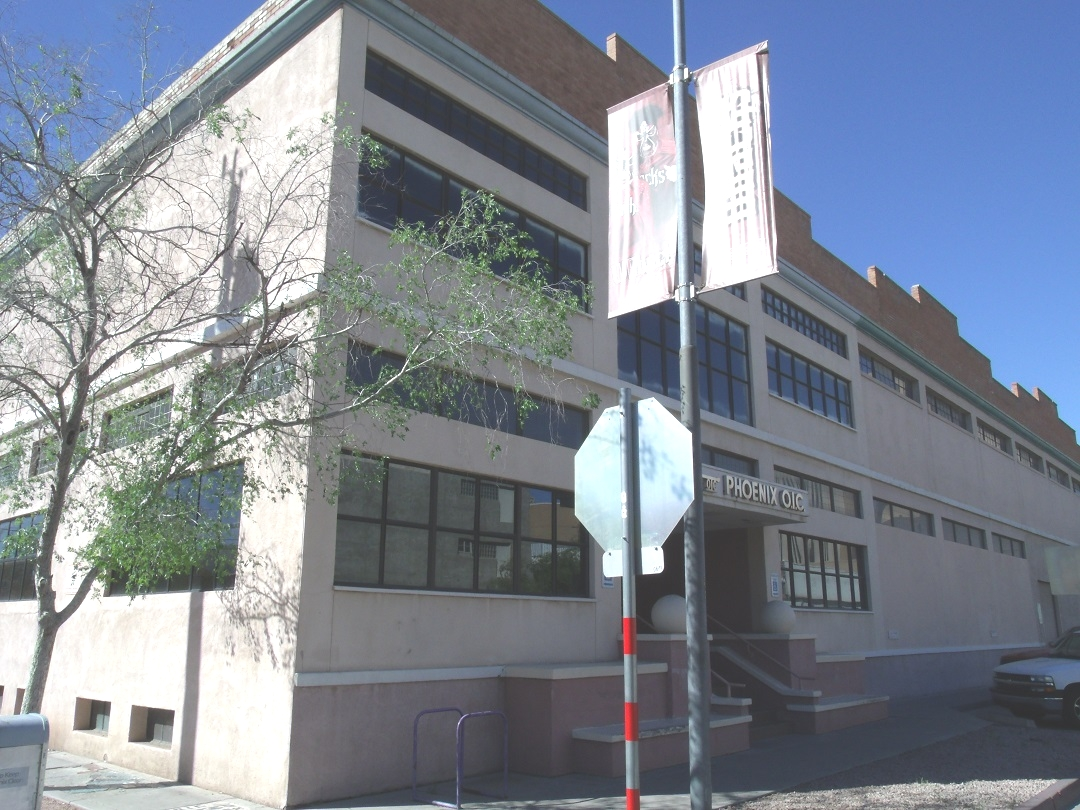
The Chambers Transfer and Storage Central Warehouse was built in 1923 and is located at15-39 E. Jackson St. It was listed in the National Register of Historic Places on September 4, 1985, reference: #85002051.

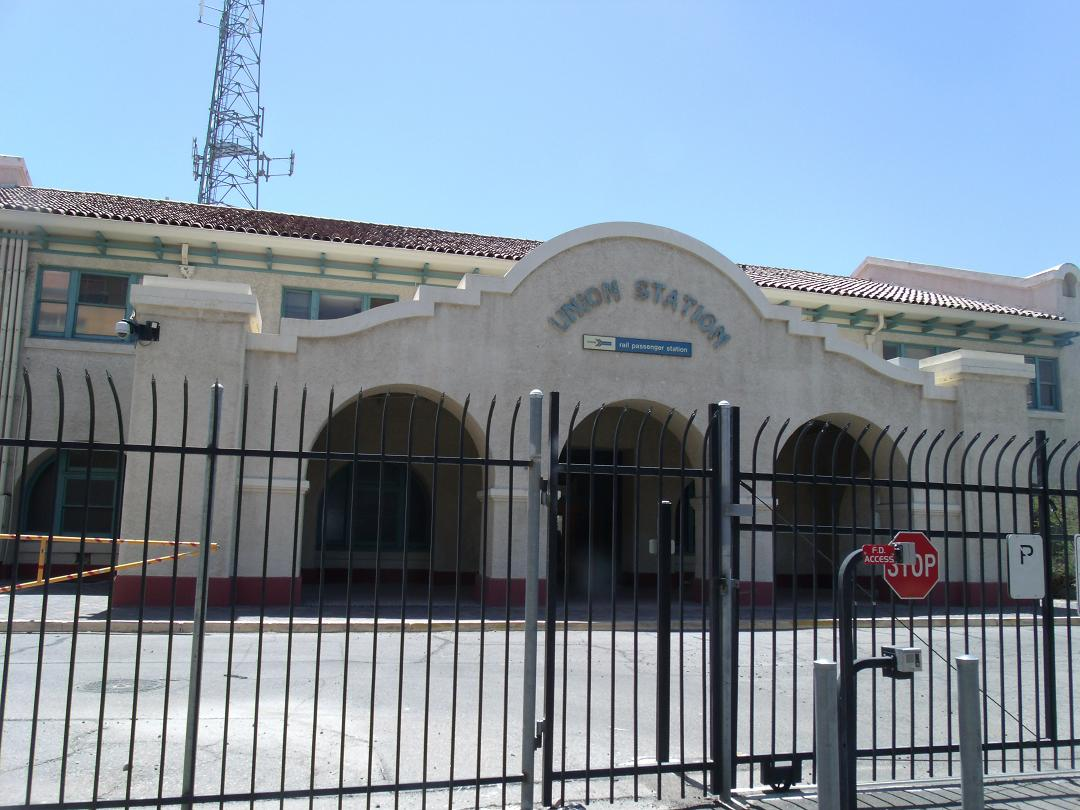
The Phoenix Union Station was built in 1923 and is located at Fourth Avenue and Southern Pacific RR tracks, Phoenix, Arizona. It was listed in the National Register of Historic Places in 1985, reference: #85003056

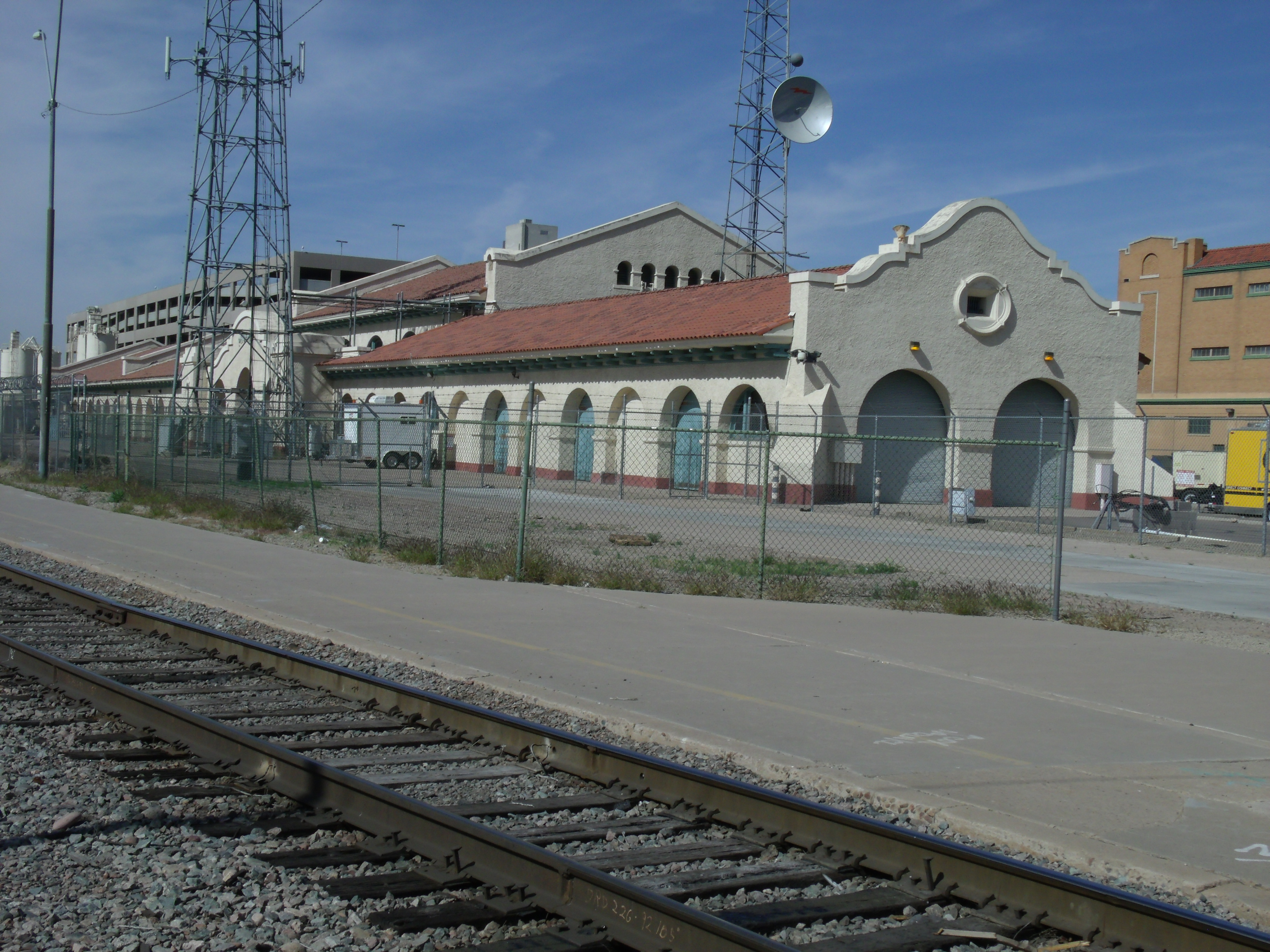
Different view of the historic Phoenix Union Station built in 1923 and located at 401 W. Harrison St. Listed in the National Register of Historic Places, reference number 85003056

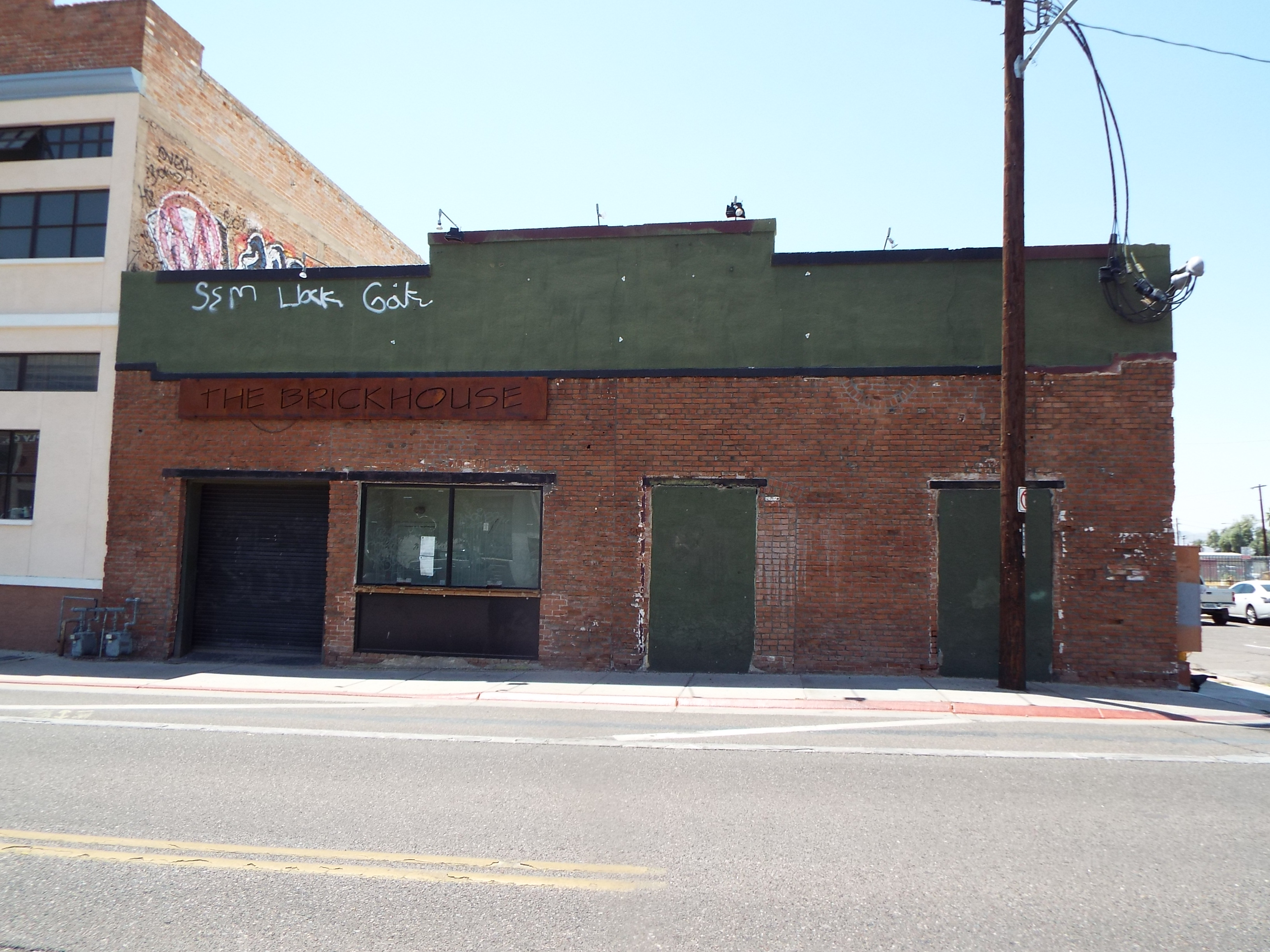
The Brickhouse Warehouse Building was built in 1924 and originally served as a warehouse. The structure is located at 1 East Jackson Street on the original town-site of Phoenix.

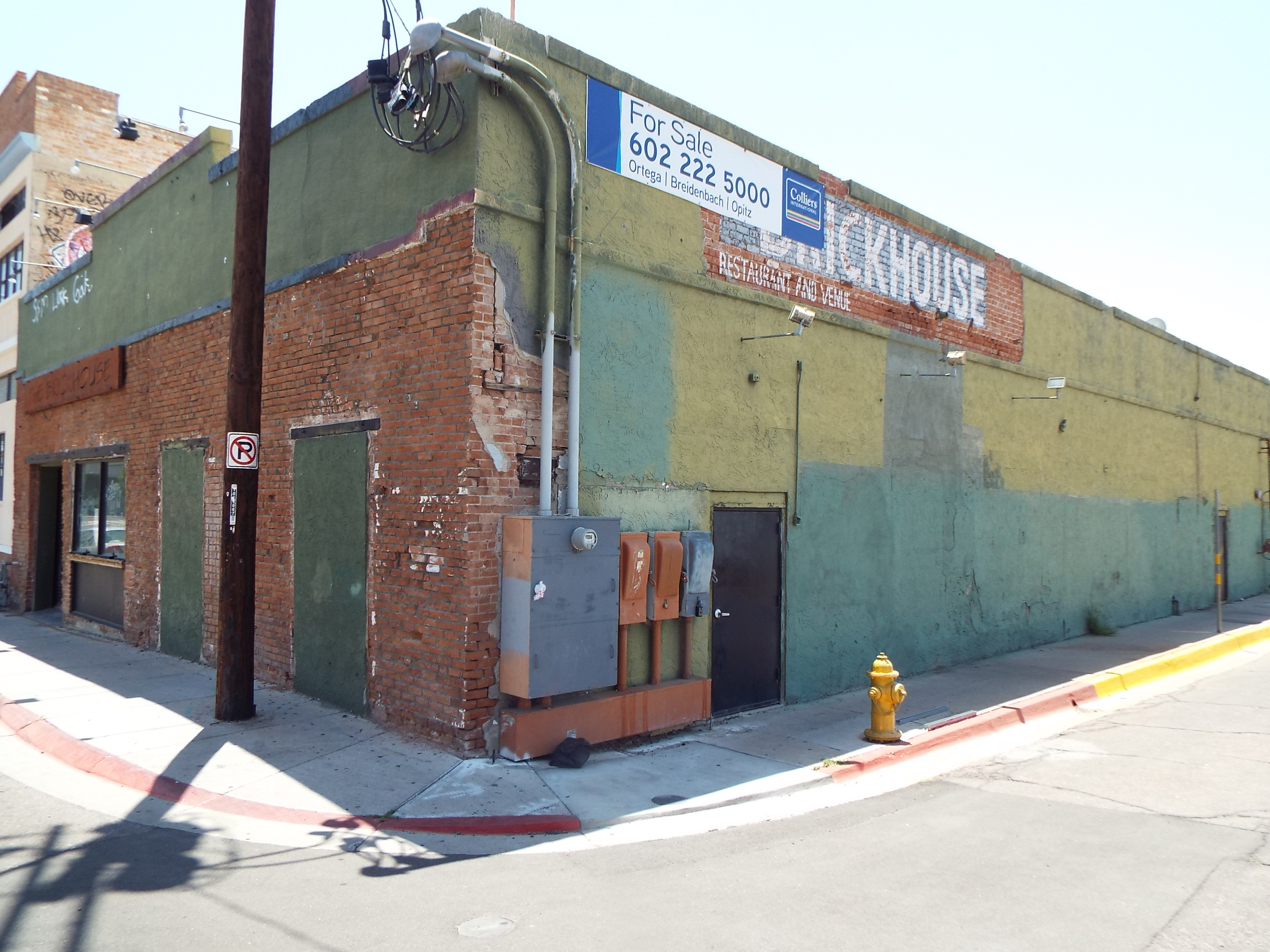
Different view of the Brickhouse Warehouse Building.

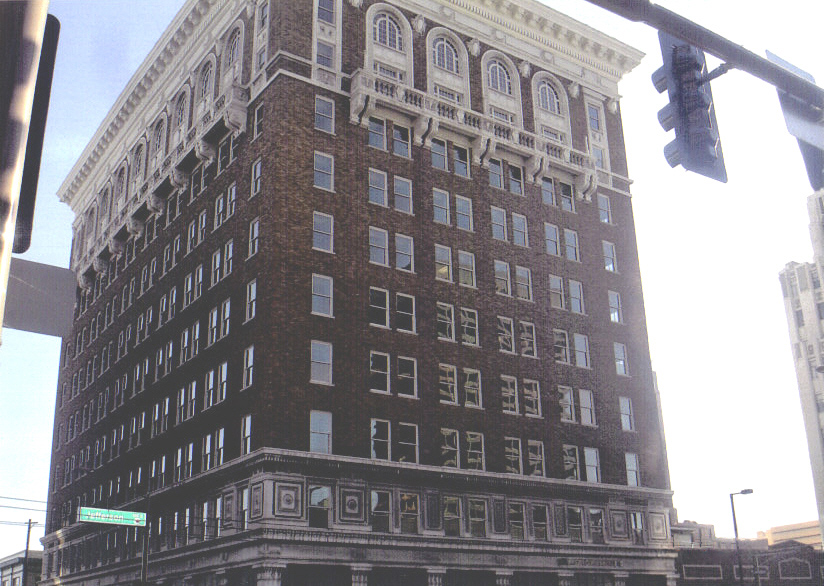
The Luhrs Building is an historic ten-story building built in 1924. It is located at 11 West Jefferson in downtown Phoenix. Listed in the National Register of Historic Places

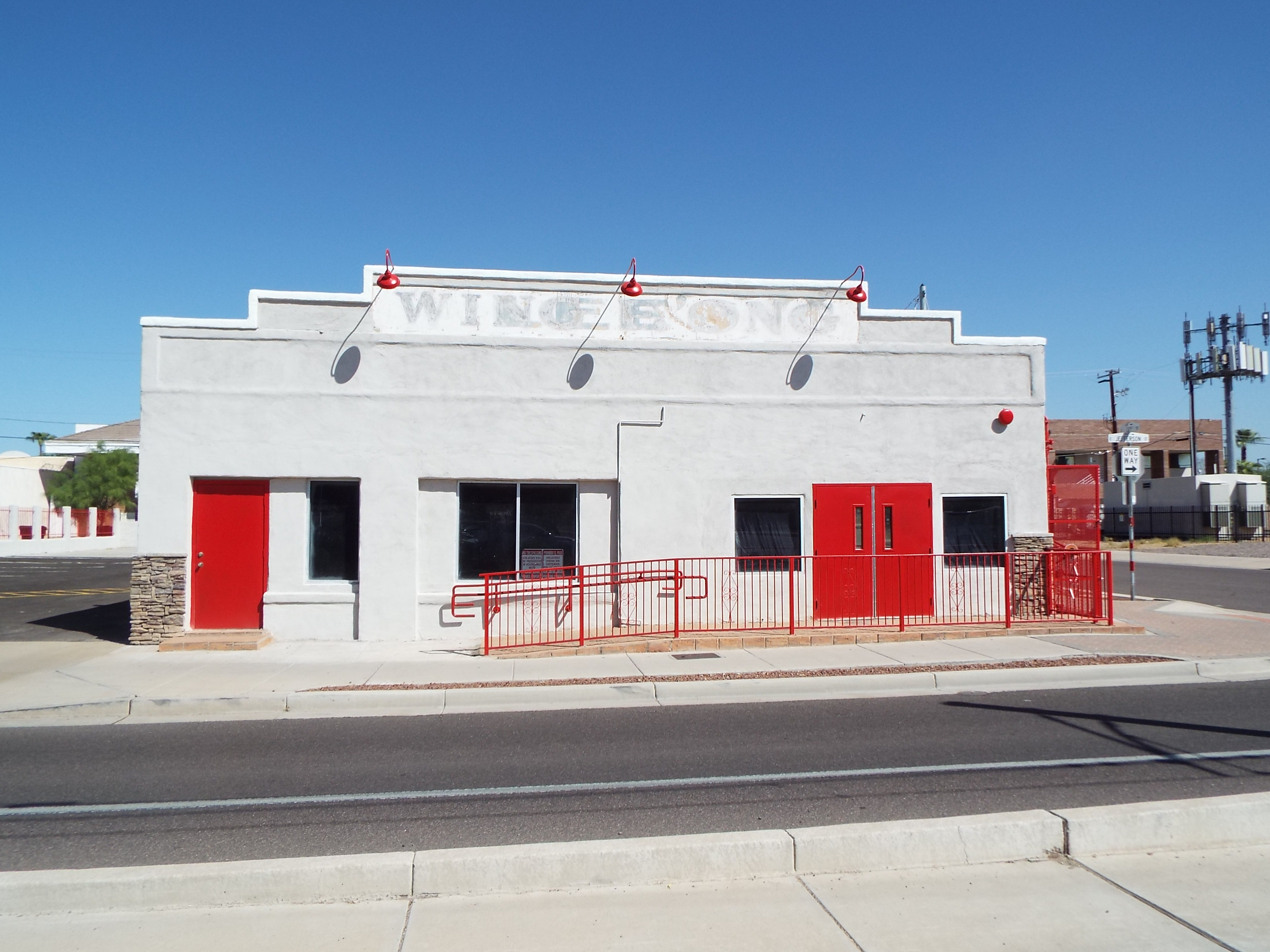
The Wing F. Ong Grocery Store located at 1246 E. Jefferson St. and built in 1925. Wing F. Ong ran for the state House of Representatives as a Democrat in 1946 and was elected, the first Chinese American in the country to achieve such status. Over the course of his career, he was elected twice to the state House and once to the state Senate.

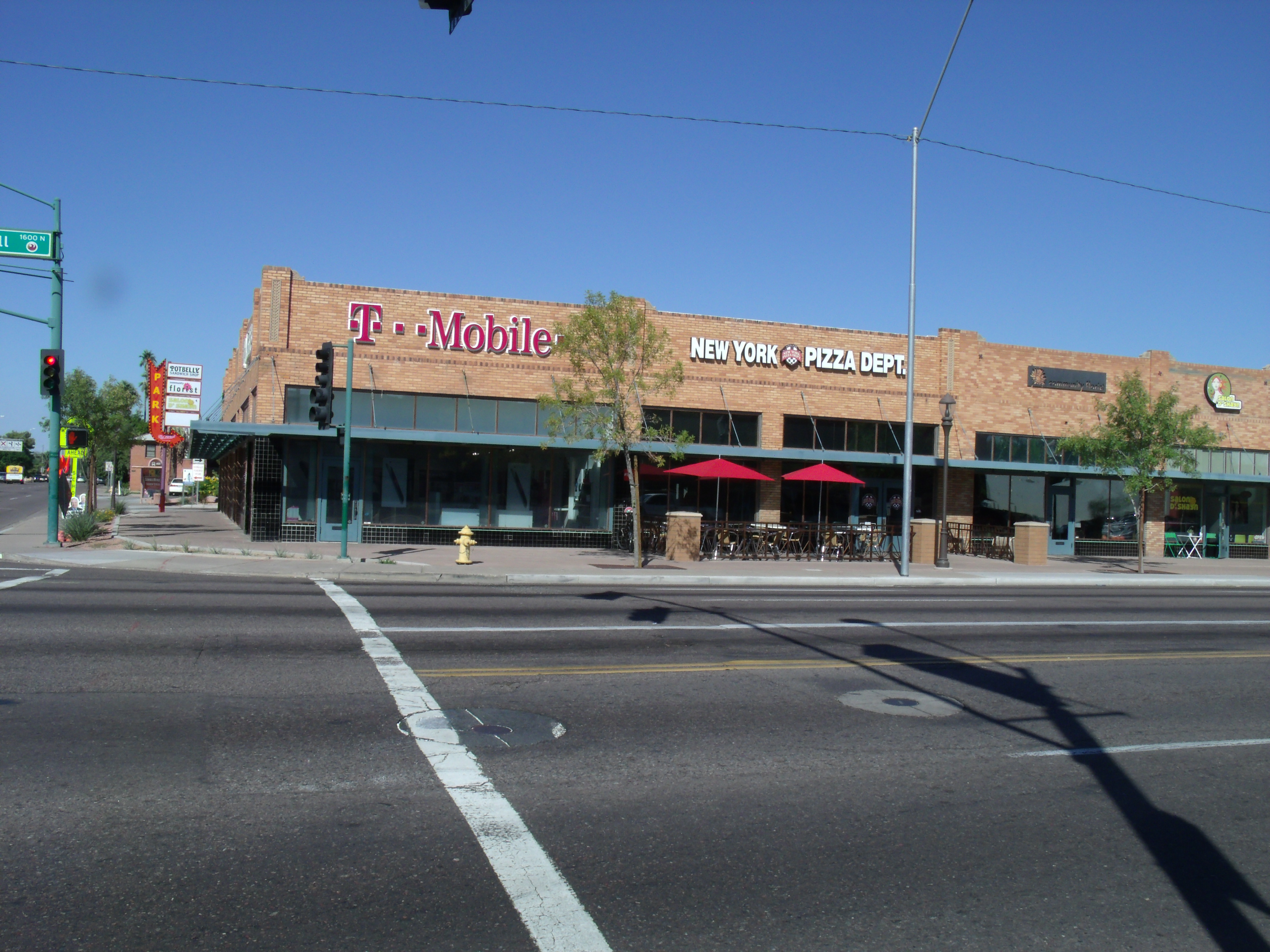
The Hurley Building was built in 1925 and is located at 536 and 544-548 W. McDowell and 1601 N. 7th Avenue. It was listed in the National Register of Historic Places on September 4, 1985, reference: #85002062

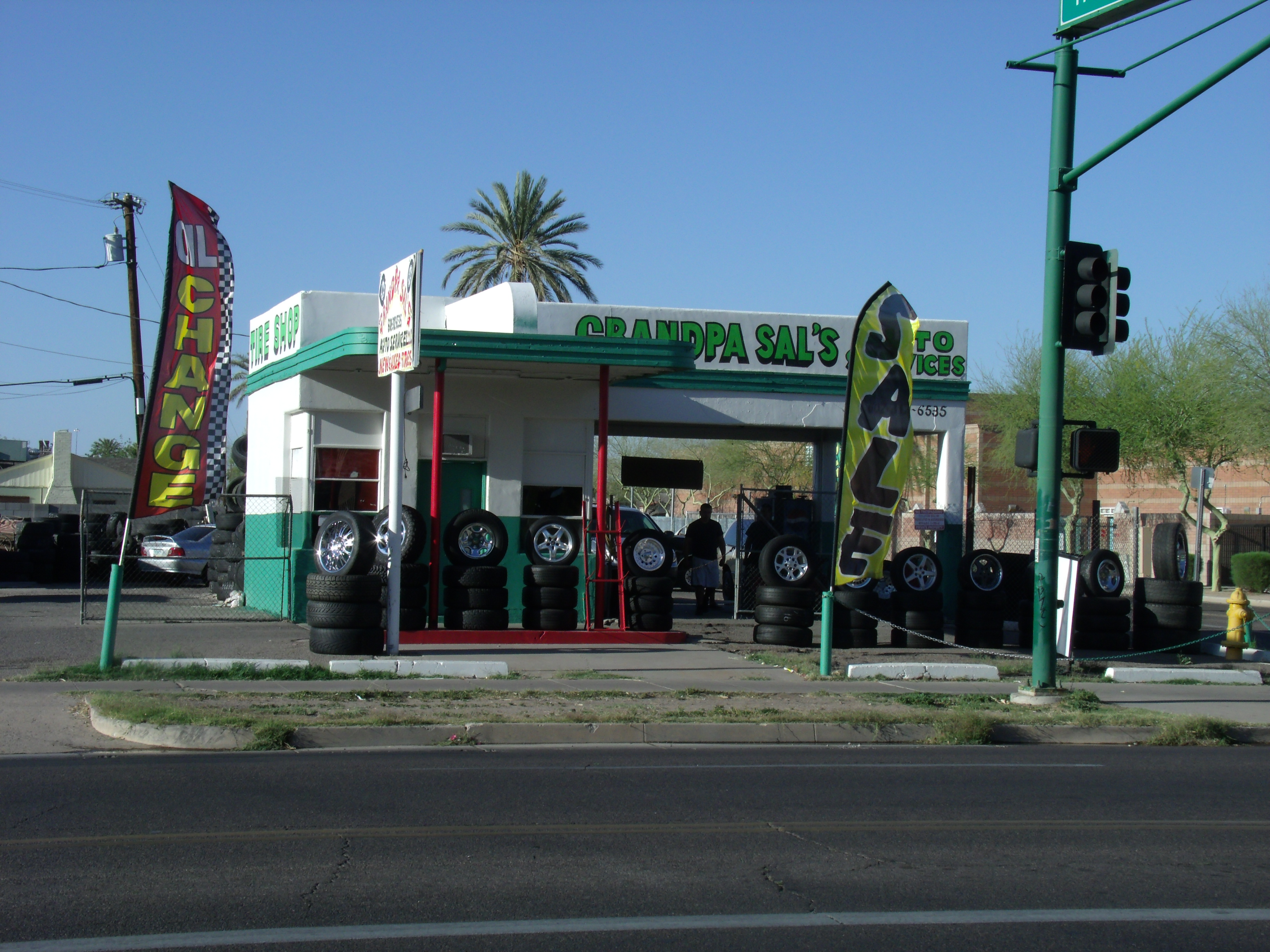
The Copeland & Trachet Service Station, now Granpa Sal's Tires, was built in 1925 and is located at 1702 W. Van Buren Rd. It was listed in the National Register of Historic Places on September 4, 1985, reference: #85002054.

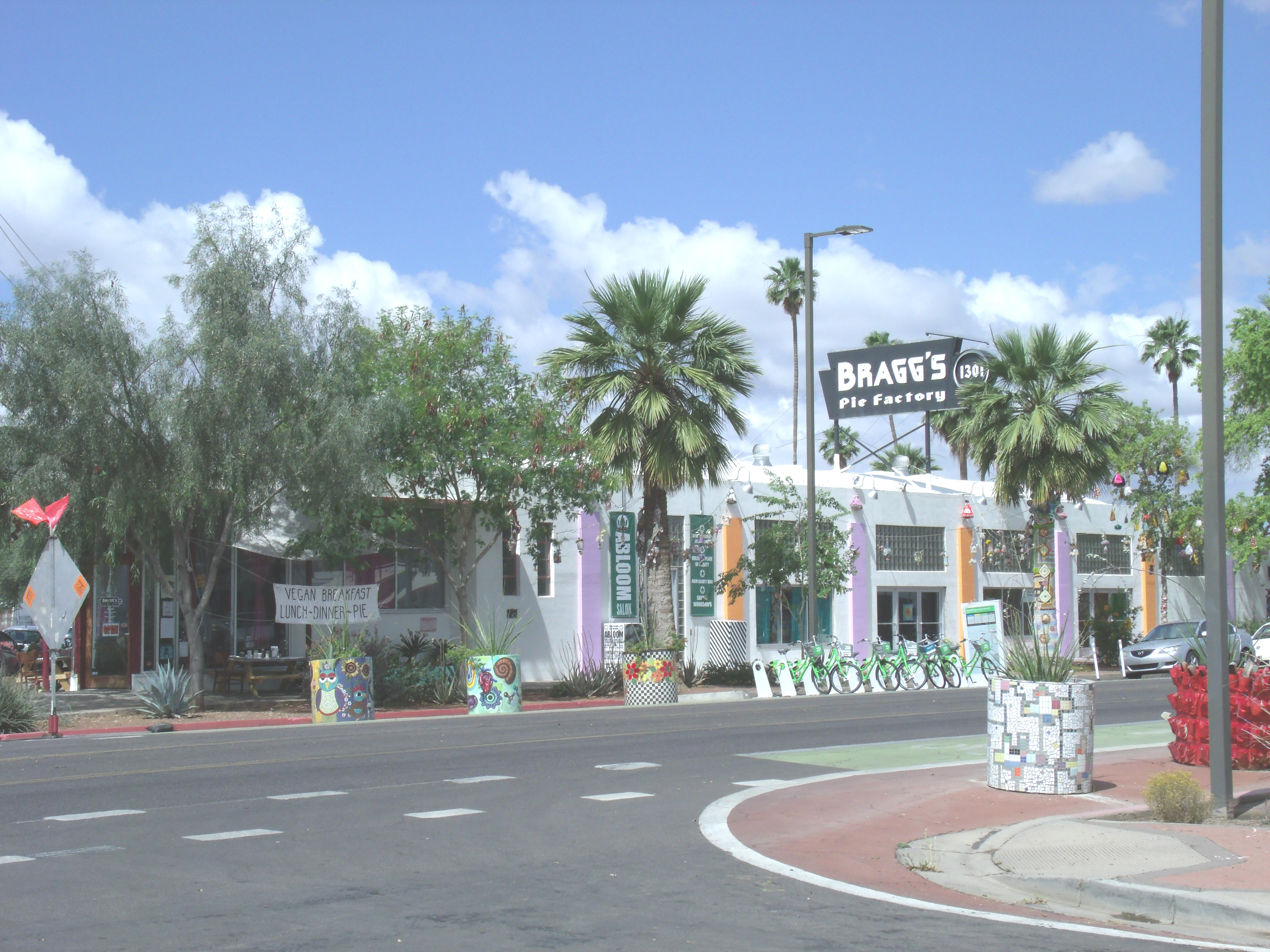
Bragg's Pie Building was built in 1925 and is located at located at 1301 Grand Avenue. The property was listed in the National Register of Historic Places on June 16, 2009.

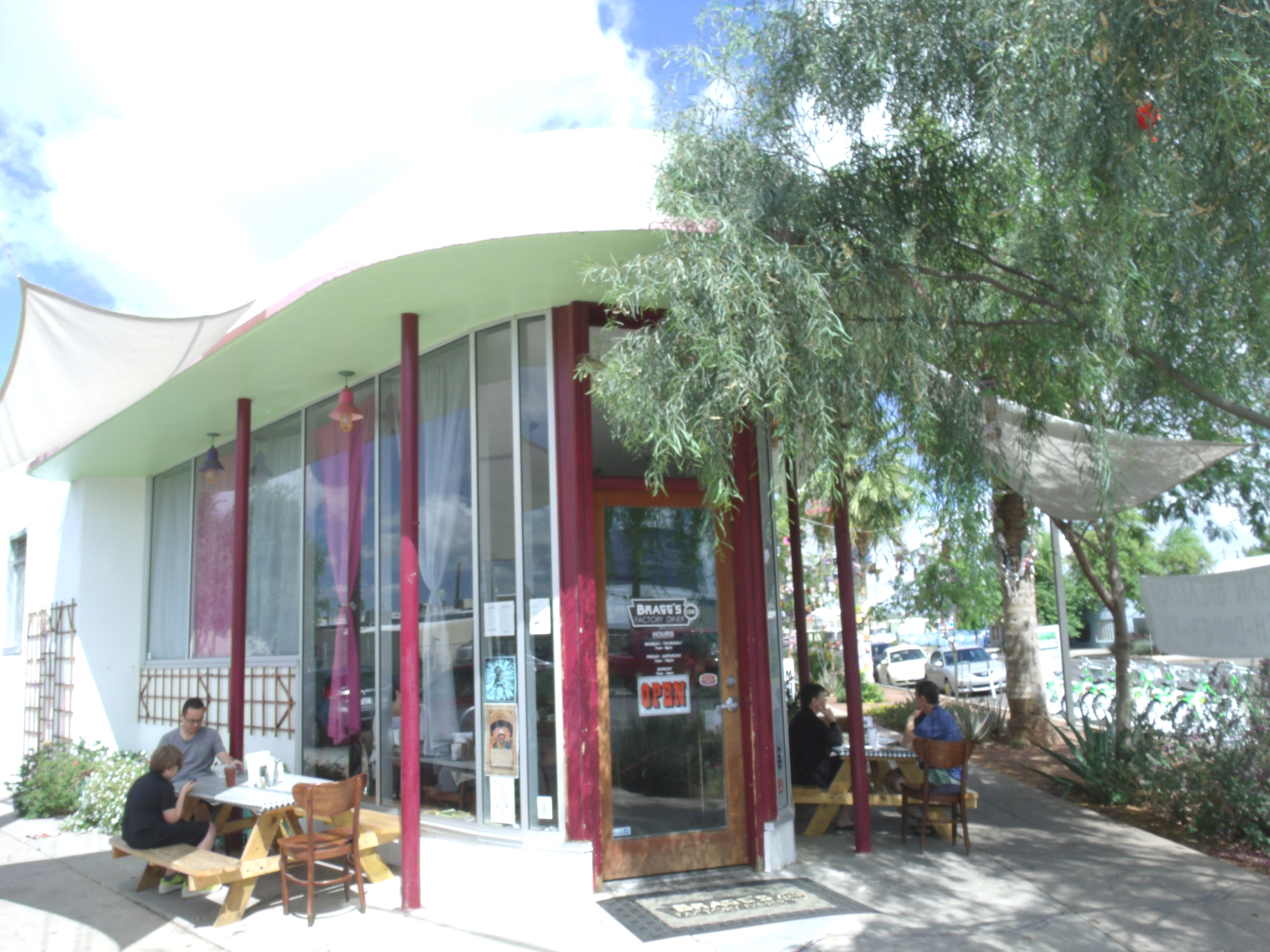
Front of Bragg's Pie Building.

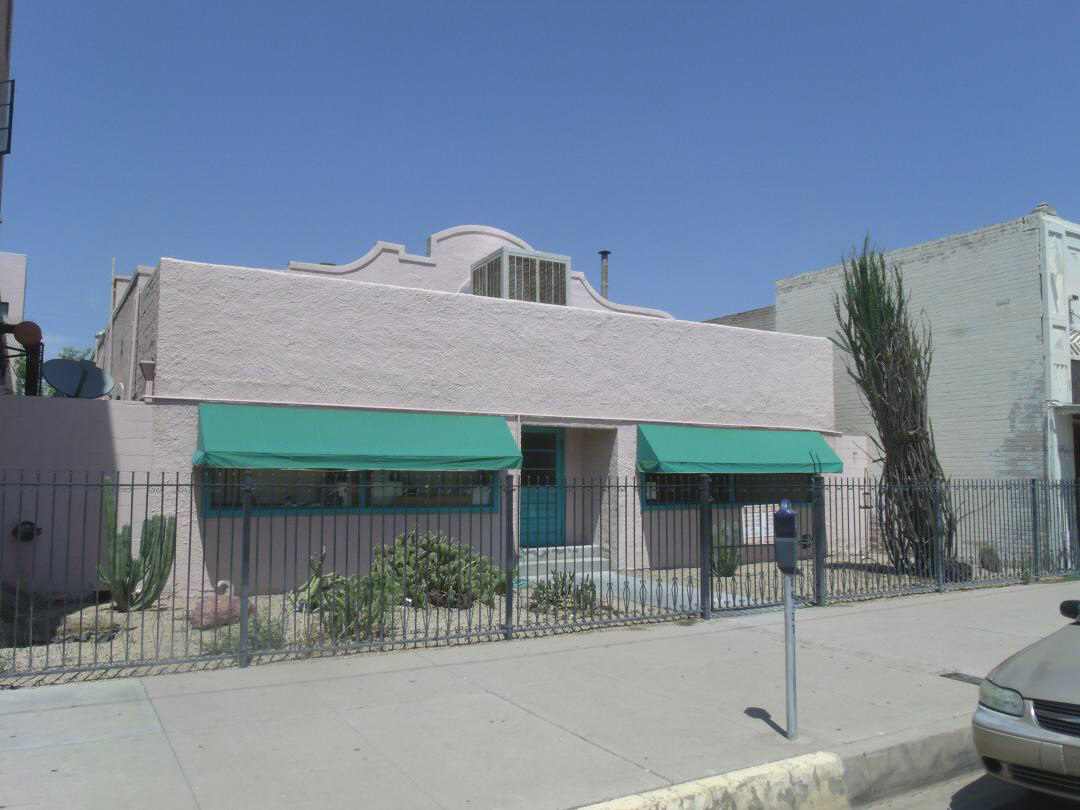
The Valley Plumbing and Sheet Metal Building was built in 1925 and is located at 530 W. Adams St. It was listed in the National Register of Historic Places on October 1, 1985, reference: #85002894.

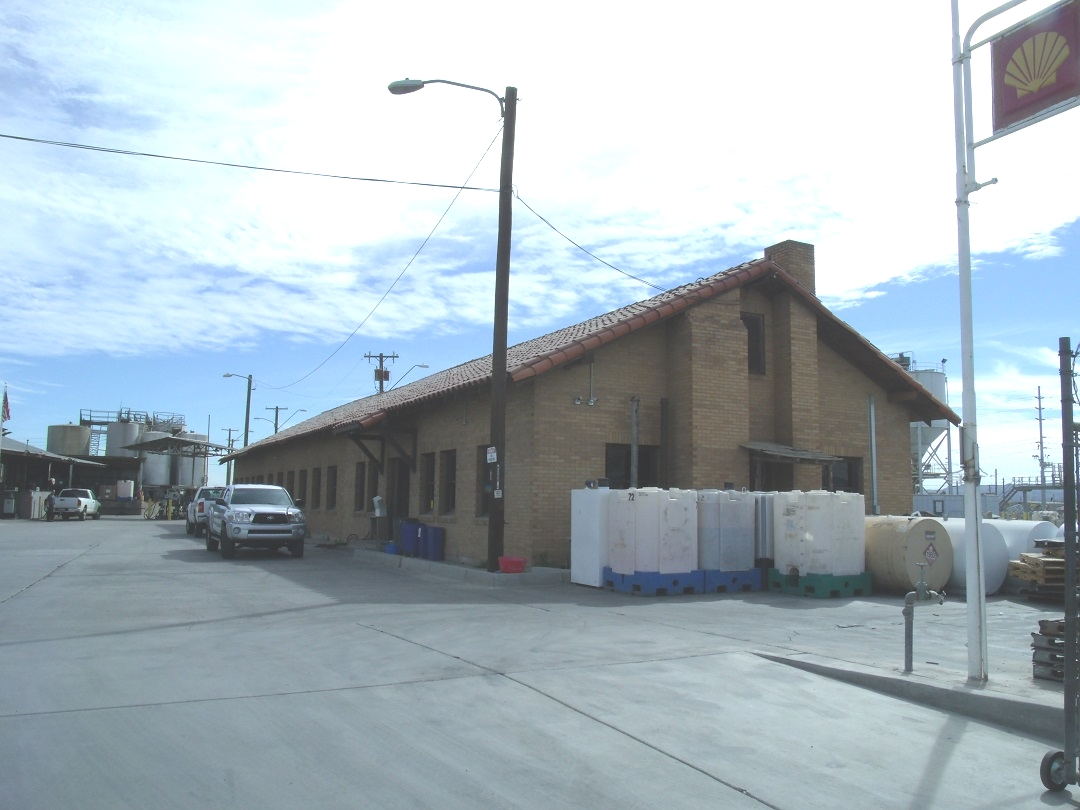
The Shell Oil Company Warehouse was built in 1925 and is located at 425 S. N. 16th Avenue. Listed in the National Register of Historic Places, reference: #85002073.

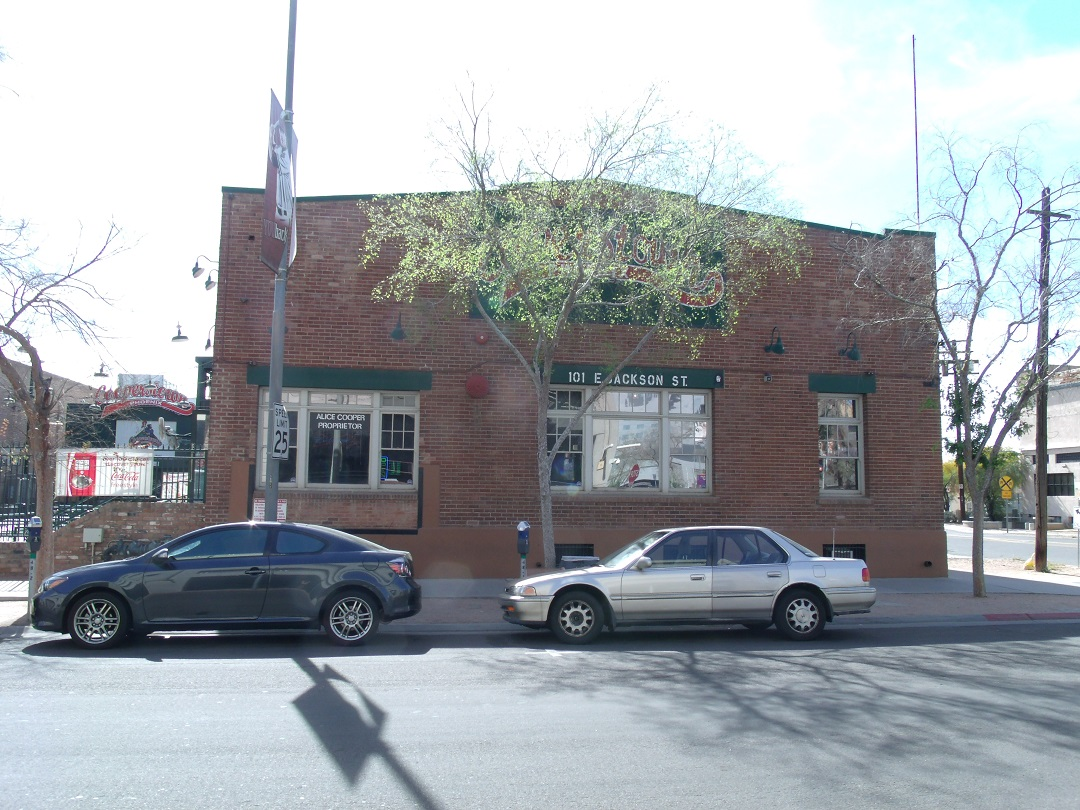
Western Wholesale Drug Company Warehouse built in 1925 and located at 101 E. Jackson St. The structure is owned by rock legend Alice Cooper and now houses the Alice Cooperstown Restaurant. Designated as a landmark with Historic Preservation-Landmark (HP-L) overlay zoning (PHPR).

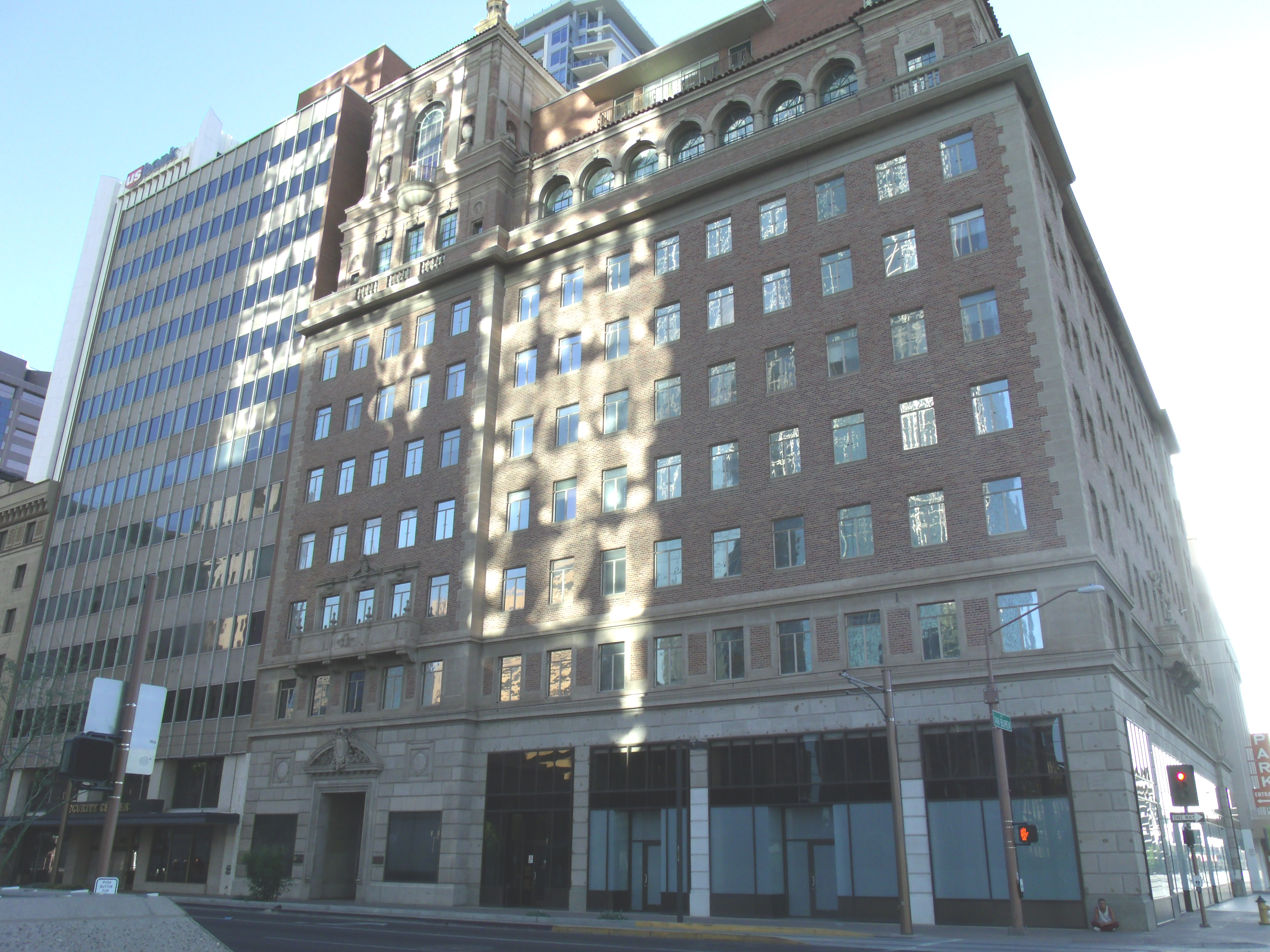
The Security Building was built in 1925 and is located at 234 North Central Avenue. The property is listed in the National Register of Historic Places.

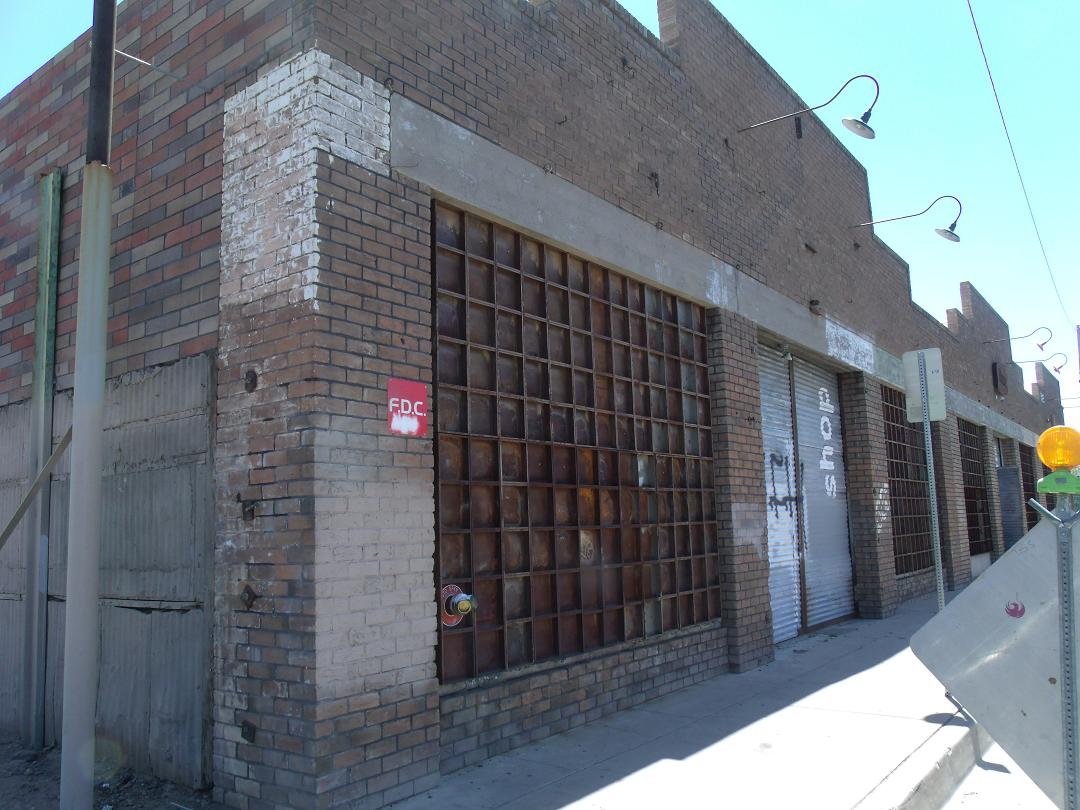
The Anchor Manufacturing Co., also known as 41-3, was built in 1925. It is located at 525 (525-551) S. Central Avenue. The building was listed in the National Register of Historic Places in 1985, reference: #85002042.

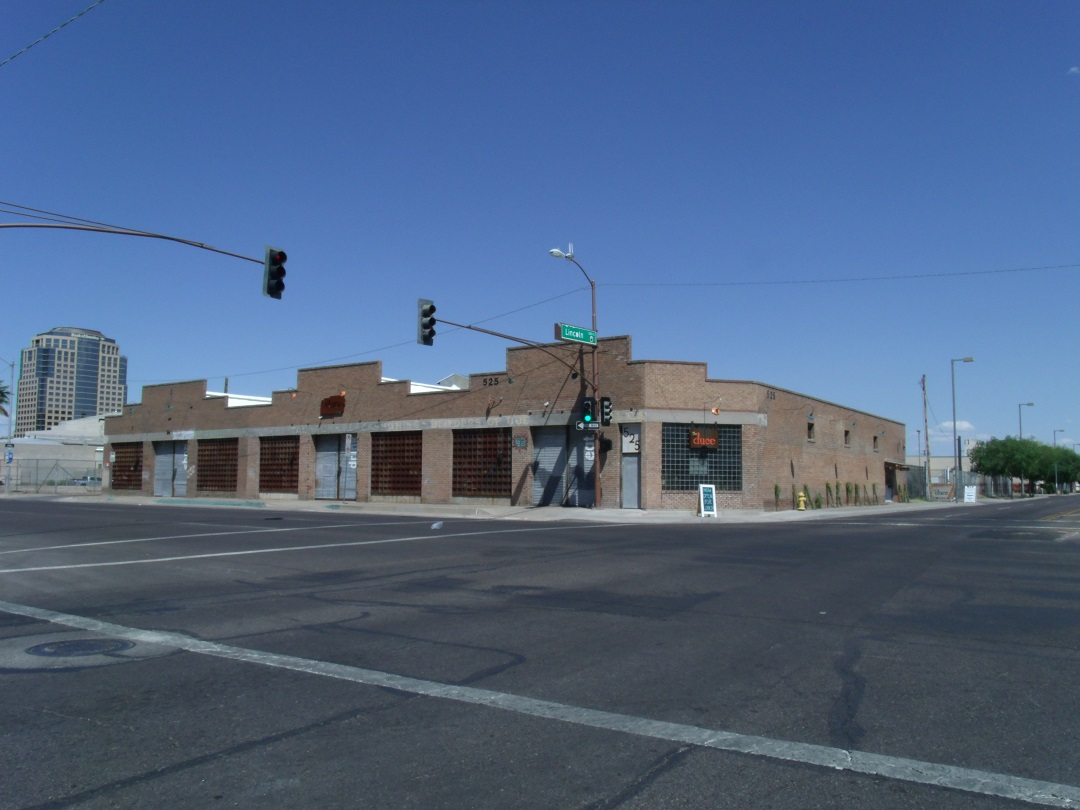
Different view of the Anchor Manufacturing Co.

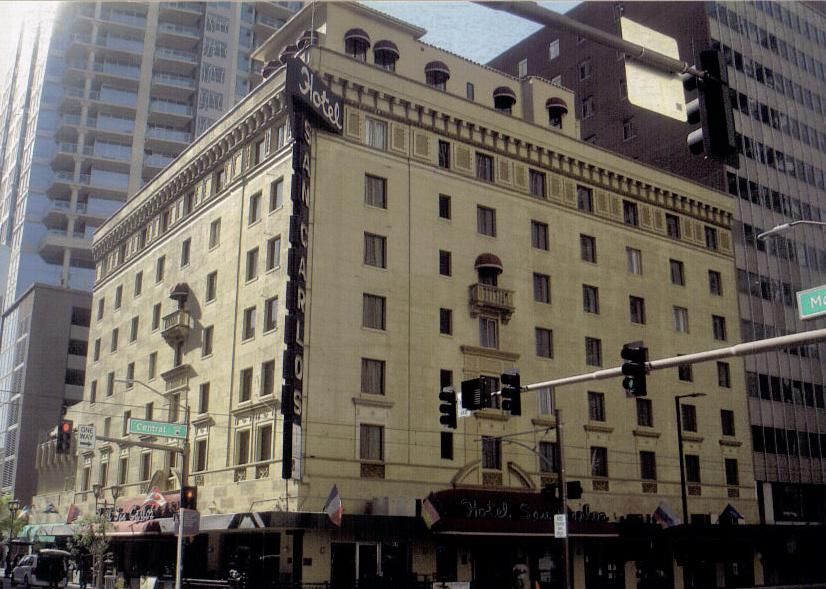
The San Carlos Hotel, also known as Hotel San Carlos, was built in 1925 and is located at 202 N. Central Avenue. Mae West, Clark Gable, Carole Lombard, Marilyn Monroe and Gene Autry are among the celebrities who at one time stayed at the San Carlos. The hotel was listed in the National Register of Historic Places in 1983. Reference number 83003498.

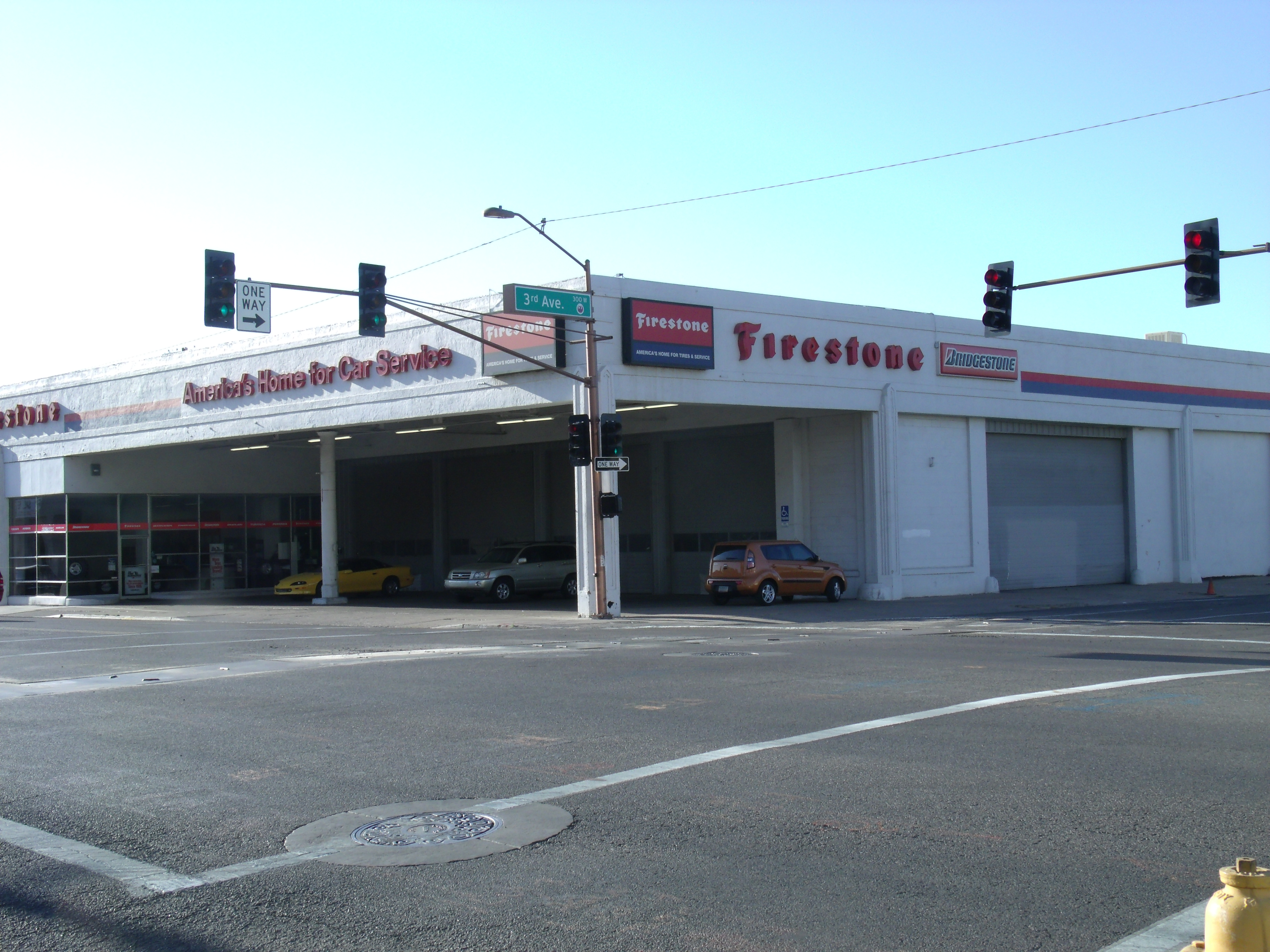
The Firestone building built in 1925 and located at 302 W. Van Buren Avenue. The property was listed in the National Register of Historic Places on October 1, 1985, reference: #85002891.

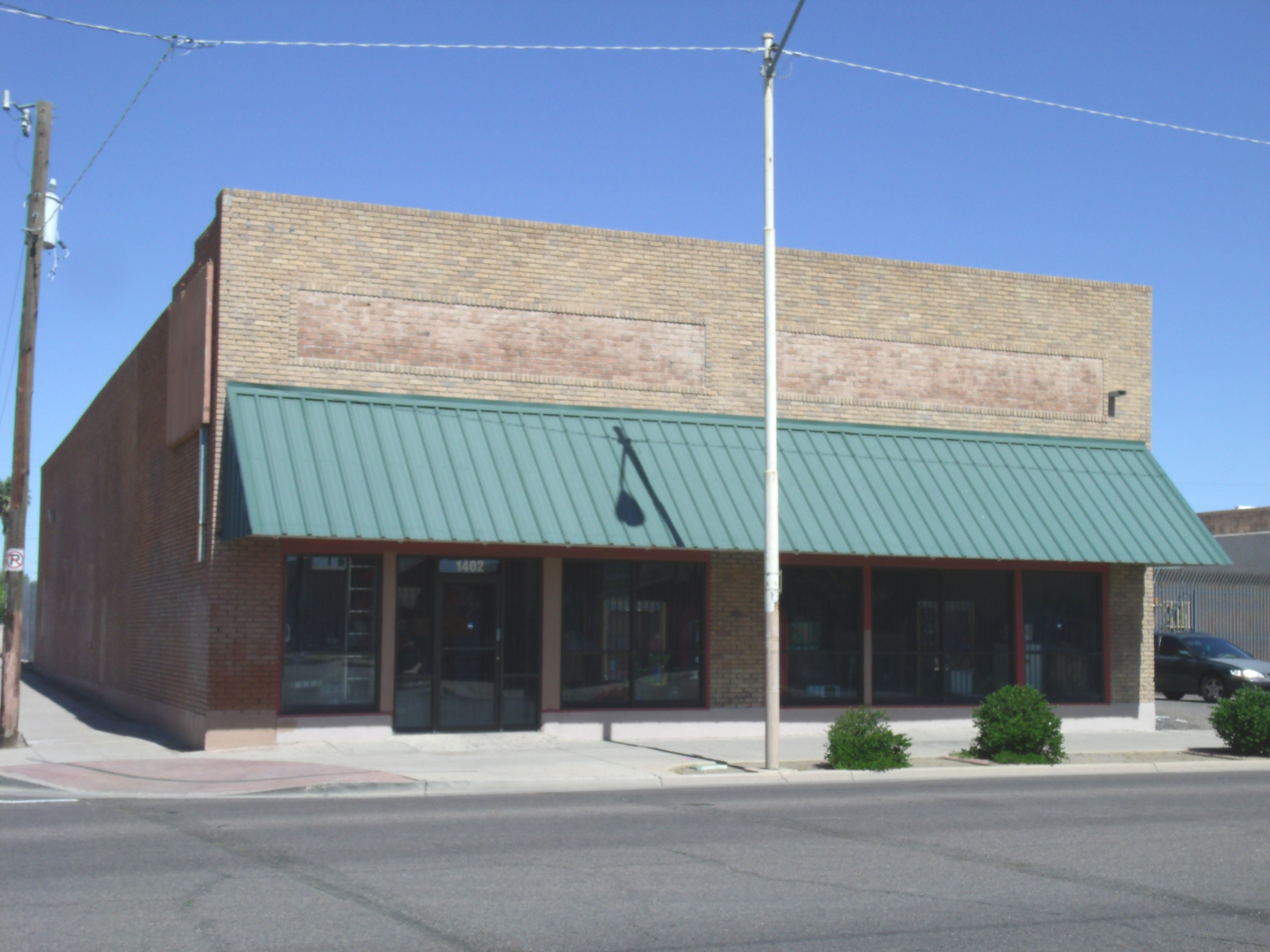
The Pay n Takit #13 was built in 1925 and located at 1402 E. Van Buren Rd. It was listed in the National Register of Historic Places in 1985, reference: #85002068.

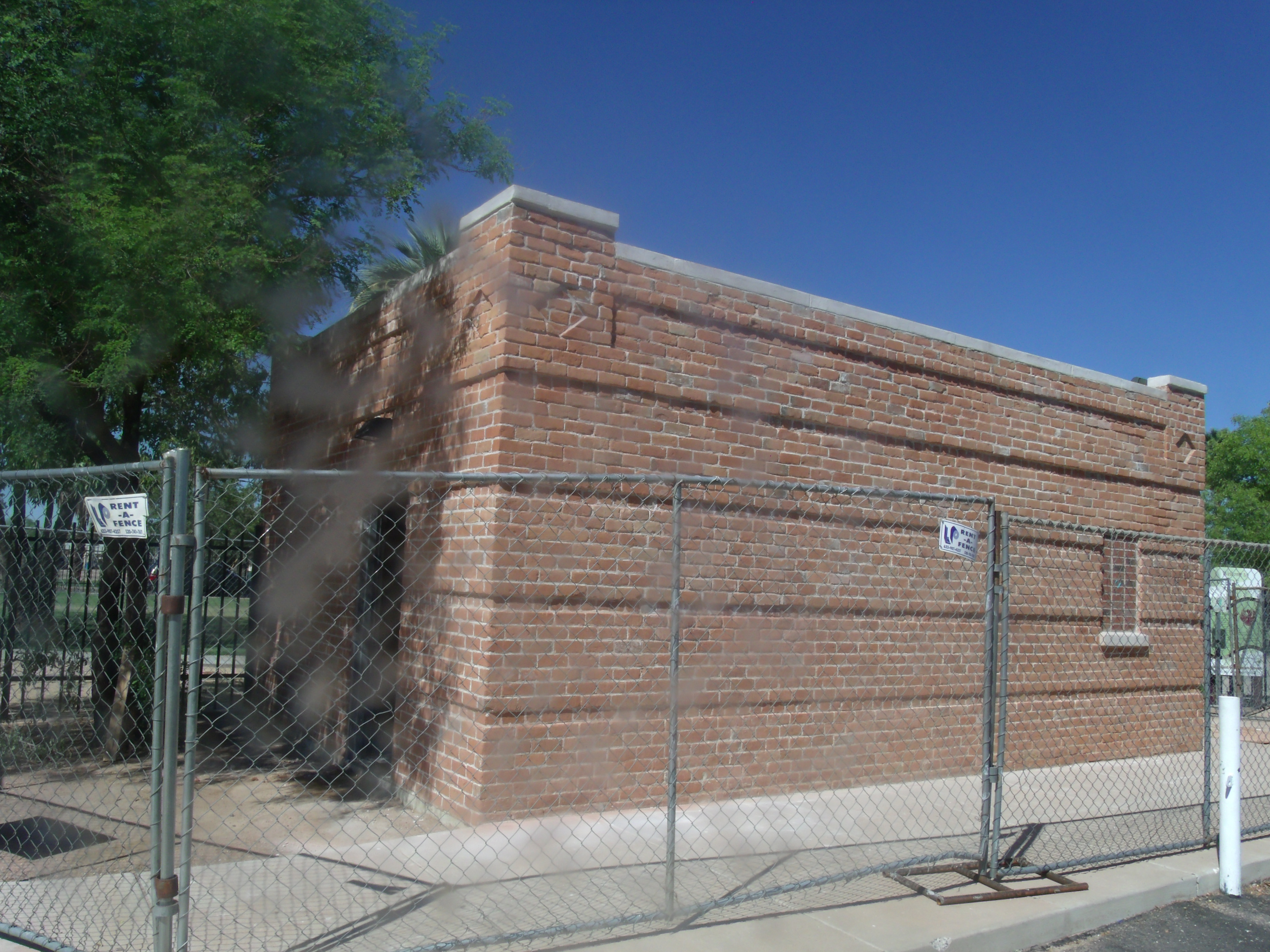
The Verde Park Pumphouse was built in 1925 and is located at Junction of 9th St. and Van Buren Avenue. It was listed in the National Register of Historic Places on September 7, 1995 reference #95001078. Area of Significance: Community Planning And Development; Period of Significance: 1925-1949.

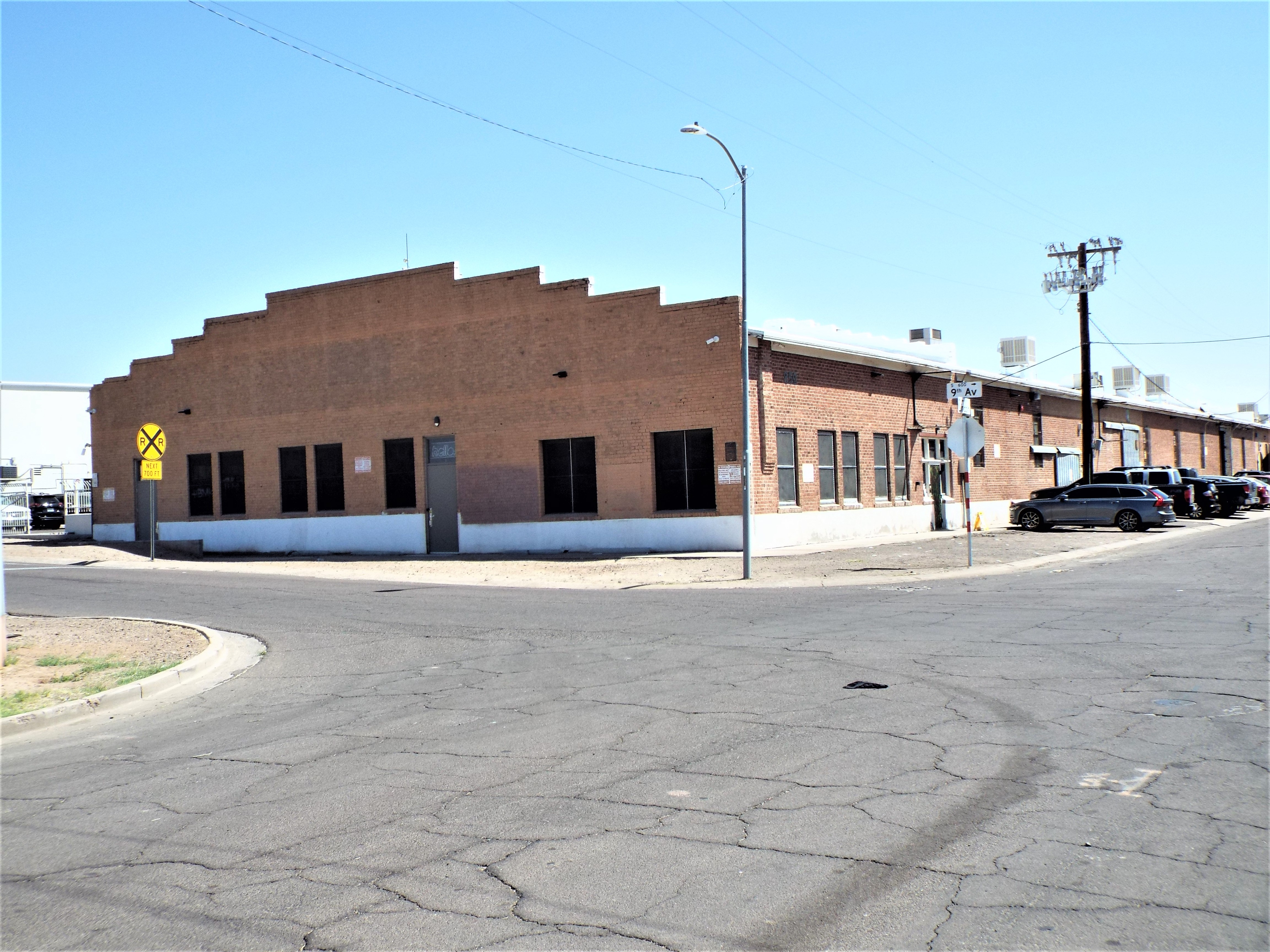
The Arizona Sash, Door & Glass Company Warehouse was built in 1926 and is located on 850 W. Lincoln St. It was listed in the Phoenix Historic Property Register in February 2020.

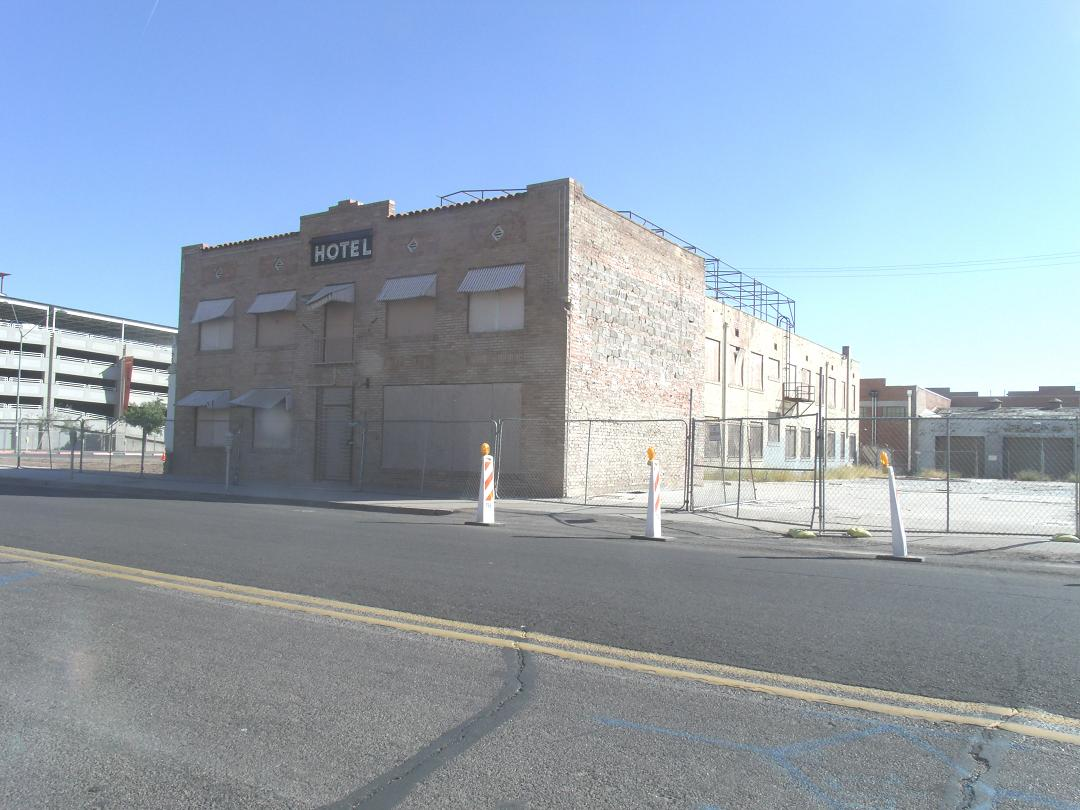
Hotel St. James. The now abandoned structure was built in 1925 and listed in the National Register of Historic Places, reference: #85002061 on September 4, 1985. The building which was located in 21 E. Madison St. was demolished in 2012.

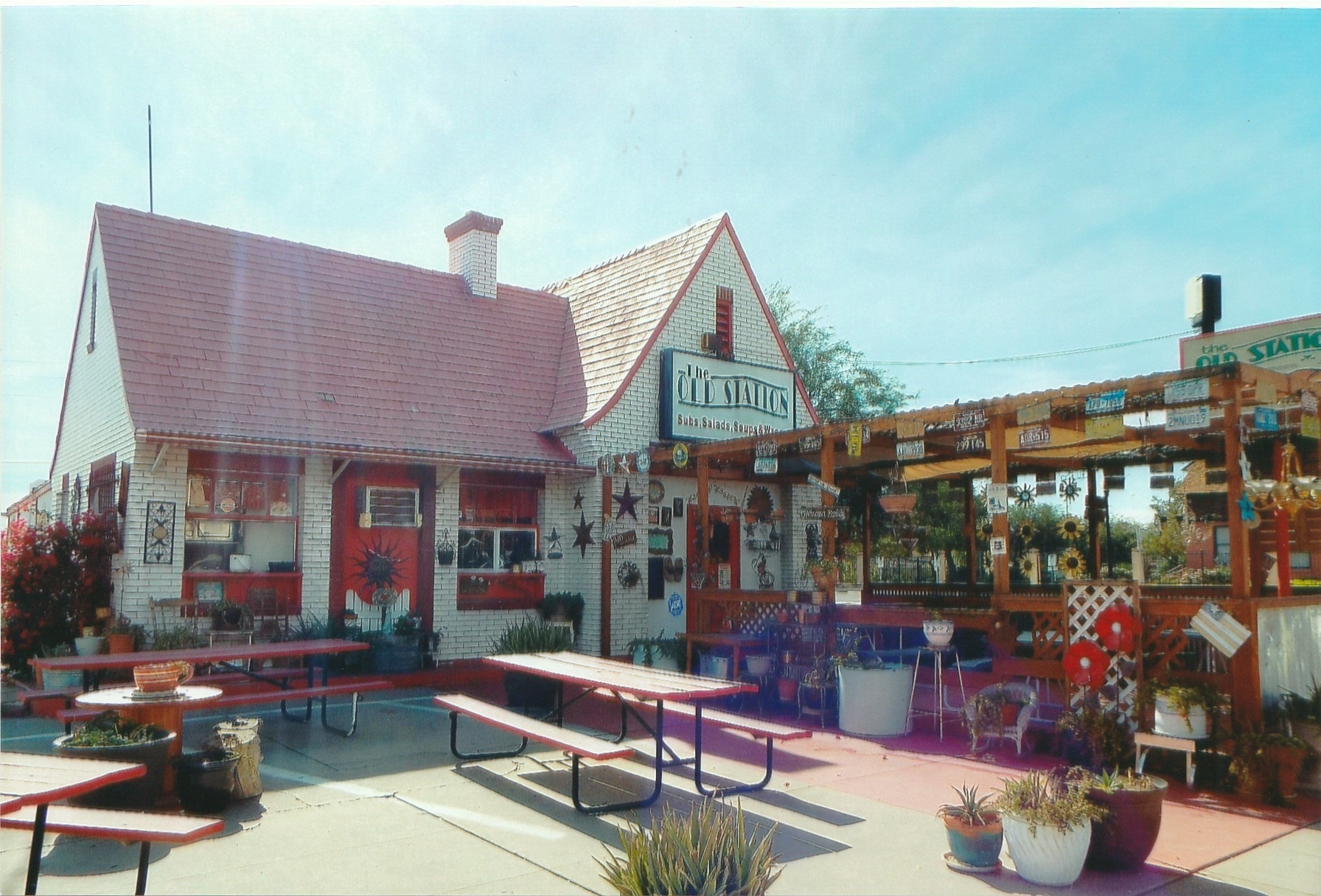
Mobile Gas Station built in 1926 and located at 1301 West Jefferson Street. It now houses "The Old Station Subs".

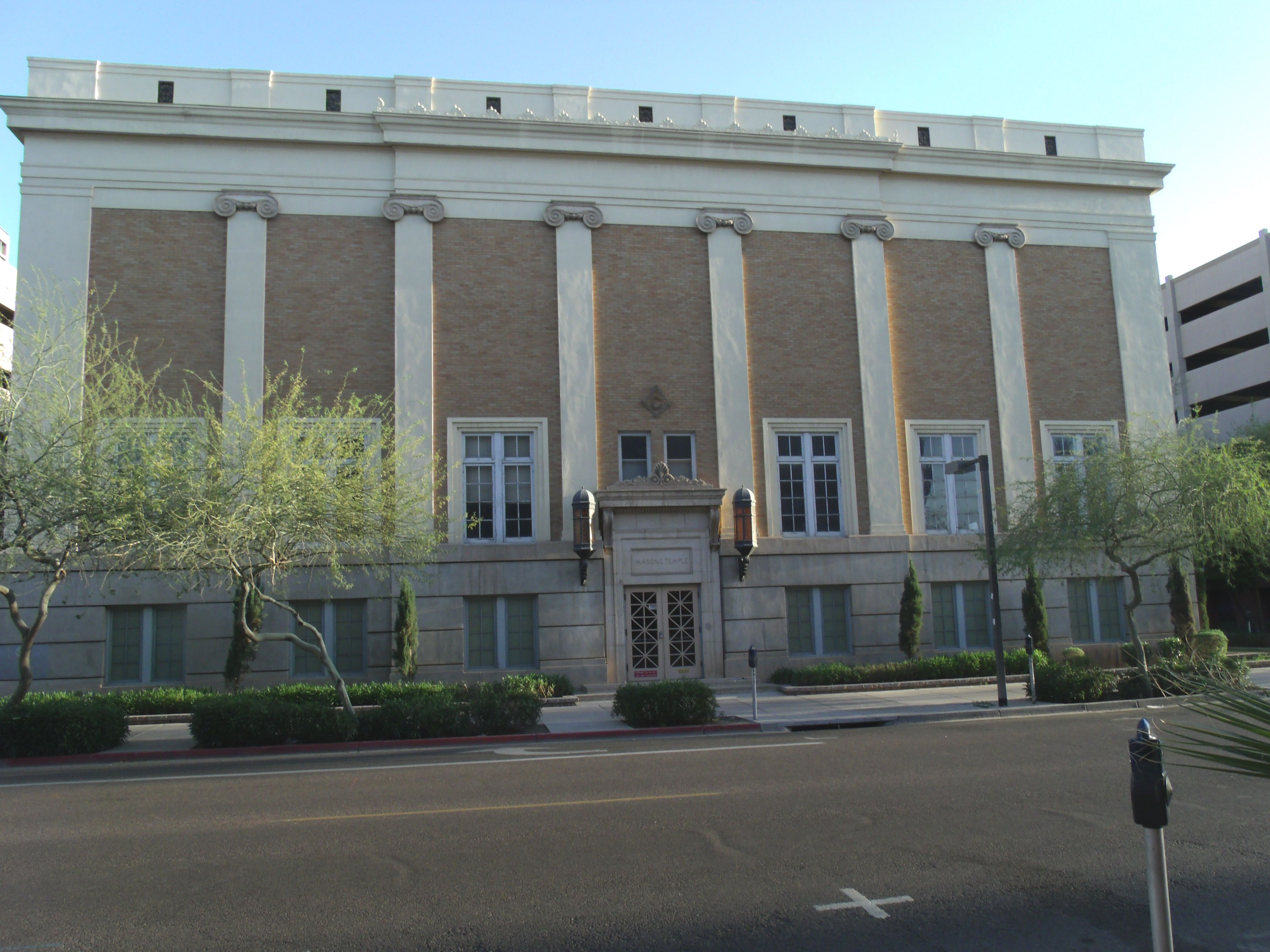
The Phoenix Masonic Temple was built in 1926 and is located at 345 W Monroe St. Listed in the Phoenix Historic Property Register.

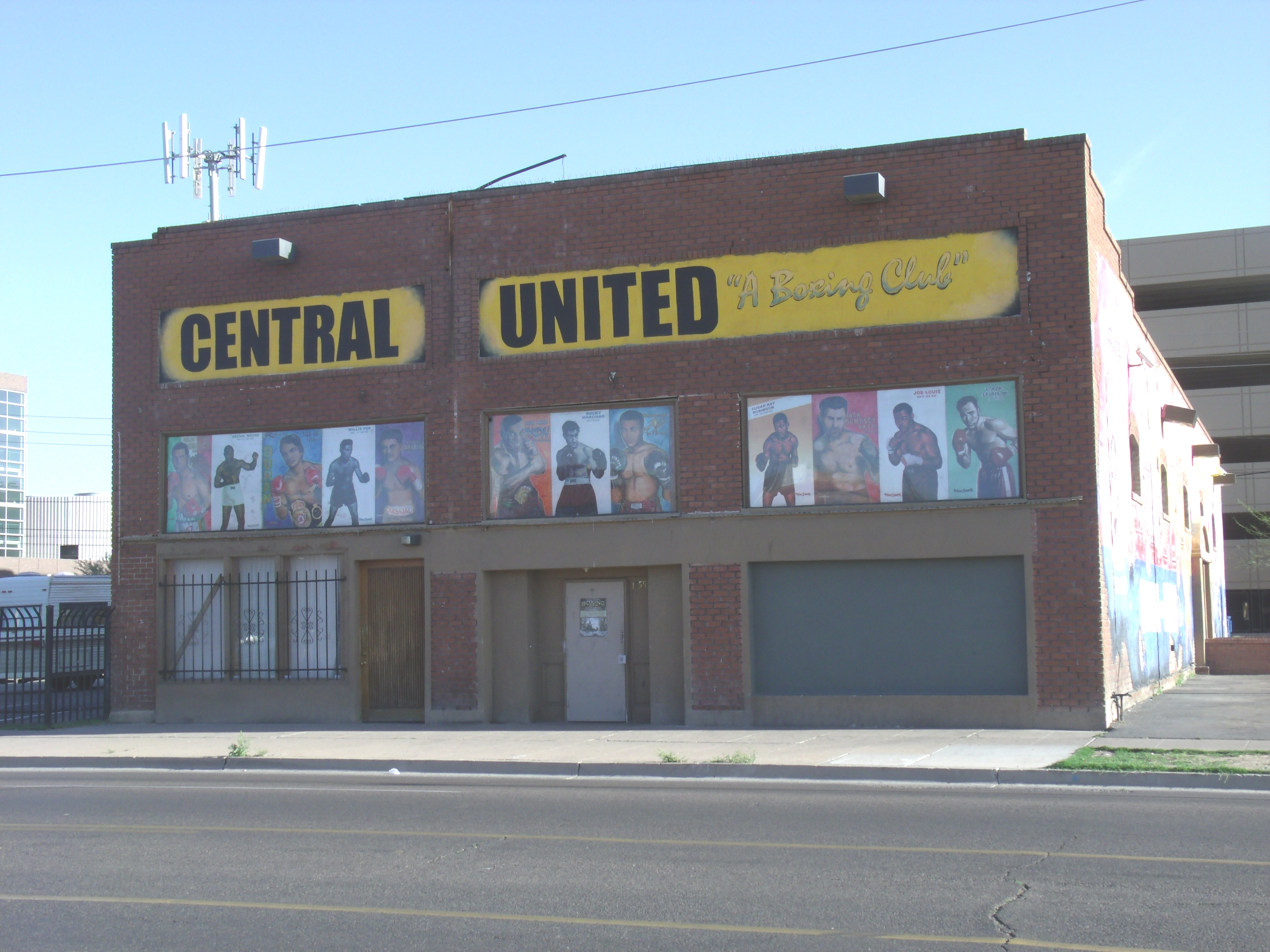
The Pay'n Takit No. 25 was built in 1926 and is located at 1753-1755 W. Van Buren. The building was listed in the National Register of Historic Places on September 5, 1985, reference: #85002070. as of 2012 it house the Central United "A boxing club".

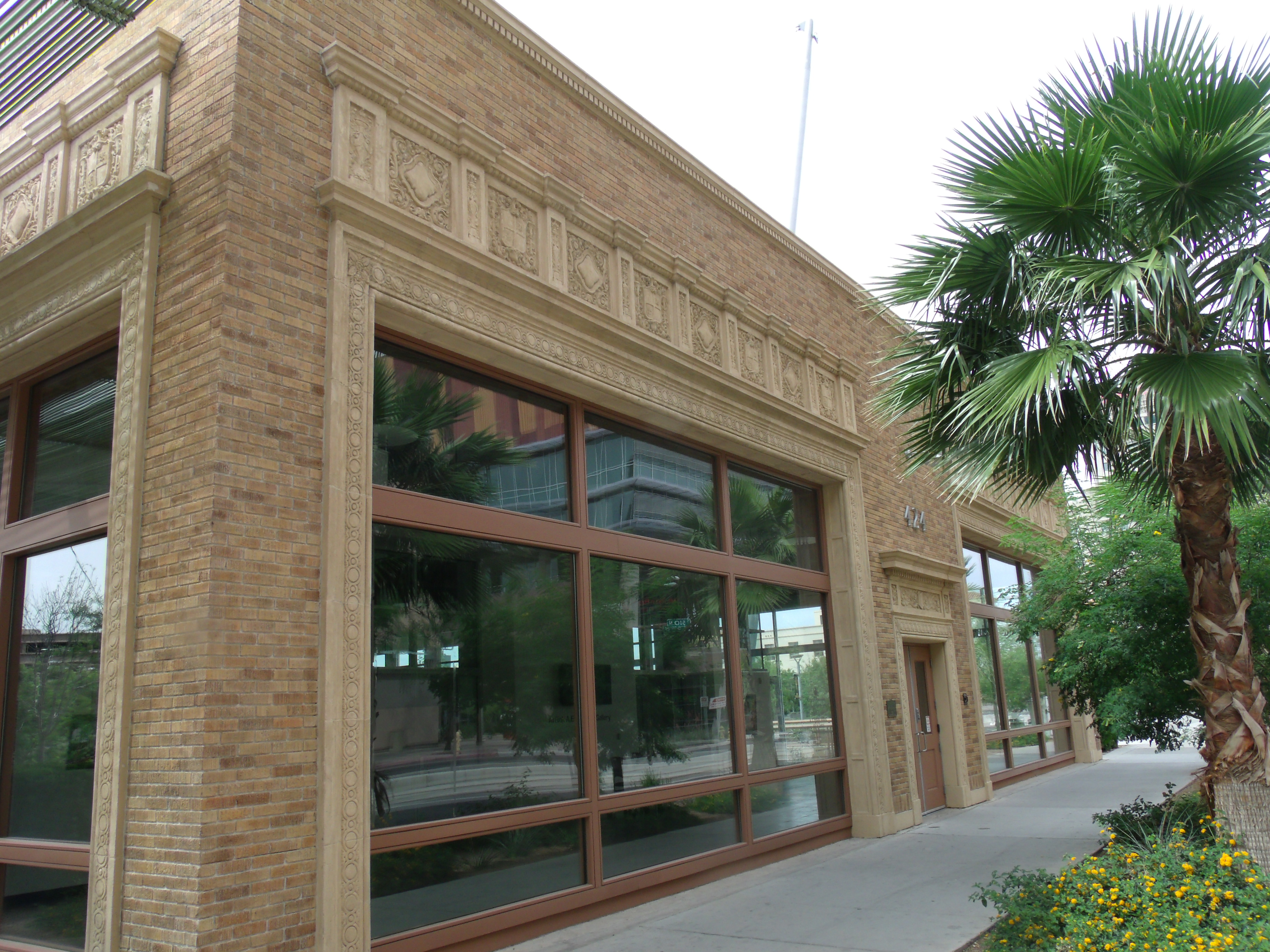
The A.E. England Motors Building was built in 1926 and is located at 424 N. Central Avenue. Listed in the Phoenix Historic Property Register.

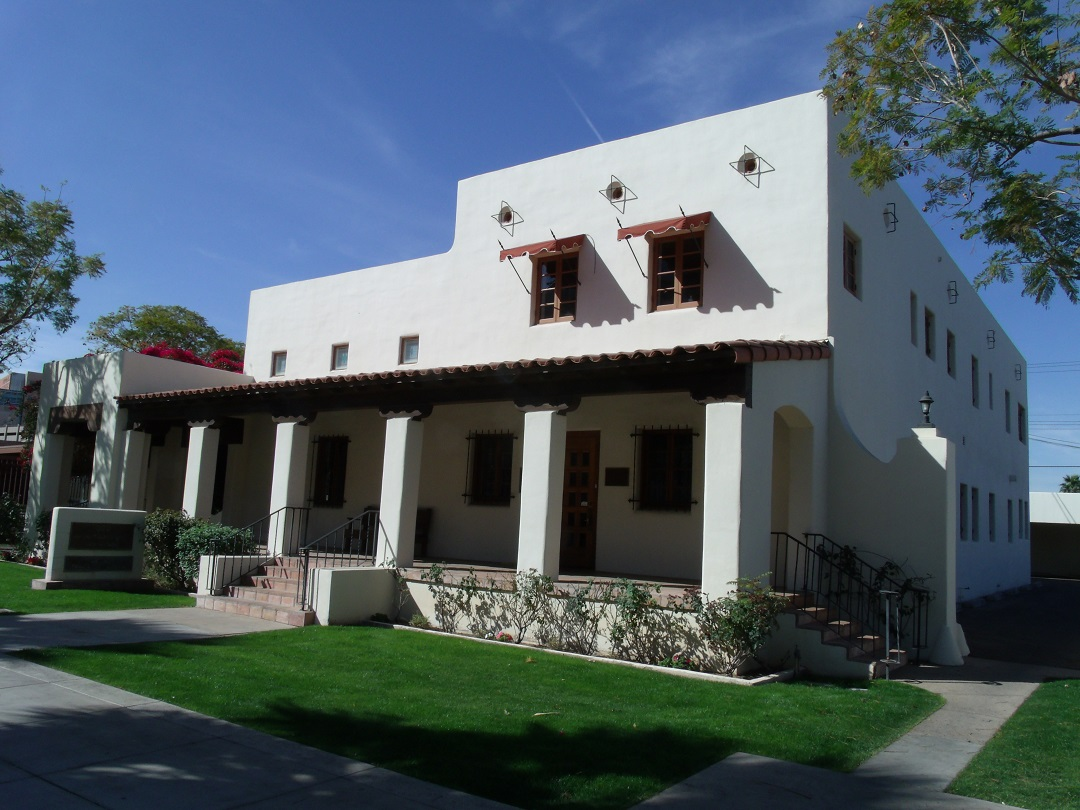
J.T. Whitney Funeral Chapel built in 1926 and located at 330 N. Second Avenue. It was once the house of mortician J.T. Whitney. Listed in the National Register of Historic Places, reference: #85002079.

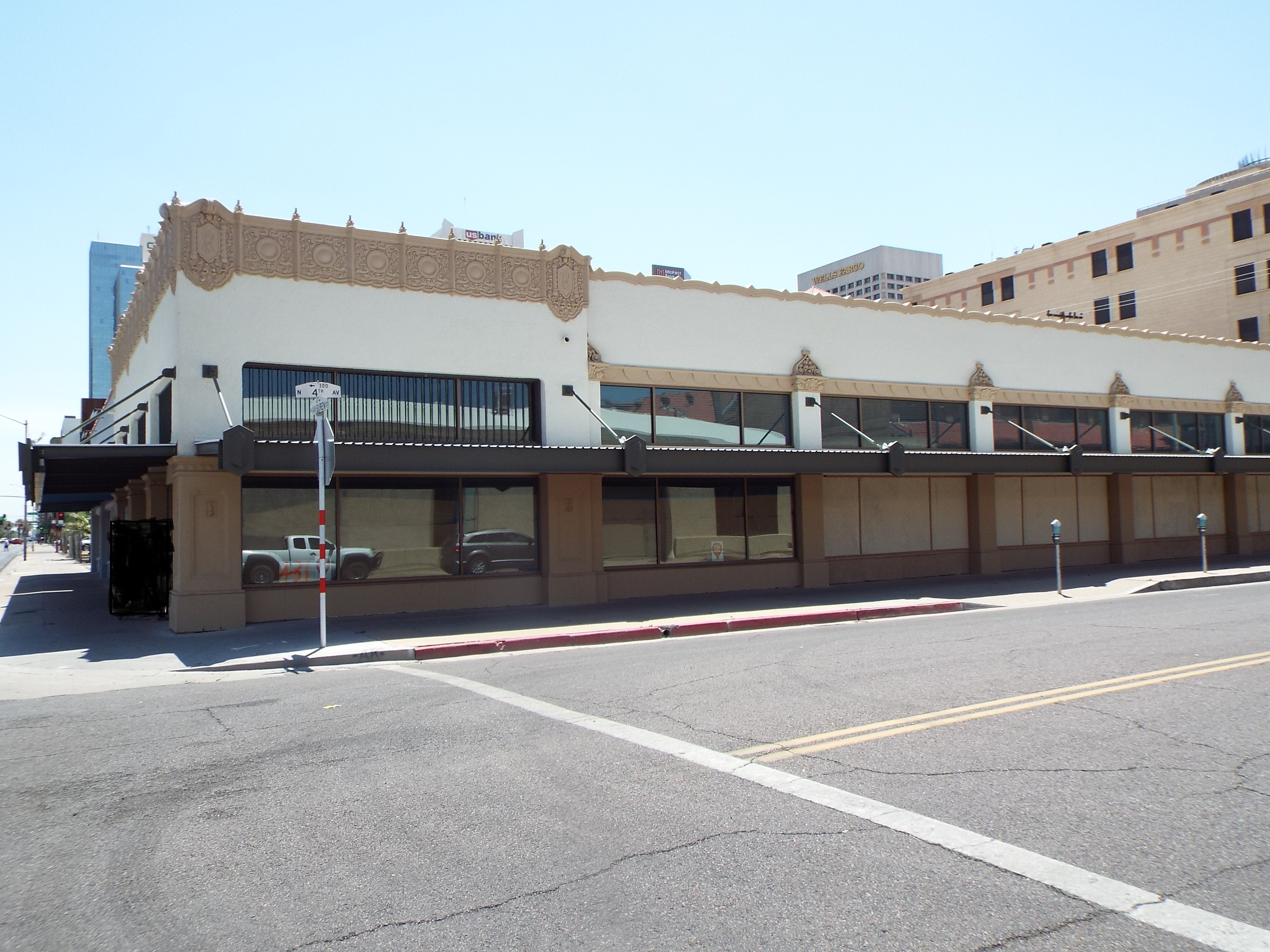
The Welnick Arcade Grocery Store building was built in 1927 and is located at 324 Van Buren Street. The building was listed in the National Register of Historic Places on August 9, 2016, reference: #16000490.

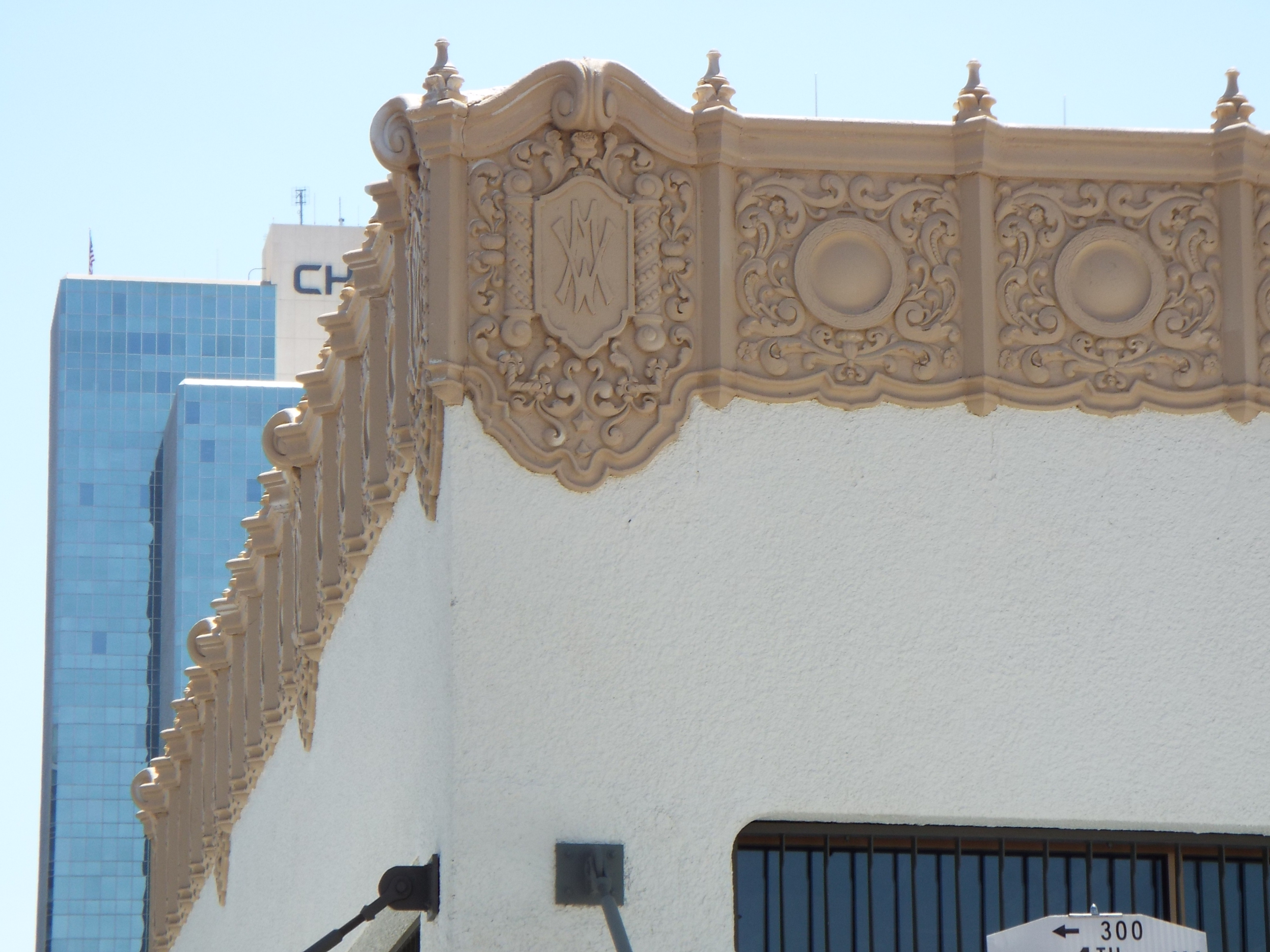
An ornament on the Welnick Arcade Grocery Store building.

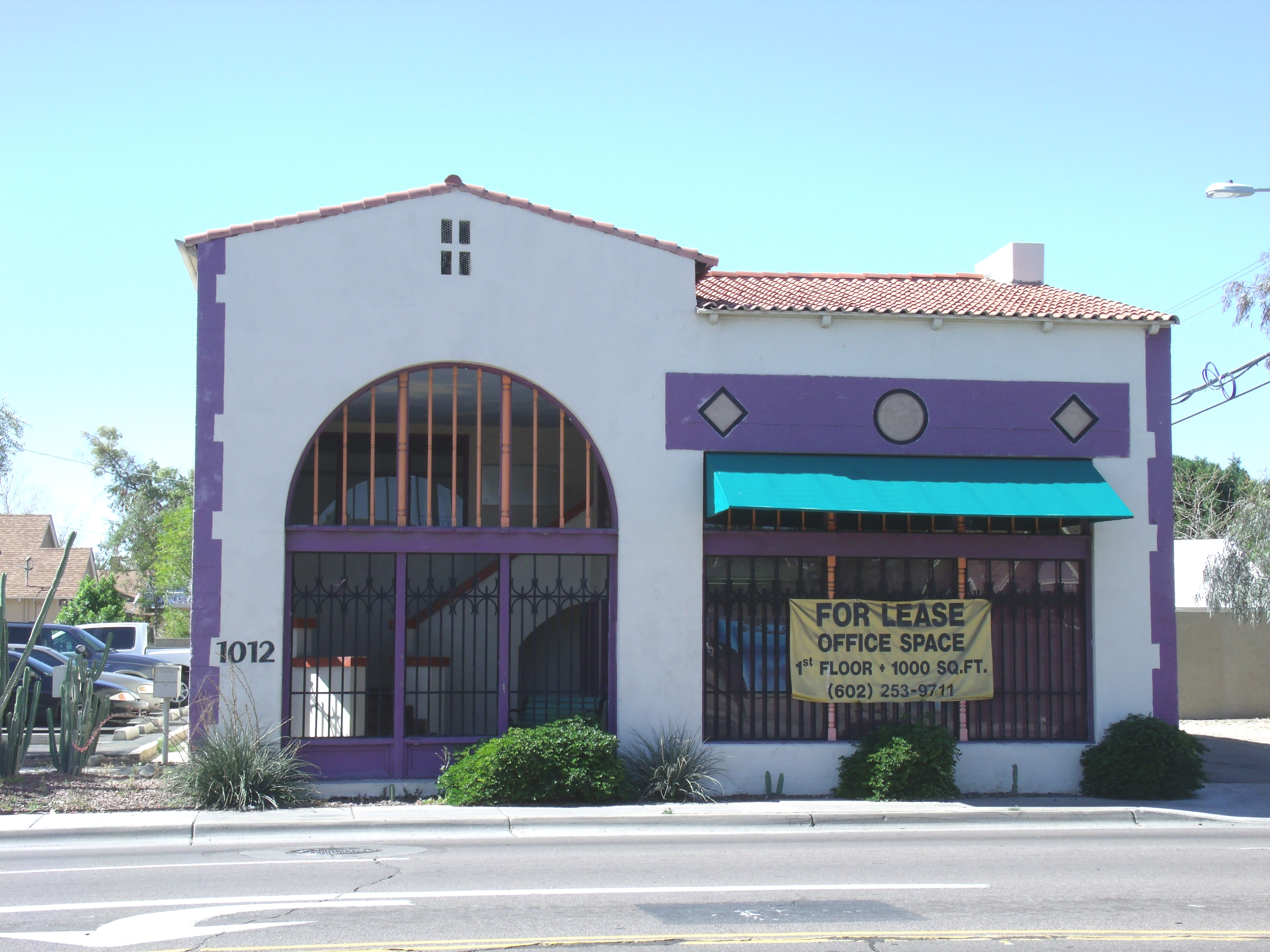
The Pay n Takit #5 was built in 1927 and is located at 1012 N. 7th Avenue. It was listed in the National Register of Historic Places in 1985, reference: #85002069.

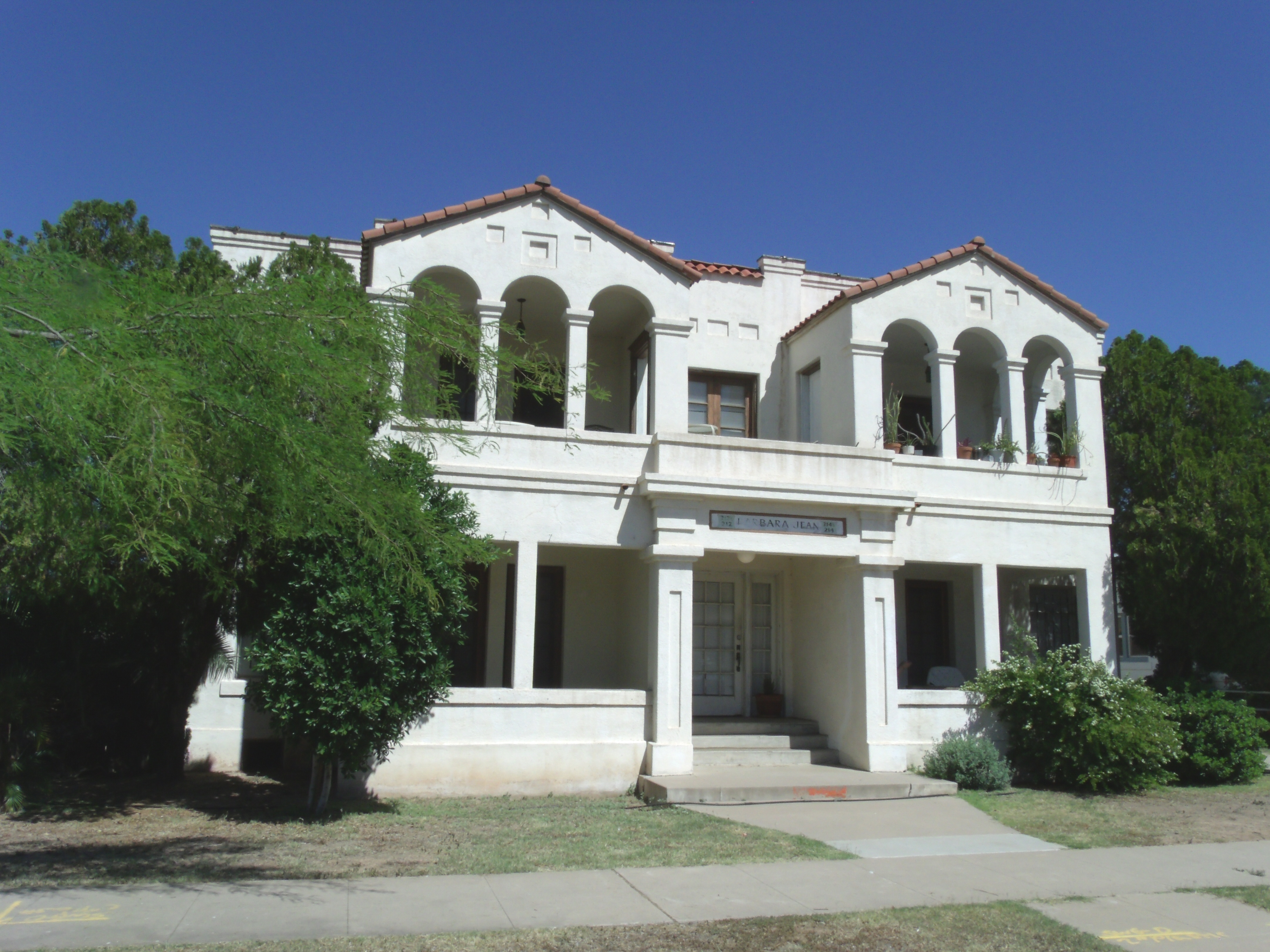
The Barbara Jean Apartments was built in 1927 and is located at 212-214 E. Portland St. It was Listed in the Phoenix Historic Property Register in September 2004.

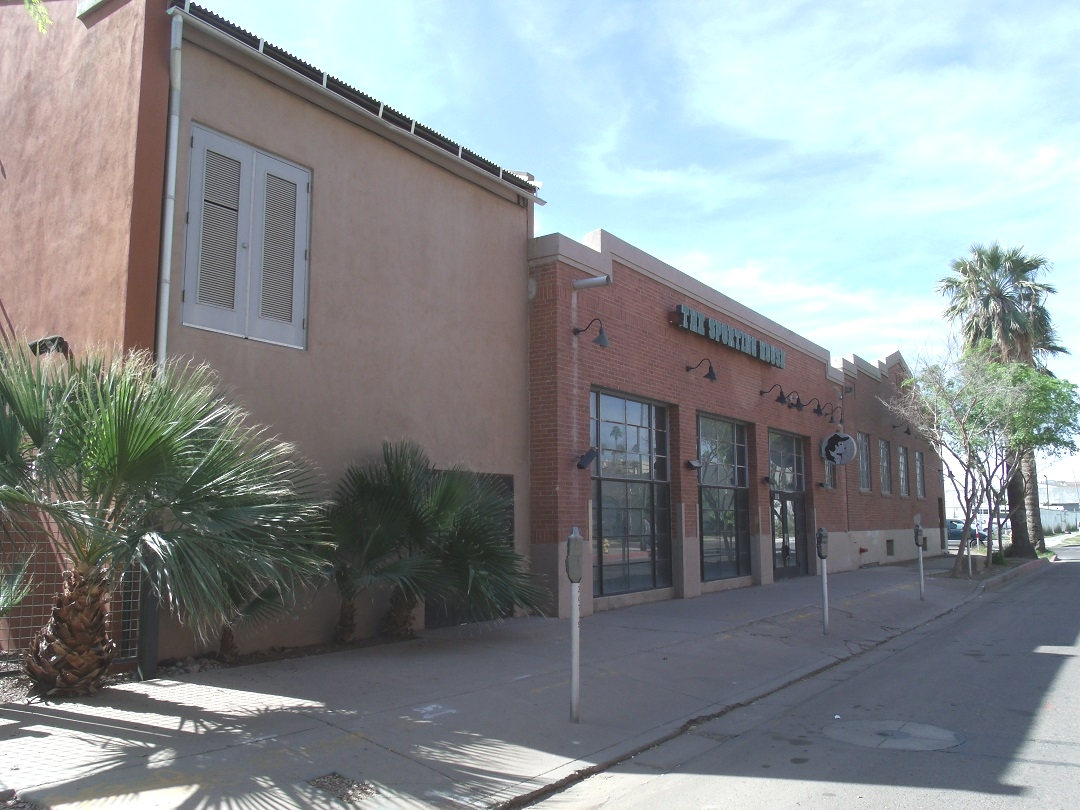
The Blake, Moffitt, Towne Janitorial Co. Warehouse built in 1927 and located at 101 E. Buchanan St. Designated as a landmark with Historic Preservation-Landmark (HP-L) overlay zoning. Listed in the Phoenix Historic Property Register.

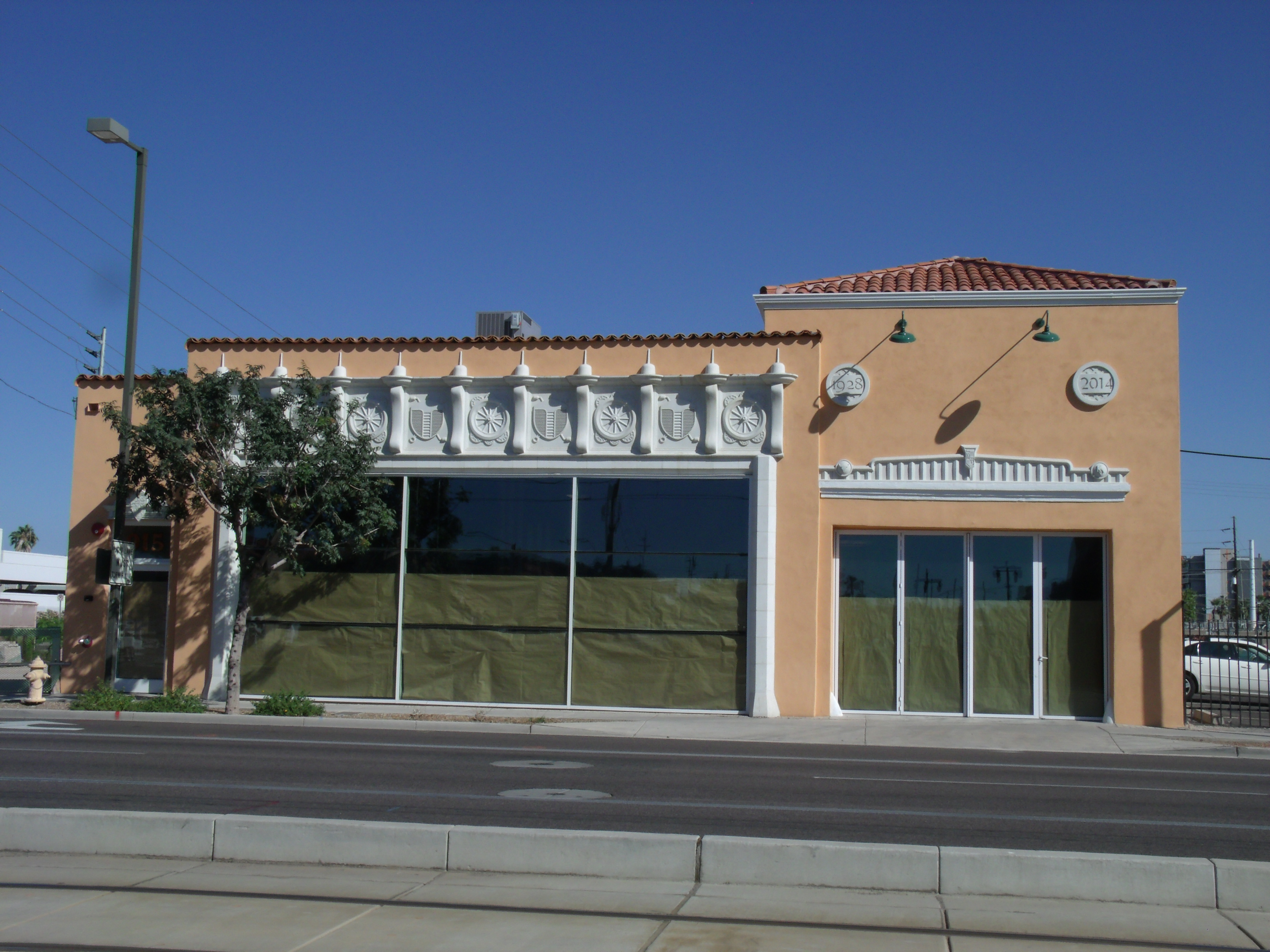
The C. P. Stephans De Soto Six Motor Cars building was built in 1927 and is located at 915 S. Central Avenue. On February 20, 2013, the property was listed in the National Register of Historic Places, reference: #13000019.

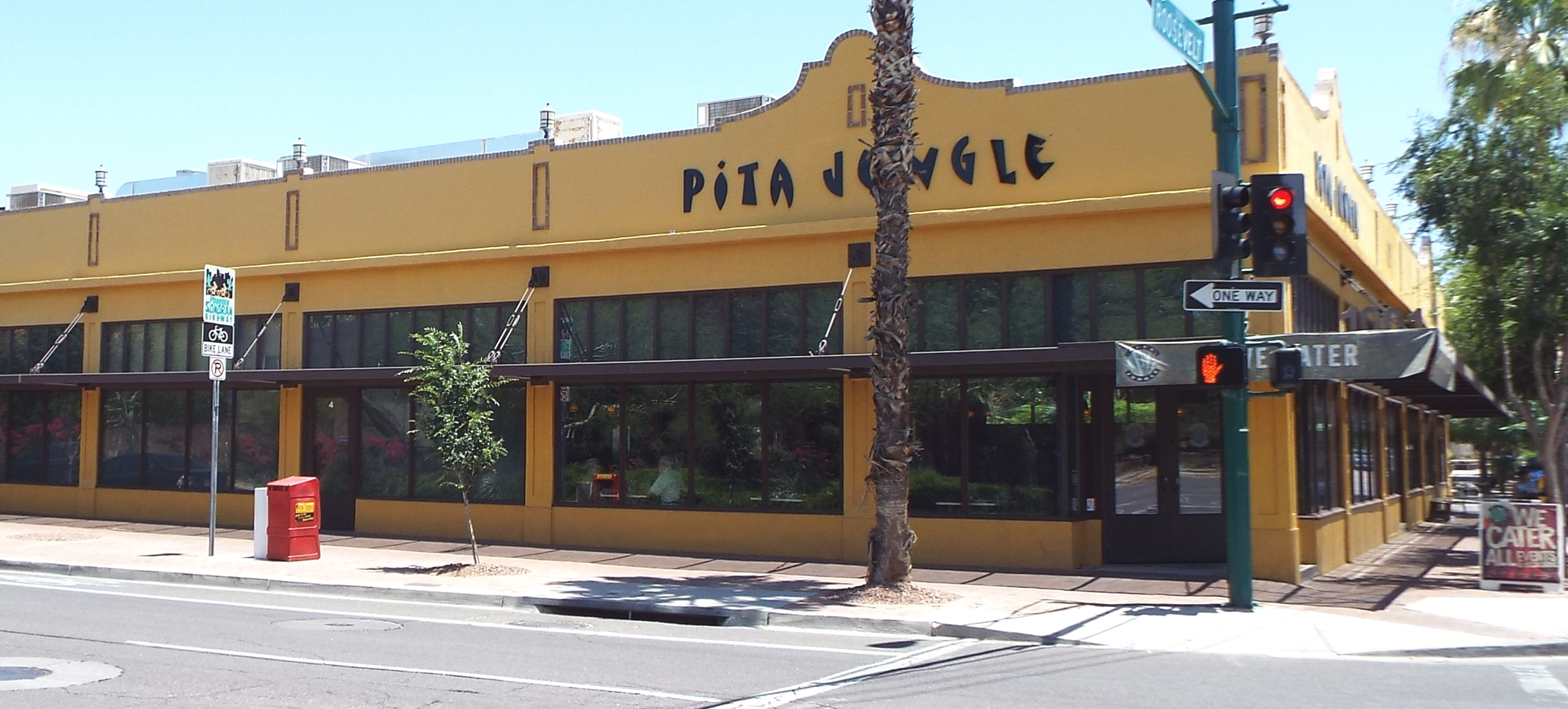
The Gold Spot Shopping Center built in 1925 and located at 1001 N. 3rd Avenue. The building served as a Shopping Center and Grocery from 1925 to 1983. Now serves as a Marketing Center. The building is in the Roosevelt Historic District which was listed in the National Register of Historic Places on November 30, 1983, reference #83003490.

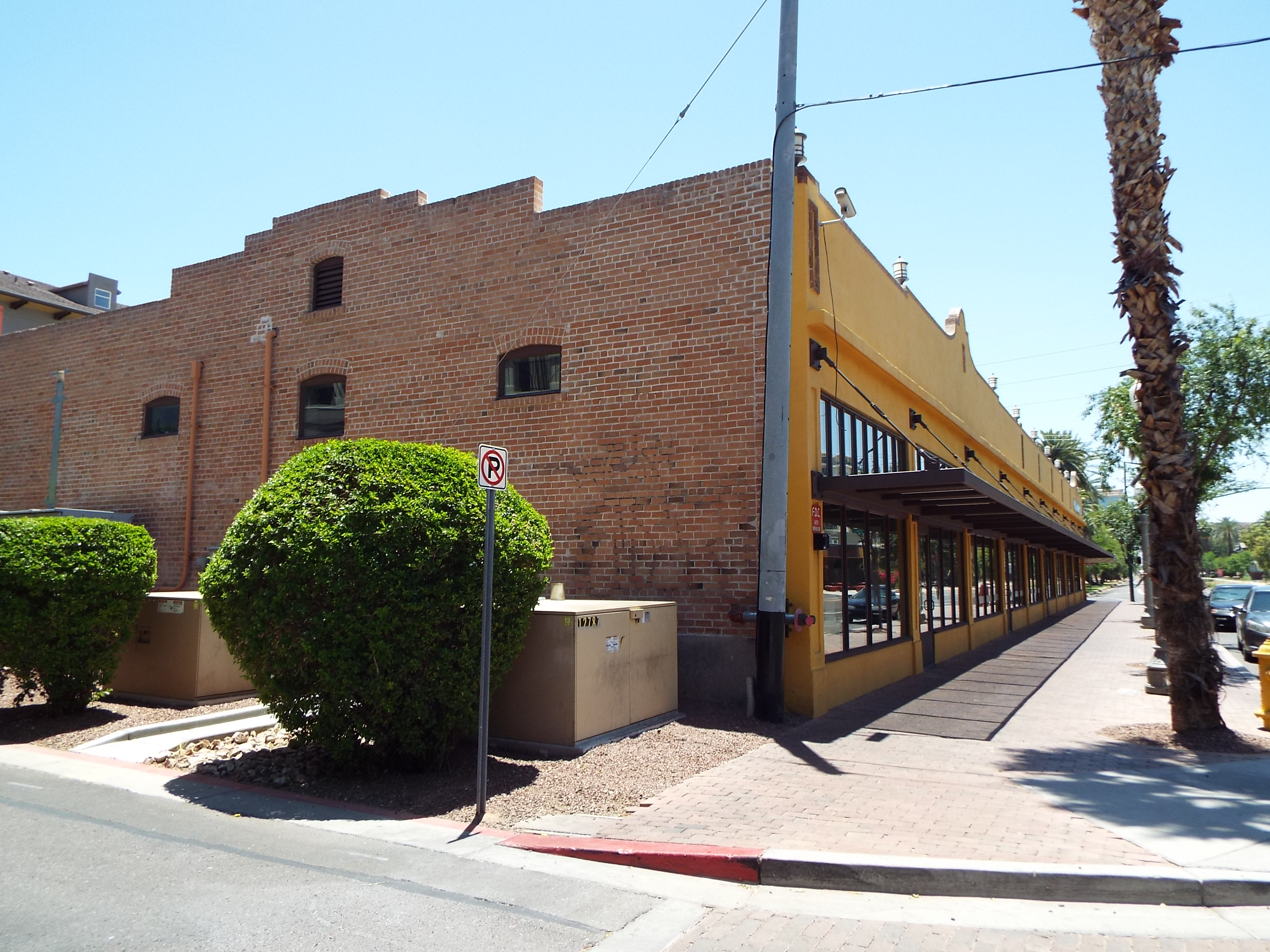
Different view of the Gold Spot Shopping Center.

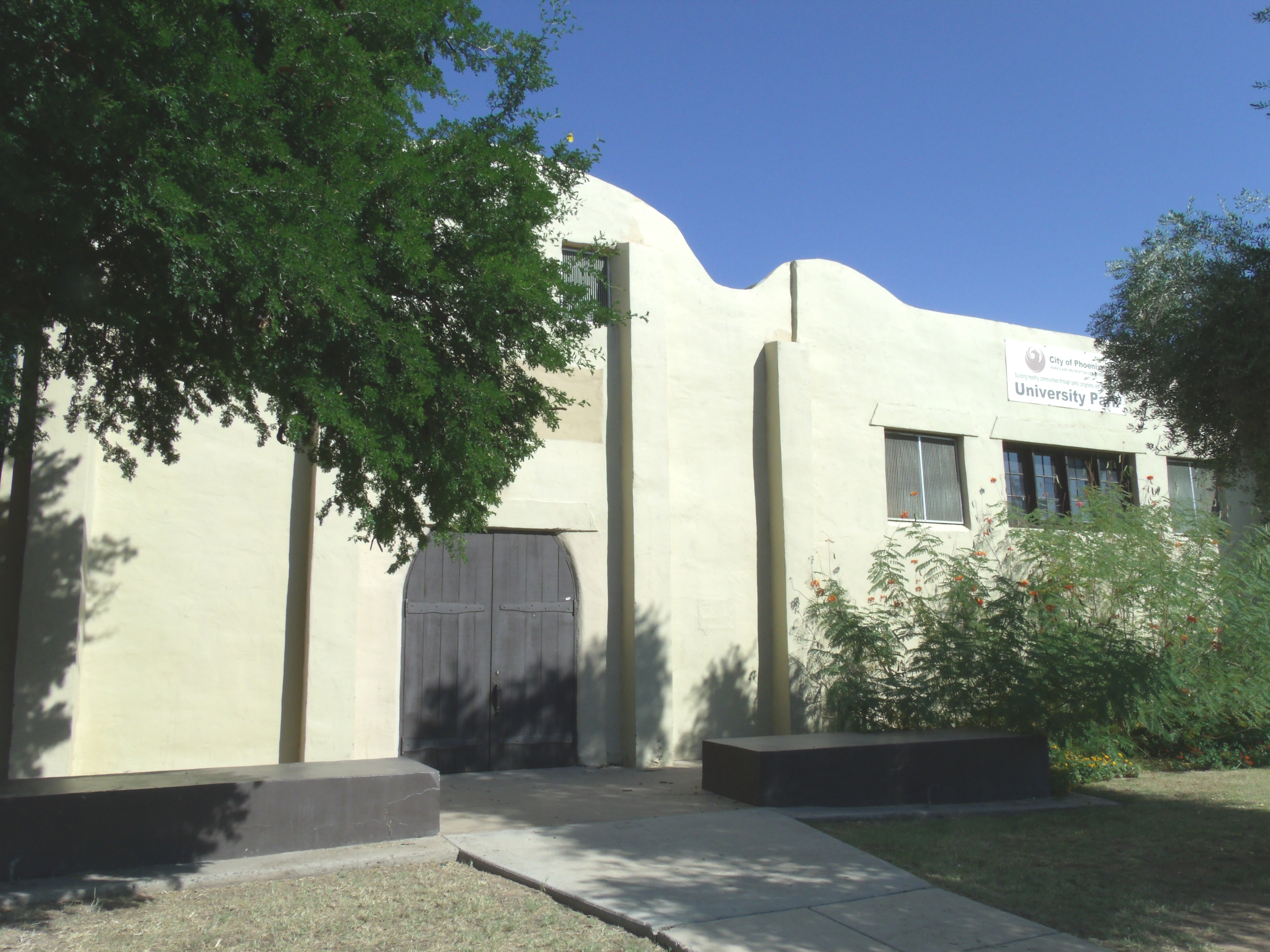
The Arizona Museum building was built in 1927 and is located on the grounds of University Park at 1002 W. Van Buren St. The building was listed in the Phoenix Historic Property Register in April 1989.

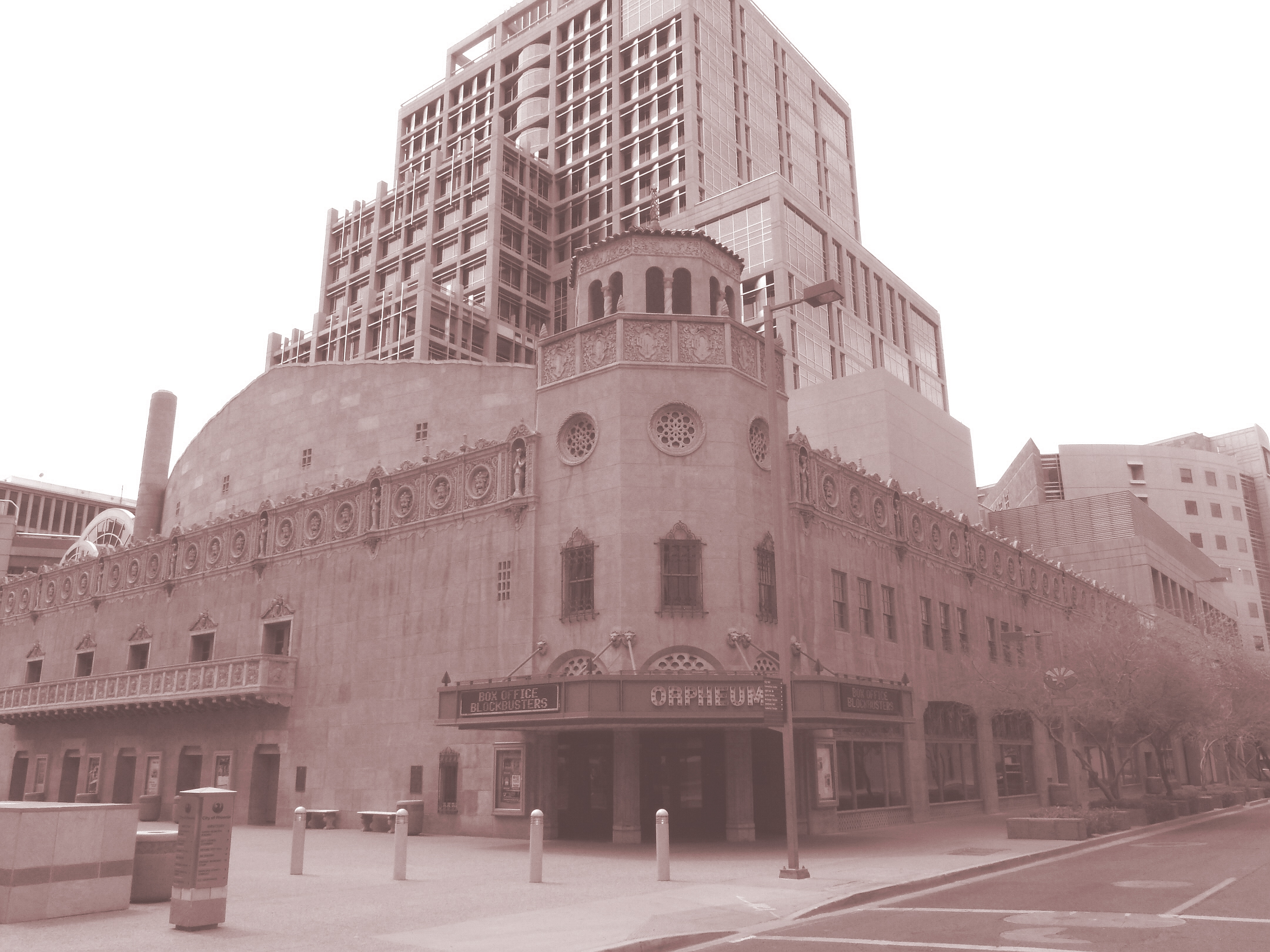
The Orpheum Theatre was built in 1927 and is located at 209 W. Adams St. It was listed in the National Register of Historic Places on October 1, 1985, reference: #85002067.

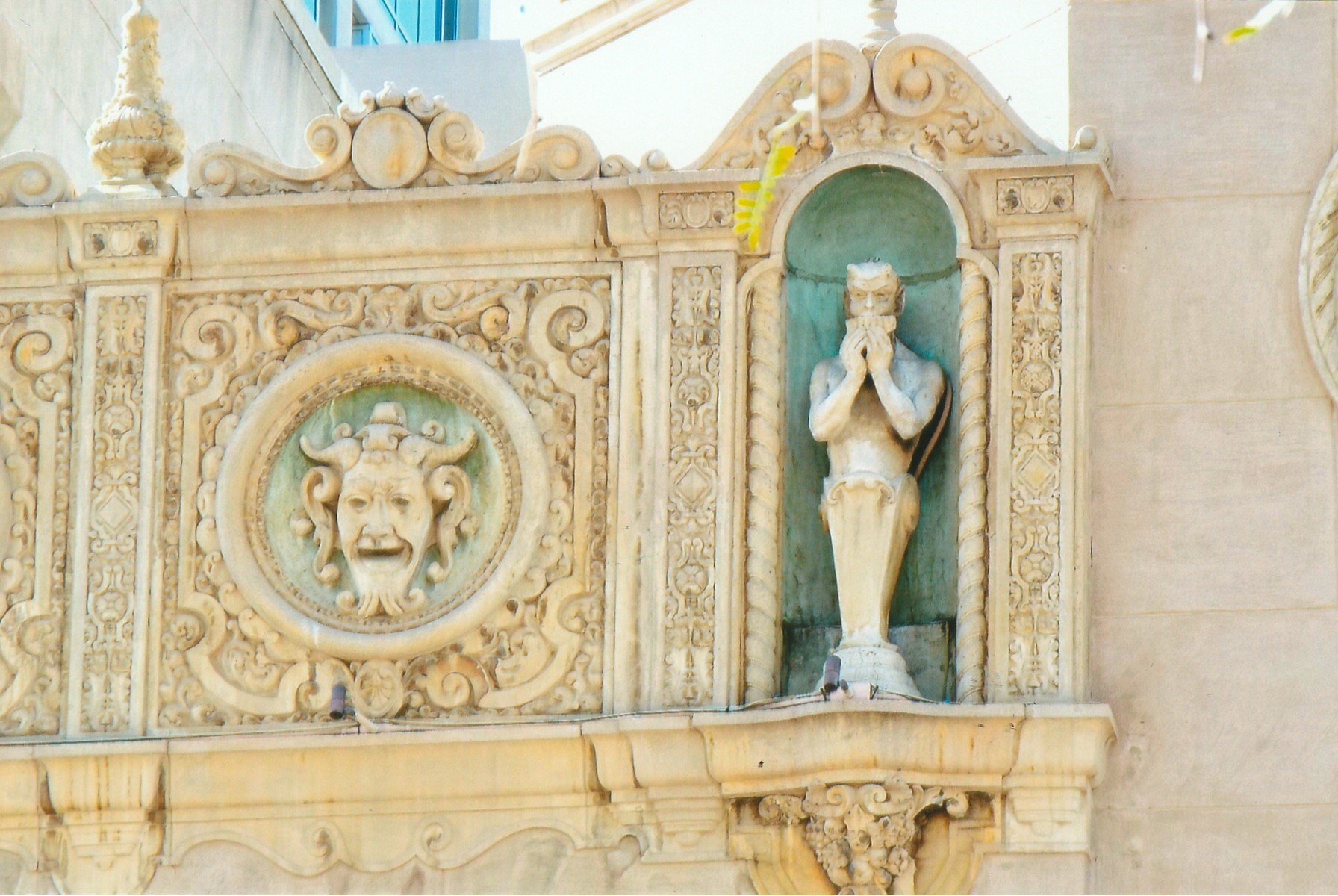
Orpheum Theatre ornament.

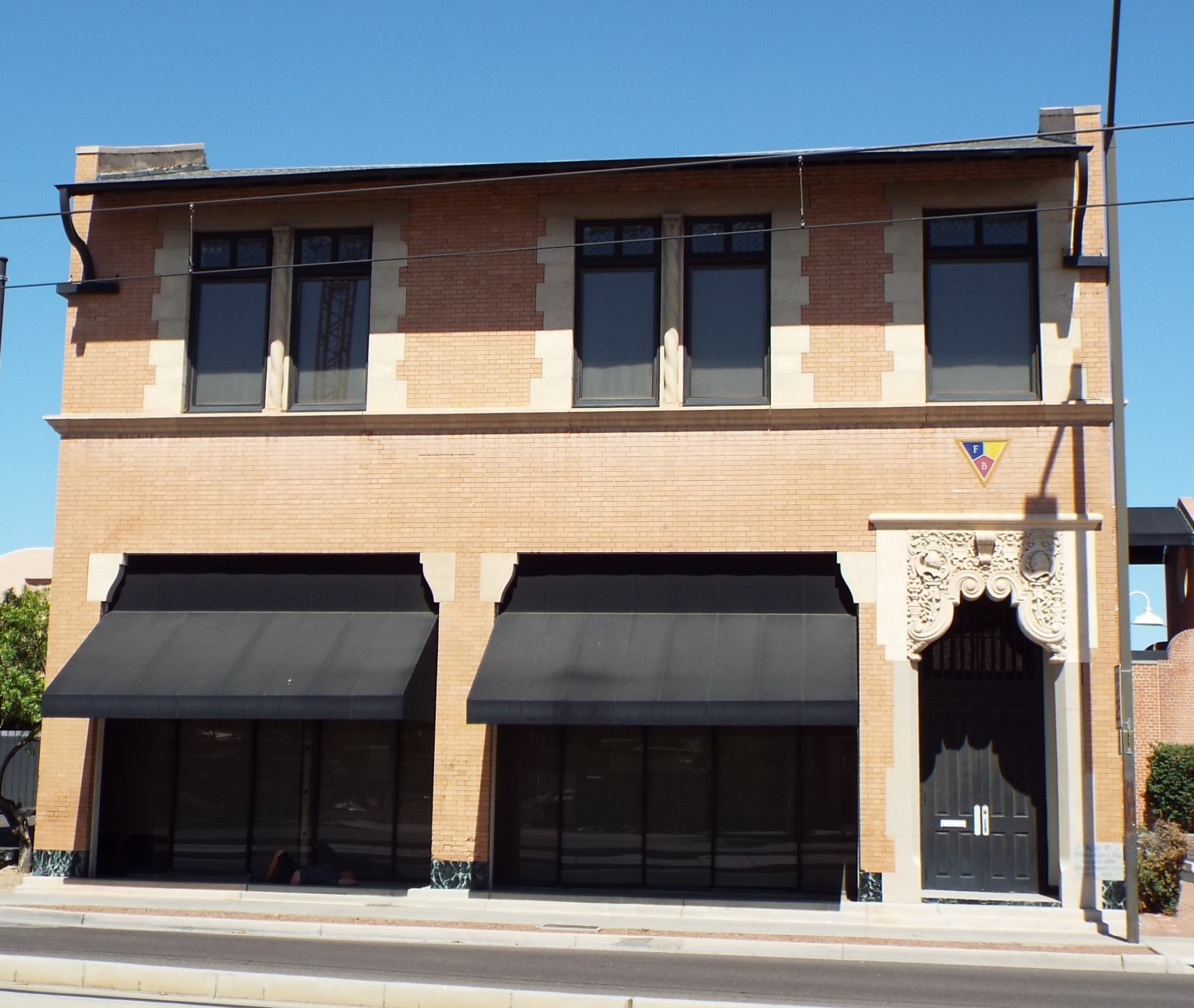
Knights of Pythias Building built in 1928 and located in 146 E. Washington St. Listed in the National Register of Historic Places, reference: #85002063.

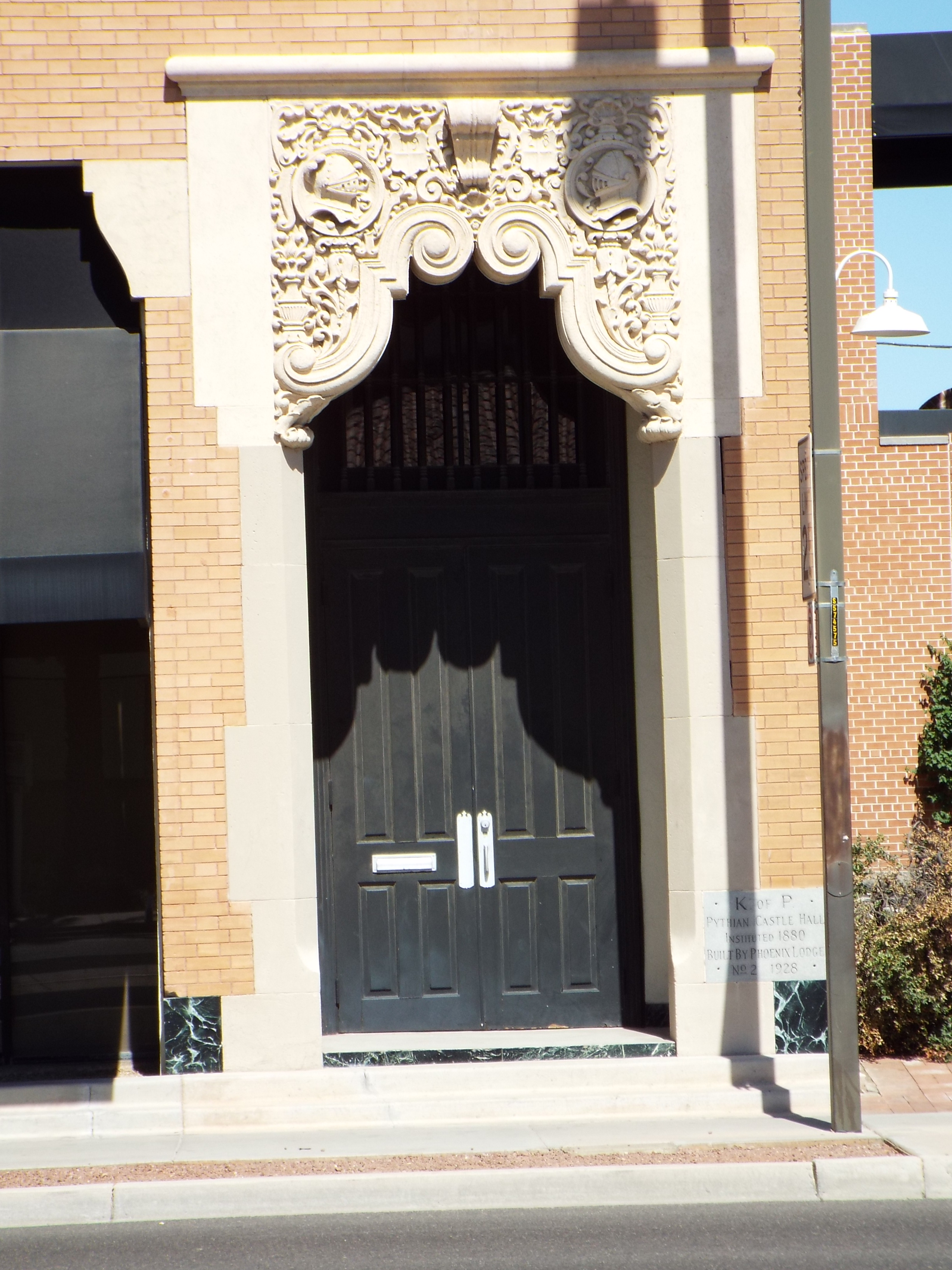
Front entrance of the Knights of Pythias Building.

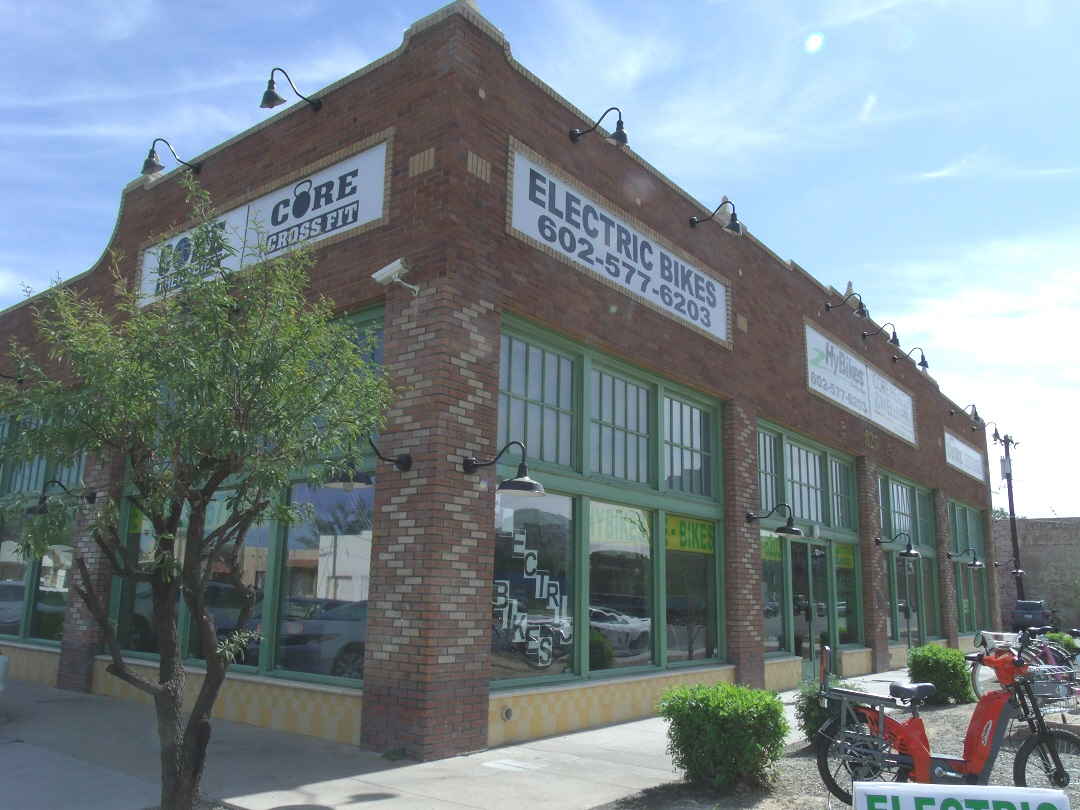
J.B. Bayless Store No. 7 built in 1928 and located at 825 N. Seventh St. Listed in the National Register of Historic Places, reference: #85002048

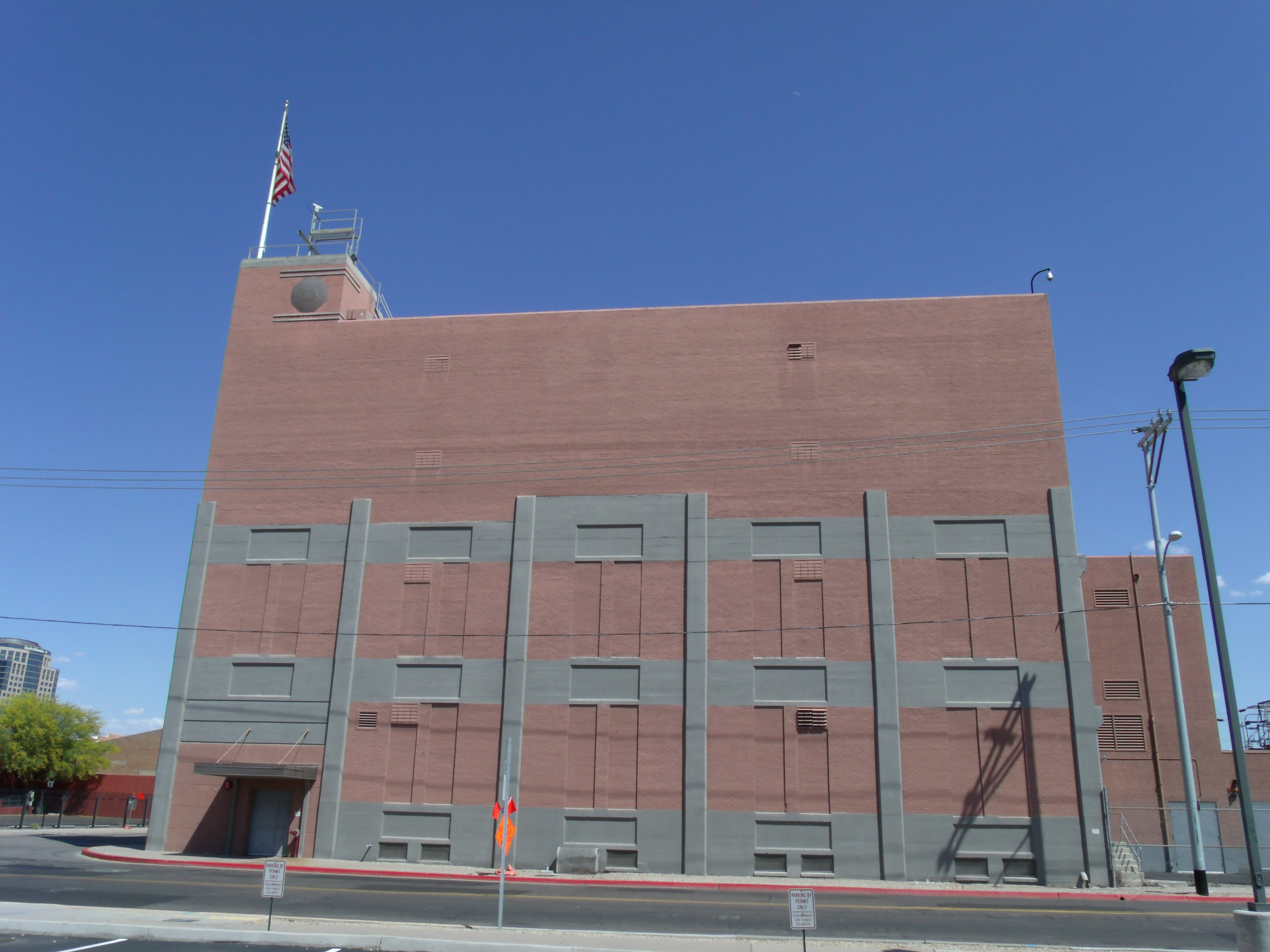
Central Arizona Light & Power Co. Warehouse built in 1928 and located at 501 S. Third Avenue. Designated as a landmark with Historic Preservation-Landmark (HP-L) overlay zoning. Listed in the Phoenix Historic Property Register.

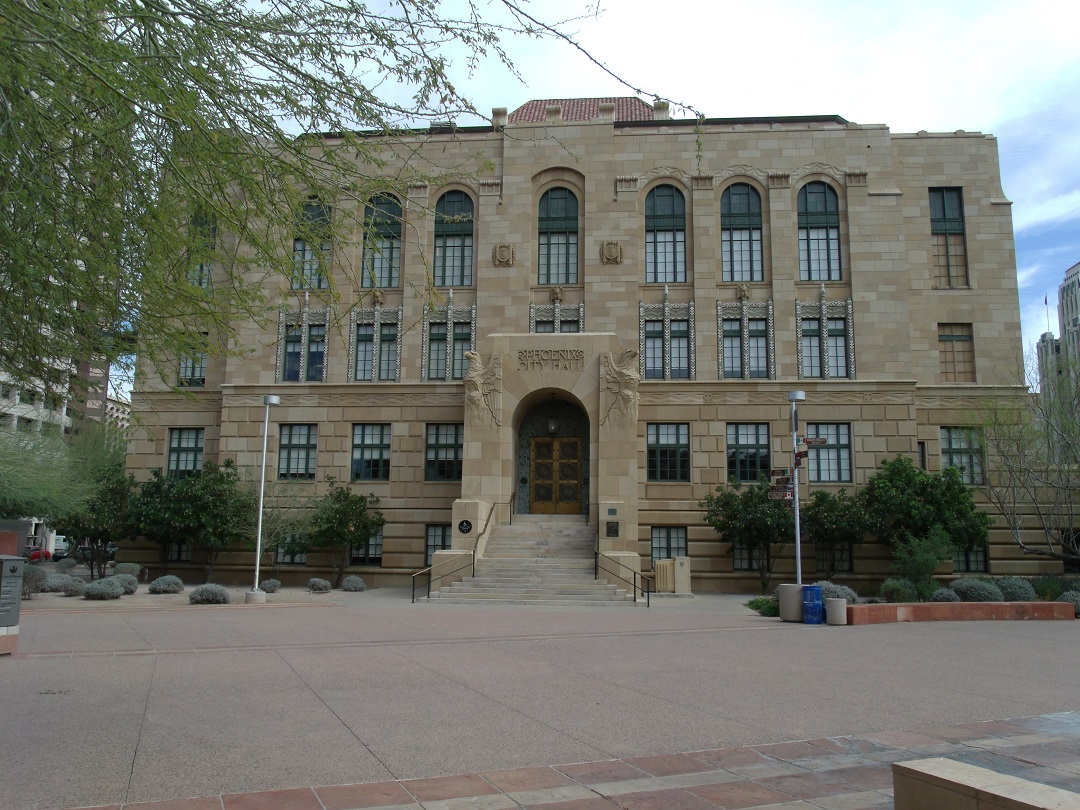
Historic Old Phoenix City Hall built in 1928 and located at 17 S. Second Avenue. This structure served as the Phoenix's City Hall until 1994 when the a new building was completed to serve as such. Designated as a landmark with Historic Preservation-Landmark (HP-L) overlay zoning. Listed in the Phoenix Historic Property Register.

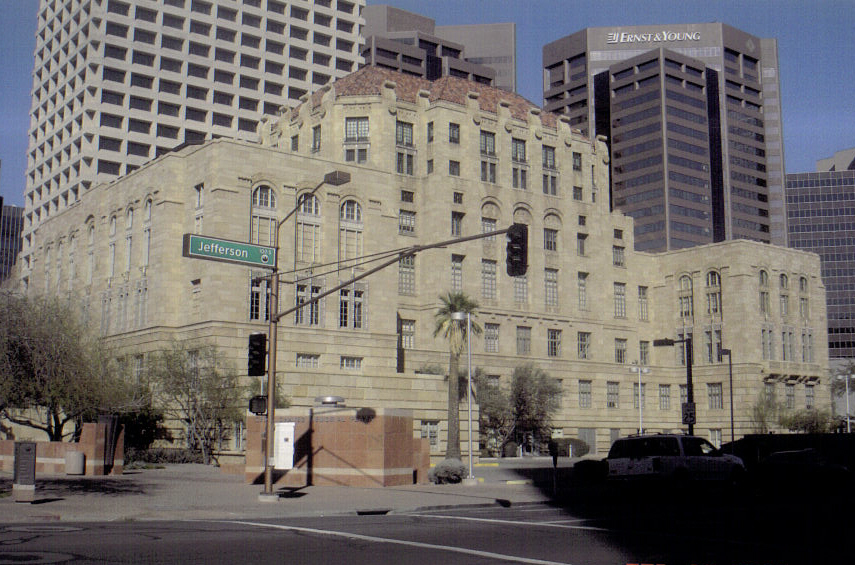
Maricopa County Courthouse built in 1928. In this court house the trial of infamous Winnie Ruth Judd, a.k.a. "The Trunk Murderess", was held. The historic "Miranda rights" were established in this court after the arrest of Ernesto Miranda. Both Judd and Miranda were incarcerated in the jail located on the sixth floor. Listed in the National Register of Historic Places.

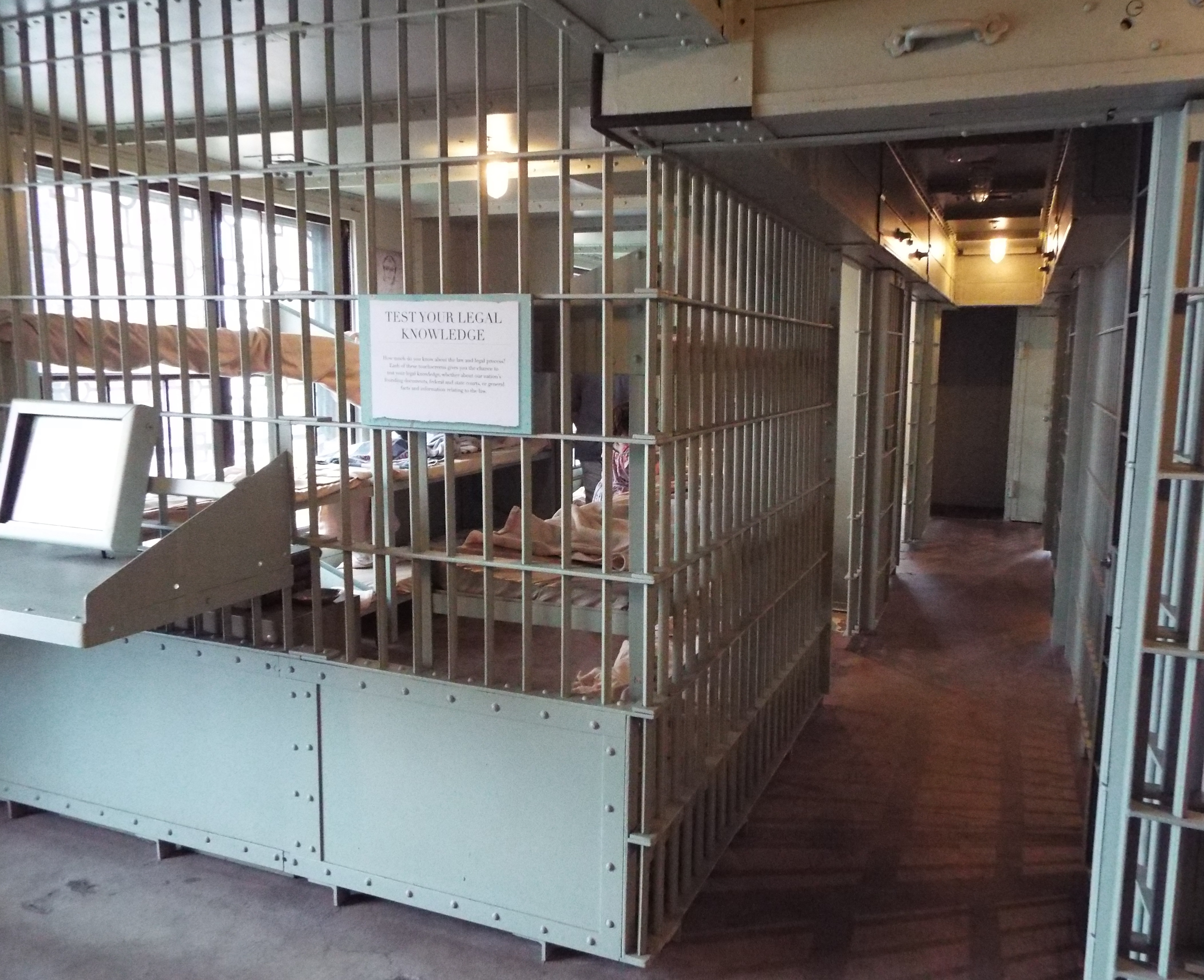
Maricopa County Jail where Judd and Miranda were once incarcerated.

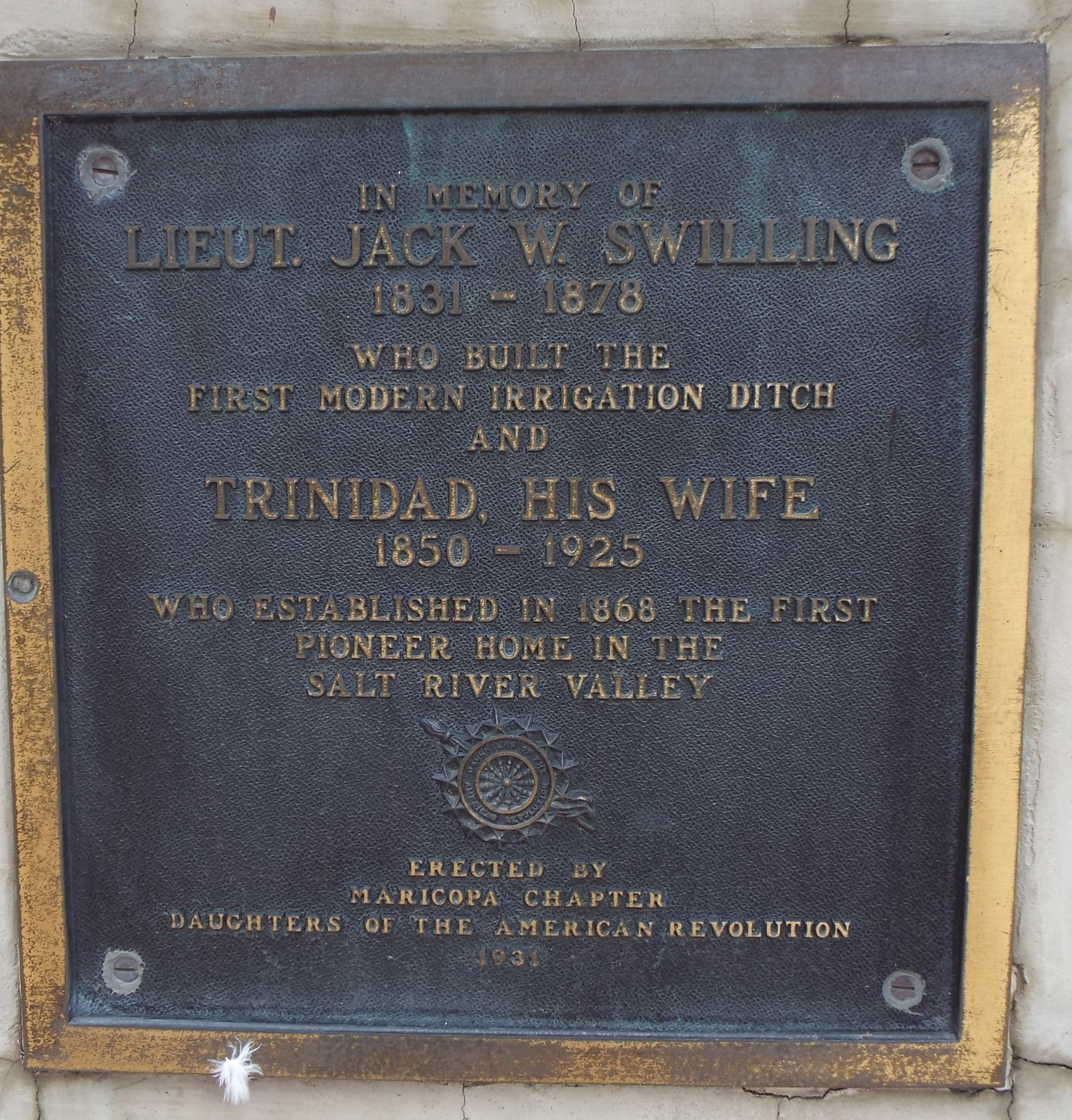
The 1931 Jack and Trinidad Swilling plaque on the water fountain in front of the historic Maricopa County Courthouse

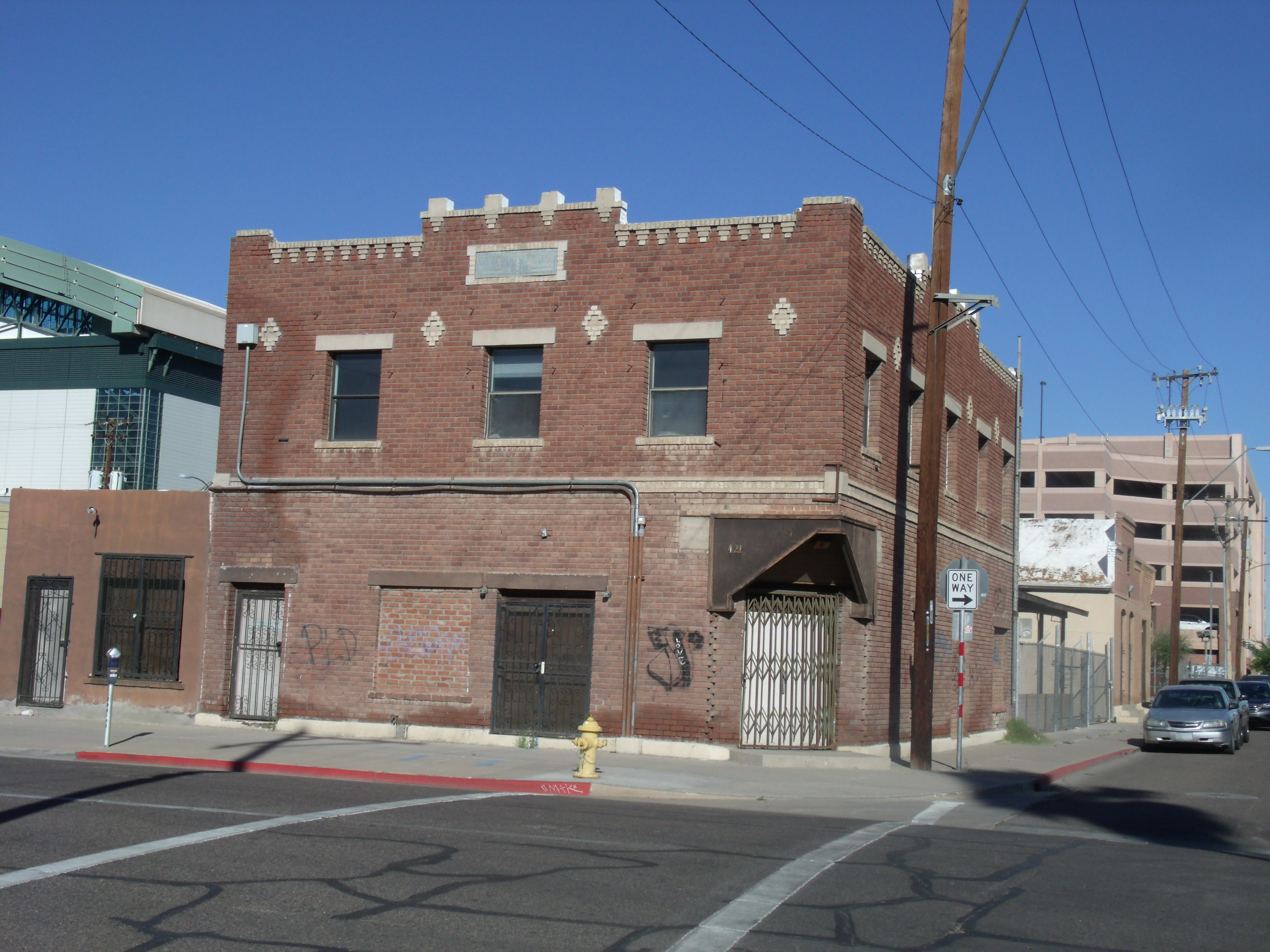
Gerardo's Building built in 1928 and located at 421 S. Third St. It once housed a café on the first floor and residential rentals on the upper level. Listed in the National Register of Historic Places, reference: #85002057.

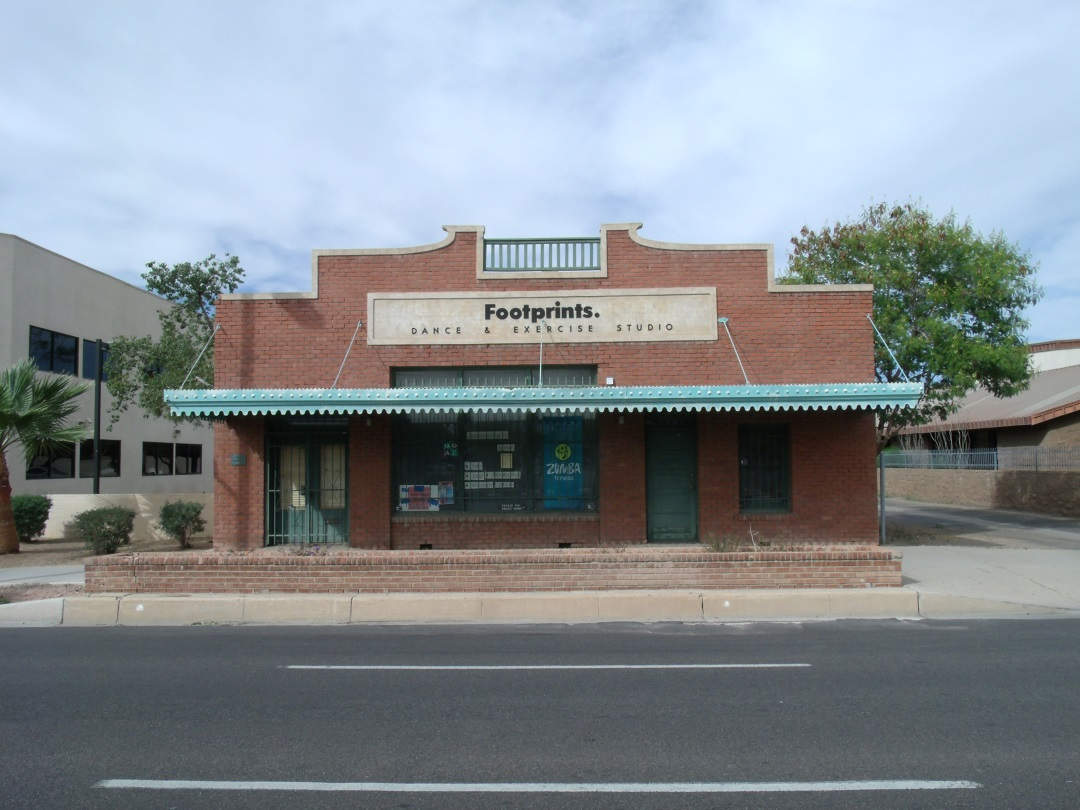
Jim Ong's Market built in 1928 and located at 1110 E. Washington St. The structure, one of two built by the owner in the Chinese Community, also served as the home of the Ong family. Listed in the National Register of Historic Places, reference: #82002084.

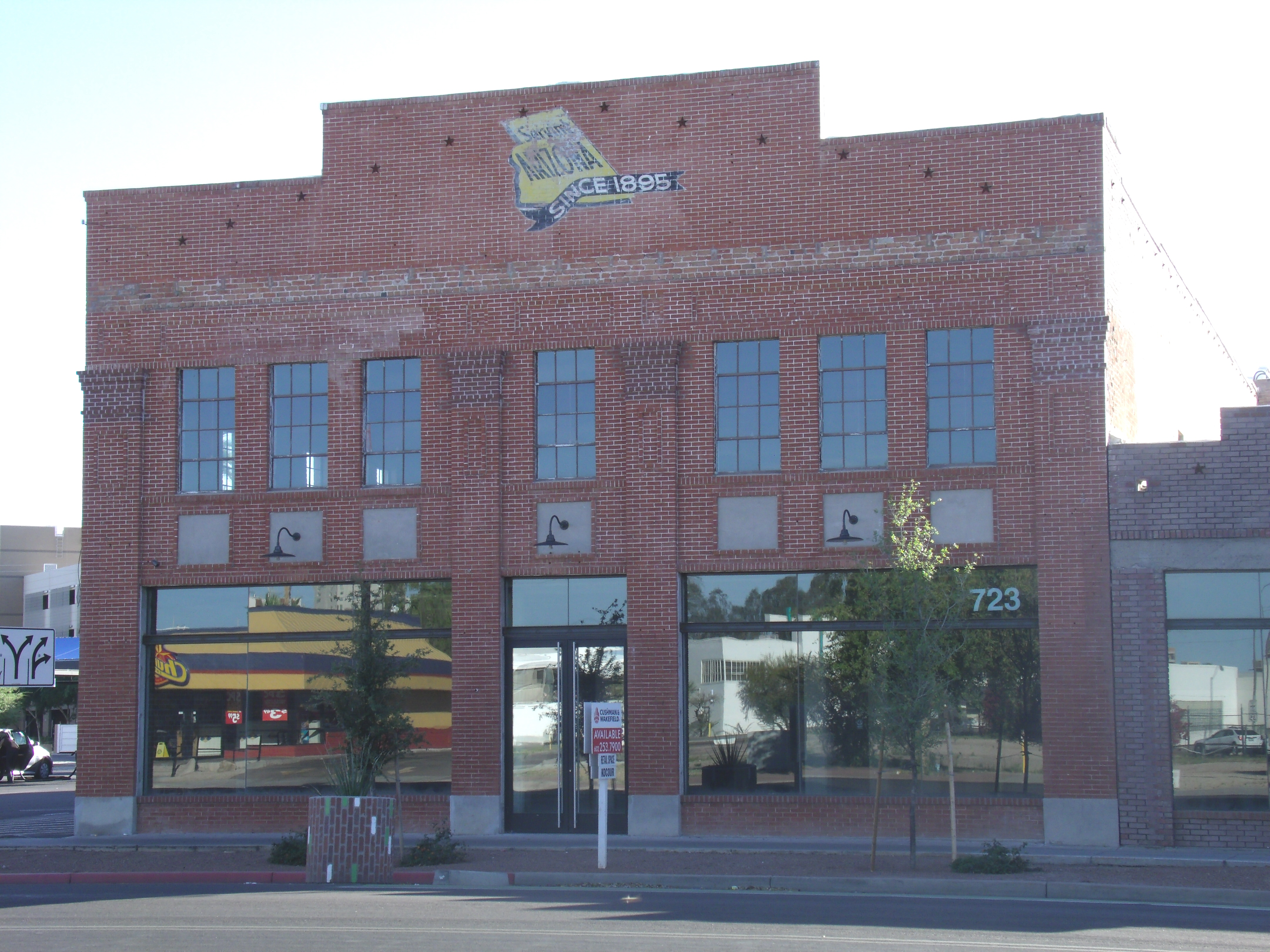
The Stapley (O.S.) Company Building was built in 1928 and is located at 723-735 Grand Avenue. The property was listed in the National Register of Historic Places in September 2012.

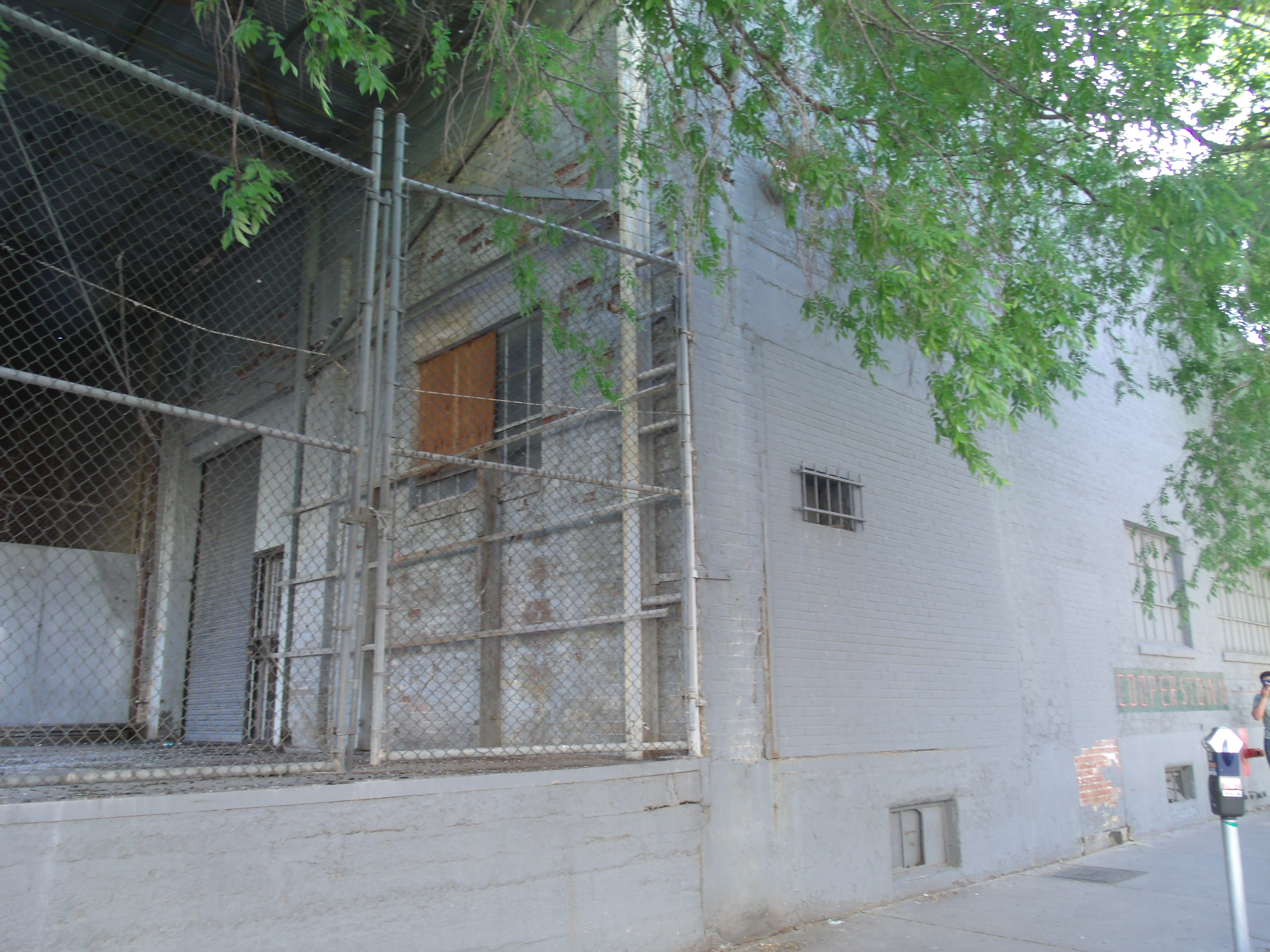
The Fuller (W.P.) Paint Company Warehouse was built in 1929 and is located at 117 E. Jackson St. The property was listed in the Phoenix Historic Property Register in July 2009.

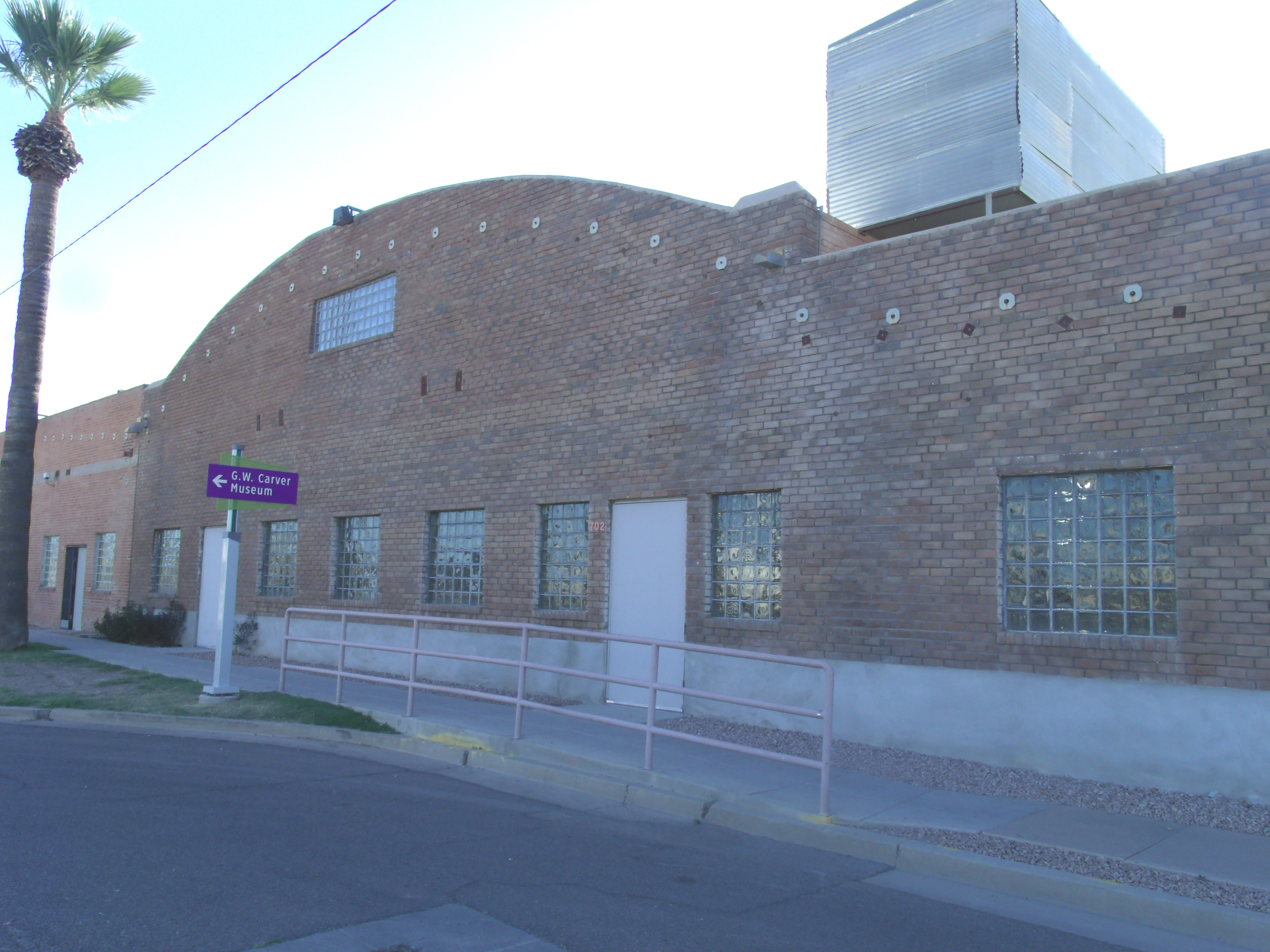
The Phoenix Linen & Towel Supply Company Warehouse was built in 1929 and is located at 702-706 S. Third St. / 215 E. Grant St. The property was listed in the Phoenix Historic Property Register in February 2010.

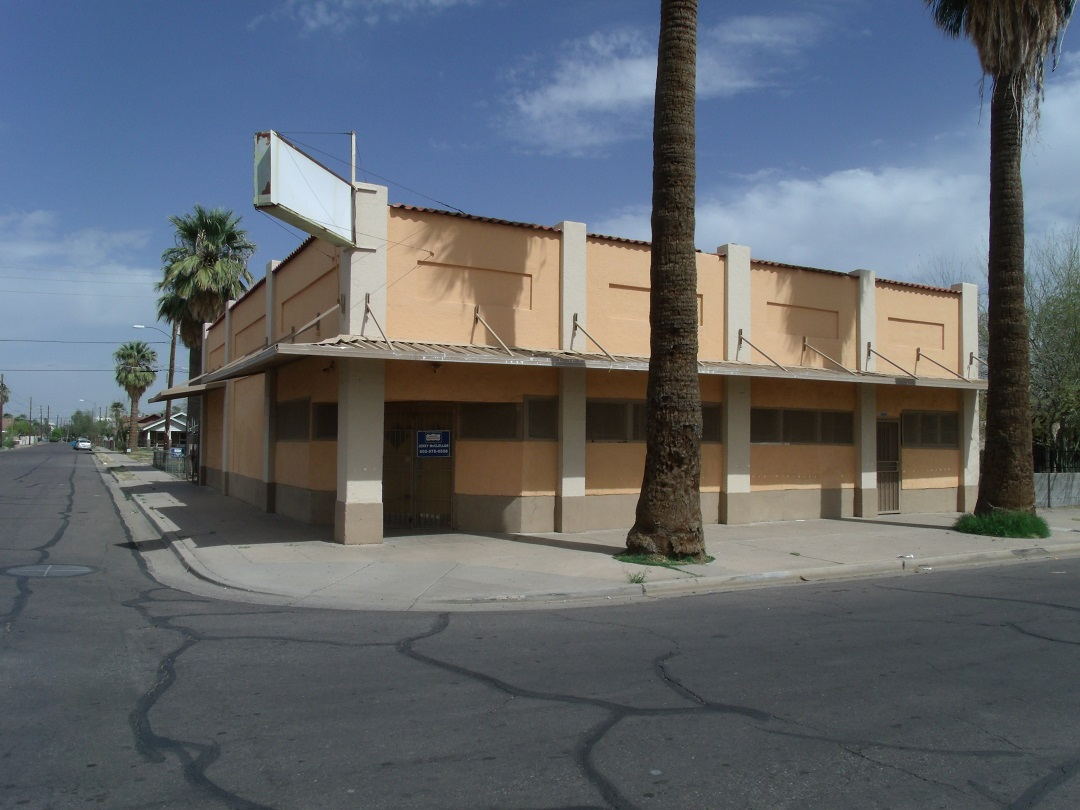
Brown's Pharmacy was built in 1929 and is located at 1000 E. Pierce Street. It was listed in the National Register of Historic Places on September 4, 1985, reference: #85002949.

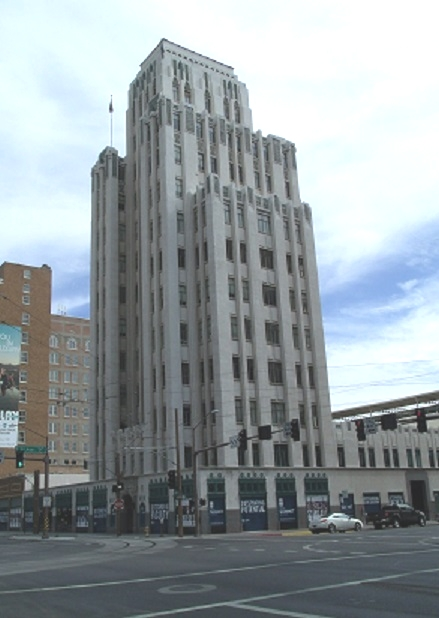
Luhrs Tower built in 1929 and located at 45 W. Jefferson St. The Luhrs Tower appeared in the background of a scene from the 1960 film Psycho in which the character Marion Crane (played by Janet Leigh) crossed the street with the deposit she was supposed to make for her boss. Listed in the National Register of Historic Places, reference: #85003559

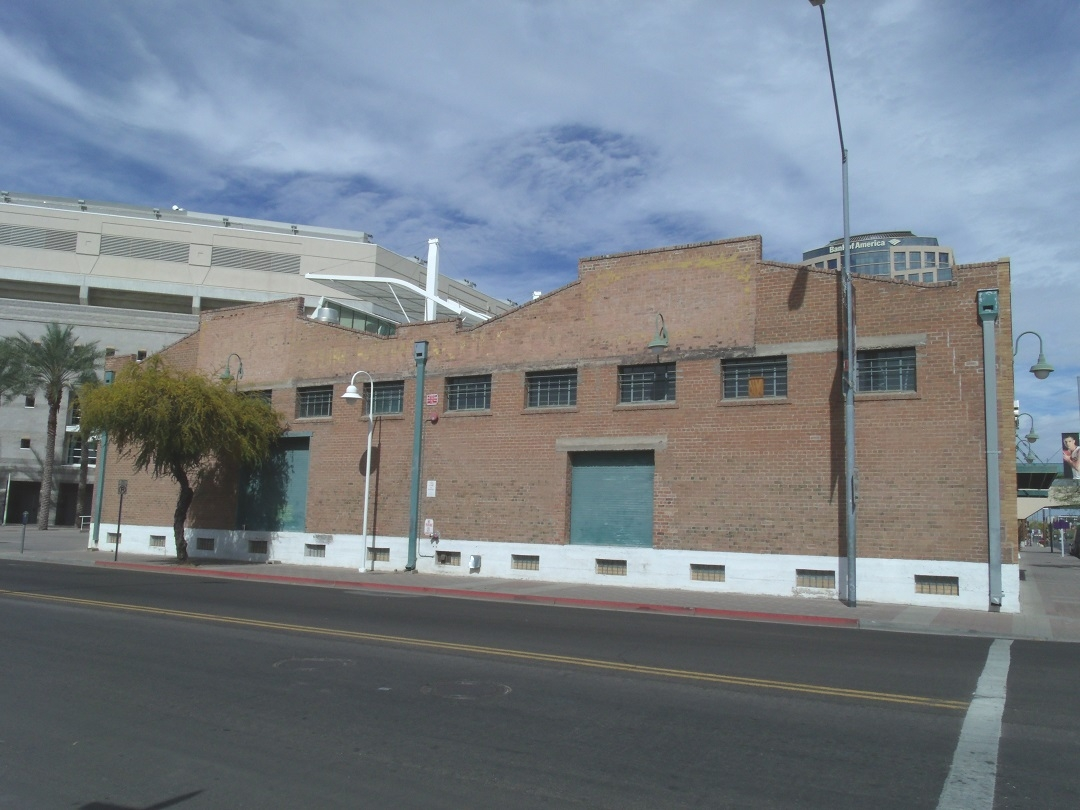
The Sun Mercantile Building was built in 1929 and is located at 232 S. 3rd Avenue. It is the last remaining warehouse in what was once Phoenix's Chinatown. Listed in the National Register of Historic Places, reference: #85003075.

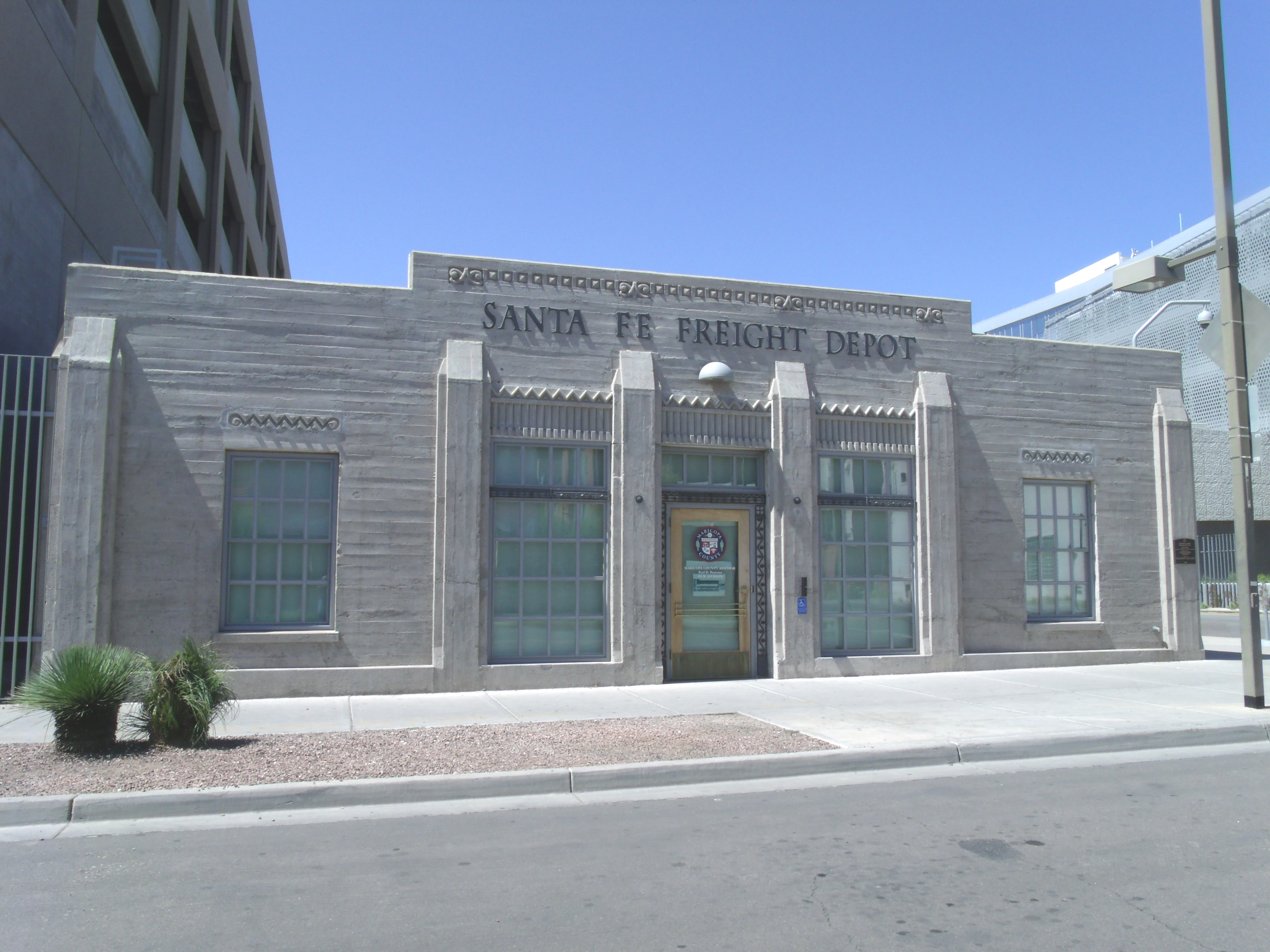
The Santa Fe Freight Depot was built in 1929 and is located at 5th Avenue and Jackson Street. Listed in the Phoenix Historic Property Register.

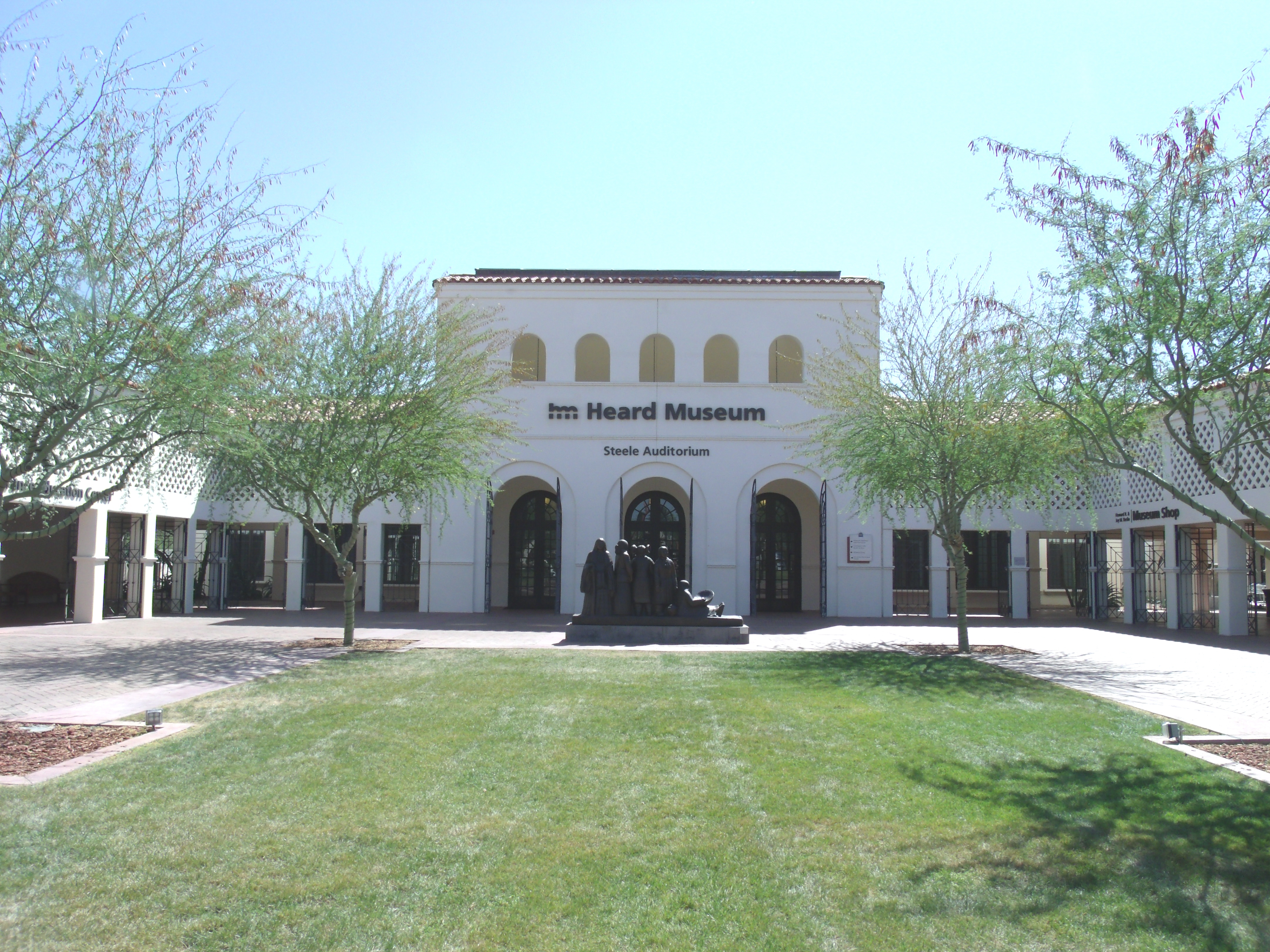
The front entrance of the Heard Museum building which was built in 1929 and is located at 2301 N. Central Avenue / 22 E. Monte Vista Road. It was listed in the Phoenix Historic Property Register in August 1992.

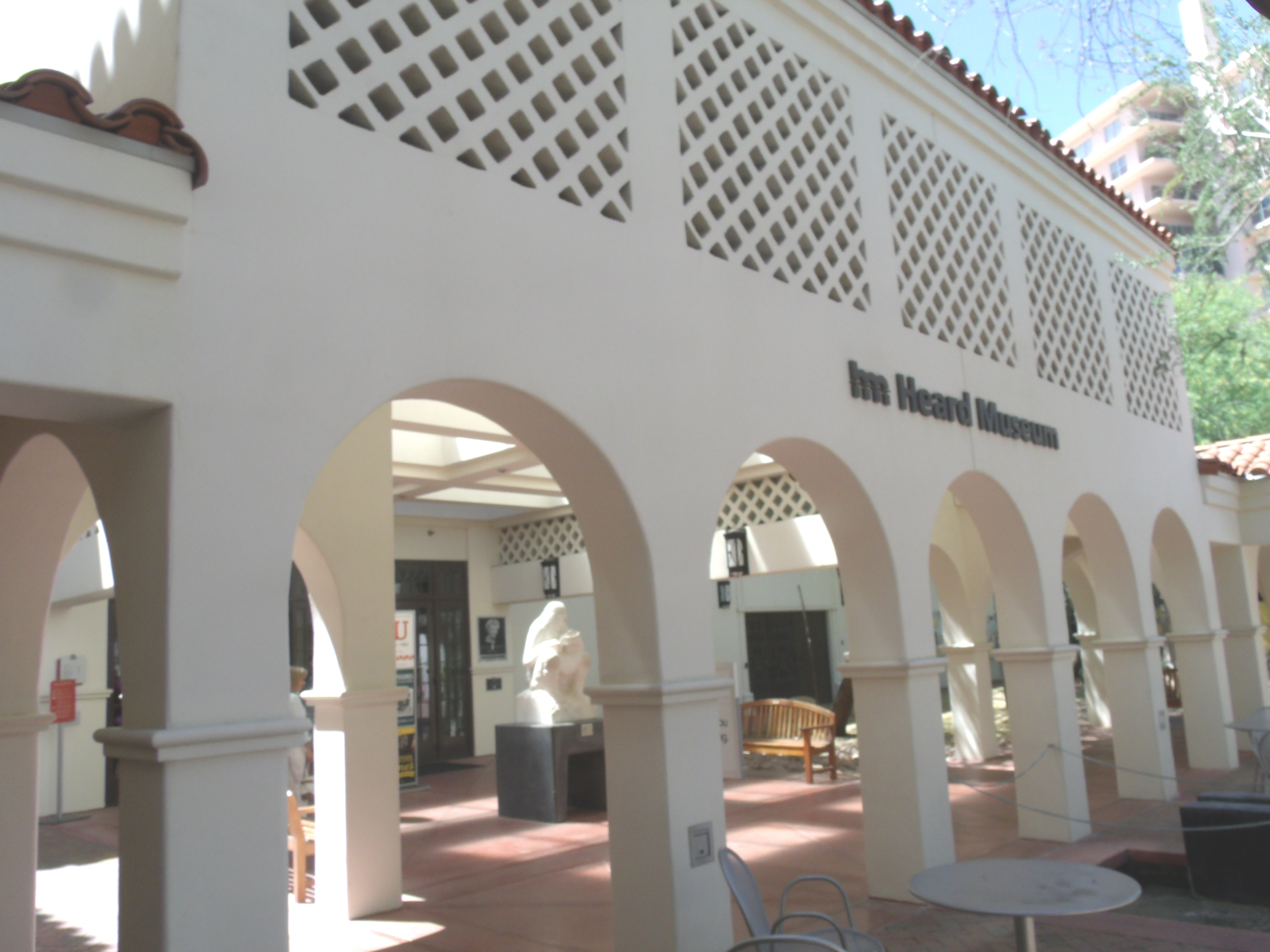
The Heard Museum building was built in 1929 and is located at 2301 N. Central Avenue / 22 E. Monte Vista Road. Maie Heard added quality artworks to the collection and worked closely with the board of trustees to direct the activities of the museum. She also oversaw the programming activities of the museum, approving speakers and insuring appropriate publicity was available. It was listed in the Phoenix Historic Property Register in August 1992.

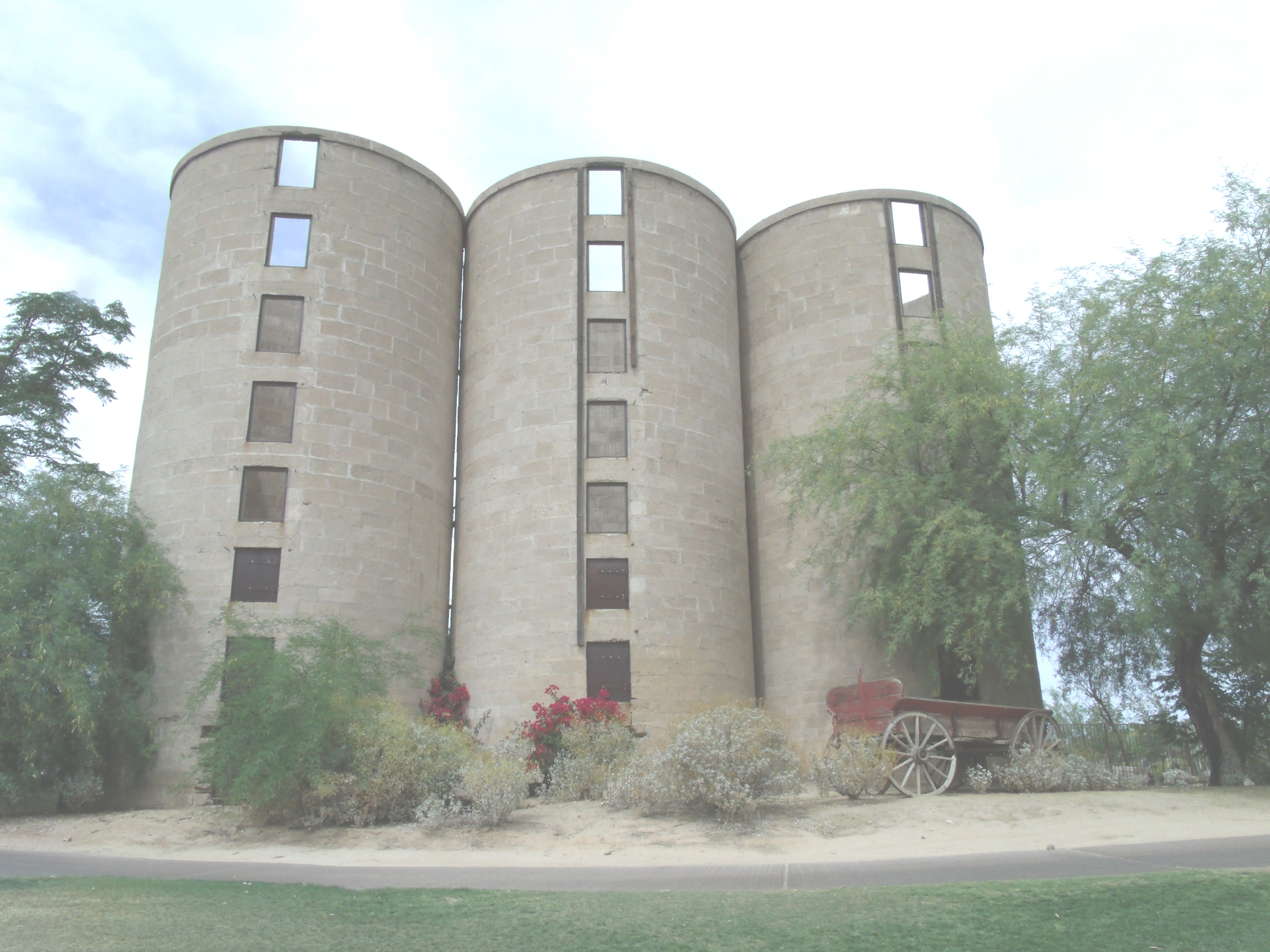
The Heard Ranch Grain Silos were built in 1930 and are located within the golf course of the Legacy Resort in the vicinity of 30th Street and Vineyard Road. The ranch belonged to businessman Dwight B. Heard, who is given much of the credit for the Arizona Republic newspaper (of which he was publisher), the Heard Museum and the development of the vital irrigation canals and the Arizona cattle industry. The property was listed in the Phoenix Historic Property Register in March 1993.

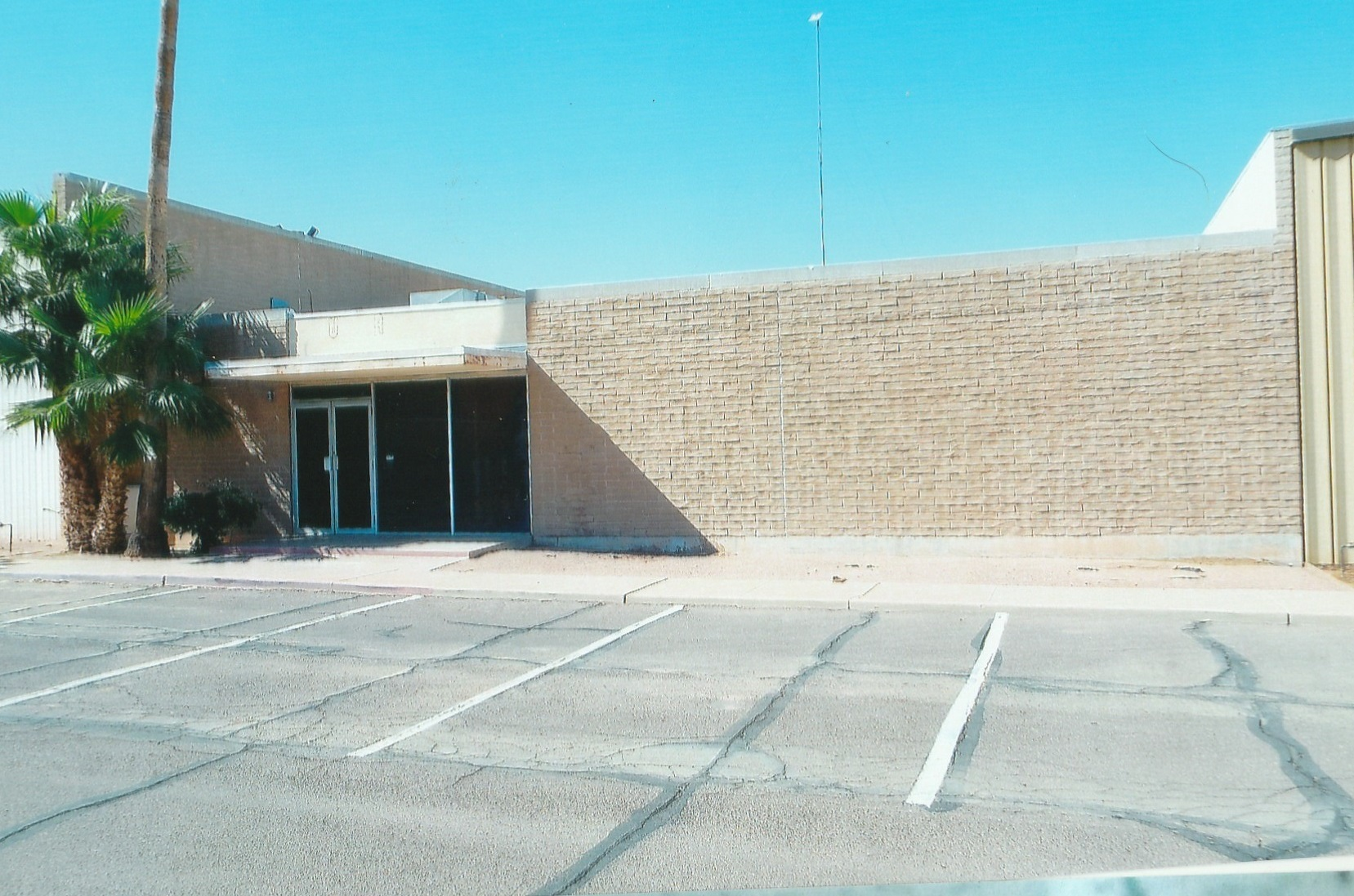
In the 1930s this was a Phoenix Airport hangar and terminal where in 1933, Ruth Reinhold became the first female pilot in Arizona.

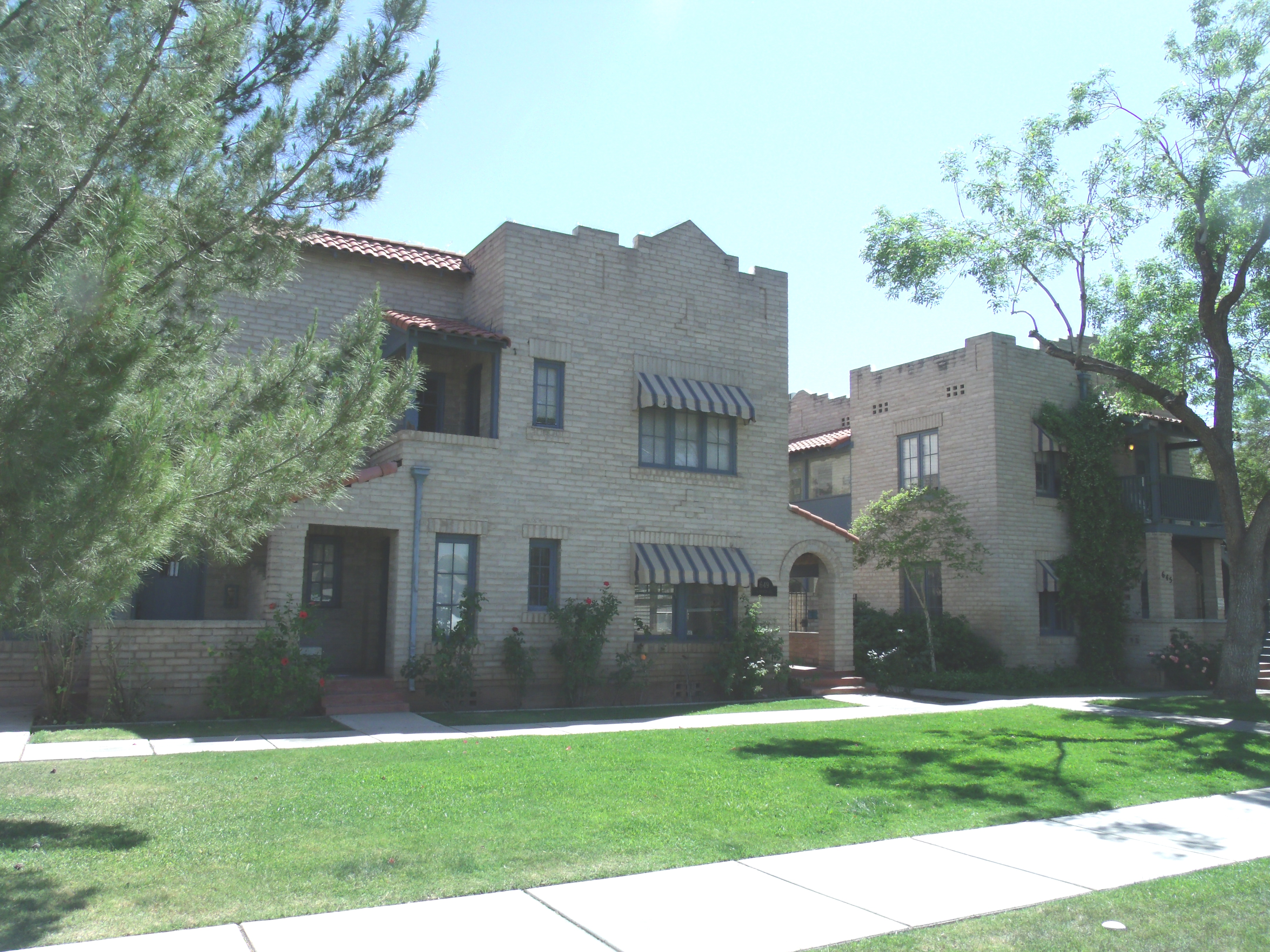
The Greystone Apartments was built in 1930 and is located at 645-649 N. Fourth Avenue. It was listed in the Phoenix Historic Property Register in September 1986.

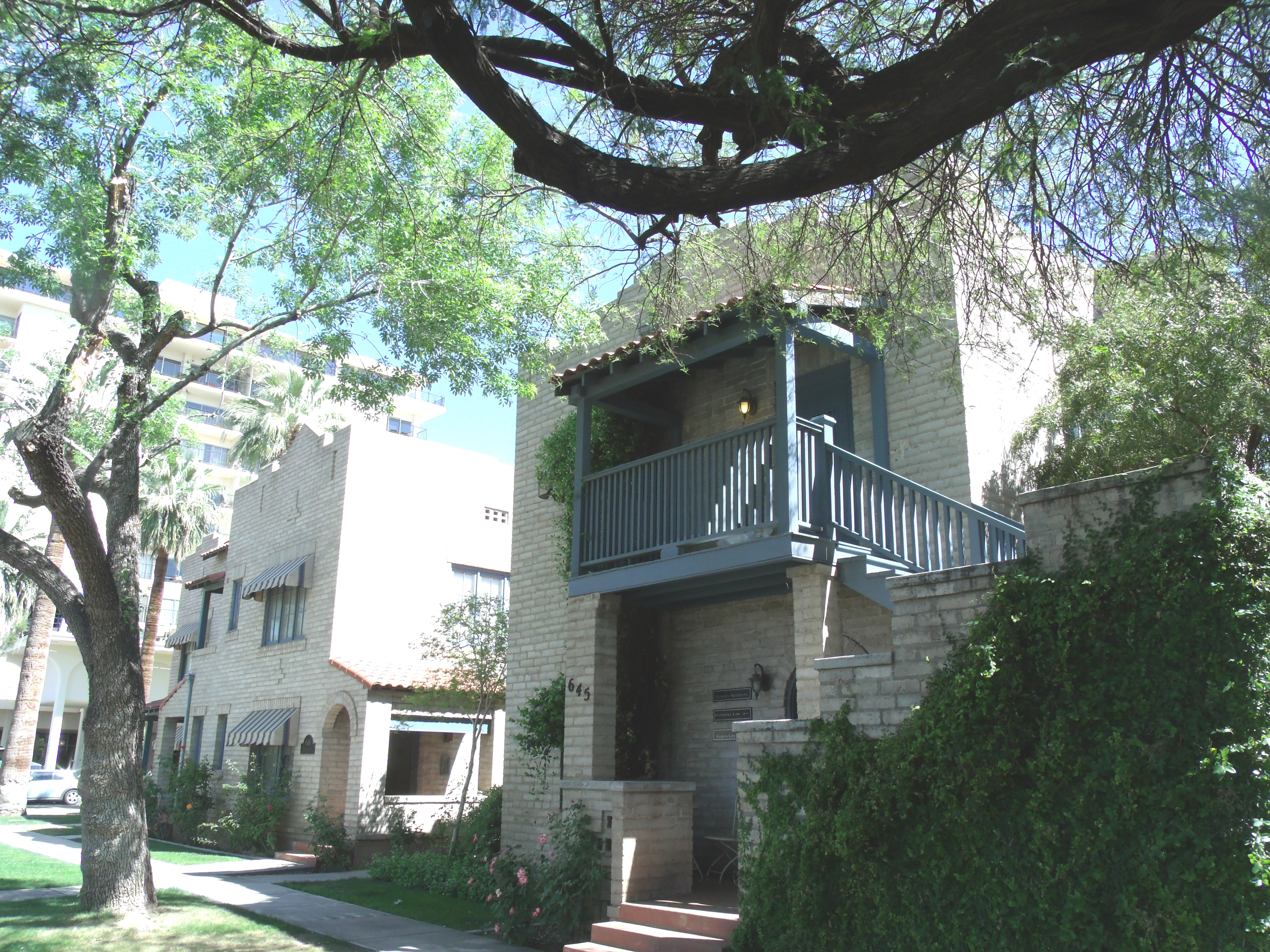
Different view of the Greystone Apartments which were built in 1930 and is located at 645-649 N. Fourth Avenue. It was listed in the Phoenix Historic Property Register in September 1986.

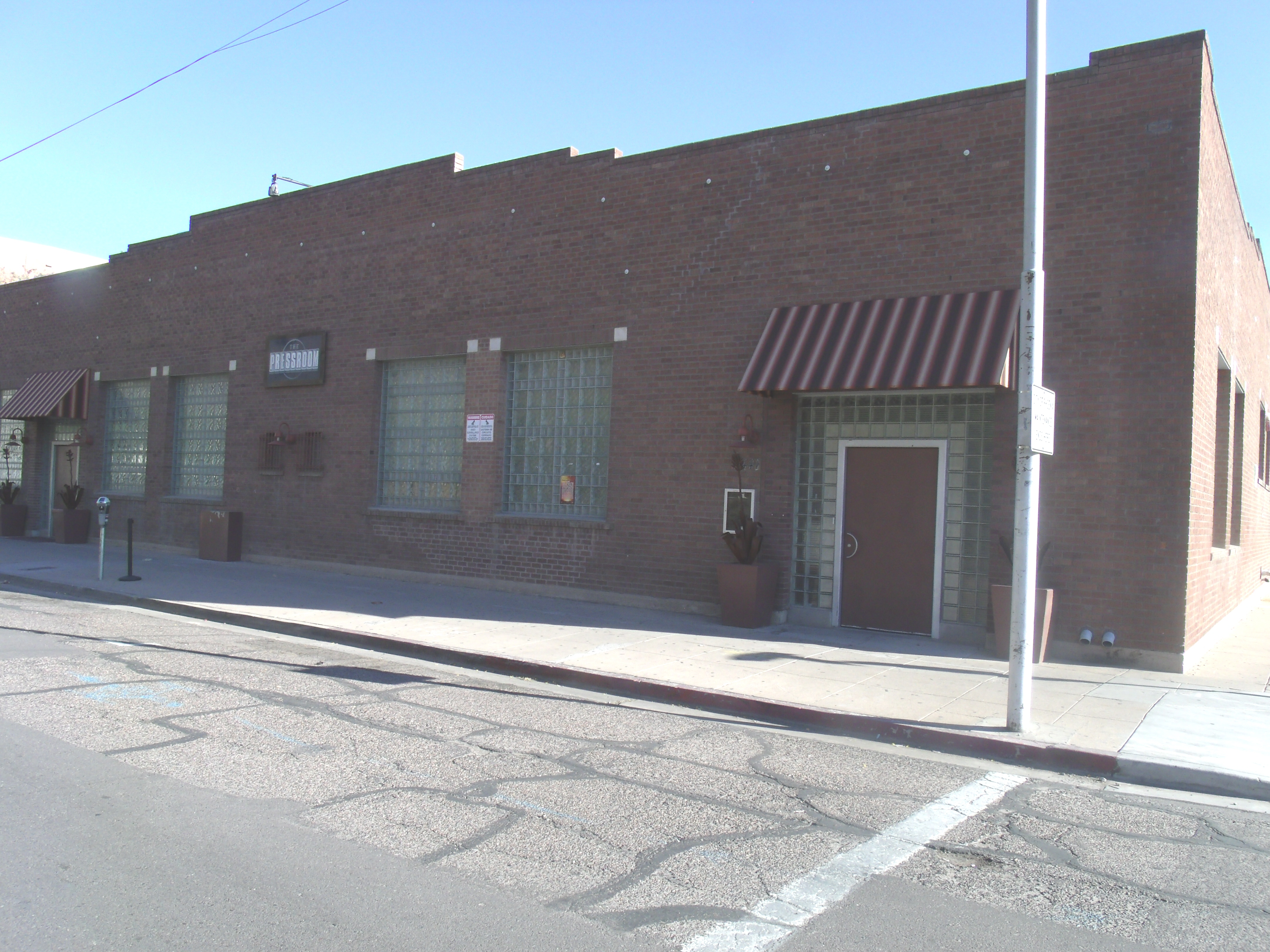
The General Electric Supply Warehouse was built in 1930 and is located at 435-441 W. Madison St. The property was listed in the Phoenix Historic Property Register in July 2000.

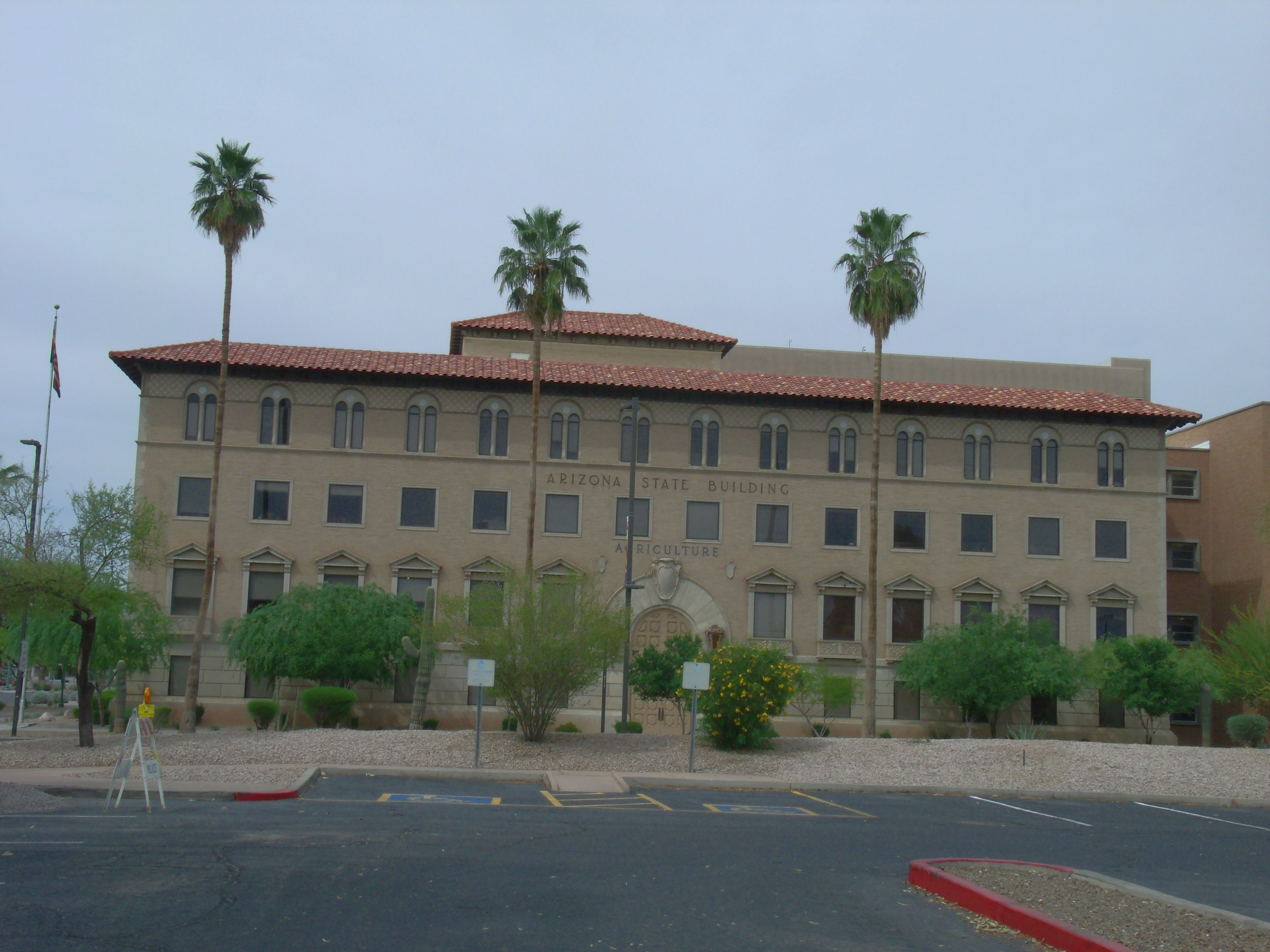
Department of Agriculture Building built in 1930 and located at 1688 West Adams. Listed in the Phoenix Historic Property Register.

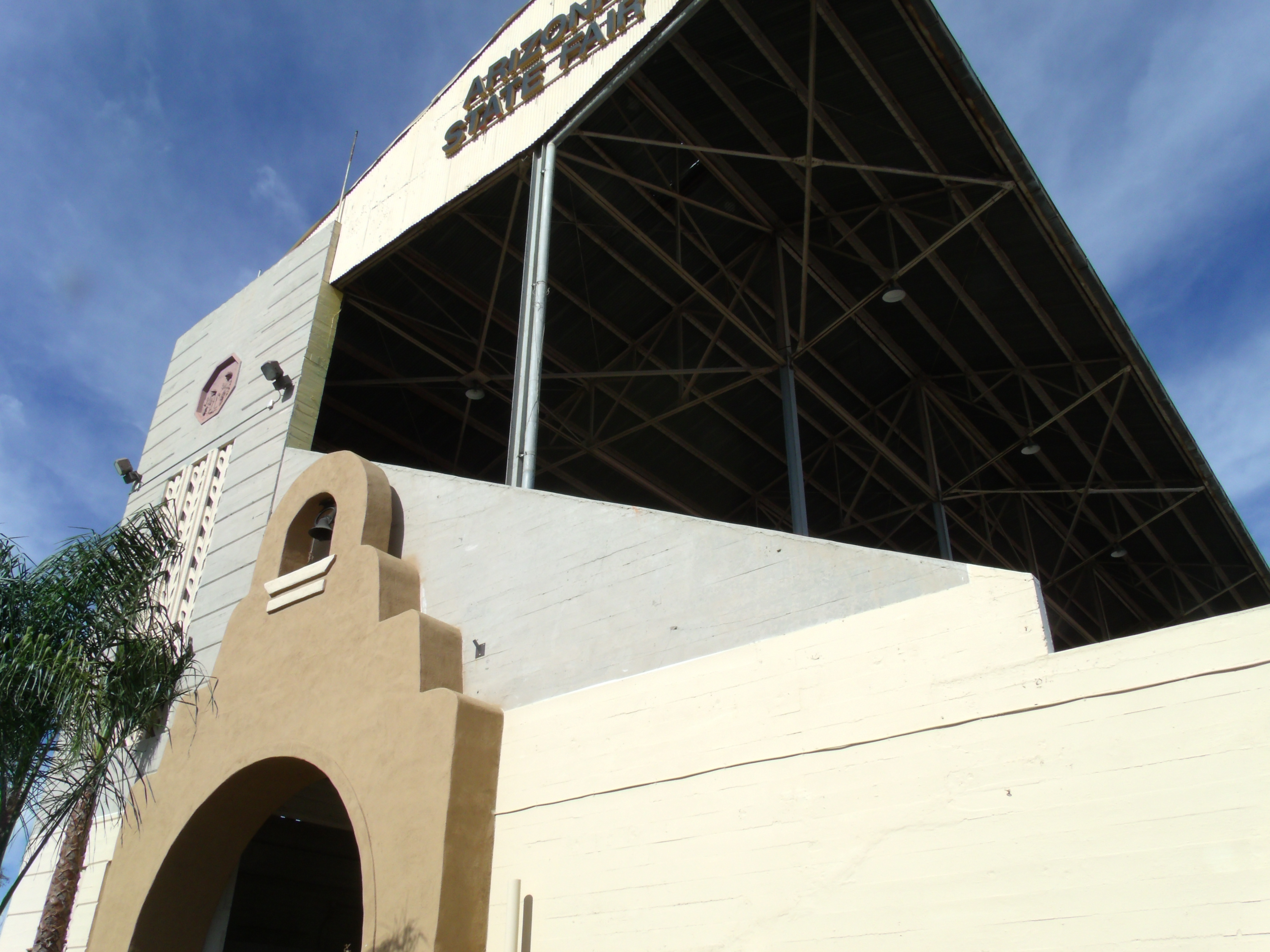
The Arizona State Fair Grandstand was built in the early 1900s and is located at 1826 West McDowell Road.

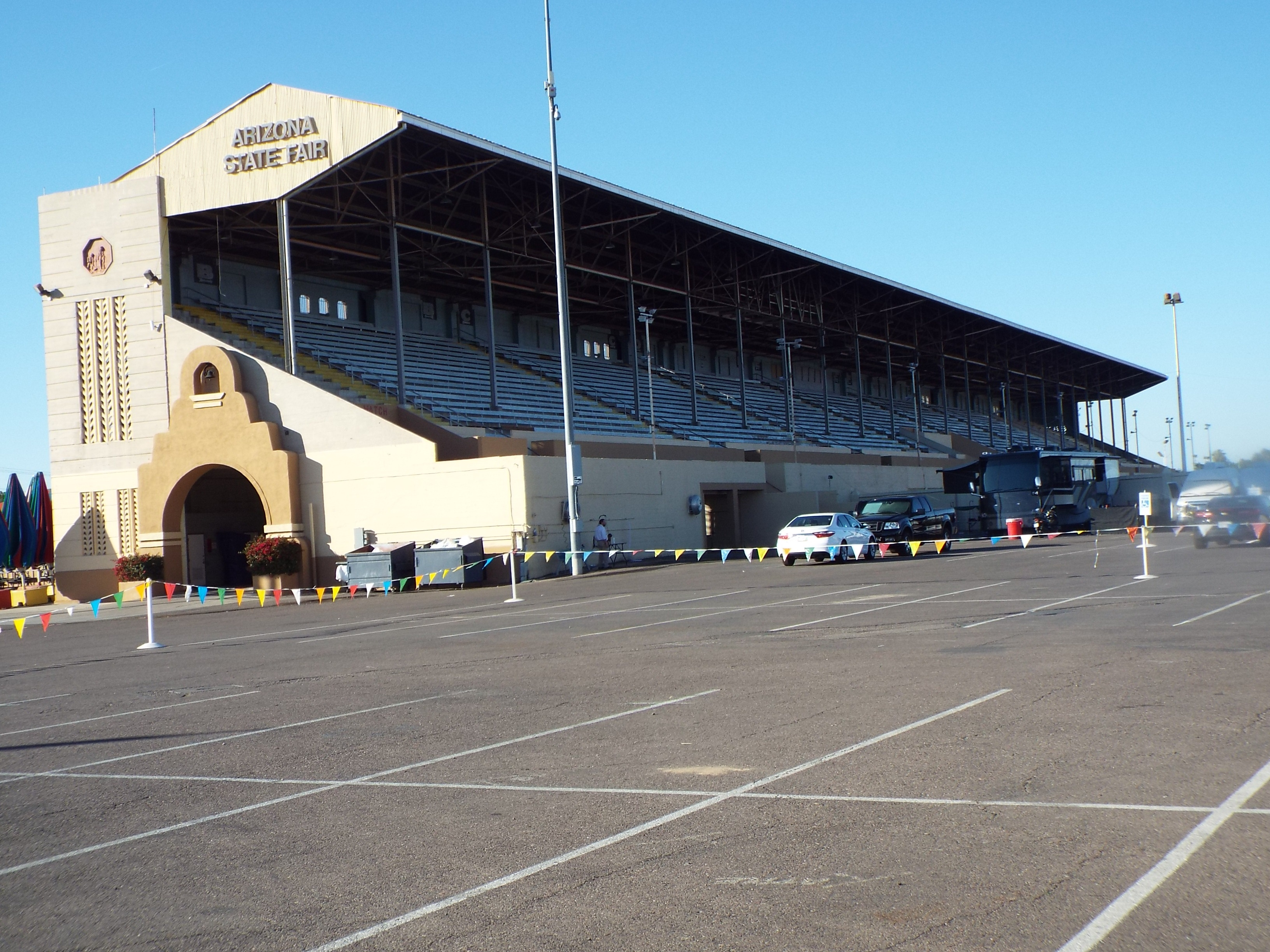
Different view of the Arizona State Fair Grandstand which was built in the early 1900s and is located at 1826 West McDowell Road.

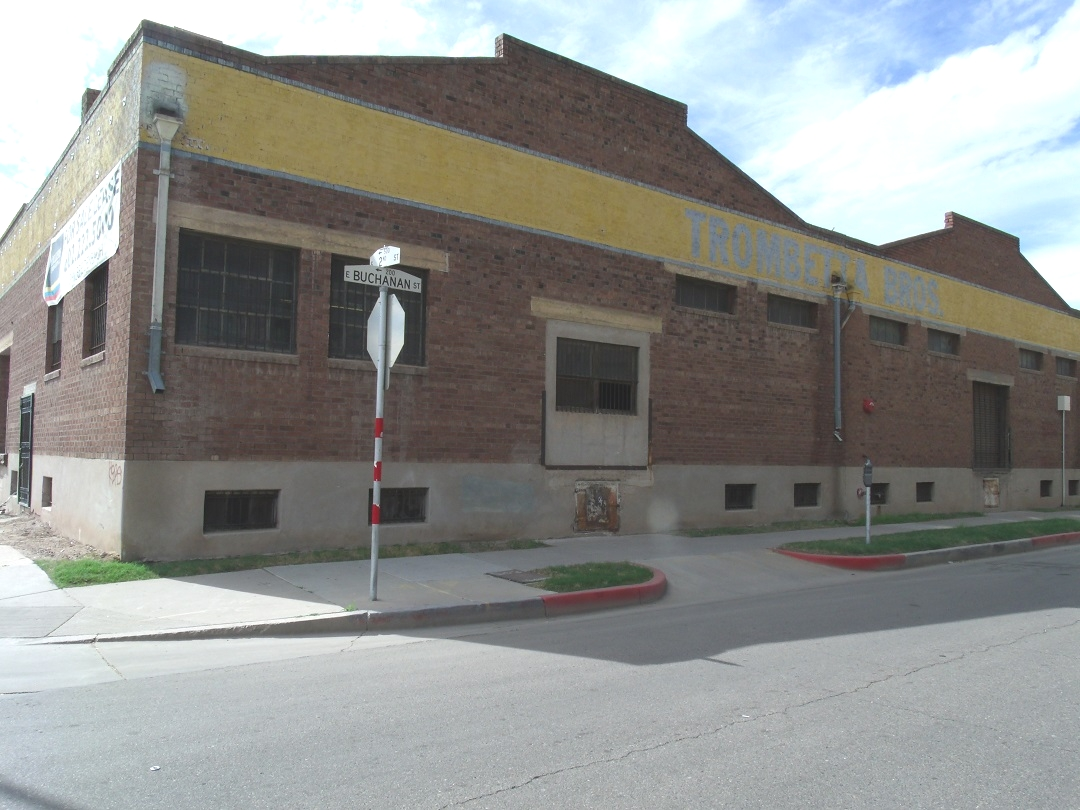
The Ong Yut Geong Market Warehouse was built in 1930 and is located at 502 S. 2nd. St. Listed in the National Register of Historic Places, reference: #86002066 (NRHP).

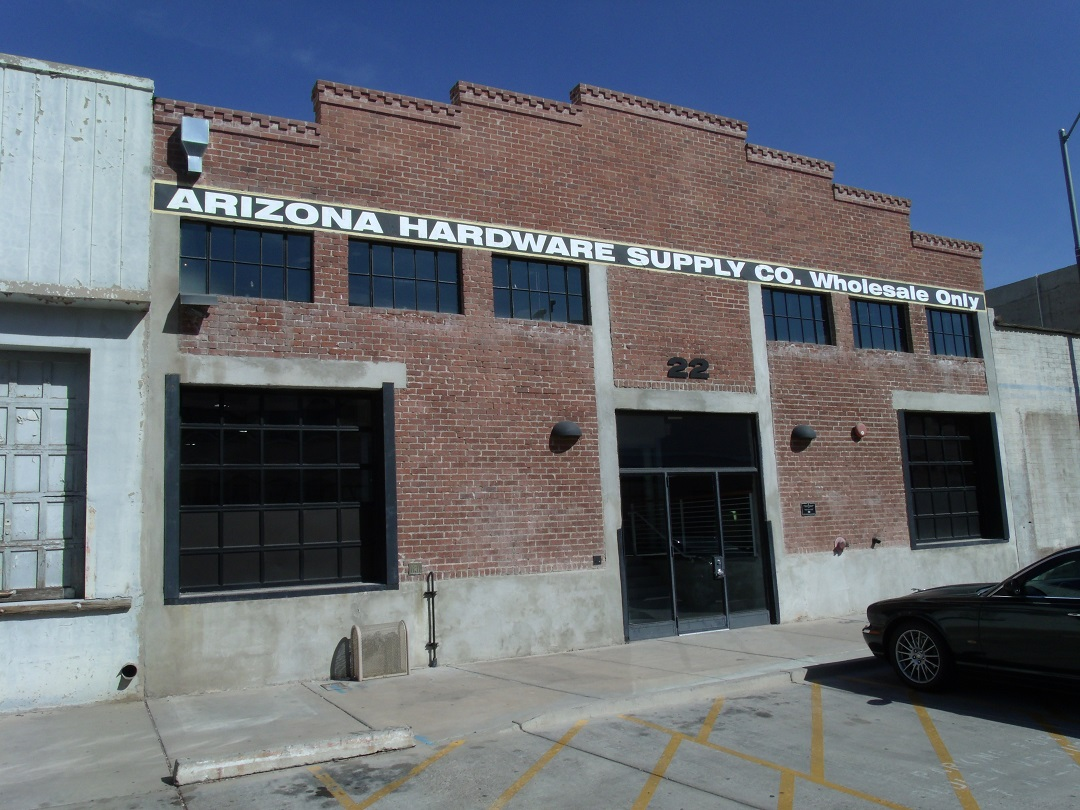
Arizona Hardware Supply Company Warehouse was built in 1930 and is located at 22 E. Jackson St. Designated as a landmark with Historic Preservation-Landmark (HP-L) overlay zoning. Listed in the Phoenix Historic Property Register.

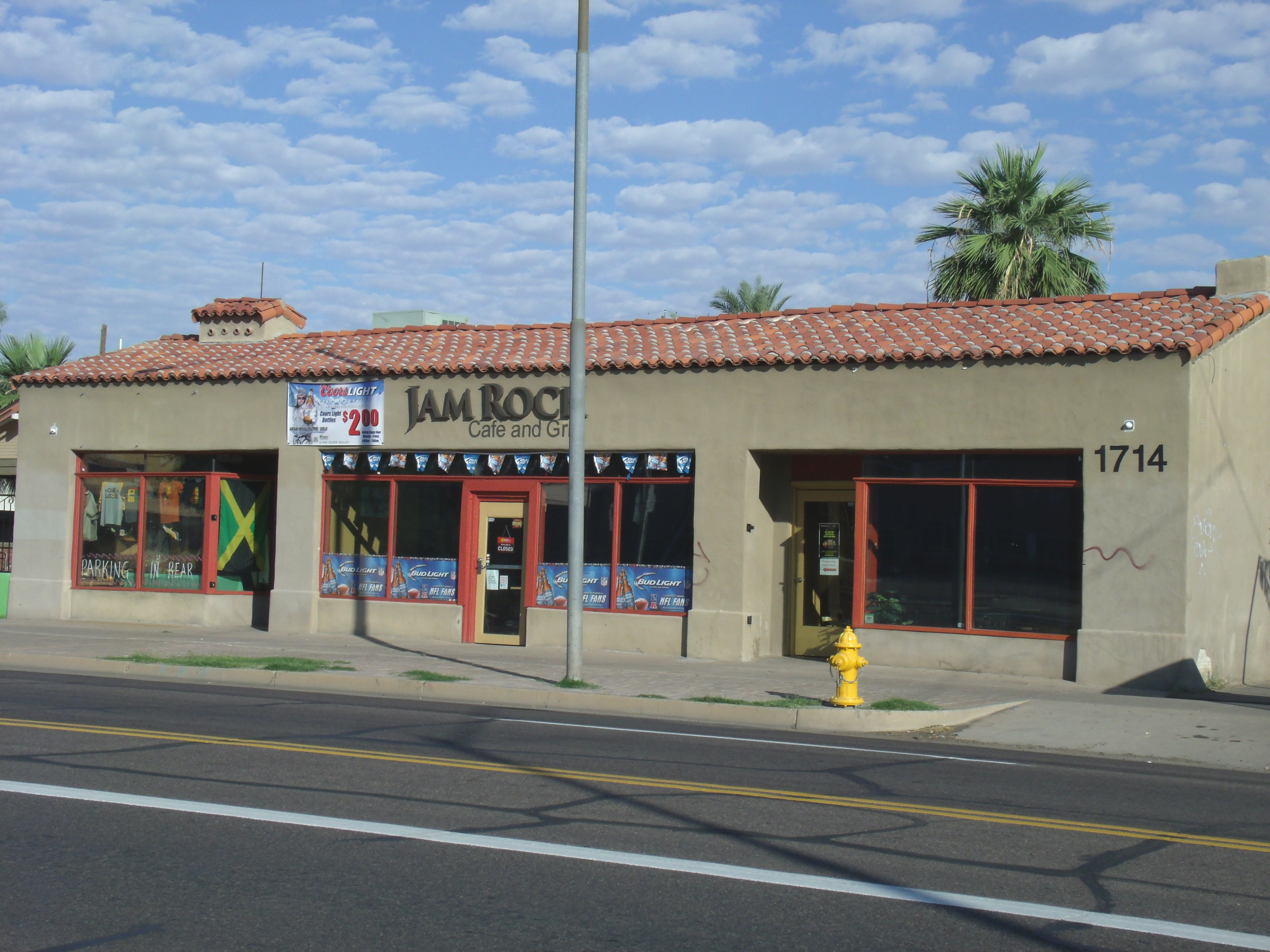
The Bobby Brown Café building was built in 1930 and is located at 1714-18 W. Van Buren Avenue. This property was listed in the Phoenix Historic Property Register.

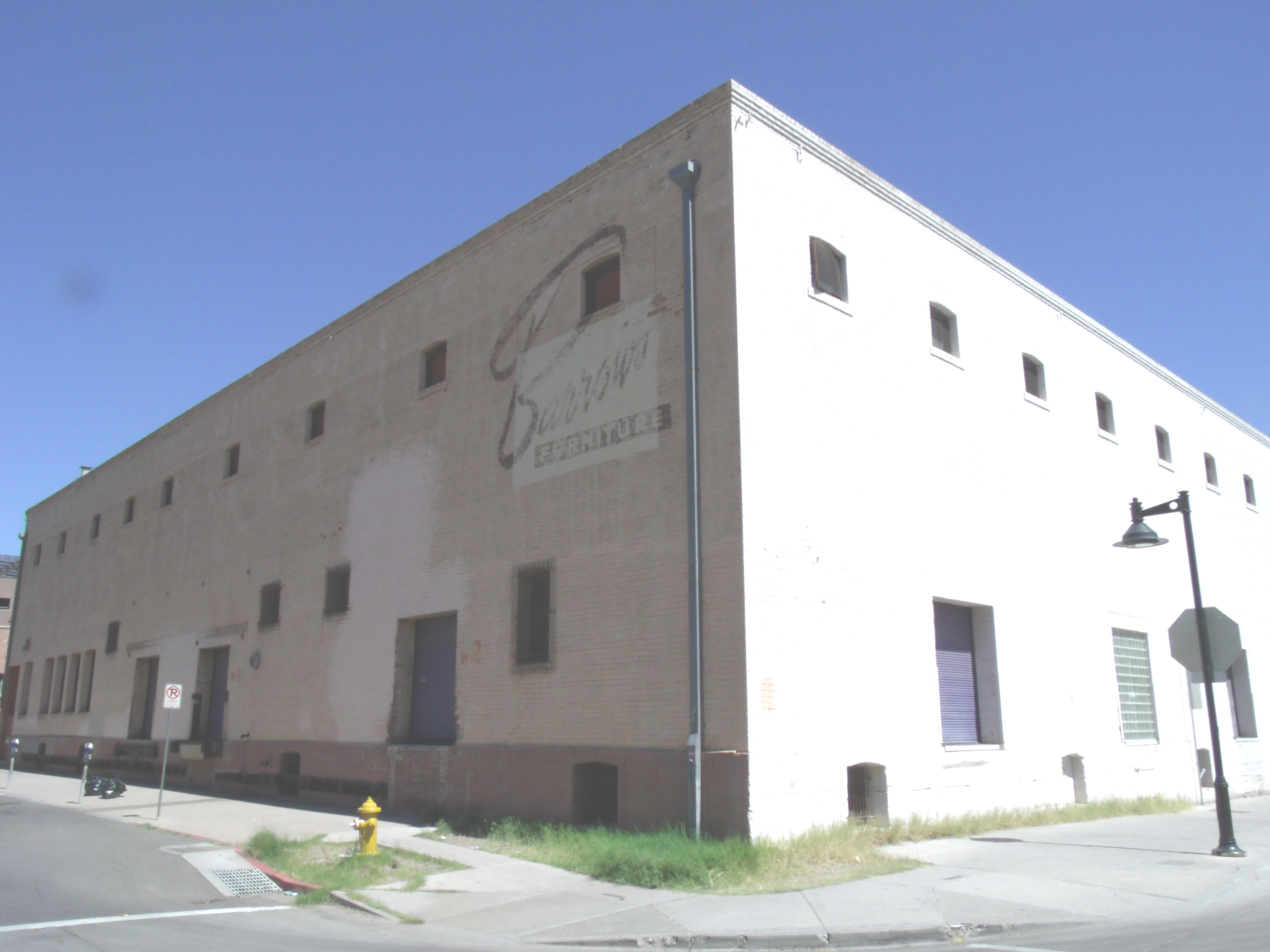
The Wakelin (E.S.) Grocery Company Warehouse was built in 1930 and is located in the corner of 219 S. Fifth Avenue / 440 W. Jackson St. It was listed in the Phoenix Historic Property Register in July 2000.

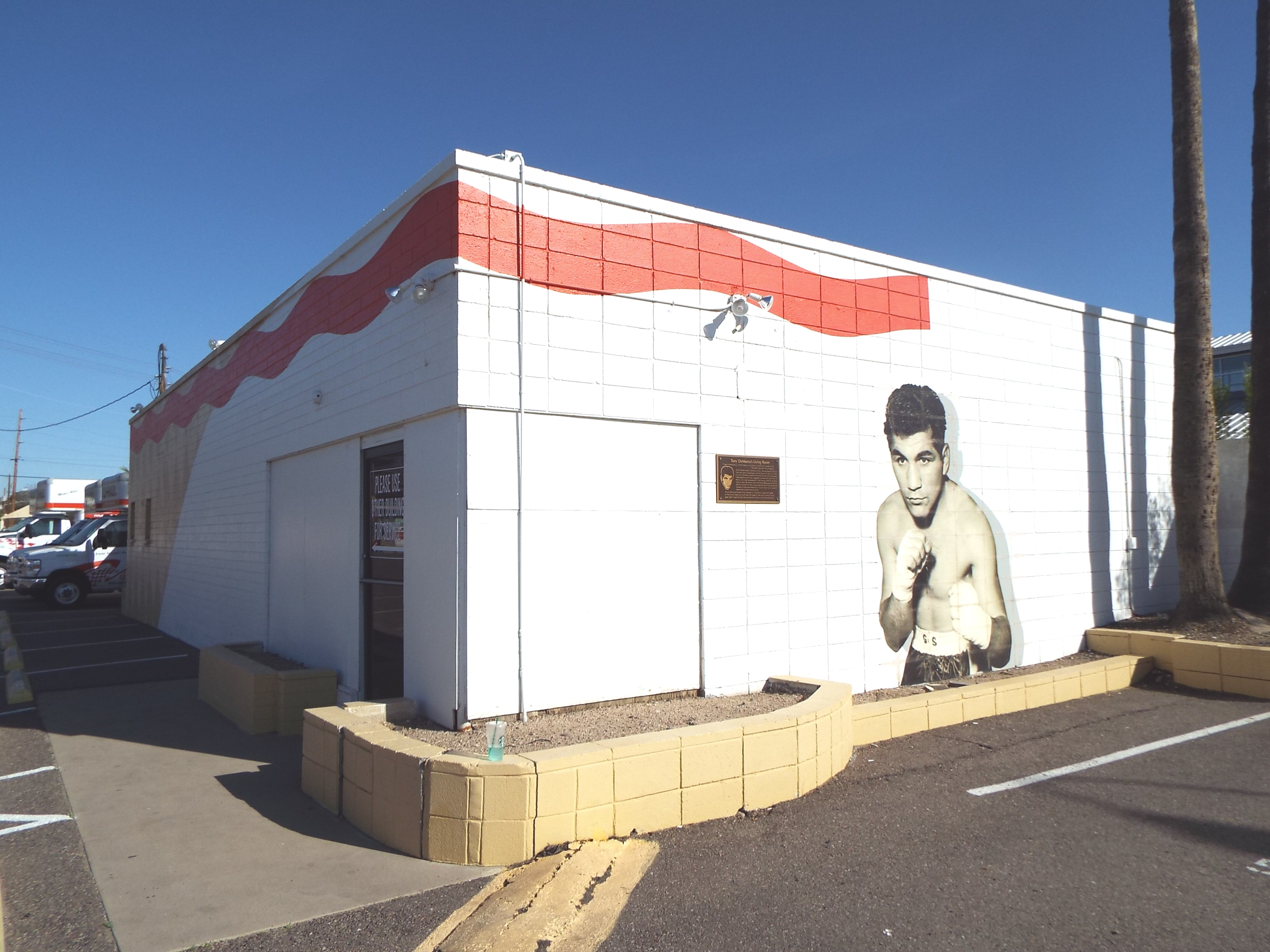
This location which once housed the Living Room Lounge was built in 1930 and is located at 4007 E. Camelback Road in Phoenix. The building housed the Silver Poodle Cocktail Lounge prior to 1968, when boxing welterweight Tony DeMarco became the owner of the property and established what he called the Living Room Lounge. DeMarco no longer owns the property which now belongs to the U-Haul Co.

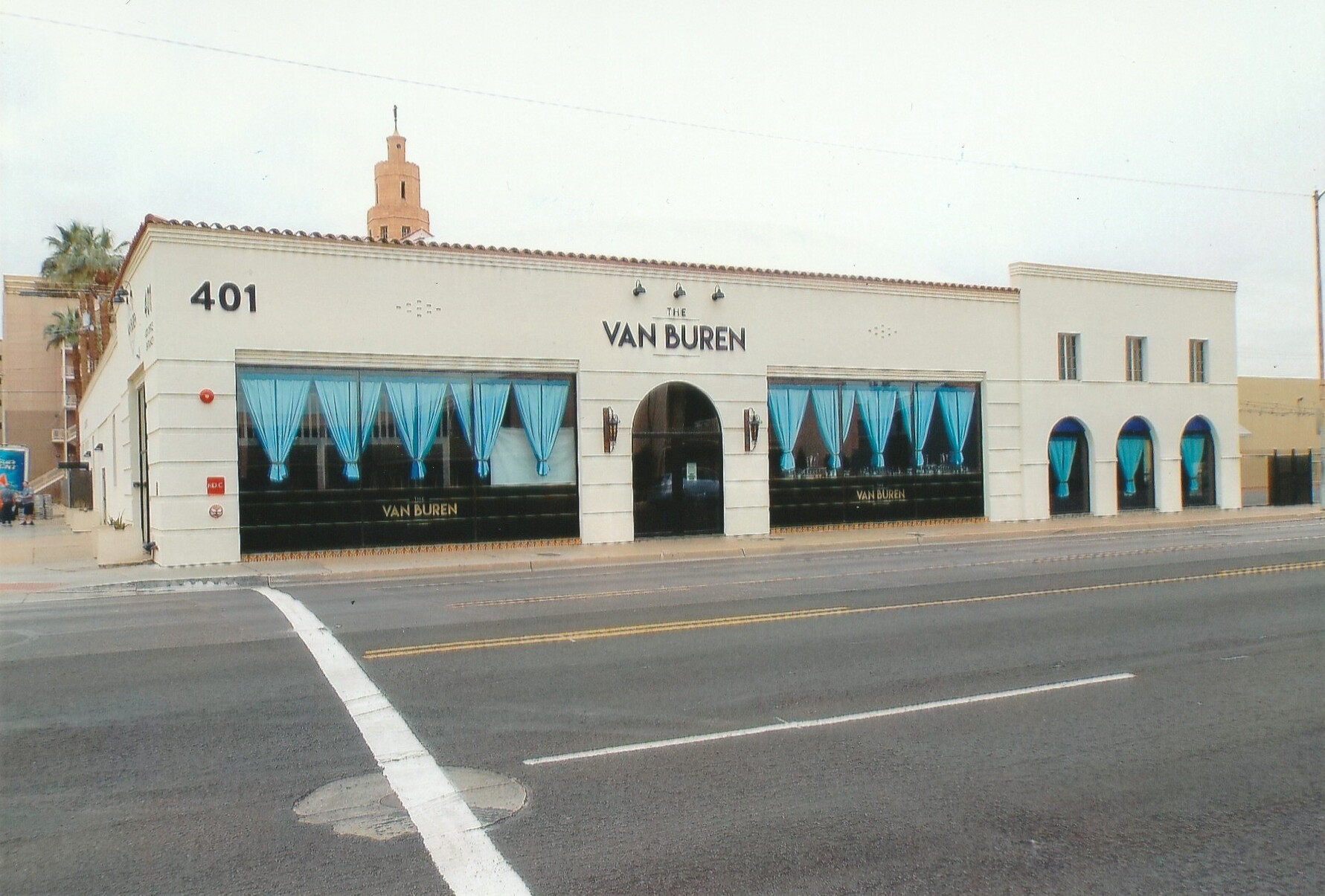
The Day (Dud R.) Motor Company/Phoenix Motor Company building was built in 1930 and is located at 401 West Van Buren Street. Today it is home to The Van Buren. It was listed in the Phoenix Historic Property Register in May 2017.

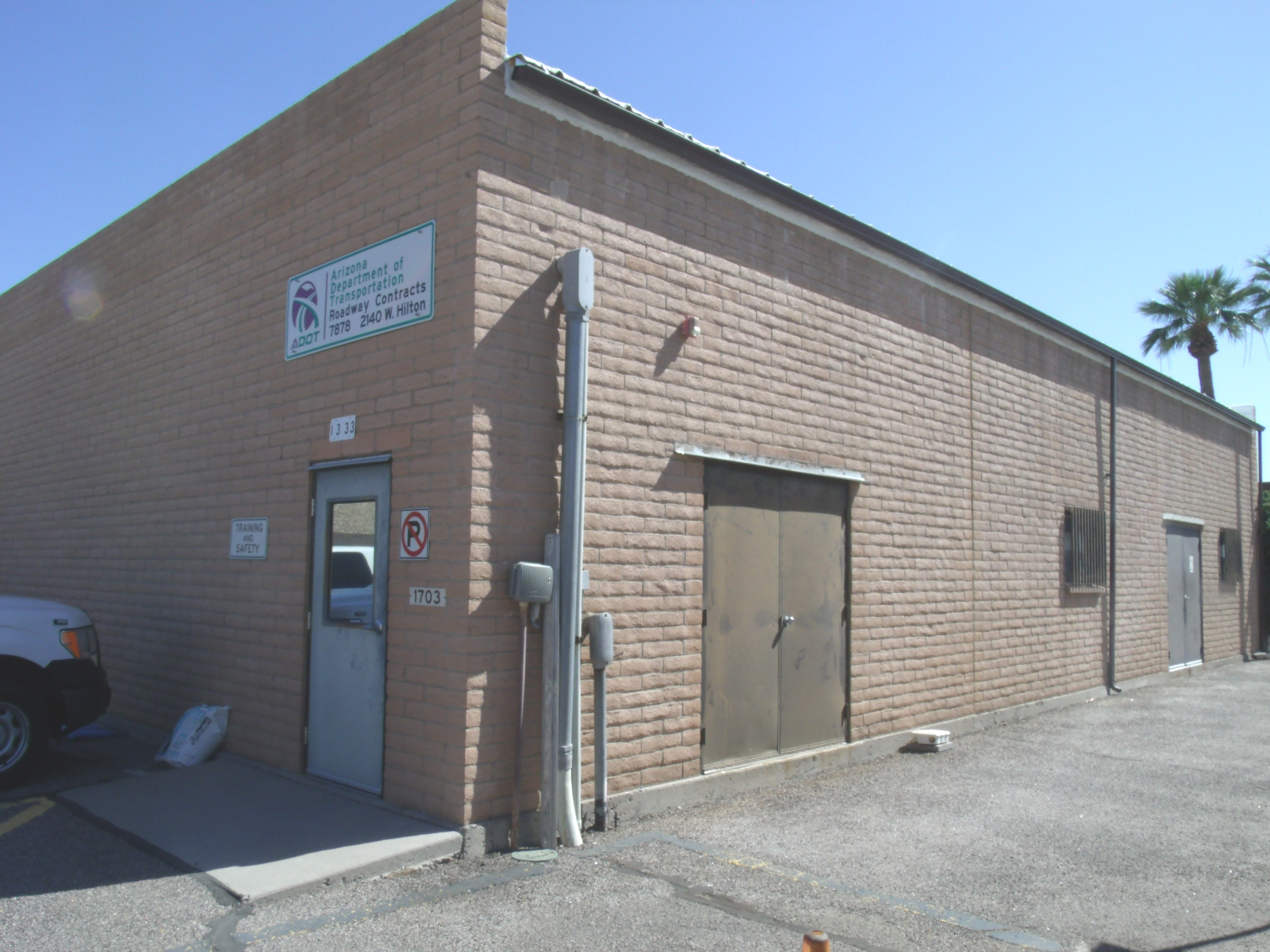
The Wastewater Treatment Plant Control Building was built in 1931 and is located at 2301 W. Durango St. The structure is now within the confines of the Arizona Department of Transportation District whose address is 2140 W. Hilton. It was listed in the Phoenix Historic Property Register in October 1992.

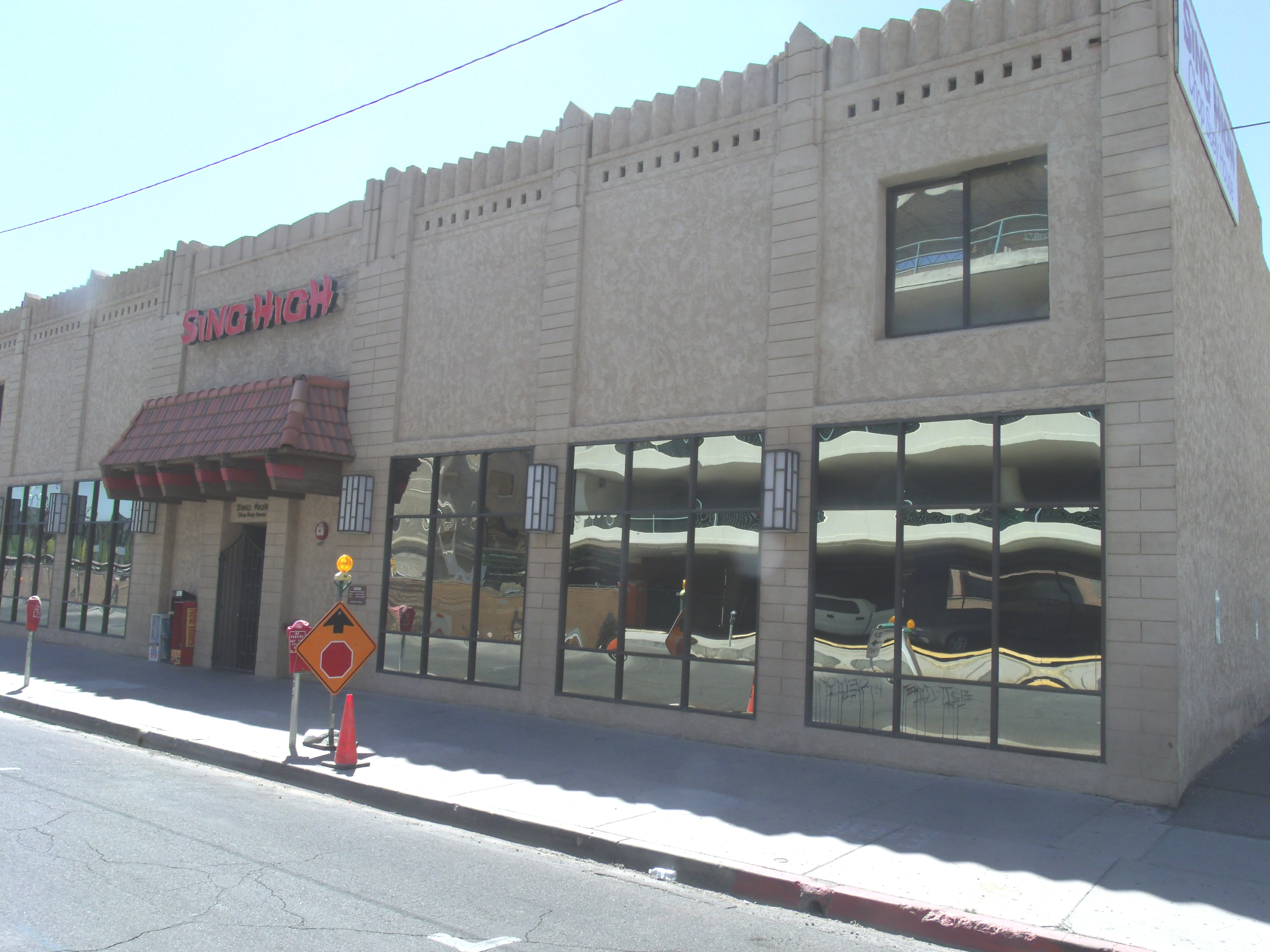
The Stag Hotel / Patio Hotel was built in 1931 and is located at 27 W. Madison St. It now houses a Chinese Restaurant. It was listed in the Phoenix Historic Property Register in October 2001.

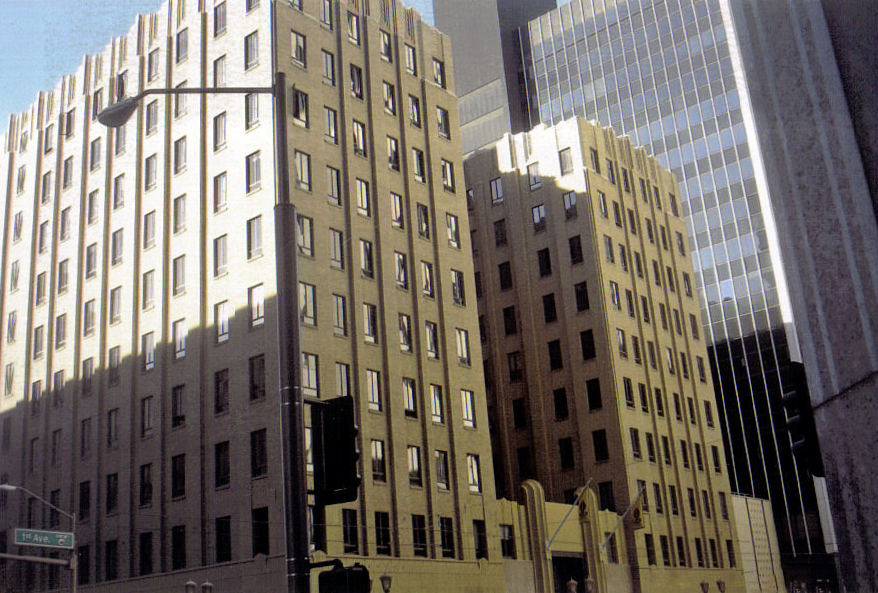
The "U" shaped Phoenix Title and Trust Towers were built in 1931 and are located at 112 N. 1st. Avenue. The towers were listed in the National Register of Historic Places on September 4, 1985, reference: #85002076.

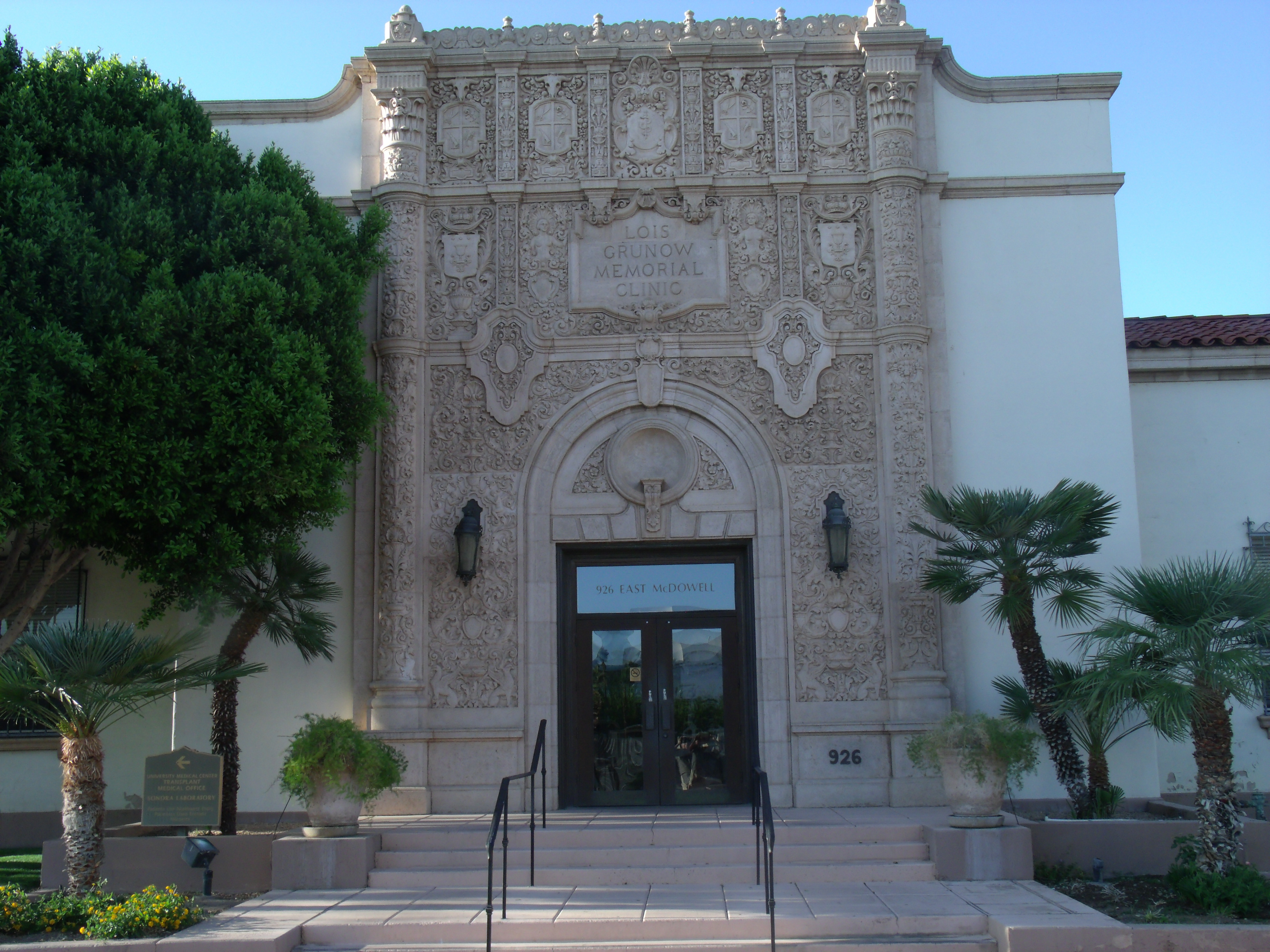
Entrance of the Lois Grunow Memorial Clinic, built in 1931 and located at 926 E. McDowell Rd. On September 4, 1985, the property was listed in the National Register of Historic Places, reference: #85002065.

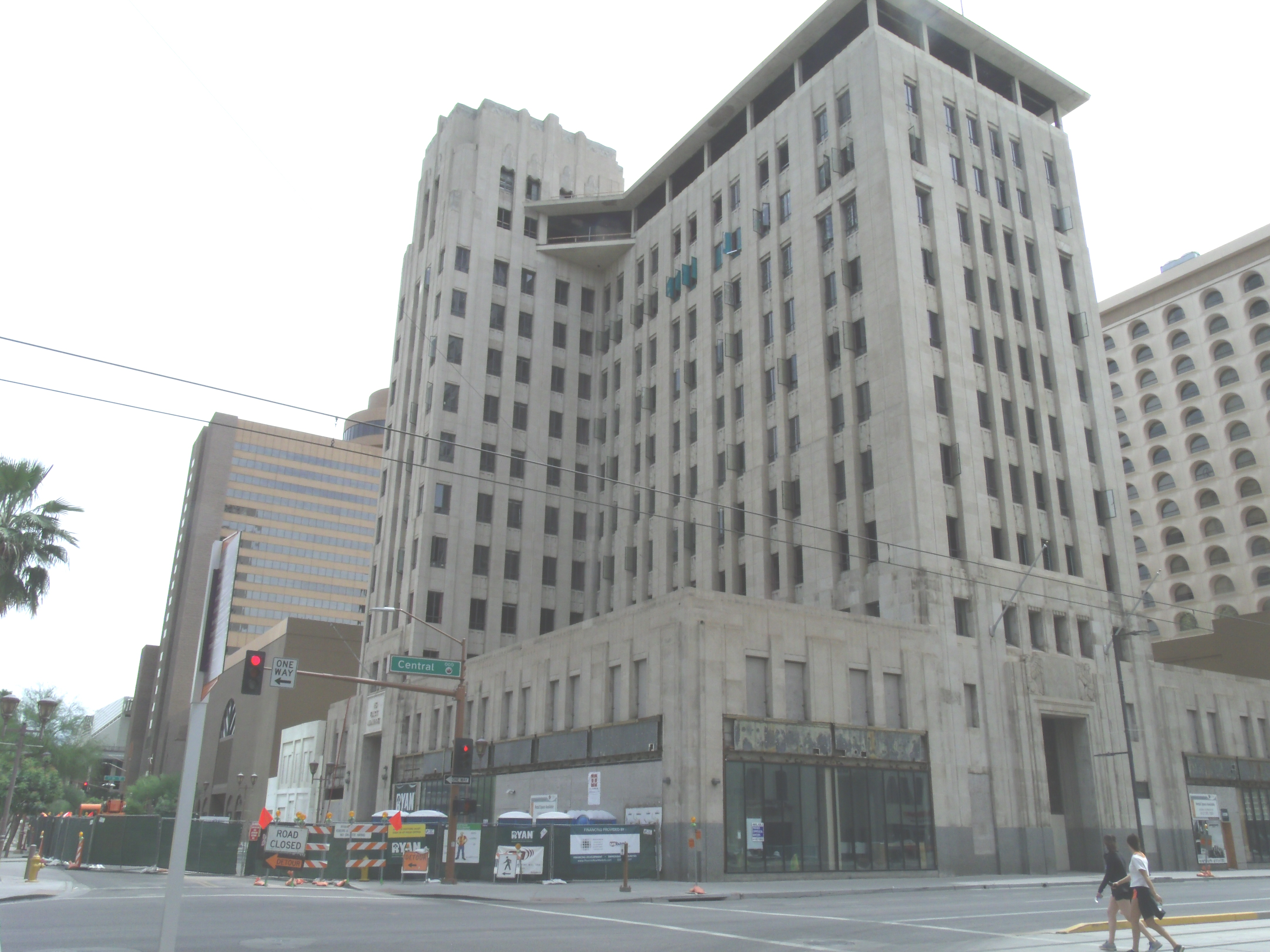
The Professional Building built in 1931 and located at 137 N. Central Avenue. It was listed in the National Register of Historic Places in 1993, reference: #85003563.

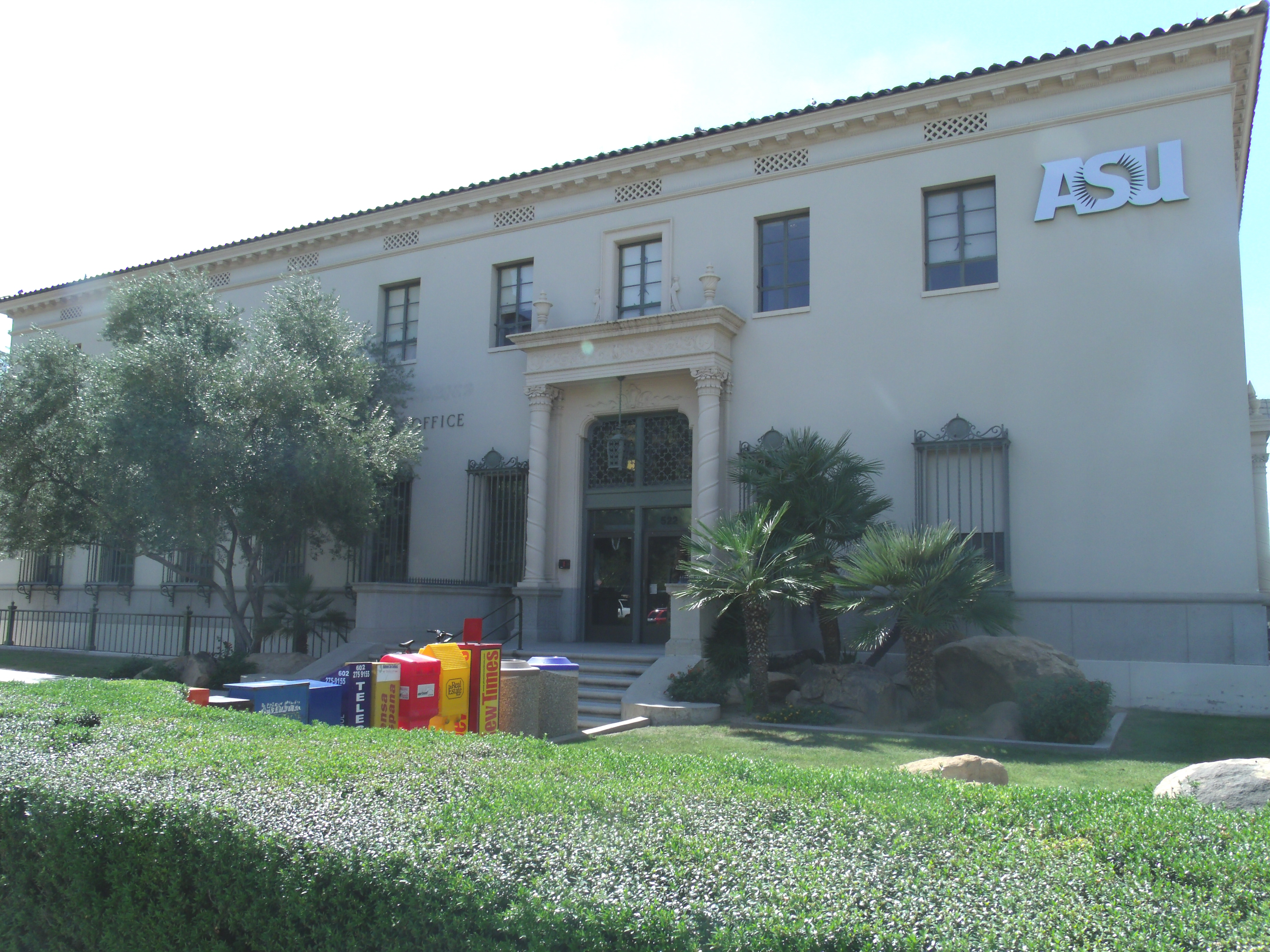
The U.S. Post Office / Federal Building was built 1932–1936 and is located at 522 N. Central Avenue. The building was listed in the Historic Properties in Phoenix Register in October 1990. It was listed in the National Register of Historic Places on February 10, 1983, reference #83002993.

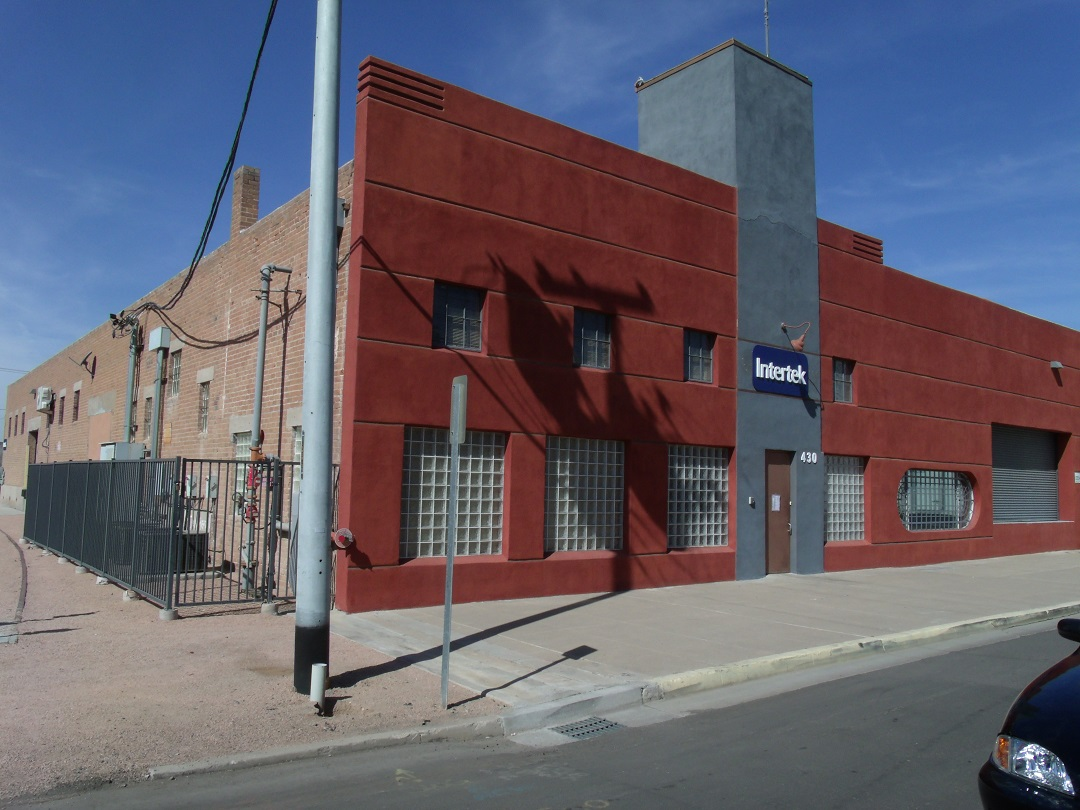
The Cobb Bros. Market Warehouse built in 1932 and located at 430 S. Second Avenue. Designated as a landmark with Historic Preservation-Landmark (HP-L) overlay zoning. Listed in the Phoenix Historic Property Register.

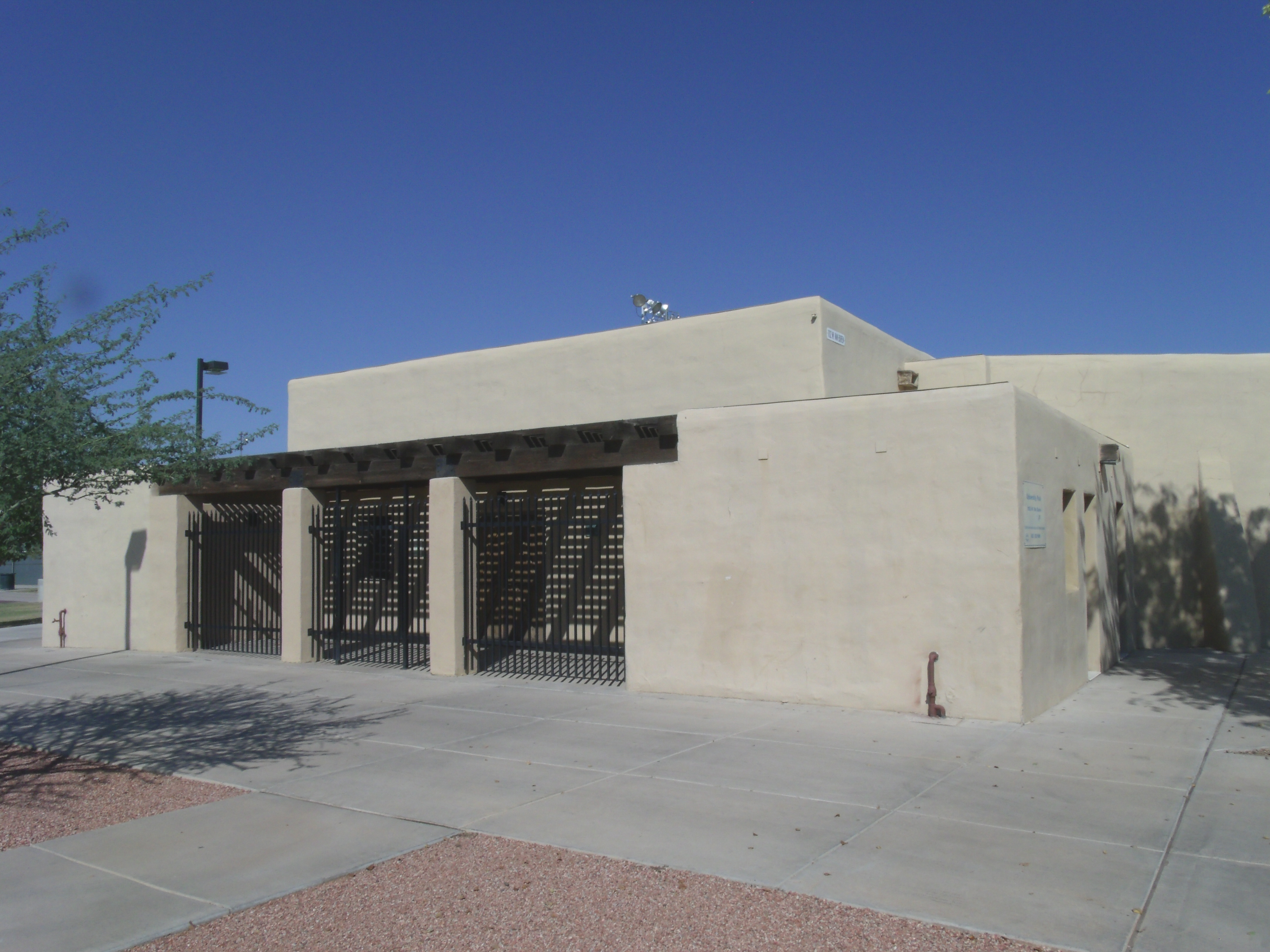
The University Park Bath (Pool) House was built in 1934 and is located on the grounds of University Park at 1002 W. Van Buren St. The building was listed in the Phoenix Historic Property Register in April 1989.

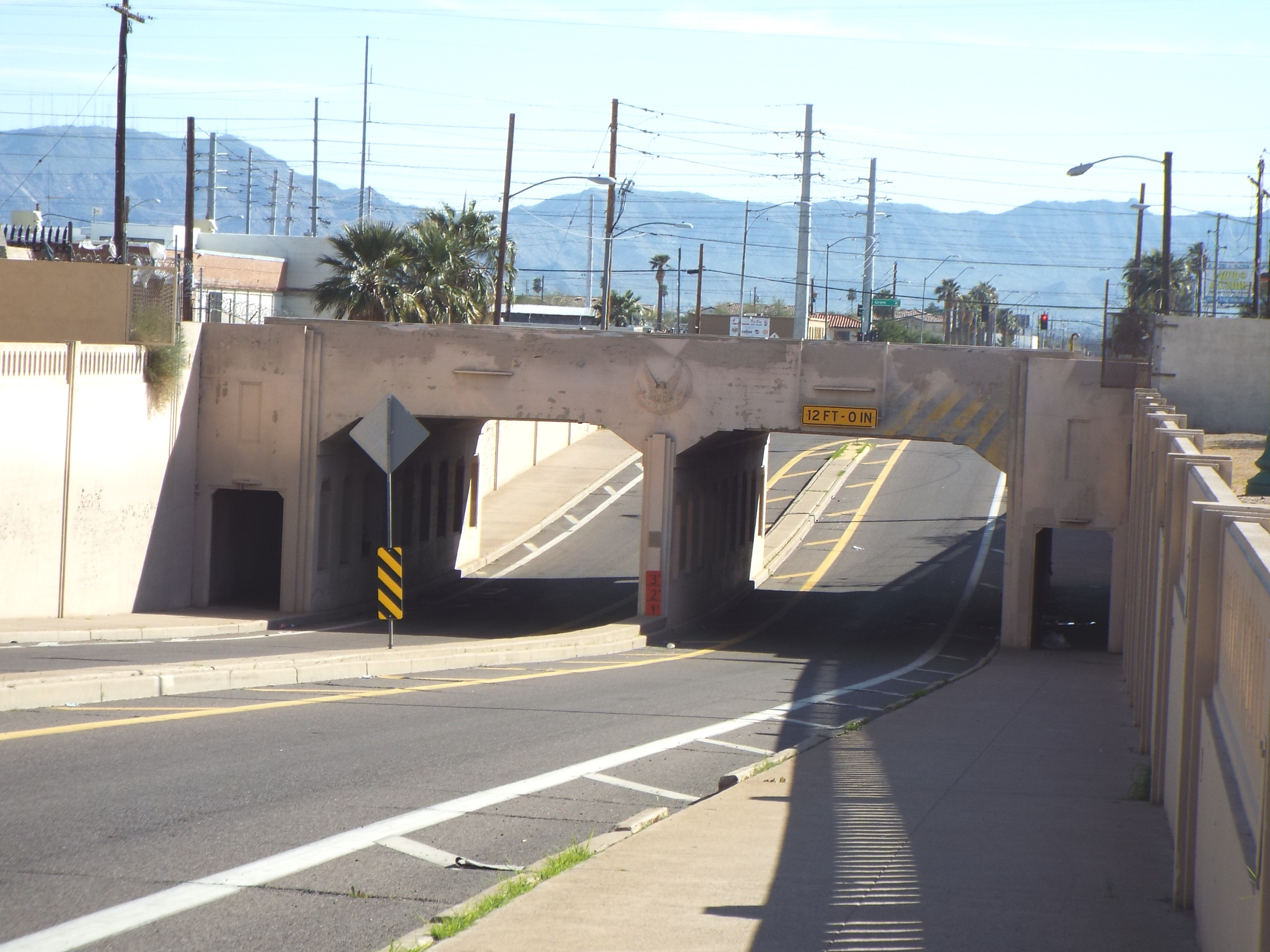
The 17th Avenue Underpass built in 1935 is a well-preserved example of Depression-era bridge construction. It is eligible for inclusion in the National Register of Historic Places.

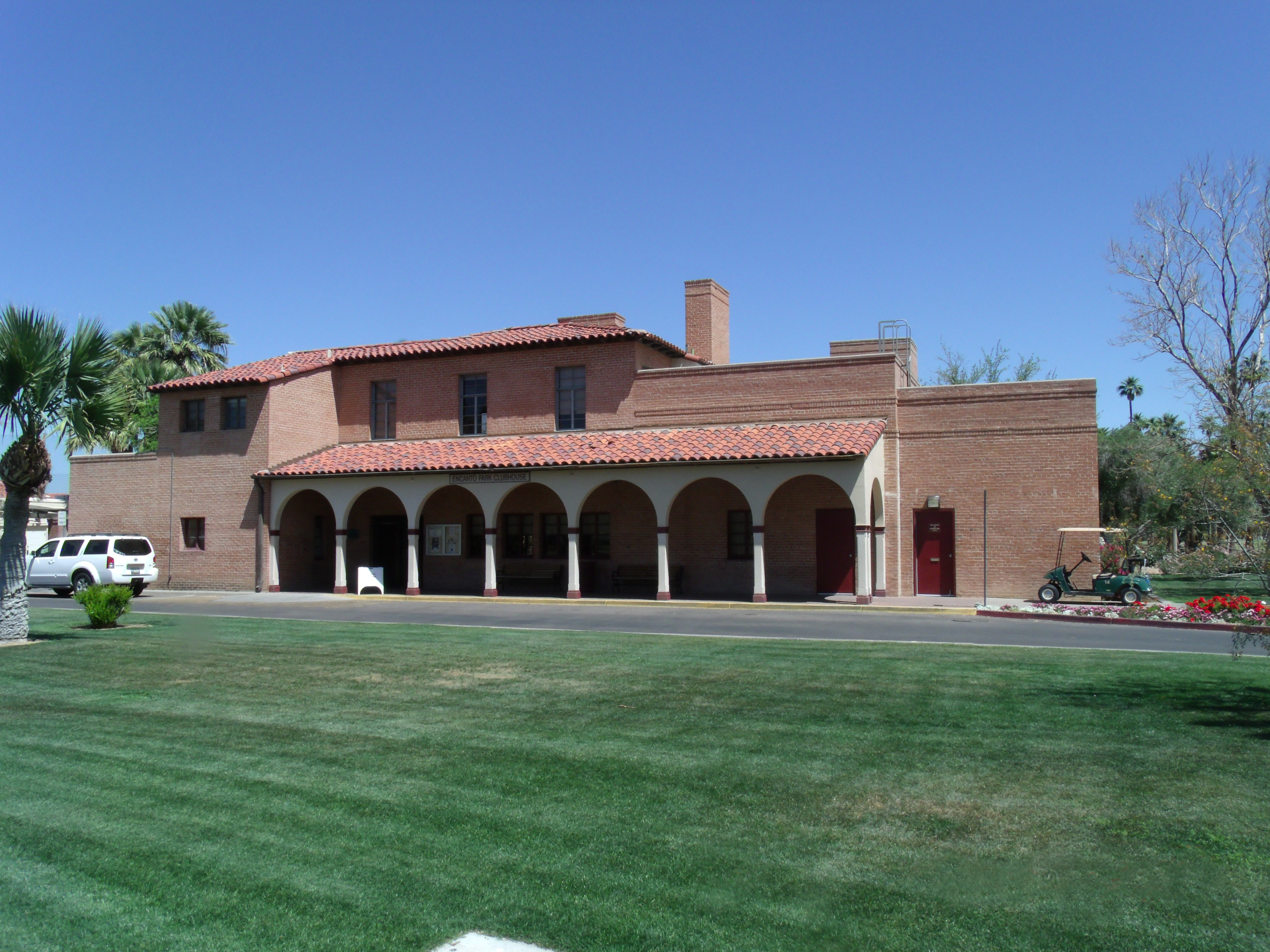
The Encanto Park Clubhouse was built in 1936 and is located at 1202 W Encanto Blvd. Listed in the Phoenix Historic Property Register.

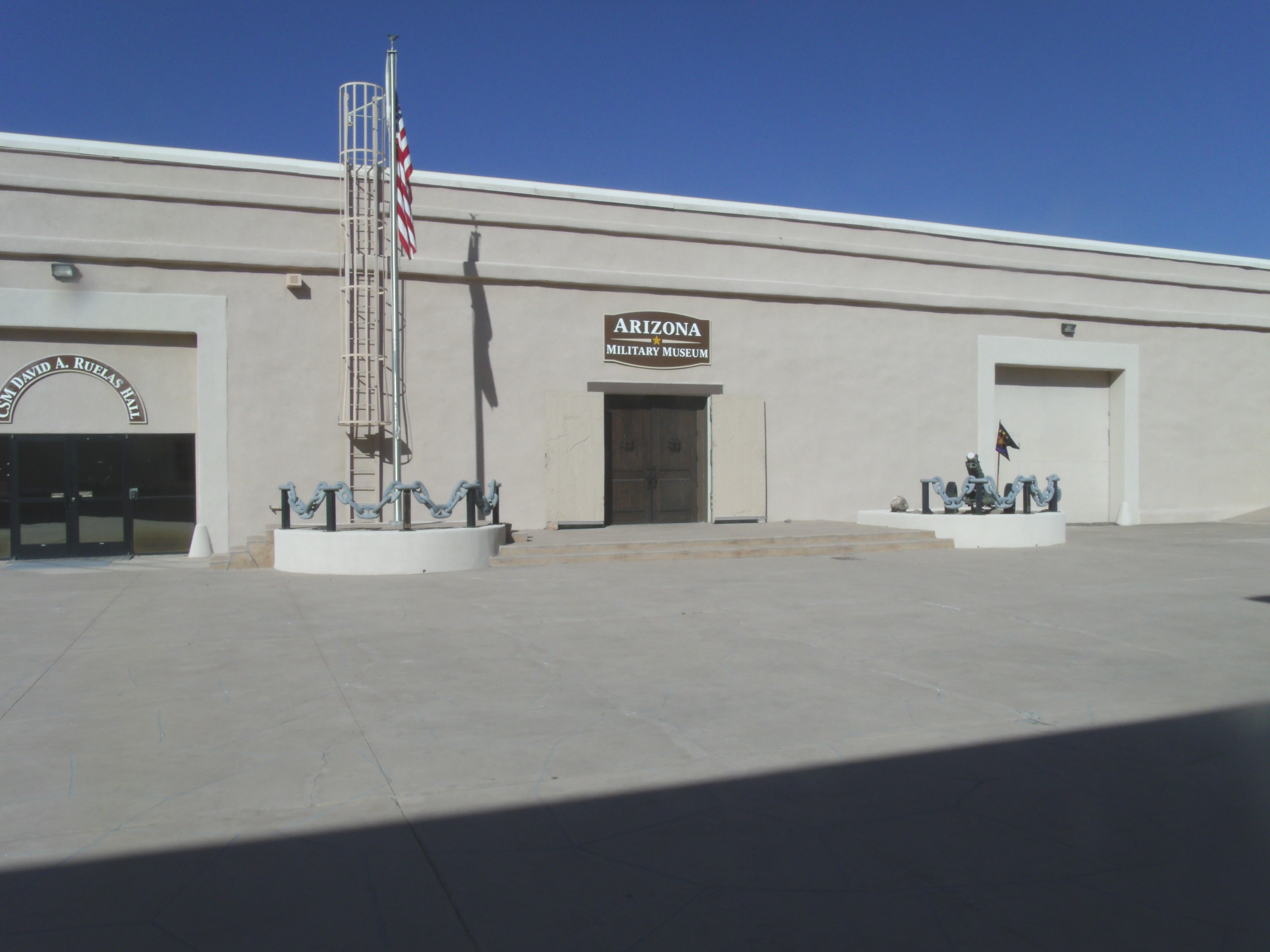
The Arizona Army National Guard Arsenal raw adobe building was constructed in 1936 and is located at 5636 E. McDowell Rd. It served as the National Guard arsenal building until WW II when it was converted into a maintenance shop for the German prisoners of war who were held in a camp located in what is now the Papago Park Military Reservation. The building now houses the Arizona Military Museum. The building was listed in the National Register of Historic Places March 31, 2010, reference: #10000108.

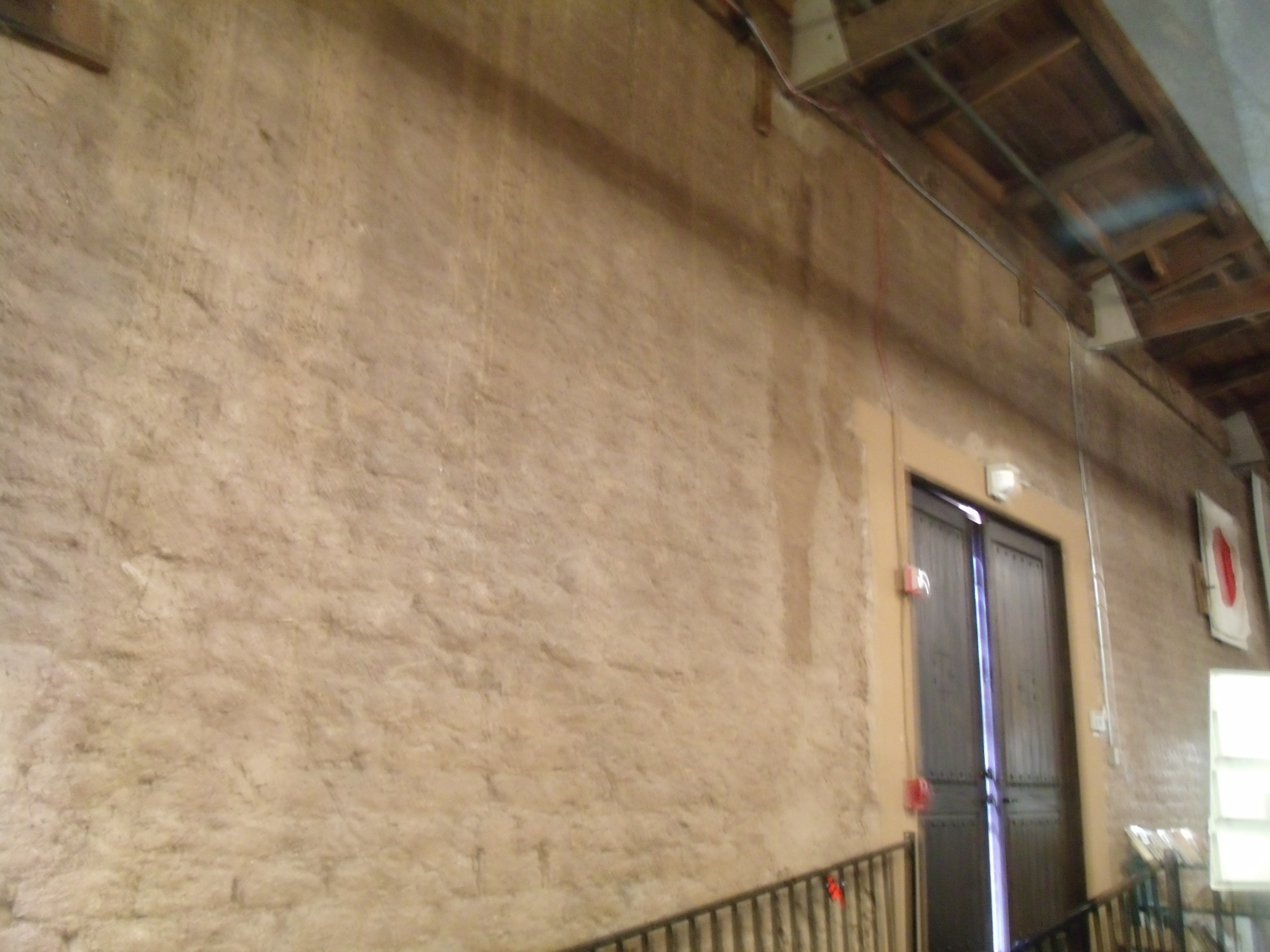
The original adobe walls inside the Arizona Army National Guard Arsenal building.

The Hunt Bass Hatchery Caretaker's House was built in 1936 and is located in the Phoenix Zoo grounds at 455 N. Galvin Parkway. Following the Great Depression, Governor Hunt (Arizona's first elected governor) commissioned a bass fish hatchery to be established in the Papago Park of Arizona during 1932. The property was listed in the National Register of Historic Places on January 23, 2003, reference: #02001723.

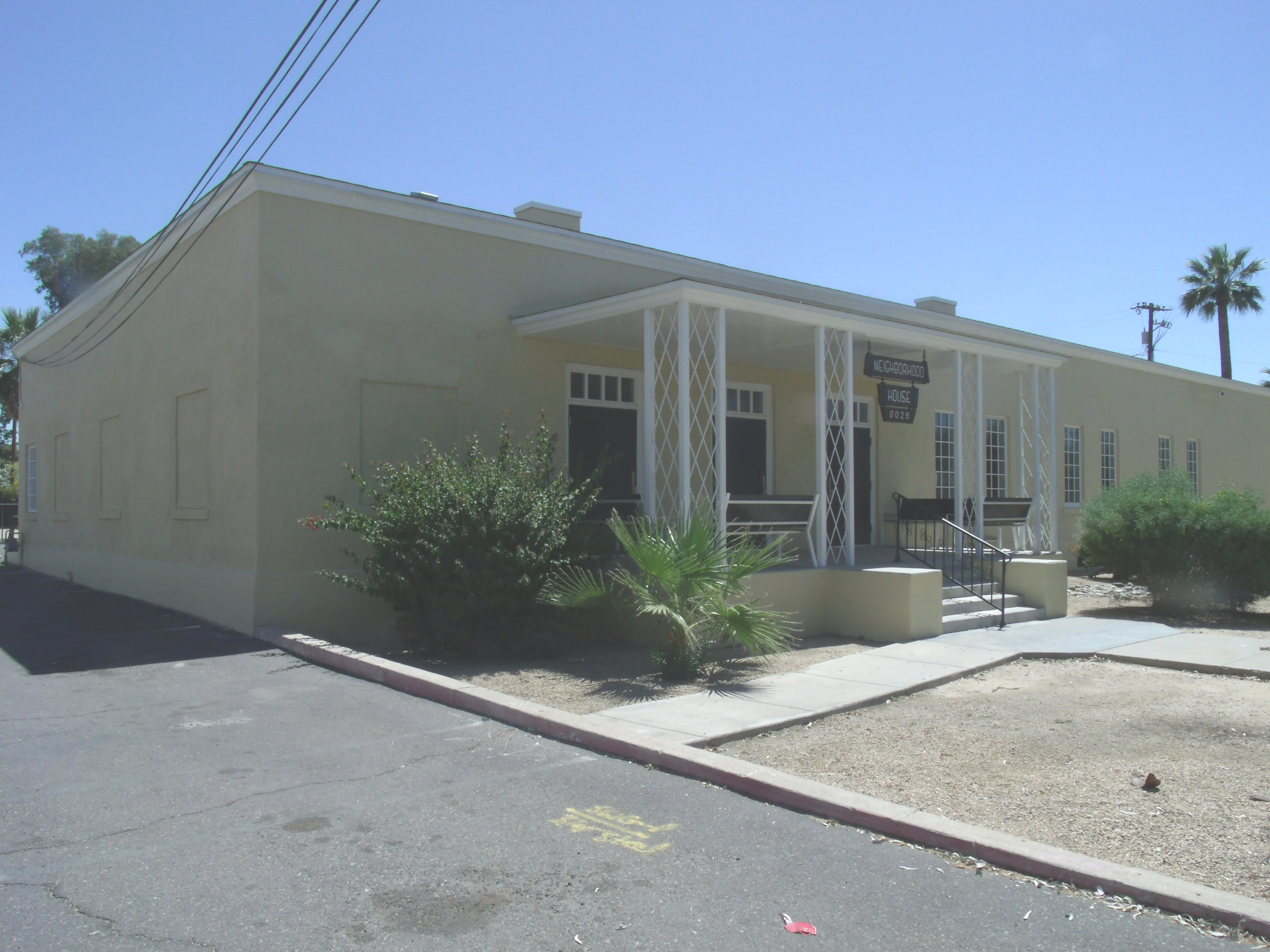
The Neighborhood House was built in 1937 and is located at 6029 S. Seventh St. It was listed in the Phoenix Historic Property Register in May 1990.

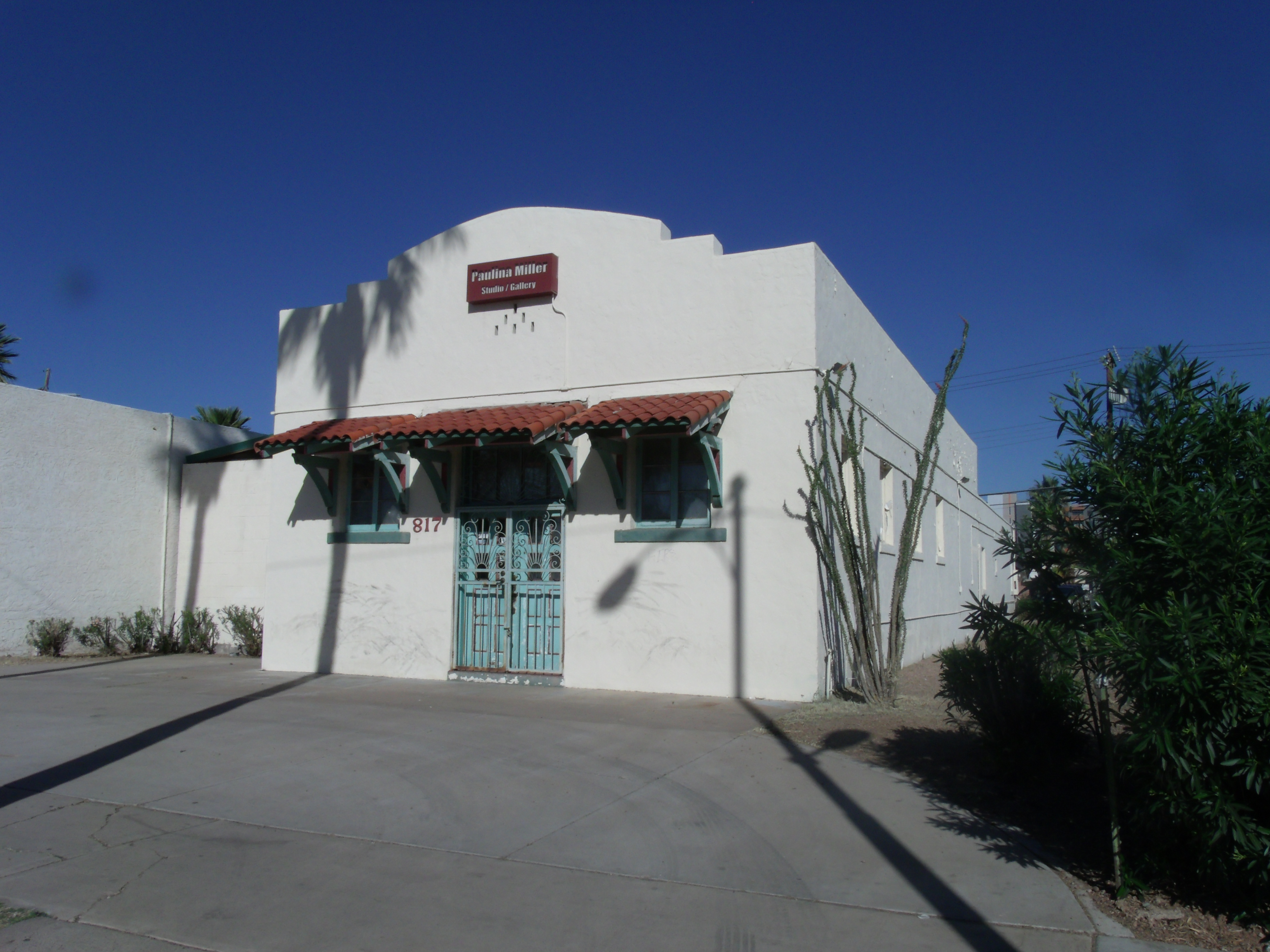
The Merryman Funeral Home was built in 1937 and is located at 817 N. First St. The property was listed in the Phoenix Historic Property Register in November 2005.

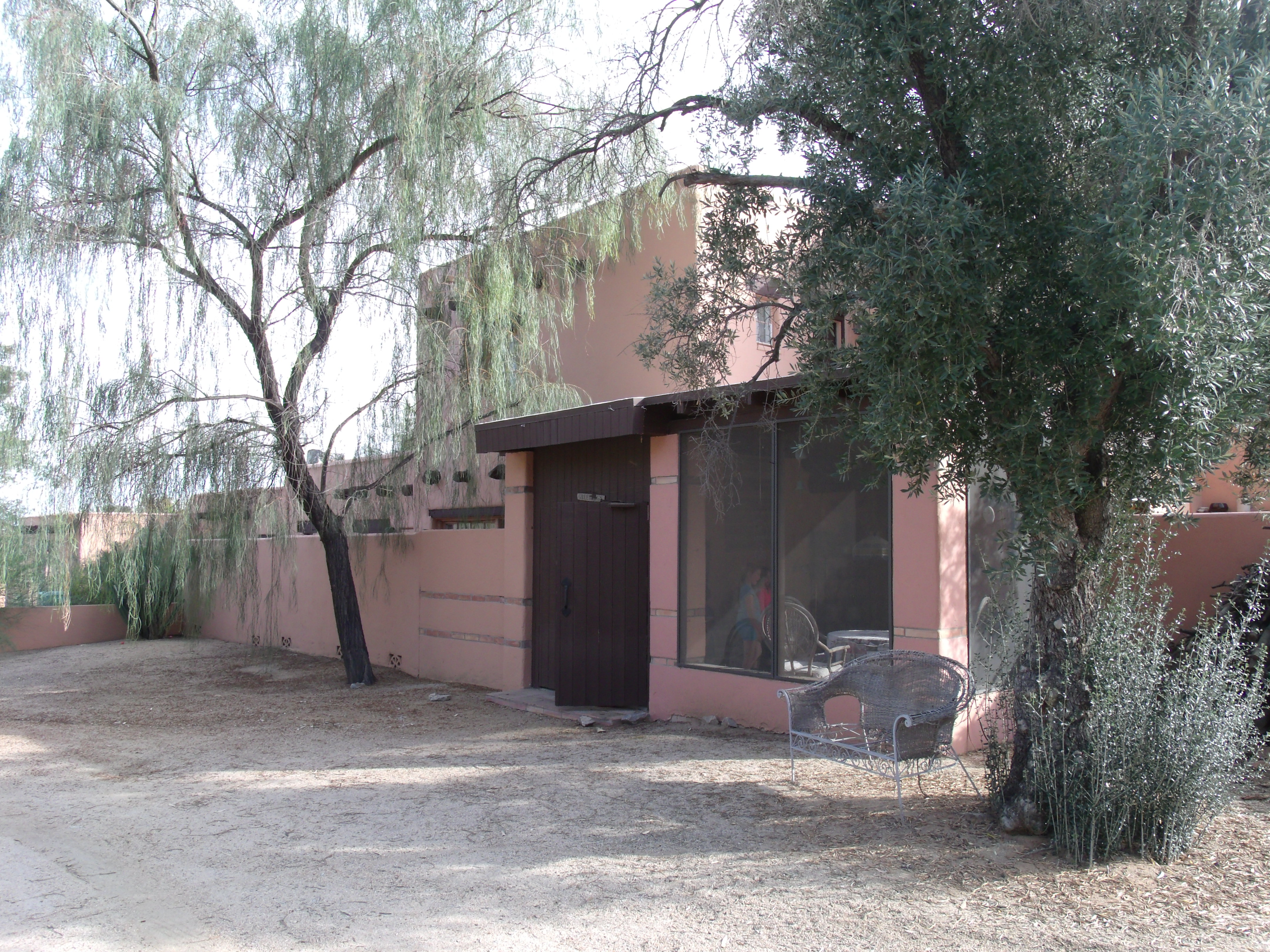
The Squaw Peak Inn was built in 1937 and is located at 4425 Horseshoe Road close to the east end of Squaw Peak Mountain in Phoenix. Among celebrities who have stayed in or visited the Inn, which was originally named Squaw Peak Ranch, are Dick Powell, June Allyson and Mamie Eisenhower. It served as the vocal point for the 1987 made-for-TV movie Probe: Plan Nine from Outer Space. The Inn was used as a backdrop during the interview made to Phoenix Suns Charles Barkley by ABC's prime Time Live on May 27, 1993. On January 12, 1995, the property was listed in the National Register of Historic Places, reference: #94001537.

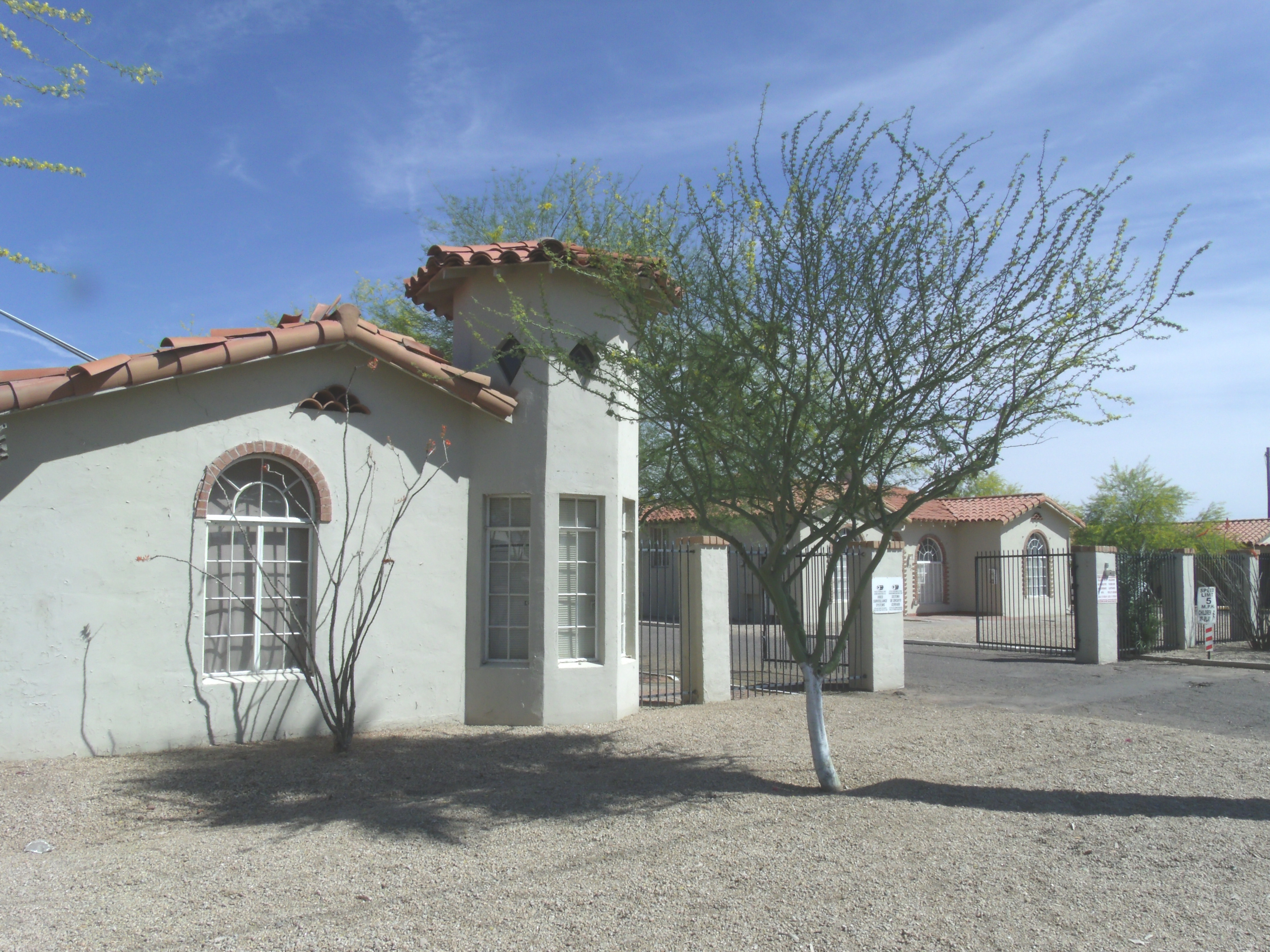
King's Rest Hotel Motor Court was built in 1937 and is located at 801 S. 17th Avenue. Listed in the National Register of Historic Places, reference: #87001882.

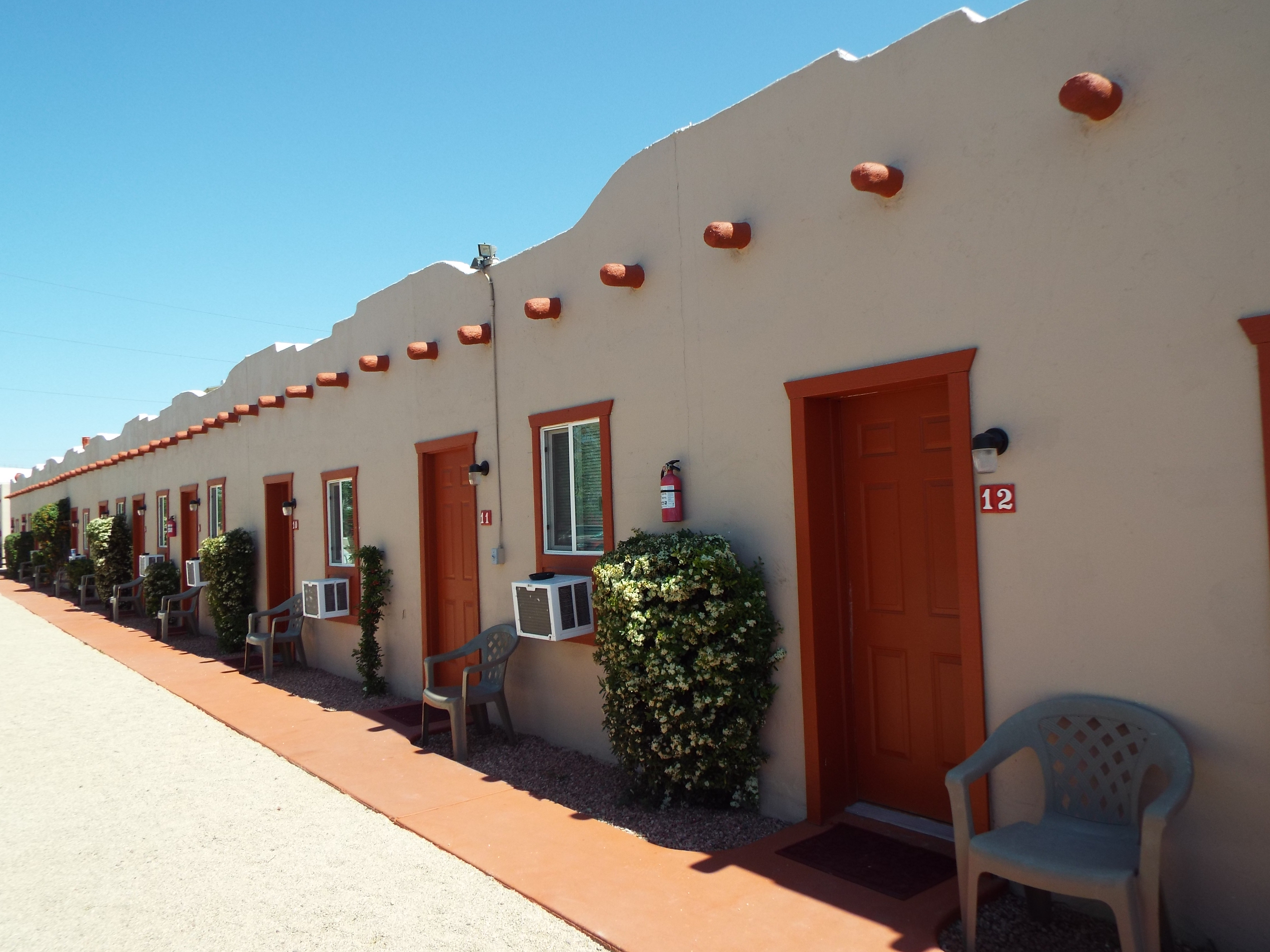
This motel started as the Arrow Motel and later became the Rainbow Motel. It was built in 1937 and is located on 2262 Grand Avenue. The property was listed in the Phoenix Historic Property in October 2020.

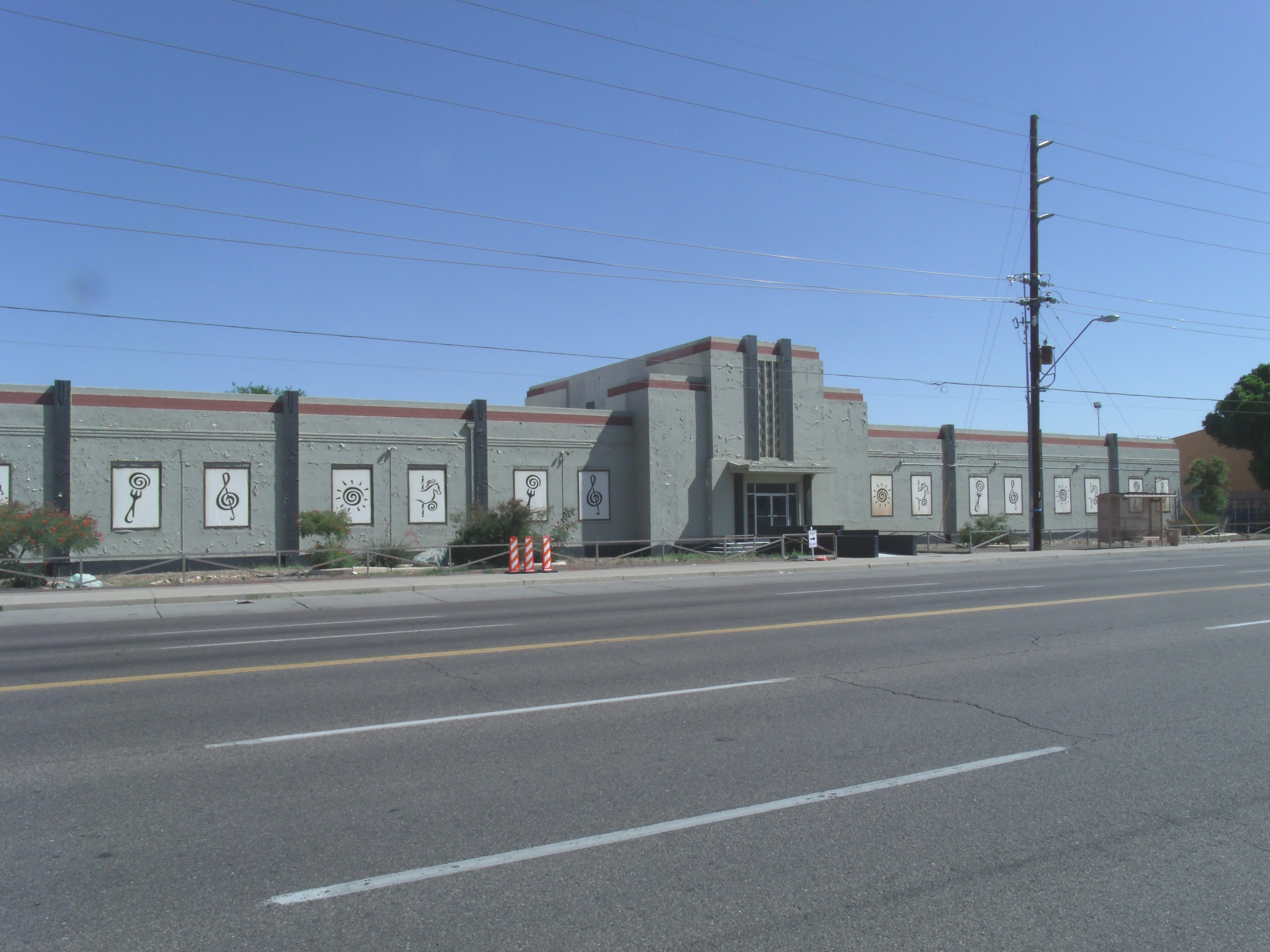
The Arizona State Fair WPA Civic Building was built during the Great Depression Era in 1938 and is located at 1826 West McDowell Road.

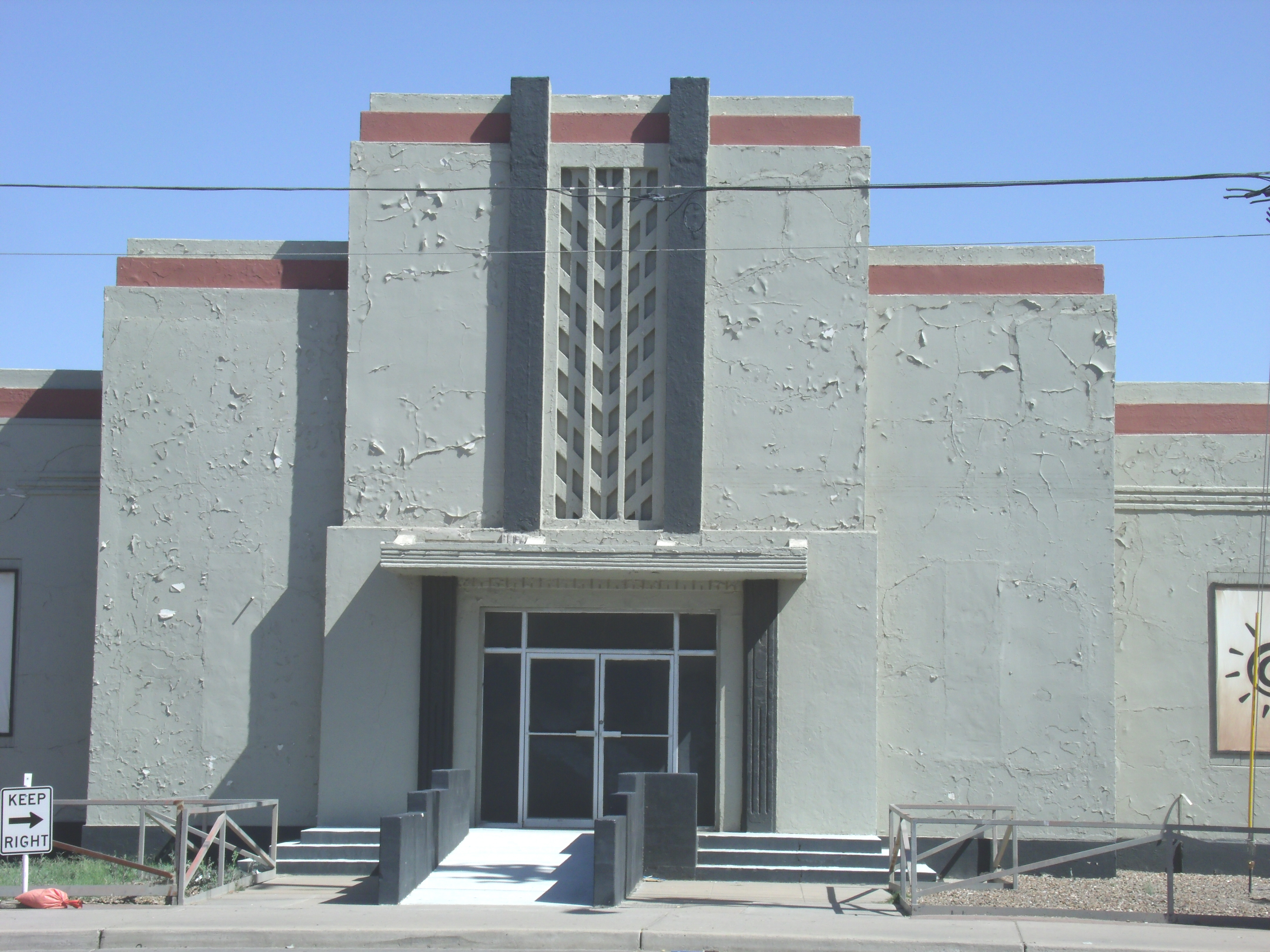
The front entrance of the Arizona State Fair WPA Civic Building, which was built during the Great Depression Era in 1938. It is located at 1826 West McDowell Road.

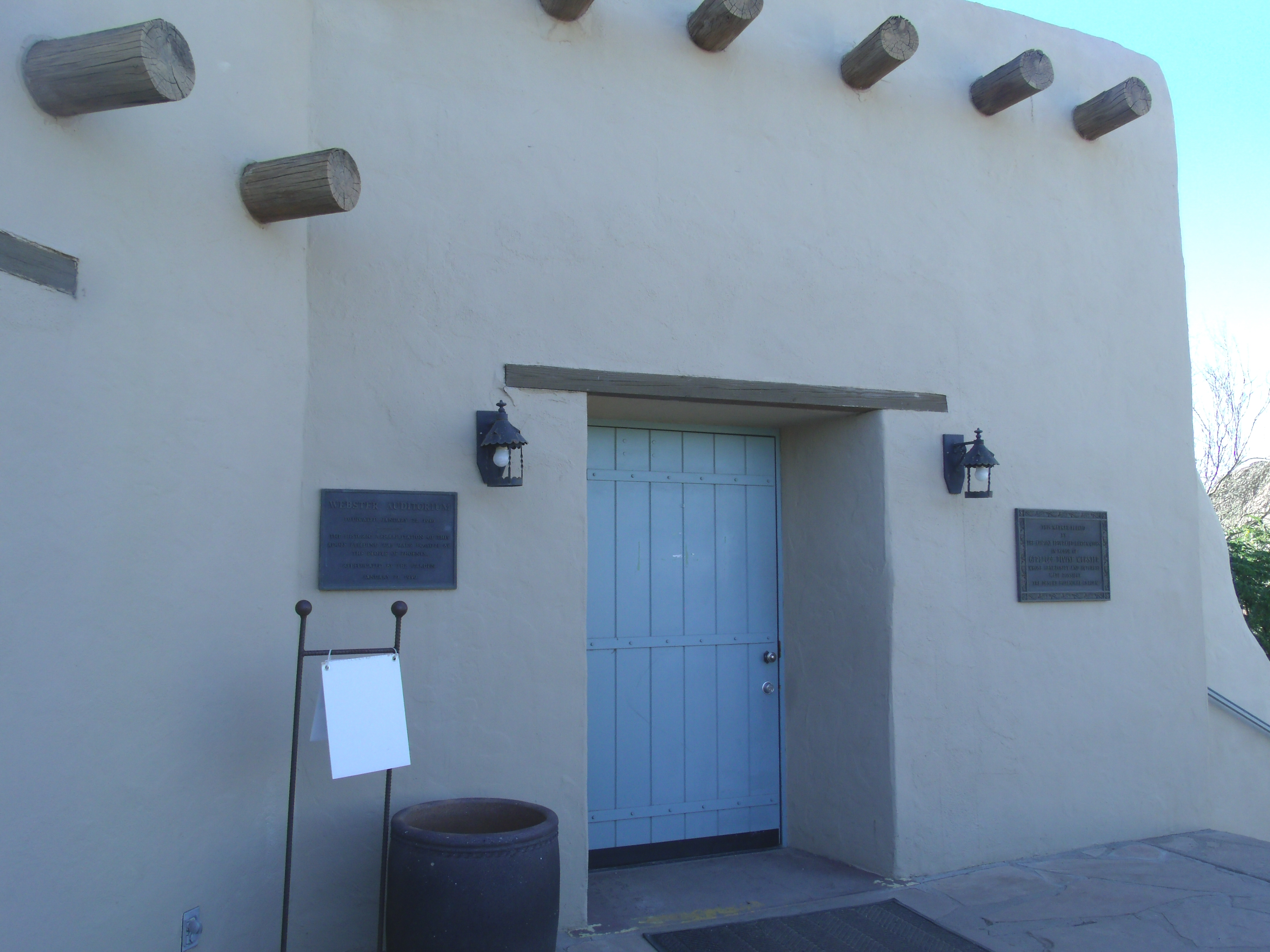
The Webster Auditorium building was constructed in 1939 and is located inside the compounds of the Desert Botanical Garden at 1201 N. Galvin Parkway. The auditorium is named after Gertrude Webster. On June 13, 1990, the National Park Service certified Webster Auditorium as a national historic site. It was listed in the National Register of Historic Places on May 1, 1990, reference: #9000823.

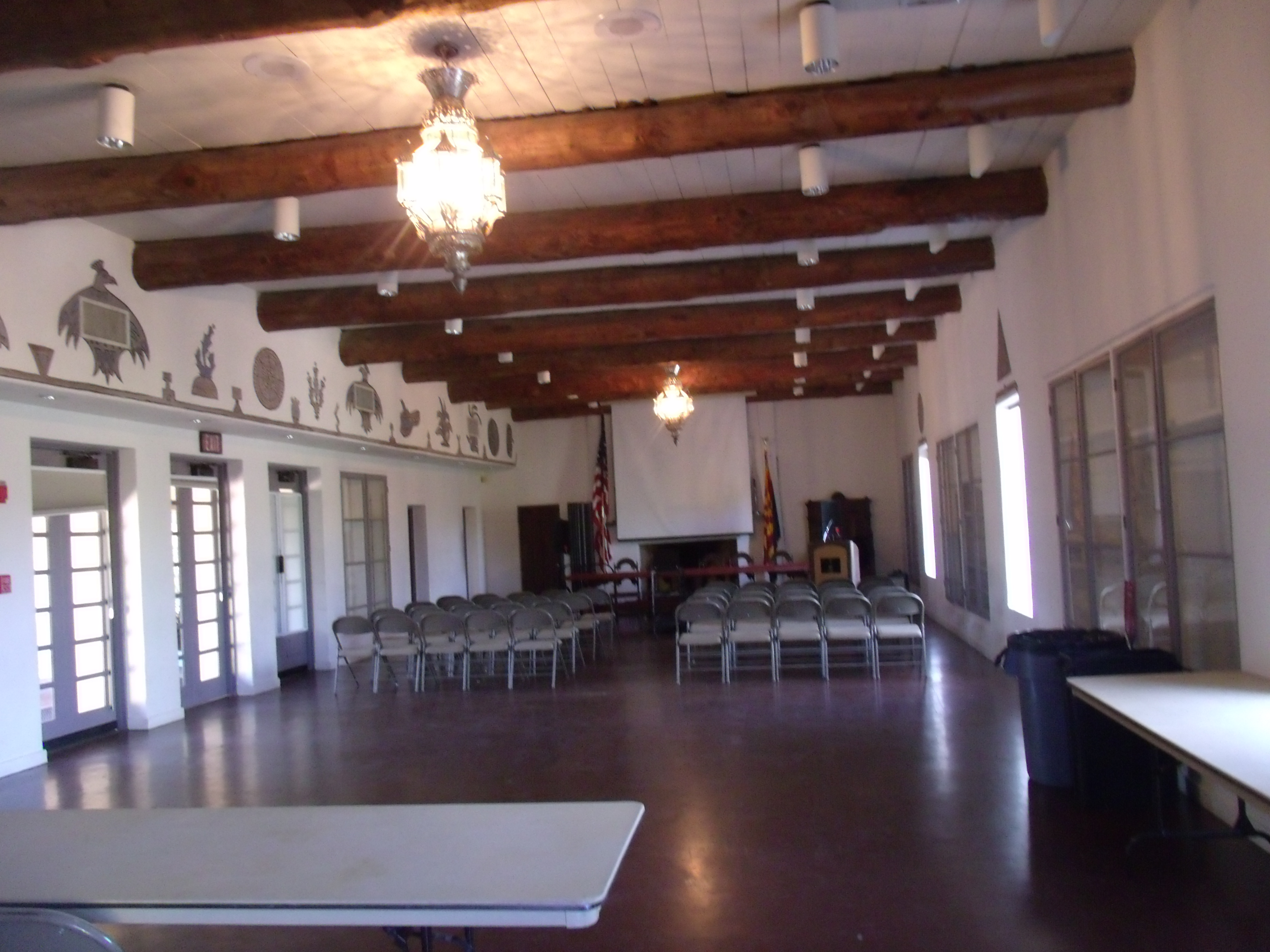
Inside the Webster Auditorium.

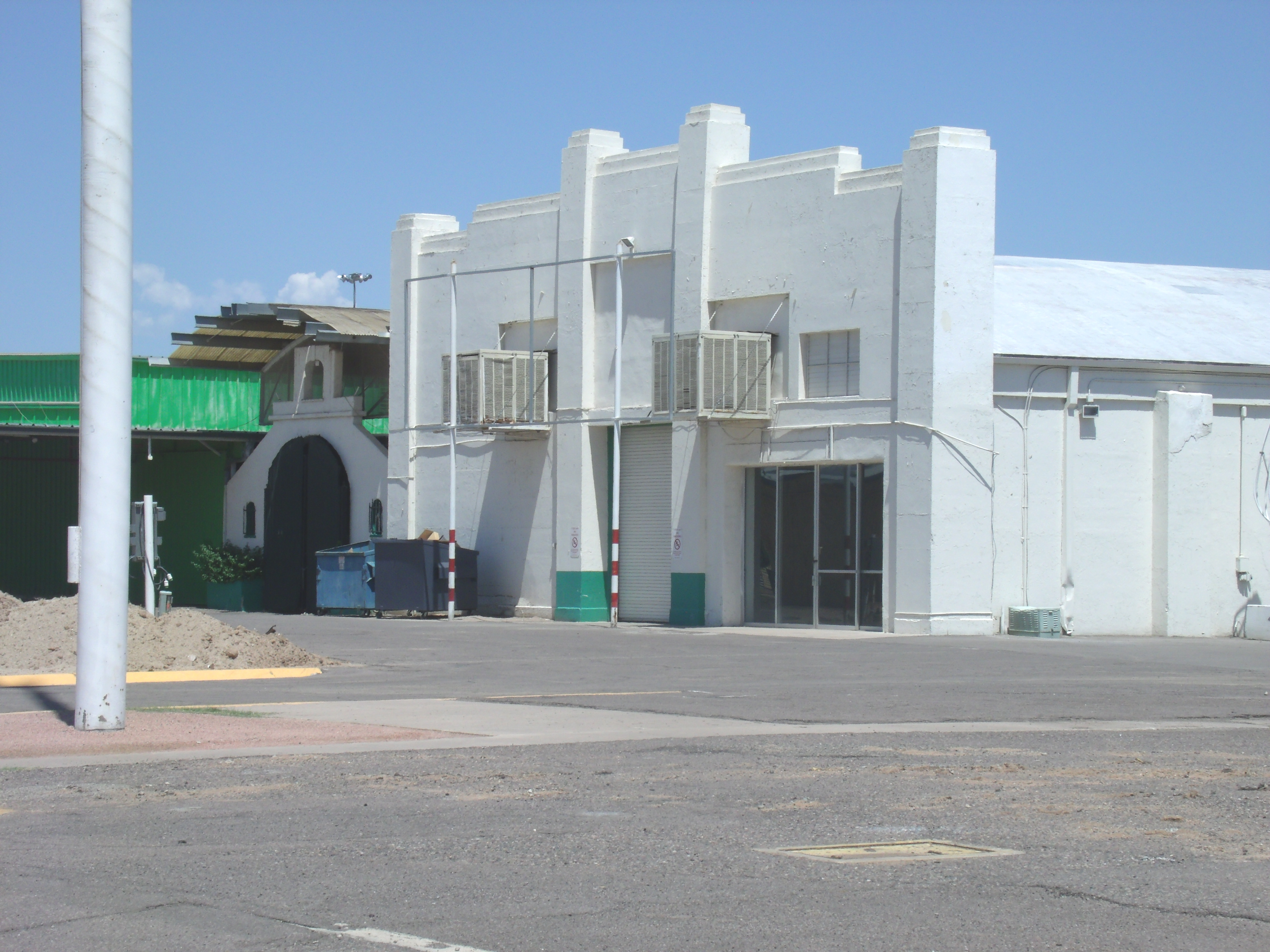
The Arizona State Fair Home Economics Building was built in 1940 on the Arizona State Fairgrounds and is in danger of being demolished.

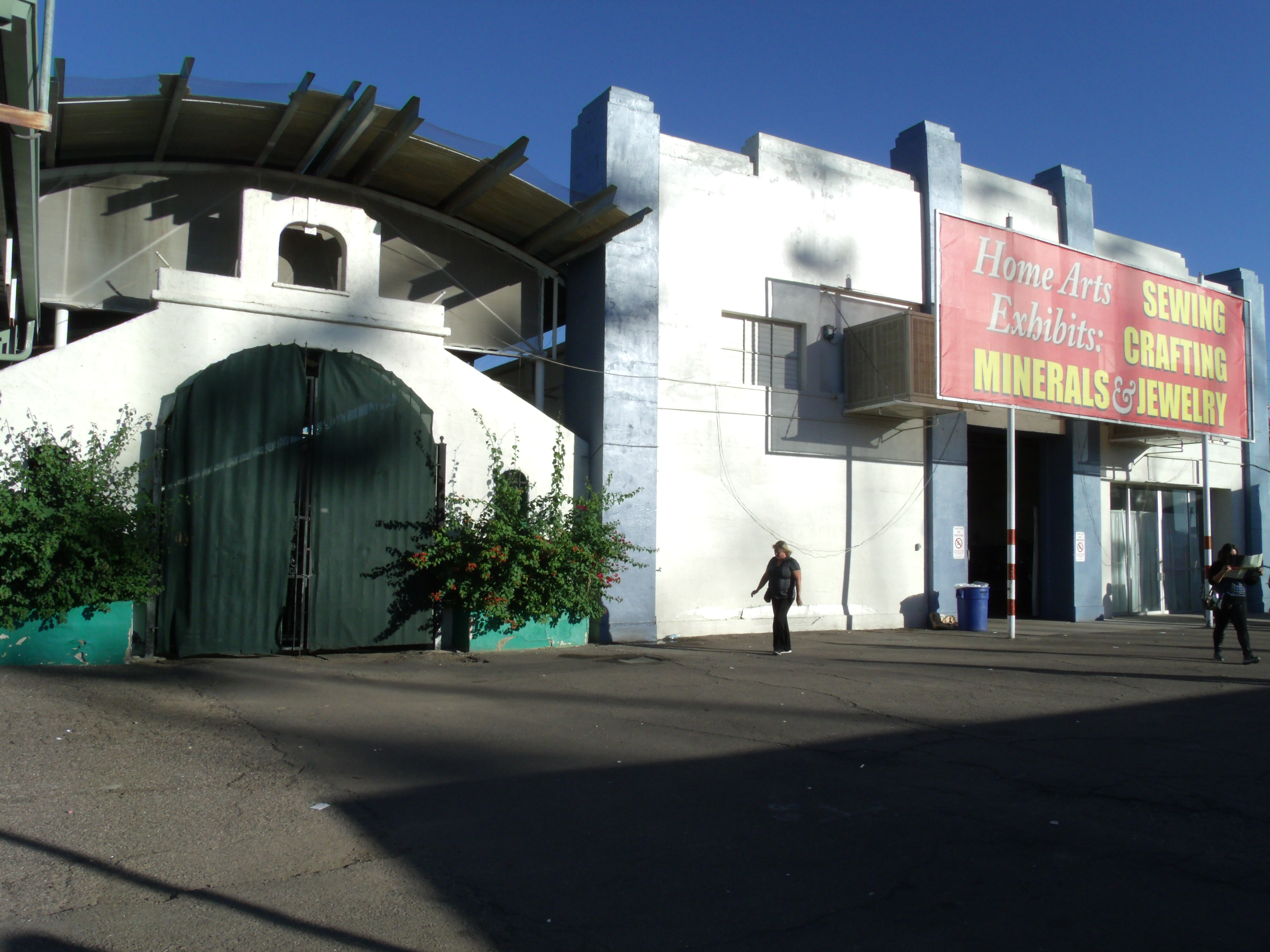
Close up view of the Arizona State Fair Home Economics Building.

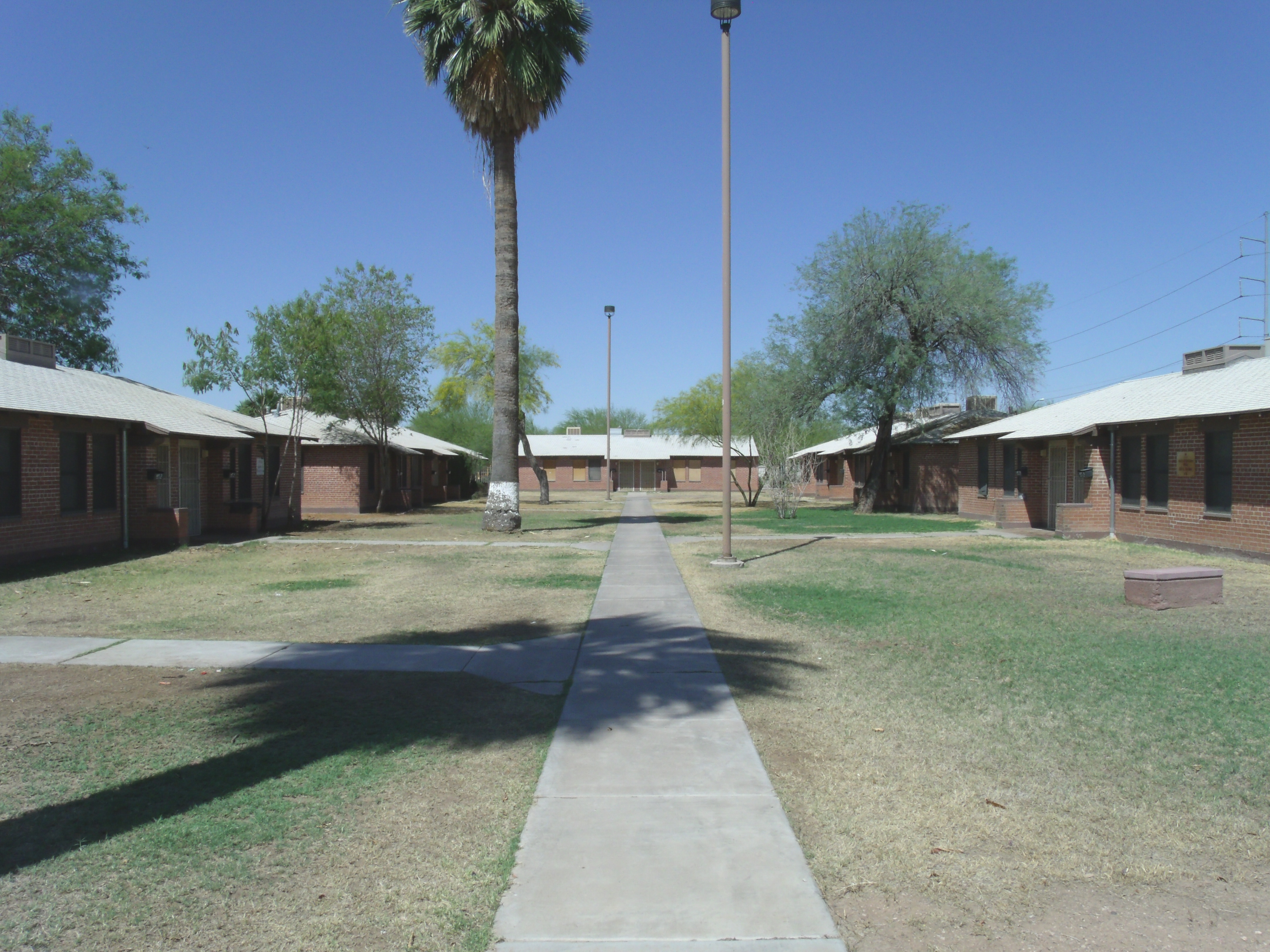
The only remaining courtyard of the Matthew Henson Public Housing Project with the original houses which have been preserved from demolition. The housing project was built in 1940 and provided affordable housing for the African-American community. The Matthew Henson Public Housing Project district is located on the west side of Seventh Avenue just south of the Sherman Street alignment. It was named as a historic district by the Phoenix Historic Property Register in June 2005.

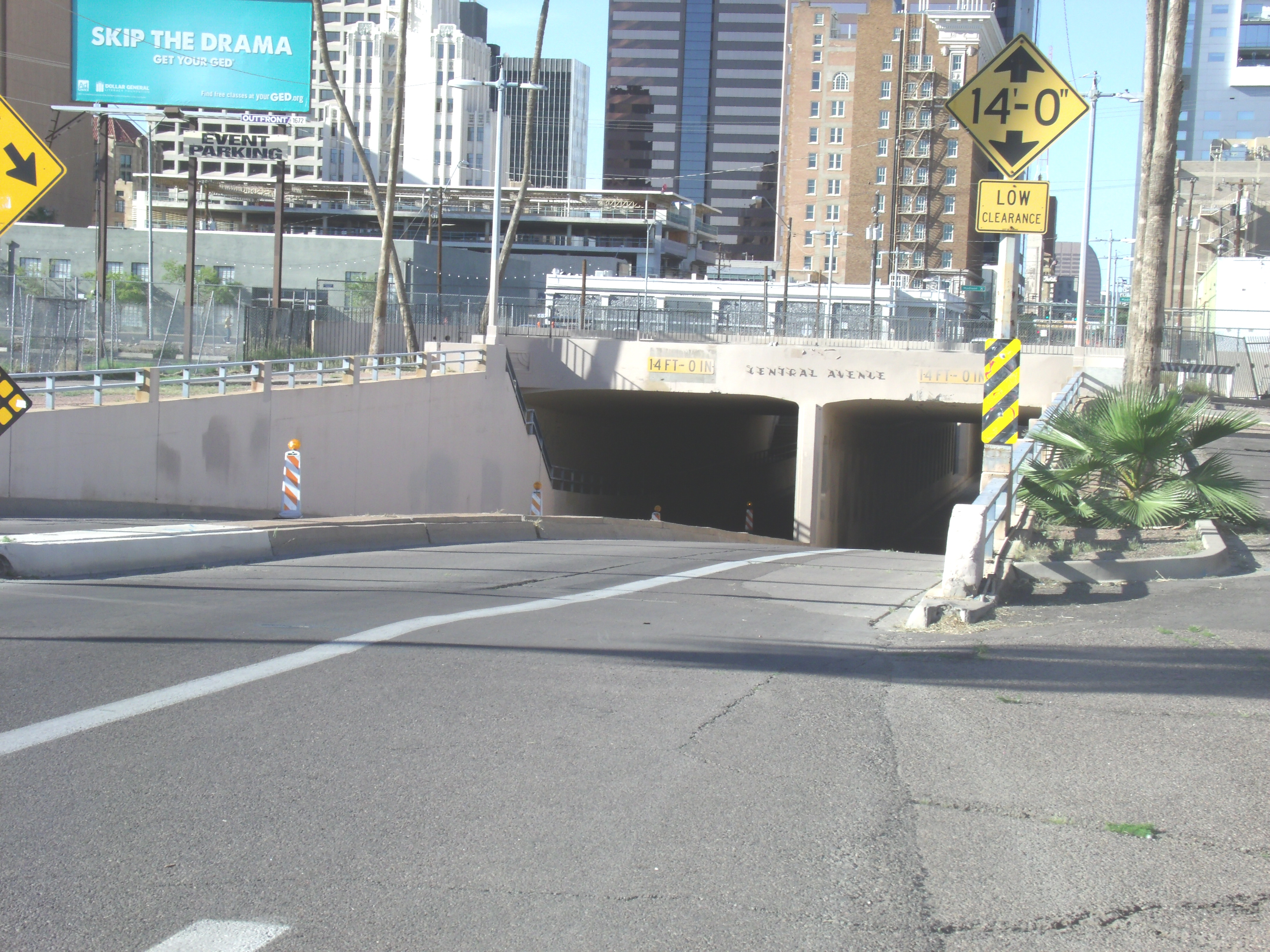
The Central Avenue Underpass was built in 1940 and is located on Central Avenue just south of Madison Street in downtown Phoenix. The above bridge was originally built for the ATSF railway. It was listed in the Phoenix Historic Property Register.

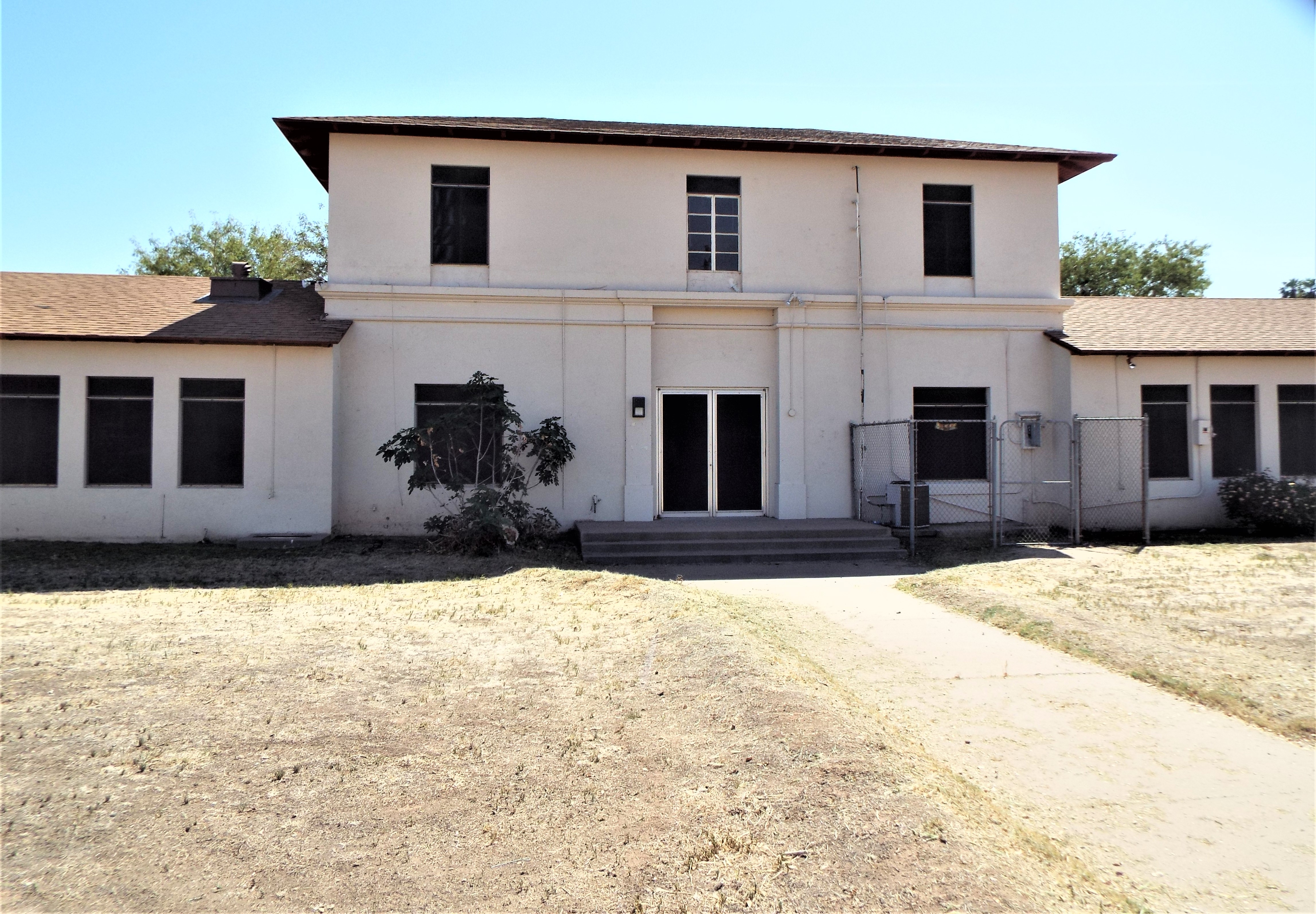
The Crippled Children's Hospital was built in 1941 and is located at 1825 E. Garfield St. It was listed in the Phoenix Historic Property Register in September 2020.

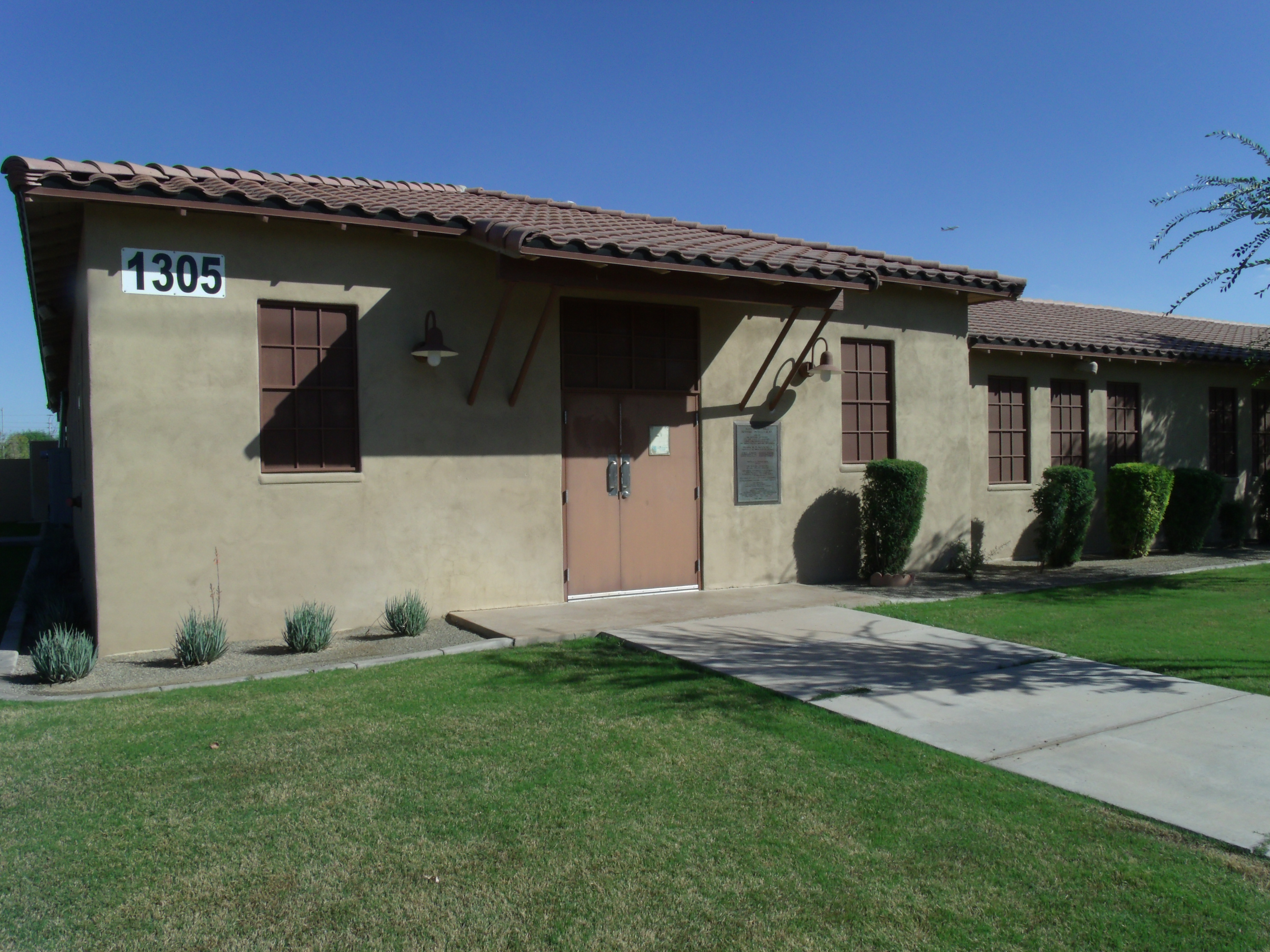
The Phoenix Housing Authority Building was built in 1941 and located at 1301 – 1305 1301 S. Third Avenue. It was listed in the Phoenix Historic Property Register in October 2007.

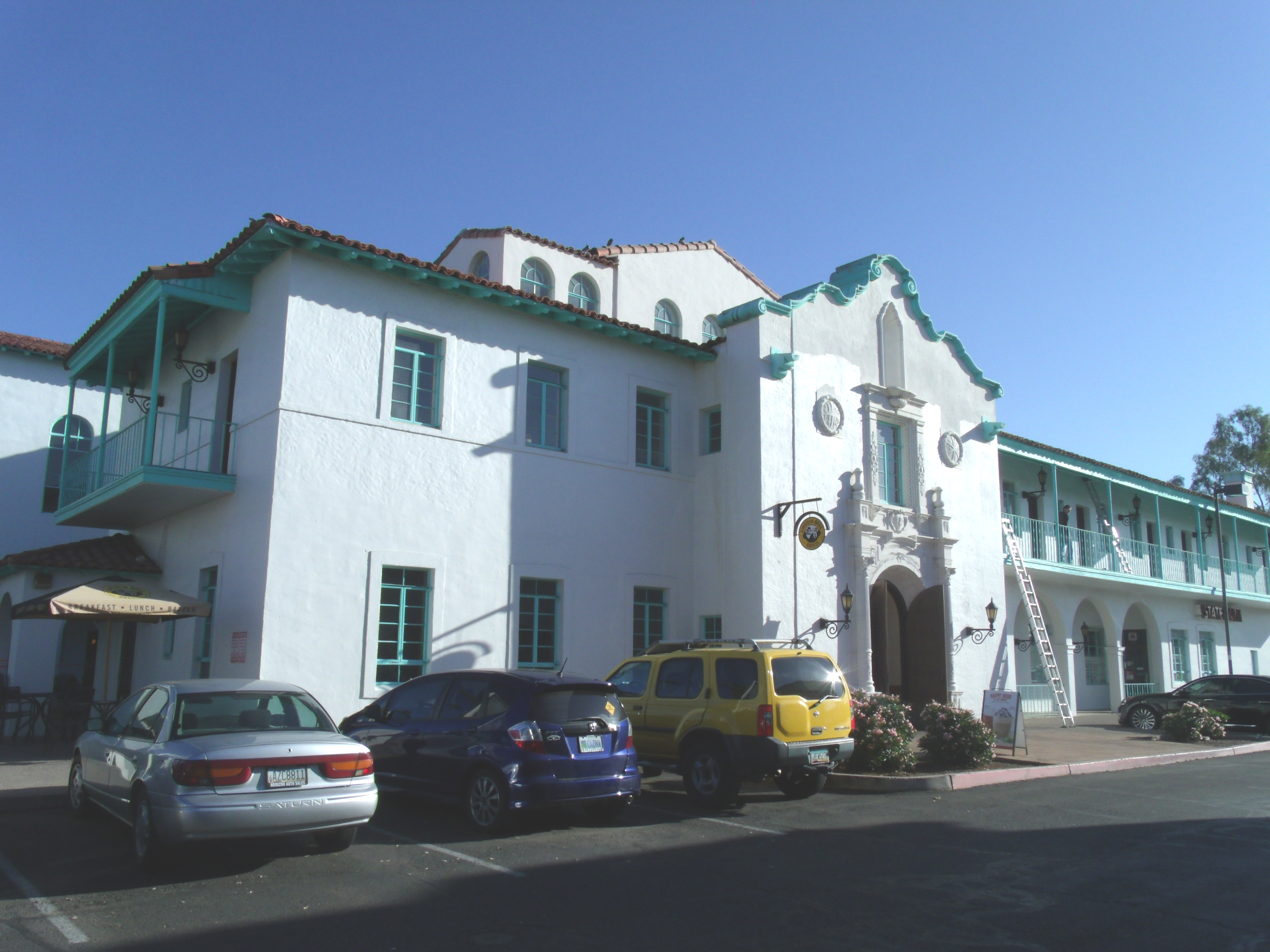
The Good Shepherd Home for Girls structure was built in 1942 and is located near the northeast corner of Northern and 19th Avenues. The home for girls closed in 1981 and is now a commercial property. The owners have kept the main architectural features intact. Designated as a landmark with Historic Preservation-Landmark (HP-L) overlay zoning. It was listed in the Phoenix Historic Property Register

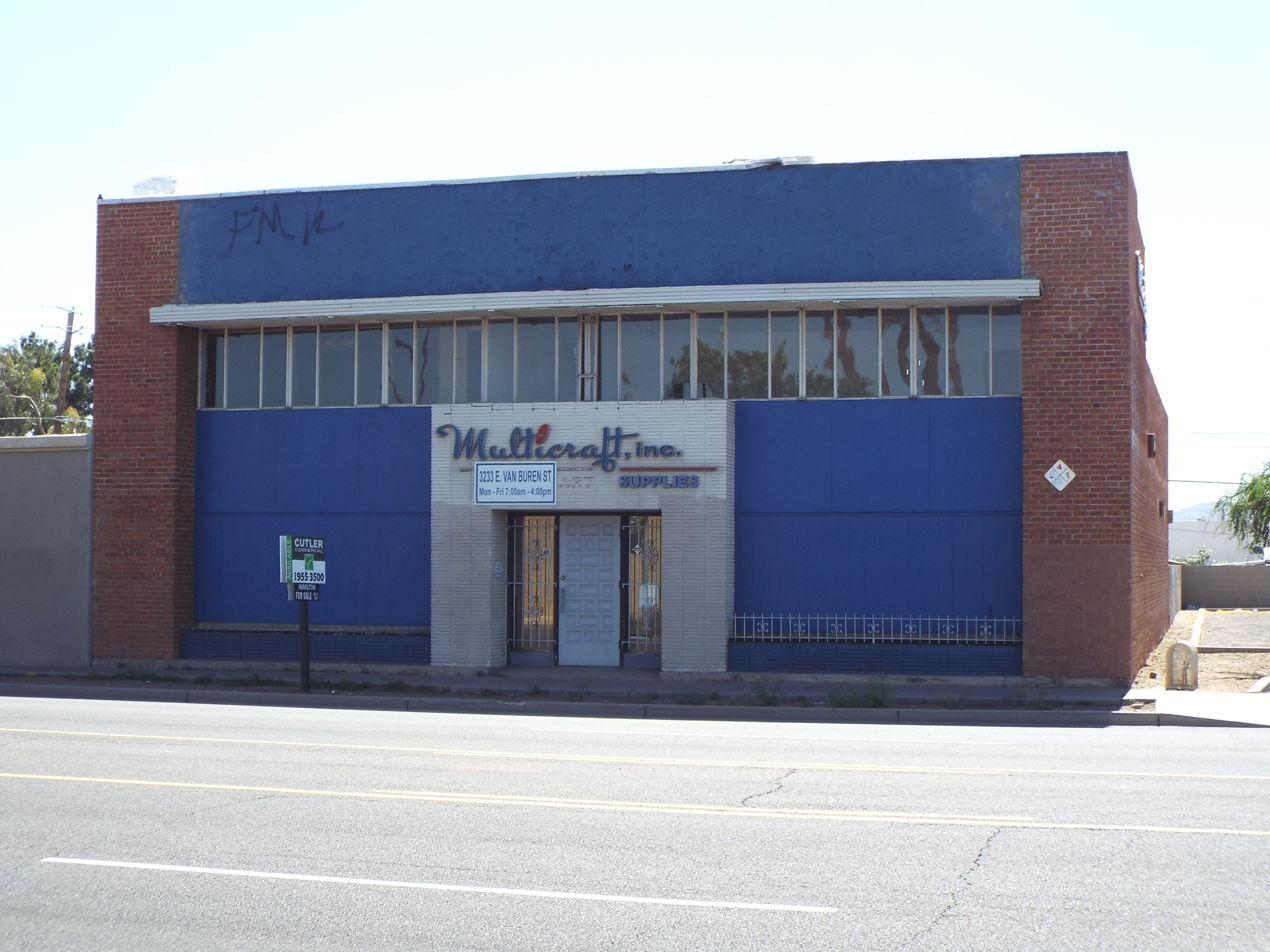
The Pohle Dry Cleaning Building was built in 1946. It is located at 3233 E. Van Buren Street. The style of the building at the time was a progressive international style. The building is considered historical by the Phoenix Historic Preservation Office.

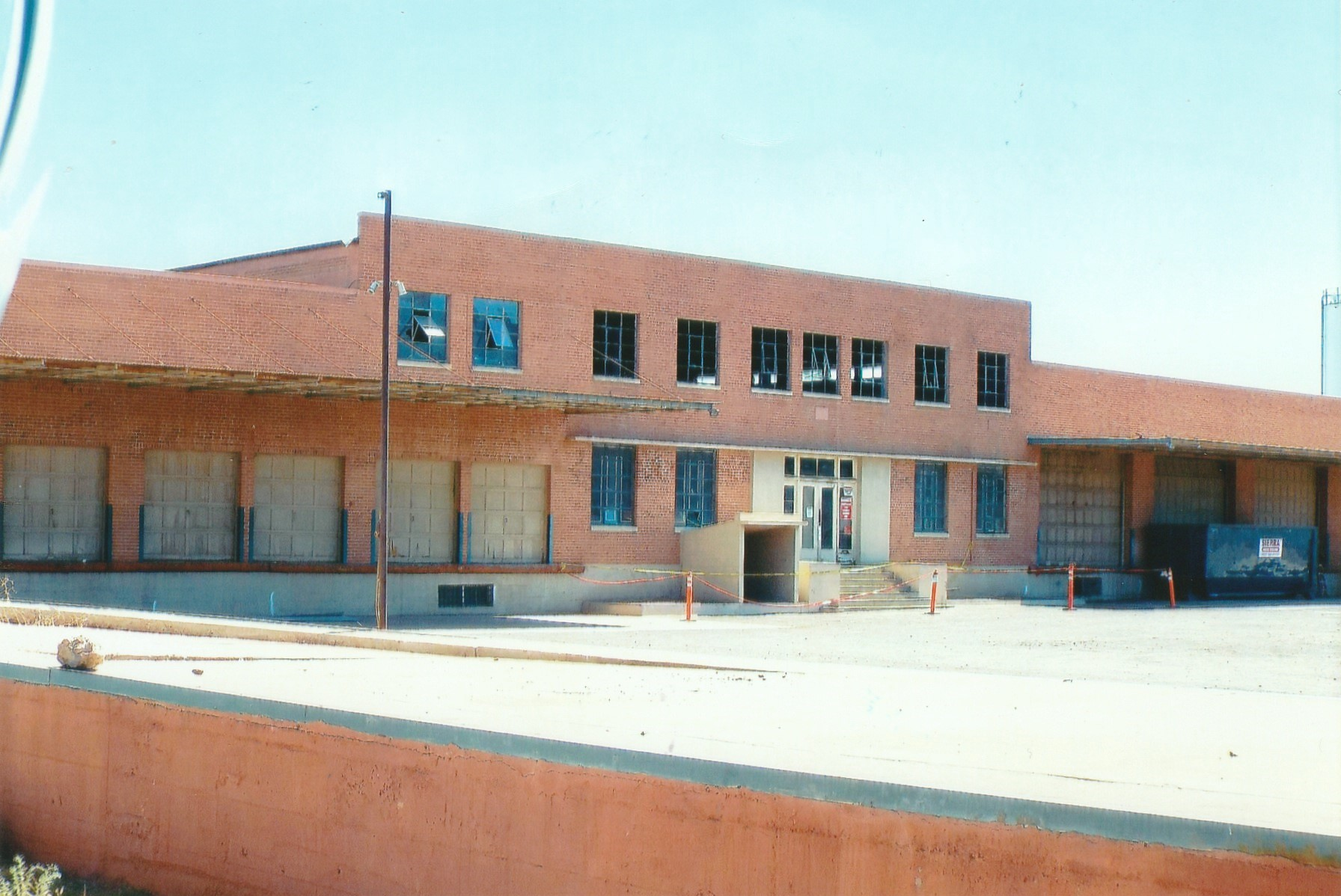
The General Sales Co. building was built in 1946. It is located at 515 E. Grant St. The builders combined the Classicism with the feeling of Organicism styles. The building was listed in the National Register of Historic Places on October 4, 2016, reference: #16000681.

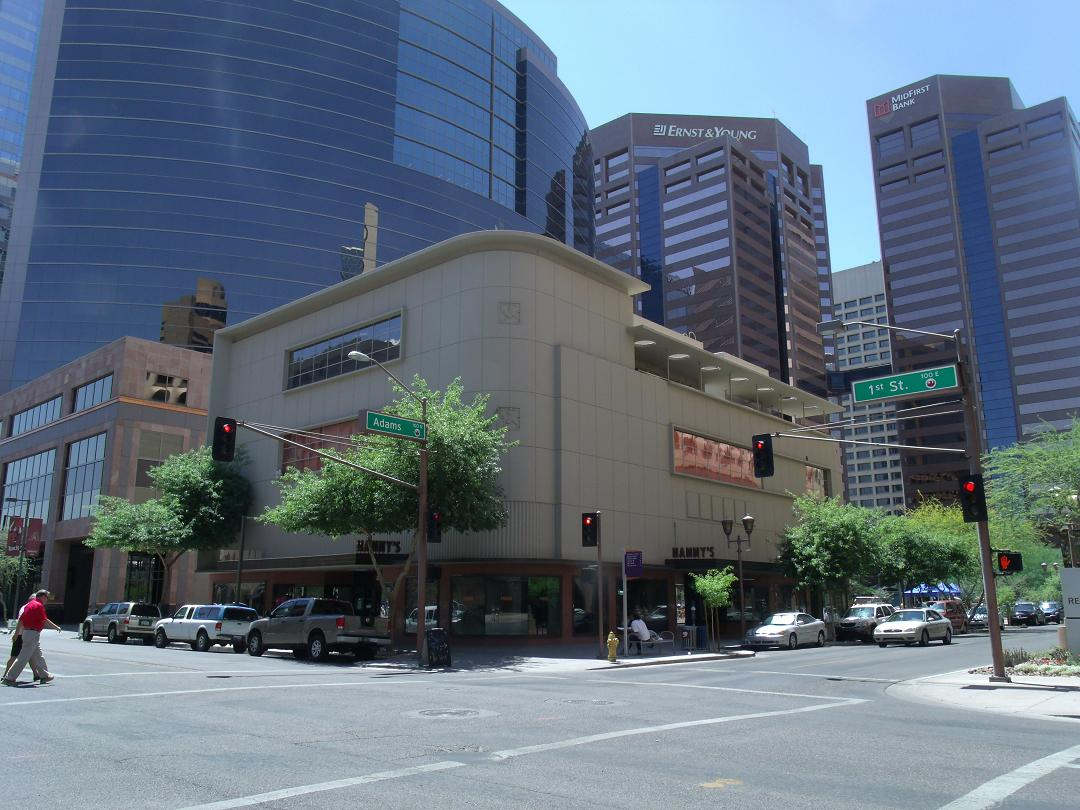
Hanny's, also known as 29-22, was built in 1947 and is located at 44 N. 1st. street. It was added to the National Register of Historic Places in 1985, reference: #85002058.

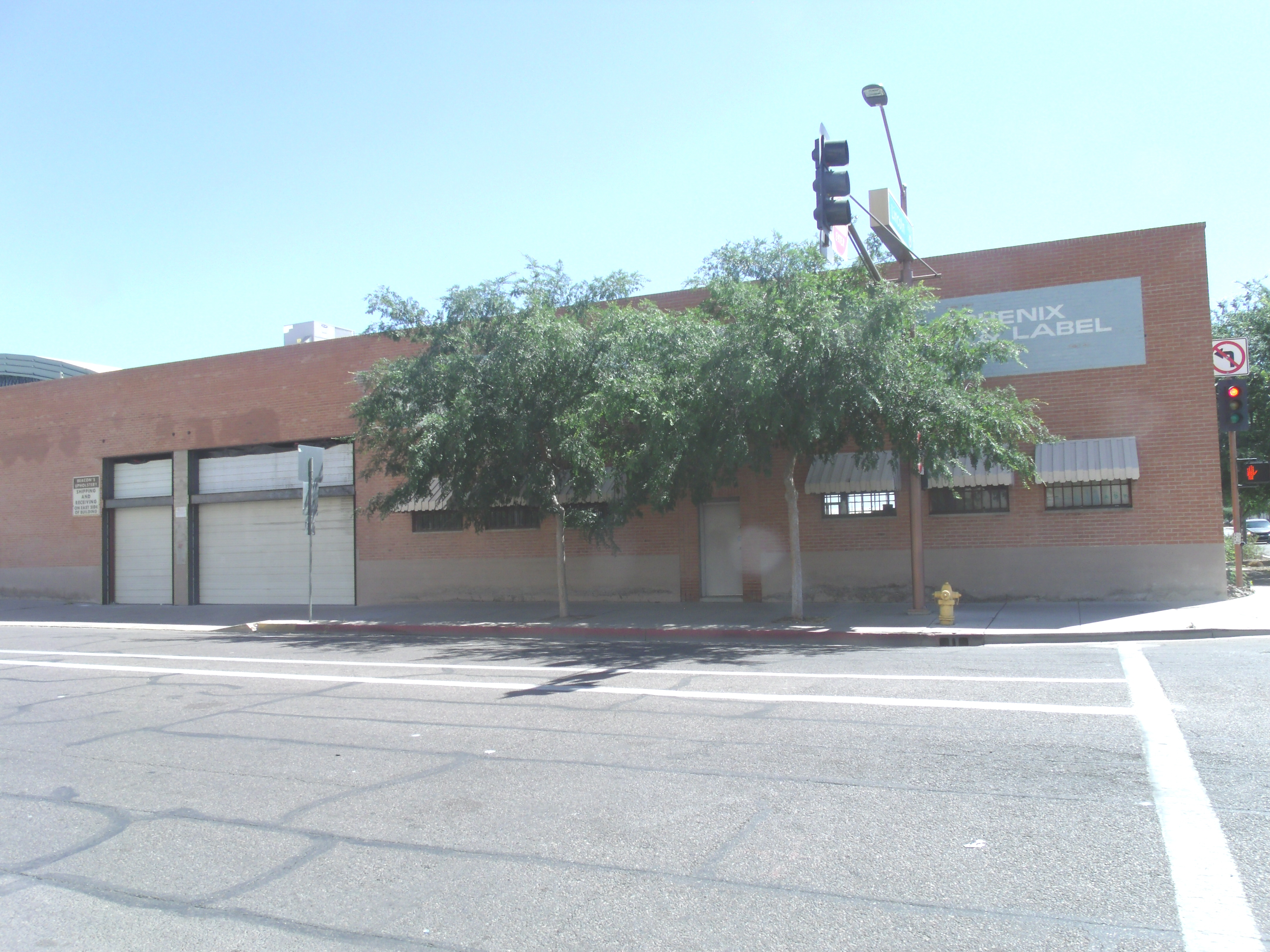
The Graham Paper Company Warehouse was built in 1949 and is located at 521 S. Third St. / 310 E. Lincoln St. It was listed in the Phoenix Historic Property Register in July 2009.

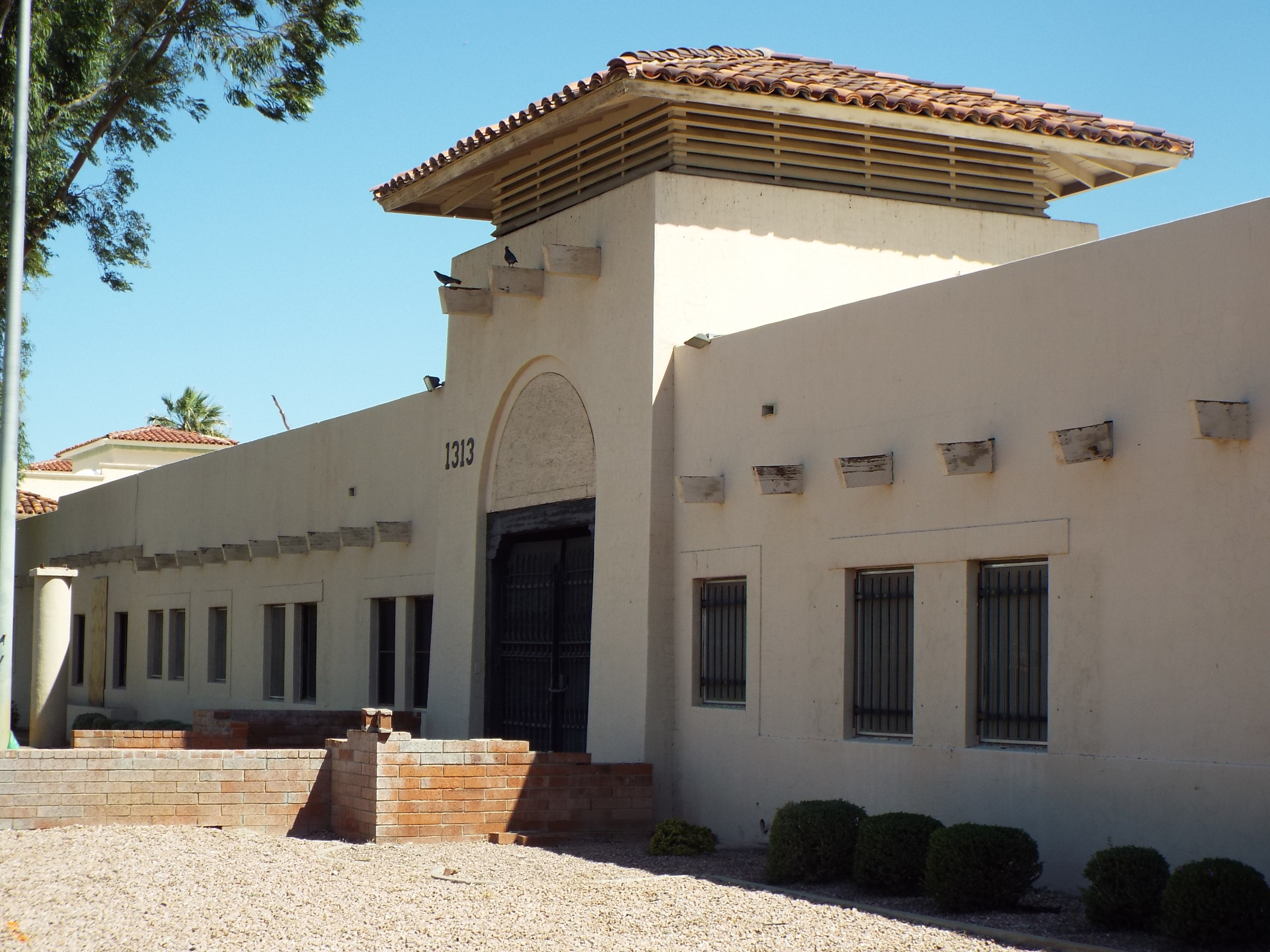
The Medical Center building was built in 1949. The property now houses Summit Elementary School. It is located at 1313 N. 2nd Street. The building is considered historical by the Phoenix Historic Preservation Office.

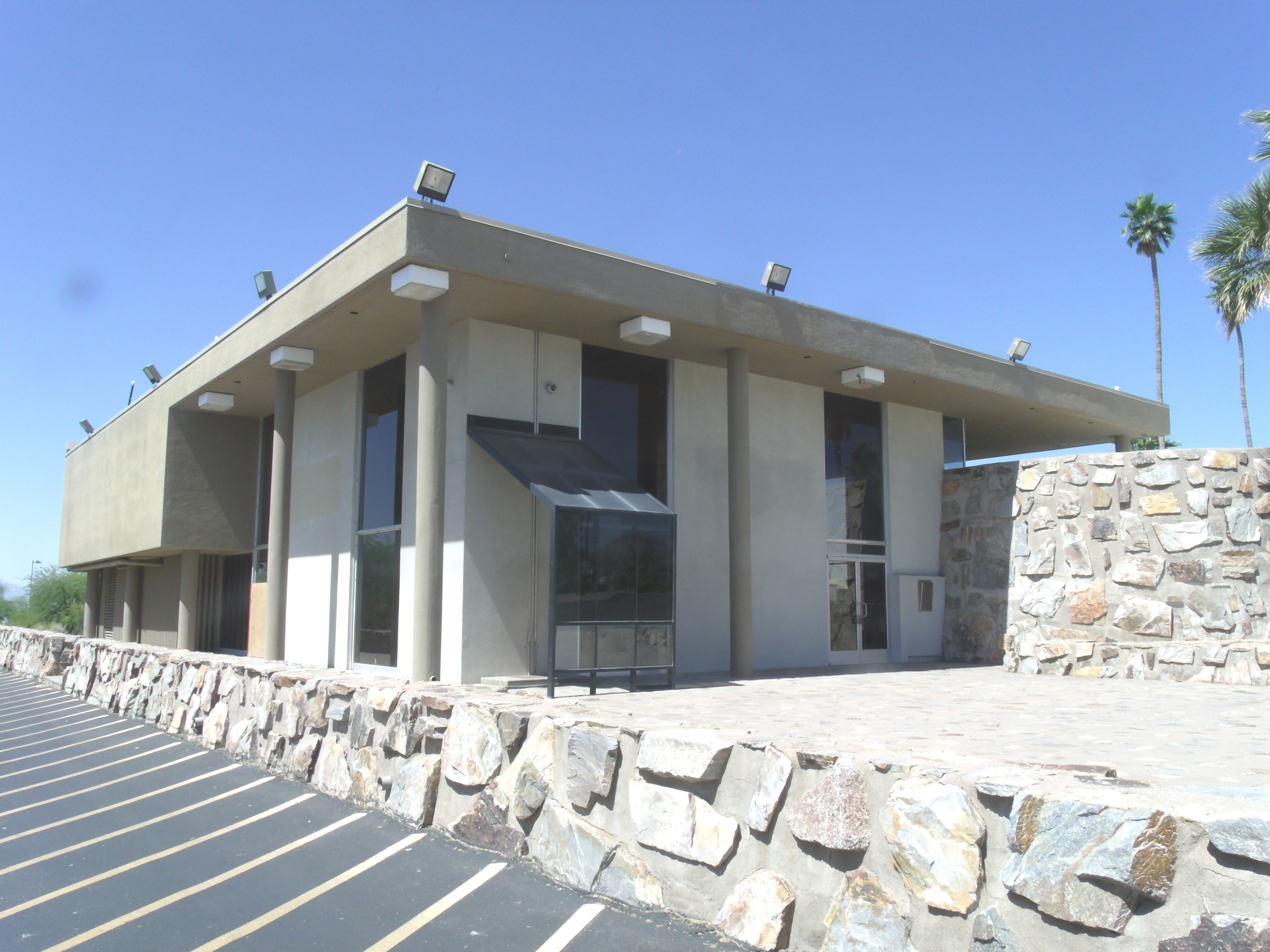
The Farmers & Stockmens Bank was built in 1950–1951 and is located at 5001 E. Washington St. It was listed in the Phoenix Historic Property Register in October 2004.

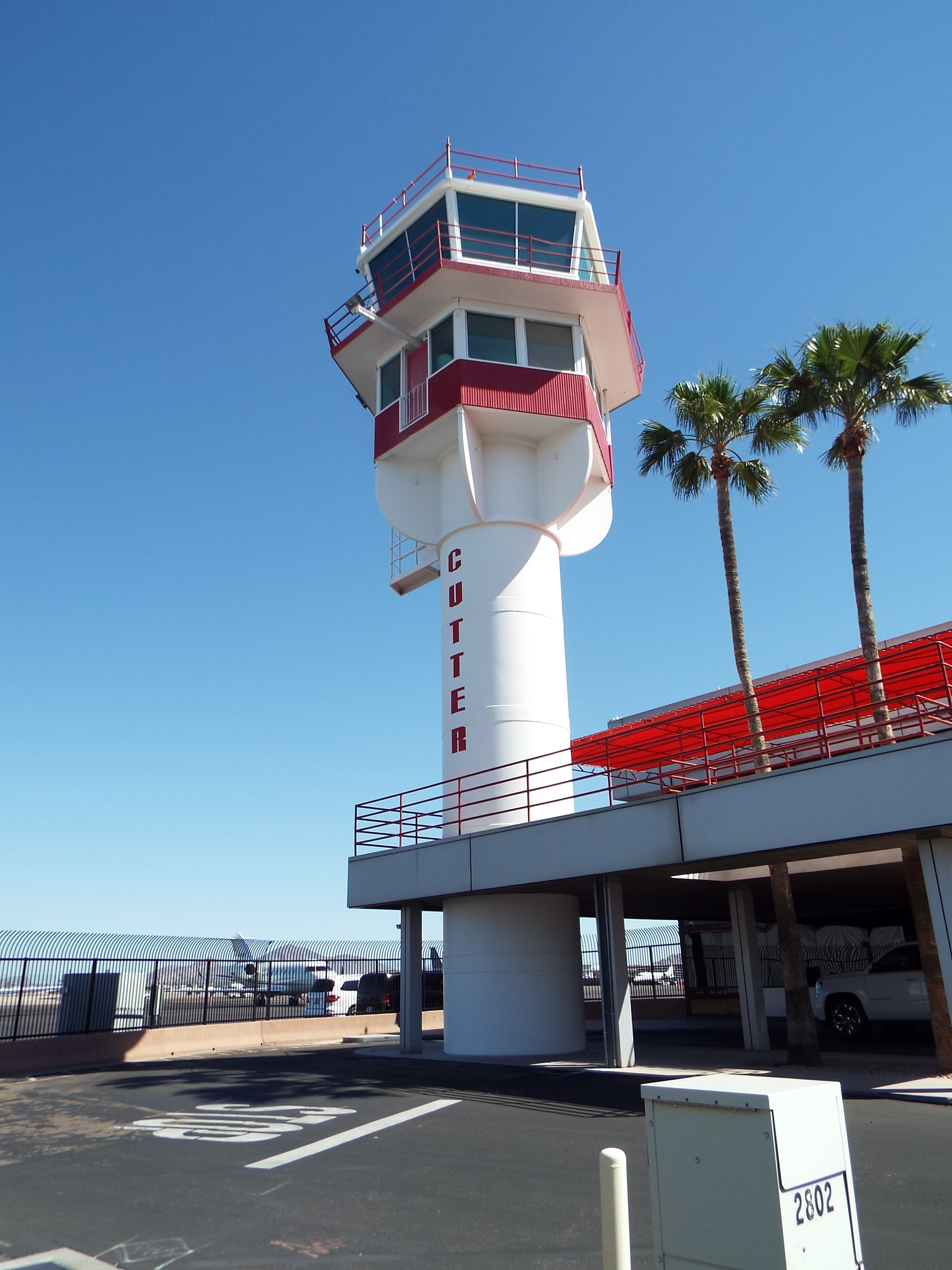
The original Sky Harbor Air Traffic Control Tower was built in 1952 along with Terminal 1. Terminal 1 was demolished in 1991 and the truncated iconic control tower was moved to 2768 East Old Tower Road, where it is currently located.

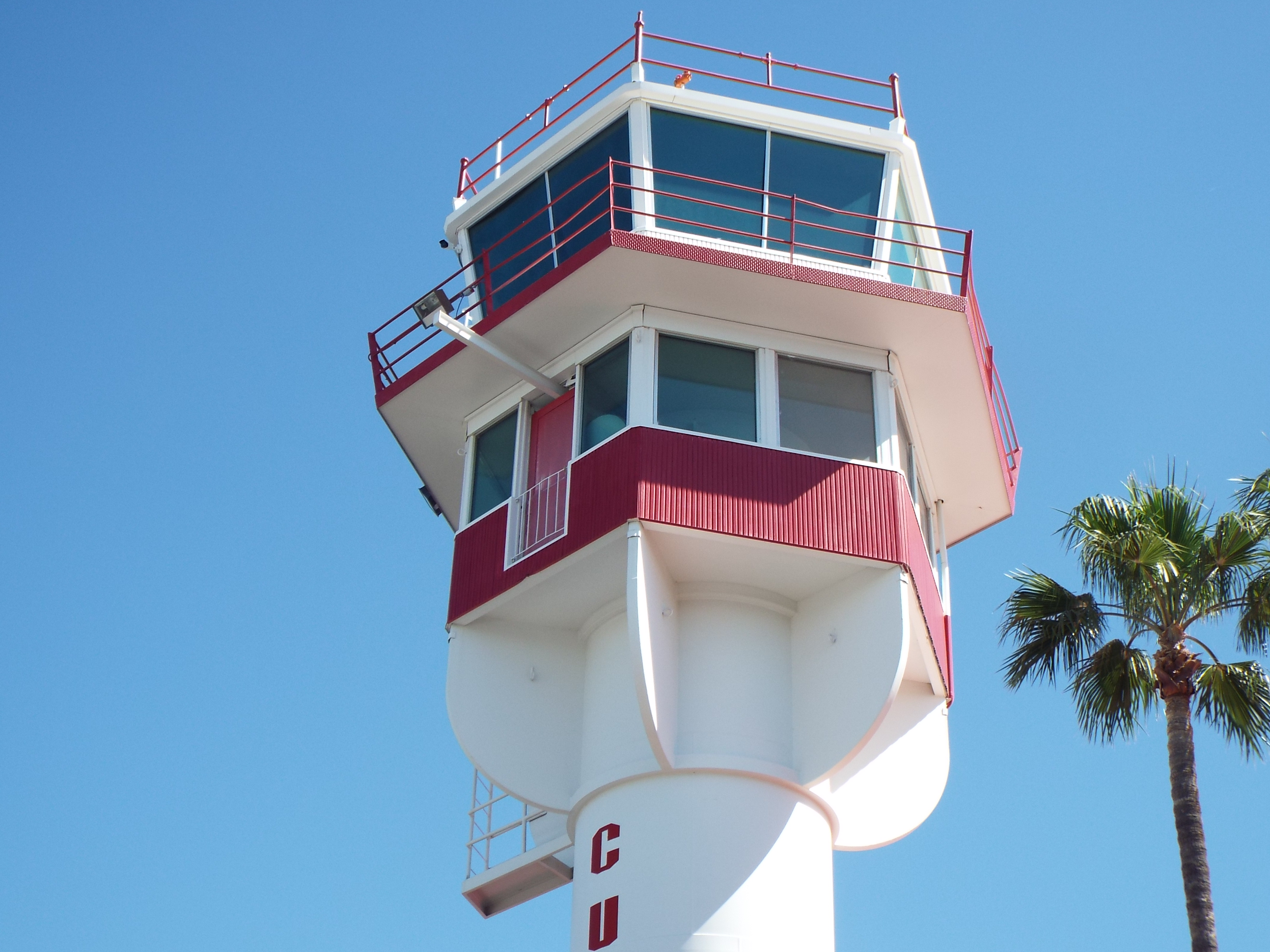
Close up view of the original Sky Harbor Air Traffic Control Tower.

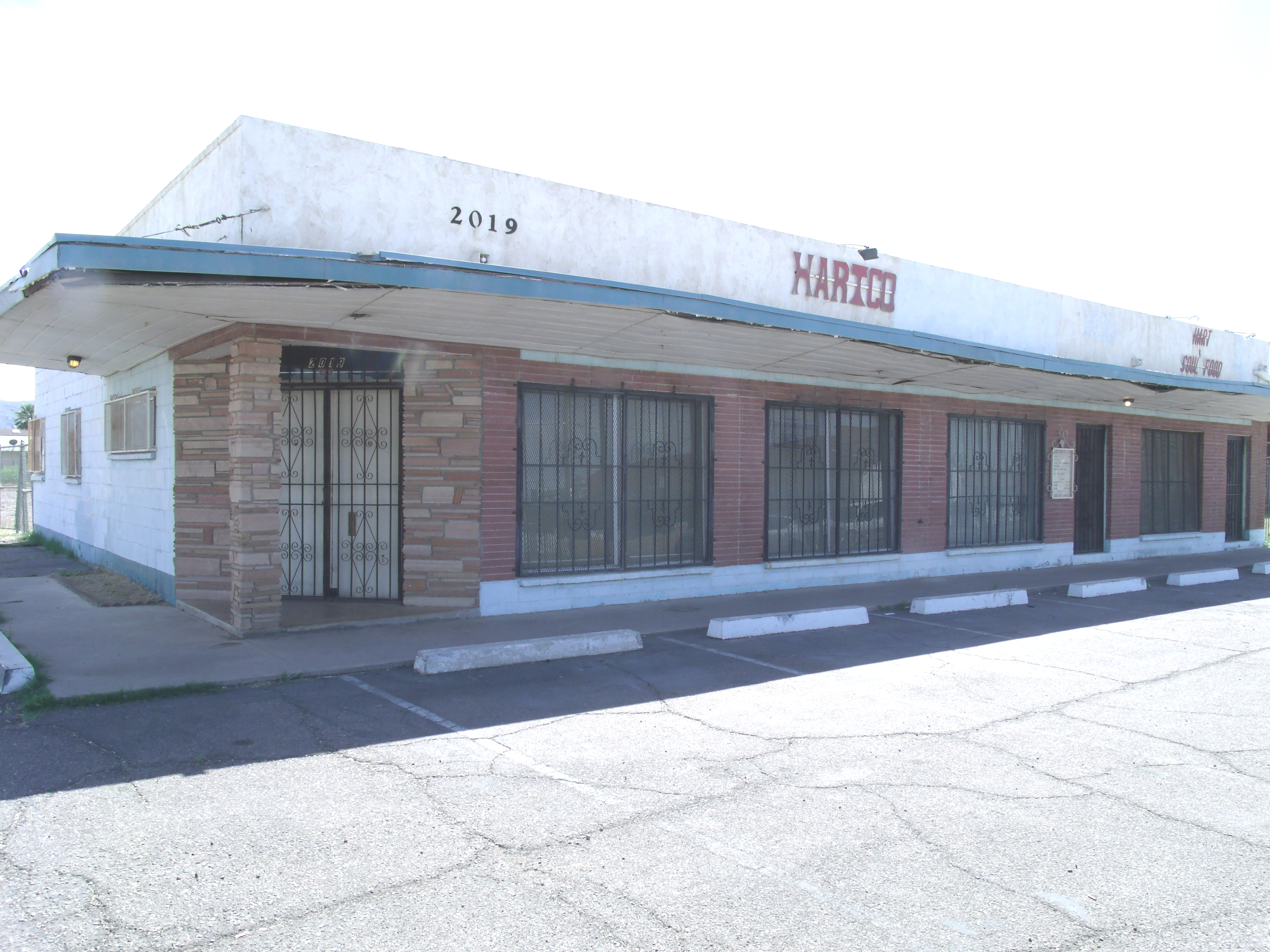
The Progressive Builders Association Building was built in 1953 and is located at 2019 E. Broadway Road. The Progressive Builders Association built homes in downtown Phoenix, giving many African Americans their first opportunity to buy a brand-new home. In 1945, members of the community met at the First Institutional Baptist Church and formed the Progressive Builders Association. It was listed as historic by the Phoenix African-American Survey and listed in the Phoenix Historic Property Register in June 2005.

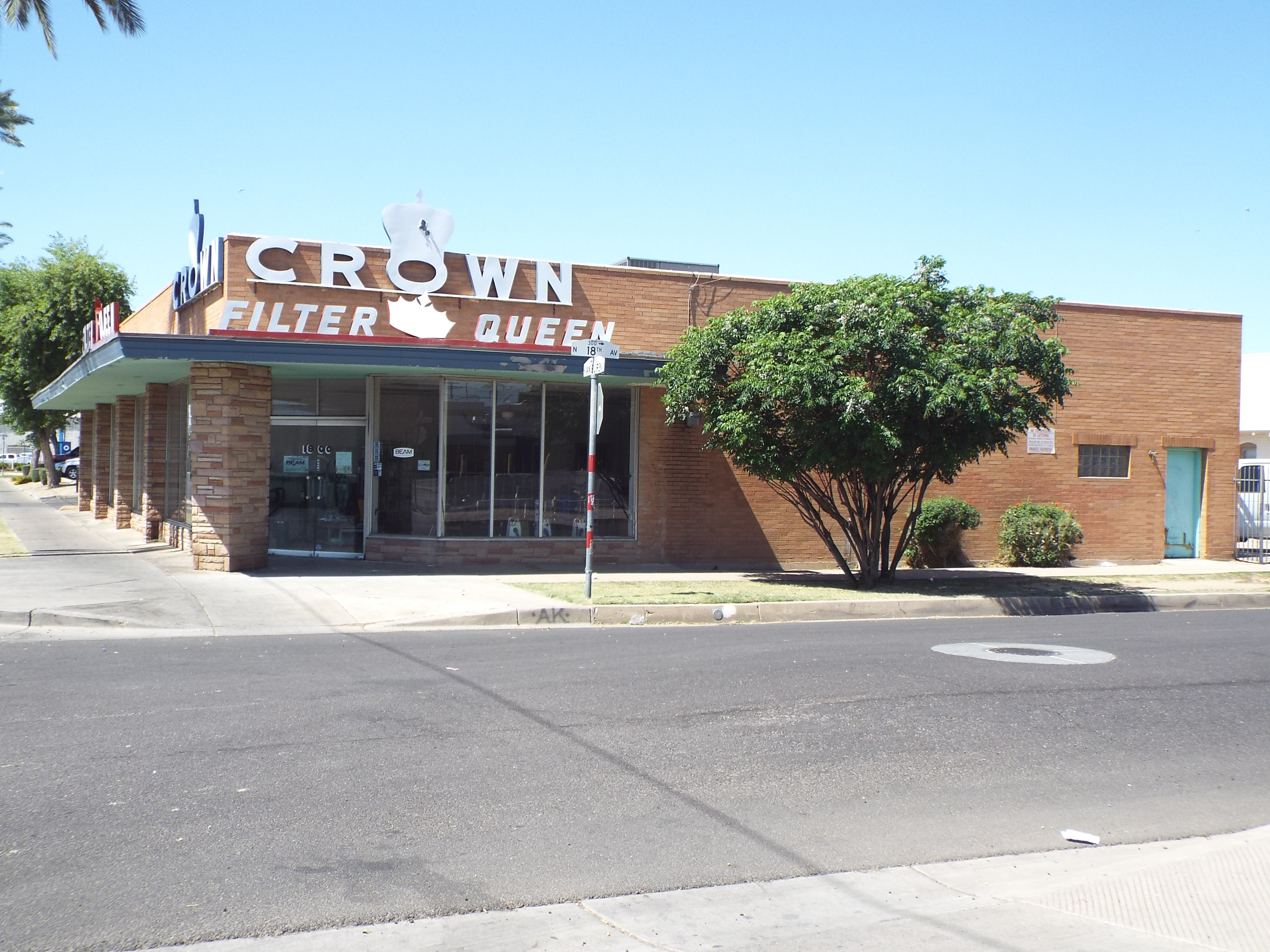
The Crown Filter Queen Building was built in 1955. It is located at 1800 W. Van Buren Avenue. The builders used clay brick and ashler sandstone. The building is listed in the National Register of Historic Places on July 10, 1992, reference #92000847, as part of the Oakland Historic District.

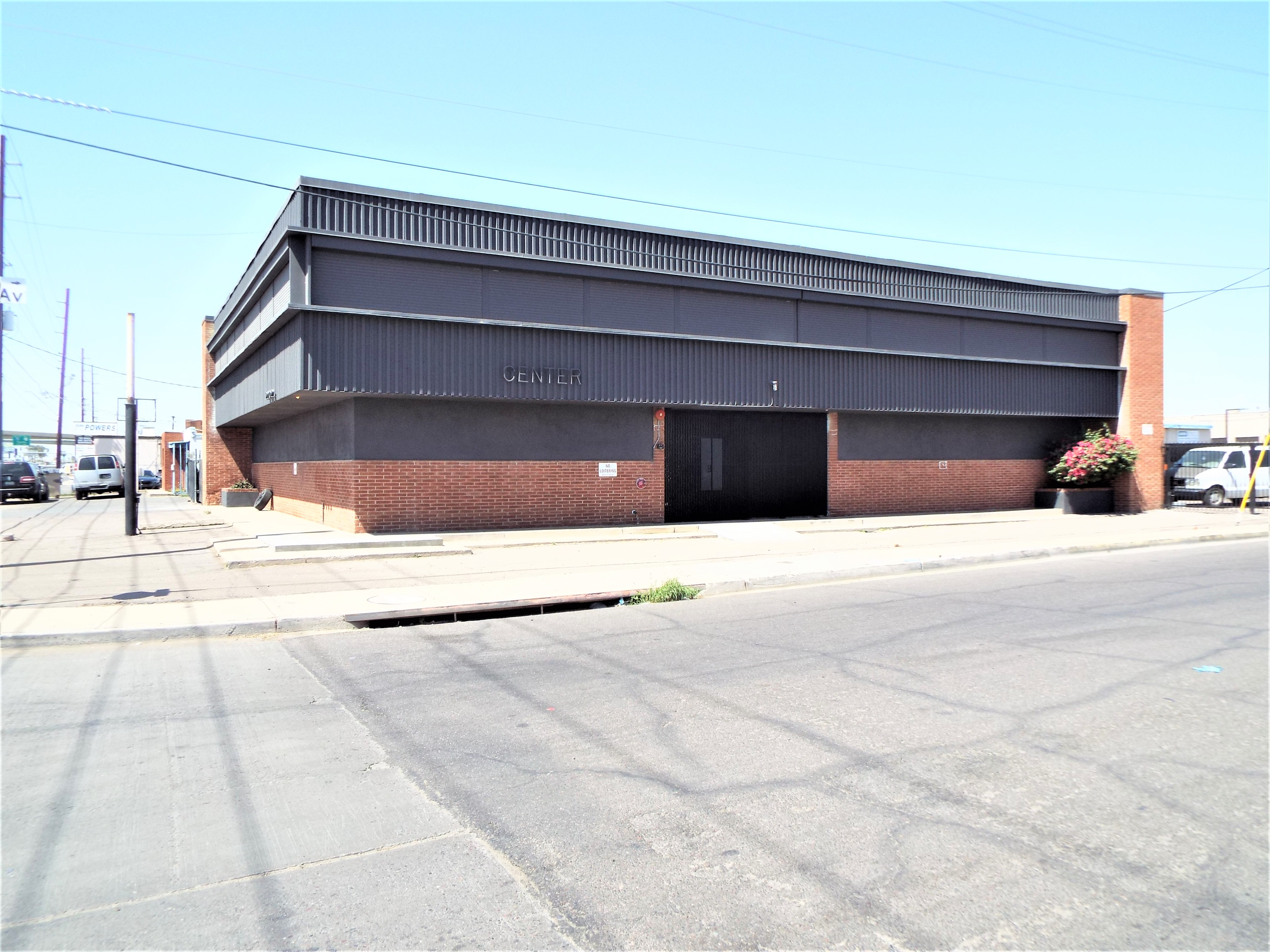
The Produce Center Building was builtin 1956 and is located at 2202 W. McDowell Road. It was listed in the Phoenix Historic Property Register in October 2020.

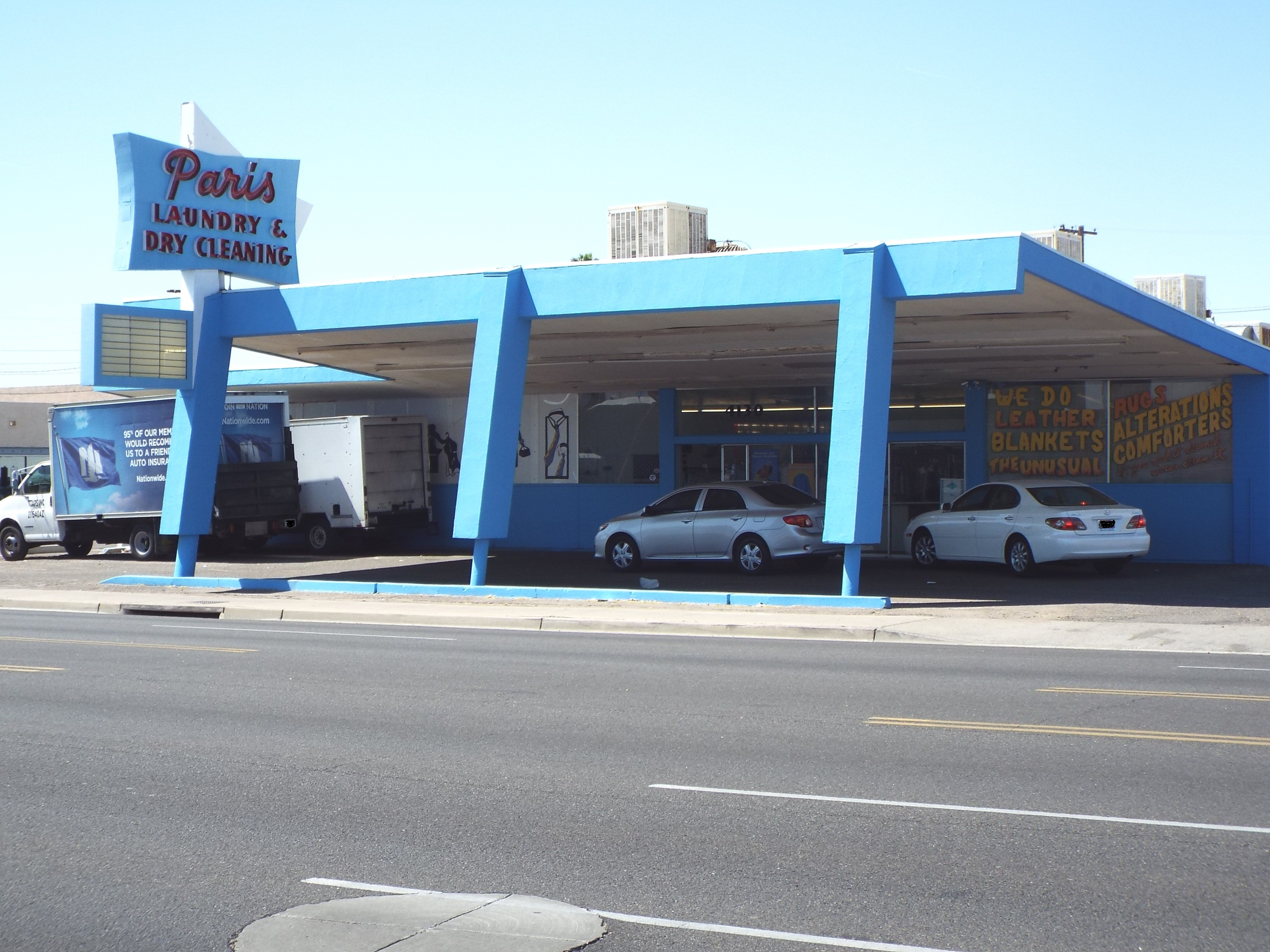
The Paris Laundry and Dry Cleaning Building was built in 1957. It is located 4130 N. 7h Avenue. This building was designed Googie style. Googie architecture is a form of modern architecture influenced by the Space Age and the Atomic Age. The building is considered historical by the Phoenix Historic Preservation Office.

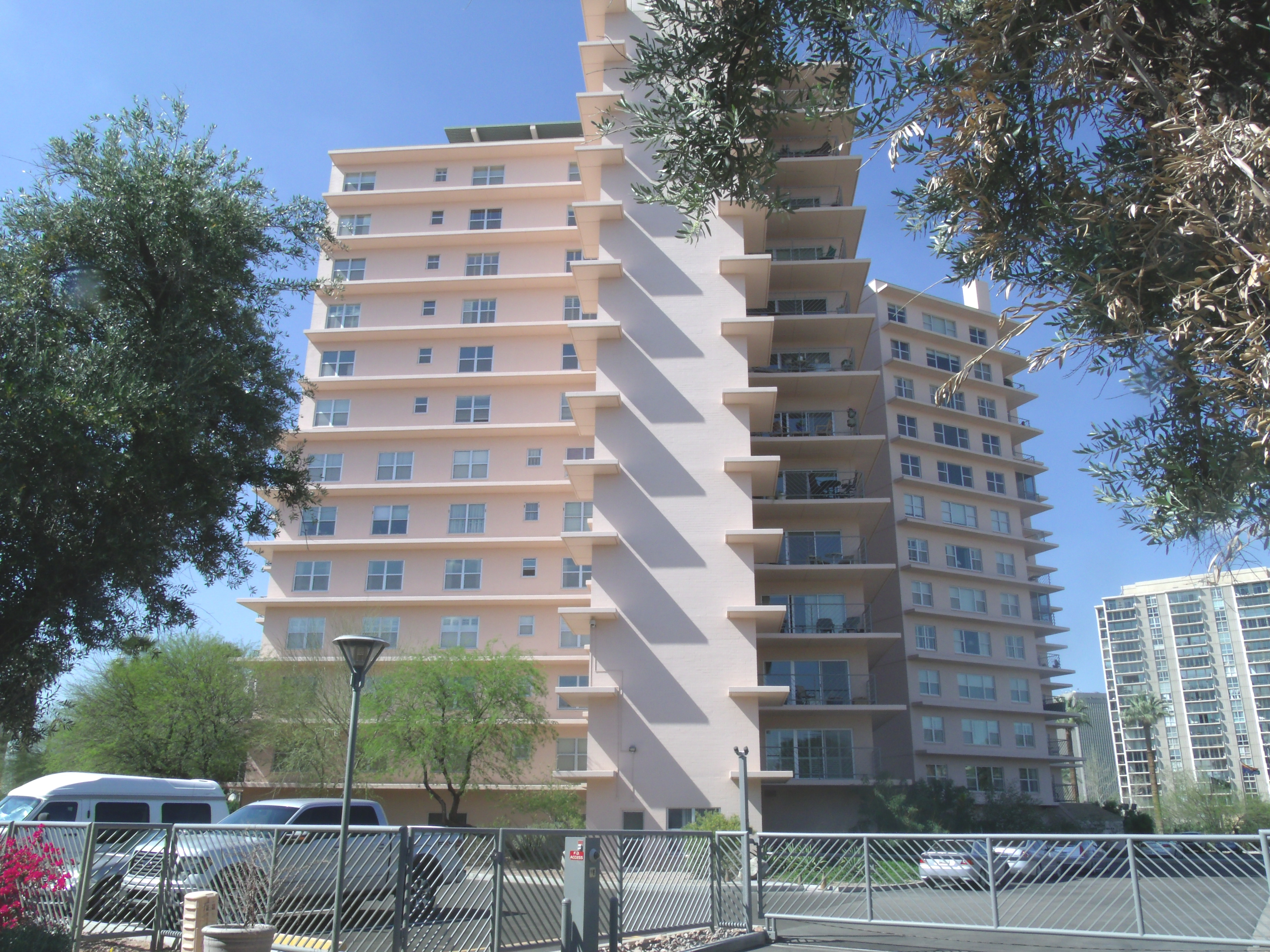
The Phoenix Towers were built in 1957 and are located at 2201 N. Central Avenue. Phoenix Towers was built as a resident-owned cooperative community, Phoenix Towers is now considered an outstanding example of mid-century architecture and was listed in the National Register of Historic Places on January 2, 2008, reference #07001334.

Front view of the Phoenix Towers. The towers were built in 1957 and are located at 2201 N. Central Avenue. Phoenix Towers was built as a resident-owned cooperative community, Phoenix Towers is now considered an outstanding example of mid-century architecture and was listed in the National Register of Historic Places on January 2, 2008, reference #07001334.

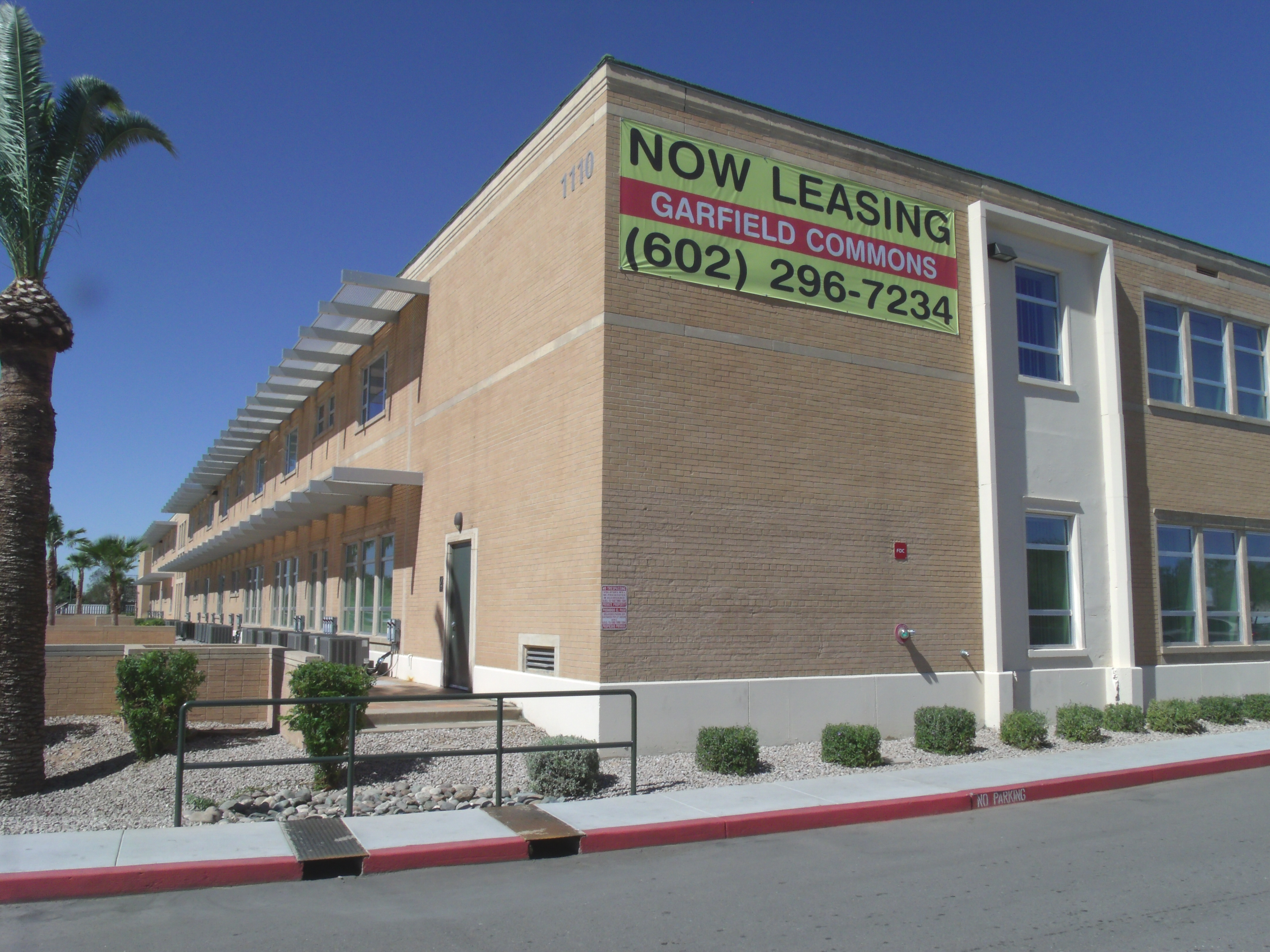
The Sacred Heart House for the Aged was built in 1958 and is located at 1110 N. 16th Street. On February 2, 2010, the building was listed in the National Register of Historic Places, reference: #05001548.

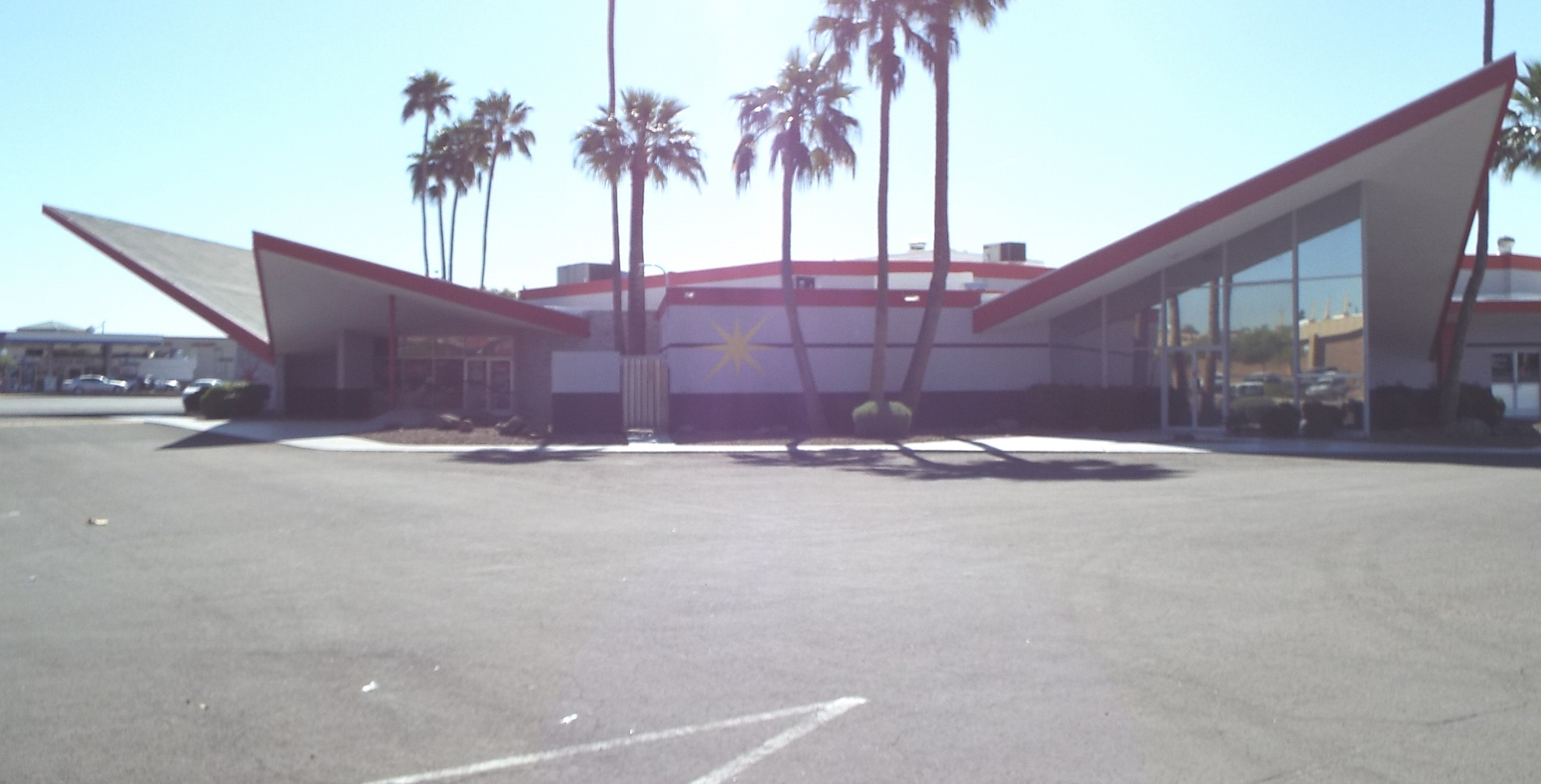
The 300 Bowl building, which now houses the AMF Christown Lanes, was built in 1960. It is located 1911 W. Bethany Home Road. The three point roofline pegs this building as Googie architecture in style. Googie architecture is a form of modern architecture influenced by the Space Age, and the Atomic Age. The building is considered historical by the Phoenix Historic Preservation Office.

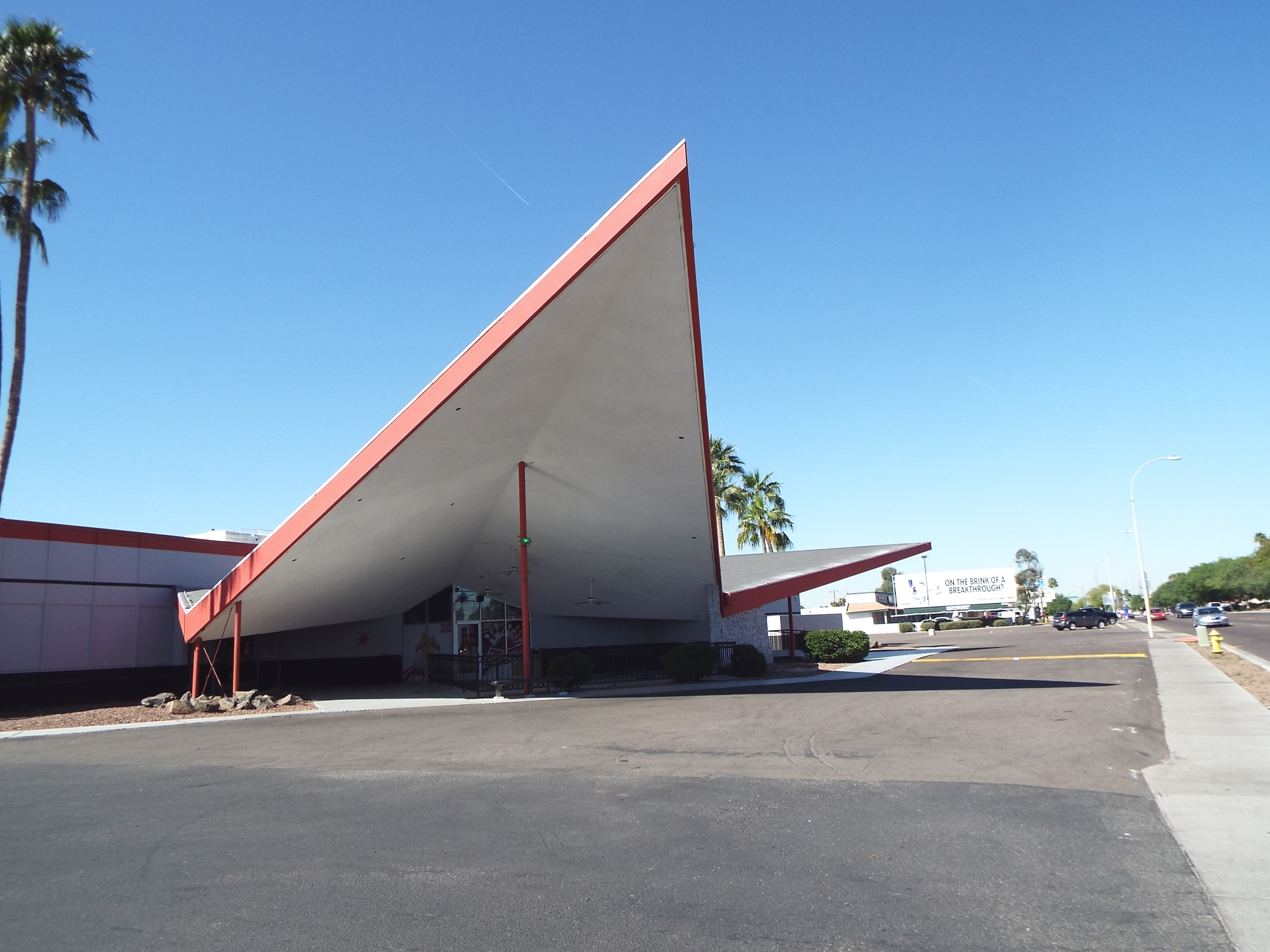
Different view of the 300 Bowl building.

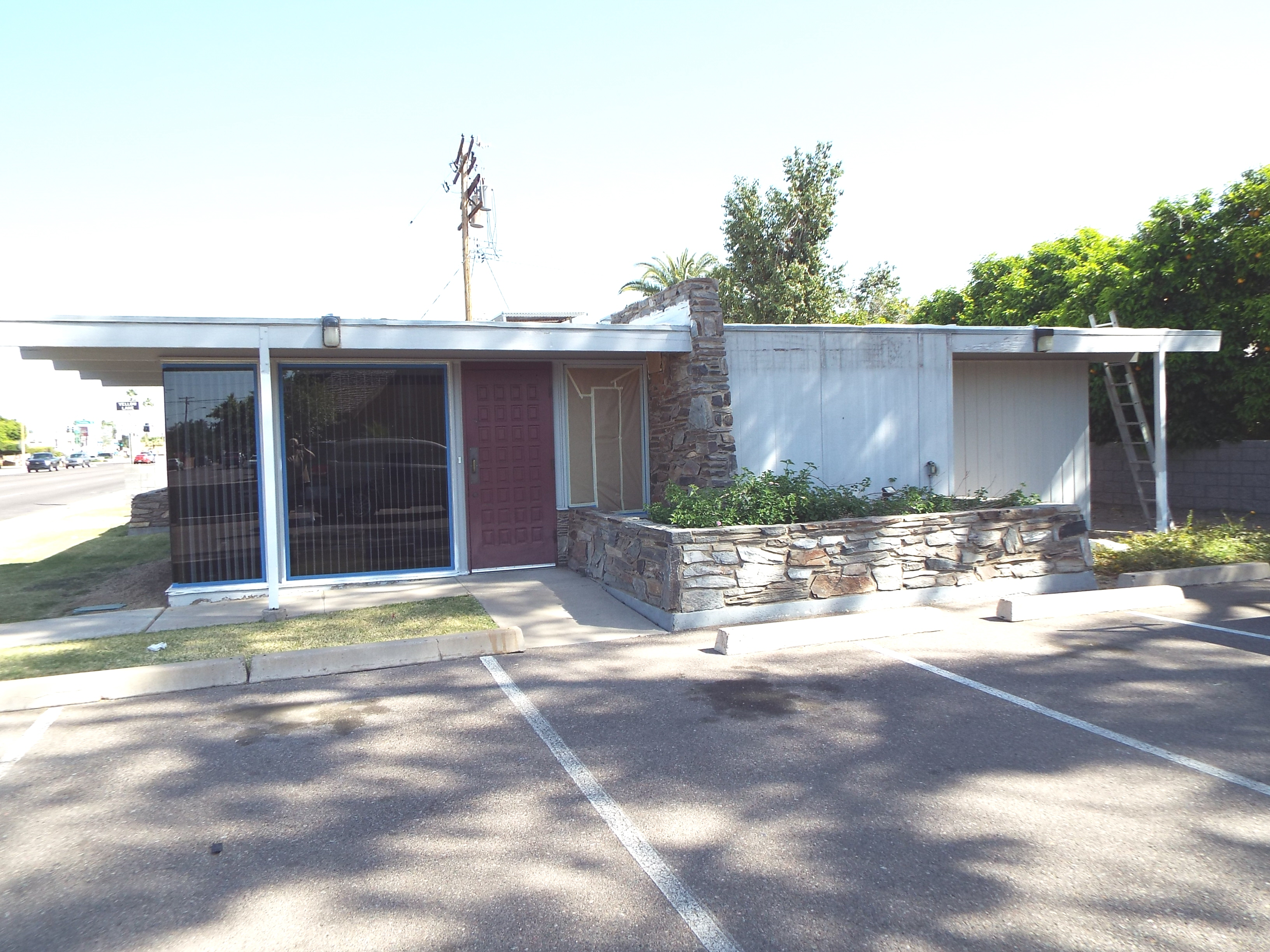
The Conn and Candlin CPA Office was built in 1962. It is located at 2701 N. 7th Avenue. On January 9, 1991, the building was listed in the National Register of Historic Places, reference #90002099, as part of the Willo Historic District.

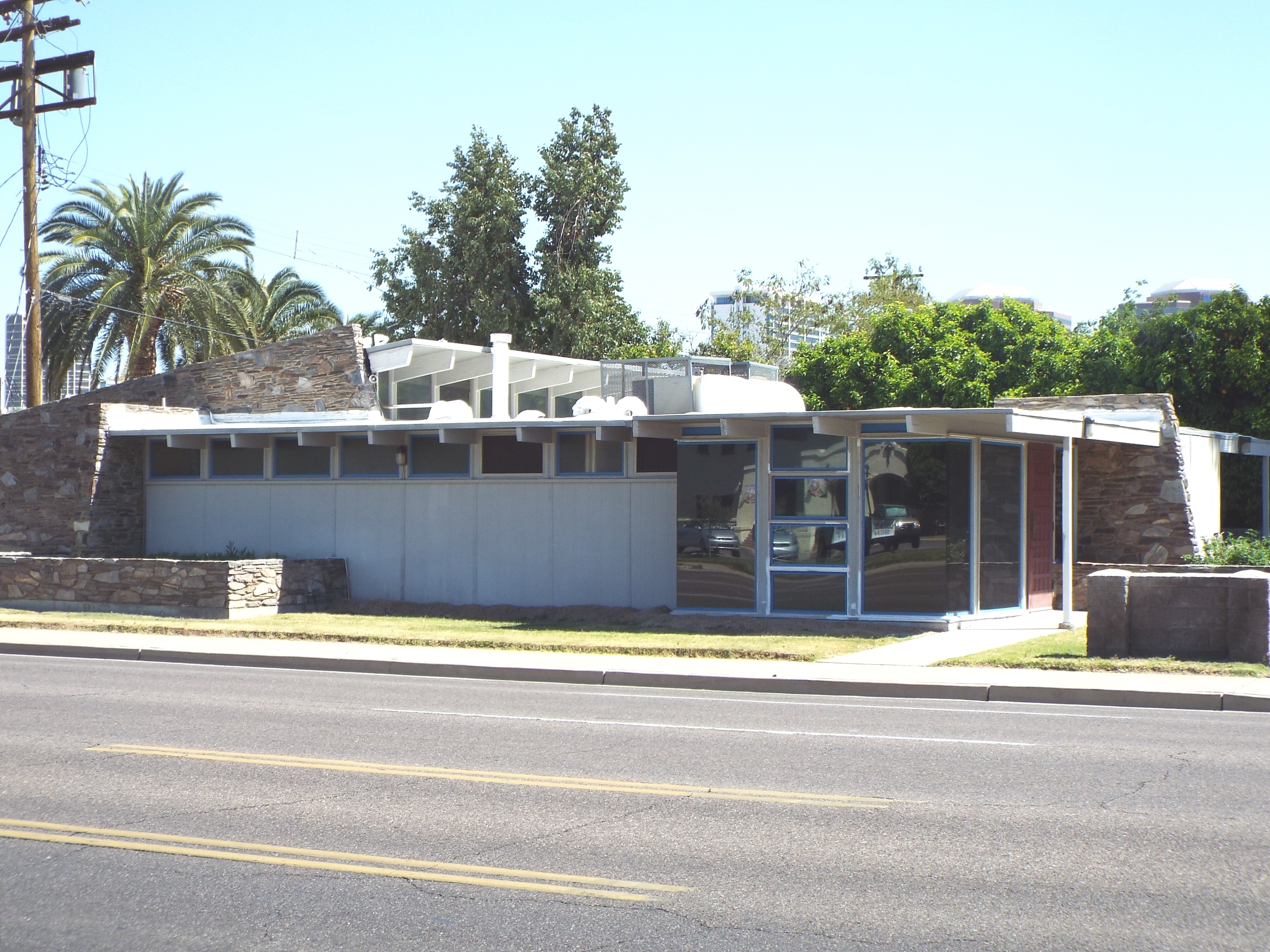
Side view of the Conn and Candlin CPA Office.

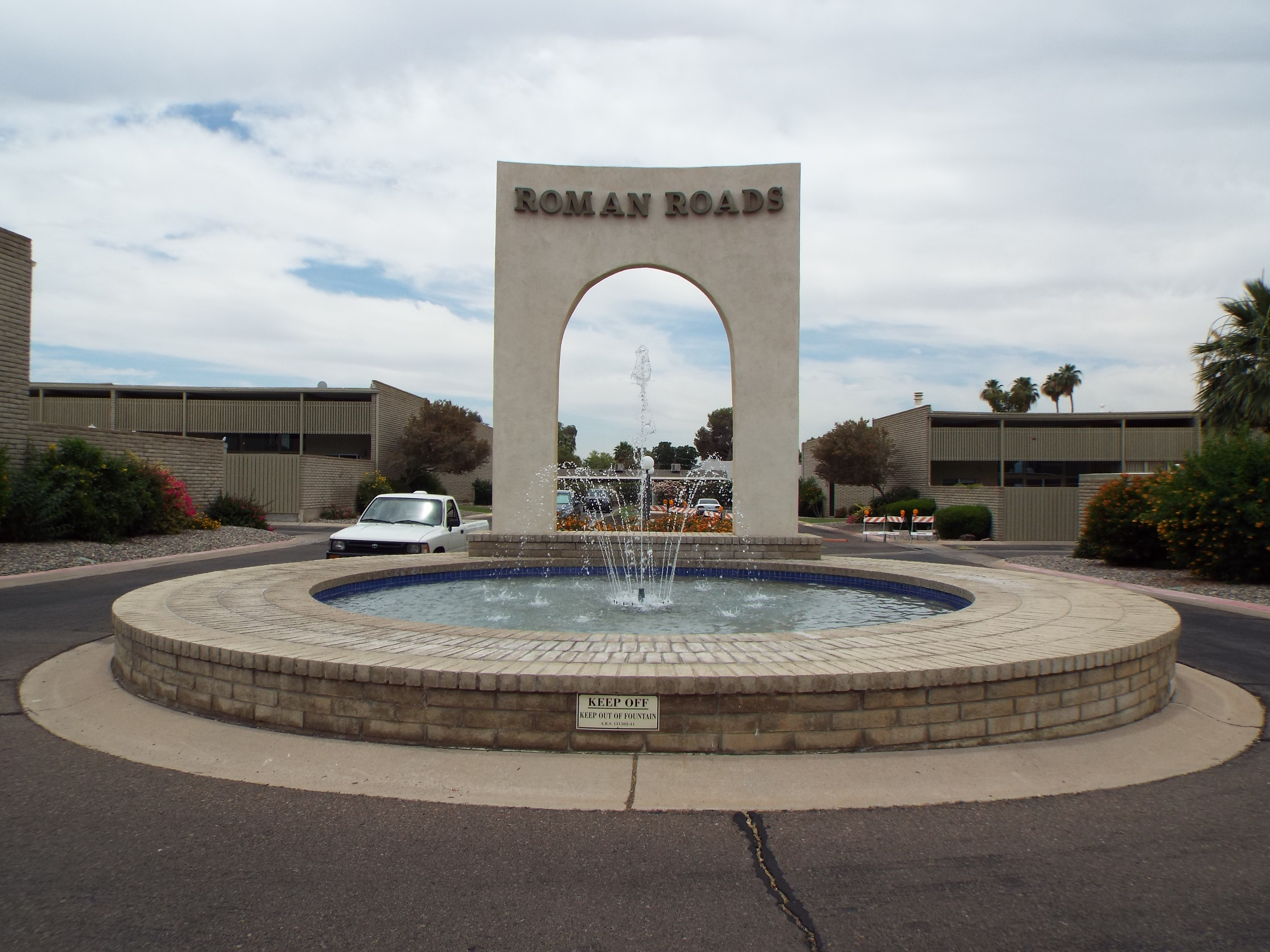
The Roman Roads built in 1962 and located at 1691 E Maryland Avenue. It was listed in the National Register of Historic Places on November 21, 2018, reference #100003124.

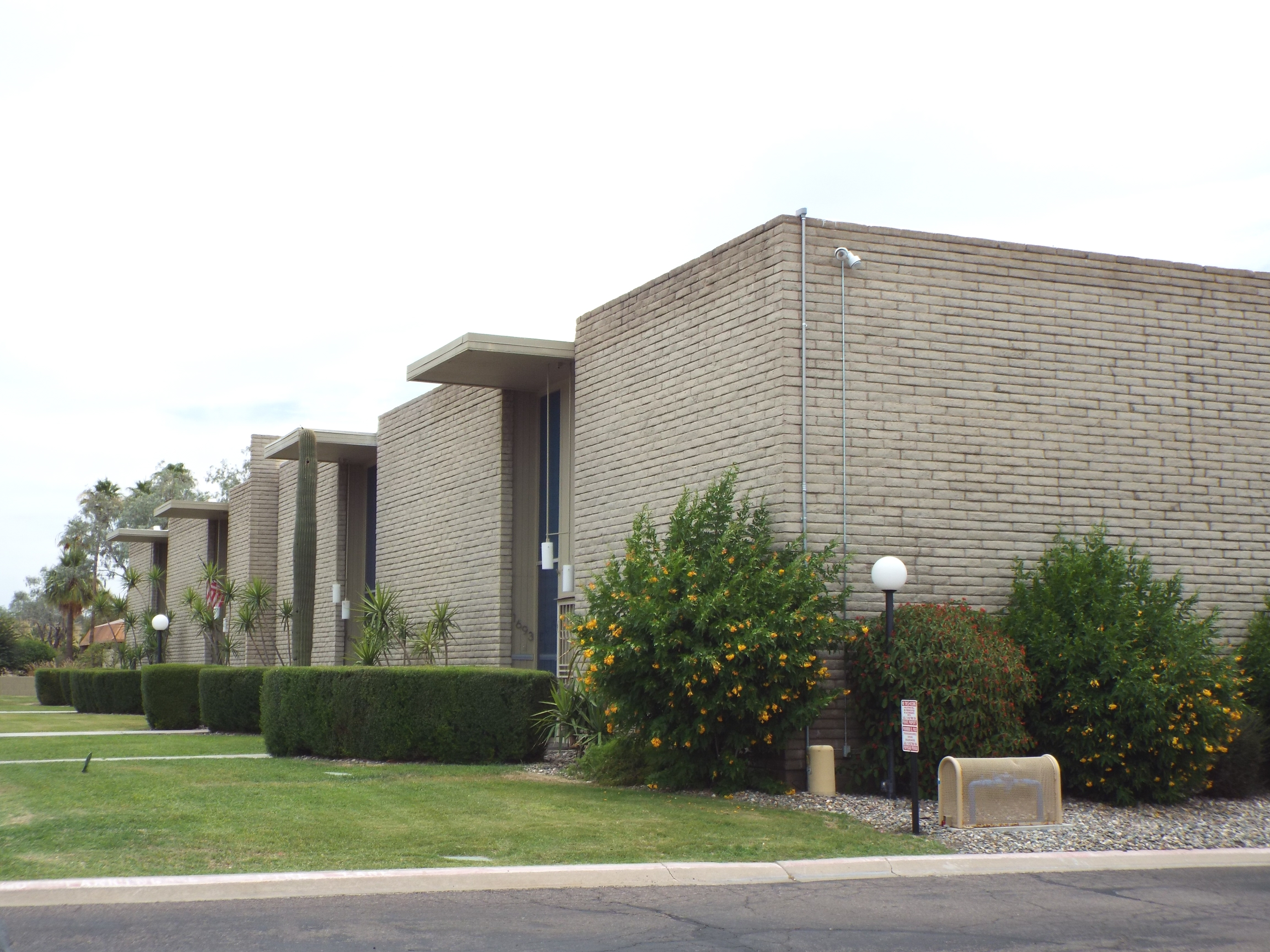
The Roman Roads

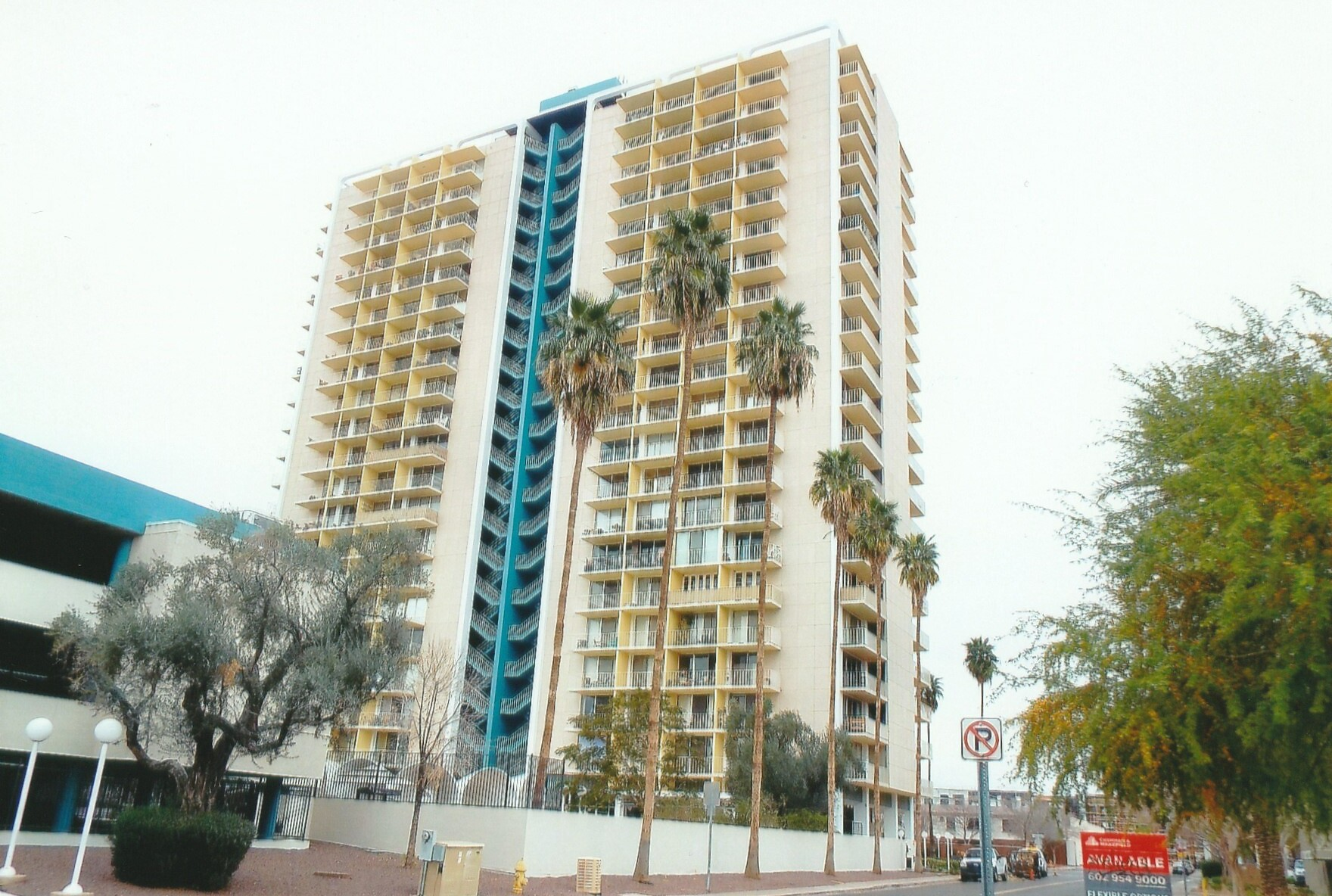
The Executive Towers were built in 1962 and are located at 207 West Clarendon Street. It was listed in the National Register of Historic Places on January 17, 2017, reference # 100000455.

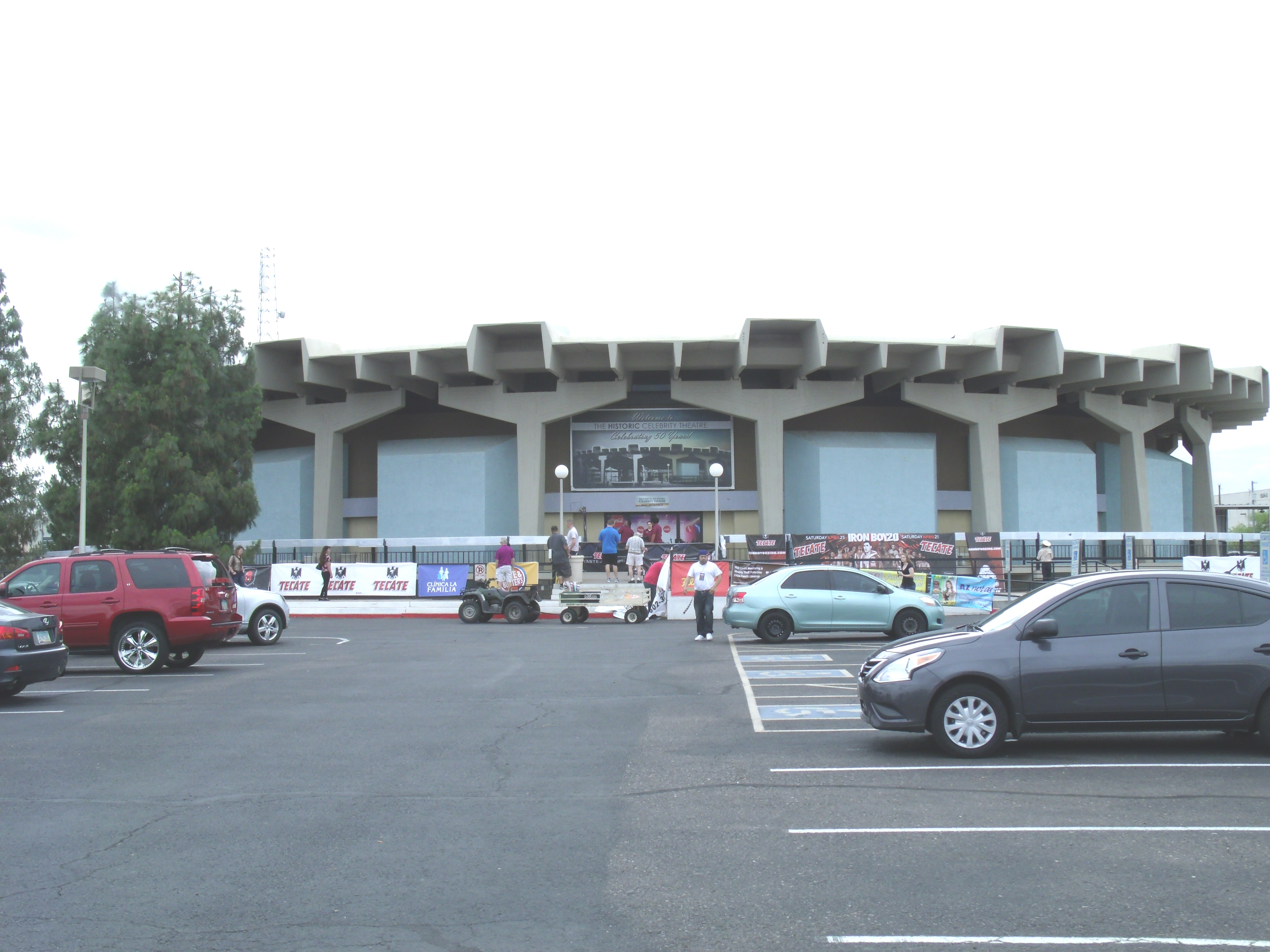
The Phoenix Star Theatre a.k.a. Celebrity Theatre was built in 1963 and is located 440 N. 32nd St. It was listed in the Phoenix Historic Property Register in September 2013.

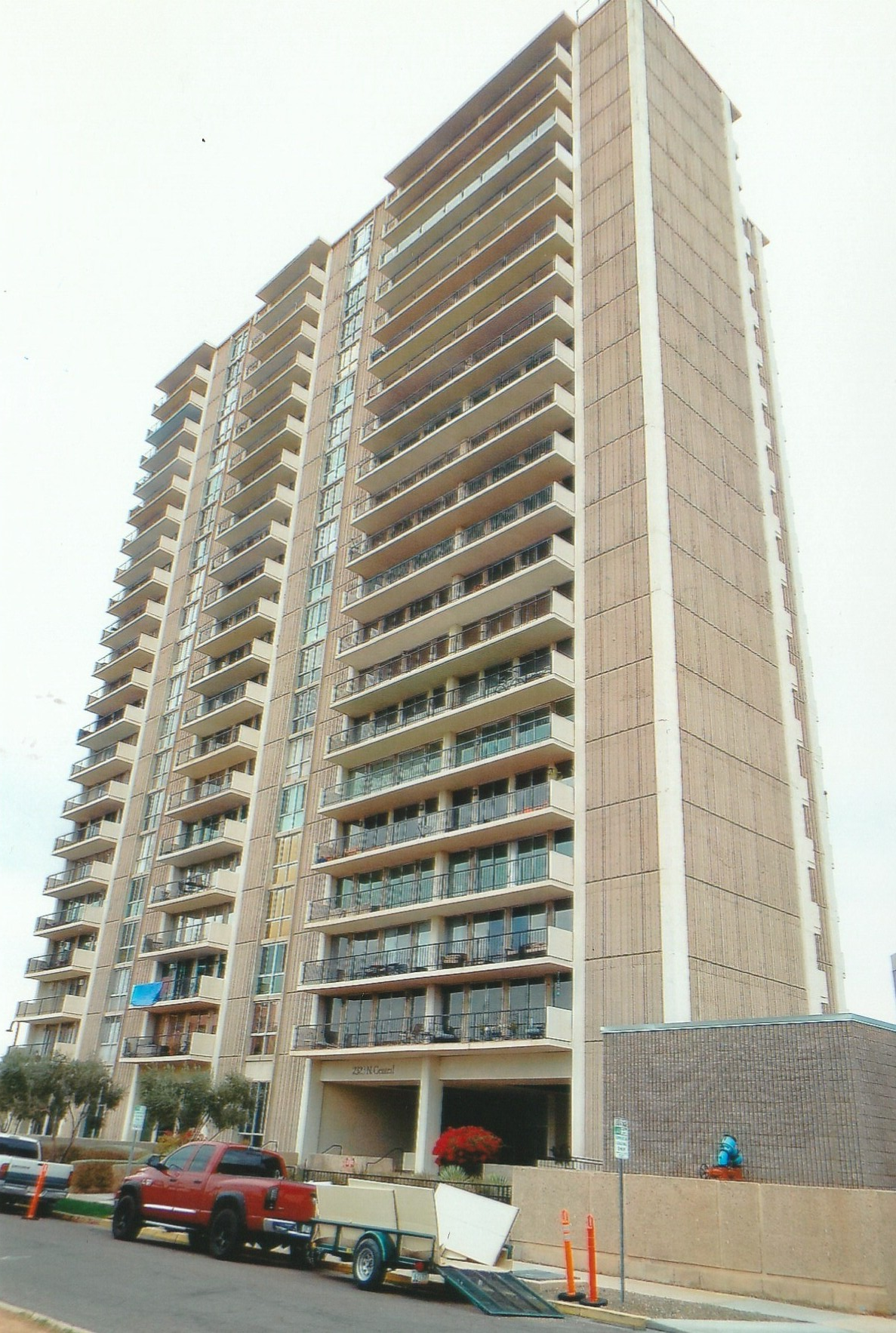
The Regency House was built in 1964 and is located at 2323 North Central Avenue. It was listed in the National Register of Historic Places on September 26, 2016, reference # 16000630.

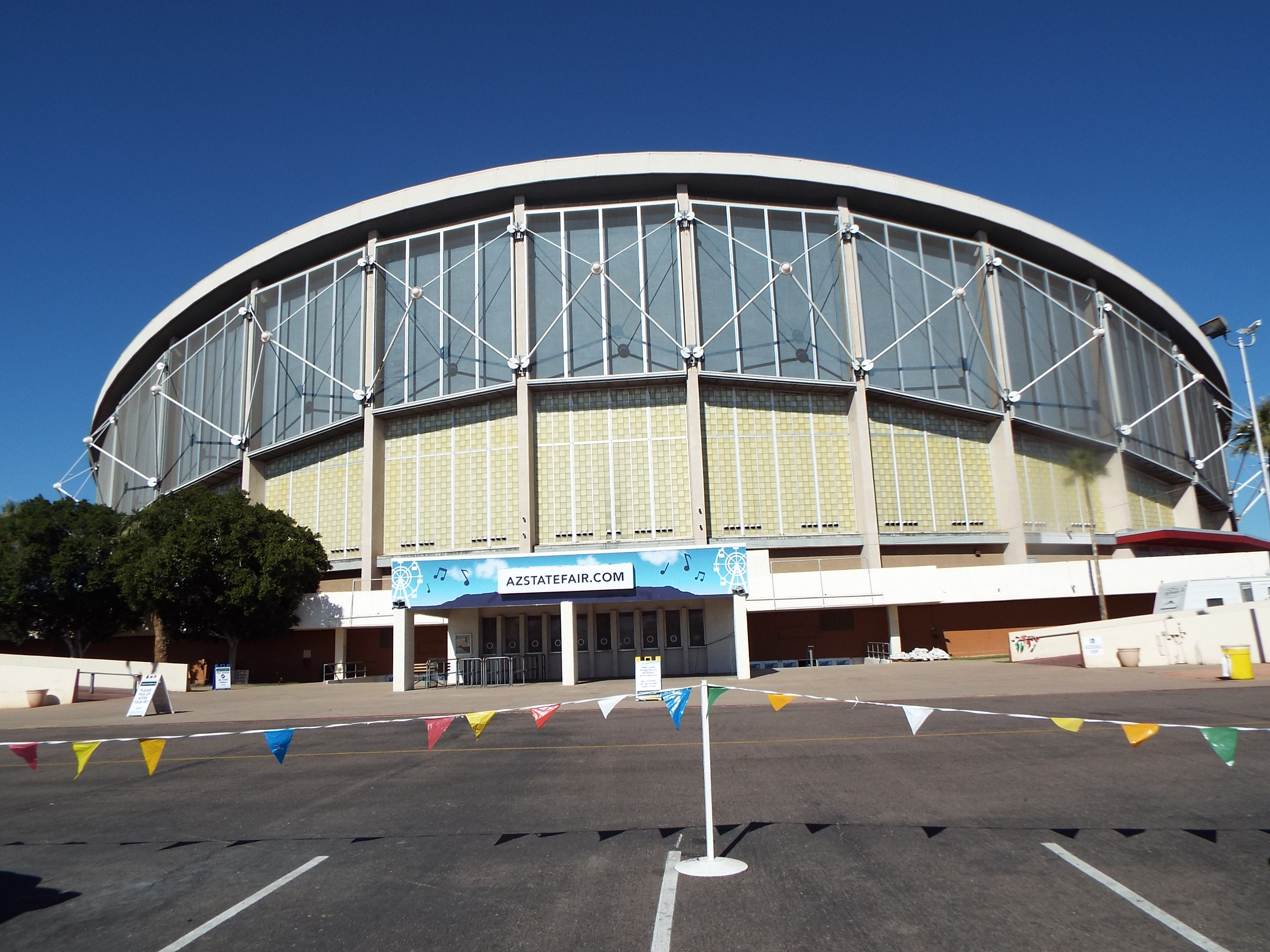
Arizona Veterans Memorial Coliseum built in 1965 and located at and located at 1826 W. McDowell Road. The coliseum served as the home of the Phoenix Suns from 1968 to 1992. The Monkees performed there in 1967 and so did Elvis Presley in 1970 and 73.

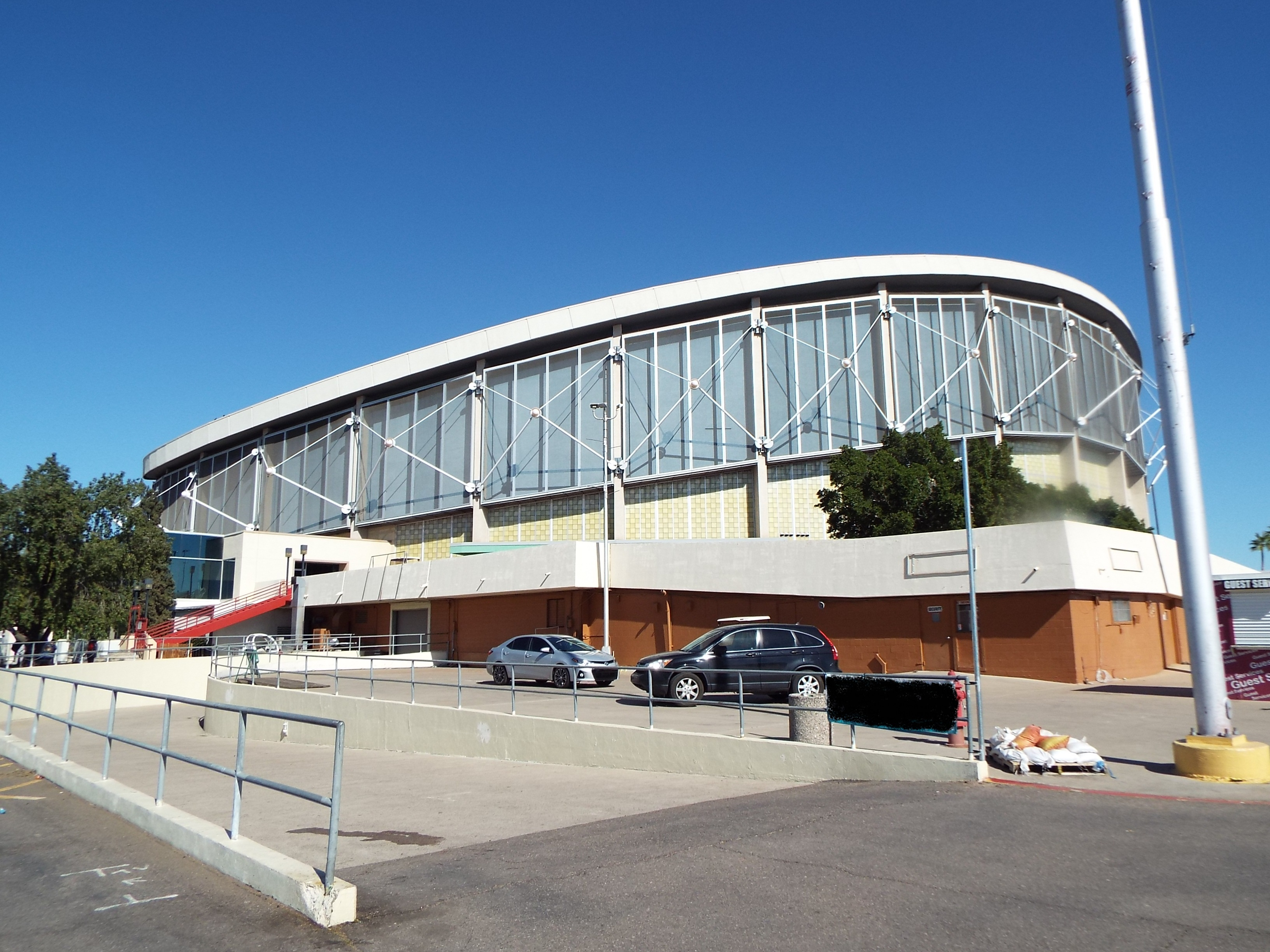
Different view of the Arizona Veterans Memorial Coliseum. On February 2, 1980, boxing Hall of Famer, Salvador Sanchez won the WBC World featherweight title when he beat Danny Lopez. Both Pope John Paul II (Sept. 14, 1987) and Mother Teresa (1989) made appearances there. Among the U.S. presidents that have visited the coliseum are Richard Nixon and Barack Obama.

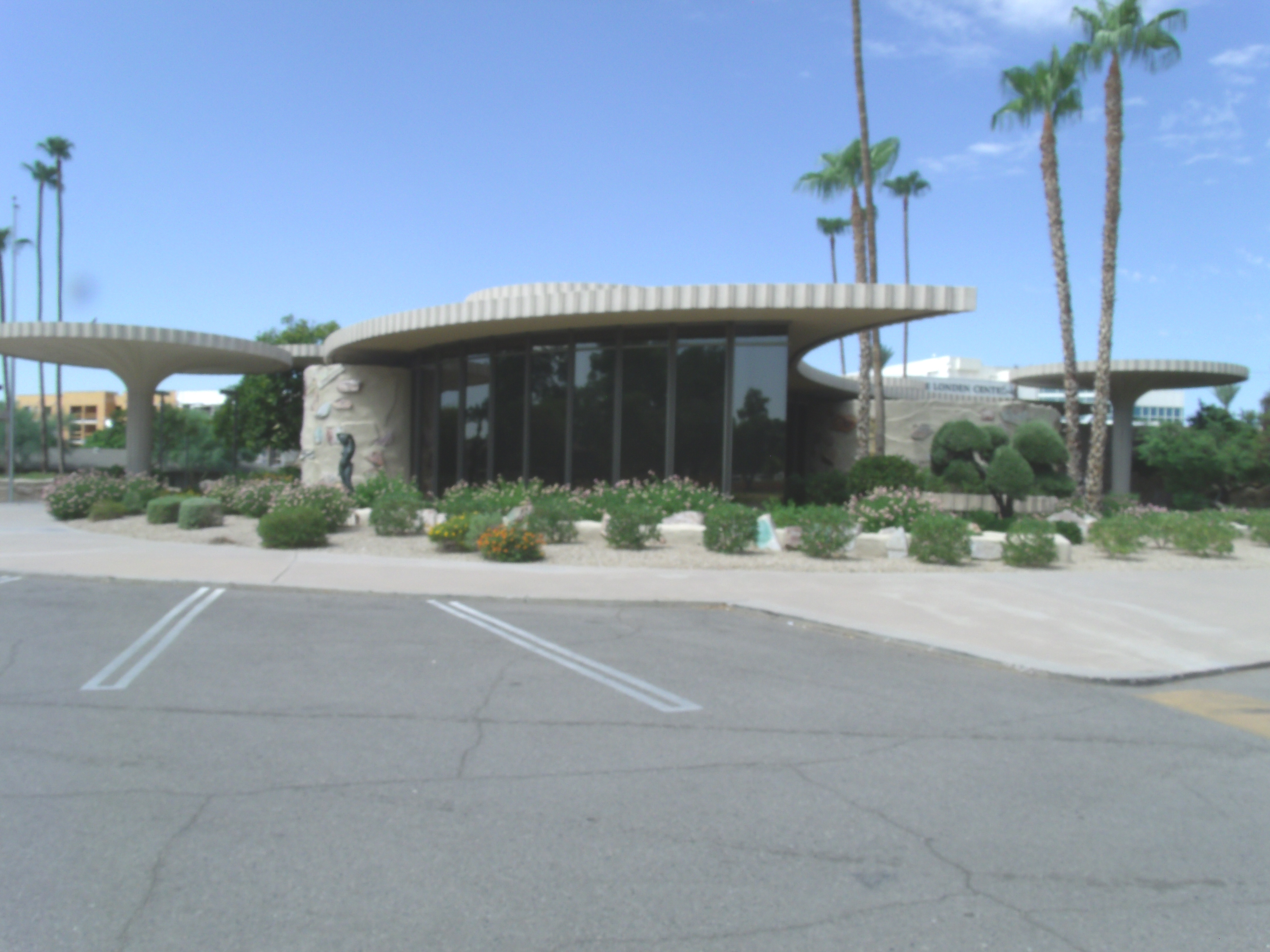
The Valley National Bank building was built in 1968 and is located at 4401 E. Camelback Road in Phoenix. The building was designed by Frank Henry. It is listed in the Phoenix Historic Property Register.

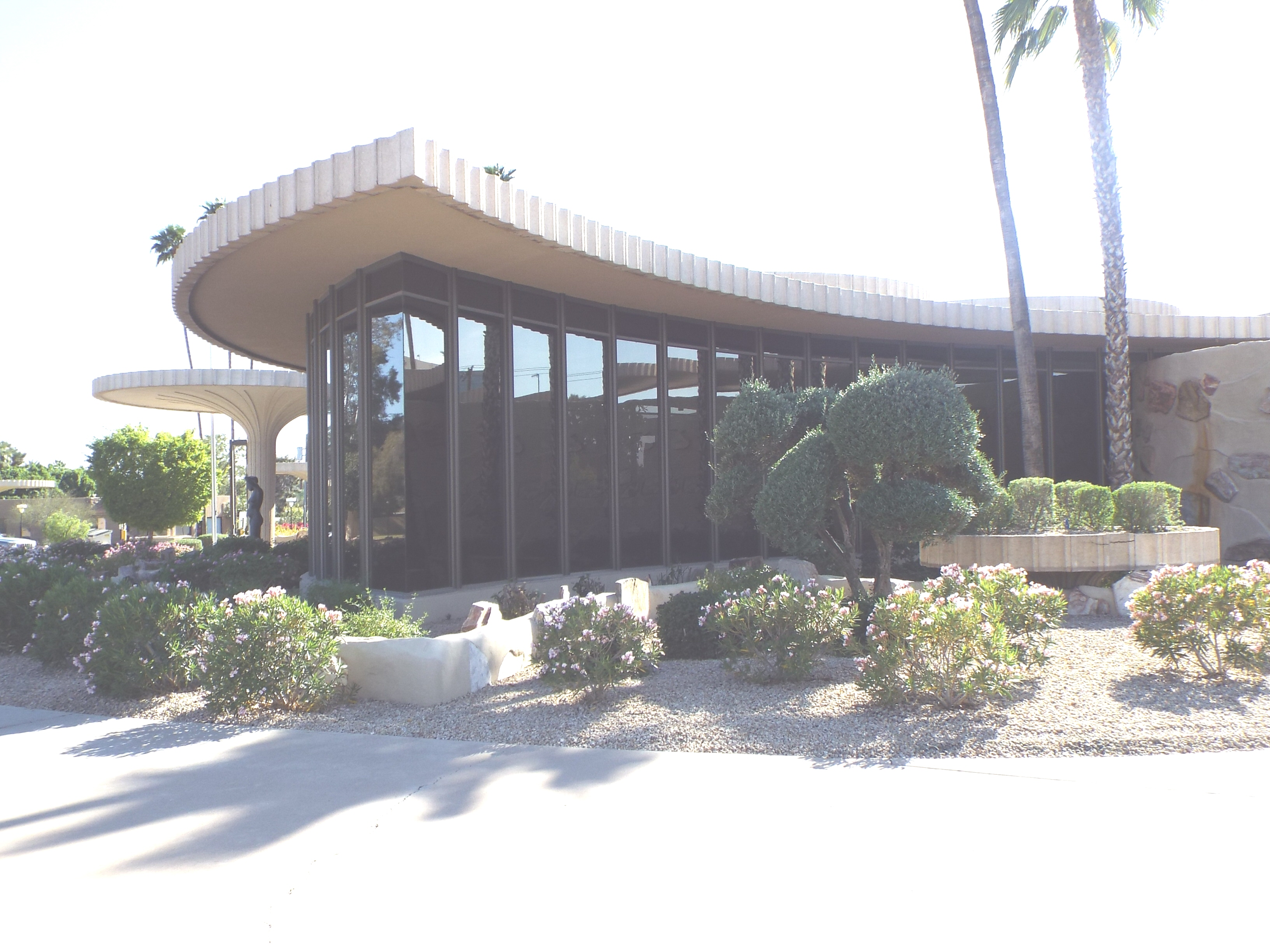
Different view of the Valley National Bank.

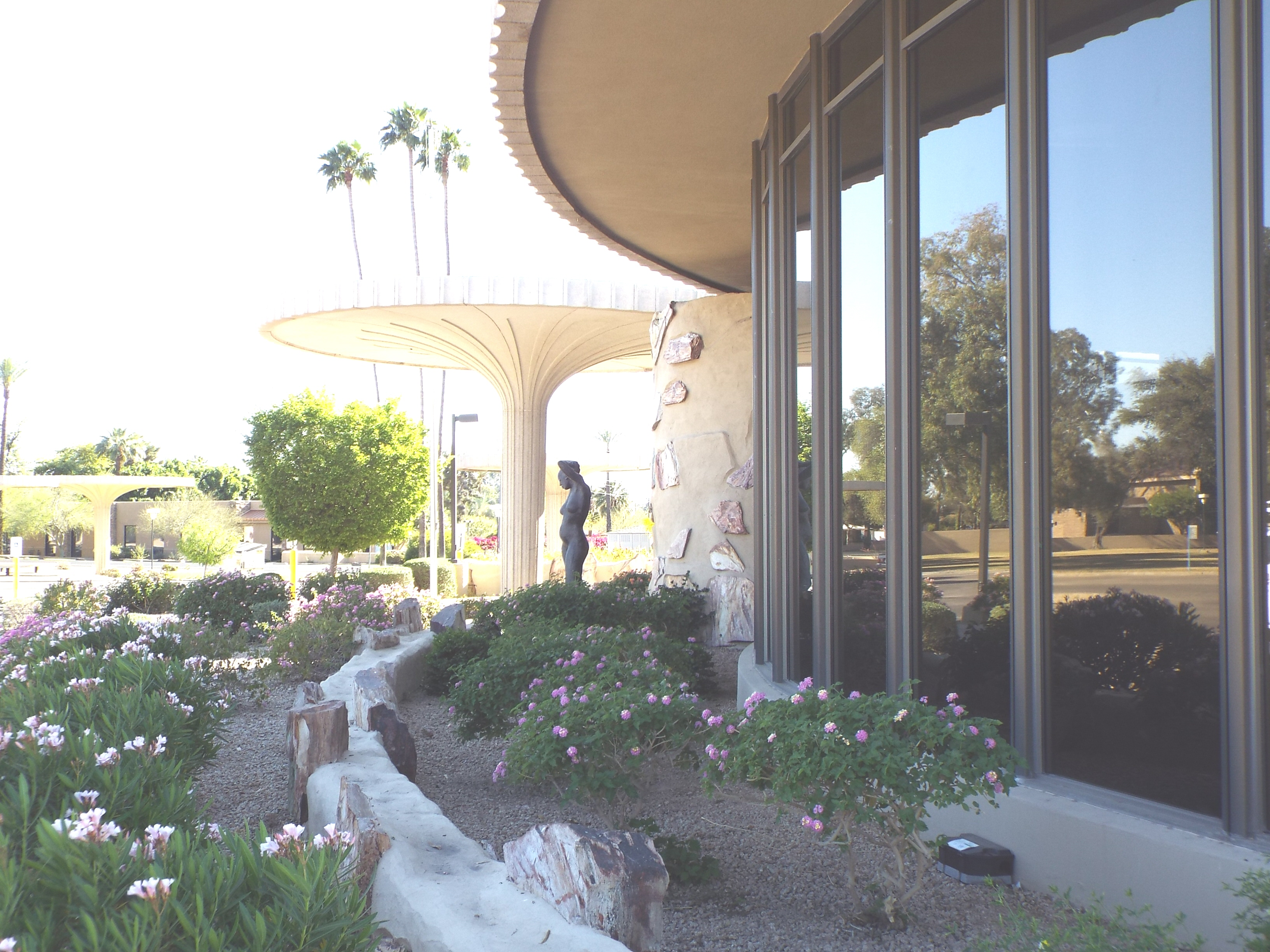
Side view of the Valley National Bank.

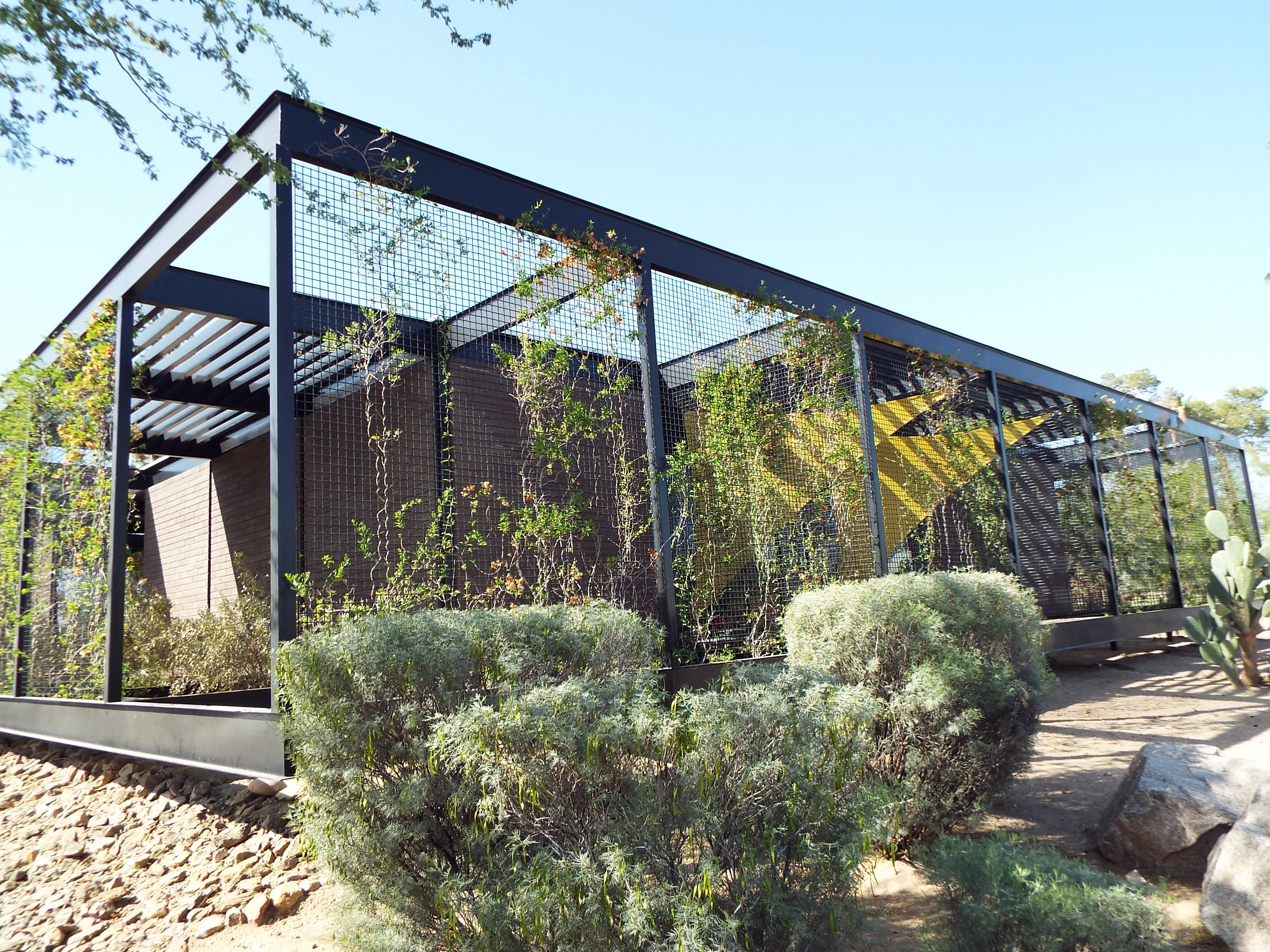
The Vlassis Ruzow and Associates Building was built in 1974. It is located at 1545 W. Thomas Road. The structure is listed in the National Register of Historic Places on April 12, 2007, reference #07000279, as part of the Margarita Historic District.

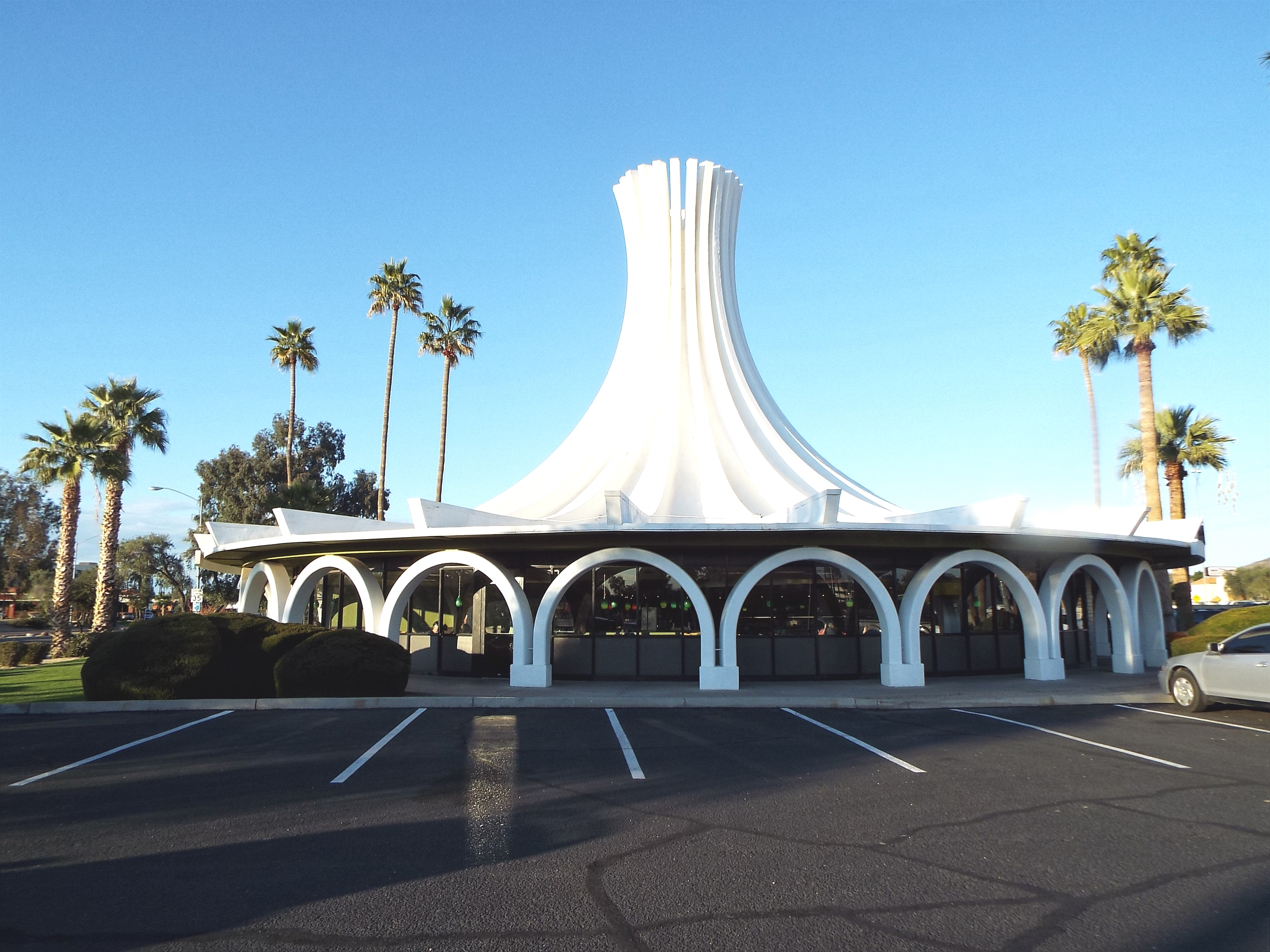
Western Savings & Loan Building. The vase-like shaped building was built in 1975 and is located at 10005 South Metro Parkway. It is listed as historic by the Phoenix Historic Property Register.

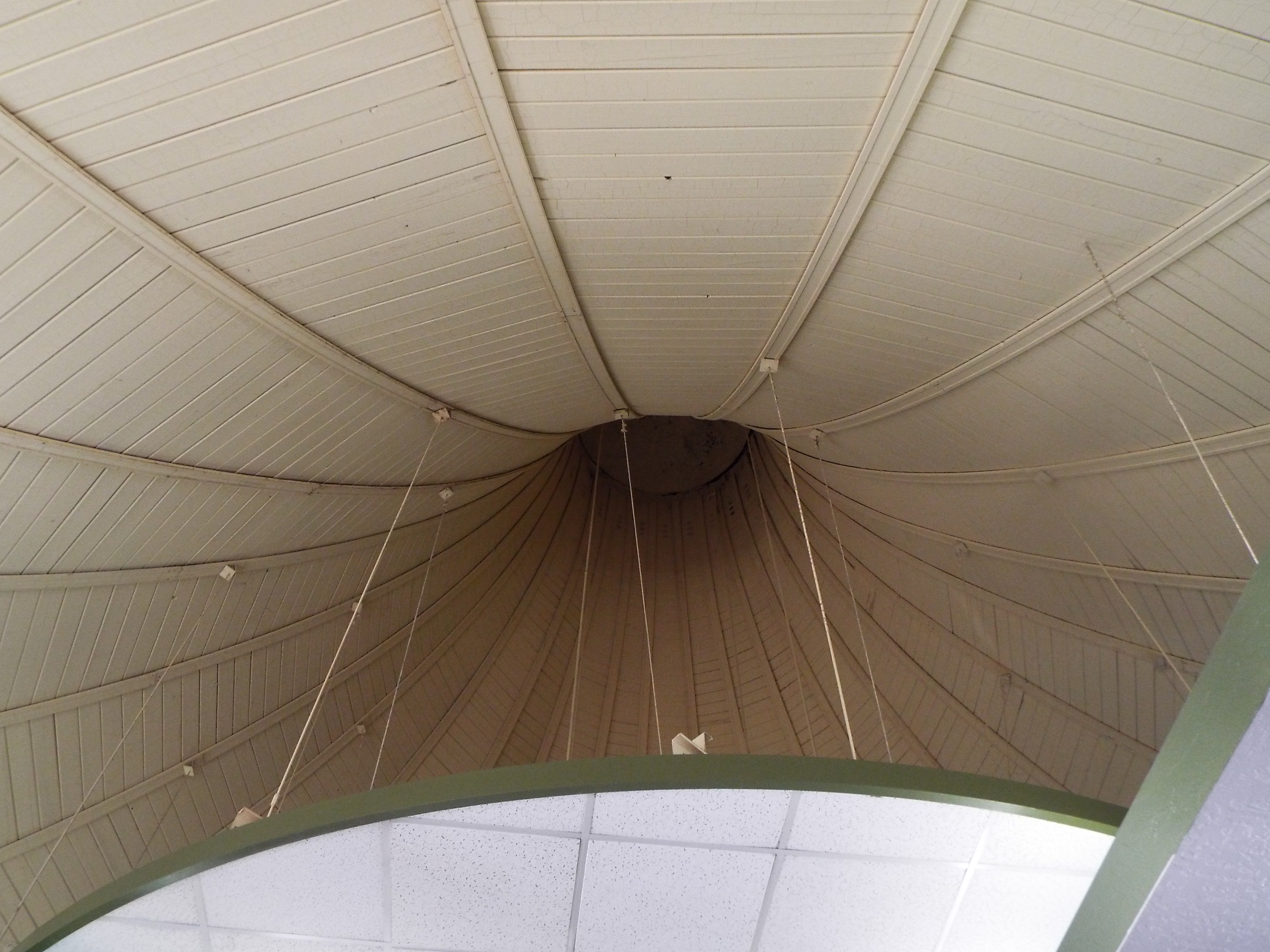
Inside view of the curved roof of the Western Savings & Loan Building.

=== Houses of religious worship ===
Many of the historic houses of religious worship, such as the "First Presbyterian Church" (1892), are listed in the National Register of Historic Places. Others, such as the "Tanner Chapel A.M.E. Church" (1929), have been designated historic by the Phoenix Historic Property Register. The Tanner Chapel A.M.E. Church, one of the oldest African-American churches in the state, is the only Arizona church where civil rights leader Martin Luther King Jr. is known to have given a sermon. Houses of religious worship such as the "First Mexican Baptist Church" (1920), Phoenix's oldest Hispanic church, are recognized as historic by surveys, as in the case of the Hispanic American Historic Property Survey of the City of Phoenix.

Historic Houses of religious worship in Phoenix, Arizona
(NRHP = National Register of Historic Places)
(PHPR = Phoenix Historic Property Register)
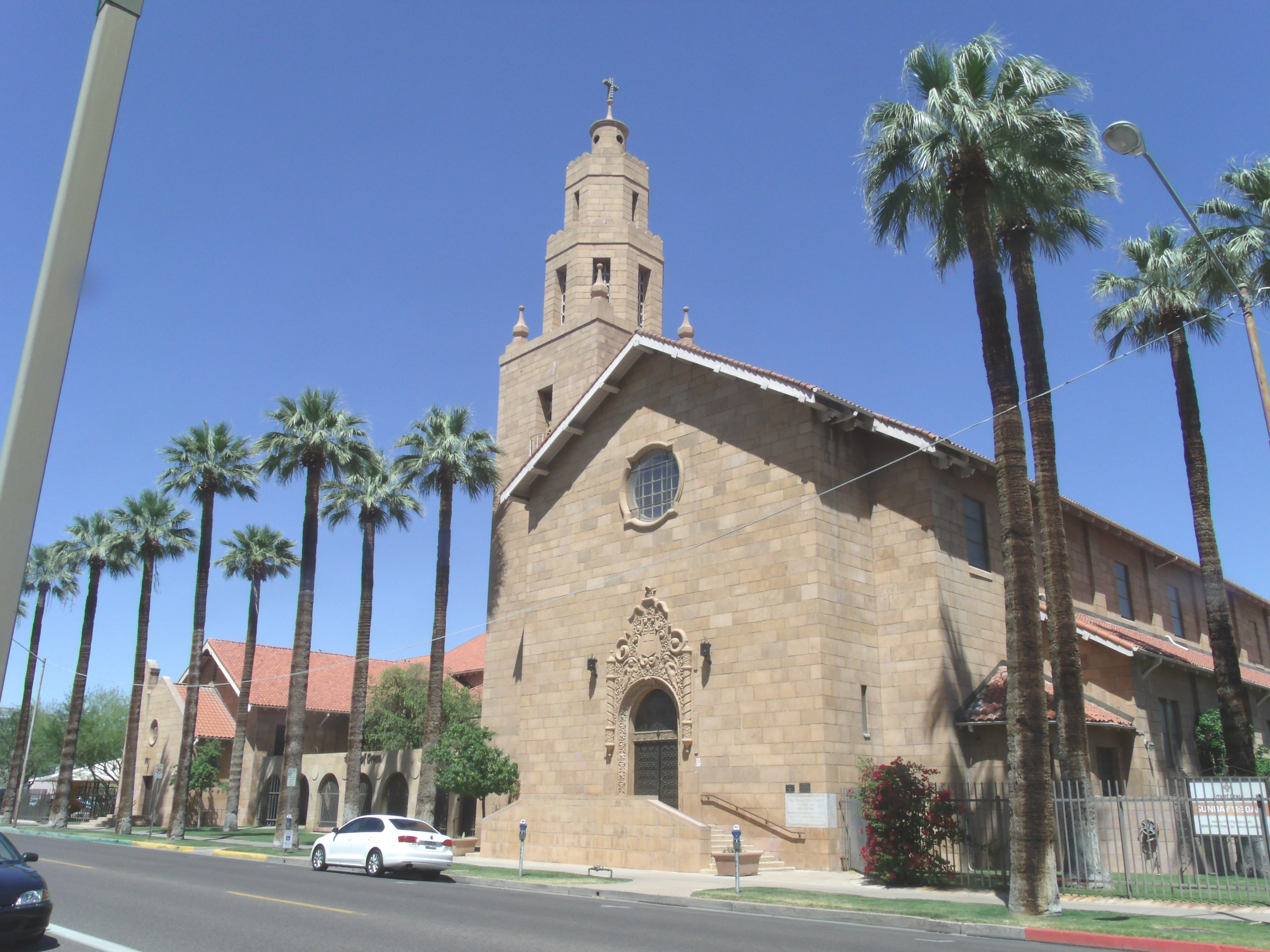
The First Presbyterian Church was built in 1892 and is located at 402 W. Monroe St. The property is listed in the National Register of Historic Places.

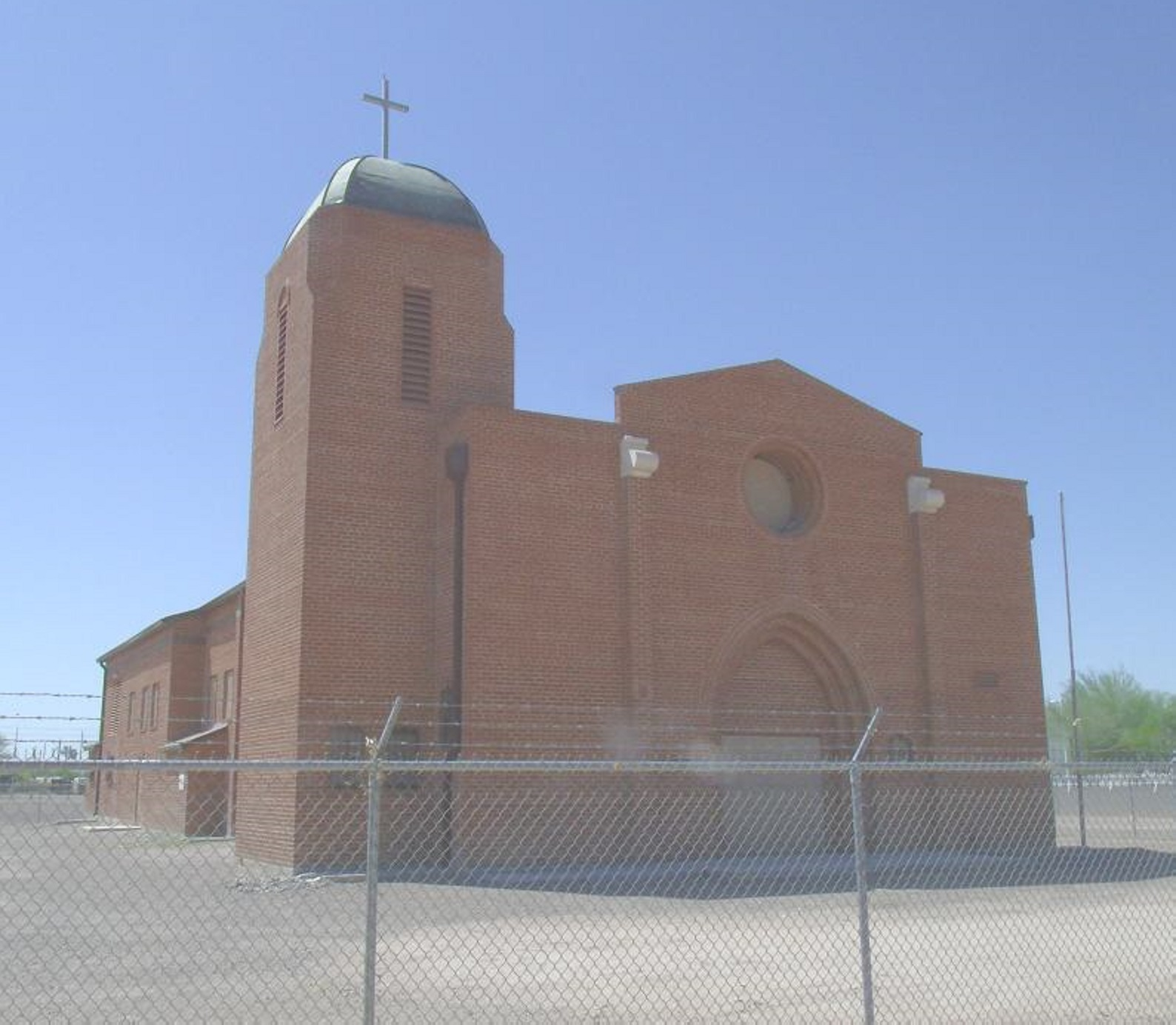
The Sacred Heart Church was built in 1900 and is located in 920 S. 17th Street. It was added to the National Register of Historic Places March 20, 2012. Reference number 12000124.

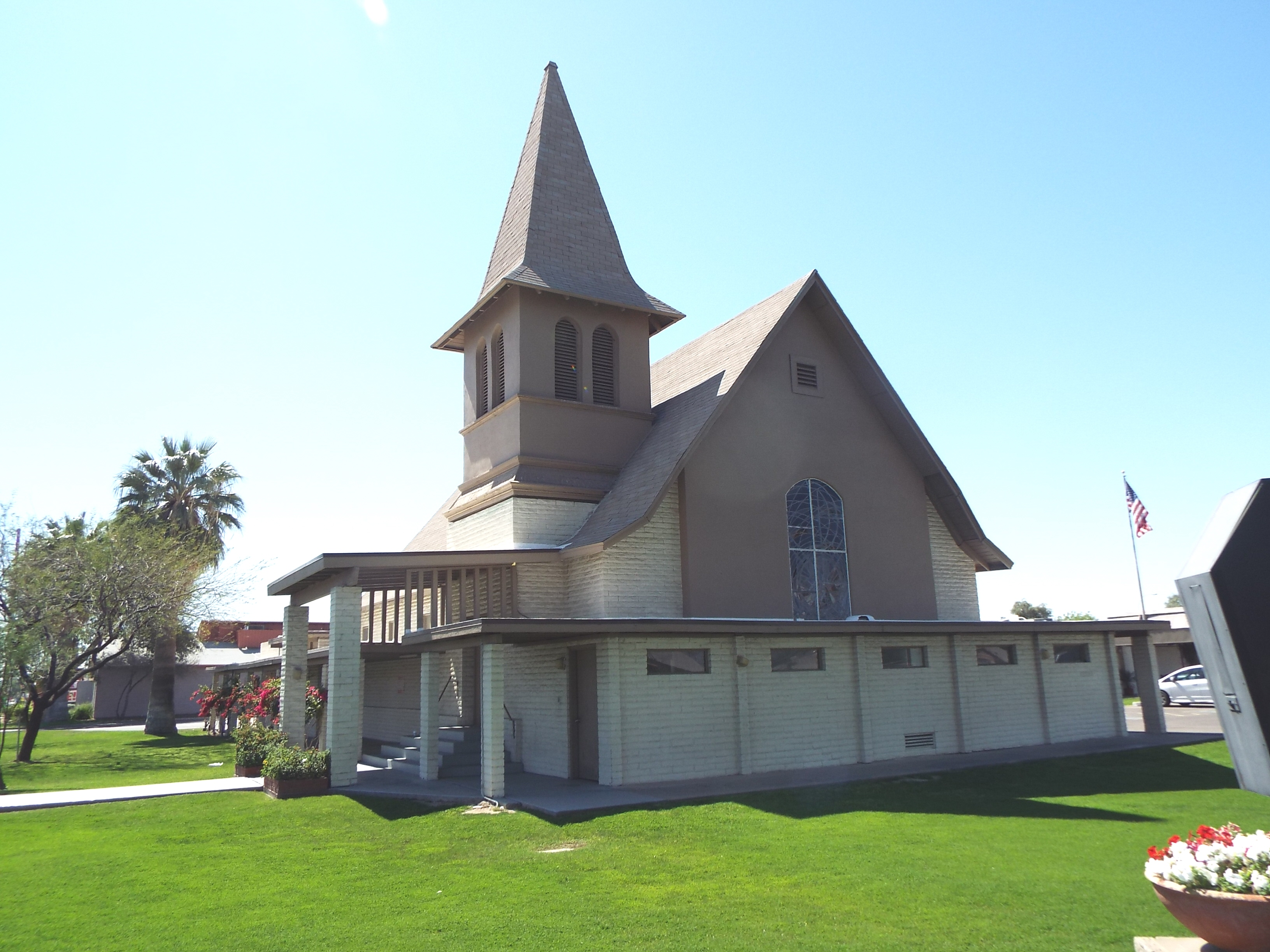
The Brooks Memorial United Methodist Church was built in 1908 and is located on 5921 West Thomas Road. Since 1985, the old church has been used as a funeral home.

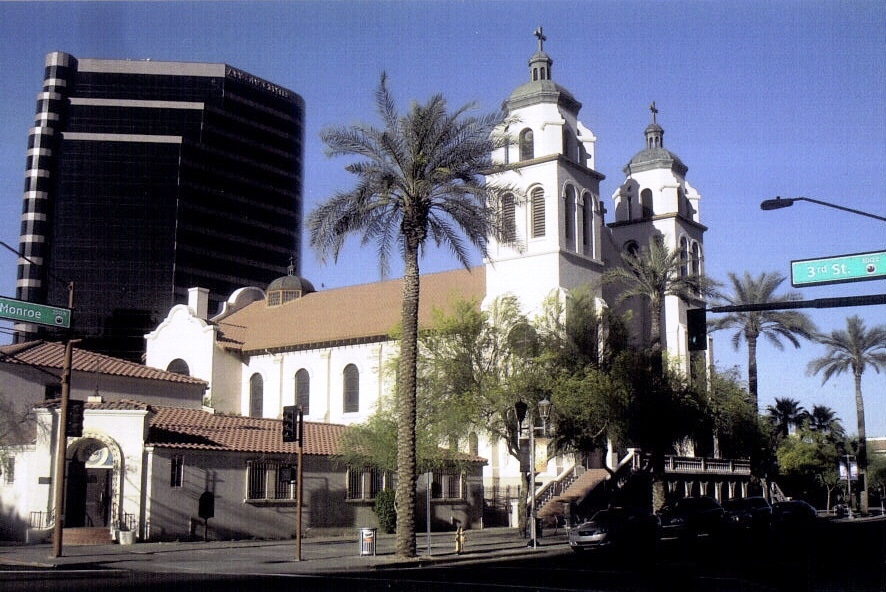
The Saint Mary's Basilica was built in 1914 and is located at 231 N. 3rd. Street. It was listed in the National Register of Historic Places on November 29, 1978, ref. #78000551.

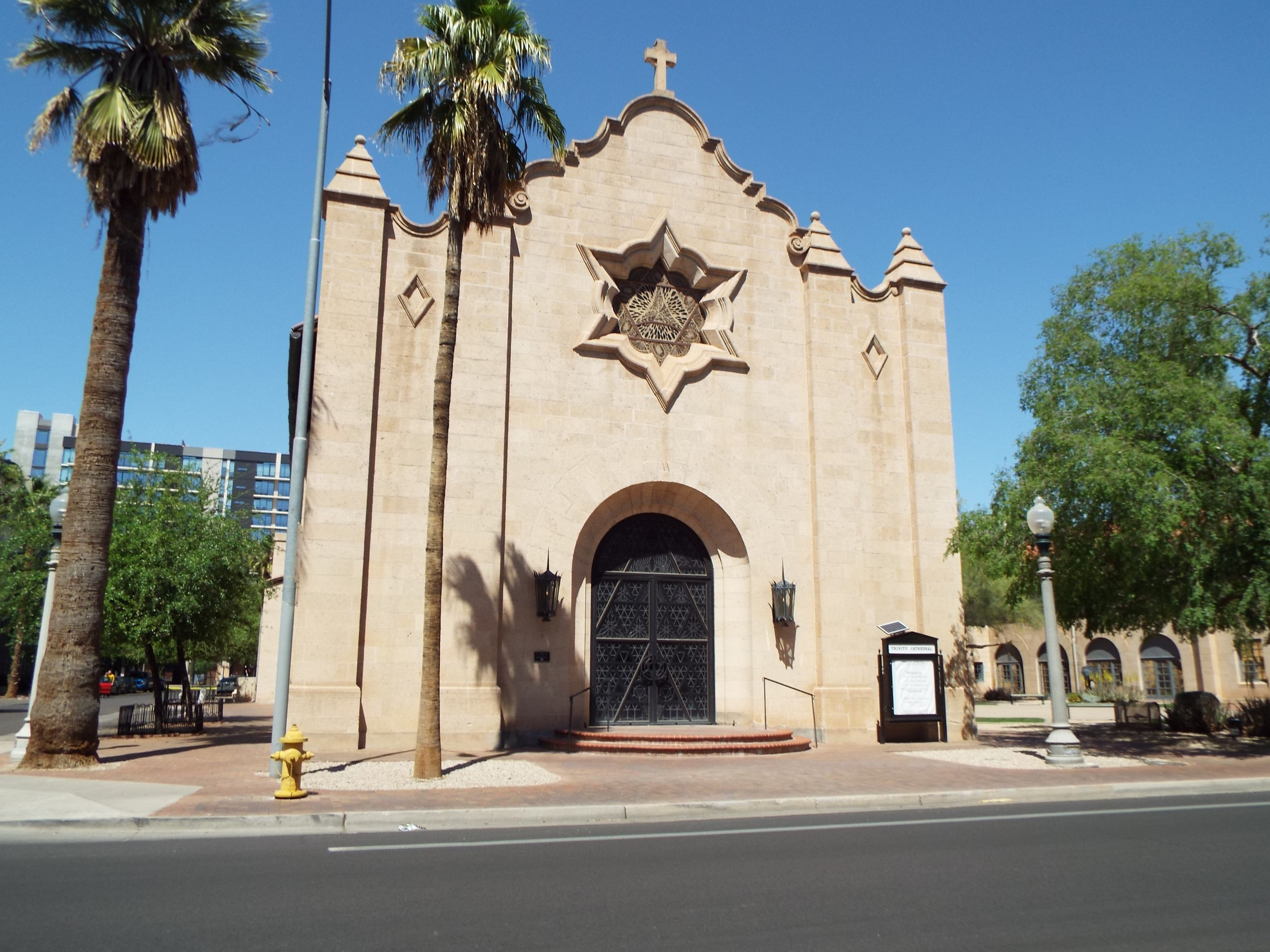
The Trinity Episcopal Cathedral was built in 1915 and is located at 100 W Roosevelt Street. It is listed in the Phoenix Historic Property Register.

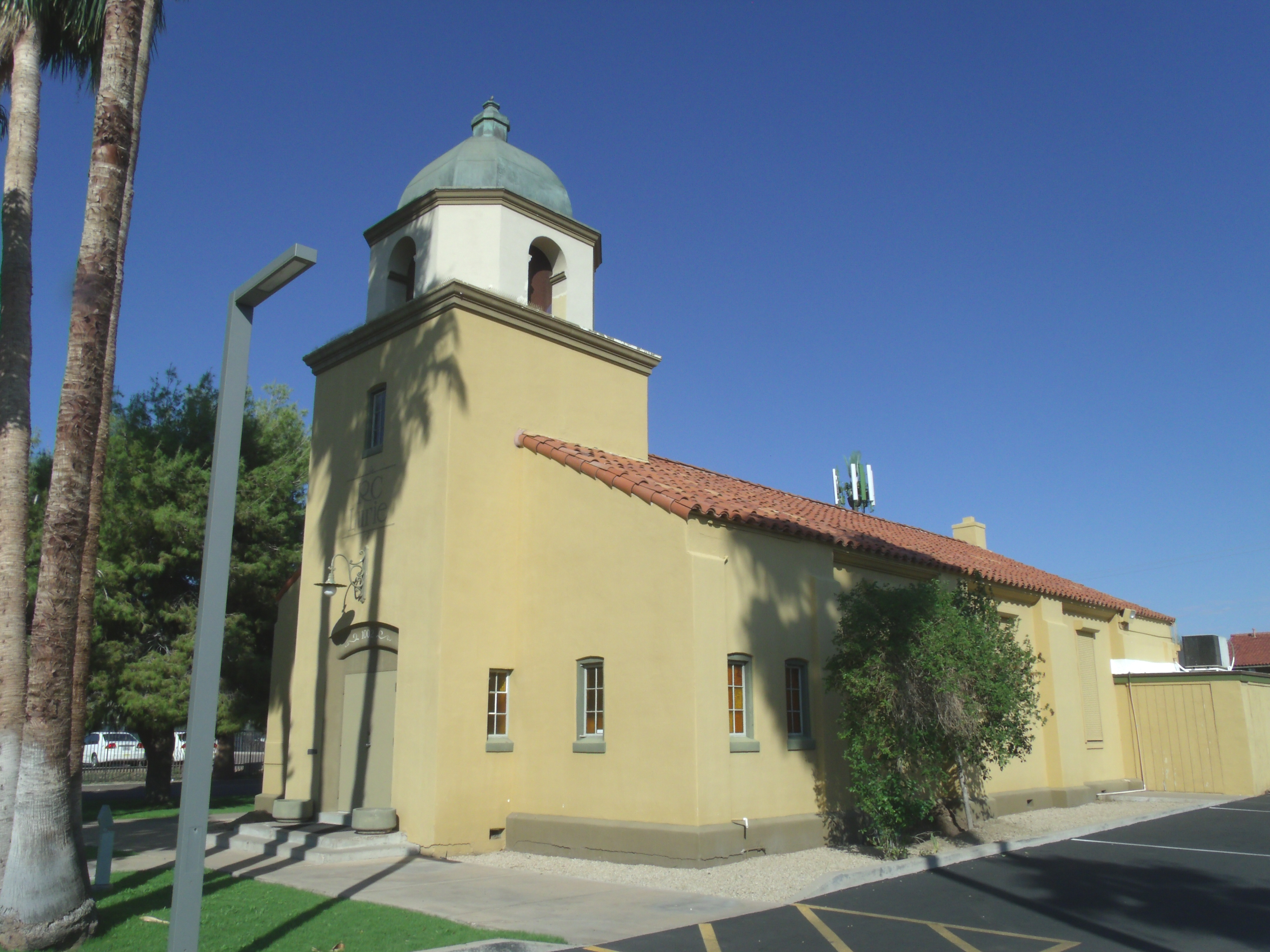
The First Mexican Baptist Church was built in 1920 and is located at 1002 E. Jefferson Avenue. It is Phoenix's oldest Hispanic church. This property is recognized as historic by the Hispanic American Historic Property Survey of the City of Phoenix.

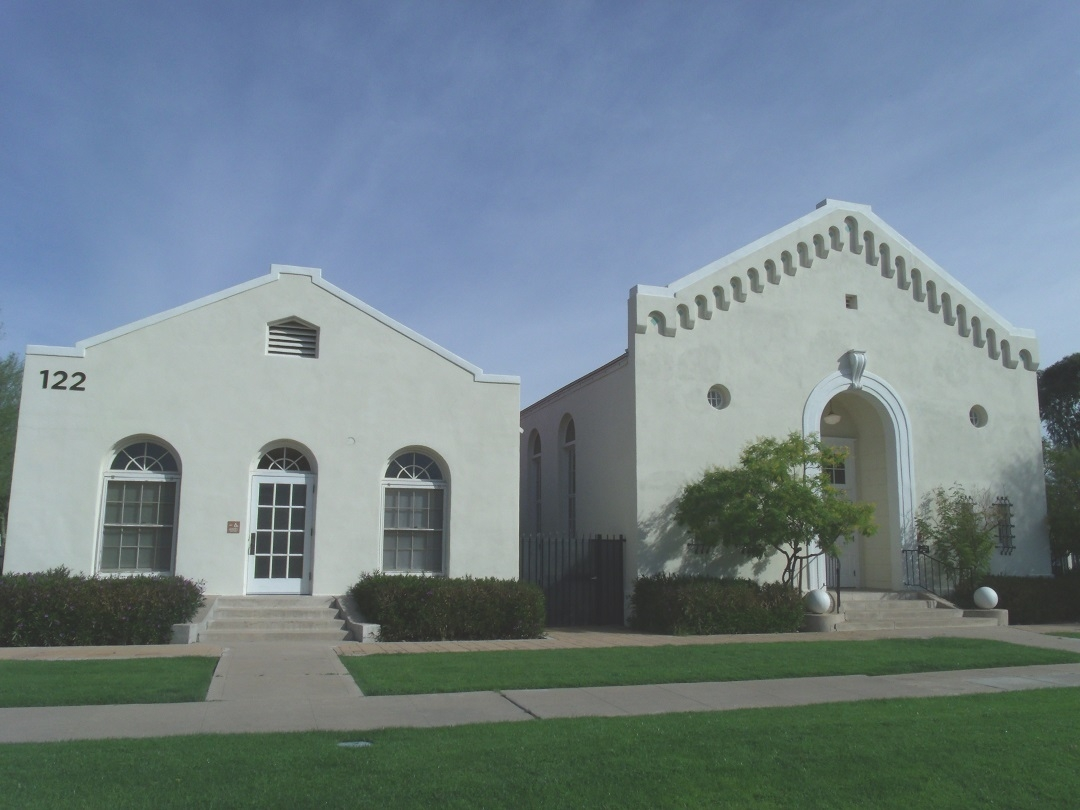
The Temple Beth Israel (1922)/ First Chinese Baptist Church (1957)/ Iglesia Bautista Central (1981) was built in 1922 and is located at 122 E. Culver Street. It was Phoenix's first synagogue and the building later served as Phoenix's First Chinese Baptist Church and from 1981 to 2002, the Hispanic community as the Iglesia Bautista Central. It was listed in the National Register of Historic Places on February 22, 2011, reference #11000043.

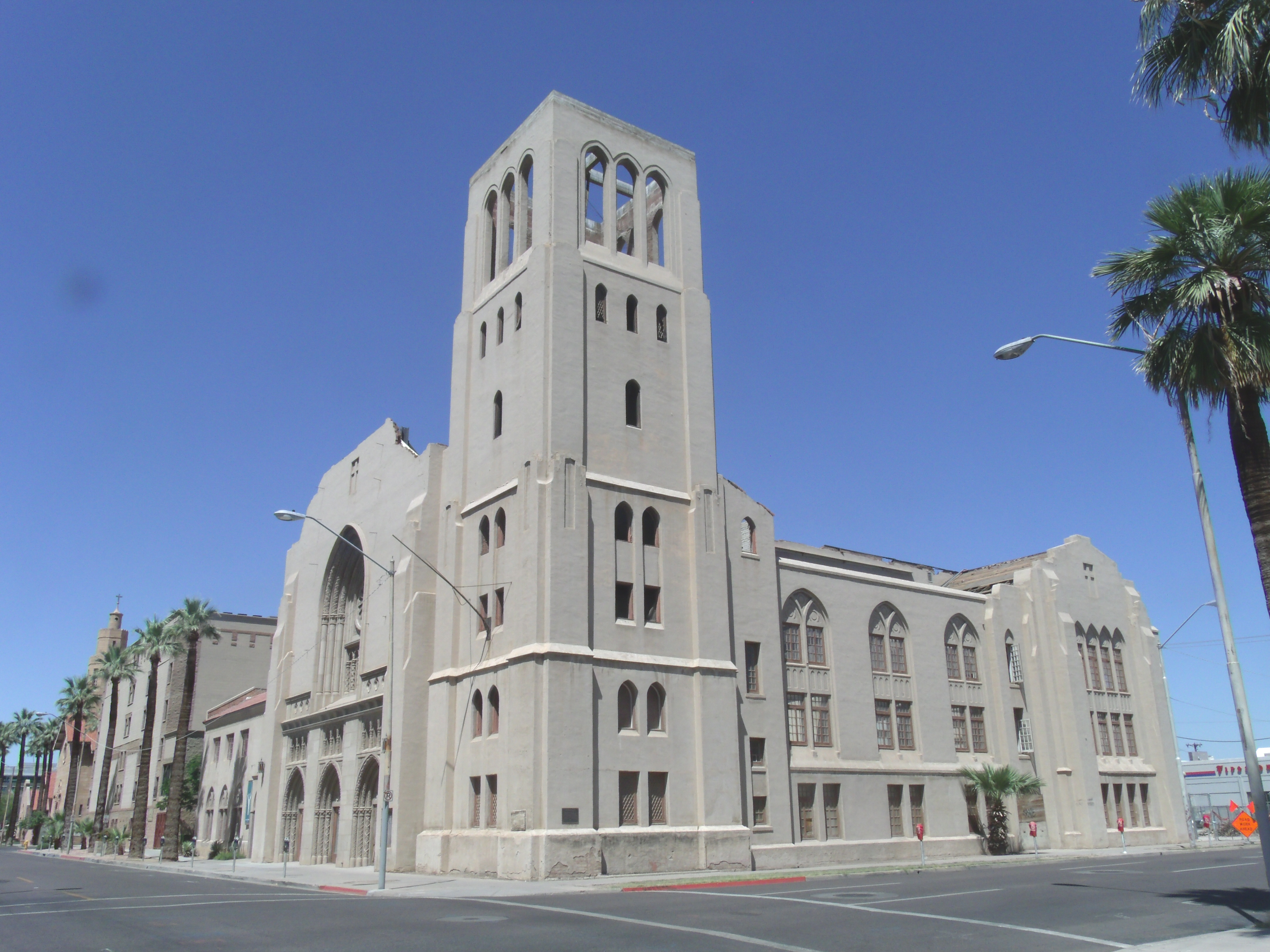
The First Baptist Church was built in 1923 and is located at 302 W. Monroe Street. The First Baptist Church is an Italian Gothic design by Phoenix architectural firm Fitzhugh & Byron. It was badly damaged by fire in 1980 and has been abandoned since. the structure is listed in the National Register of Historic Places.

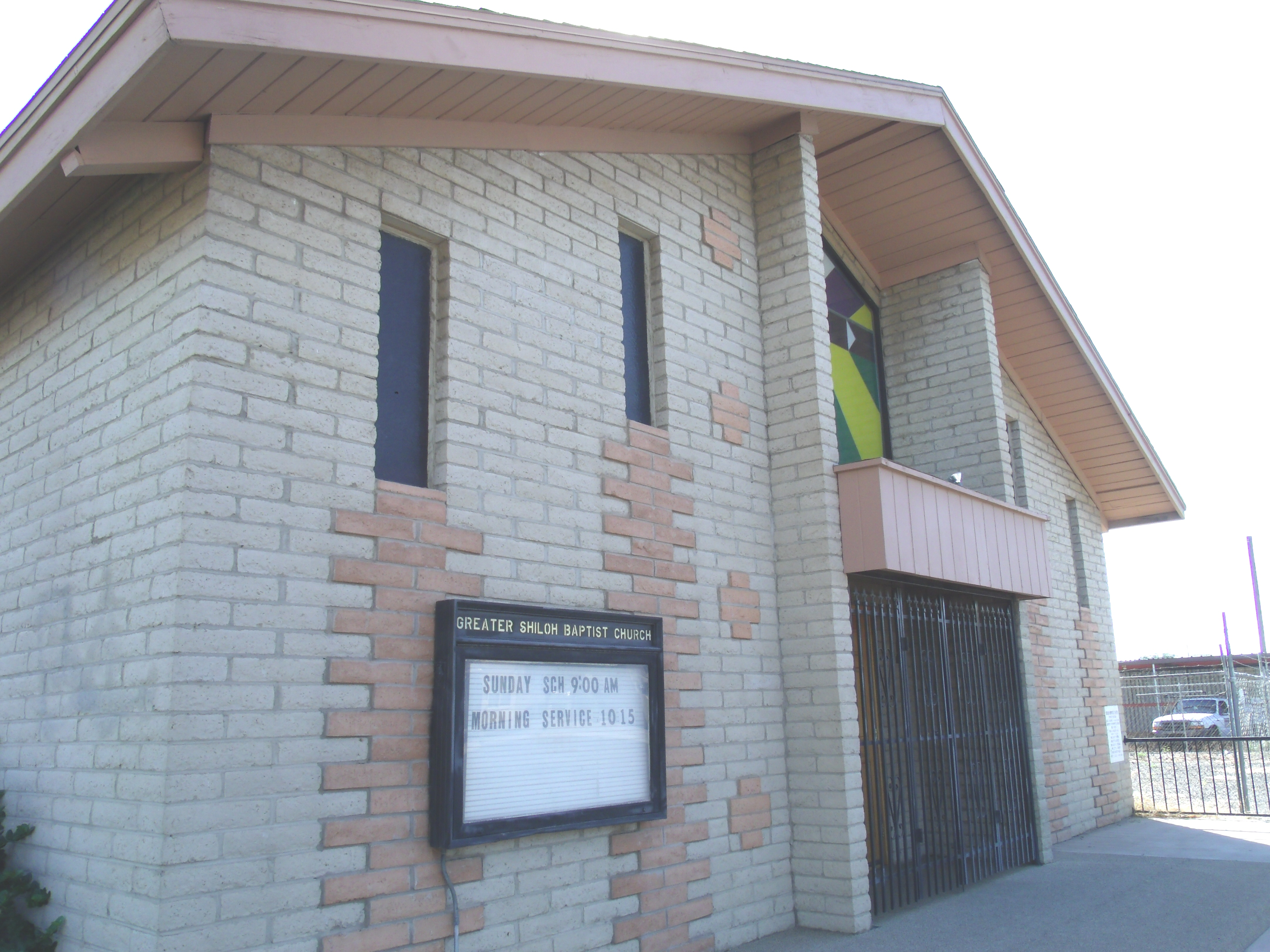
The Shiloh Baptist Church was built in 1924 and is located at 901 W. Buckeye Road. This is one of the earliest African-American churches in the West side of Phoenix. It is listed in the African American Historic Property Survey of the City of Phoenix.

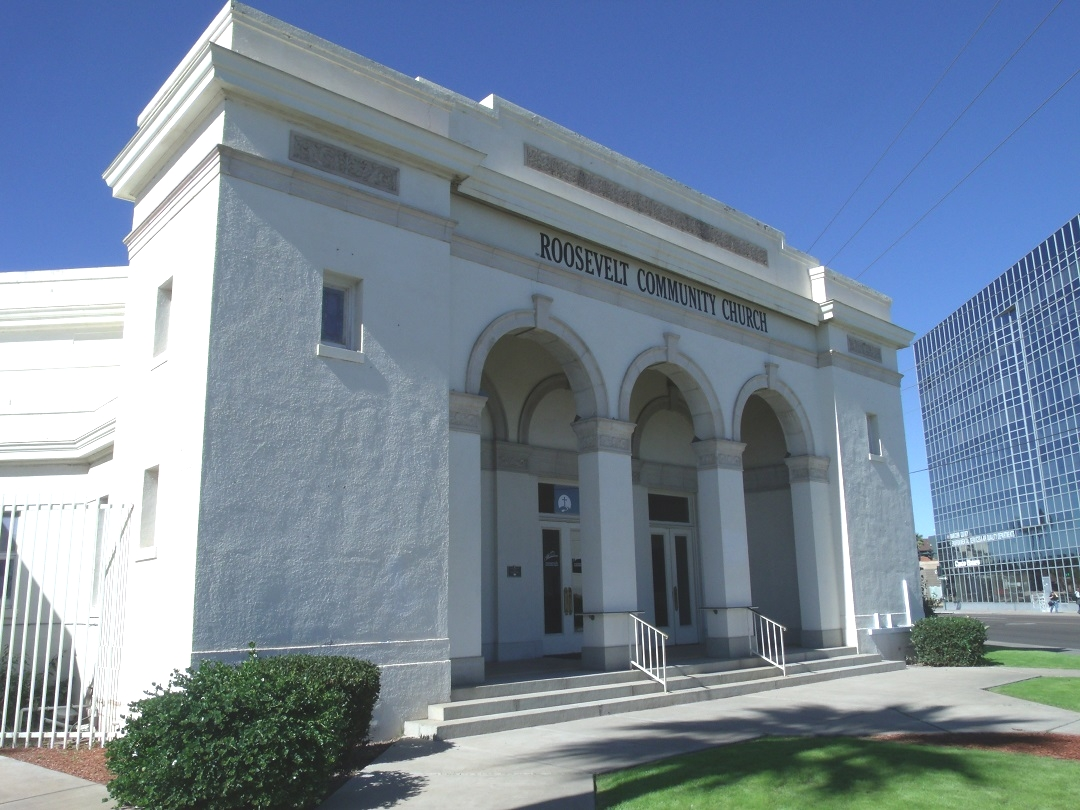
The Roosevelt Community Church was built in 1925 and was originally called the "First Church of Christ Scientist". It is located at 924 N. 1st Street and was listed in the National Register of Historic Places on August 10, 1993, reference #93000745.

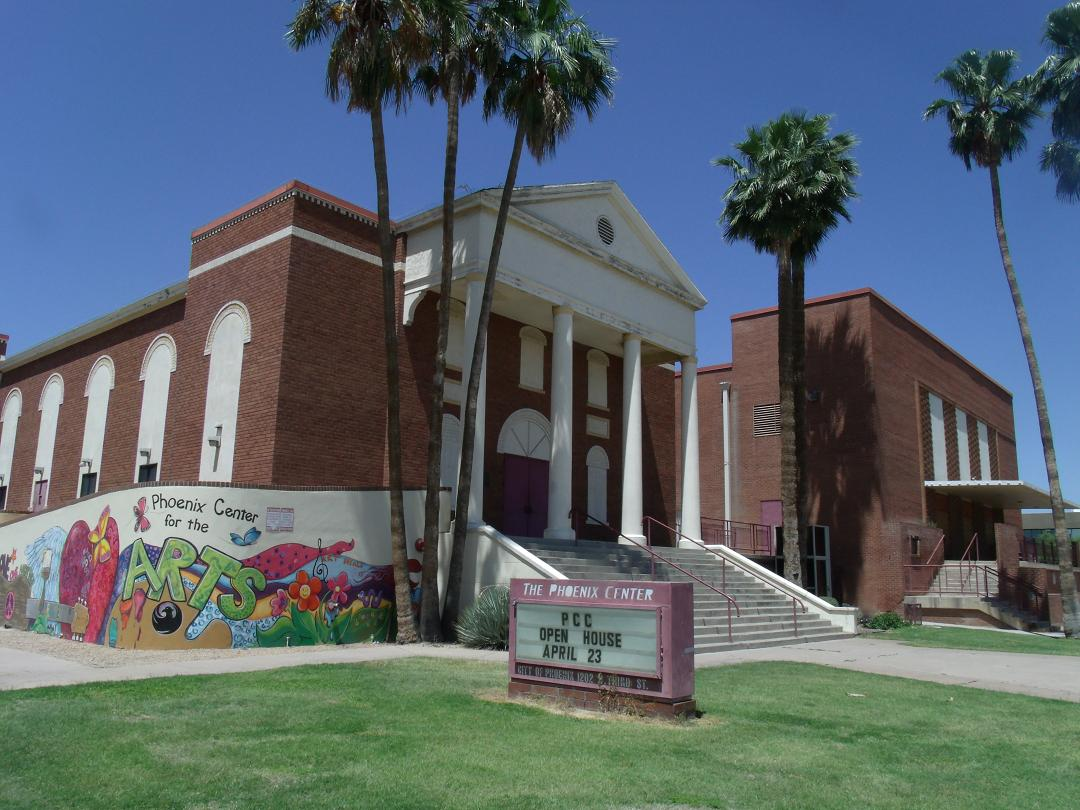
The Phoenix LDS Second Ward Church was built in 1929, and is the oldest LDS chapel in Phoenix. It was used by the "Phoenix Arts Council" for several years before being sold to the "Great Arizona Puppet Theater" in 1996. The building is located at 302 W Latham Street. It was added to the "National Register of Historic Places" in 1983. Reference number 83003492.

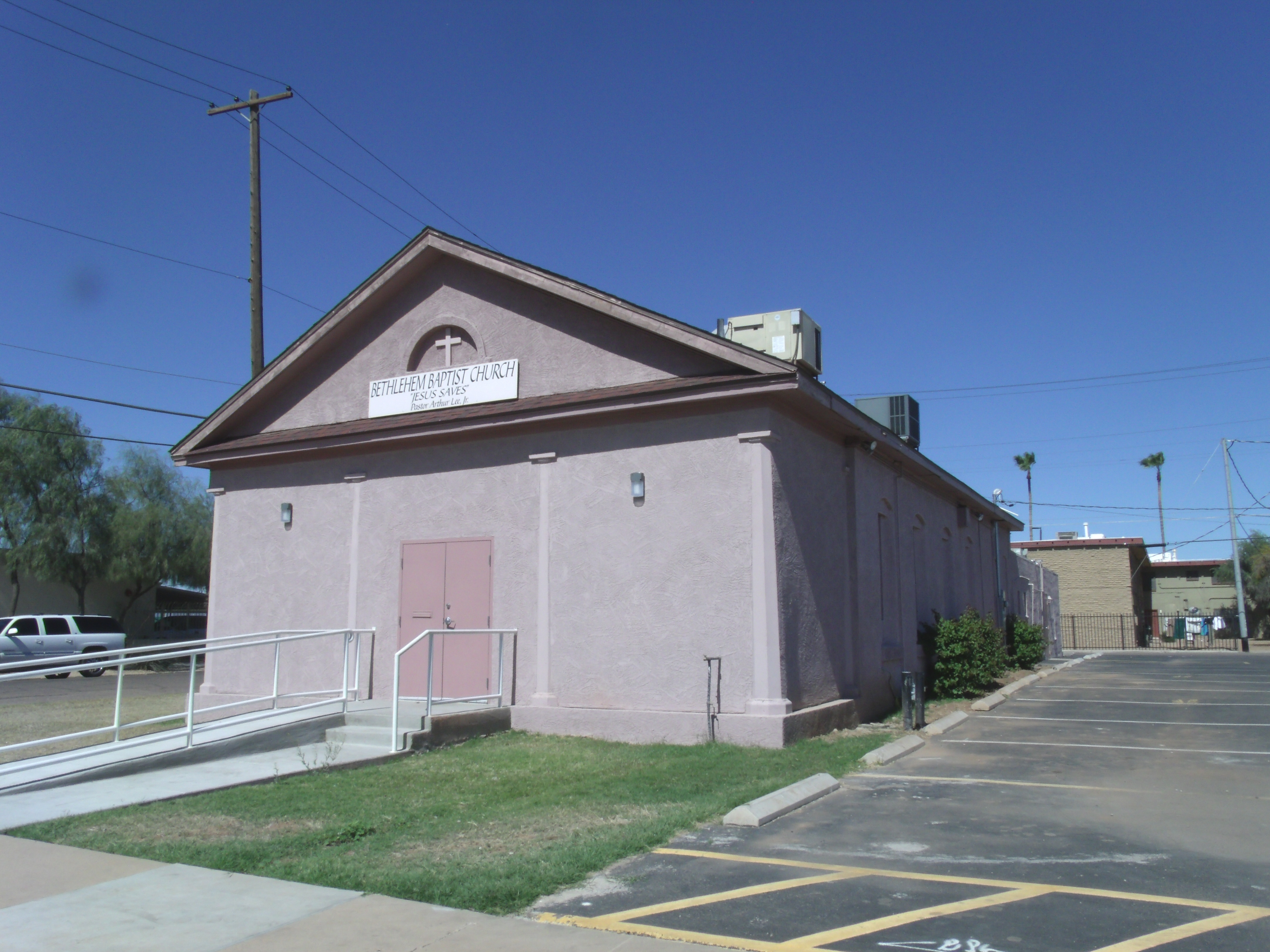
The Bethlehem Baptist Church was built in 1925 and is located at 1402 E. Adams Street. It was listed in the National Register of Historic Places in 1993, ref.: #93000744.

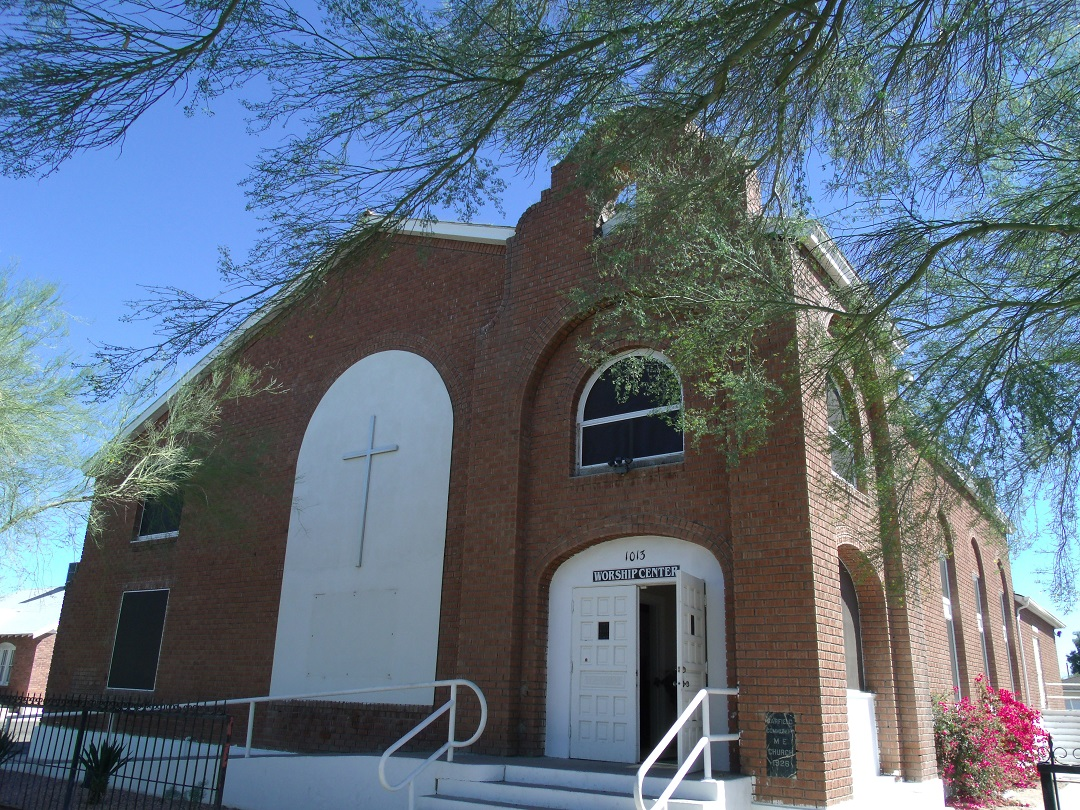
The Garfield Methodist Church was built in 1926 and is located at 1302 E. Roosevelt Street. It was listed in the National Register of Historic Places on August 10, 1993, reference #93000743.

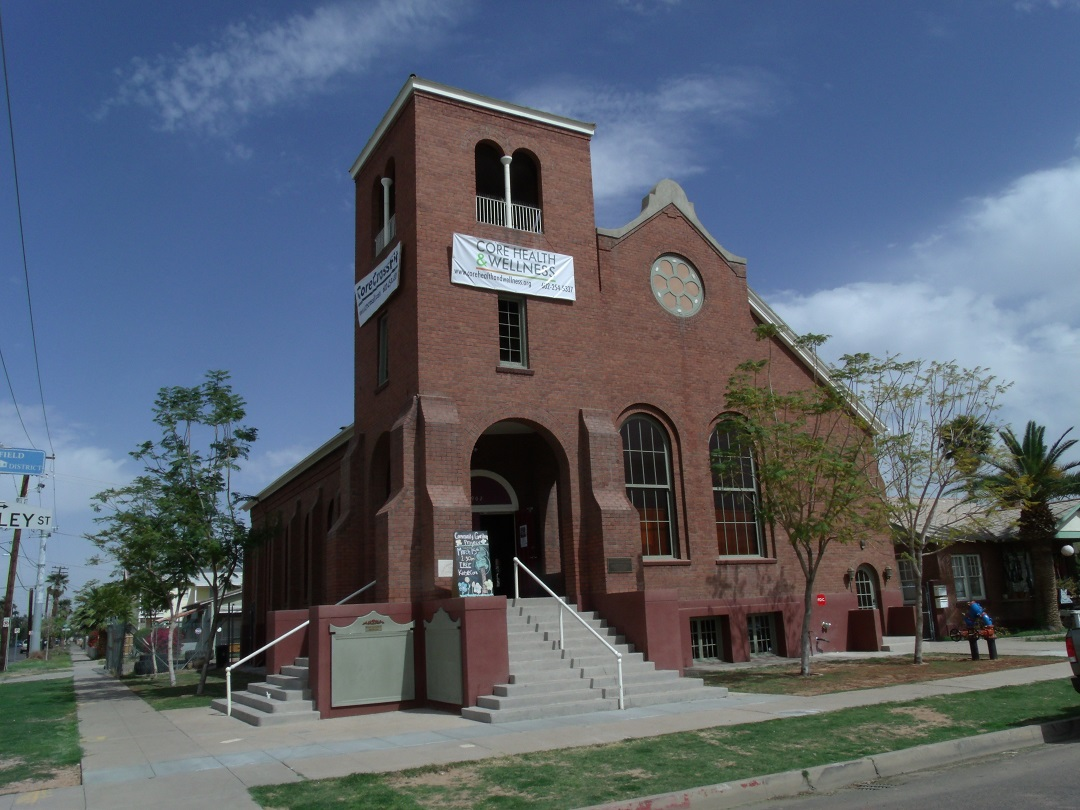
The First Missionary Church was built in 1928 and is located at 902 E. McKinley in Phoenix's historic Garfield neighborhood. The architecture of the structure is that of Mission Revival. It is designated as a landmark by the Historic Preservation-Landmark (HP-L) overlay zoning. It is listed in the Phoenix Historic Property Register.

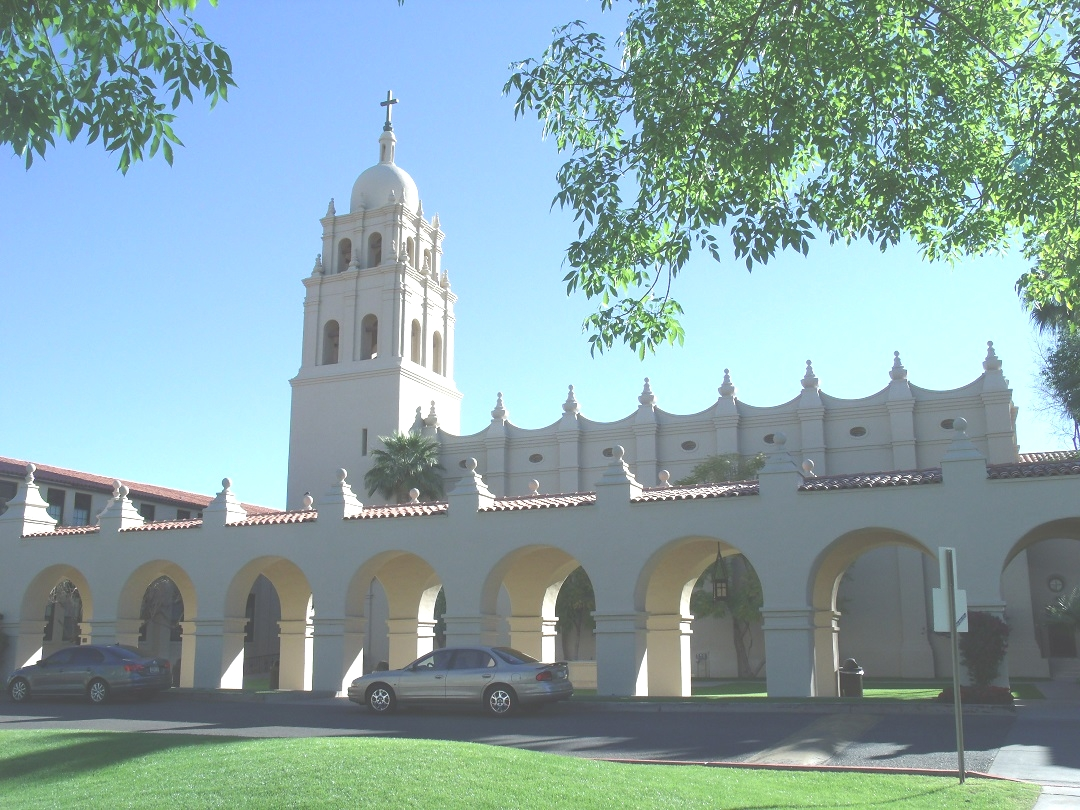
The Brophy College Chapel was built in 1928 and is located at 4701 N. Central Avenue. The Chapel was donated by Mrs. William Henry Brophy in memory of her husband. The Spanish Colonial chapel was built by the students of Brophy College. It was listed in the National Register of Historic Places on August 10, 1993, reference #93000747.

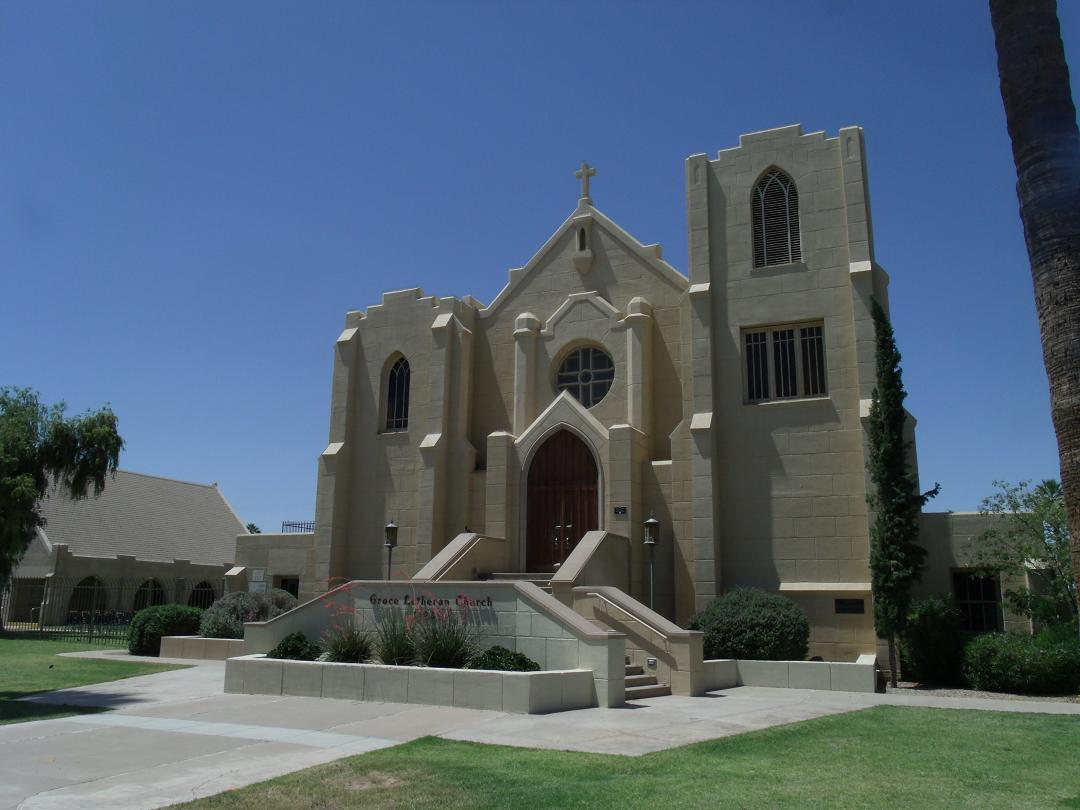
The Grace Lutheran Church was built in 1928 and is located at 1124 N. 3rd Street. It was added to the National Register of Historic Places in 1993, Reference number 93000835.

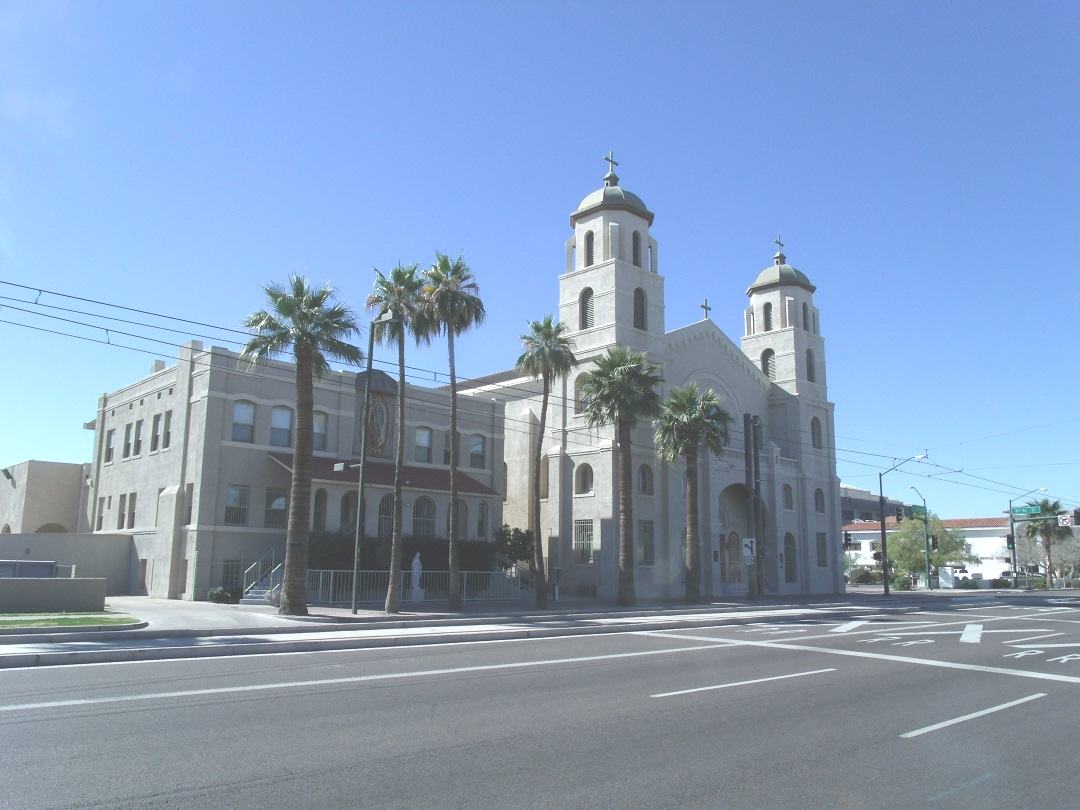
The Immaculate Heart of Mary Catholic Church was built in 1928 and is located at 909 E. Washington Street. It is Phoenix’ second oldest Hispanic church. The church was listed in the National Register of Historic Places on October 8, 1993, ref. number 93000742 (NRHP).

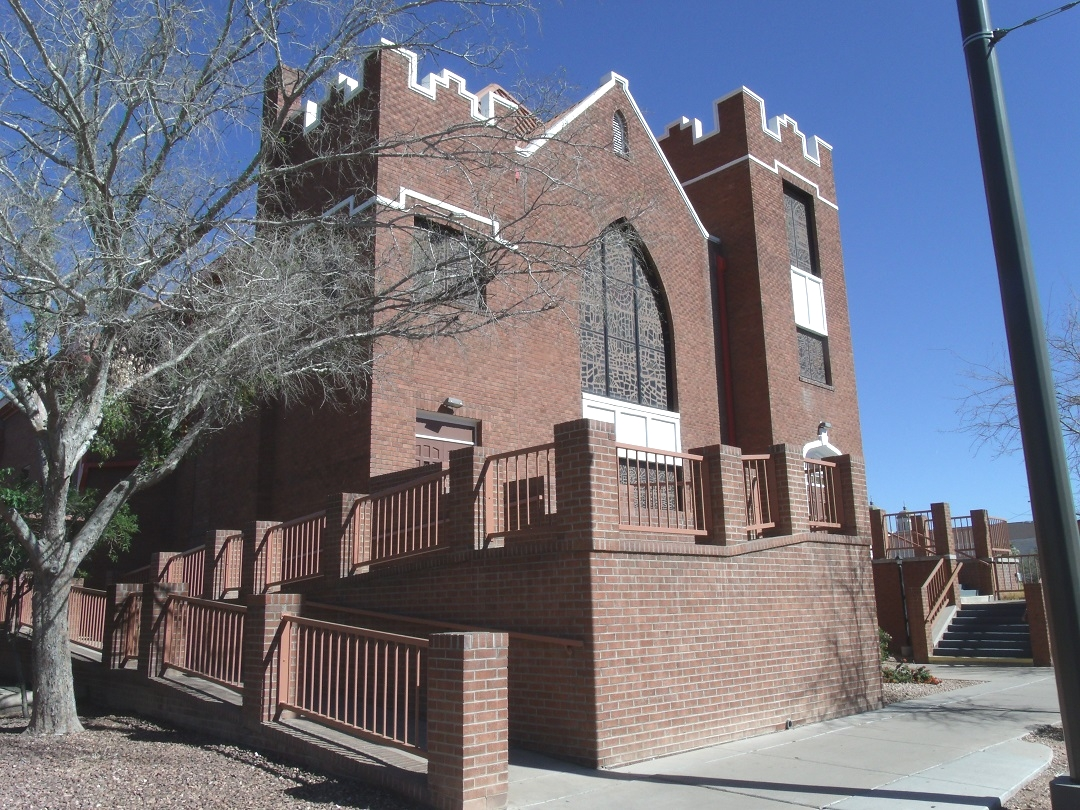
The Tanner Chapel A.M.E. Church, named after Bishop Benjamin T. Tanner, was built in 1929 and is located at 20 S. 8th Avenue. it is the oldest African-American congregation in Arizona. Designated as a landmark with Historic Preservation-Landmark (HP-L) overlay zoning. It is listed in the Phoenix Historic Property Register.

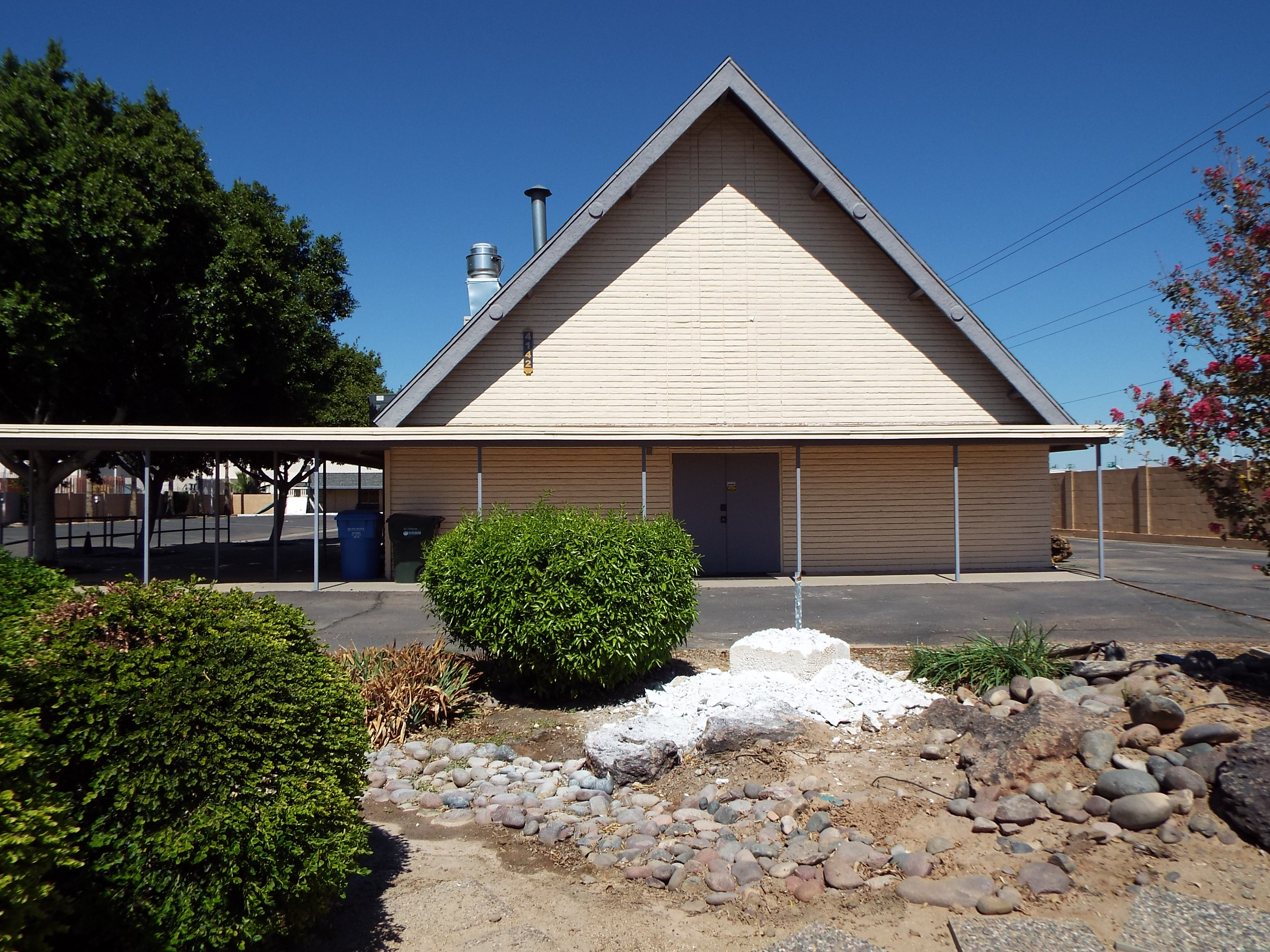
The Arizona Buddhist Temple built in 1930 and located at 4142 West Clarendon Avenue was the first church if its kind in Arizona.

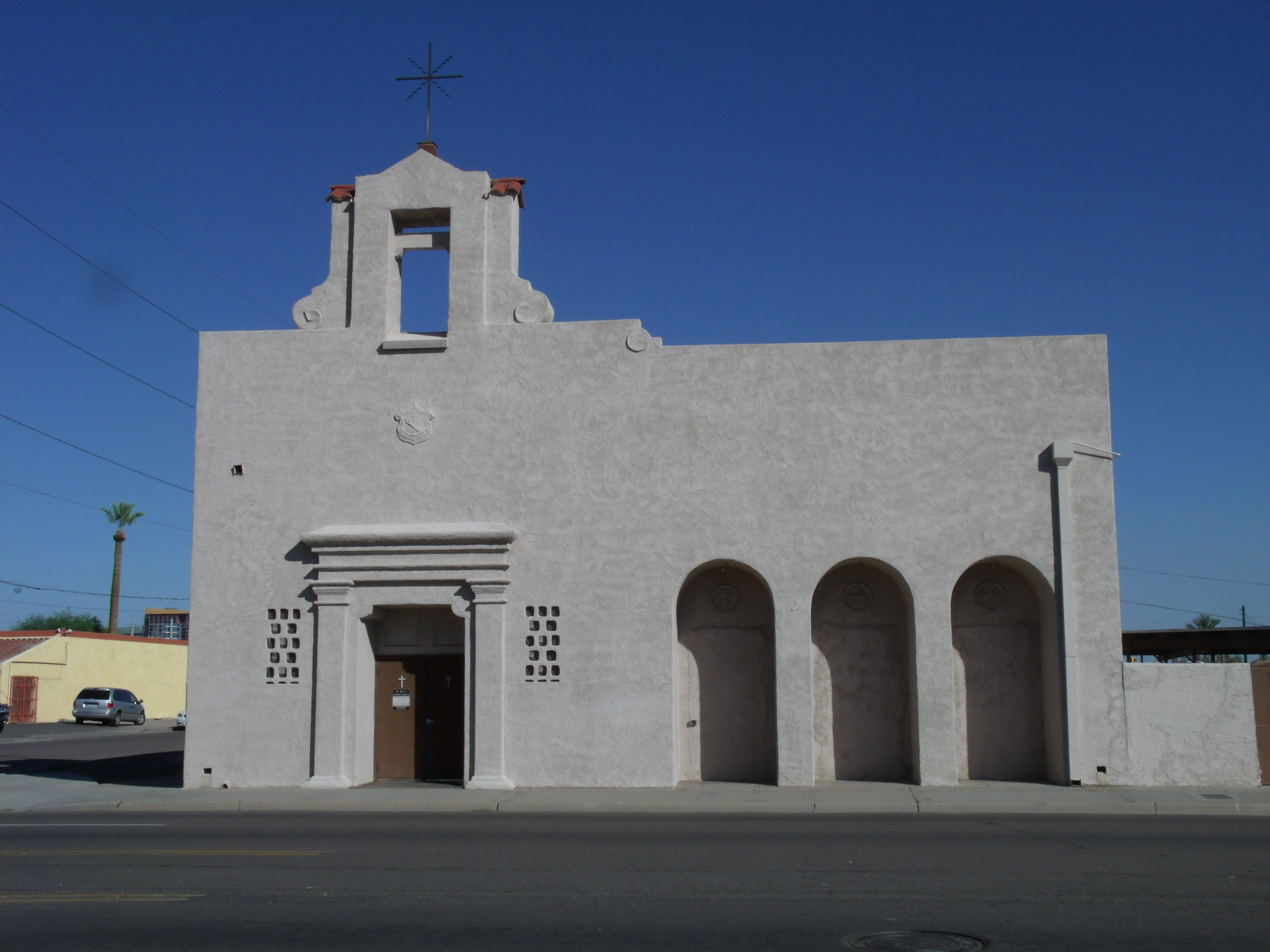
The St. Pius X Catholic Church was built in 1935 and is located at 802-815 South 7th Avenue. The church is listed in the Phoenix Historic Property Register.

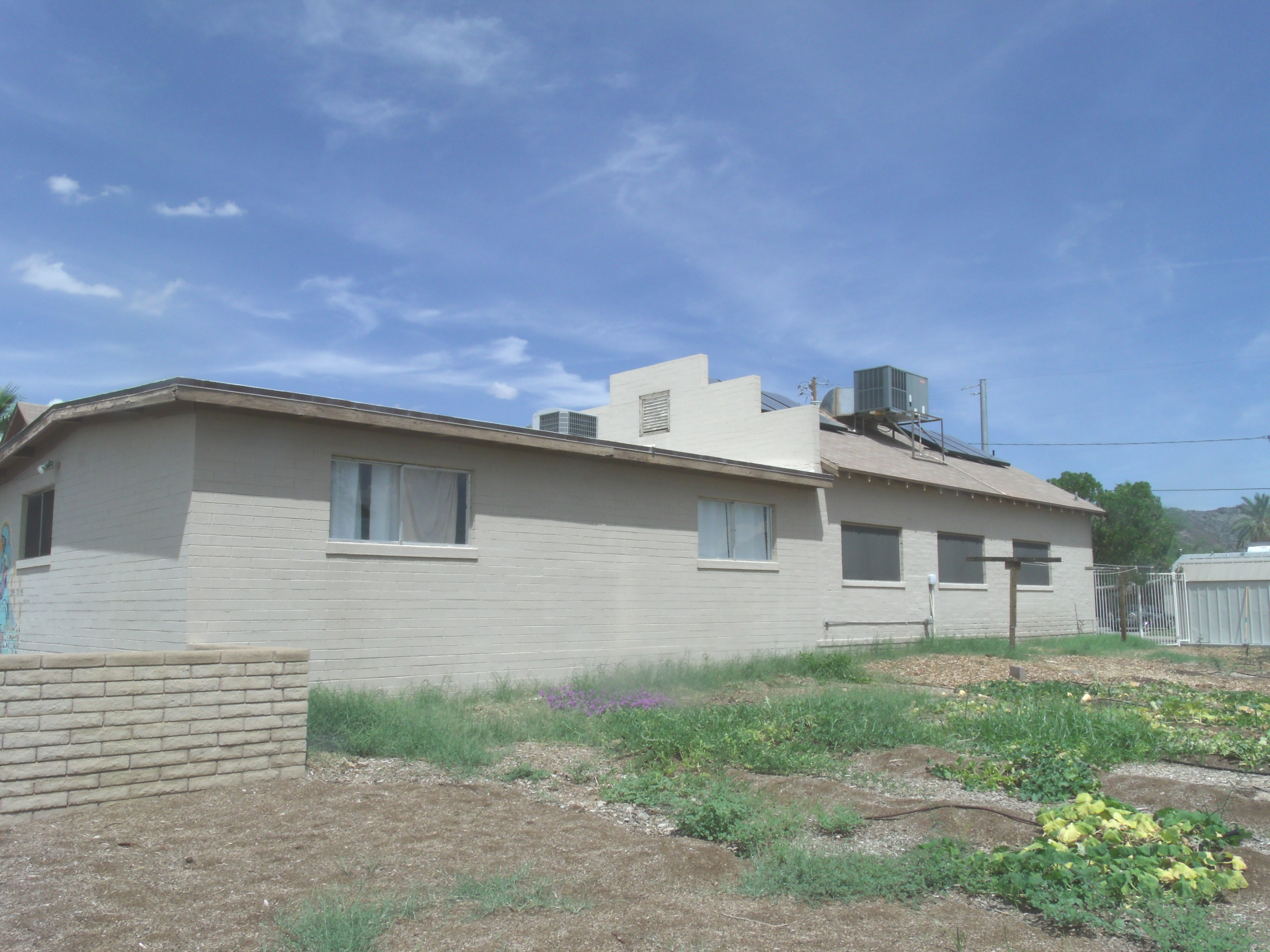
The Mennonite Church Meetinghouse was built in 1946 at 9835 N. 7th Street in what was then Sunnyslope. Sunnyslope later became part of Phoenix. In 1949, a new church was erected beside it. The older building was then used as a Christian day school and Sunday school. The church is listed in the Phoenix Historic Property Register.

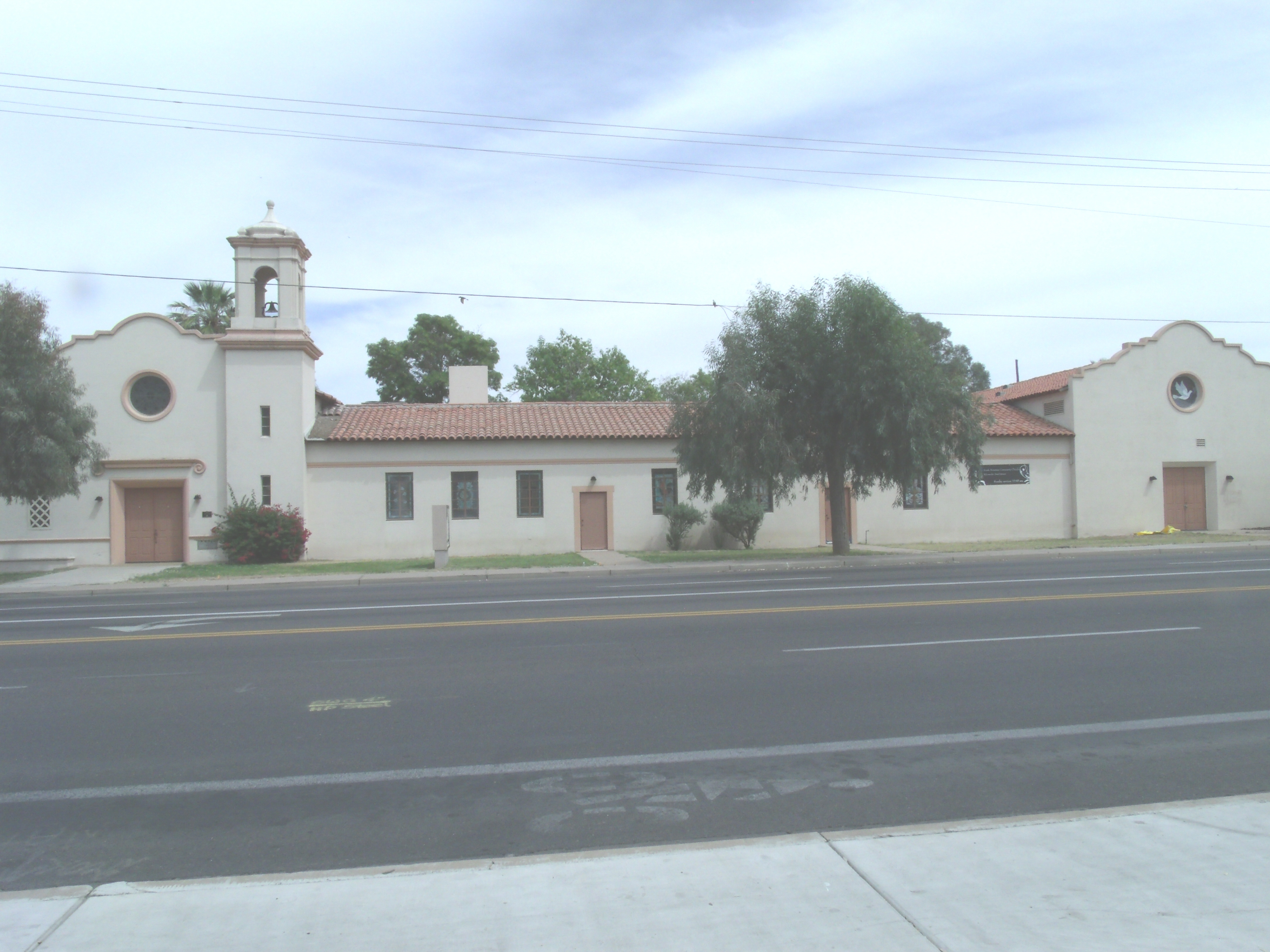
The South Mountain Community Church was built 1944 and is located 717 E Southern Avenue. It was listed in the Phoenix Historic Property Register in July 1993.

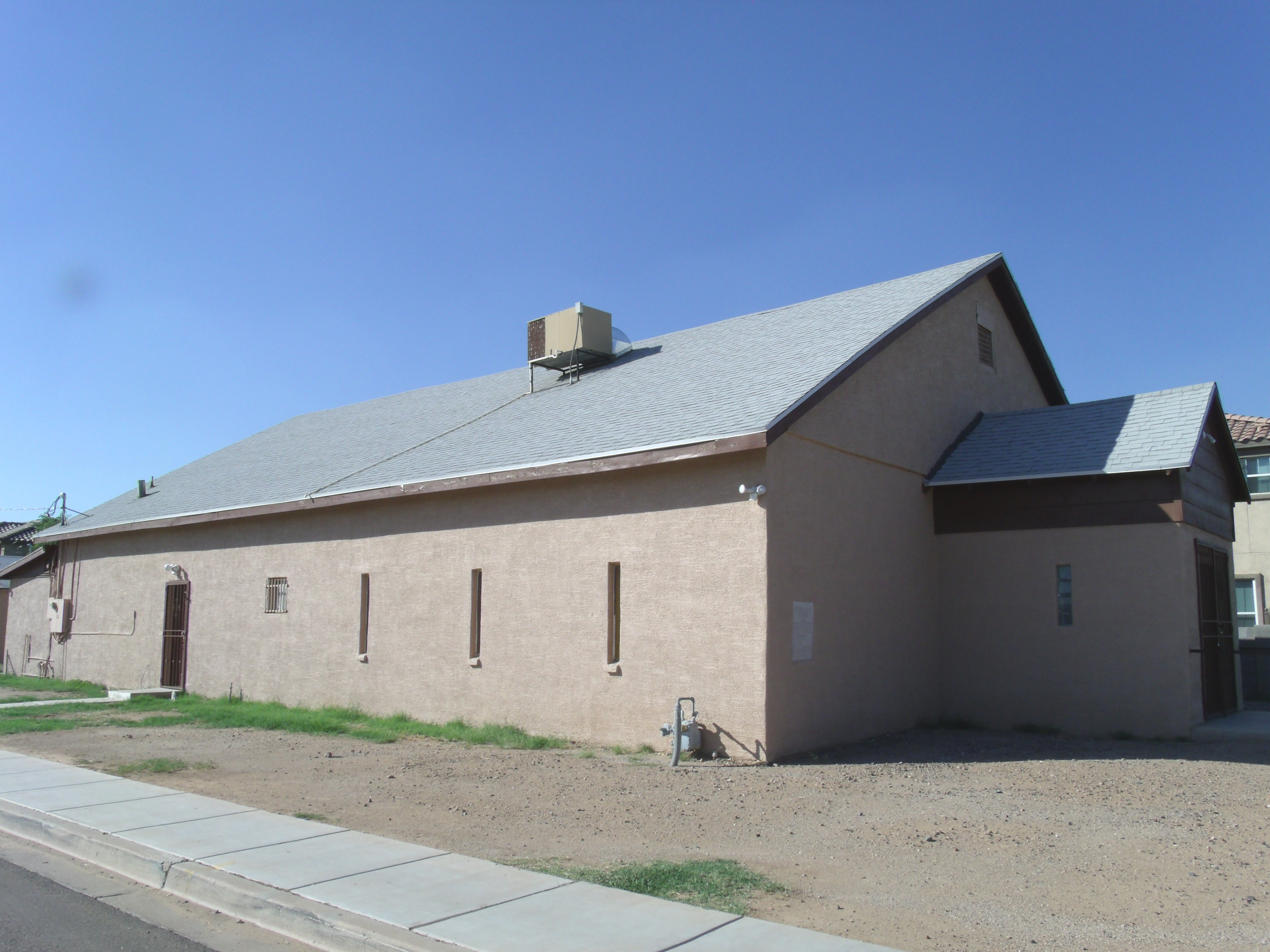
The Mount Calvary Baptist Church was built in 1944 and is located at 998 South 13th Avenue. It is one of the earliest churches to serve the Phoenix Afro-American community. It is listed in the African American Historic Property Survey of the City of Phoenix.

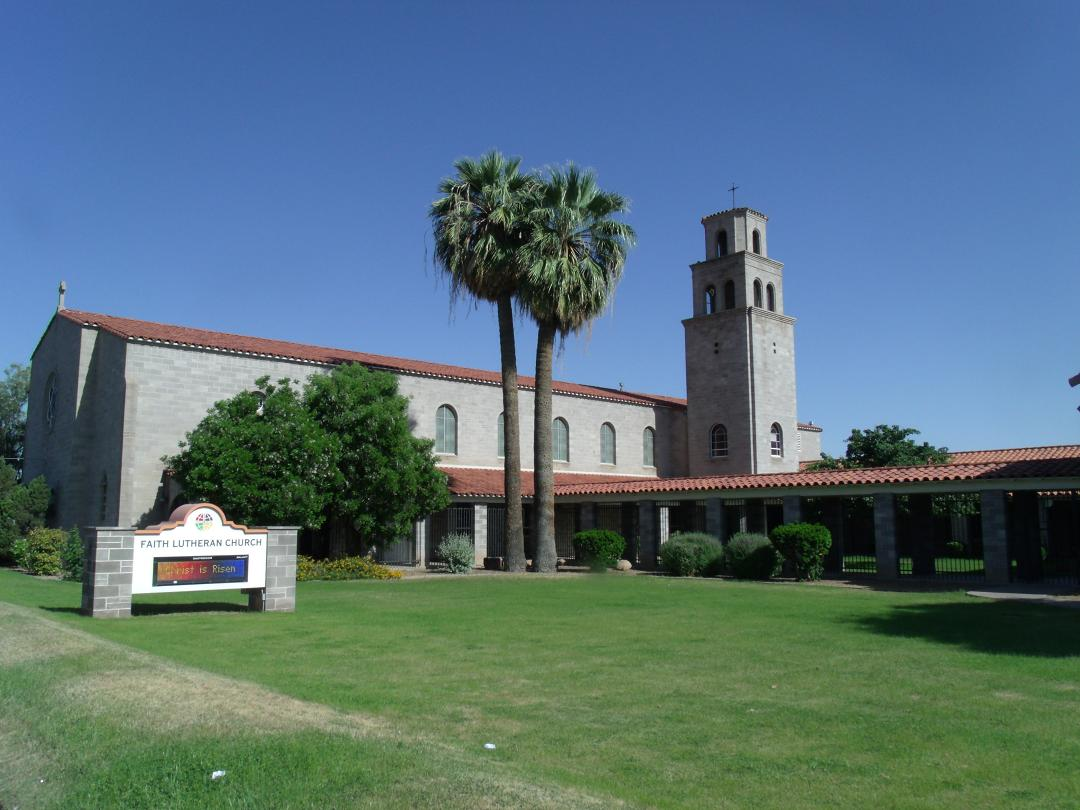
The Faith Lutheran Church was built in 1946 and is located at 801 E. Camelback Road. It is listed in the Phoenix Historic Property Register.

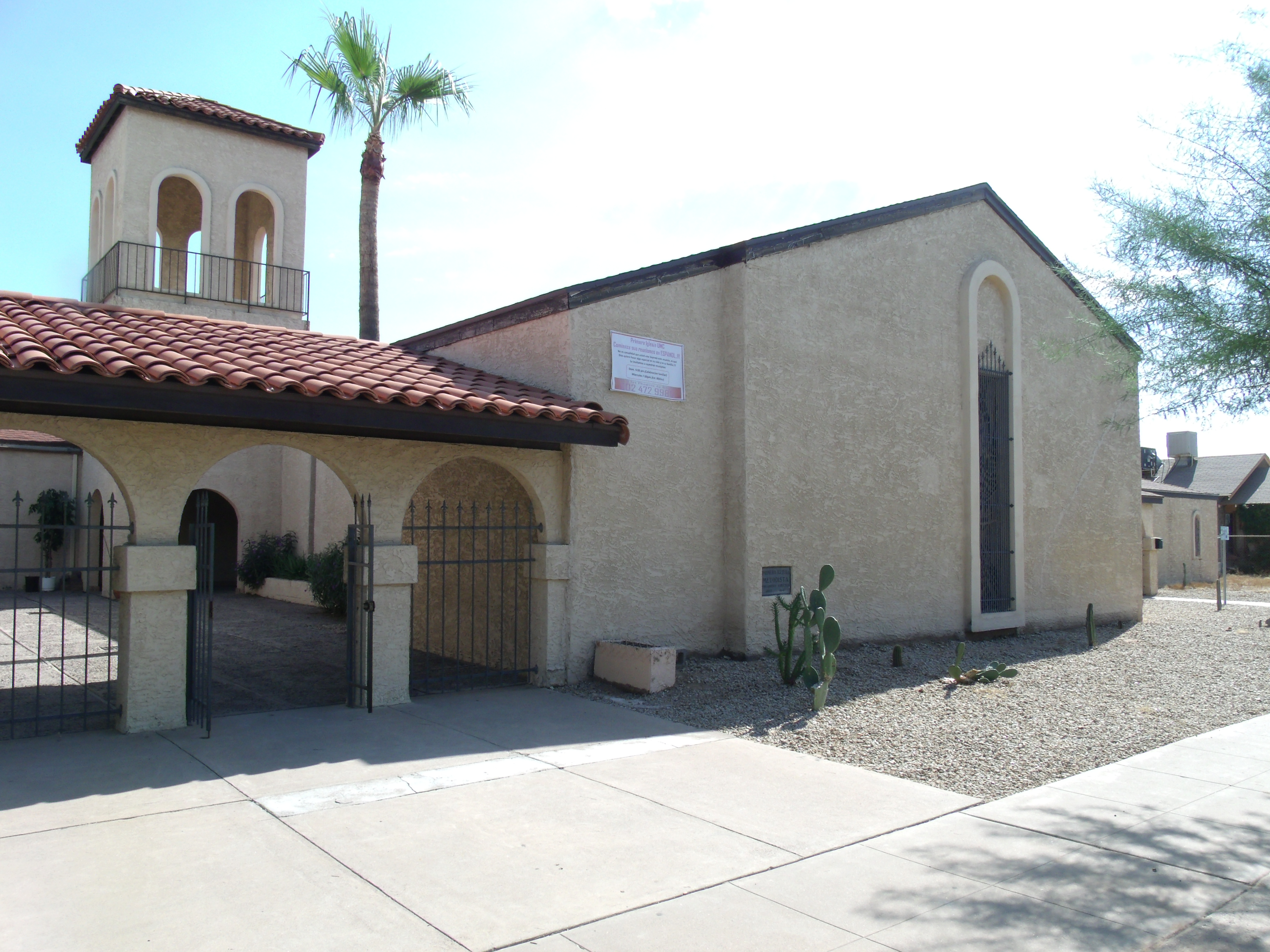
The Primera Iglesia Metodista (First Methodist Church) was built in 1947 and is located at 701 S. 1st Street. This property is recognized as historic by the Hispanic American Historic Property Survey of the City of Phoenix.

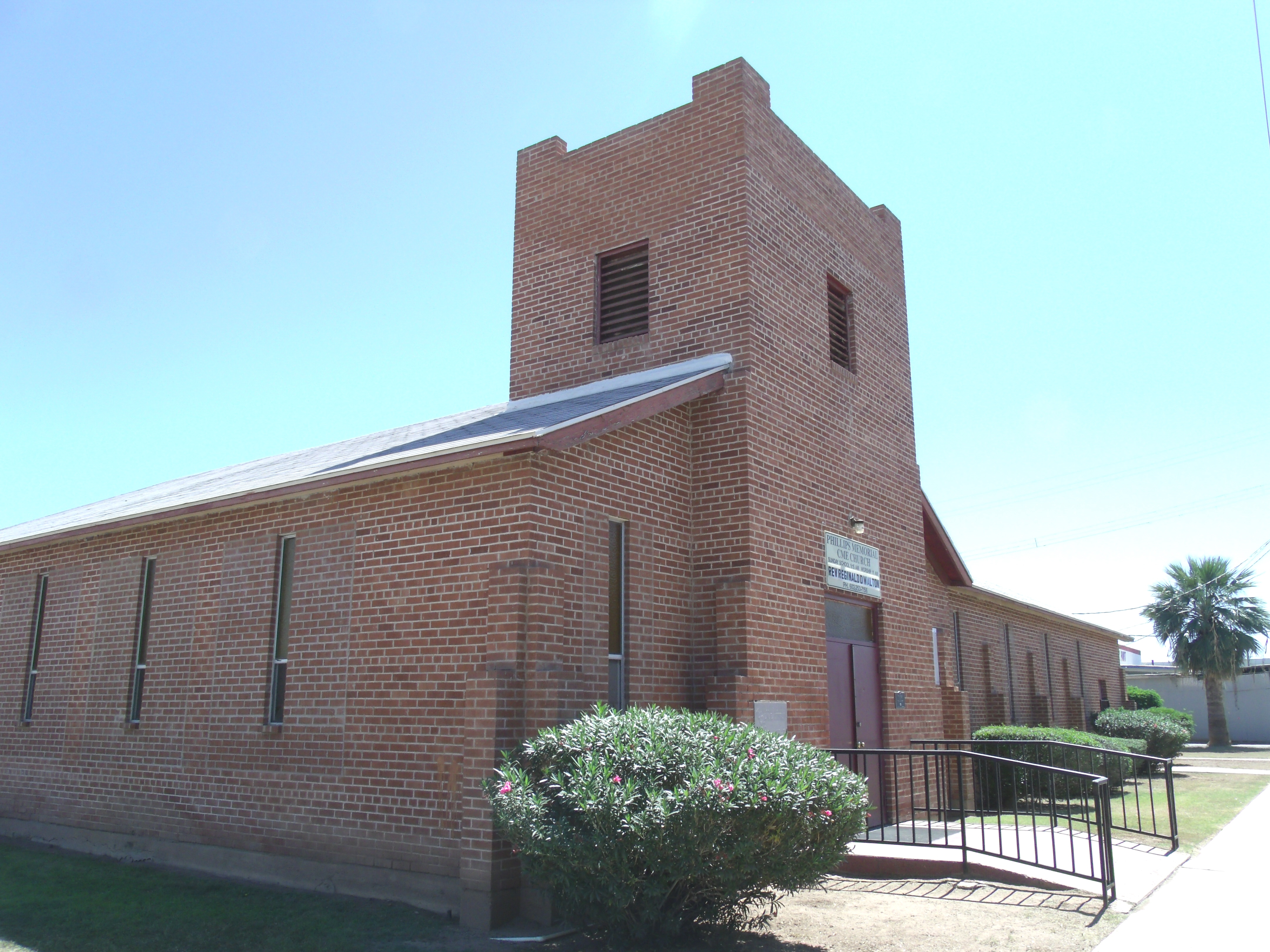
The Lucy Phillips Memorial C.M.E. Church was built in 1947 and is located at 1401 E. Adams Street. The church was built by the African-American community in Phoenix. It was named Lucy Phillips Memorial C.M.E. Church in honor of the wife of the first presiding bishop, the Rev. Charles Henry Phillips. The church was listed in the Phoenix Historic Property Register in June 2005.

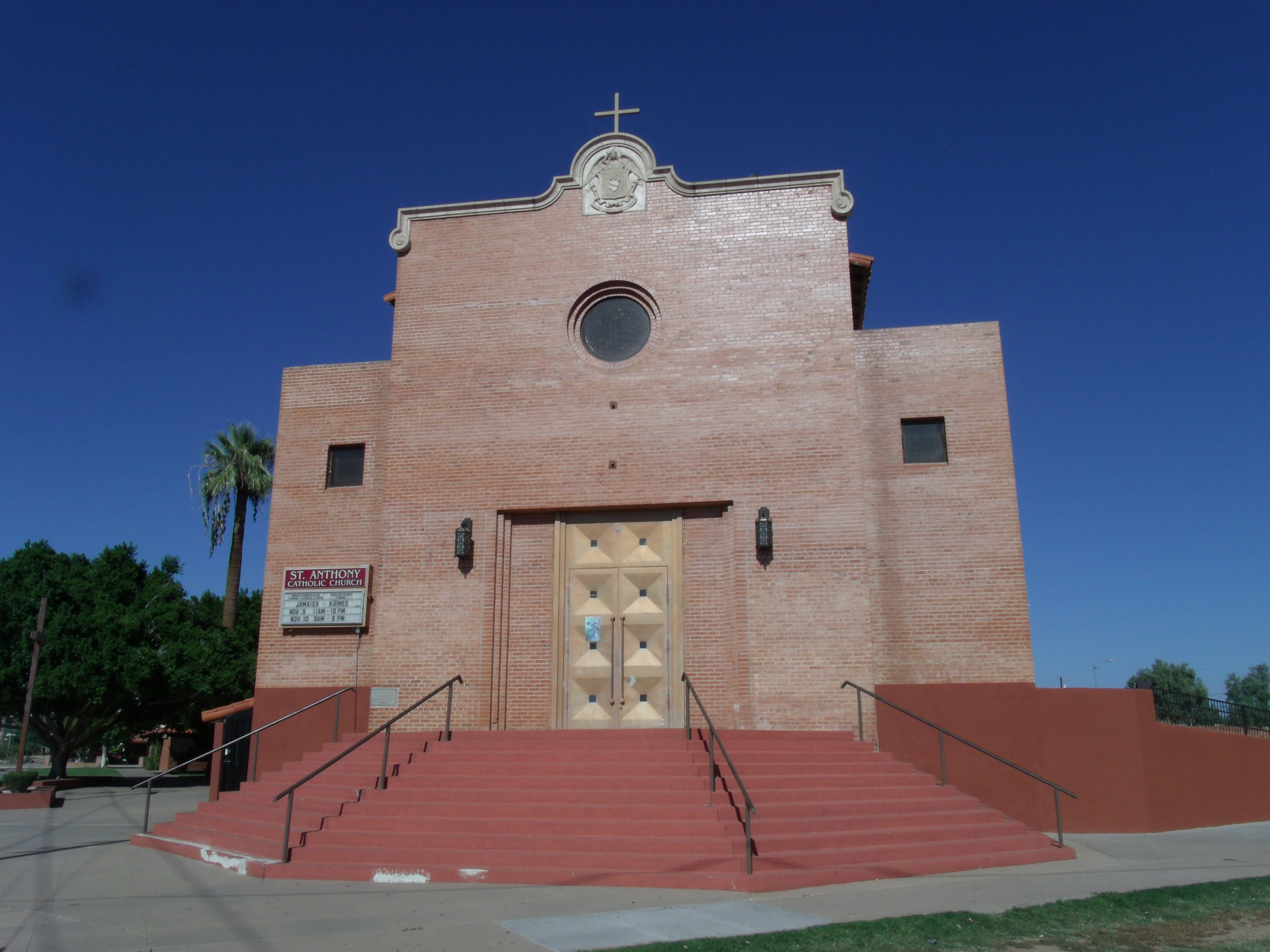
The St. Anthony Church was built in 1948 and is located at 909 S. 1st Street. This property is recognized as historic by the Hispanic American Historic Property Survey of the City of Phoenix.

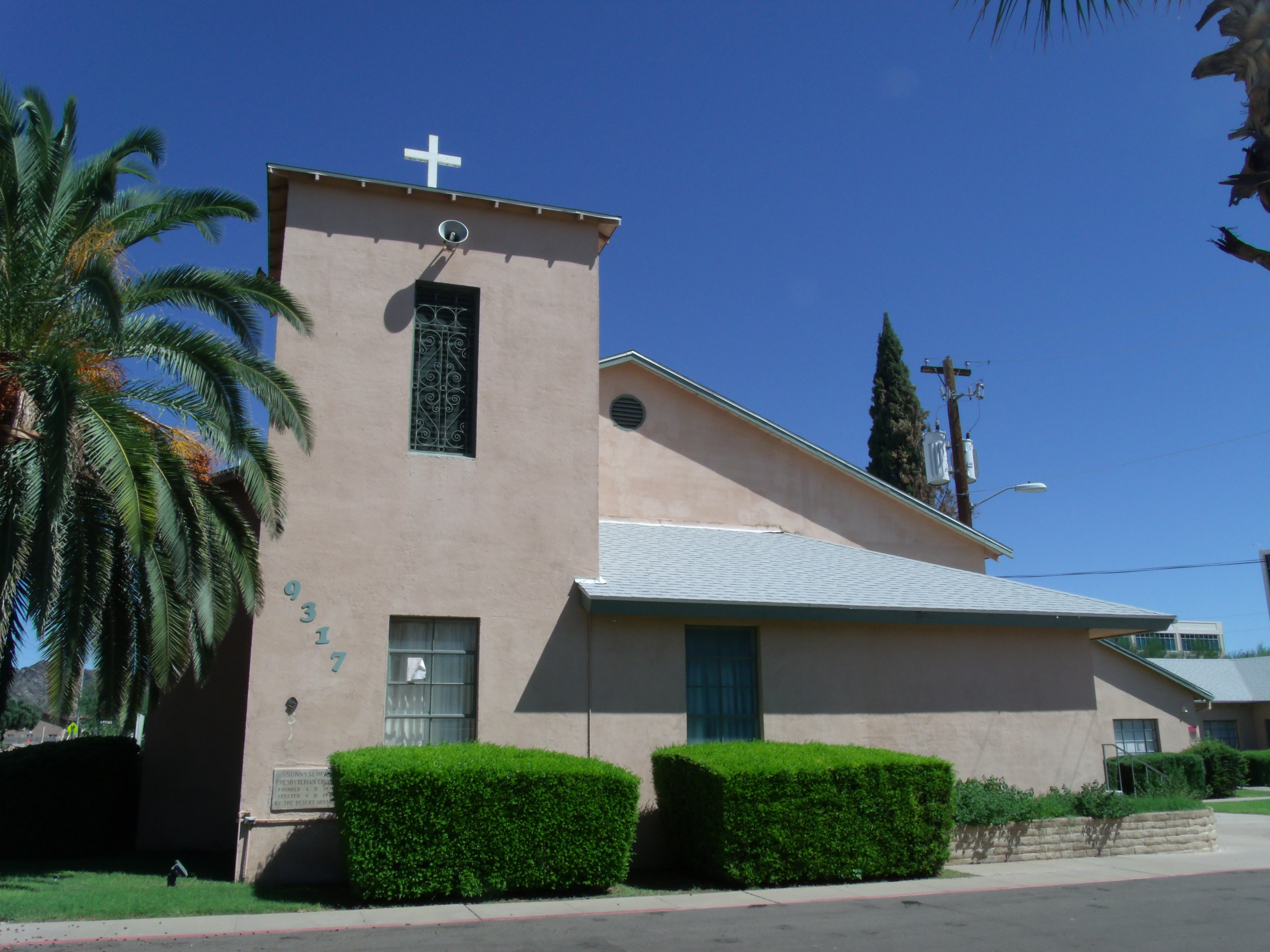
The Sunnyslope Presbyterian Church was founded in 1927 in Sunnyslope. The structure was built in 1949 and is located at 9317 N 2nd Street, in the Sunnyslope District of Phoenix. The church is listed in the Phoenix Historic Property Register.

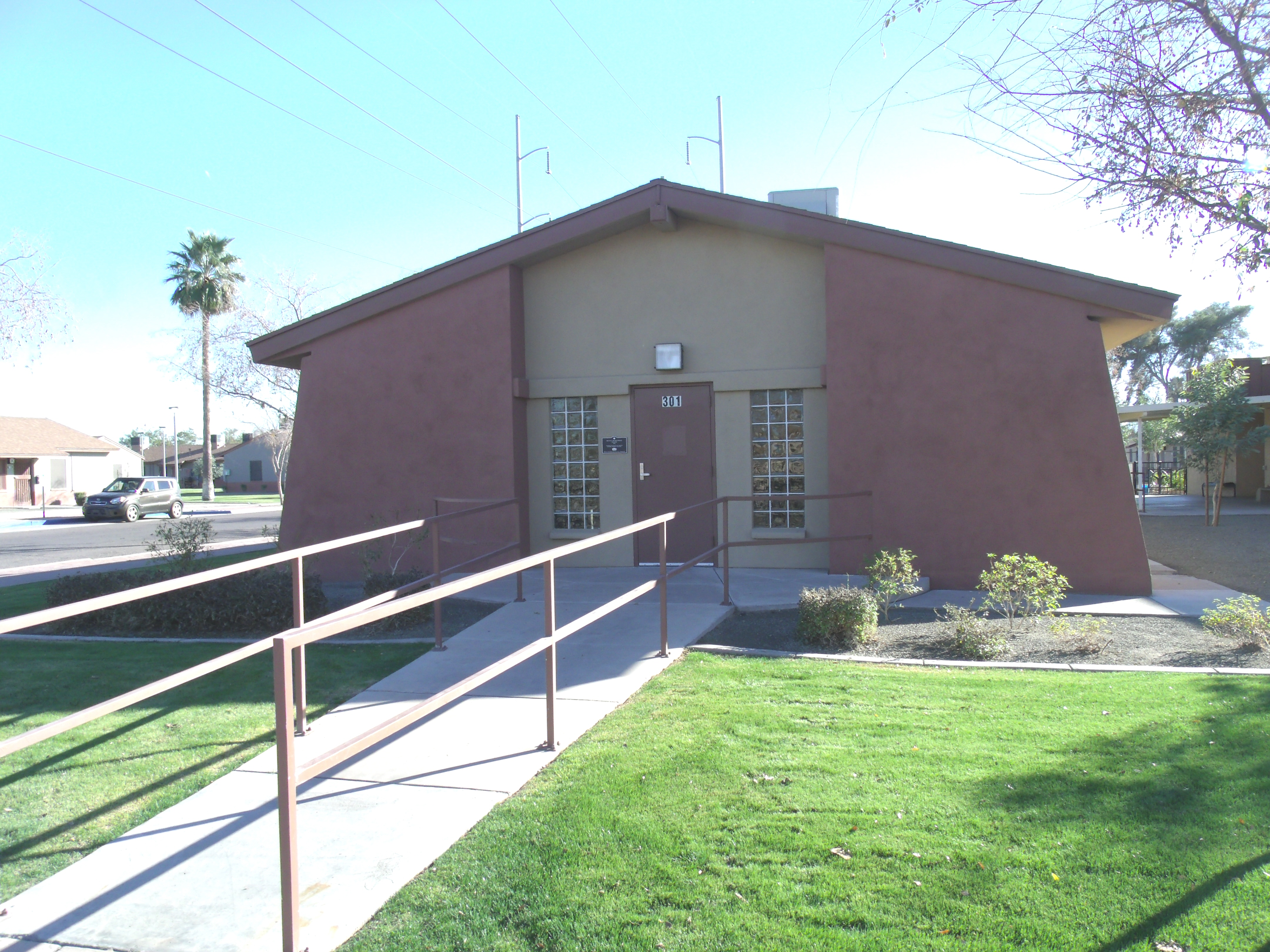
The building which once housed the historic Iglesia Betania Presbiteriana was constructed in 1950. It is located at 301 W Pima in Phoenix. This property is recognized as historic by the Hispanic American Historic Property Survey.

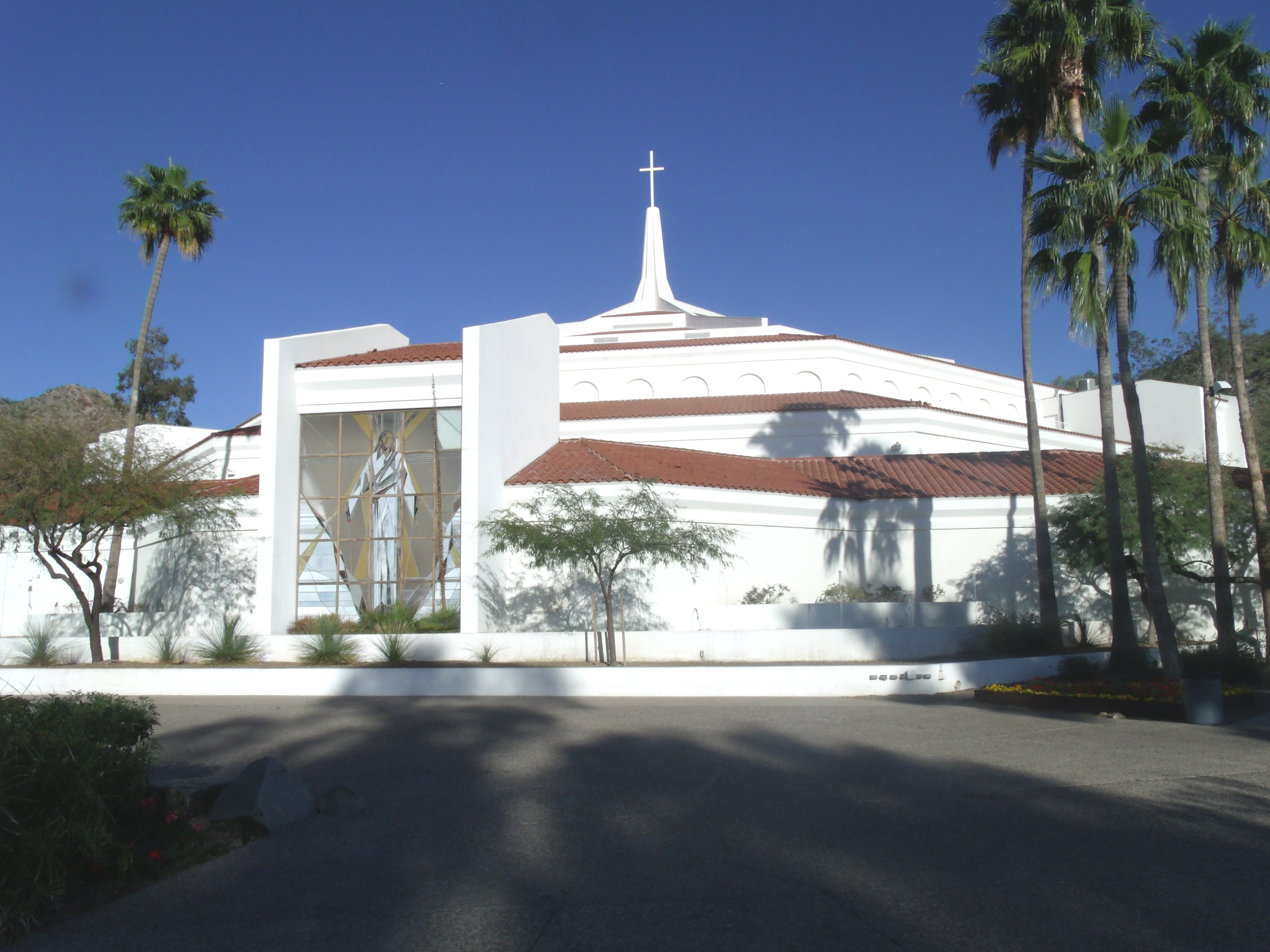
The Pavilion of Light of the Phoenix First Assembly of God, or simply "Phoenix First", is an Assemblies of God megachurch. The structure was built in the 1980s and is located at 13613 N. Cave Creek Road. As of 2011, it was the second largest Assembly of God church in the U.S. with an average Sunday attendance of 10,000.

=== Educational institutions ===
The first school in Phoenix was established in 1873. It was known as the Little Adobe School and it was located in 202 N. Central Avenue where the San Carlos Hotel currently stands. Schools were segregated then and therefore, so were many of the historic schools on this list. The Phoenix Indian School was established in 1891 under the federal "assimilation" policy which sought to regimentalize and culturally exterminate Native American students. African-American students were only allowed to attend racially segregated schools such as the Dunbar School which was built in 1925, the Phoenix Union Colored High School (Later renamed George Washington Carver High School) built in 1926, and the Booker T. Washington Elementary School built in 1928.

Historic educational institutions in Phoenix, Arizona
(NRHP = National Register of Historic Places)
(PHPR = Phoenix Historic Property Register)
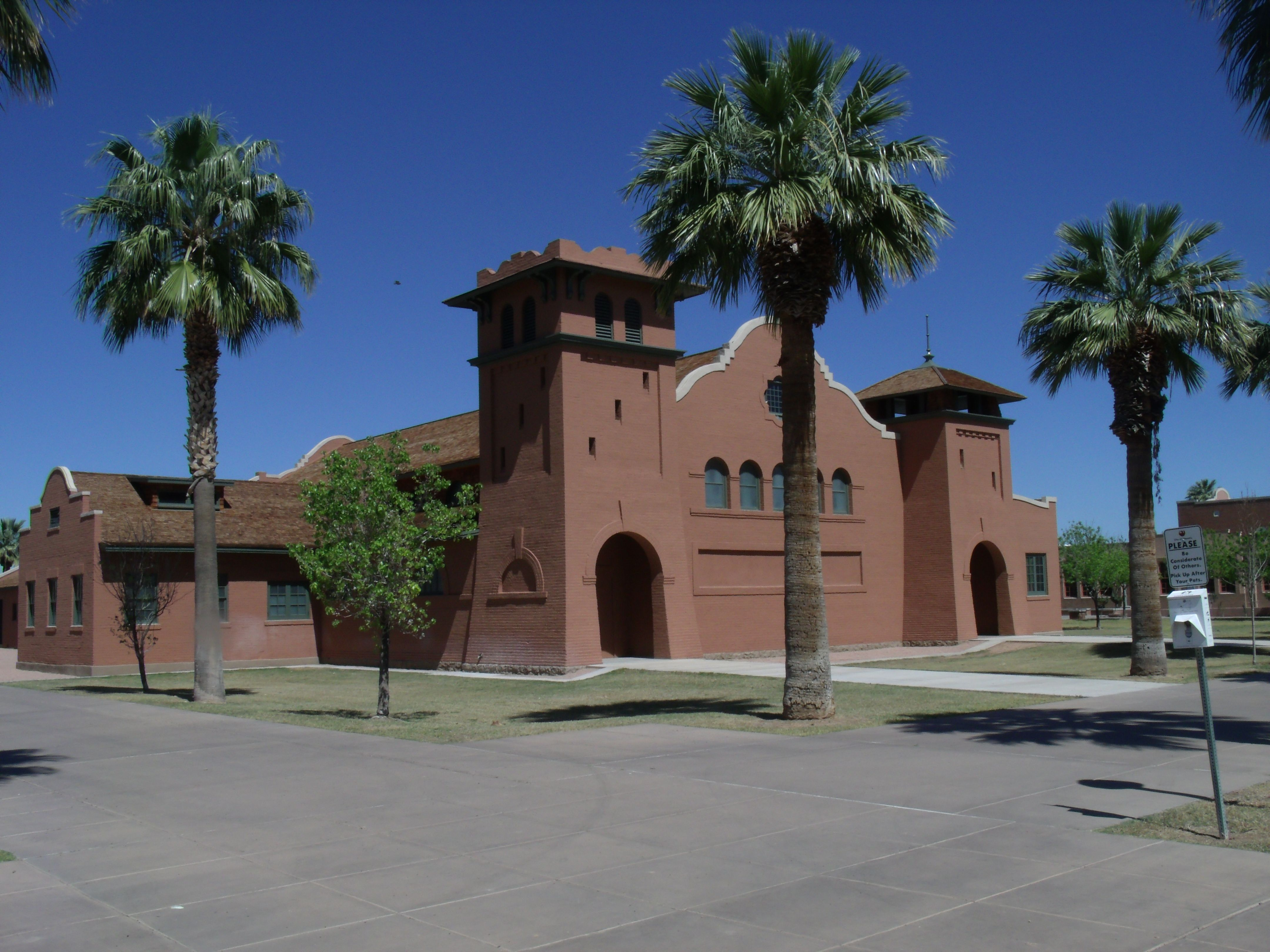
The Phoenix Indian School main building was built in 1891 and is located at 300 E. Indian School Rd. It was listed in the National Register of Historic Places on May 31, 2001, ref. #01000521.

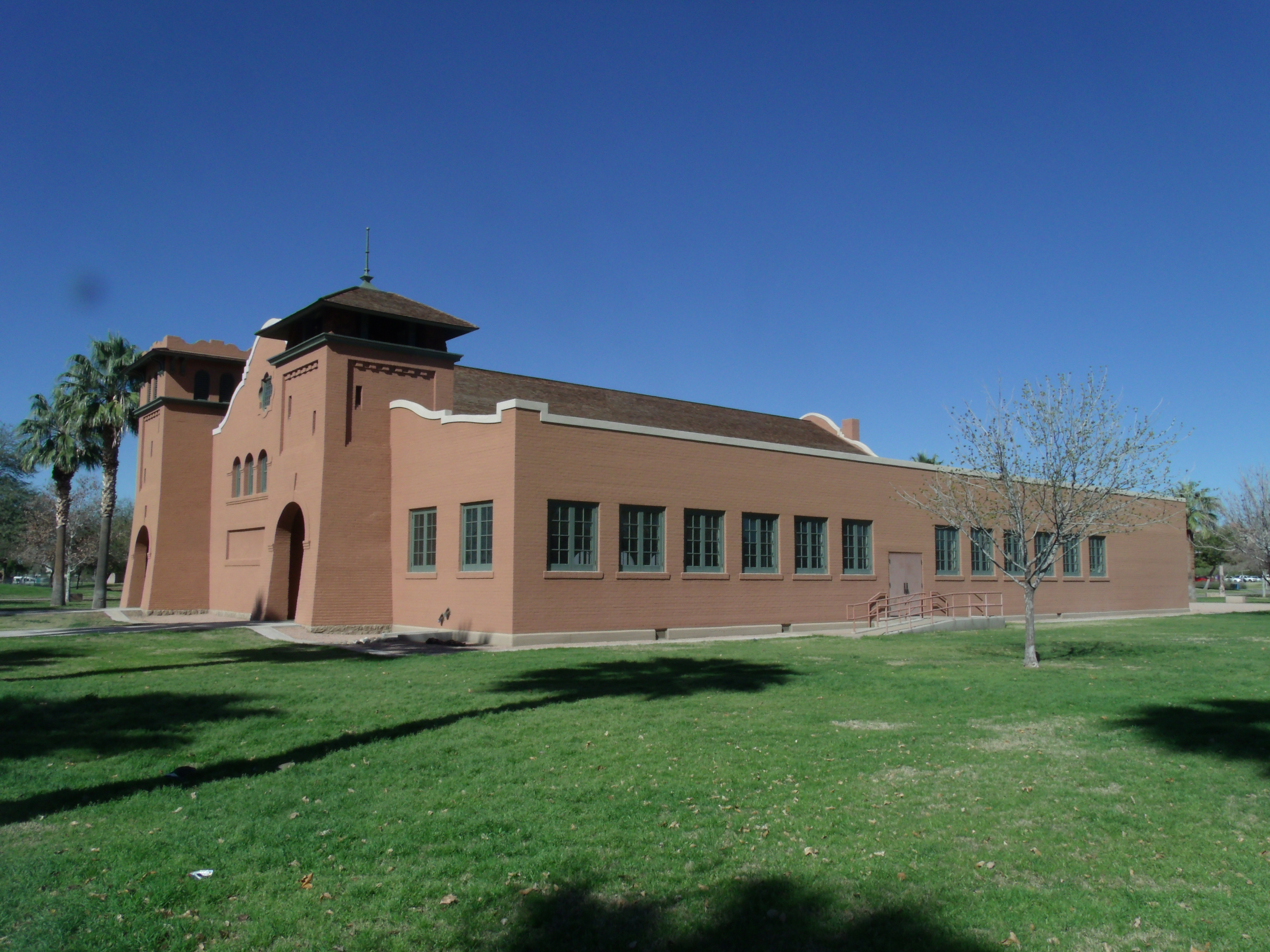
Different view of the Phoenix Indian School, located in the compounds of Phoenix's Steele Park in 300 E. Indian School Rd.

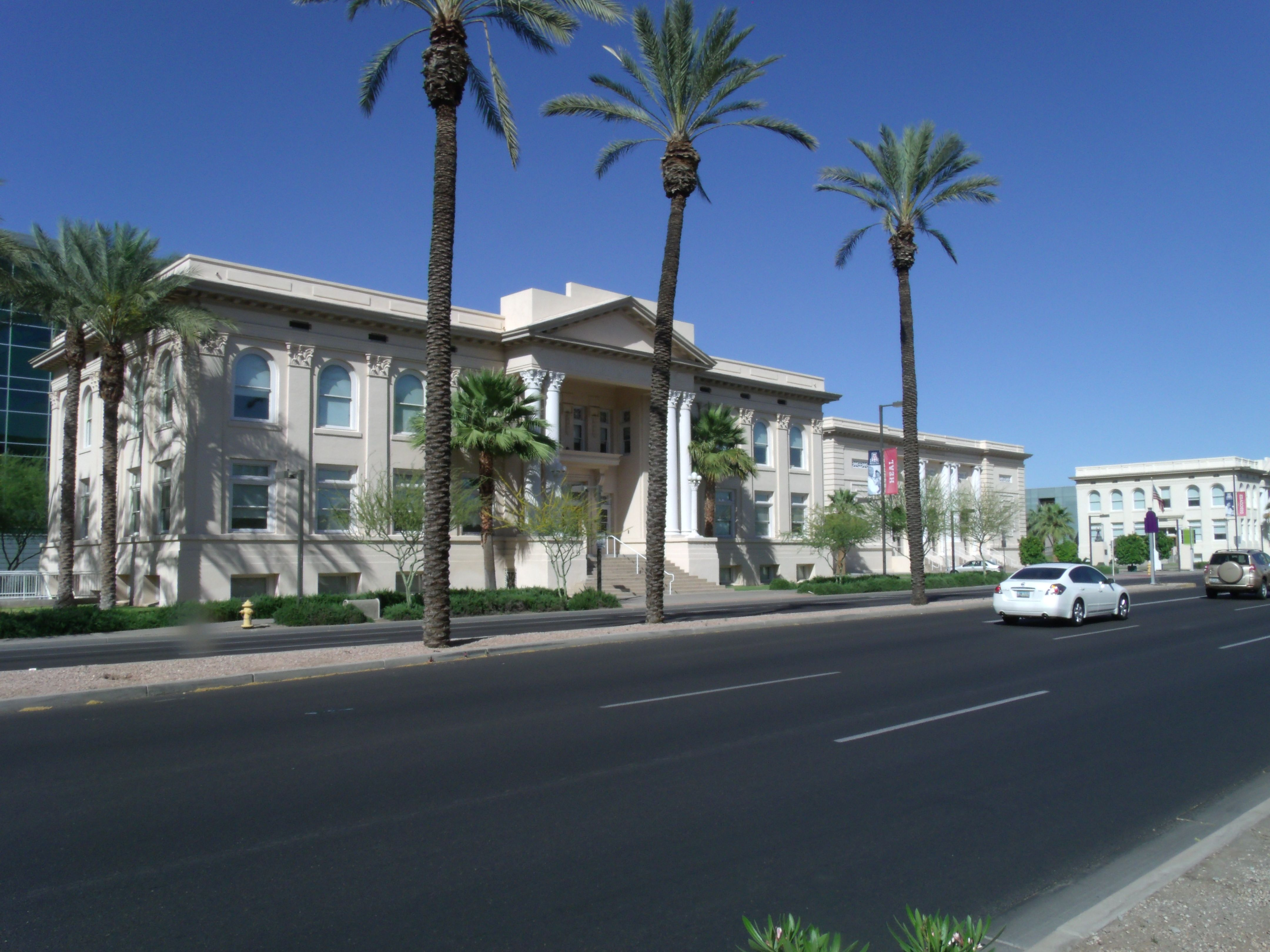
Phoenix Union High School was built in 1912 and is located at 512 E. Van Buren. It was listed in the National Register of Historic Places on July 15, 1982, ref. #82002085.

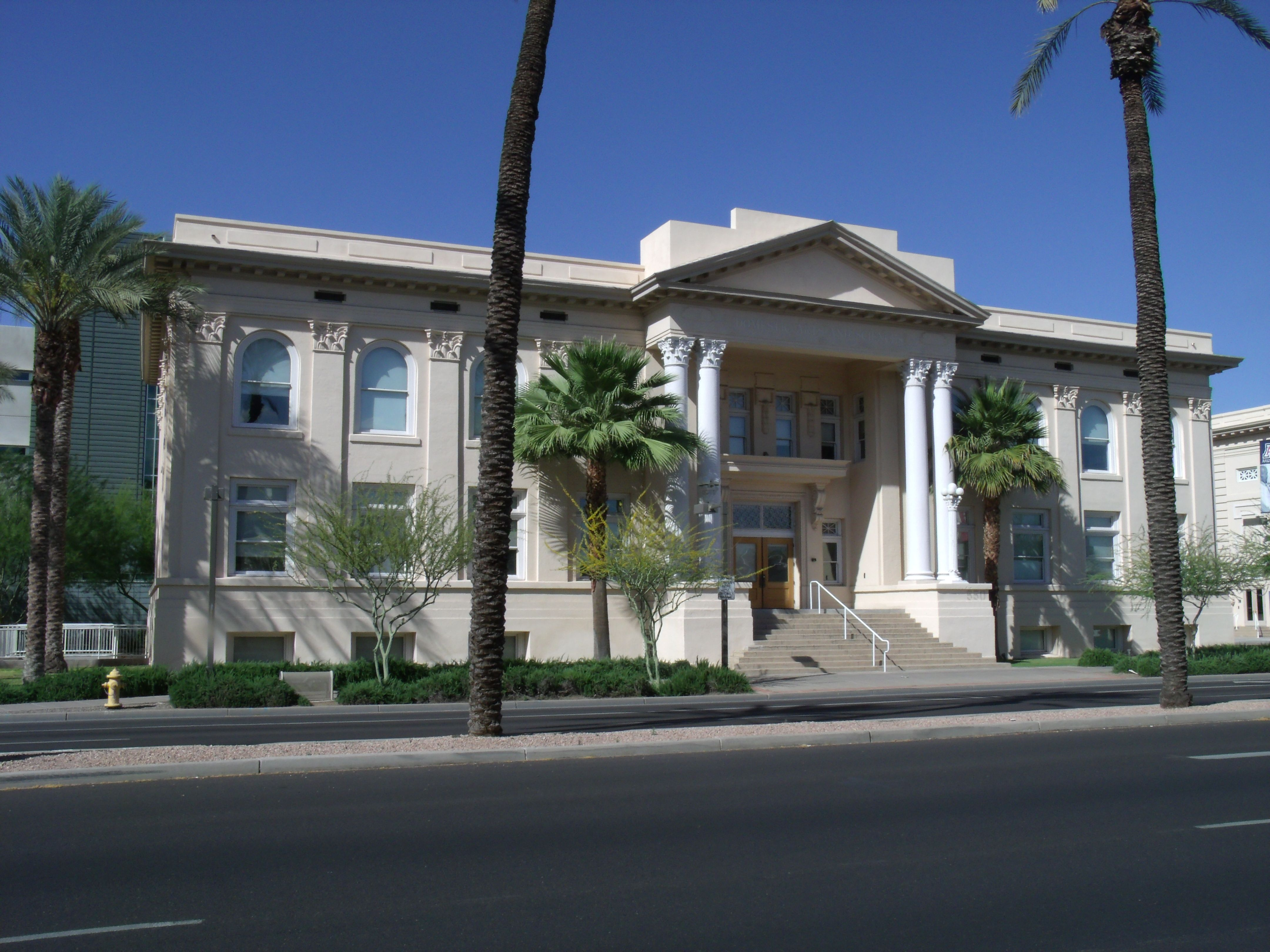
Phoenix Union High School Domestic Arts building was built in 1912 and is located at 512 E. Van Buren. It was listed in the National Register of Historic Places on July 15, 1982, ref. #82002085.

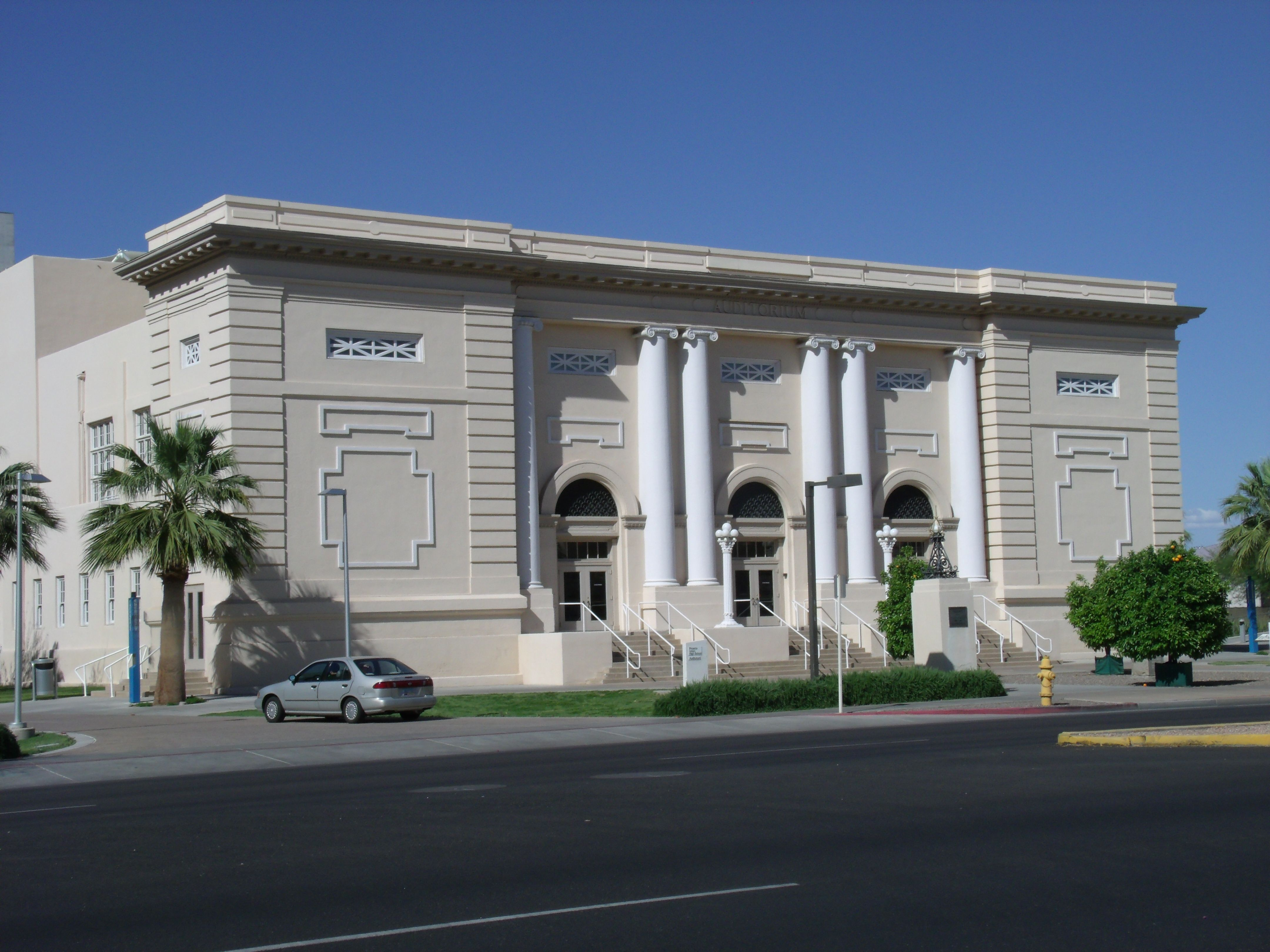
Phoenix Union High School Auditorium was built in 1912 and is located at 512 E. Van Buren. It was listed in the National Register of Historic Places on July 15, 1982, ref. #82002085.

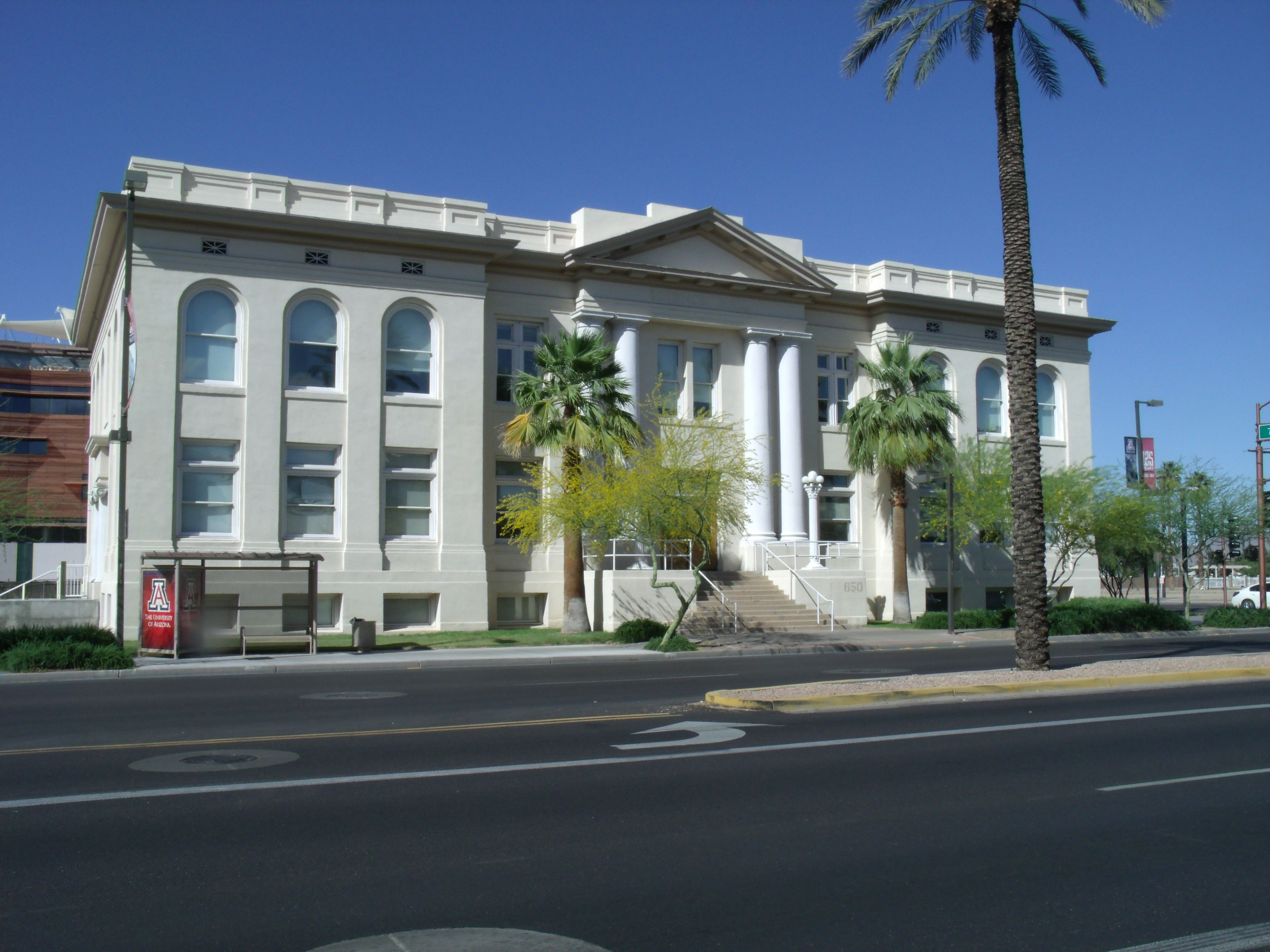
Phoenix Union High School Science building was built in 1912 and is located at 512 E. Van Buren. It was listed in the National Register of Historic Places on July 15, 1982, ref. #82002085.

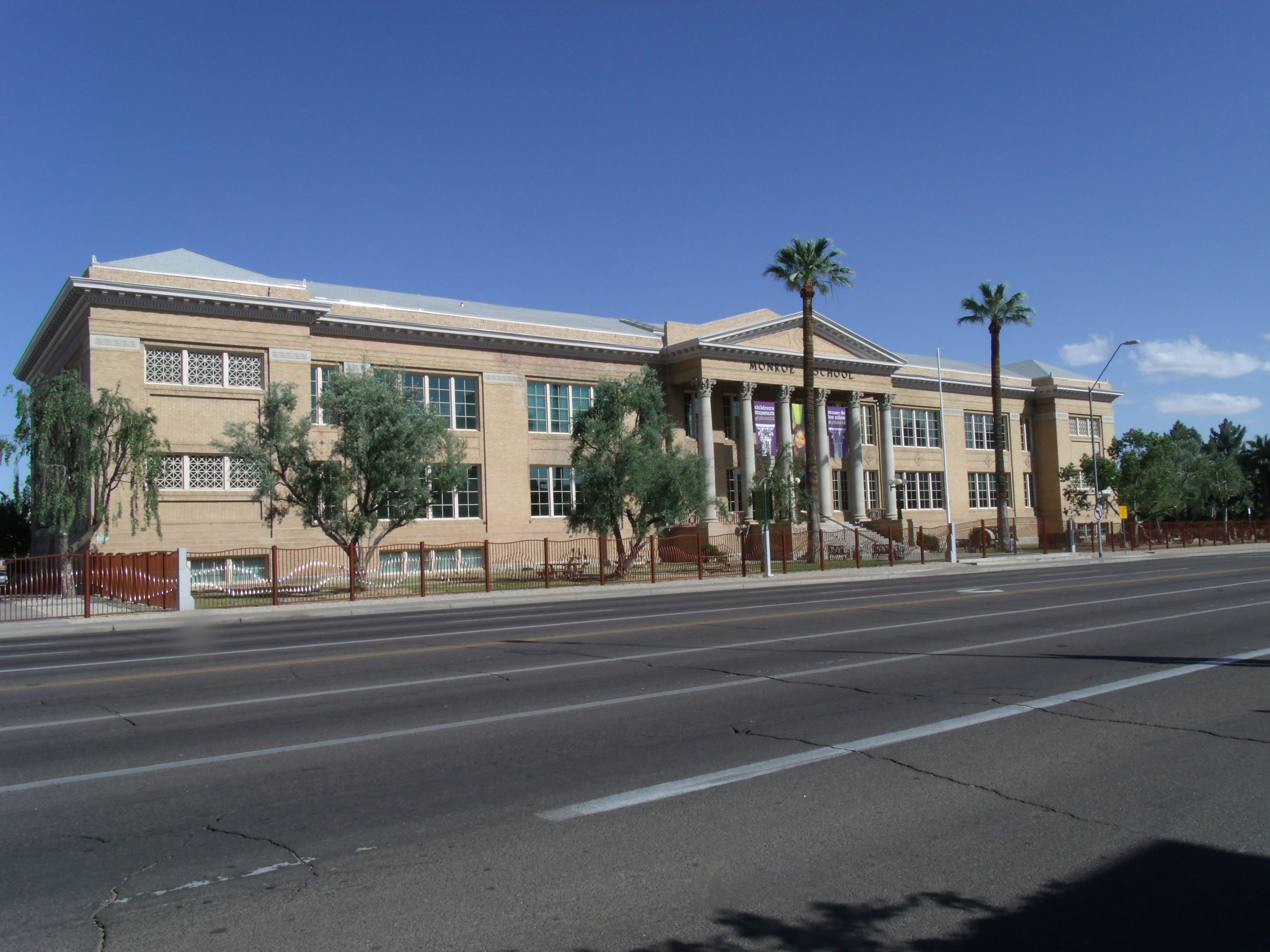
Monroe High School was built in 1914 and is located at 215 N. 7th St. It was listed in the National Register of Historic Places on August 26, 1977, ref. #77000237.

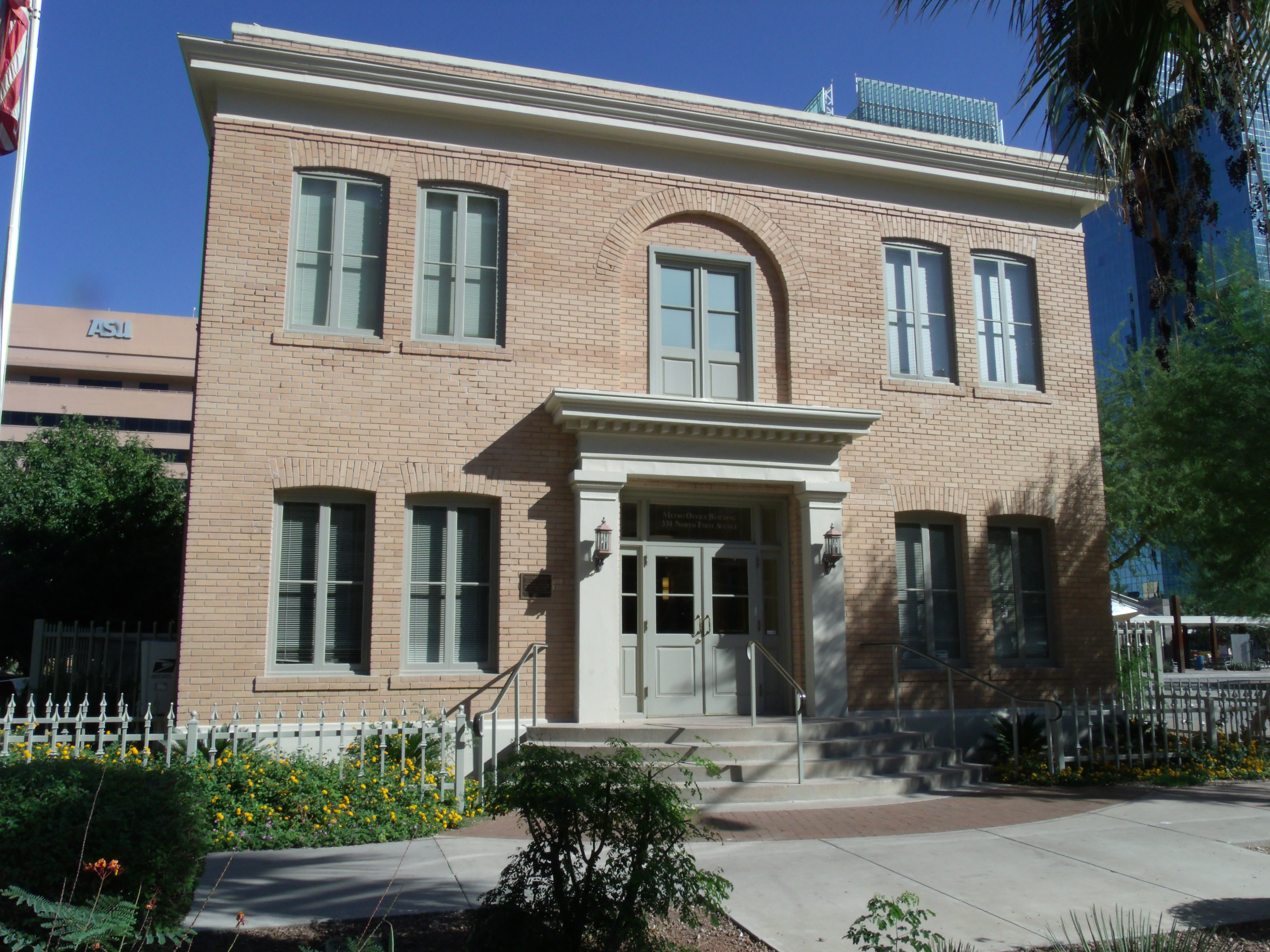
The Phoenix Elementary School District #1 Administration Building was built in 1917 and is located at 331 N. 1st Avenue. the building was listed in the Phoenix Historic Property Register in October 1996.

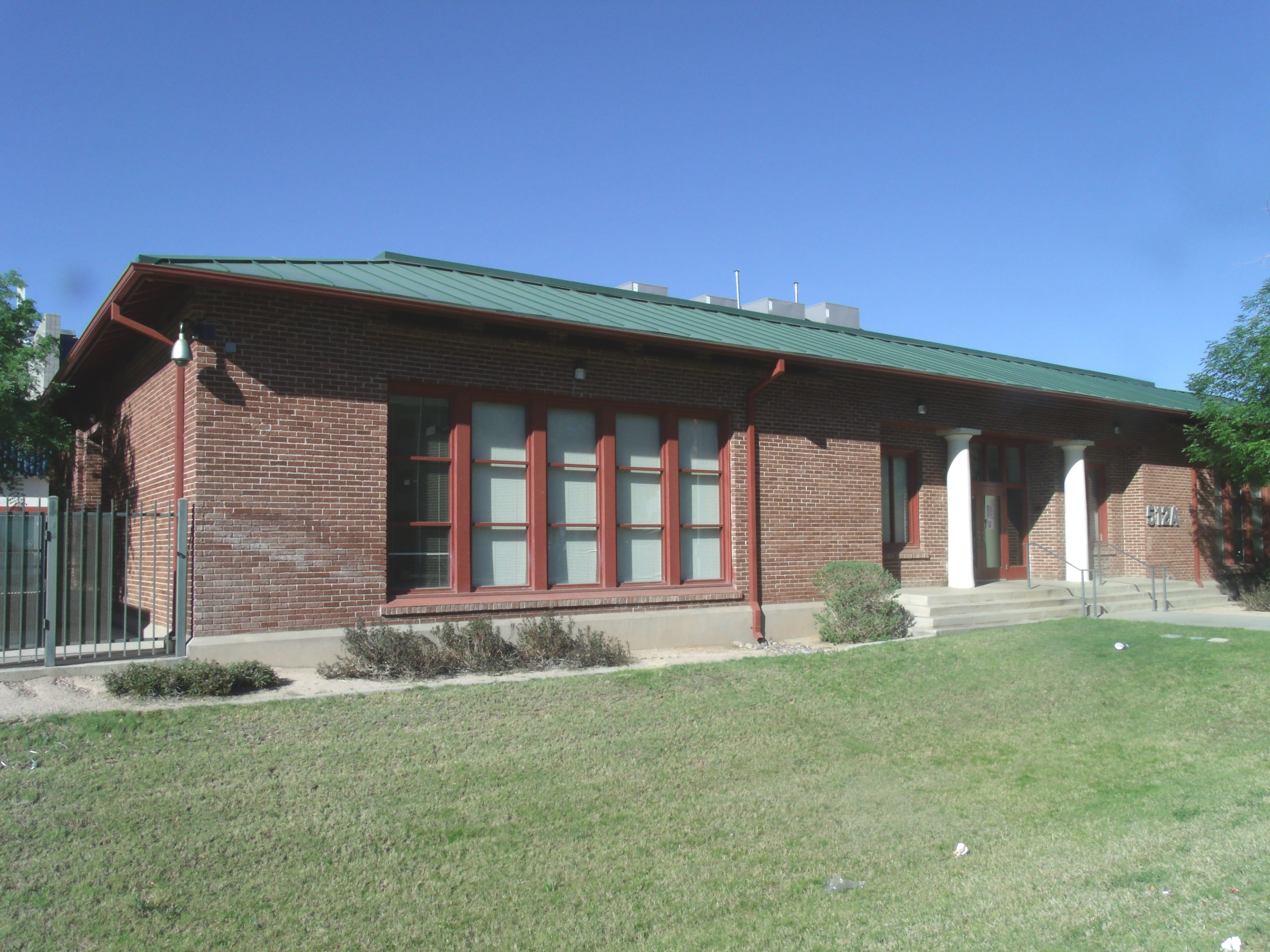
The McKinley School was built in 1919 and is located at 512 E. Pierce St. The property was listed in the Phoenix Historic Property Register in September 2004.

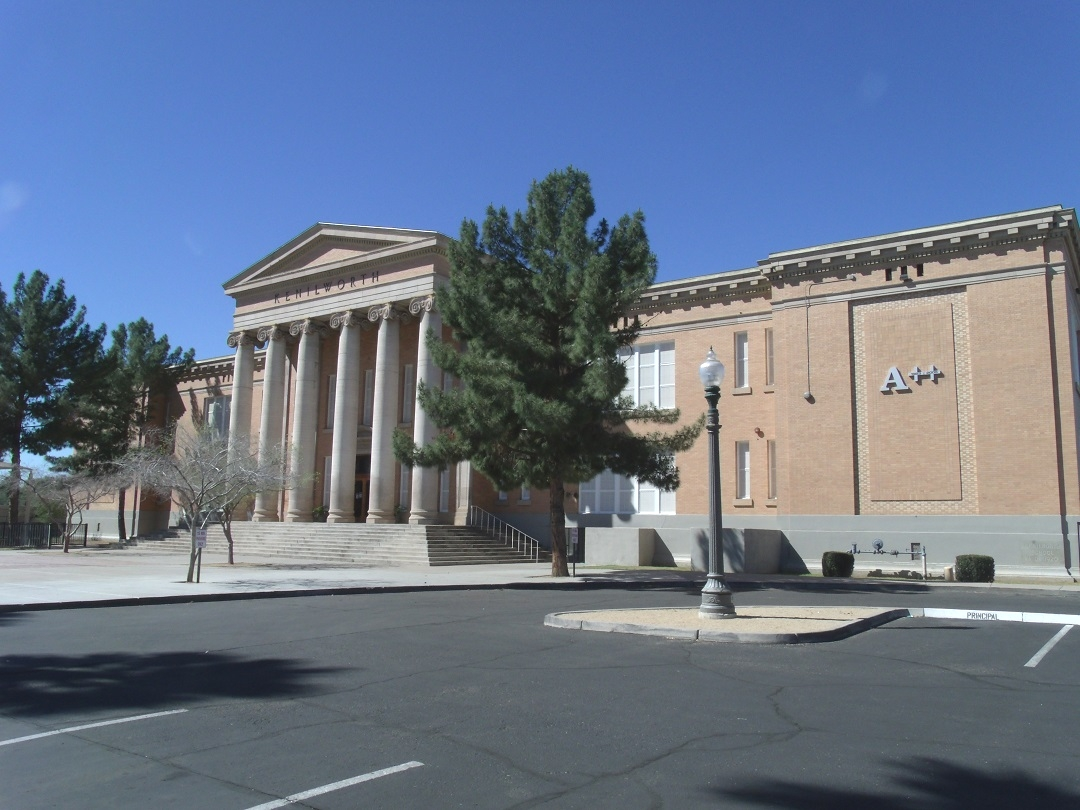
The Kenilworth School was built in 1919 and is located at 1210 N. 5th Avenue. It was listed in the National Register of Historic Places on March 25, 1982, reference #82002083.

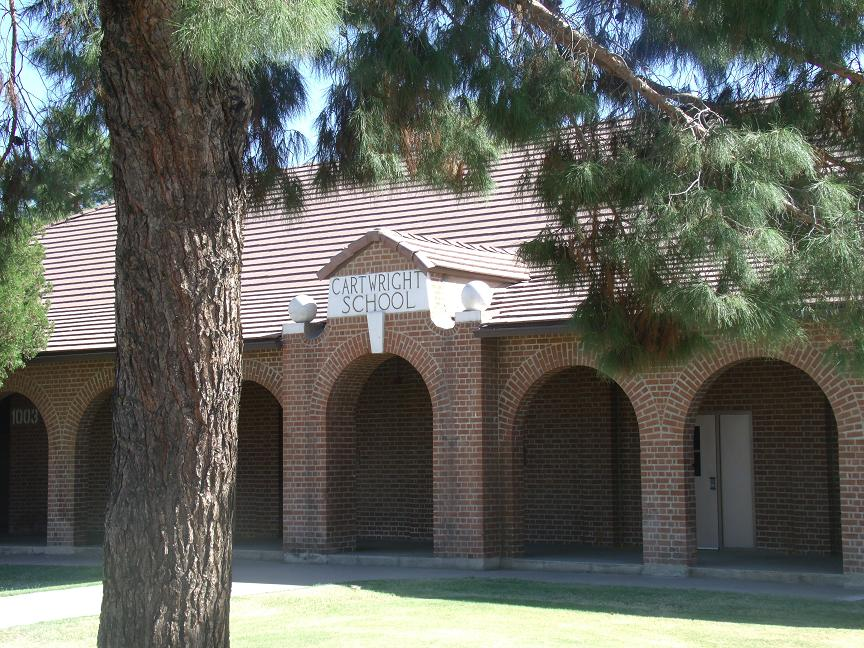
The current Cartwright School was built in 1921 and is located at 5833 W. Thomas Rd. It was listed in the National Register of Historic Places on August 12, 1993, ref. #93000739.

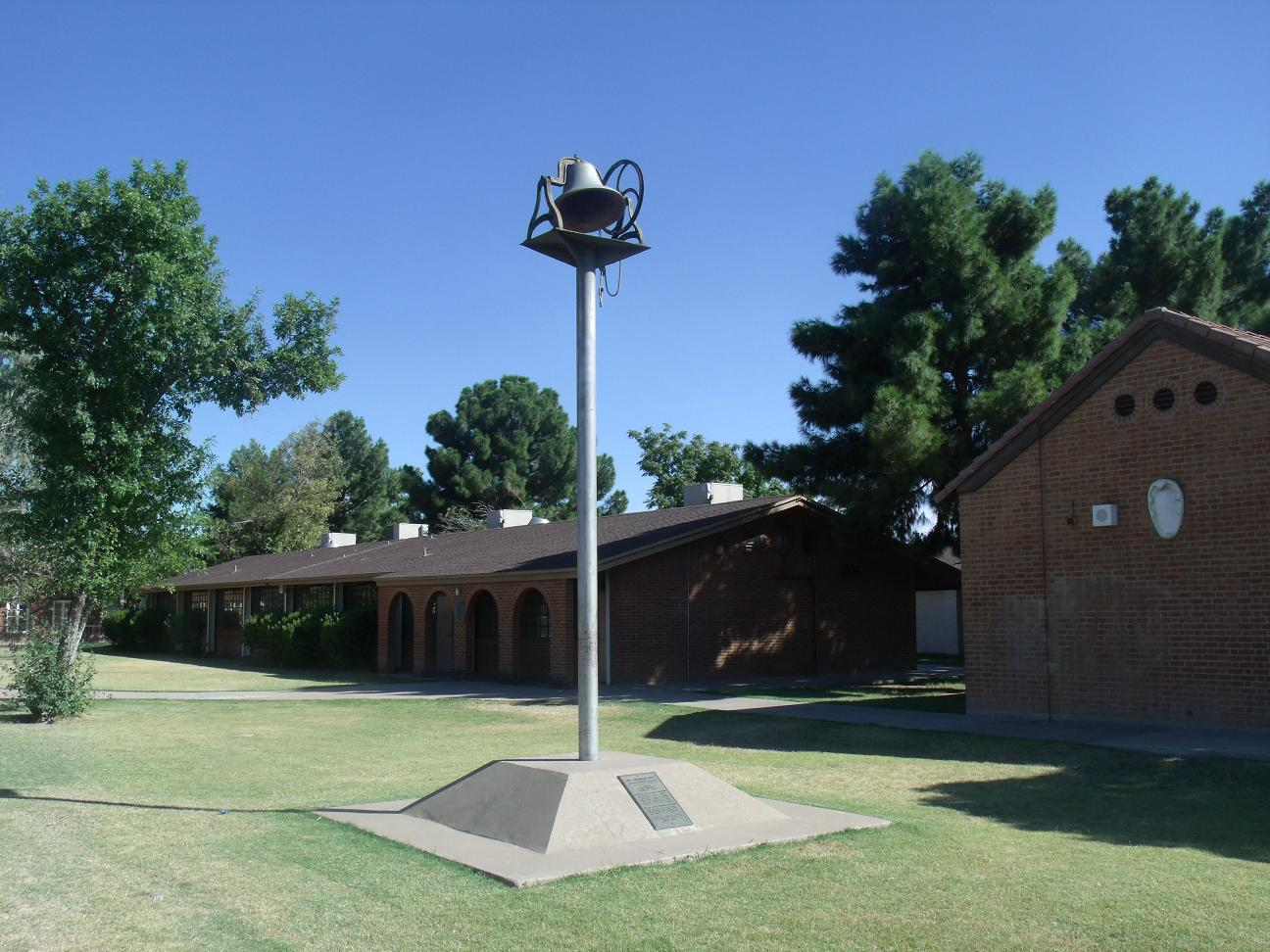
The first Cartwright one-room school house was built in 1910. This is the original 1910 Cartwright School bell.

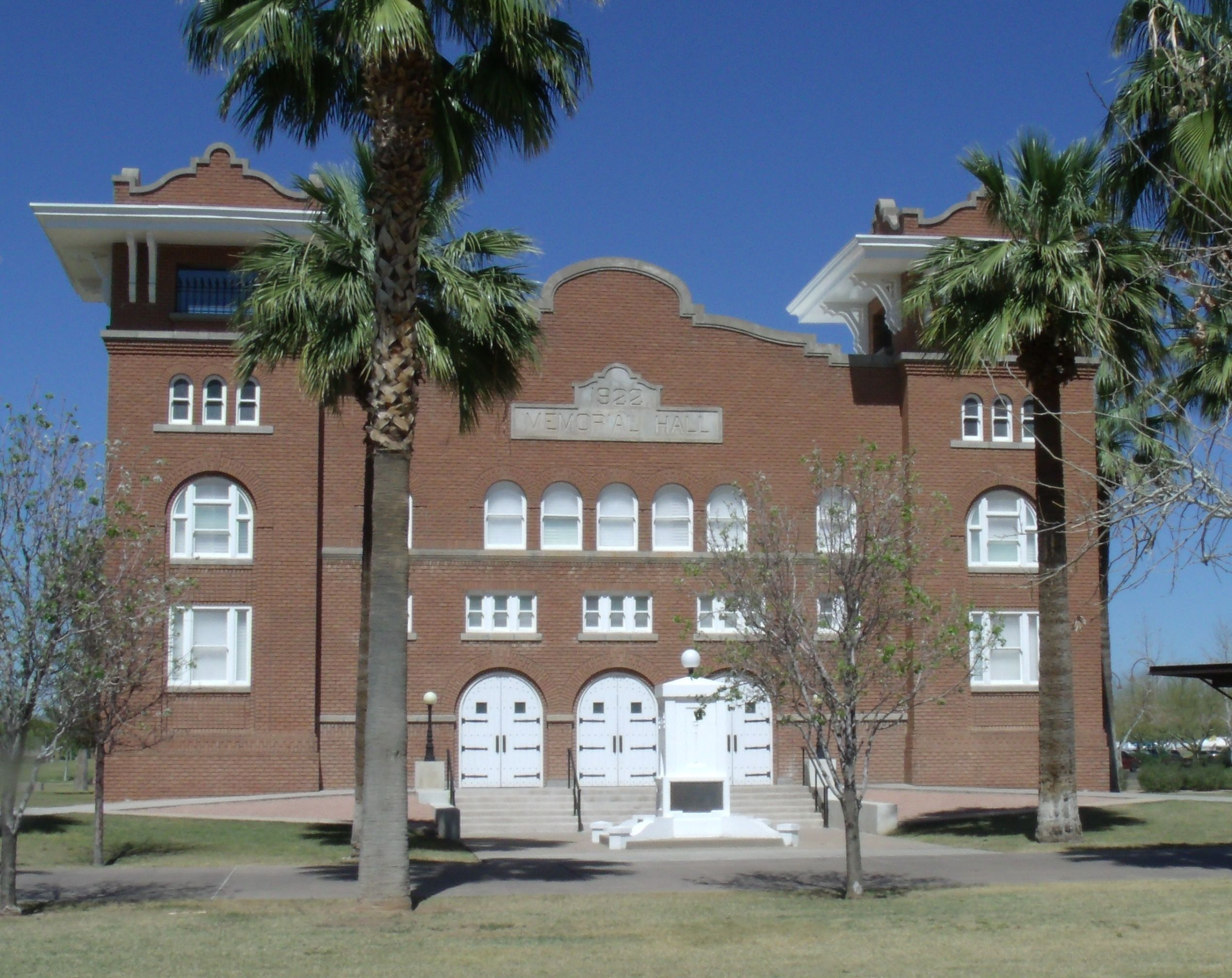
Phoenix Indian School Memorial Hall was built in 1922 and is located at 300 E. Indian School Rd. It was listed in the National Register of Historic Places on May 31, 2001, ref. #01000521.

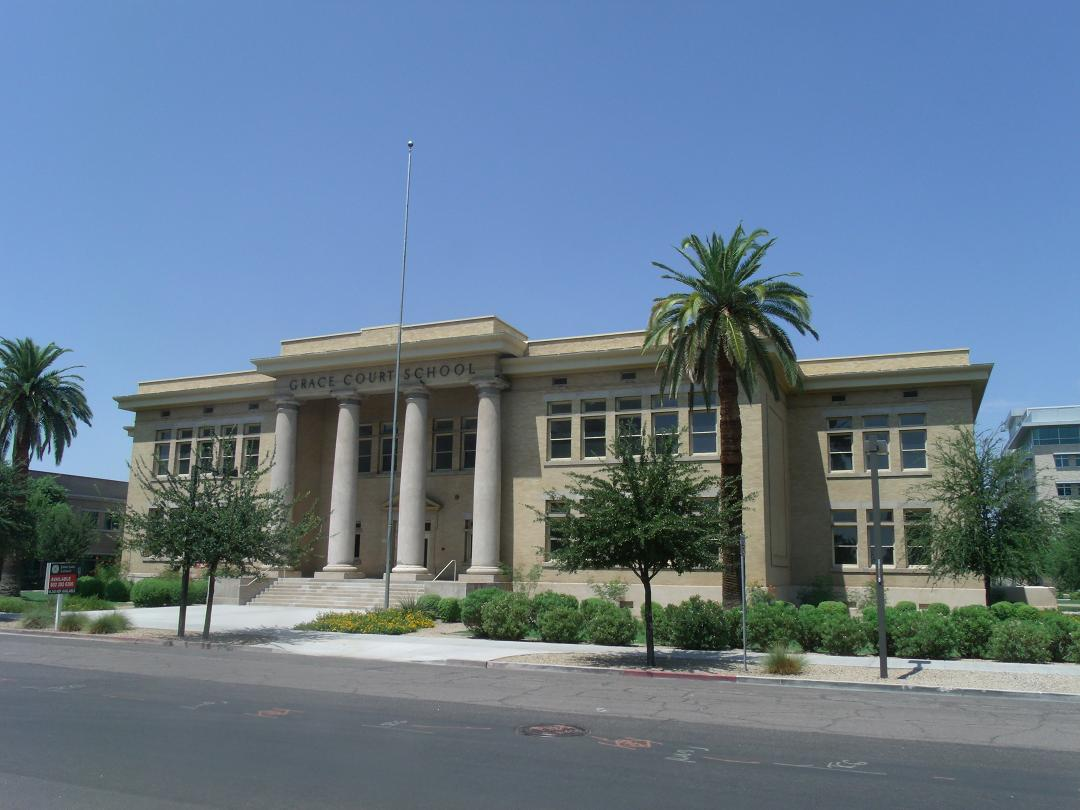
Adams School (now Grace Court School) was built in 1924 and located at 800 W. Adams St. It was listed in the National Register of Historic Places on November 29, 1979, ref. #79000418.

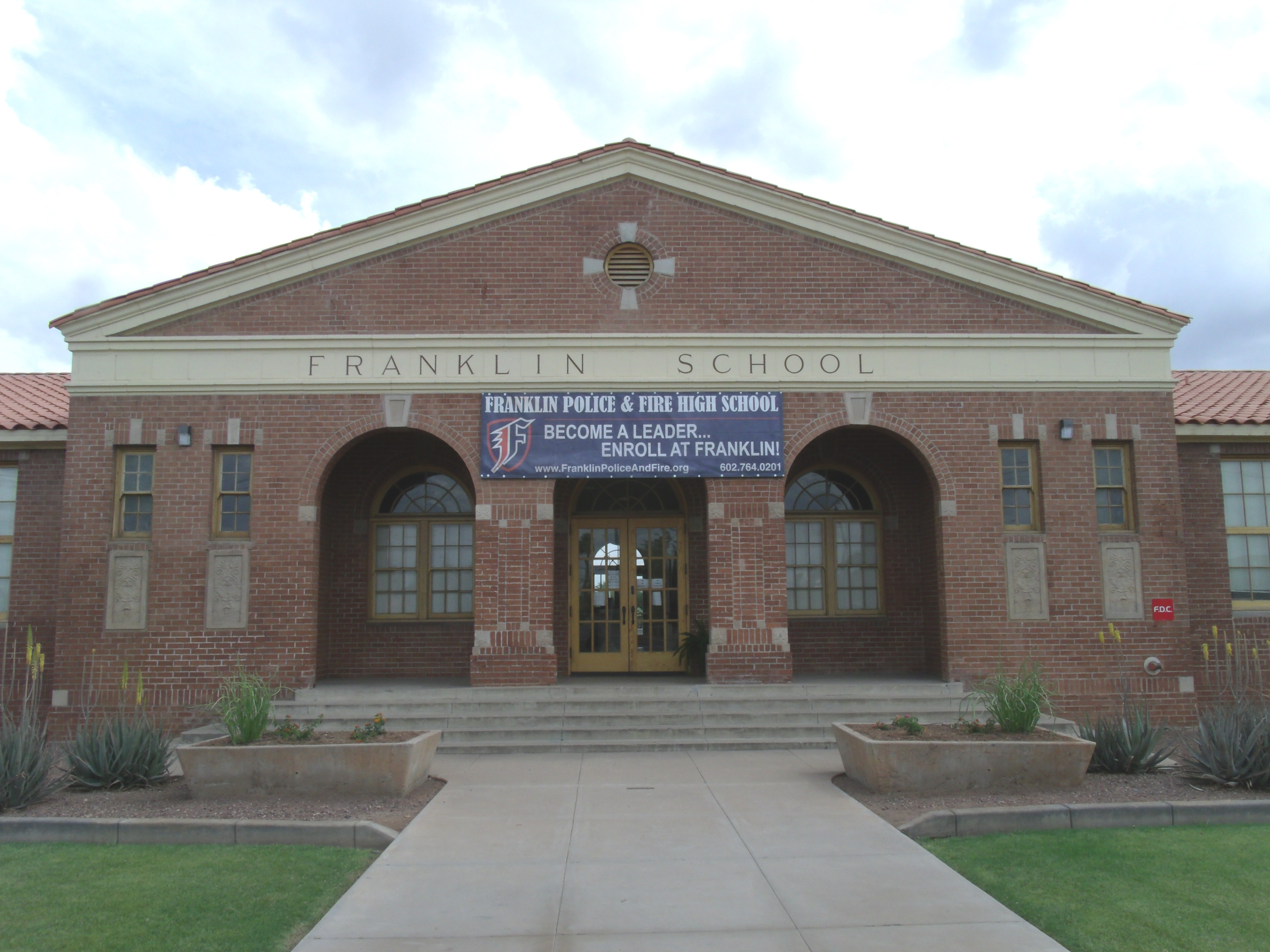
Franklin High School was built in 1925 and is located at 1625 W. McDowell Rd. It was listed in the National Register of Historic Places on August 12, 1993, reference: #93000814.

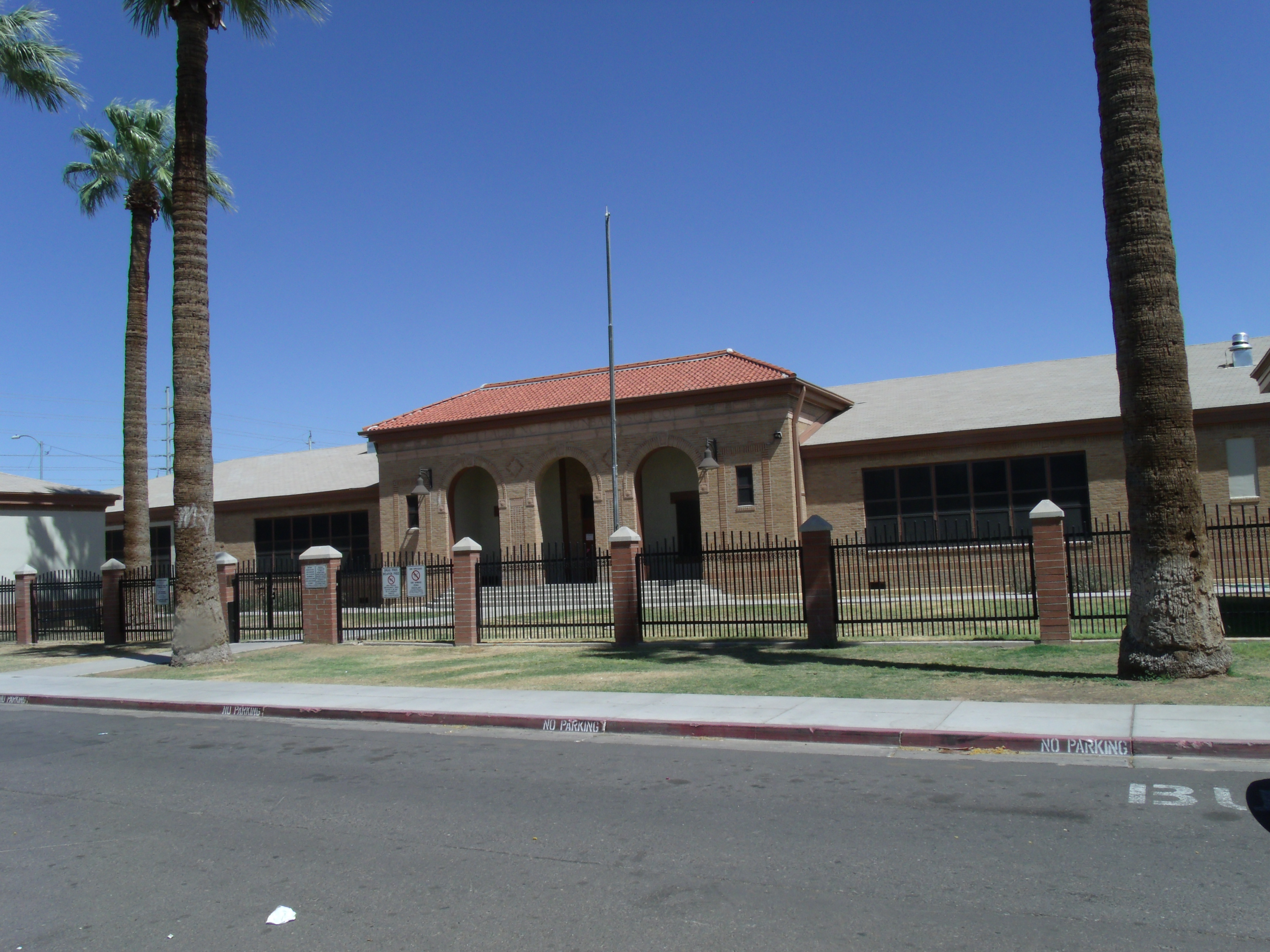
Dunbar School was built in 1925 and is located at 707 W. Grant St. It was listed in the National Register of Historic Places on August 12, 1993, ref. #93000740.

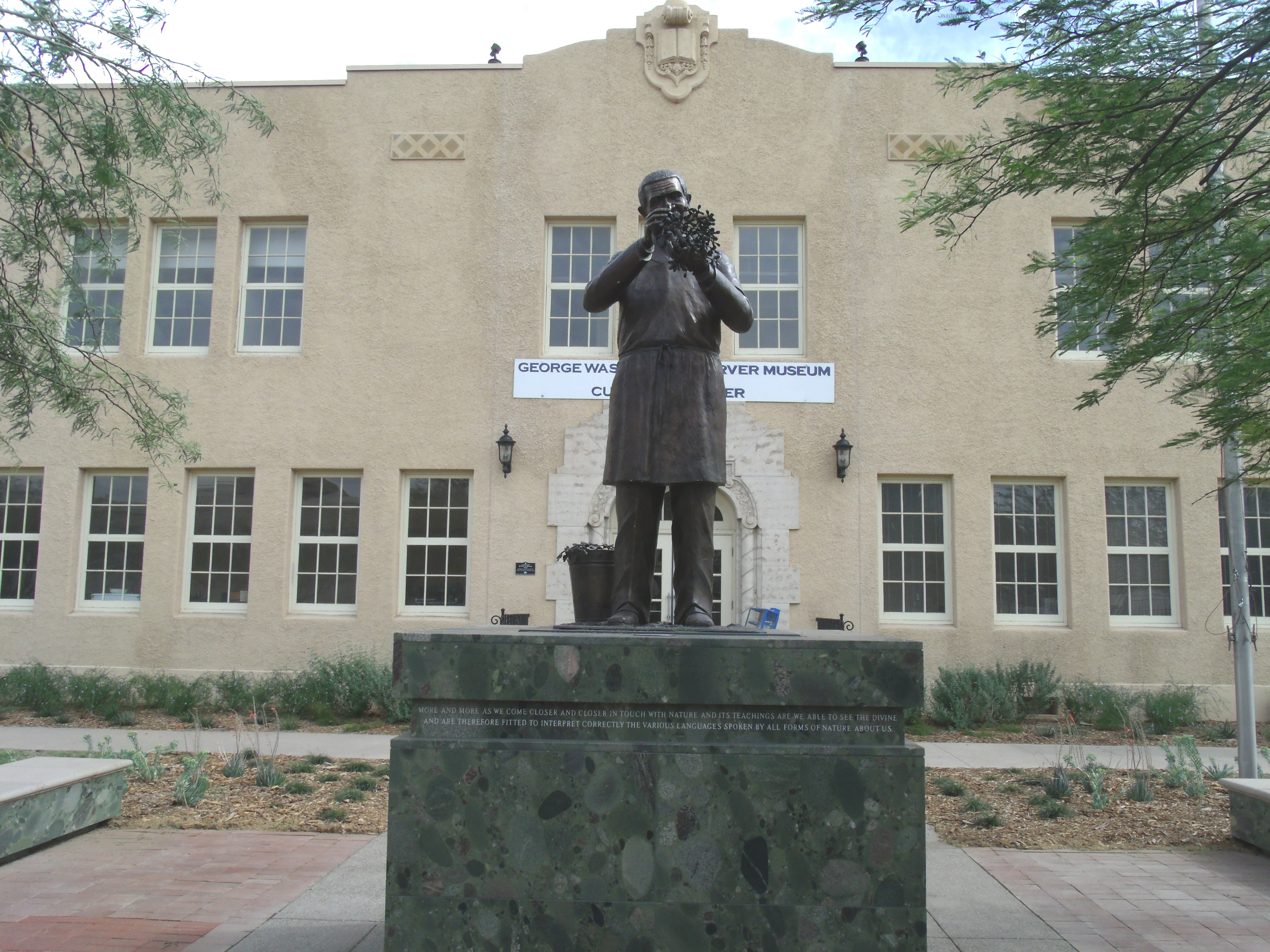
Phoenix Union Colored High School (Later renamed George Washington Carver High School) was built in 1926 and is located at 415 E. Grant St. It was listed in the National Register of Historic Places on May 2, 1991, ref. #91000543.

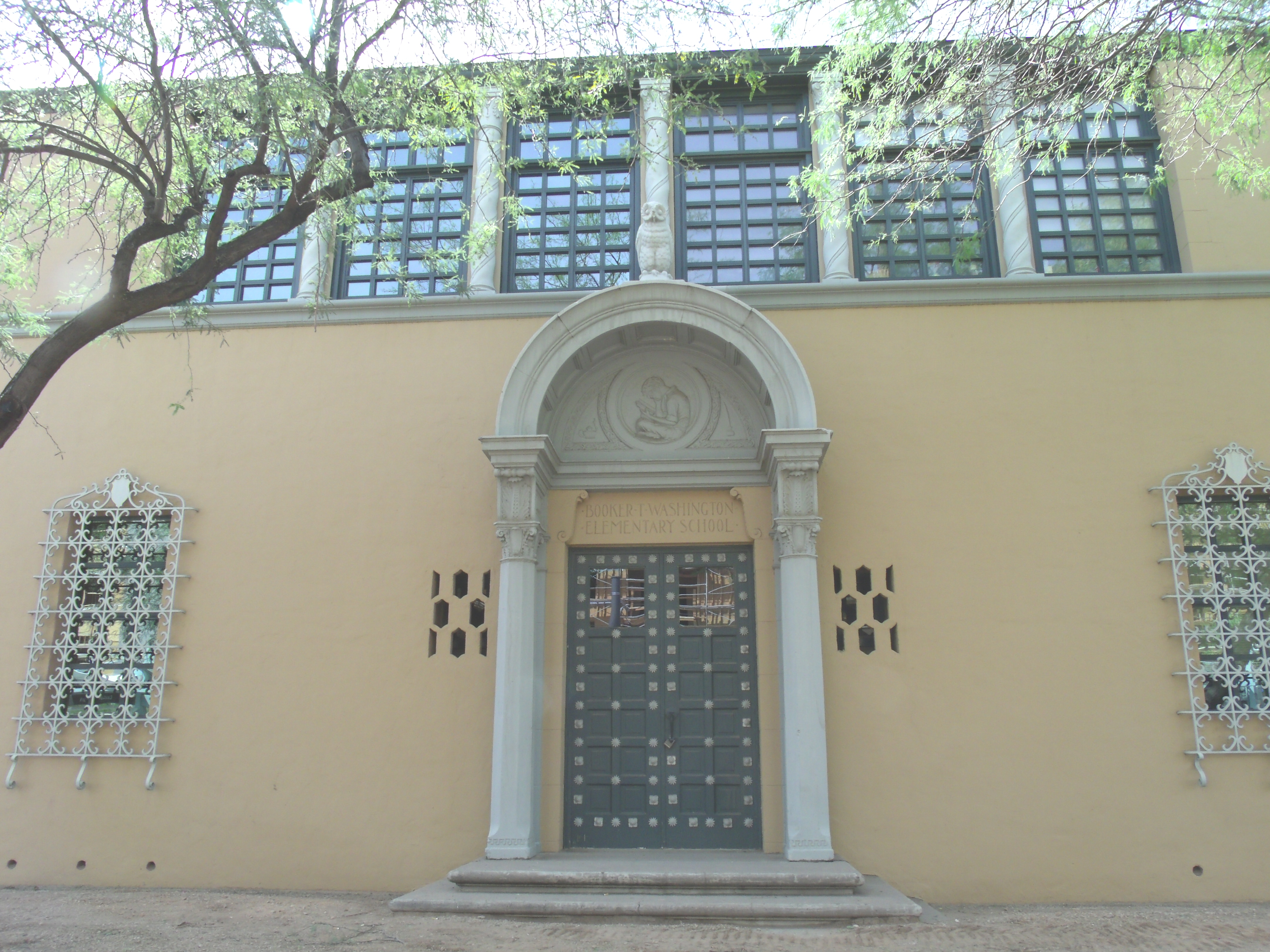
The Booker T. Washington Elementary School was built in 1928 and is located at 1201 E. Jefferson St. The school was the first all African-American elementary school in Phoenix. It now houses the "Sun Times" of Phoenix. It is listed in the Phoenix Historic Property Register.

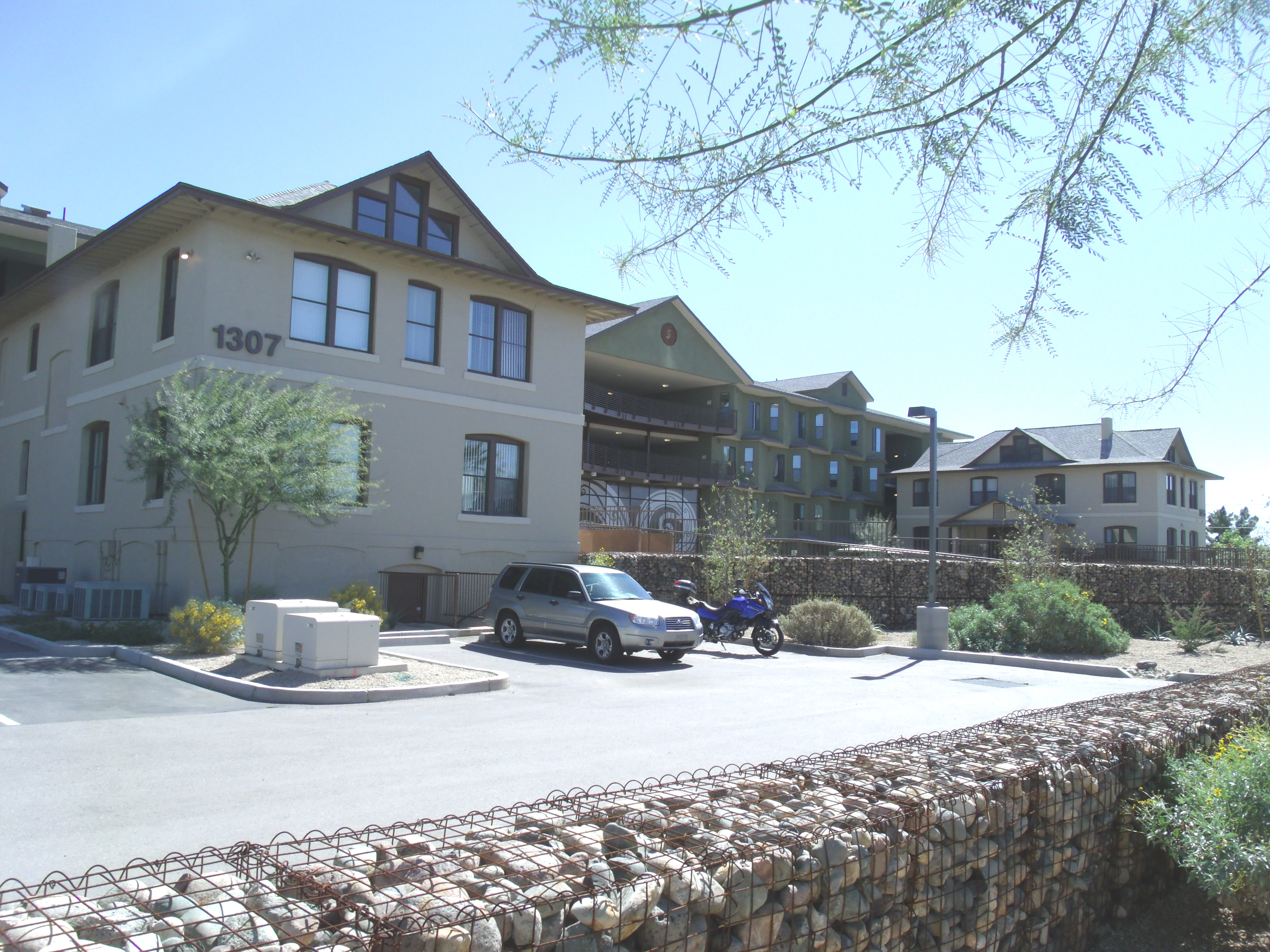
The Arizona Academy North and South Halls were built in 1928 and are located at 1325 N. 14th Street. The former academy is now known as the Stepping Stone Place. The North Hall is addressed as 1307 and the South Hall as 1305. Both towers were listed in the National Register of Historic Places in 1993, ref.: #93000813.

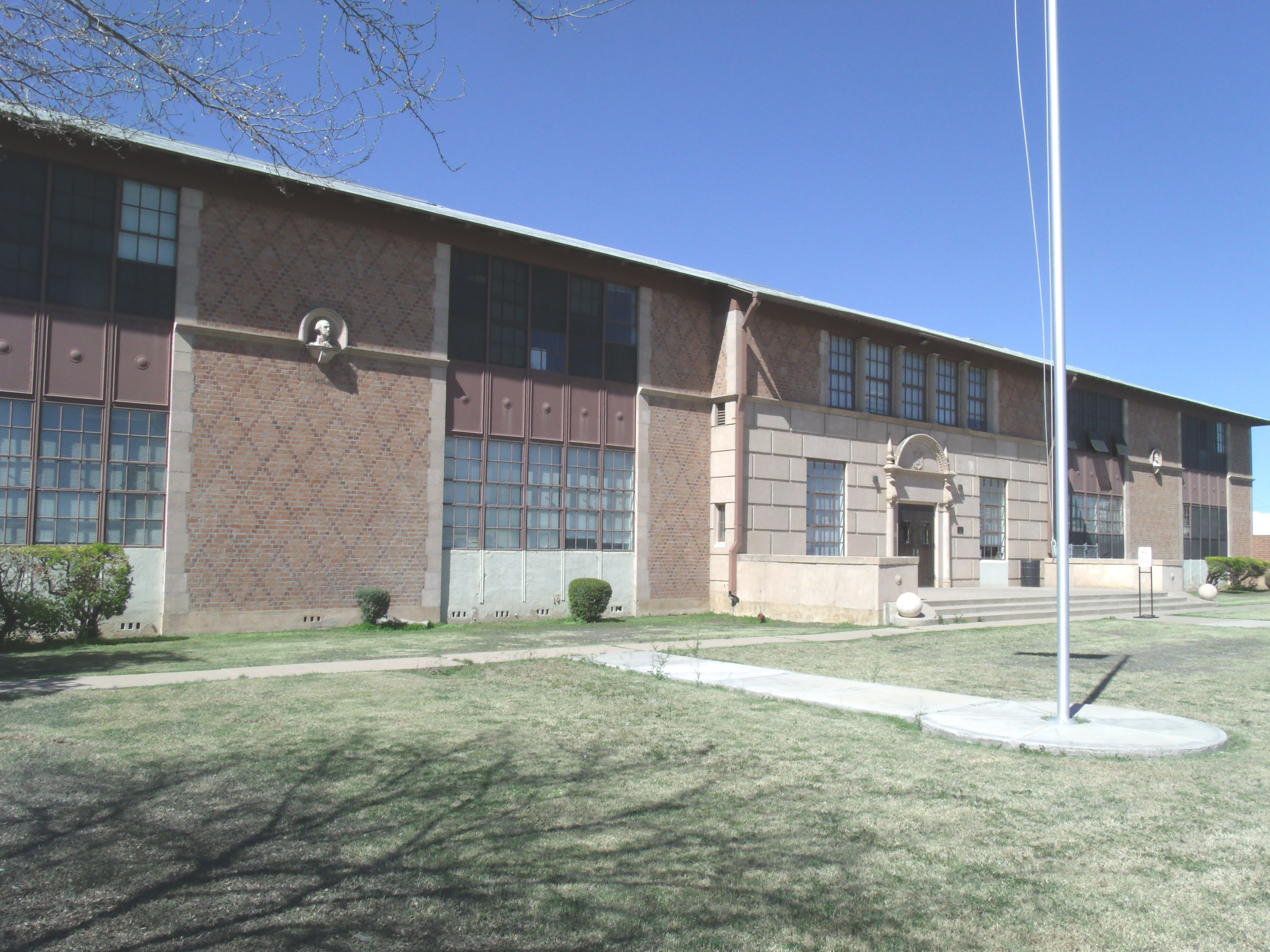
The John G. Whittier School was built in 1929 and is located at 2004 N. 16th Street. On August 12, 1993, it was listed in the National Register of Historic Places, ref.: #93000741.

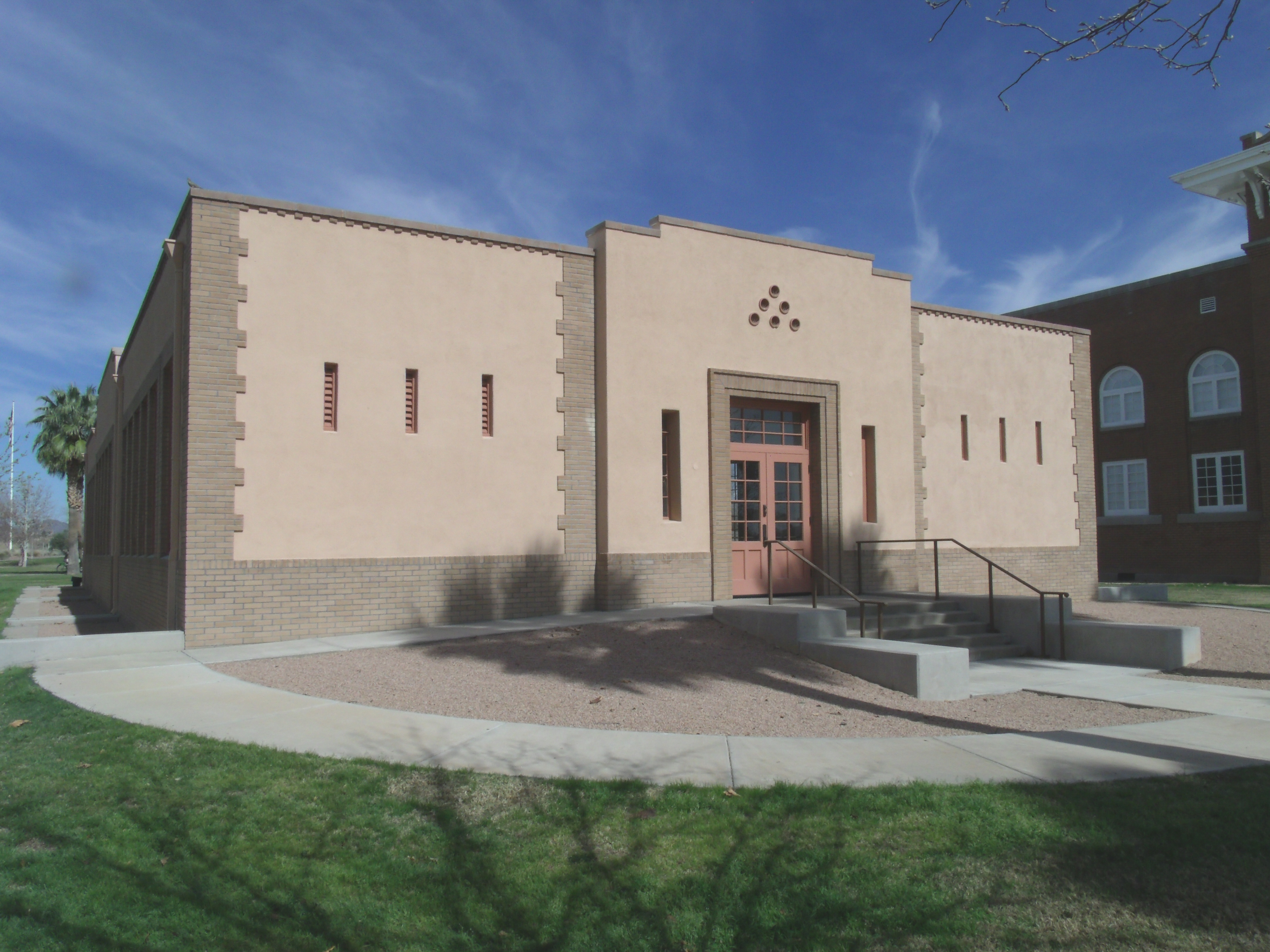
The Indian School Band Building built in 1931 and located in the compounds of Phoenix's Steele Park in 300 E. Indian School Rd. It was listed in the National Register of Historic Places on May 31, 2001, ref. #01000521.

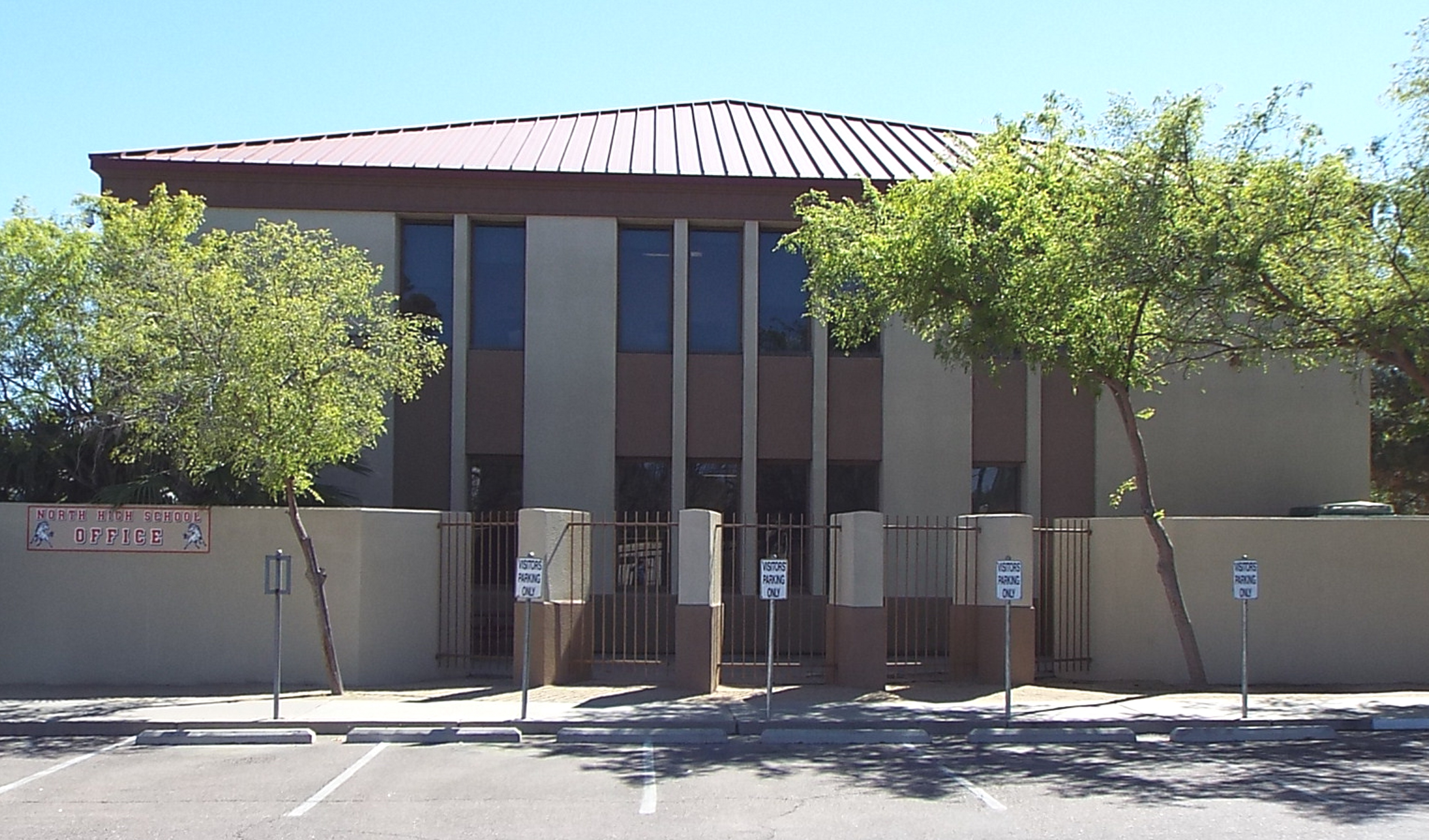
North Phoenix High School, now North High School (1954), was built in 1939 and is located on 1101 East Thomas Road. This is the original building which was planned and financed through the New Deal Works Projects Administration and Public Administration funds.

=== 19th century historic houses ===
Some of these houses meet the National Register criteria for evaluation. The quality of significance in American history, architecture, archeology, engineering, and culture is present in districts, sites, buildings, structures, and objects that possess integrity of location, design, setting, materials, workmanship, feeling, and association and that are associated with the lives of persons significant in Phoenix's past. The following prominent people who at one time or another lived in Phoenix and whose houses are listed here are:

- Clinton Campbell, a locally prominent builder who worked in Phoenix. His house however, was demolished in 2017.
- Phillip "Lord" Darrell Duppa. Duppa is credited with naming "Phoenix" and "Tempe" and the founding of the town of New River.
- Burgess A. Hadsell, Hadsell, together with William J. Murphy, promoted the temperance colony of Glendale, Arizona in the western Salt River Valley.
- William John Murphy. Murphy created the Arizona Improvement Company in 1887 and bought land in areas that would eventually become the towns of Peoria and Glendale of Arizona.
- William R. Norton. Norton founded the Sunnyslope subdivision of Phoenix and designed the Carnegie Library, the city's first library, and the Gila County Courthouse in Globe, Arizona.
- William Osborn, one of Phoenix's first homesteaders.
- Judge Charles A. Tweed. Judge Tweed was appointed an Associate Justice to the Arizona Territorial Supreme Court. Tweed then moved to Arizona Territory and was appointed to serve two terms as an Associate Justice of the Arizona Territorial Supreme Court.
Historic houses built in the 19th century in Phoenix, Arizona
(NRHP = National Register of Historic Places)
(PHPR = Phoenix Historic Property Register)
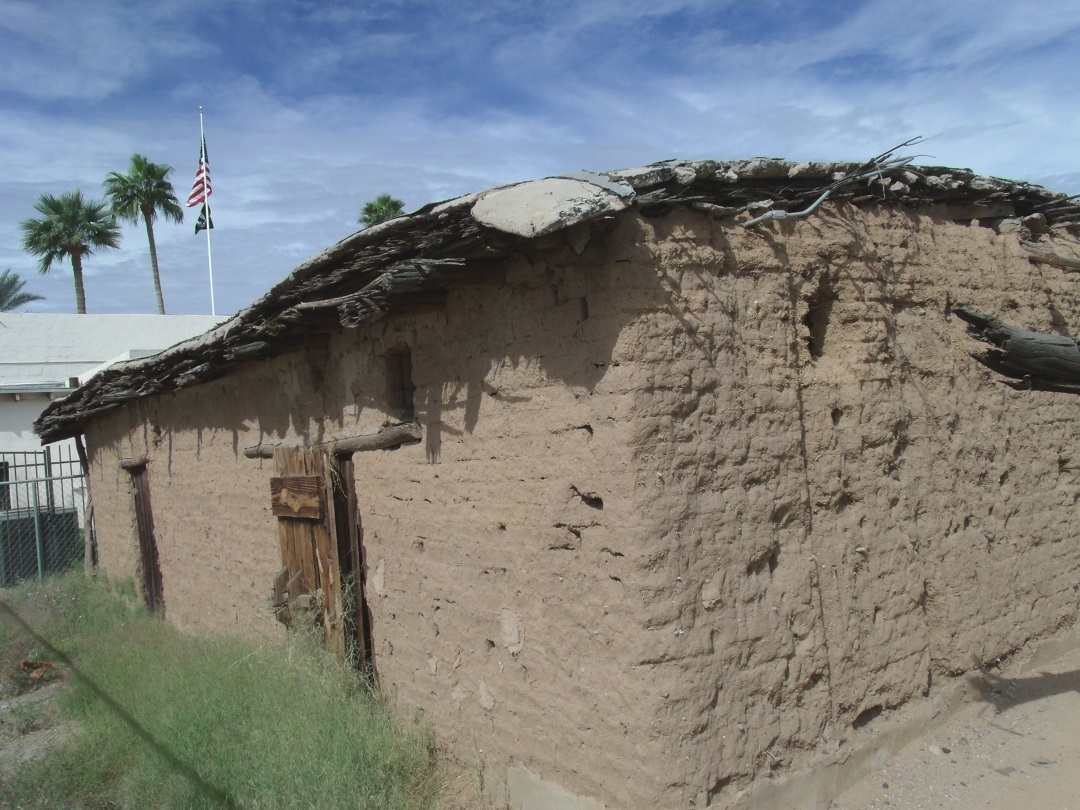
The Duppa-Montgomery Adobe House was built in 1870 and is located at 116 W. Sherman St. It is one of Phoenix's oldest houses.

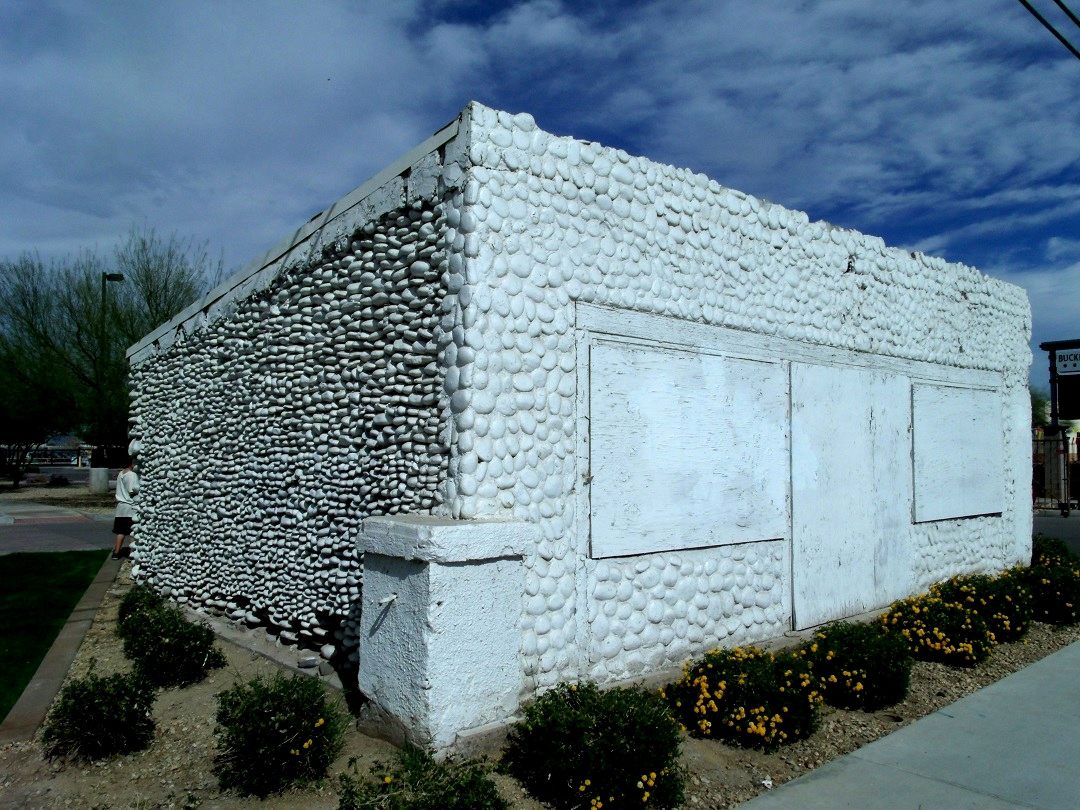
The Jones-Montoya House, located at 1008 E. Buckeye Road, was built in 1879 and is one of Phoenix's oldest houses. The house is listed as historic by the Phoenix Historic Property Register. This was the homestead house of "Lord" Darrell Duppa, an Englishman who is credited with naming "Phoenix" and "Tempe" and the founding of the town of New River. Duppa later sold the adobe house to John Britt Montgomery. Designated as a landmark with Historic Preservation-Landmark (HP-L) overlay zoning. The house is listed as historic by the Phoenix Historic Property Register.

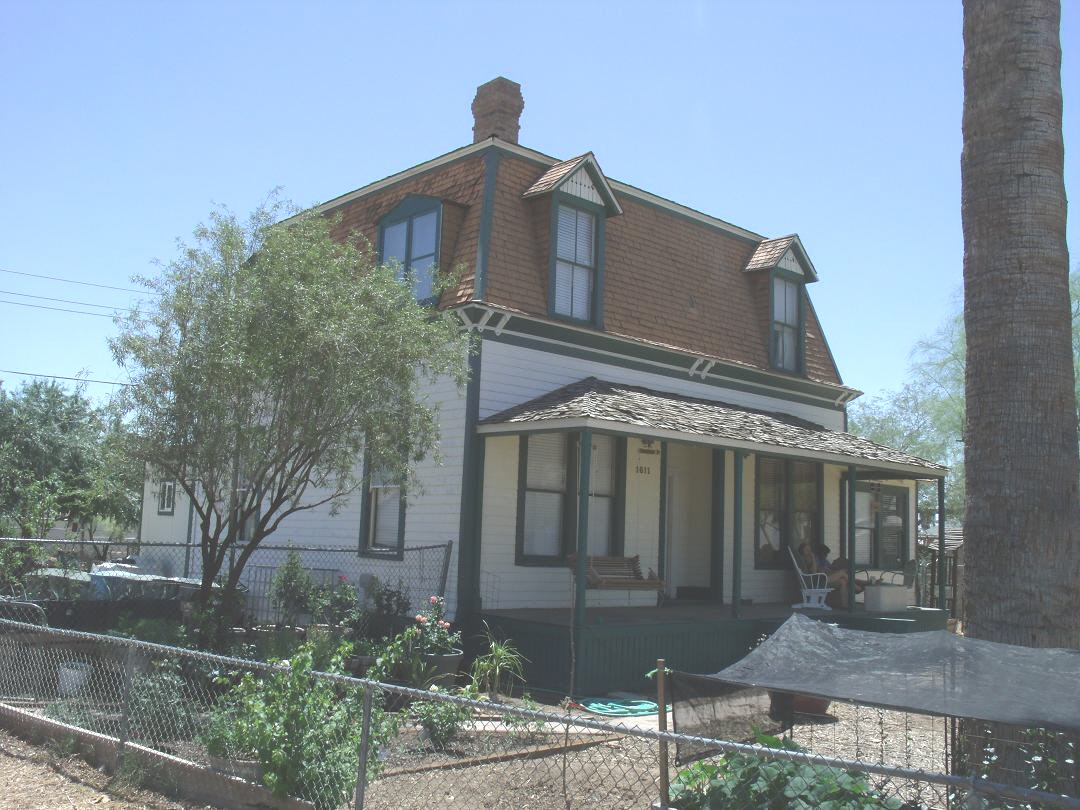
The Judge Charles A. Tweed House, built in 1880 and located at 1611 W. Filmore St. On April 14, 1870, Judge Tweed was appointed an Associate Justice to the Arizona Territorial Supreme Court. Tweed then moved to Arizona Territory and was appointed to serve two terms as an Associate Justice of the Arizona Territorial Supreme Court. The house is listed as historic by the Phoenix Historic Property Register.

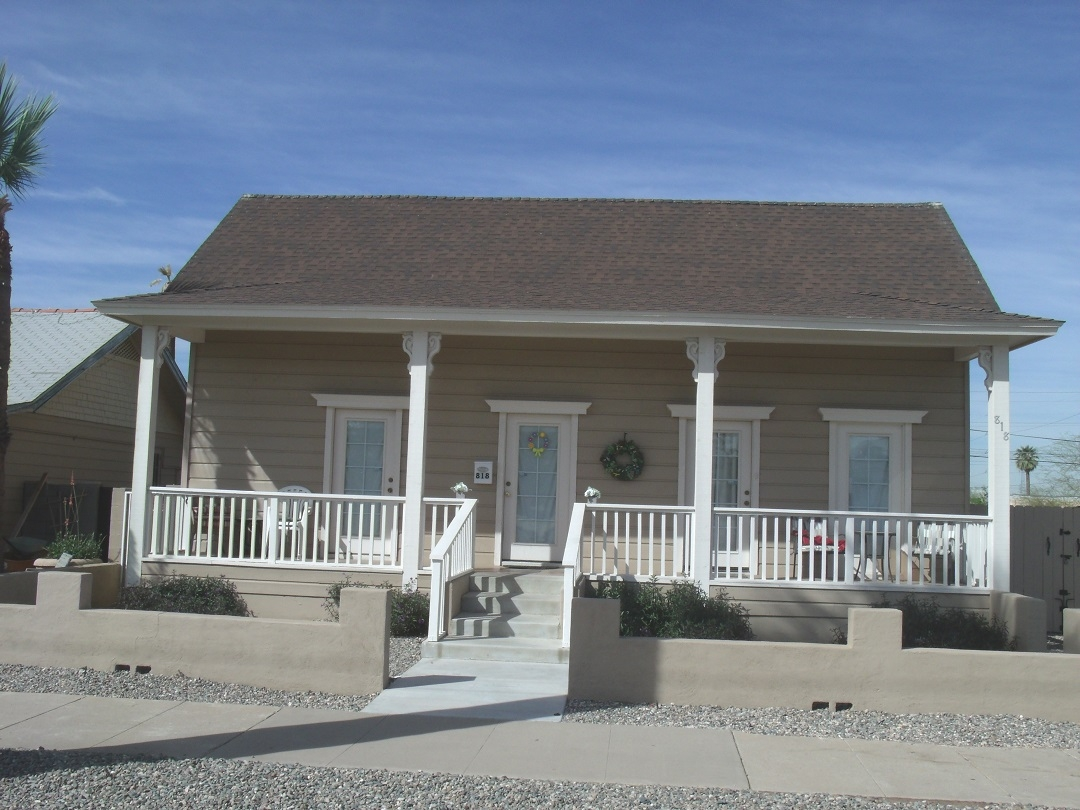
The House at 818 South 1st Avenue a.k.a. the Vernacular Residence was built in 1885 and is located at 818 S. First Avenue. It was listed in the National Register of Historic Places on January 12, 1995, as the "House at 818 South 1st Avenue", reference #94001538.

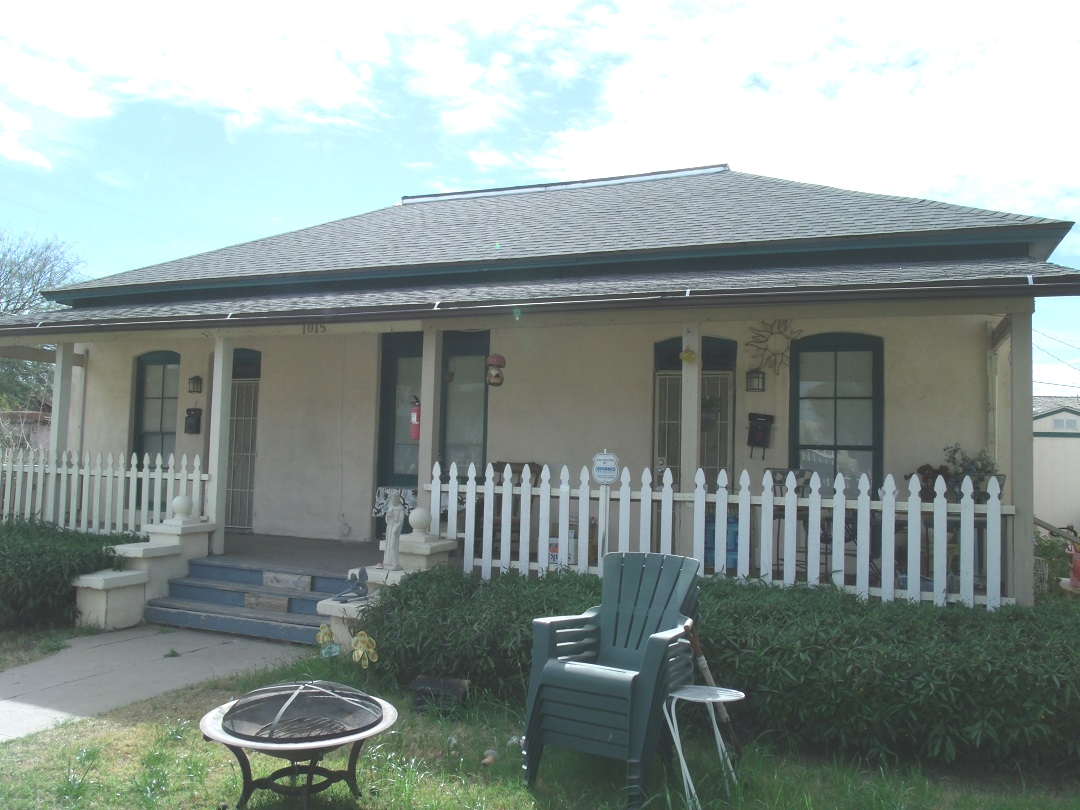
The Eyrich-Kohl House was built in 1885 and is located at 1015 Woodland Avenue. Eyrich was a German immigrant who moved to Arizona in 1875. According to the Phoenix Historical Society, Eyrich was a plumber who in the past had served as a cavalryman, "Indian fighter," prospector, miner, hotel and café employee and proprietor. Kohl, cattle rancher, lived in the house from 1917 to 1920. The house is listed in the National Register of Historic Places. Reference #94001530.

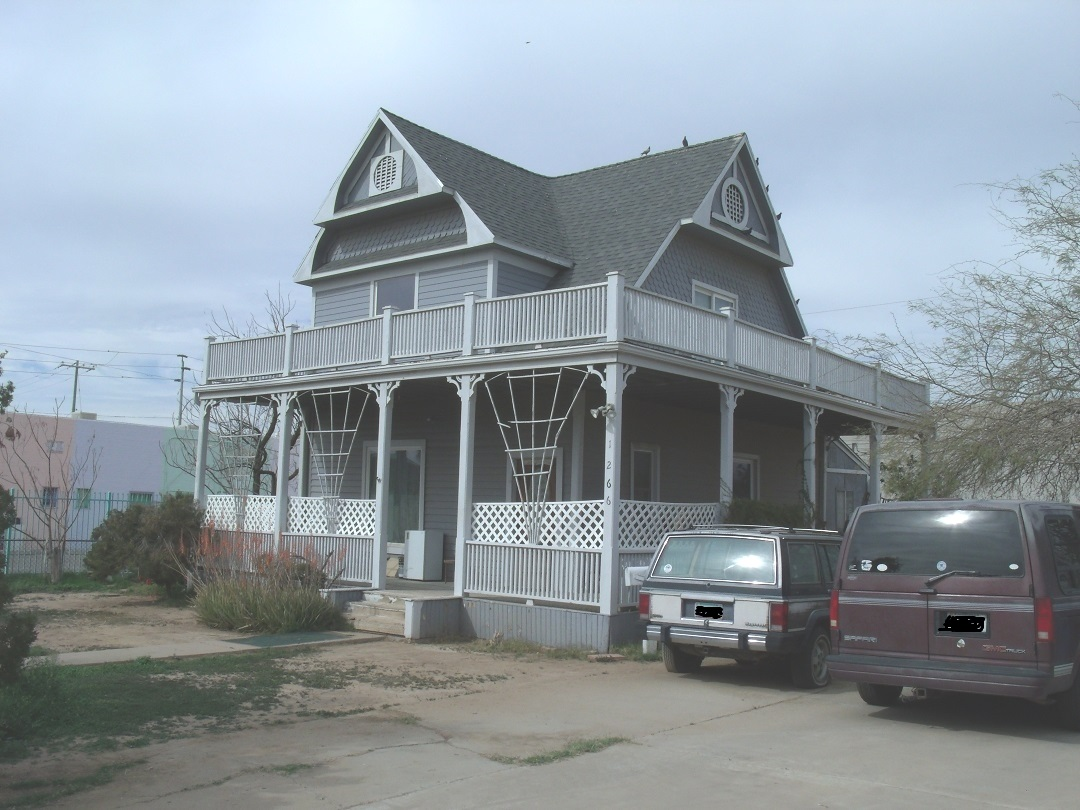
The William Lewis Osborn House, one of Phoenix's first homesteaders, was built in 1890. It is located at 1266 W. Pierce St. Listed in the National Register of Historic Places on May 15, 1991; Reference #91000544.

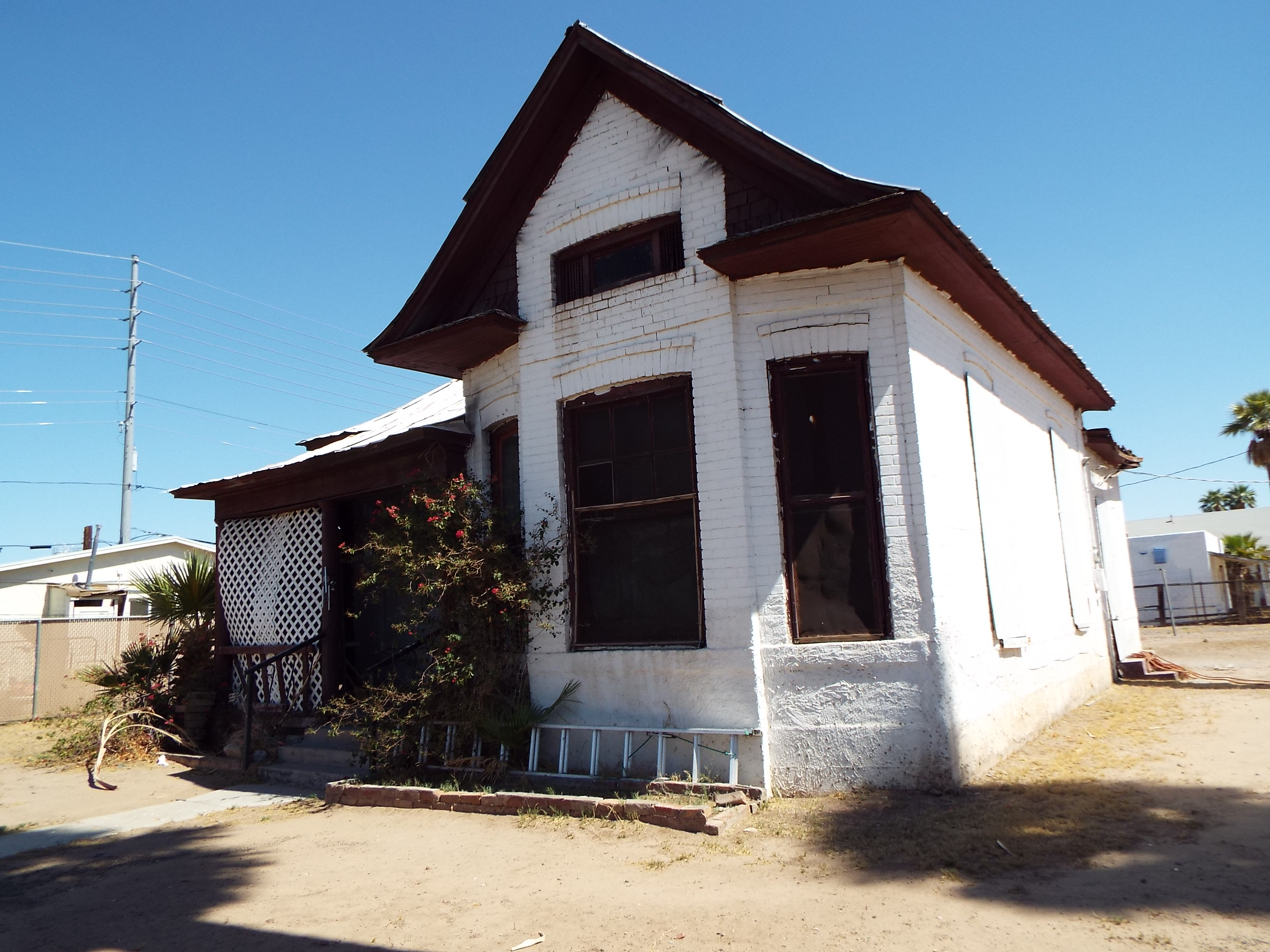
Abandoned Victorian House built in 1890 and located on East Grant St.

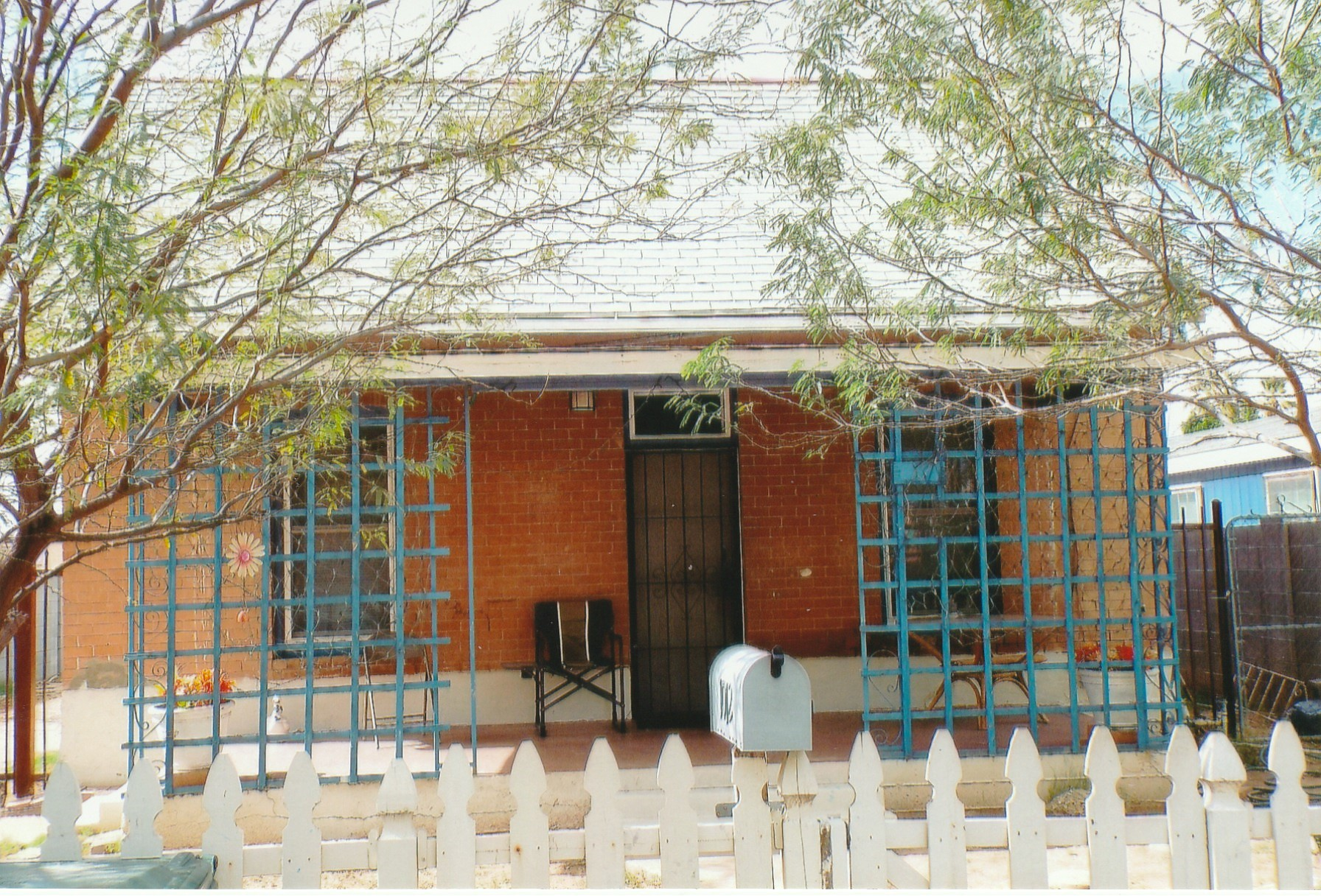
The M.J. Sharp House was built in 1890 and is located at 1012 S. 1st Avenue. It was listed in the National Register of historic Places on January 12, 1995, reference: #94001535.

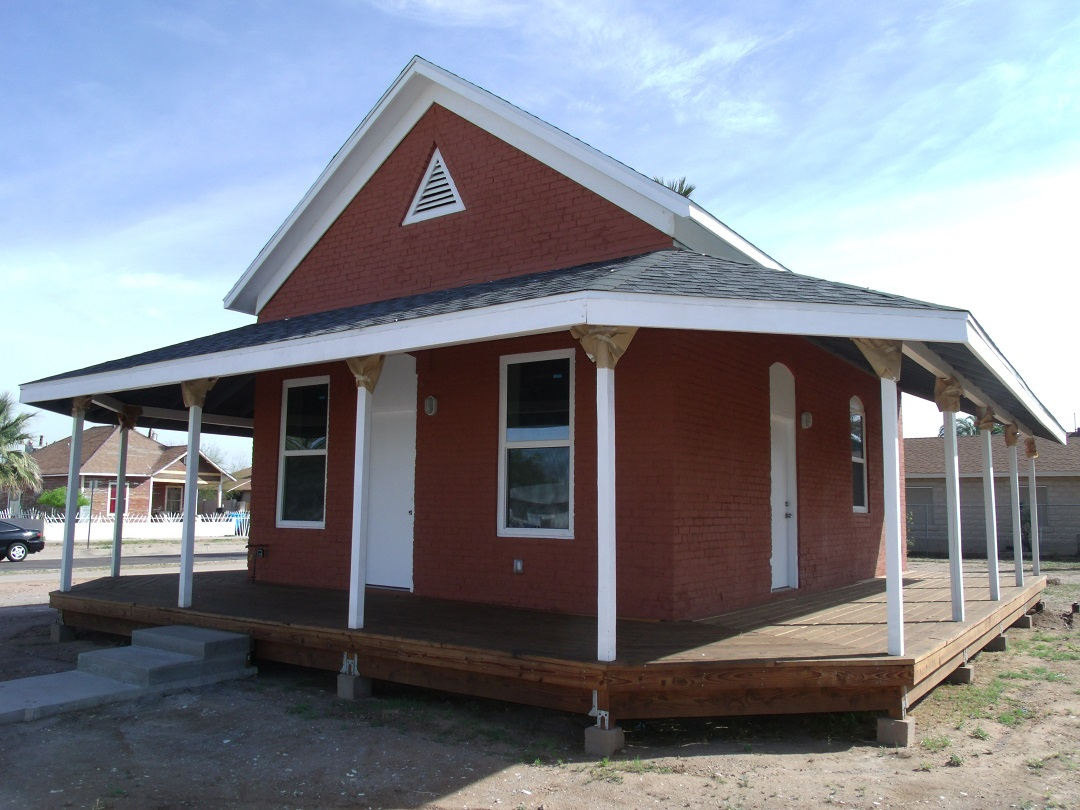
The Burgess A. Hadsell House was built in 1893 and is located at 1001 E. Fillmore St. Hadsell, together with William J. Murphy, promoted the temperance colony of Glendale, Arizona in the western Salt River Valley. The house was listed in the National Register of Historic Places on January 12, 1995, reference #94001531.

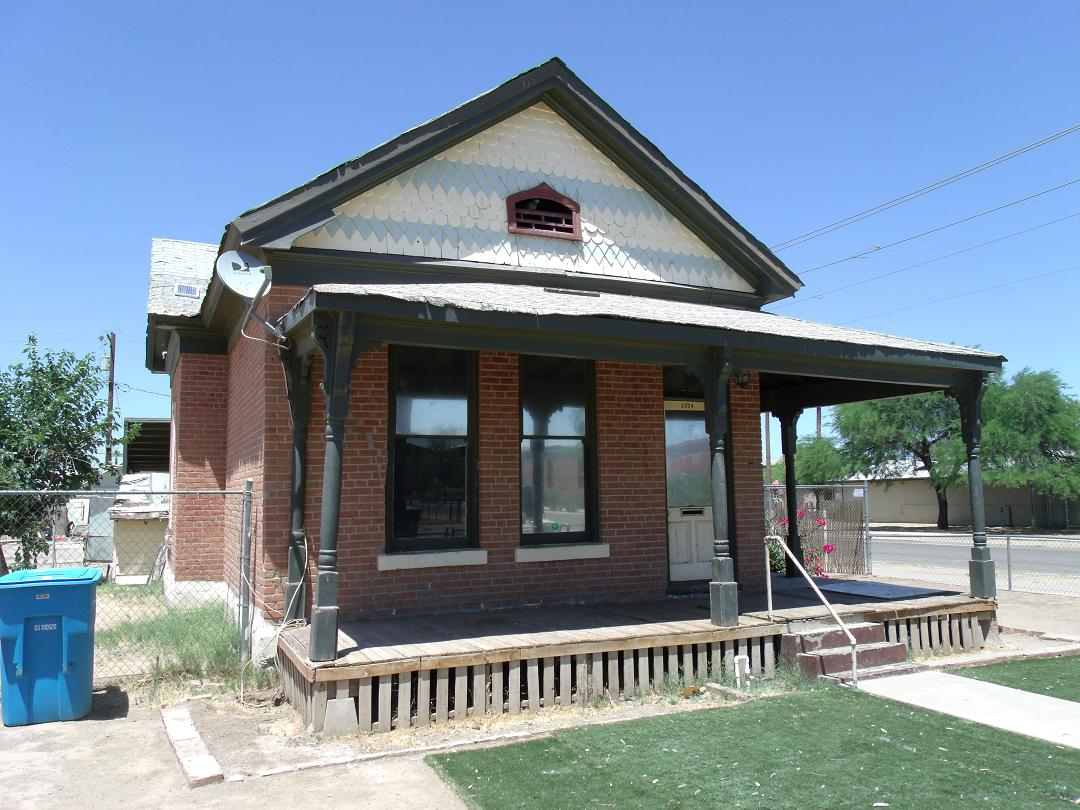
The Oscar Roberts Madison House was built in 1893 and is located at 2004 W. Madison St. The house is listed as historic by the Phoenix Historic Property Register

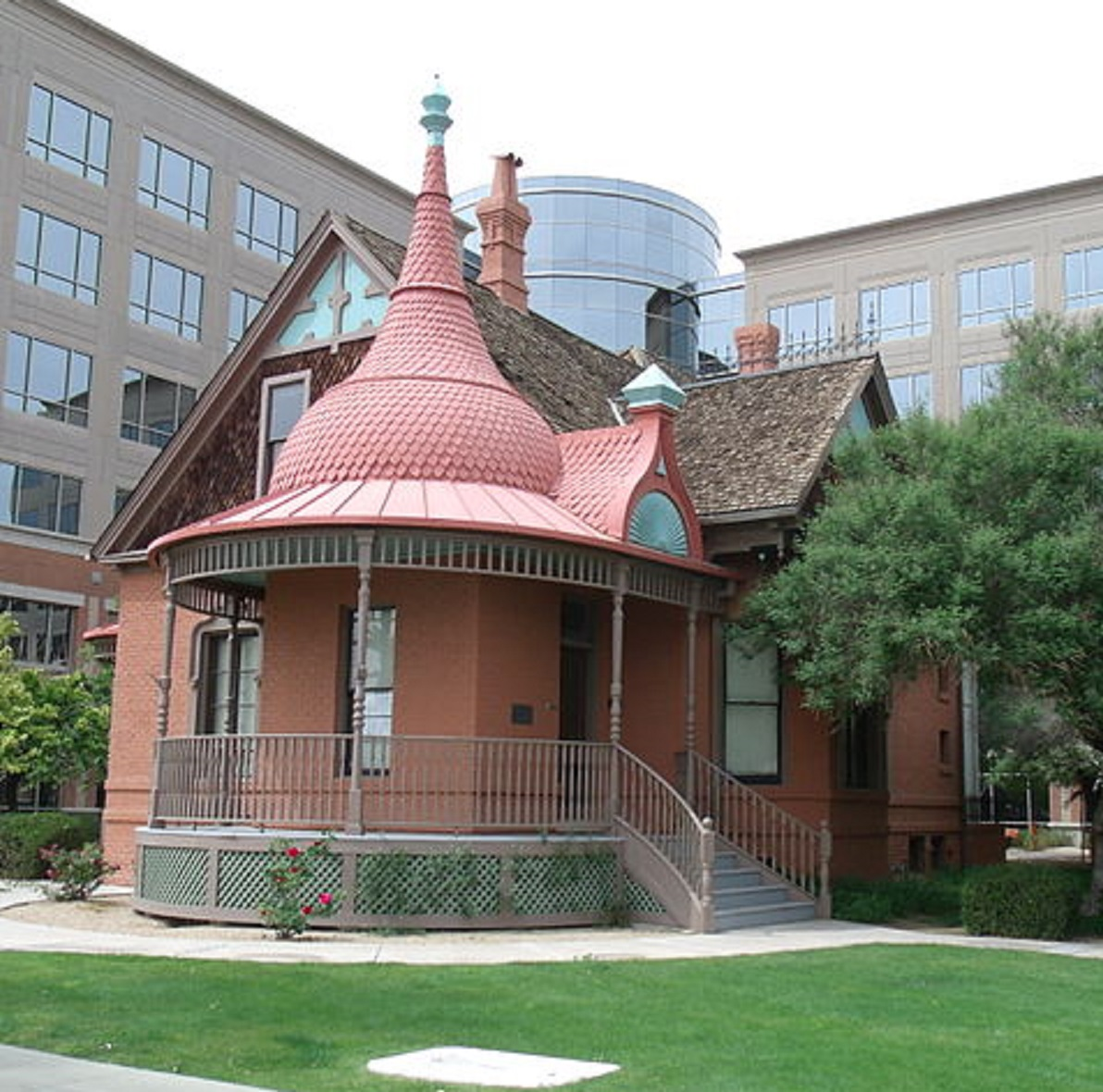
The Dr. Evans' House was built in 1893 and is located at 1100 W. Washington Street. The house belonged to Dr. John M. Evans who used it as both a residence and medical office. It was listed in the National Register of Historic Places on September 1, 1976, reference #76000375 (NRHP).

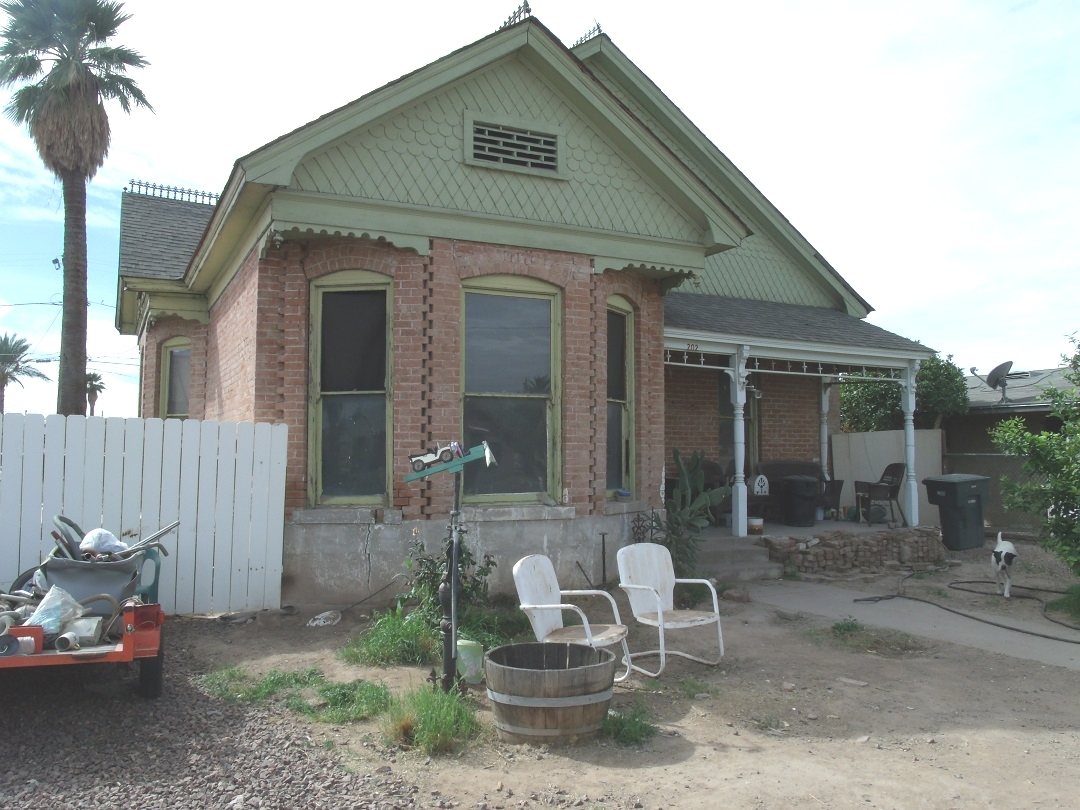
The C. P. Cronin House was built in 1893 and is located at 2029 W. Jefferson St. Designated as a landmark with Historic Preservation-Landmark (HP-L) overlay zoning. The house is listed as historic by the Phoenix Historic Property Register.

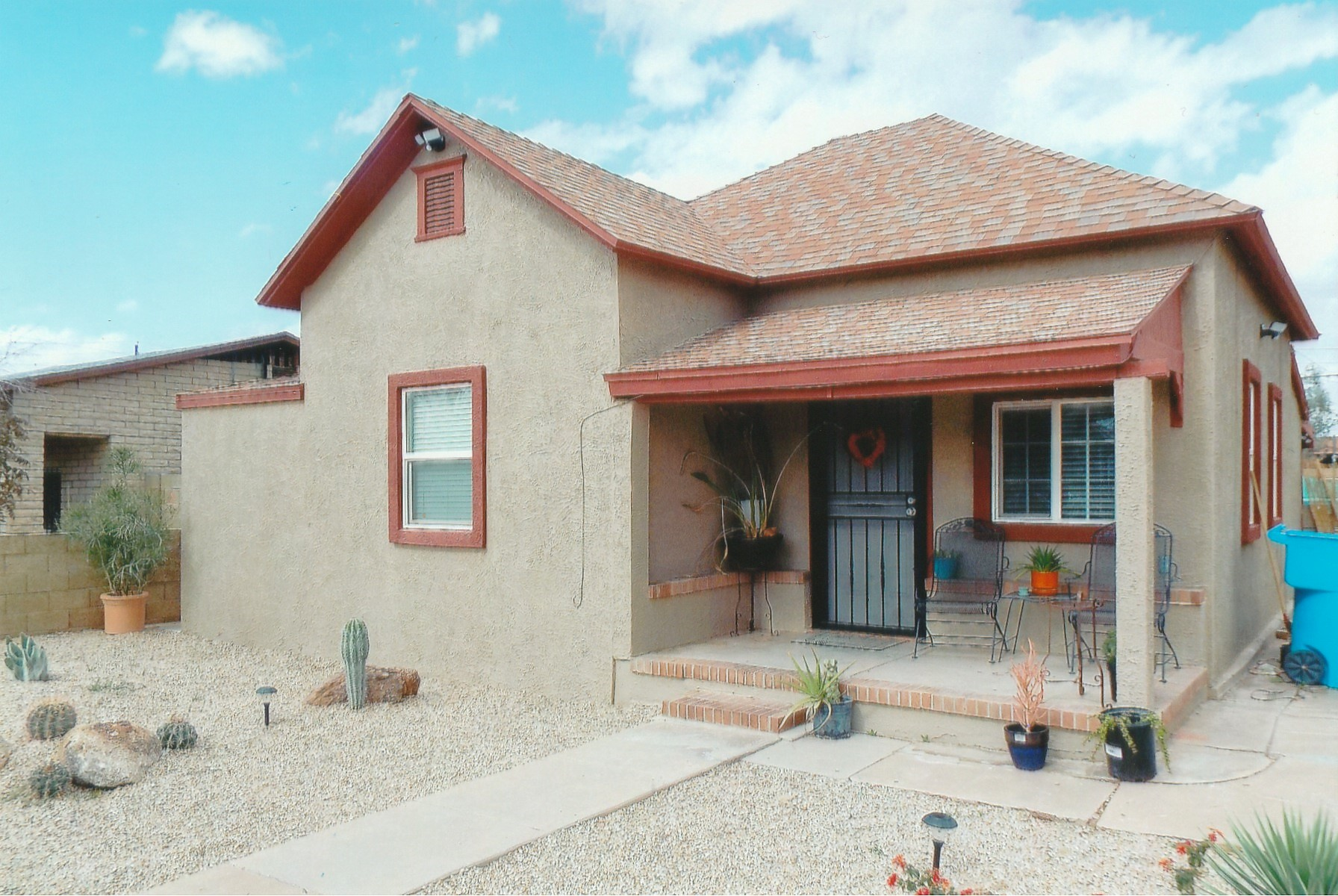
The Eder-Moffitt House was built in 1894 and is located at 1336 Taylor St. Listed in the National Register of Historic Places. Reference #94001605.

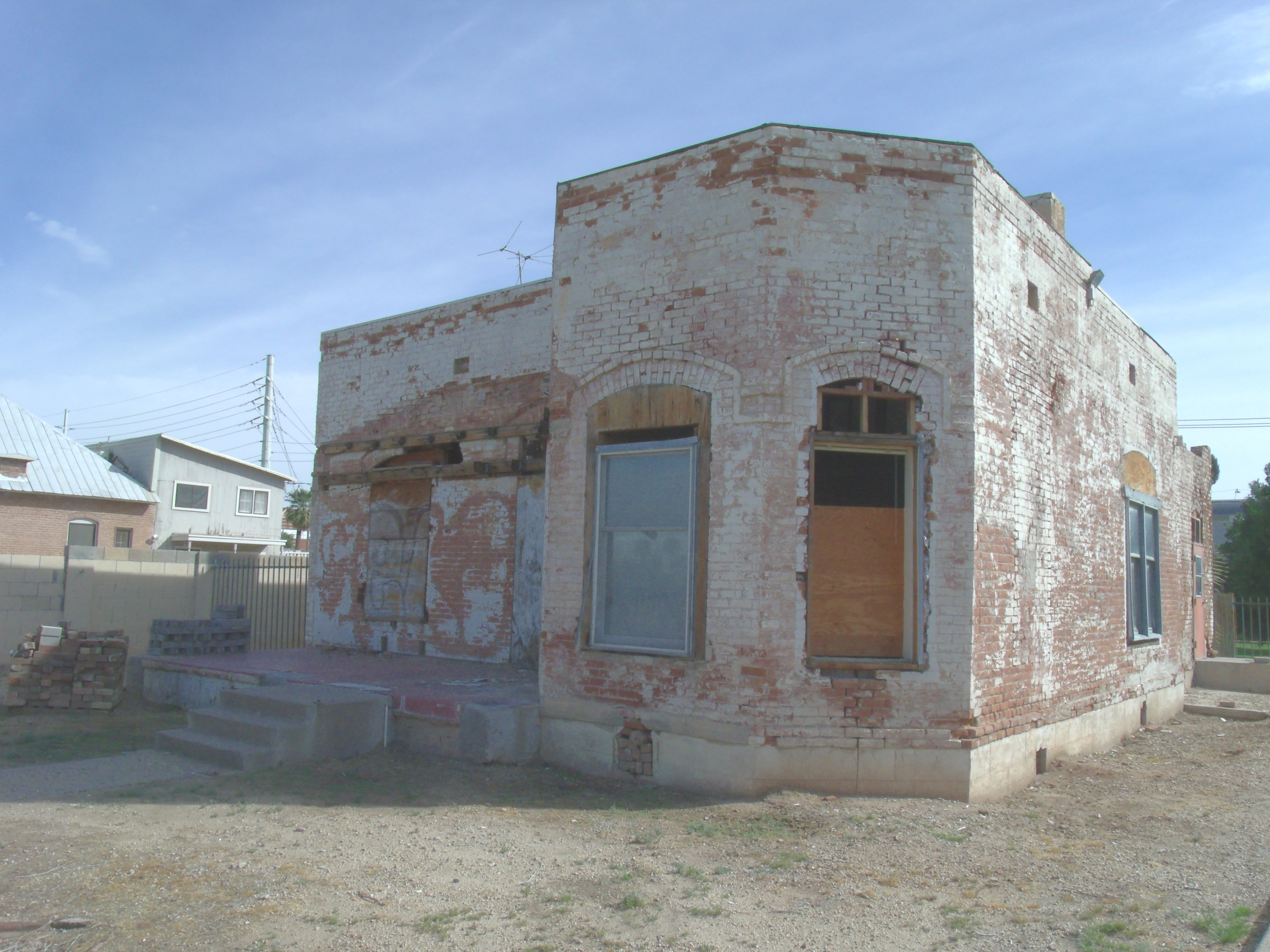
The Clinton Campbell House belonged to Clinton Campbell, a locally prominent builder in Phoenix. It was built in 1895 and was located at 361 N. 4th Avenue. The house was listed in the National Register of Historic Places on January 12, 1995, reference #94001526. The historic house was demolished on September 15, 2017, by its owners.

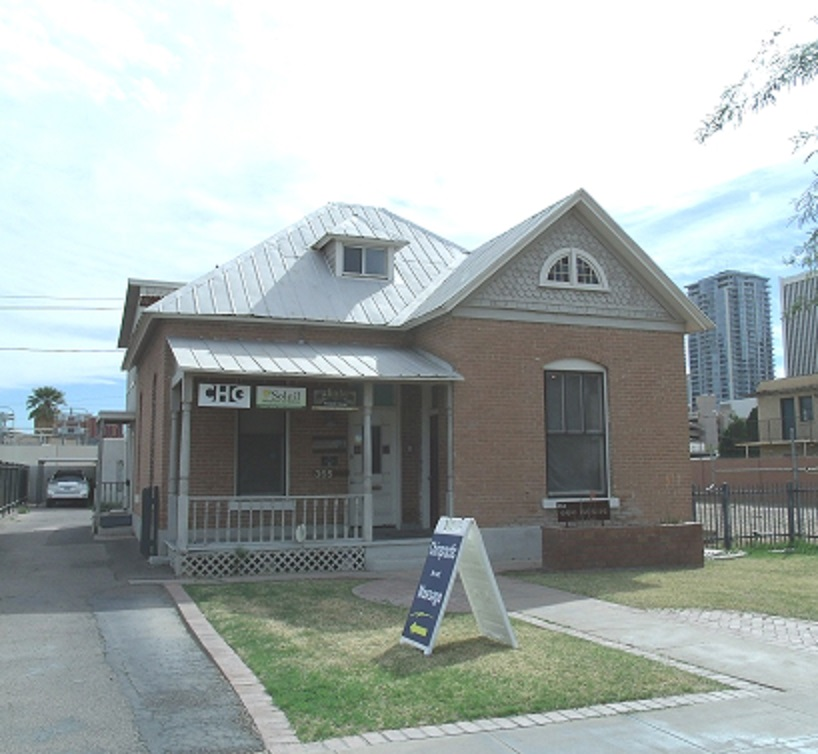
The H.M. Coe House was built in 1895 and is located at 365 N. 4th Avenue. Coe was a mechanic. He and his family occupied the house until after the turn of the century. The house is listed in the National Register of Historic Places. Reference #94001529.

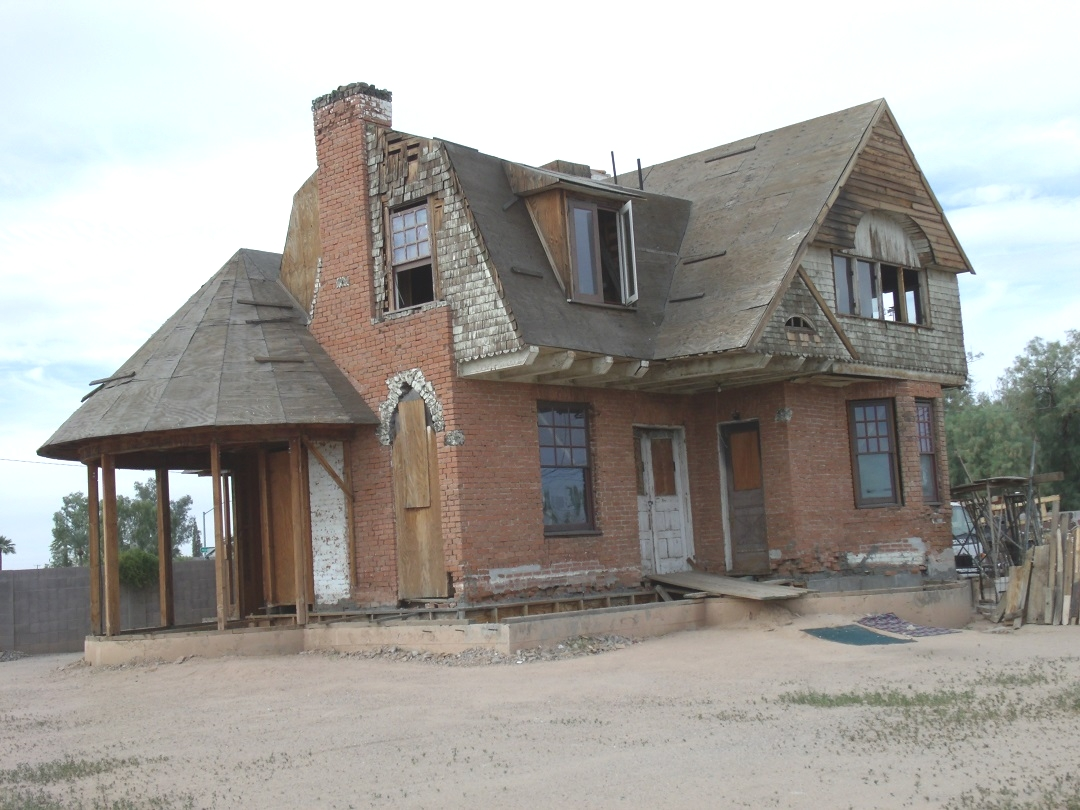
The William R. Norton House was built in 1895 and is located at 2222 W. Washington Street. Norton founded the Sunnyslope subdivision of Phoenix and designed the Carnegie Library, the city's first library, and the Gila County Courthouse in Globe, Az. The house is listed as historic by the Phoenix Historic Property Register.

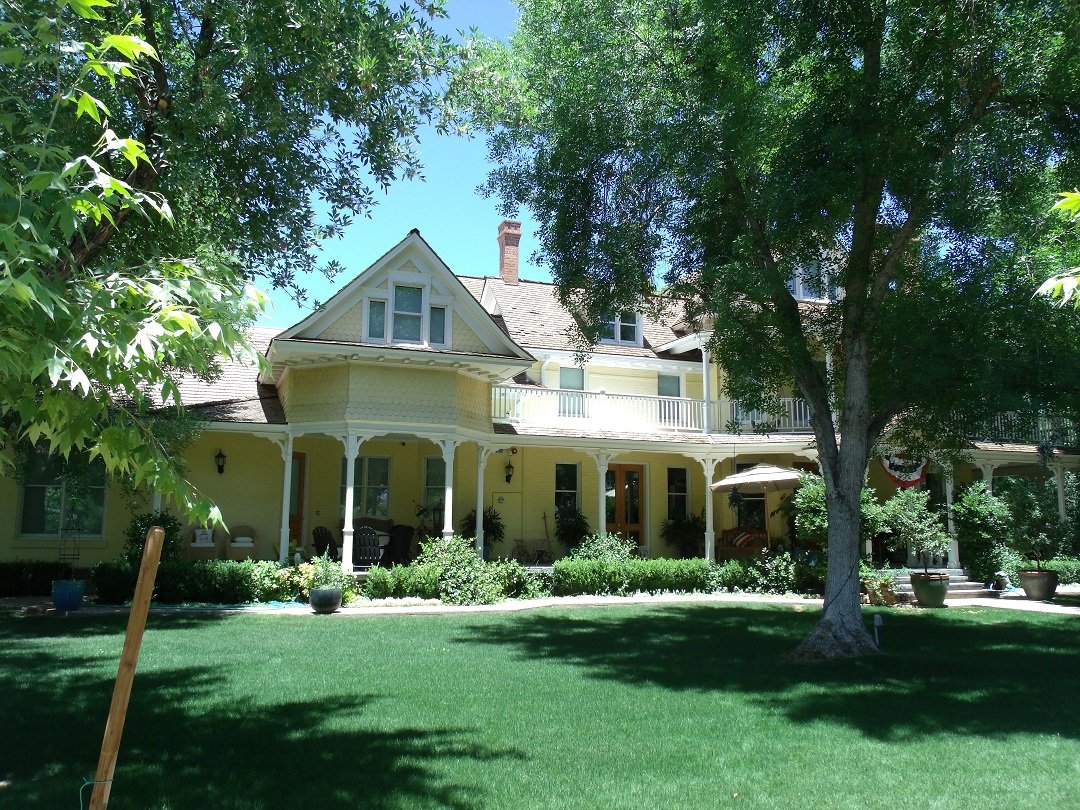
The William J. Murphy House was built in 1895 and is located at 7514 N. Central Avenue. William J. Murphy created the Arizona Improvement Company in 1887 and bought land in areas that would eventually become the towns of Peoria and Glendale. The house is listed as historic by the Phoenix Historic Property Register.

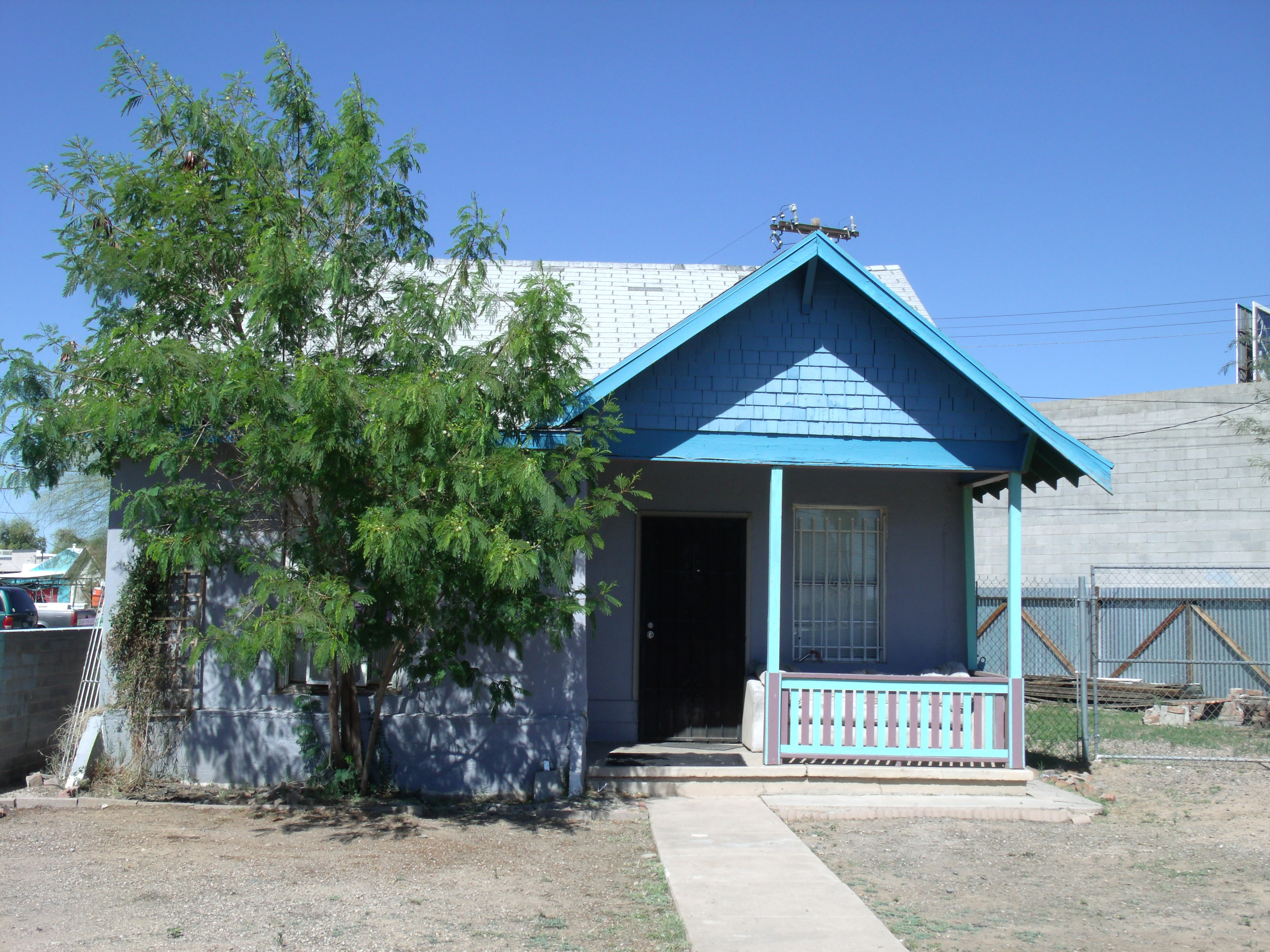
The Anderson-Joannes House was built in 1895 and is located 1027 N. 10th Avenue. It was listed in the National Register of Historic Places in 1995, ref.: #94001525.

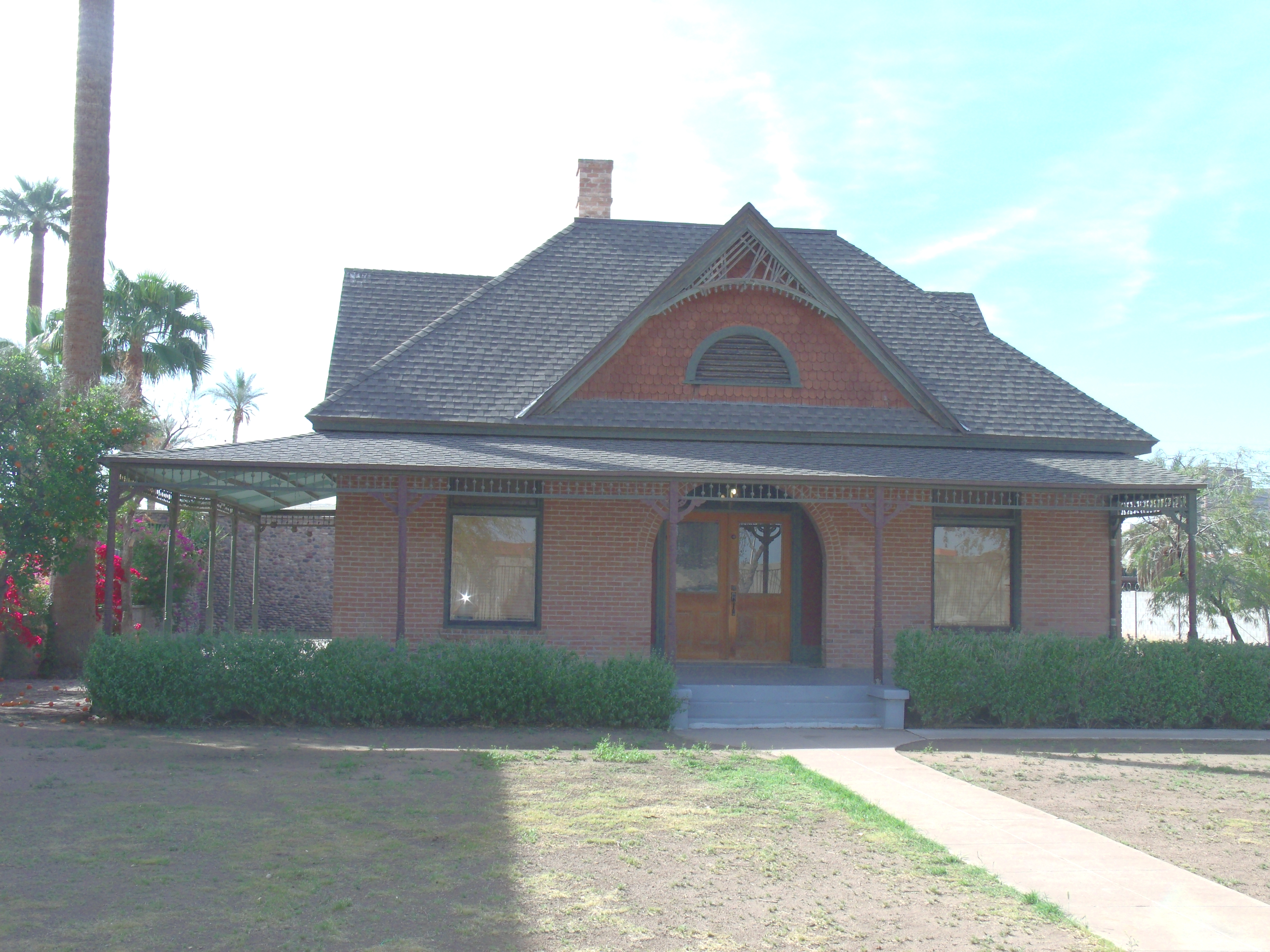
The George Hidden House was built in 1896 and is located at 763 E. Moreland St. It was listed in the National Register of Historic Places on January 11, 1995, reference #94001532.

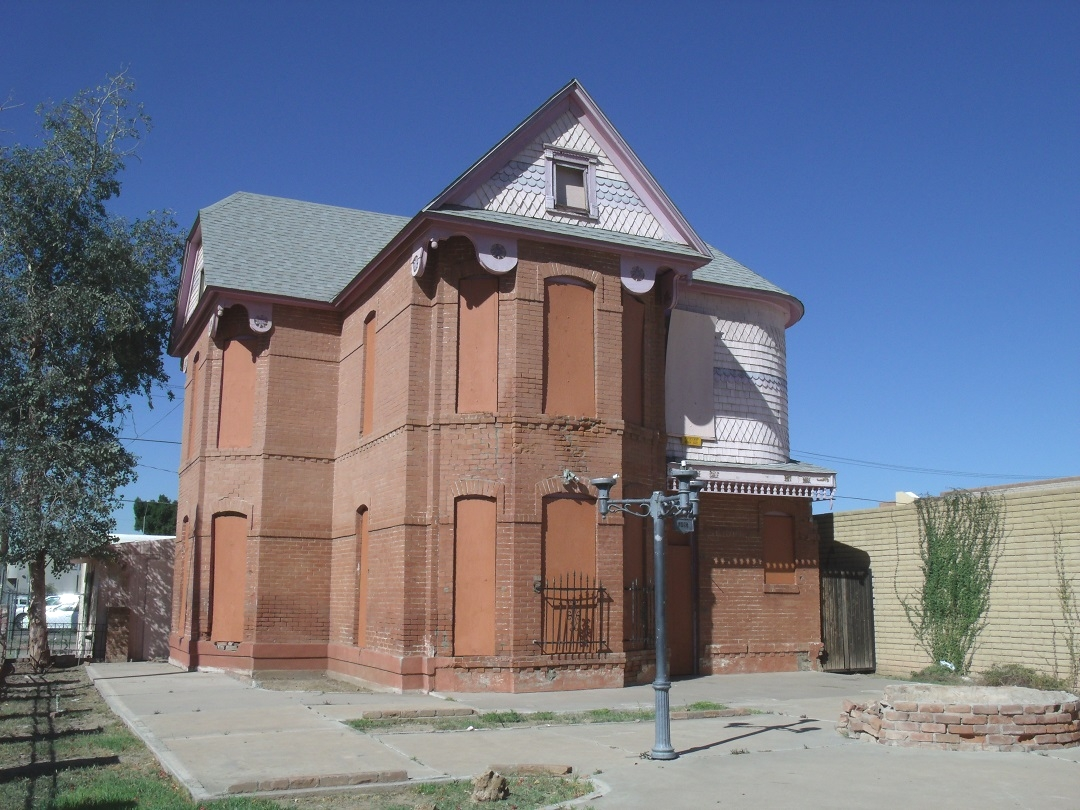
The Charles Pugh House was built in 1897 and is located at 356 N. 2nd Avenue. Designated as a landmark with Historic Preservation-Landmark (HP-L) overlay zoning. The house is listed as historic by the Phoenix Historic Property Register.

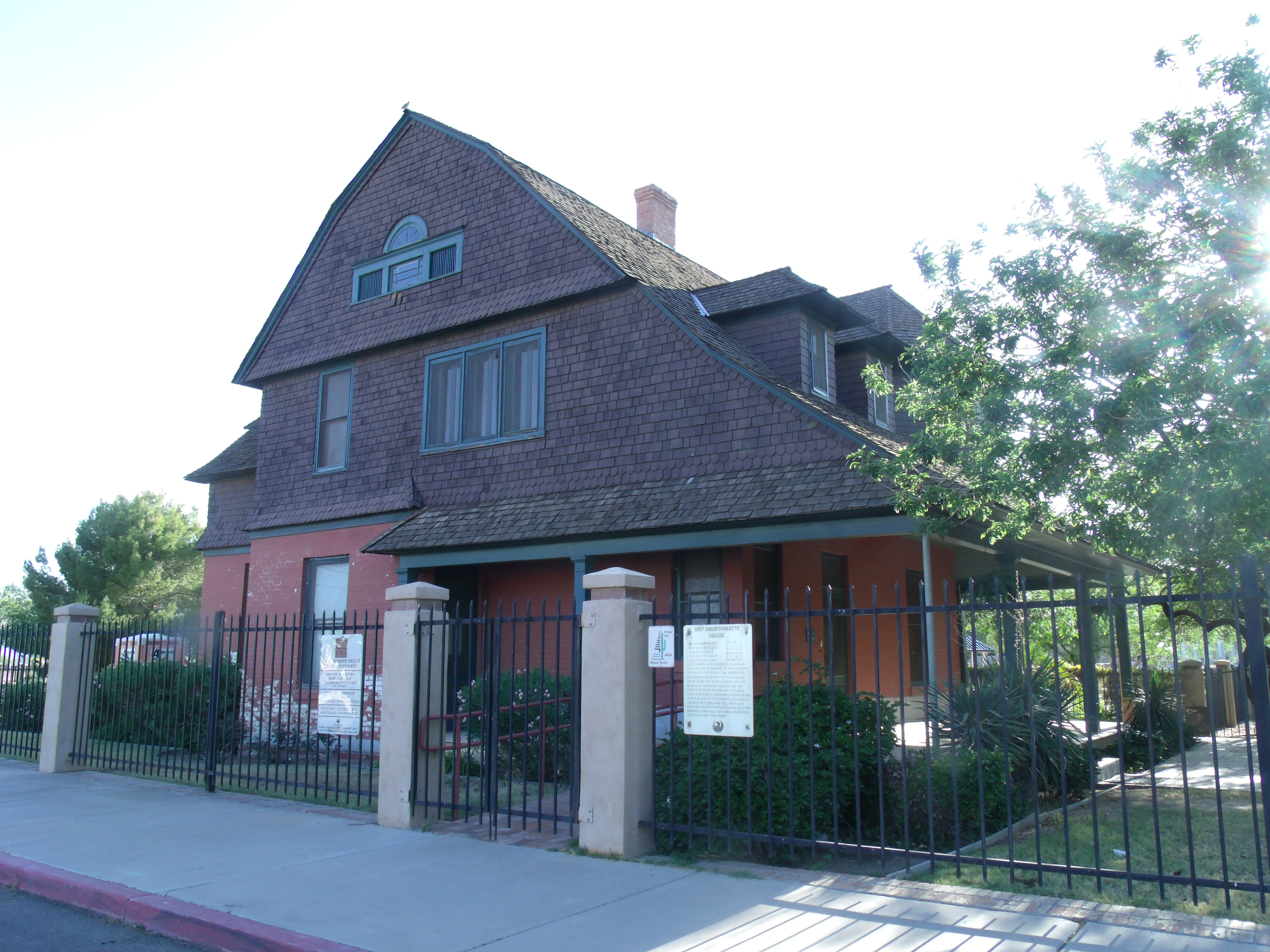
The Smurthwaite House was built in 1897 and is located 1317 W. Jefferson Street. The house currently serves as the office of the historic Pioneer and Military Cemetery. It was listed in the National Register of Historic Places on May 17, 2001, reference #01000479 (NRHP).

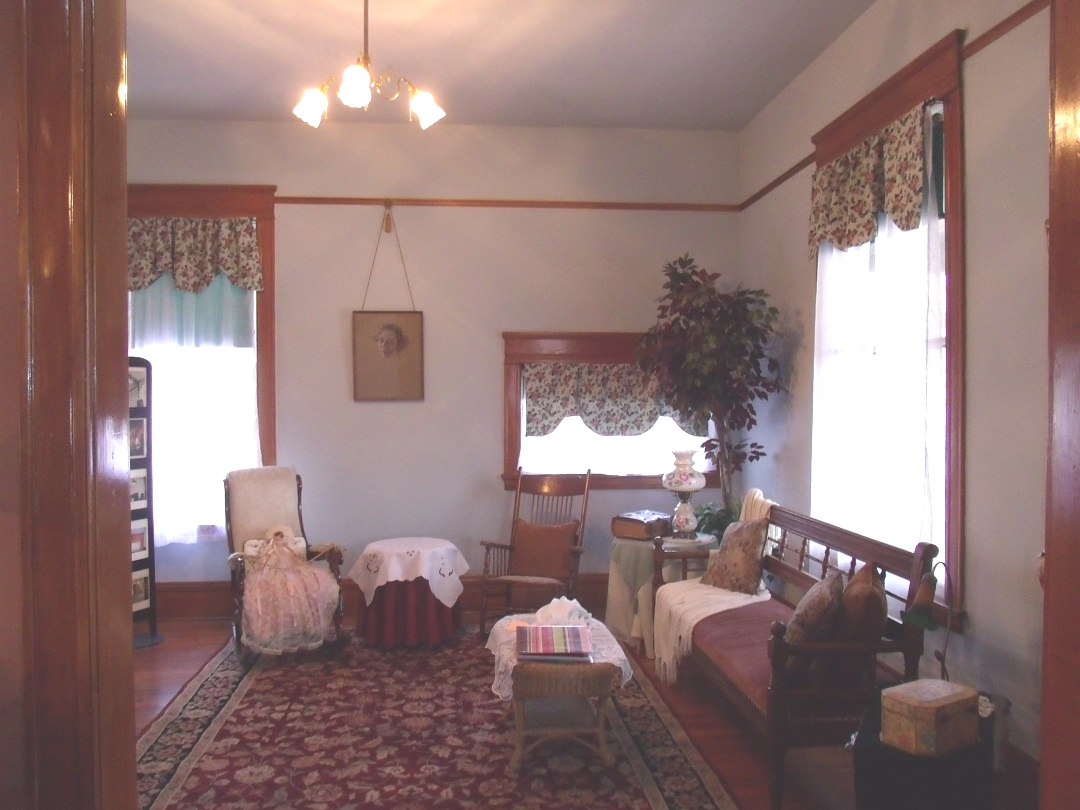
The living room of the Smurthwaite House, which was built in 1897.

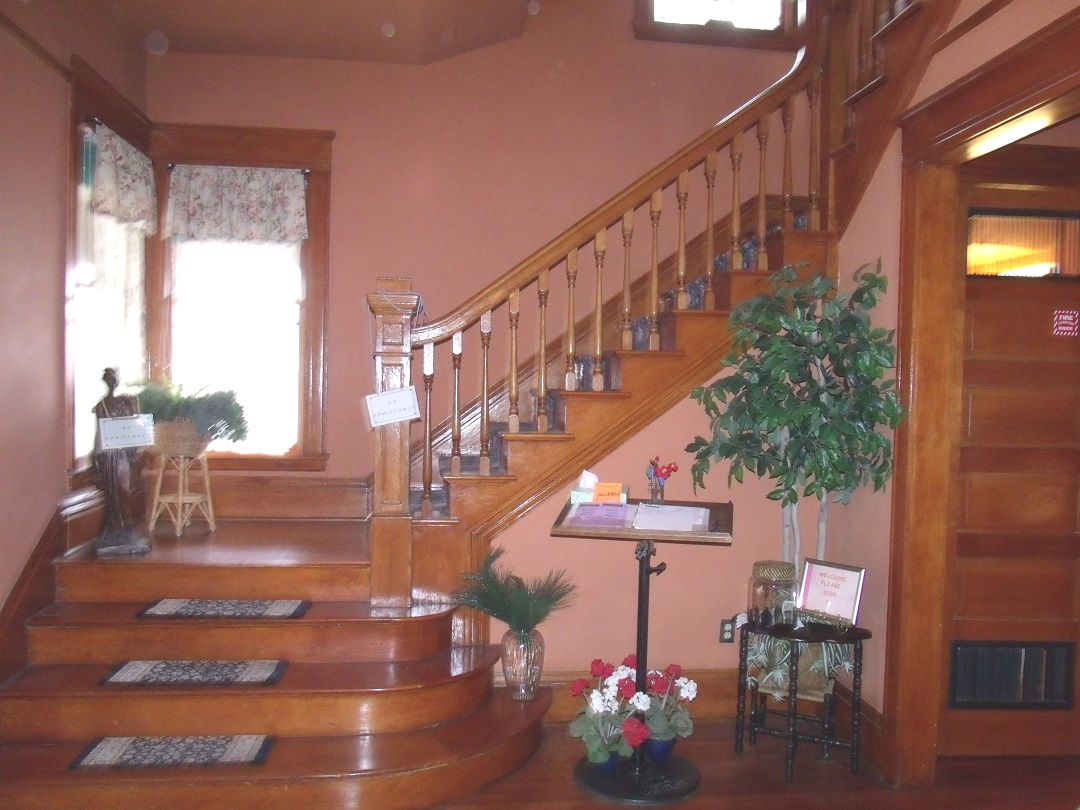
The staircase leading to the second floor of the Smurthwaite House.

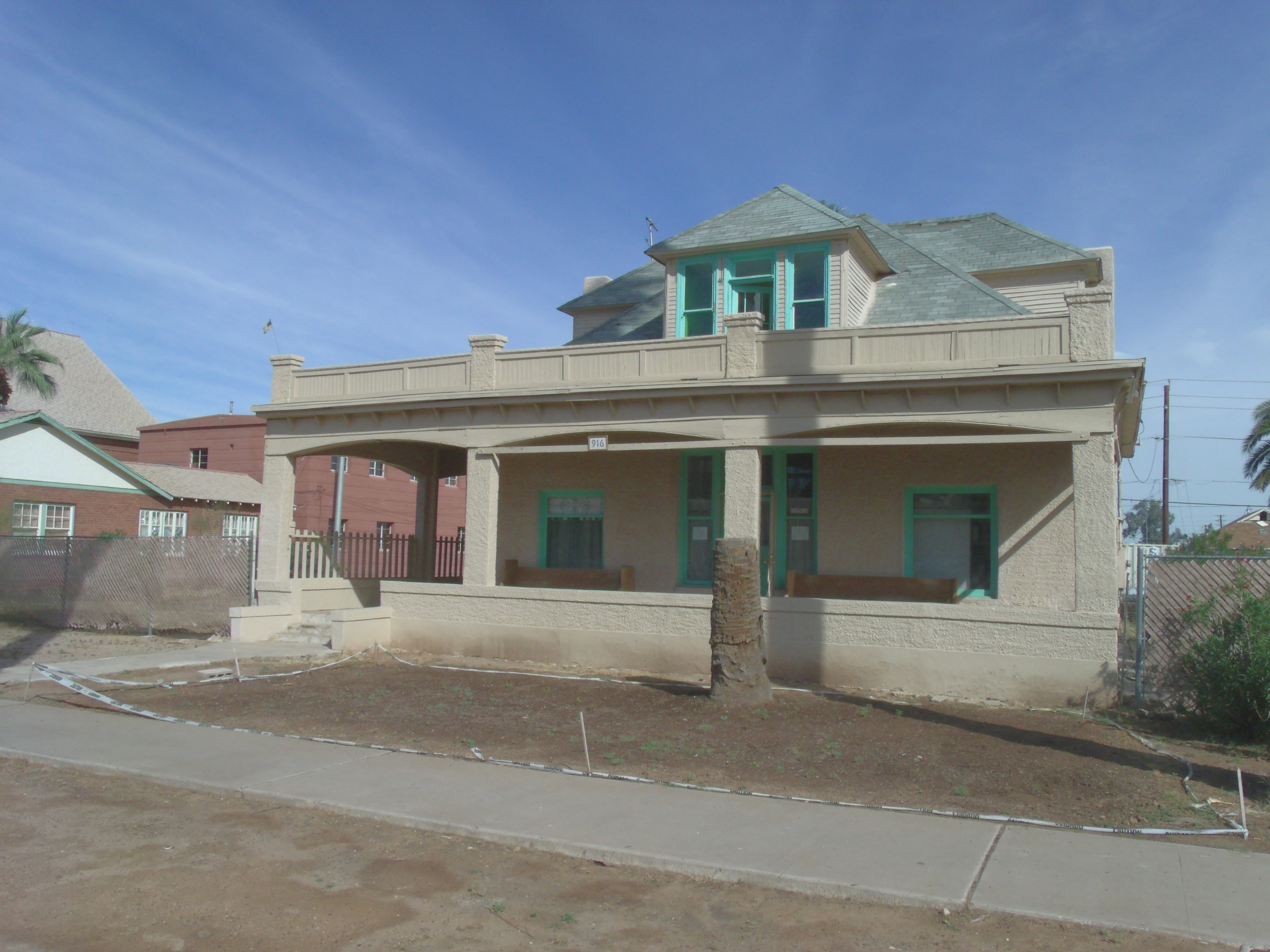
The George Cisney House was built in 1897 and is located at 916 E. McKinley St. It was listed in the National Register of Historic Places on January 12, 1995, reference #94001528.

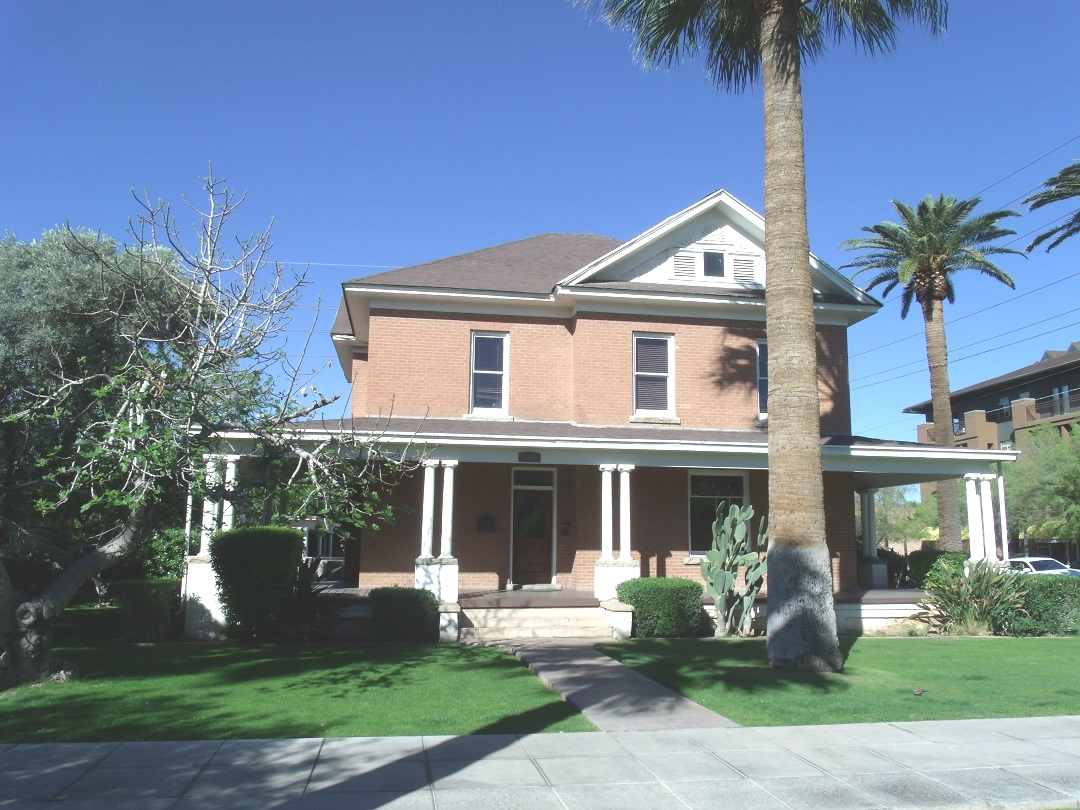
The O.C. Thompson House was built in 1897 and is located at 850 N. 2nd Avenue. The building was converted to apartments long after O.C. Thompson and family moved out and now houses several office spaces. Designated as a landmark with Historic Preservation-Landmark (HP-L) overlay zoning. The house is listed as historic by the Phoenix Historic Property Register.

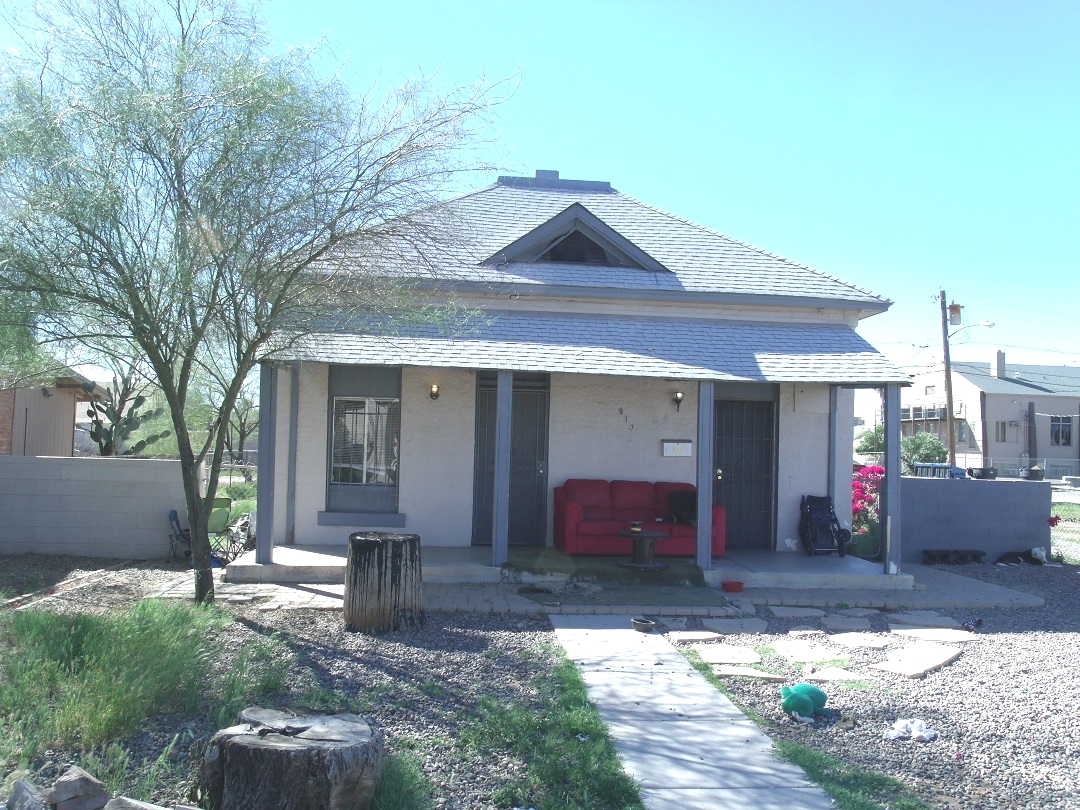
The E. W. Skinner House was built in 1899 and is located at 917 E. Roosevelt St. Skinner was a local contractor. It was listed in the National Register of Historic Places on January 12, 1995, reference #94001536.

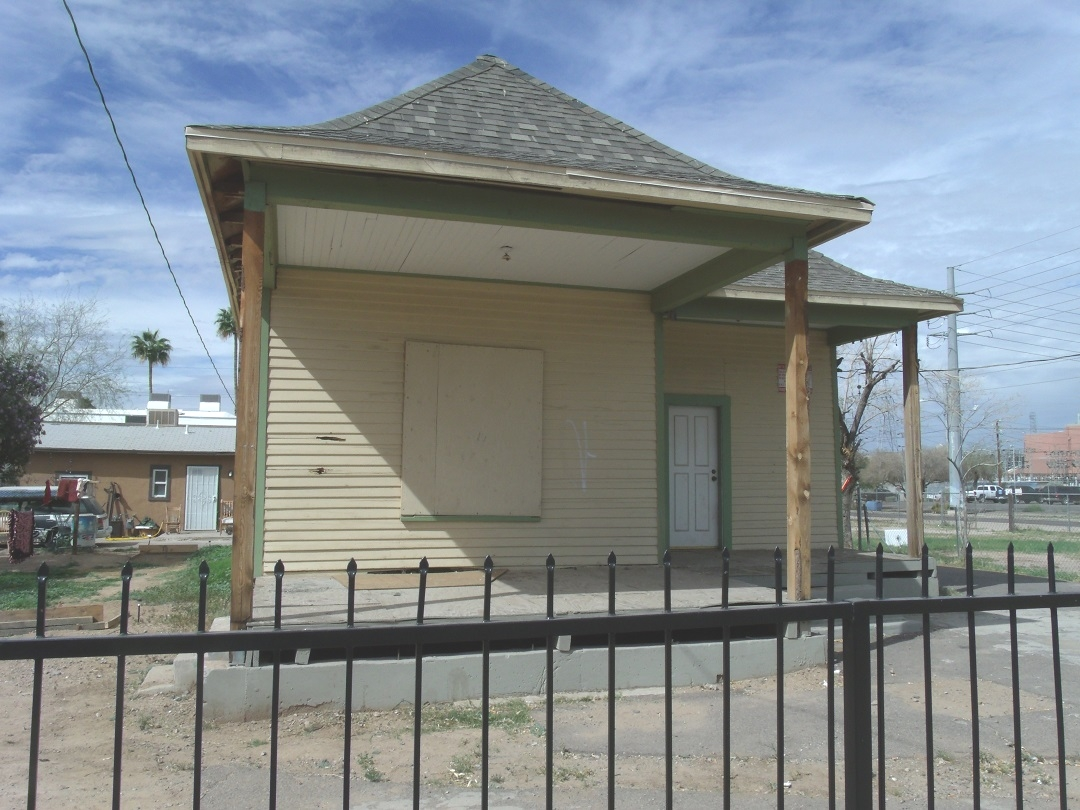
The C. A. Larson House was built in 1899 and is located at 7105 1st. Avenue. Listed in the National Register of Historic Places. Reference #9001533.

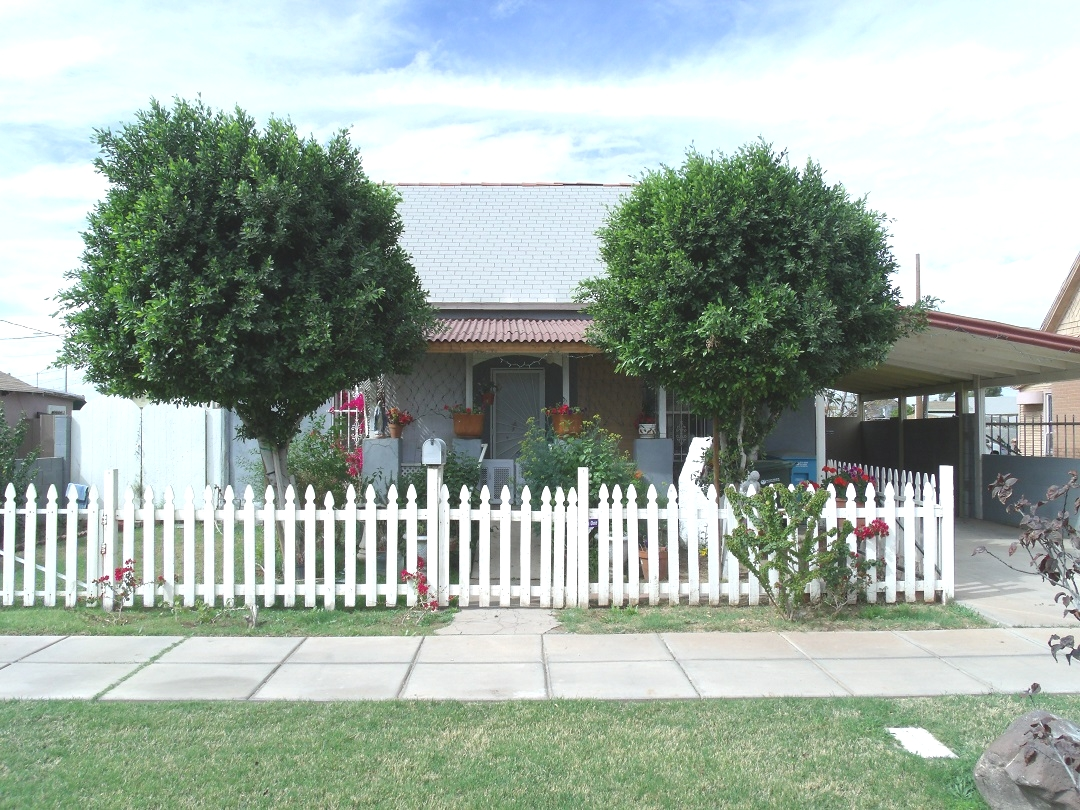
The W. E. Adams House was built in 1899 and is located at 1014 S. 1st. Avenue. Listed in the National Register of Historic Places. Reference #94001524.

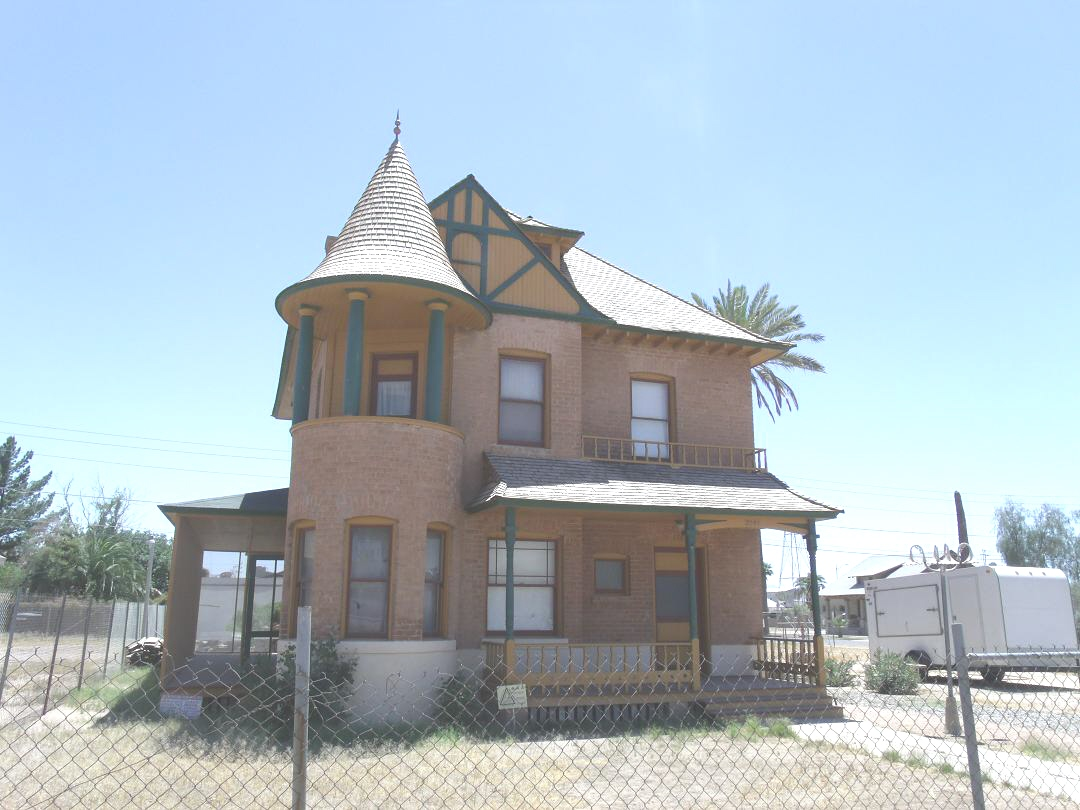
The Dougherty-Peterson House was built in 1899 and is located at 2141 W. Washington St. The house is listed as historic by the Phoenix Historic Property Register.

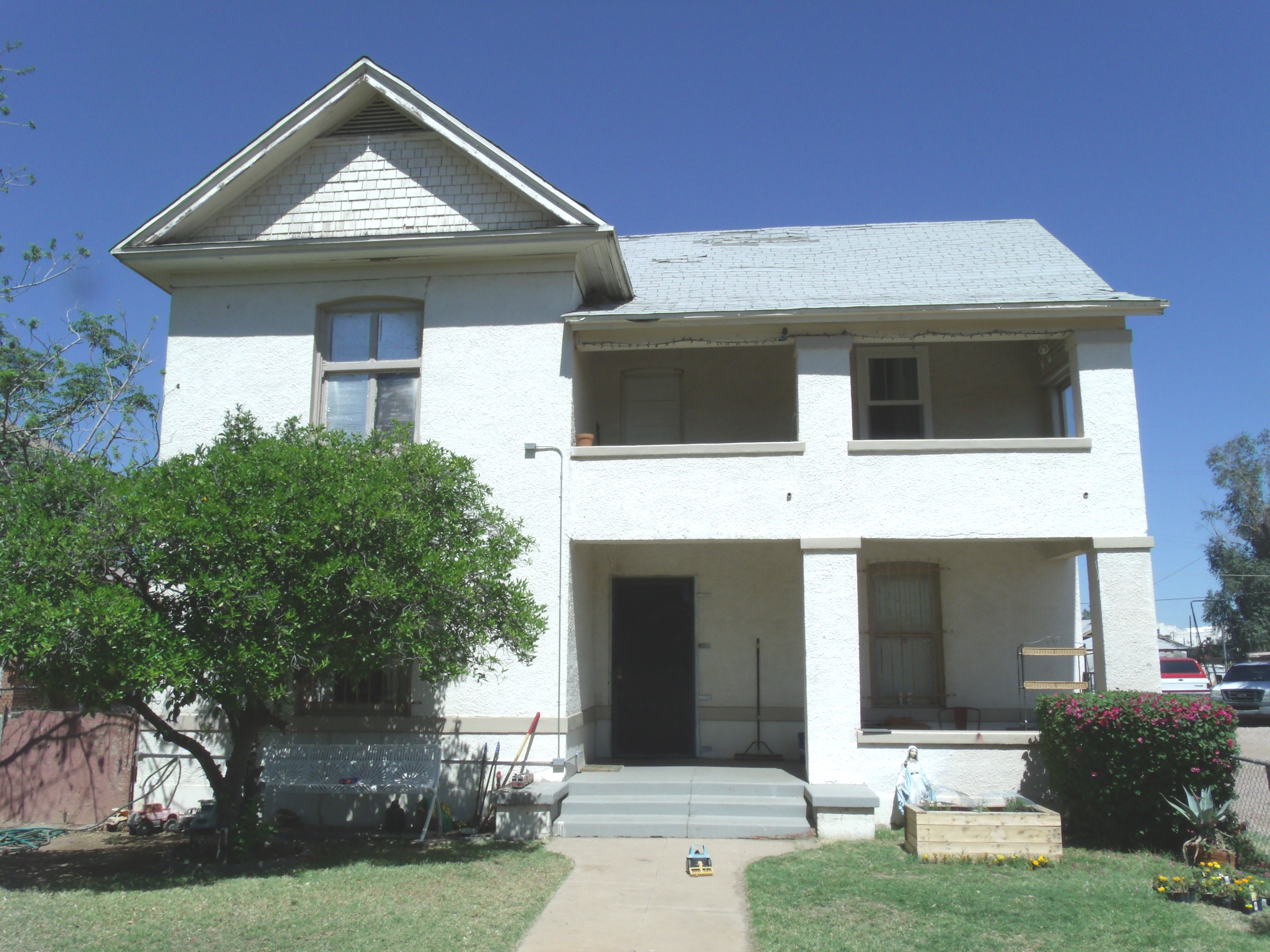
The William & Nathalie Pinney House was built in 1899 and is located at 1930 W. Adams St. It was listed in the Phoenix Historic Property Register in November 2007.

=== 20th century historic houses ===
The following prominent people who at one time or another lived in Phoenix and whose houses are listed here are:

- Dr. Charles "Charley" Borah, an American athlete, who won the gold medal in the 4 × 100 m relay at the 1928 Summer Olympics.
- Jorgine Slettede Boomer, the widow of Lucius Boomer, a successful hotelier. Her house was designed by Frank Lloyd Wright.
- Dr. George Brockway, a physician who served as the Pinal County Superintendent of Public Health as well as two terms as Mayor of Florence.
- L. Ron Hubbard, the founder of the Church of Scientology religion.
- John McCain, a statesman who served as a United States Senator from Arizona from January 1987 until his death. He previously served two terms in the United States House of Representatives and was the Republican nominee for President of the United States in the 2008 election.
- Colonel James McClintock, whose full name was "James Henry McClintock", was a veteran of the United States Army who served in the Spanish–American War. He moved to Arizona and served as state historian from 1917 through 1922. He was also one of the founders of the Arizona Republican newspaper, now The Arizona Republic.
- Dr. James C. Norton, the territorial veterinarian.
- Wing F. Ong, the first person born in China to be elected to a state legislative house.
- Henry E. Pierce, who served as County Assessor during the 1920s and was secretary to Governor John C. Phillips from 1929 until 1932. He was chairperson of the Maricopa County Republican Central Committee. In addition to his political activities, Pierce was a partner in the real estate firm of Jacobs & Pierce.
- Aubrey and Winstona Aldridge. Winstona Hackett was the daughter of Dr. Winston Hackett the first African-American doctor in the area, and her husband Aubrey Aldridge.
- William Wrigley Jr., the Chewing-gum magnate whose mansion in Phoenix is known by some people as "La Colina Solana".
Historic houses built in the 20th century in Phoenix, Arizona
(NRHP = National Register of Historic Places)
(PHPR = Phoenix Historic Property Register)
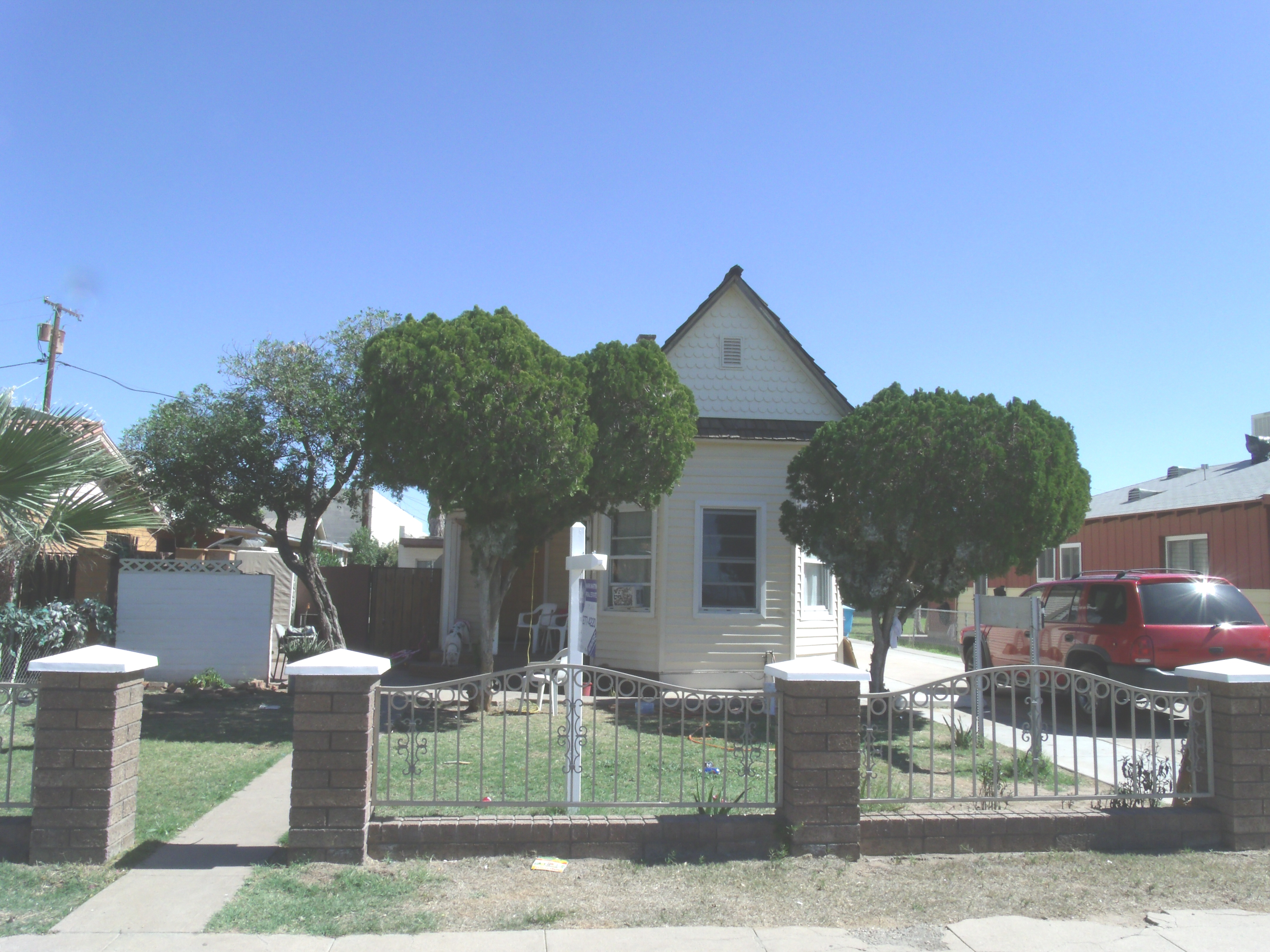
The M.J. Sharp House was built in 1900 and is located at 1012 S, 1st. Avenue. On January 12, 1995 it was listed in the National register of Historic Places, ref.: #954001535.

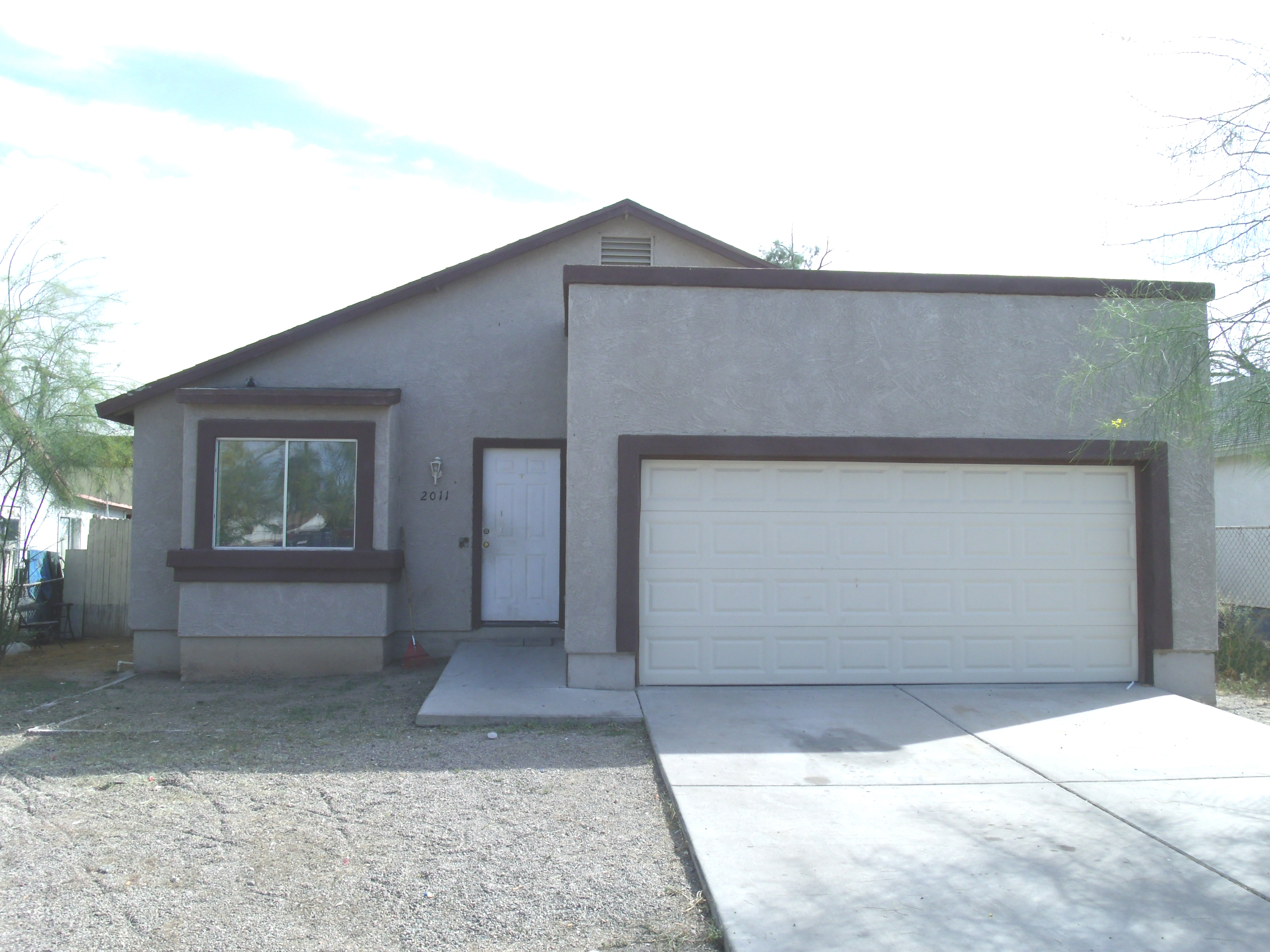
The C. W. Cisney House was built in 1900 and is located at 2011 W. Madison St. C. W. Cisney House' built the house which is constructed in the Colonial Revival architectural style and represents the Builder's Plan Book property type. It was listed in the National Register of Historic Places on January 12, 1995, reference #94001527.

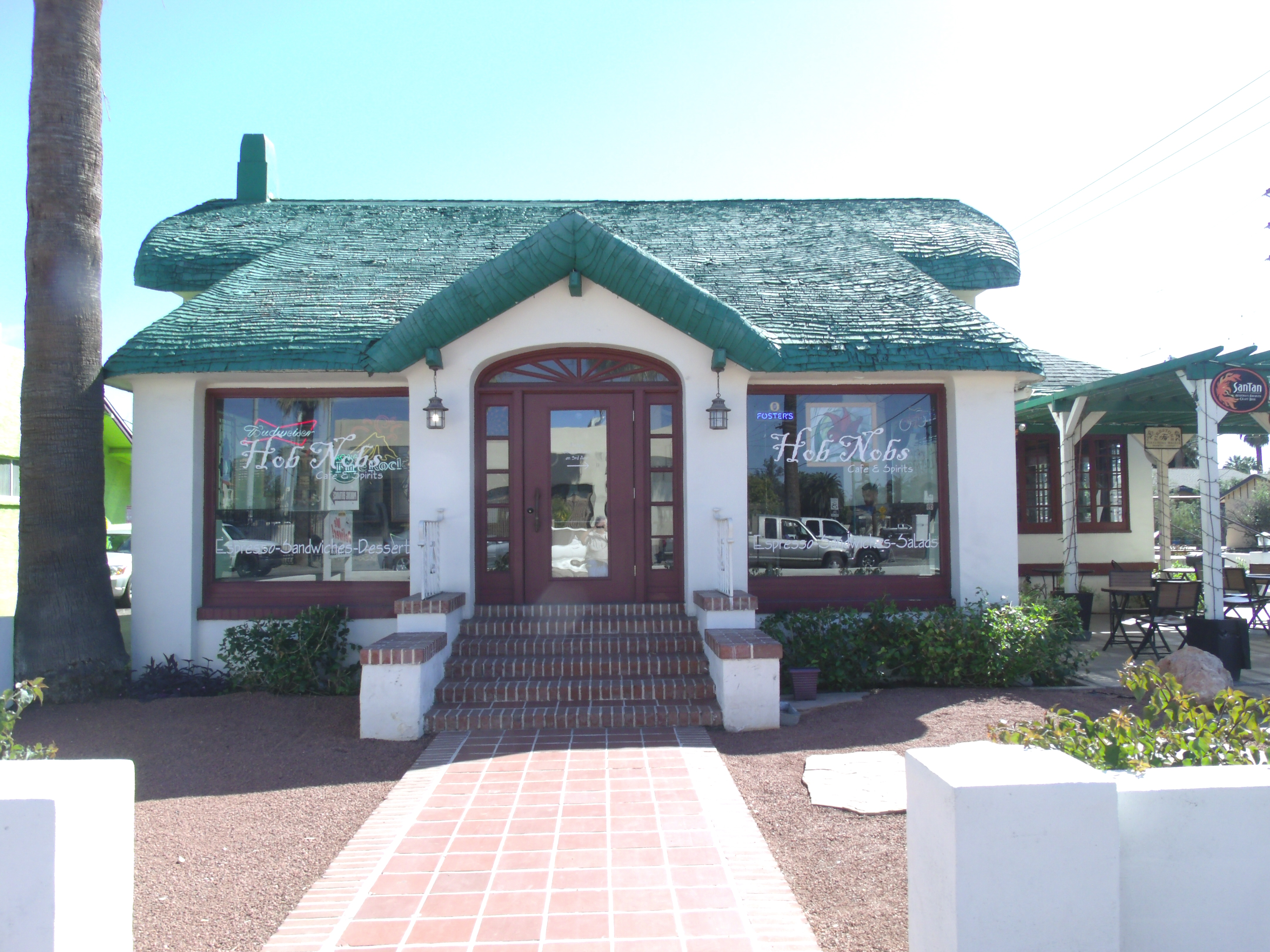
The Helen Anderson House was built in 1900 and is located at 149 W. McDowell Road. The property was listed in the National Register of Historic Places in 1983, ref.: #83002449.

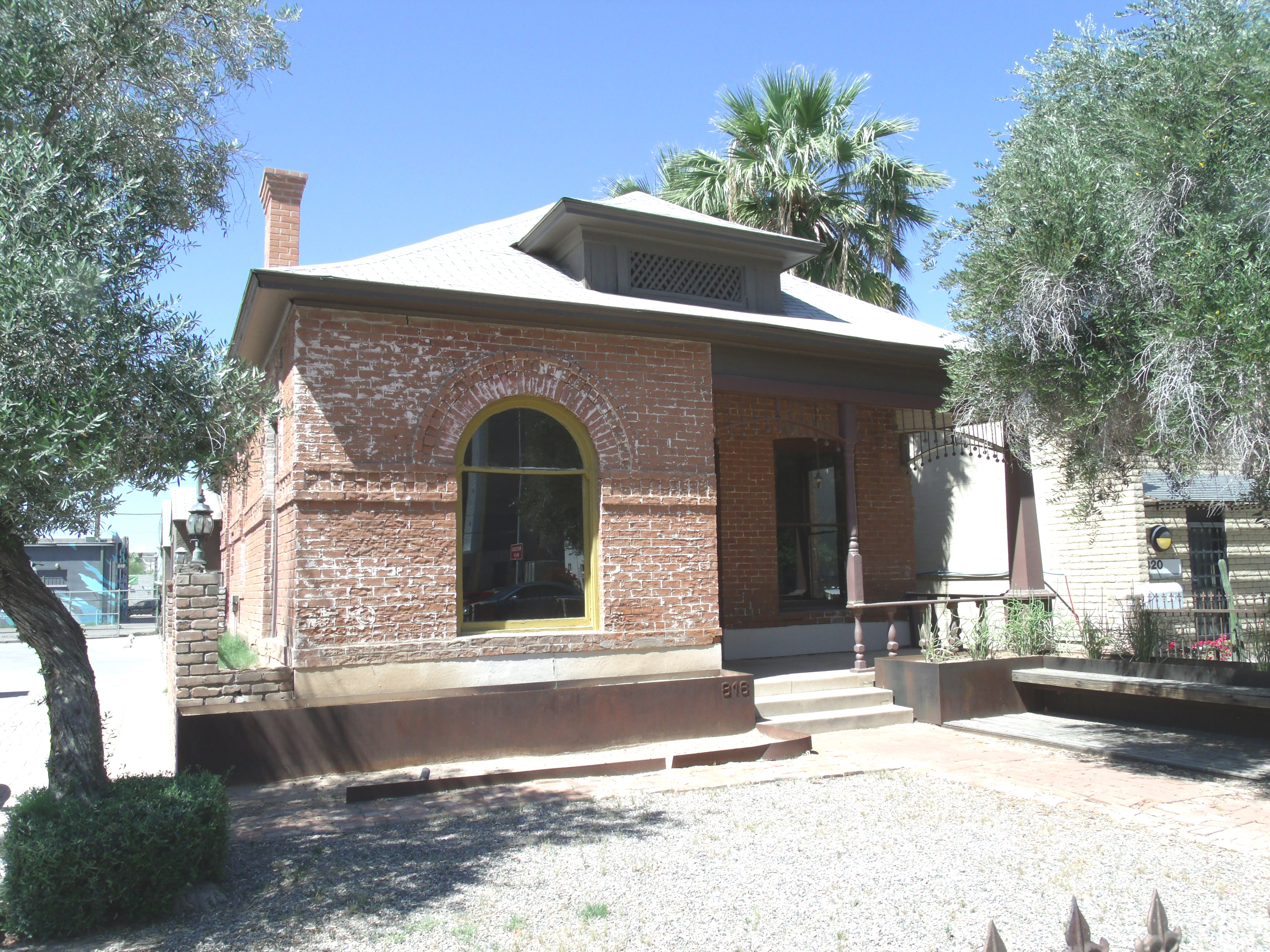
The William A. Farish House was built in 1900 and is located at 816 N. Third St. It was listed in the Phoenix Historic Property Register in October 2002.

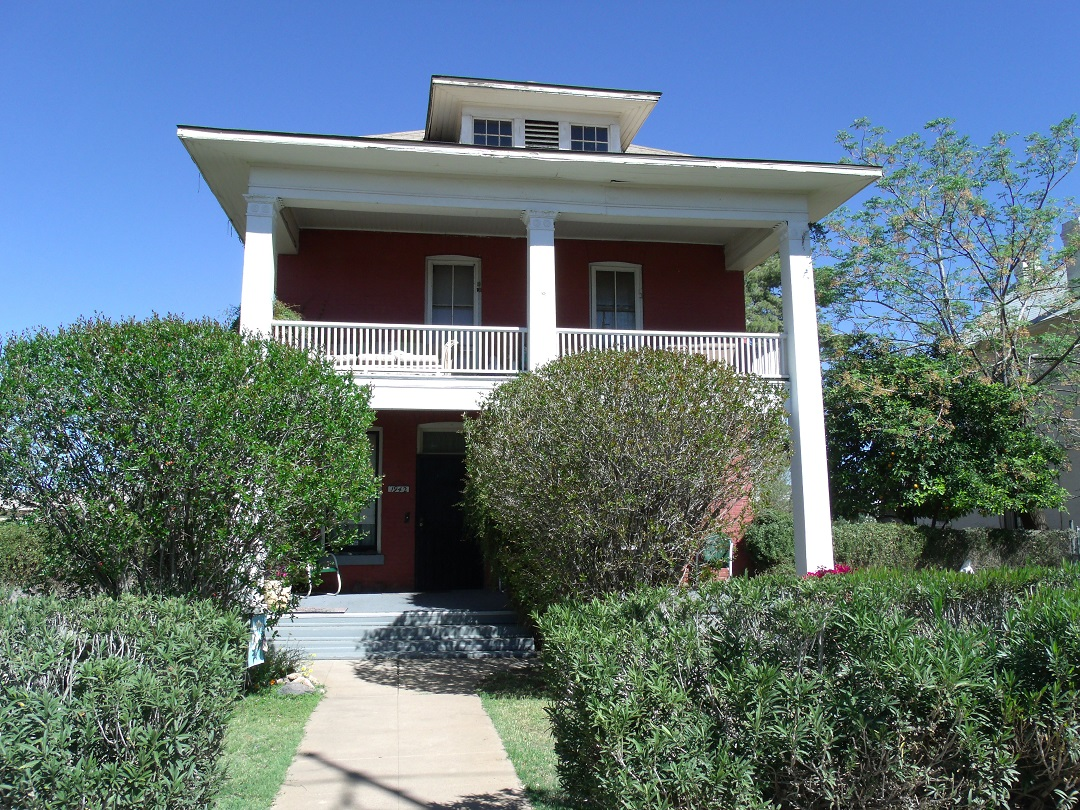
The William and Mary Grier House was built in 1901 and located at 1942 W. Adams St. William Grier was a merchant who took to ranching after moving to Arizona in 1896. He built the house as a primary residence for himself and his wife, Mary. Designated as a landmark with Historic Preservation-Landmark (HP-L) overlay zoning. It was listed in the Phoenix Historic Property Register.

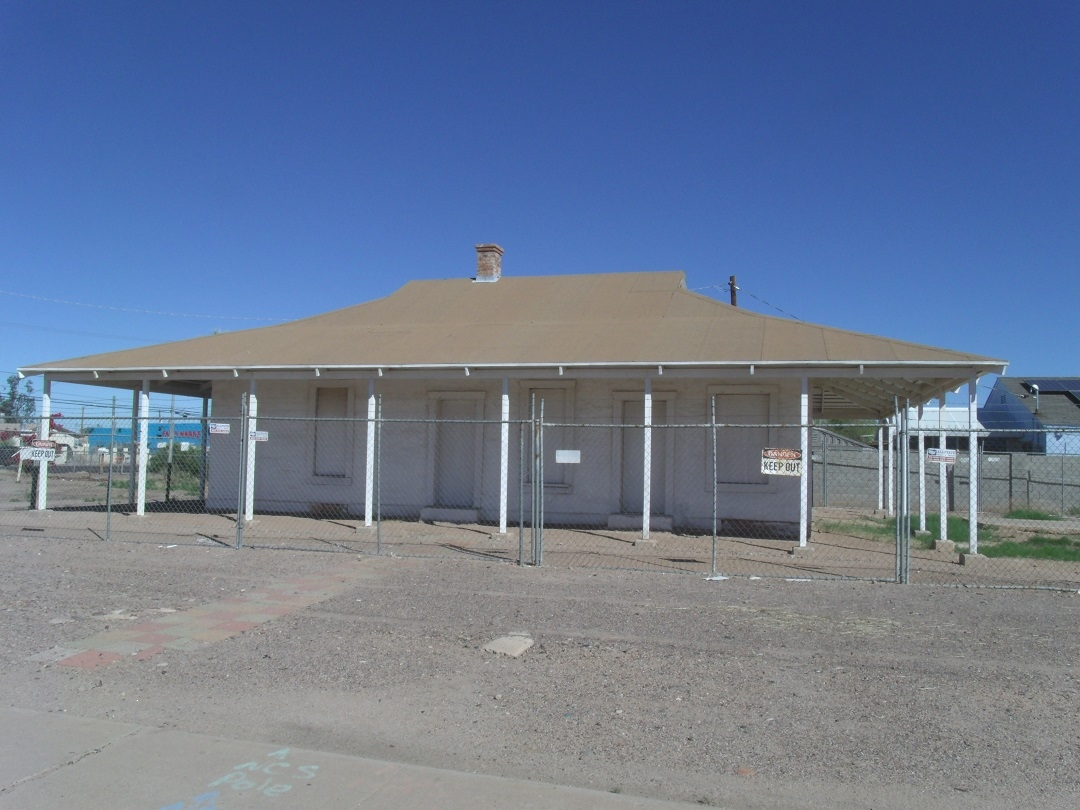
The Kunz-Carbajal House (formally known as the Montgomery Homestead) was built in 1904 and is located at 1721 S. 7th Avenue. Built by pioneer Louis Kunz, it is among the oldest adobe houses still in existence in Phoenix. The house was later sold to Felix Carbajal, one of the first Filipinos to live in Phoenix. The house is listed as historic by the Phoenix Historic Property Register.

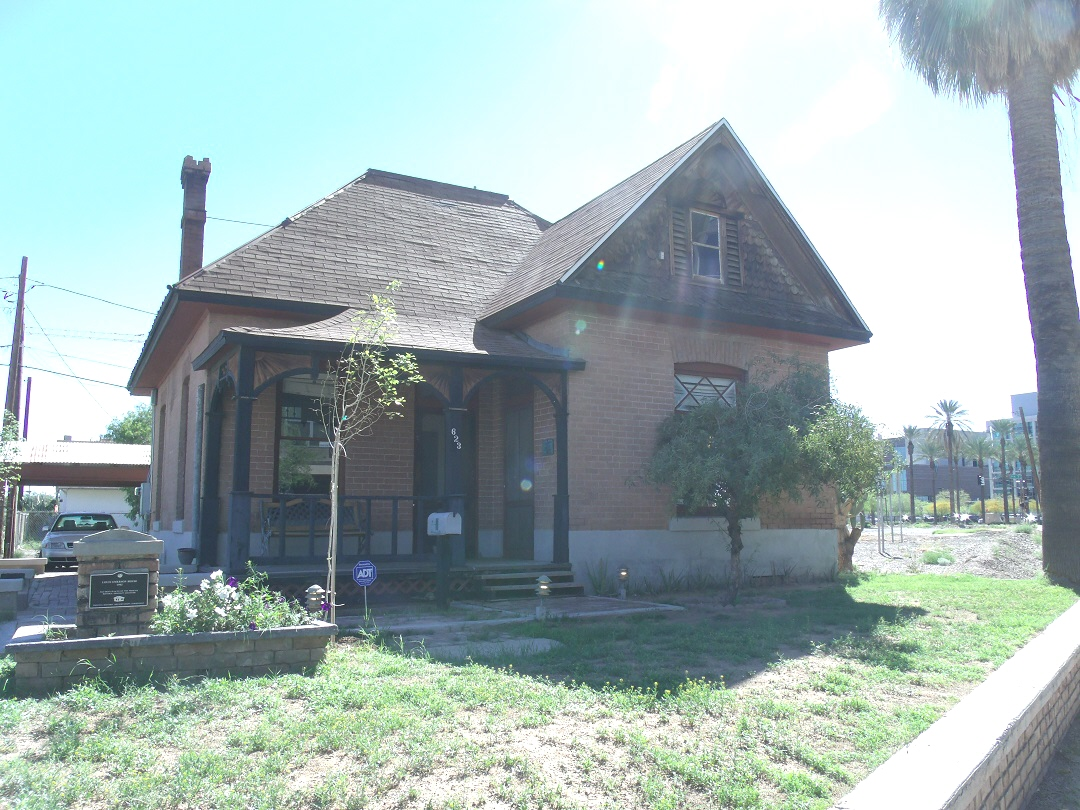
The Louis Emerson House was built in 1904 and is located at 623 N. 4th St. Emerson was a butcher for the "Palace Meat Market". He used to advertise "Meat fit for a king." Designated as a landmark with Historic Preservation-Landmark (HP-L) overlay zoning. It was listed in the Phoenix Historic Property Register

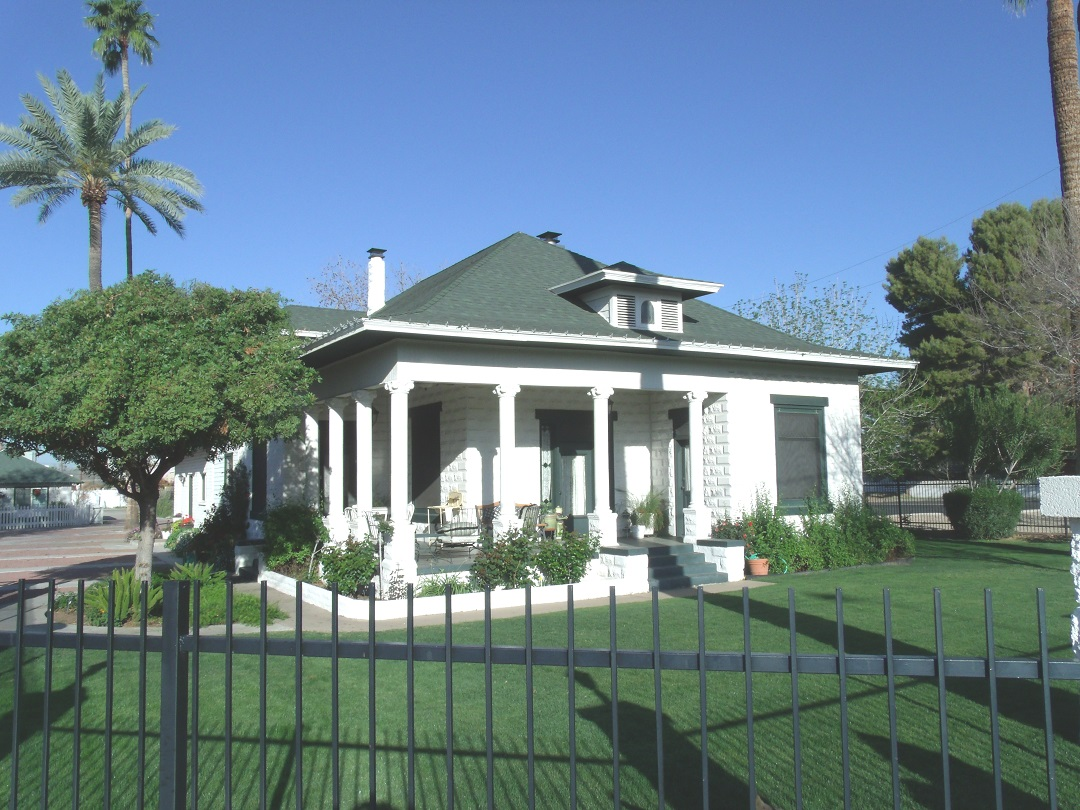
The Adam Diller/Lightning "Z" Ranch House was built in 1904 and is located at 8702 N. 7th Avenue. The ranch house is one of the few remaining once-isolated ranch houses that dotted the outskirts of the city in the early part of the century. Designated as a landmark with Historic Preservation-Landmark (HP-L) overlay zoning. It was listed in the Phoenix Historic Property Register

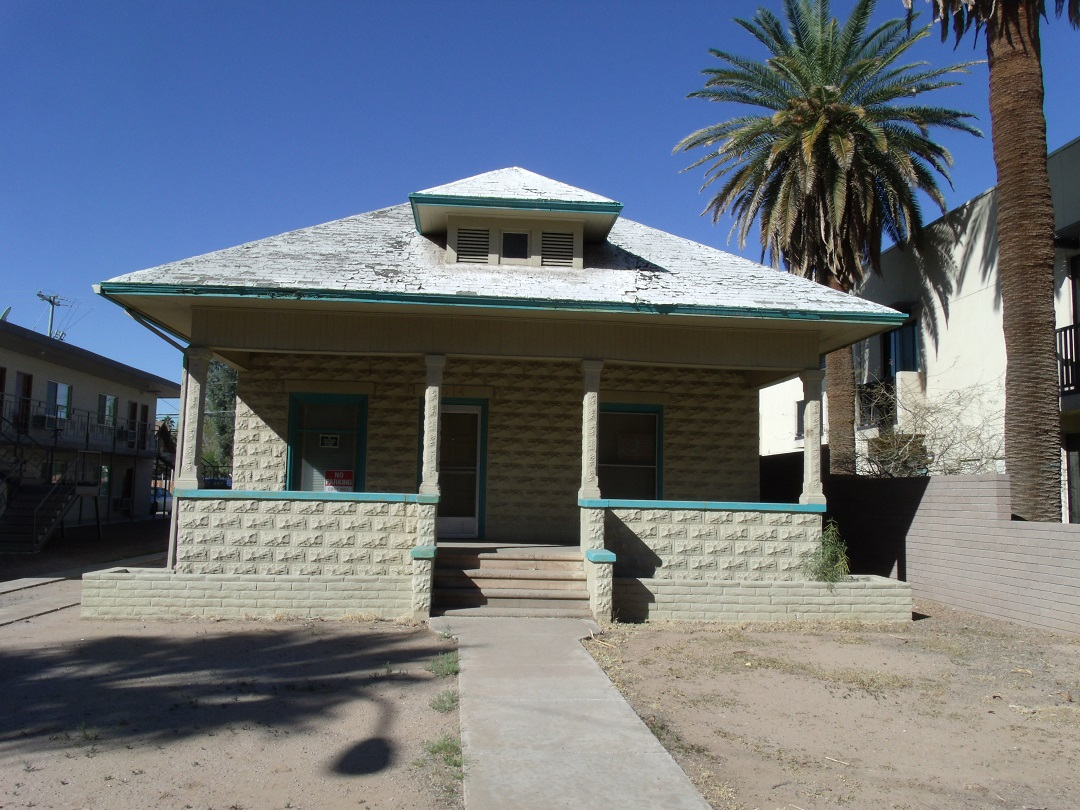
The Concrete Block Neoclassical House was built in 1906 and is located at 614 N. 4th Avenue. On November 30, 1983, it was listed in the National Register of Historic Places ref. number 83003455.

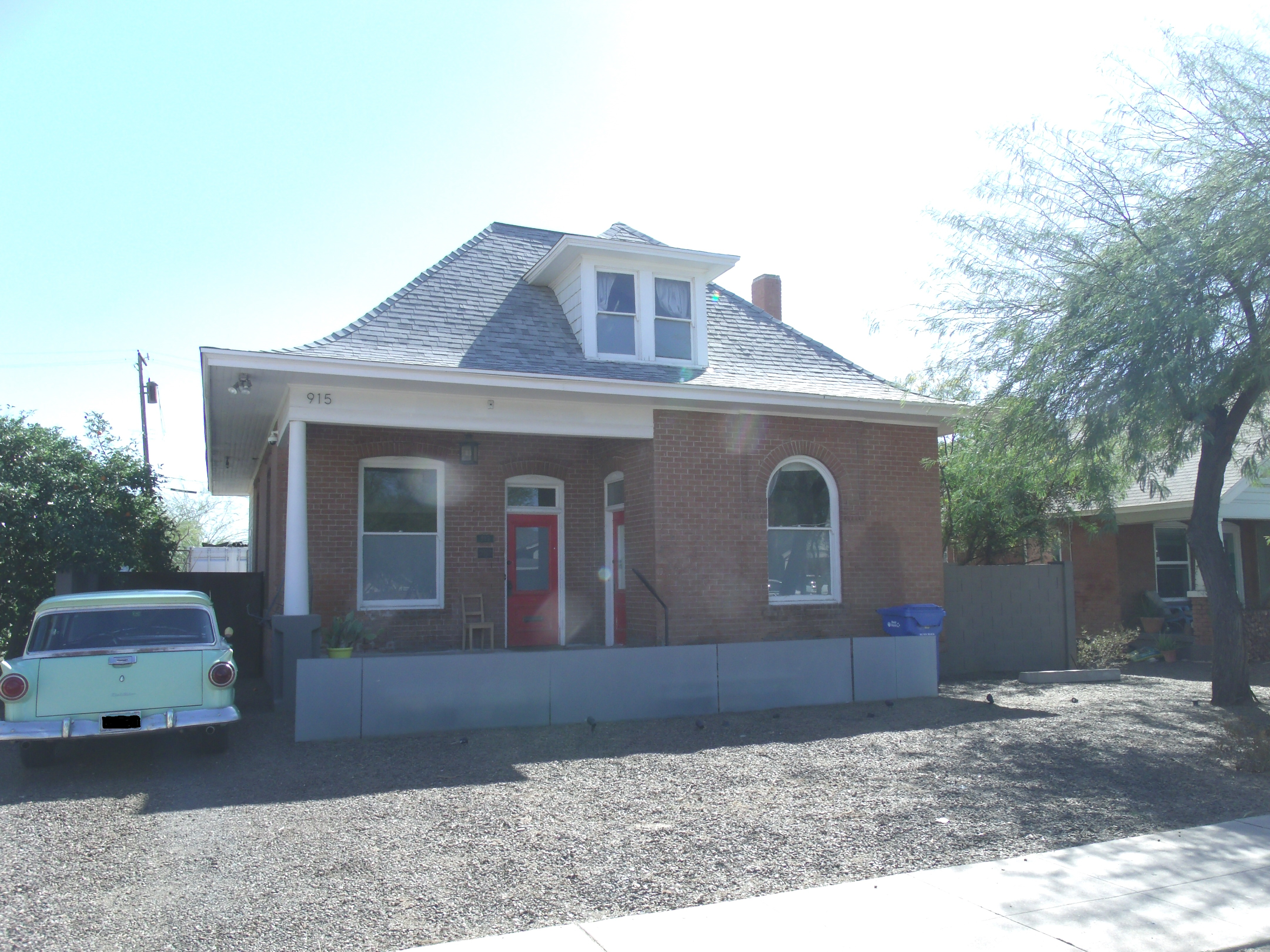
The Grand Pyramid House was built in 1907 and is located at 915 E, Pierce Street. The house was listed in the National Register of Historic Places in 1907, ref.: #02000800.

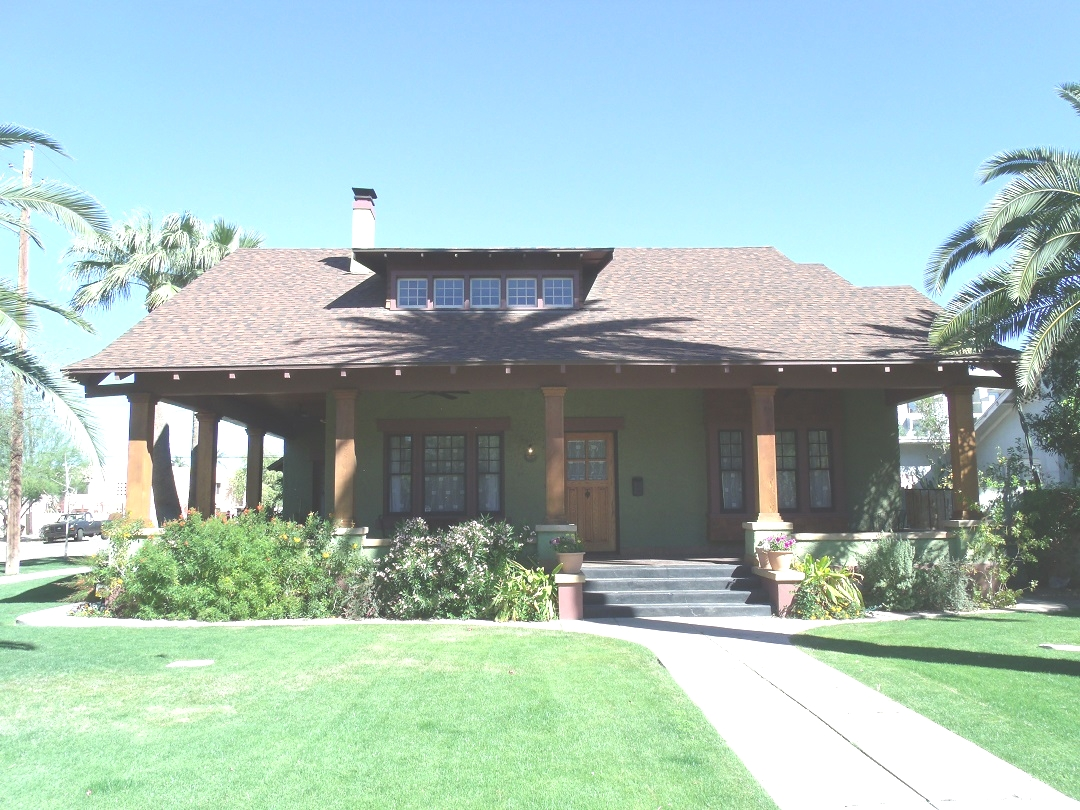
The Dr. George Brockway House was built in 1908 and is located at 506 E. Portland St. Dr. Brockway was a physician who moved to Florence, Arizona from New York in 1894. He served as the Pinal County superintendent of public health as well as two terms as mayor of Florence. He later relocated to Phoenix and built this house in what is now the Evans-Churchill neighborhood of Phoenix. It was listed in the Phoenix Historic Property Register

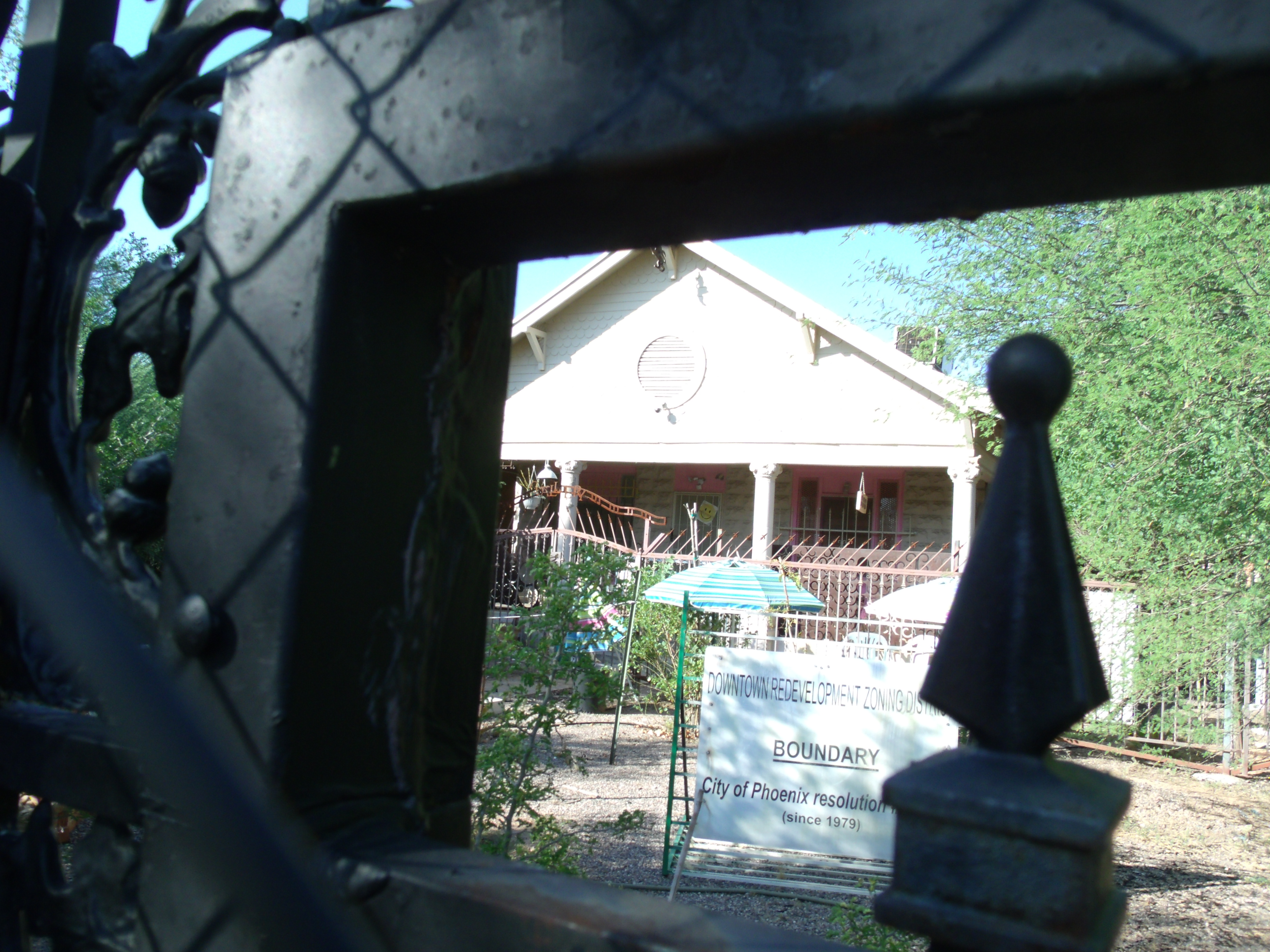
The Concrete Block Bungalow was built in 1908 and is located at 606 N. 9th Street, Phoenix. It was listed in the Phoenix Historic Property Register in February 2005. This property is considered to be an endangered historic house which someday may be demolished.

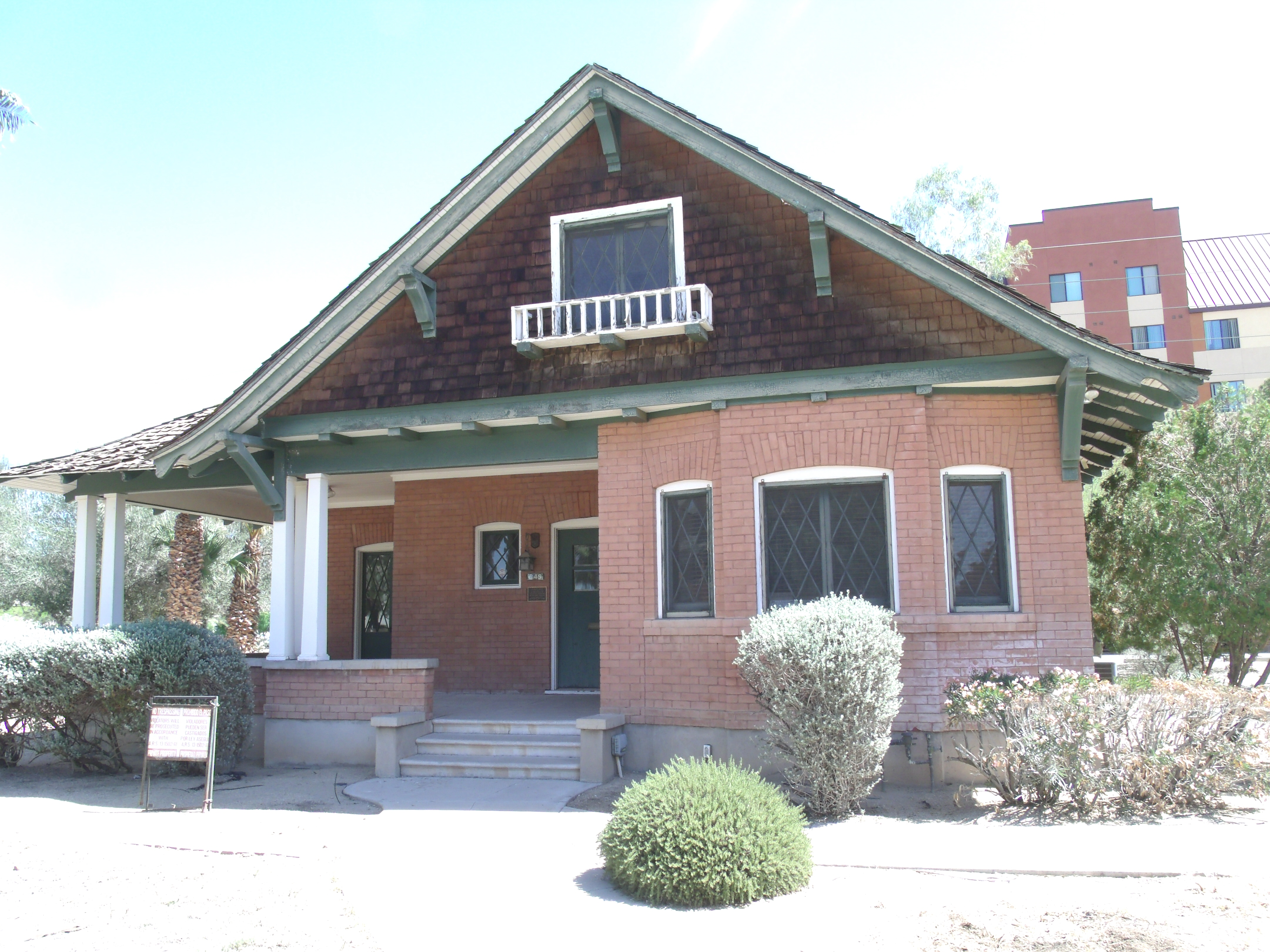
The Elizabeth Seargeant-Emery Oldaker House was built in 1909 and is located at 649 N. Third Avenue. It was listed in the National Register of Historic Places on November 30, 1983, reference #83003472.

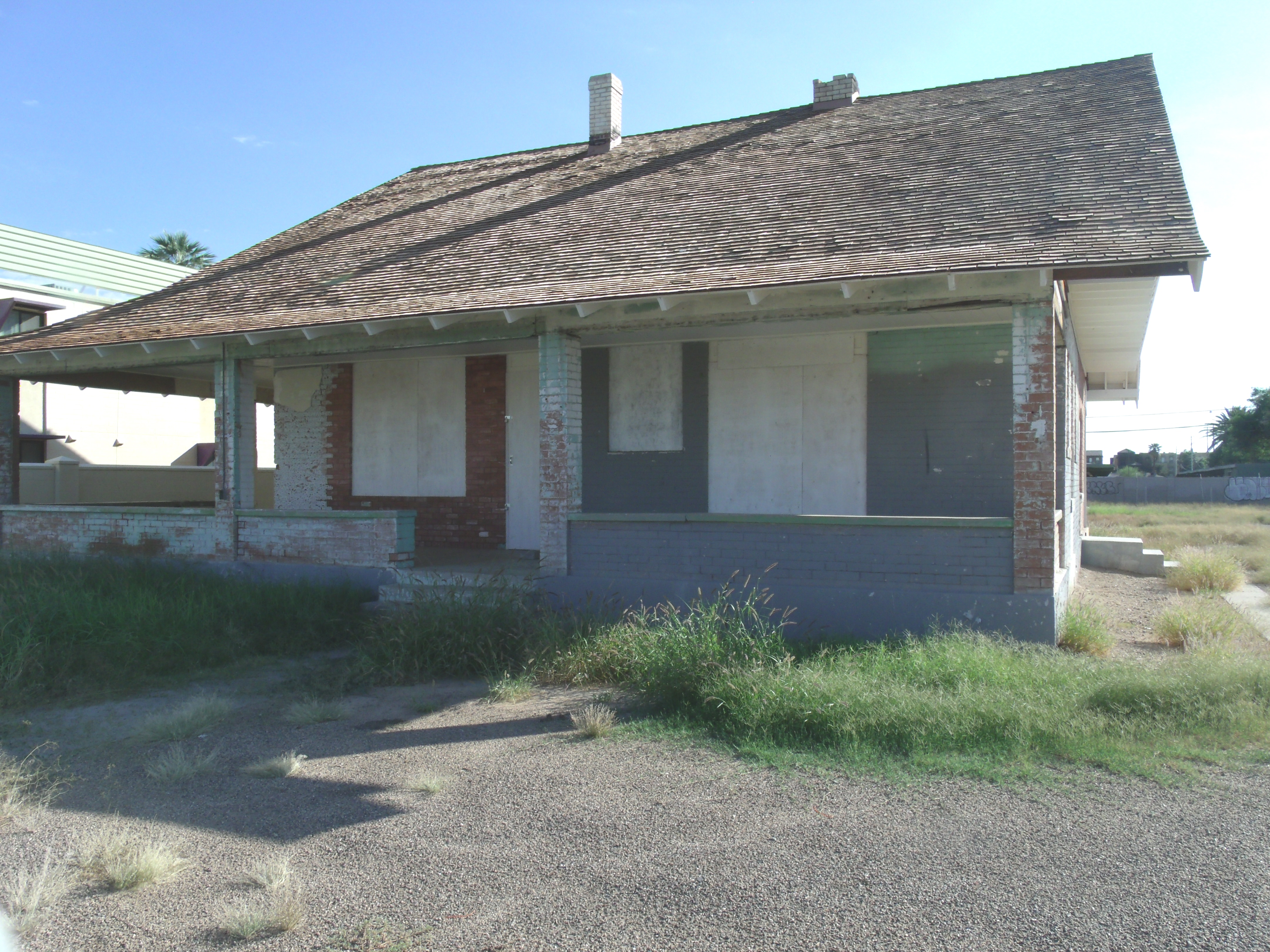
The Leighton G. Knipe House was built in 1909 and is located at 1025 N. 2nd Avenue. The house is listed in the Phoenix Historic Property Register. This property is considered to be an endangered historic house which someday may be demolished.

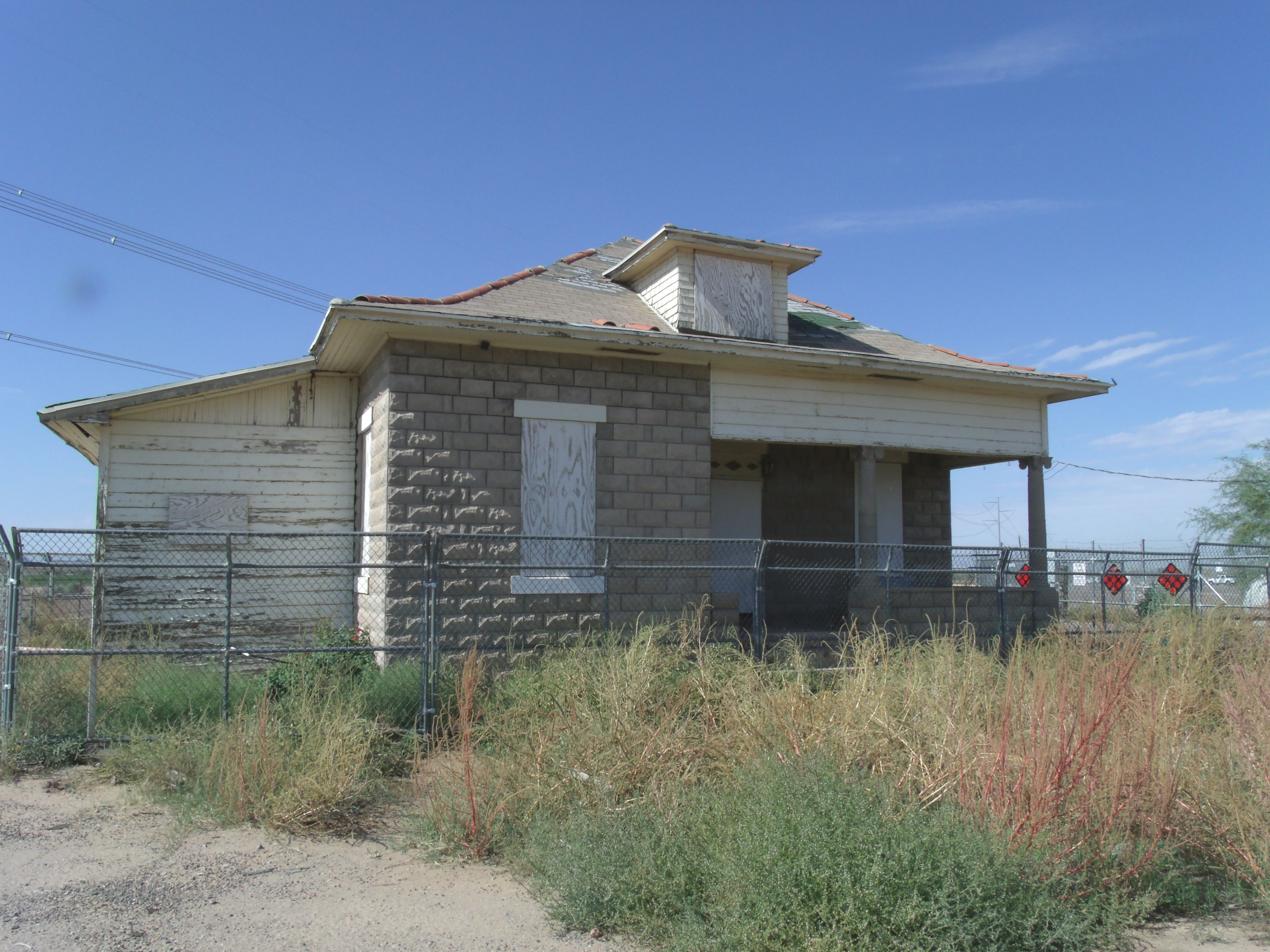
The Sach's-Webster Farmstead House was built in 1909 and is located in the Northwest corner of 75th Avenue and Baseline. The house was listed in the Phoenix Historic Property Register in December 2003. This property is considered to be an endangered historic house which someday may be demolished.

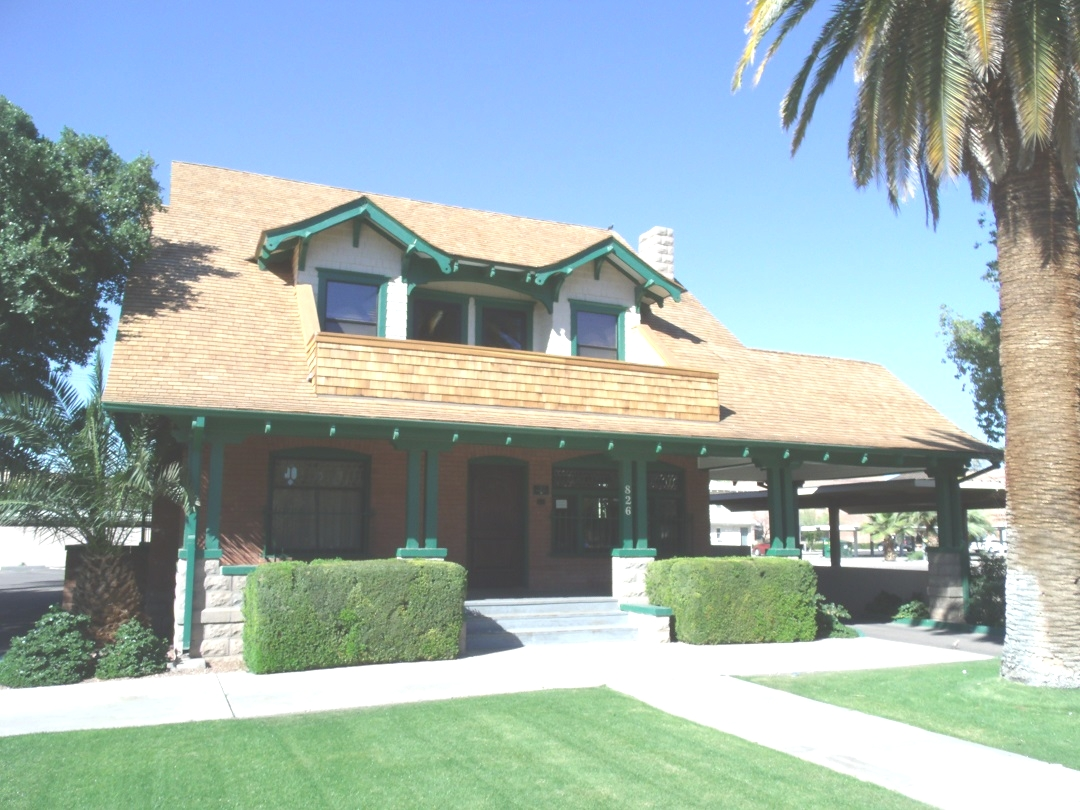
The Henry Campbell House was built in 1910 and is located at 826 3rd. Avenue. Designated as a landmark with Historic Preservation Landmark (HP-L) overlay zoning. It was listed in the Phoenix Historic Property Register.

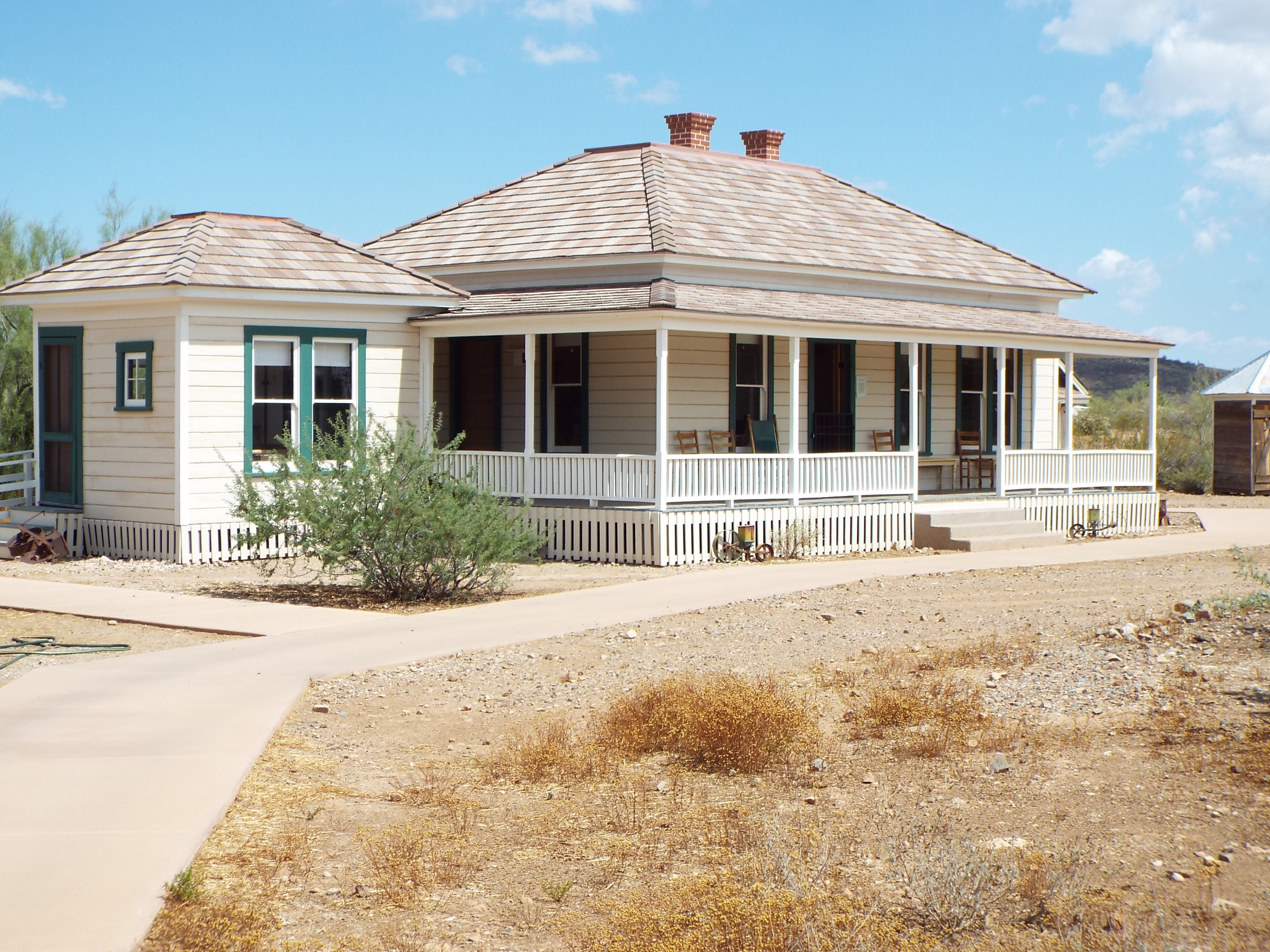
The Meritt Farm House which was built in 1910 on 100 acres which John and Emma Meritt purchased in Phoenix. The house was donated to the Pioneer Living History Museum

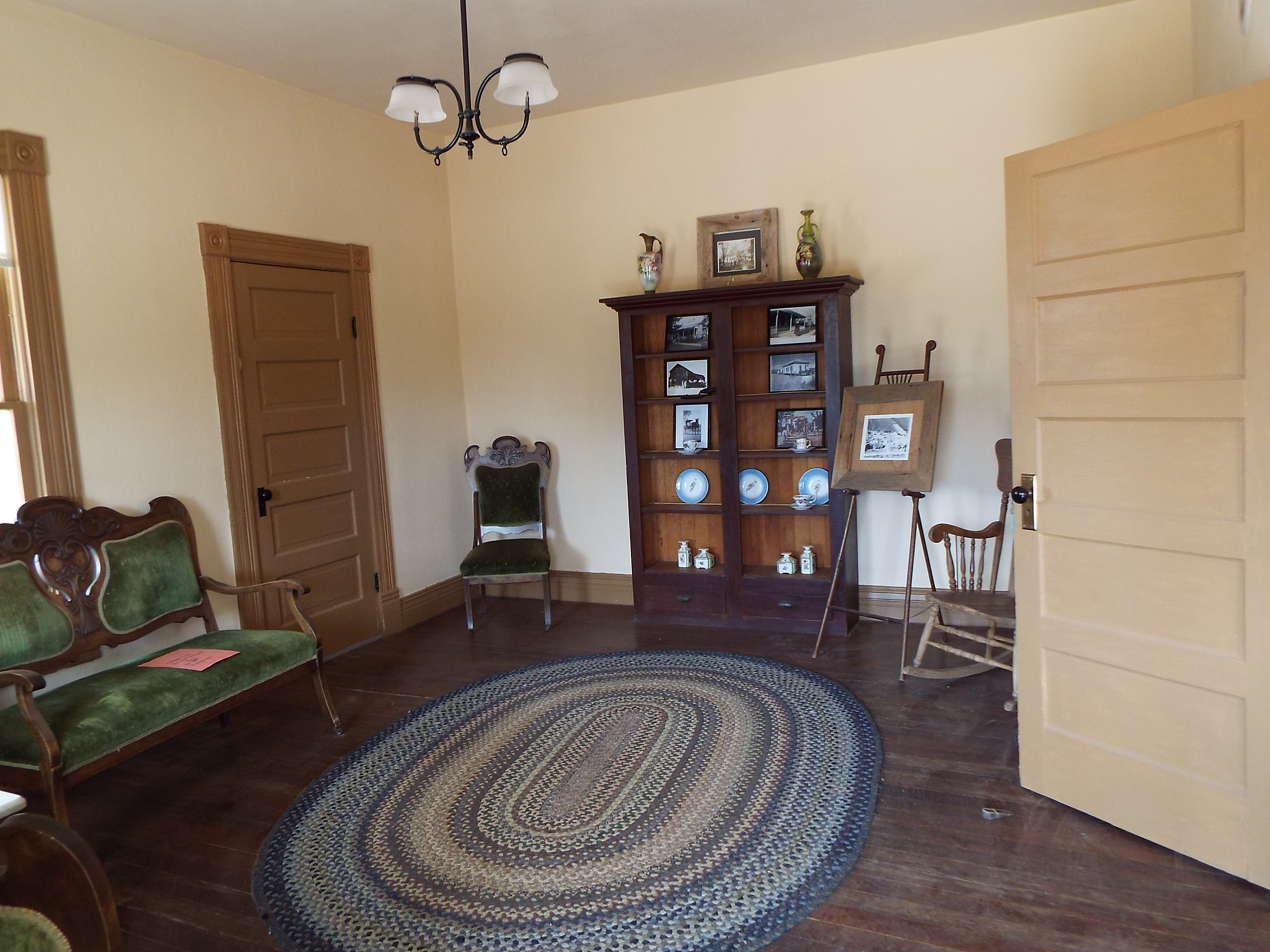
Inside the Meritt Farm House.

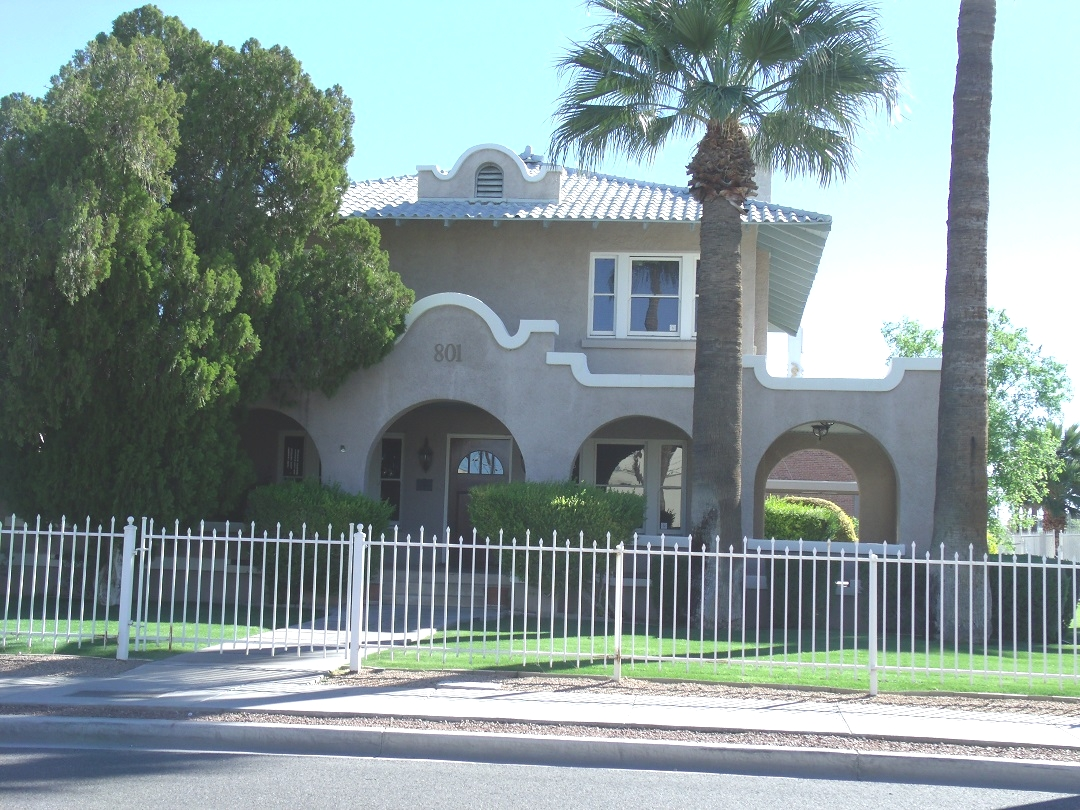
The Stoddard-Harmon House was built in 1910 and is located ta 801 N. 1st. Avenue. It was owned at one time by Celora Stoddard and Lon Harmon. Listed in the National Register of Historic Places on November 30, 1983, reference #83003451.

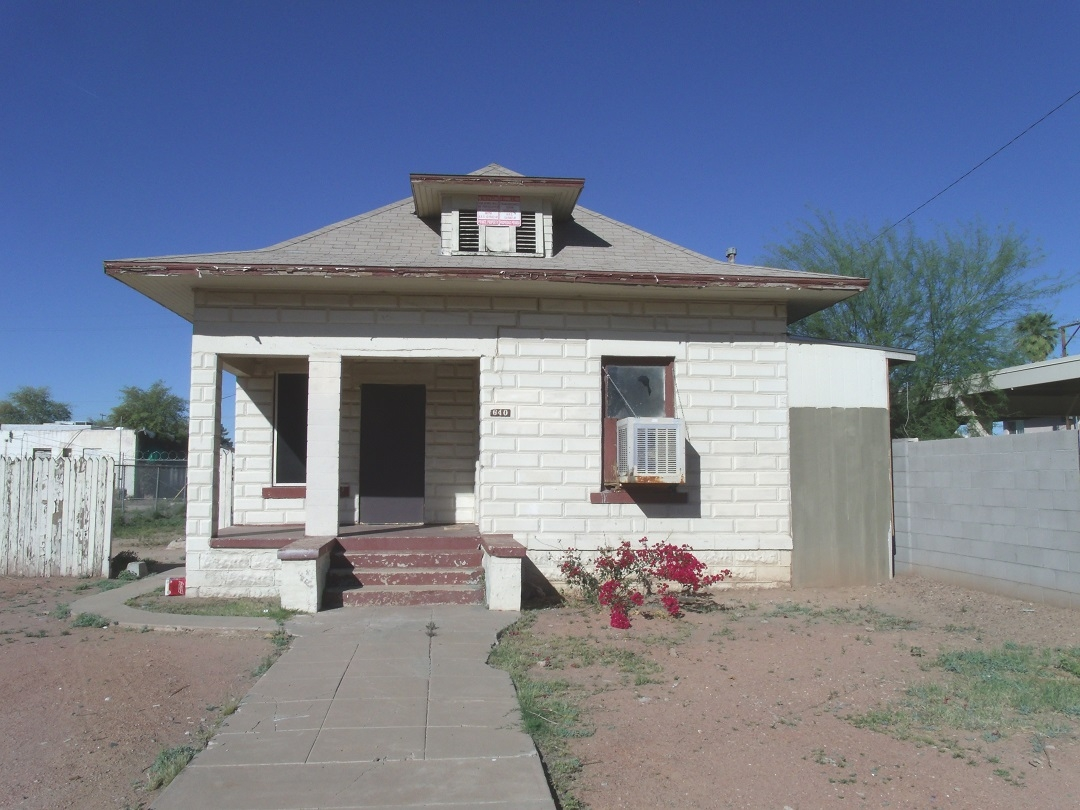
The Concrete Block House was built in 1910 and is located at 640 N. 6th Avenue. It was listed in the National Register of Historic Places on November 30, 1983, reference #83003456.

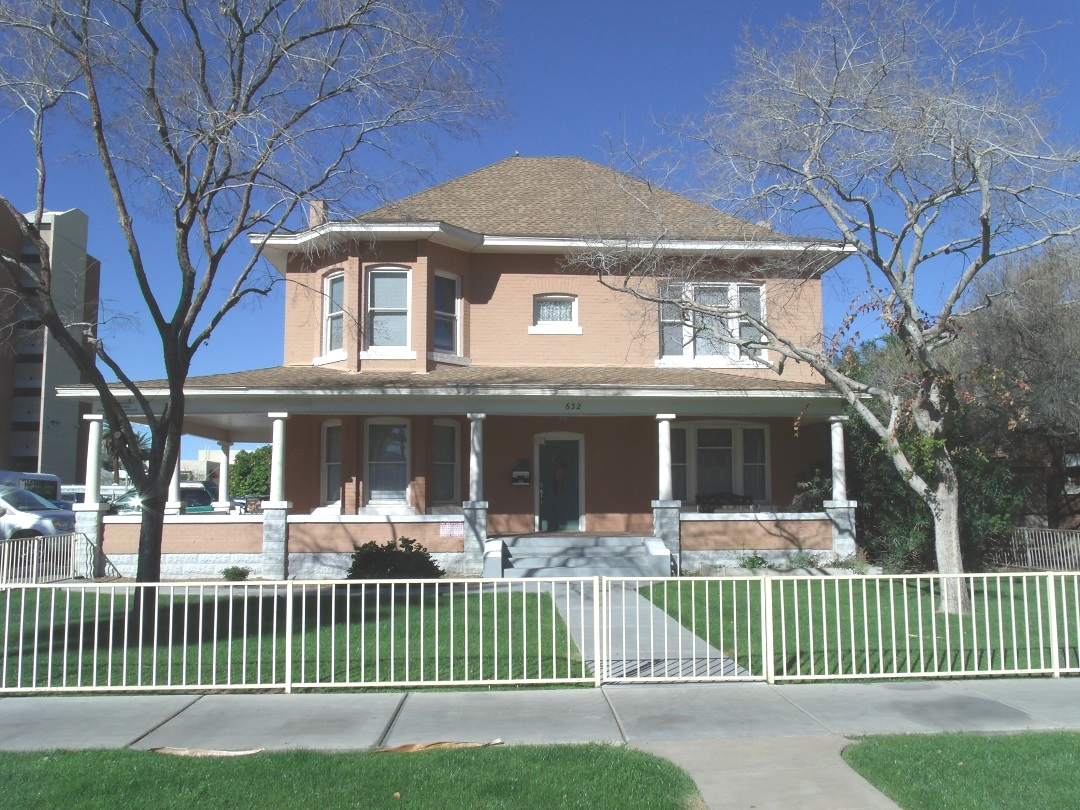
The Harry E. Pierce House was built in 1910 and is located at 632 N. 3rd Avenue. The house is the former residence of Harry E. Pierce. Pierce served as County Assessor during the 1920s, was secretary to Governor John C. Phillips from 1929 until 1932, and was chairperson of the Maricopa County Republican Central Committee. In addition to his political activities, Pierce was a partner in the real estate firm of Jacobs & Pierce. Pierce lived here from about 1911 until about 1930. It was listed in the National Register of Historic Places in 1983, reference #83003493.

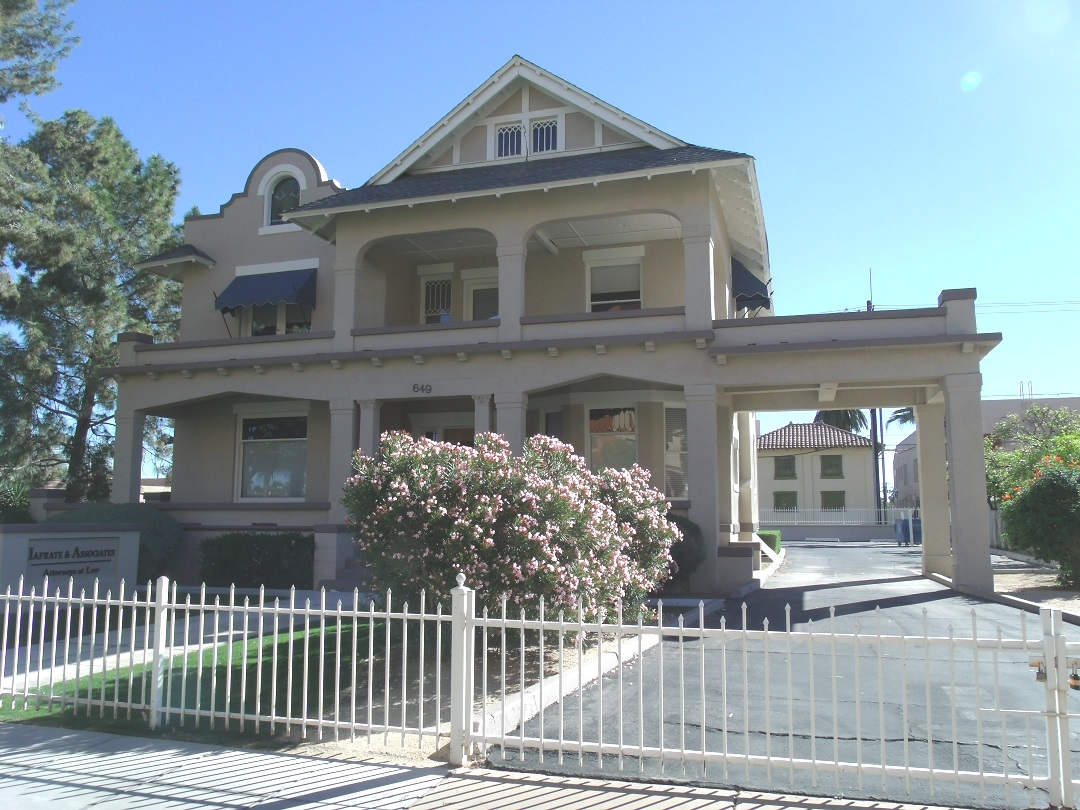
The Herman P. DeMund House was built in 1910 and is located at 649 N. Second Avenue. Designated as a landmark with Historic Preservation-Landmark (HP-L) overlay zoning. It was listed in the Phoenix Historic Property Register.

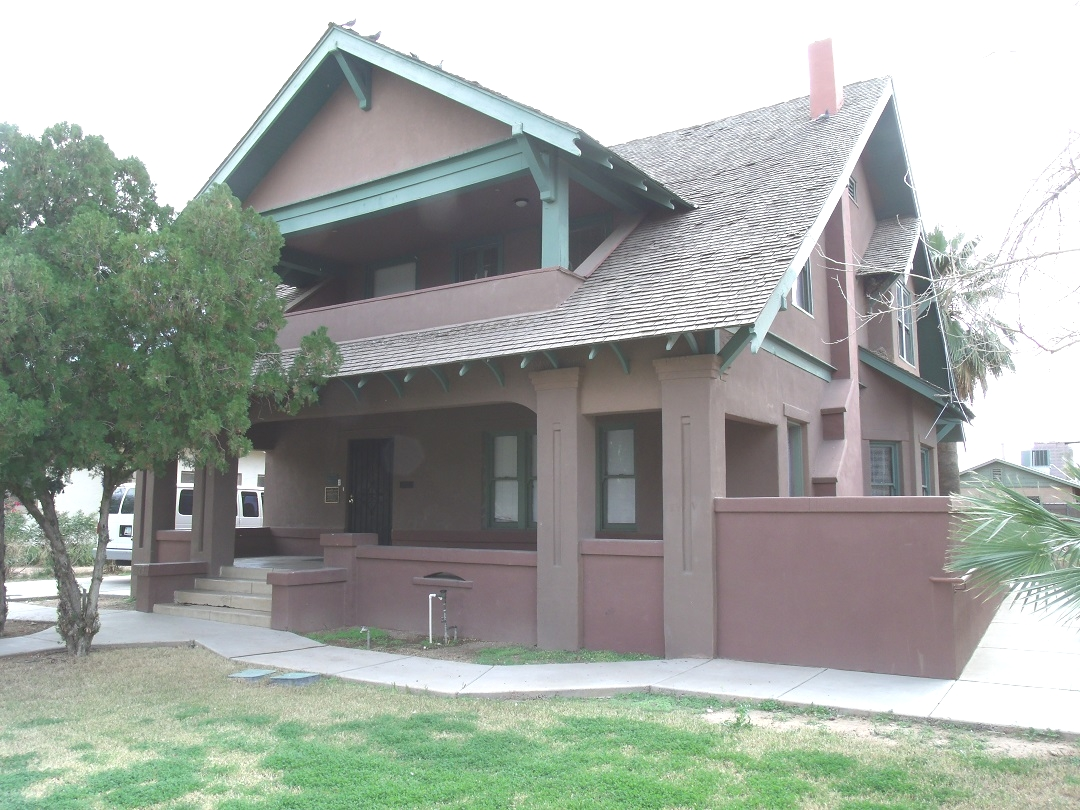
The Colonel James McClintock House was built in 1911 and is located at 323 E. Willetta St. McClintock, whose full name was "James Henry McClintock", was a veteran of the United States Army who served in the Spanish–American War. He moved to Arizona and served as state historian from 1917 through 1922. He was also one of the founders of the Arizona Republican newspaper, now The Arizona Republic. Listed in the National Register of Historic Places on October 4, 1990. Reference #90001525.

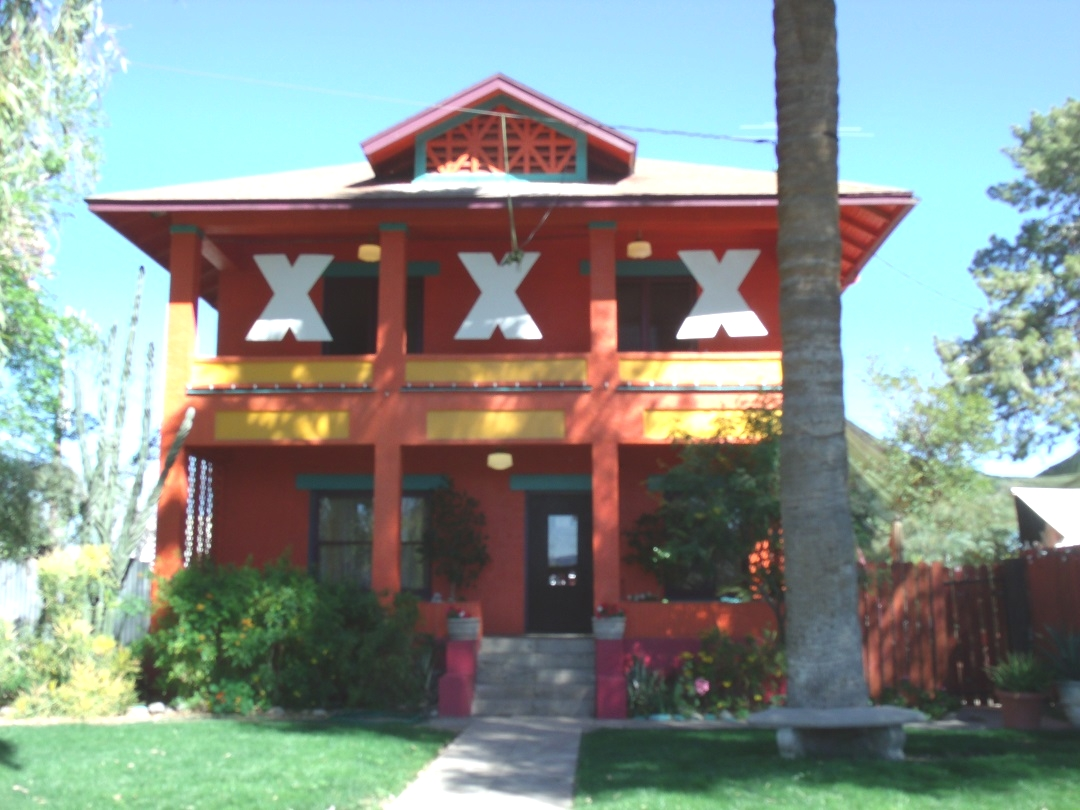
The John Seddar House was built in 1912 and is located at 1204 E. Roosevelt St. John Sedler built this home on five acres, and it looked out on alfalfa fields and a silo to the south of Roosevelt Street. It is now home to the "Alwun House", an alternative art gallery. It was listed in the Phoenix Historic Property Register.

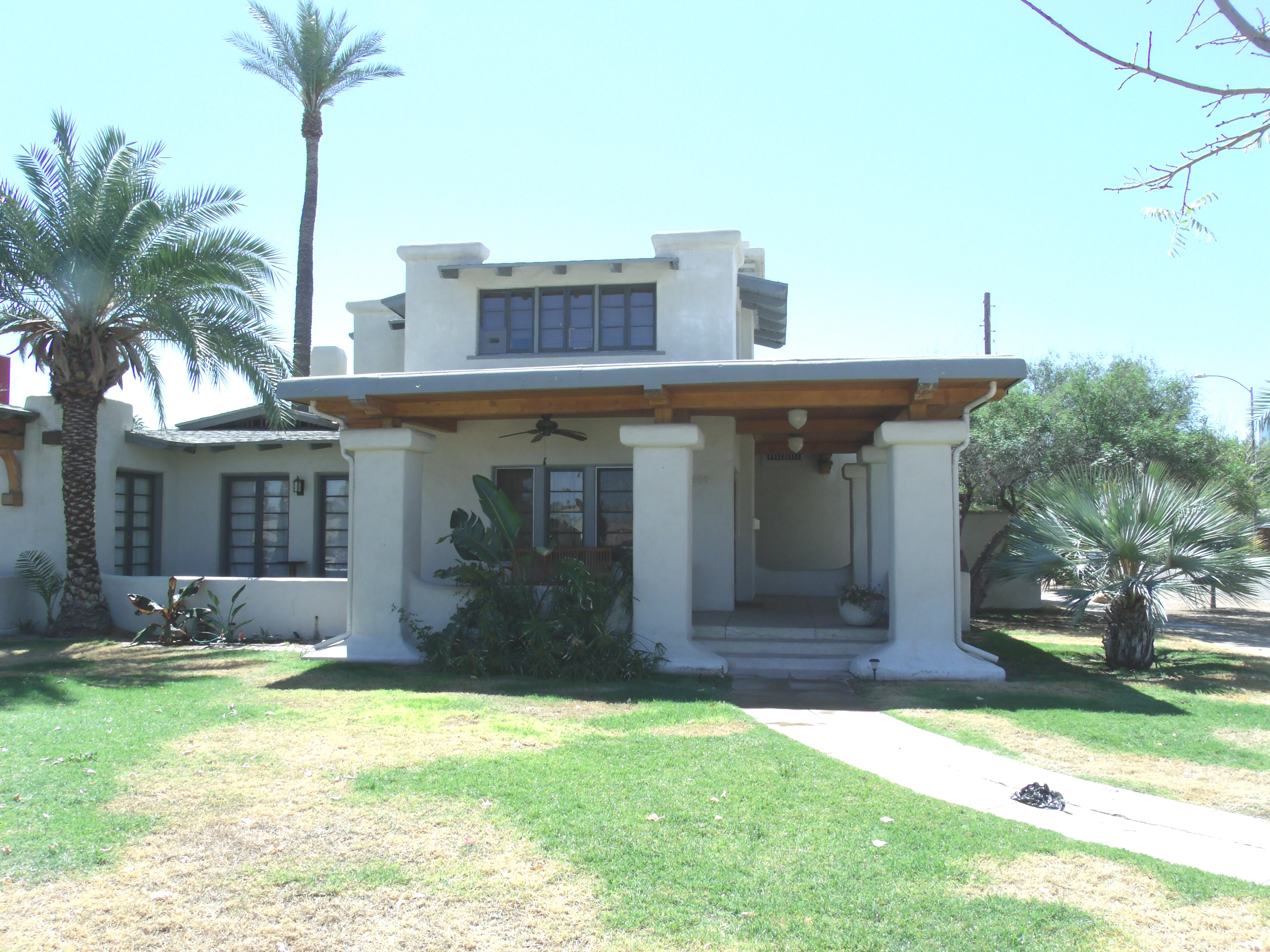
The Harry M. Fennemore House was built in 1912 and is located at 501 E. Moreland St. It was listed in the Phoenix Historic Property Register in September 2004.

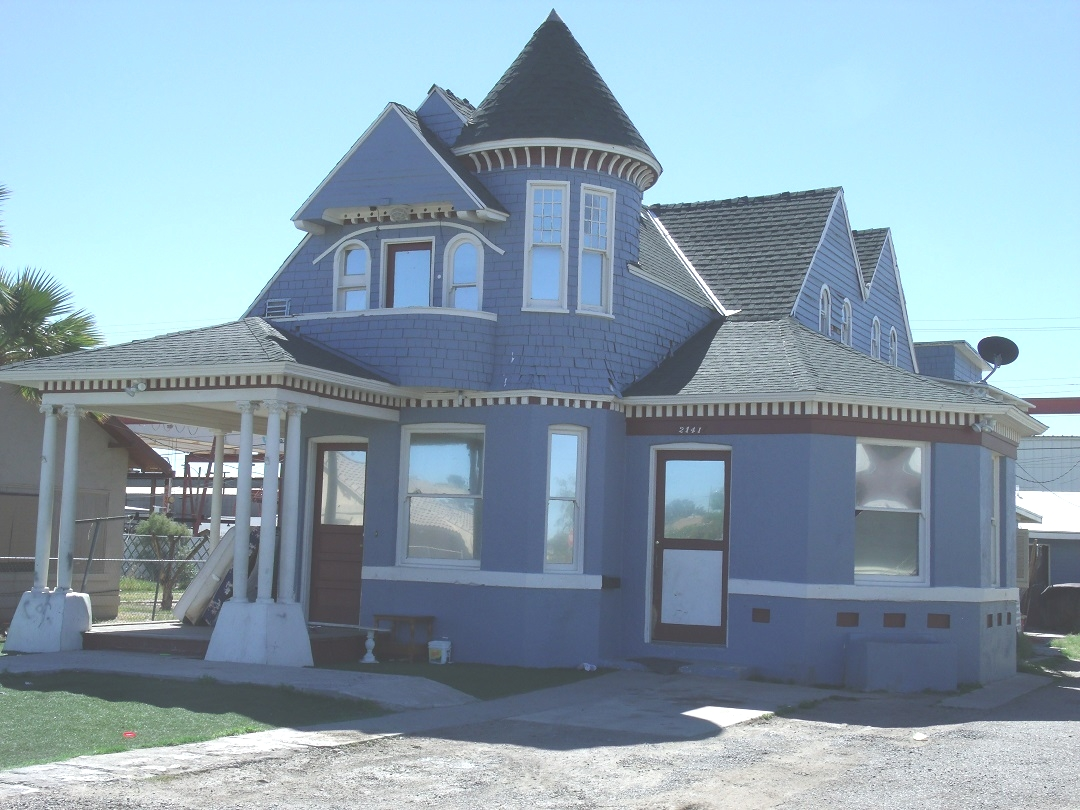
The Morse-Kelley House was built in 1912 and is located at 2141 W. Madison St. The house takes its name from Menzo Morse, a grocer, and Dorrian Kelley, a salesman for the Standard Oil Co., each of whom lived there for a time. Designated as a landmark with Historic Preservation-Landmark (HP-L) overlay zoning. It was listed in the Phoenix Historic Property Register.

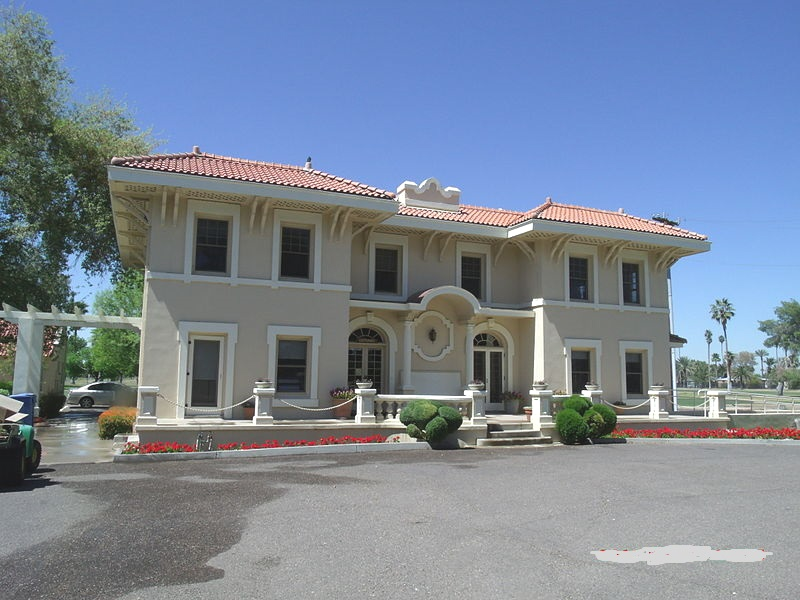
The Dr. Norton House was built in 1912 and is located at 2700 N. 15th Avenue. Dr. James C. Norton and his wife Clara Tufts moved to Phoenix from Iowa and served as territorial veterinarian.

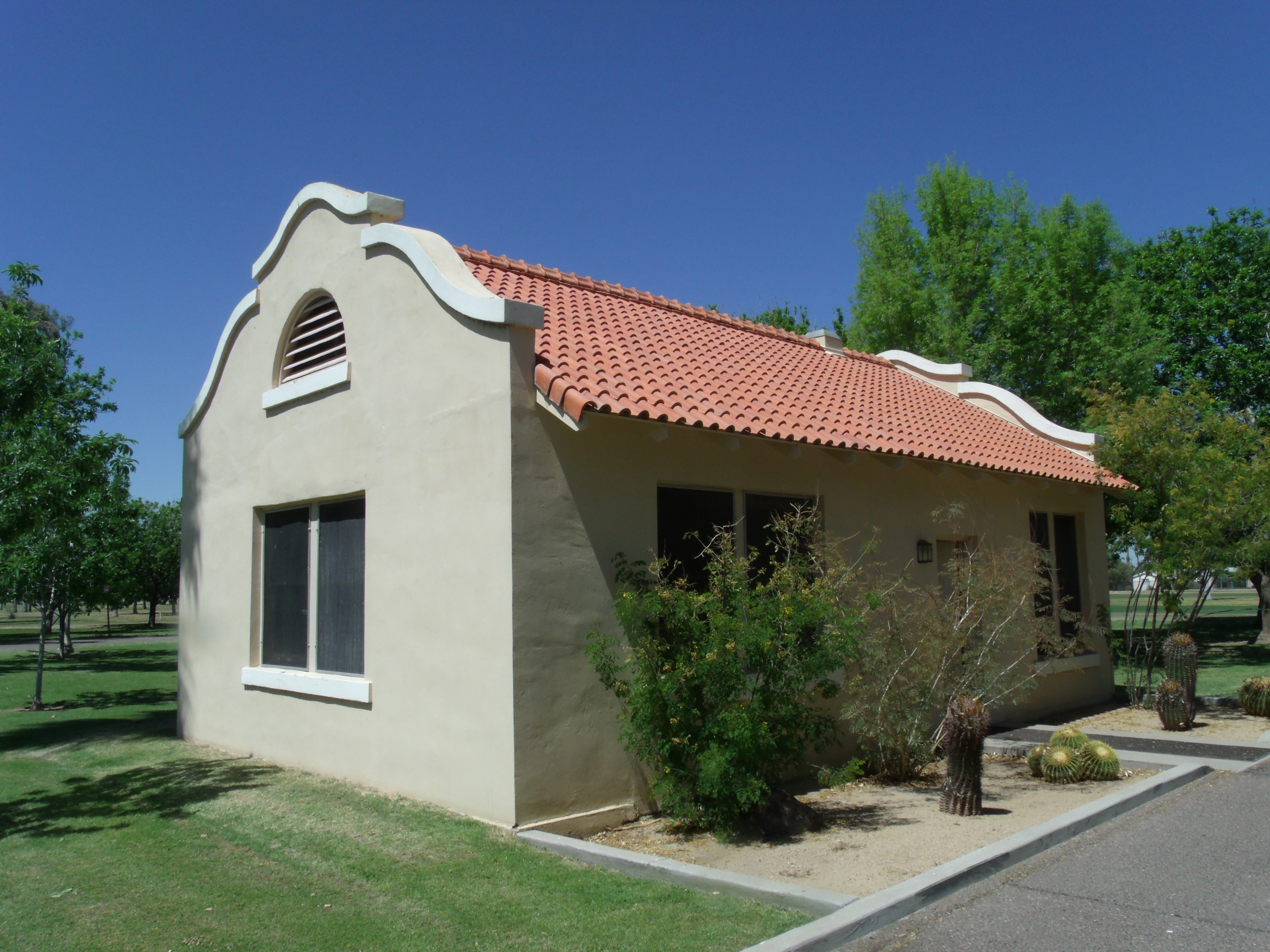
Dr. Norton's Carriage House was built in 1912 and is located at 2700 N. 15th Avenue. It was listed in the Phoenix Historic Property Register.

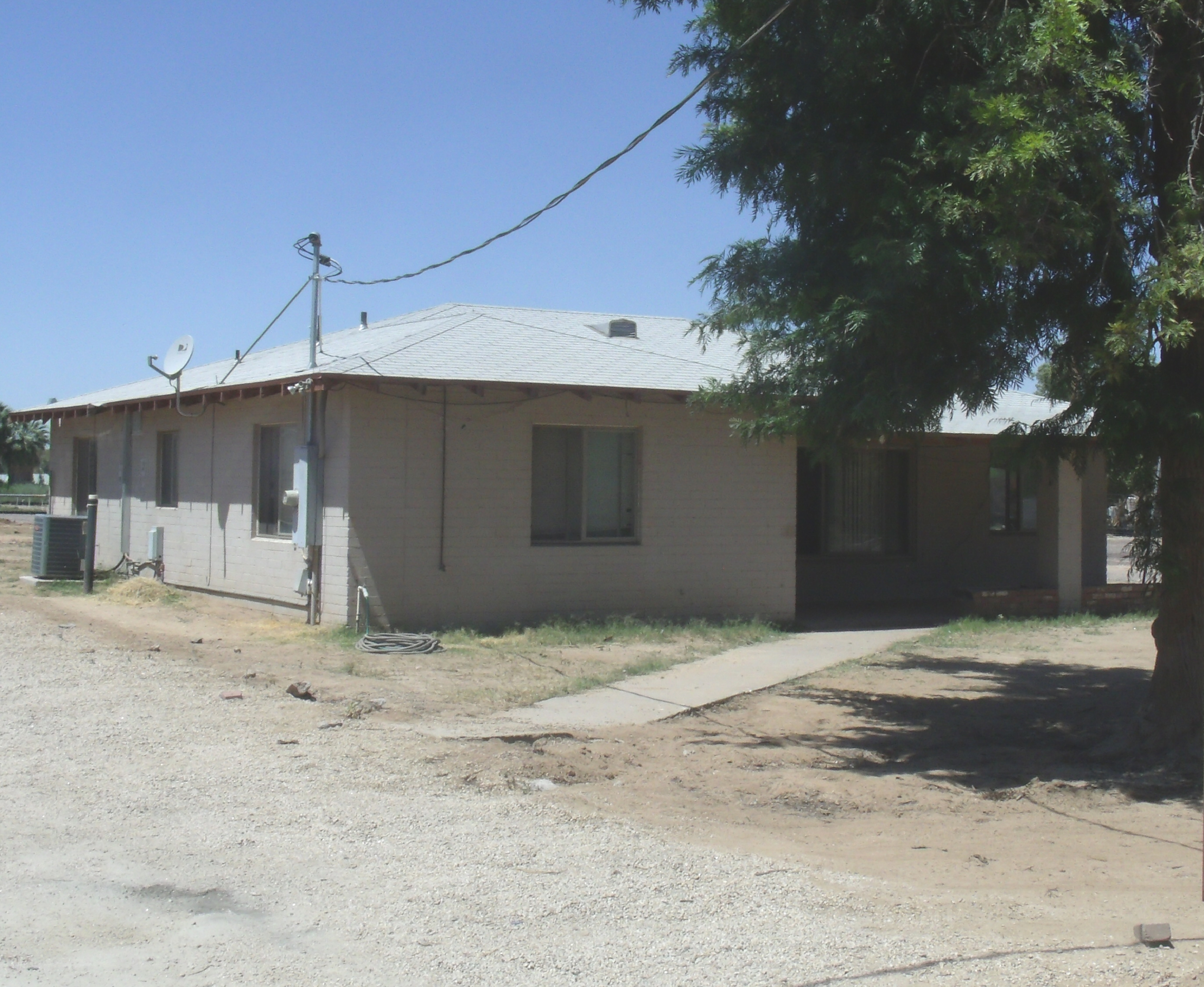
The houses in Sierra Vista were built in 1913 and are located at 6802 S. 28th Street. They were listed in the Phoenix Historic Property Register in March 1993.

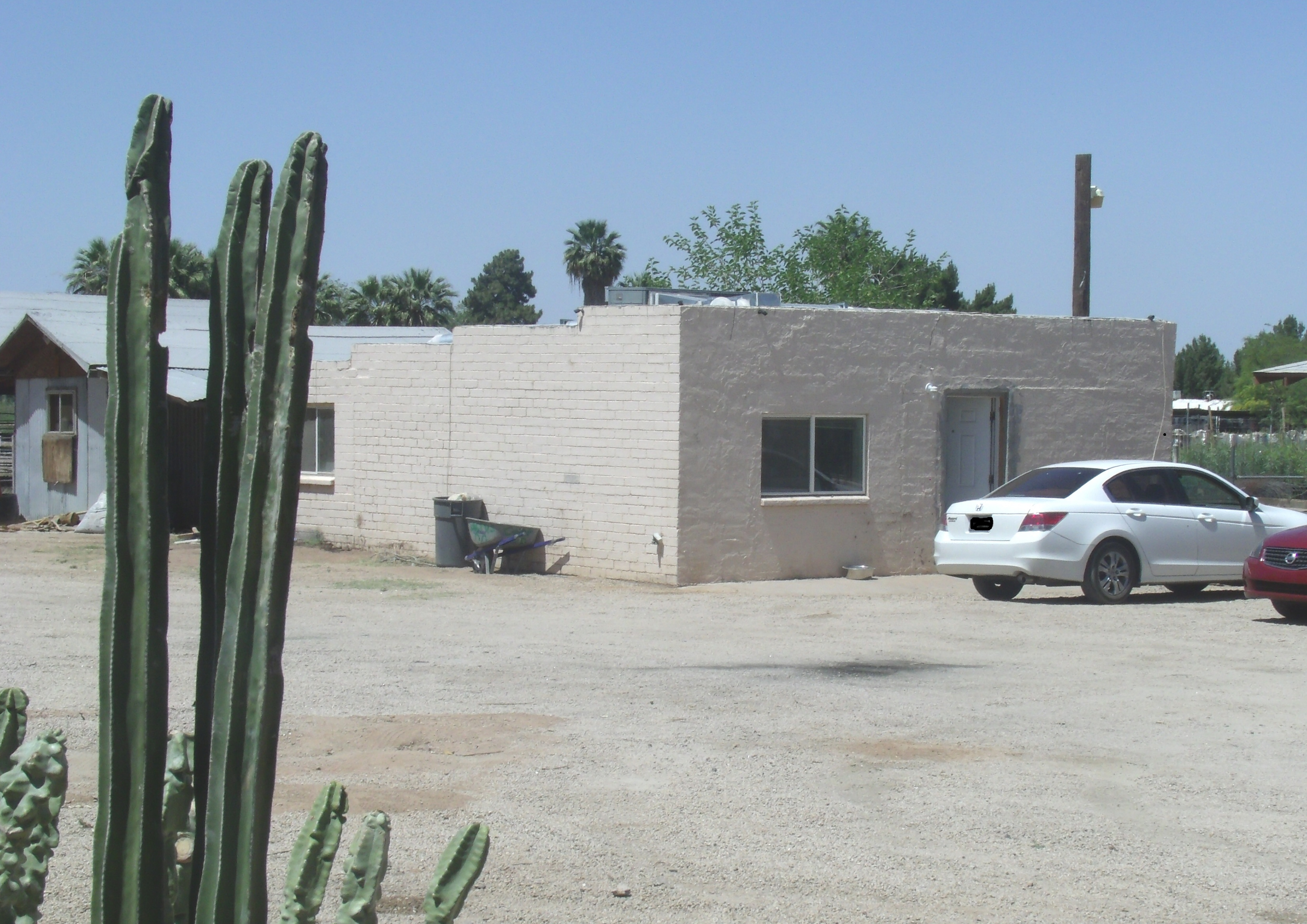
The houses in Sierra Vista were built in 1913 and are located at 6802 S. 28th Street. They were listed in the Phoenix Historic Property Register in March 1993.

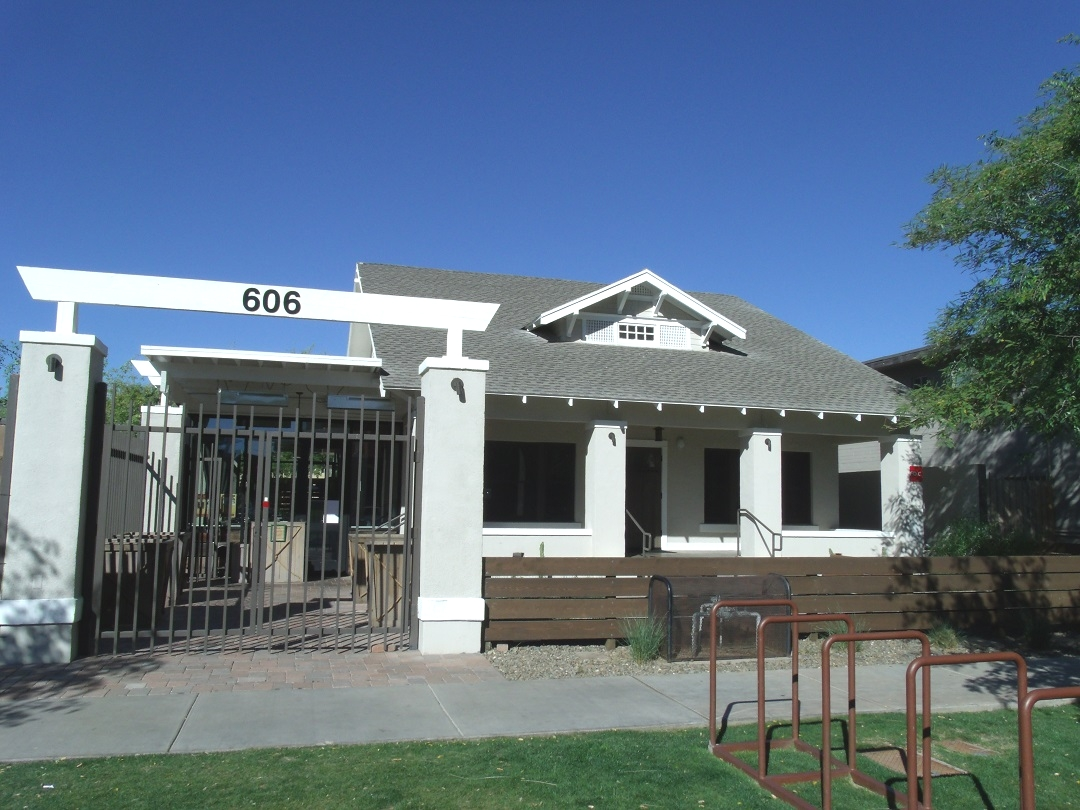
The William E. Cavness House was built in 1914 and is located at 606 N. 4th Avenue. William E. Cavness built this Craftsman Bungalow style house for his bride, Nettie. It was listed in the National Register of Historic Places on November 3, 2001, reference #01001191.

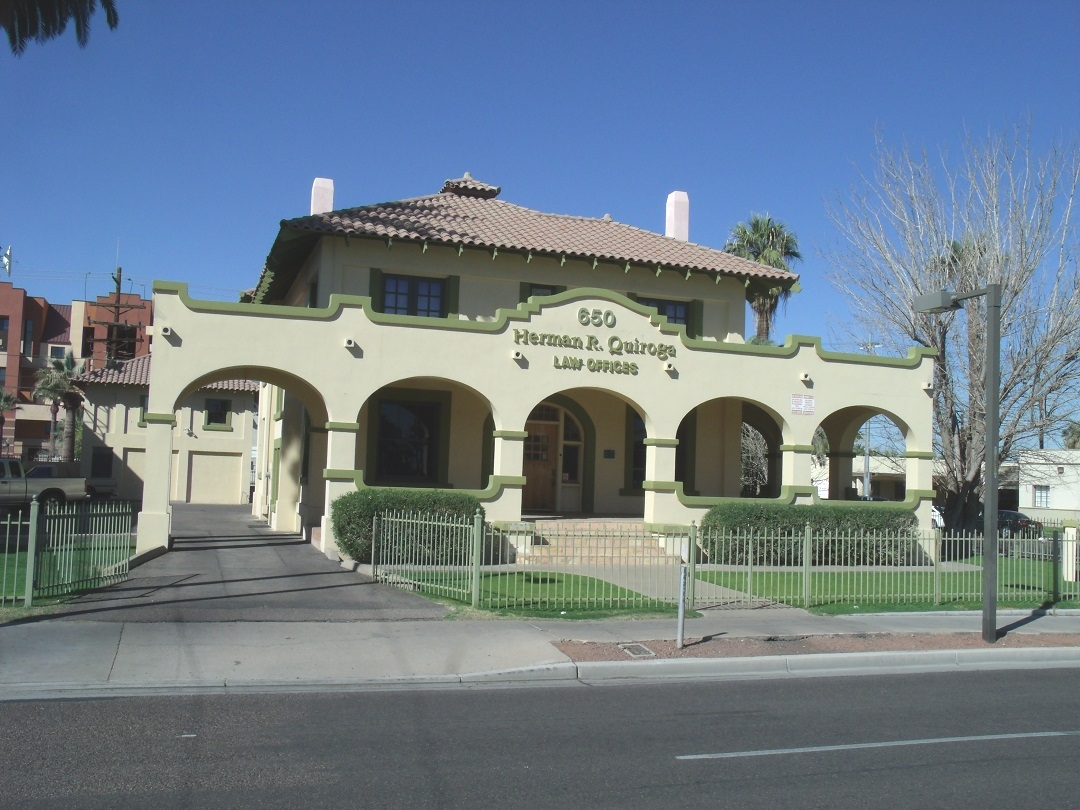
The Charles Dunlap House was built in 1914 and is located at 650 N. 1st. Avenue. This was the house of Charles Dunlap founder of the People's Ice and Fuel Company and the Phoenix Wood and Coal Company and listed in the National Register of Historic Places on November 30, 1983, reference #83003466. Designated as a landmark with Historic Preservation-Landmark (HP-L) overlay zoning. The structure is now occupied by a local law firm.

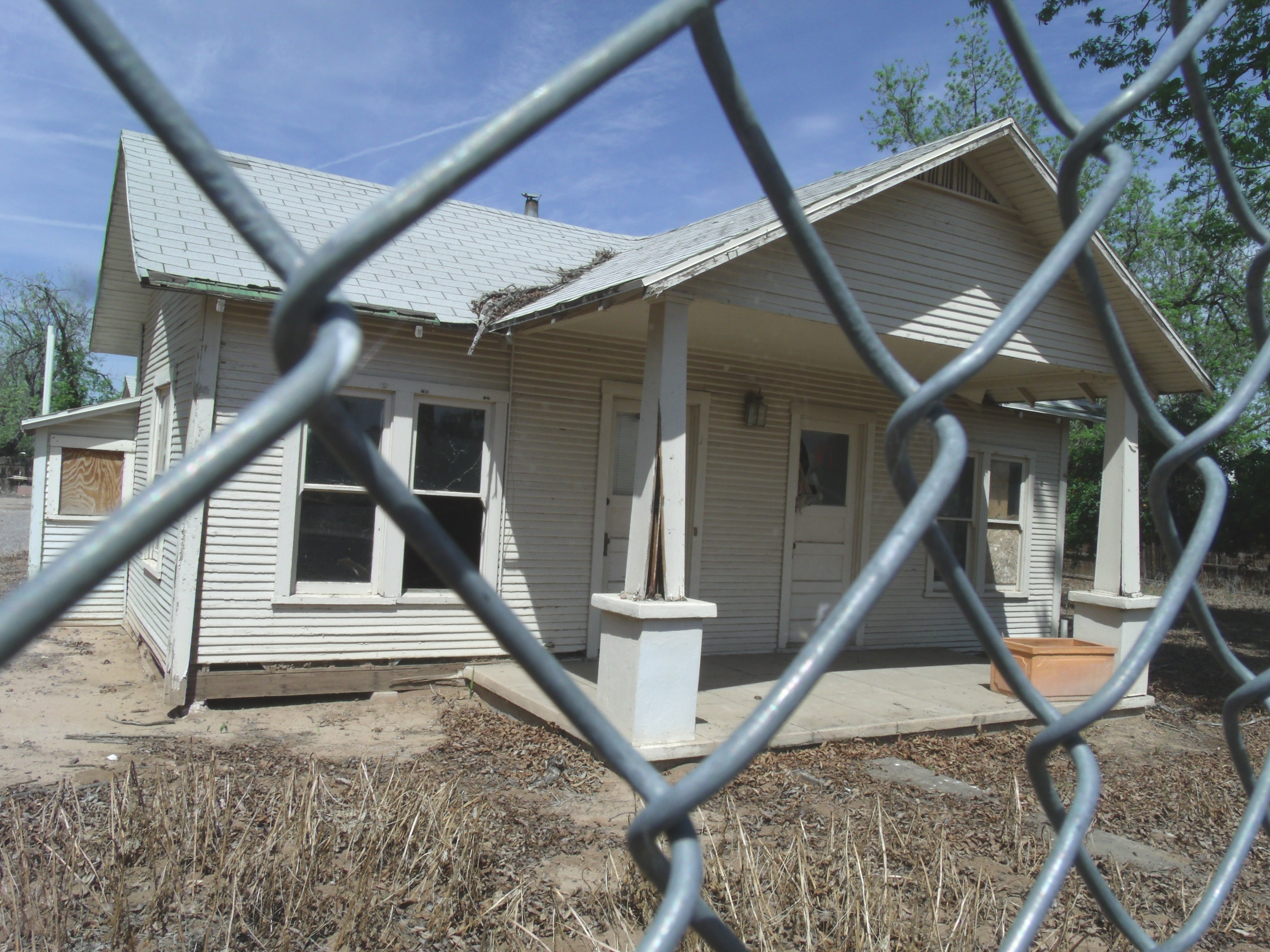
The Vernacular Farm Residence was built in 1915 and is located at 2956 E. Southern Avenue. The property was listed in the Phoenix Historic Property Register in September 1993.

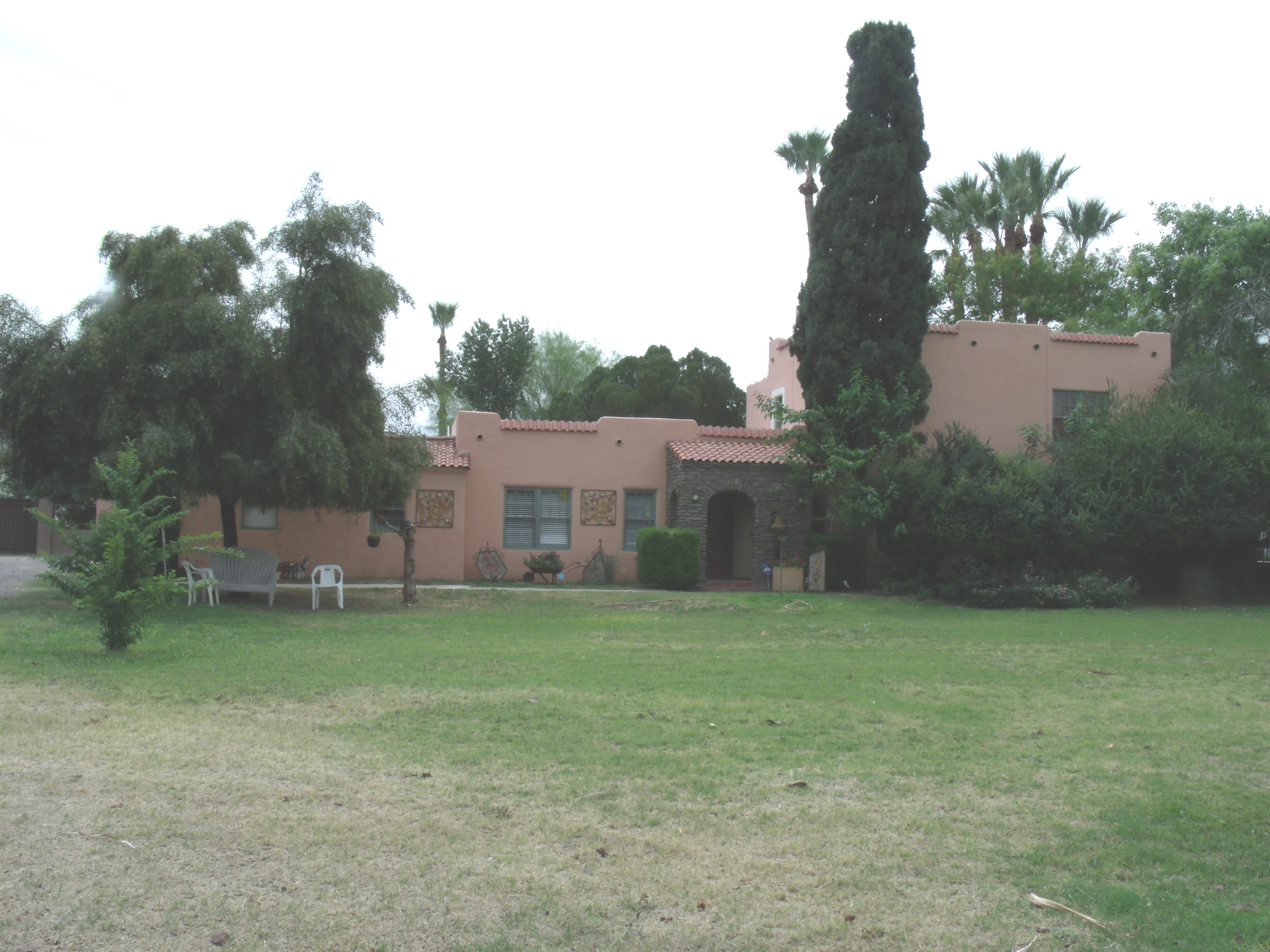
The Spanish Colonial Revival Residence located at 333 E. Carter Road was built in 1916. It was listed in the Phoenix Historic Property Register in July 1993.

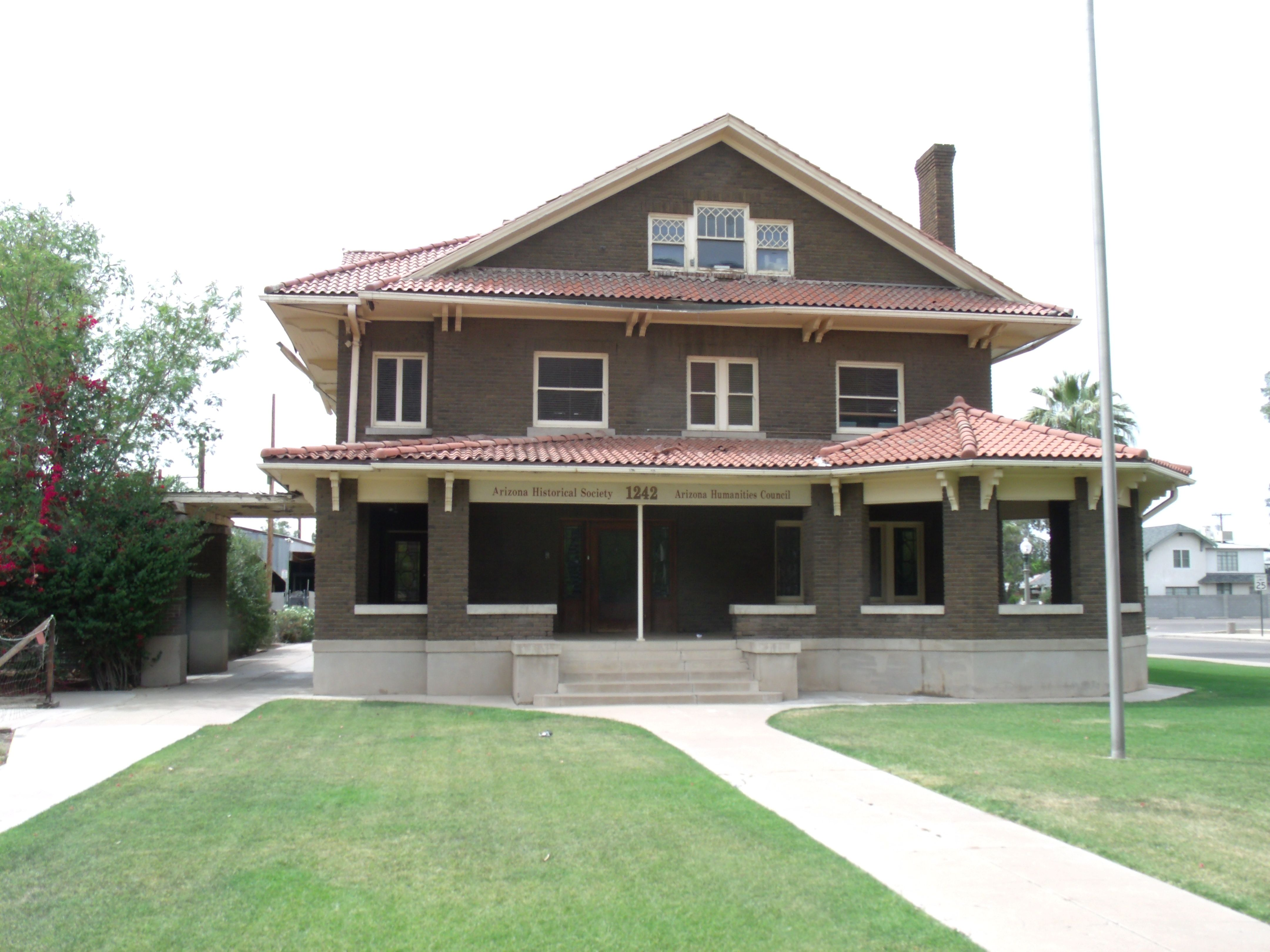
The Dr. Ellis-Shackelfield House was built in 1917 and is located at 1242 N. Central Avenue. On November 30, 1983, the house was listed in the National Register of Historic Places, ref.: #83003475.

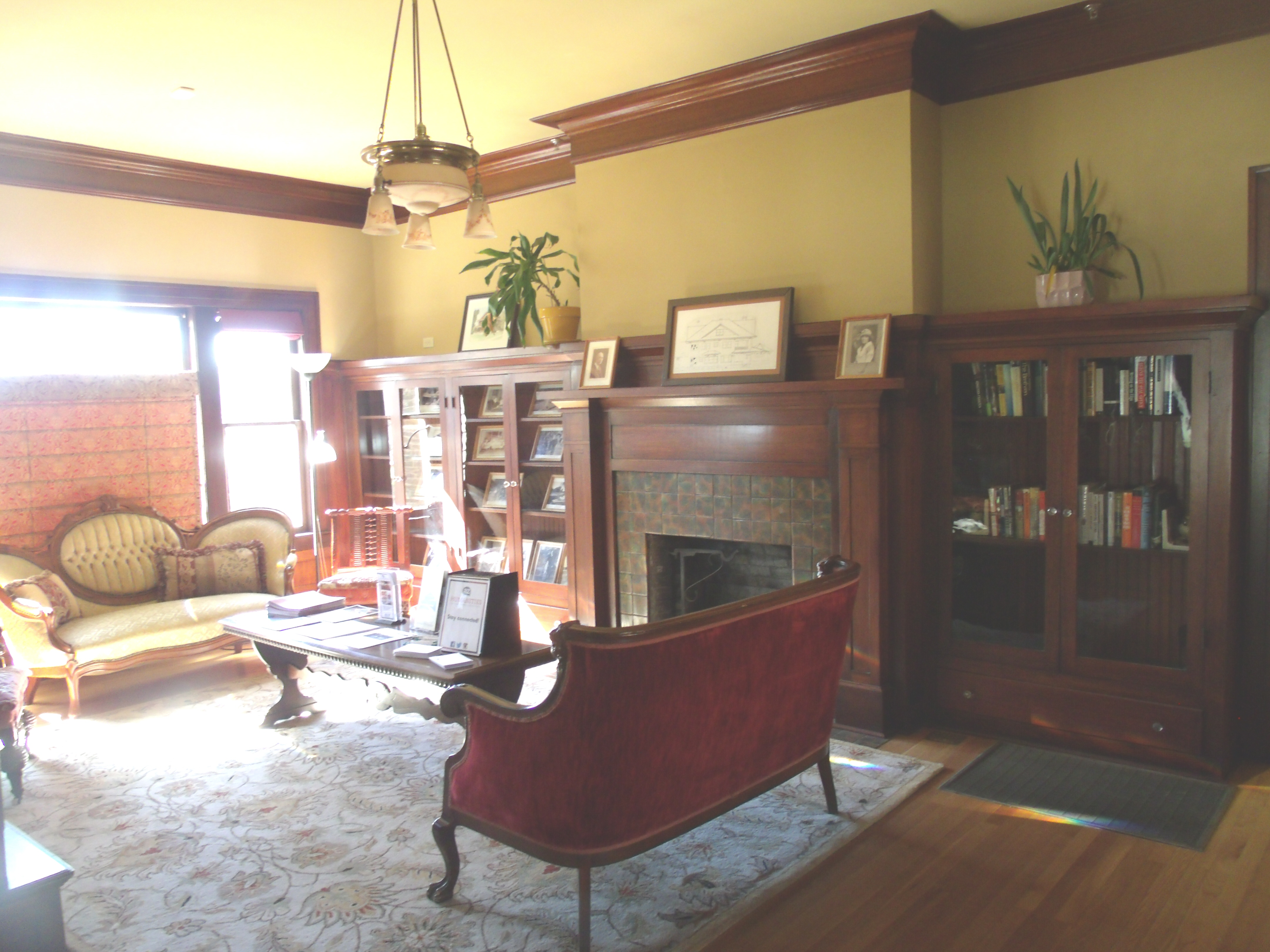
The living room of the Dr. Ellis Shackelford House. The house was built in 1917 and is located in 1242 Central Avenue. On November 30, 1983, the house was listed in the National Register of Historic Places, ref.: #83003475.

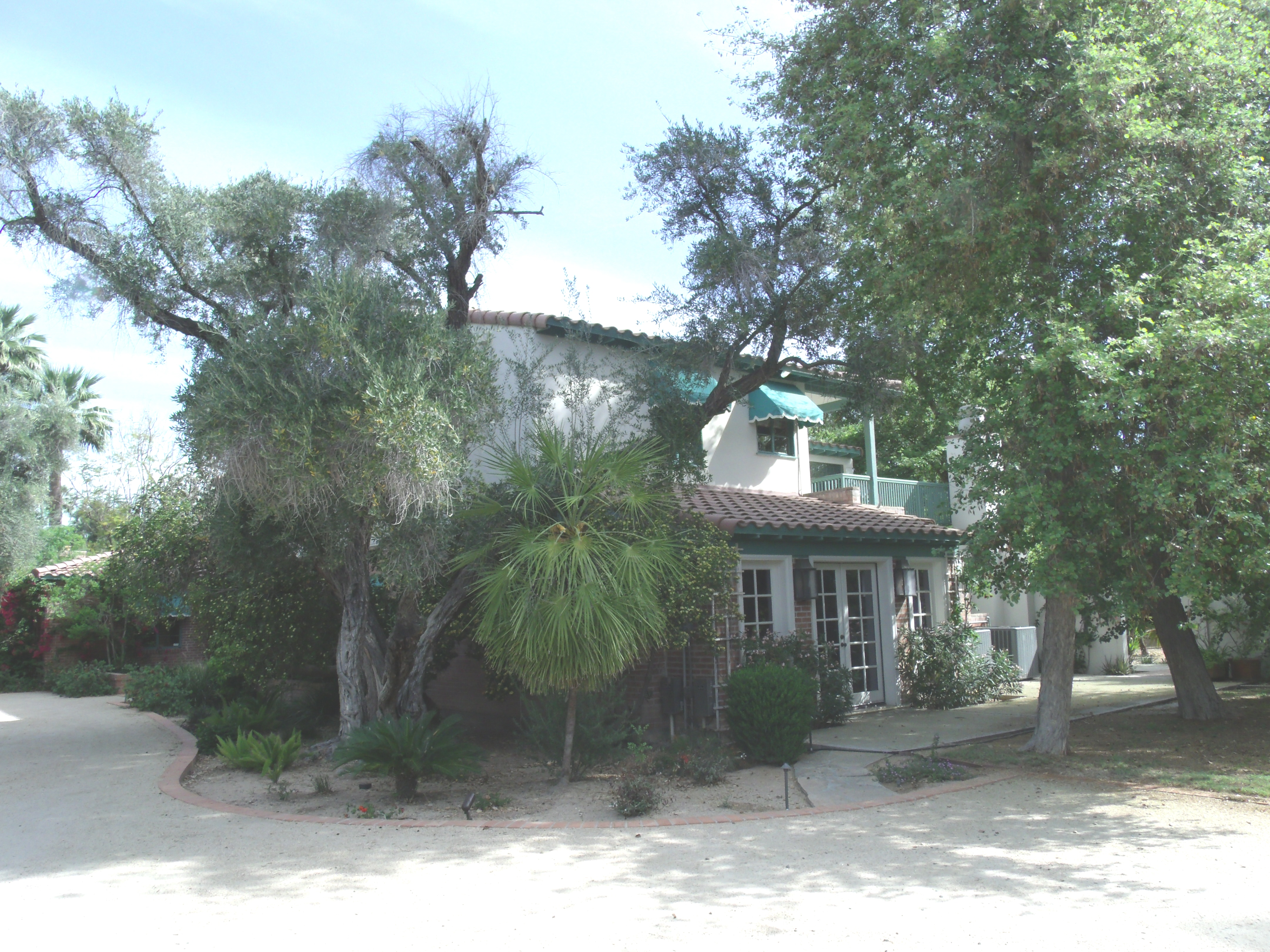
The Dension Kitchel House was built in 1918 and is located at 2912 E. Sherran Lane. It was listed in the National Register of Historic Places on May 19, 1994, reference #94000448.

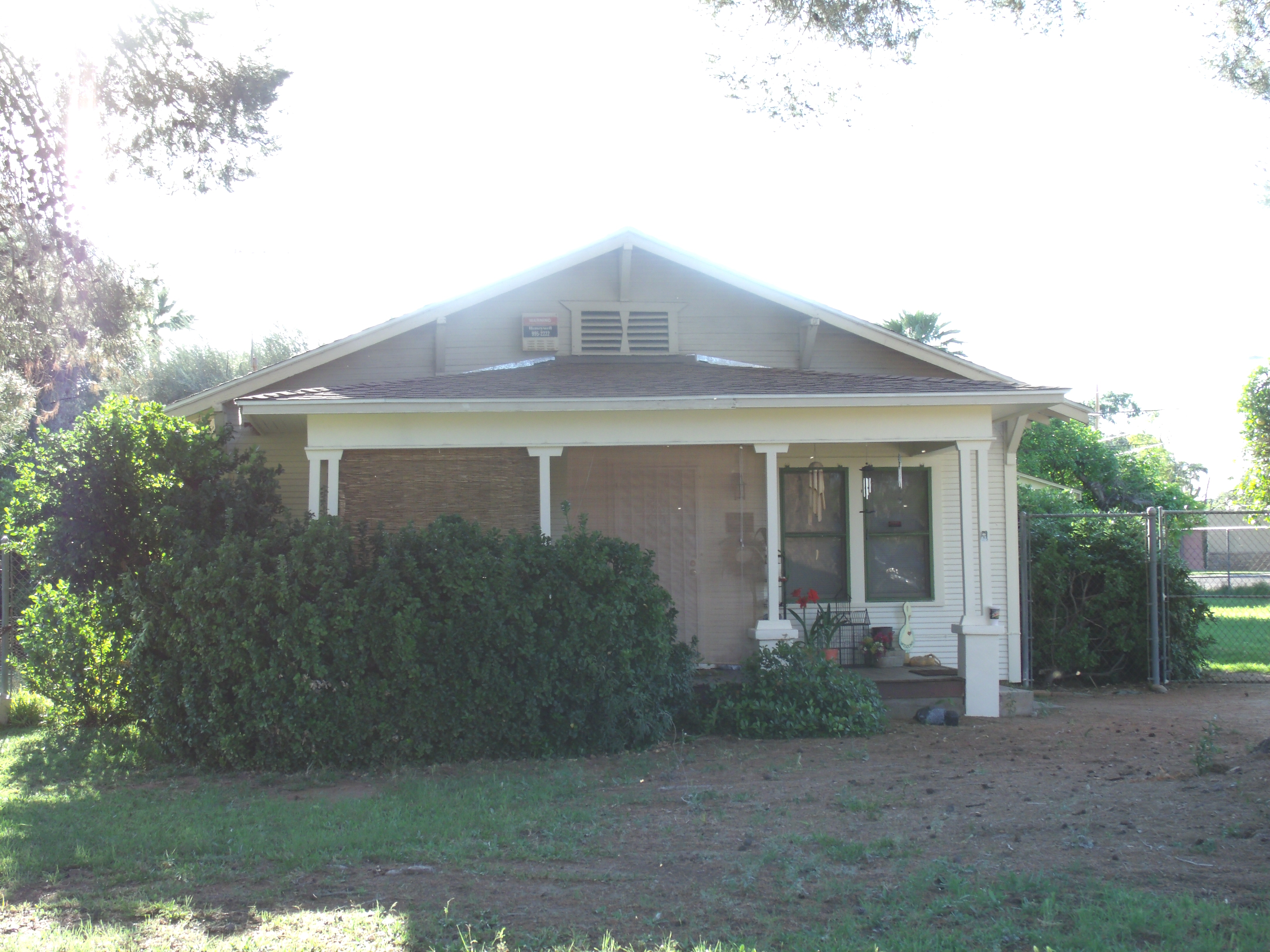
The Kaler House was built in 1918 and is located at 301 W. Frier Dr. It was listed in the National Register of Historic Places on December 17, 1992, reference #92001686.

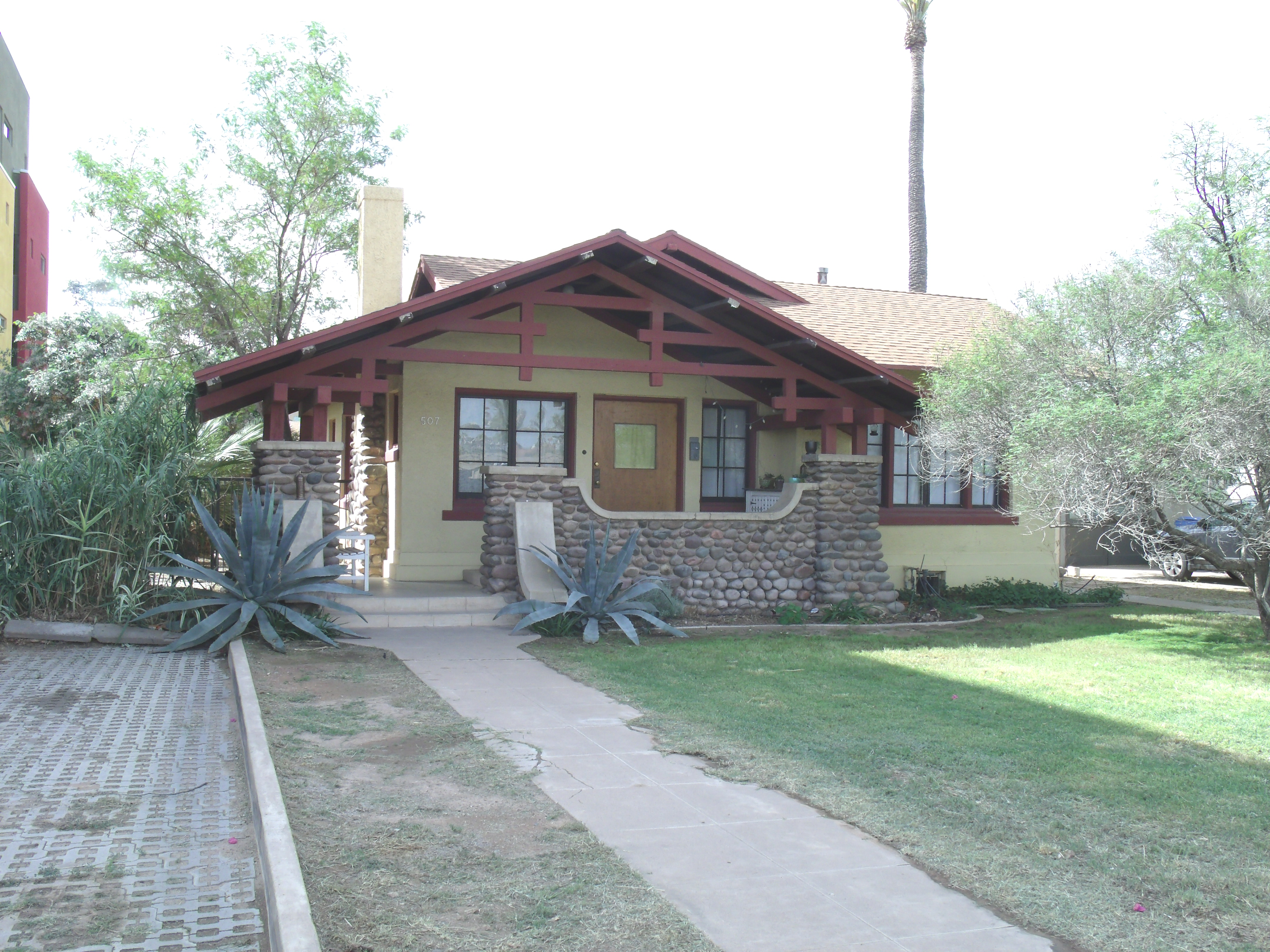
The Guy P. Nevitt House was built in 1919 and is located at 507 E. Moreland St. It was listed in the Phoenix Historic Property Register in September 2004.

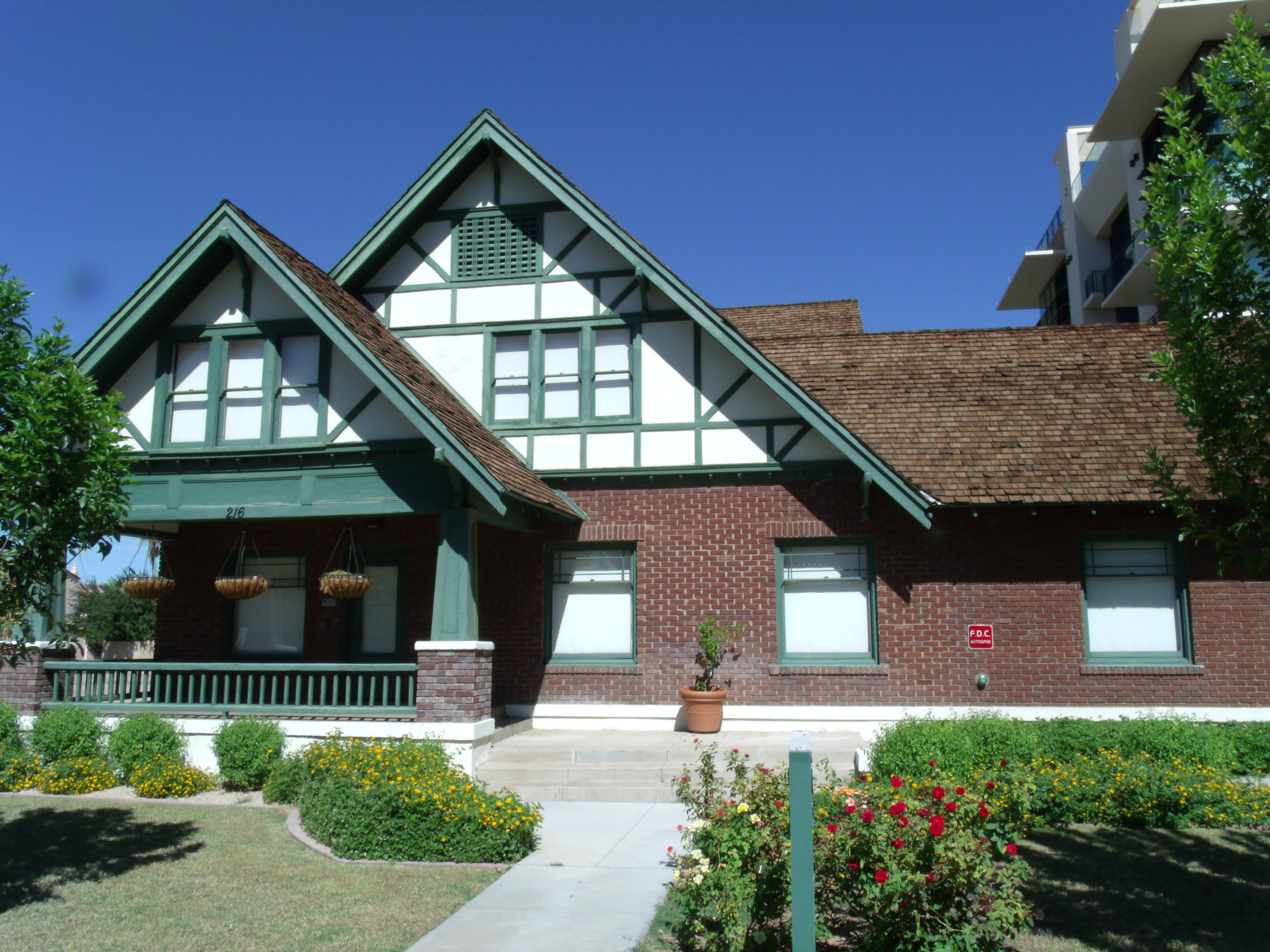
The Winship House built in 1919 and is located at 216 W. Portland Avenue, Phoenix. It was built for Dr. Welter D. Schackelford and in 1923 sold to Fred Winship. The house is listed in the Phoenix Historic Property Register.

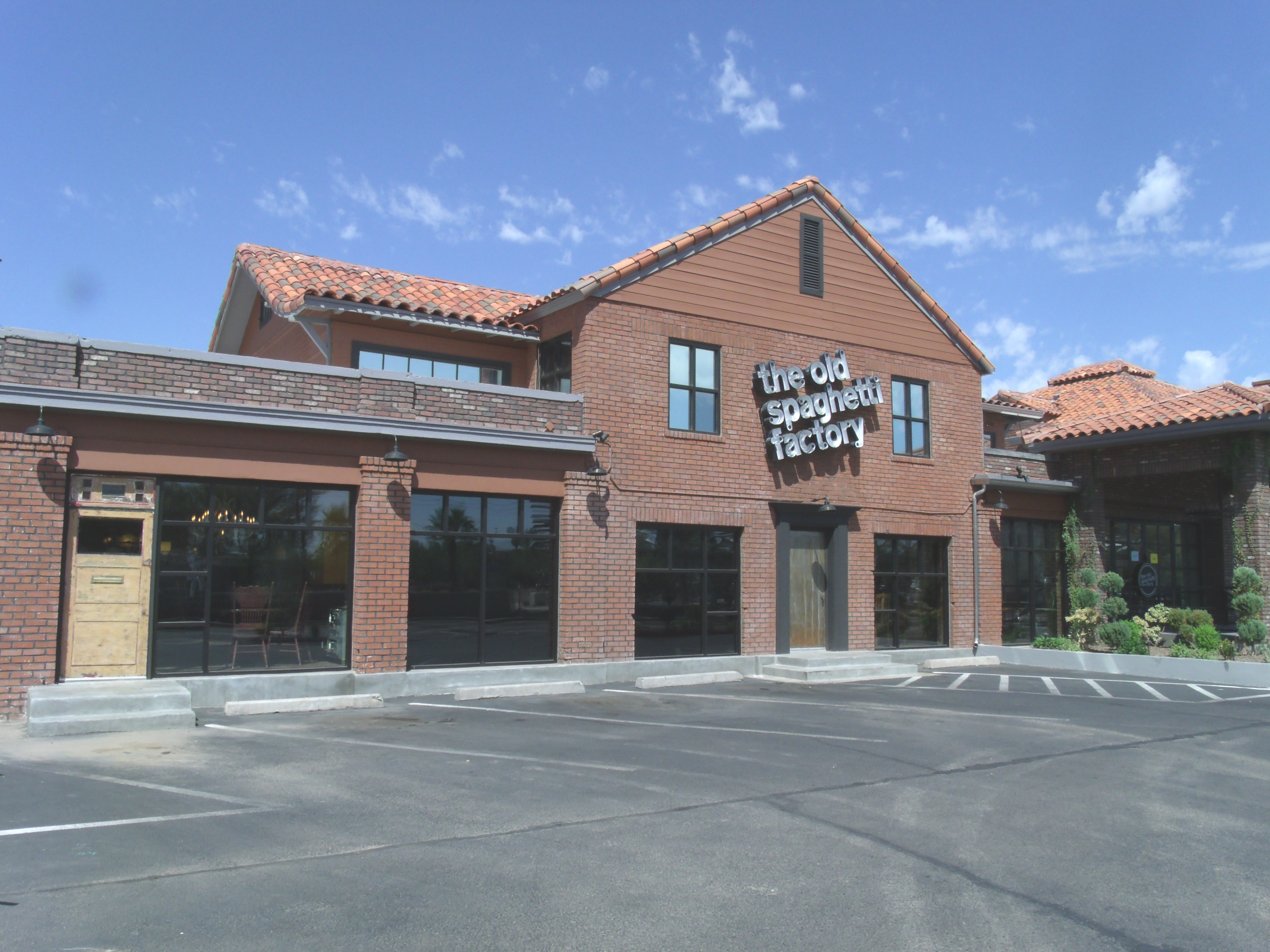
The Baker House was built in the 1920s and is located at 1418 N. Central Avenue. It is listed as Historic by the Phoenix Historic Property Register.

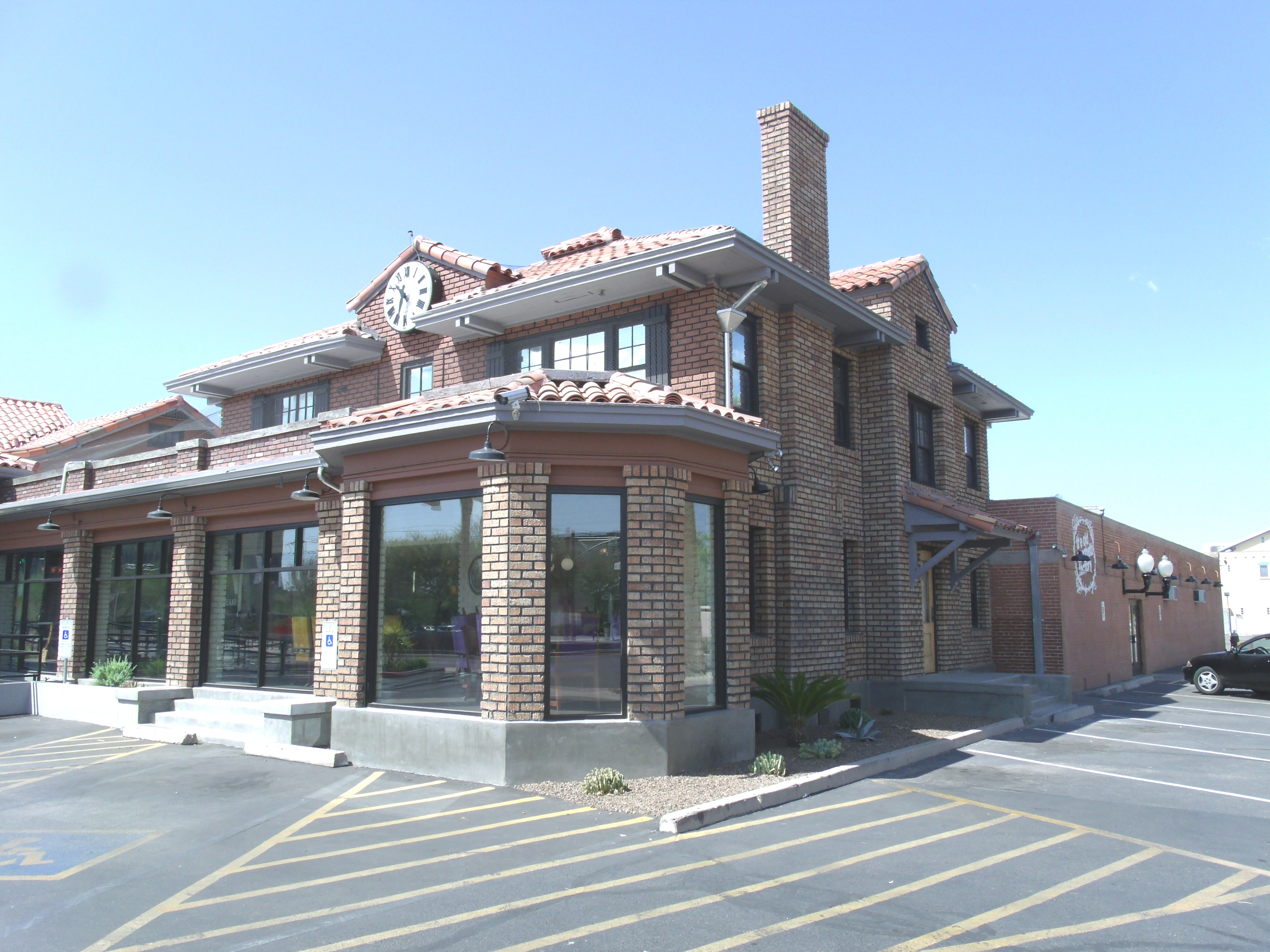
The Cole Mansion was built in the 1920s and is located at 1418 N. Central Avenue. It is listed as Historic by the Phoenix Historic Property Register.

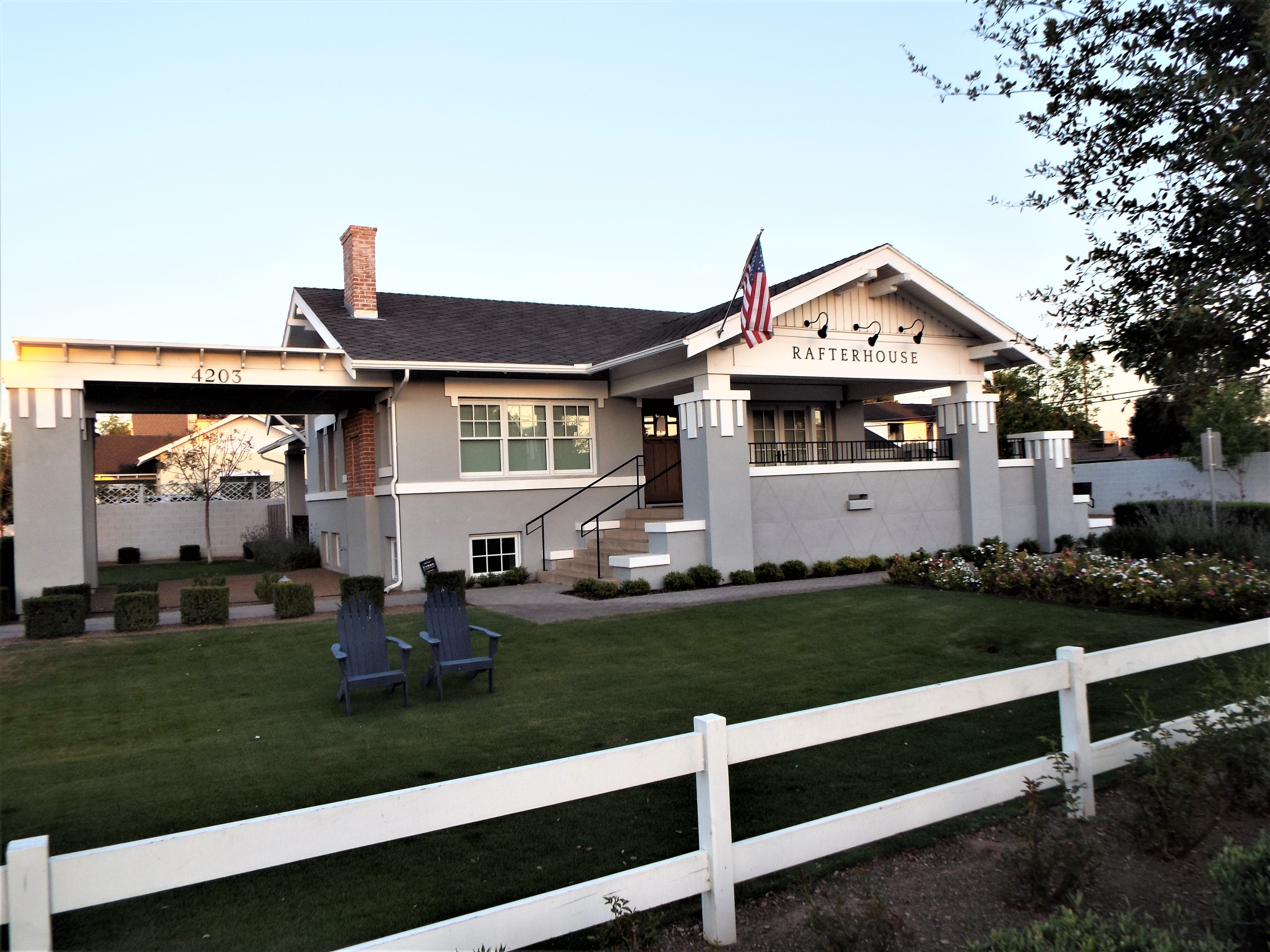
The Frank and Emma Avery House was built in 1920 and is located at 4203 North 44th St. It was listed in the National Register of Historic Places on June 25, 2020; reference: #100005297

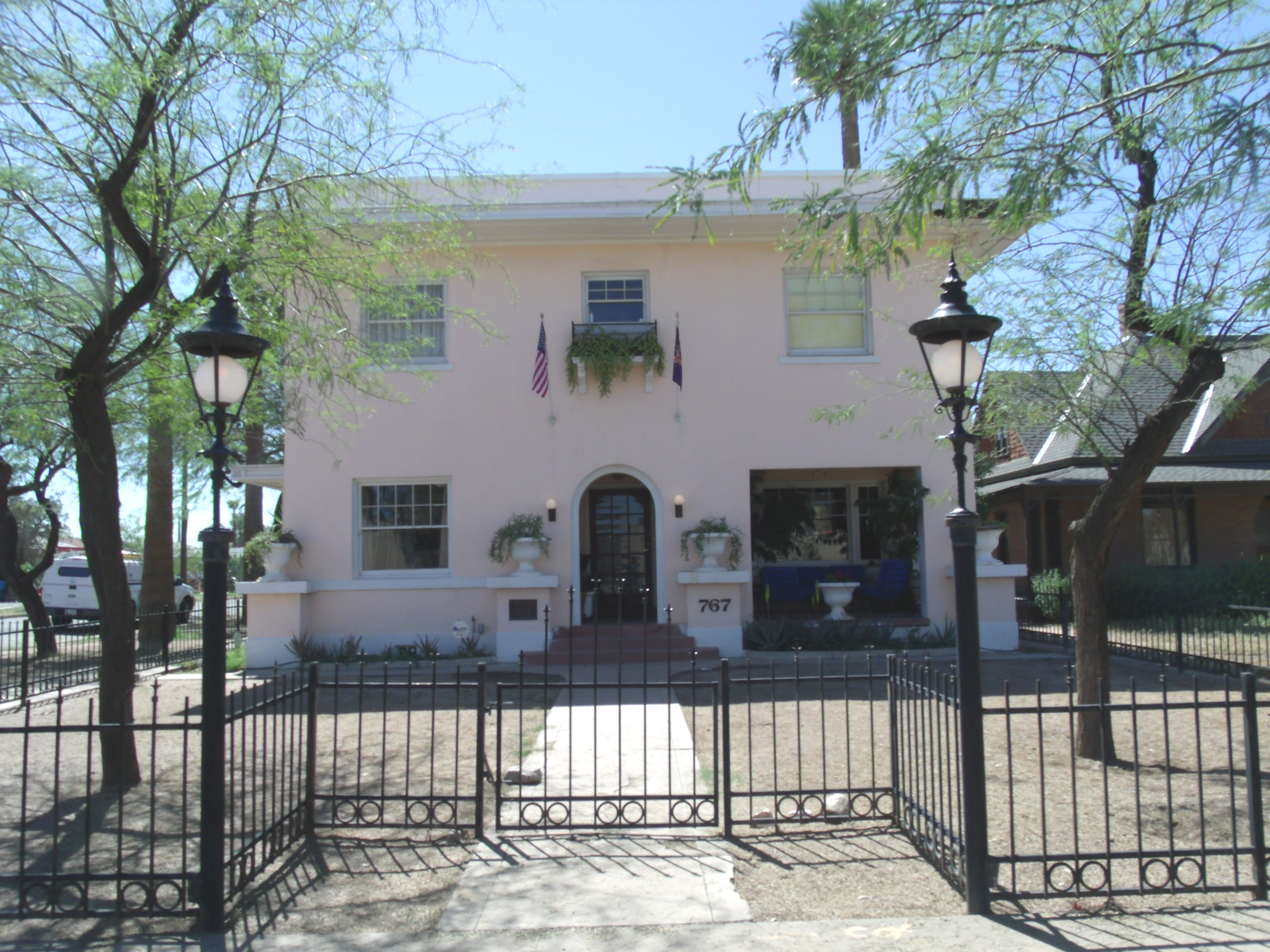
The Pieri-Elliot House was built in 1920 and is located at 767 E. Moreland St. It was listed in the National Register of Historic Places on December 29, 1983, reference #83003500.

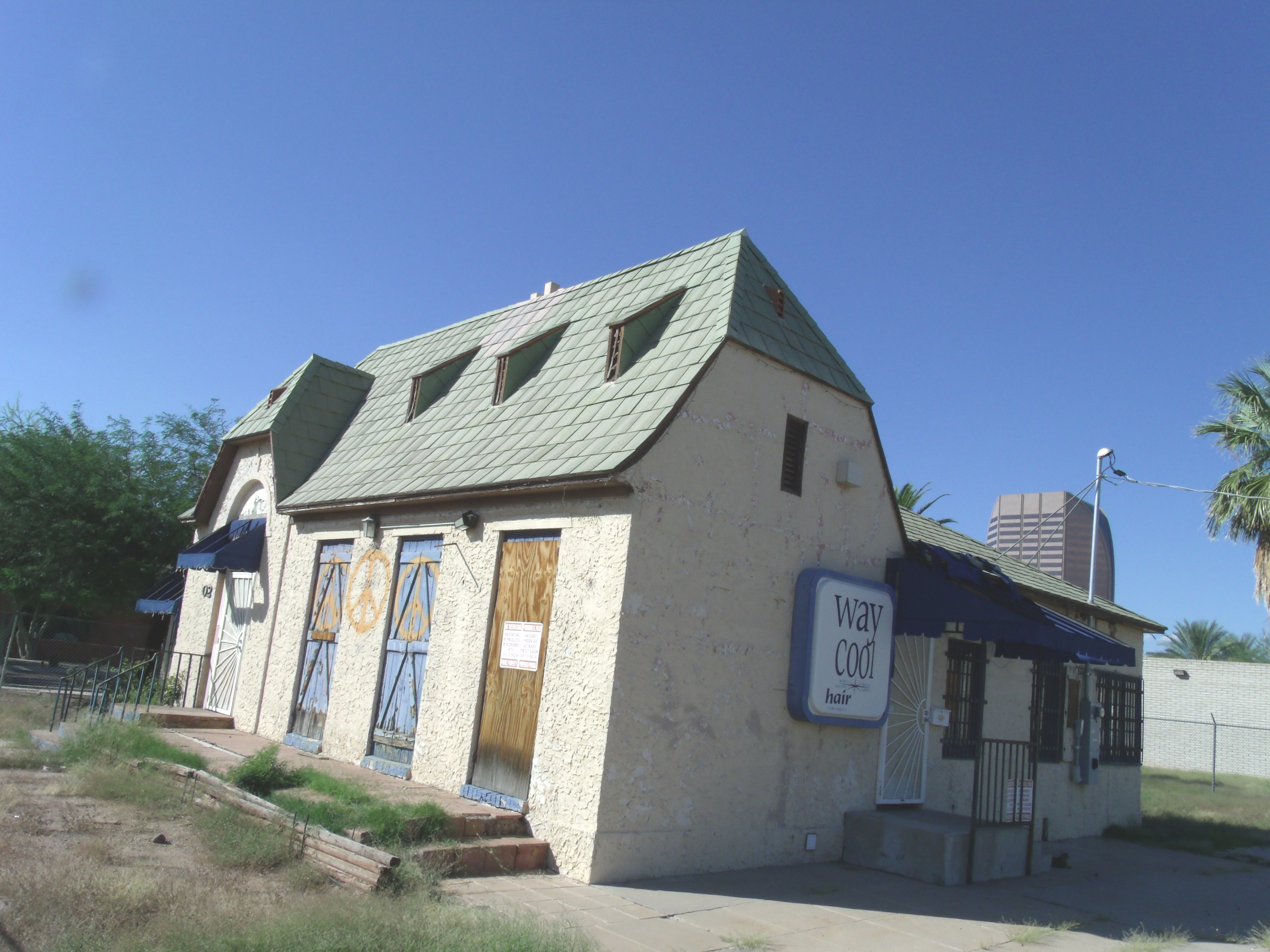
The Mrs. Neal House was built in 1920 and is located at 102 East Willetta Street. According to the local media, this house is in danger of being demolished. It is listed in the Phoenix Historic Property Register.

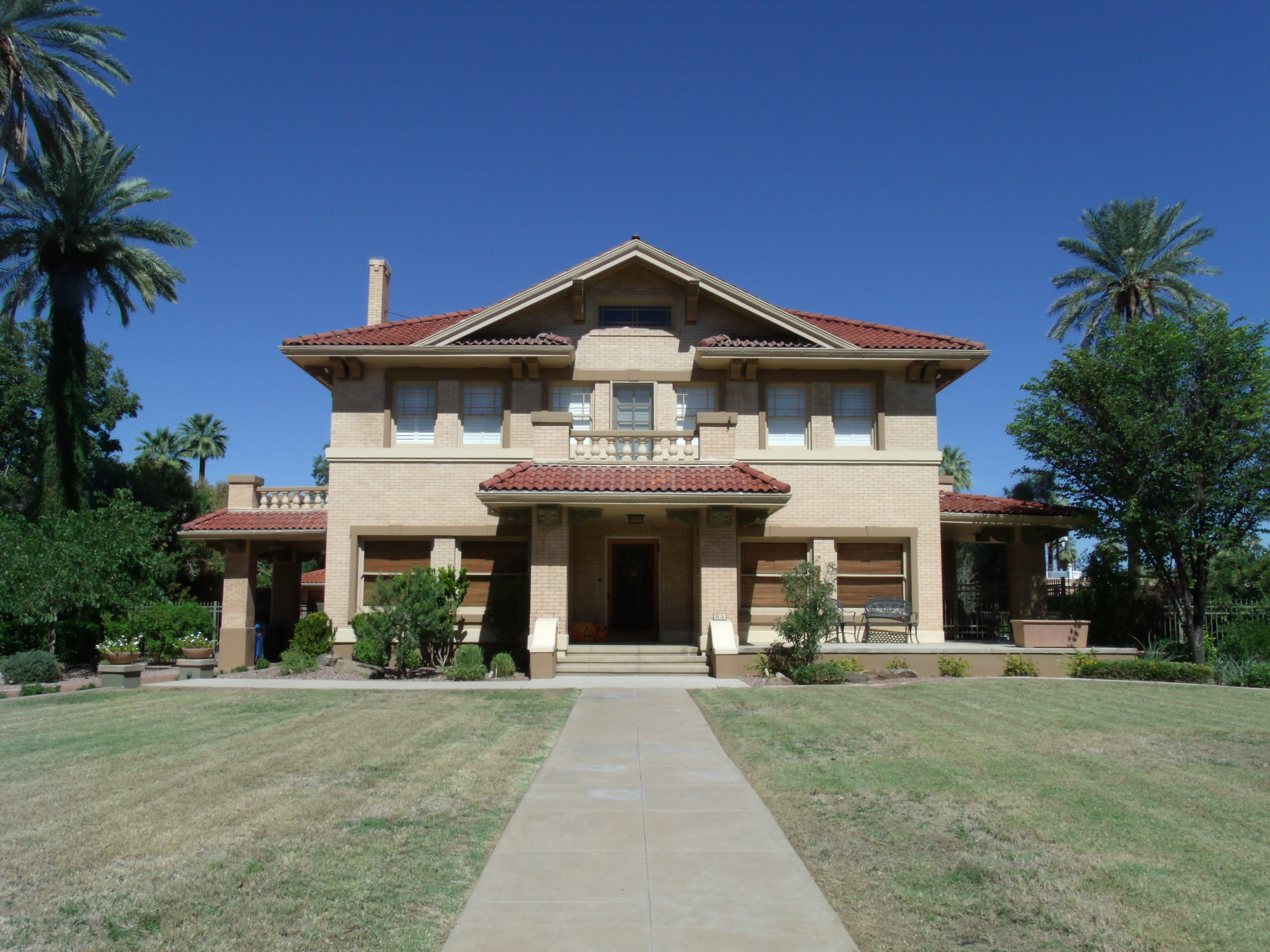
The Salim Ackel House was built in 1920 and is located at 94 E. Monte Vista Street in Phoenix. It was listed in the National Register of Historic Places in 1994, reference number 94000574.

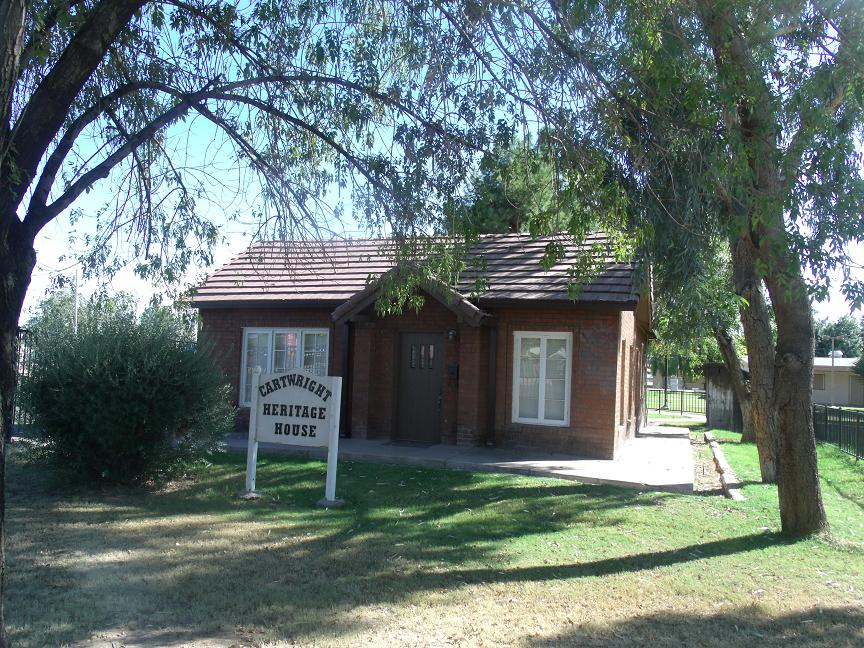
The Cartwright Heritage House together with the Cartwright School was listed in the National Register of Historic Places on August 12, 1993, ref.:#93000739. The house, which housed Mr. Glenn L. Downs in 1923, is located at 5833 W. Thomas Rd. Downs was the first superintendent of the Cartwright School Dist.

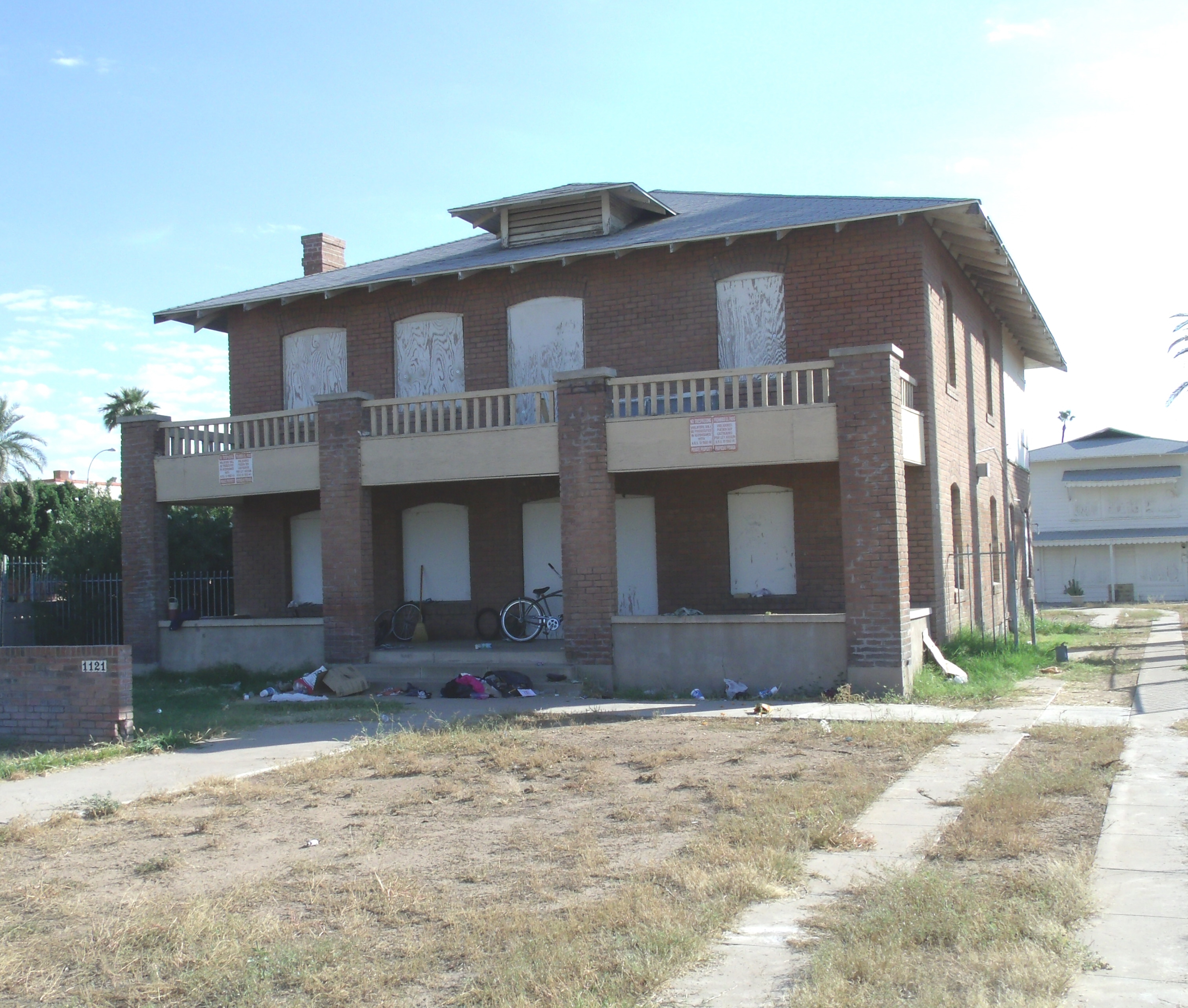
The Sarah Pemberton House was built in 1920 and is located at 1121 N. 2nd St. The house is listed in the Phoenix Historic Property Register and the National Register of Historic Places on September 5, 2017, reference #100001557. This property is considered to be an endangered historic house which someday may be demolished.

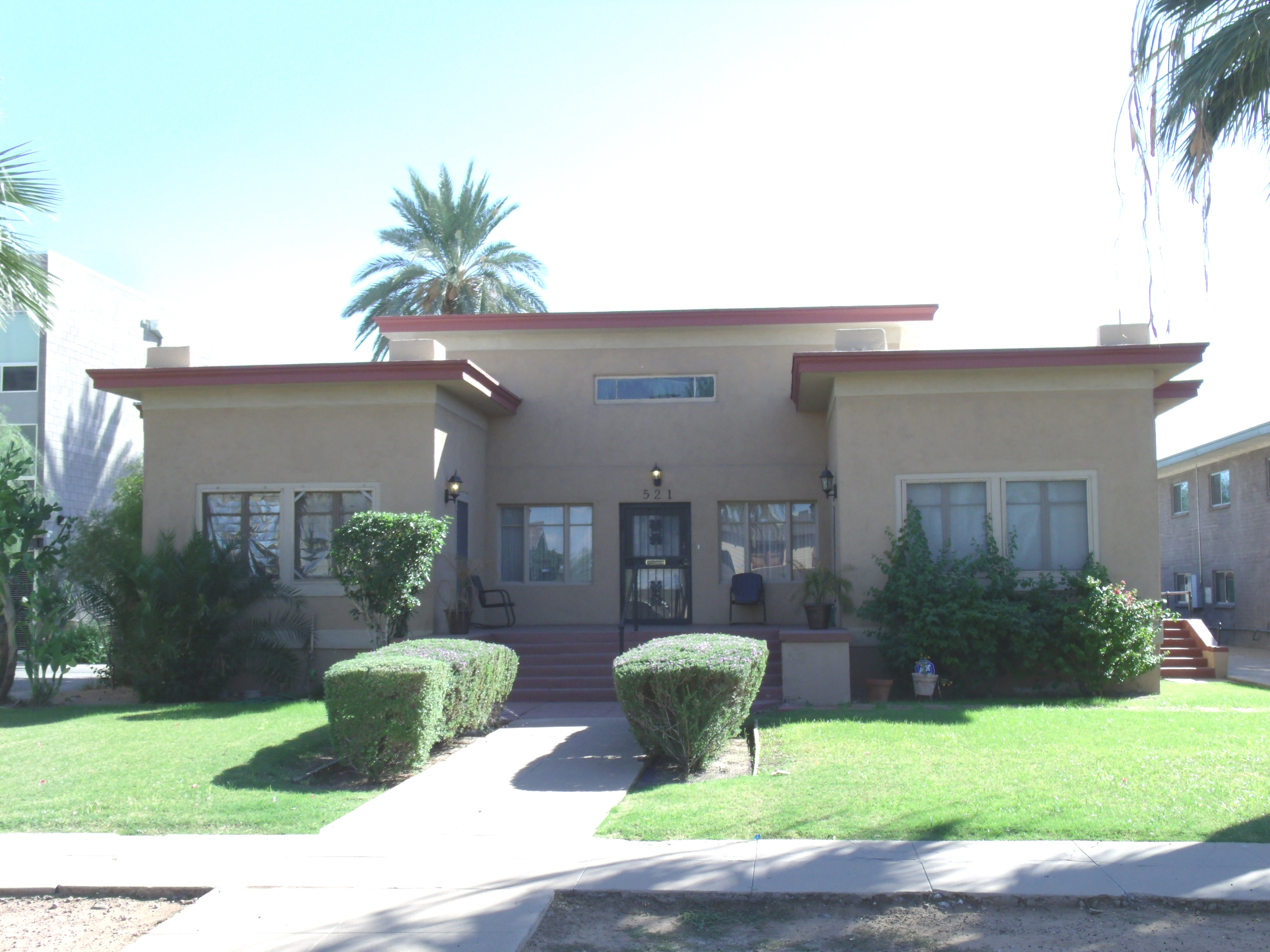
The Agren-Taylor House was built in 1921 and is located at 521 East Willetta Street. The house was listed in the Phoenix Historic Property Register in June 2009.

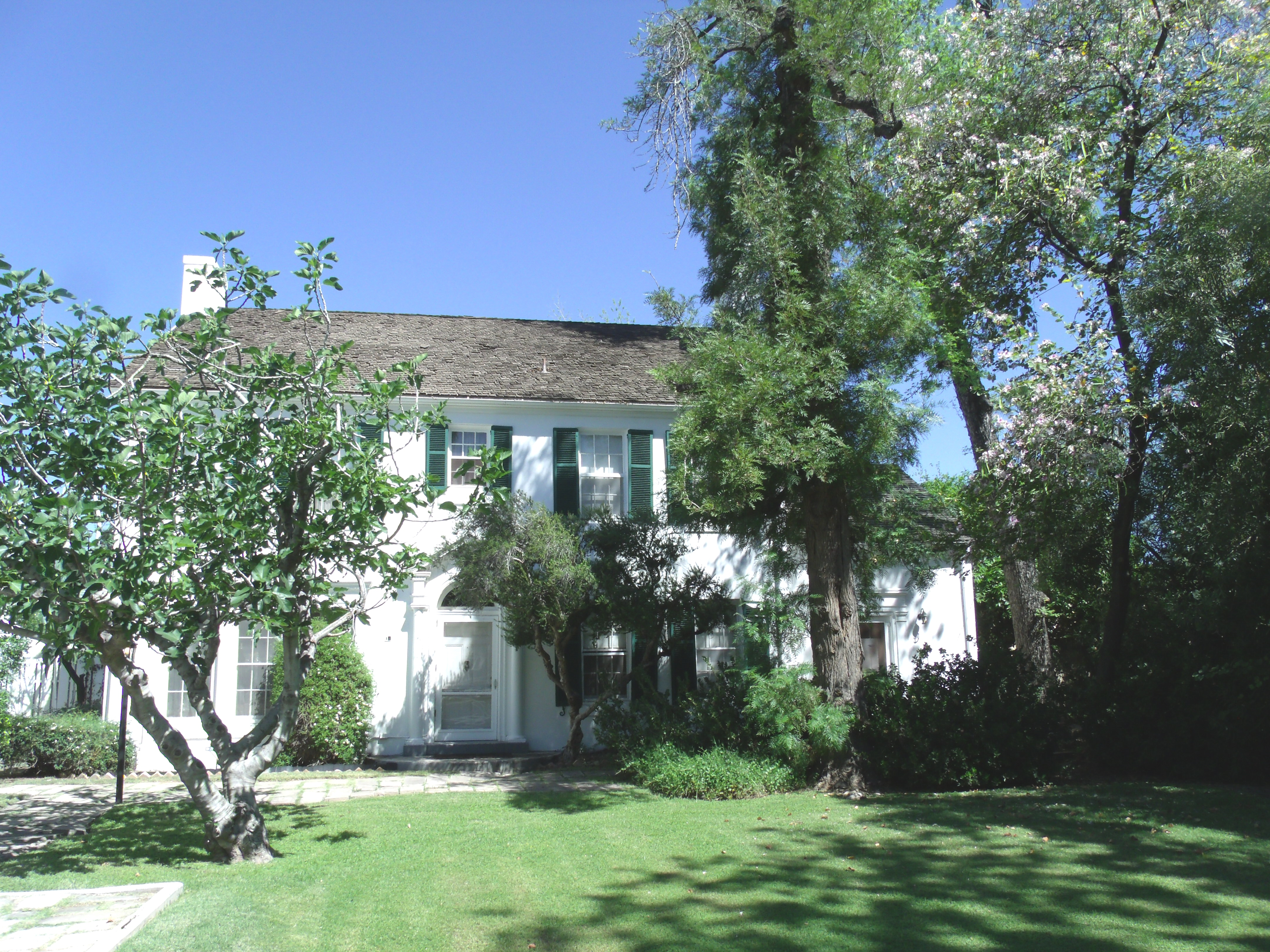
The J.F. Kelly House was built in 1922 and is located at 44 E. Palm Lane. It was listed in the Phoenix Historic Property Register in September 1992

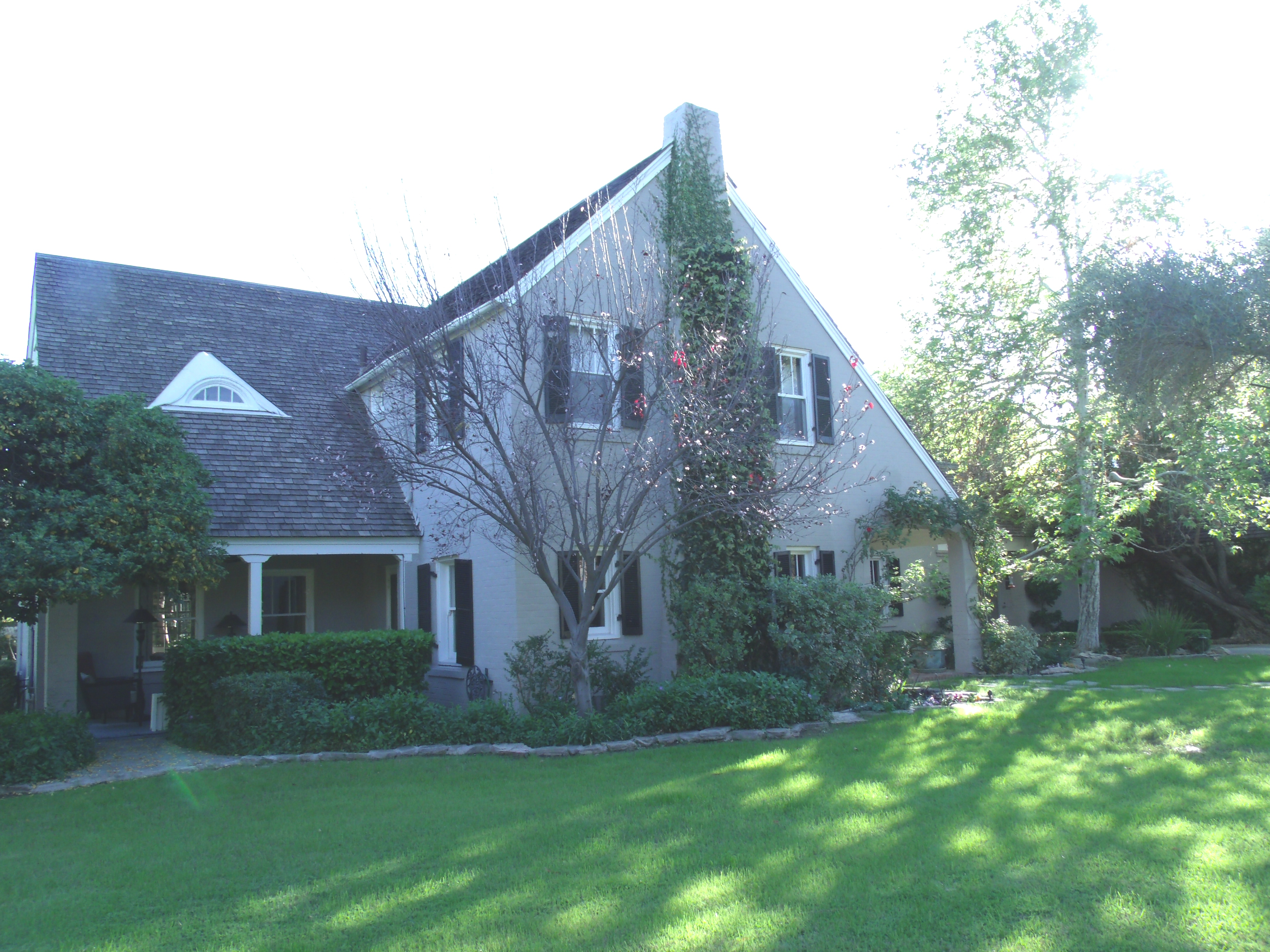
The Lewis Williams Douglas House was built 1923 and is located at 815 E. Orangewood Avenue. The house is historically significant for its association with Douglas, a nationally prominent Arizona politician and United States Congressman whose public career extended from 1922 through the years following World War II. During this period, Douglas served his home state and the nation in a number of elected and appointed positions of leadership. The house is listed in the National Register of Historic Places in 1985 ref. 85000188.

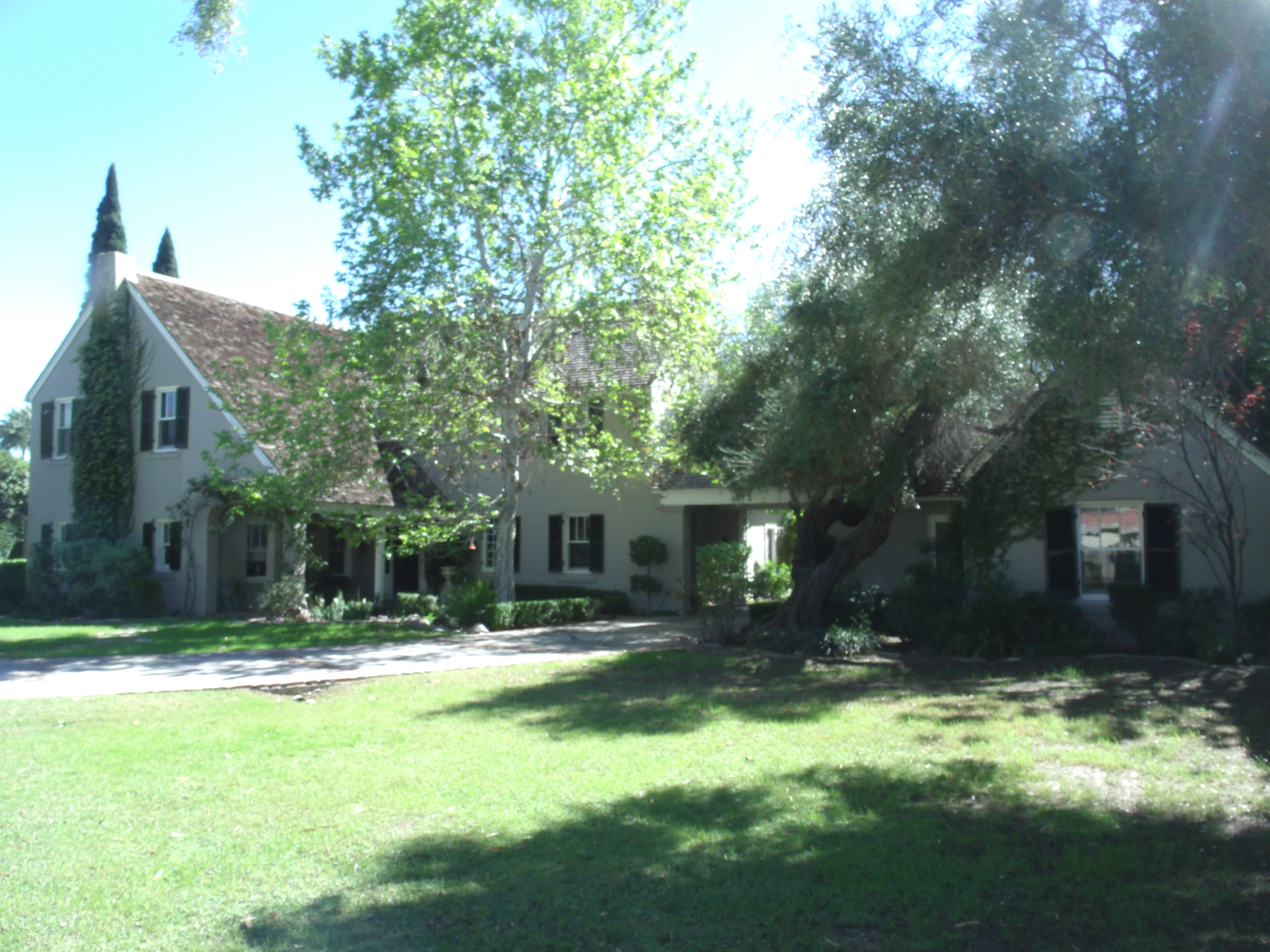
A different view of the Lewis Williams Douglas House. The house was built 1923 and is located at 815 E. Orangewood Avenue. The house is listed in the National Register of Historic Places in 1985 ref. 85000188.

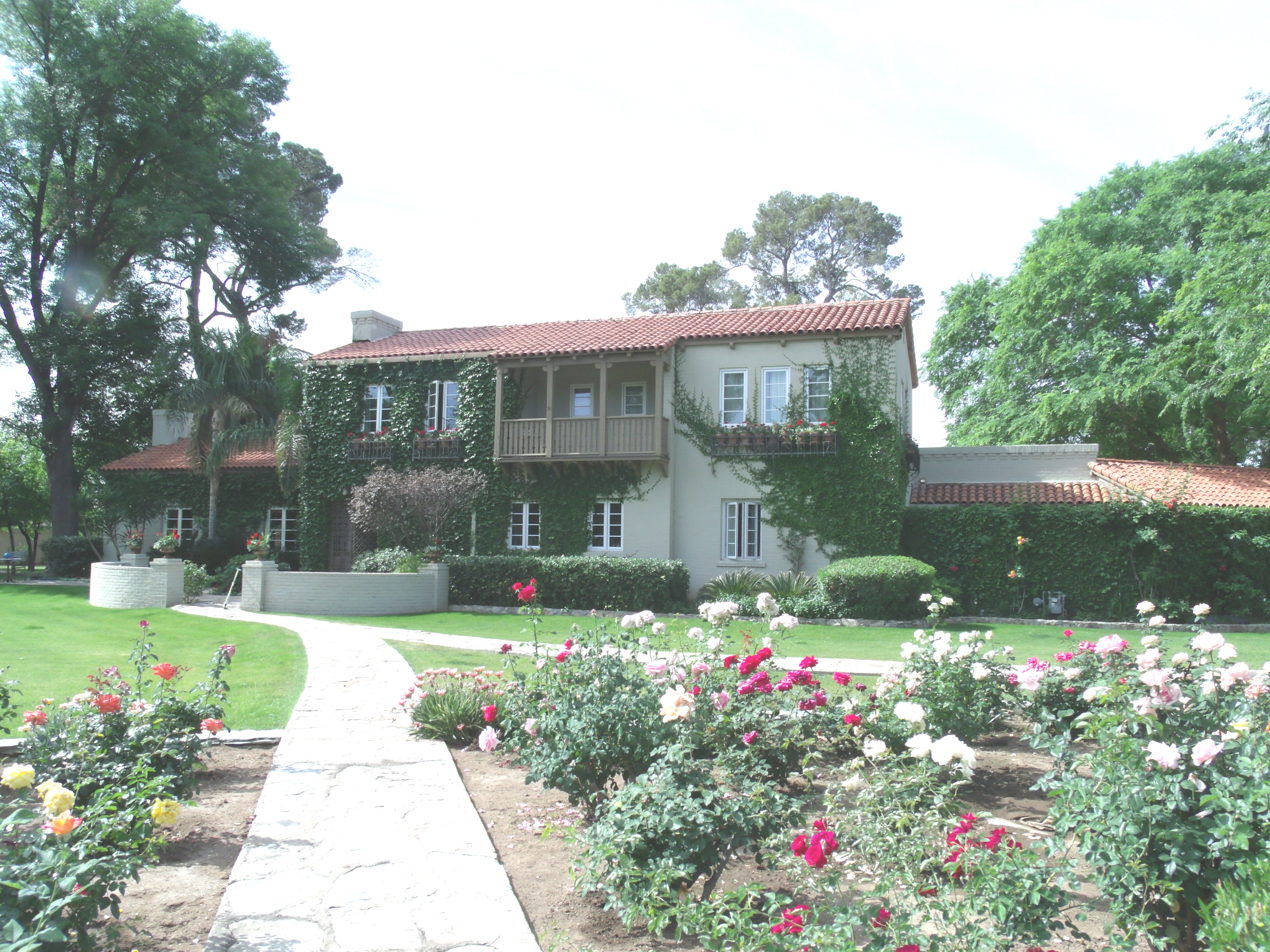
The Craig Mansion was built in 1925 and is located at 131 E. Country Club Dr., The mansions' architectural styles are that of a late 19th and 20th Century Revival: Mission/Spanish Revival and architectural type; Spanish Colonial Revival. It was listed in the National Register of Historic Places on August 18, 1992, reference #92001013.

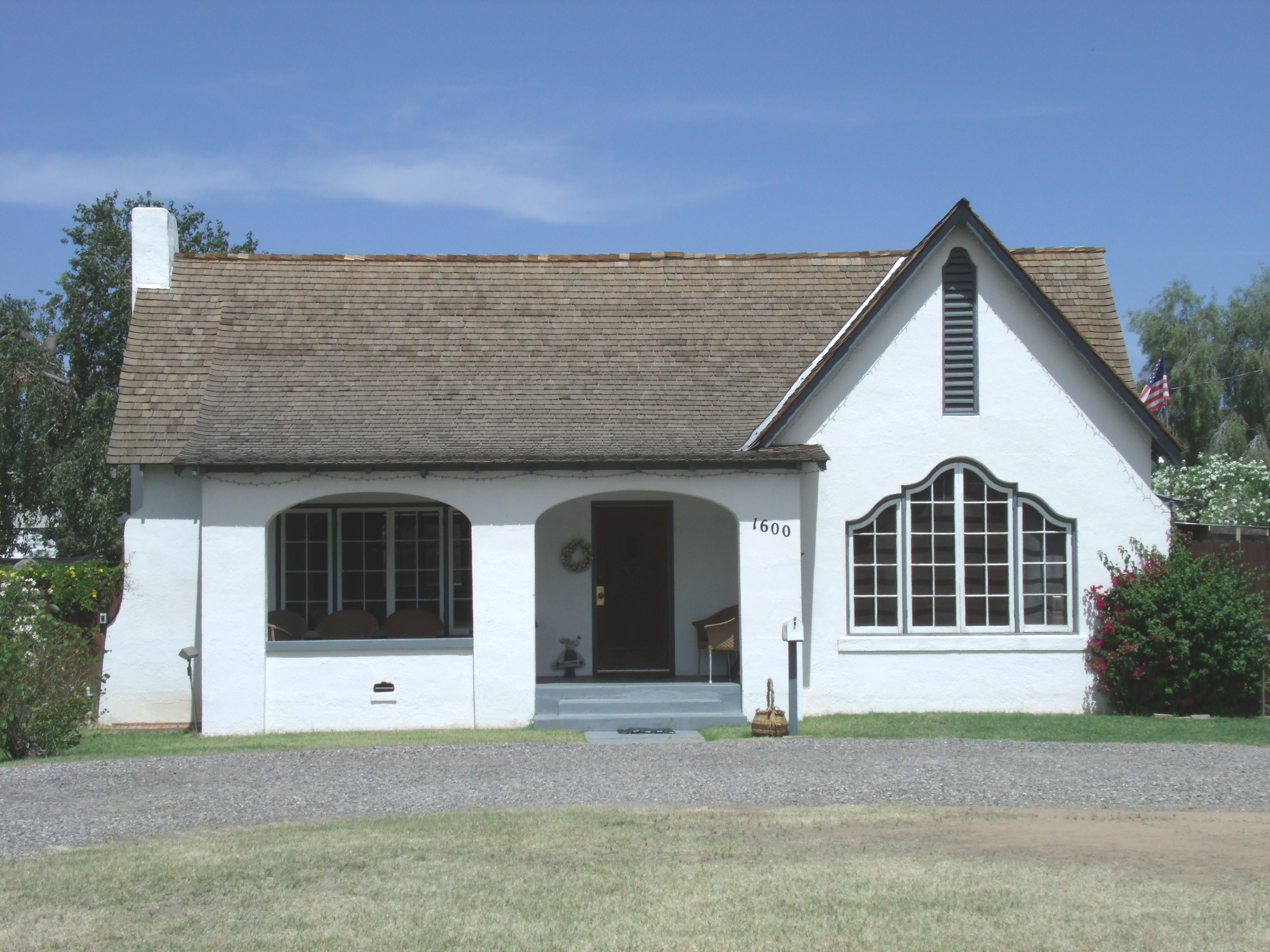
The George H. Vradenburg House/Tudor Revival Residence was built in 1925 and is located at 1600 W. Colter St. It was listed in the National Register of Historic Places in March 2003, reference #10000156.

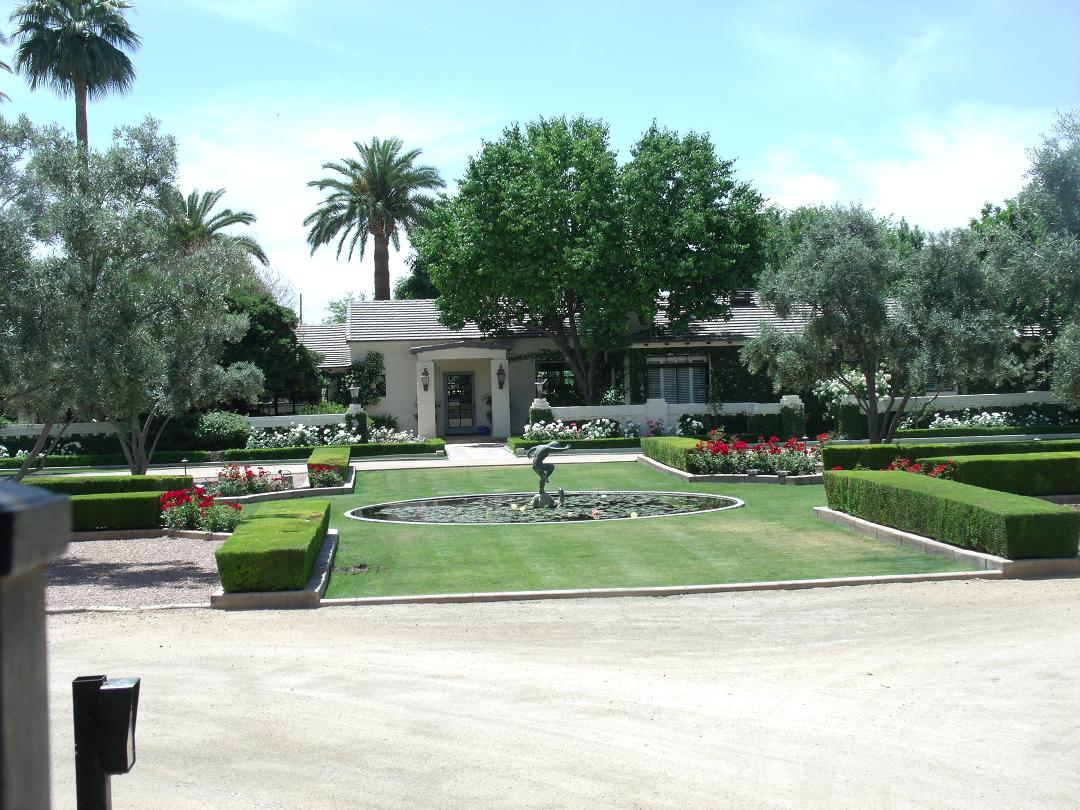
The El Chaparal House was built in 1925 and is located at 4935 E. Lafayette Blvd. Listed in the National Register of Historic Places in 2011. Reference number 11000631.

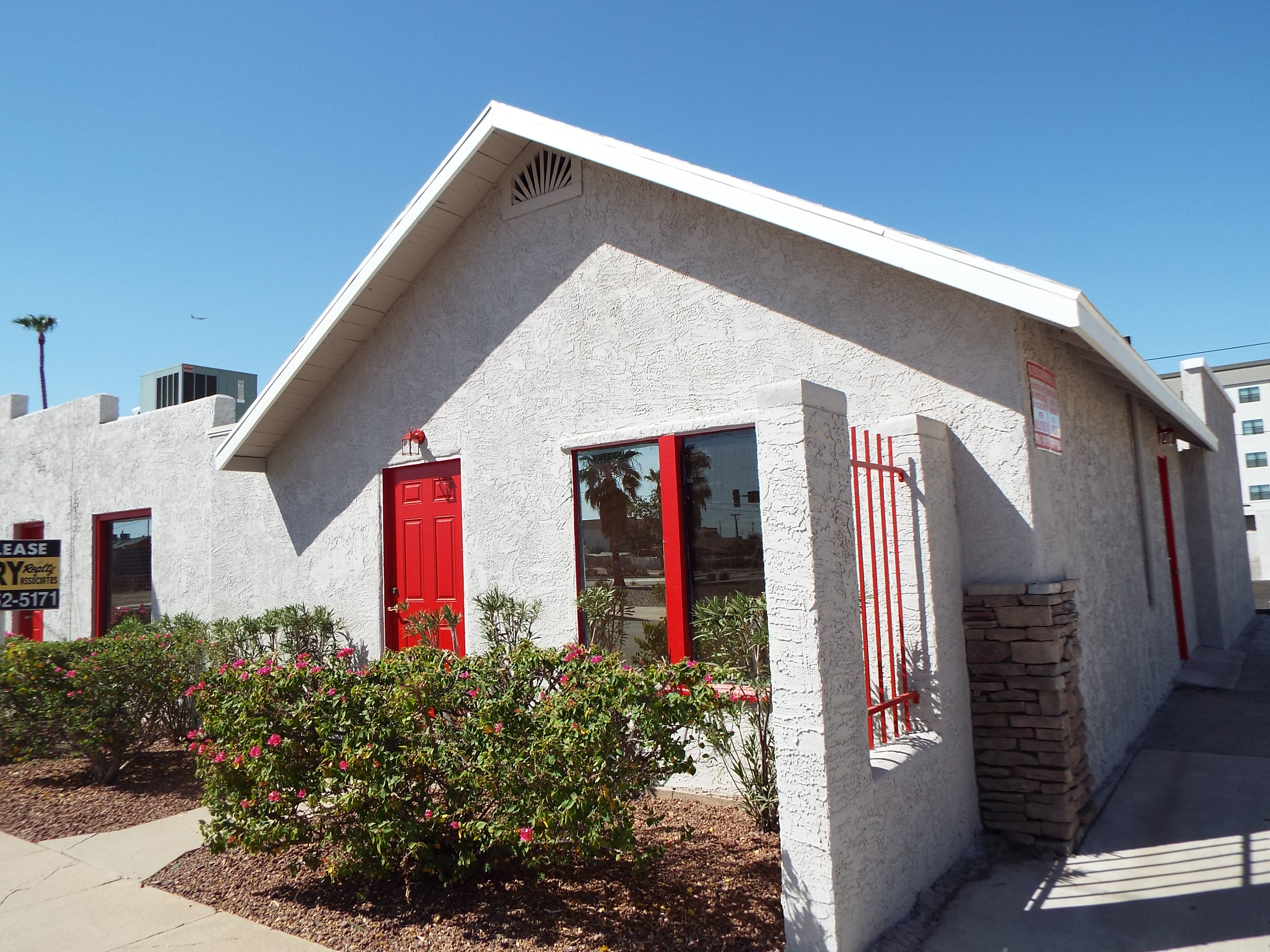
The Wing F. Ong House located in the back of the Wing F. Ong grocery store. It was listed in the Phoenix Historic Property Register.

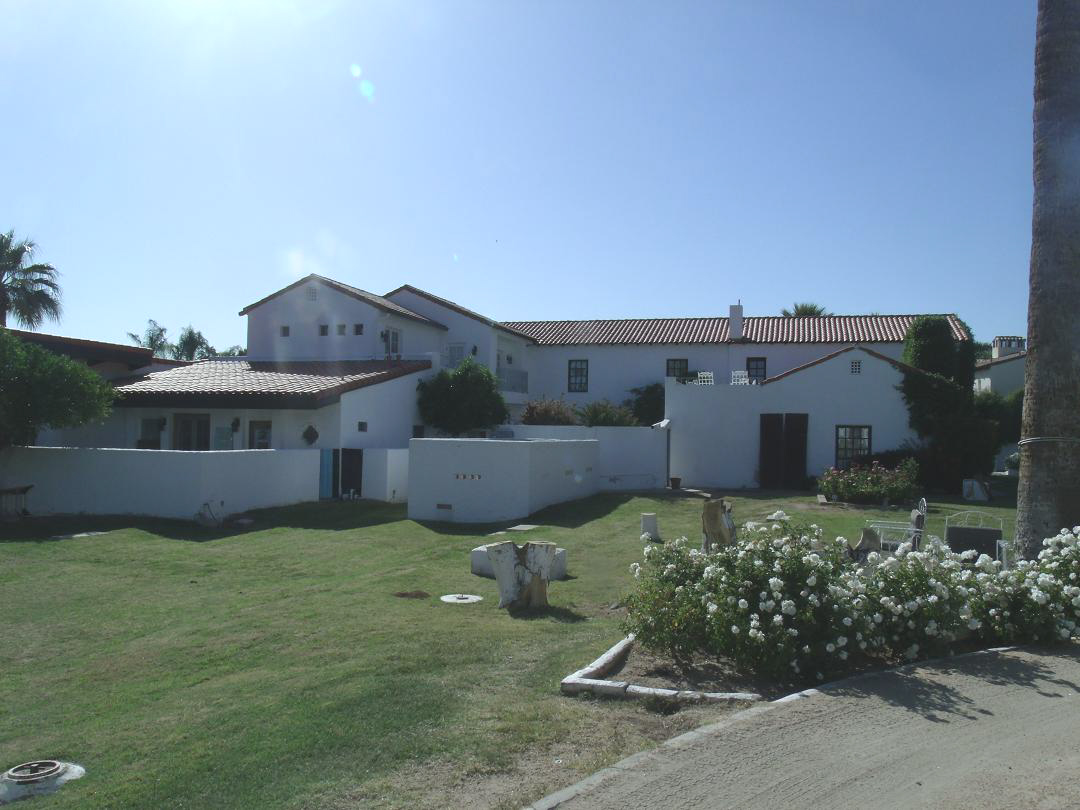
The Charles H. Pratt House was built in 1925 and is located at 4979 E Camelback Road. It was added to the National Register of Historic Places in 1996. Reference number 96001274

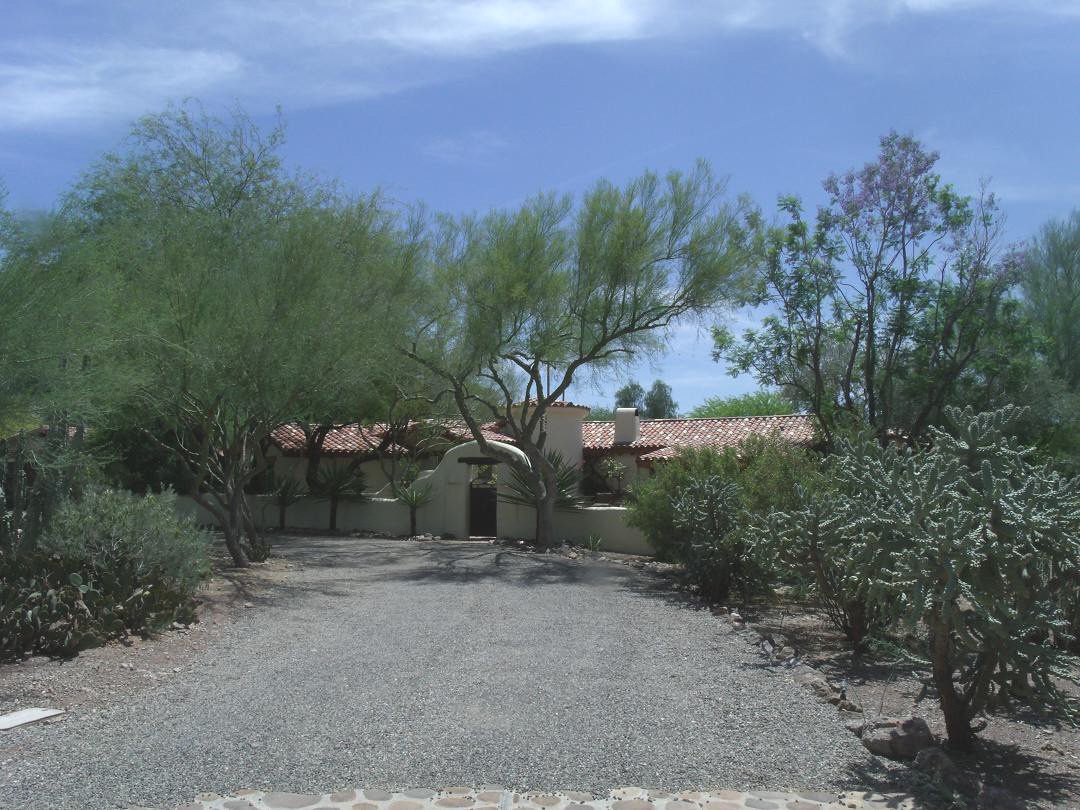
Sarah and Jack Harelson House was built in 1925. It is located at 4437 E. Arlington Road. Phoenix. Listed in the National Register of Historic Places in 2010. Reference number 10000152.

The Samuel L. Bartlett House was built in 1925 and is located at 325 W. Northern Avenue. On October 3, 1996, the house was listed on the National Register of Historic Places, ref.: #96001057.

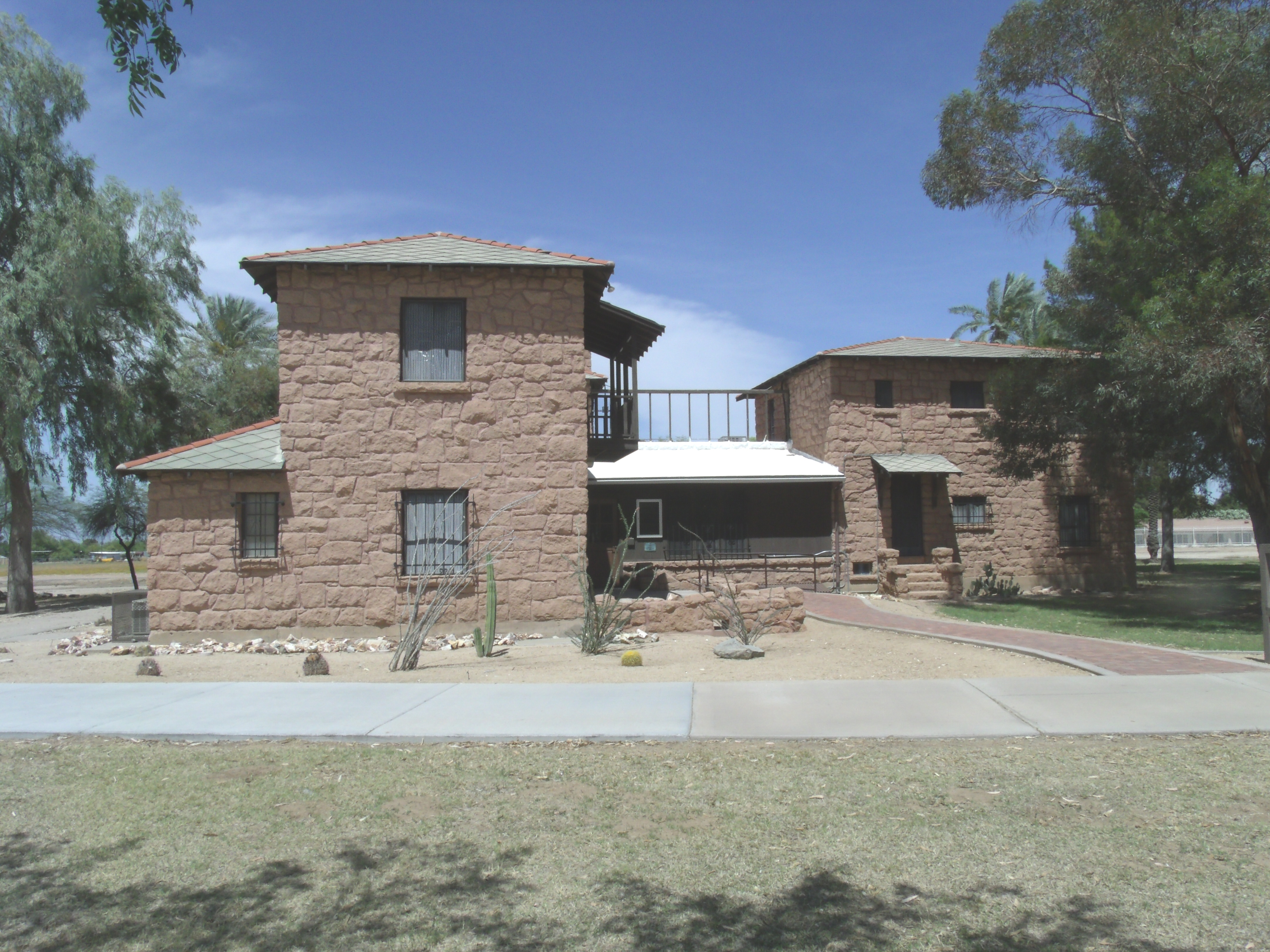
The Rancho Ko-Mat-Ke House was built in 1925 and is located at 1346 E. South Mountain Avenue. It was listed in the Phoenix Historic Property Register in April 1989.

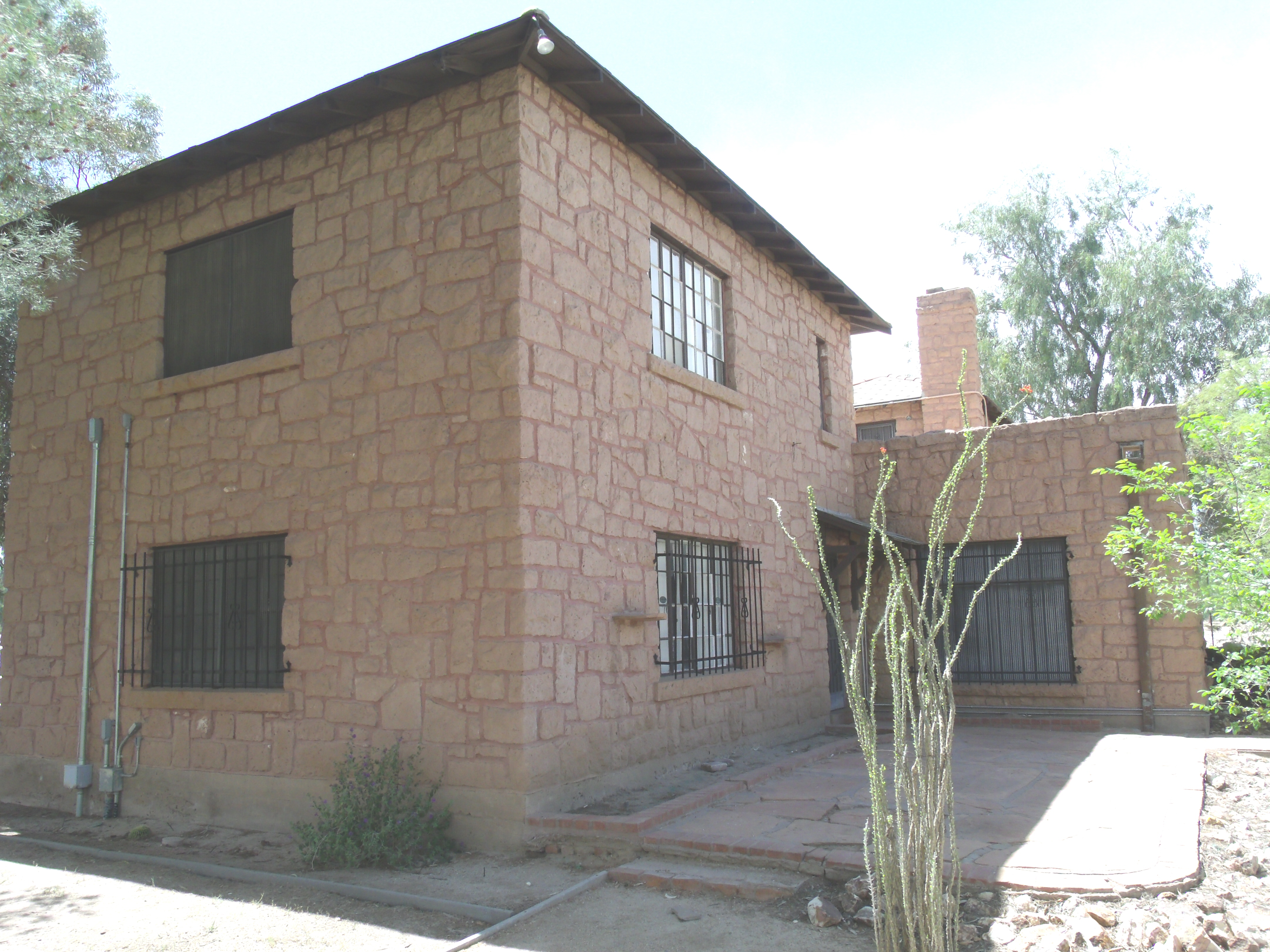
Side view of the Rancho Ko-Mat-Ke House, which was built in 1925 and is located at 1346 E. South Mountain Avenue. It was listed in the Phoenix Historic Property Register in April 1989.

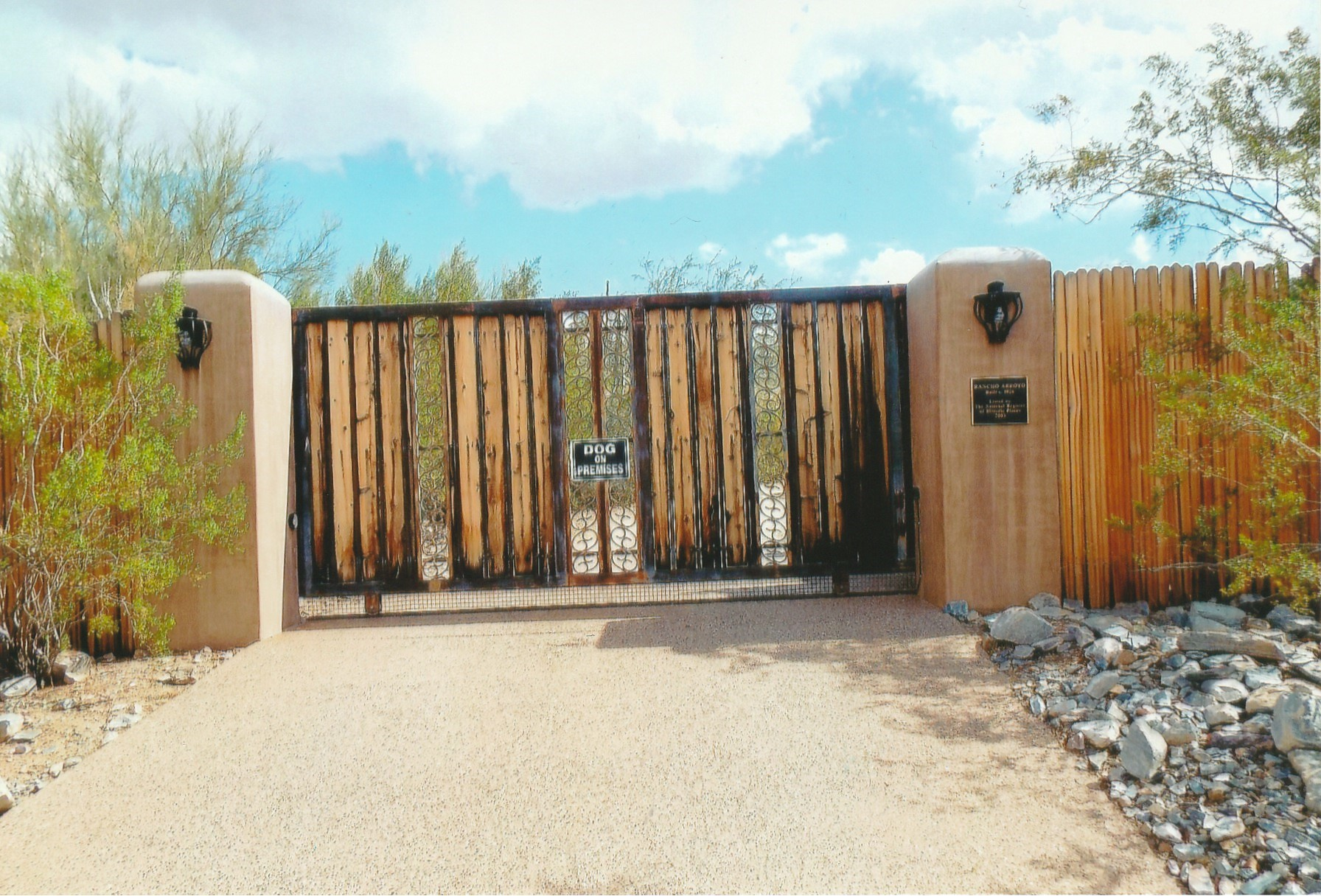
Rancho Arroyo main gate. The ranch was established in 1926 and is located on 6737 North 20th Street. It was listed in the National Register of Historic Places on September 12, 2003, reference: #03000901.

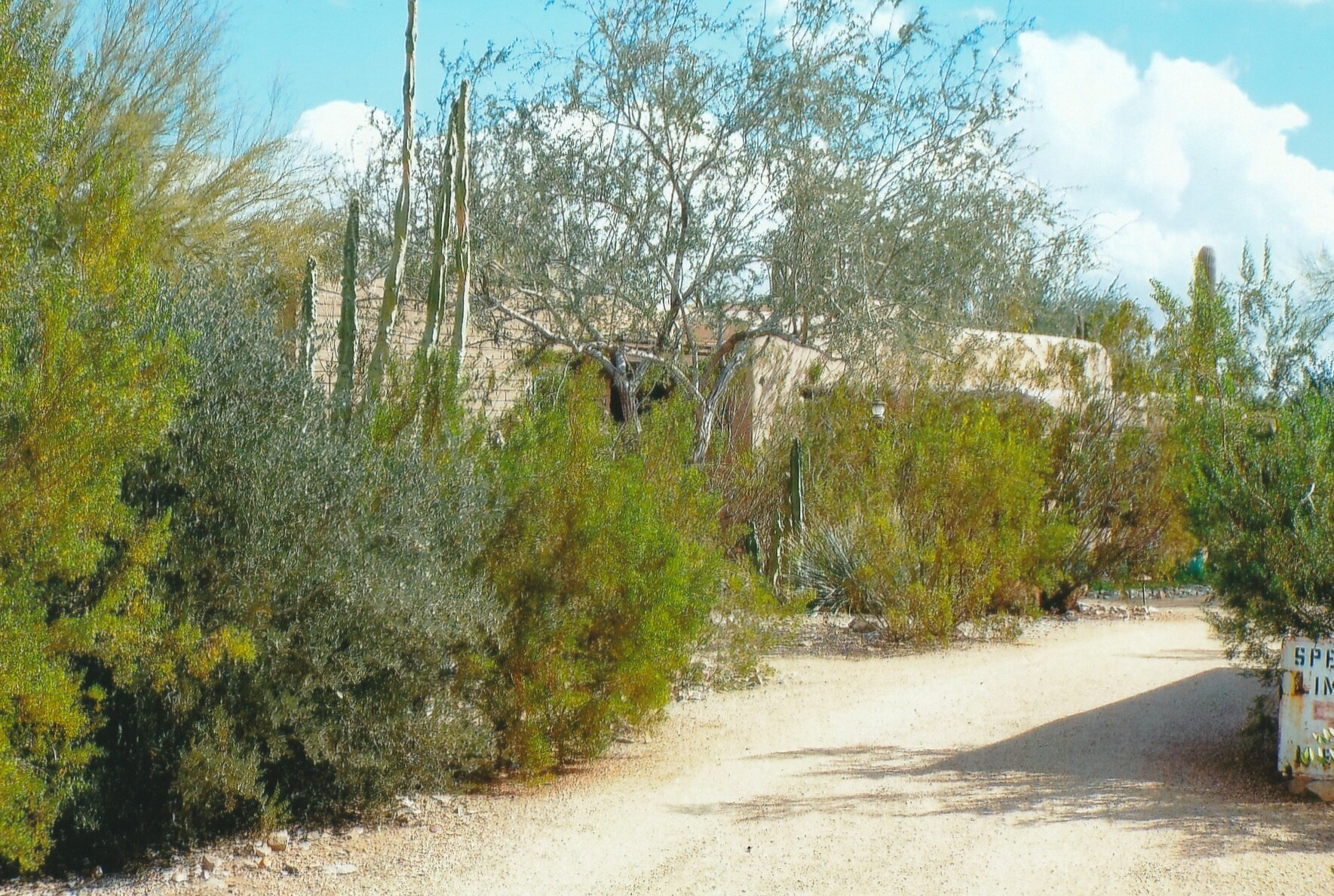
Rancho Arroyo House .

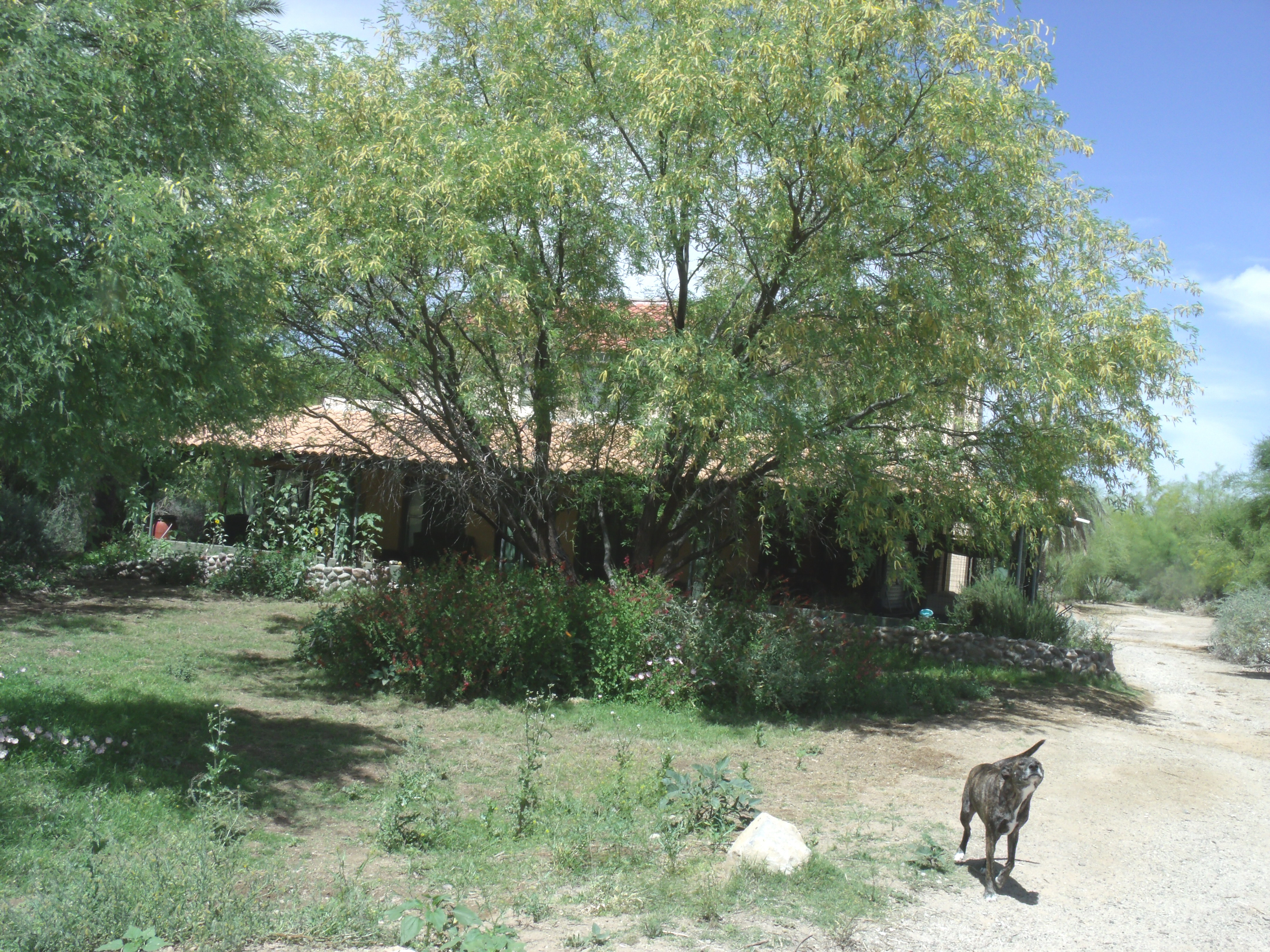
The Spanish Colonial Revival Residence located at 1200 W. South Mountain Avenue. was built in 1926. It was listed in the Phoenix Historic Property Register in March 2008.

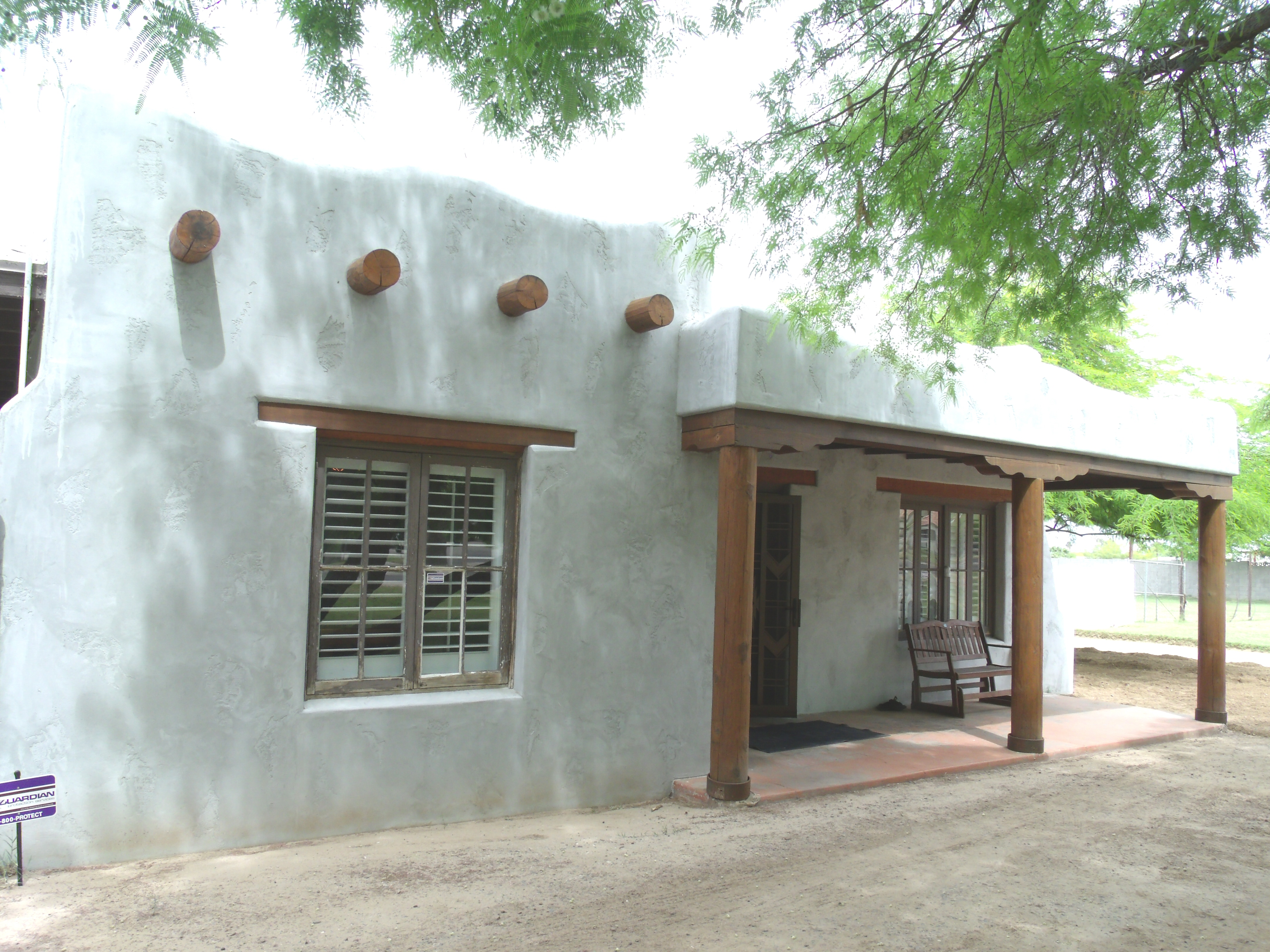
The Pueblo Revival Residence located at 46 E. Greenway Road was built in 1926. It was listed in the Phoenix Historic Property Register in July 1993.

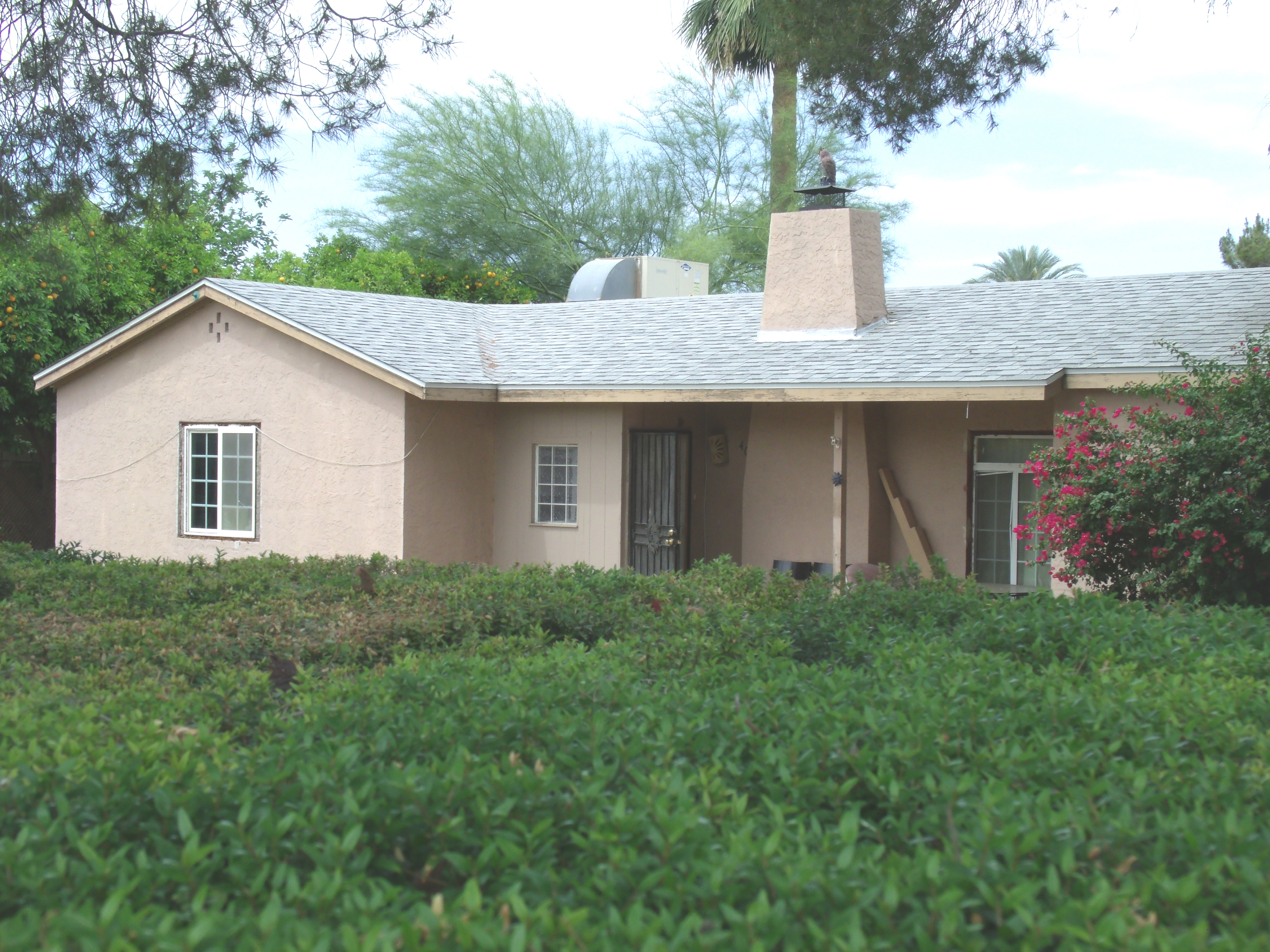
The Monterey Ranch Residence located at 40 E. Carter Road was built in 1927. It was listed in the Phoenix Historic Property Register in July 1993.

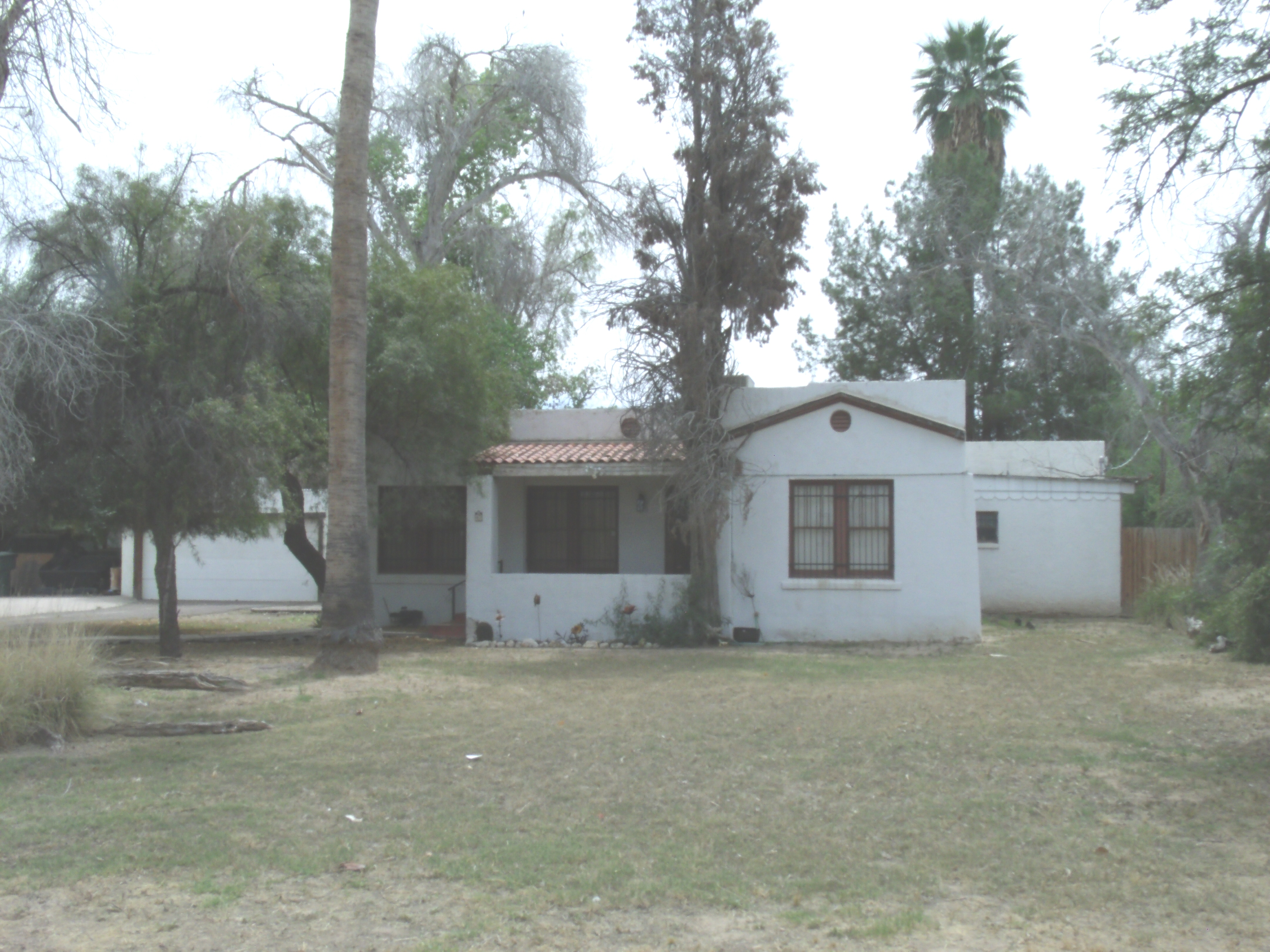
The Spanish Colonial Revival Residence located at 47 E. Carter Road was built in 1927. It was listed in the Phoenix Historic Property Register in March 2008.

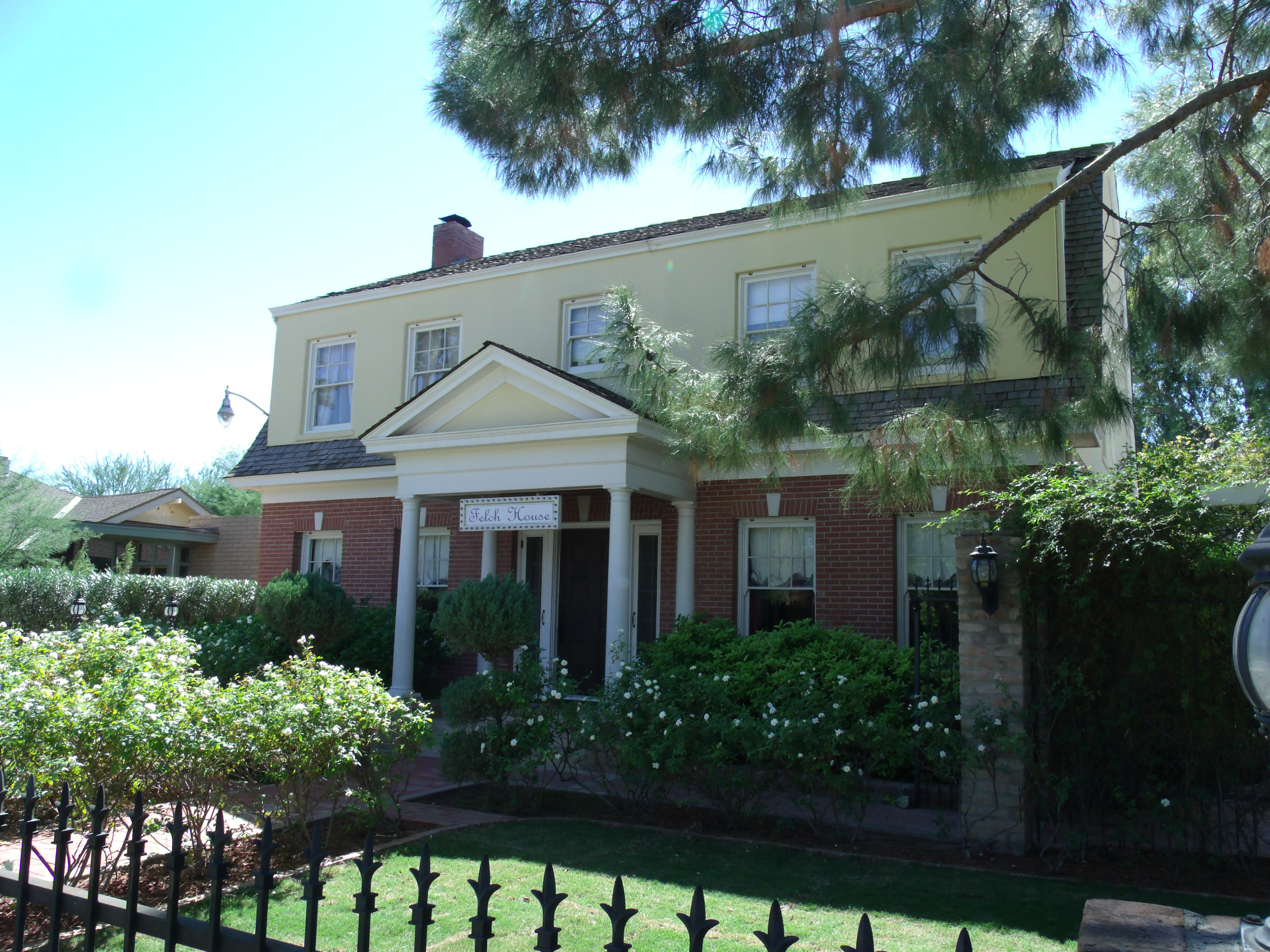
The Harry J. Felch House was built in 1927 and is located in 525 W. Lynwood Street. The Dutch Colonial Home is in Phoenix's historic Roosevelt District. The district is listed in the National Register of Historic Places, reference 83003490.

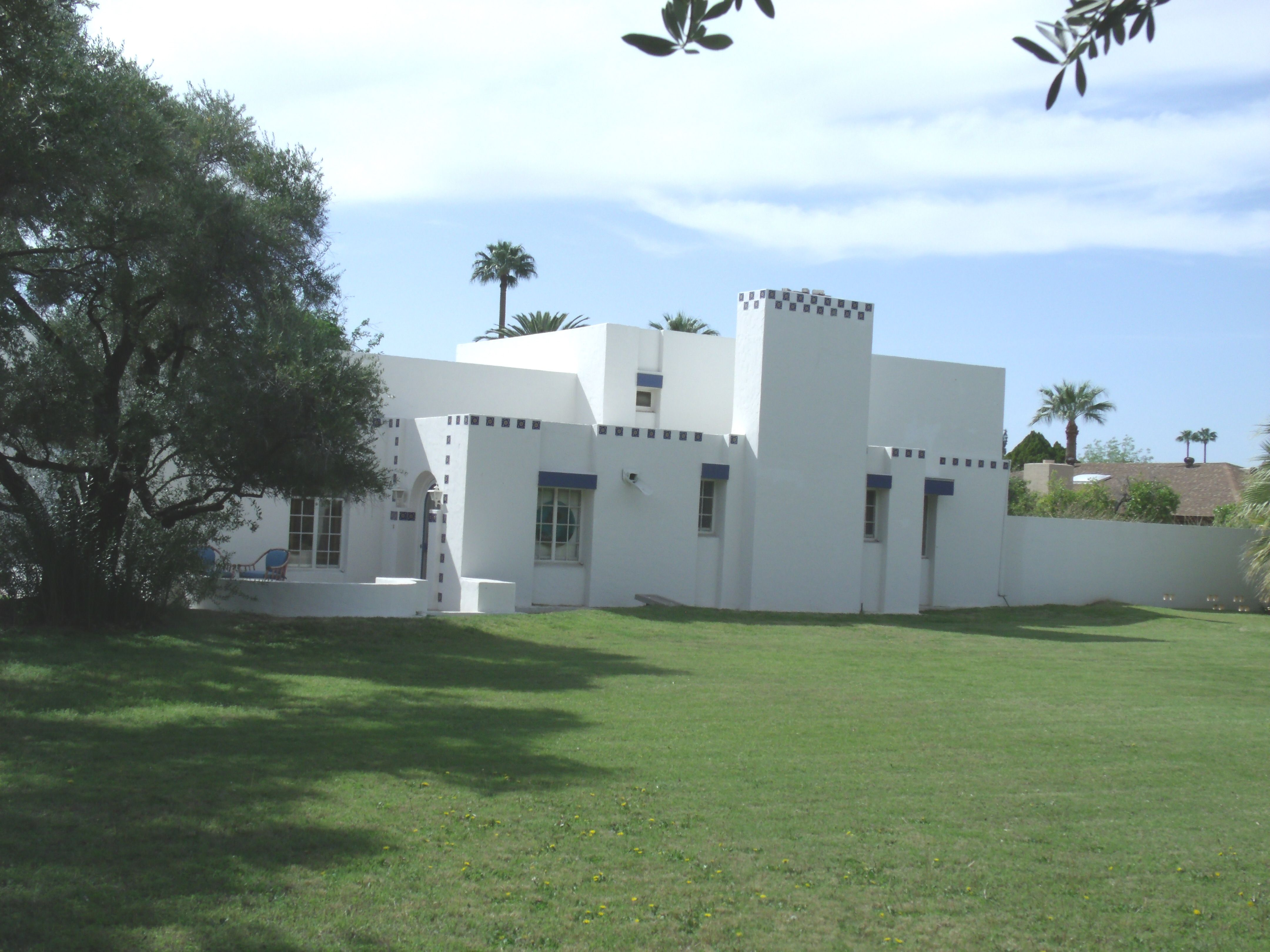
The David Morgan-Earl A. Bronson House was built in 1927 and is located at 8030 N. Central Avenue. the house is listed on the National Register of Historic Places.

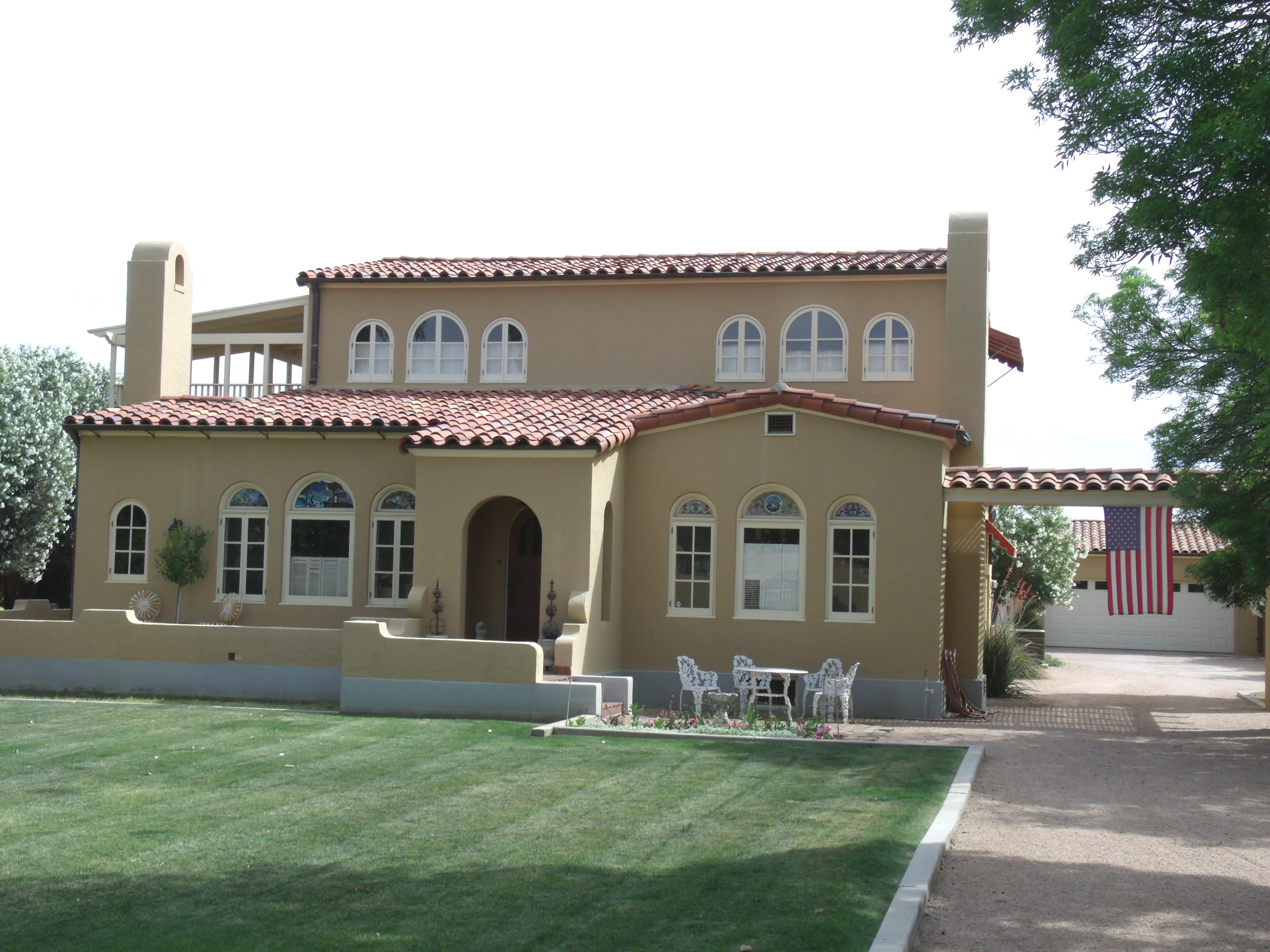
The N. Clyde Pierce House was built in 1927 and is located at 4505 E. Osborn Road. It was listed in the Phoenix Historic Property Register in May 1990 and on the National Register of Historic Places on January 8, 1998, reference #97001602.

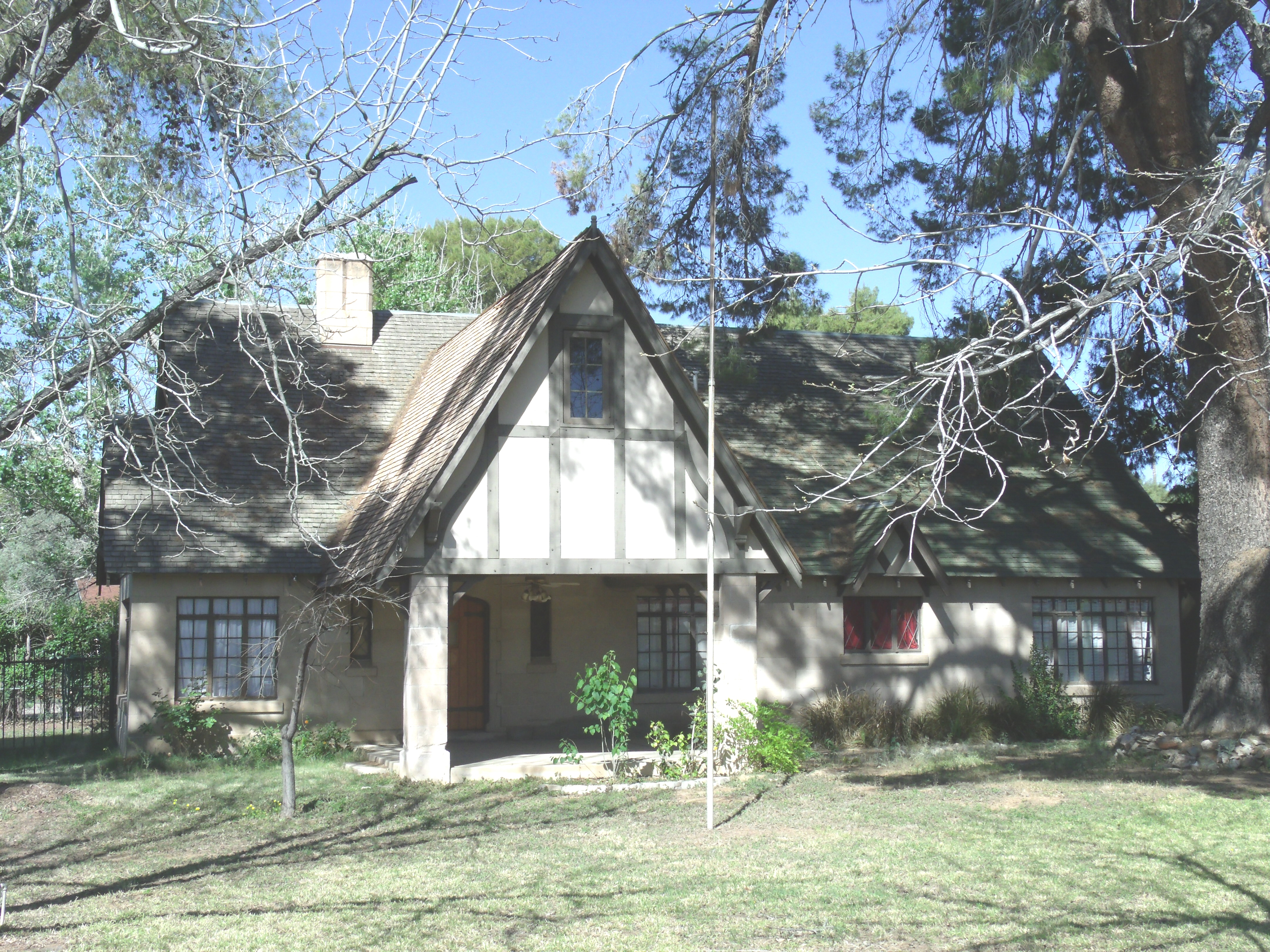
The Walter Lee Smith House was built in 1928 and is located at 7202 N. Seventh Avenue. It was listed in the National Register of Historic Places on January 24, 2011, reference #10001167.

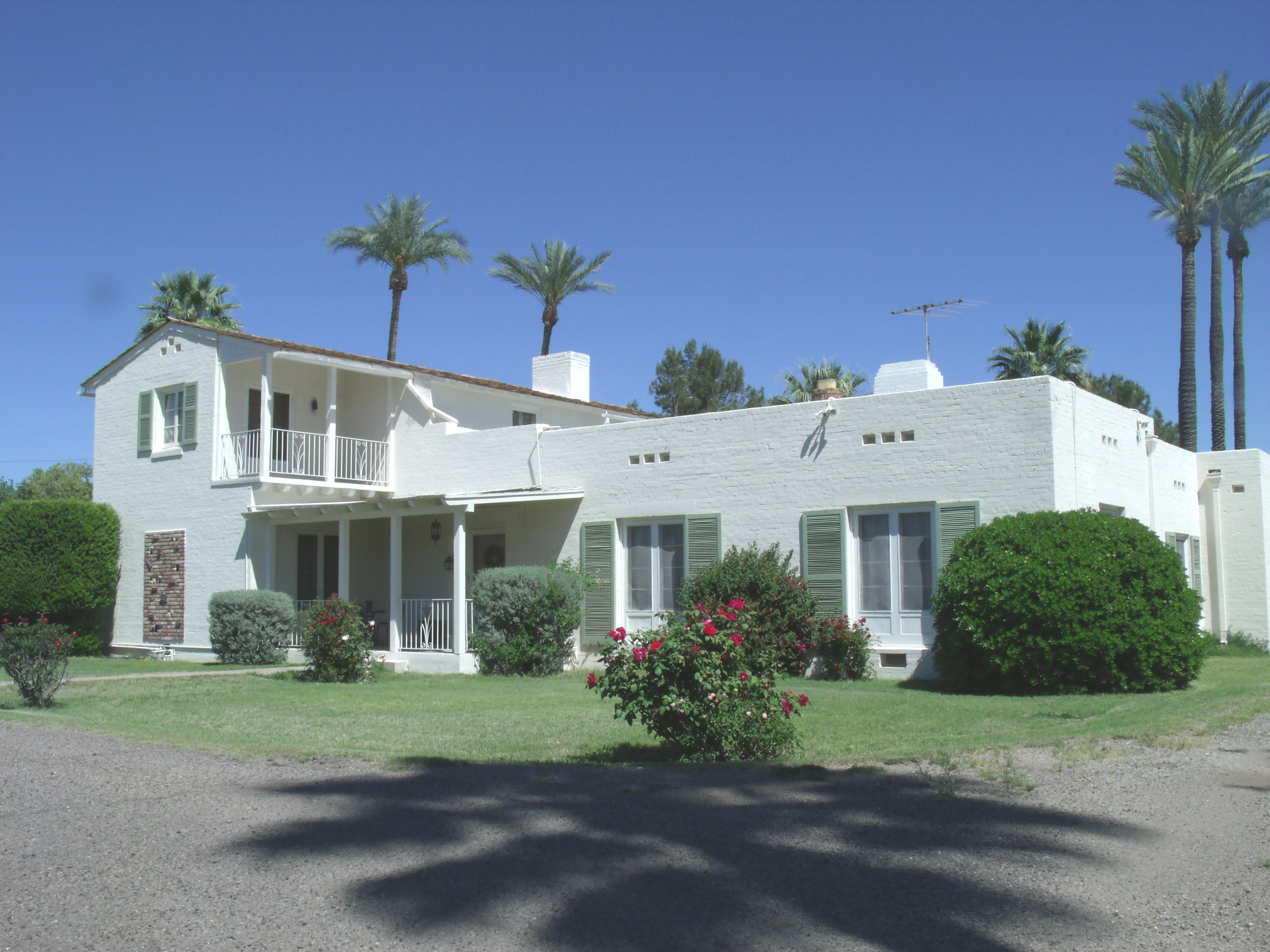
The Col. Edward Power Conway House was built in 1928 and is located at 7625 N. 10th St. It was listed in the National Register of Historic Places on January 24, 2011, reference #10001164.

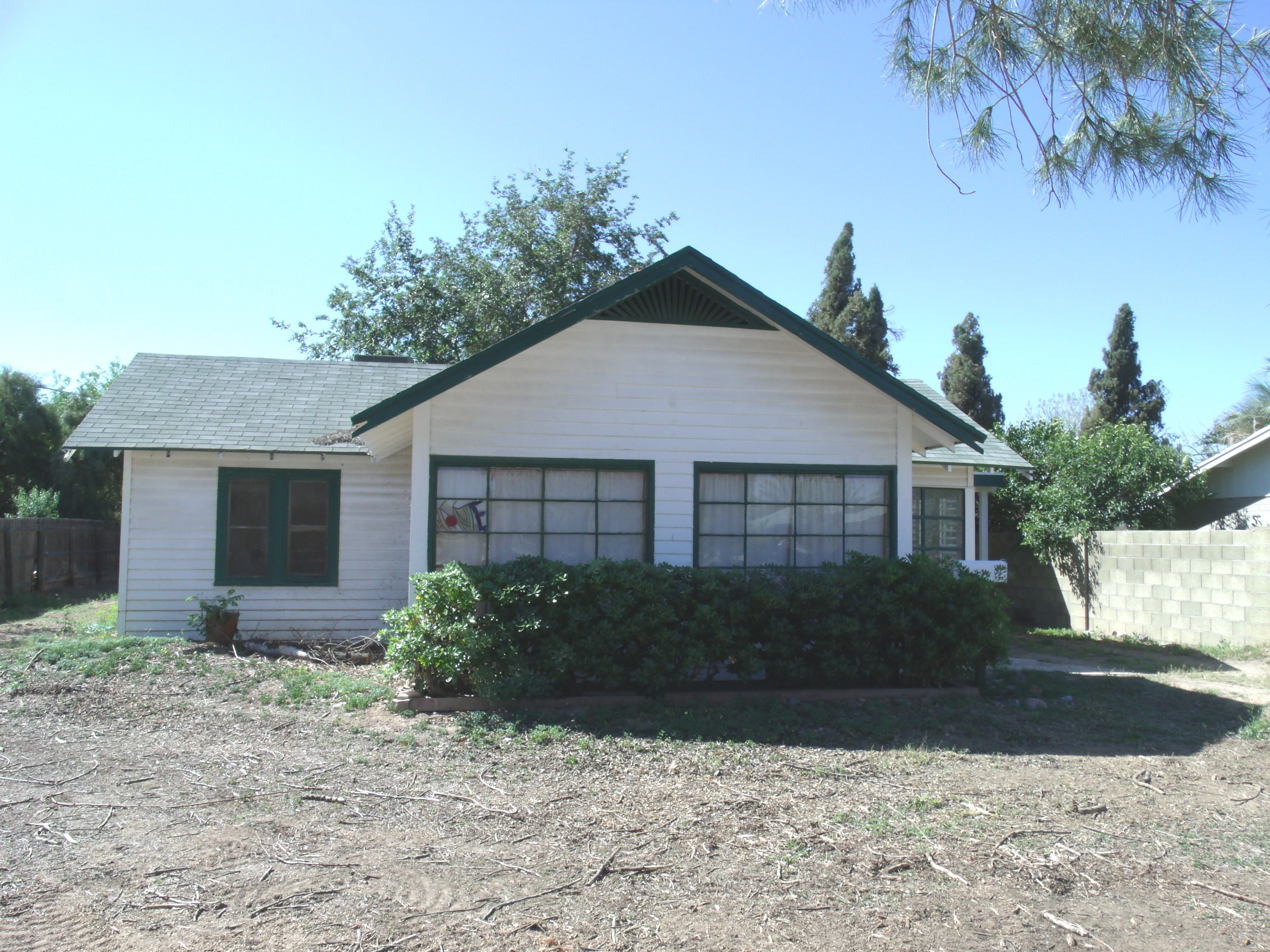
The Courtney and Hilda Stubbs House was built in 1928 and is located at 1245 E. Ocotillo Road. It was listed in the National Register of Historic Places on January 24, 2011, reference #10001166.

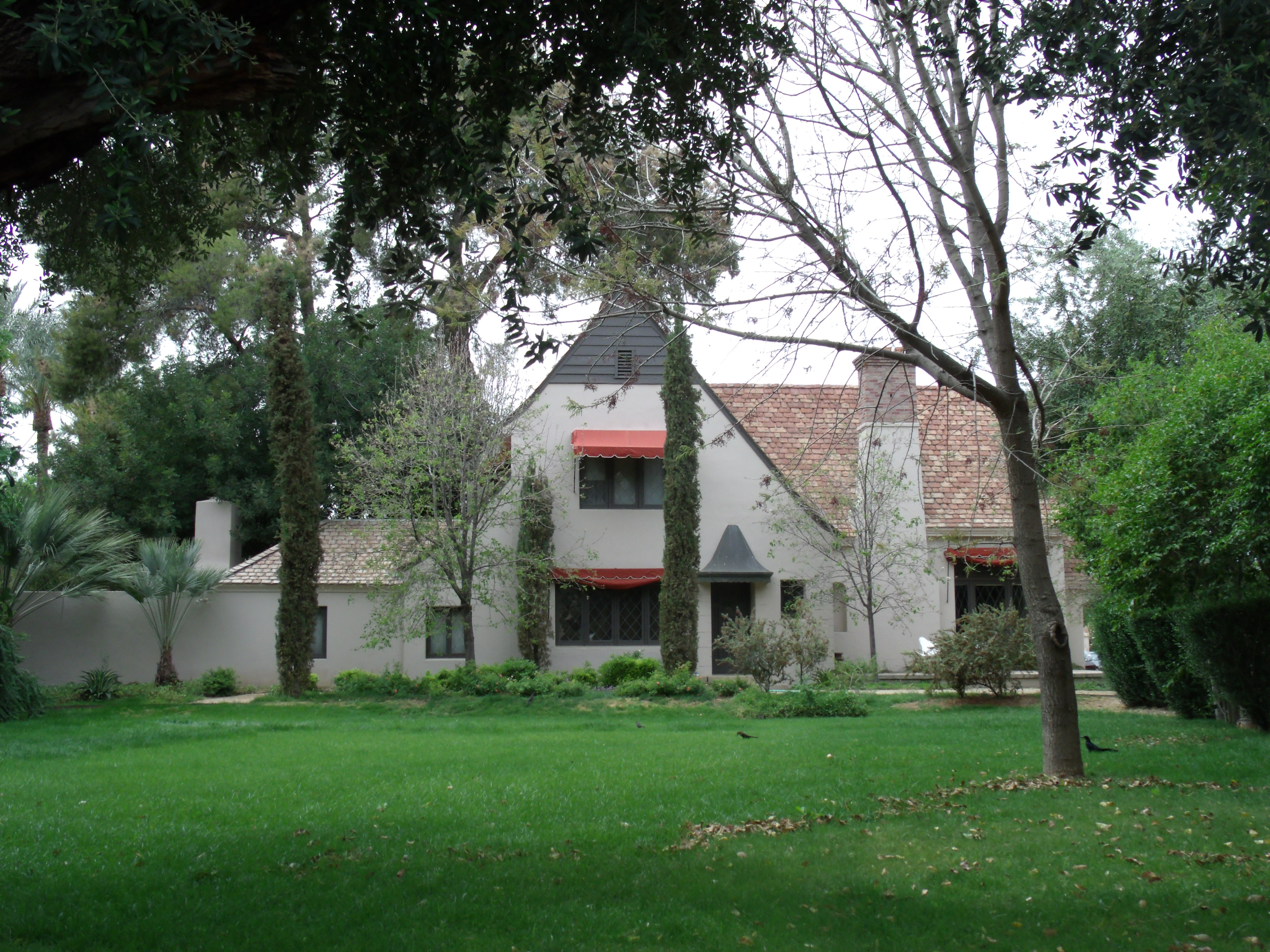
The Abner Elliot England-Guy Hidden Lawrence House was built in 1929 and is located at 6234 N Central Avenue. The house is listed on the National Register of Historic Places.

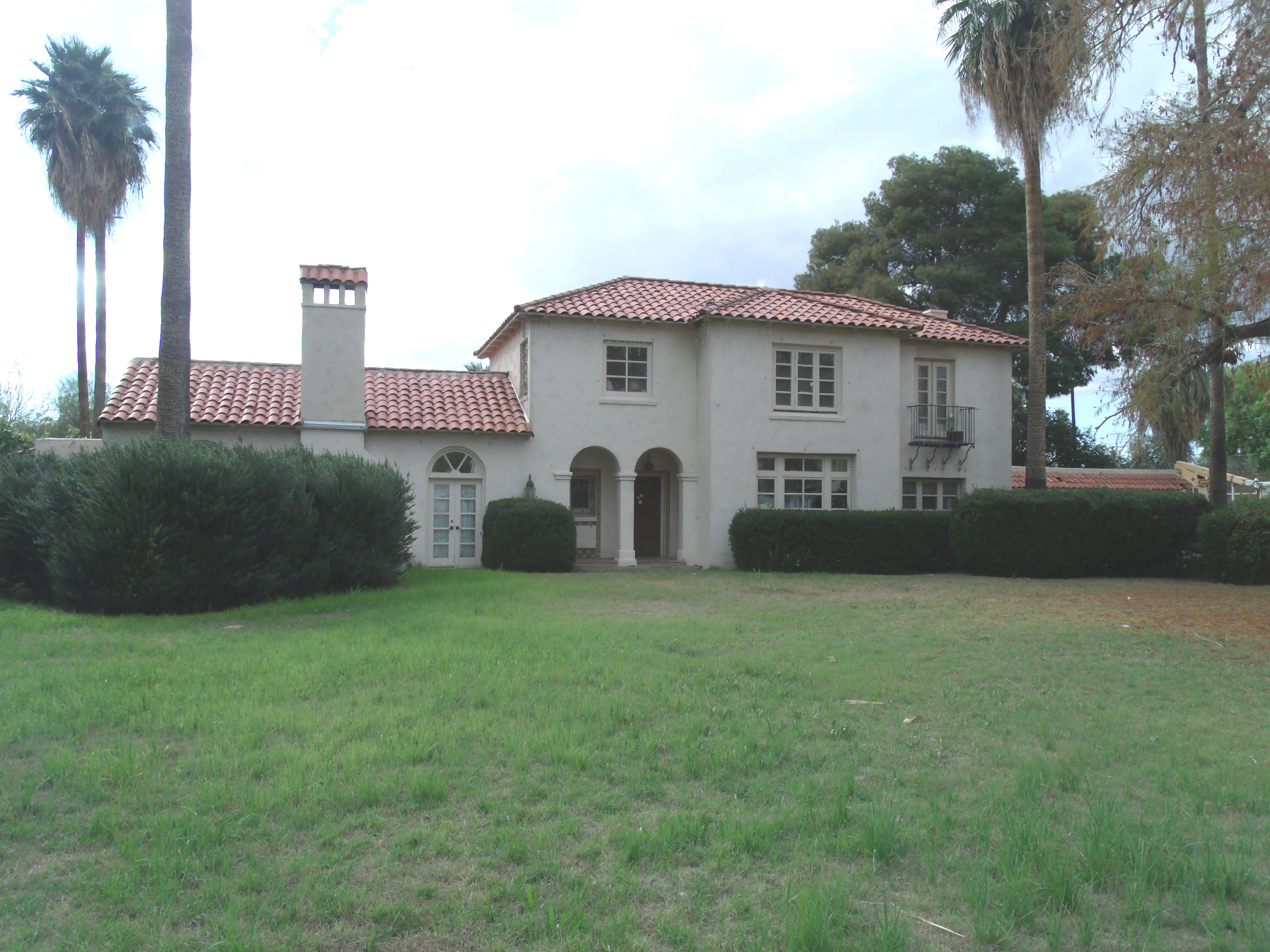
The Kinter K. Koontz House was built in 1928 and is located at 7620 N. 7th Street. The house is listed in the Phoenix Historic Property Register. On July 20, 2011, the house was listed in the National Register of Historic Places, reference number 11000463.

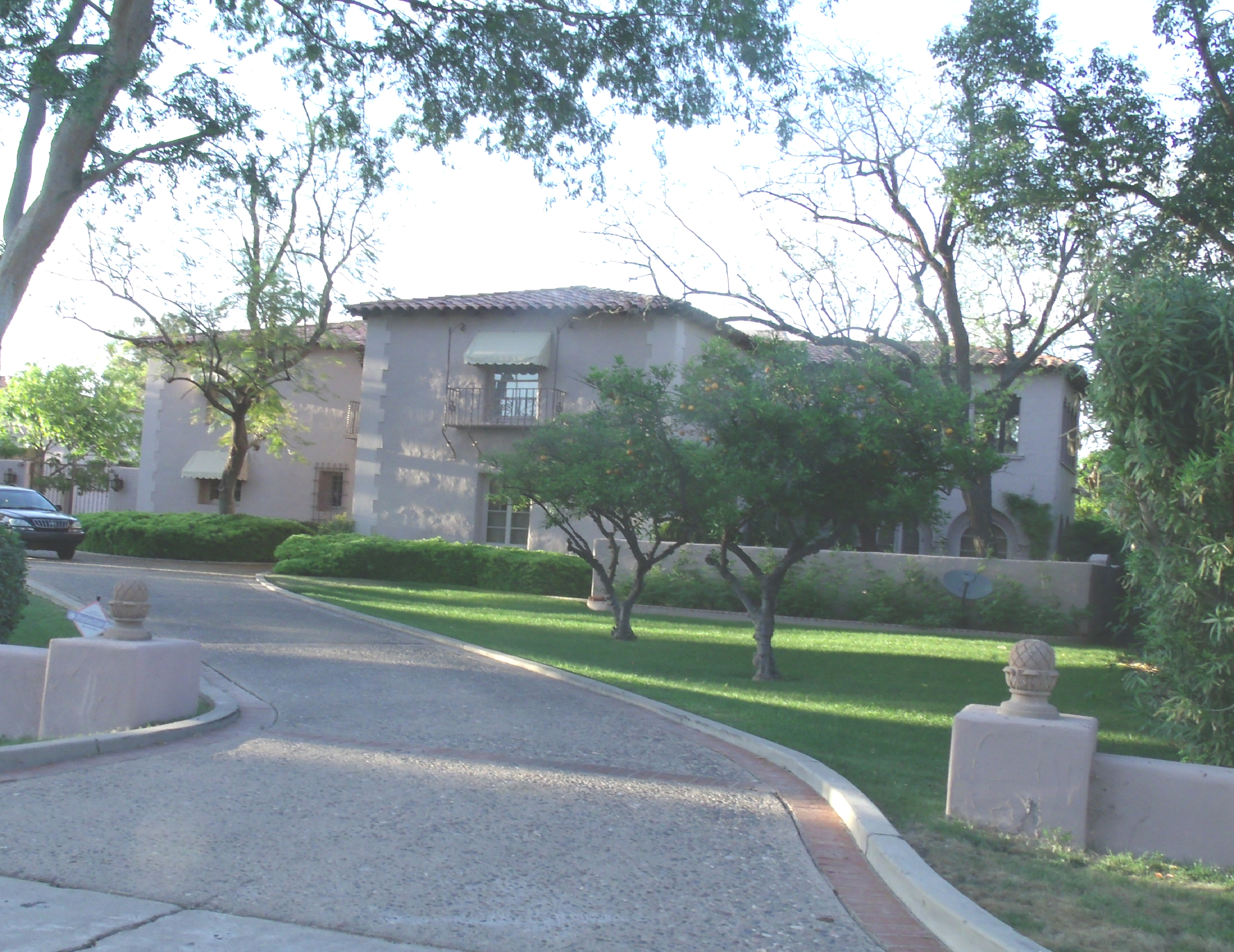
The Bennitt Mansion was built in 1928 and is located 126 E. Country Club Dr. The mansion was listed in the National Register of Historic Places on August 12, 2009, reference #09000609.

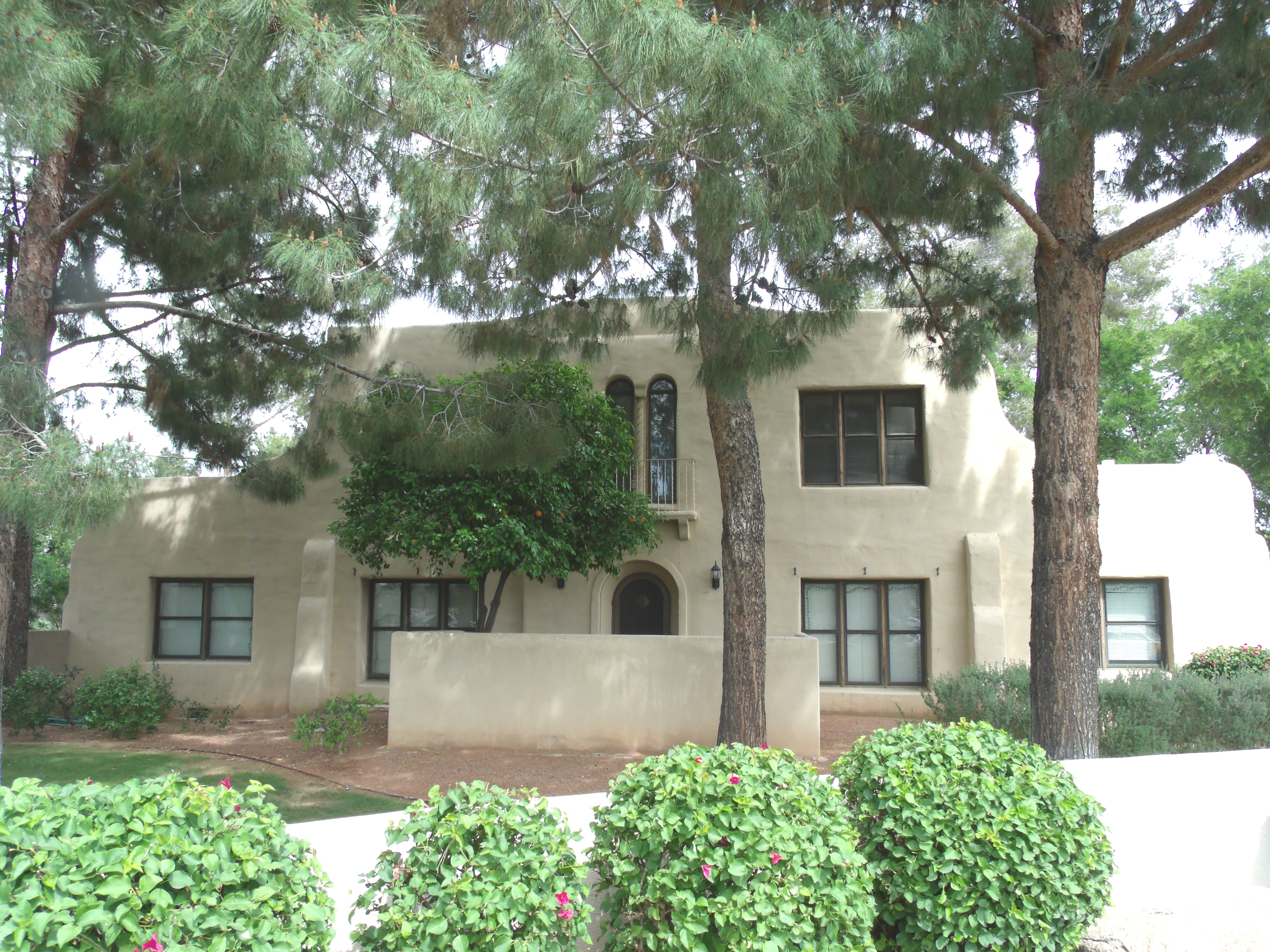
The Louis Bohn House. a.k.a. the Louis and Gertrude Bohn House was built in 1928 and is located at the corner of 8001 N. 7th Street/E. Northern Avenue. The house was called El Domingo by the Bohns. It was listed in the National Register of Historic Places on January 24, 2011, reference #10001165.

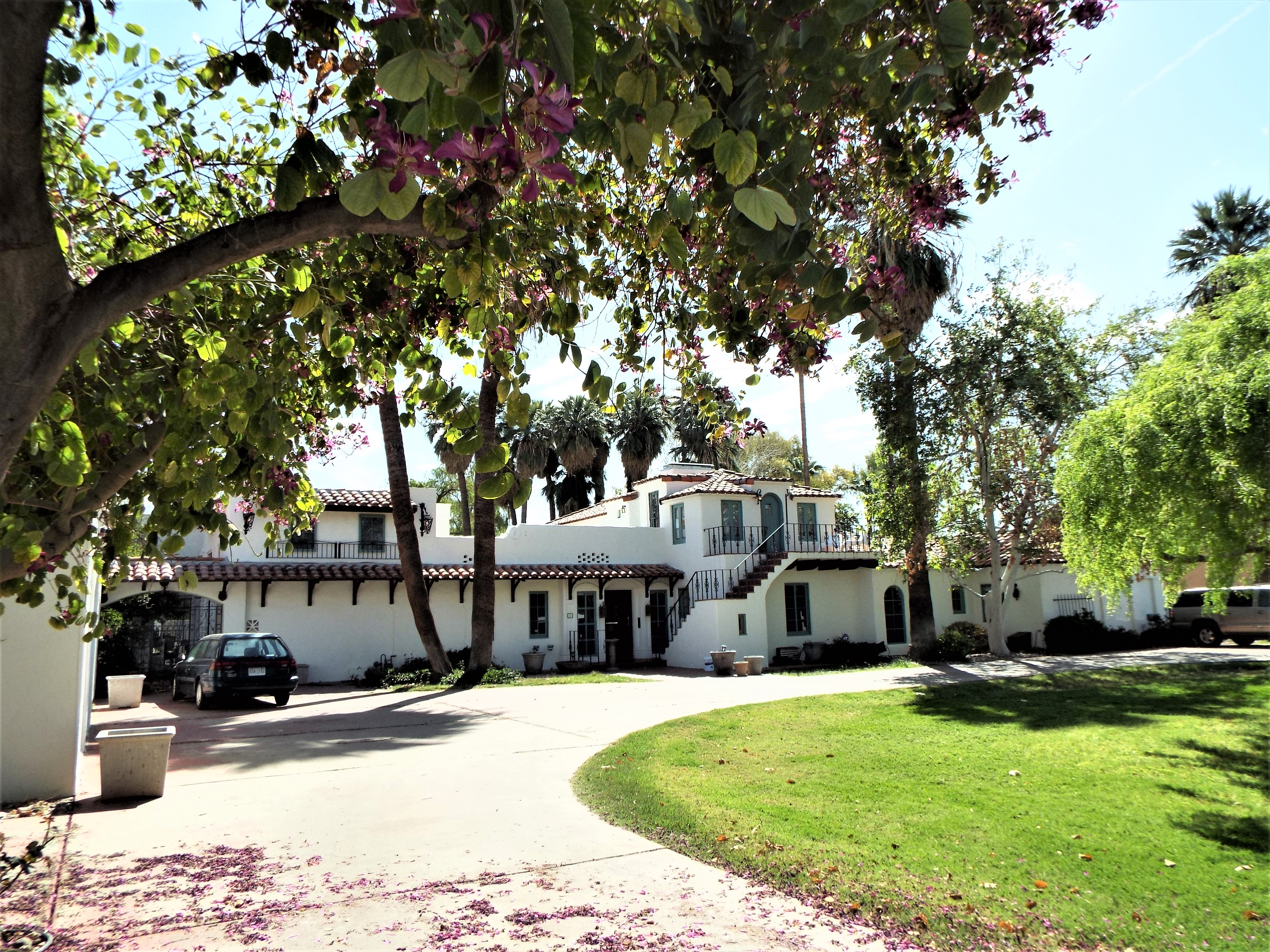
The Colonel Willard H. McCormack House was built in 1929 and is located at 85 North Country Club Dr. The house was listed in the National Register of Historic Places on March 13, 2020; reference: #100005074

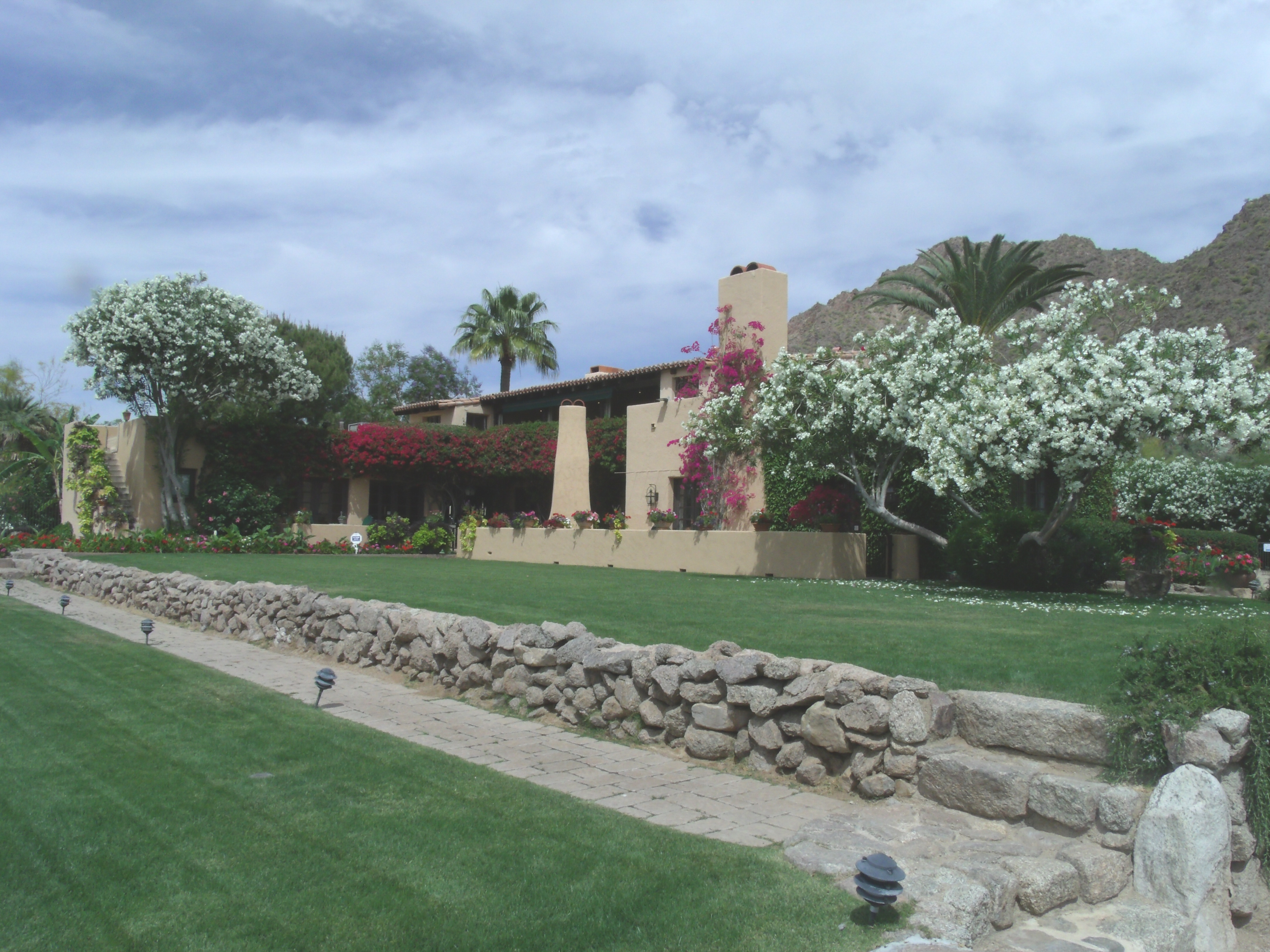
The Neil H. Gates House was built in 1929 and located at 4602 N. Elsie Avenue. It was listed in the National Register of Historic Places on August 11, 1986, reference #86002646.

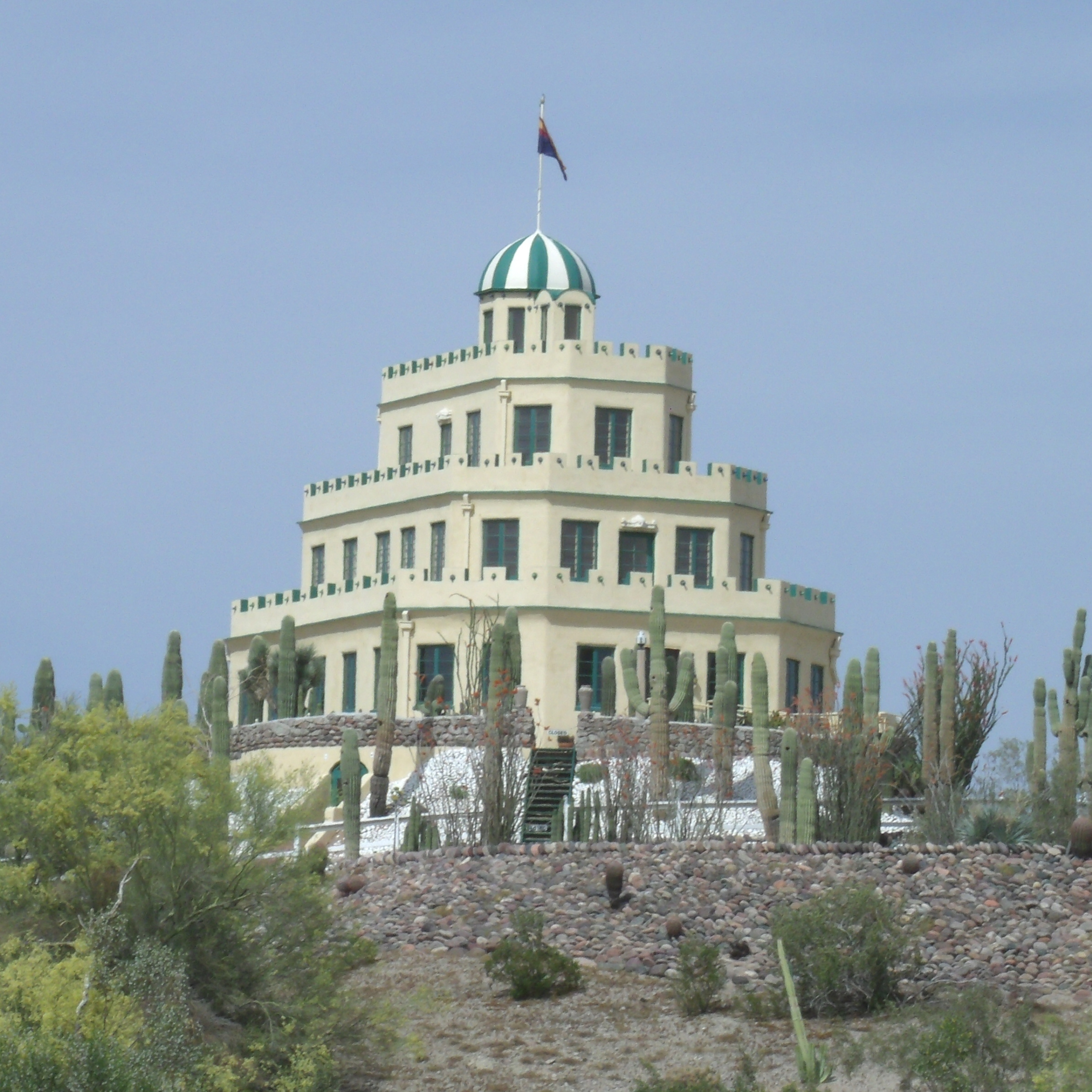
The Tovrea Castle was built between December 1929 and January 1931 and is located at 5041 E. Van Buren St. 'the house is listed on the National Register of Historic Places on Oct. 1, 1996.

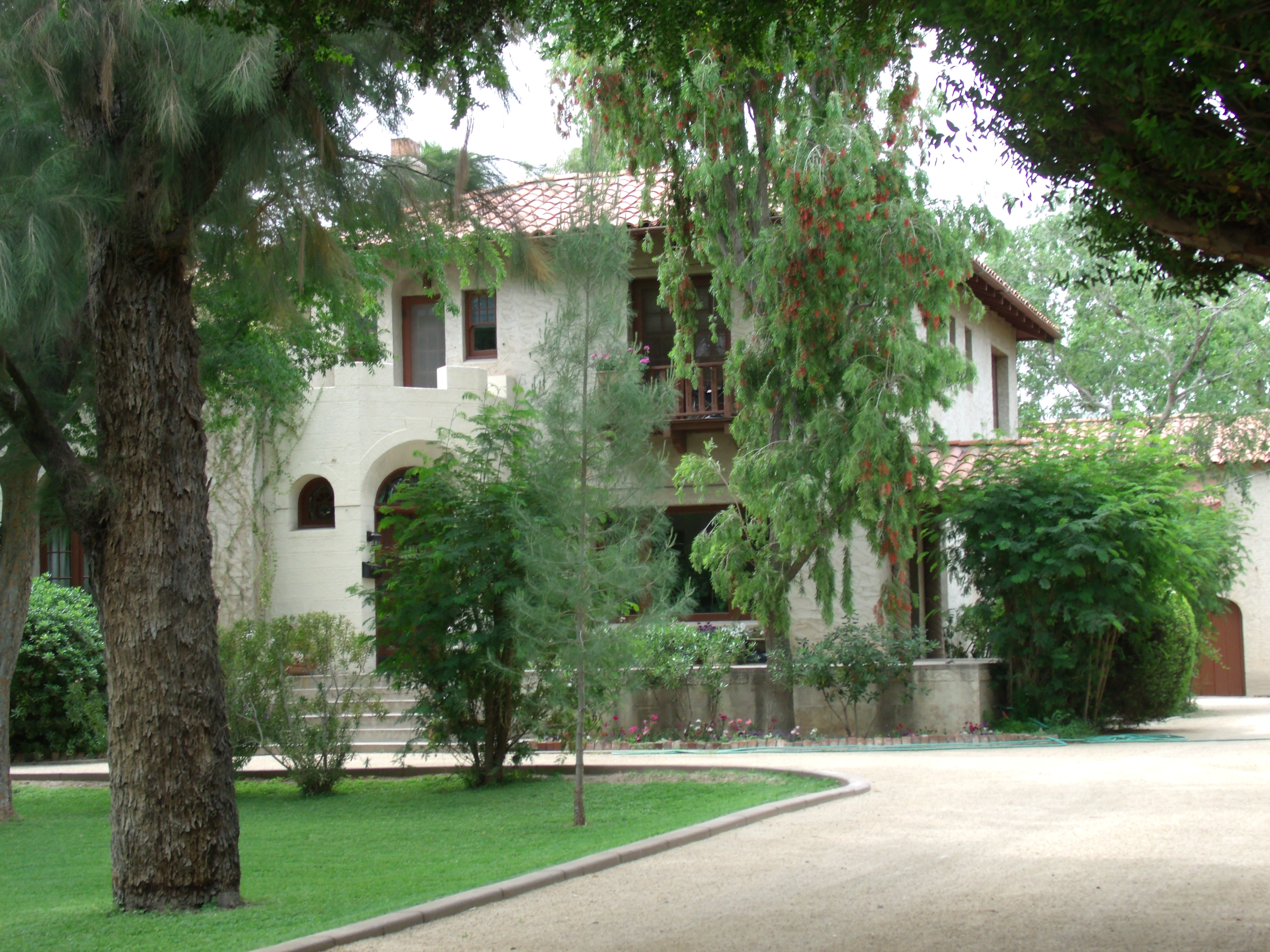
The Judge Fred C. Jacobs House was built in 1928 and is located at 6224 N. Central Avenue. The house is listed on the National Register of Historic Places.

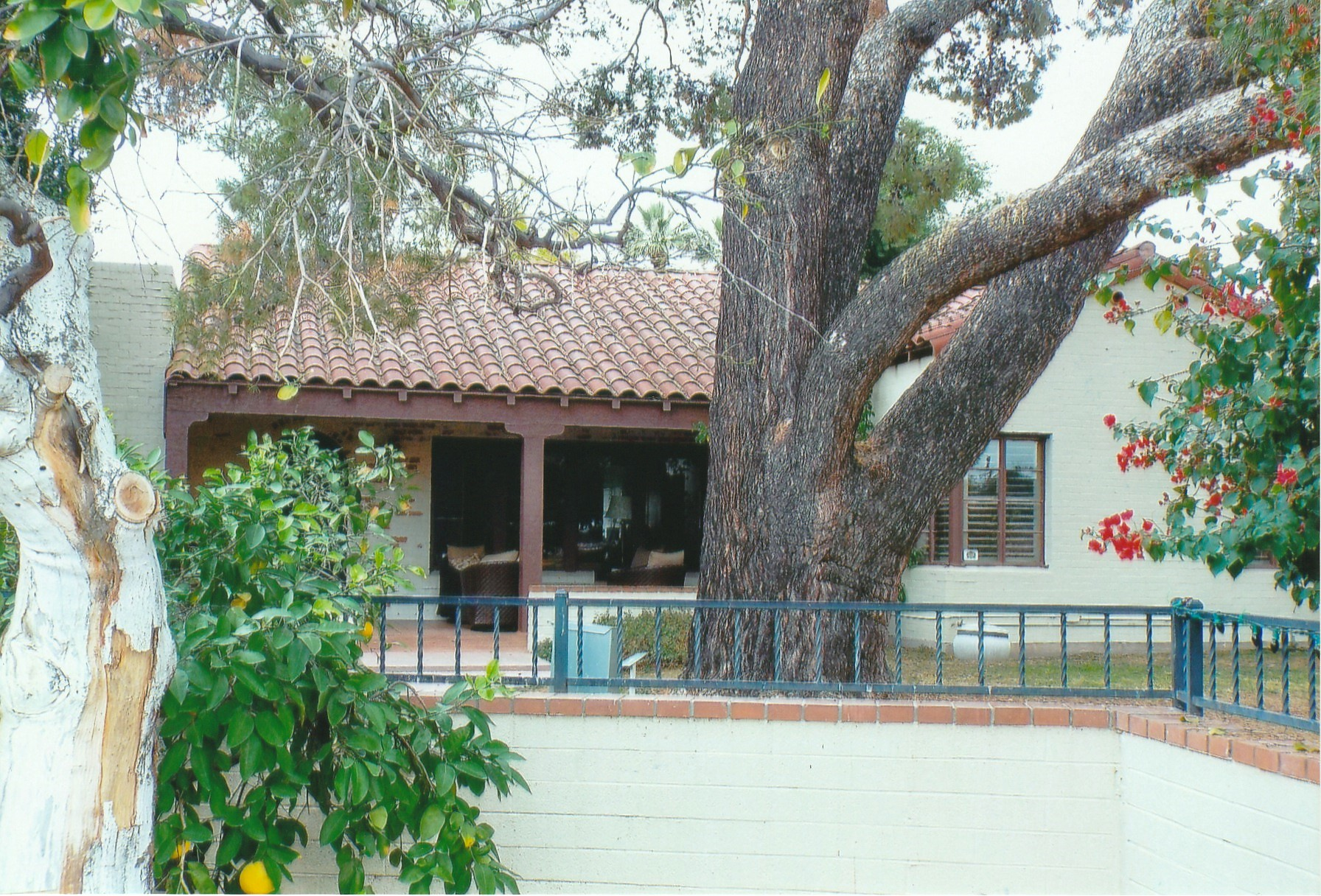
The Neil and Louise House was built in 1929 and is located at 5725 North 20th Place. It was listed in the National Register of Historic Places on November 22, 2016, reference #16000782.

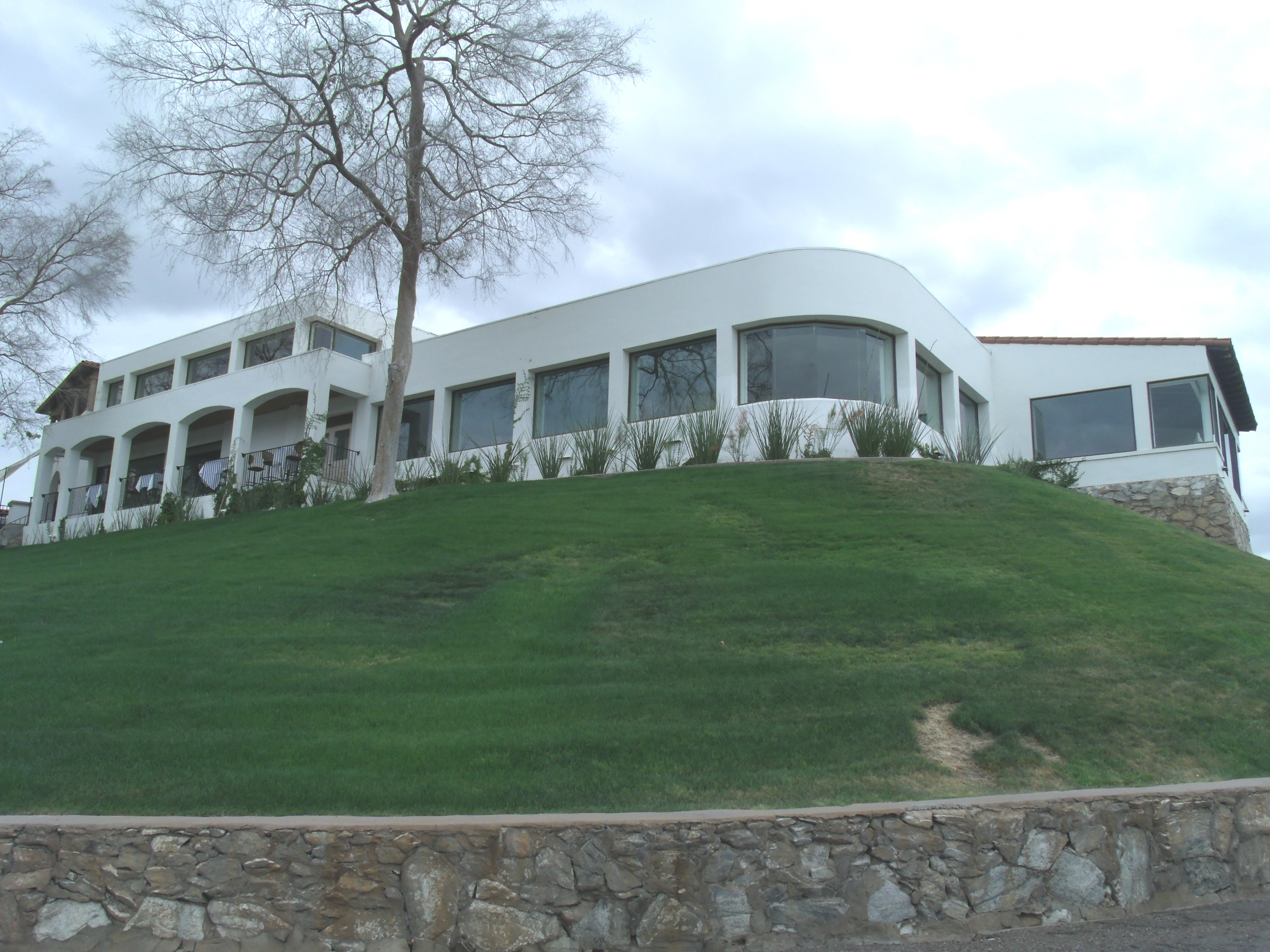
The Wrigley Mansion was built between 1929 and 1931. It is located at 2501 East Telewa Trail. The historic mansion was built by chewing-gum magnate William Wrigley Jr. It is also known as "La Colina Solana". The mansion has been designated as a Phoenix Point of Pride. The mansion was listed as the "William Wrigley Jr., Winter Cottage" on the National Register of Historic Places on August 16, 1989, ref.: #89001045.

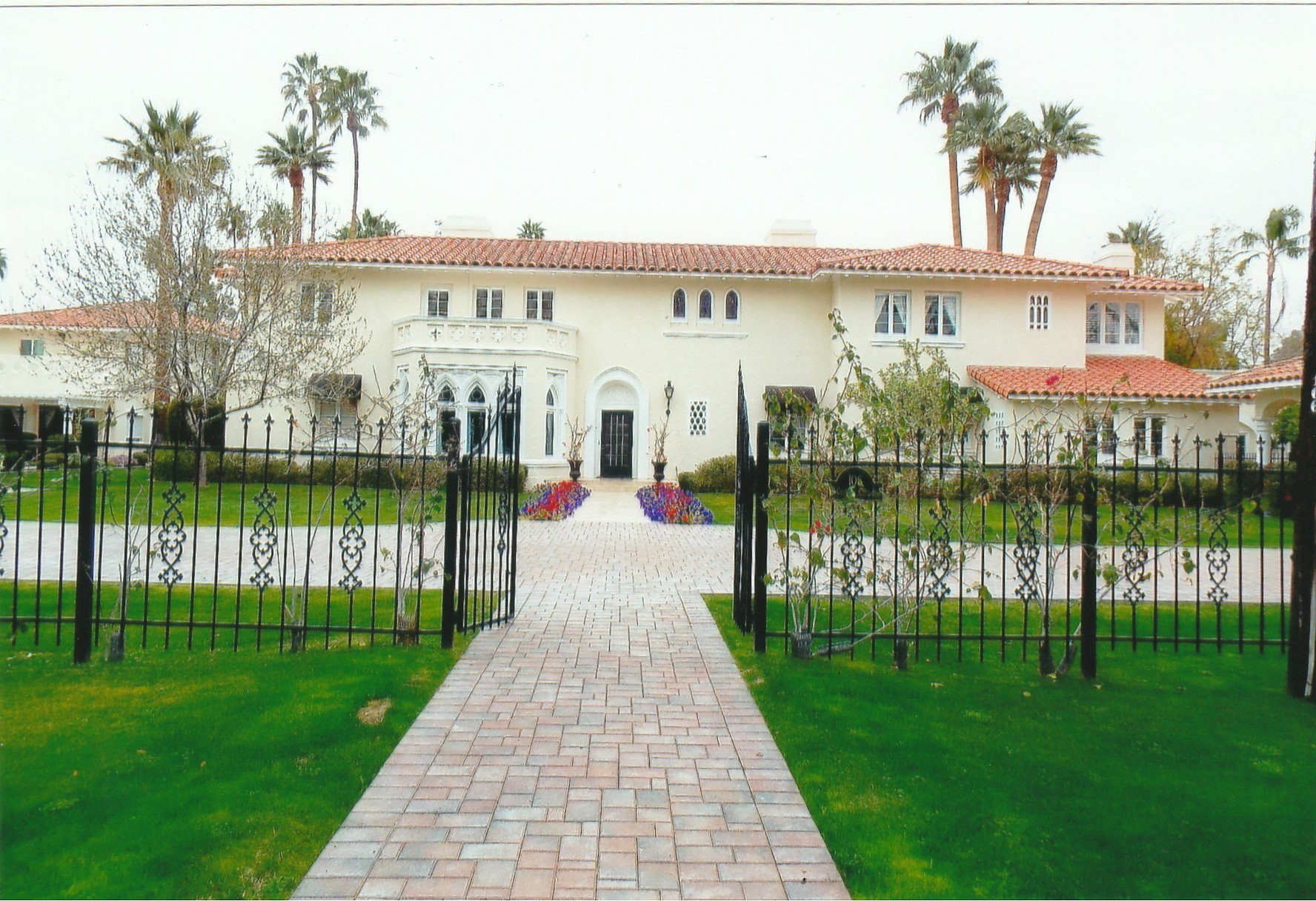
The Fred G. Hilvert House was built in 1929 and is located at 106 E. Country Club Drive. It was listed in the National Register of Historic Places on October 11, 2016, reference #16000700.

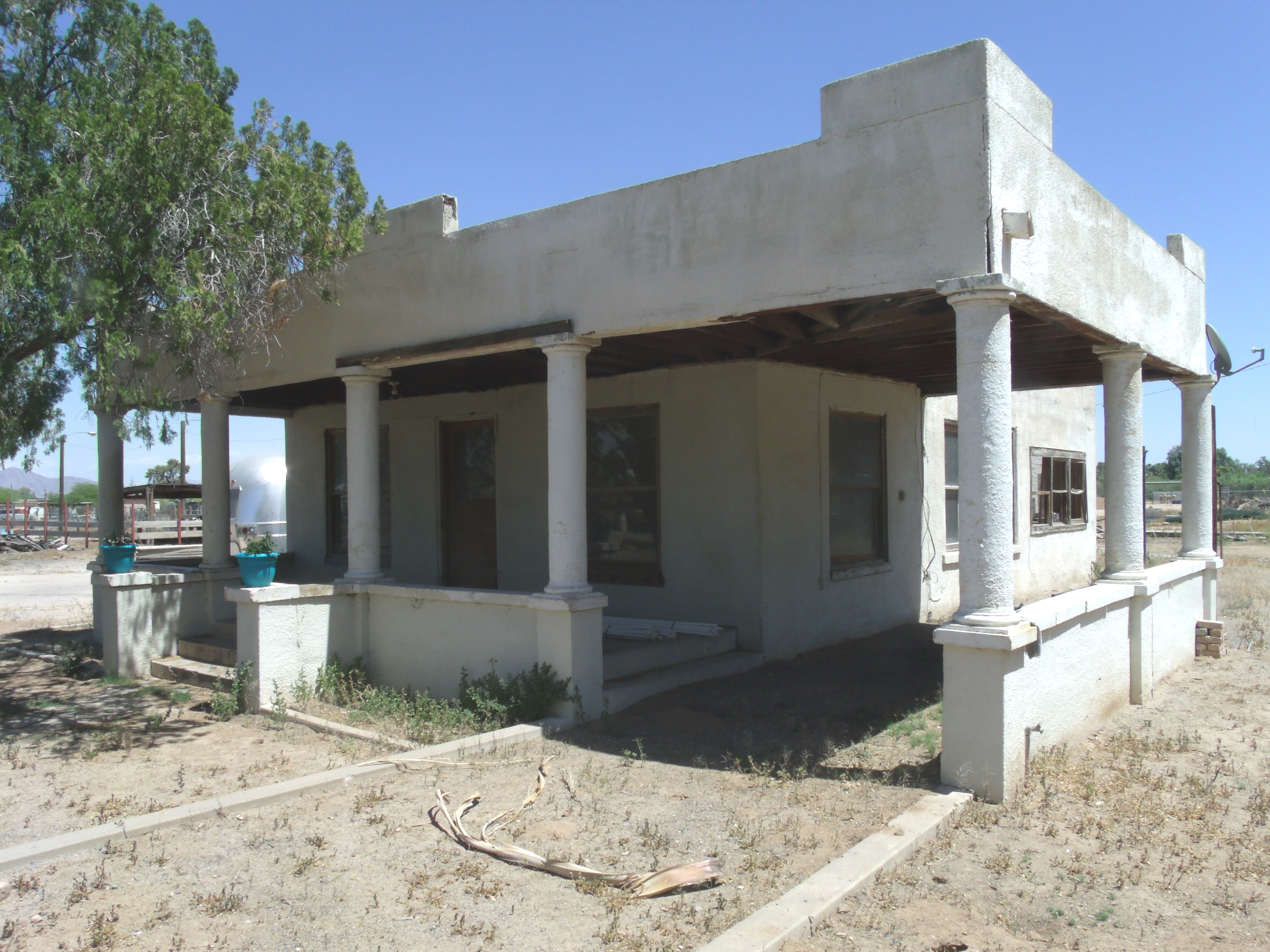
The Spanish Colonial Revival Residence located at 6451 S. 28th St. was built in 1930. It was listed in the Phoenix Historic Property Register in March 2008.

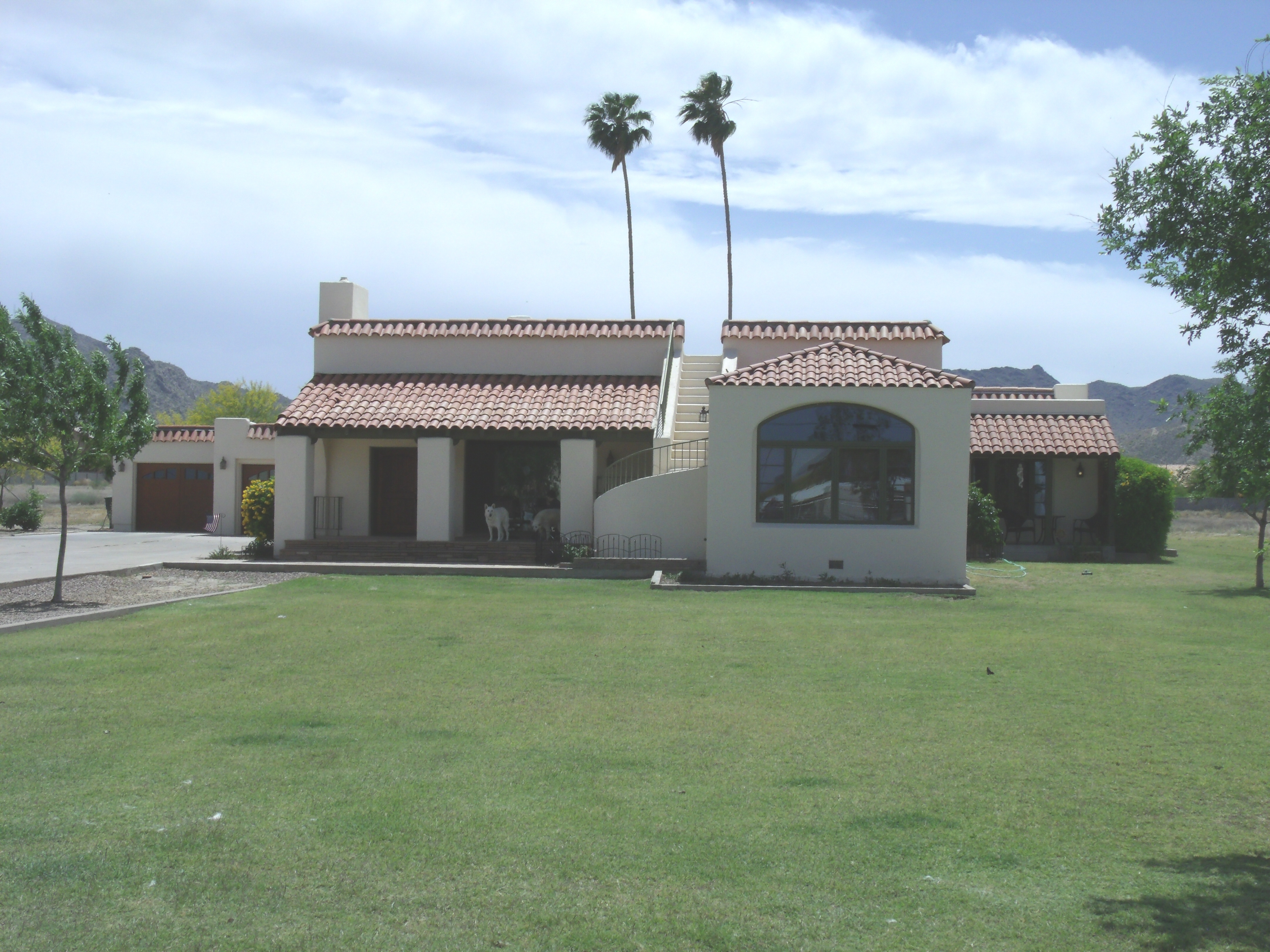
The Ralph H. Stoughton Estate house was built in 1930 and is located at 805 W. South Mountain Avenue. It was listed in the Phoenix Historic Property Register in May 1990 and in the National Register of Historic Places on July 3, 1986, reference #85001475. Boundary adjustments were made in June 2006. It was relisted in the Phoenix Historic Property Register in October 2010.

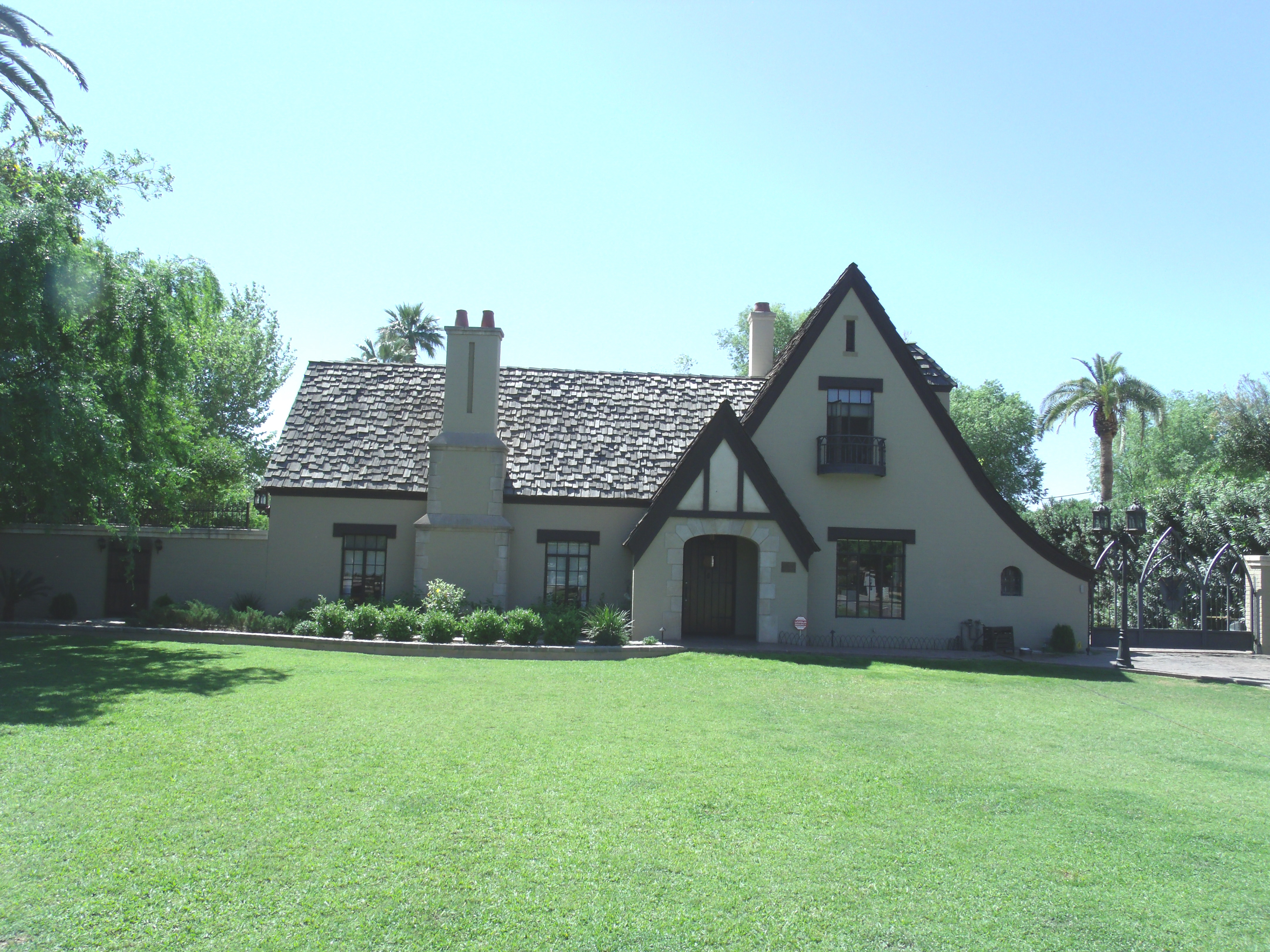
The Lester DeMund House was built in 1930 and is located at 363 E. Monte Vista Road. It was listed in the National Register of Historic Places on January 6, 1995, reference #94001520.

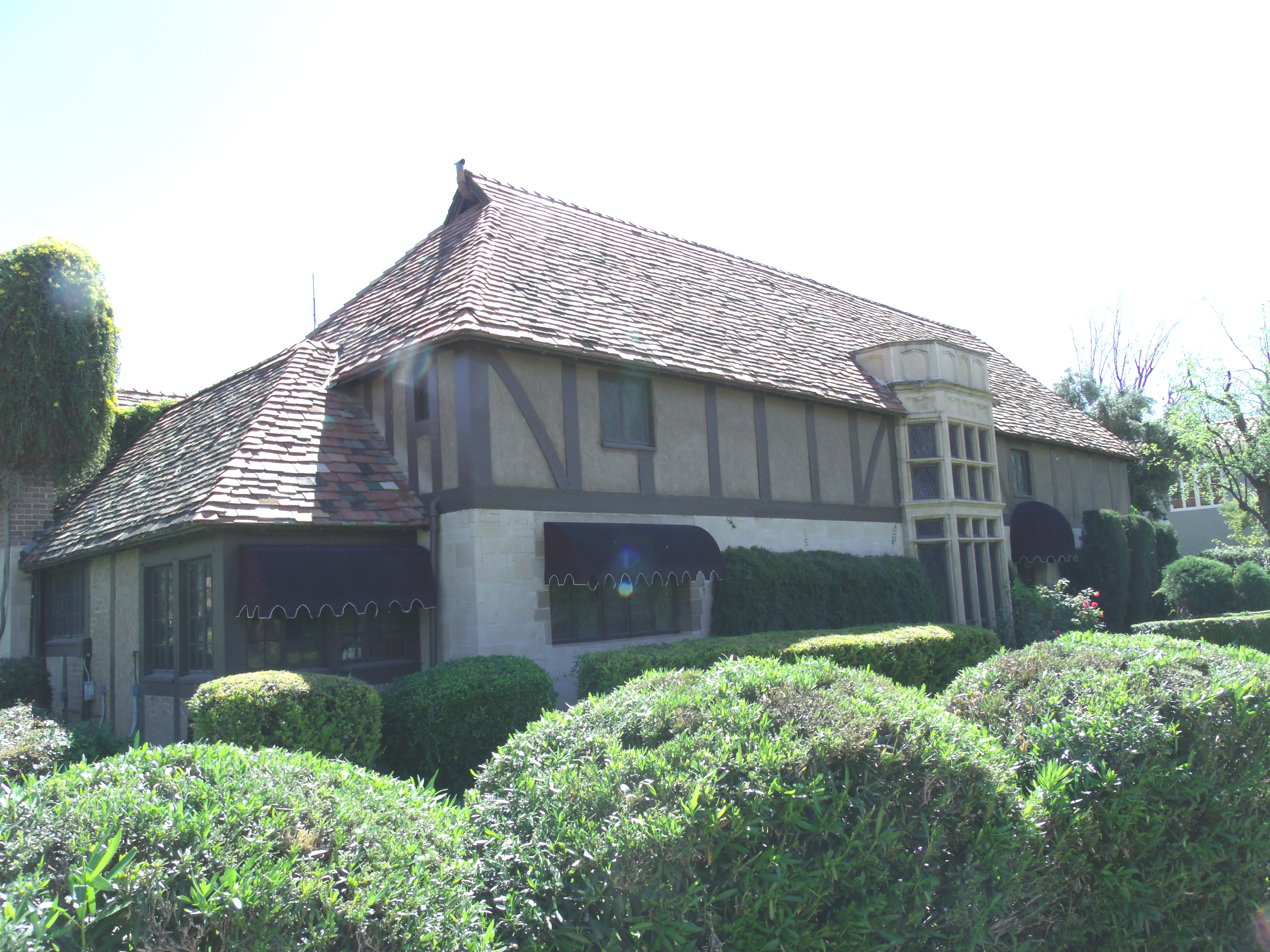
The Carter W. Gibbes House was built in 1930 and is located at 2233 N. Alvarado Road. It was listed in the National Register of Historic Places on August 25, 1983, reference #83002992.

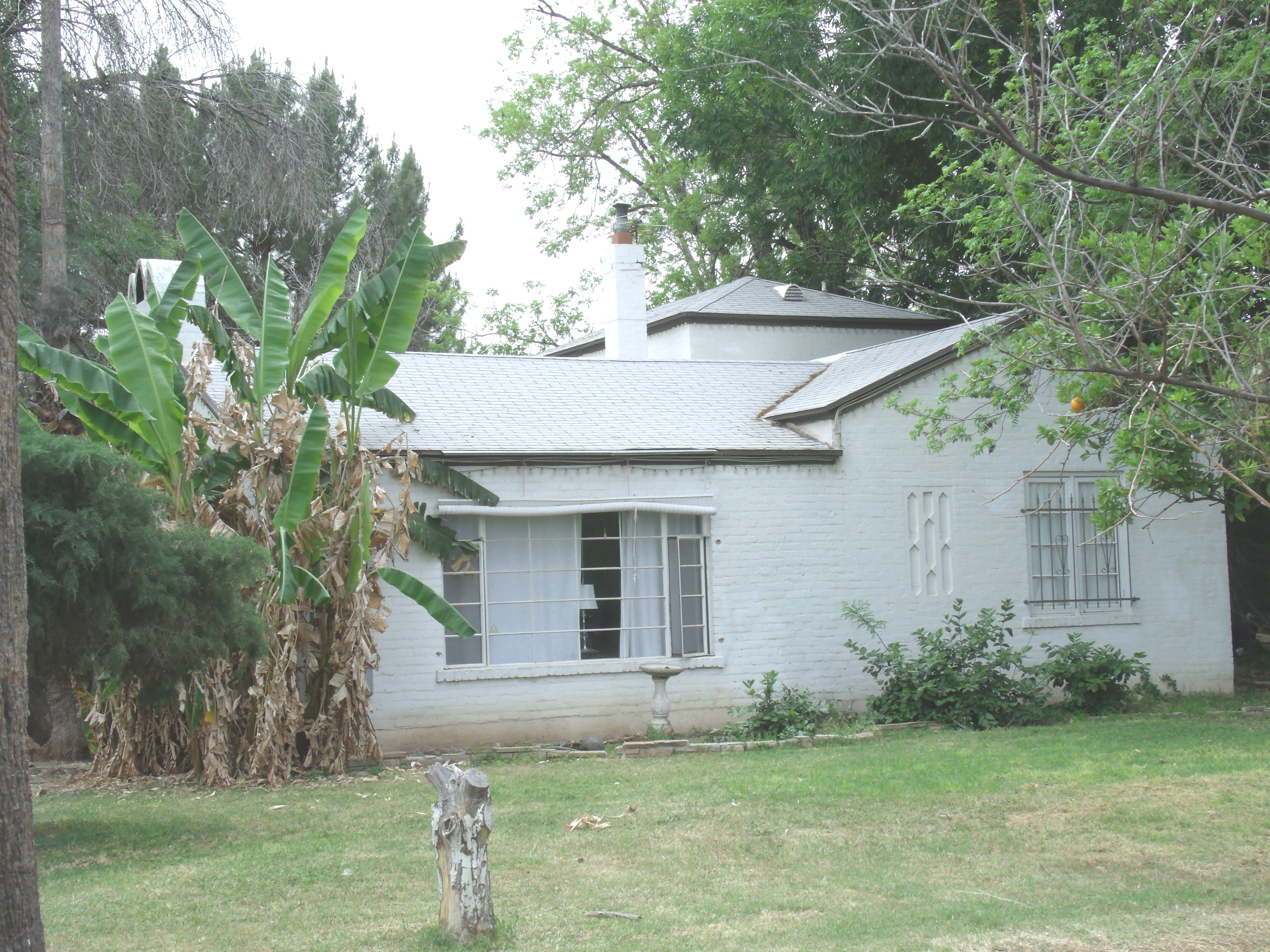
The Spanish Colonial Revival Residence located at 133 E. Carter Road was built in 1930. It was listed in the Phoenix Historic Property Register in July 1993.

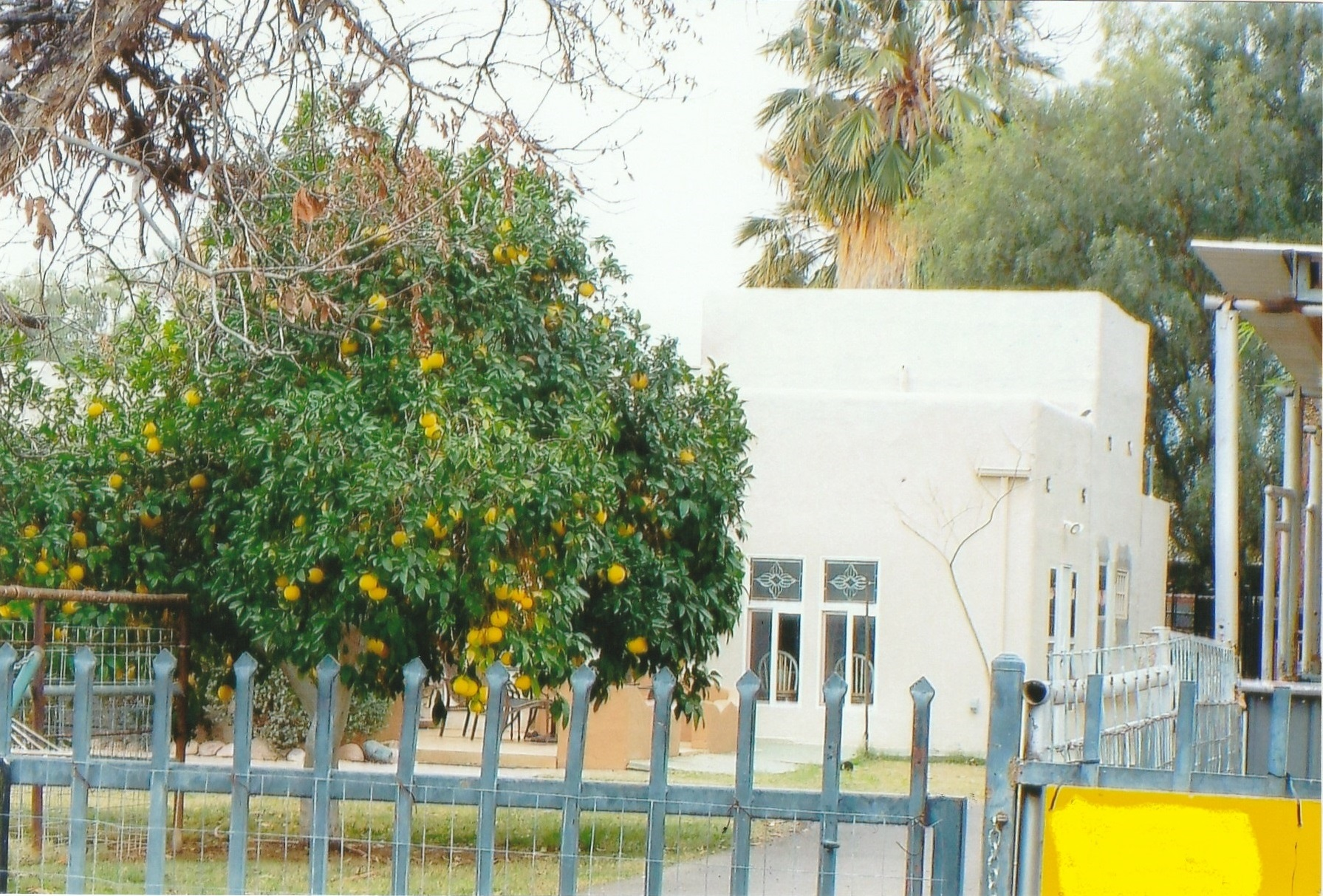
The Pueblo Revival House was built in 1930 and is located at 8040-50 S. 14th Street. It was listed in The Phoenix Historic Property Register in March 2008

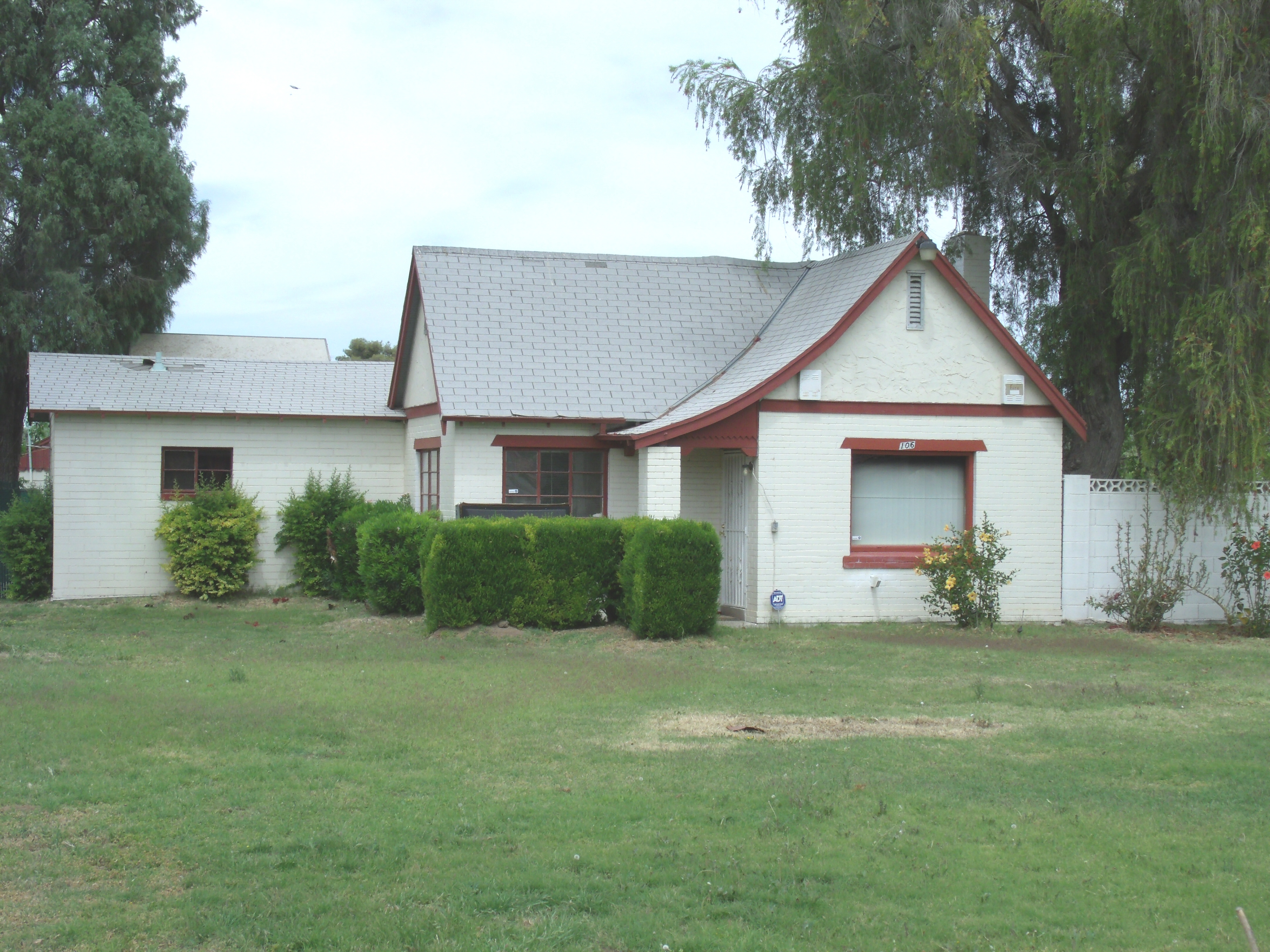
The Tudor Revival Residence located at 106 E. Greenway Road was built in 1931. It was listed in the Phoenix Historic Property Register in July 1993.

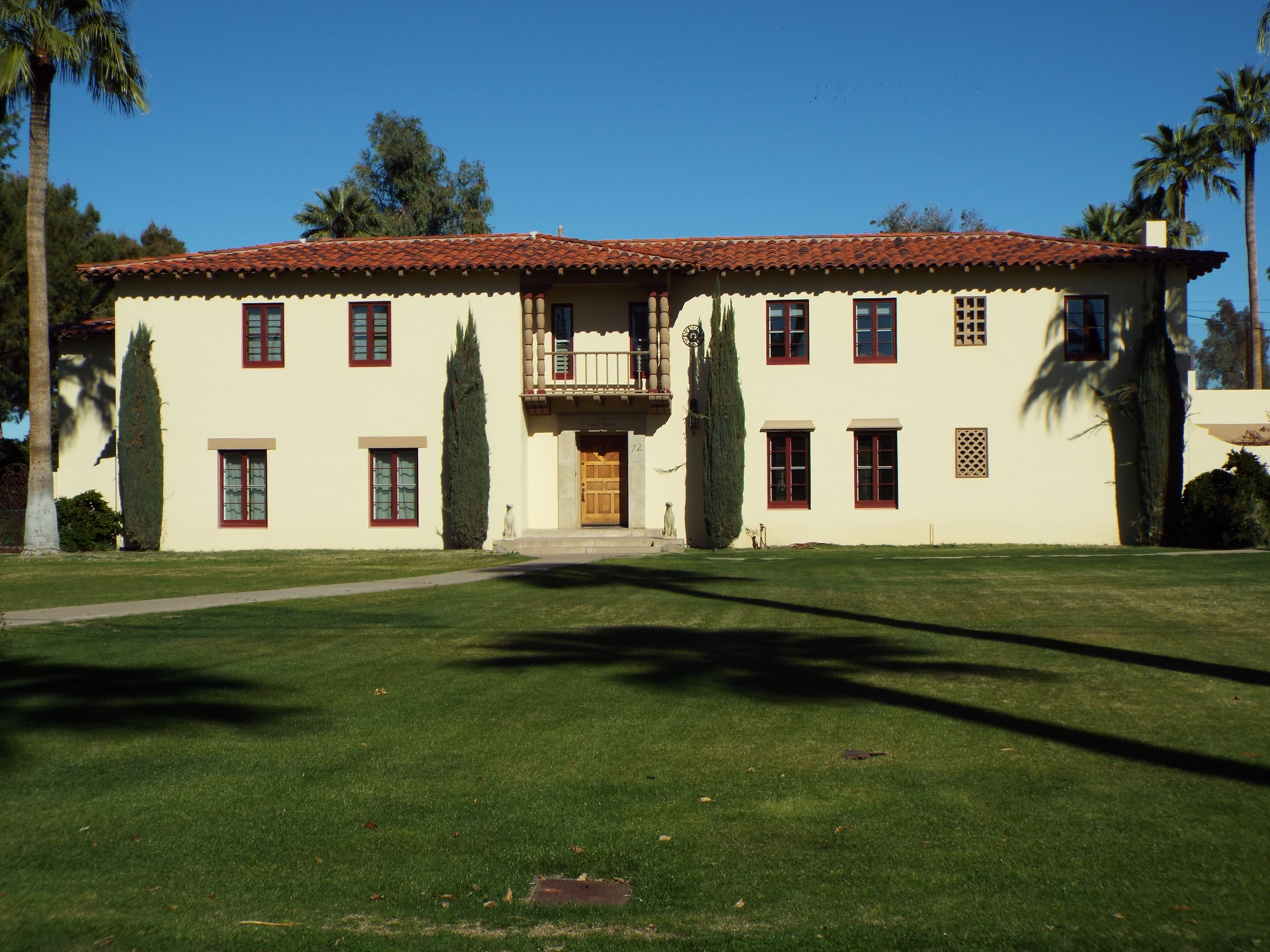
The Borah Mansion located at 72 E. Country Club Dr. It was listed in the National Register of Historic Places on March 15, 2015, reference: #100002209.

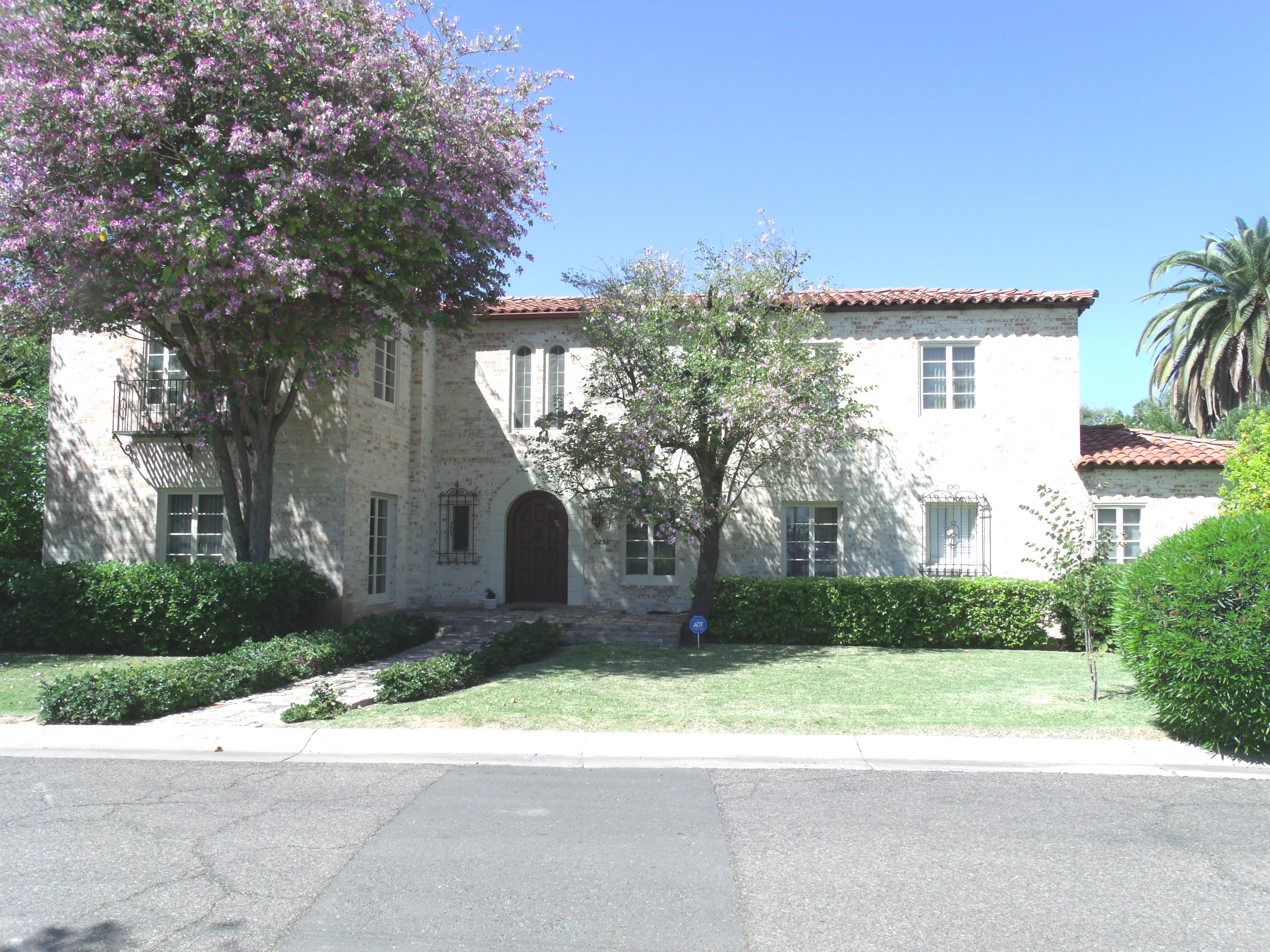
The William K. Humbert House was built in 1932 and is located at 2238 N. Alvarado Road. It was listed in the National Register of Historic Places on December 1, 1983, reference #83003476.

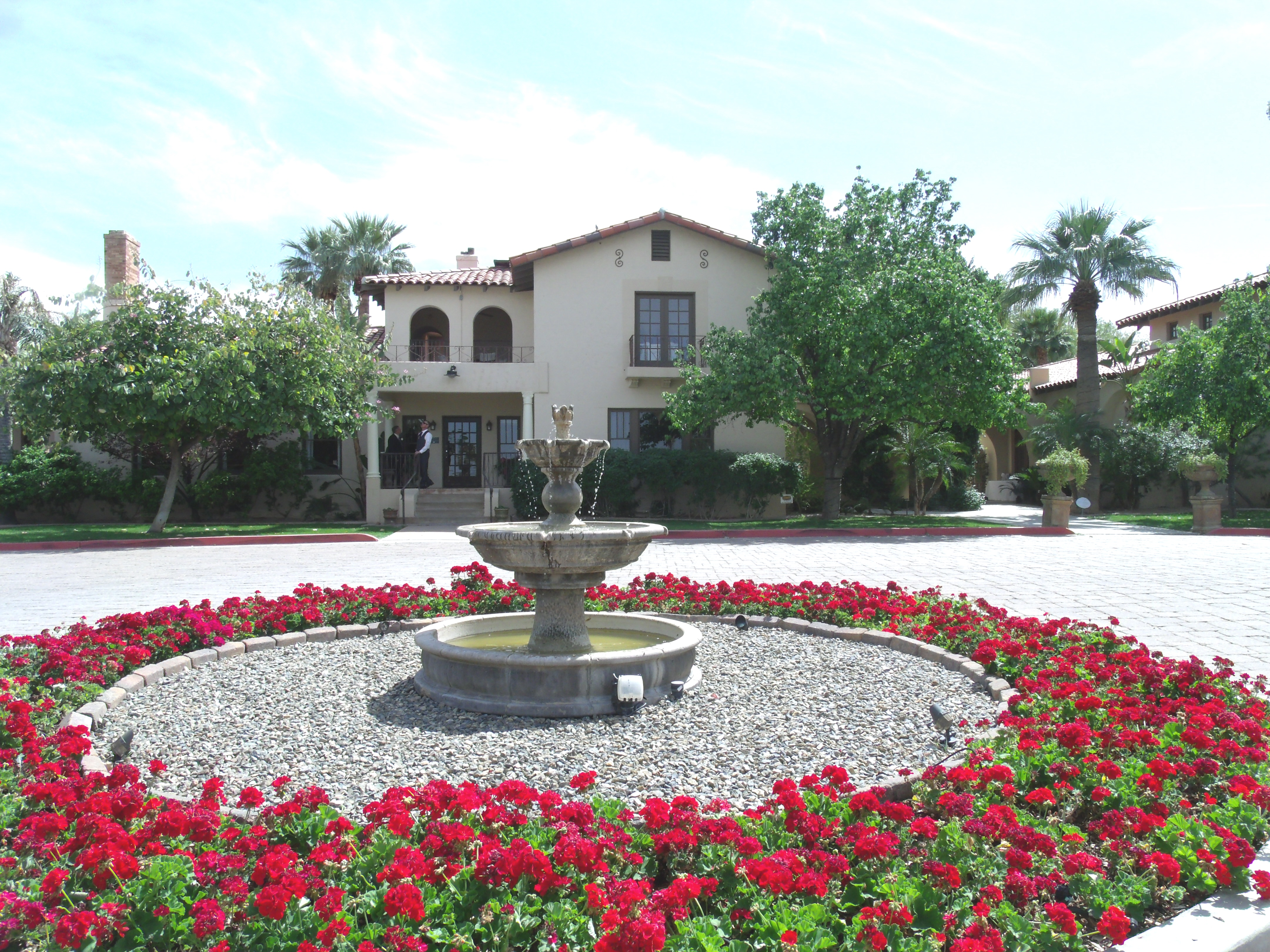
The Walter Strong House was built in 1929 and is located at 2501 E. Baseline Road. The property was listed in the Phoenix Historic Property Register in March 1993.

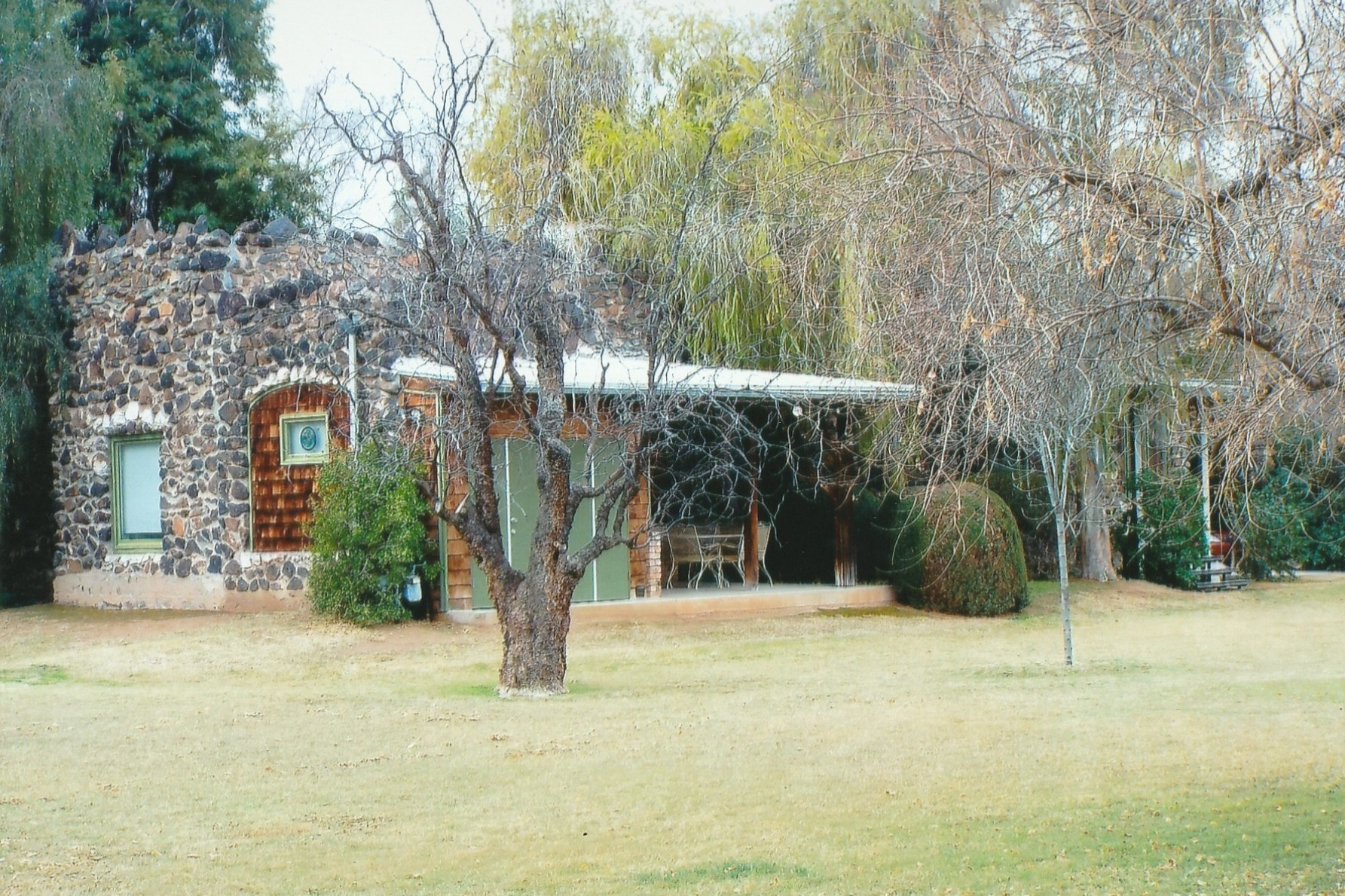
The Franklin Hilgeman House was built in 1933 and is located at 333 West Loma Lane. It was listed in the National Register of Historic Places on June 26, 2017, reference #100001229

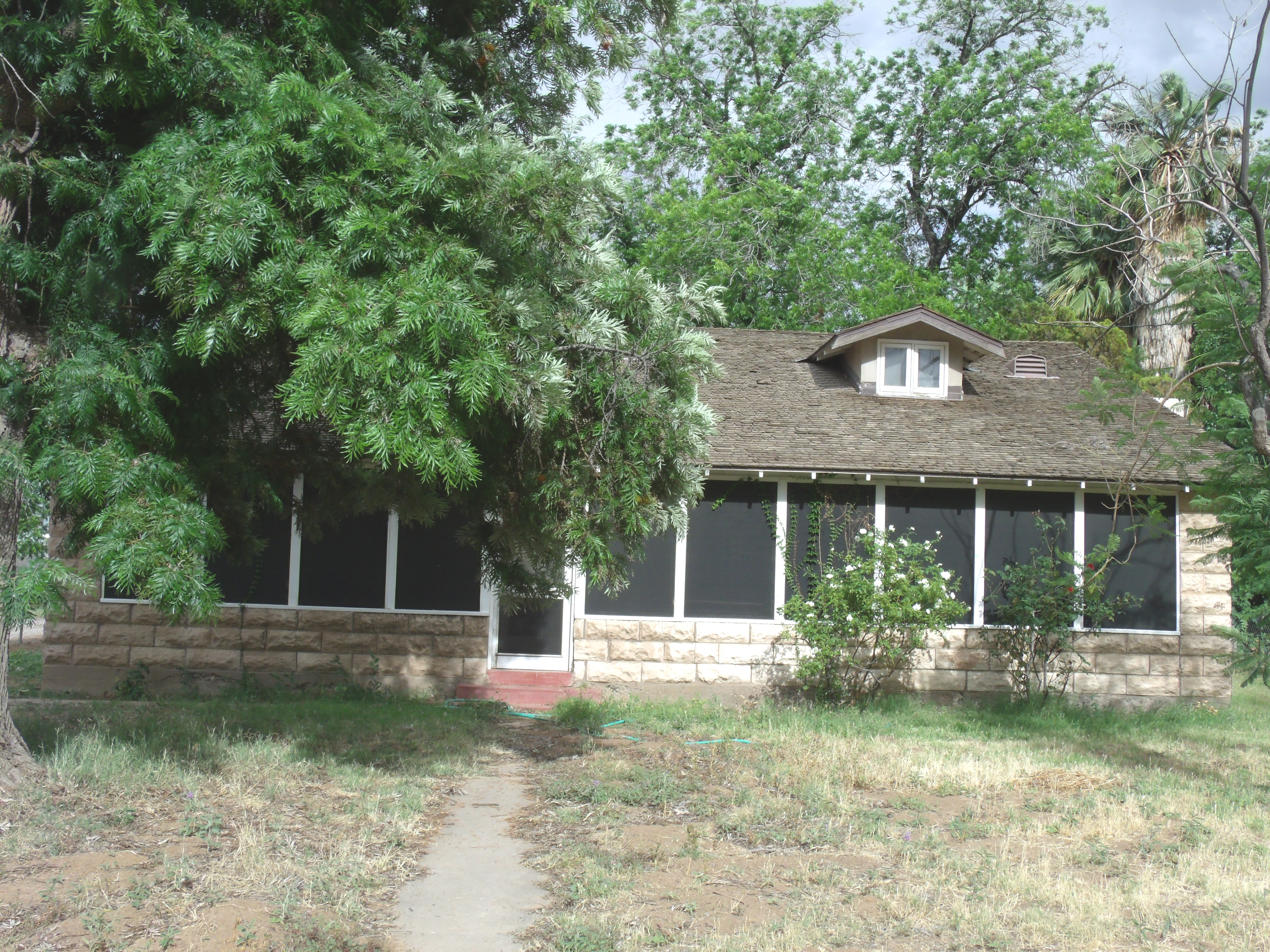
The Bungalow Farm Residence was built ib 1935 and is located at 6413 S. 26th St. It was listed in the Phoenix Historic Property Register in January 1993.

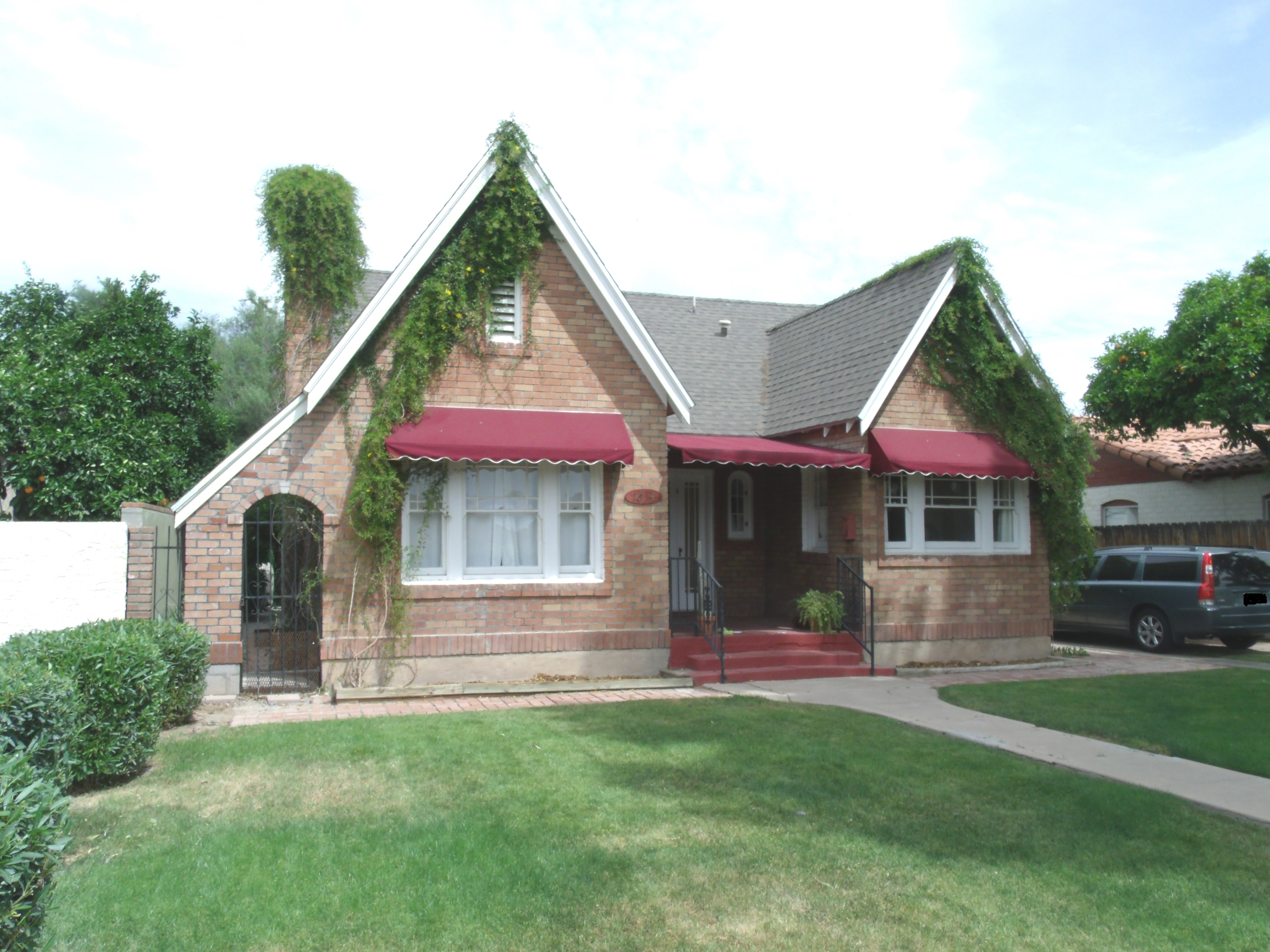
The Tudor Revival Residence, located at 1614 W. Vernon Avenue, was built in 1936. It is listed in the Del Norte Historic District of the Phoenix Historic Property Register in July 1993. The Del Norte Historic District was also listed in the National Register of Historic Places on December 21, 1994, reference: #94001482.

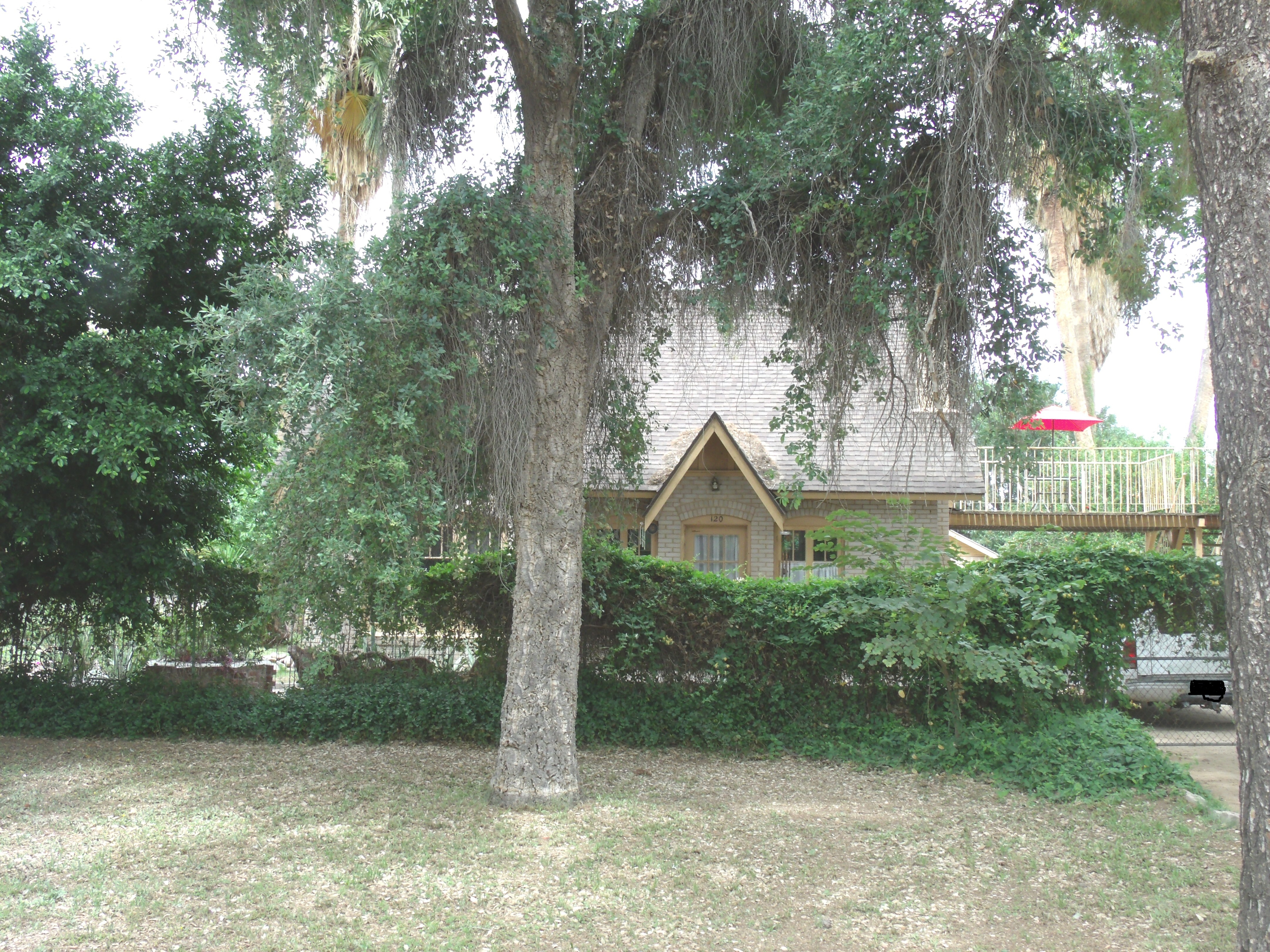
The Tudor Revival Residence, located at 120 E. Carter Road, was built in 1936. It was listed in the Phoenix Historic Property Register in July 1993.

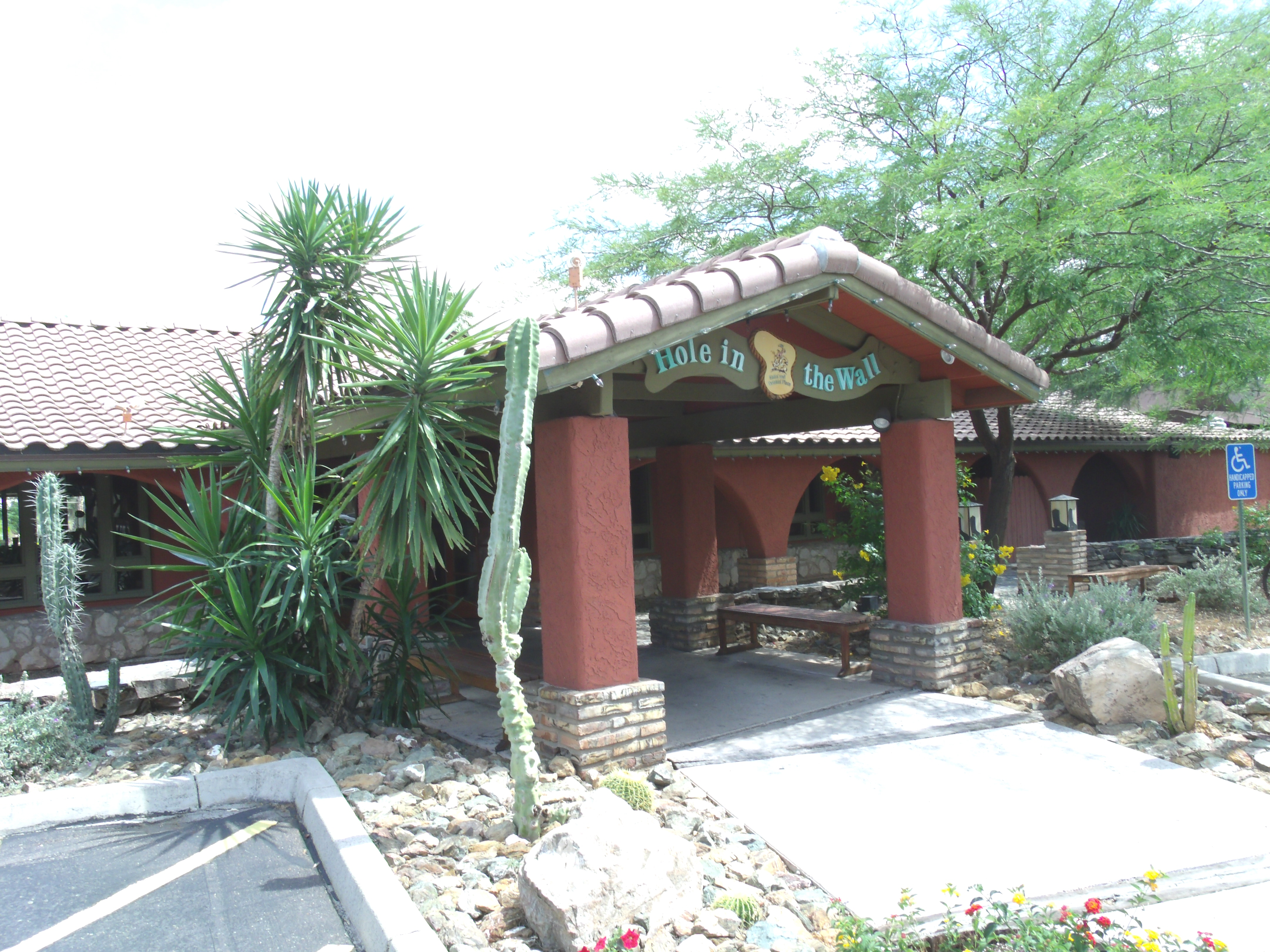
The Main Ranch House of what once was a ranch in the base of Squaw Peak Mountain. The house, which has been converted into a restaurant, was built in the 1940s and is the oldest property located within the terrain of the Pointe Hilton Squaw Peak Resort, which was built in 1977. Both are located at 7677 North 16th Street.

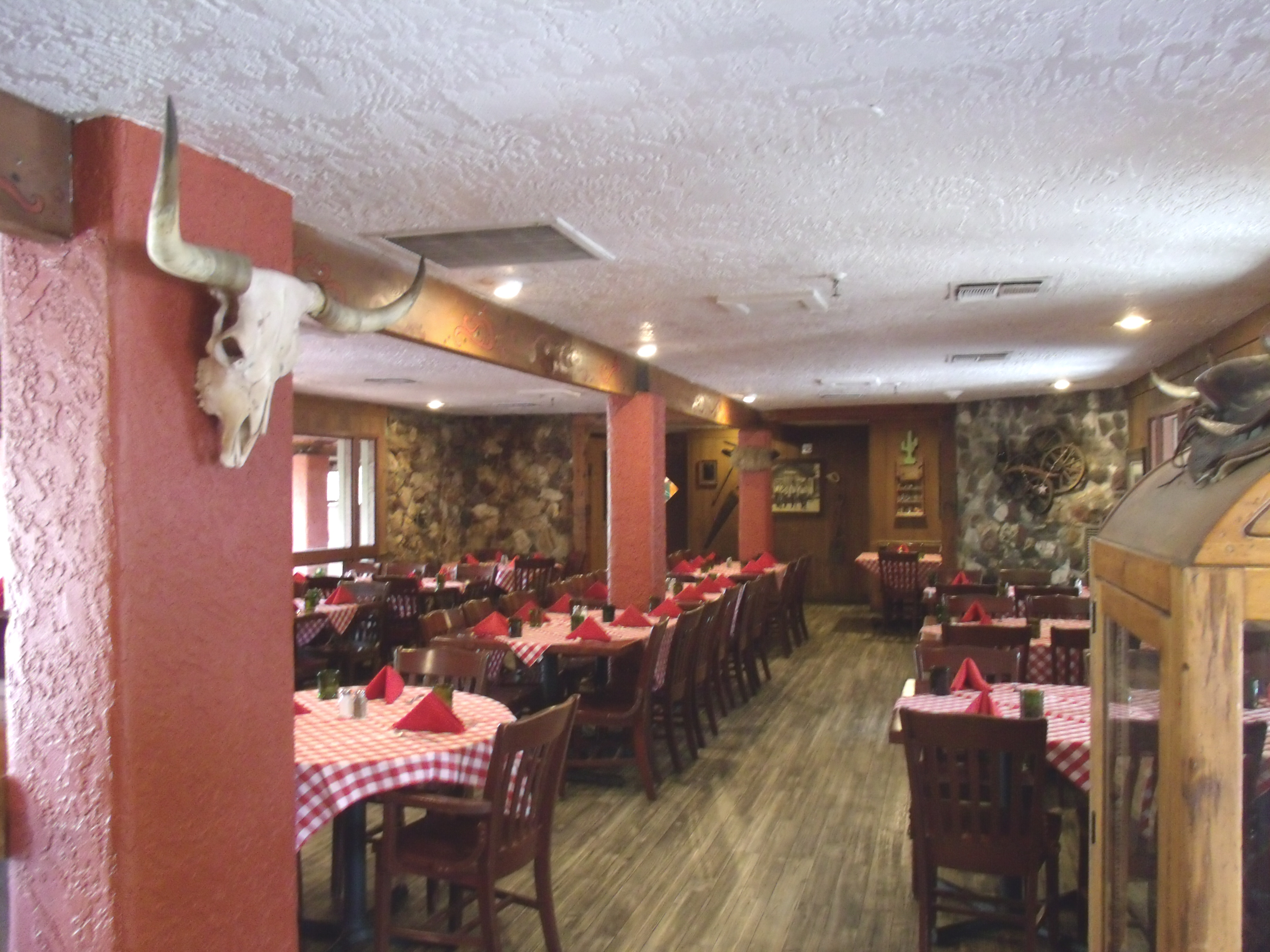
Inside the Main Ranch House located within the terrain of the Pointe Hilton Squaw Peak Resort.

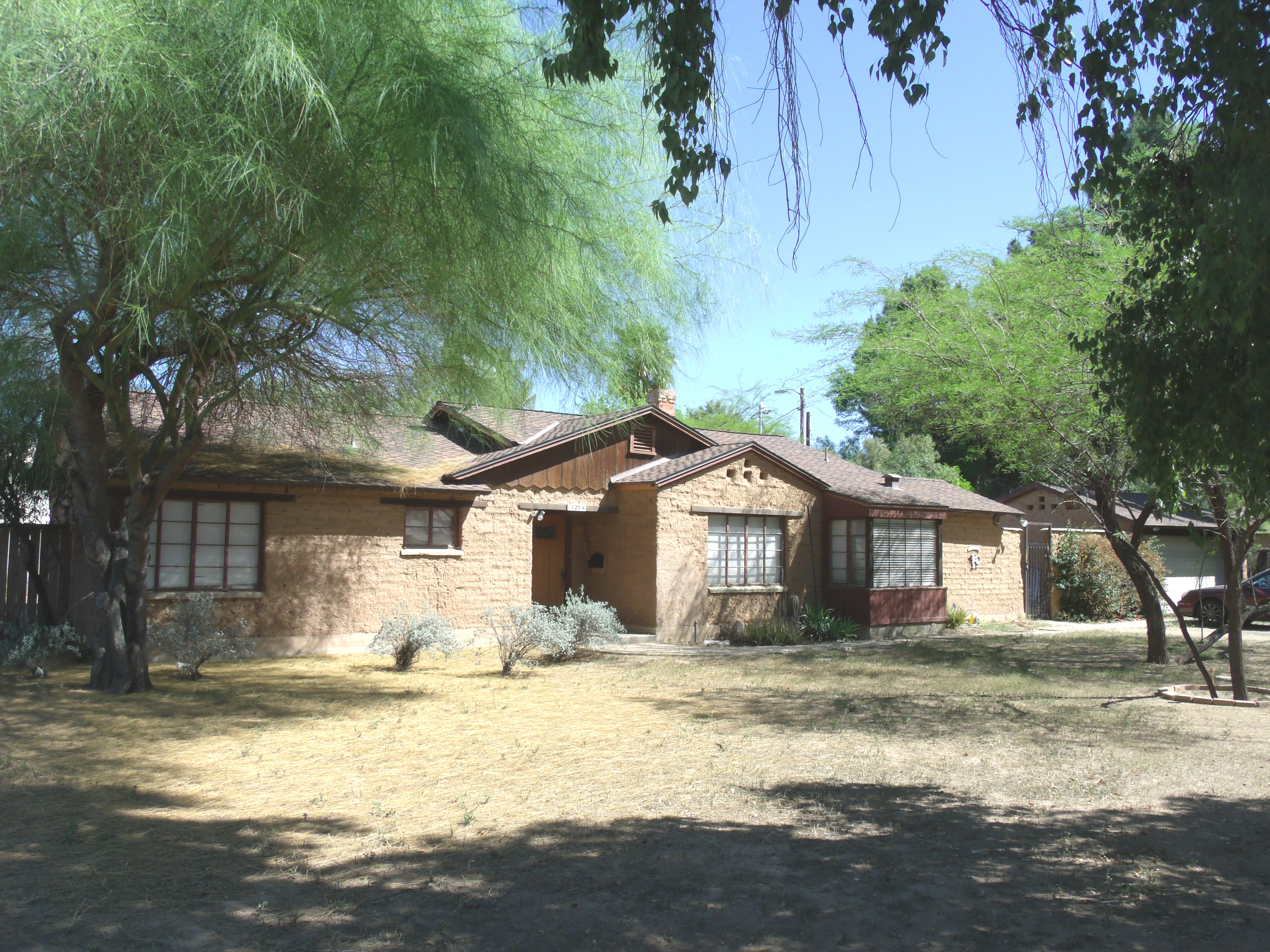
The Daniel & Clara Boone House was built in 1940 and is located at 1720 E. Elm St. It was listed in the Phoenix Historic Property Register in November 2005.

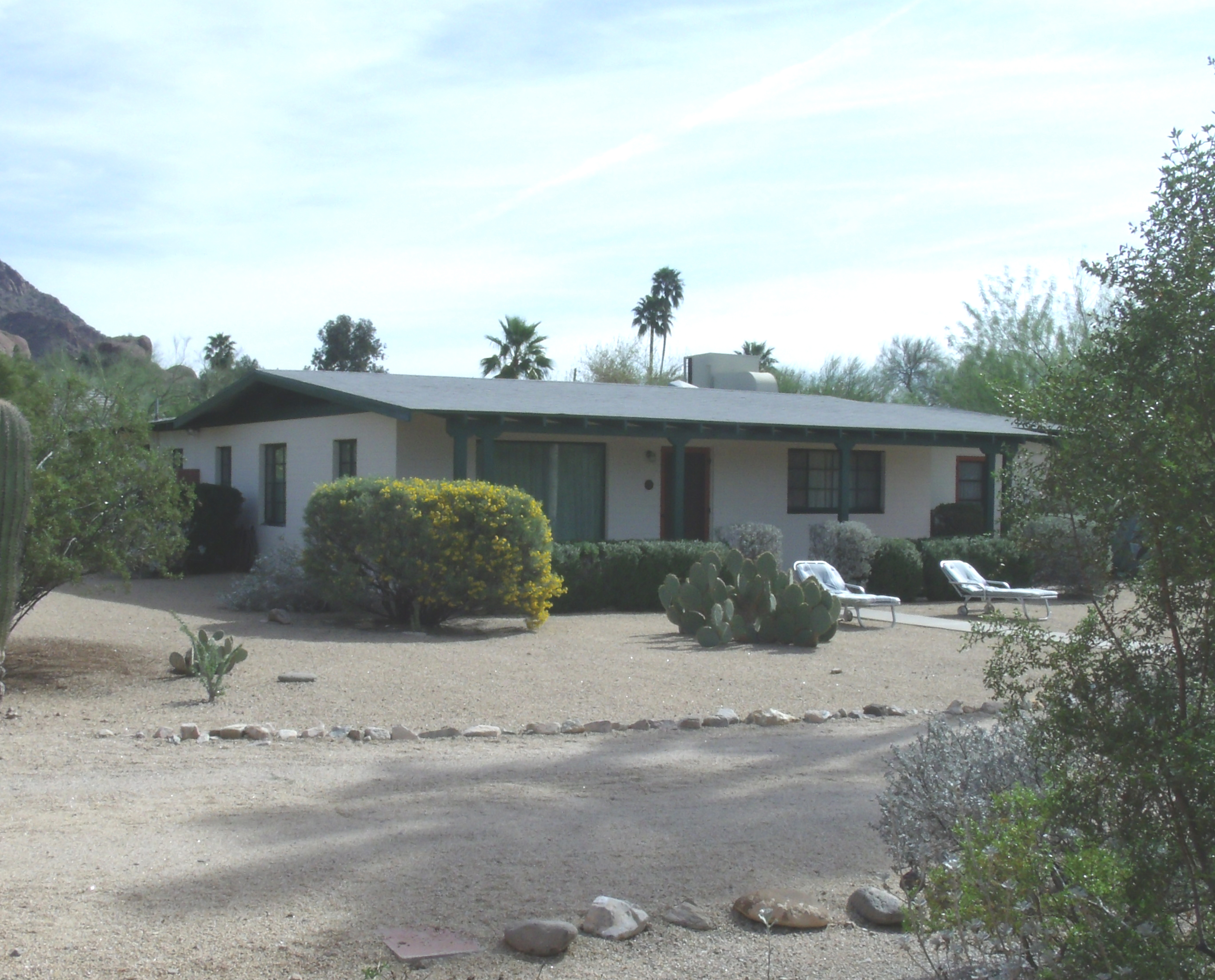
The L. Ron Hubbard House , a.k.a. as the L. Ron Hubbard House at Camelback , was built in 1945 and is located at 5501 N. 44th Street in Phoenix. The house belonged to Lafayette Ronald Hubbard, who was better known as L. Ron Hubbard, an American author who founded the Church of Scientology. The house is listed on the National Register of Historic Places.

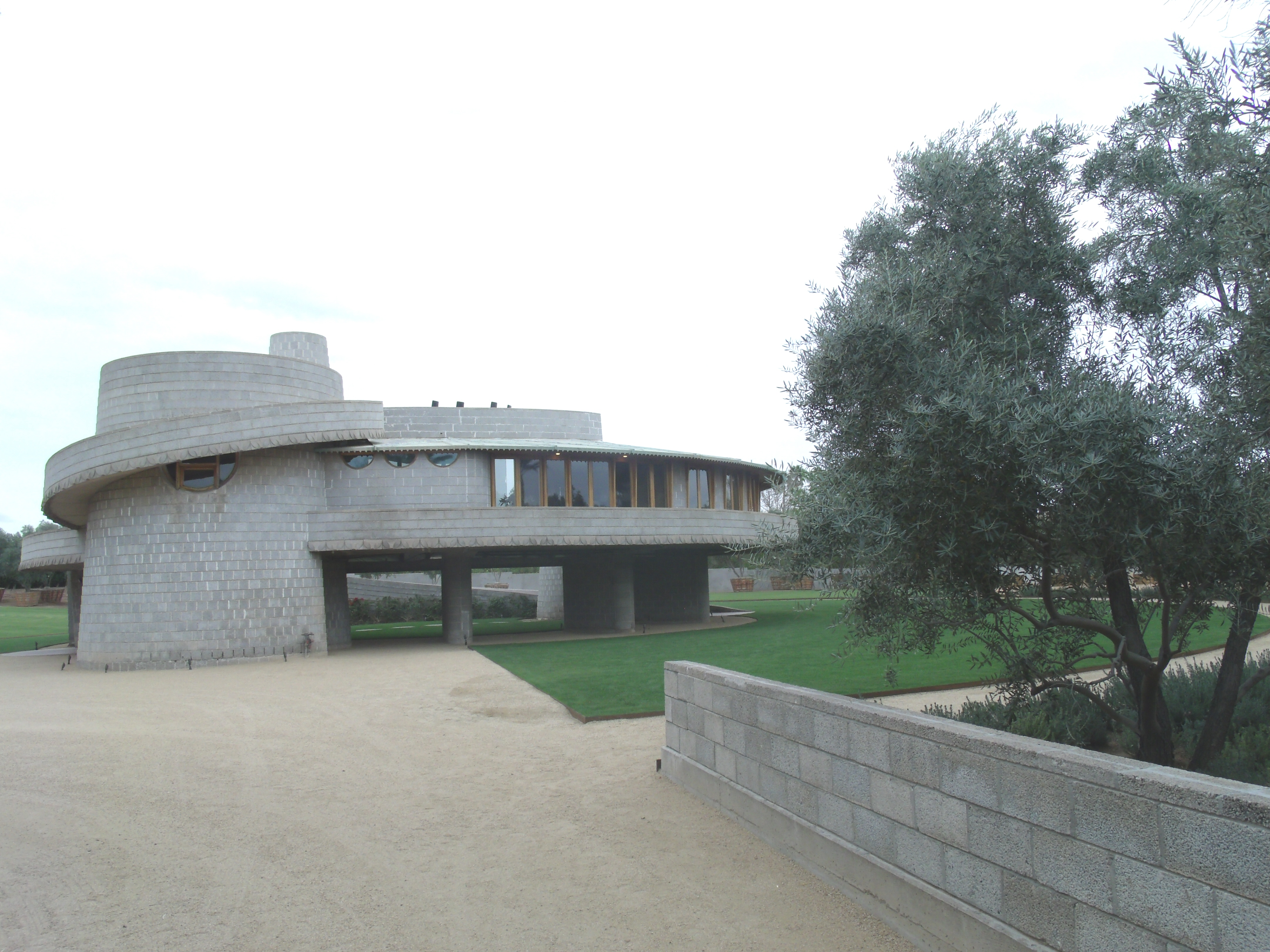
The David and Gladys Wright House was built from 1950-1952 and is located at 5212 East Exeter Boulevard, but currently has an entrance on the 4500 block of North Rubicon Avenue. The house was built in the Arcadia section of Phoenix as part of a Frank Lloyd Wright magazine story circa 1948 on how to live in the desert southwest. Both the circular design and the spiral ramps are features Wright also used in his design of the Solomon R. Guggenheim Museum. After Wright's death in 1959, his son David and daughter-in-law Gladys lived in the home until his death in 1997 at 102 years of age and his widow, Gladys, died in 2008 at 104, outliving their only son, who died at 49 years of age. David and Gladys were the only owners of the home and lived in it their entire lives. As of early 2022 the house has been registered on the national list of historic places.

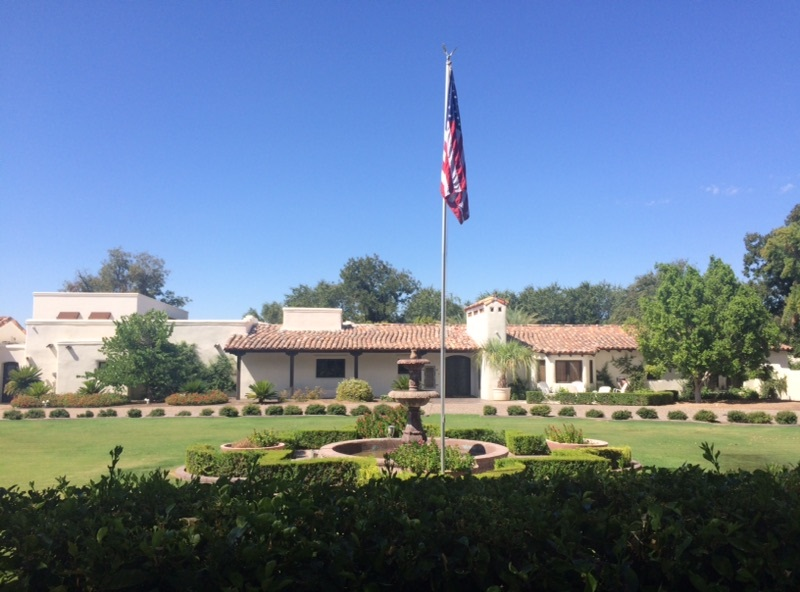
The John and Cindy McCain House built in 1951 and located at 7110 N. Central Avenue.

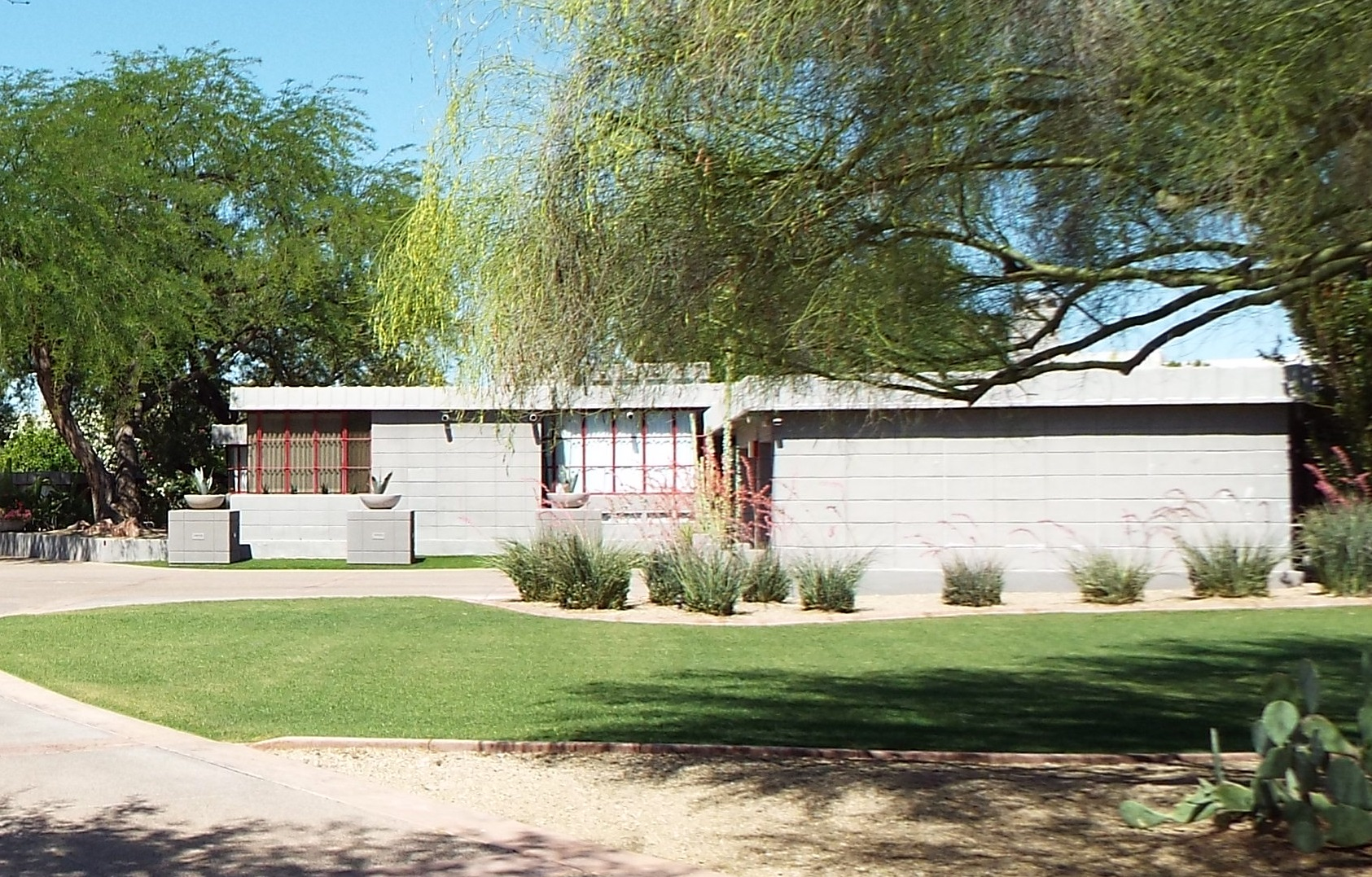
The Benjamin Adelman House was built in 1951 and is located at 5802 N. 30th Street in Phoenix. The house was designed by Frank Lloyd Wright. It was a winter retreat for the Adelman's who owned a laundry business in Milwaukee, Wisconsin.

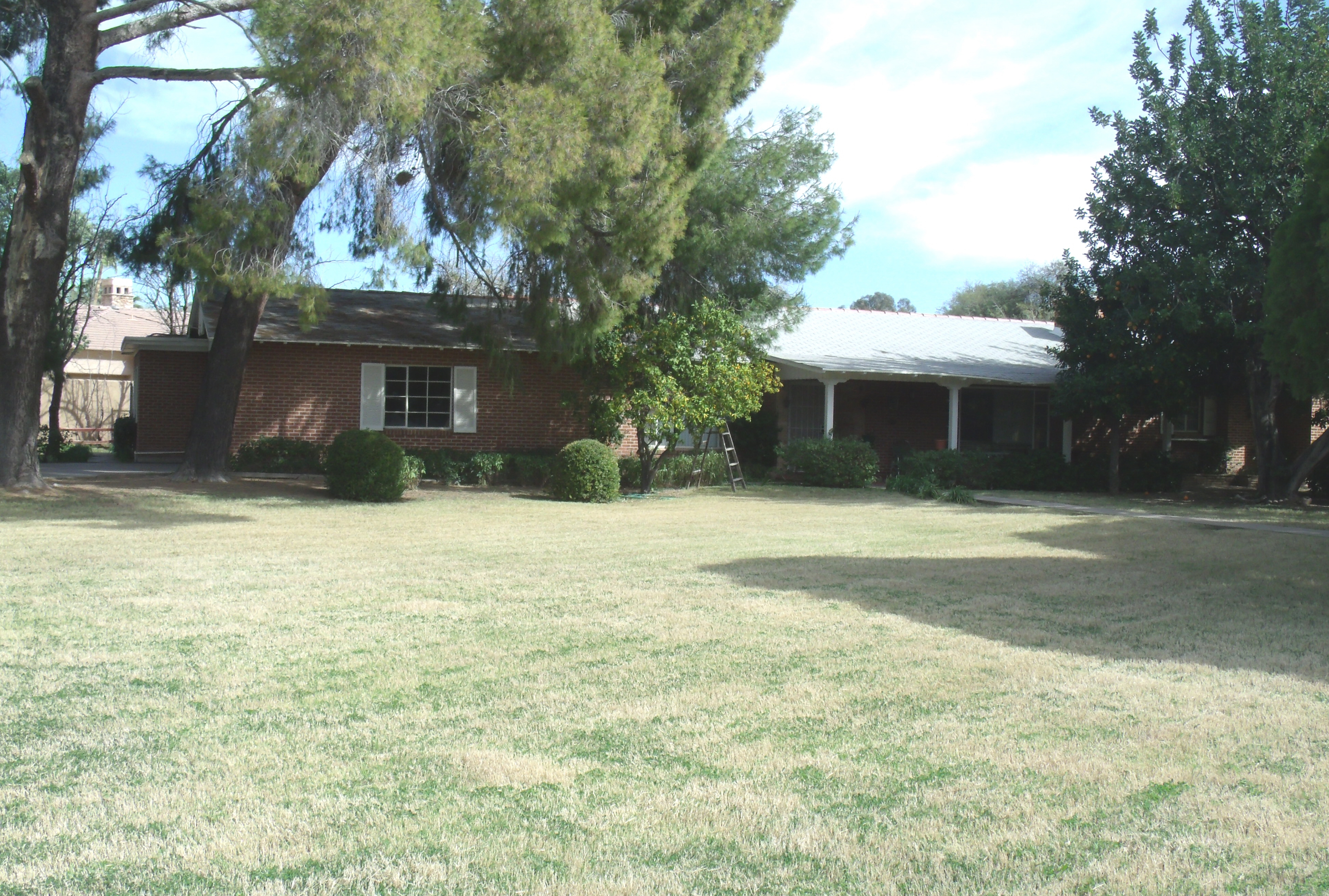
The Dea Hong Toy House was built in 1954 and is located at 2222 East Pasadena Avenue. This property is recognized as historic by the Asian American Historic Property Survey.

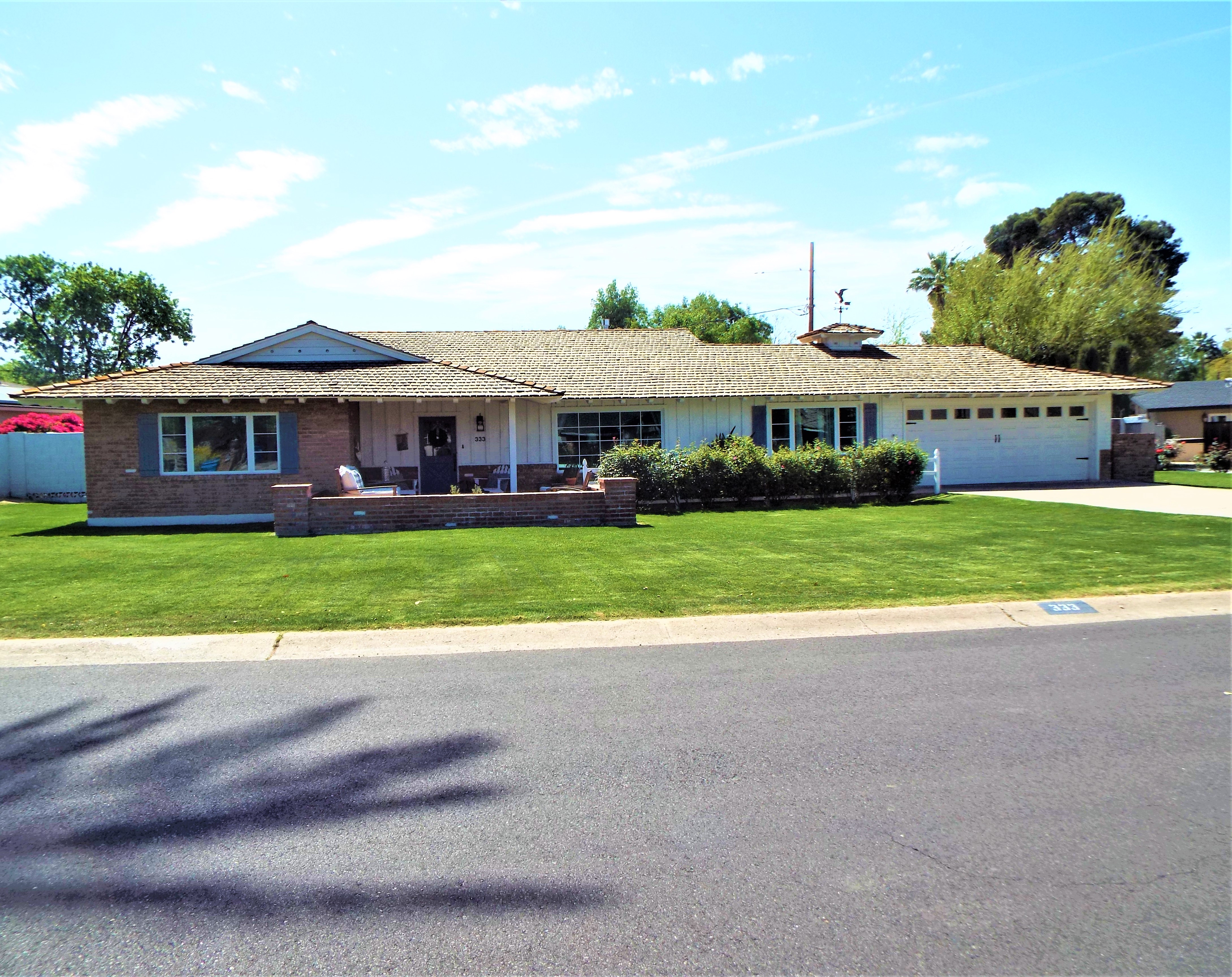
The Ozell M. Trask House was built in 1956 and is located at 333 W. Gardenia Dr. It was listed in the Phoenix Historic Property Register in October 2020.

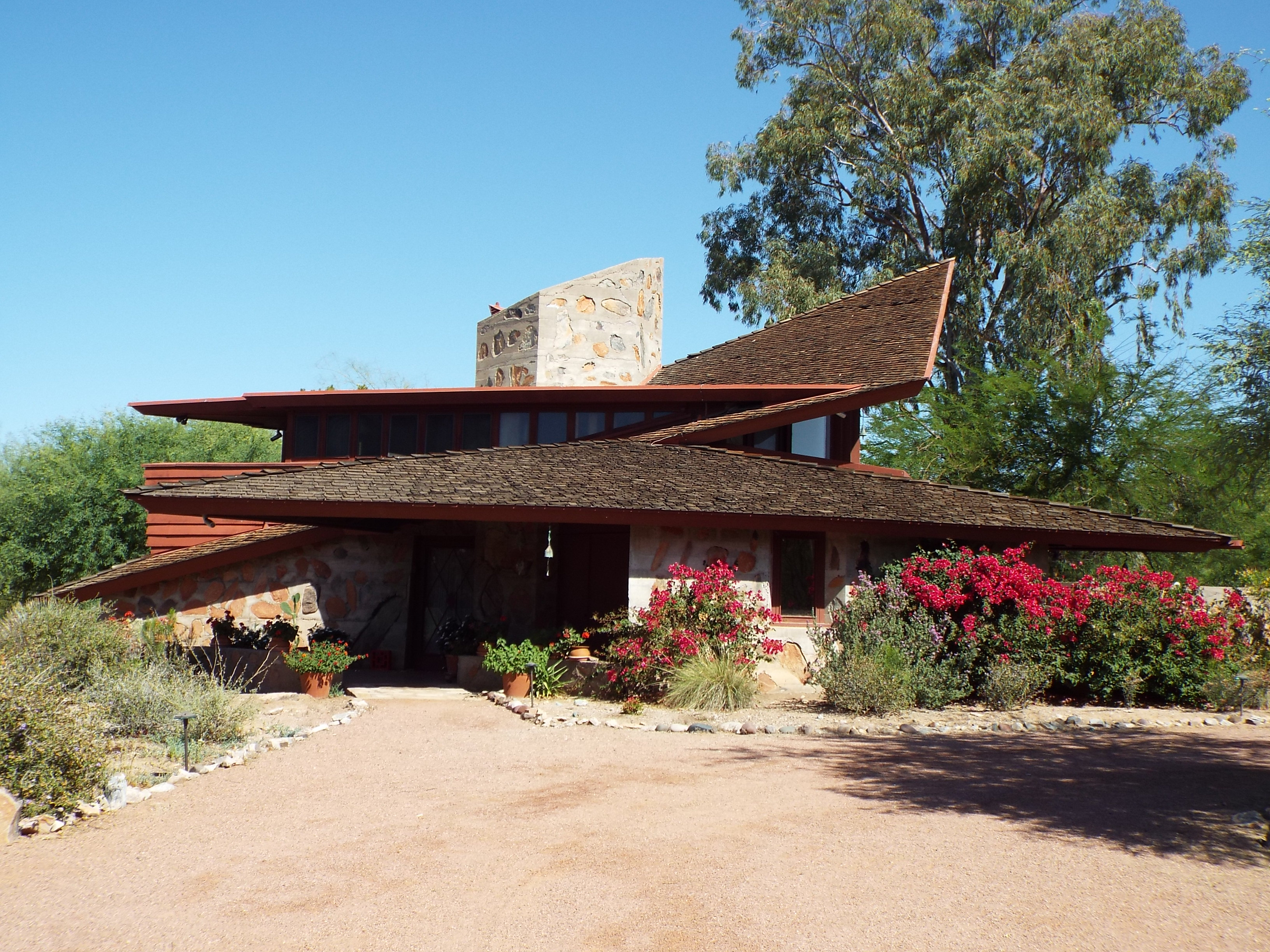
The Jorgine Boomer House was built in 1956 and is located at 5808 30th Street in Phoenix. The house was designed by Frank Lloyd Wright for Jorgine Slettede Boomer, the widow of Lucius Boomer, a successful hotelier. The house was listed in the National Register of Historic Places on March 15, 2016, reference #16000071.

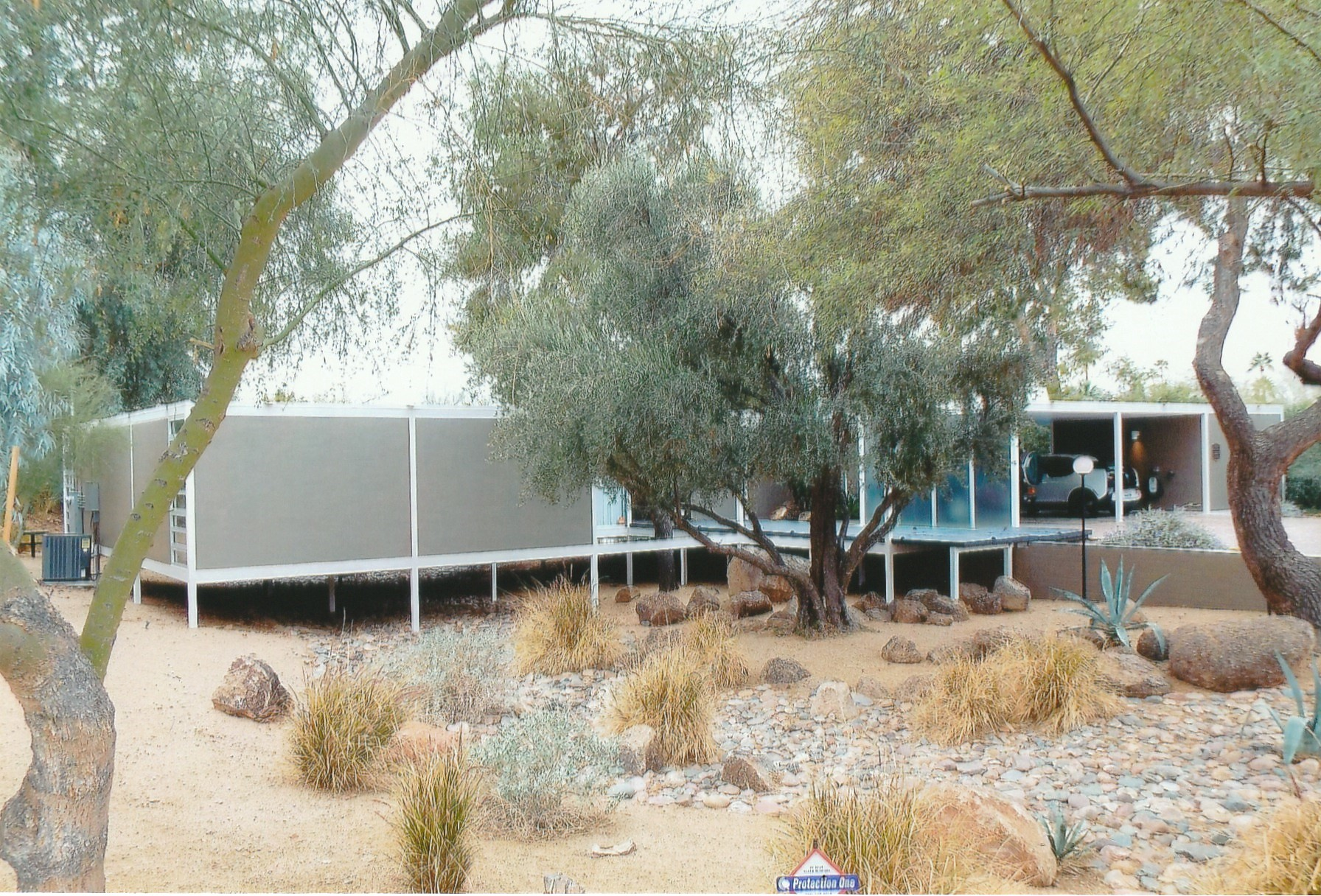
The Beadley House #11 was built in 1963 and is located at 4323 East McDonald Drive. It was listed in the National Register of Historic Places on November 13, 2017 reference #100001786.

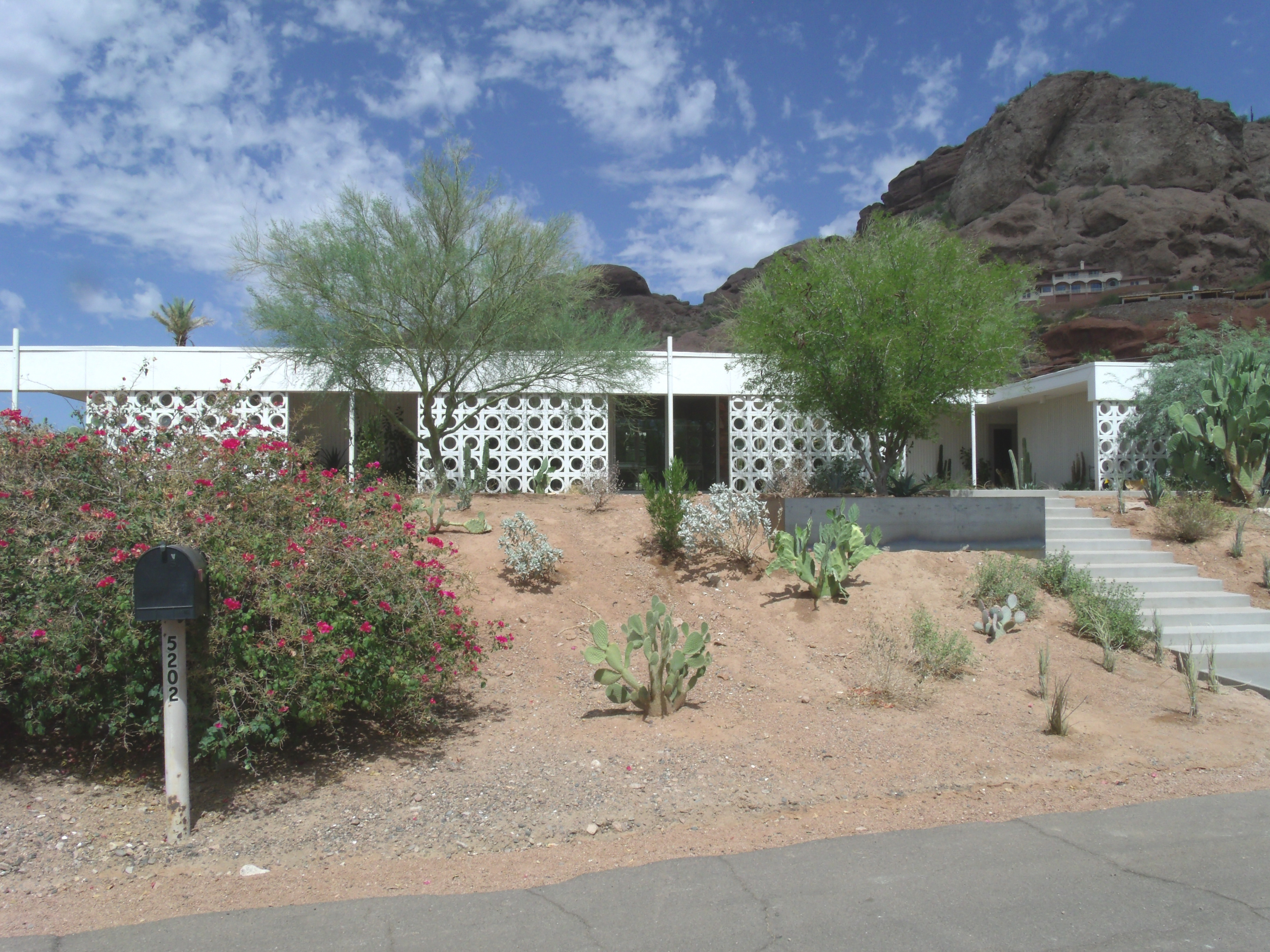
The White Gates Residence was built in 1964 and is located in 5202 Saddle Road in the corner of White Gates Drive in the southern end of Camelback Mountain. In 2009 it was listed in the Arizona Preservation Foundation Historic Properties Endangered list. The property is listed as Historic by the Phoenix Historic Property Register.

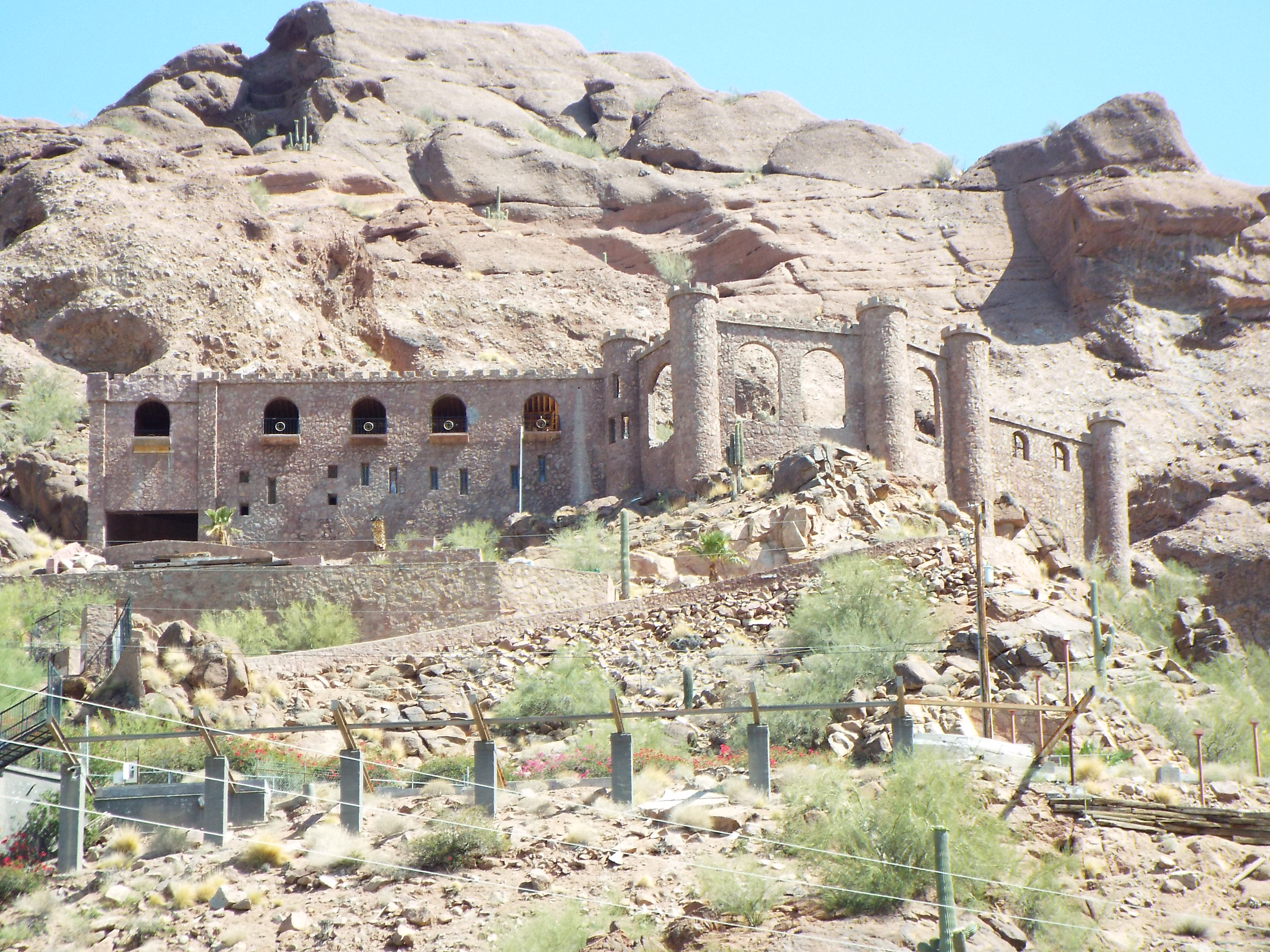
The construction of the Camelback Castle/Copenhaver Castle began in 1967 was finished in 1977. The castle is located at 5050 E. Red Rock Dr. The architectural style of the castle is that of medieval Moorish. The castle has a dungeon, a drawbridge and a moat as well.

=== Historic African, Asian and Hispanic properties ===
External videos
- You can watch and listen to a video (documentary) about the Hispanic American Historic Property Survey in Phoenix here

The City of Phoenix conducted various historic property surveys focusing on the themes of African, Asian and Hispanic history in Phoenix from 1870 to 1975. The purpose of the surveys was to identify the number and locations of minority associated historic properties citywide and to document their significance to their community. The surveys were funded by the Phoenix Historic Preservation Bonds funds as well as a Certified Local Government grant received from the National Park Service through the Arizona State Historic Preservation Office. While the National Register of Historic Places Criteria is only concentrated on the properties of these communities prior to 1955, the study included in the surveys take into consideration the significance of the struggle for civil rights and equality. Therefore, the properties which were involved in ending segregation in Phoenix are also included.

The areas covered in the African American Historic Property Survey are 1. East – the region south of Van Buren Avenue to the Southern Pacific Railroad tracks, east of Central Avenue to 24th Street; 2. West – the region south of Grant Avenue to the Salt River, west of 7th Avenue to 19th Avenue; and 3. South – the region south of the Salt River to Southern Avenue, east of 16th Street to 28th Street.

The areas covered in the Asian American Historic Property Survey are spread throughout Phoenix and not concentrated in one area. The concentration of the areas depends on the nationality from which they are descended, such as Chinese, Japanese, Filipino and Asian Indian.

The areas covered in the Hispanic American Historic Property Survey are the regions south of the Southern Pacific Railroad tracks to the Salt River, east of Central Avenue to 24th Street; west of Central Avenue to 27th Avenue and south of the Salt River to Baseline, east to 48th Street and west to 35th Avenue. One of the structures considered as iconic is the Sacred Heart Church which is located in 920 S. 17th St. The church was built in 1900 in what was once a Hispanic neighborhood called "Golden Gate". The City of Phoenix forced the residents of the community in question to move and demolished the entire neighborhood. The reason given for this act was that the city needed the land to expand Sky Harbor Airport. The church was added to National Register of Historic Places on March 20, 2012. Reference number 12000124.

The following prominent people who at one time or another lived in Phoenix and whose houses are listed here are:

African Americans
- Judge Hazel Burton Daniels – Daniels was the first African American elected to the Arizona legislature and was the first African-American municipal judge in Phoenix, serving as such from 1965 to 1971.
- Dr. Lincoln Johnson Ragsdale Sr. and Eleanor D. Ragsdale – The Ragsdales were influential leader in the Phoenix Civil Rights Movement. They played an instrumental role in the reforms made of voting rights and the desegregation of schools, neighborhoods and public housing.
- Charles Smith – Smith was the only African-American blacksmith in Phoenix in the early 1920s.
- John Ford Smith – Smith is the only Arizonan known to have played in the national Negro Baseball Leagues. In 1941 Smith joined the Kansas City Monarchs, a team that won its third straight pennant in the Negro American League that year. Smith worked for Phoenix Union High School, served as director of Eastlake Park, and eventually became assistant vice president of human resources at the Arizona Bank. He was active in civil rights issues and served as director of the Arizona Civil Rights Commission.
- Travis L. Williams – Williams was one of the founders of Williams and Jones Construction Company which built homes primarily in South Phoenix. From 1964 to 1989 he worked for the City of Phoenix where he retired as the head of the Human Resources Department. He was a member of several service and civic organizations including the NAACP and Southminster Presbyterian Church.
Historic African-American Properties
(including buildings, schools, churches and homes)
National Register of Historic Places=(NRHP)
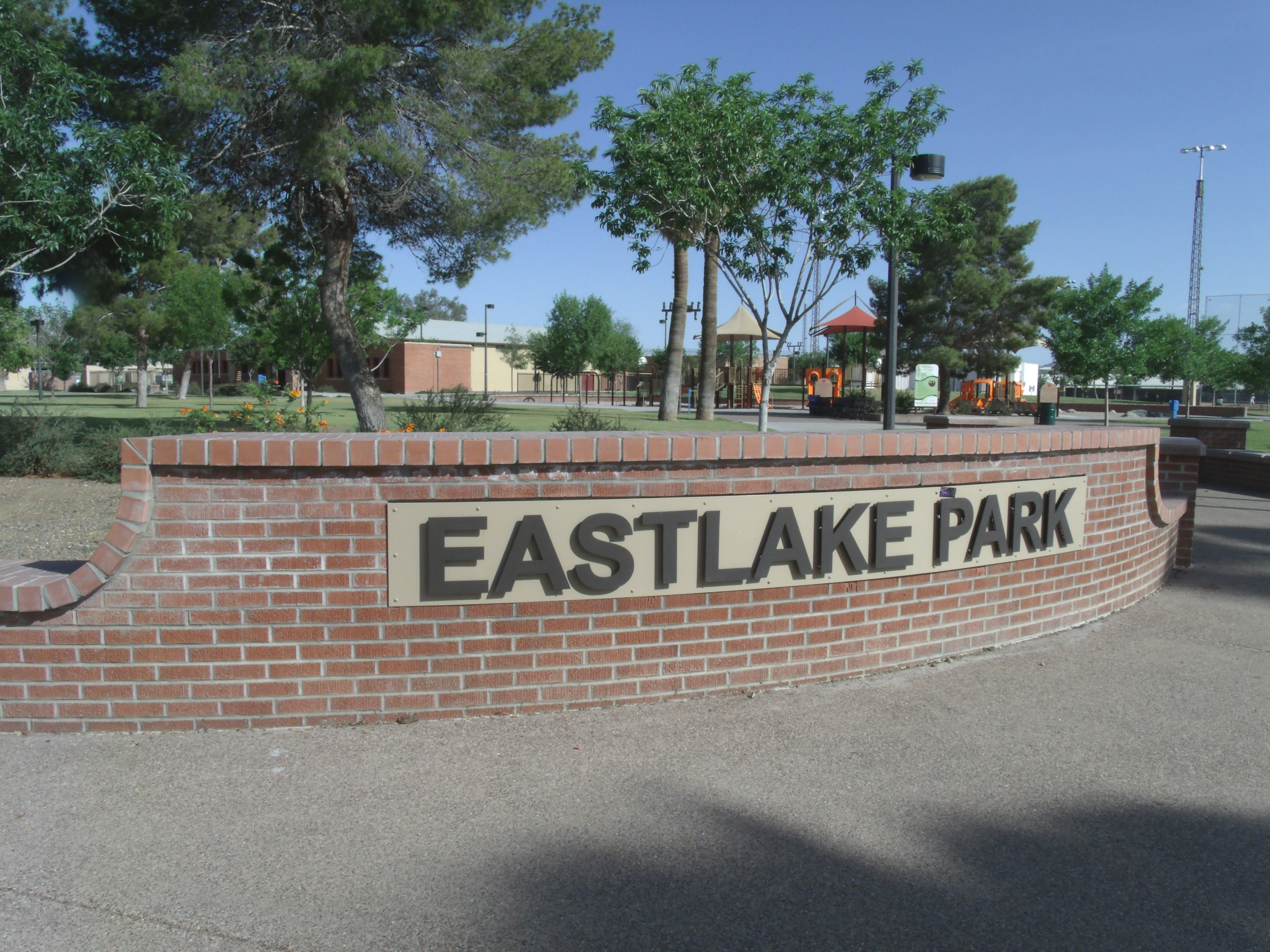
Eastlake Park is bounded by 15th, 16th, Jefferson and Jackson streets. The period of historic significance of this park was from 1890 to 1949. In 1911, Booker T. Washington spoke there during the celebration called the Great Emancipation Jubilee. W. E. B. DuBois also addressed a crowd in the park. The park was listed in the Phoenix Historic Property Register in June 2009.

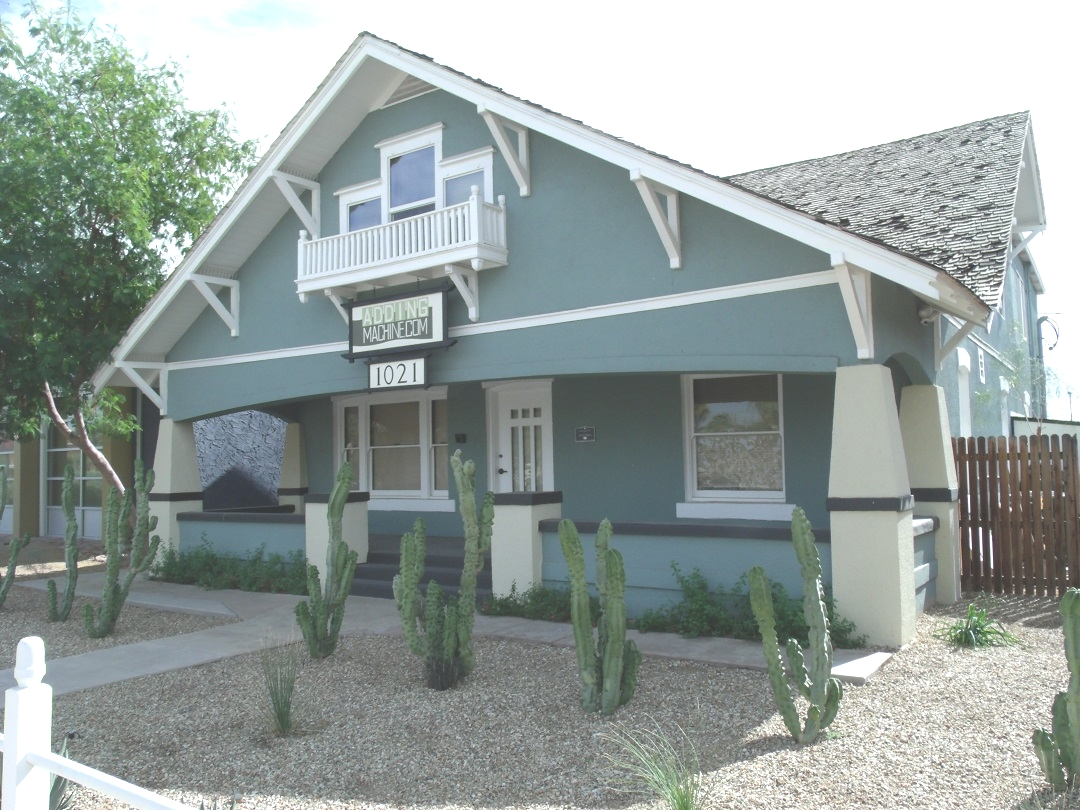
The Swindall Tourist Inn was built in 1913 and is located at 1021 E. Washington Street. Prior to 1964, public accommodations in Phoenix and Arizona were segregated: African Americans were not allowed to stay in the hotels in downtown Phoenix. The structure, which is listed in the National register of Historic Places ref. number 95001081, is the only known surviving African-American boarding house in Phoenix. It is also listed on the African American Historic Property Survey.

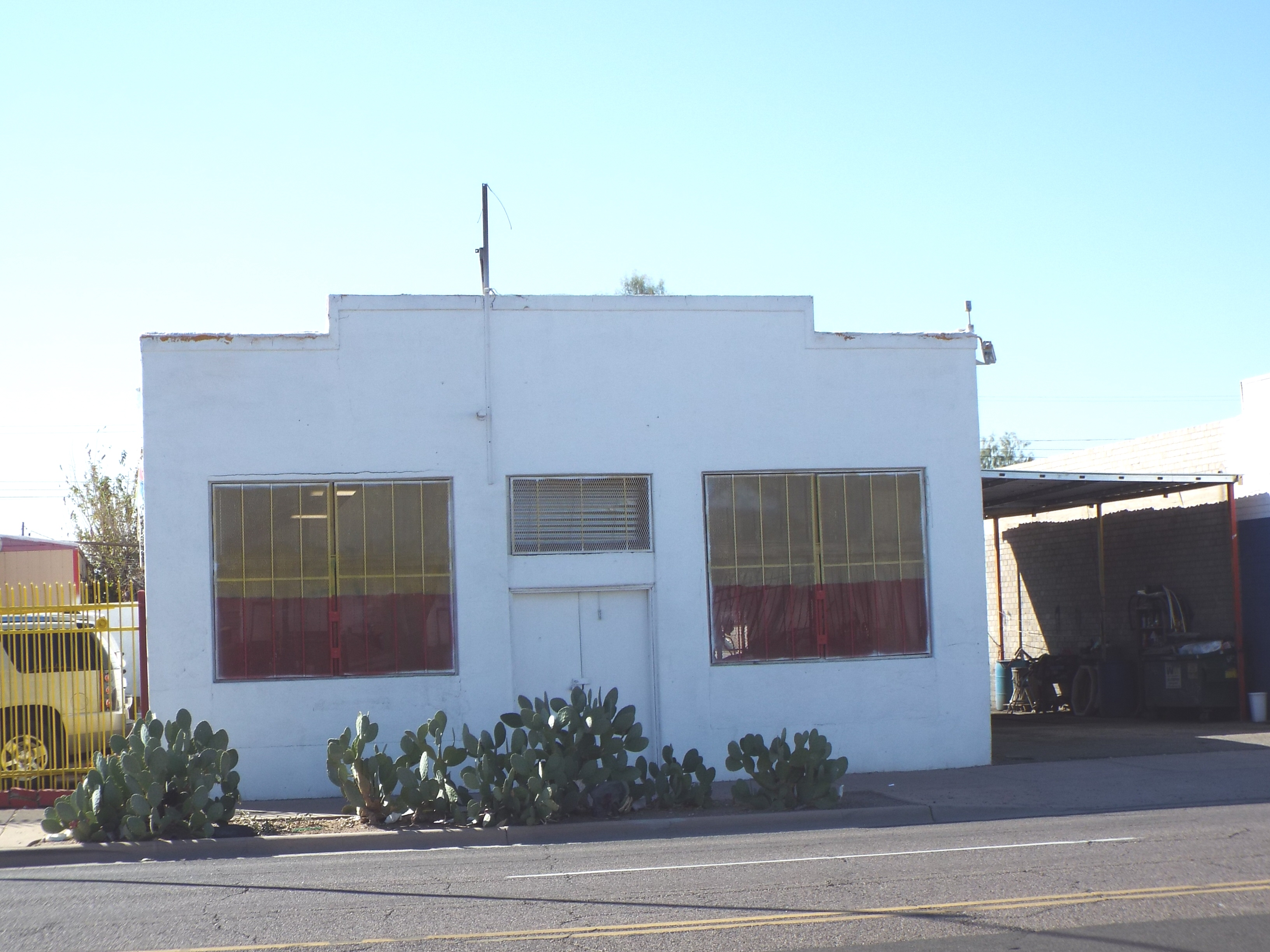
The Charles Smith Blacksmith Shop was built in the early 1920s and located at 1441 E. Van Buren St.

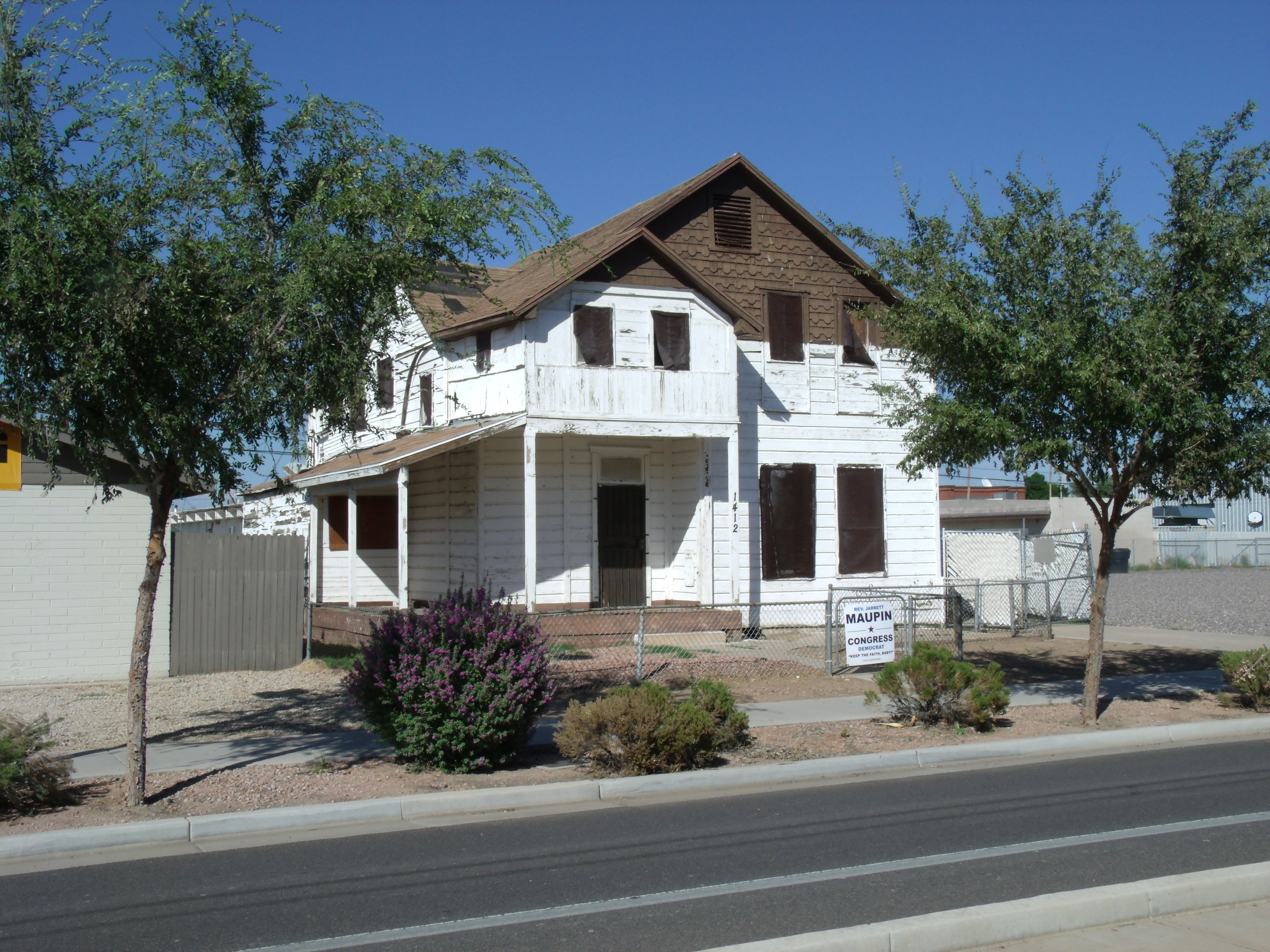
African-American home built in 1920 and located at 1412 E. Jefferson Street. It is listed on the African American Historic Property Survey.

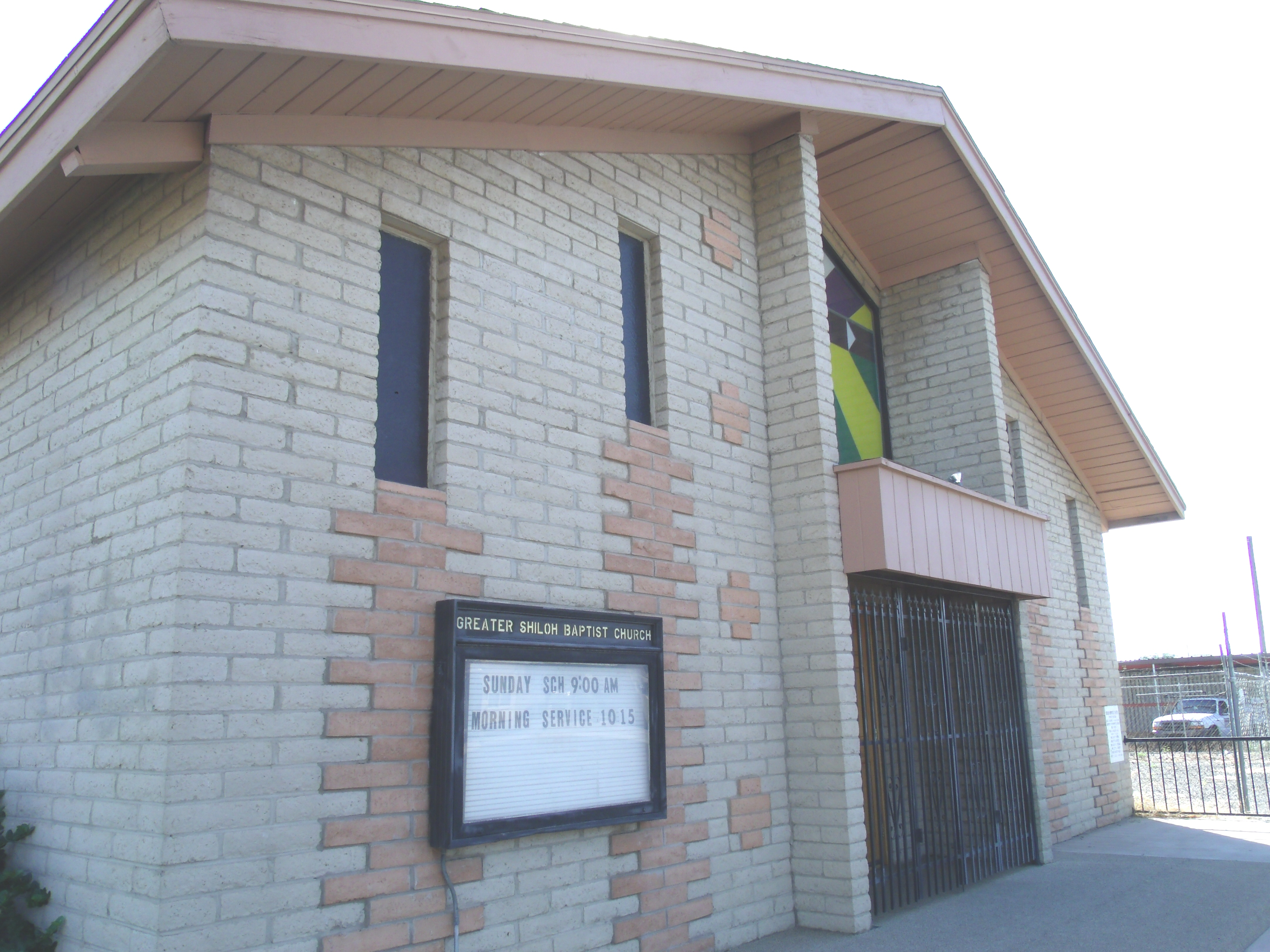
The Shiloh Baptist Church built in 1924 and located at 901 W. Buckeye Road. This is one of the earliest African-American churches in the West side of Phoenix. It is listed on the African American Historic Property Survey.

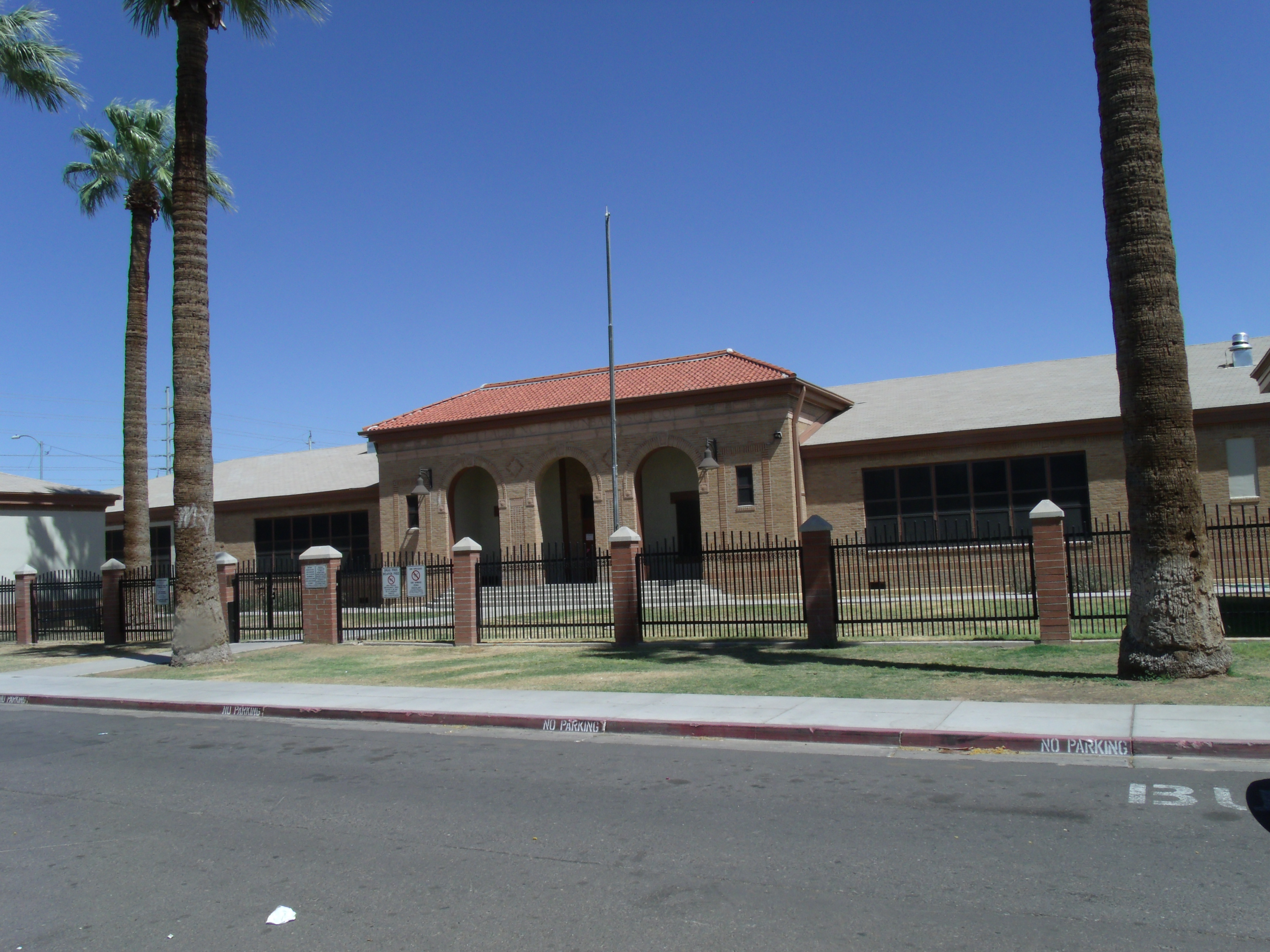
The Dunbar School was built in 1925 and is located at 707 W. Grant St. It was listed in the National Register of Historic Places on August 12, 1993, ref. #93000740.

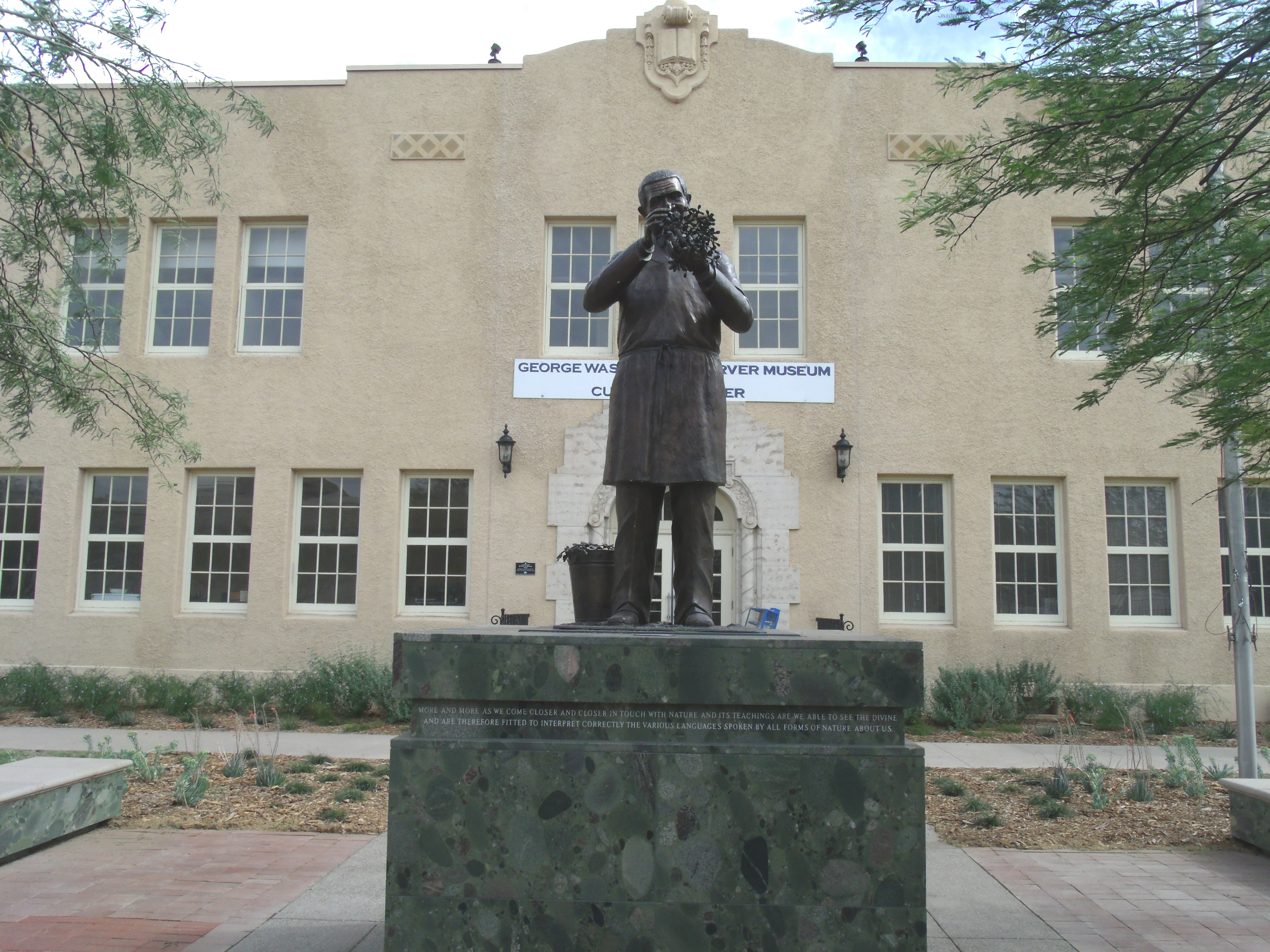
The Phoenix Union Colored High School (Later renamed George Washington Carver High School) was built in 1926 and is located at 415 E. Grant St. It was listed in the National Register of Historic Places on May 2, 1991, ref. #91000543.

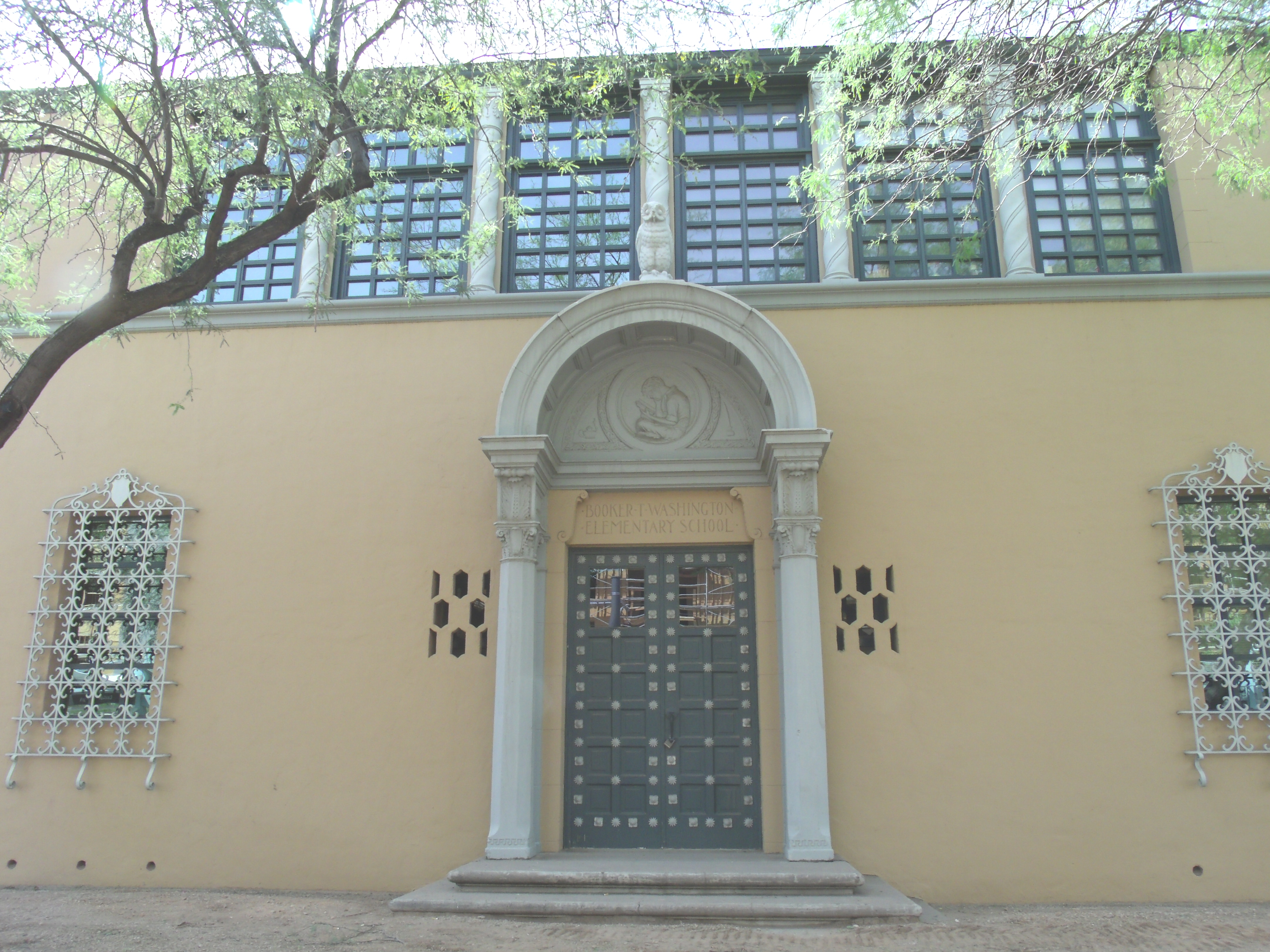
The Booker T. Washington School was built in 1928 and is located at 1201 E. Jefferson St. The school was the first all Black elementary school in Phoenix. It now houses the "Sun Times" of Phoenix. It is listed in the Phoenix Historic Property Register.

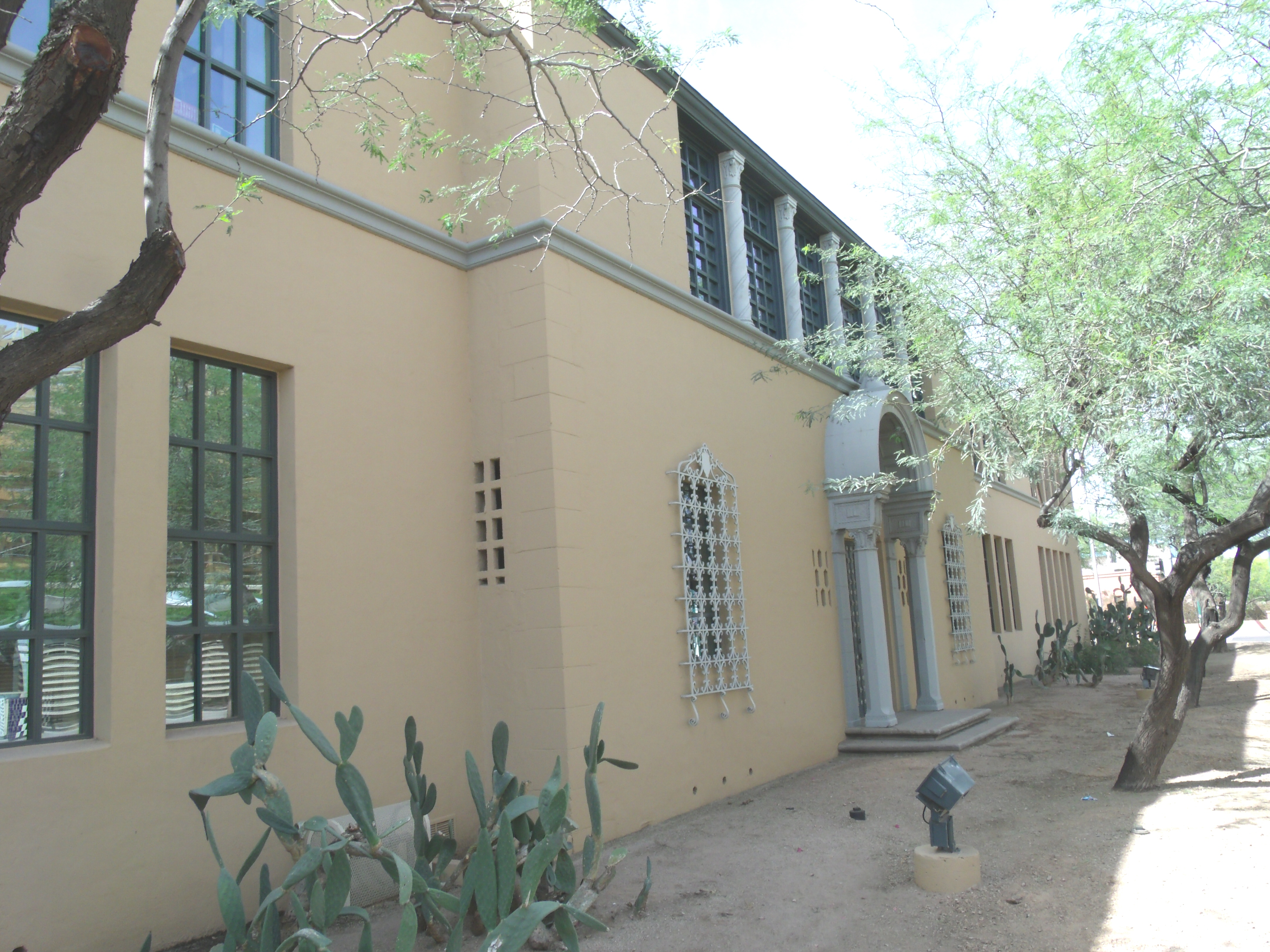
Different view of the Booker T. Washington School

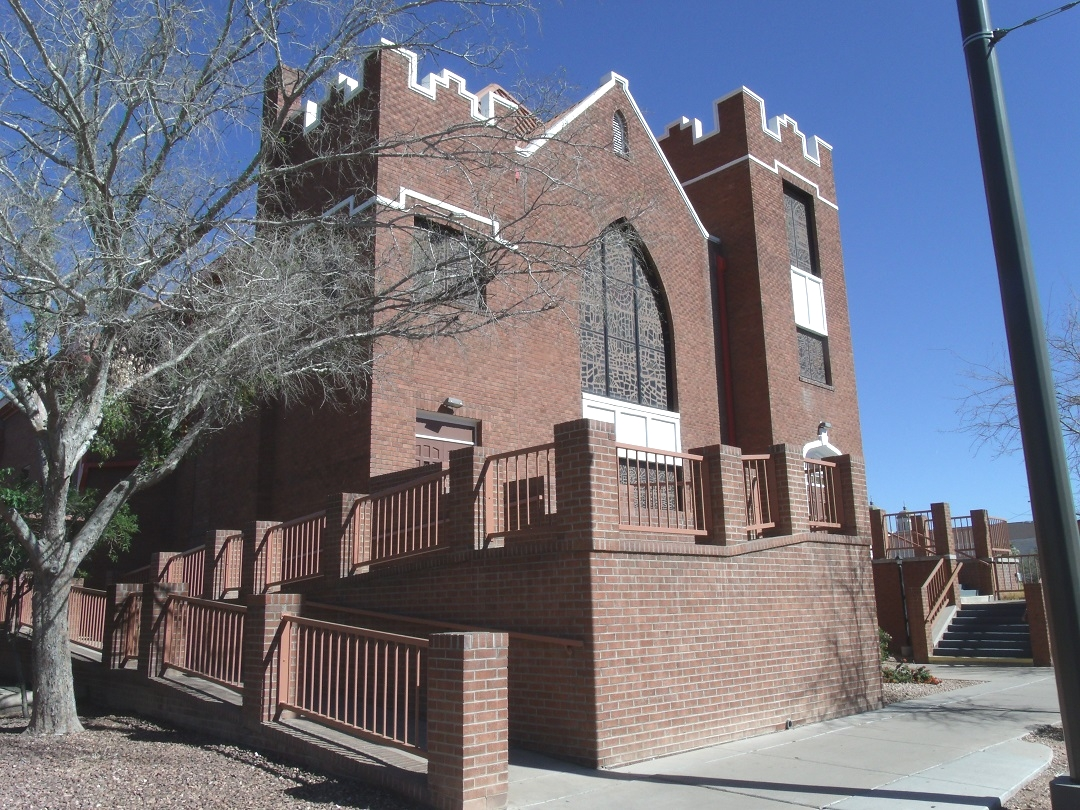
The Tanner Chapel A.M.E. Church, named after Bishop Benjamin T. Tanner, is located at 20 S. 8th Avenue. Built in 1929, it is the oldest African-American congregation in Arizona. Designated as a landmark with Historic Preservation-Landmark (HP-L) overlay zoning. It is listed in the Phoenix Historic Property Register (PHPR).

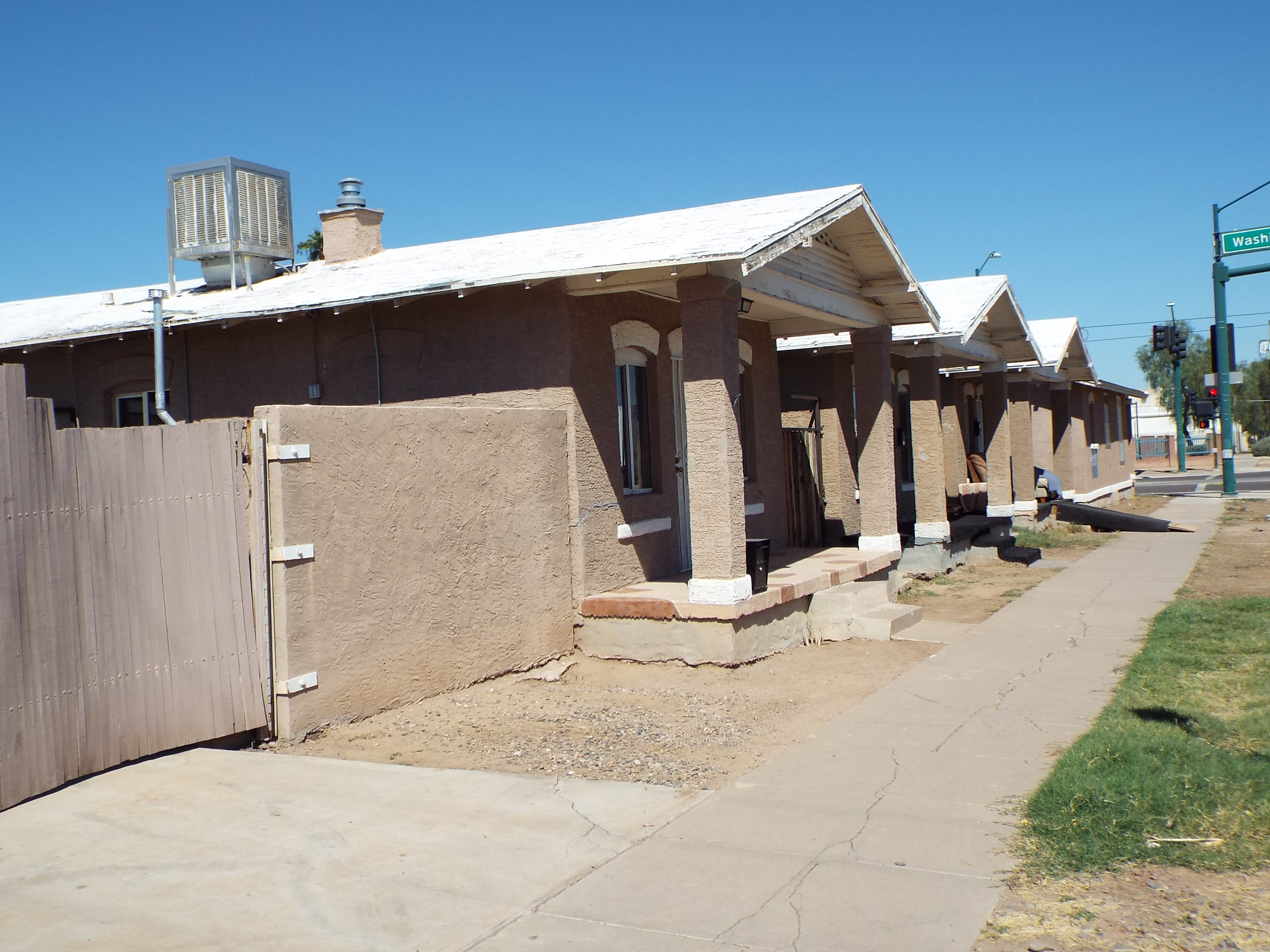
Three of the six cottages that Dr. Winston C. Hackett had built in the 1930s for his patients who were suffering from tuberculosis. They are located on 14th Avenue between East Jefferson and Washington Streets.

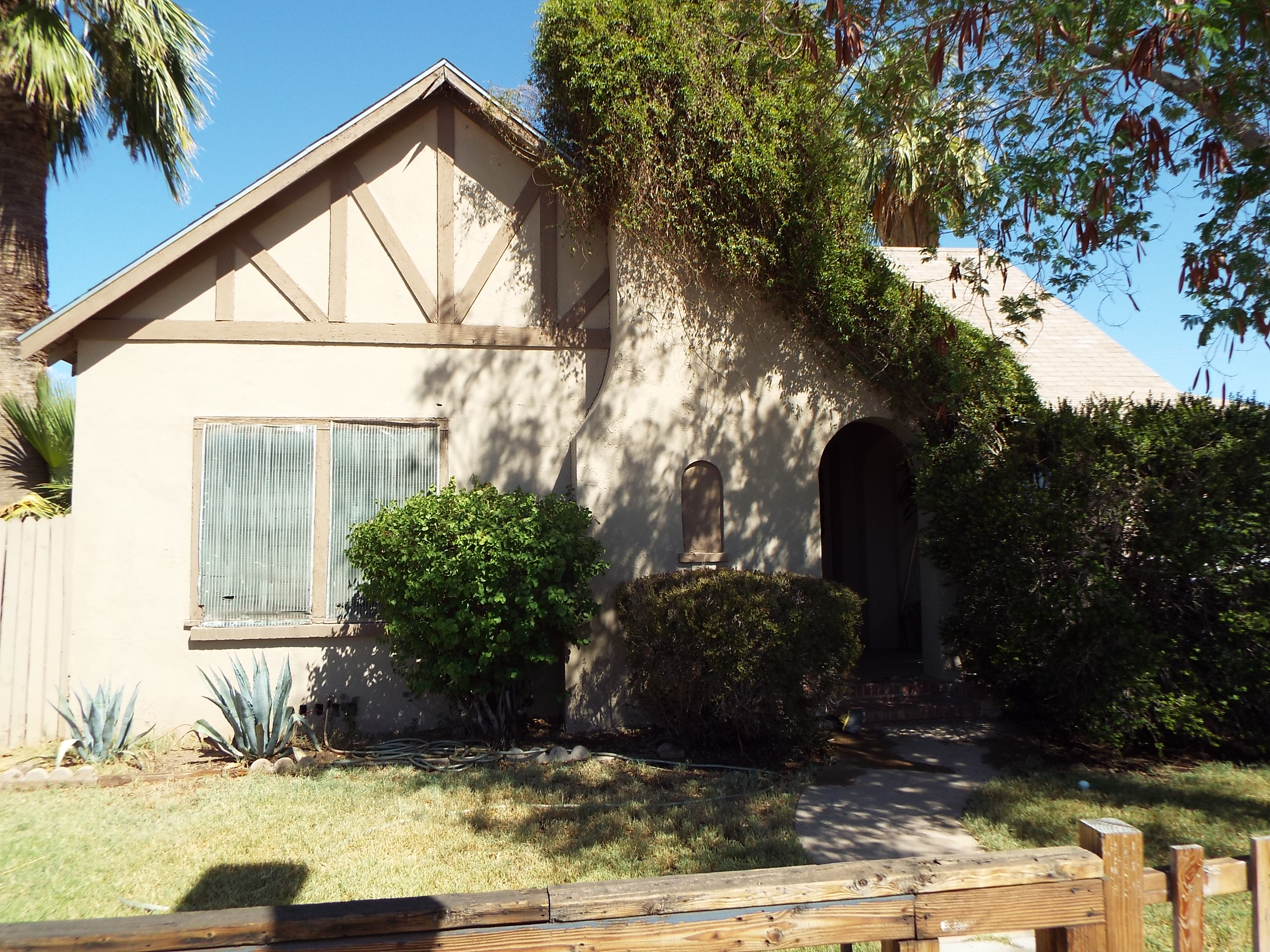
The W.A. Robinson House was built in 1935 and is located at 1314 East Jefferson Street. Robinson was the principal of Washington Carver High School, an African-American school. He was concerned about the effects which the desegregation of the schools may have on the African-American students. It is recognized as historical by the City of Phoenix African-American Survey.

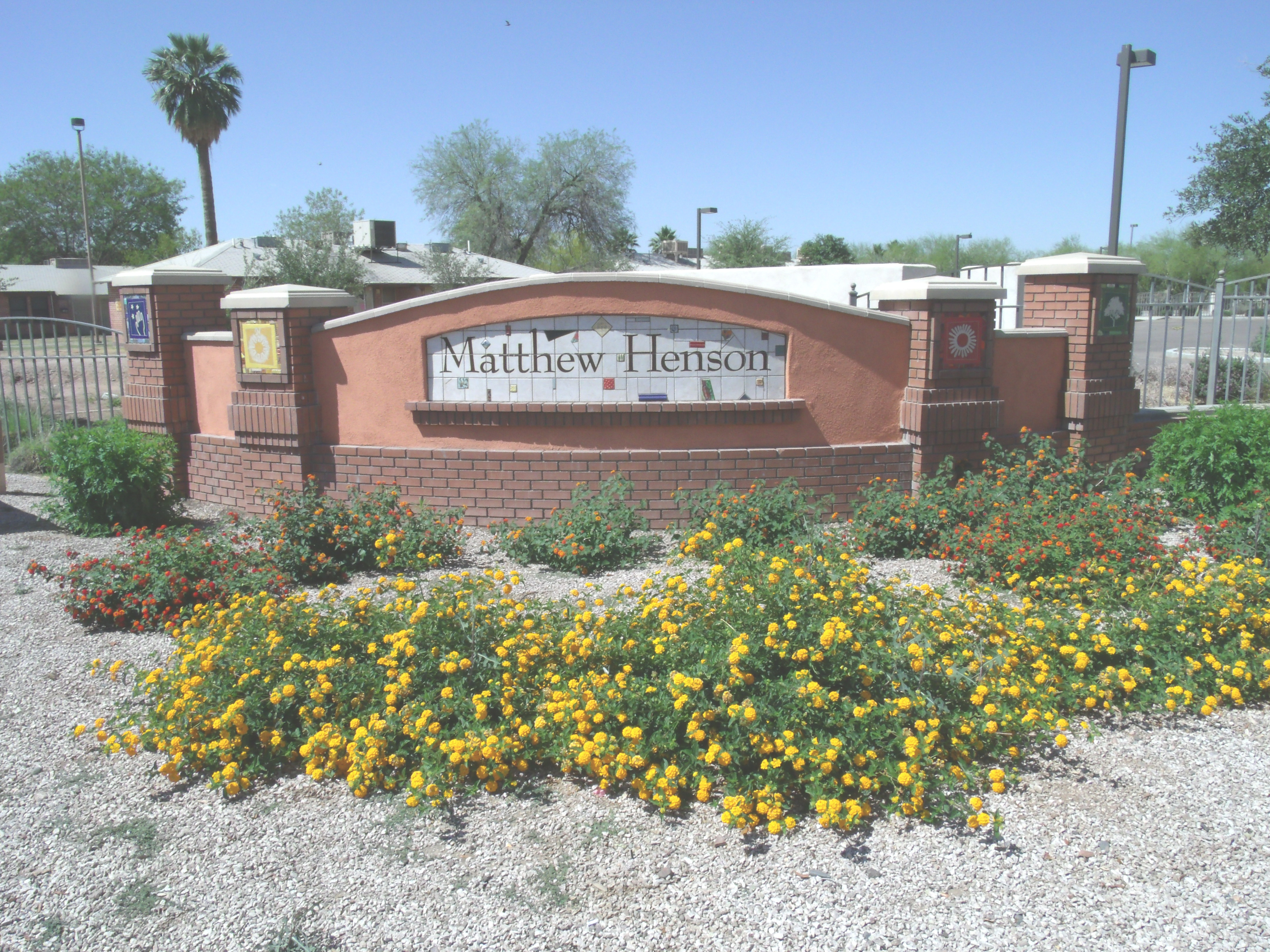
Entrance of where the historic Matthew Henson Public Housing Project once stood. The Matthew Henson Public Housing Project was built in 1940 and provided affordable housing for the African-American community. The Matthew Henson Public Housing Project District is located on the west side of Seventh Avenue just south of the Sherman Street alignment. It was named as a historic district by the Phoenix Historic Property Register in June 2005.

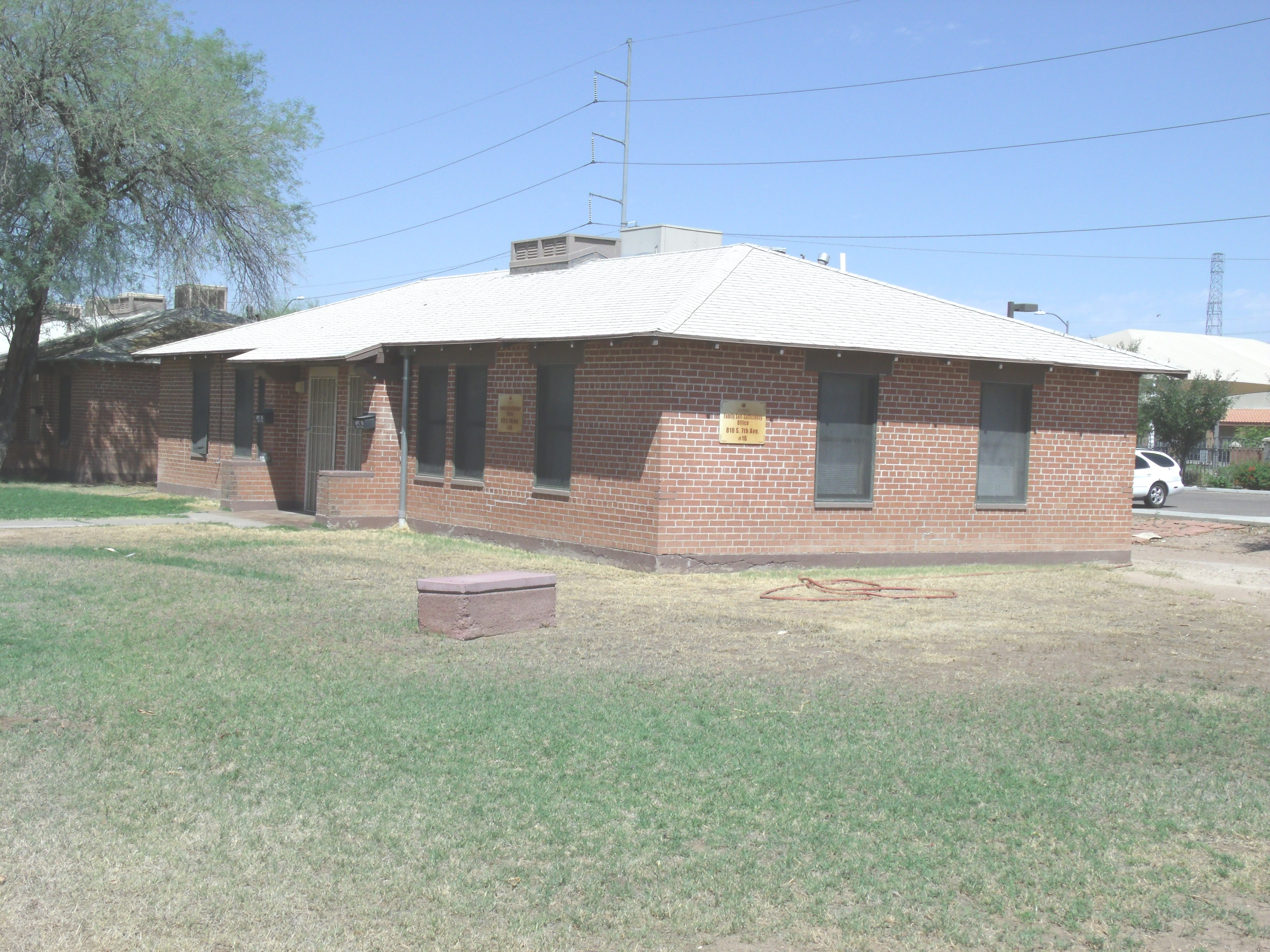
One of the original houses in the courtyard of the Matthew Henson Public Housing Project. The house was built in 1940 and in a courtyard which has been preserved from demolition. The housing project was built in 1940 and provided affordable housing for the African-American community. The Matthew Henson Public Housing Project district is located on the west side of Seventh Avenue just south of the Sherman Street alignment. It was named as a historic district by the Phoenix Historic Property Register in June 2005.

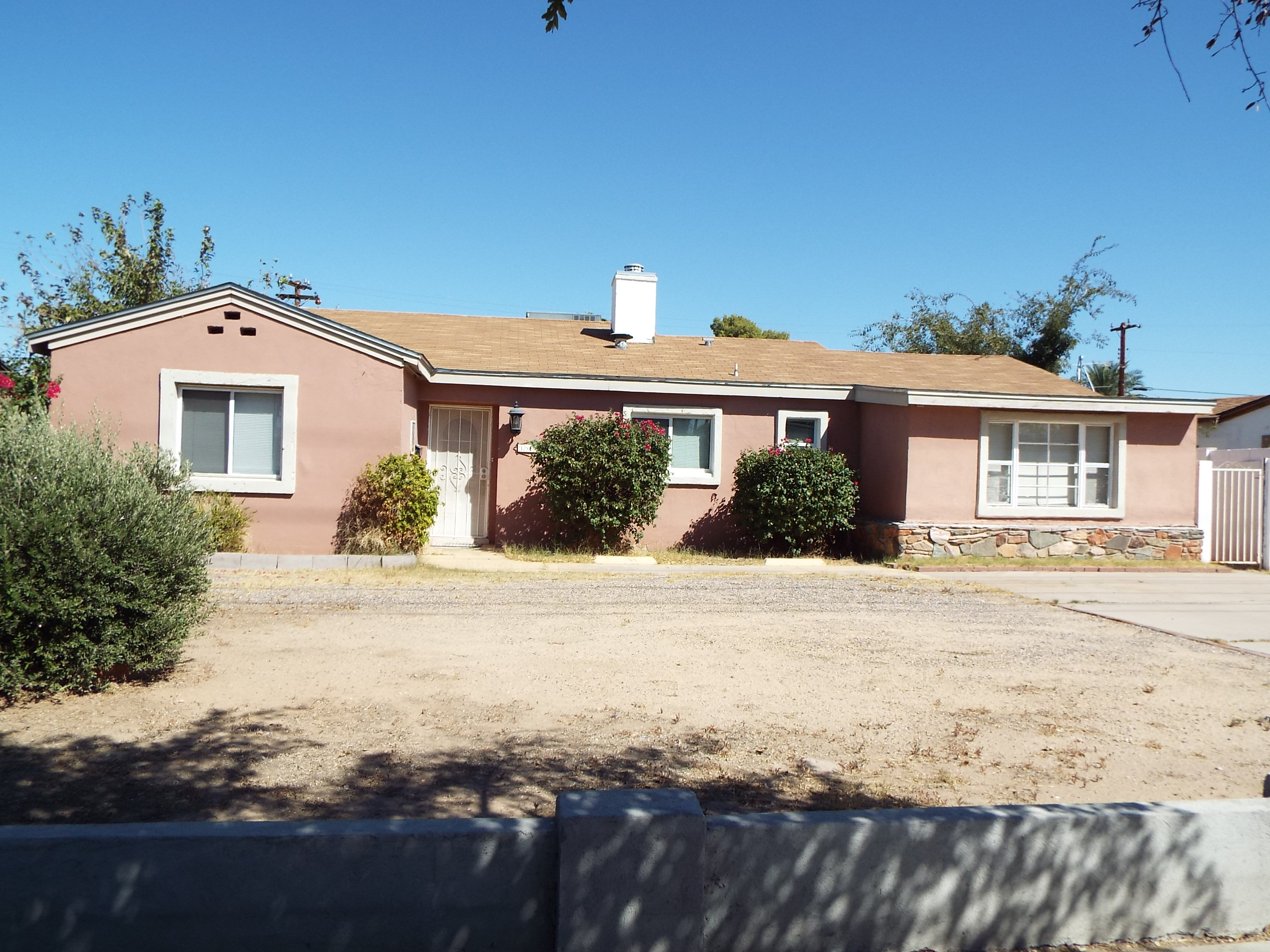
The Dr. Lincoln Johnson Ragsdale, Sr. House was built in 1941 and located at 1606 West Thomas Road.

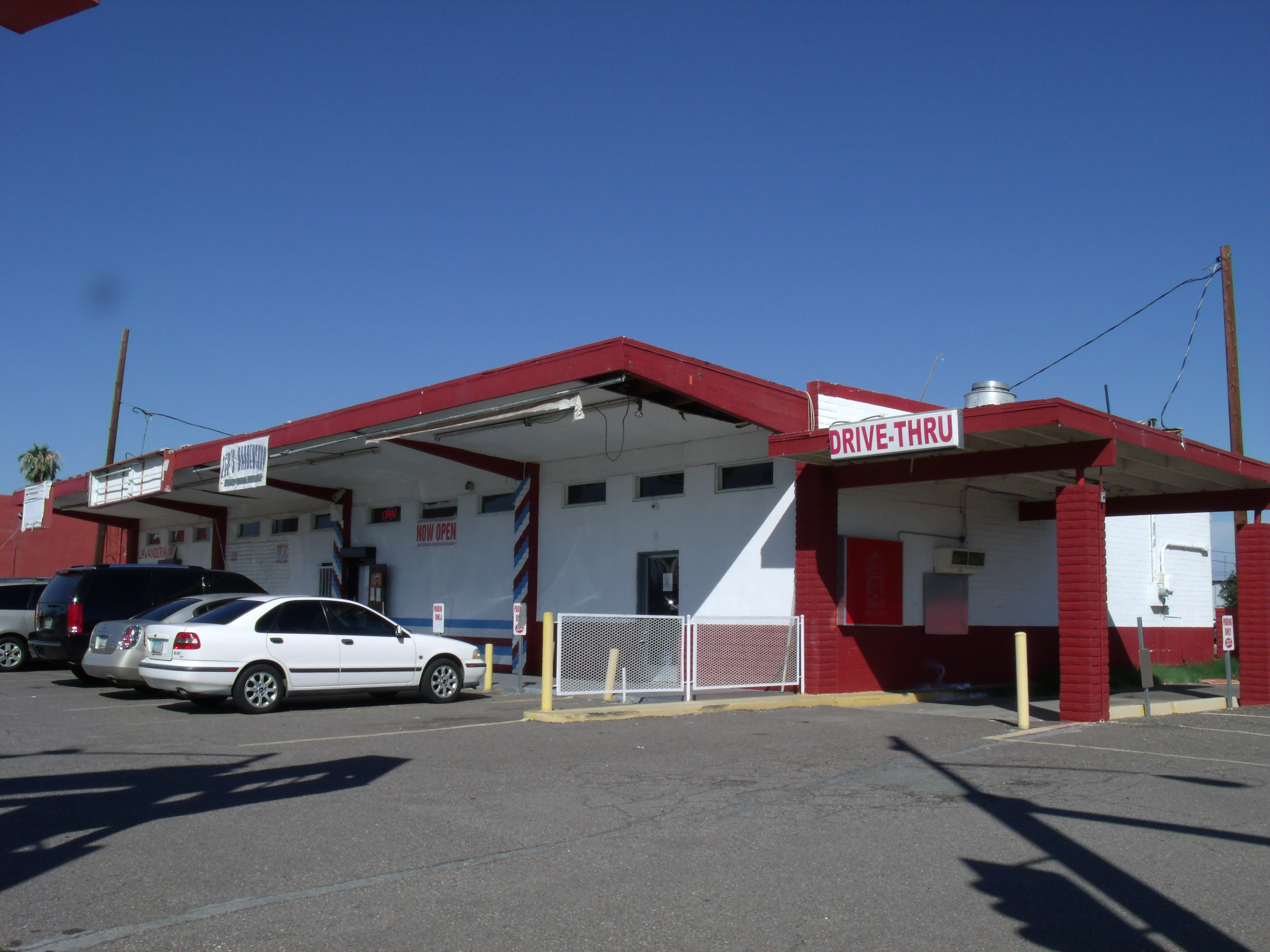
This is the building where in 1944, Gordon Fritch established his Gordon Fritch Cafe. The cafe, which was a popular place among Phoenix's African Americans, is located at 1602 East Jefferson Street. Later, Reddey's Corner was established. "Reddey's Corner" was the oldest Drive-in Liquor Store in Phoenix. It is listed on the African American Historic Property Survey.

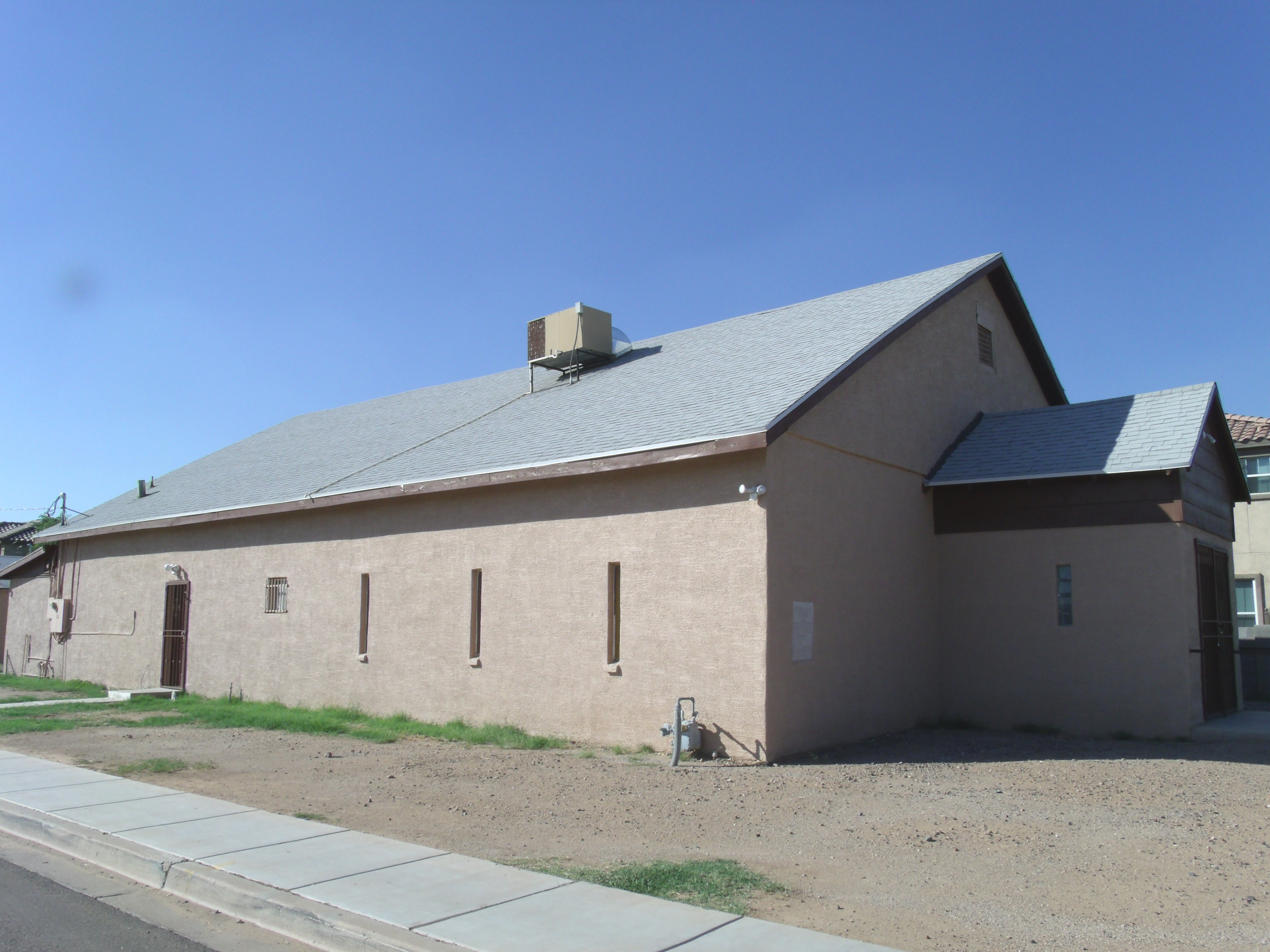
The Mount Calvary Baptist Church was built in 1944 and is located at 998 South 13th Avenue in Phoenix. It is one of the earliest churches to serve the Phoenix Afro-American community. It is listed on the African American Historic Property Survey.

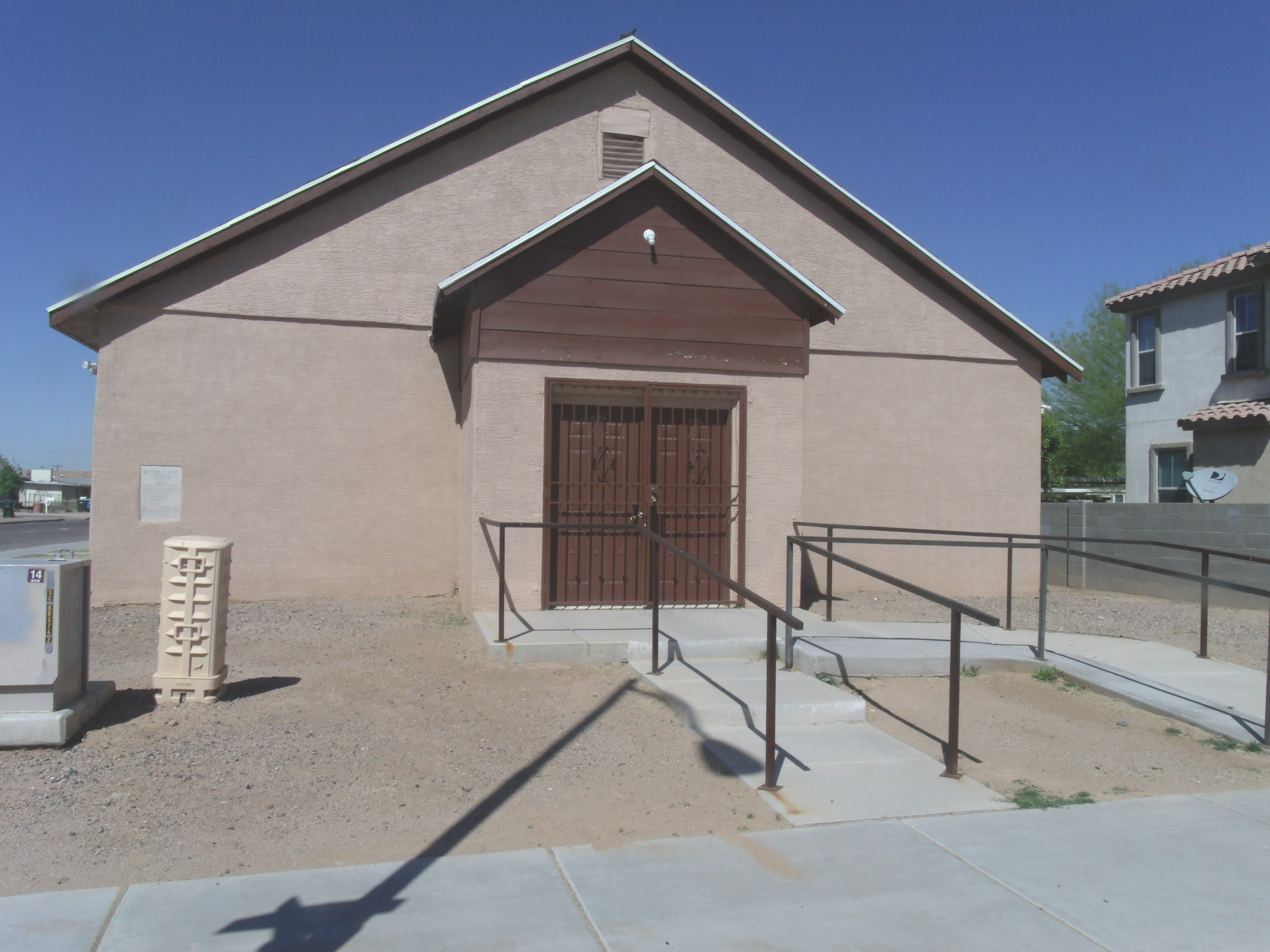
The Bethel CME Church (Bethel Mission) was built in 1944 and is located in 998 S. 13th Avenue. It is listed as historic by the Phoenix African-American Survey.

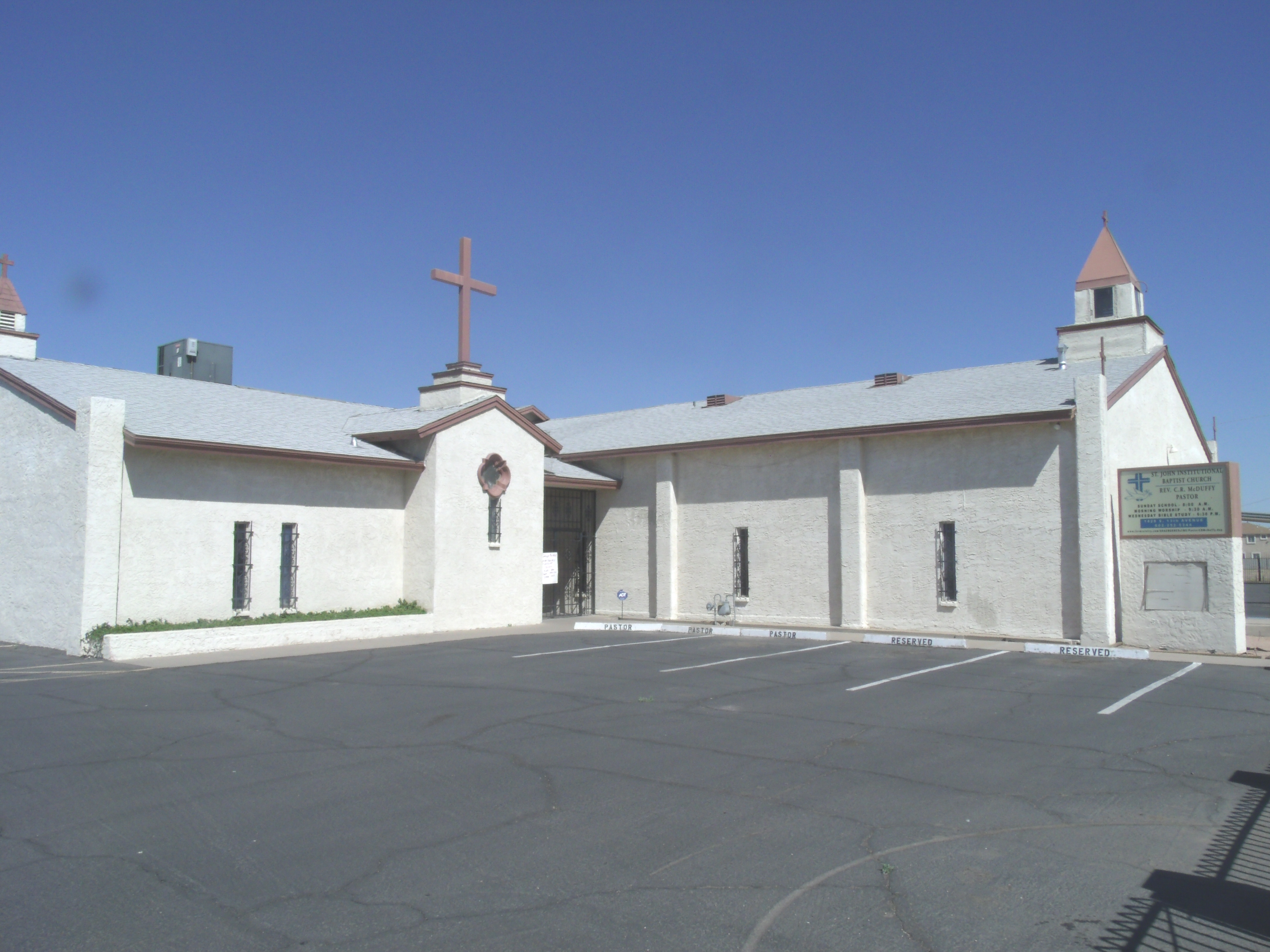
The St. John's Institutional Baptist Church was built in 1944 and is located in 1428 S. 13th Avenue. The Rev. L.J. Dunbar led St. John's Institutional Baptist Church, starting in 1941. Dunbar helped organized approximately 35 other Baptist churches in the state. He died in 1994 at the age of 91. It is listed as historic by the Phoenix African-American Survey.

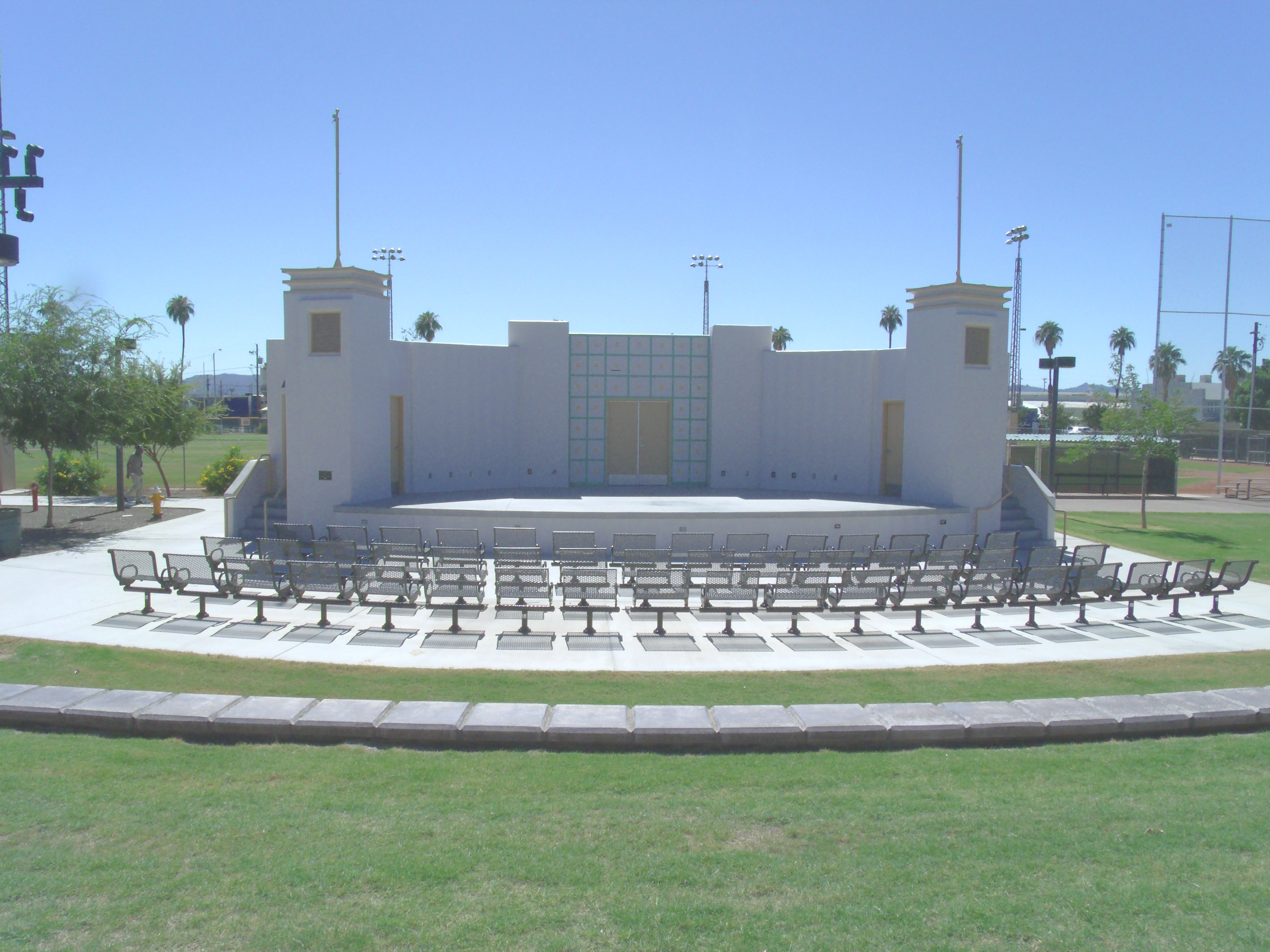
The Geogie M. & Calvin C. Goode Bandshell was built in 1945 and is located in Eastlake Park at 1549 E. Jefferson St. In 1948 African American activist Claudia Jones spoke from the bandshell to a crowd of 1,000 people at Eastlake Park about equal rights for African Americans. The bandshell is named after African-American Geogie M. Goode, an author, educator and activist. She was married to Calvin C. Goode, who served a total of 22 years as a representative to the Phoenix, Arizona City Council. The bandshell is listed in the Phoenix Historic Property Register.

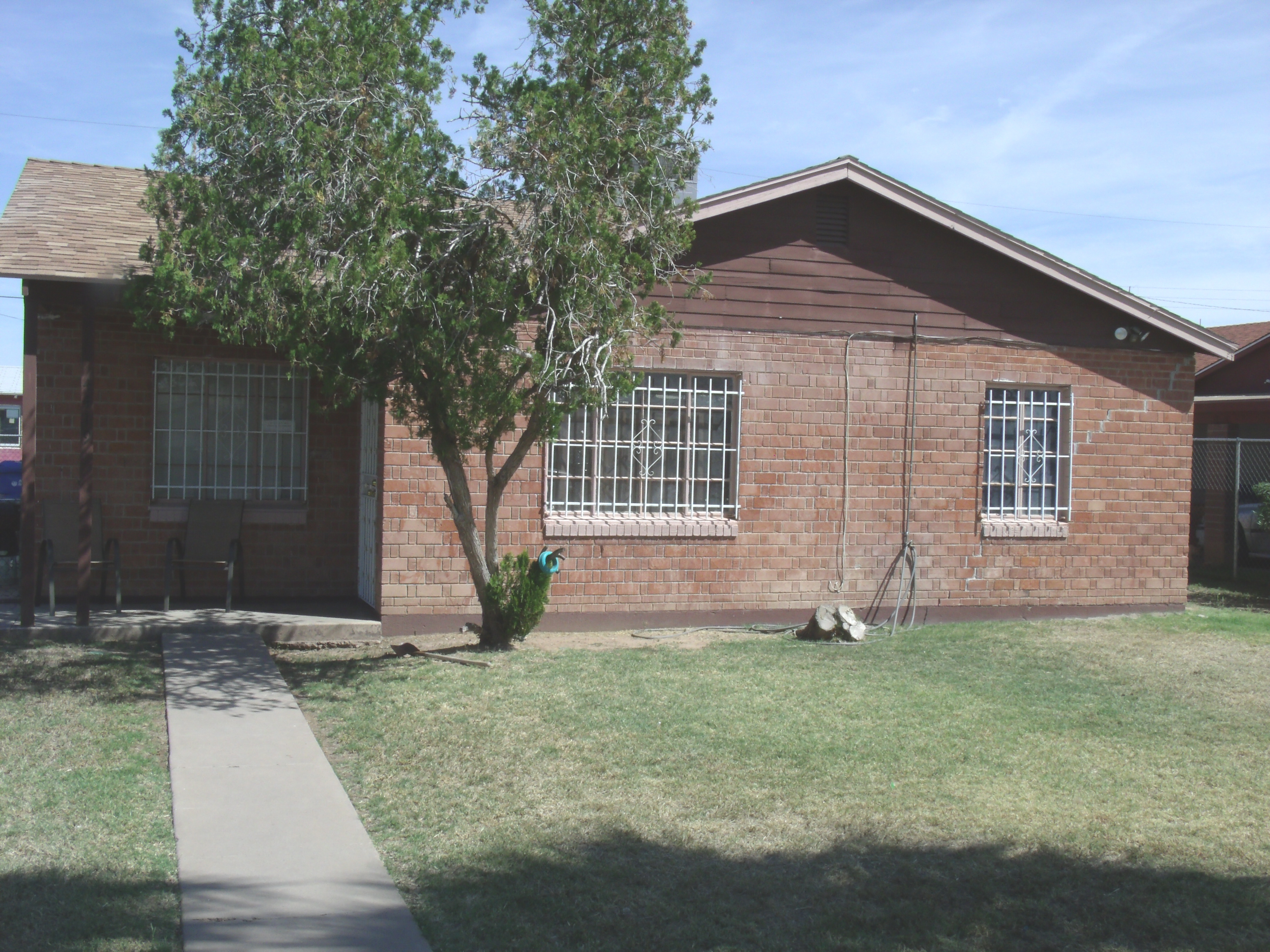
The Robert and Louise Phillips House was built in 1946 and is located at 4417 S. 19th St. In December 1946, Phoenix dentist Robert Phillips and his wife, Louise, created a subdivision called Carlotta Place. Both Dr. and Mrs. Phillips were involved in the school desegregation effort in the early 1950s, and Louise was president of the Maricopa branch of the NAACP until 1960. It was listed as historic by the Phoenix African-American Survey.

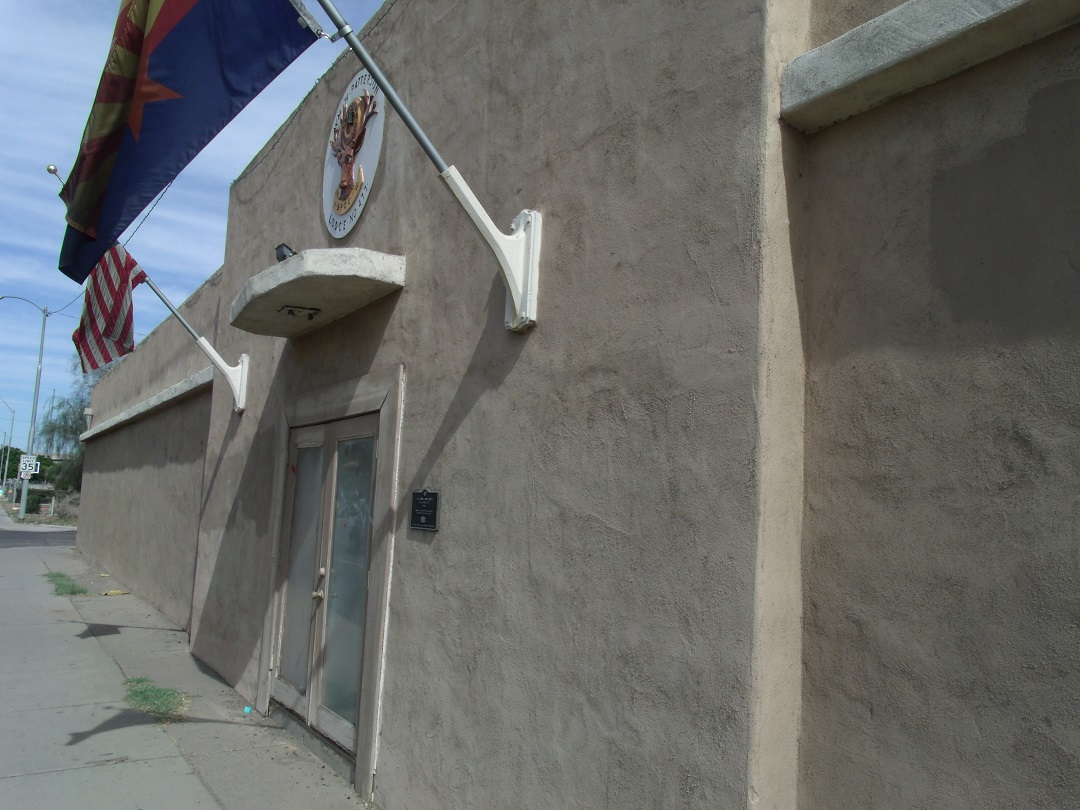
The William H. Patterson Elks Lodge No. 477 was built in 1946 and is located at 1007 S. Seventh Avenue. Built by the African-American community and named after William H. Patterson, who once was a Buffalo Soldier, in what once was a segregated Phoenix. Designated as a landmark with Historic Preservation-Landmark (HP-L) overlay zoning. It is listed in the Phoenix Historic Property Register.

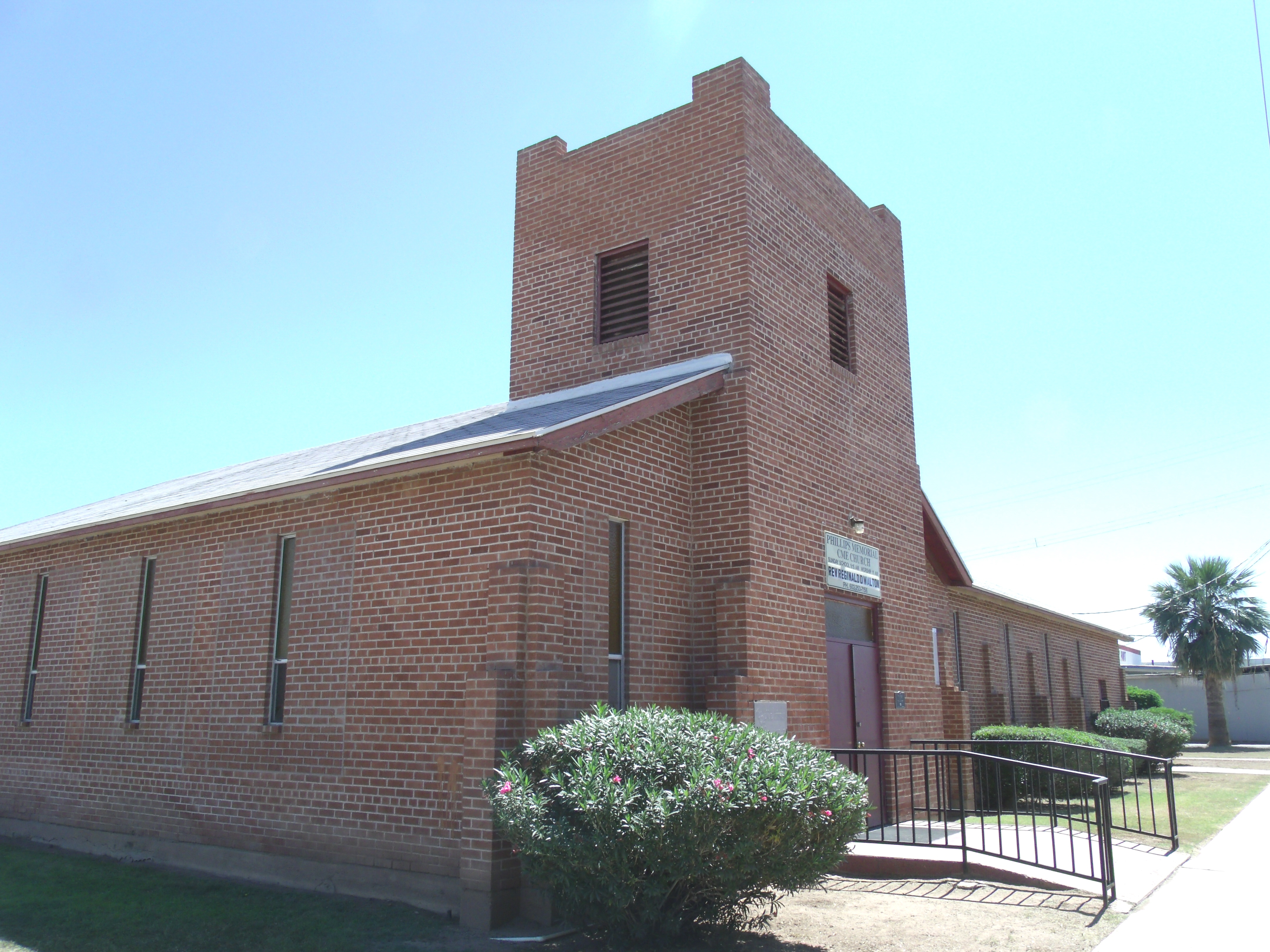
The Lucy Phillips Memorial C.M.E. Church was built in 1947 and is located at 1401 E. Adams St. The church was built by the African-American community in Phoenix. It was named Lucy Phillips Memorial C.M.E. Church in honor of the wife of the first presiding bishop, the Rev. Charles Henry Phillips. The church was listed in the Phoenix Historic Property Register in June 2005.

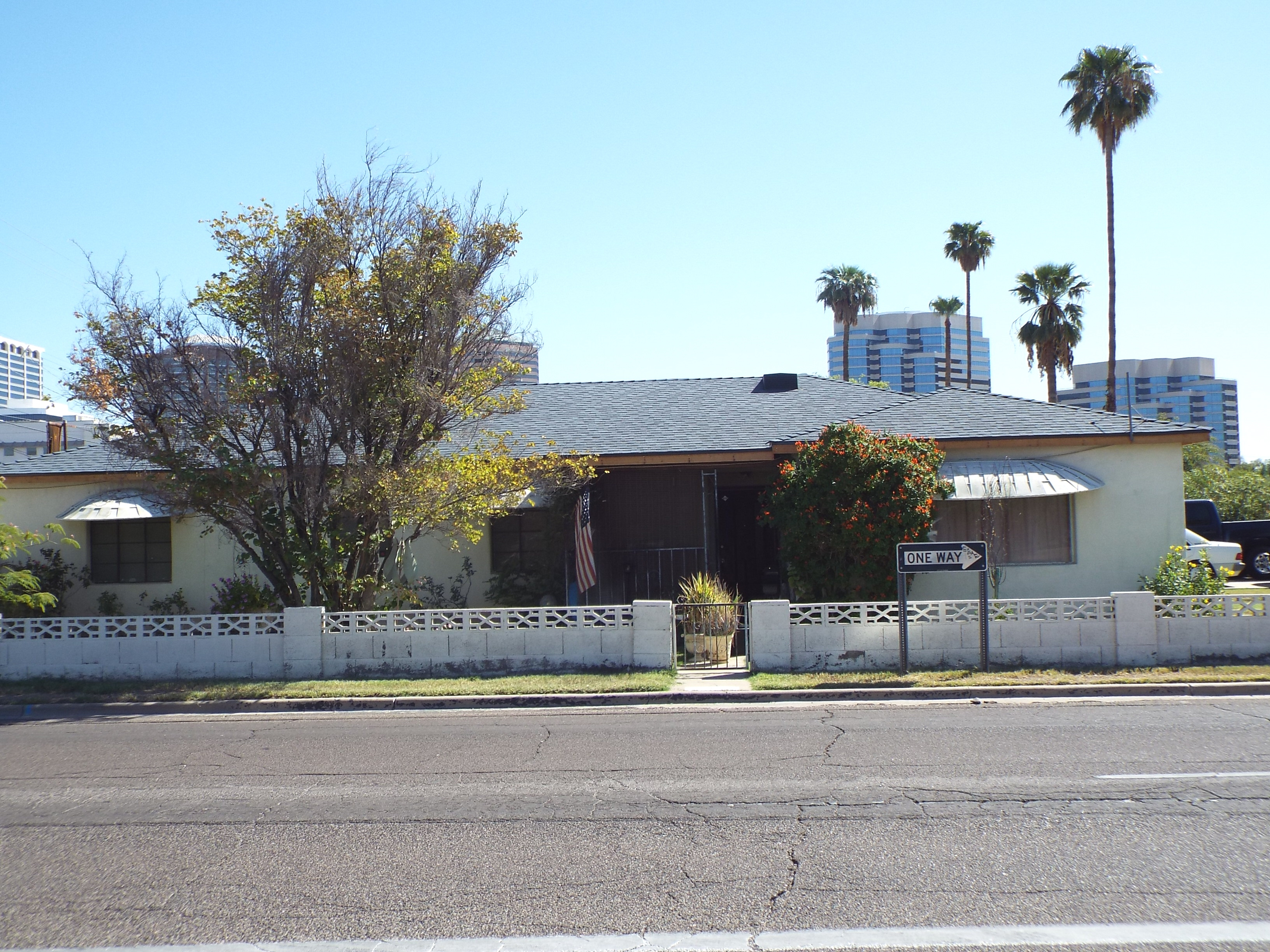
The Hazel Burton Daniels House was built in 1947 and is located at 2801 North 5th Street.

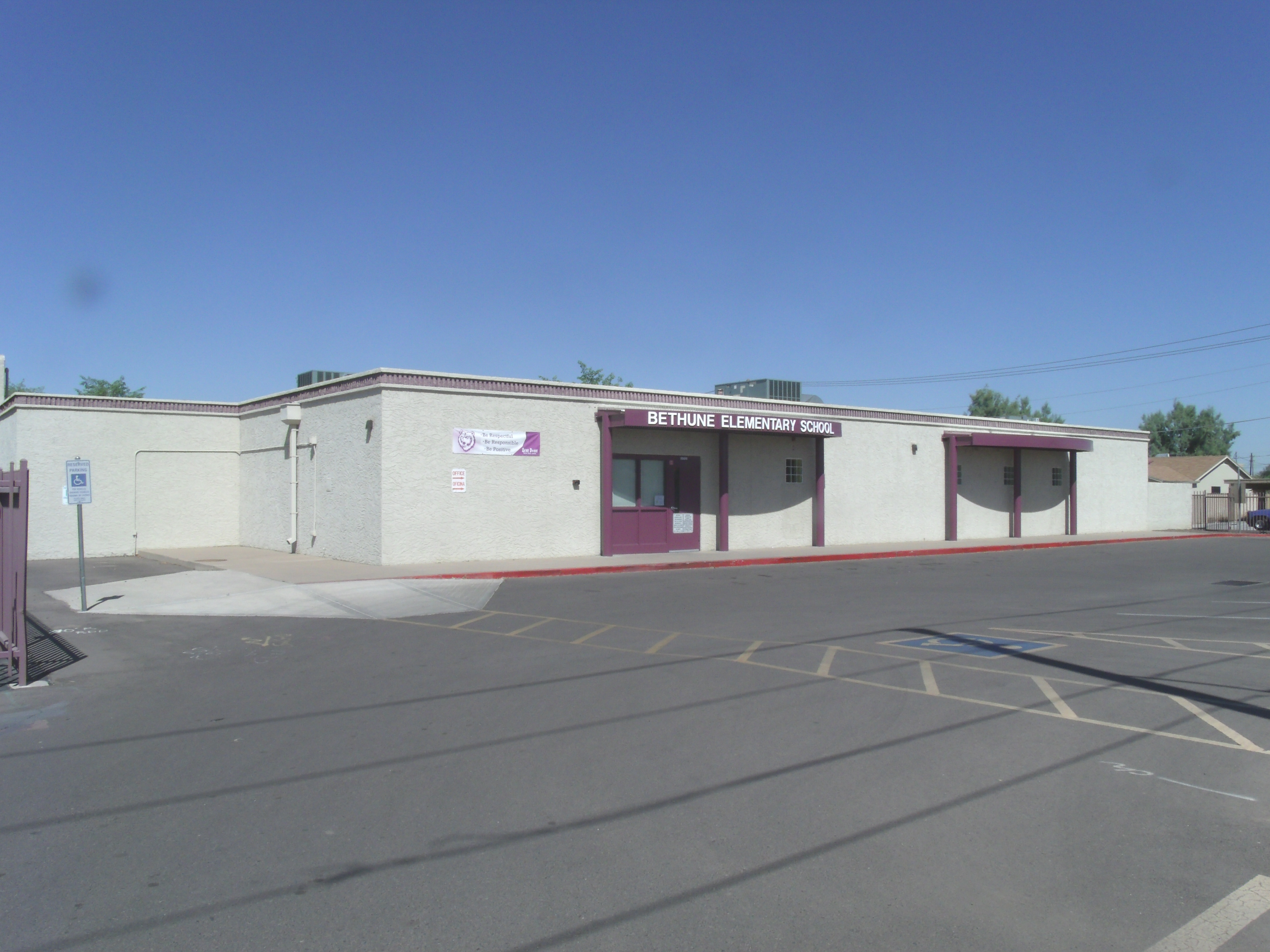
The Mary McLeod Bethune School (Bethune Elementary School) was built in 1947 and is located at 1510 S. 15th Avenue. The Mary McLeod Bethune Elementary School is another segregated school opened by the Phoenix School District. It was built to provide for the rapidly expanding Black community on the west side of Phoenix. It is listed as historic by the Phoenix African-American Survey.

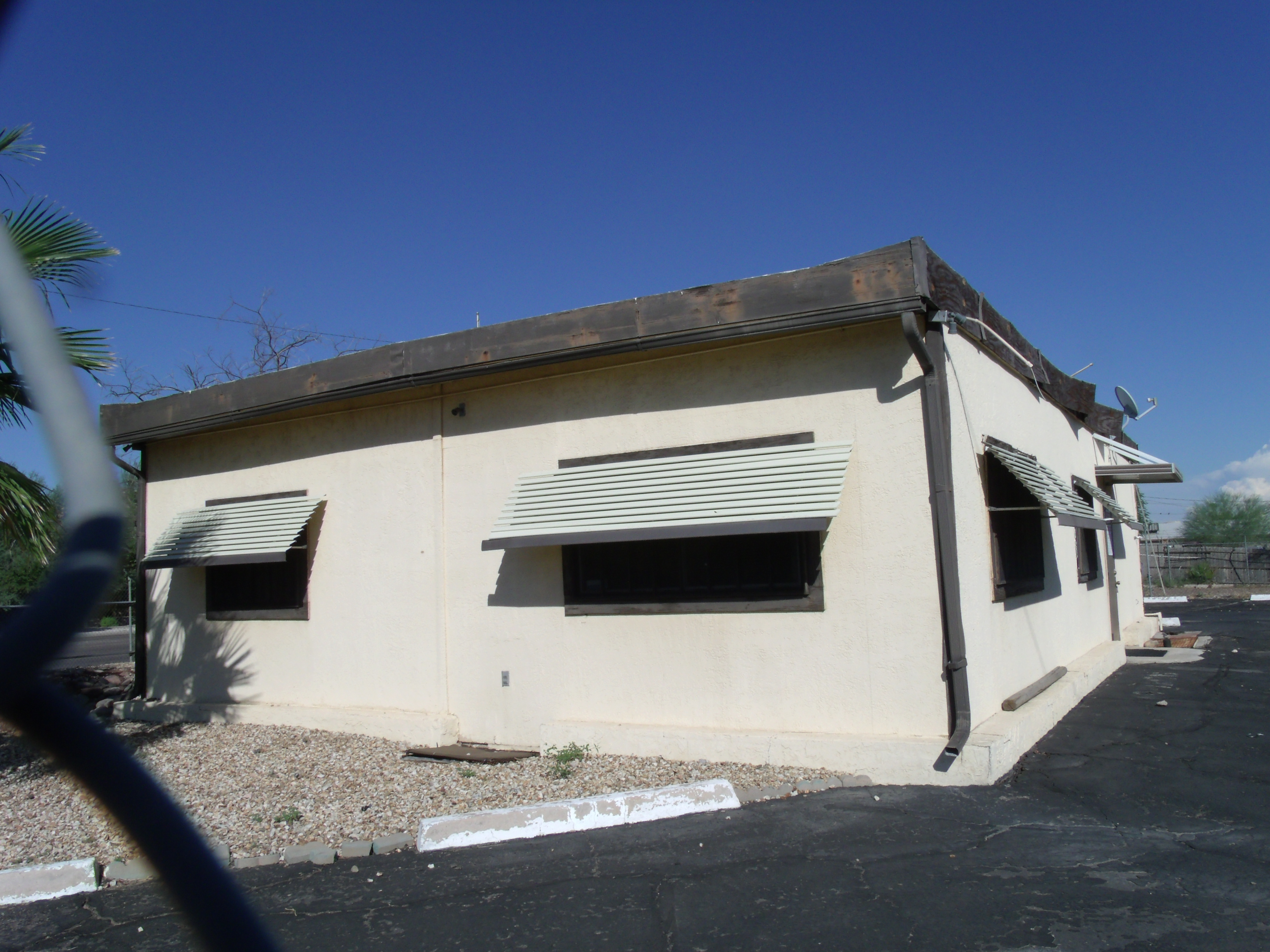
This building, located in 1203 East 11th Avenue in Phoenix, is where the Westside Theater was located in 1948. The Westside Theater was the first theater owned by an African American in Arizona. It is listed on the African American Historic Property Survey.

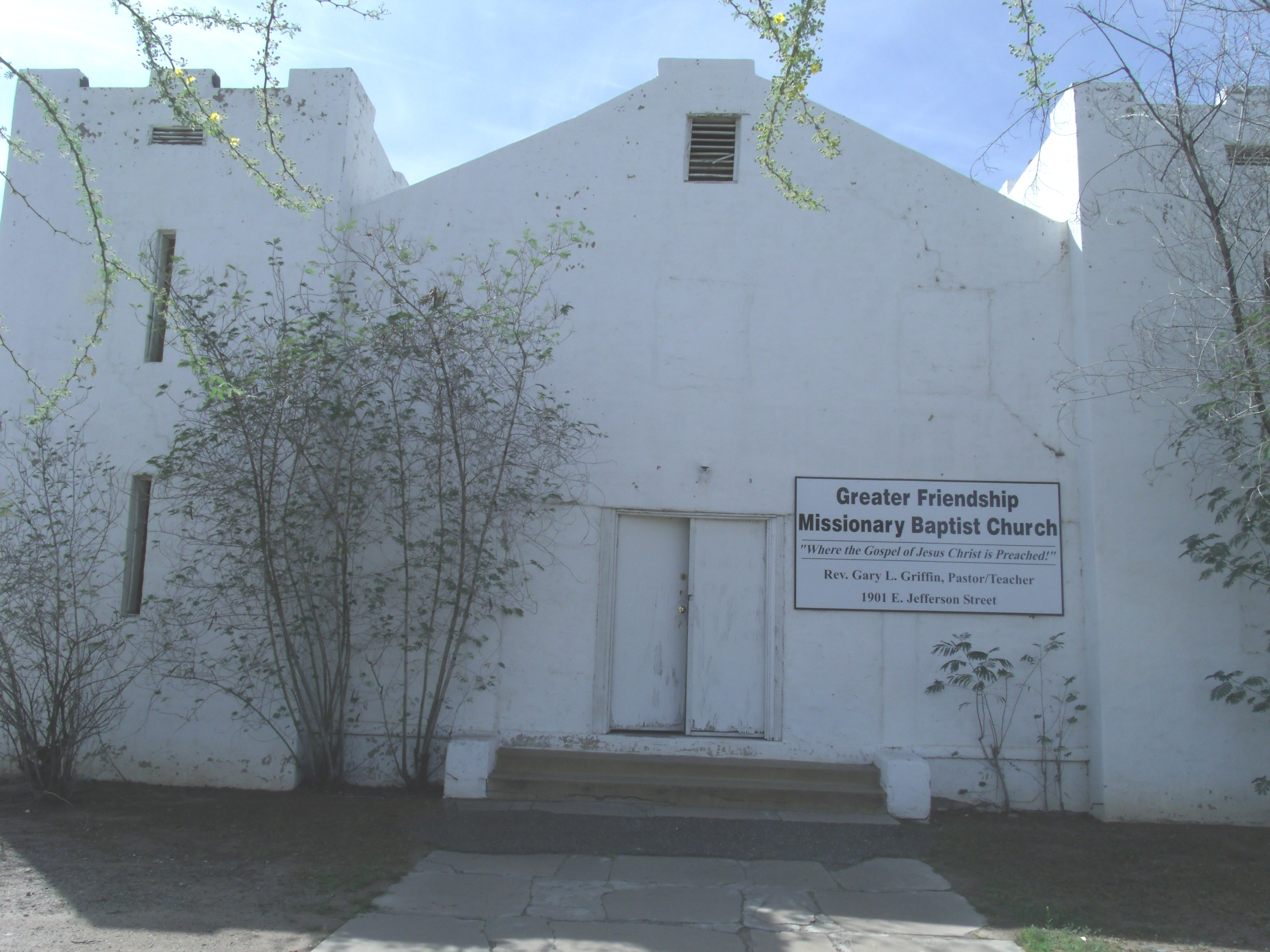
The Greater Friendship Missionary Baptist Church was built in 1949 and is located at 1901 E. Jefferson St. The Greater Friendship is one of several churches founded in the area in the 1940s. City of Phoenix historians call the building a modest Norman Revival-style of architecture, with a front parapet, gabled roof and two towers. It was listed as historic by the Phoenix African-American Survey.

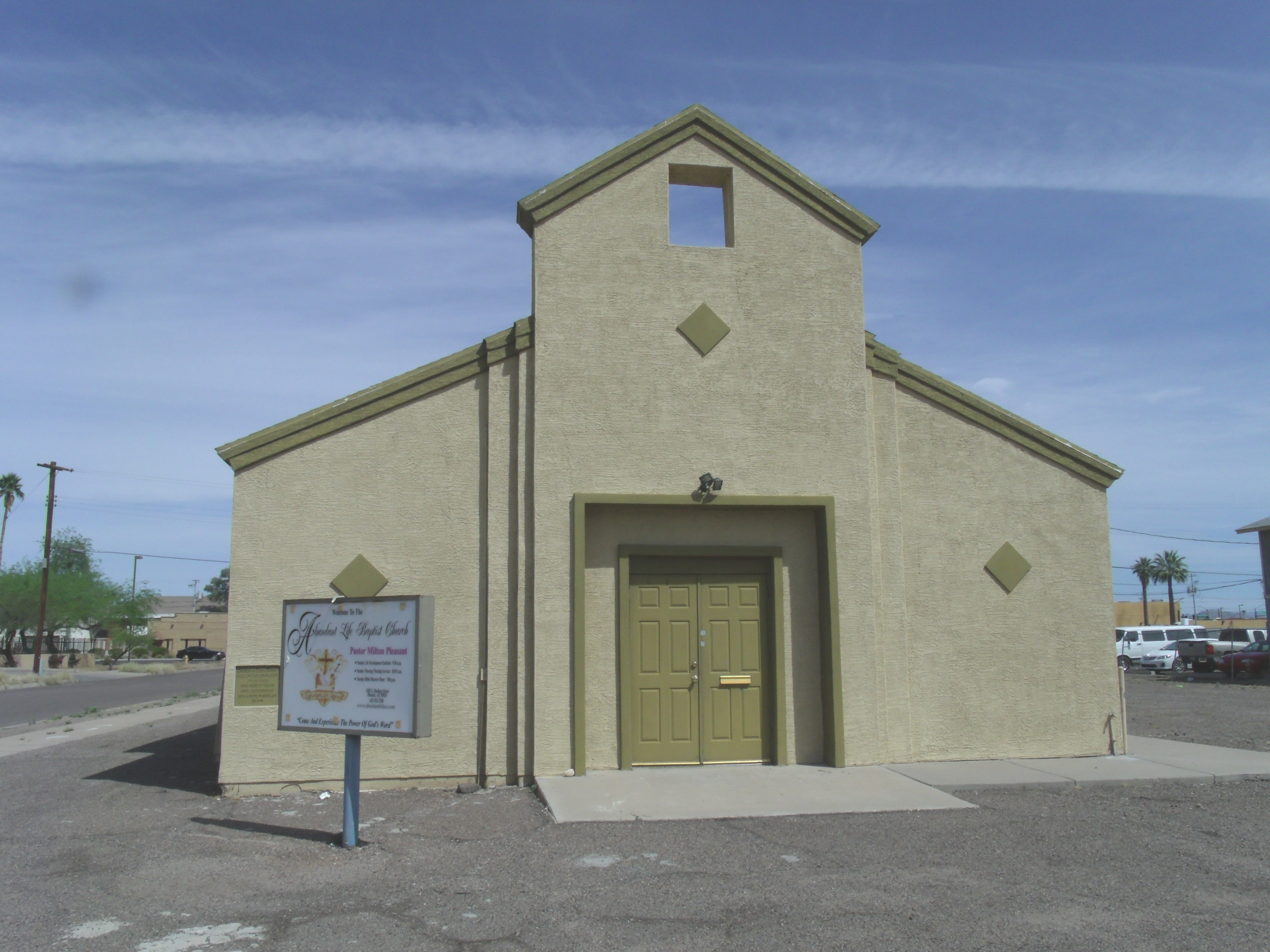
The Higher Ground Church of God in Christ was built in 1949 and is located at 1302 E. Madison St. Later called Abundant Life Baptist Church, the property was purchased by Pilgrim Rest Baptist Church in 2004. No services are currently held here, but the building is used for youth groups, funerals and other Pilgrim Rest gatherings. It was listed as historic by the Phoenix African-American Survey.

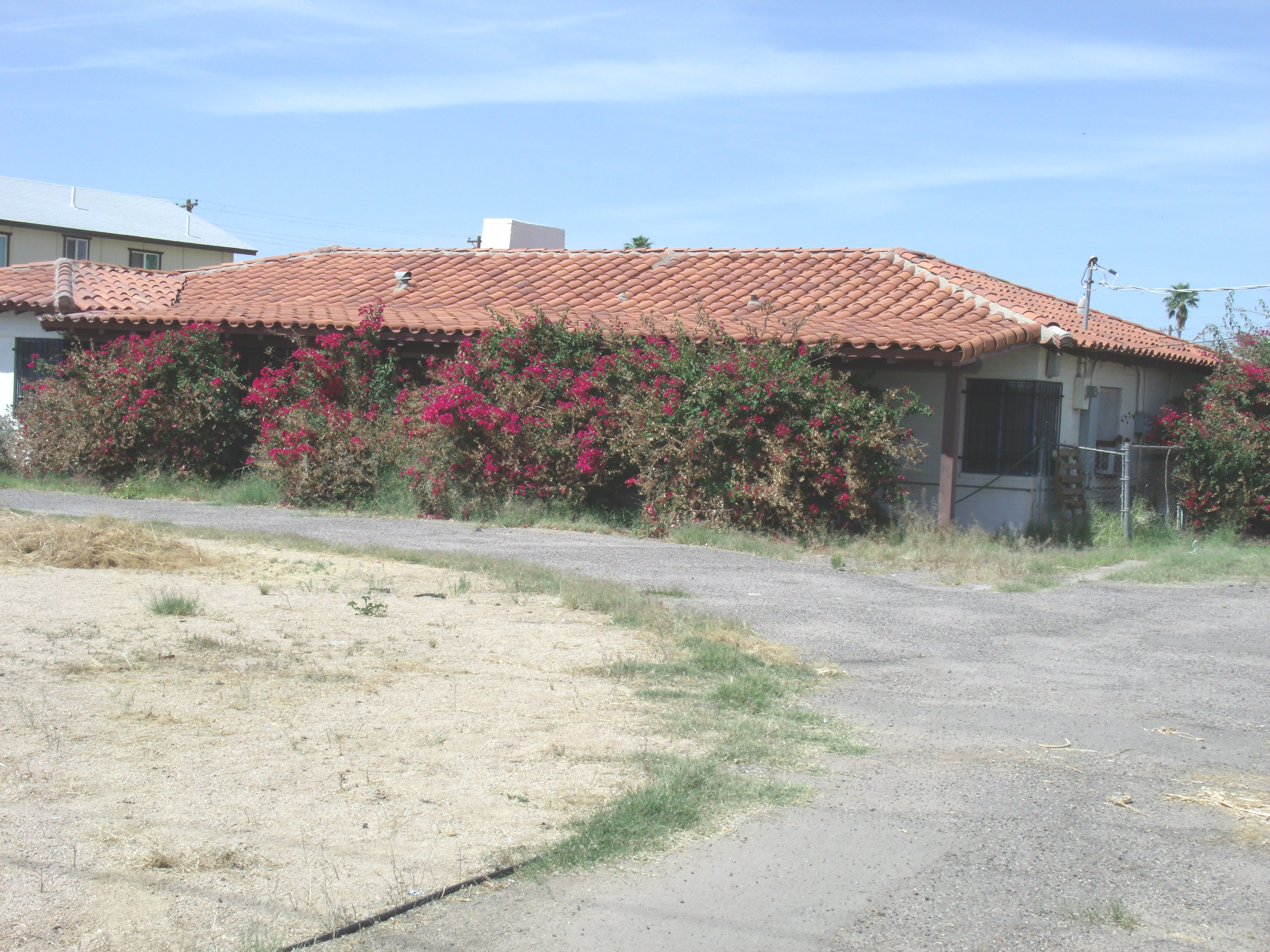
The Dr. Lowell Wormley House was built in 1949 and is located at 1910 E. Broadway Road. Dr. Lowell Wormley was born in Washington, D.C., and studied medicine at Howard University Medical School. When he arrived in Arizona in the mid-1940s, he was one of only three African-American doctors in Phoenix. He was on the staff of both St. Joseph's and Good Samaritan hospitals. He opened his own practice in 1946 in the Midtown Medical Building, 1 N. 12th St., and practiced there until the early 1980s. In 1949, he and his wife, Olivia, built this home on East Broadway Road. The house was listed in the Phoenix Historic Property Register in June 2005.

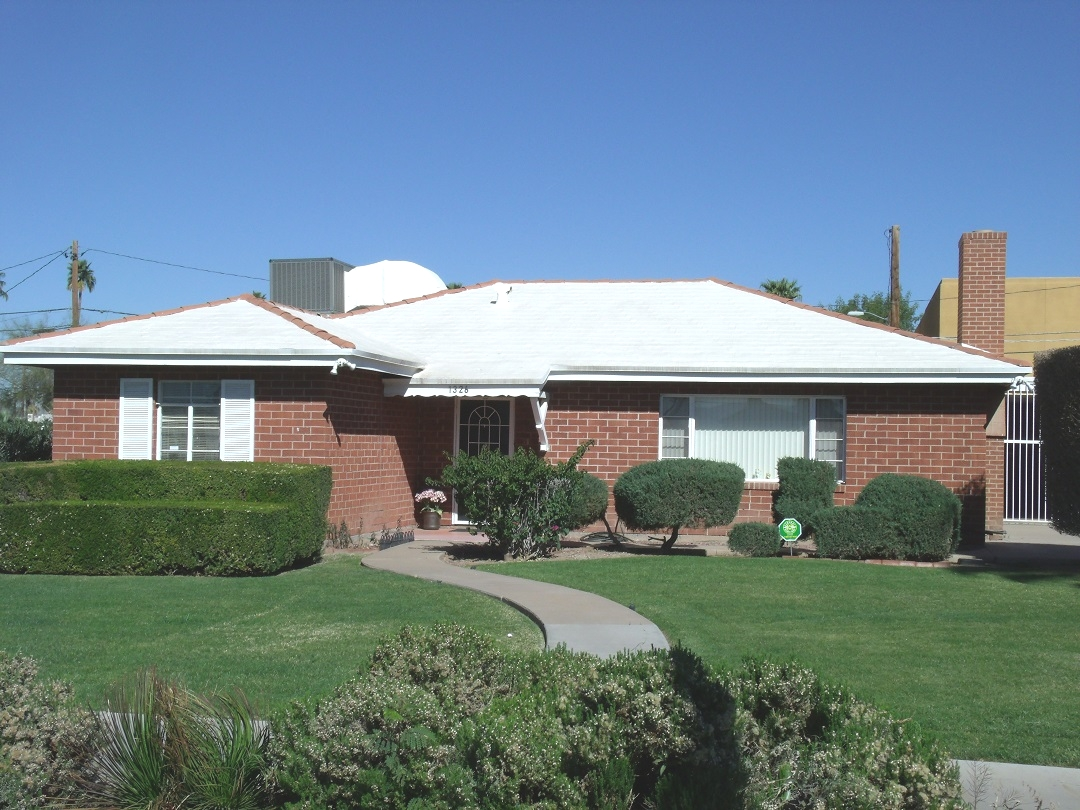
The Aldridge House, also known as Aubrey and Winstona Aldridge House, is located at 1326 E. Jefferson St. and was built in 1950. It was the home of Winstona Hackett, daughter of Dr. Winston Hackett the first African-American doctor in the area, and her husband Aubrey Aldridge. Designated as a landmark with Historic Preservation-Landmark (HP-L) overlay zoning. It is listed in the Phoenix Historic Property Register (PHPR).

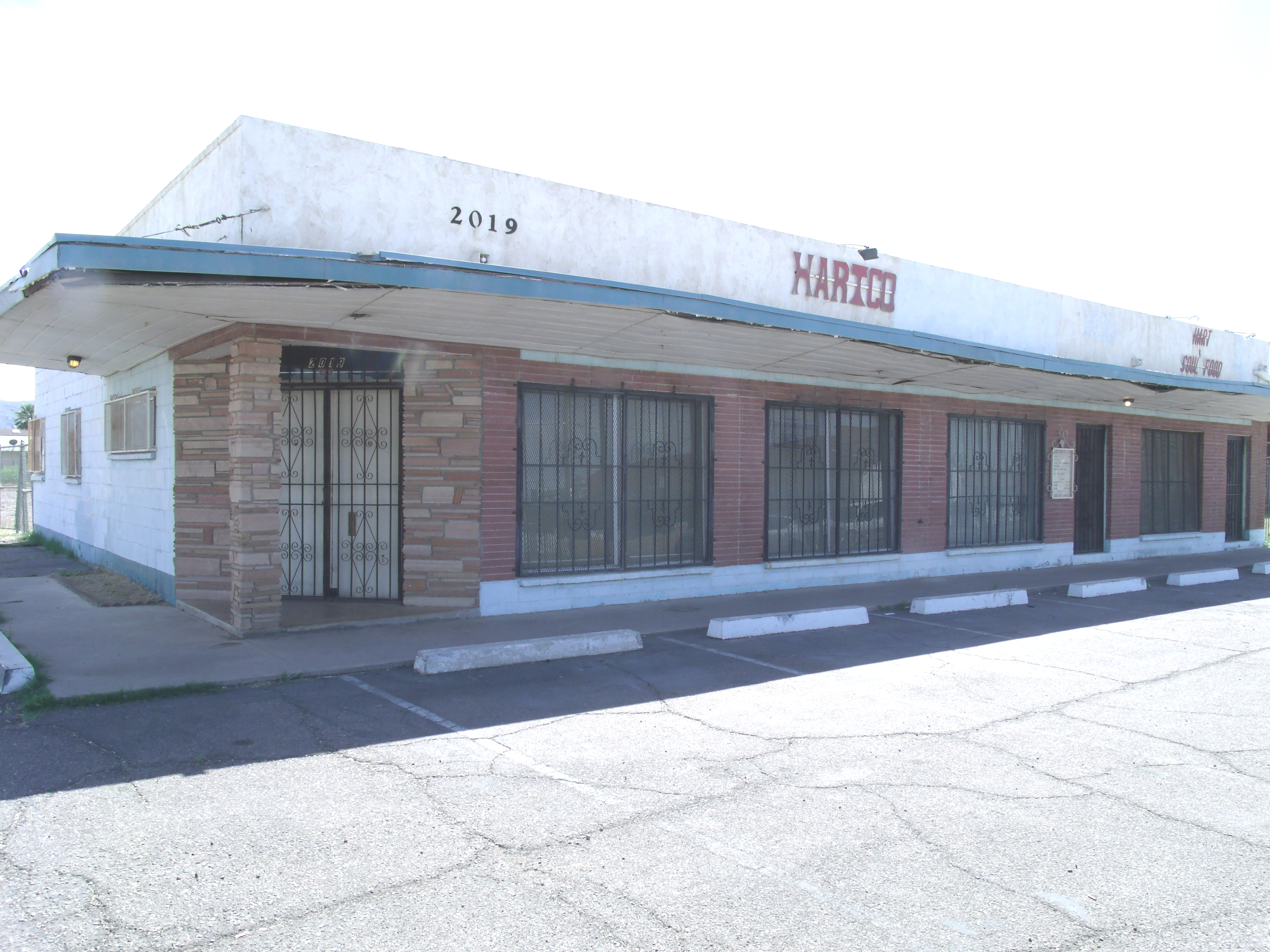
The Progressive Builders Association Building was built in 1953 and is located at 2019 E. Broadway Road. The Progressive Builders Association built homes in downtown Phoenix, giving many African Americans their first opportunity to buy a brand-new home. In 1945, members of the community met at the First Institutional Baptist Church and formed the Progressive Builders Association. It was listed as historic by the Phoenix African-American Survey, in the Phoenix Historic Property Register in June 2005 and in the National Register of Historic Places.

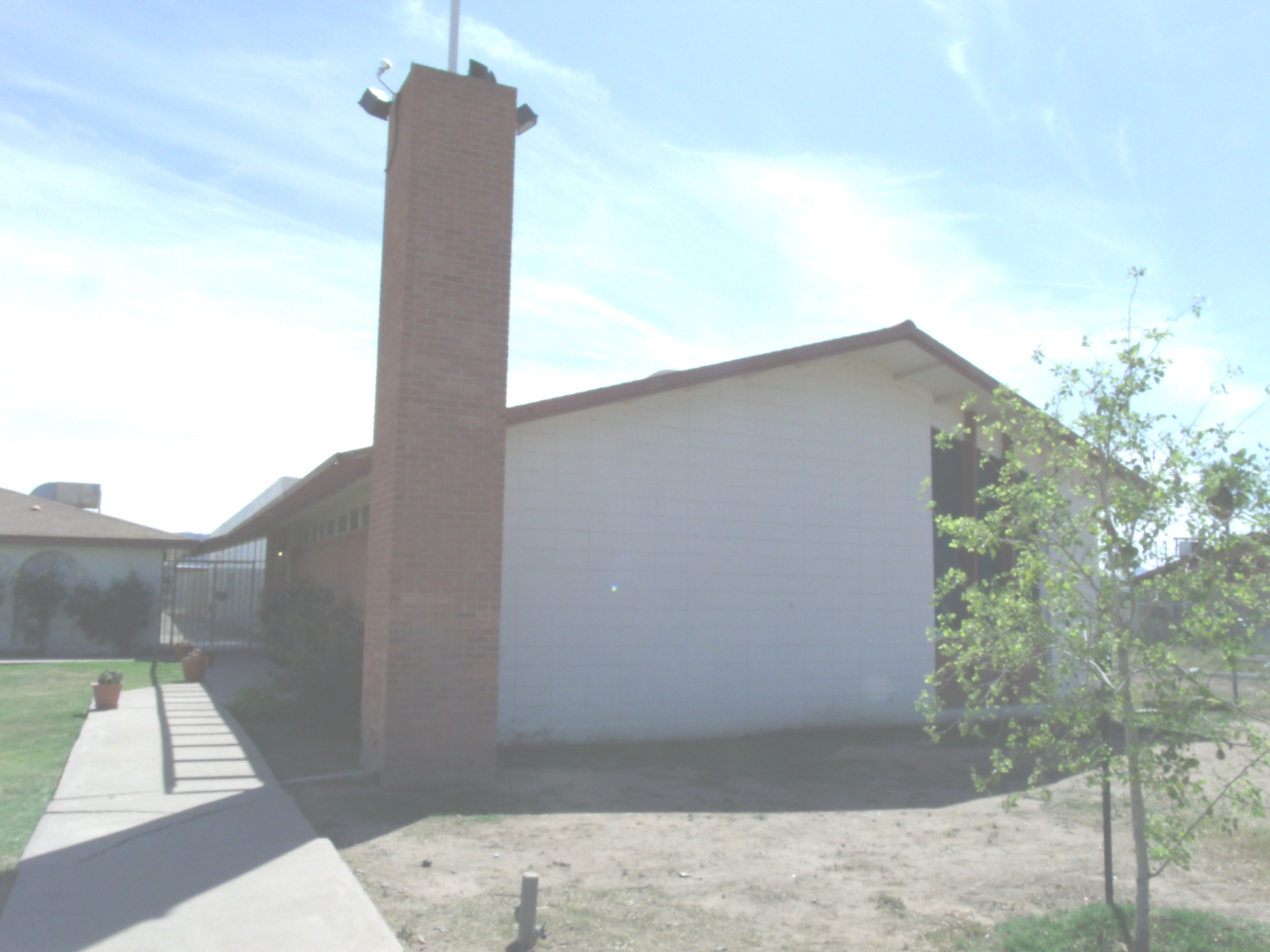
The Southminster Presbyterian Church was built in 1954 and is located at 1923 E. Broadway Road It was the only African-American Presbyterian church in Phoenix when it was founded in 1954. The Rev. George Benjamin Brooks, a Phoenix civil-rights leader, was the founding pastor. It was listed as historic by the Phoenix African-American Survey.

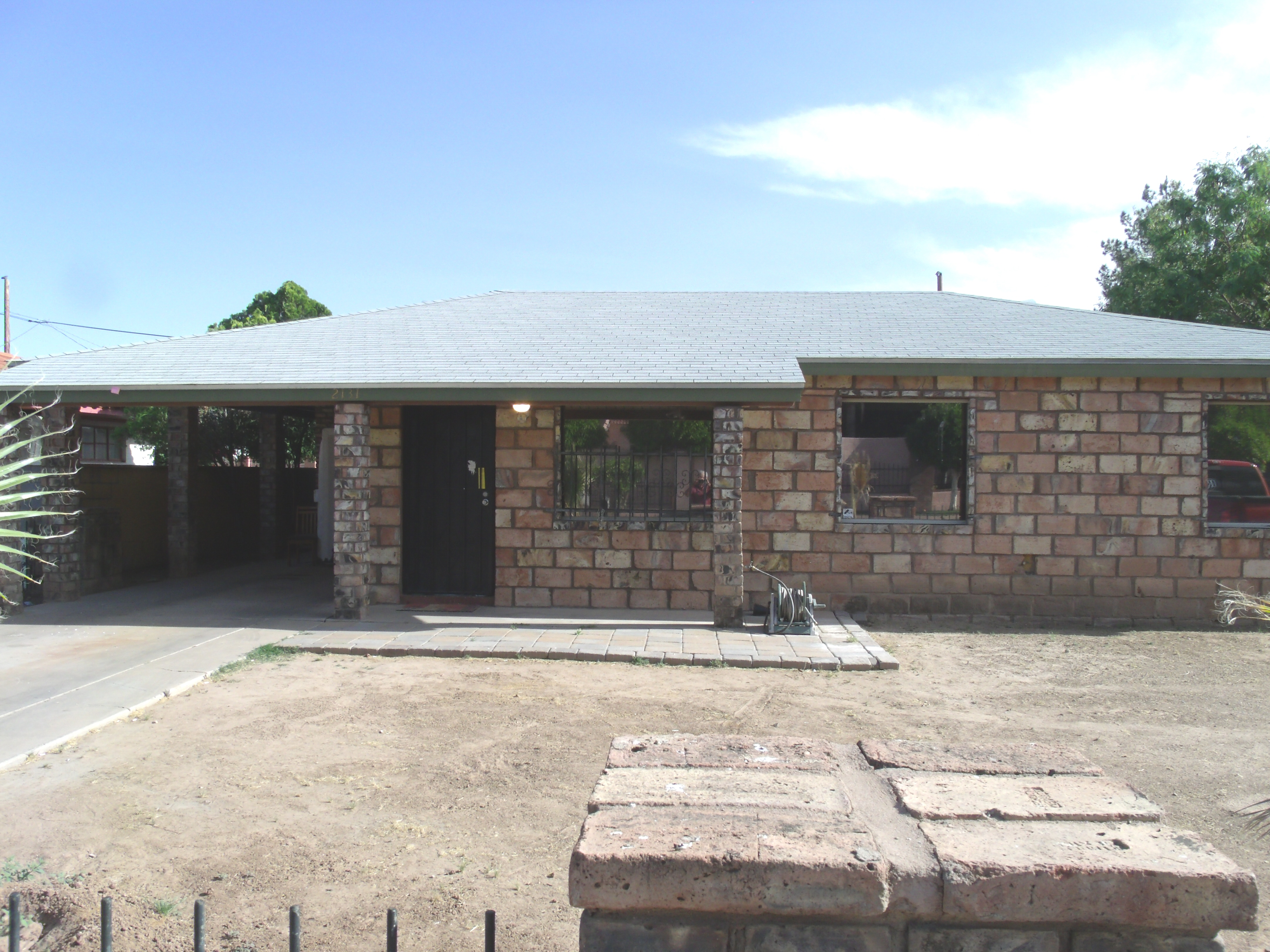
The Morrison E. Warren House was built in 1956 and is located at 2131 E. Violet Dr. Morrison E. Warren was the first African American elected to the Phoenix City Council (1966 to 1970). He also served as vice-mayor from 1972 to 1994. The property was listed as historic by the Phoenix African-American Survey.

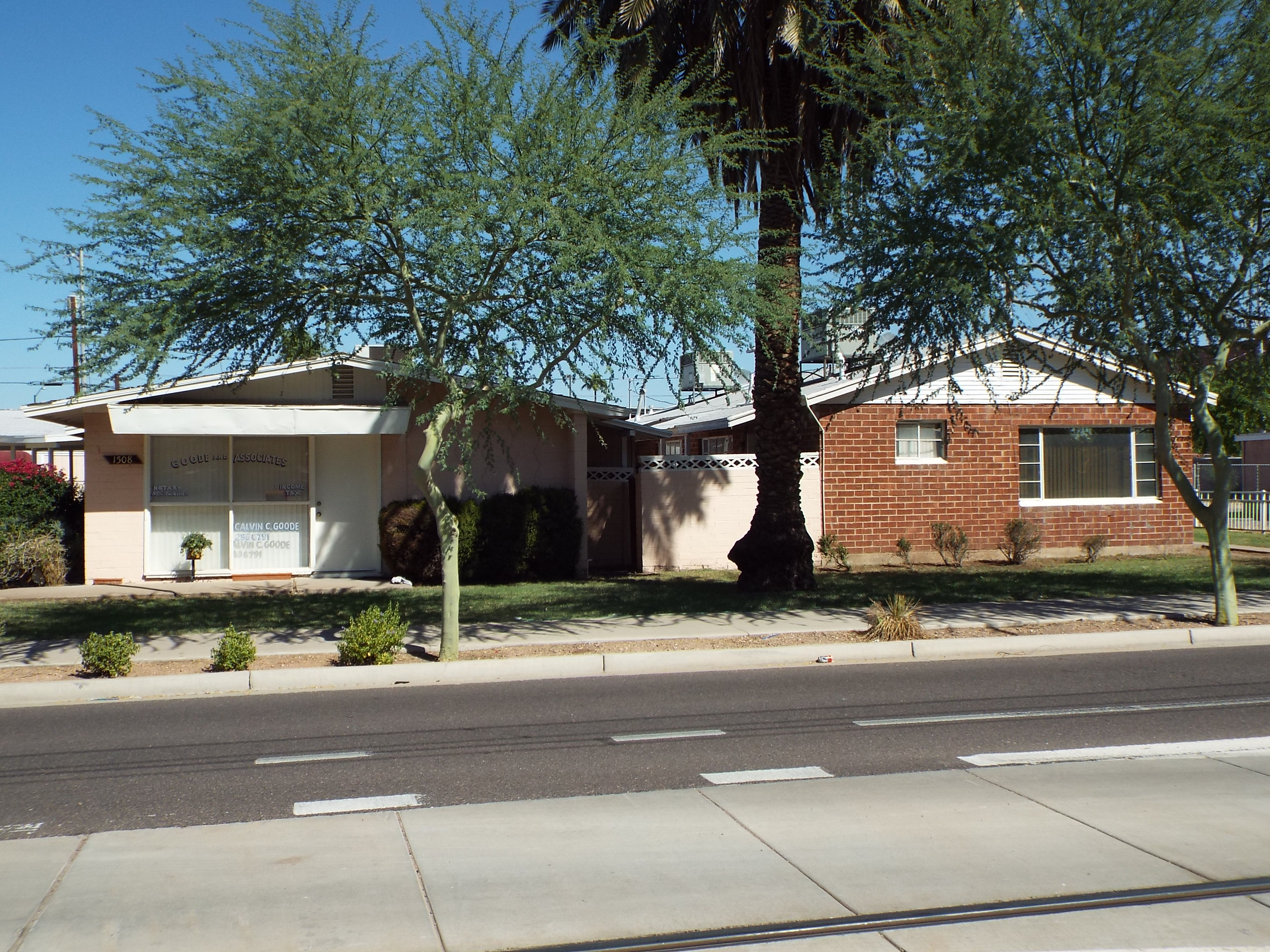
The Calvin and Georgie Goode Duplex House were built in 1959 (1508) and 1959 (1510) and is located at 1508-10 East Jefferson Street. Calvin Goode served a Phoenix City Councilman for 22 years. His wife, Georgie Goode, was a Civil Rights leader and activist. It is recognized as historical by the City of Phoenix African-American Survey.

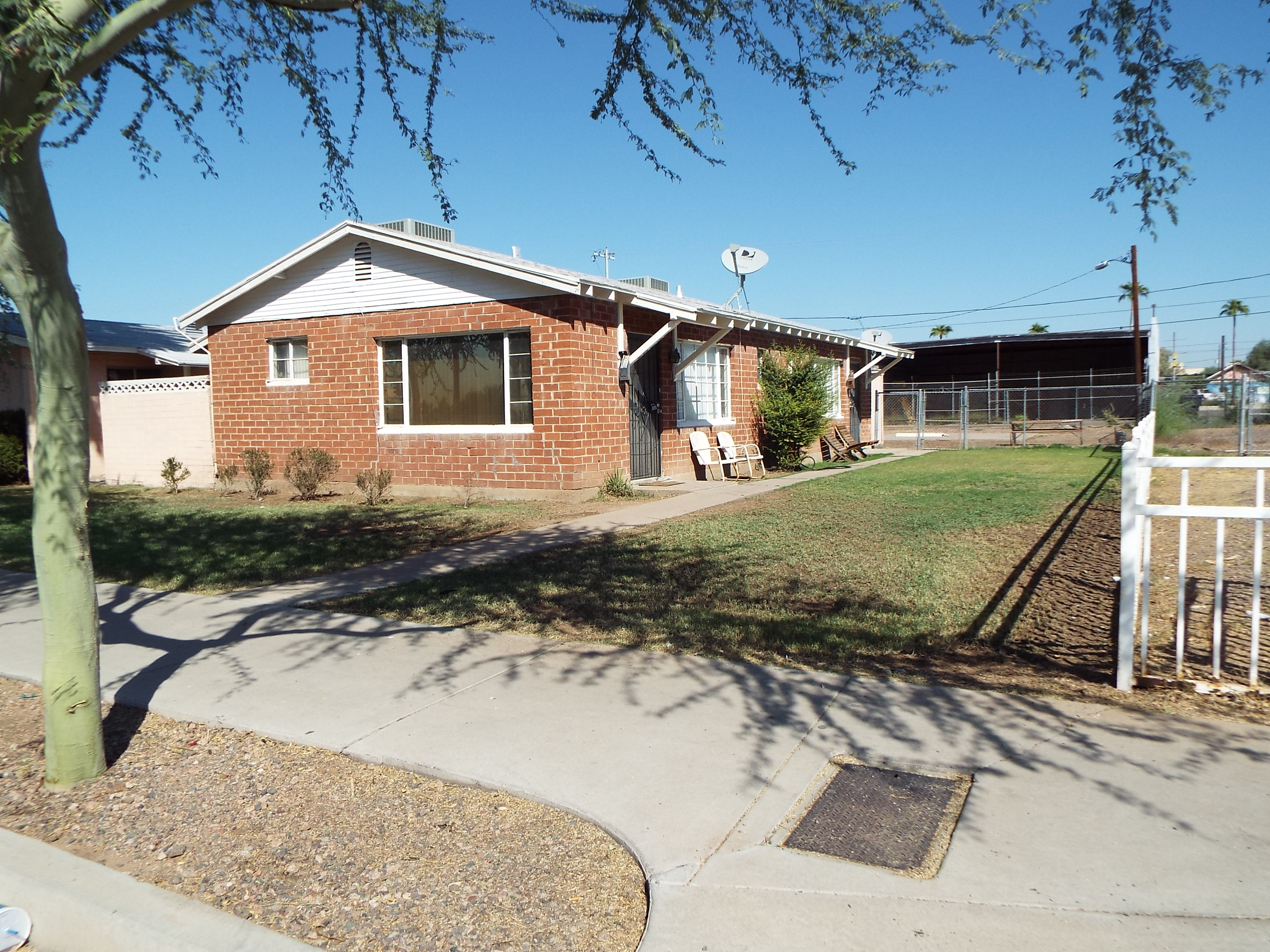
Part of the Calvin and Georgie Goode Duplex House (5010) where the Ragsdale;s once resided.

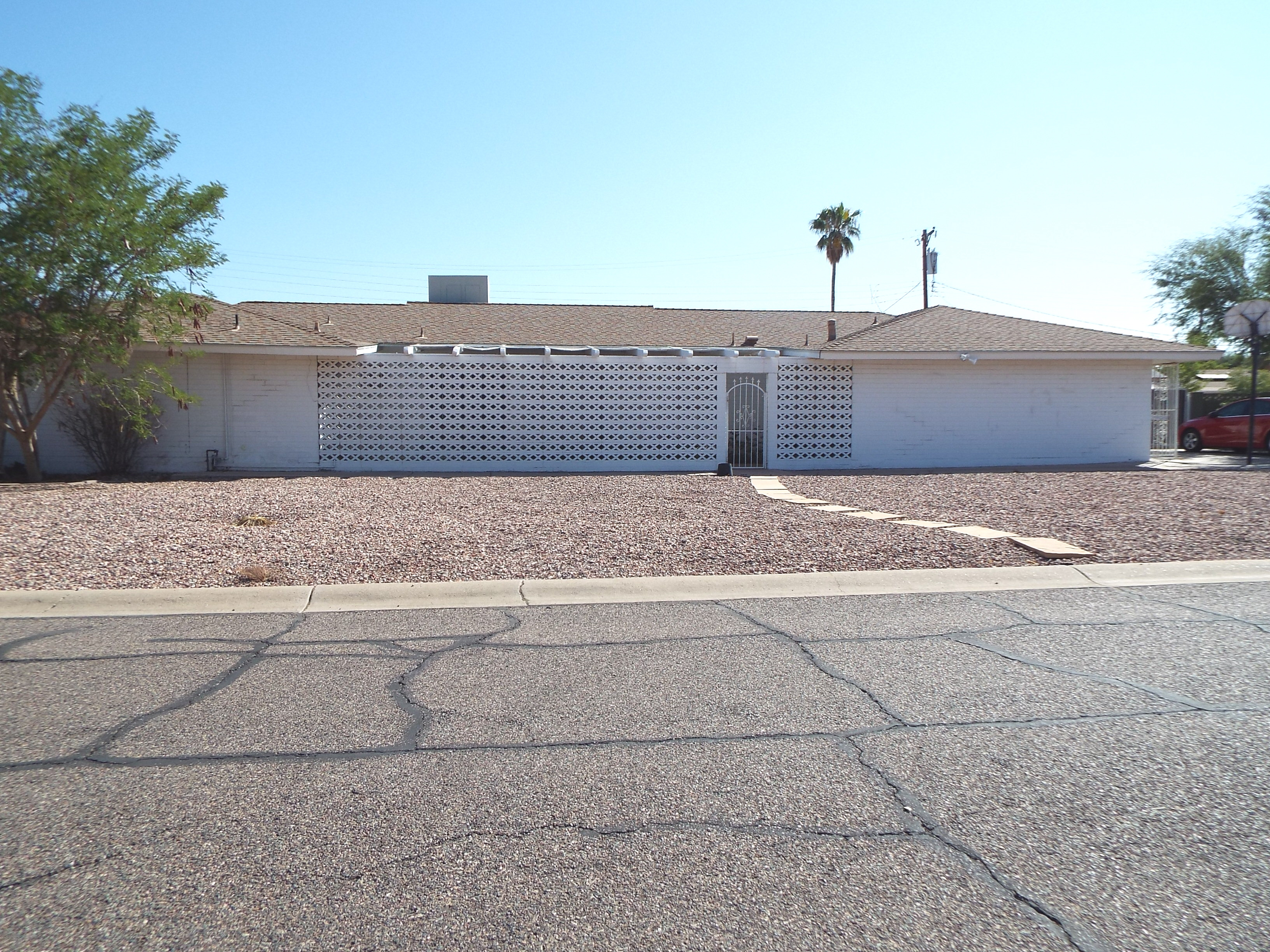
The John Ford Smith House built in 1959 and located at 5025 S. 21 Way.

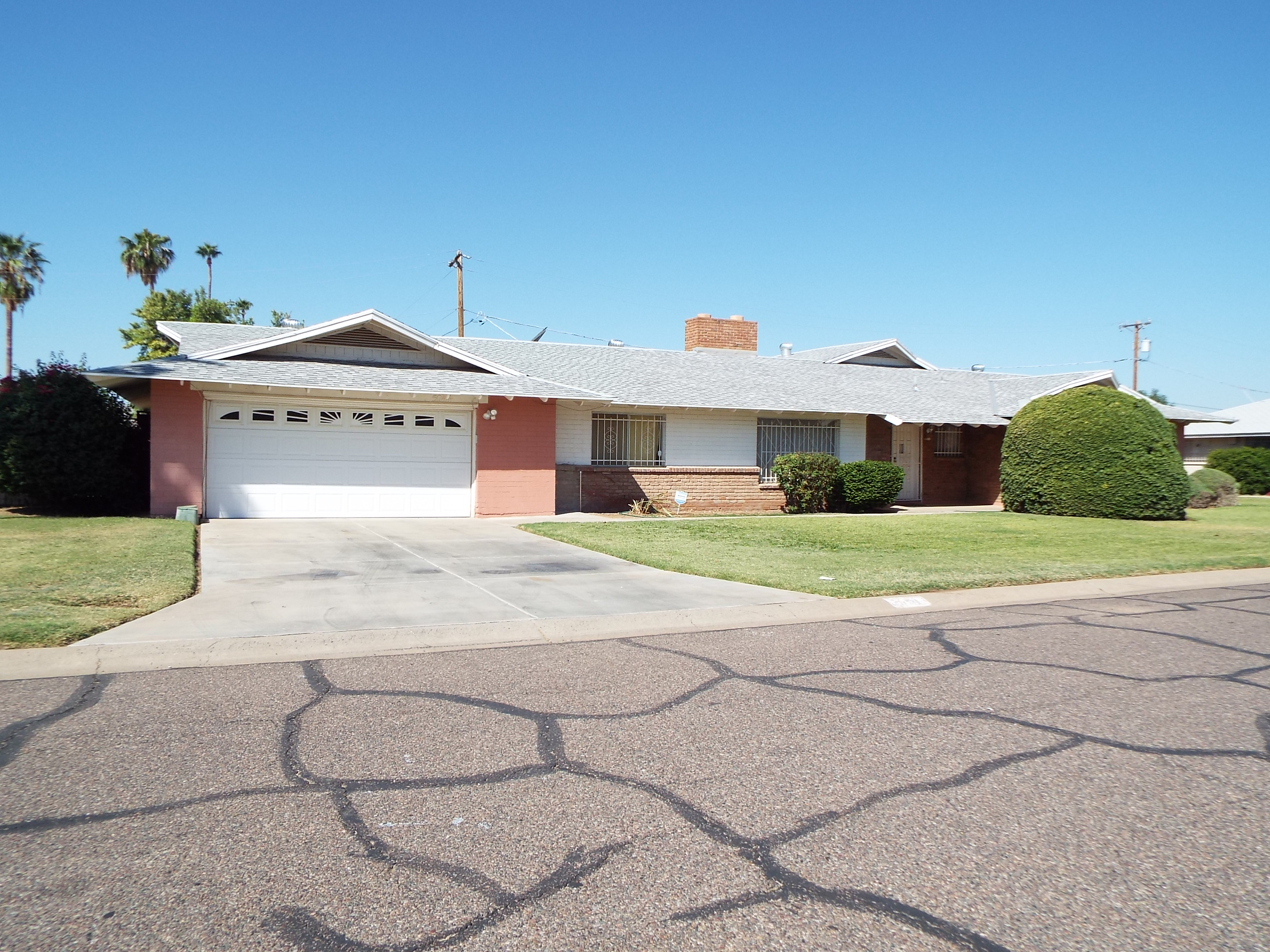
The Travis Williams House built in 1959 and located at 5044 S. 21 Way.
Asian Americans
- Dea Hong Toy – Toy was born in China and moved to Phoenix in 1923. He was a successful merchant. Toy was among those in the Asian community of Phoenix who in 1938 founded the Chinese Chamber of Commerce to protect and promote their businesses.
- Wing F. Ong – Ong lived in a house in the rear of his grocery store which is listed here. He ran for the state House of Representatives as a Democrat in 1946 and was elected, the first Chinese American in the country to achieve such status. Over the course of his career, he was elected twice to the state House and once to the state Senate.
- Lee Jew – Jew was a Chinese merchant who owned the "Lee Jew Market" on E. Jefferson St. He was influential as a leader in the Phoenix Chinese community.
Historic Asian-American Properties
(including buildings, schools, churches and homes)
National Register of Historic Places=(NRHP)
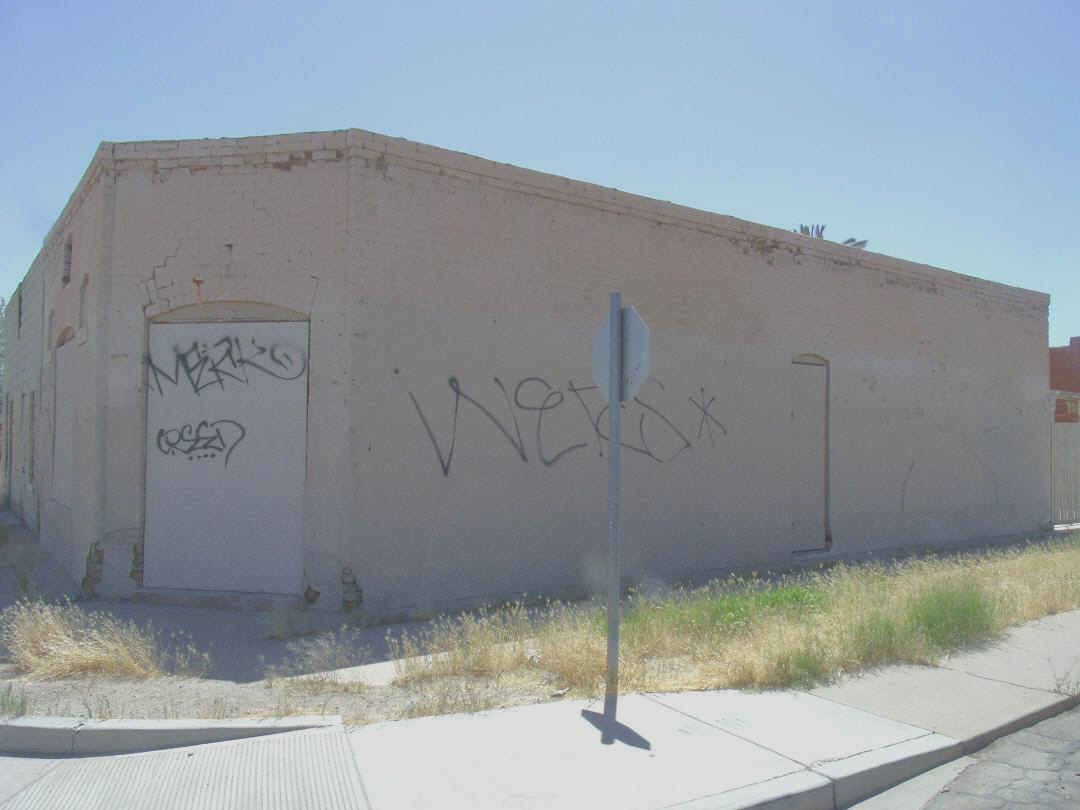
The Yaun Ah Gim Groceries is located at 1002 S. 4th Avenue. The building which was built in 1900 is in a state of abandonment. It was added to the National Register of Historic Places July 8, 1986. Reference number 86001553 (NRHP).

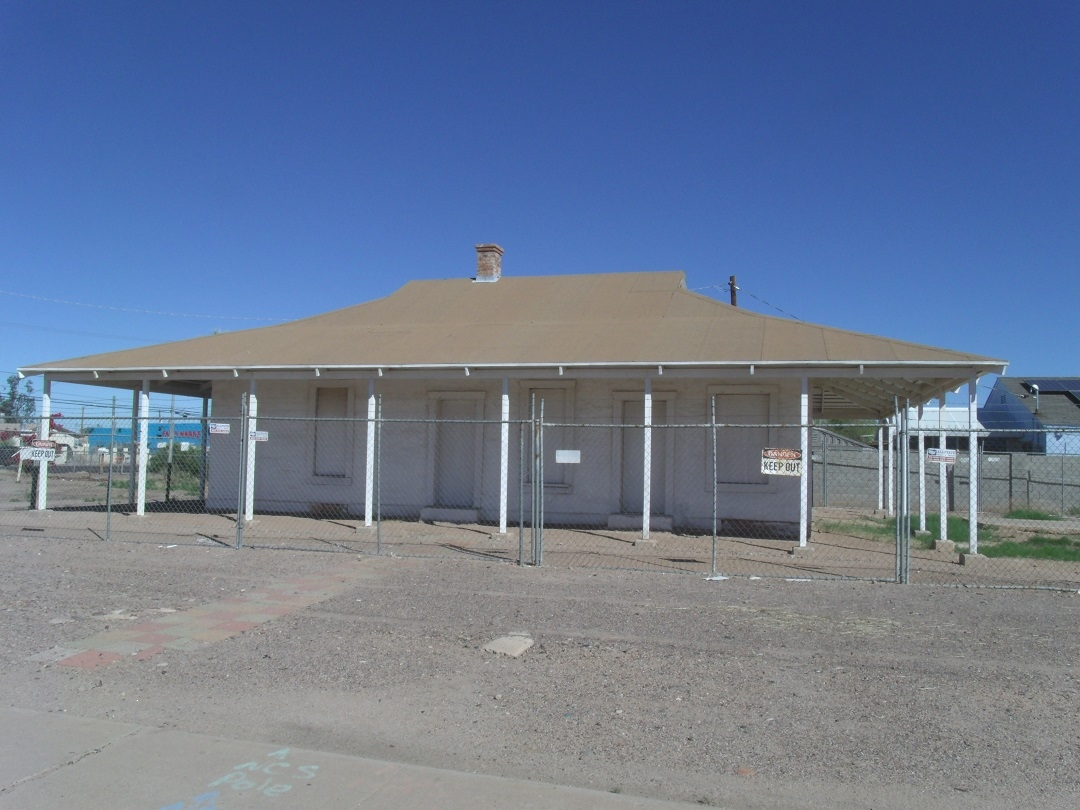
The Kunz-Carbajal House, located at 1721 S. Seventh Avenue was built in 1904. Felix Carbajal was one of first Filipino residents in Phoenix.

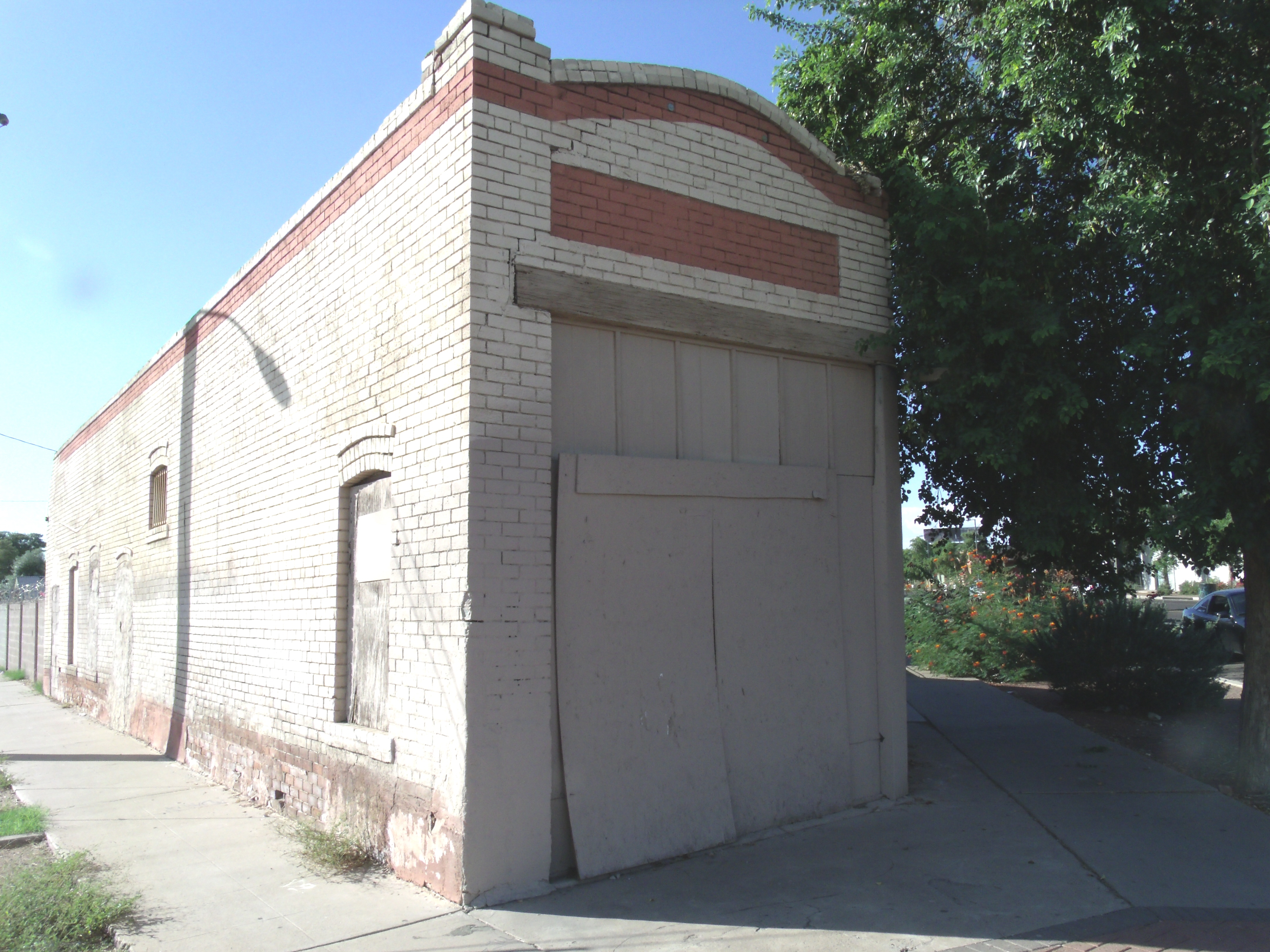
The K.S. Tang Grocery building was built in 1914 and is located at 901 Northwest Grand Avenue. The property was leased to Chinese grocers, Yung Yee Ghee from 1916 to 1920, and to K. S. Tang from 1928 to 1937. This property is recognized as historic by the Asian American Historic Property Survey. On October 1, 1985, the building was listed in the National Register of Places together with its neighbor, the Durand Grocery as Durand Grocery, ref. #85002891.

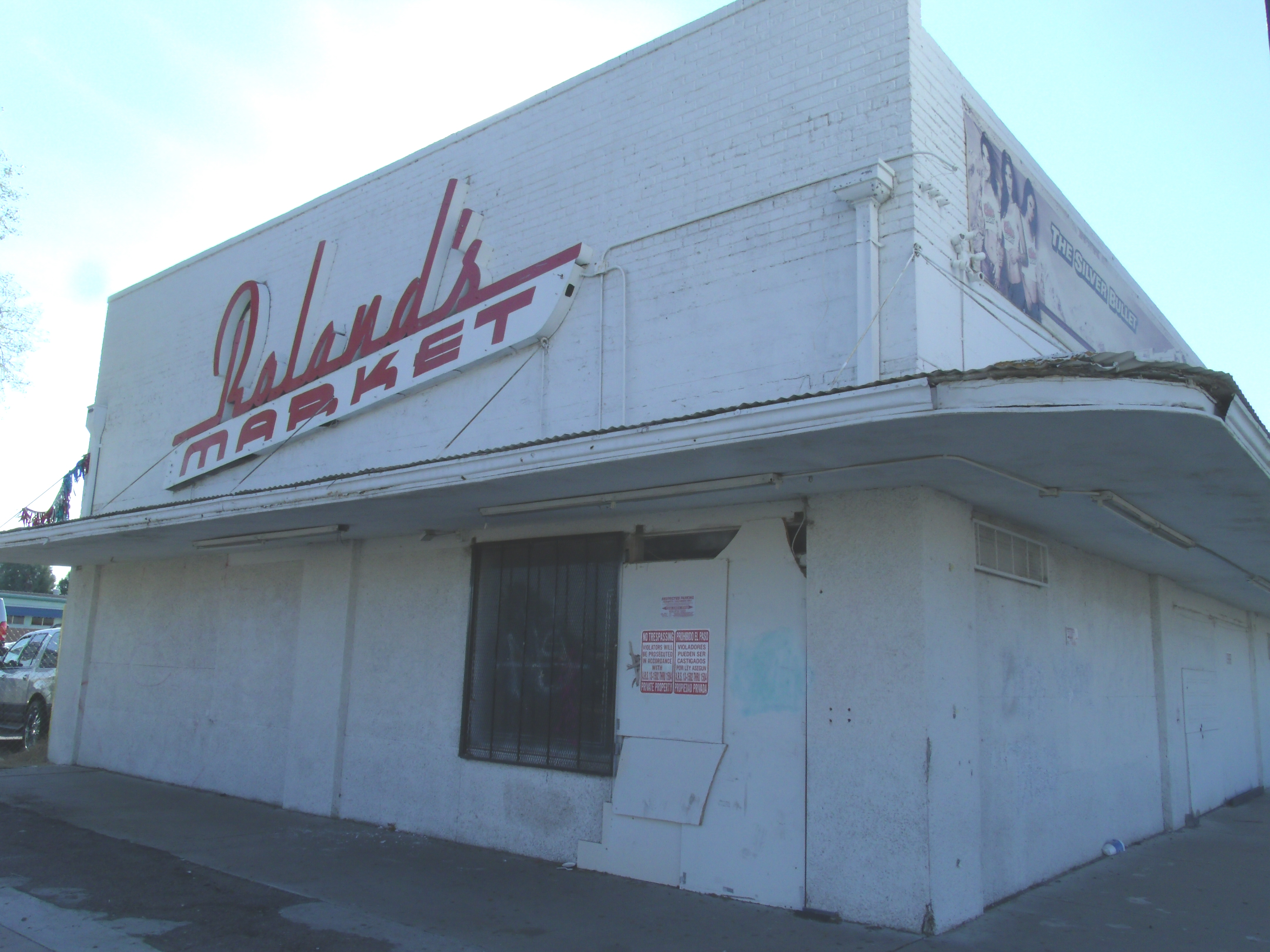
The Roland's Market building was built in 1917 and is located at 1505 East Van Buren Street. This property is recognized as historic by the Asian American Historic Property Survey.

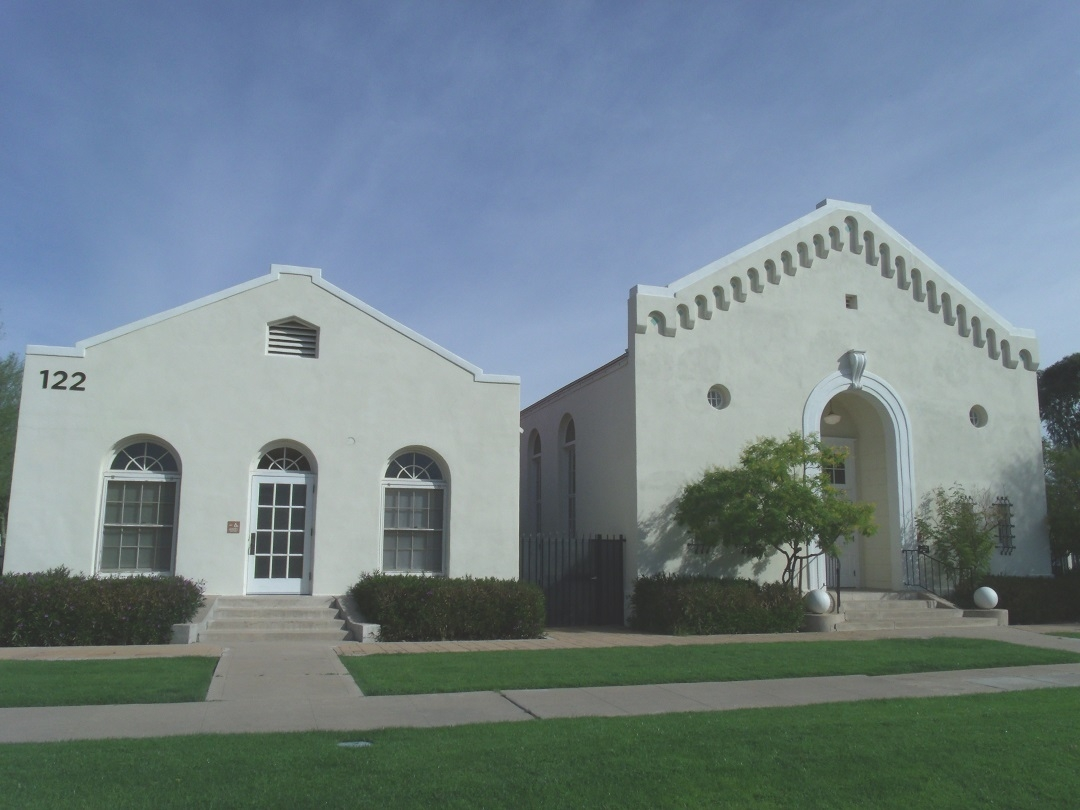
The Temple Beth Israel (1922)/ First Chinese Baptist Church (1957)/ Iglesia Bautista Central (1981) was built in 1922 and is located at 122 E. Culver St. It was Phoenix's first synagogue and the building later served as Phoenix's first Chinese Baptist Church and from 1981 to 2002, the Hispanic community as the Iglesia Bautista Central. It was listed in the National Register of Historic Places on February 22, 2011, reference #11000043.

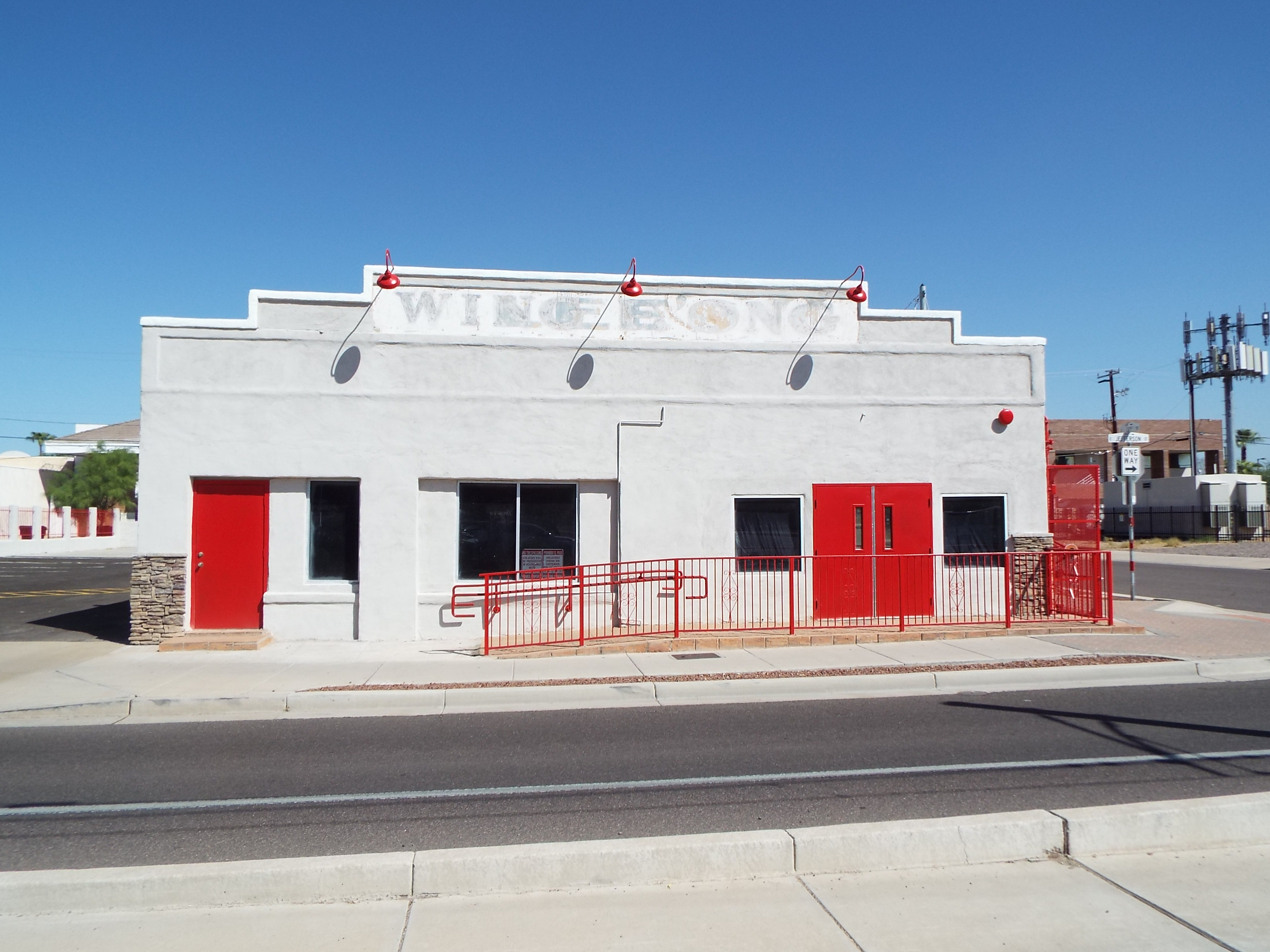
The Wing F. Ong Grocery Store located at 1246 E. Jefferson St. and built in 1925.

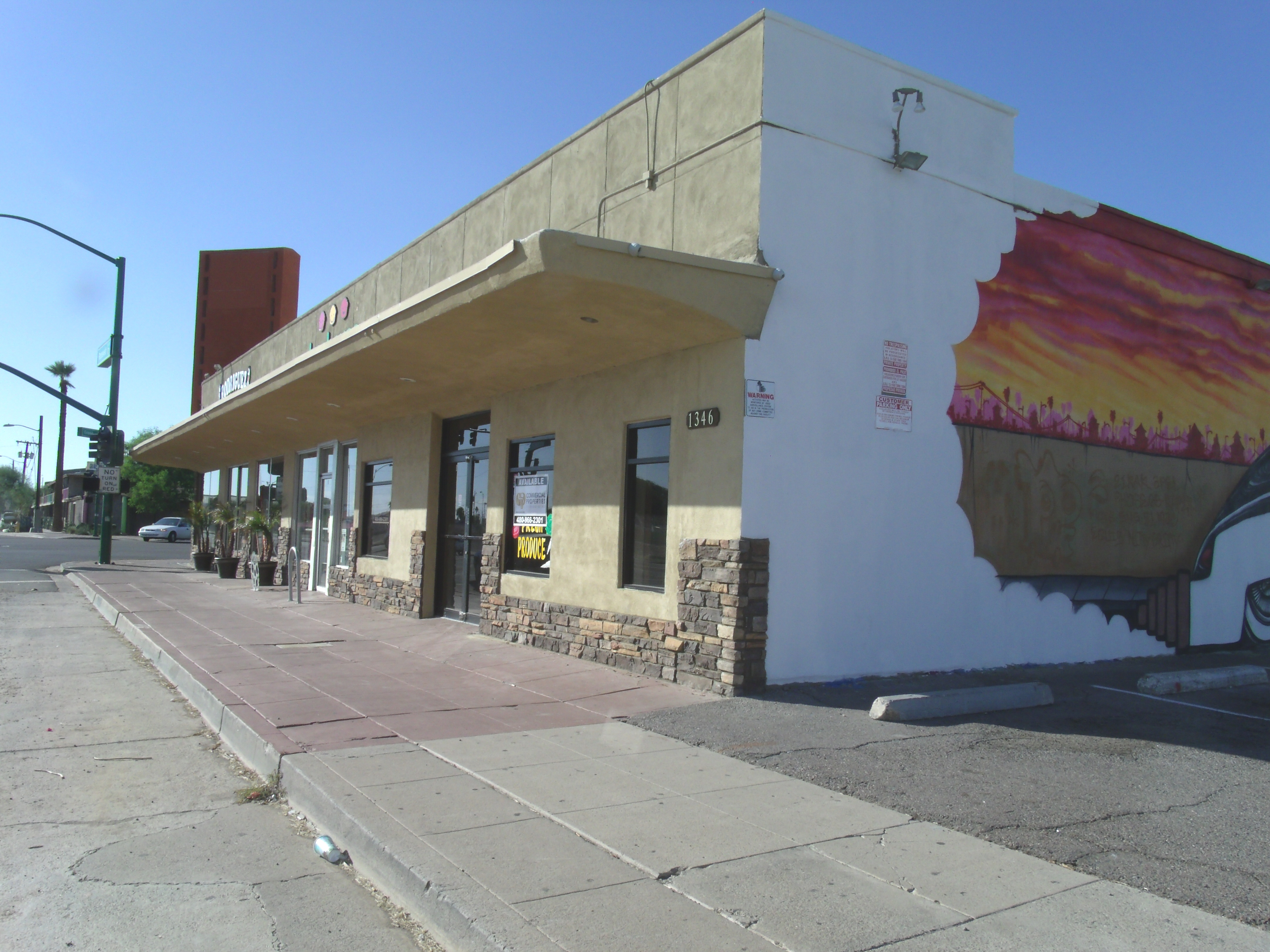
The building where Henry & Co. was once housed was built in 1928 and is located at 1346 West Roosevelt Avenue. This property is recognized as historic by the Asian American Historic Property Surve.

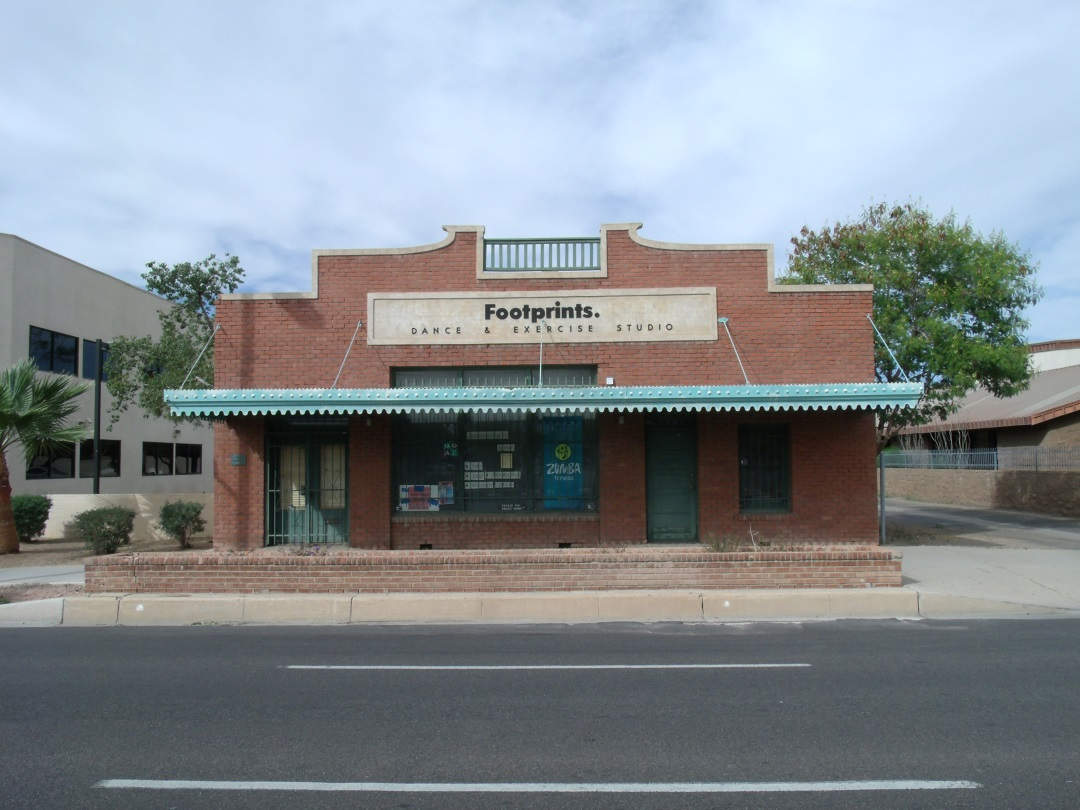
The Jim Ong's Market was built in 1928 and is located at 1110 E. Washington St. The structure, one of two built by the owner in the Chinese Community, also served as the home of the Ong family. Listed in the National Register of Historic Places. Reference number 82002084 (NRHP).

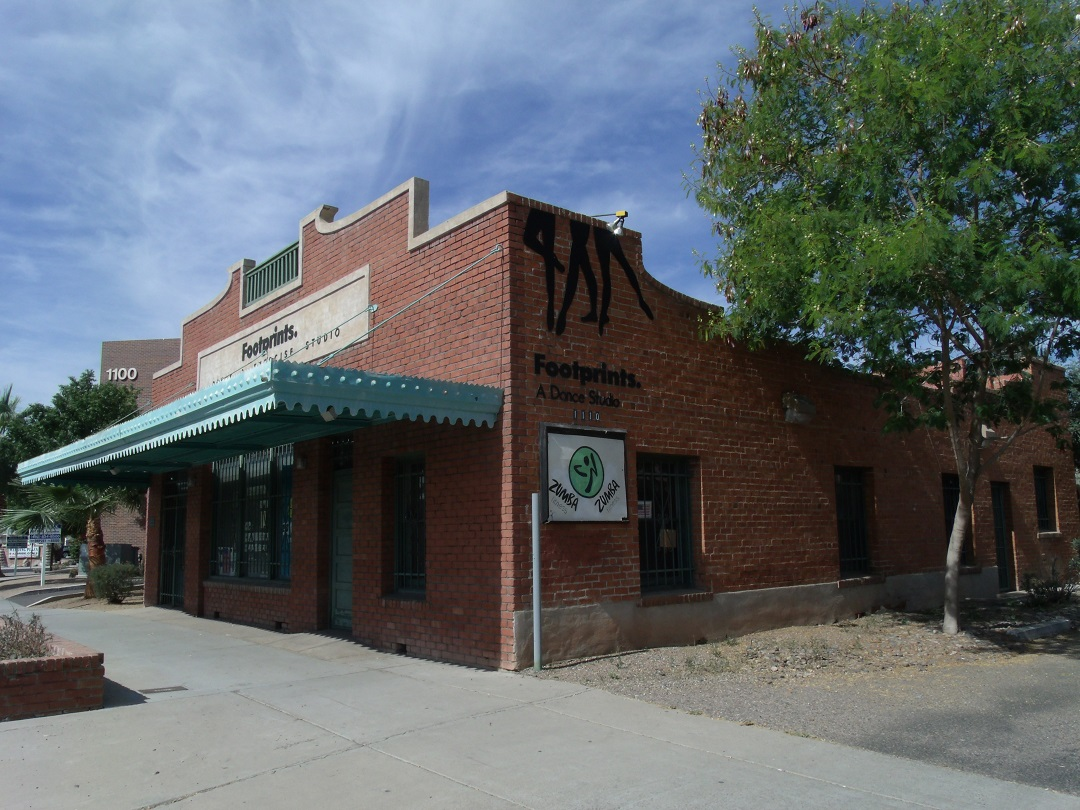
Different view of Jim Ong's Market built in 1928 and located at 1110 E. Washington St. The structure, one of two built by the owner in the Chinese Community, also served as the home of the Ong family. Listed in the National Register of Historic Places. Reference number 82002084 (NRHP).

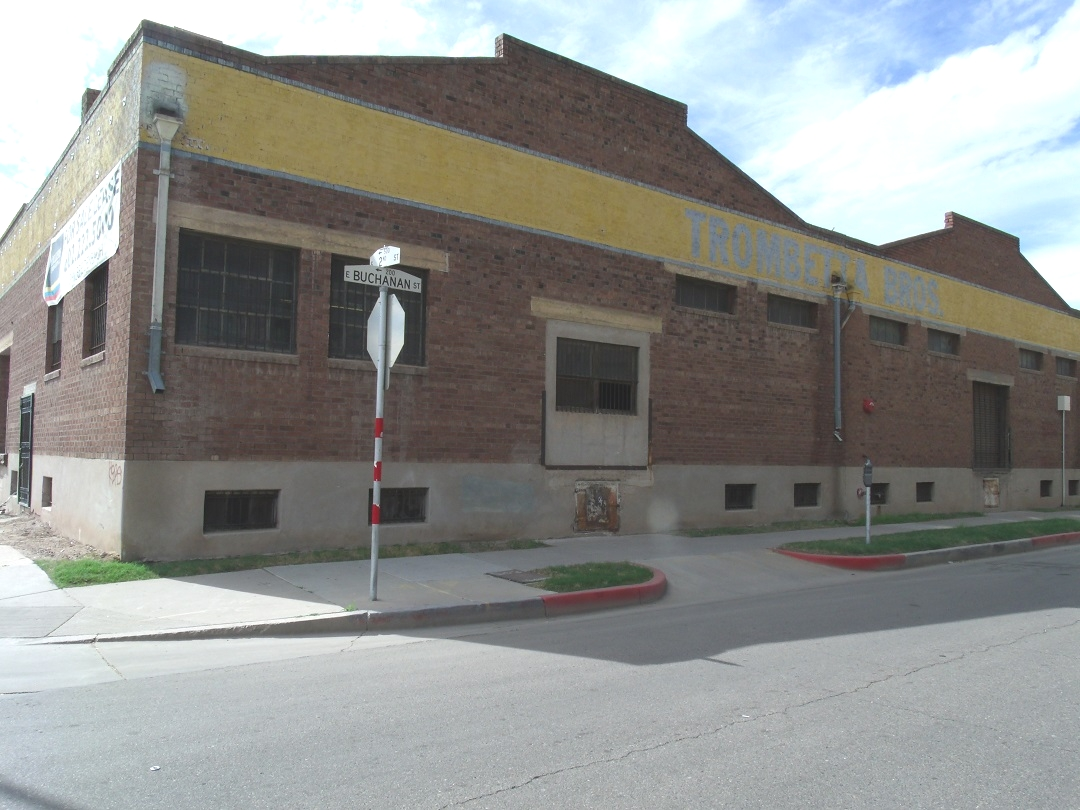
The Ong Yut Geong Market Warehouse was built in 1930 and is located at 502 S. 2nd. St. Listed in the National Register of Historic Places. Reference #86002066.

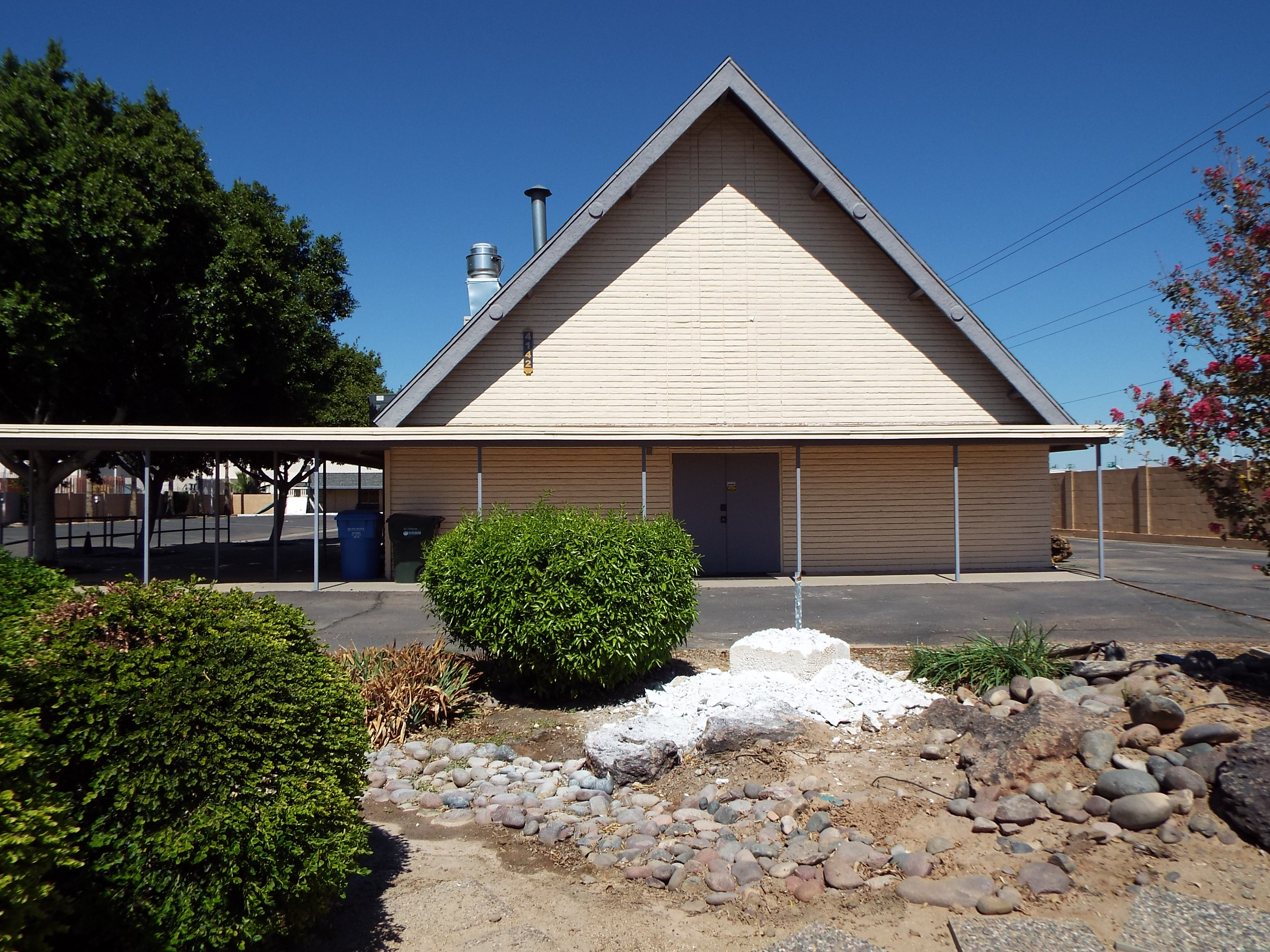
The Arizona Buddhist Church/Temple built in 1930 and located at 4142 West Clarenden Avenue was the first church if its kind in Arizona.

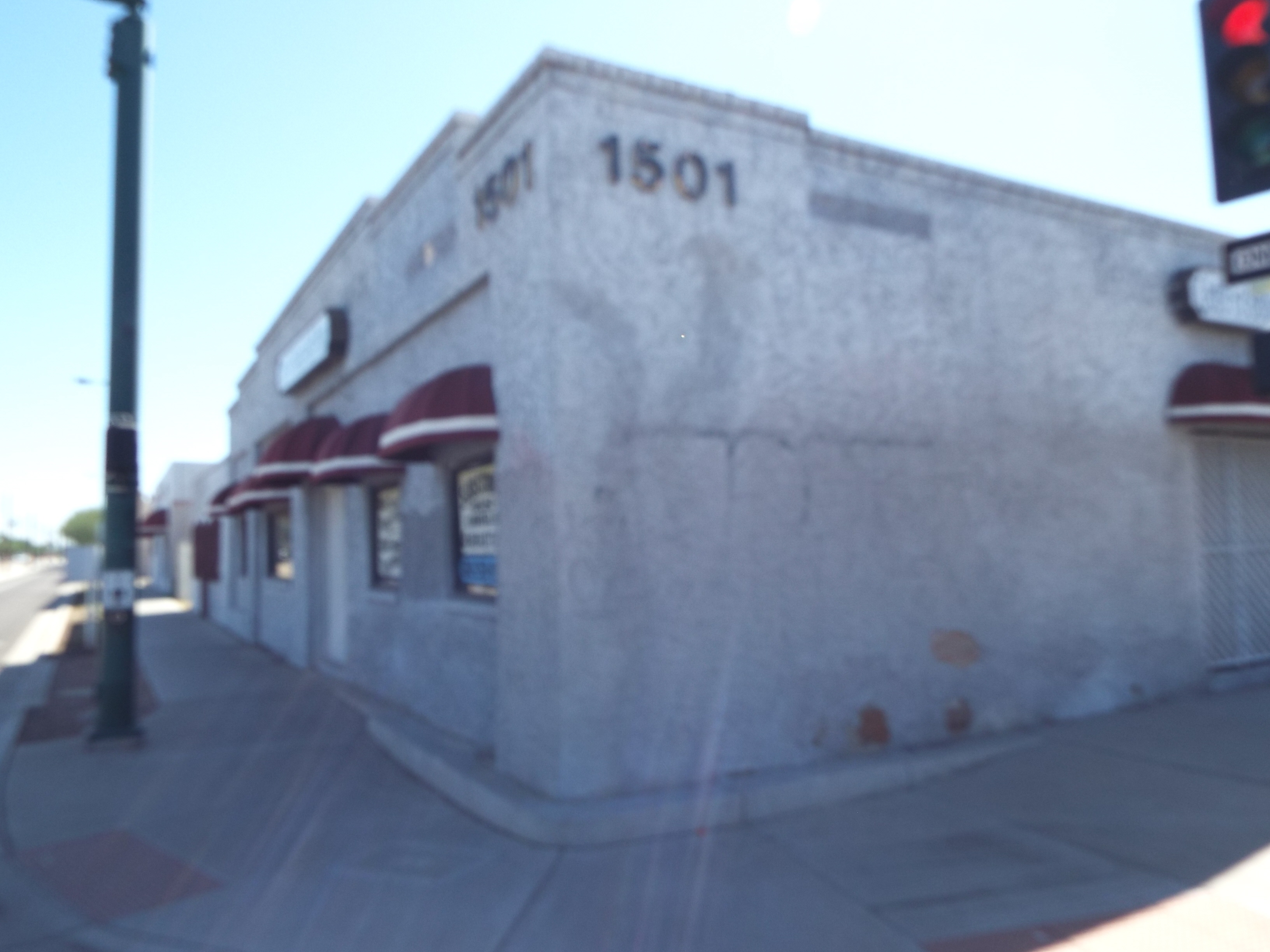
The Lee Jew Market building was built in 1931 and is located at 1501 East Washington Street. The building is listed as historical by the City of Phoenix Asian American Historic Property Survey.

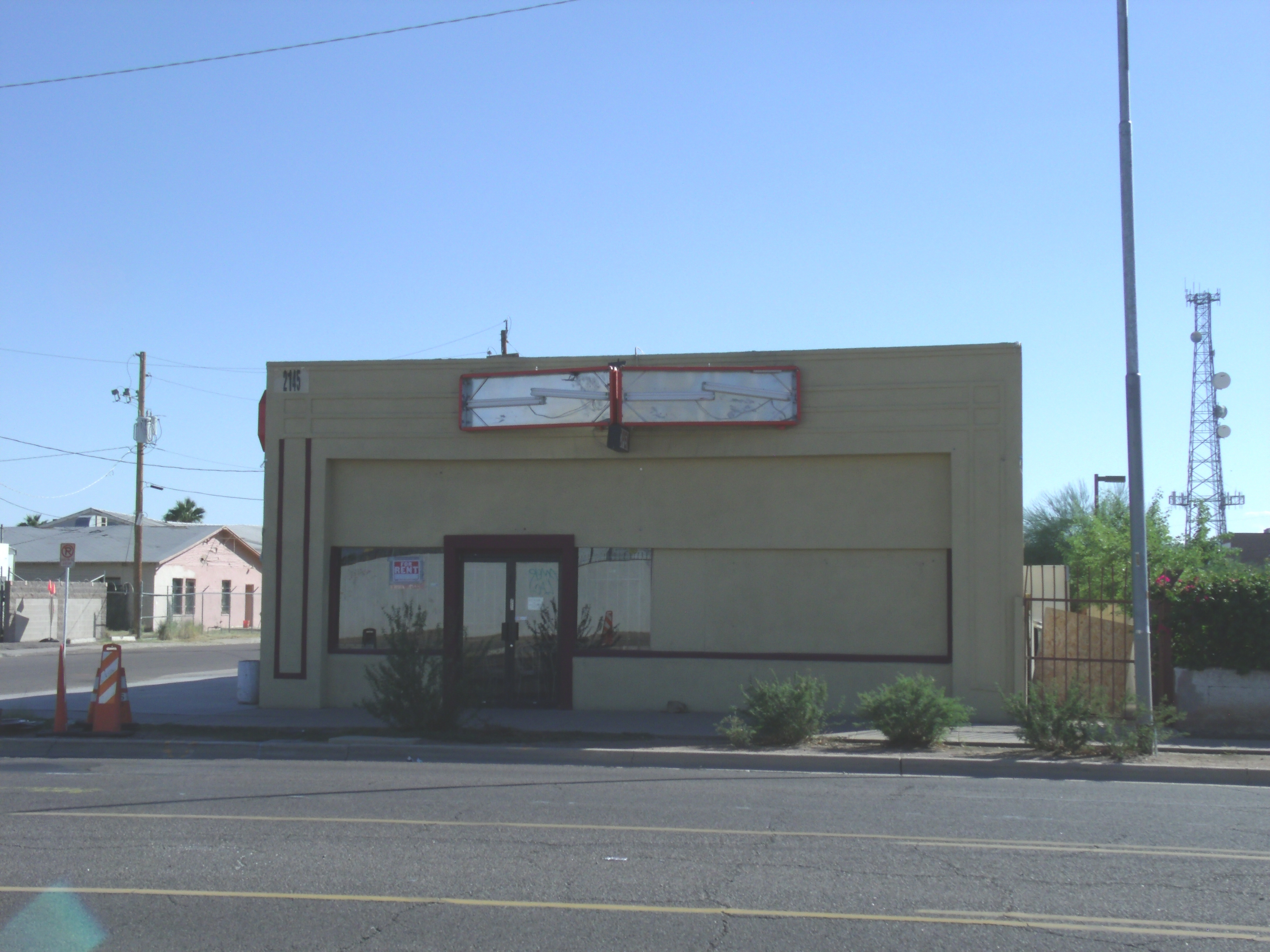
The T and T Market building was built in 1939 and is located at 2145 East Van Buren Avenue. This property is recognized as historic by the Asian American Historic Property Survey.

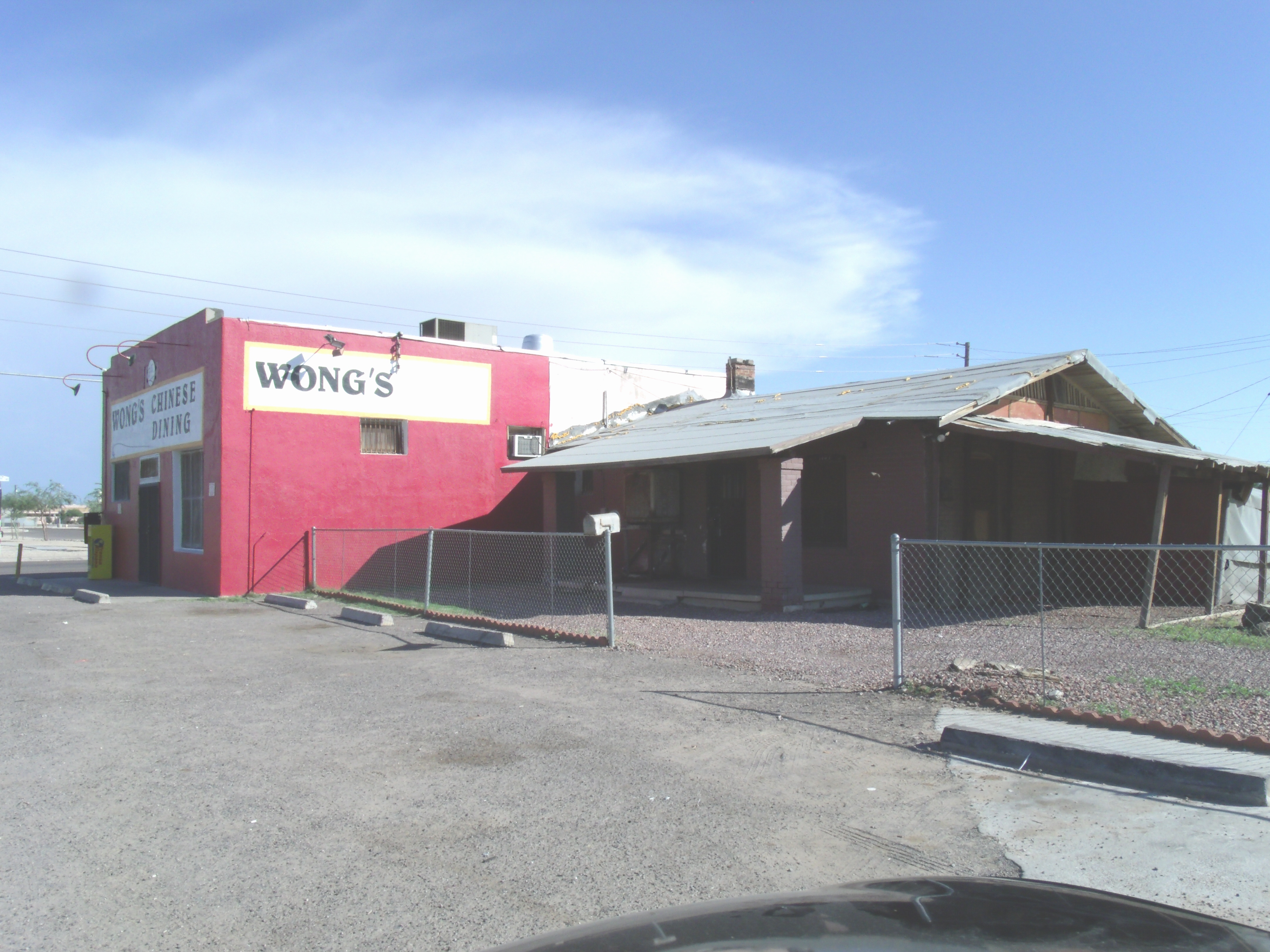
The K.L. Tang Grocery building was built in 1942 and is located at 1141 East Buckeye Road. The "Tang House" was built in the early 1900s. This property is recognized as historic by the Asian American Historic Property Survey.

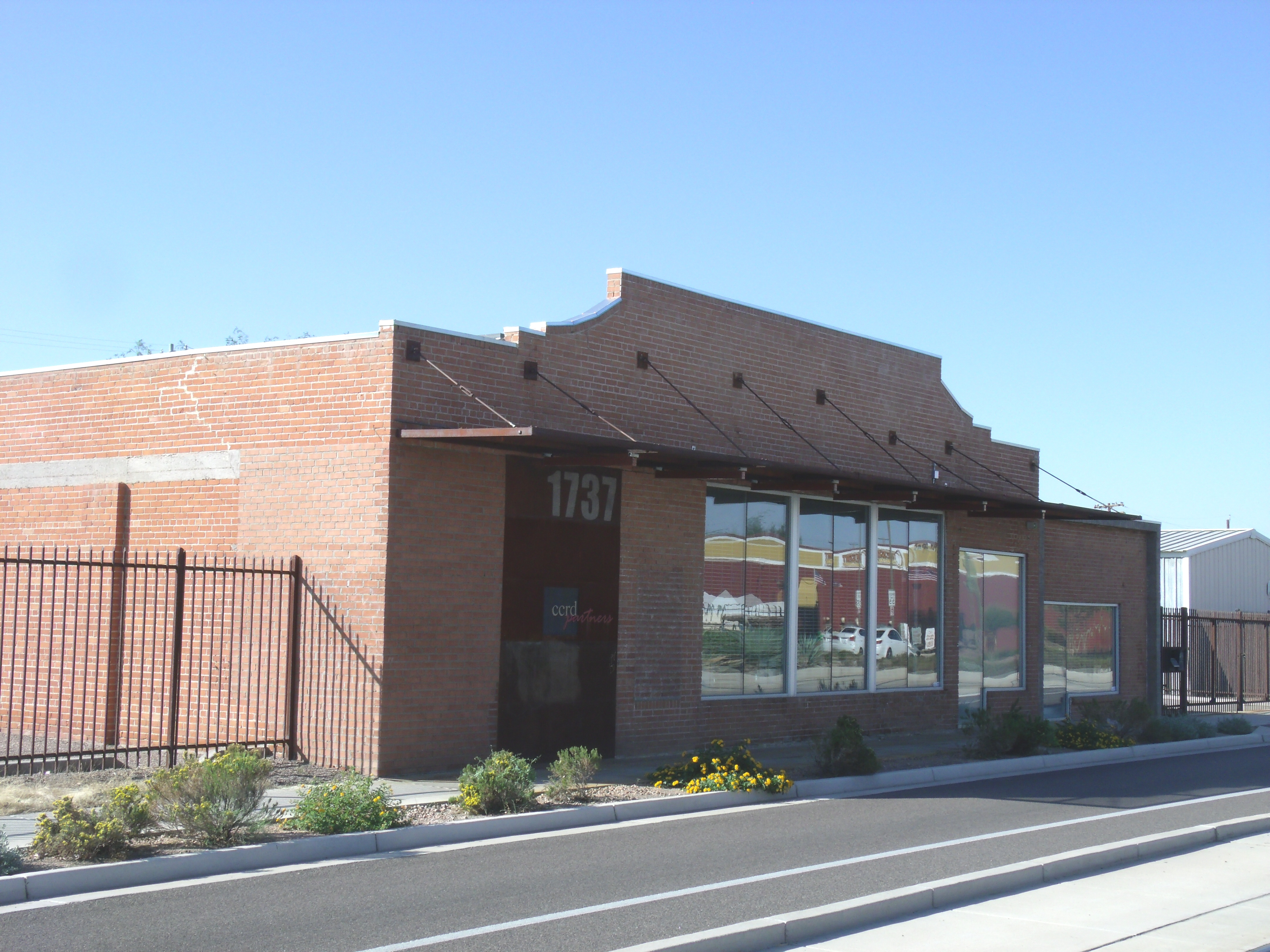
The Modern Food Market building was built in 1948 and is located at 1737 E. Washington Avenue. This property is recognized as historic by the Asian American Historic Property Survey of the City of Phoenix.

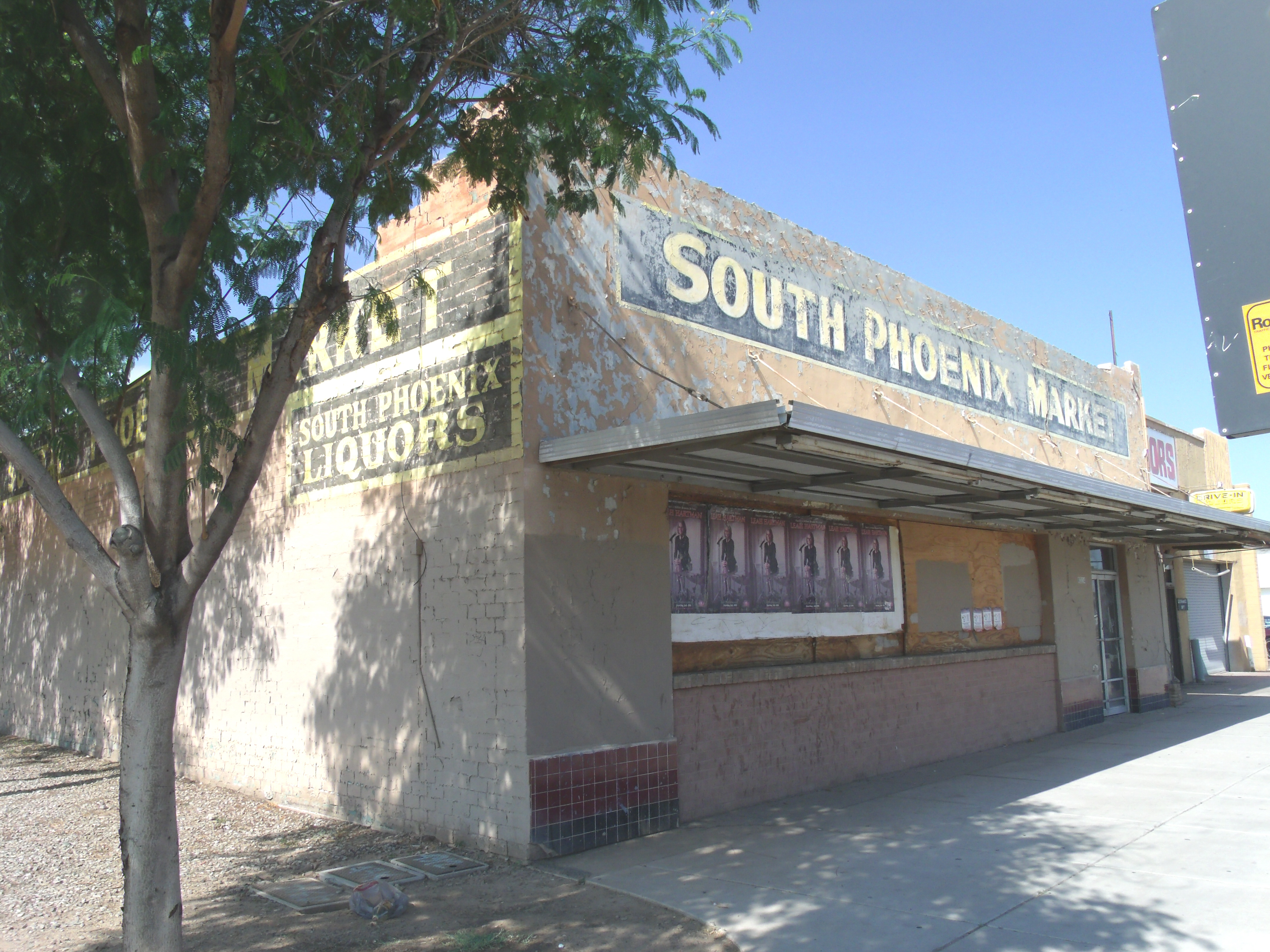
The South Phoenix Market building was built in 1948 and is located at 4341 S. Central Avenue. This property is recognized as historic by the Asian American Historic Property Survey of the City of Phoenix.

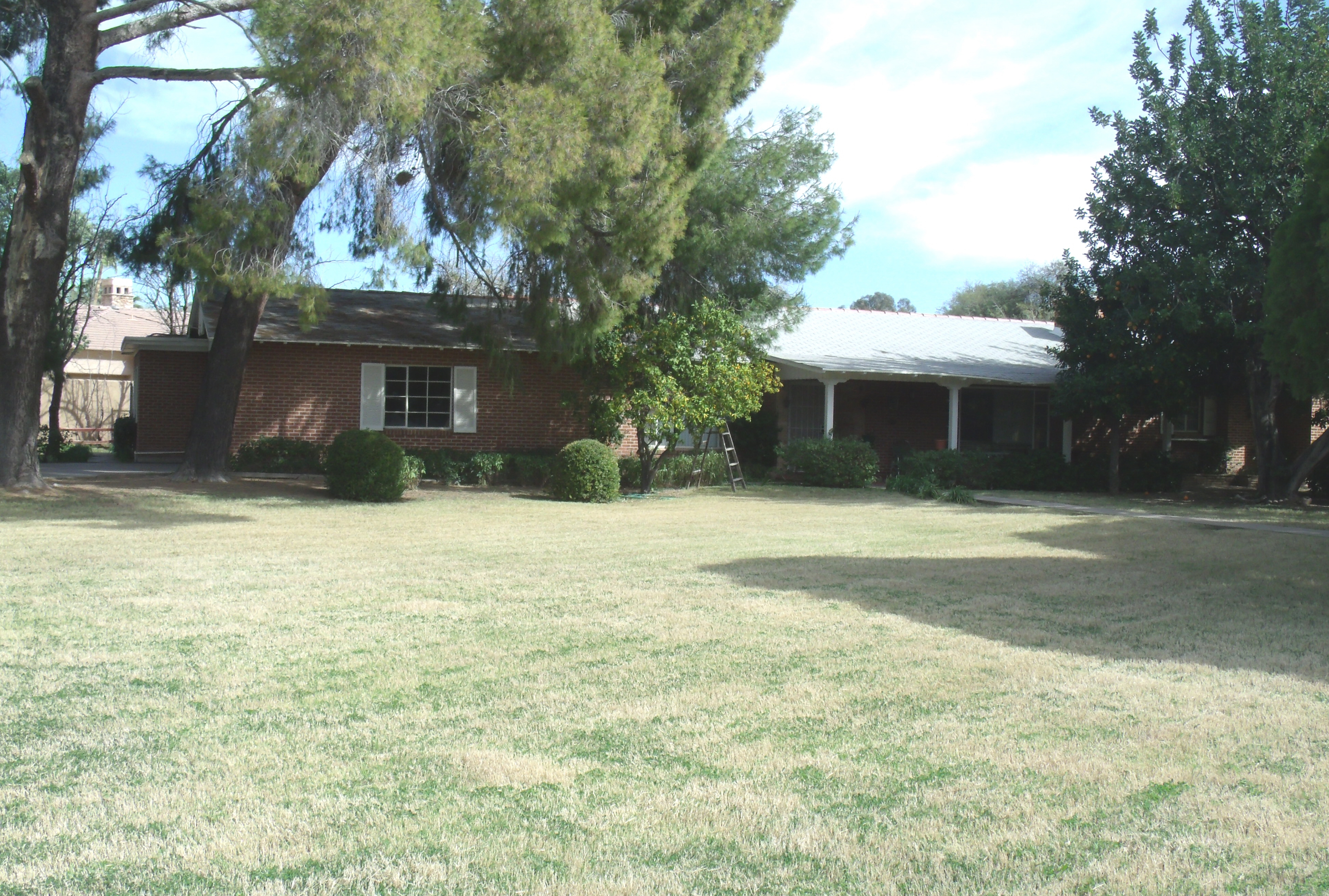
The Dea Hong Toy House was built in 1954 and is located at 2222 East Pasadena Avenue. Toy was born in China and moved to Phoenix in 1923. He was a successful merchant. Toy was among those in the Asian community of Phoenix who in 1938 founded the Chinese Chamber of Commerce to protect and promote their businesses. This property is recognized as historic by the Asian American Historic Property Survey.
Hispanic/Latin-Americans
- Vincente Canalez – In 1945 Canalez was selected to serve as Maricopa County chairman to fight infantile paralysis, and served on the City of Phoenix's planning commission in the 1950s. He moved to the Arizona town of Buckeye in 1957, and served as mayor of Buckeye in 1960.
- Valdemar Aguirre Cordova – Cordova served as the first Mexican American Maricopa County Superior Court judge, from 1965 to 1967, and then appointed to a second term in 1976 by Governor Raul Castro.
- Jesus Franco – The Spanish-language newspaper, El Sol, emerged in 1938 under the leadership of Jesús Franco, who became a very well-known individual in the Mexican community.
- Albert and Mary Garcia – Albert Garcia was Arizona's first Hispanic Assistant Attorney General. María García was an activist for social issues.
- Placida Garcia Smith – Placida Garcia Smith founded the "Friendly House" in the mid-1920s as a two-room "community house" where classes in English, citizenship, hygiene and homemaking were taught to Mexican residents.
- Rudolf Zepeda – Zepeda was the first Hispanic official at Valley National Bank in the 1950s, serving as the vice-president for foreign trade.
- Adam Perez Diaz – In 1954, Diaz became the first Hispanic elected to the Phoenix City Council and also served as Vice-Mayor. President Bill Clinton appointed Diaz to the National Council on Aging
Historic Hispanic-American Properties
(including buildings, schools, churches and homes)
National Register of Historic Places=(NRHP)
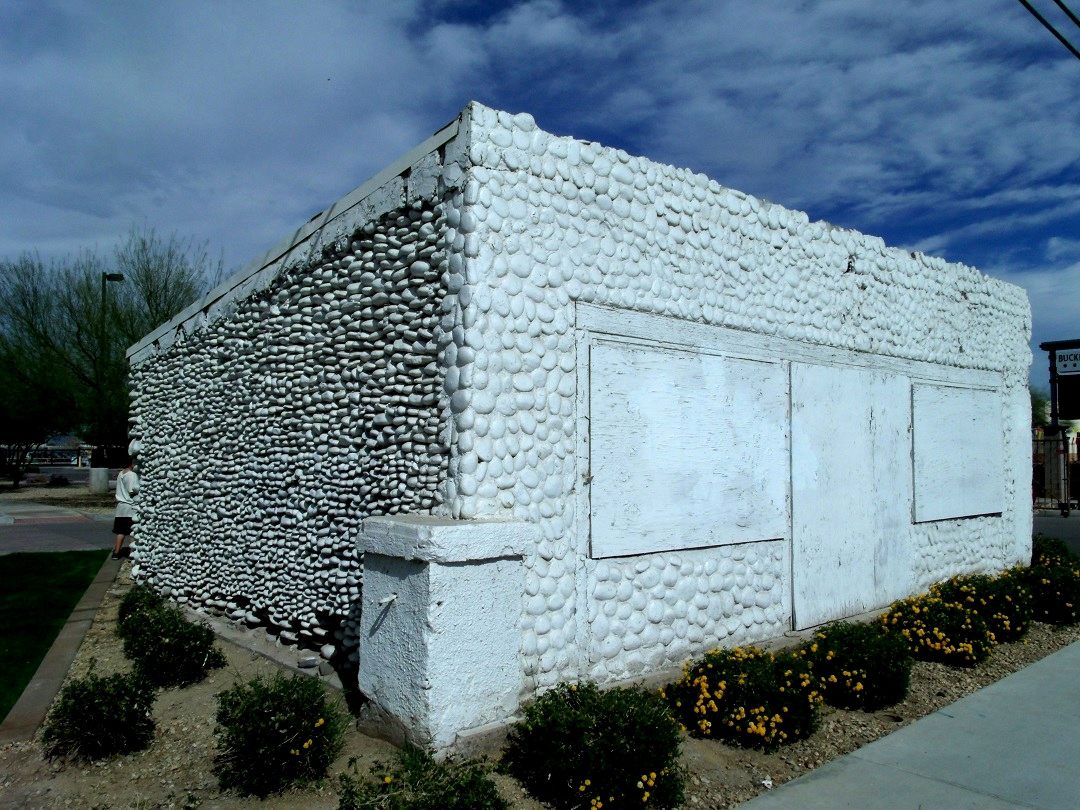
The Jones-Montoya House, located at 1008 E. Buckeye Road, was built in 1879 and is one of Phoenix's oldest houses. It is listed in the Phoenix Historic Property Register.

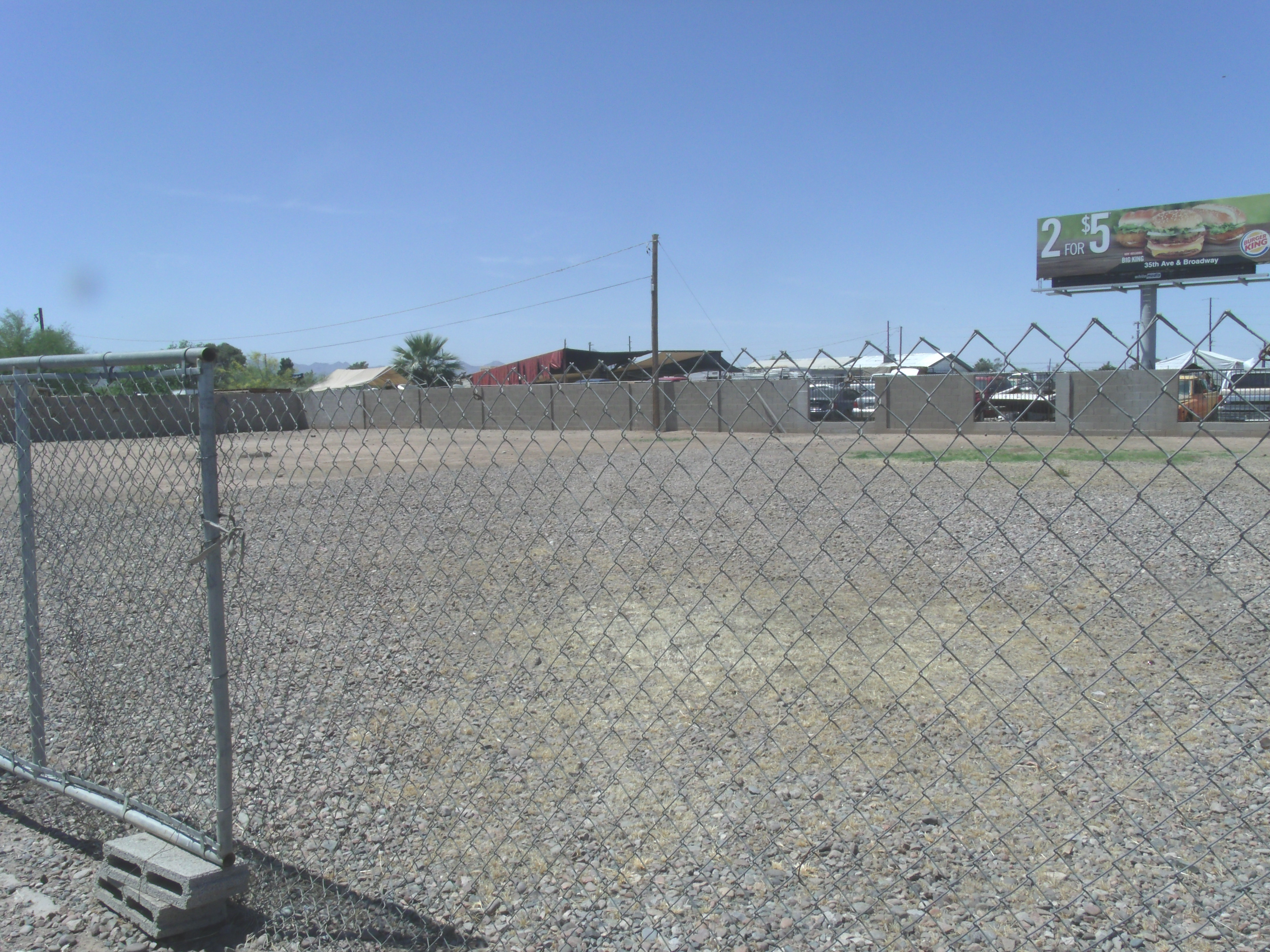
The Sotelo-Heard Cemetery was established in 1896 and is located at 1127 W Broadway Road. This is on the southeast intersection of 12th Avenue and Broadway Road. Hundreds of Mexican laborers and their children were buried near 12th Avenue and Broadway Road from the late 1880s to the 1920s. The cemetery received heavy use between 1896 and 1922 in a community where a majority of the residents were of Mexican descent and settled, farmed, or dug irrigation canals in the Lower Salt River Valley. Many were laborers on the Bartlett-Heard Ranch or other Anglo-owned ranches in the area. The cemetery was listed in the Phoenix Historic Property Register in October 2007. Throughout the years, grave robbers and kids trampled on the headstones and destroyed them. The site is in complete state of abandonment.

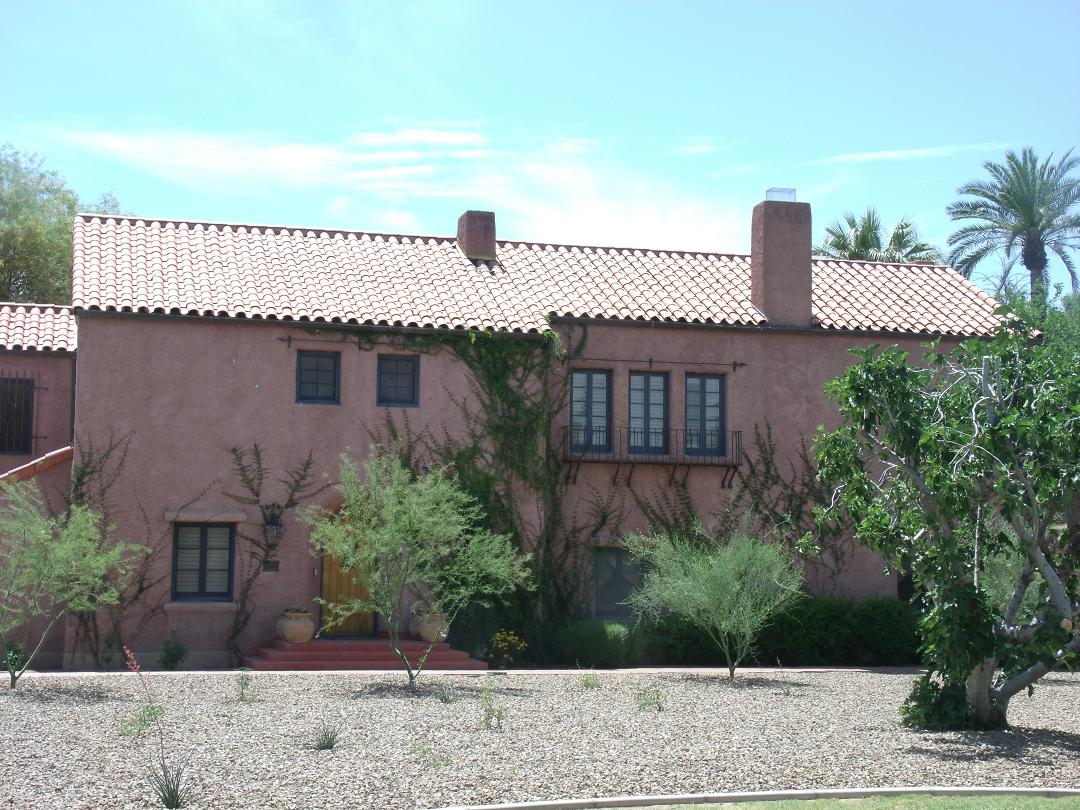
The Rancho Joaquina House was built in 1900 and is located at 4630 E. Cheery Lynn Rd. Listed in the National Register of Historic Places in 1984. Reference number 84000786.

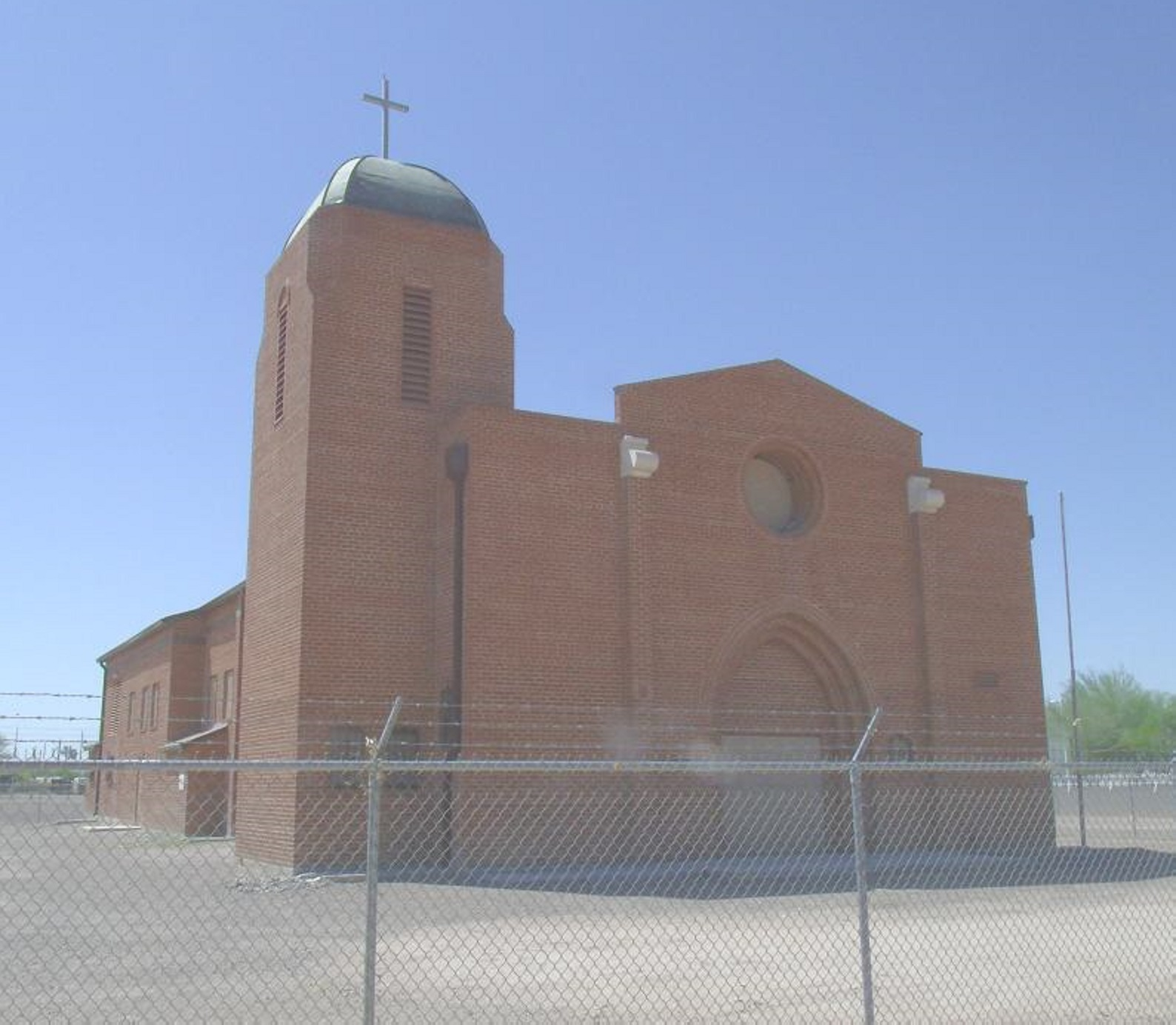
The Sacred Heart Church built in 1900, is located in 920 S. 17th St. It was added to National Register of Historic Places on March 20, 2012. Reference number 12000124.

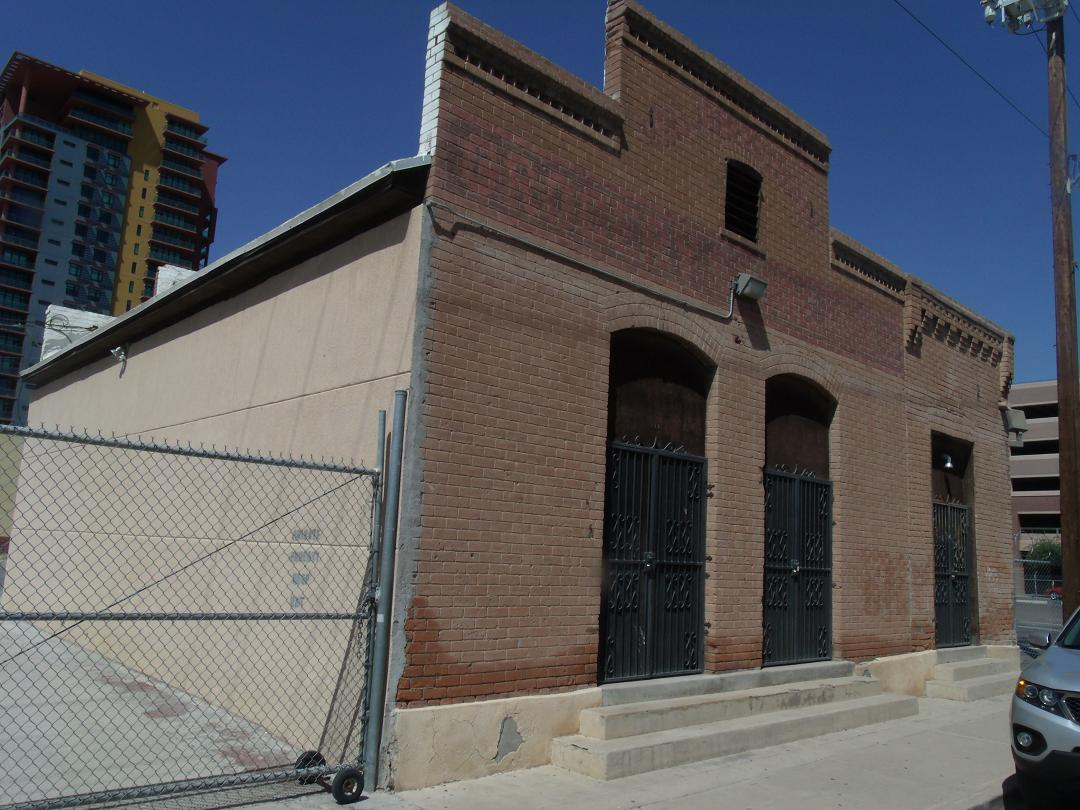
The Arvizu's El Fresnal Grocery Store, also known as 25-23 was built in 1900 and is located at 310 E. Buchanan. It was added to the National Register of Historic Places in 1985. Reference number 85002046.

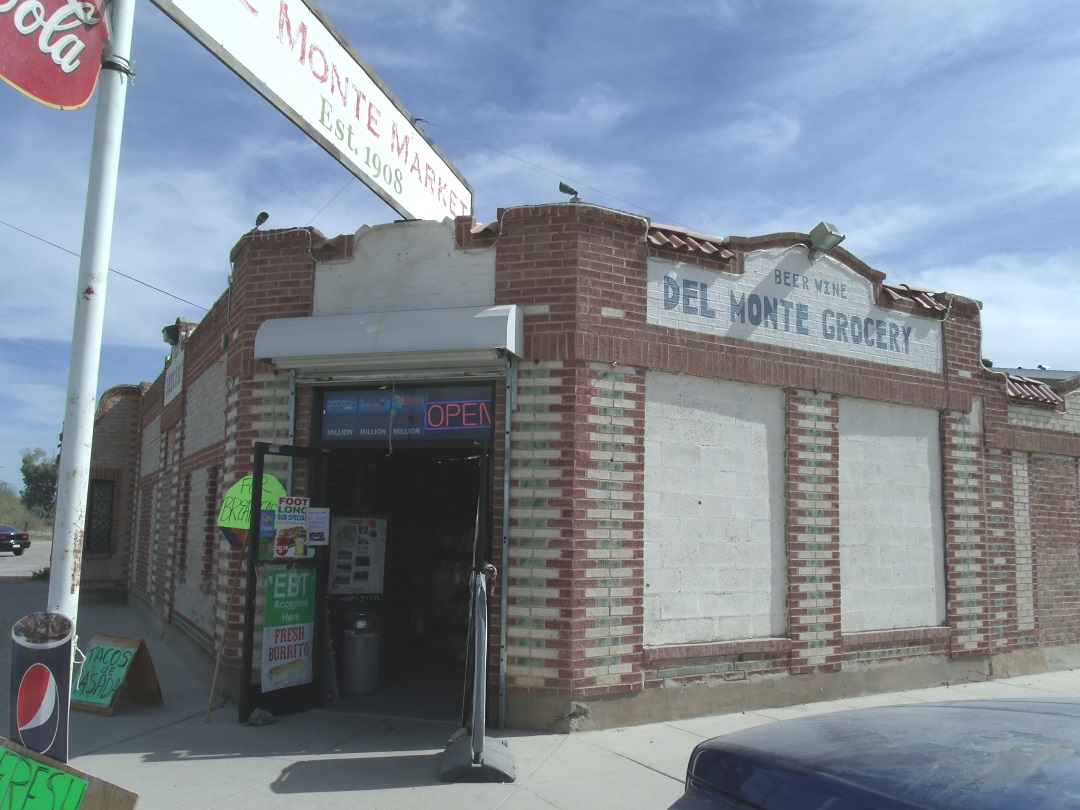
The Del Monte Market was built in 1908 and is located at 2659 W. Dobbins Road. It is the oldest continuously operating market in the state. Designated as a landmark with Historic Preservation-Landmark (HP-L) overlay zoning. Listed in the Phoenix Historic Property Register.

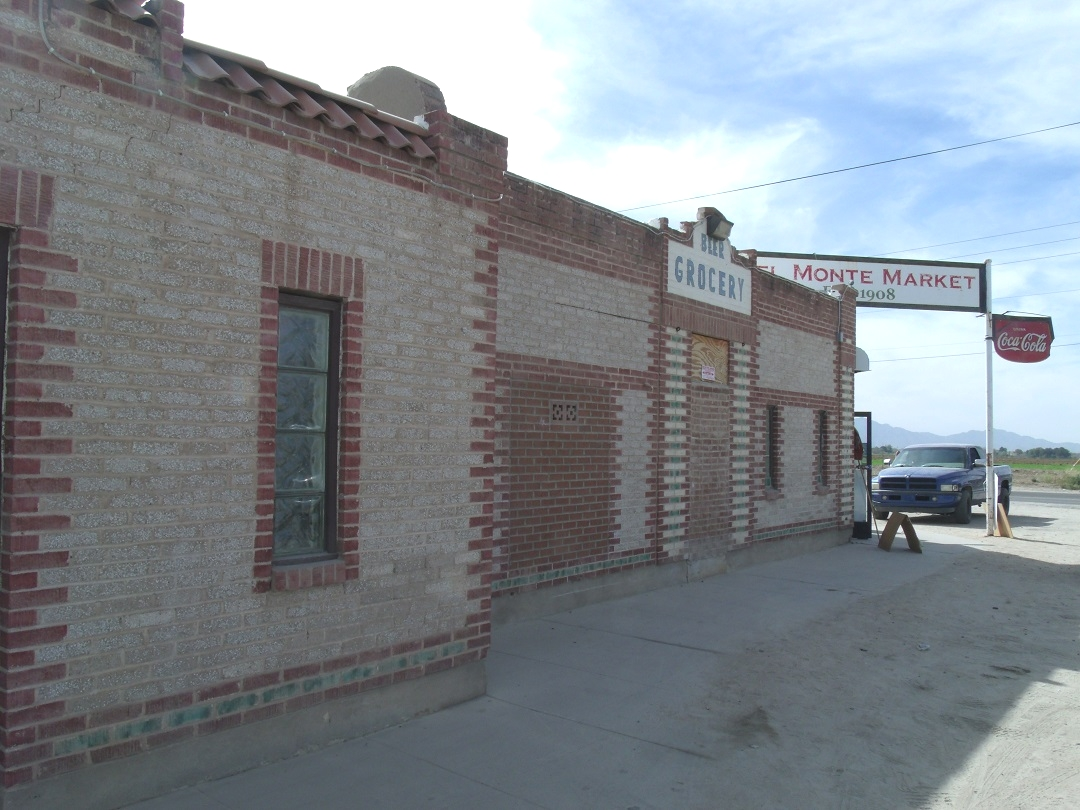
Different view of Del Monte Market built in 1908 and located at 2659 W. Dobbins Road. It is the oldest continuously operating market in the state. Designated as a landmark with Historic Preservation-Landmark (HP-L) overlay zoning. It was listed in the Phoenix Historic Property Register.

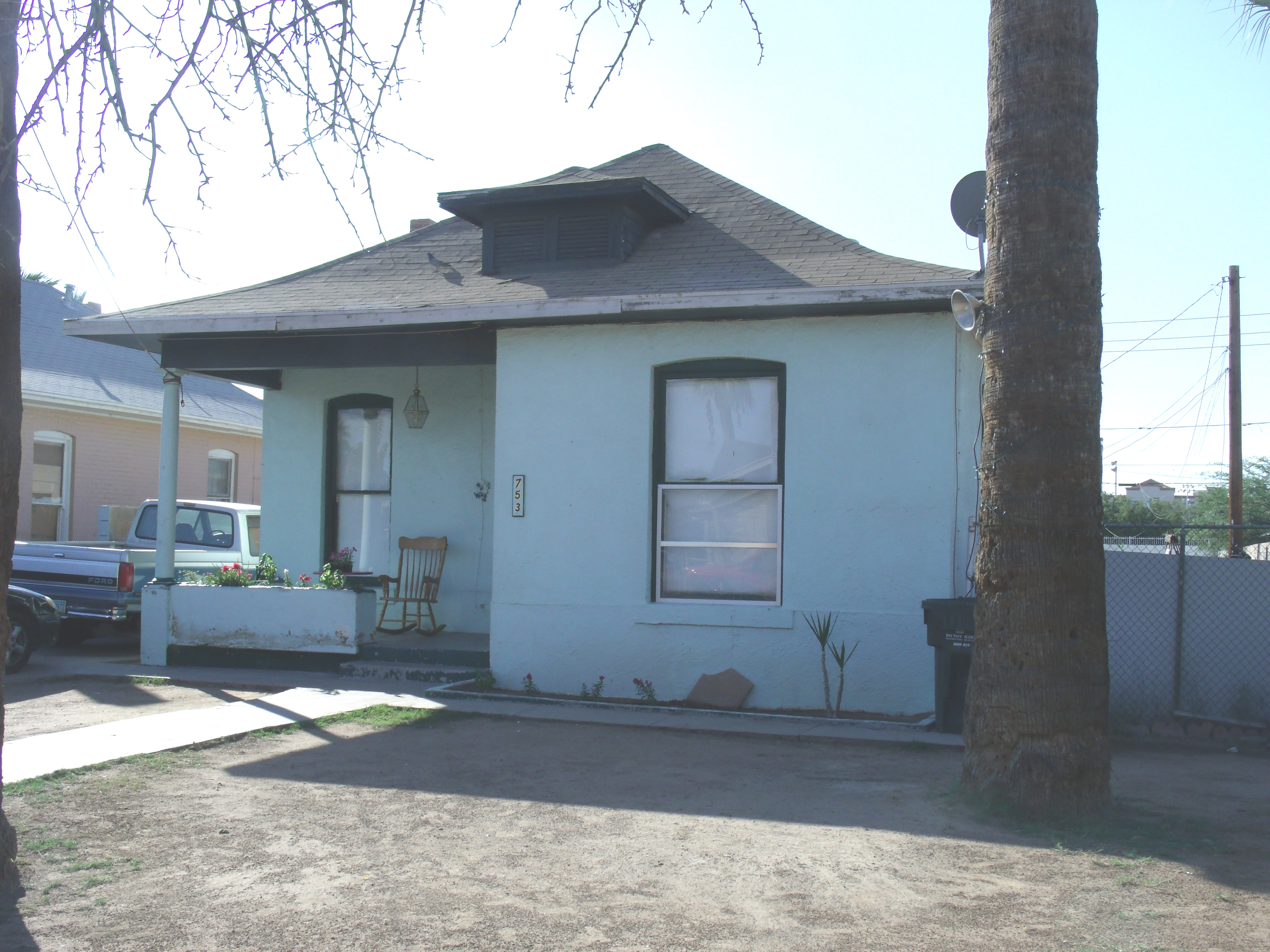
The Pete Romo House was built in 1913 and is located at 753 E. Pierce St. Pete Romo owned a butcher shop on Washington Street, near the Ramona Theater in the 1920s. This property is recognized as historic by the Hispanic American Historic Property Survey of the City of Phoenix. The house is part of the Garfield Historic District which is listed in the National Register of Historic Places, reference number: #10000325.

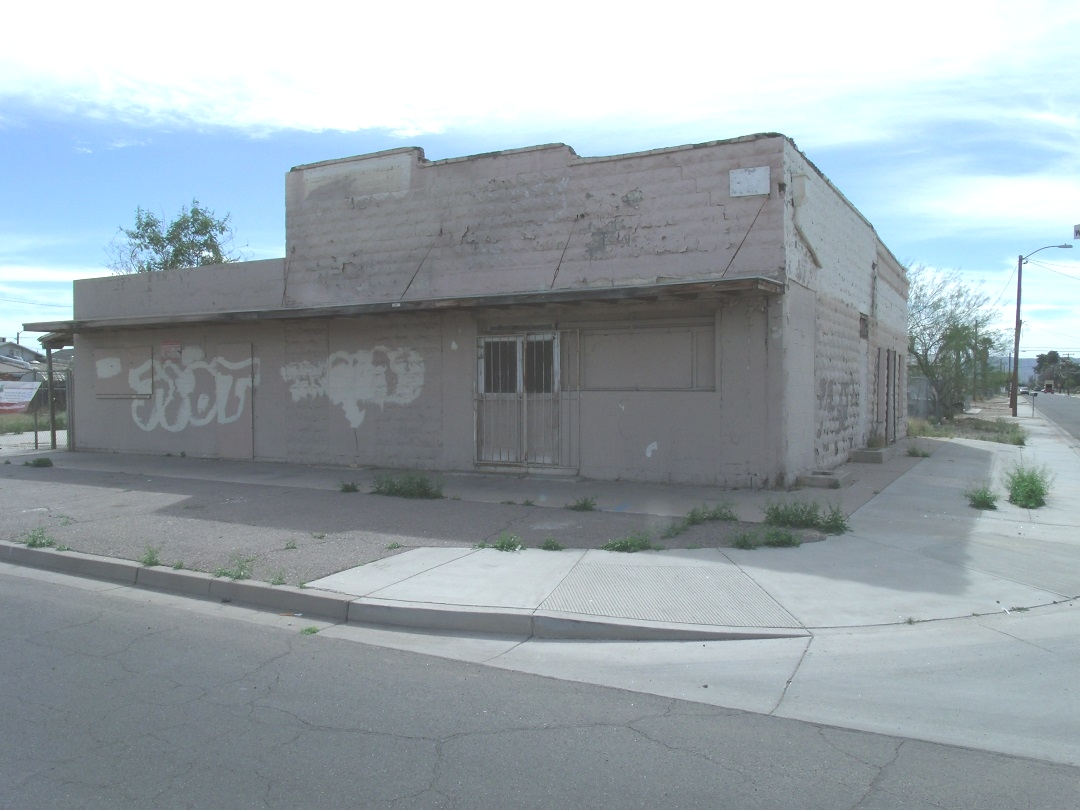
The Luis Lugo Bakery "La Patellera" was built in 1917 and is located at 415 W. Sherman St. This structure is one of the earliest Hispanic commercial properties in Phoenix. Designated as a landmark with Historic Preservation-Landmark (HP-L) overlay zoning. It is listed in the Phoenix Historic Property Register.

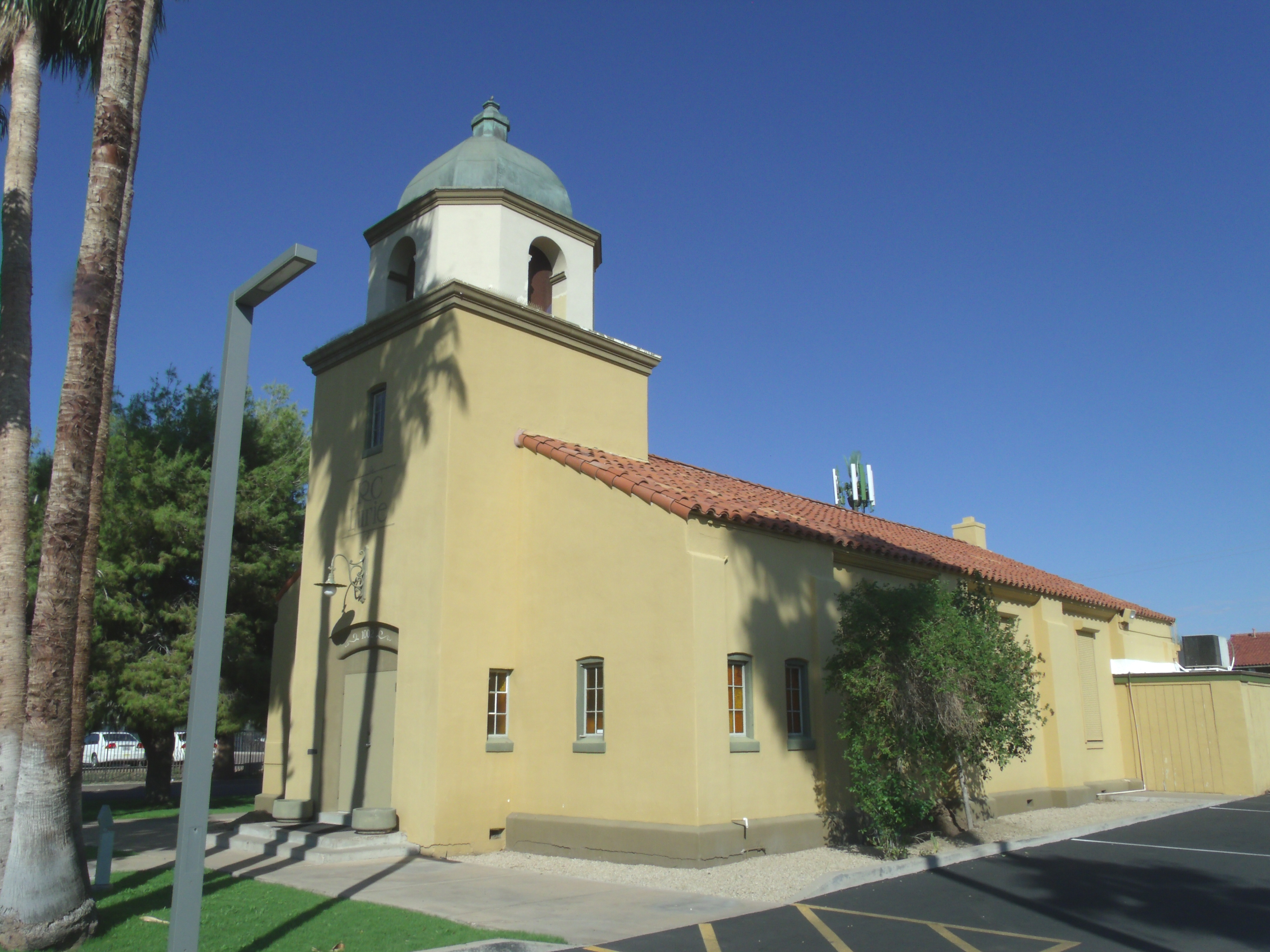
The First Mexican Baptist Church was built in 1920 and is located at 1002 E. Jefferson Avenue. This property is recognized as historic by the Hispanic American Historic Property Survey of the City of Phoenix.

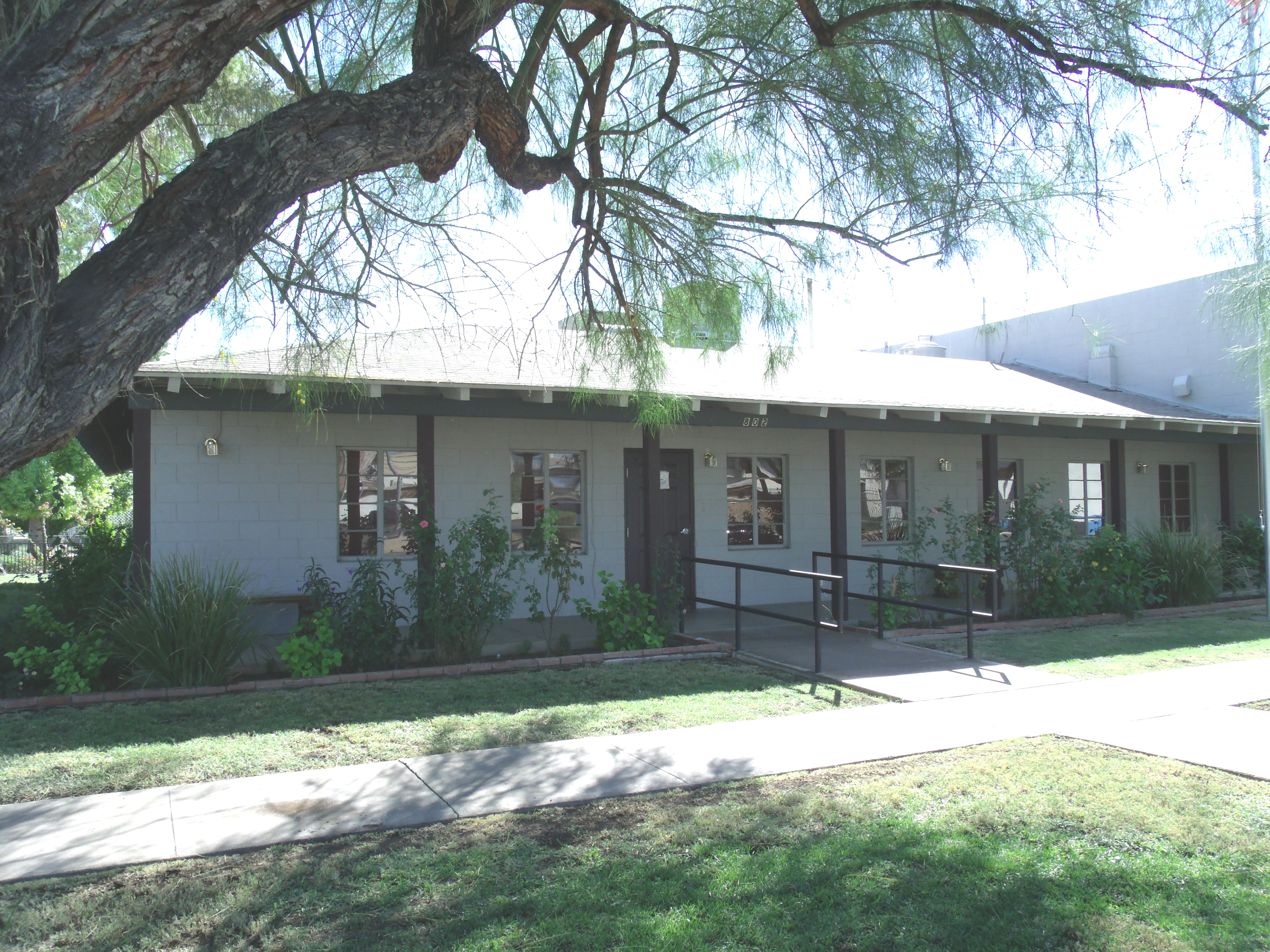
The Friendly House structure was built in 1900 and is located at 802 South 1st. Avenue. The Friendly House was established in 1922 by the Phoenix Americanization Committee presided by Placida Garcia Smith with the help of Mary Garcia to assist immigrants in transitioning their lives to Arizona. This property is recognized as historic by the Hispanic American Historic Property Survey.

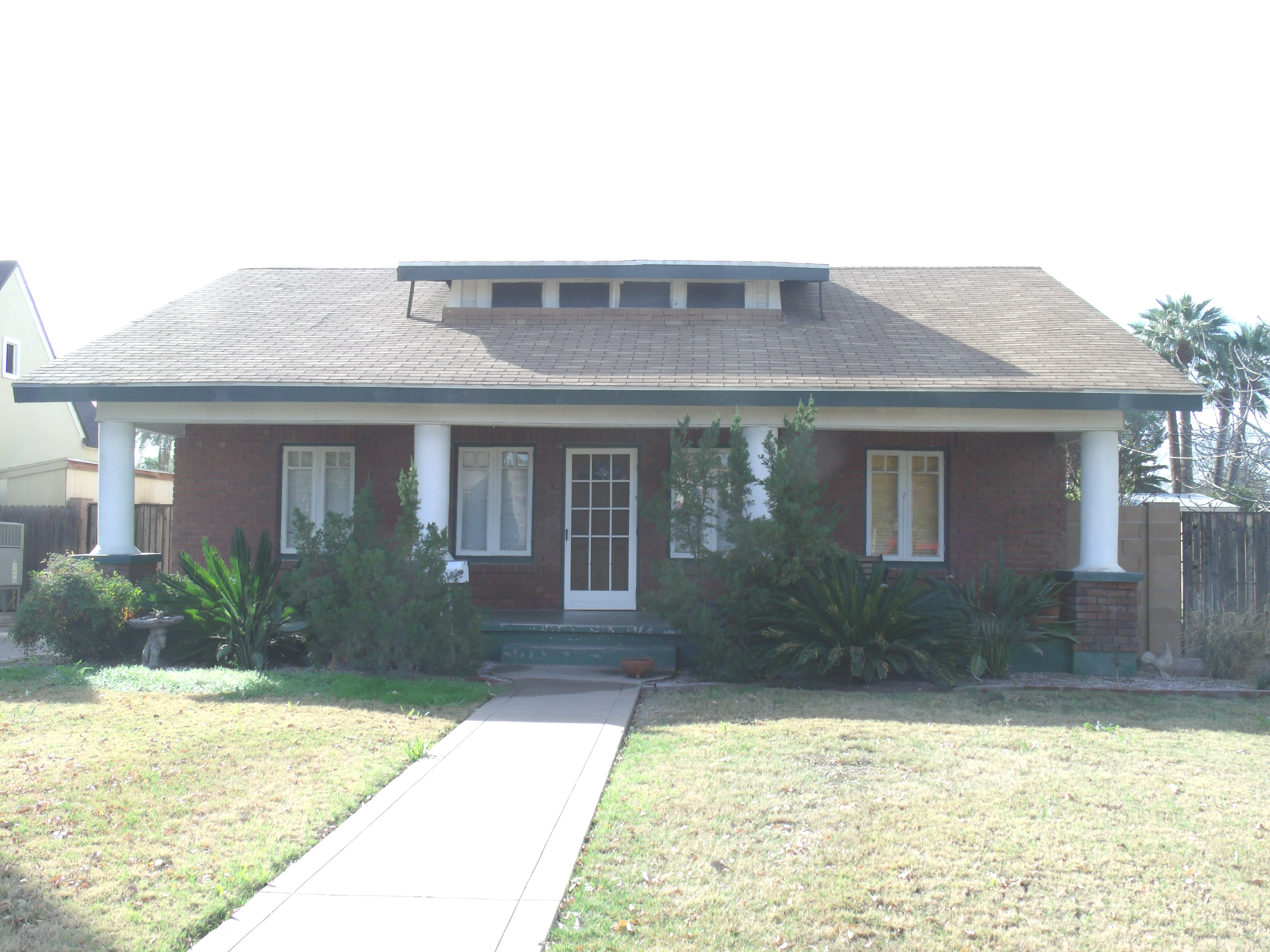
The Placida Garcia Smith House was built in 1925 and is located at 111 W. Granada Rd. Placida Garcia Smith founded the "Friendly House", located at 802 S. 1st. Avenue, in the mid-1920s as a two-room "community house" where classes in English, citizenship, hygiene and homemaking were taught to Mexican residents. This property is recognized as historic by the Hispanic American Historic Property Survey. It is located in the Willo Historic District which was listed in the National Register of Historic Places on January 9, 1991, ref.: 90002099.

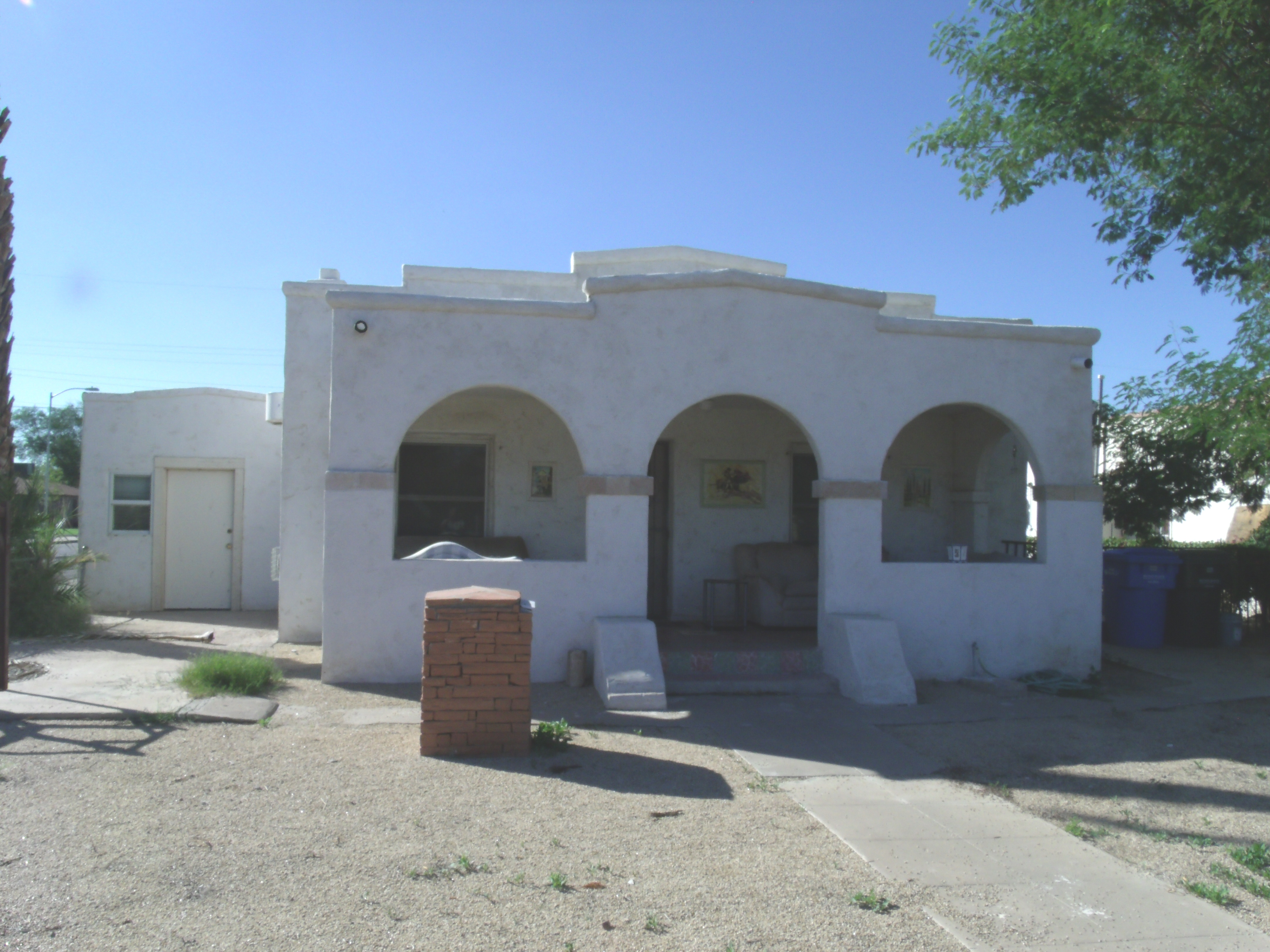
The John and Enriqueta House built in 1926 and located at 1322 S. 1st. Avenue. This property is recognized as historic by the Hispanic American Historic Property Survey.

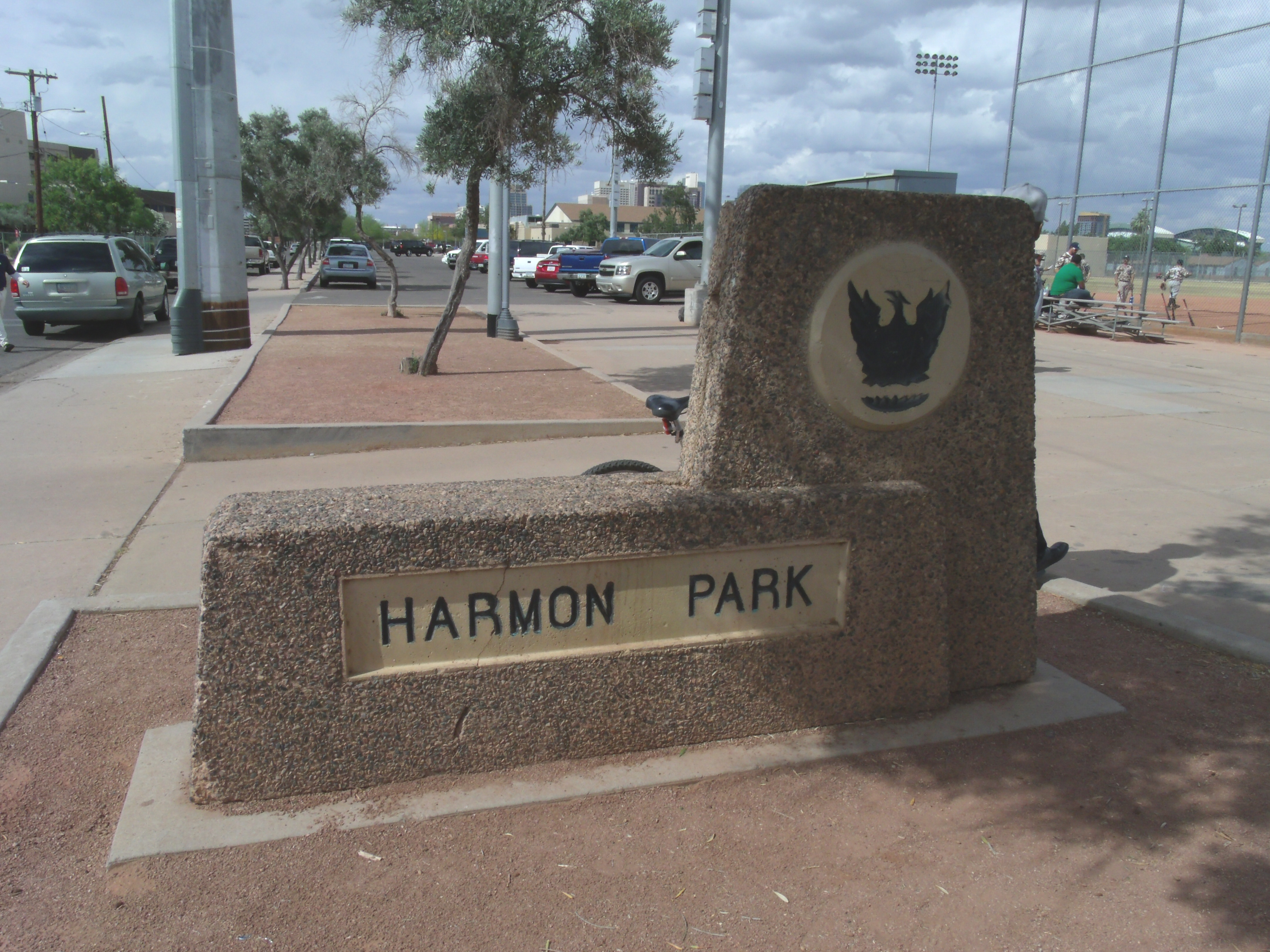
Harmon Park was built in 1927 and is located at 1425 S. 5th Avenue. It was listed in the Phoenix Historic Register in October 2007.

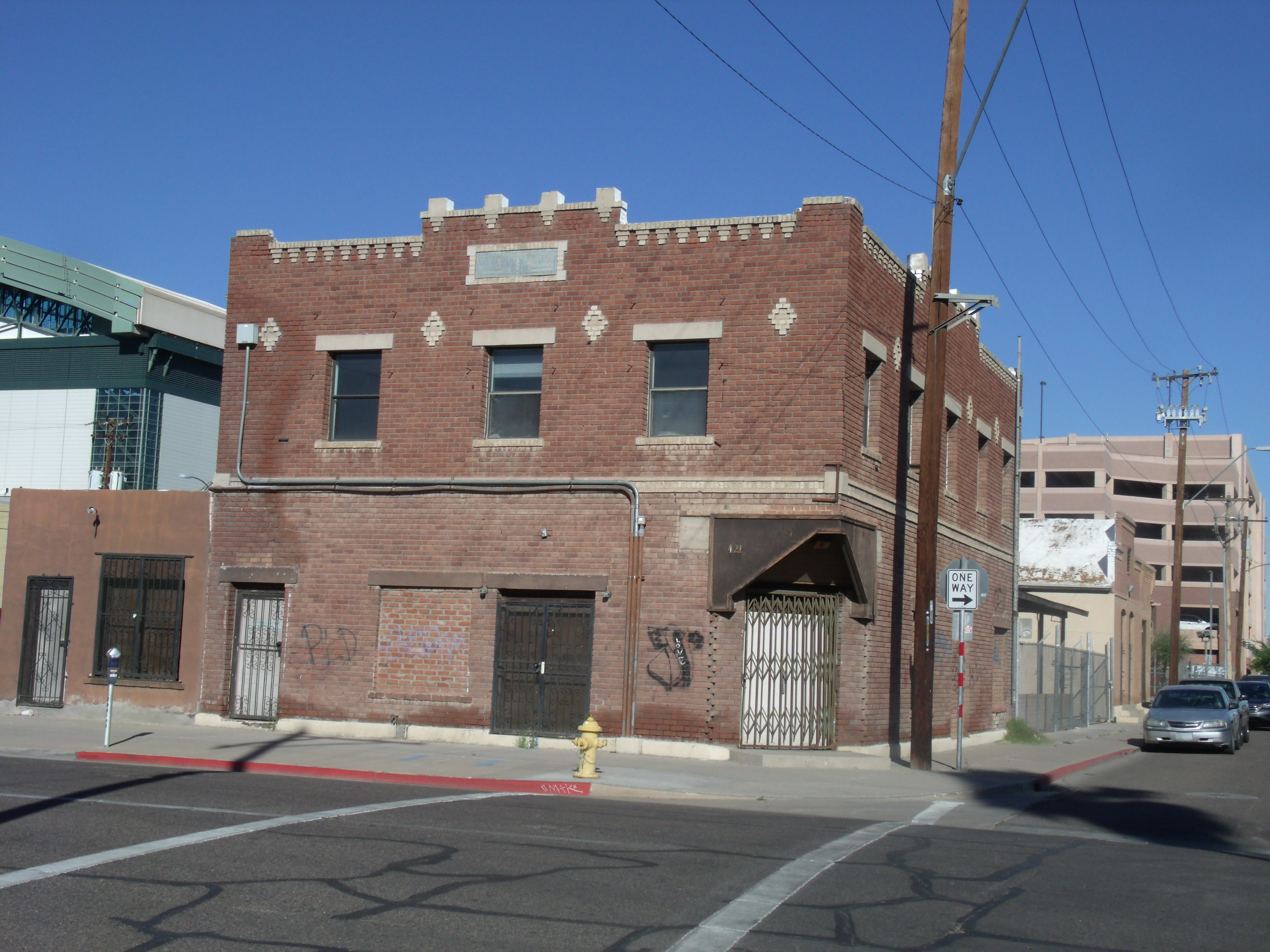
Gerardo's Building built in 1928 and located at 421 S. Third St. It once housed a café on the first floor and residential rentals on the upper level. Listed in the National Register of Historic Places. Reference number 85002057.

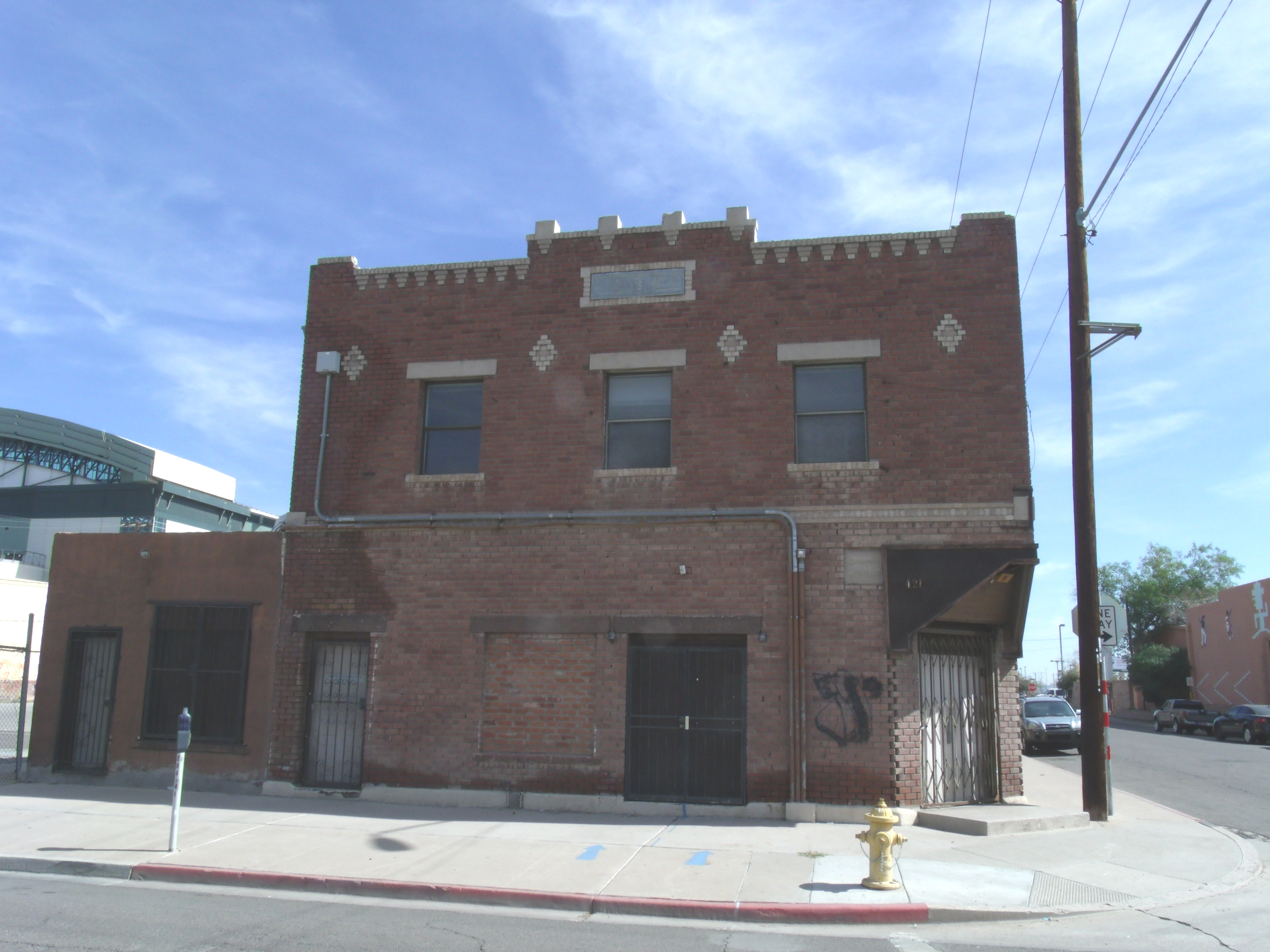
Different view of Gerardo's Building. Listed in the National Register of Historic Places, reference number 85002057.

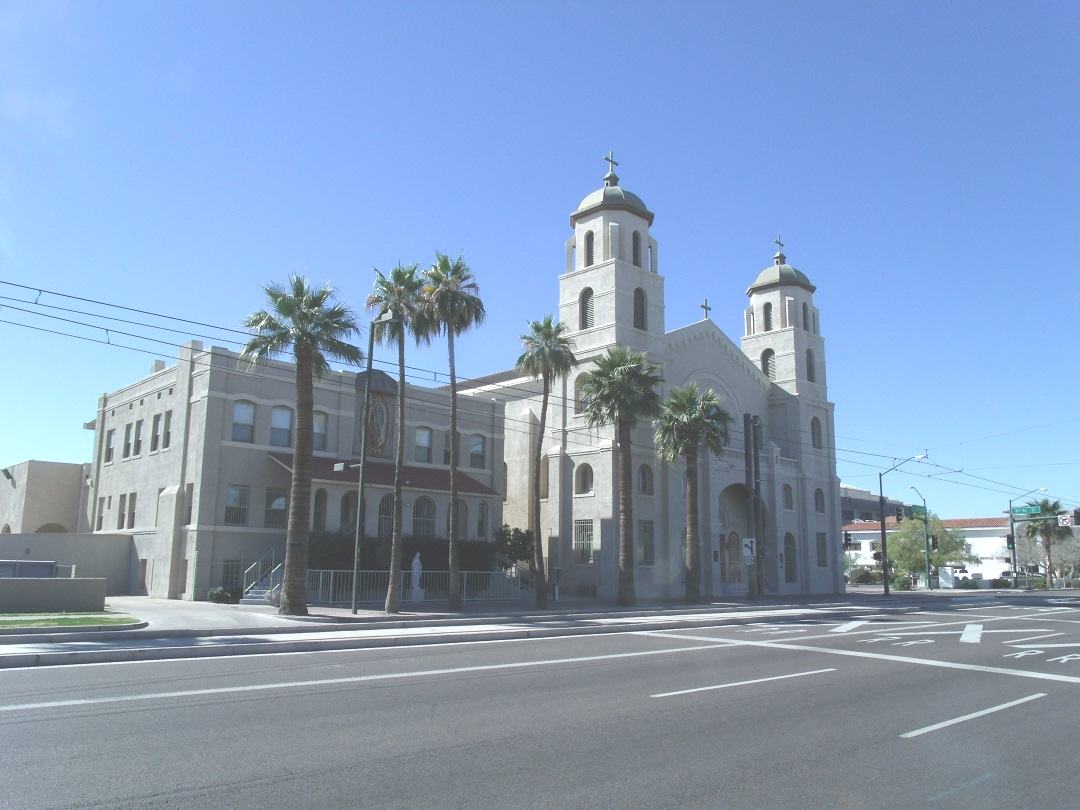
The Immaculate Heart of Mary Catholic Church was built in 1928 and is Phoenix's oldest Hispanic church. It is located at 909 E. Washington St. It was listed in the National Register of Historic Places on October 8, 1993, ref. number 93000742.

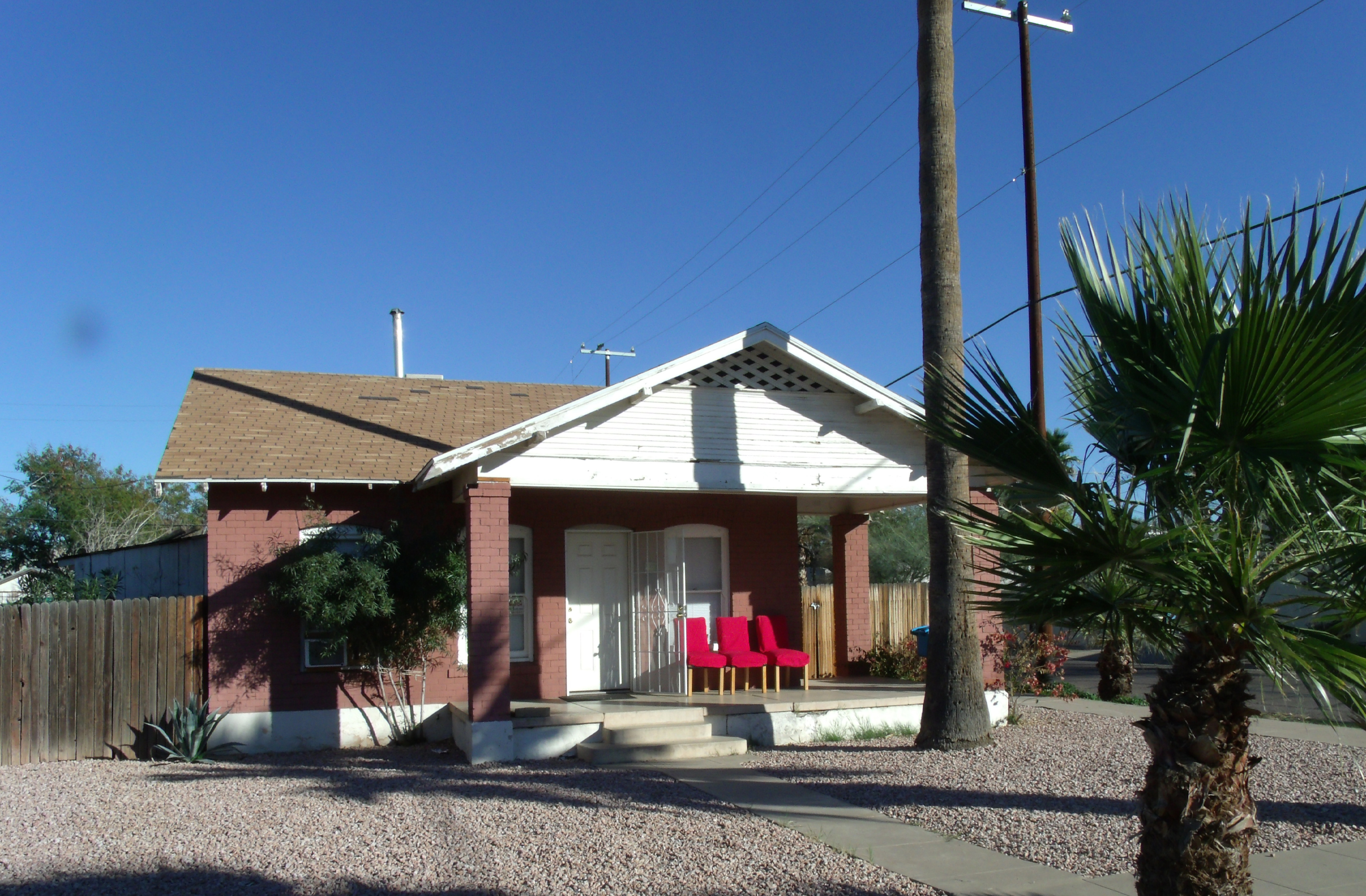
This is the Albert and Mary Garcia House located at 2201 N Dayton St. The house was built in 1930. Albert Garcia became Arizona's first Hispanic Assistant Attorney General, from 1937 until 1942. María Garcia stood out as a woman who courageously spoke up for social issues, even though she was an immigrant and carried a heavy accent. The house is in the Historic Coronado District which is listed in the National Register of Historic Places, reference: #86000206.

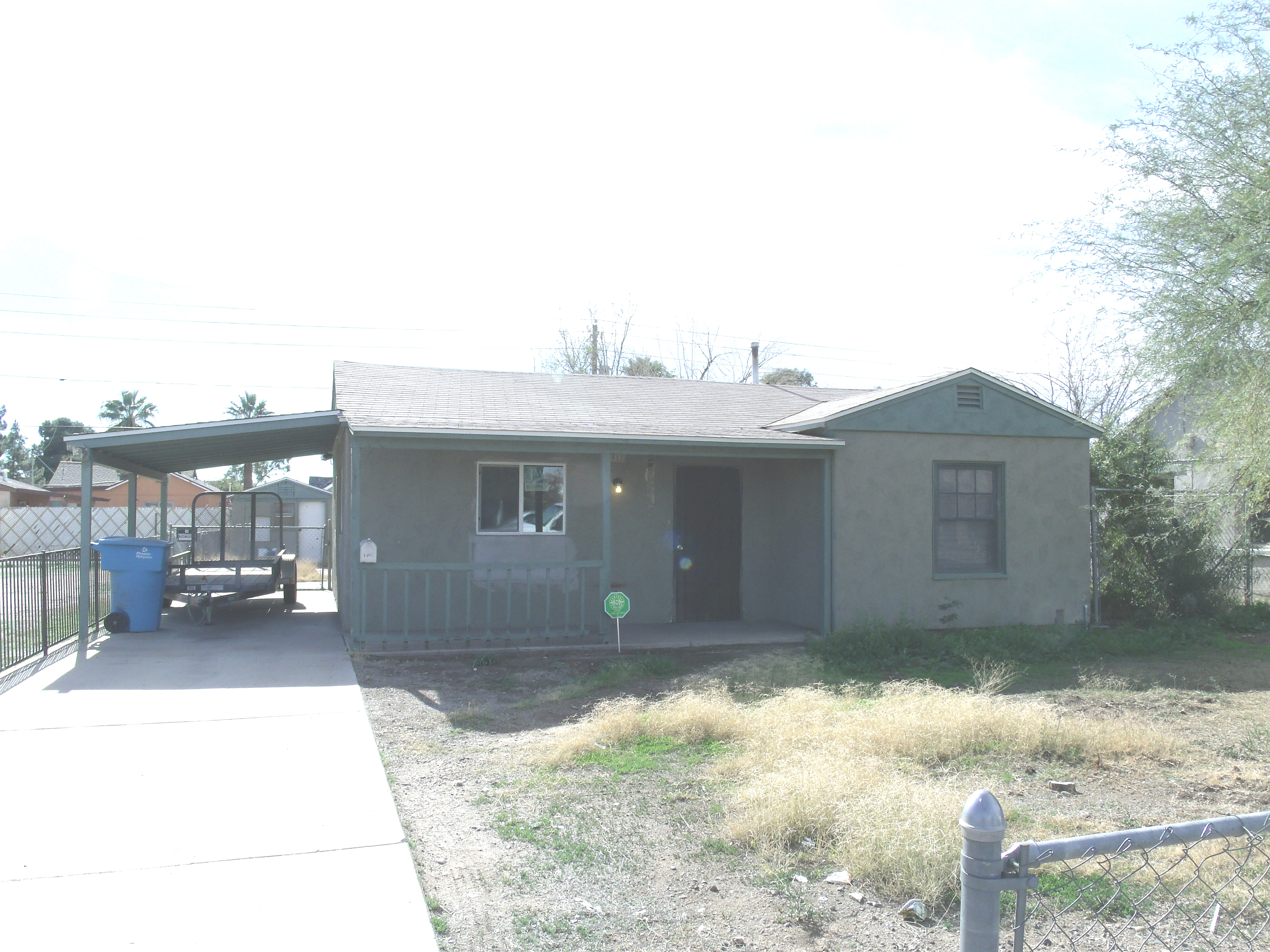
The Valdemar Aguirre Cordova House built in 1930 is located at 1917 W Monte Vista Rd. Cordova served as the first Mexican American Maricopa County Superior Court judge, from 1965 to 1967, and then appointed to a second term in 1976 by Governor Raul Castro. This property is recognized as historic by the Hispanic American Historic Property Survey.

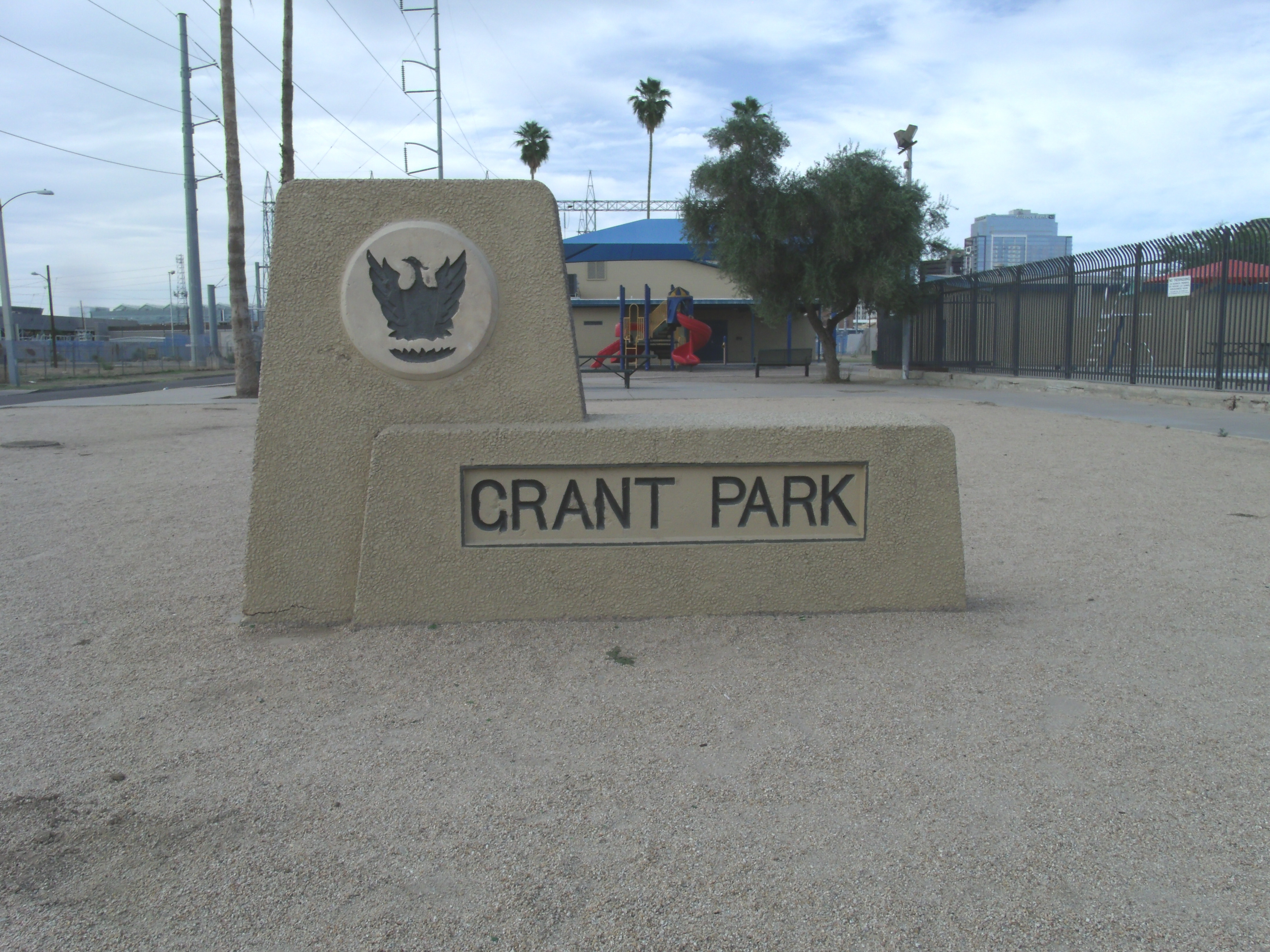
Grant Park is bounded by 714 S. Second Avenue / 701 S. Third Avenue. Grant Park, created in 1934 as part of a WPA construction project, functioned as an important site for Mexican American children's recreation. The recreation programs were led by a recreation director, Laura McClelland, who was well-known in the community for her time and compassion for the area children. The park was listed in the Phoenix Historic Property Register in November 2007.

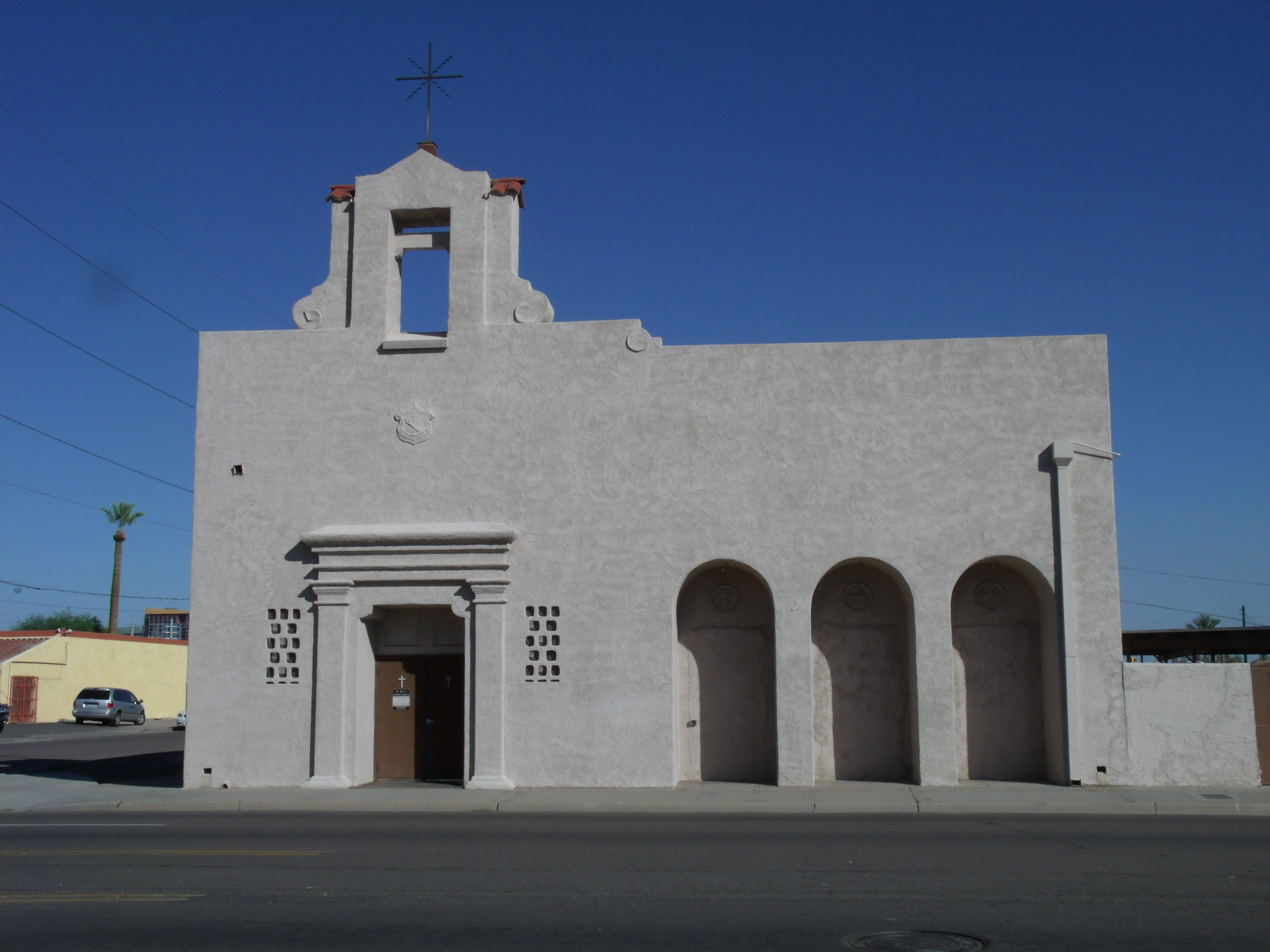
The St. Pius X Catholic Church was built in 1935 and is located at 802-815 South 7th Avenue. The church is listed in the Phoenix Historic Property Register.

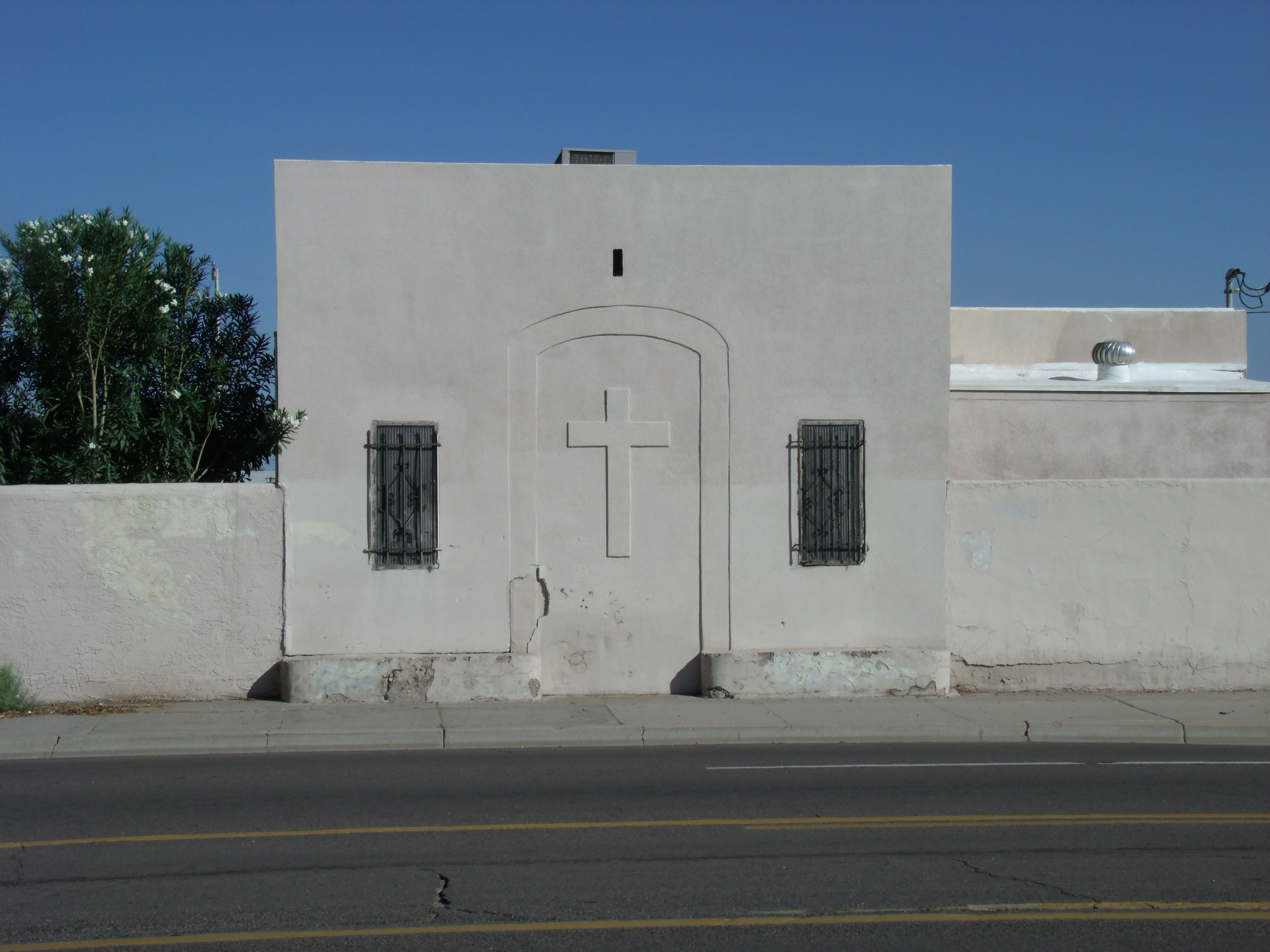
815 is the location where Father Emmett McLoughlin established the historic "Father Emmett Mission" in 1930. The St. Pius X Catholic Church, which merged with the building was built in 1935 and is located at 802-815 South 7th Avenue. It is listed on the Hispanic American Historic Property Survey.

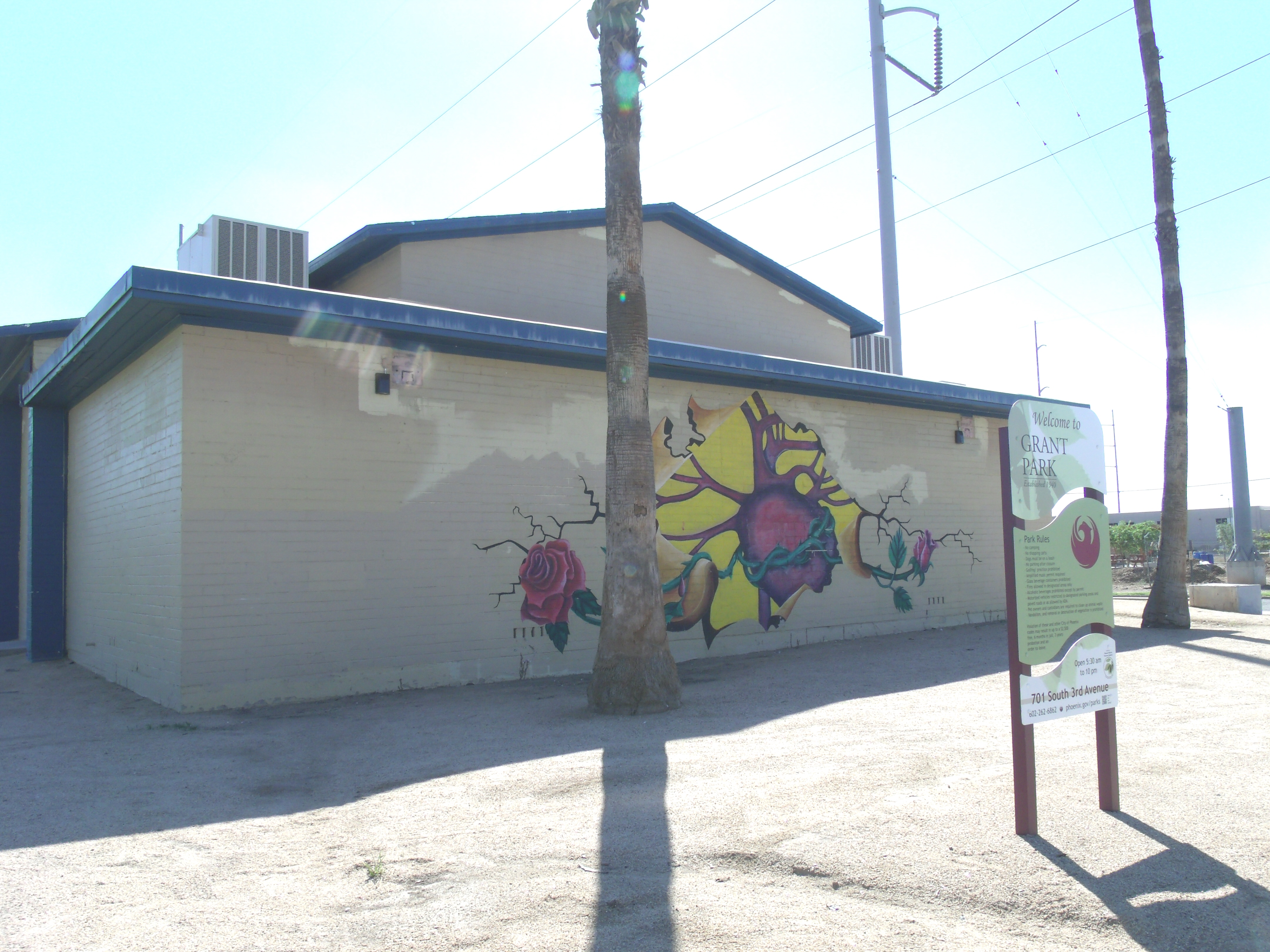
The Grant Park Pool building was built in 1944 as a result of the 1934 Civil Works Administration funding. It is located in the corner of Grant St. and 2nd Avenue. The Pool served the Hispanic community of Phoenix at a time when the usage of public swimming pools was segregated. Grant Park, where the pool is located, is listed in the Phoenix Historic Property Register.

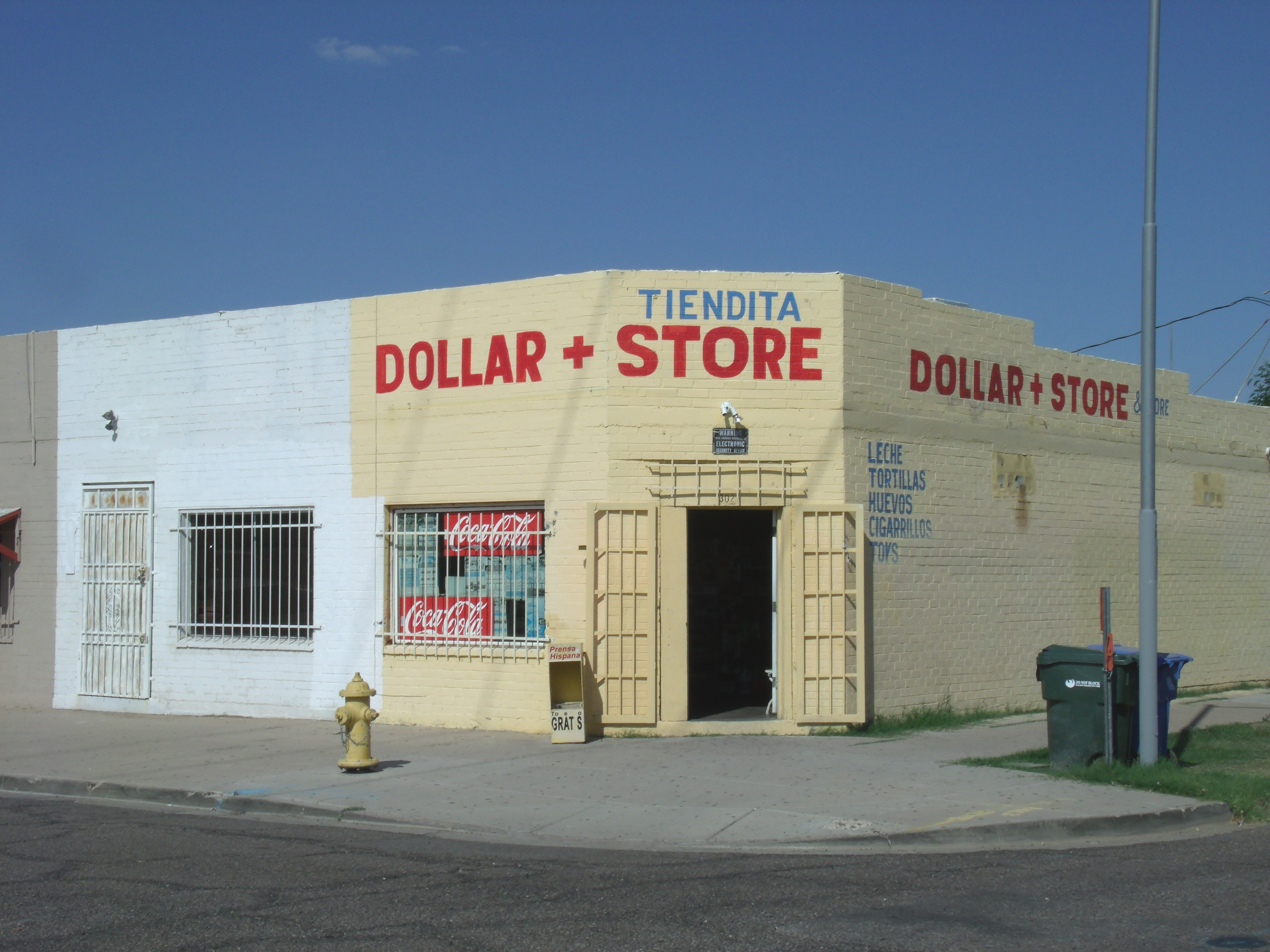
This is where La Estrella Tortilla Shop was once located. The building was built in 1938 and is located at 302 Yavapai St. and 3rd Aven ue. This property is recognized as historic by the Hispanic American Historic Property Survey of the City of Phoenix.

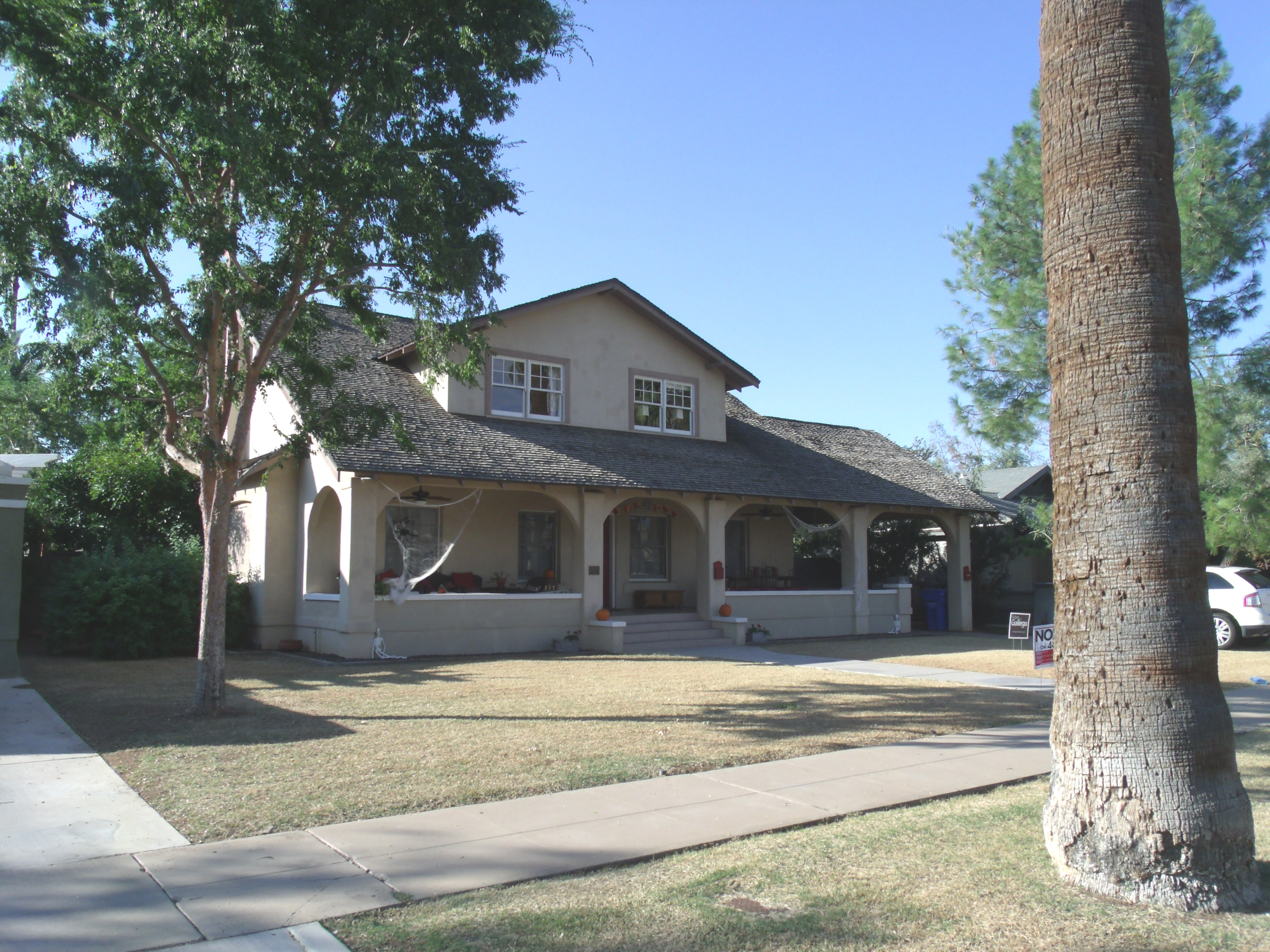
The Jesus Franco House was built in 1940 and is located at 321 W. Portland Avenue. The Spanish-language newspaper, El Sol, emerged in 1938 under the leadership of Jesús Franco, who became a very well-known individual in the Mexican community. This property is recognized as historic by the Hispanic American Historic Property Survey of the City of Phoenix. The house is listed in the National Register of Historic Places as part of the Roosevelt Historic District reference number: #83003490.

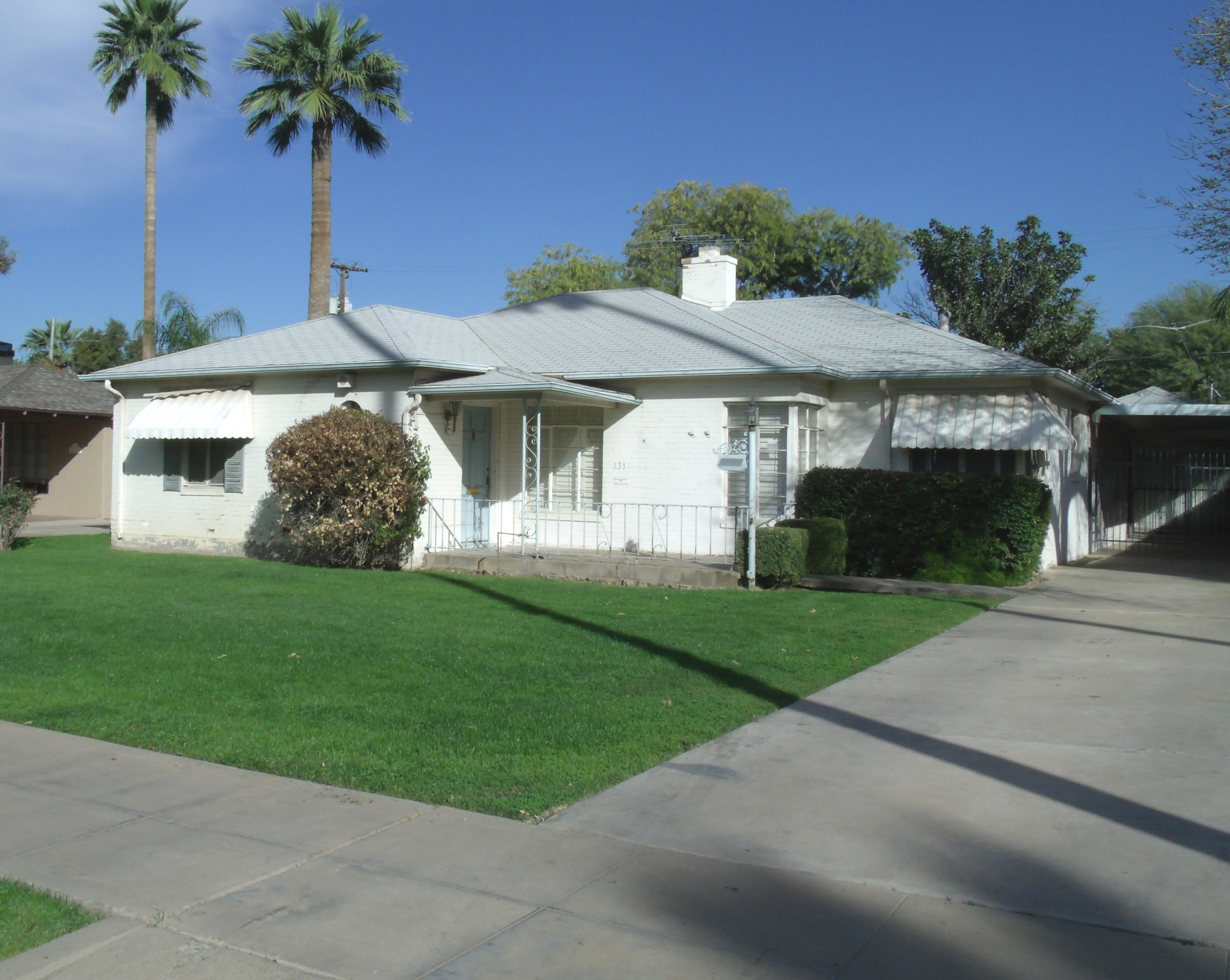
The Rudolf Zepeda House was built in 1940 and is locate at 1310 W Palm Lane. Rudolf Zepeda, became the first Hispanic official at Valley National Bank in the 1950s, serving as the vice-president for foreign trade. The house is located in the Encanto Historic District which was listed in the National Register of Historic Places on February 16, 1984, reference #84000696.

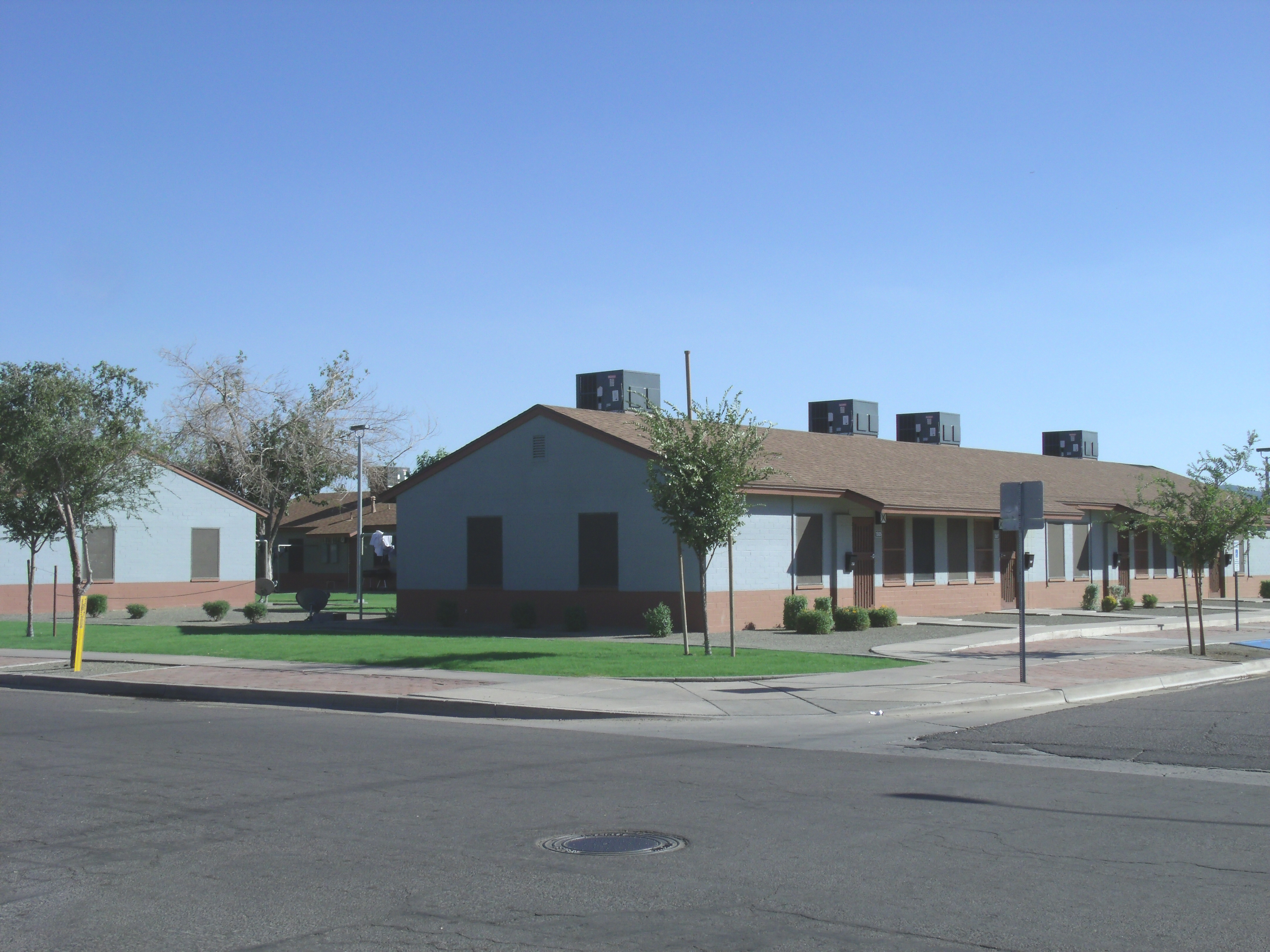
The Marcos de Niza Housing Project was established by Father Emmett McLoughlin in 1941. The housing project is located at 305 W. Pima St. This property is recognized as historic by the Hispanic American Historic Property Survey of the City of Phoenix.

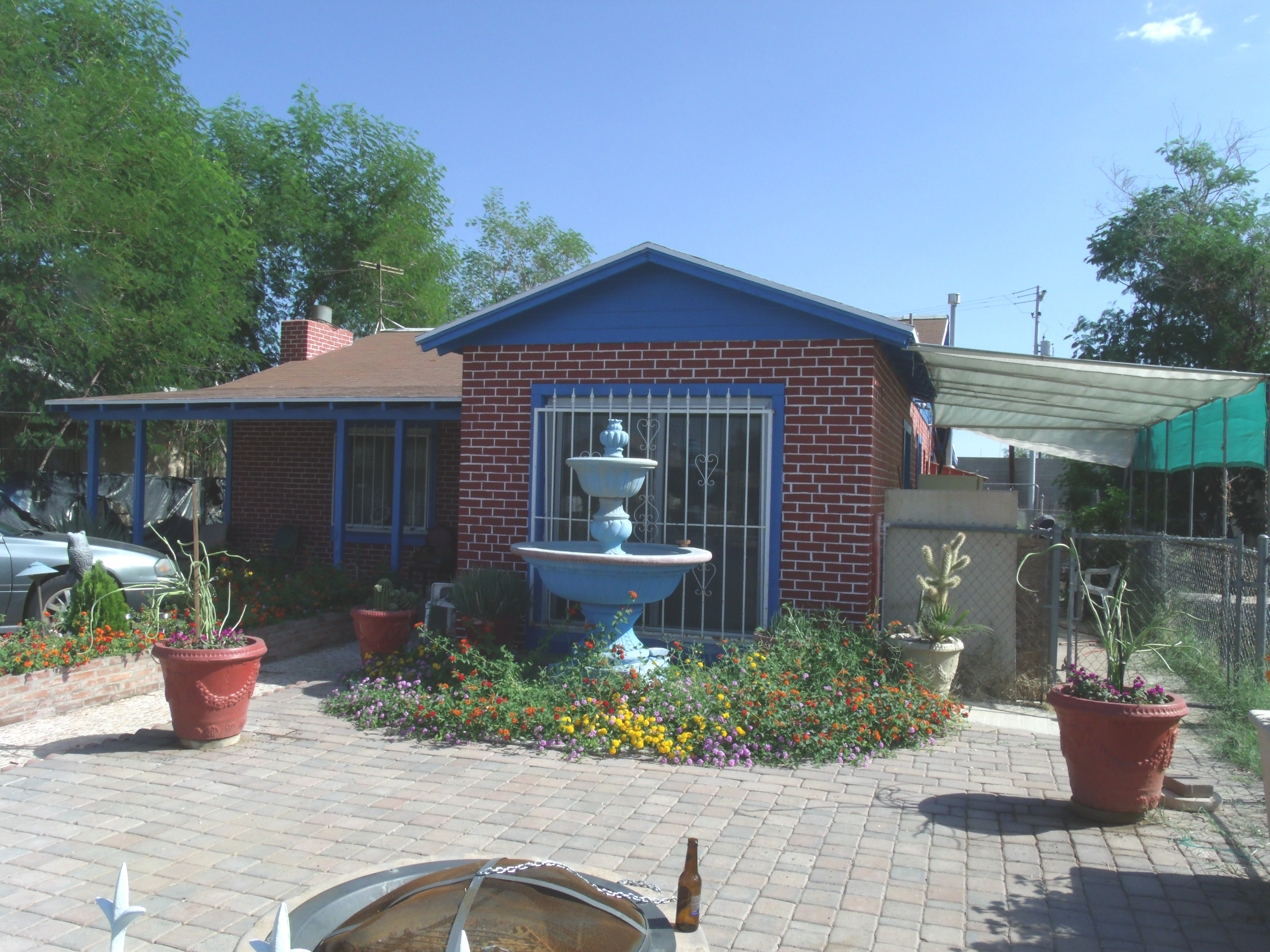
The Adam Perez Diaz House was built in 1942 and is located at 1313 S. 1st St. This property is recognized as historic by the Hispanic American Historic Property Survey of the City of Phoenix.

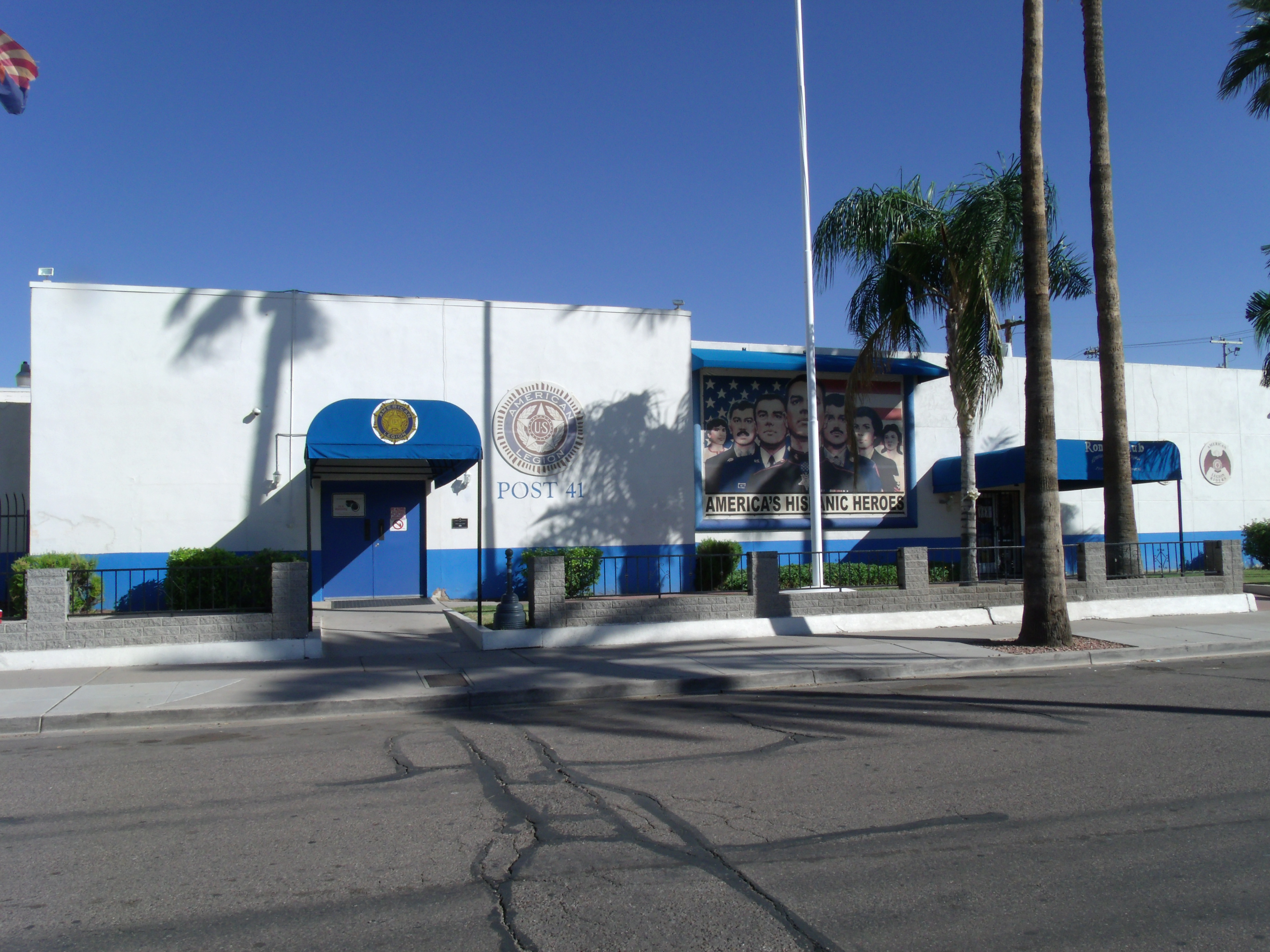
The American Legion Post #41 , also known as the "Tony Souza-Ray Martinez Thunderbird Post #41", was built in 1945 and is located at 715 S. 3rd Avenue. This property is recognized as historic by the Hispanic American Historic Property Survey of the City of Phoenix. The building was listed in the Phoenix Historic Property Register in November 2007.

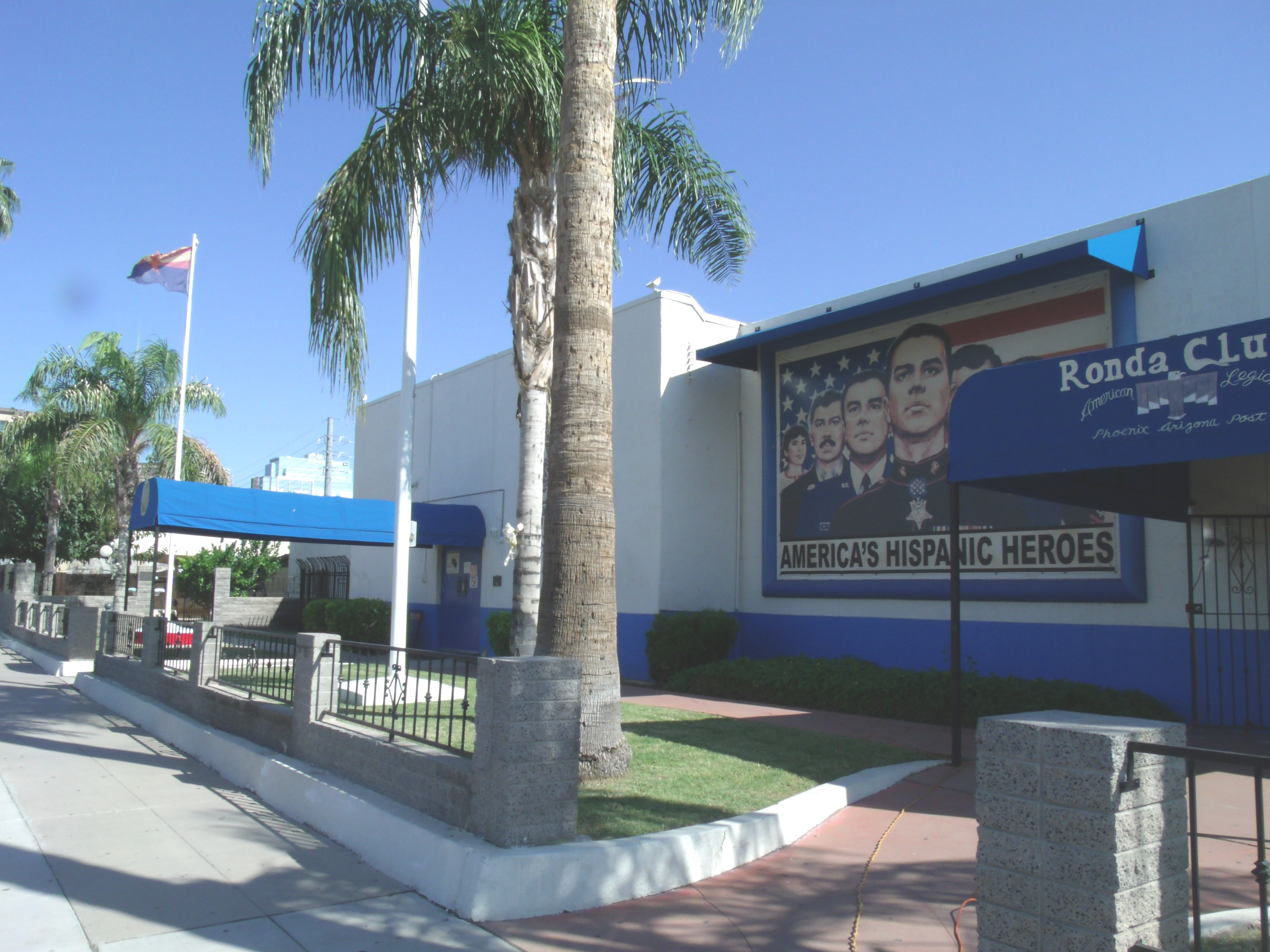
Different view of the American Legion Post #41.

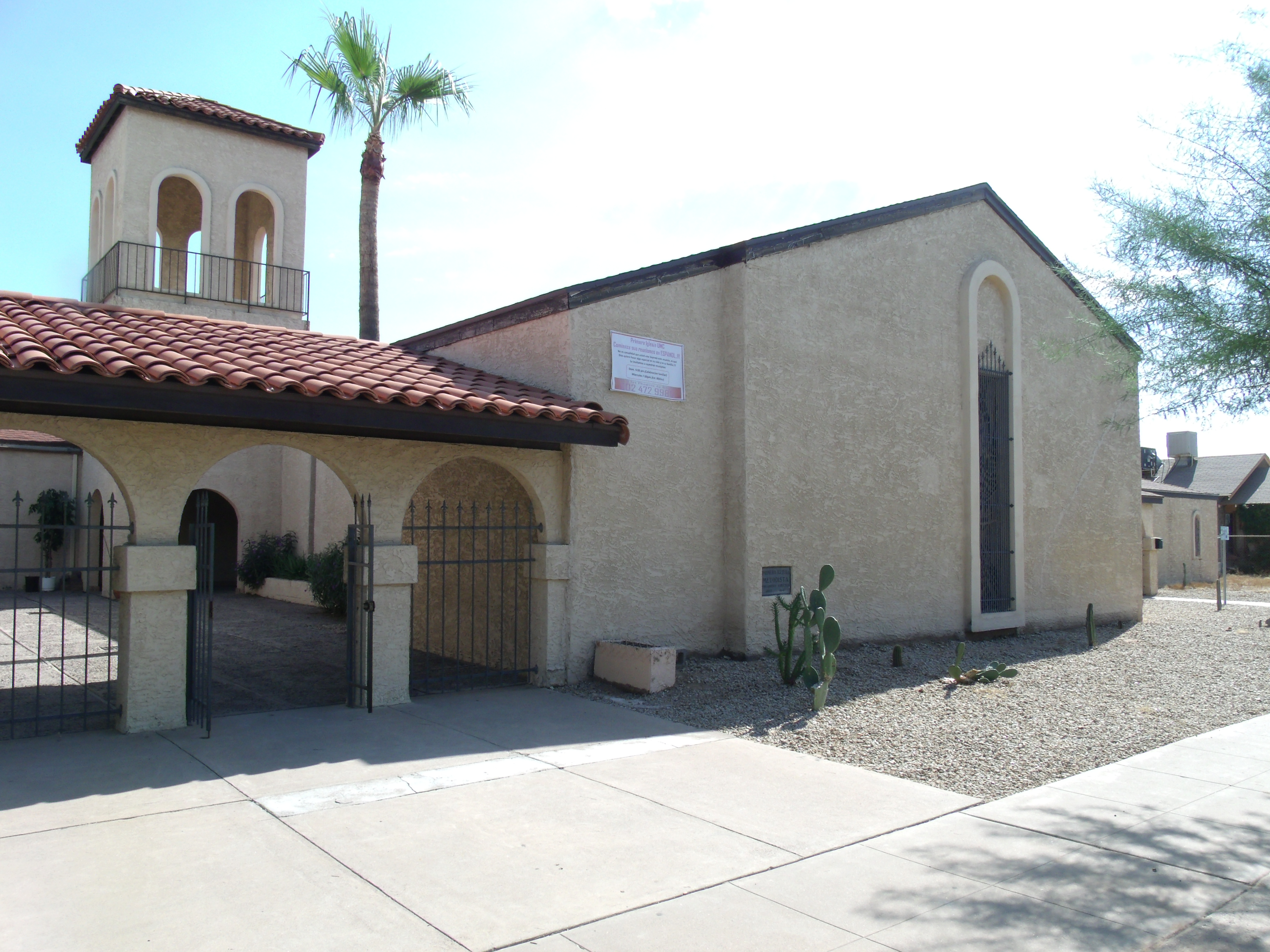
The Primera Iglesia Metodista (First Methodist Church) was built in 1947 and located at 701 S. 1st St. This property is recognized as historic by the Hispanic American Historic Property Survey of the City of Phoenix. It was designated as a landmark with Historic Preservation-Landmark (HP-L) overlay zoning. It is listed in the Phoenix Historic Property Register.

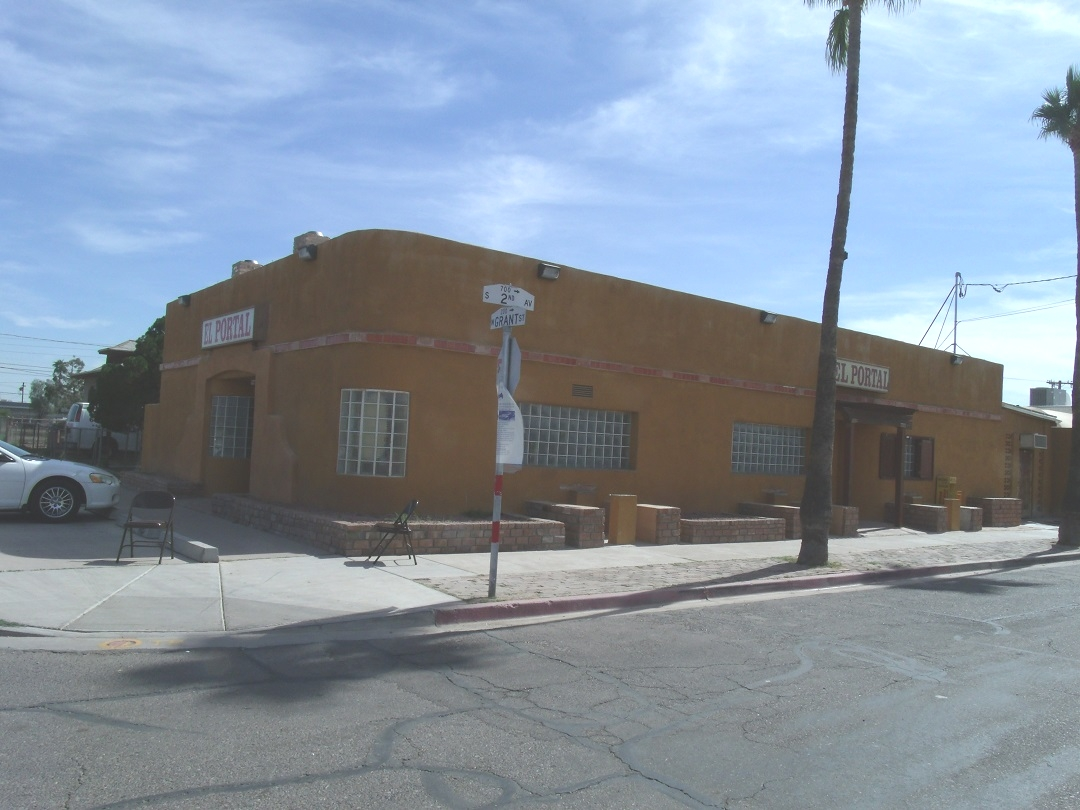
Different view of the El Portal restaurant.

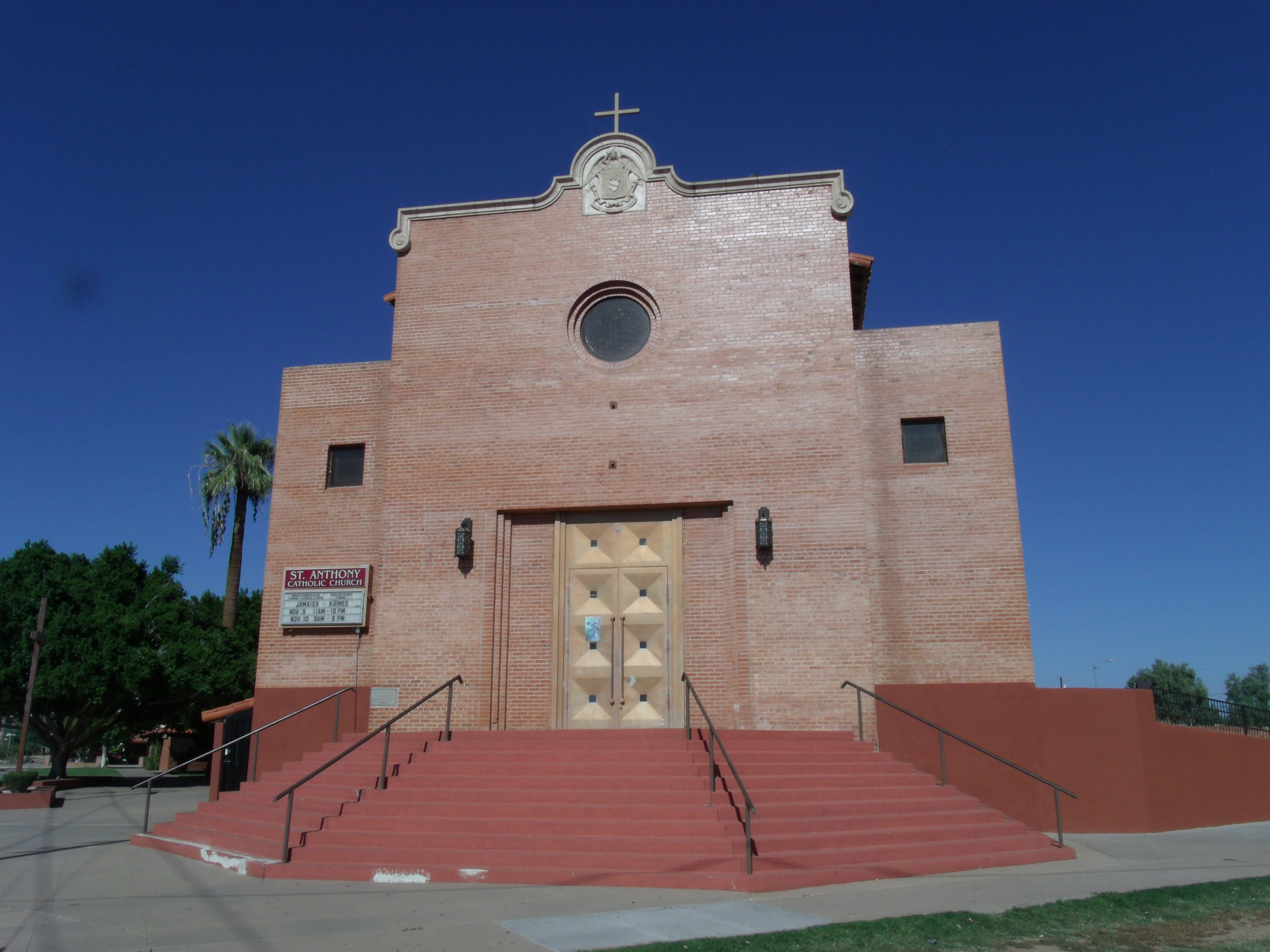
St. Anthony Church was built in 1948 and is located at 909 S. 1st St. This property is recognized as historic by the Hispanic American Historic Property Survey of the City of Phoenix.

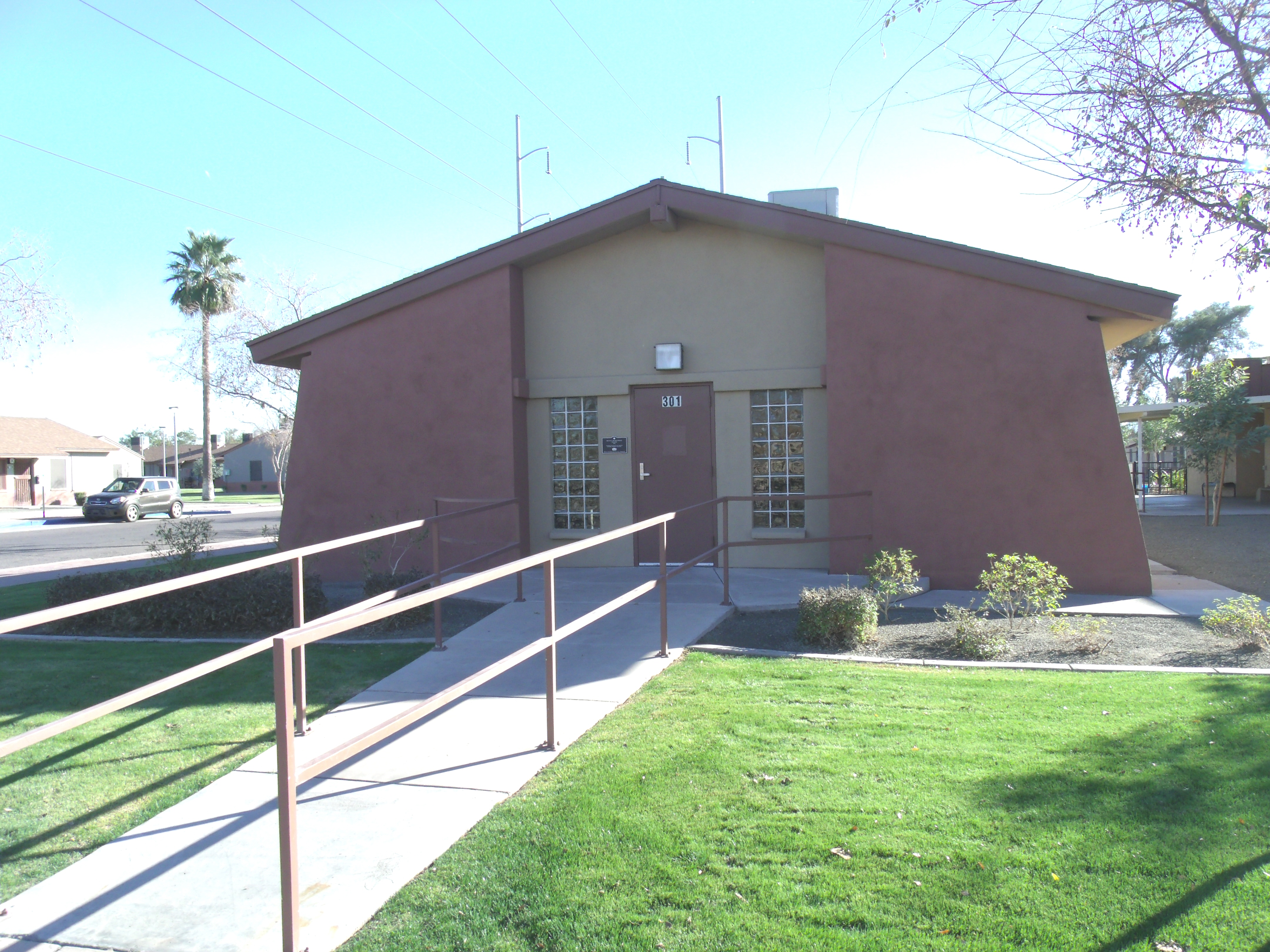
The once location of the Iglesia 'Betania Presbiteriana. The structure was built in 1950 and is located at 301 W Pima Street. This property is recognized as historic by the Hispanic American Historic Property Survey.

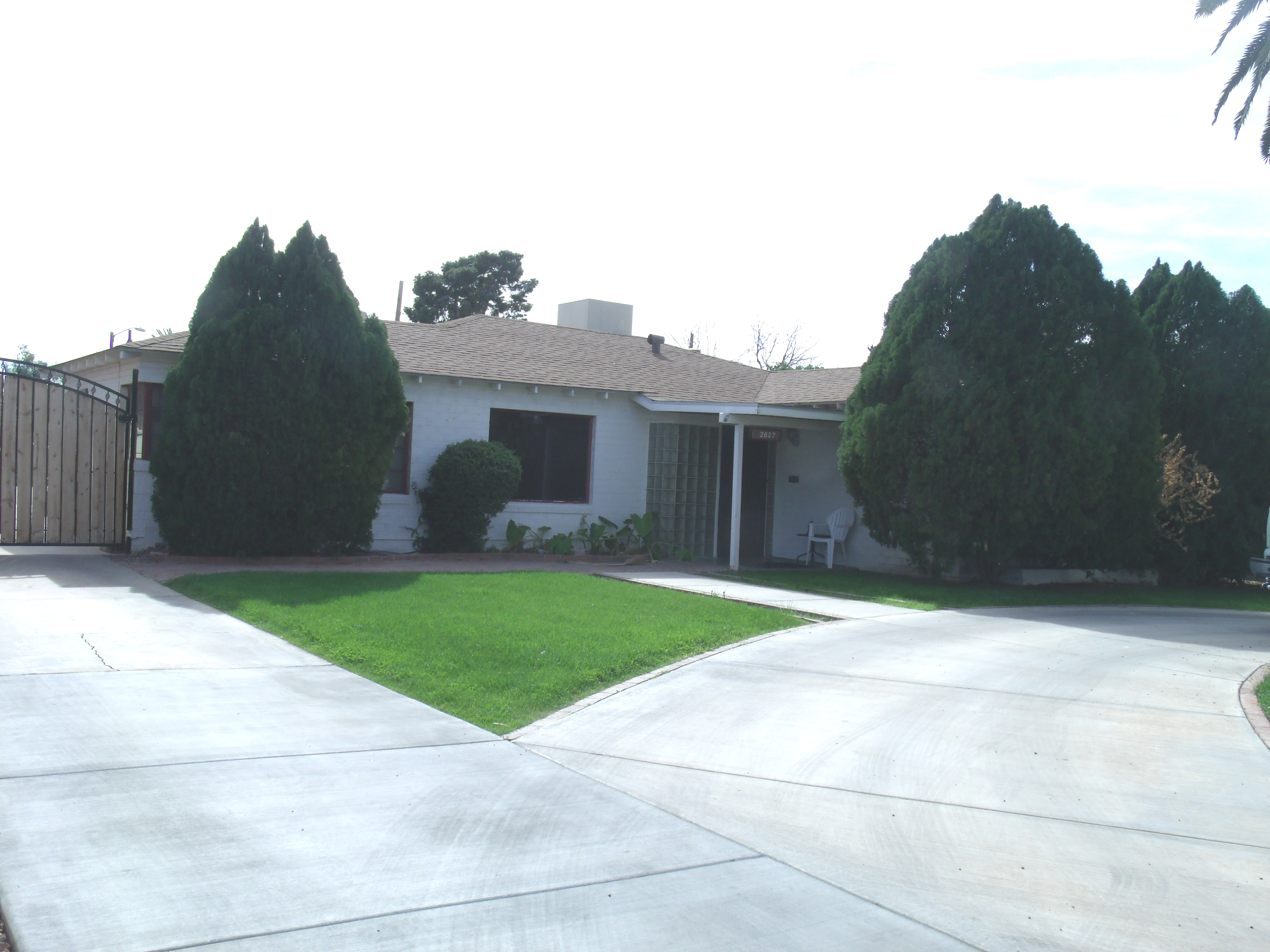
The Vincente Canalez House was built in 1951 and is located at 2627 N Evergreen St. Canalez co-owned the Ramona Pharmacy with future Arizona governor Bob Jones. Canalez later became involved in the Democratic Party as a precinct committeeman. In 1945 he was selected to serve as Maricopa County chairman to fight infantile paralysis, and served on the City of Phoenix's planning commission in the 1950s. He moved to the Arizona town of Buckeye in 1957, and served as mayor of Buckeye in 1960. This property is recognized as historic by the Hispanic American Historic Property Survey.

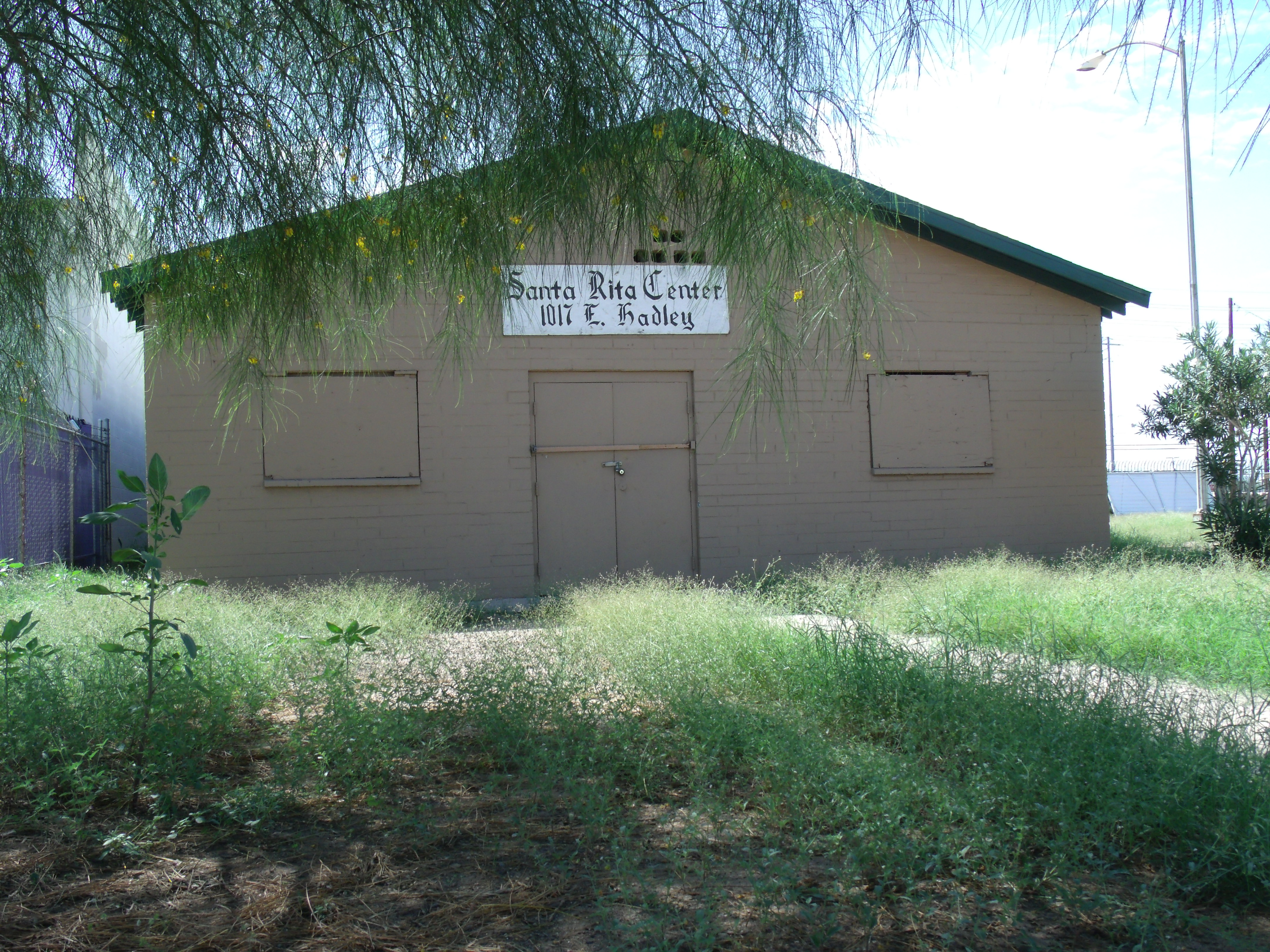
This historic building is the Santa Rita Center (also known as Santa Rita Hall). It is located at 1017 E. Hadley Street between 10th Street and 10th Place. It was here where Arizona native Cesar Chavez, the hero of farm workers, began his 24-day hunger strike on May 11, 1972, to draw attention to the inhumane conditions farm workers endured in the fields. Coretta King met with Chavez in the hall during his fast. For a while, the hall was the headquarters of what became the United Farm Workers of America Union. The structure, which was built in 1962, was listed in the Phoenix Historic Property Register in October 2007.

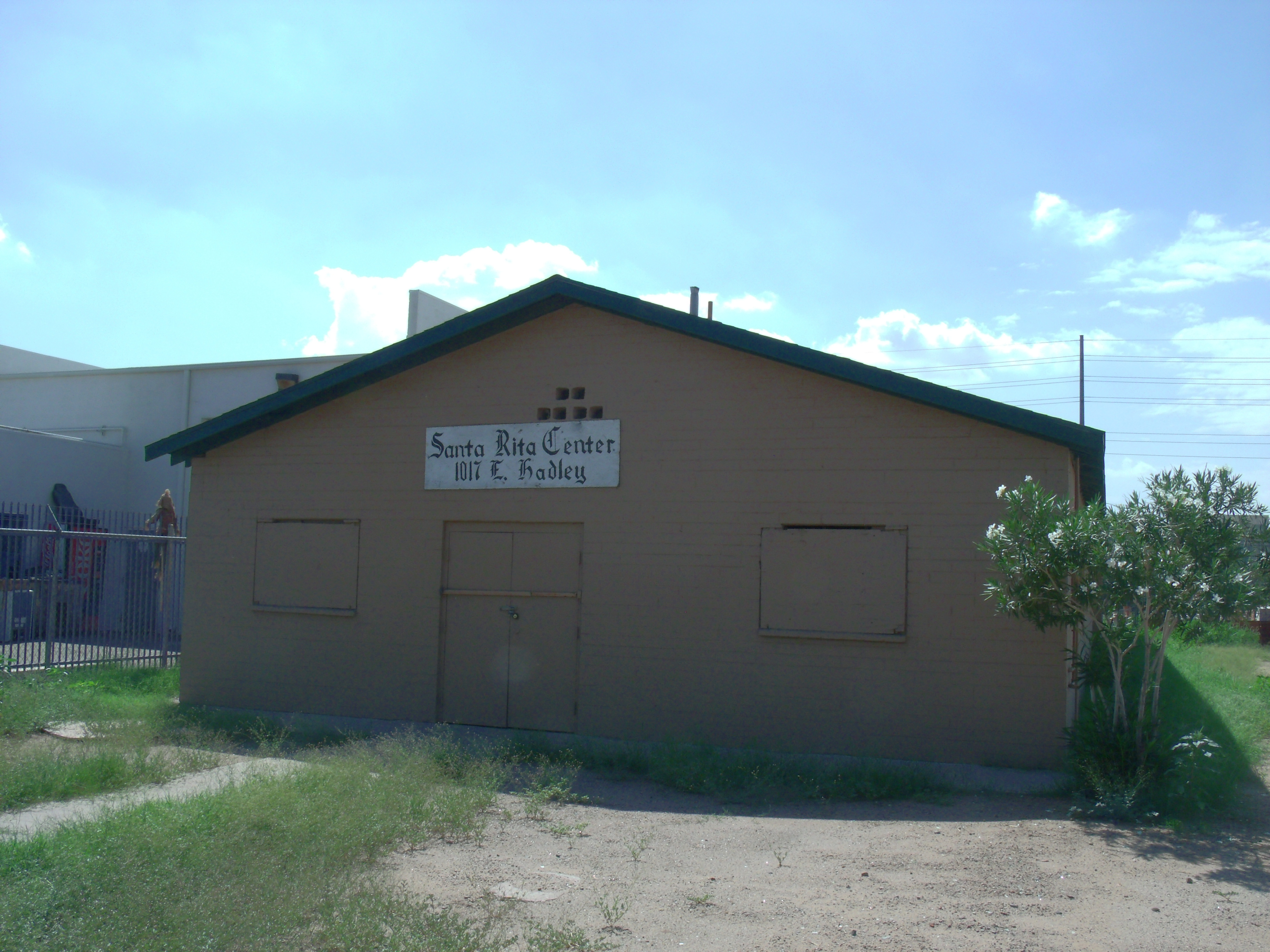
A different view of the historic Santa Rita Center.

=== Arizona Biltmore Hotel ===
Arizona Biltmore Hotel
Listed in the National Register of Historic Places

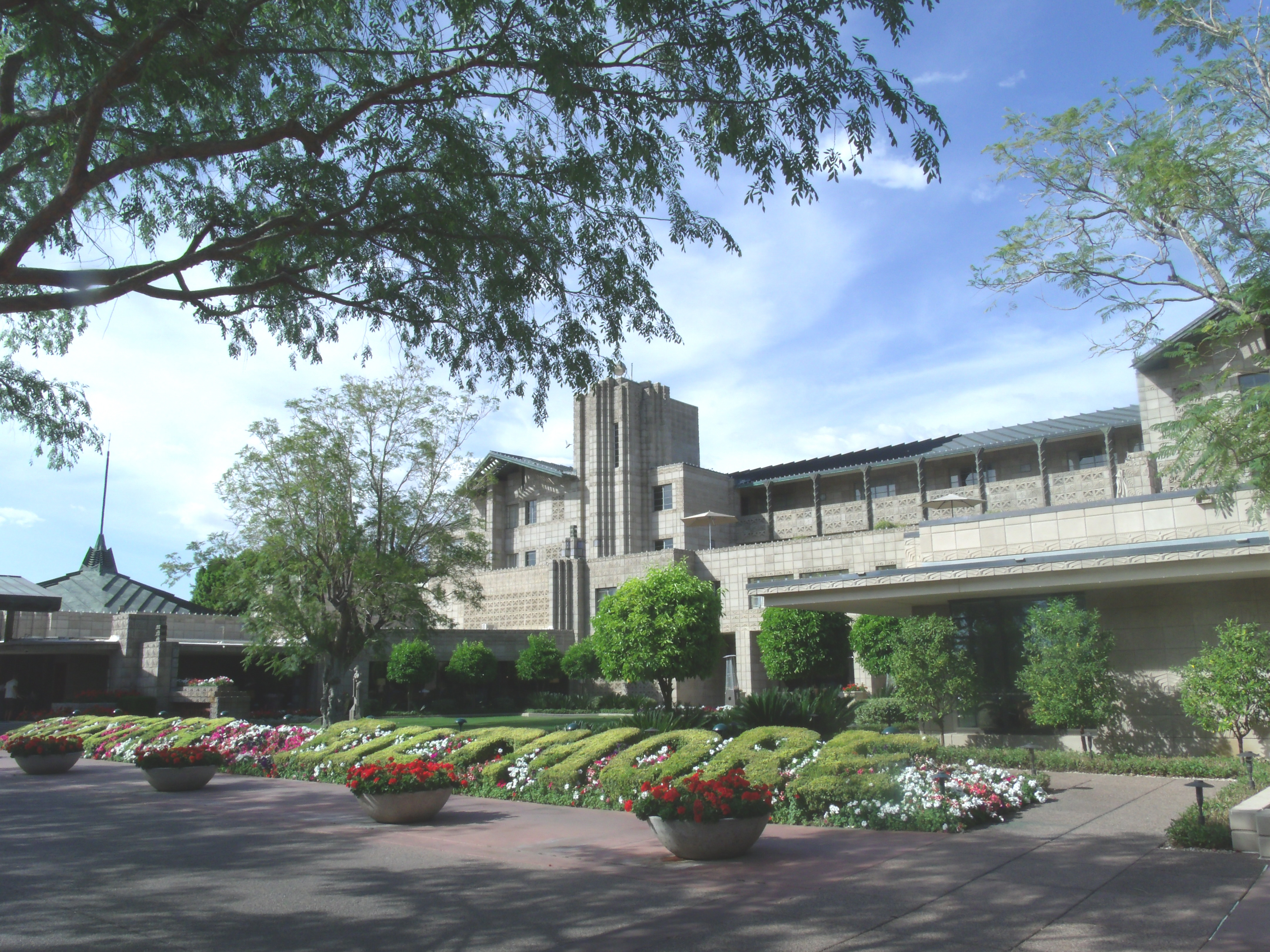
The Arizona Biltmore Hotel is known as the "Jewel of the Desert".

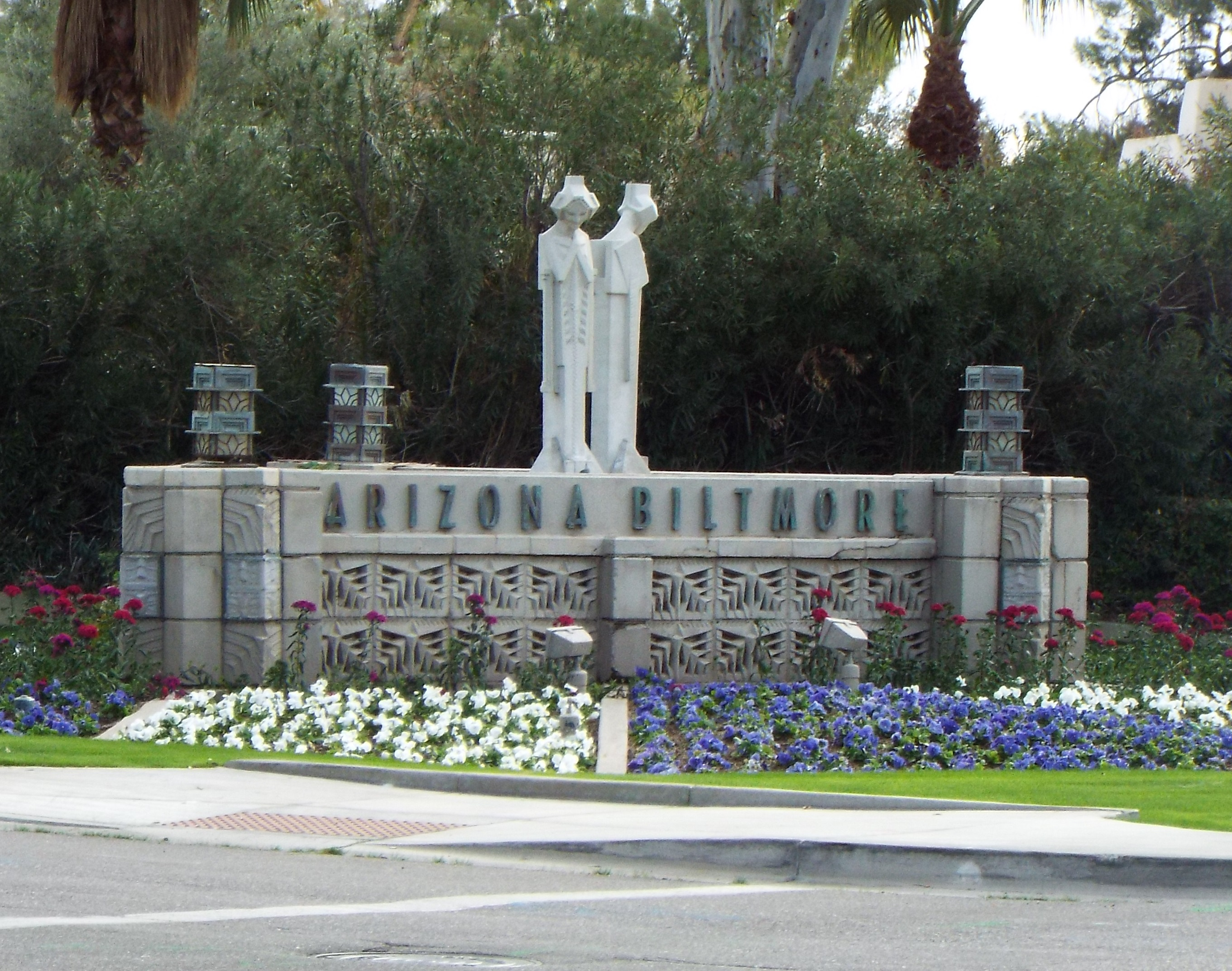
Hotel street entrance

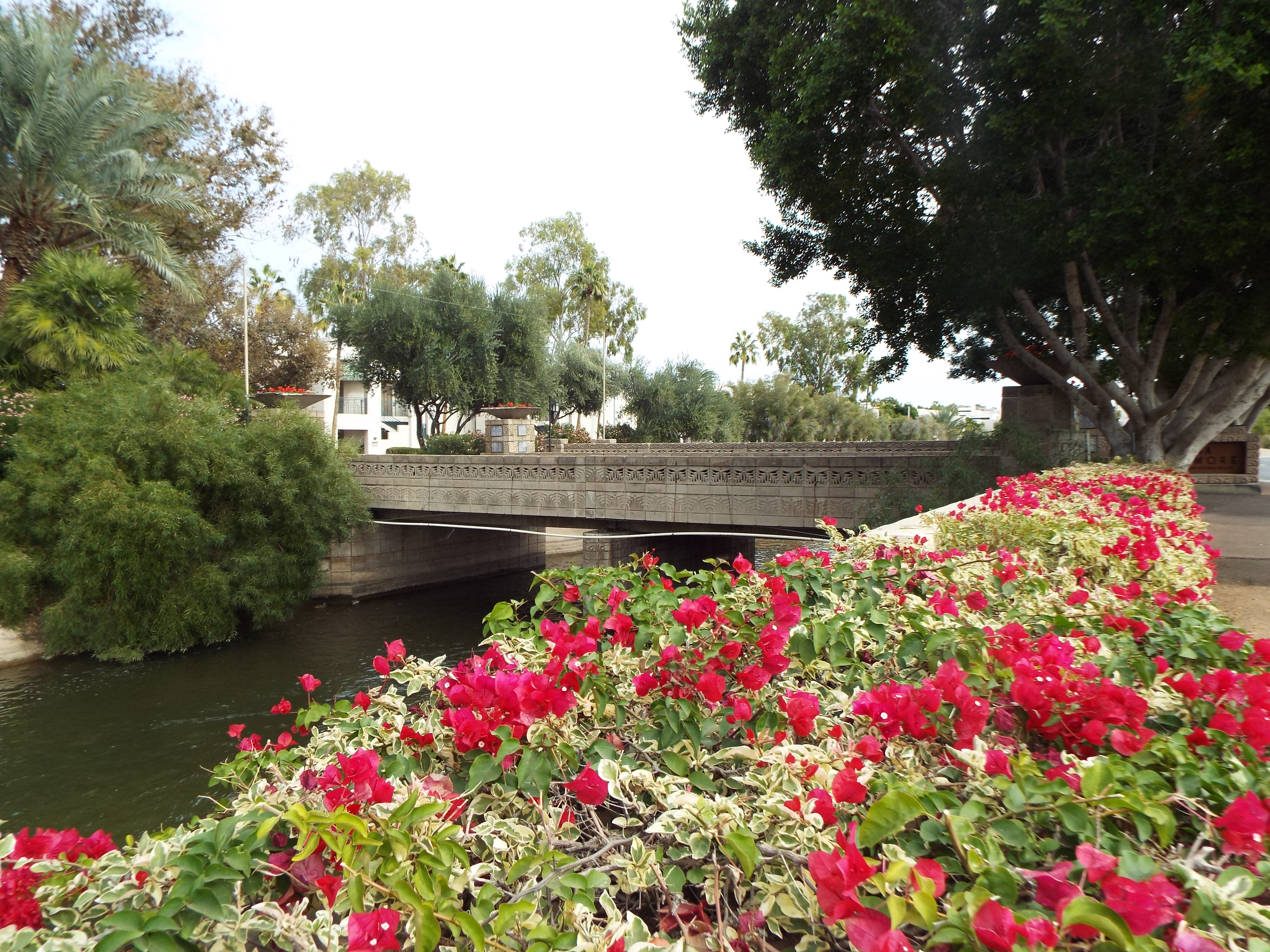
Arizona Biltmore Hotel bridge

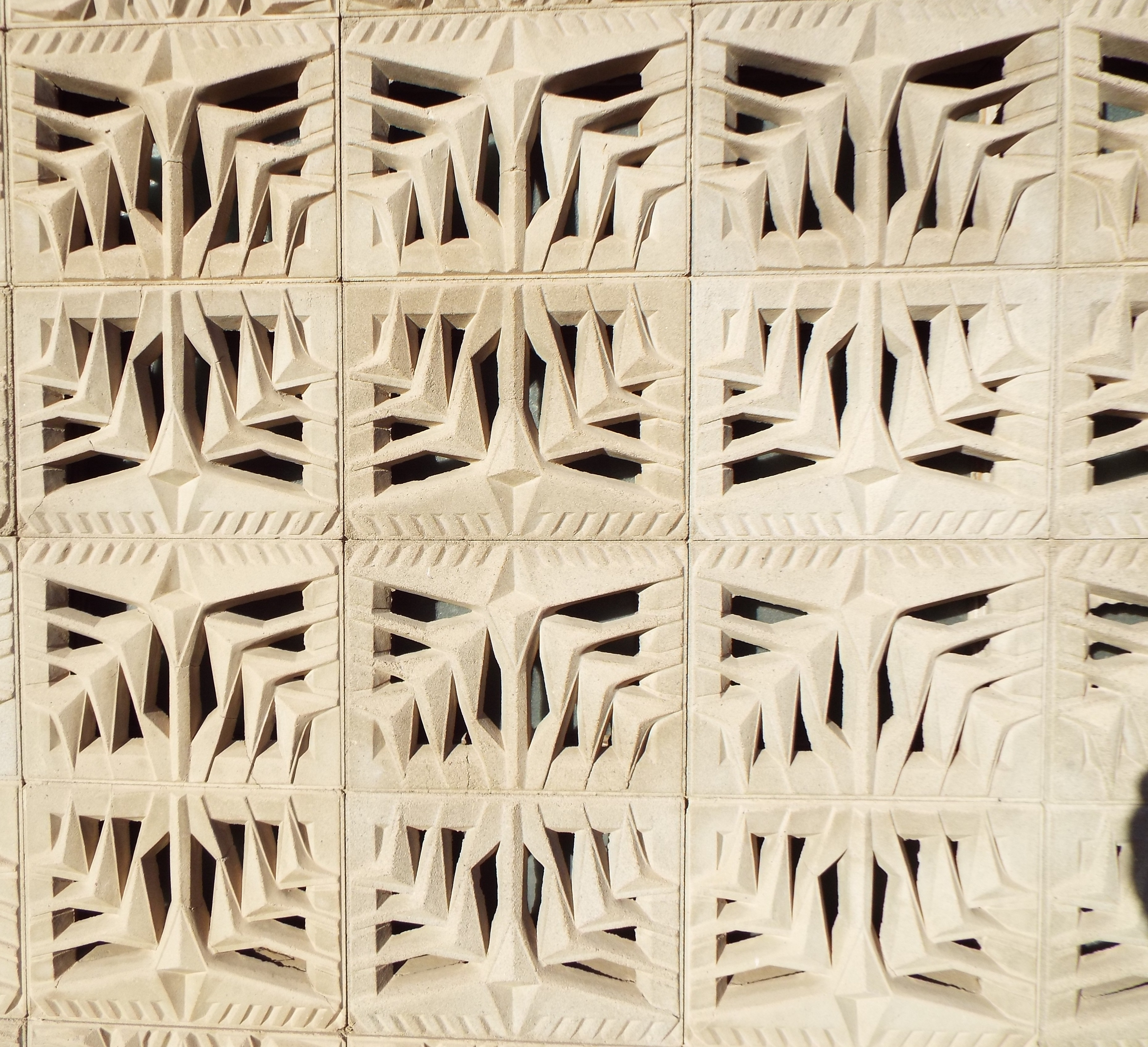
Stylized bricks by architect, Albert Chase McArthur.

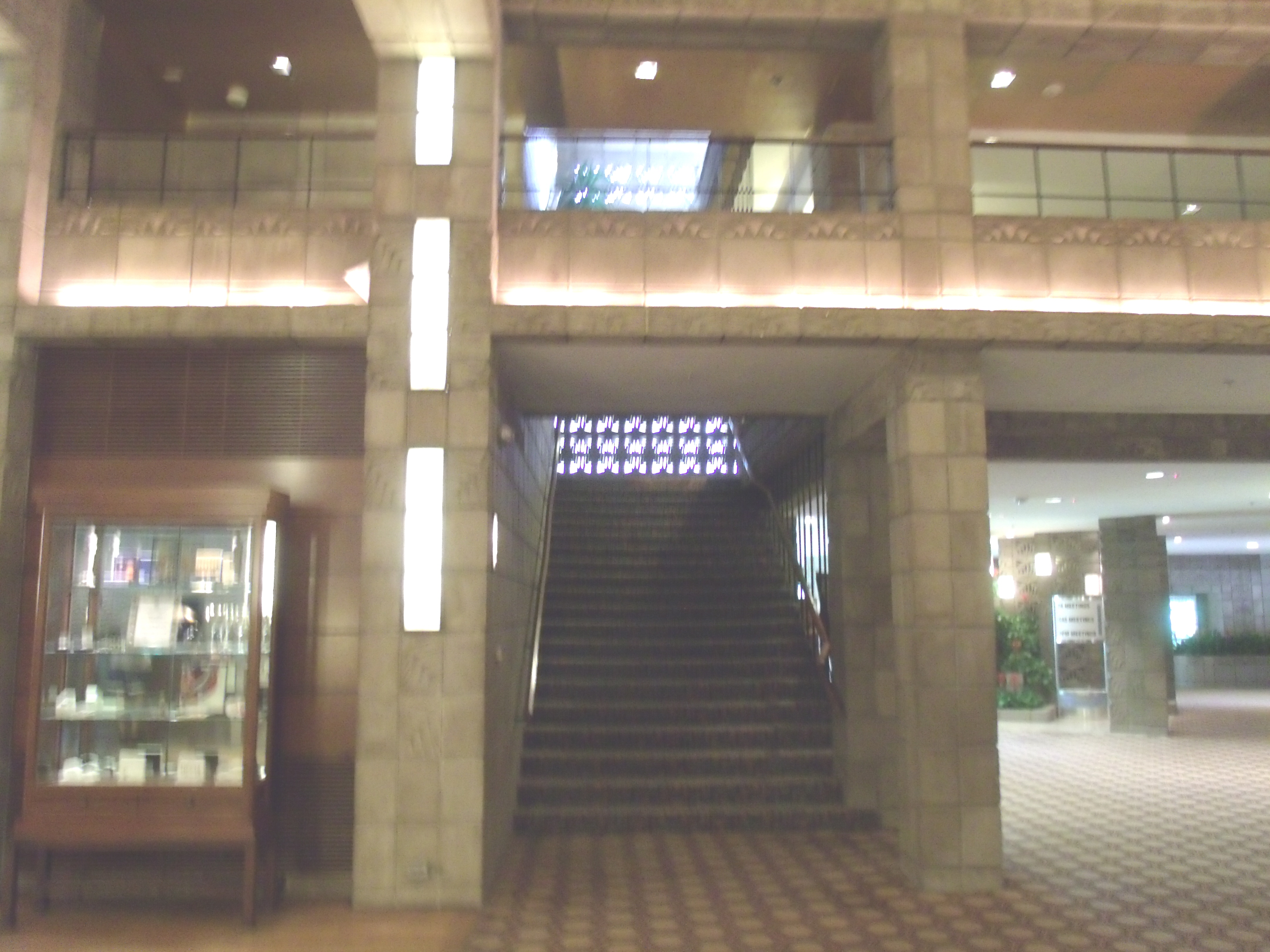
Inside view of the main entrance of the Arizona Biltmore Hotel.

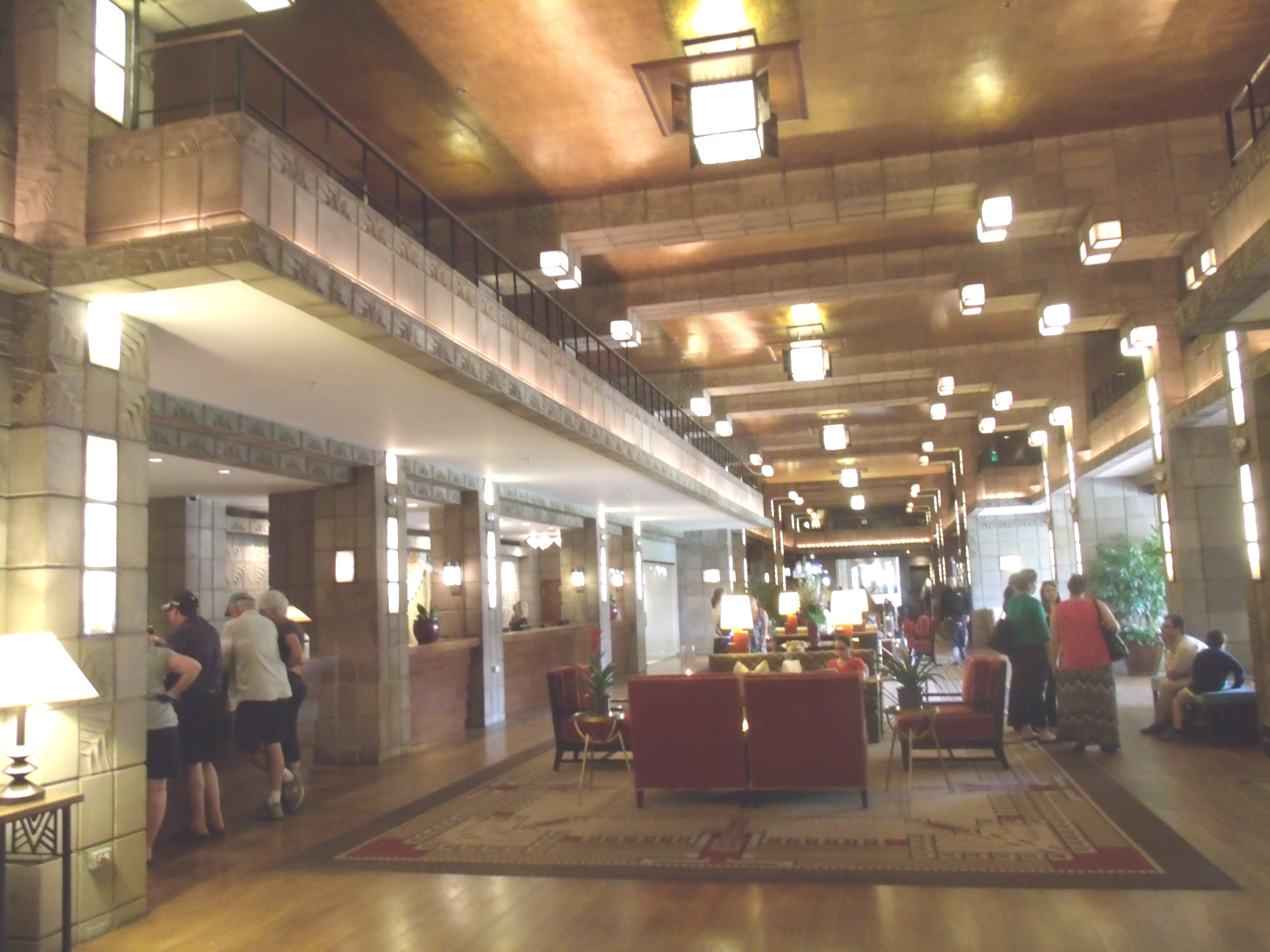
The lobby of the Arizona Biltmore Hotel.

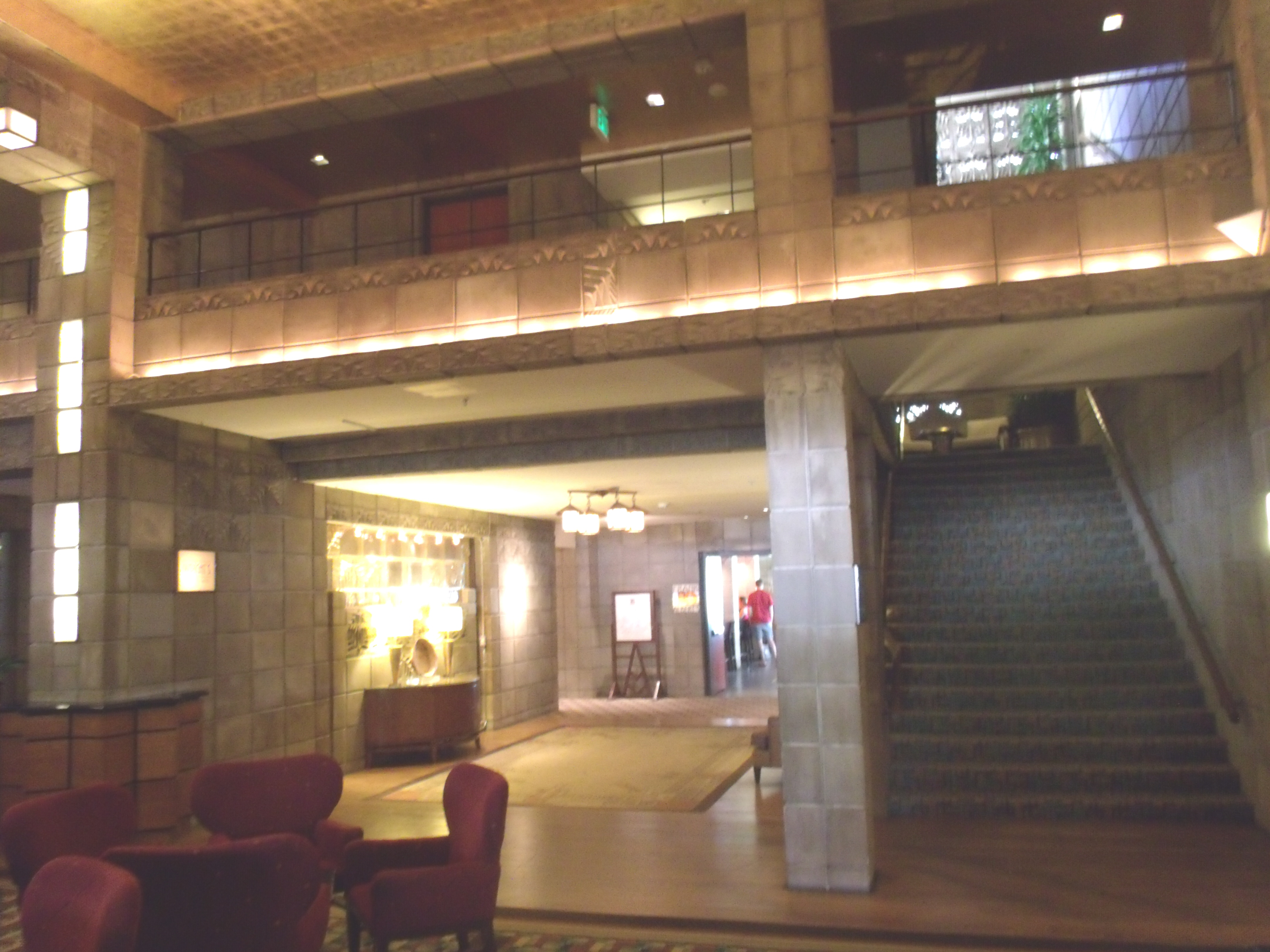
The Paradise Wing of the Arizona Biltmore Hotel built in 1929 and located at 2400 Missouri Avenue.

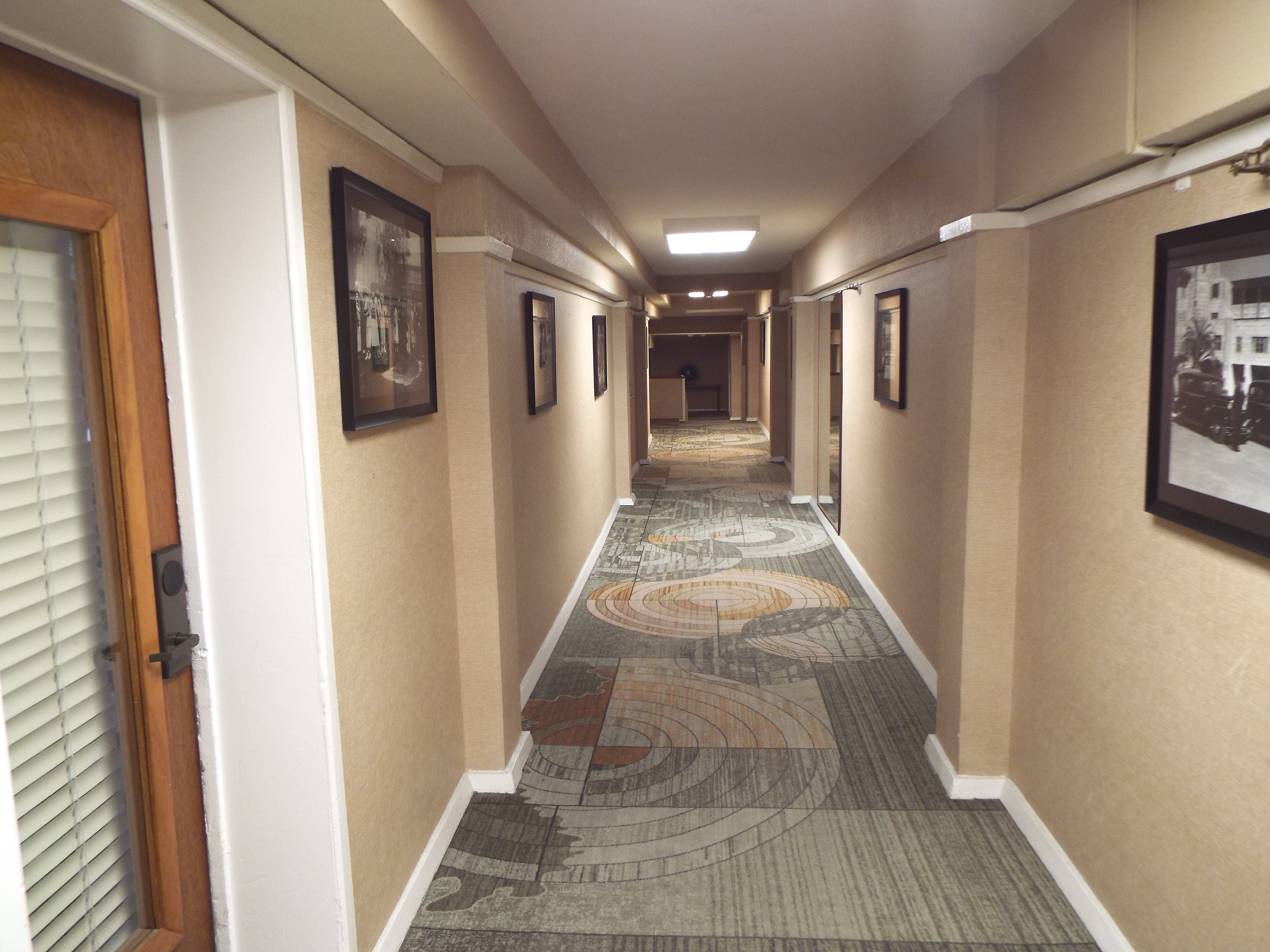
Mystery Room secret passageway.

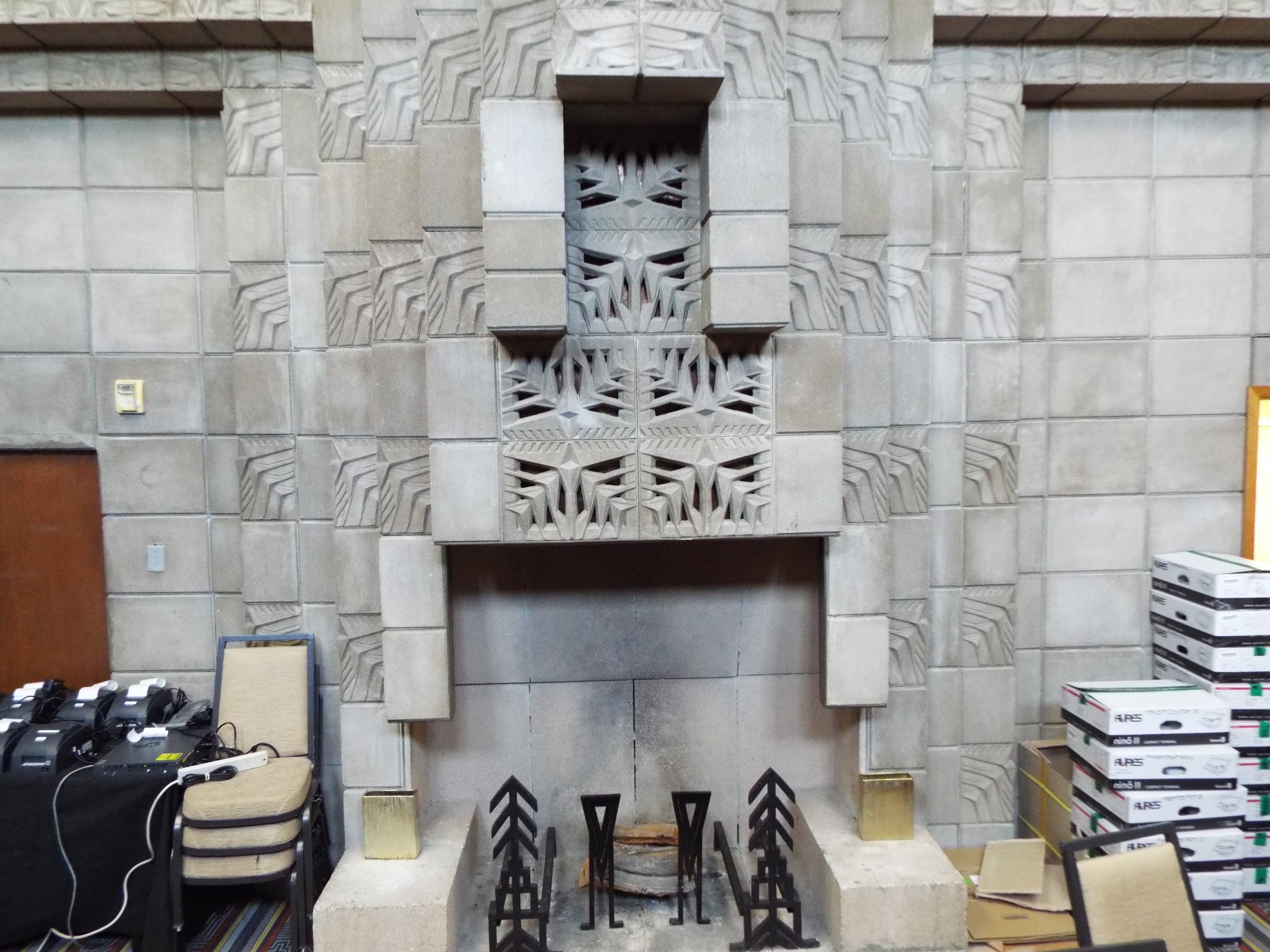
The fireplace inside the Mystery Room.

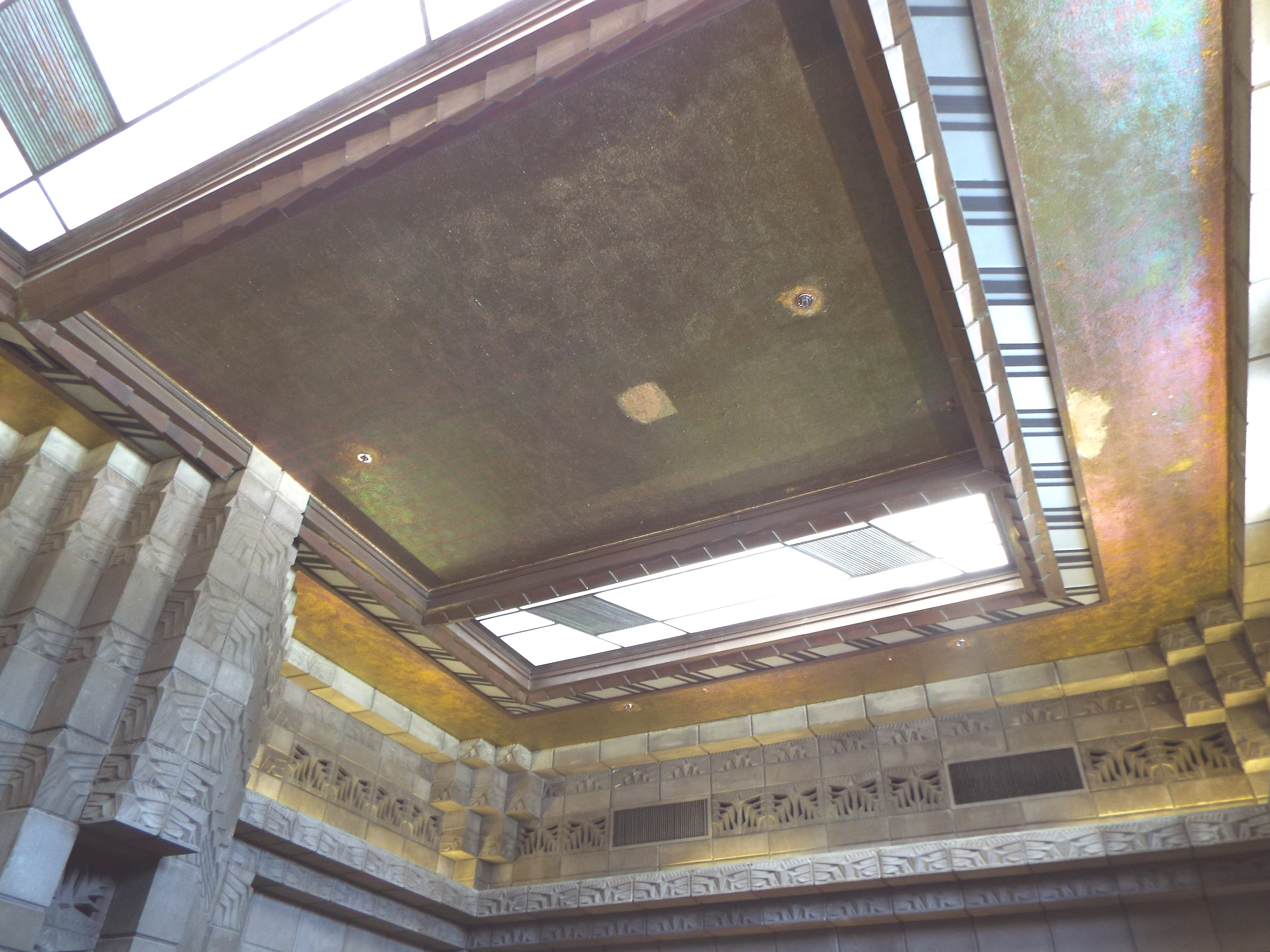
Stained glass ceiling in the Mystery Room.

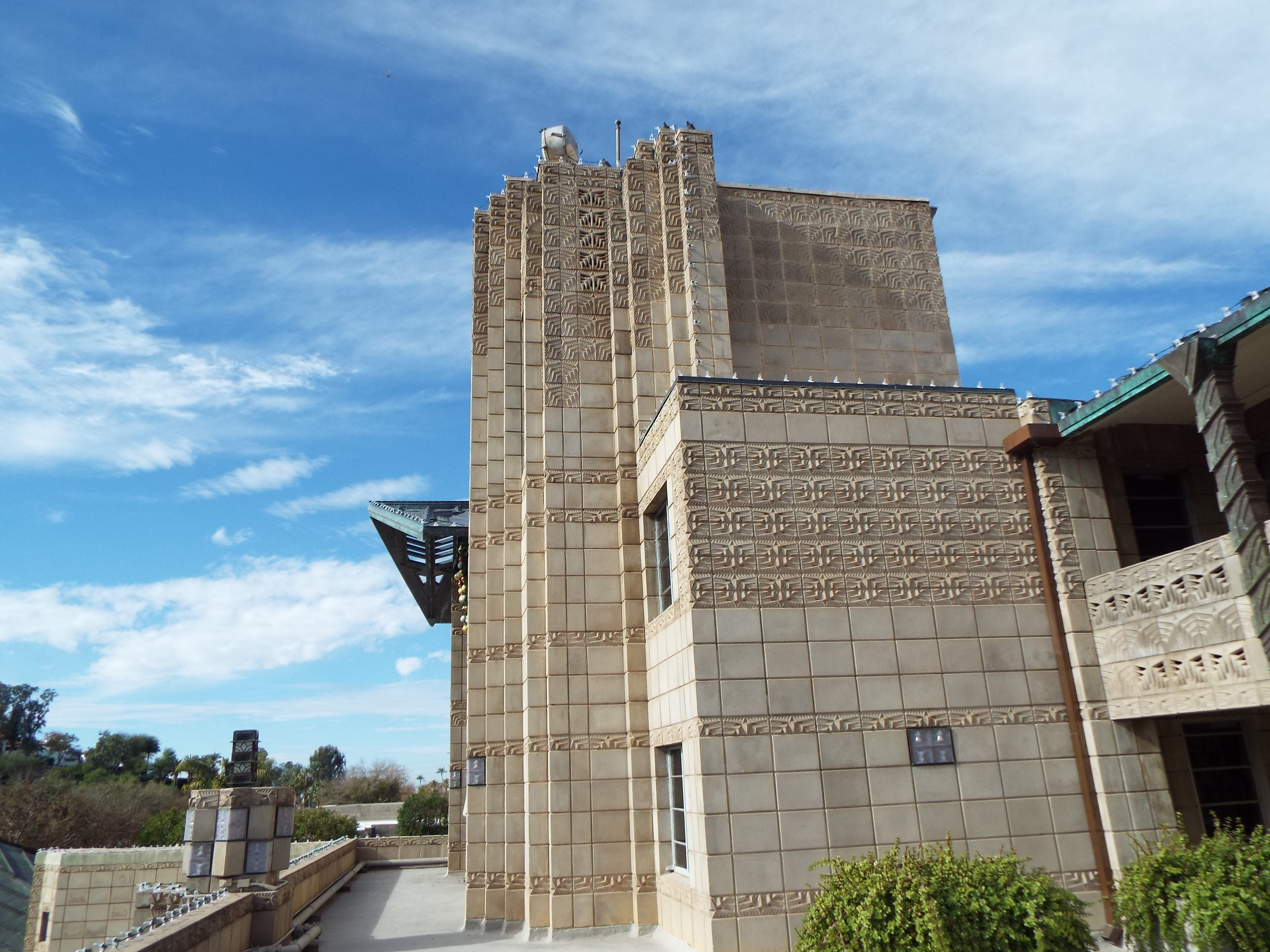
Spotlight on top of the hotel tower

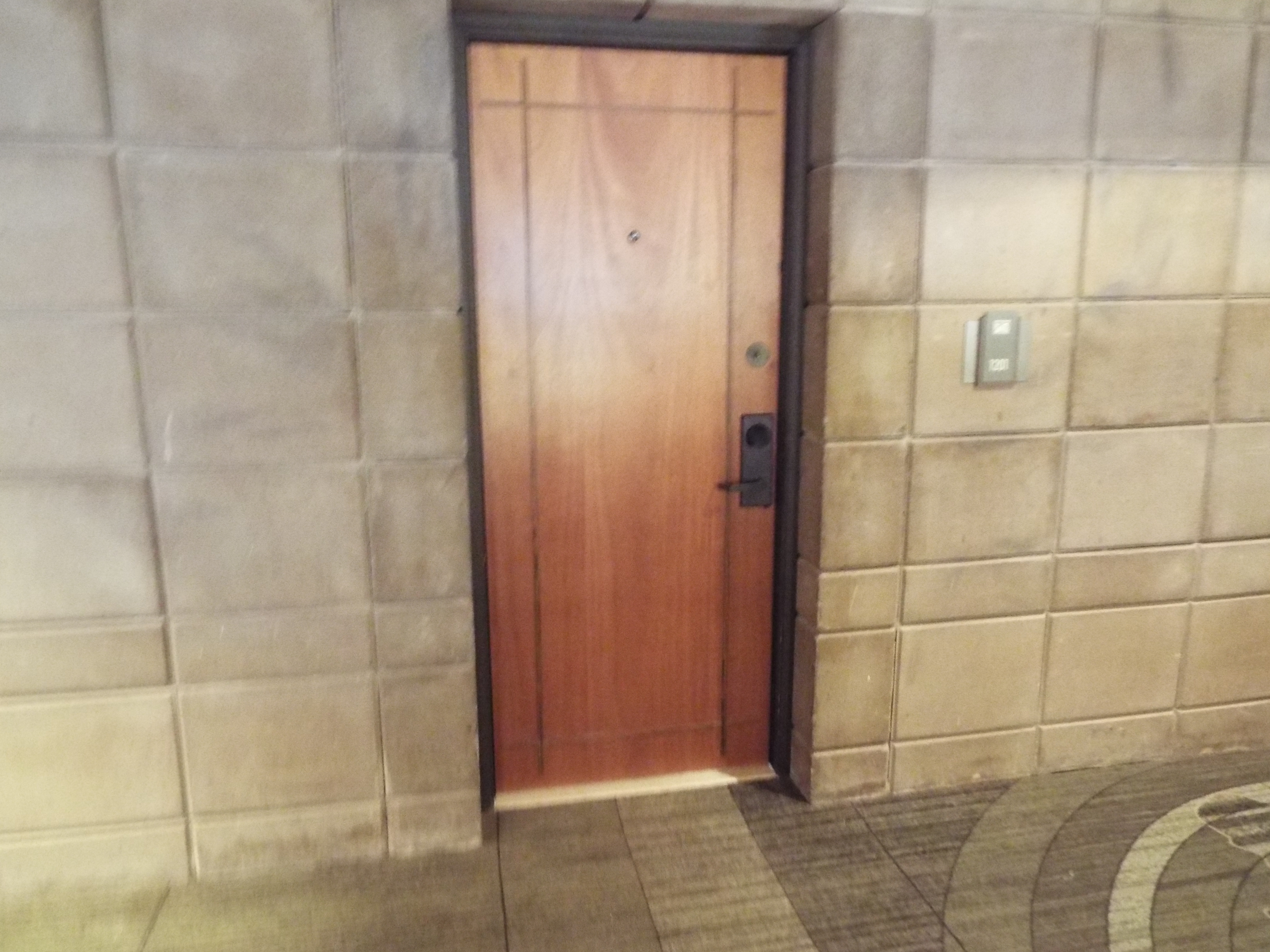
Room 1201, Clark Gables room.

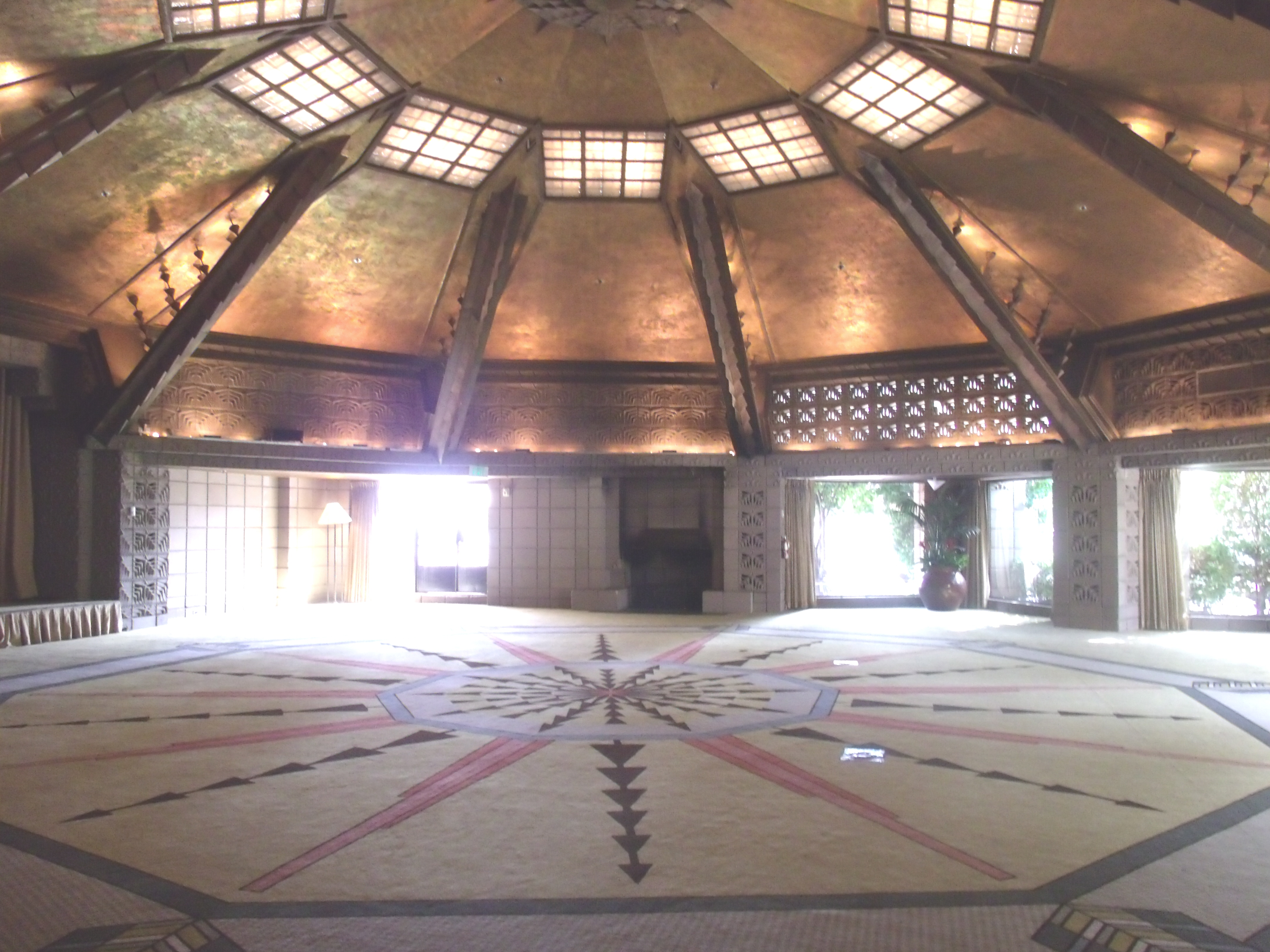
Inside the Arizona Biltmore Hotel Aztec Room.

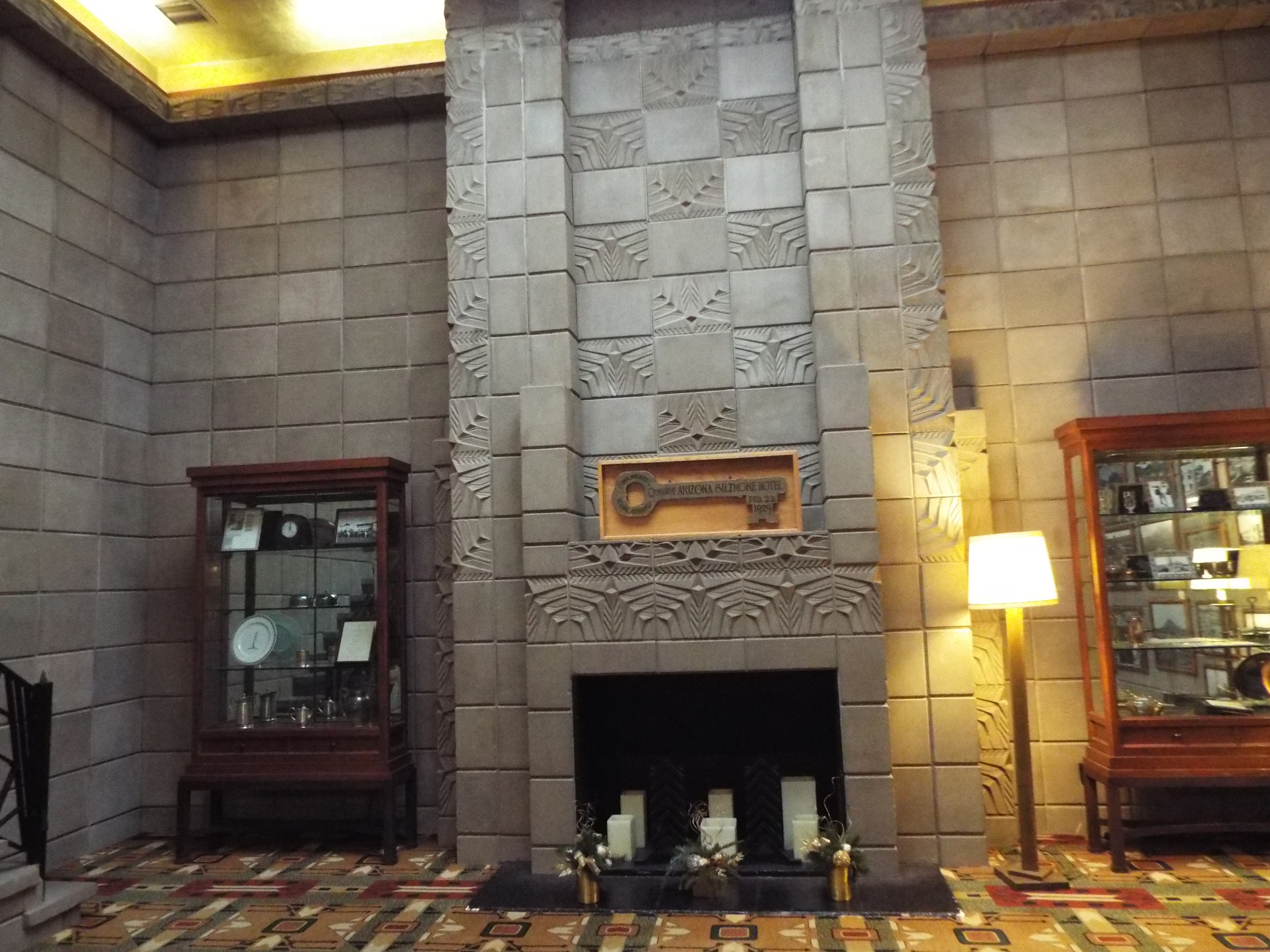
Inside the Biltmore History Room

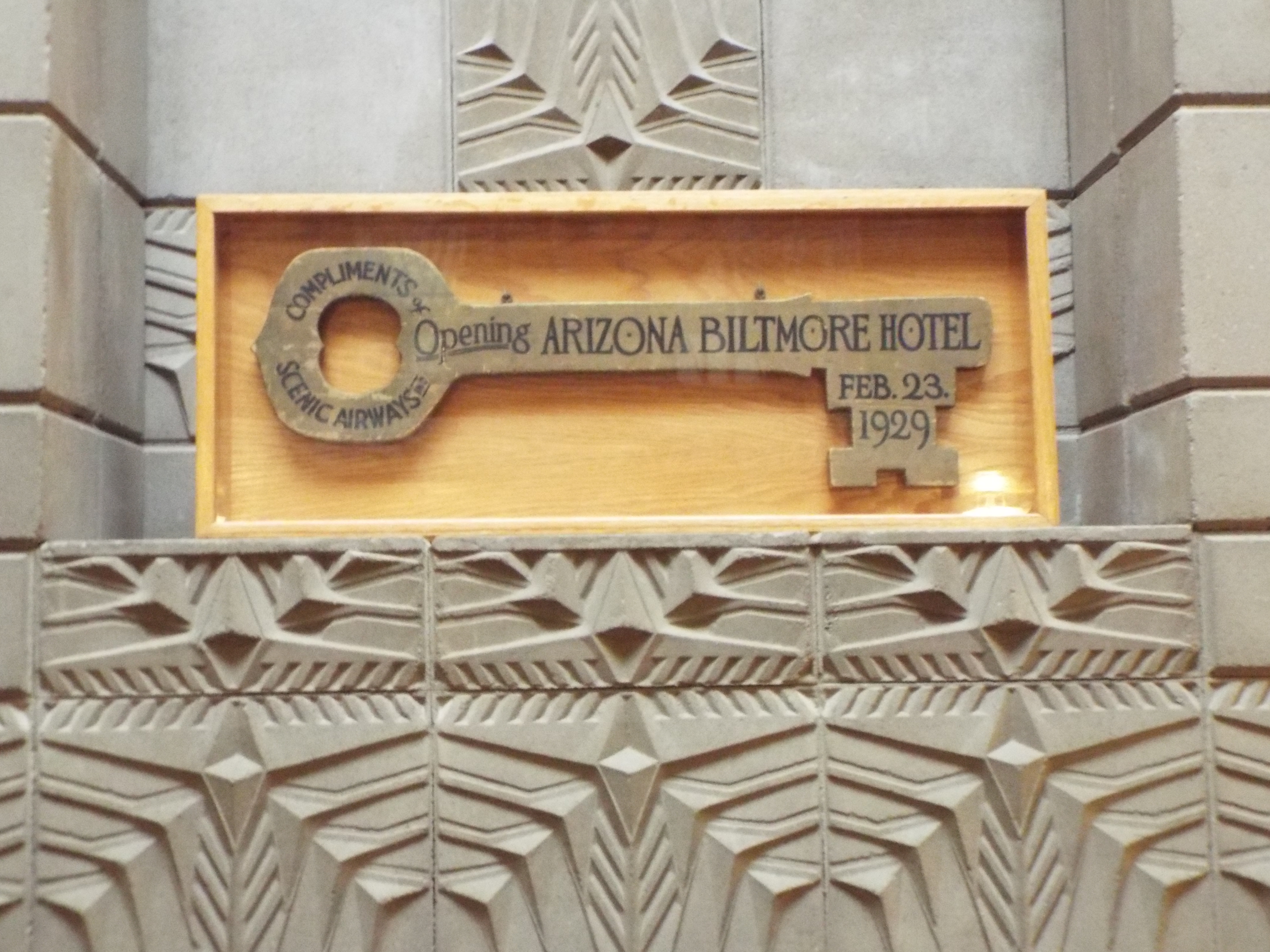
The Wooden key on display above the fireplace in the History Room.

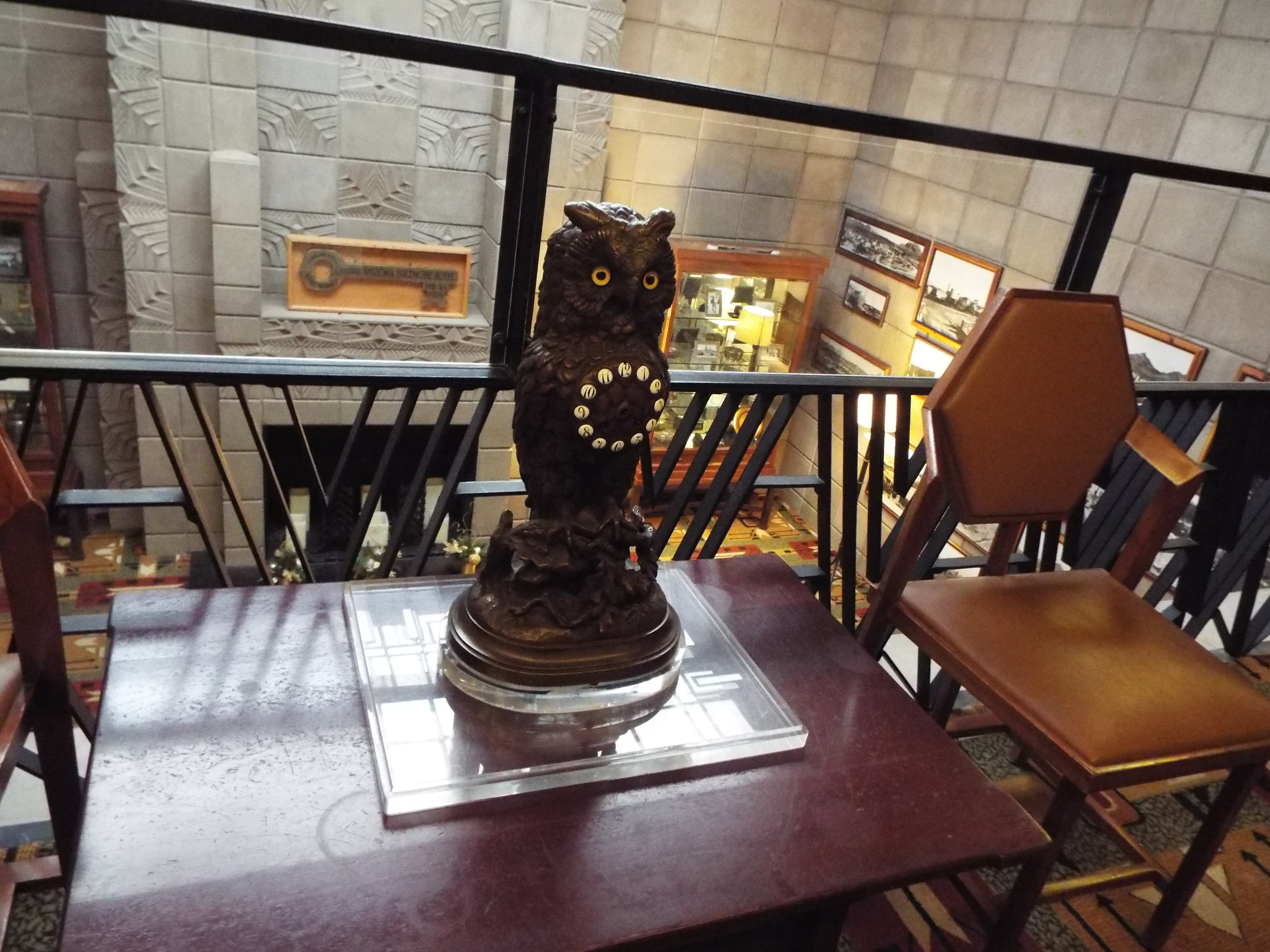
Furnishings inside the Biltmore History Room.

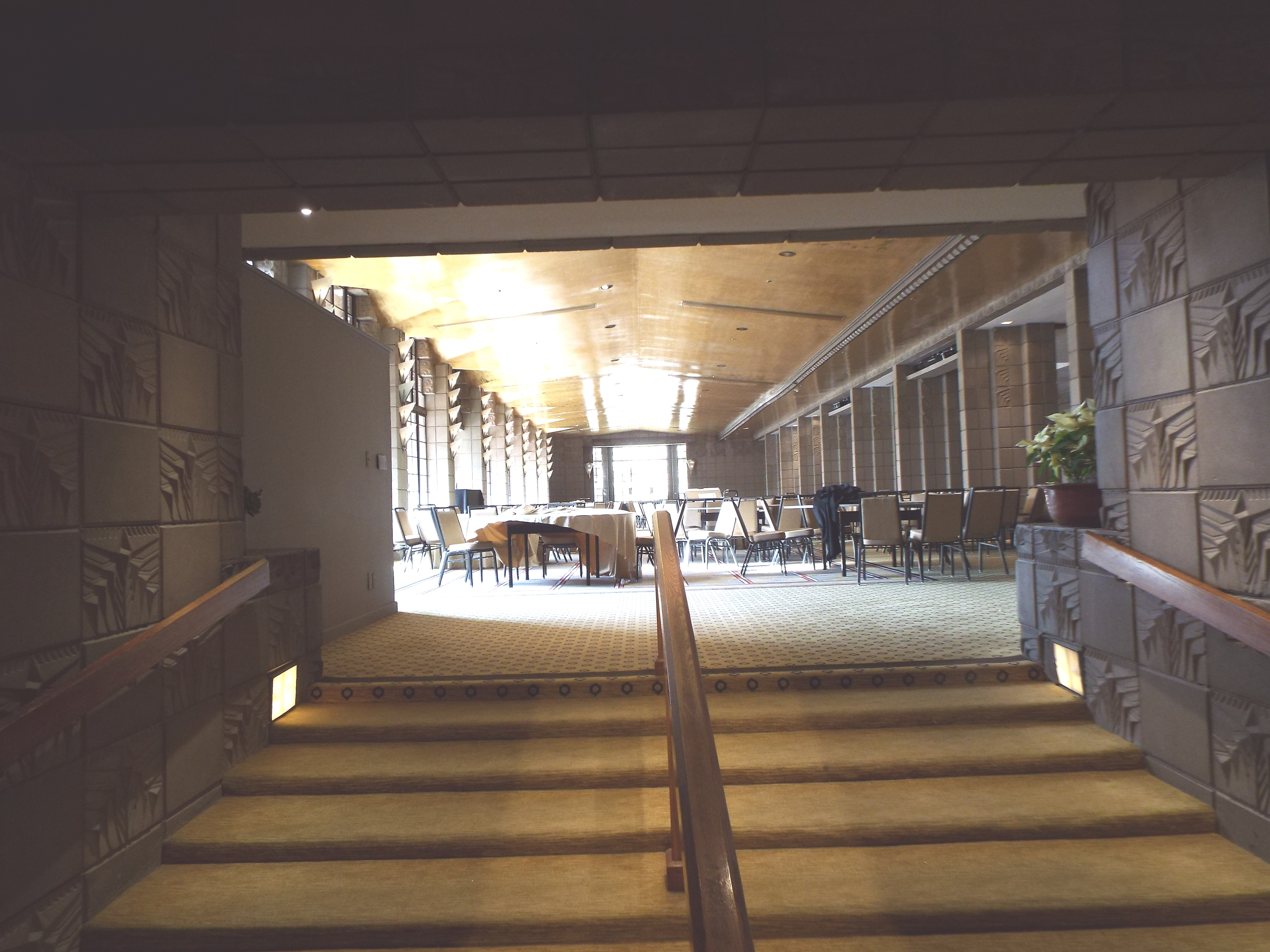
The Gold Room.

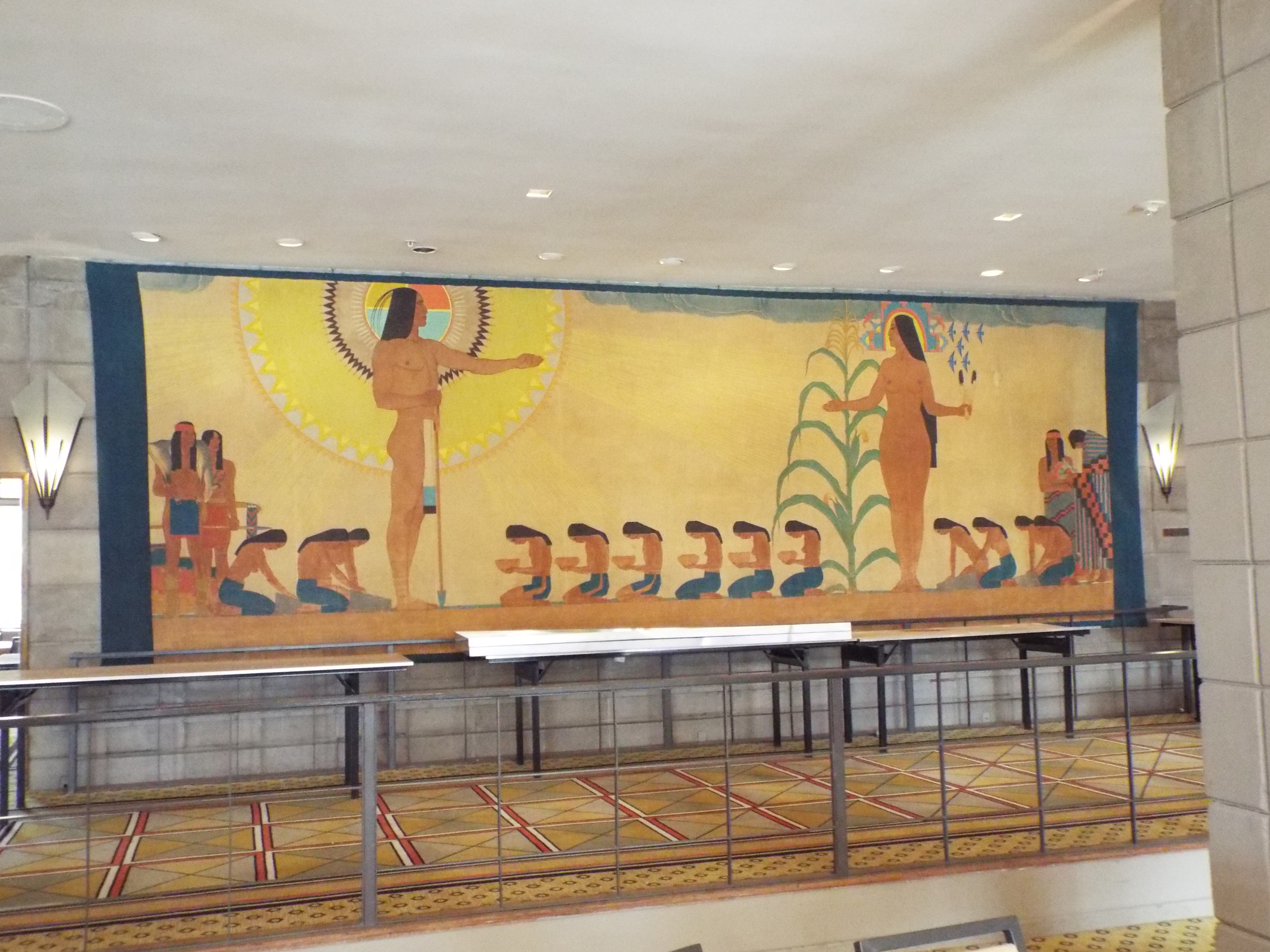
The "Legend of the Sun" painting.

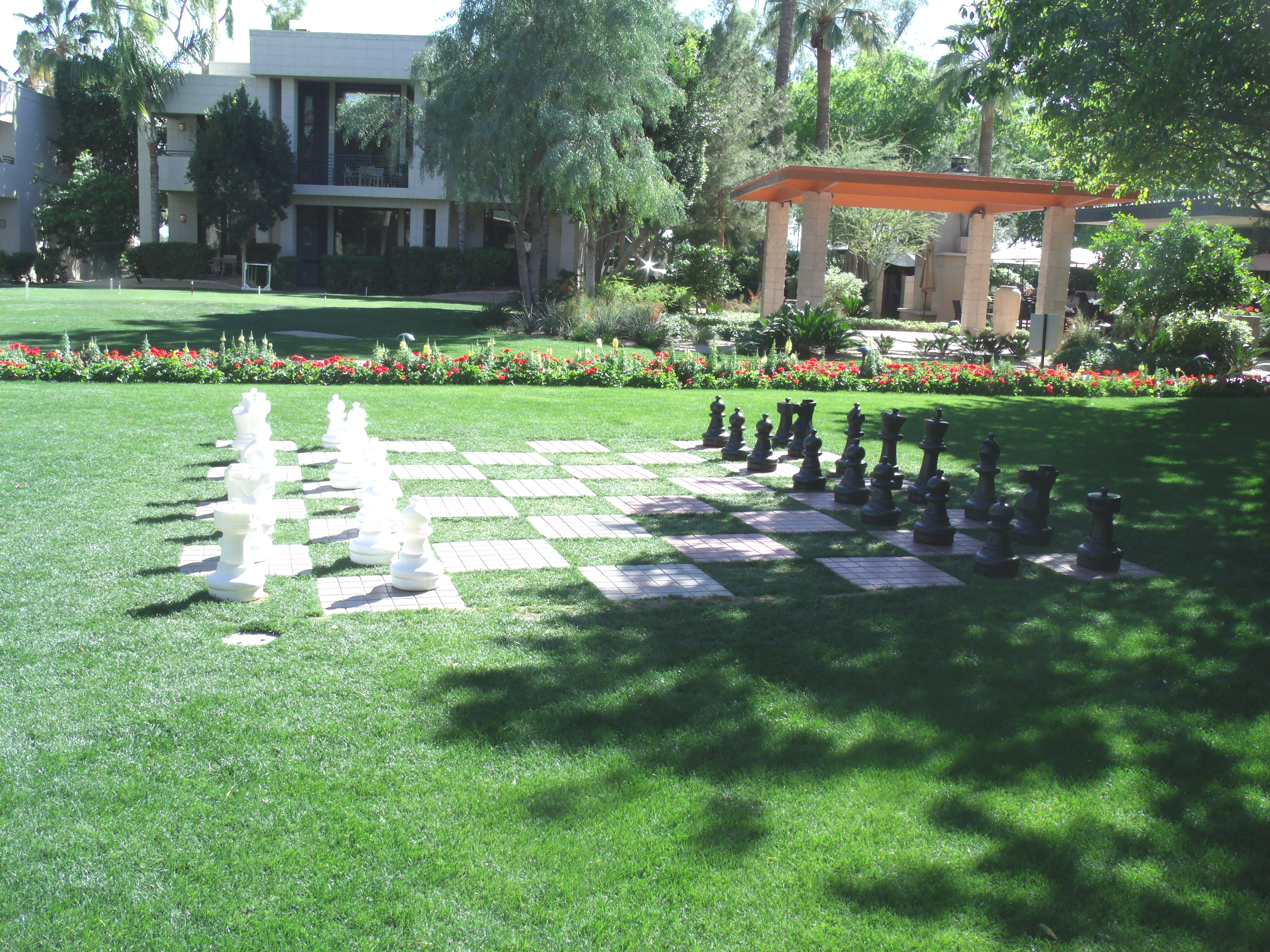
Large chess board on the grounds of the Arizona Biltmore Hotel. According to the Arizona Biltmore Hotel historians, American actress Martha Raye played there.

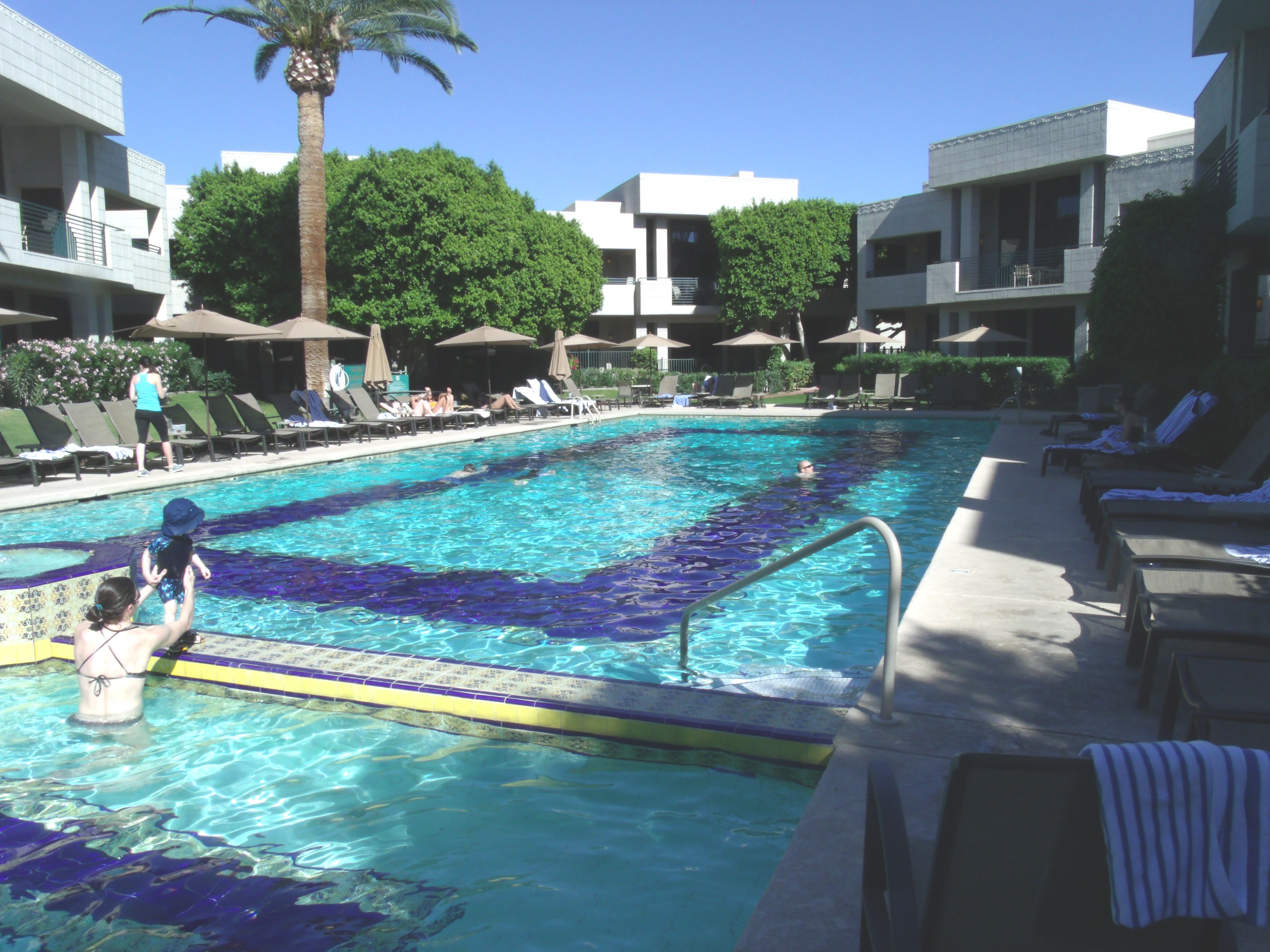
The Arizona Biltmore Hotel Catalina Pool was built in the 1930s. The pool was often used by actress Marilyn Monroe and allegedly the site where American composer Irving Berlin wrote "White Christmas".

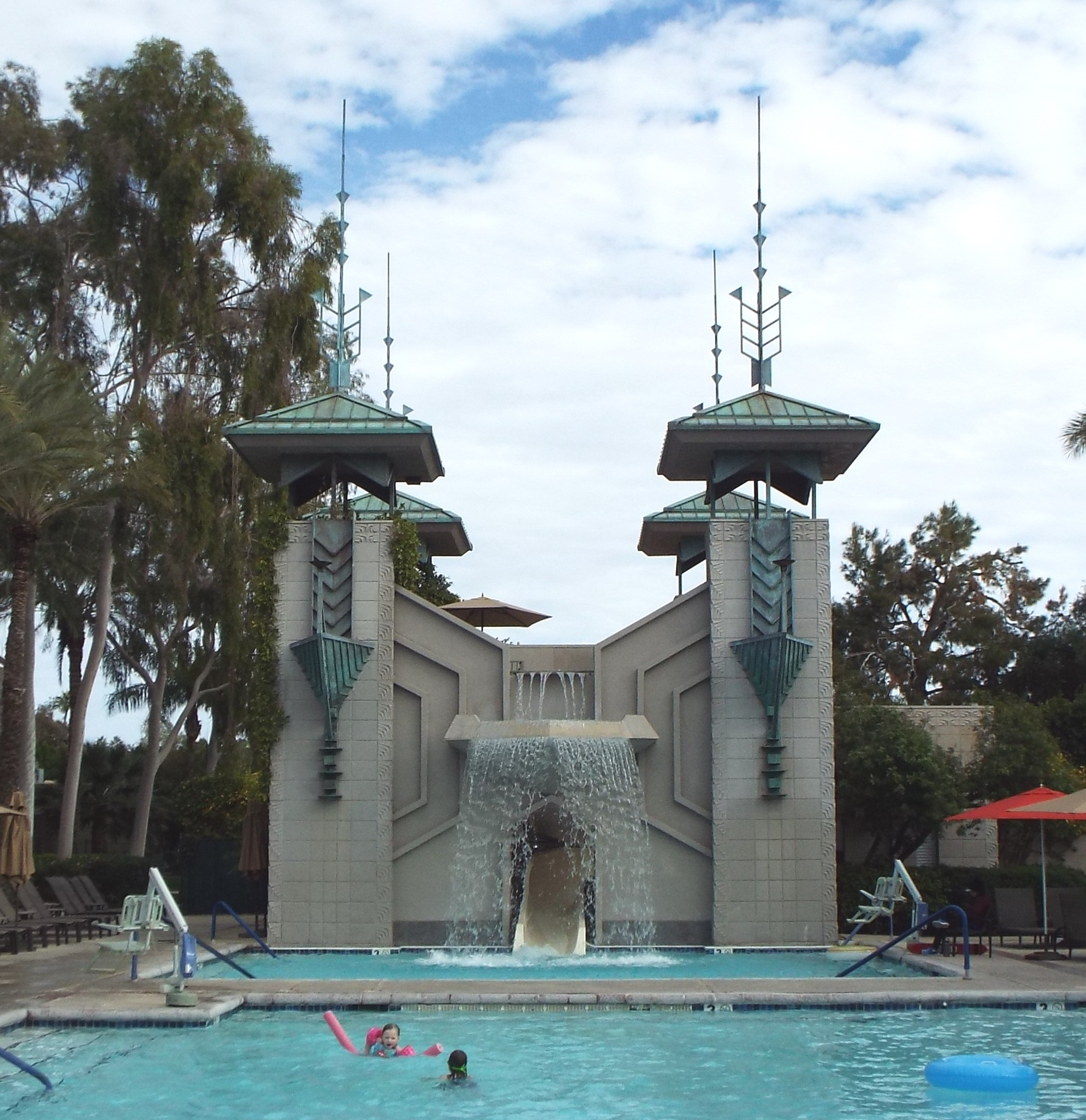
Paradise Pool three story water slide

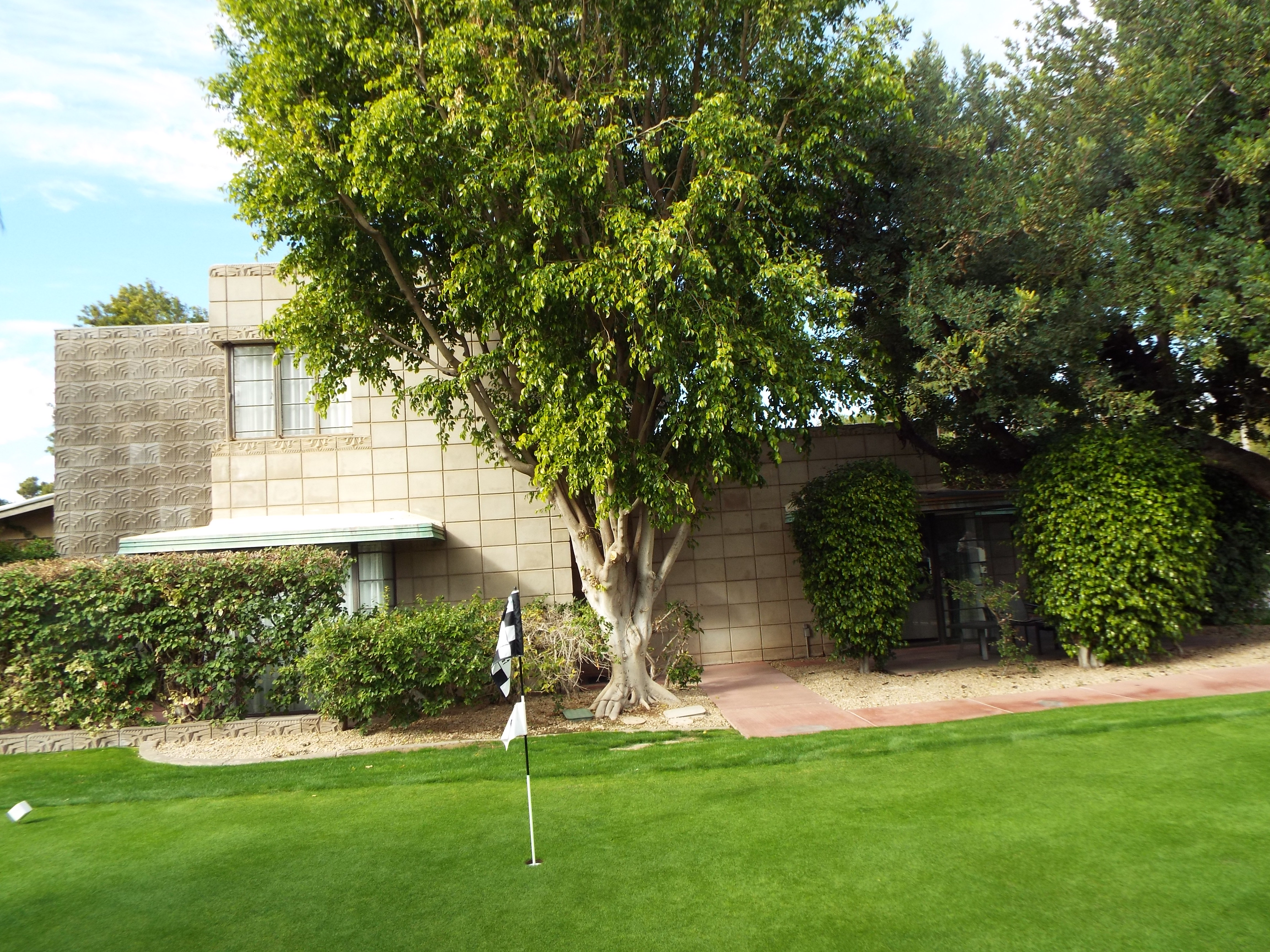
The Reagan honeymoon cottage, Cottage I.

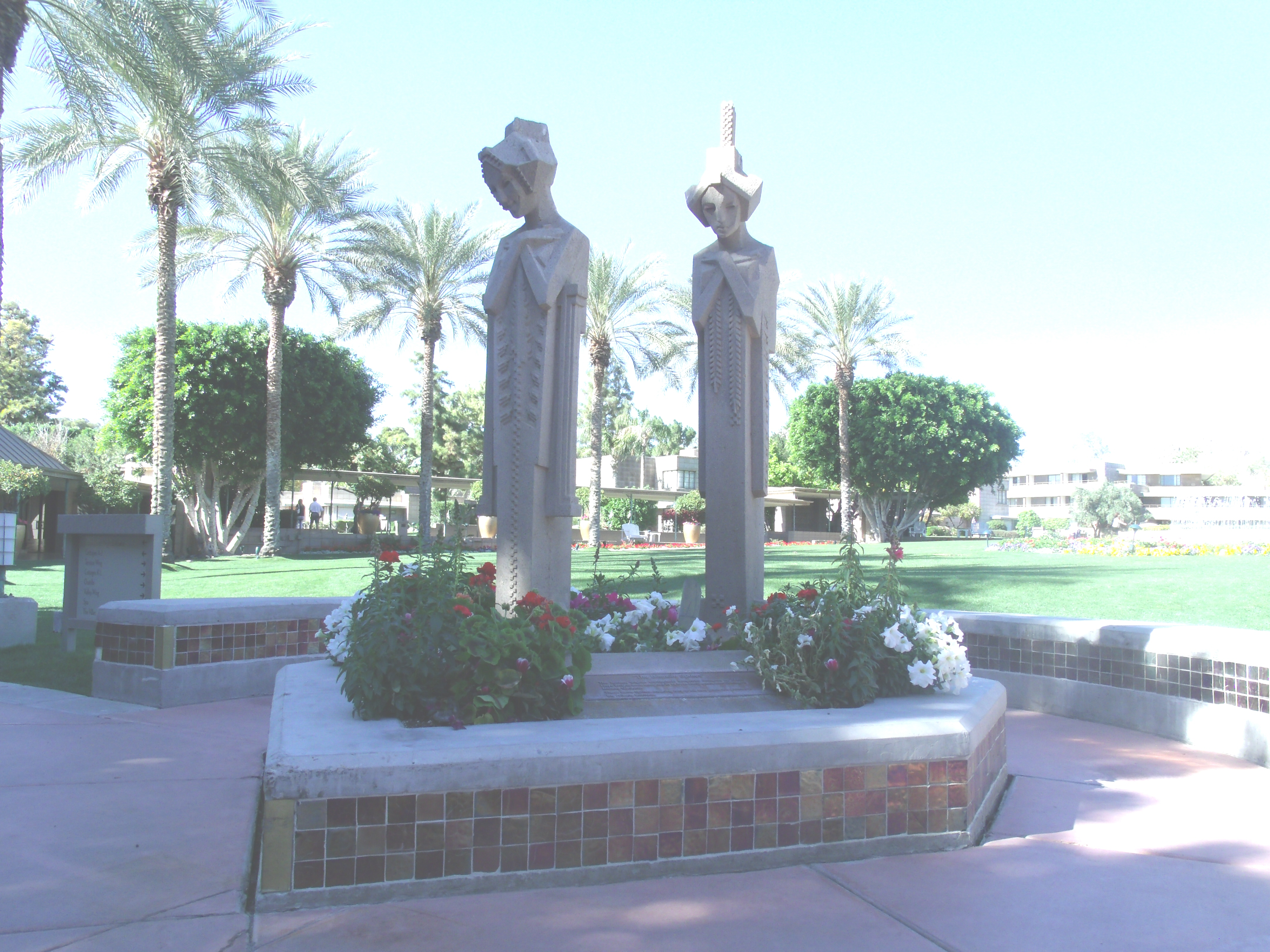
The Frank Lloyd Wright "Sprites" are statues that were made in 1914 and adorned the Midway Gardens in Chicago. After World War II, the "Sprites" were in a state of abandonment and in pieces. They were restored and became part of the adornment of the Arizona Biltmore Hotel gardens in 1985.

=== Arizona State Capitol Museum ===
Arizona State Capitol Museum
Listed in the National Register of Historic Places

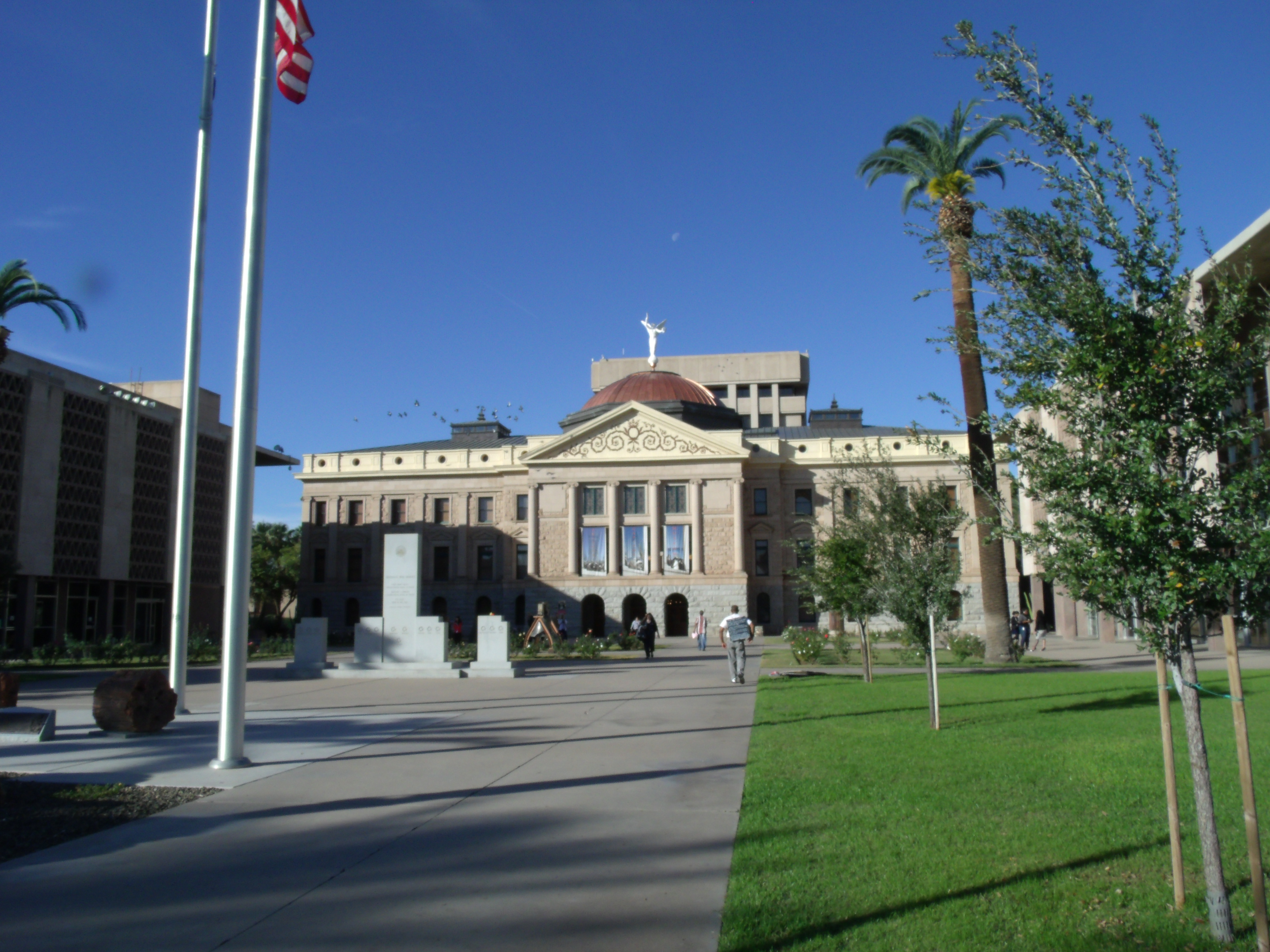
The Arizona State Capitol built in 1901 is now the Arizona State Capitol Museum.

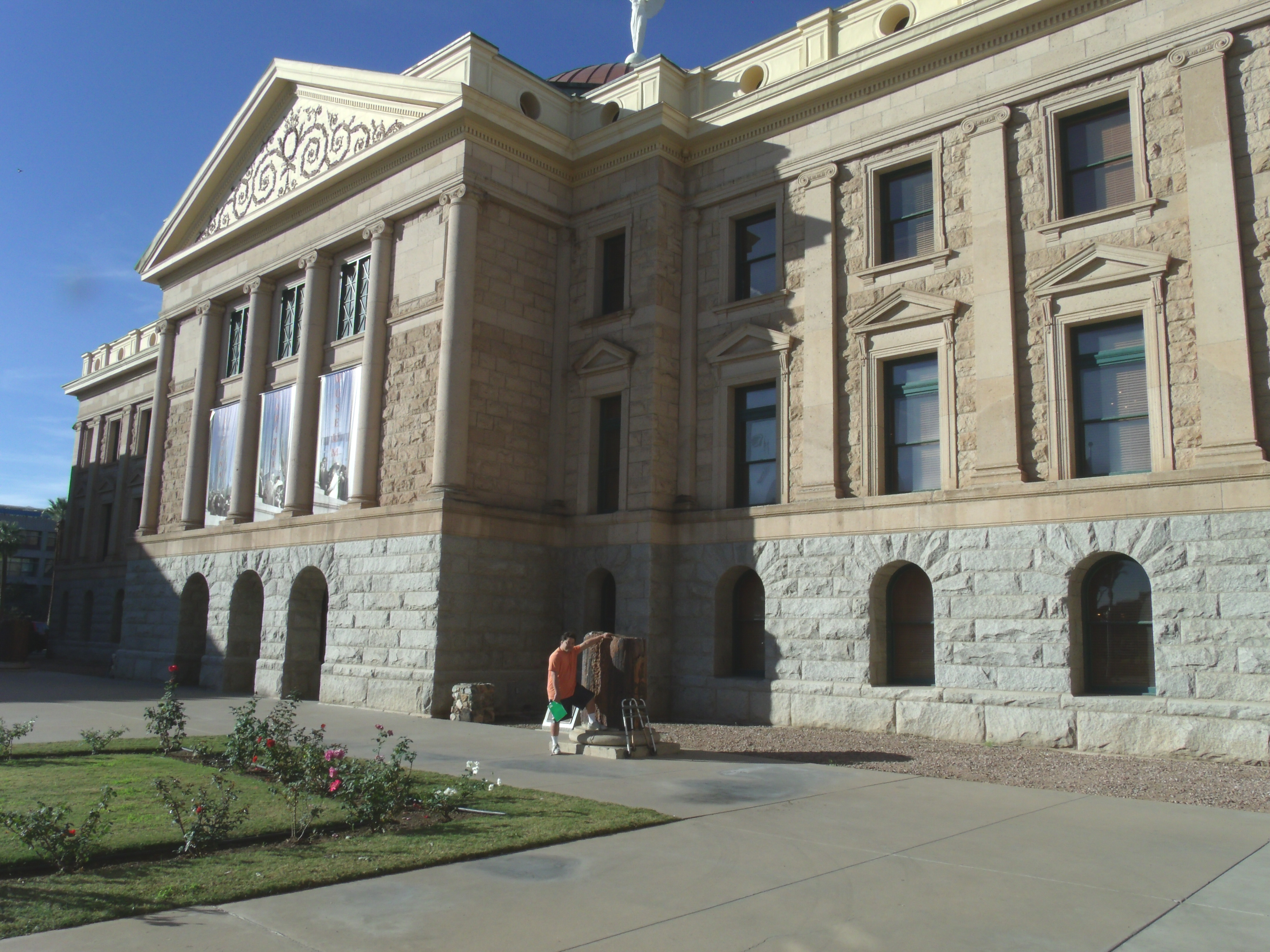
Another view of the Arizona State Capitol built in 1901 which is now the Arizona State Capital Museum.

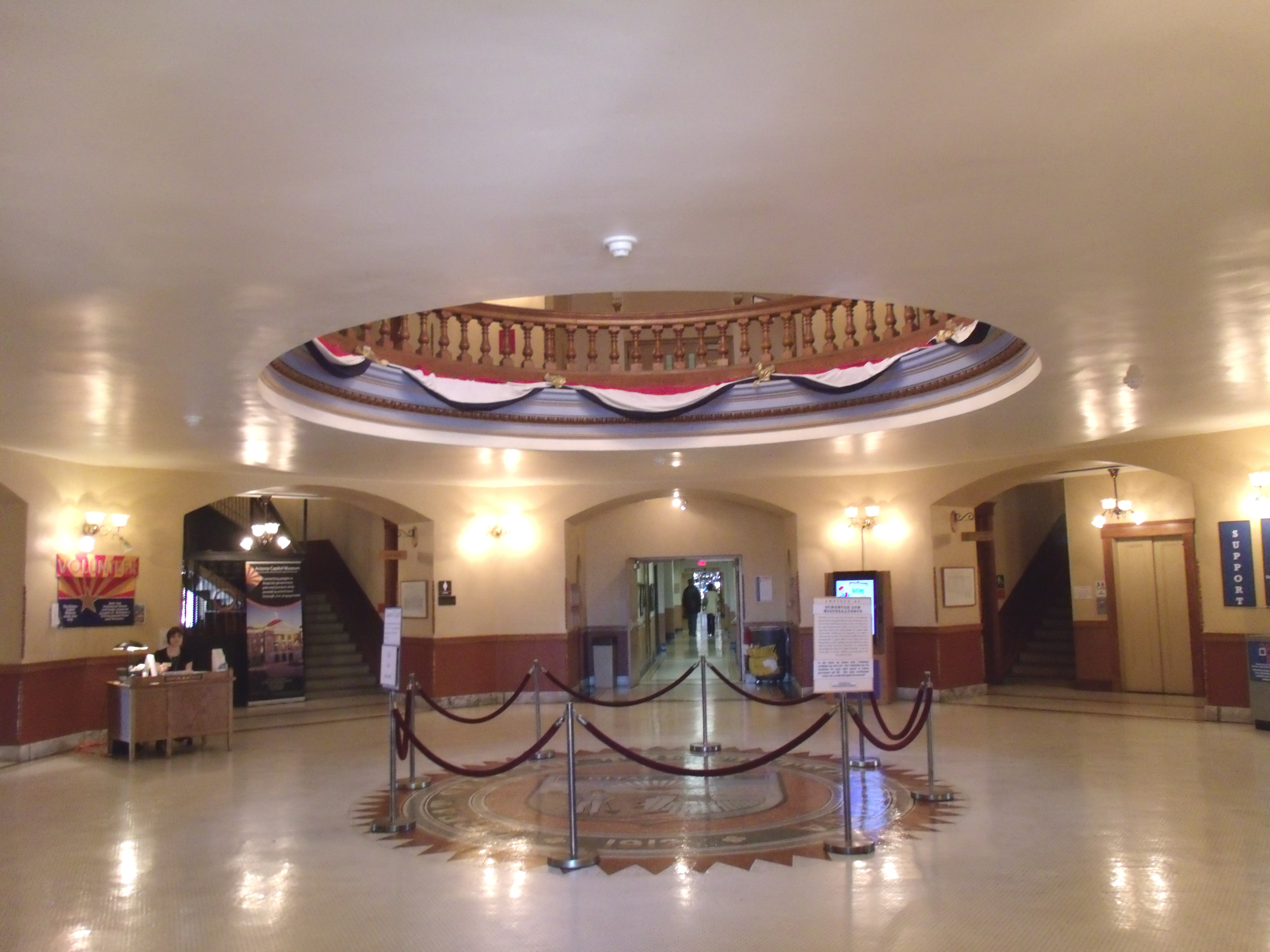
The rotunda floor of the Arizona State Capitol Building.

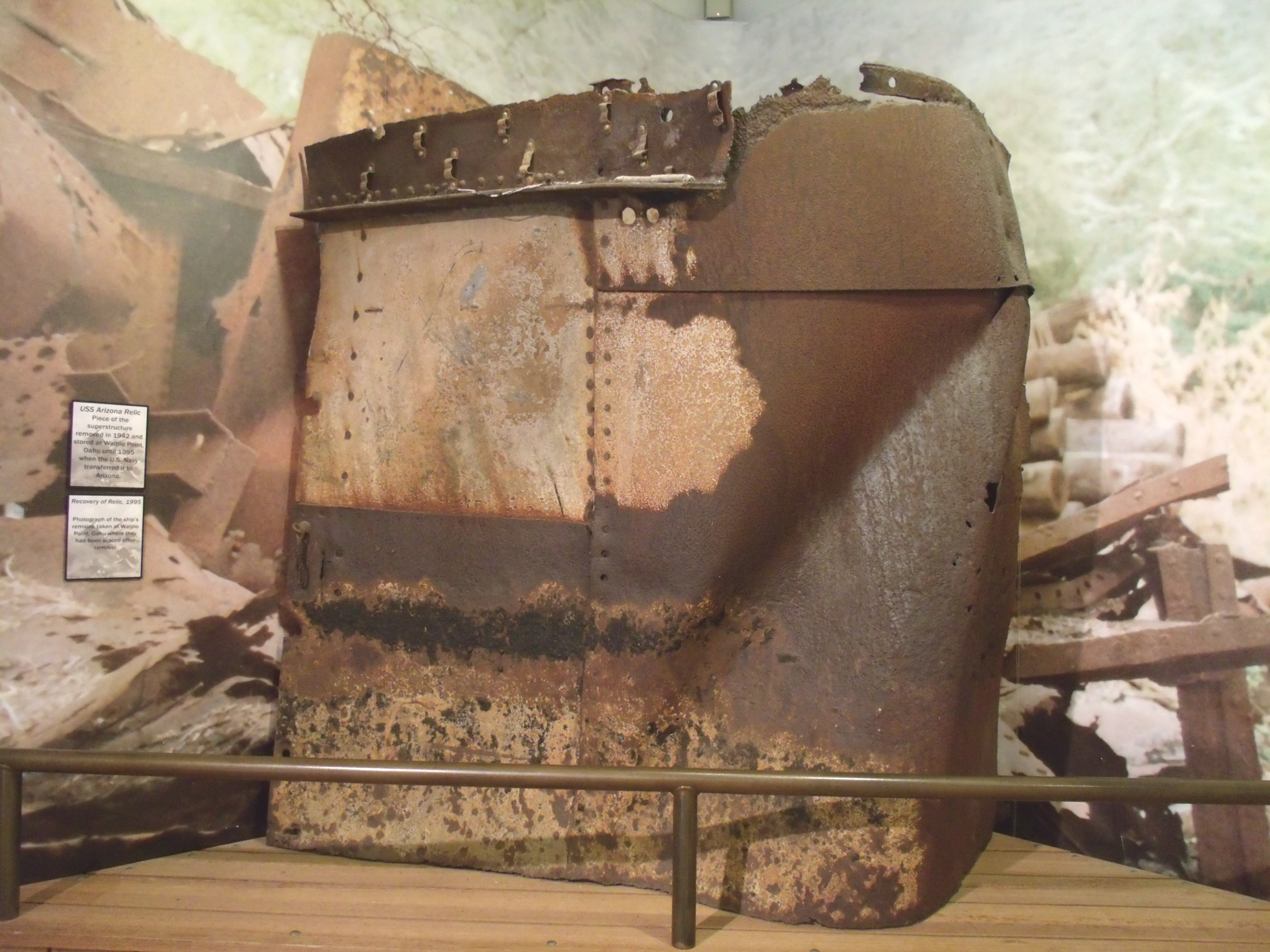
Part of the USS Arizona superstructure which was salvaged and which is on display at the Arizona State Capitol Museum.

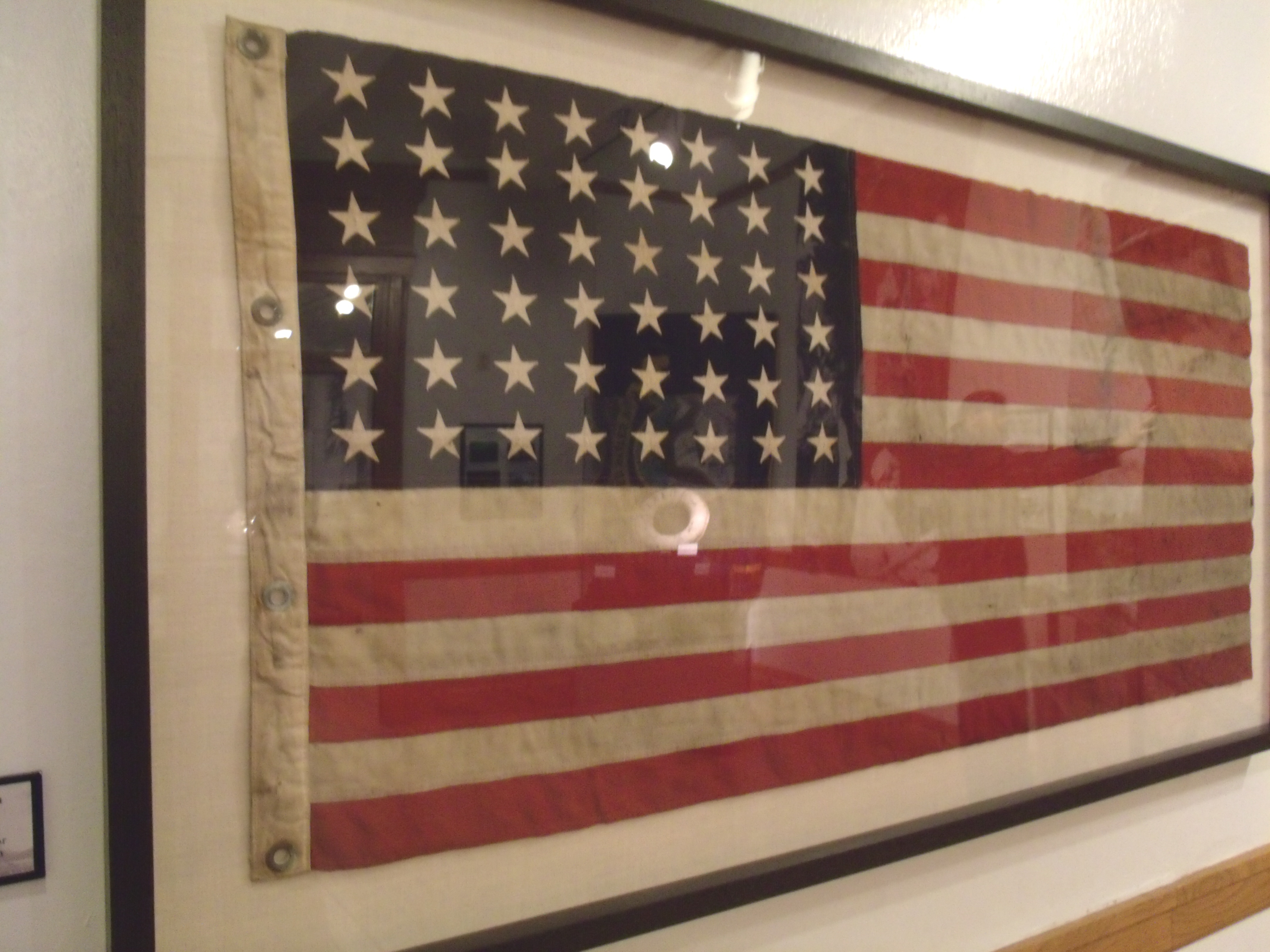
The U.S. flag that flew on the battleship USS Arizona when it sank during the Pearl Harbor. The flag is on display in the first floor of the Arizona State Capitol Museum.

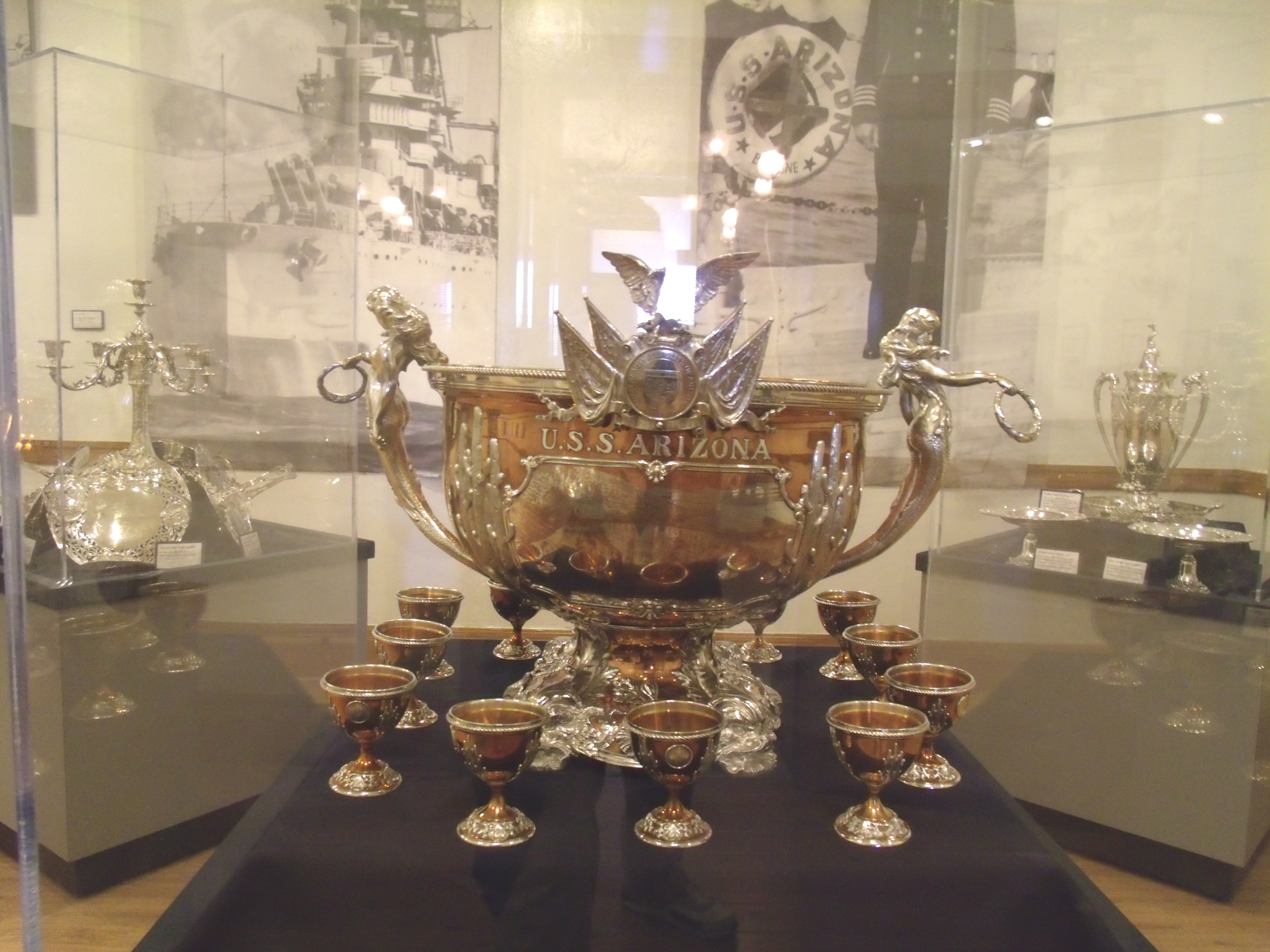
The Arizona Capitol Museum is home to the silver service (silverware) that was donated to the USS Arizona by the citizens of Arizona in 1919. This service is composed of 59 distinct pieces on display at the Capitol Museum.

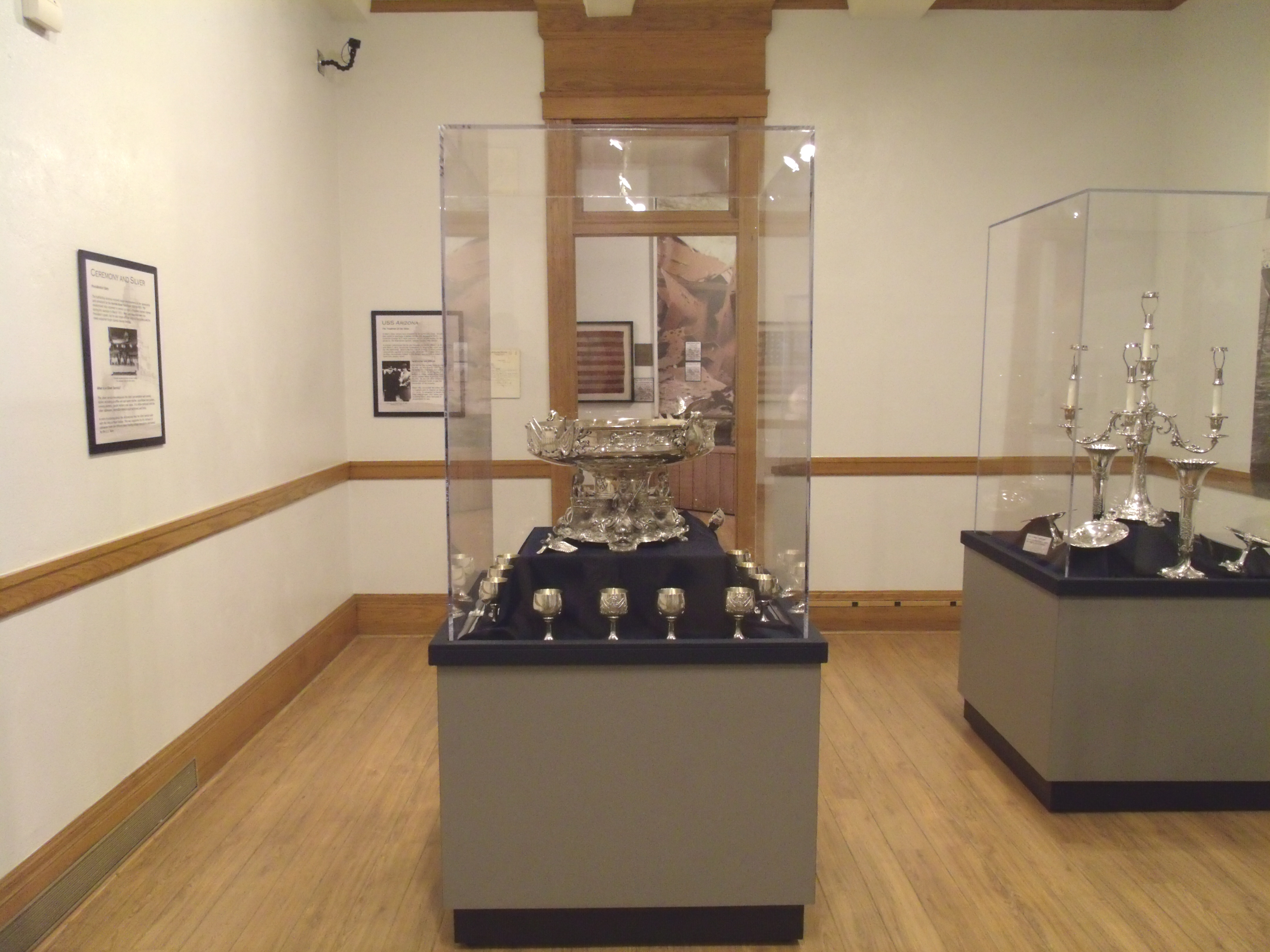
Additional silver service (silverware) that was donated to the USS Arizona by the citizens of Arizona in 1919. on display at the Arizona Capitol Museum.

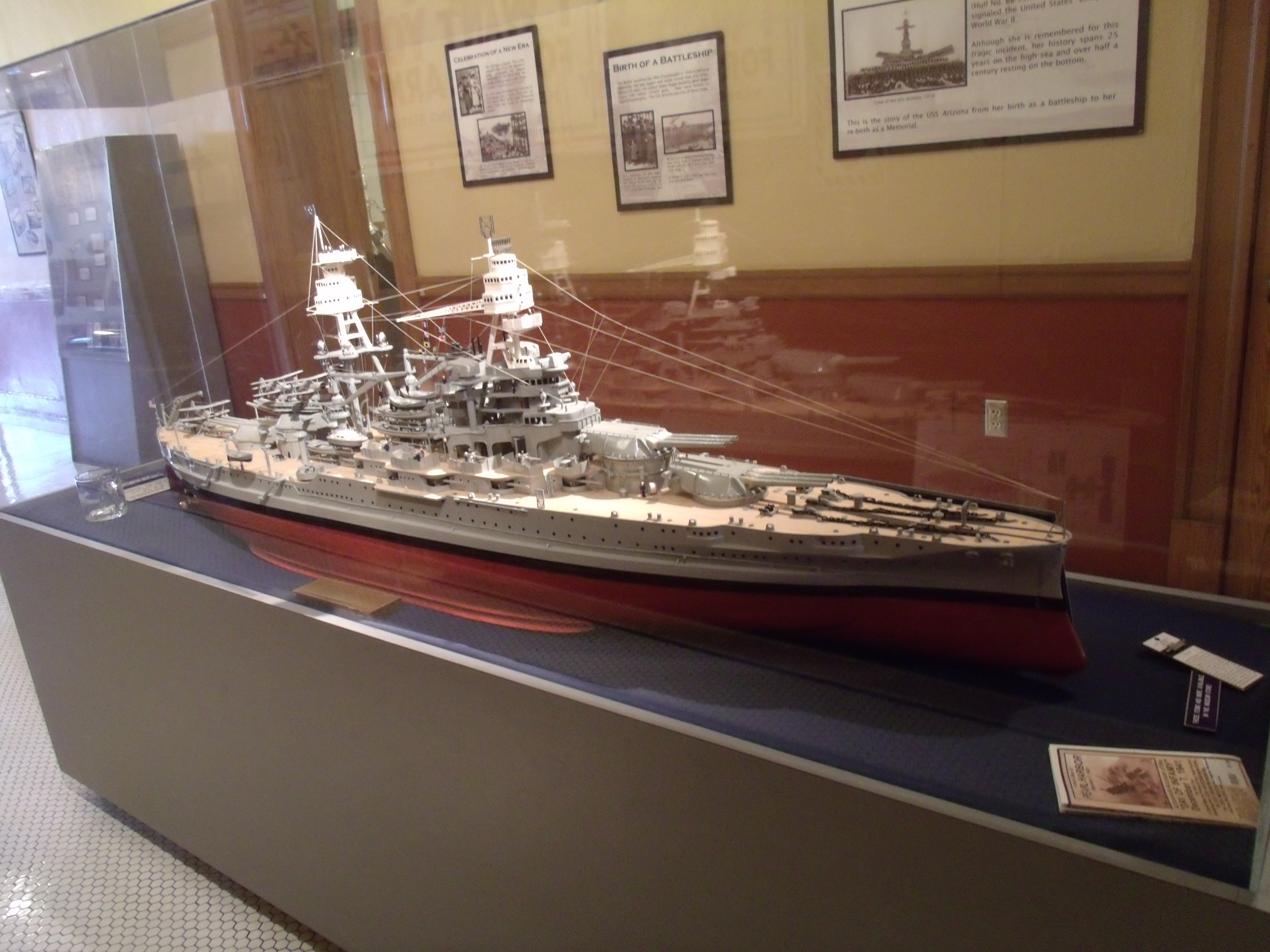
Model of the USS Arizona at the Arizona State Capitol Museum.

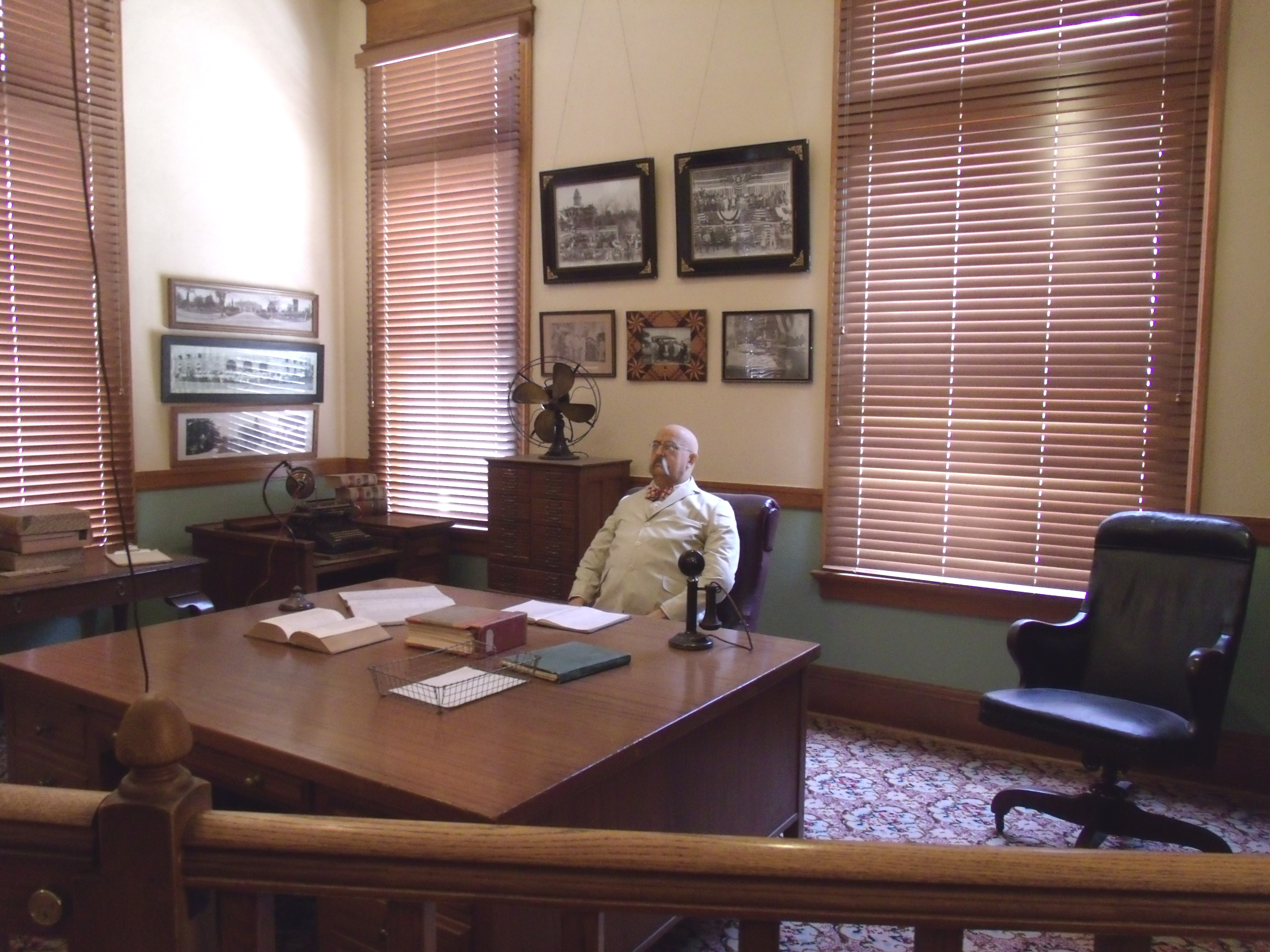
The Governor's office on the second floor has a wax figure of Arizona's First State Governor, George W. P. Hunt.

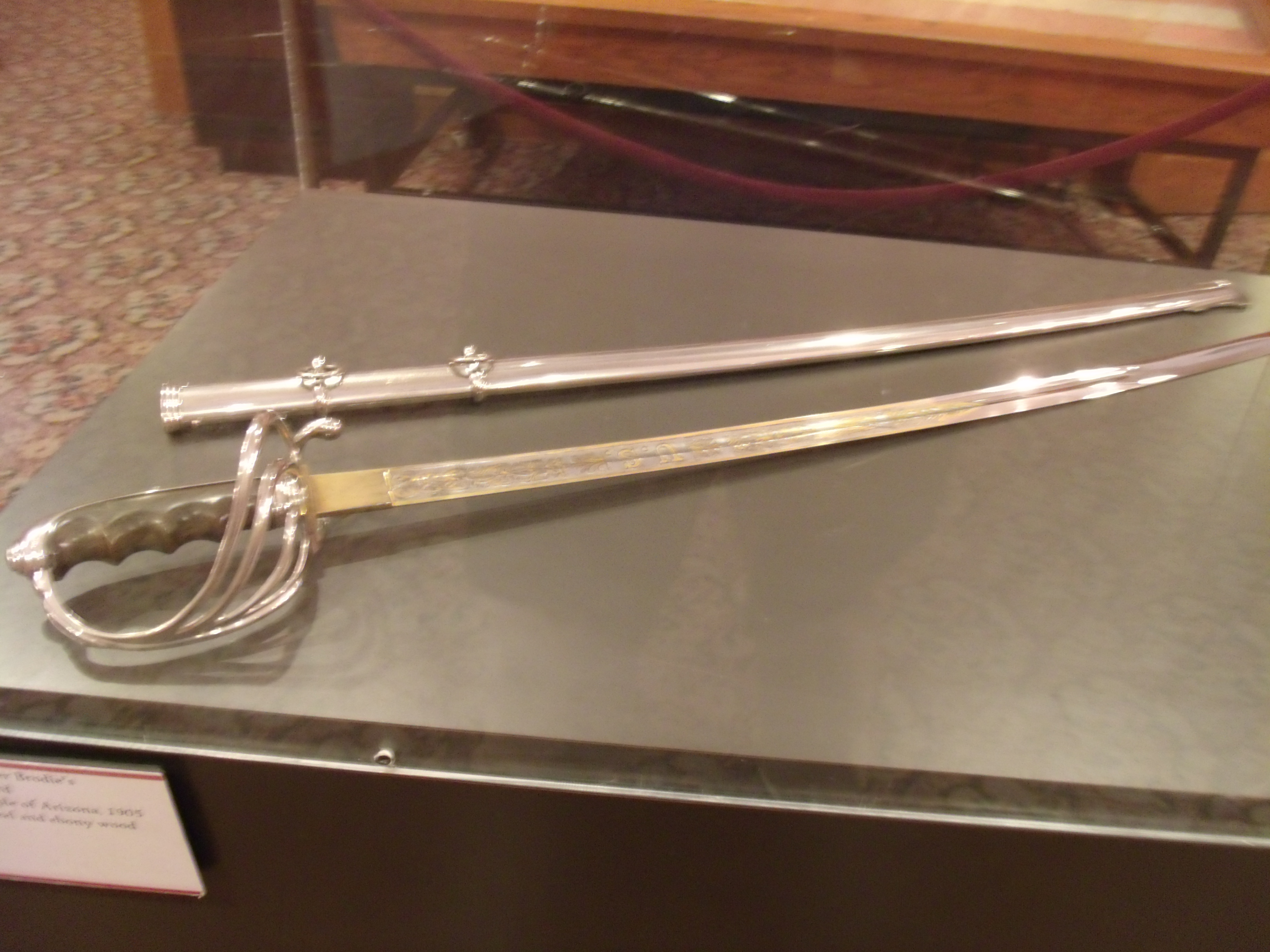
The sword and scabbard which Alexander Oswald Brodie, who served as the Governor of the Territory of Arizona from 1902 to 1905, used during his service with the Rough Riders during the Spanish–American War. The exhibit is located in the second floor of the Arizona State Capitol Museum.

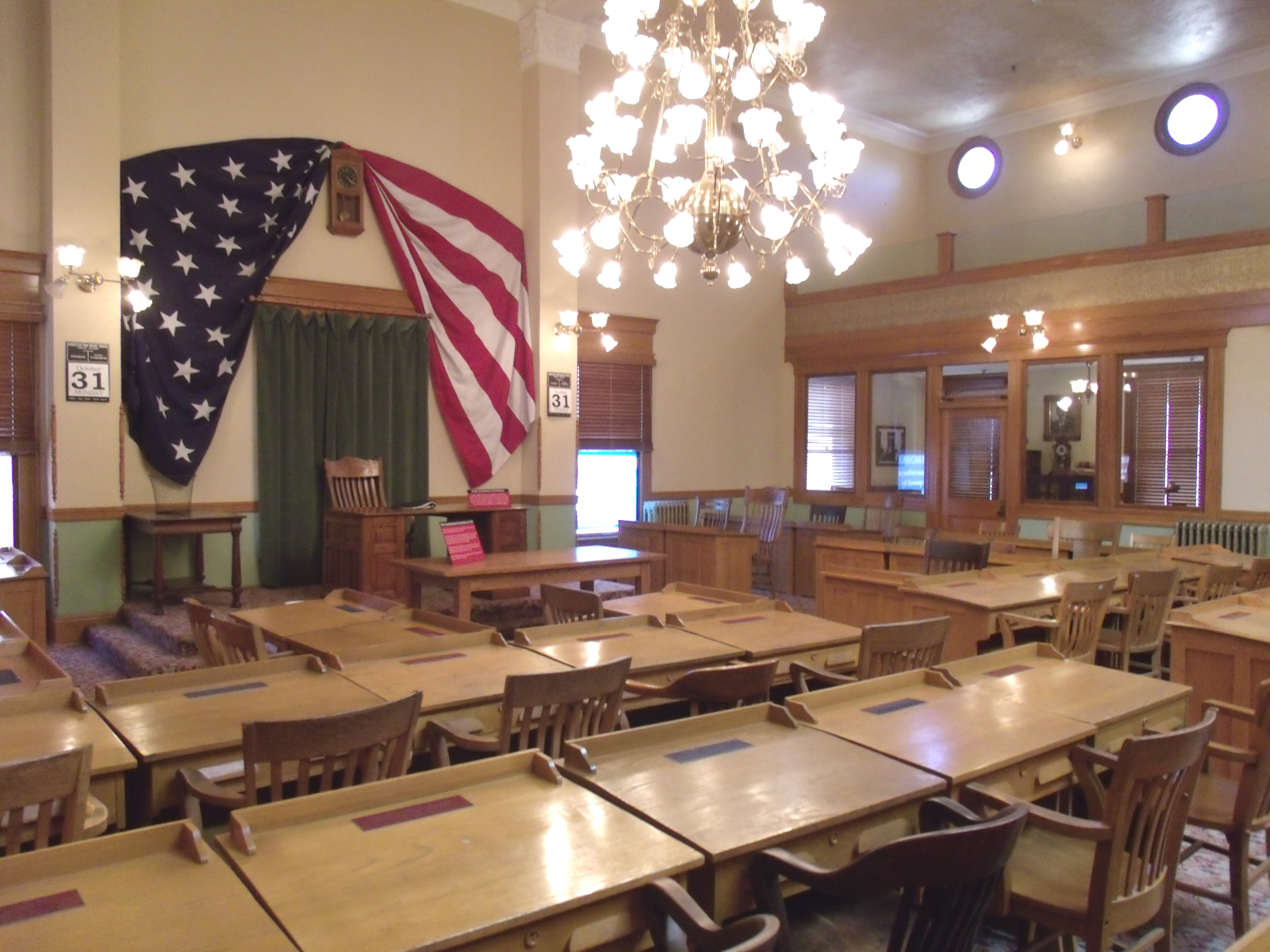
Inside the historic House Chamber. The Chamber is located on the third floor of the Arizona State Capitol Museum.

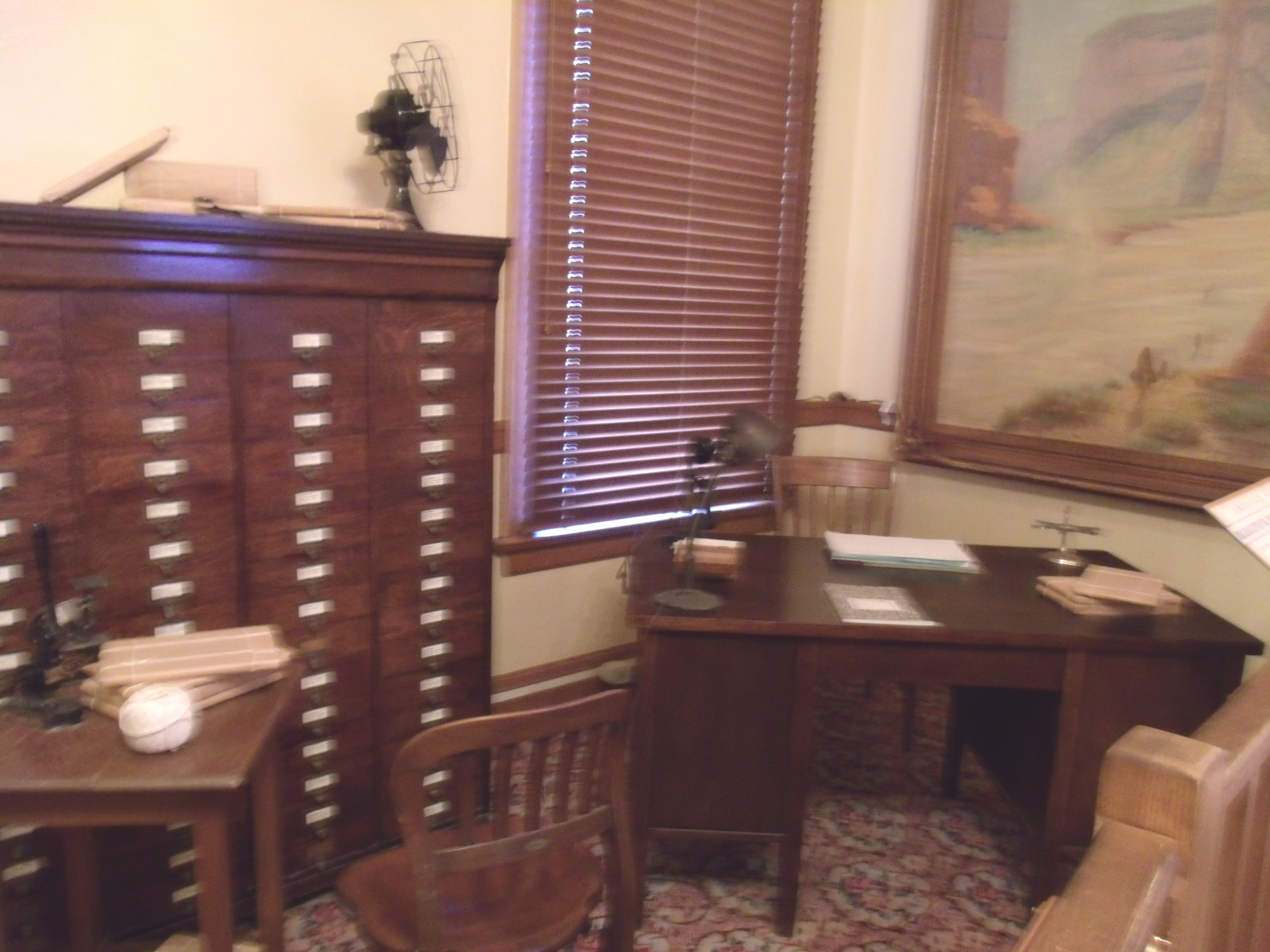
Replica of the original Office of the Secretary of State. The office is located on the third floor of the Arizona State Capitol Museum.

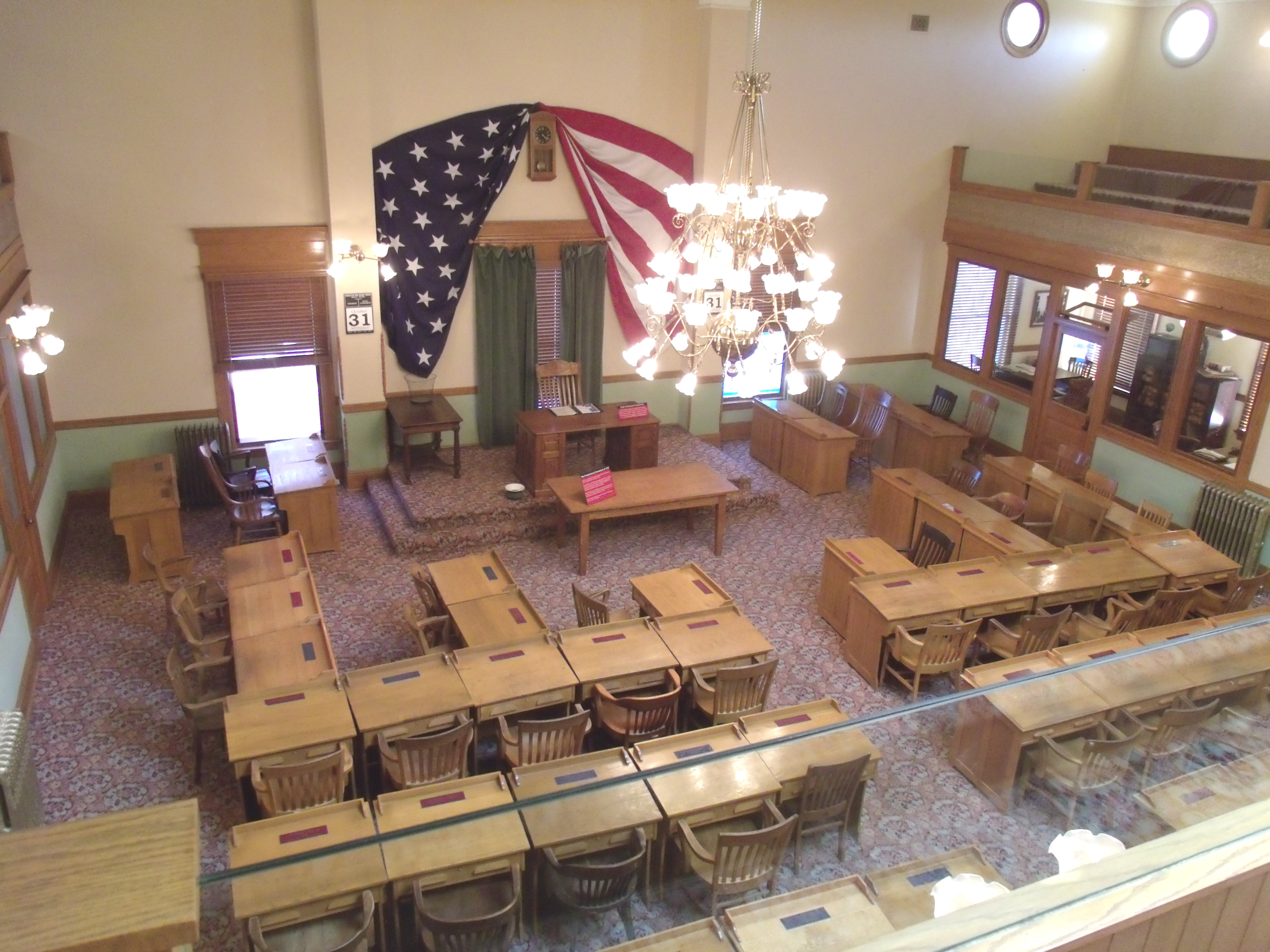
On the fourth floor of the Arizona State Capitol Museum you can look down into the original House Chamber from the gallery.

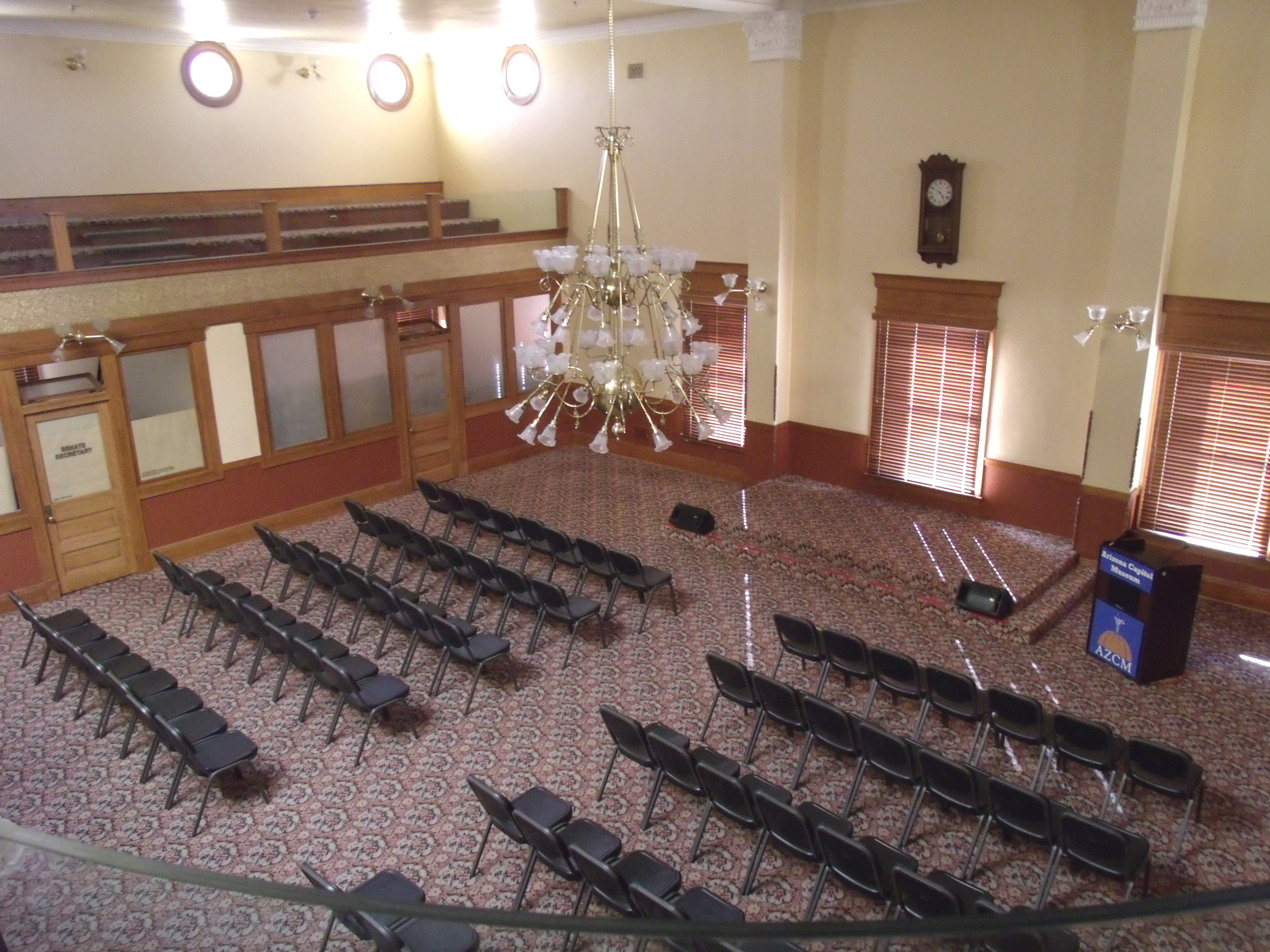
On the fourth floor of the Arizona State Capitol Museum you can look down into the original House of Representatives from the gallery.

=== Bennitt Mansion ===
The Bennitt Mansion
Listed in the National Register of Historic Places

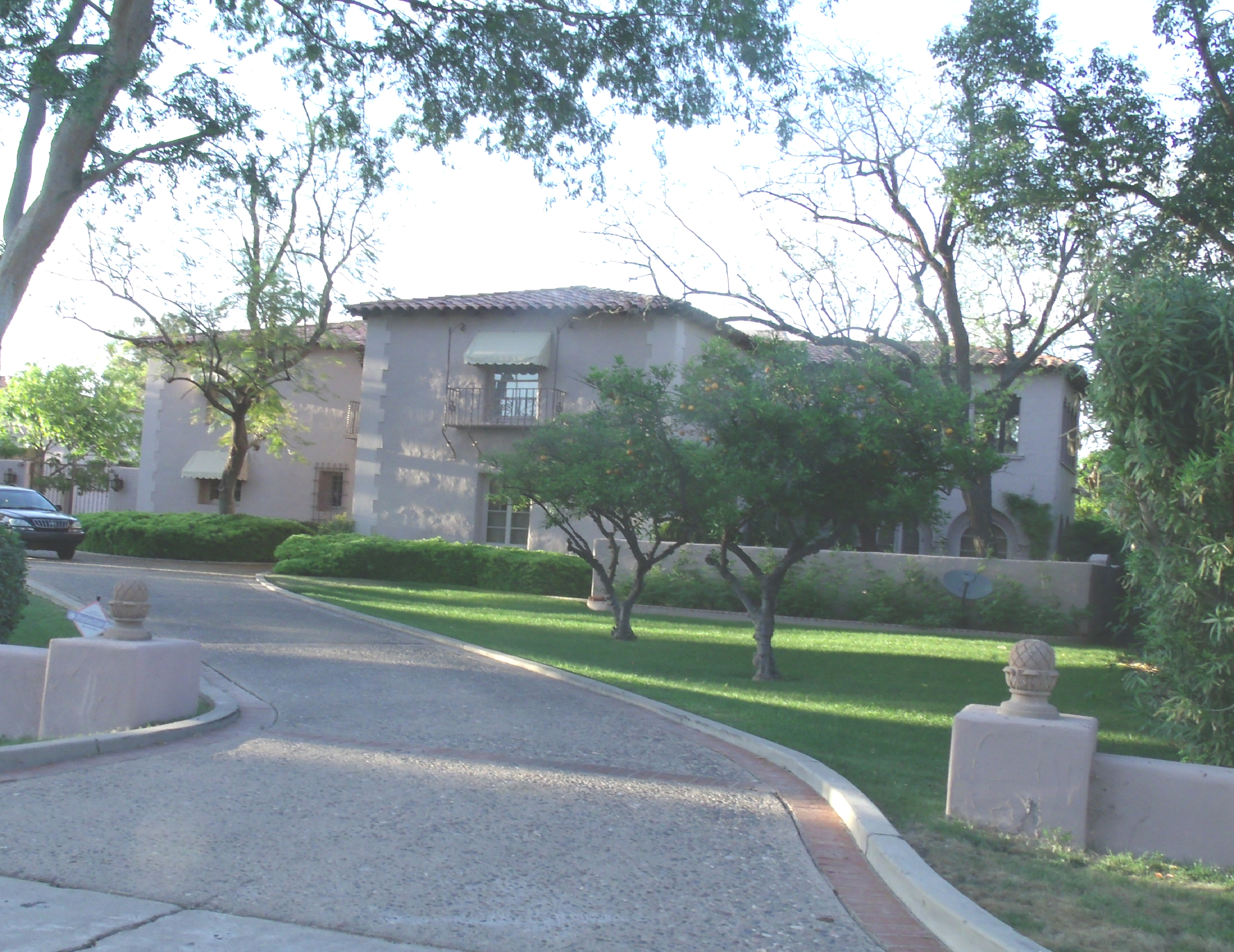
The Bennitt Mansion built in 1928

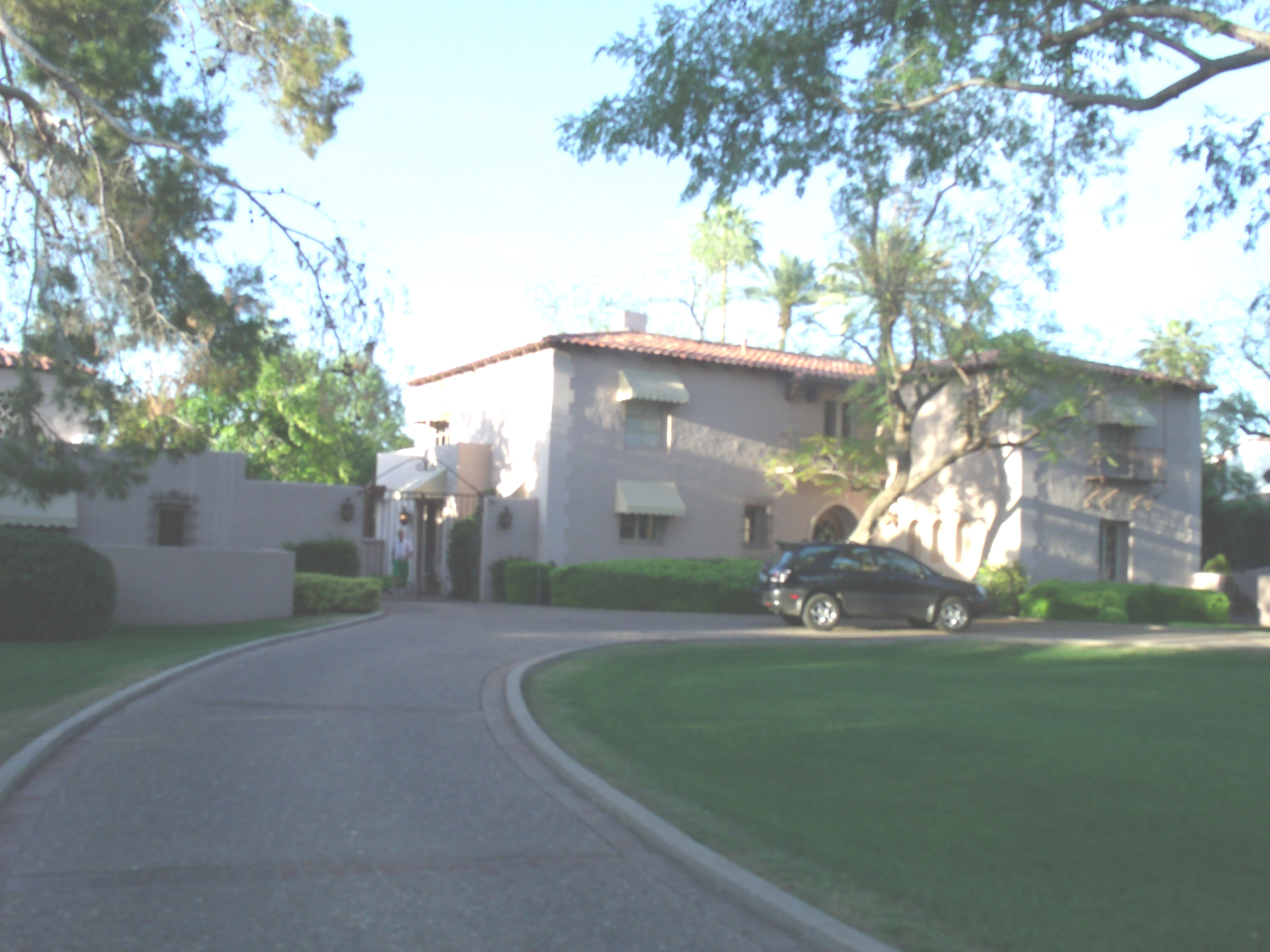
The Bennitt Mansion was built in 1928 and is located at 126 E. Country Club Drive. The mansion is a good example of Spanish Colonial Revival Style residential architecture by master architect, Herbert Harmon Green. E.J. Bennitt was among the investors who in November 1882, organized the First National Bank of Phoenix, which later was reorganized as Valley Bank, which became the largest bank in Arizona. In March 1892, he organized the Phoenix National Bank. He organized the Phoenix Commandery No. 3, K.T., in 1891; was appointed gereneralissimo, elected eminent commander in 1893 and grand commander of the Grand Commandery of Arizona in 1895. The mansion was listed in the National Register of Historic Places on August 12, 2009, reference #09000609.

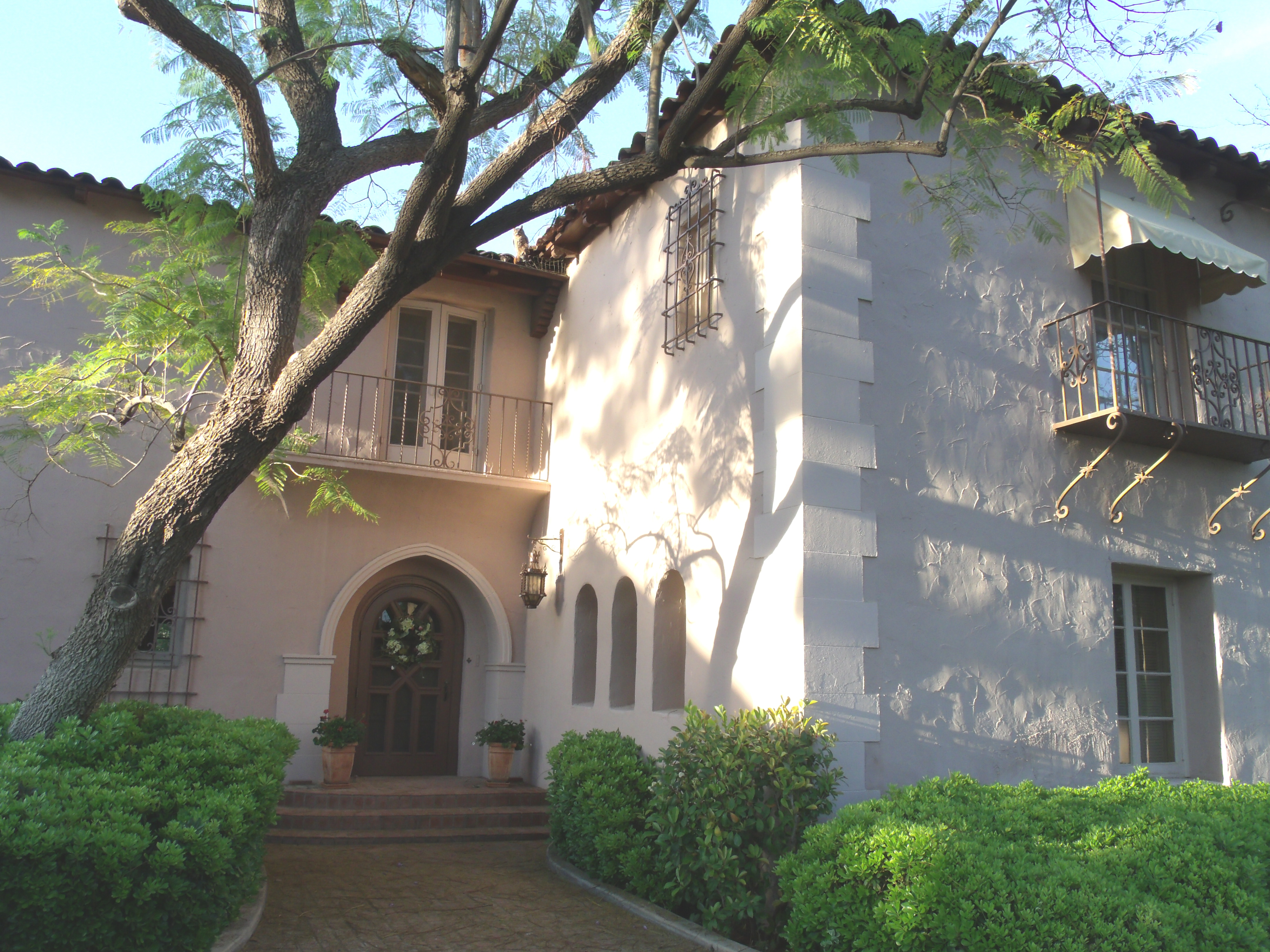
The focal point of the Bennitt Mansion is its arched doorway. The arch is articulated by the use of natural finish concrete formed to replicate cut stone jamb blocks and voussoirs with raked joints. Special craftsmanship is found in the milled door casing, which follows the curve of the semicircular arched opening. The heavy, stained wood door has 11 recessed panel delineated by high-relief moldings. The mansion was listed in the National Register of Historic Places on August 12, 2009, reference #09000609.

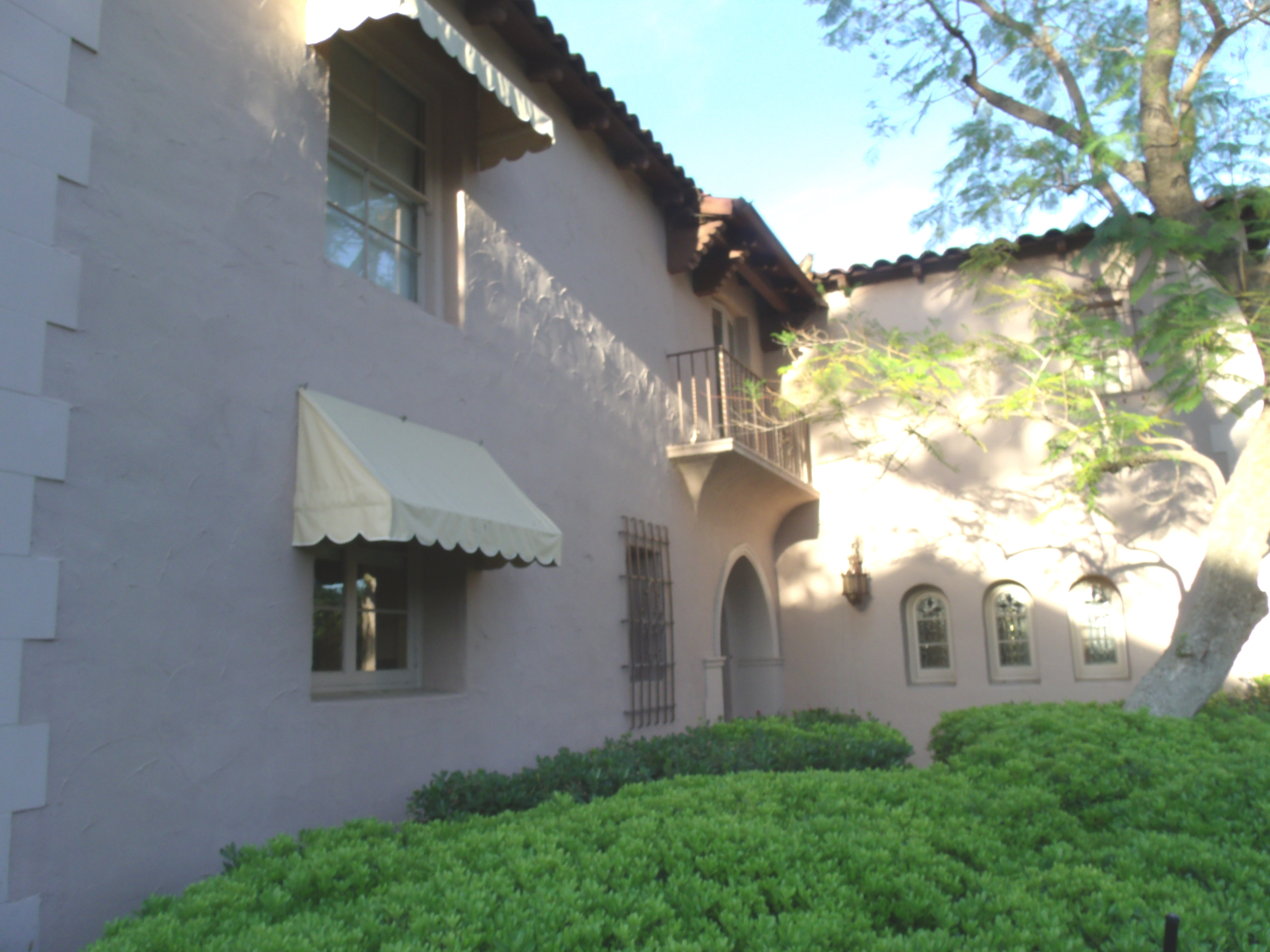
Different view of the Bennitt Mansion

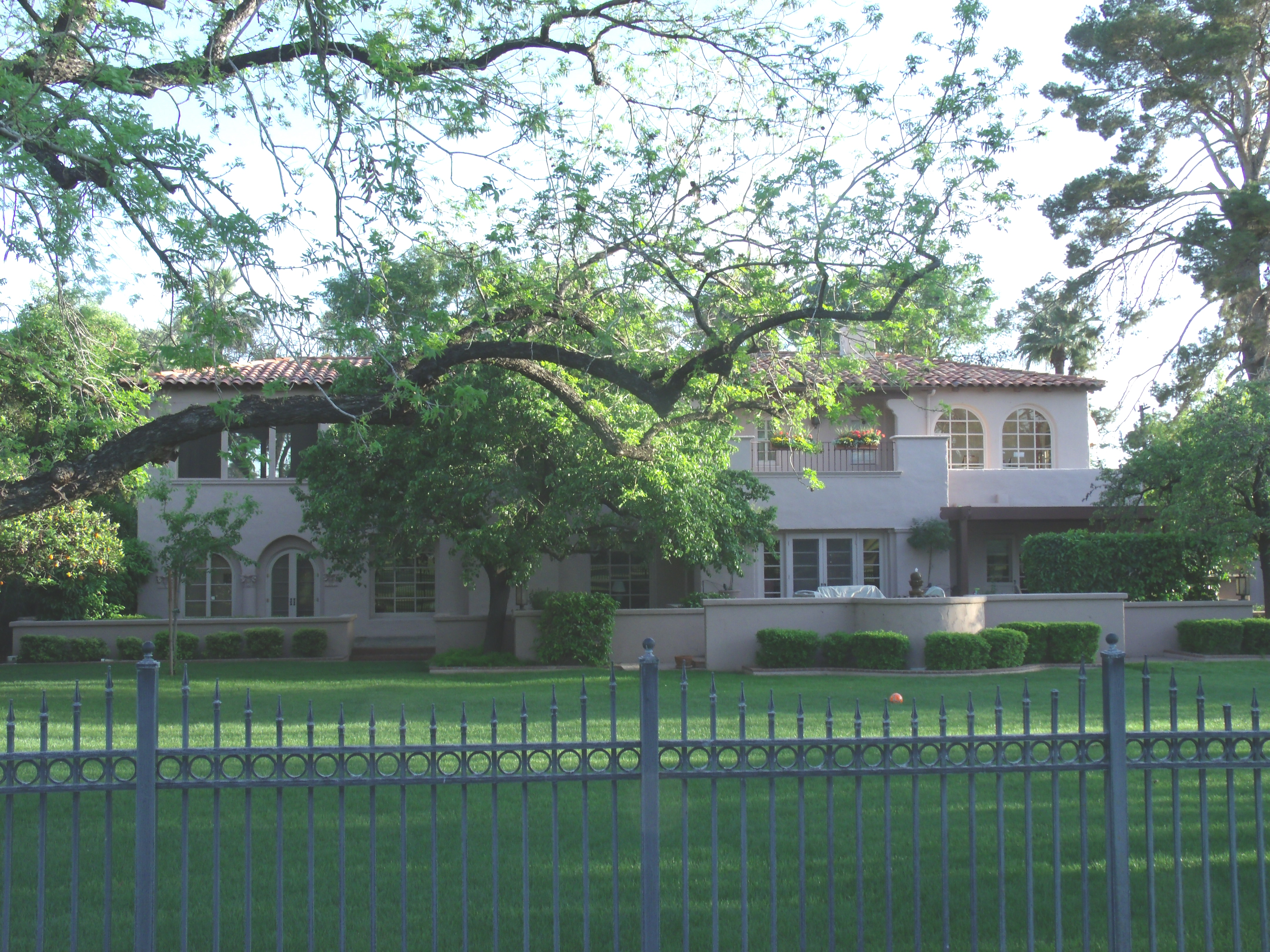
Back of the Bennitt Mansion

=== Mystery Castle ===
Mystery Castle
Listed in the Phoenix Historic Property Register
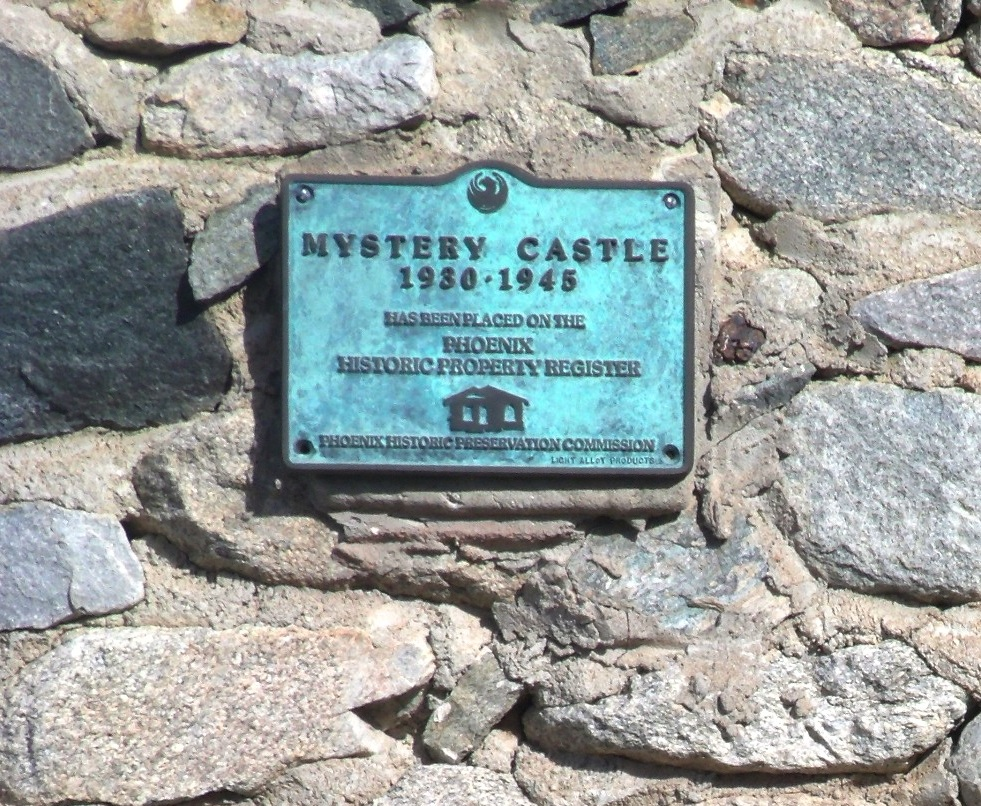
Historic Mystery Castle plaque.

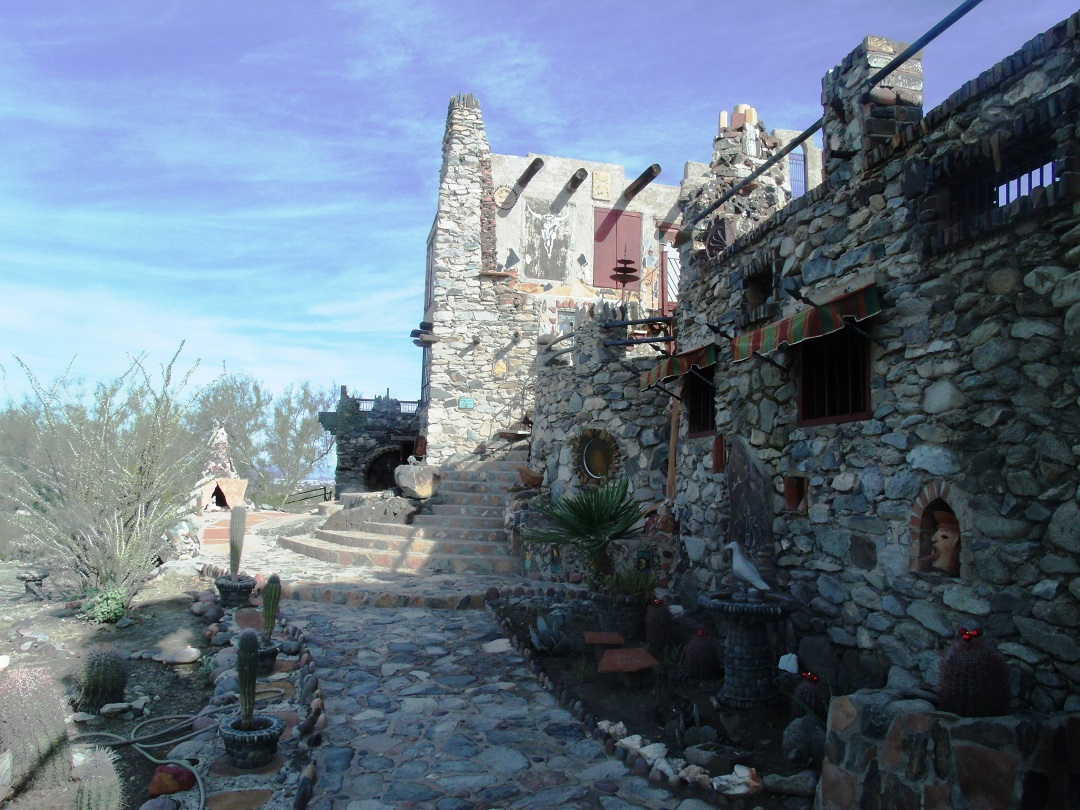
Mystery Castle is located at 800 E. Mineral Road, in the city of Phoenix, in the foothills of South Mountain Park. It was built in the 1930s by Boyce Luther Gulley. The castle is designated as a Phoenix Point of Pride.

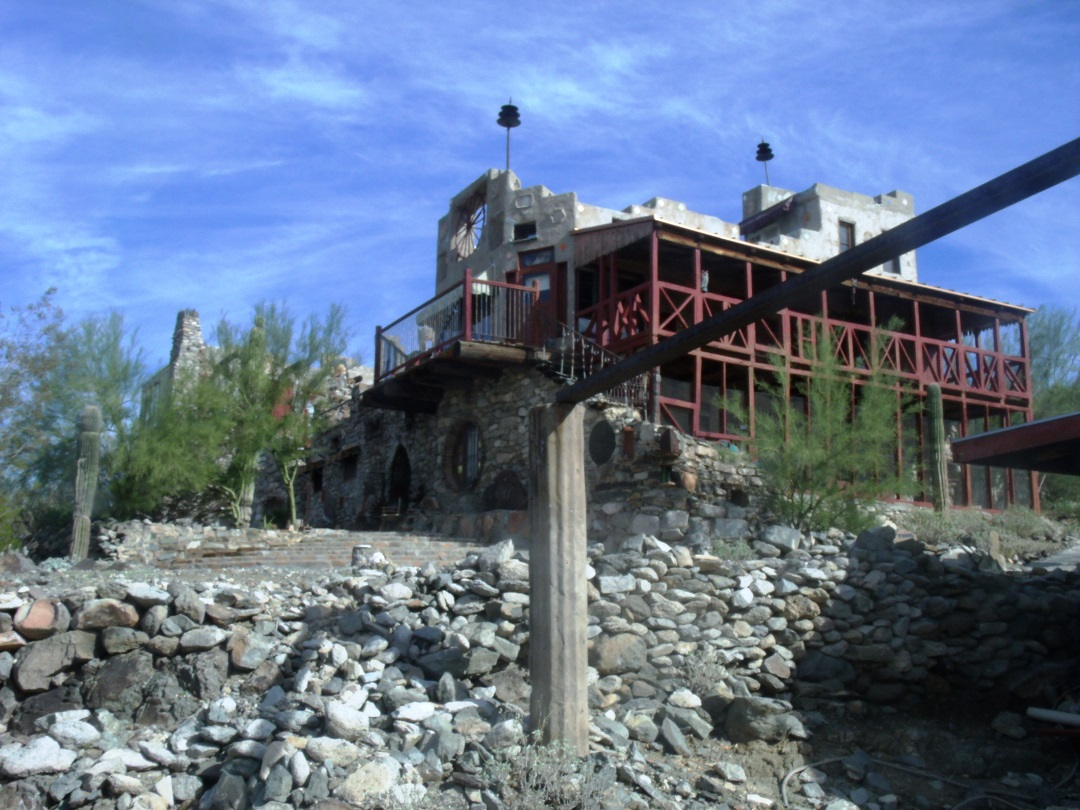
Different view of the Mystery Castle.

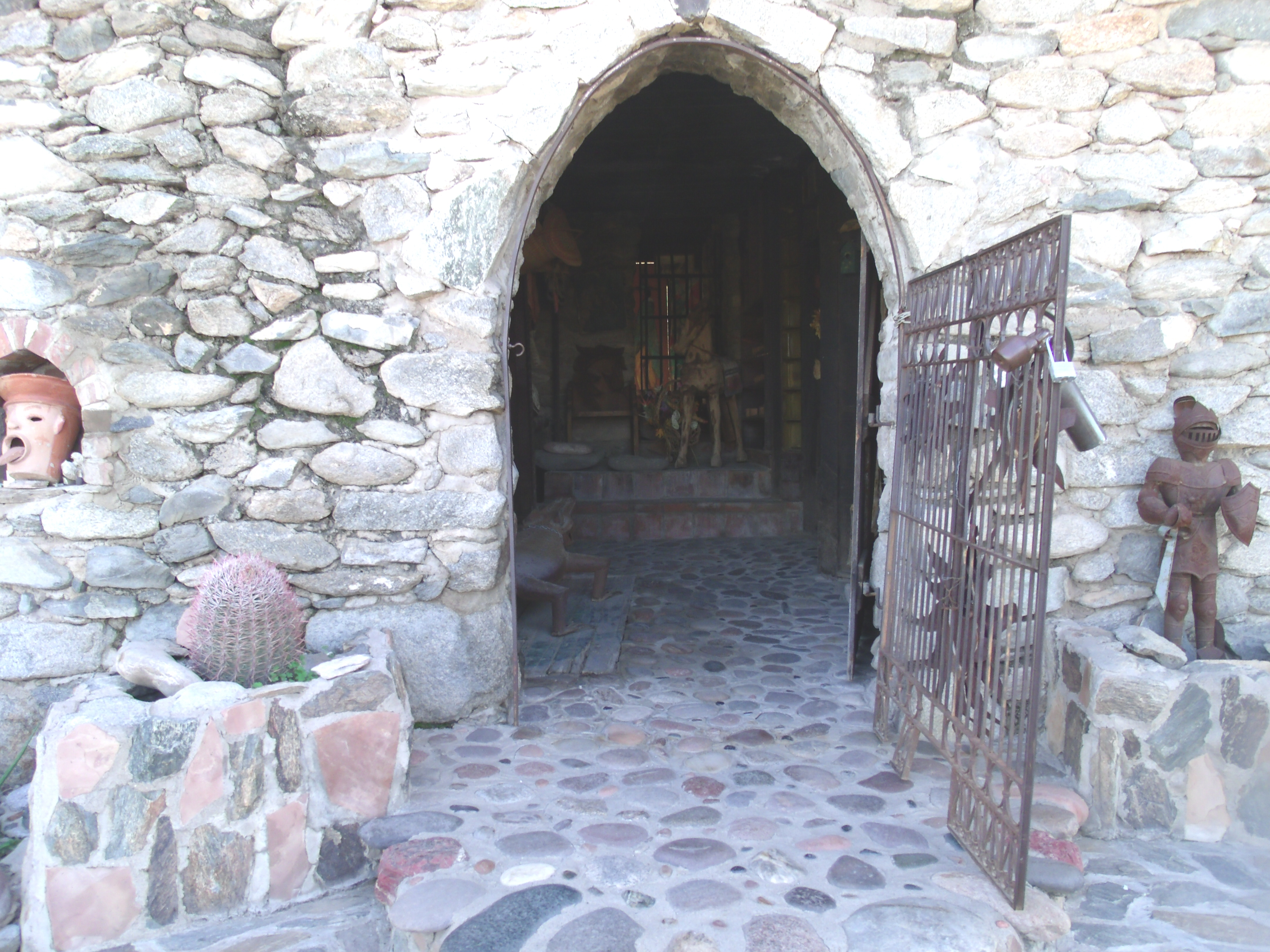
Main entrance of the castle/

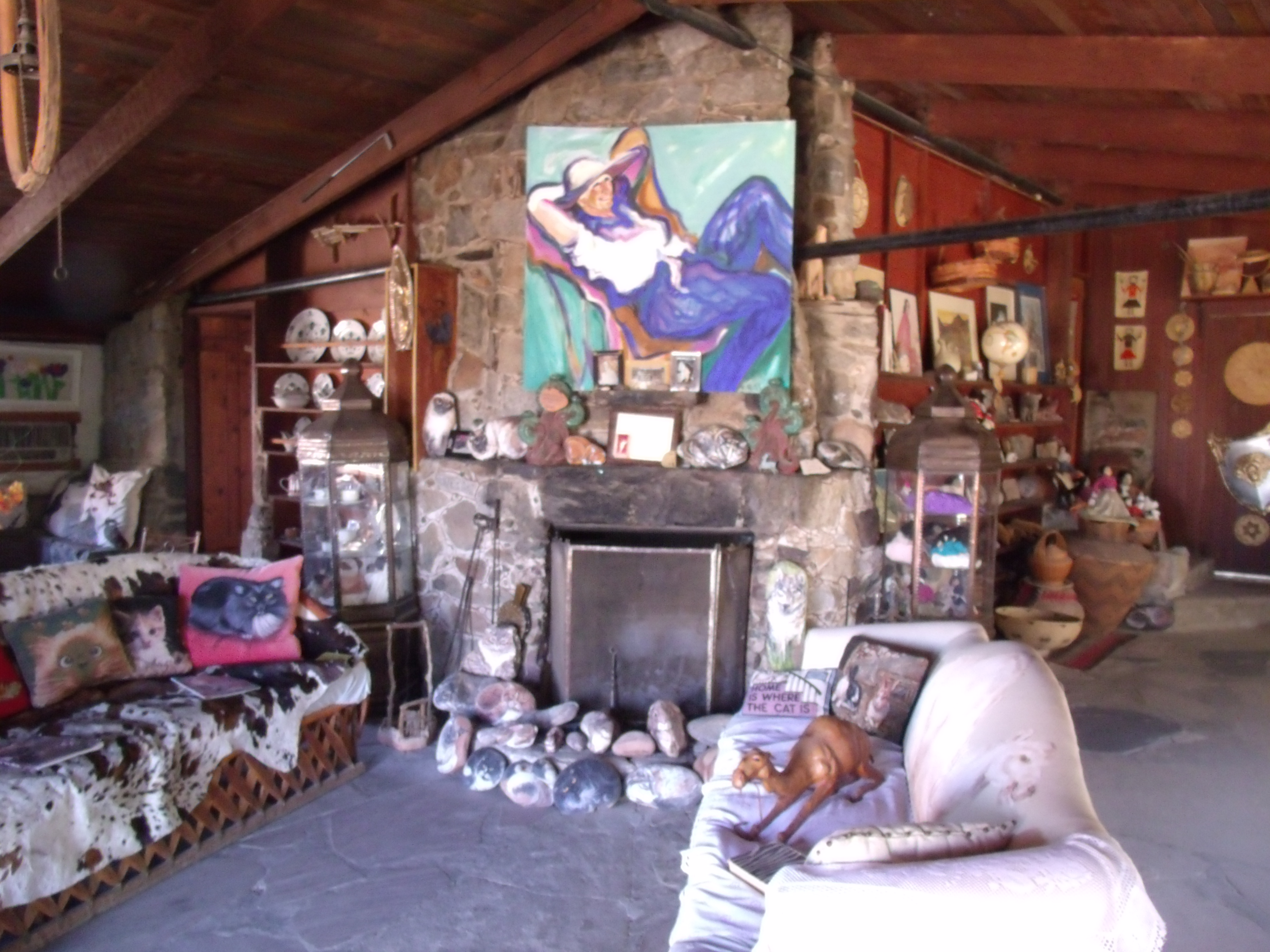
One of 18 rooms in the castle.

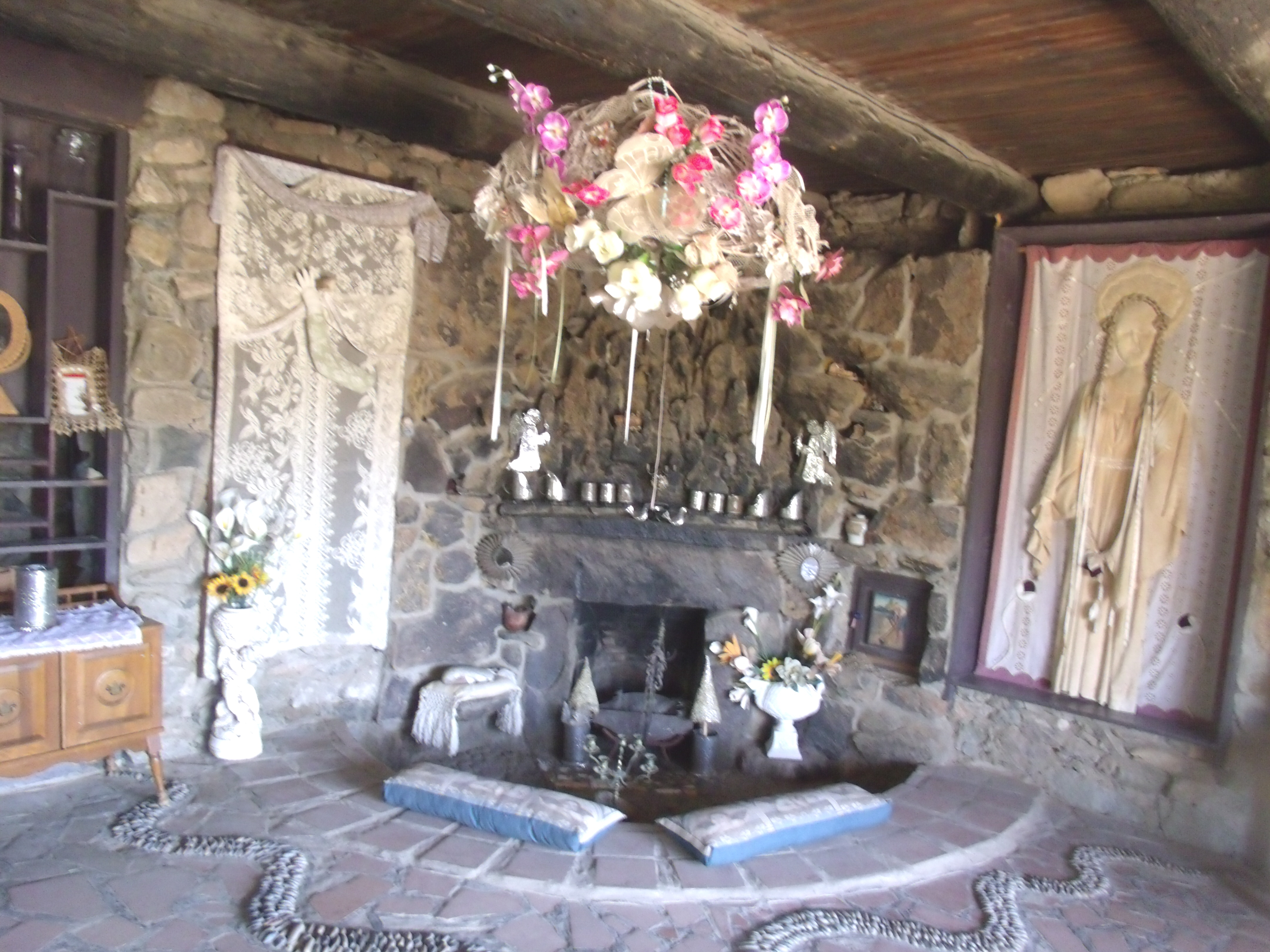
Another room in the castle.

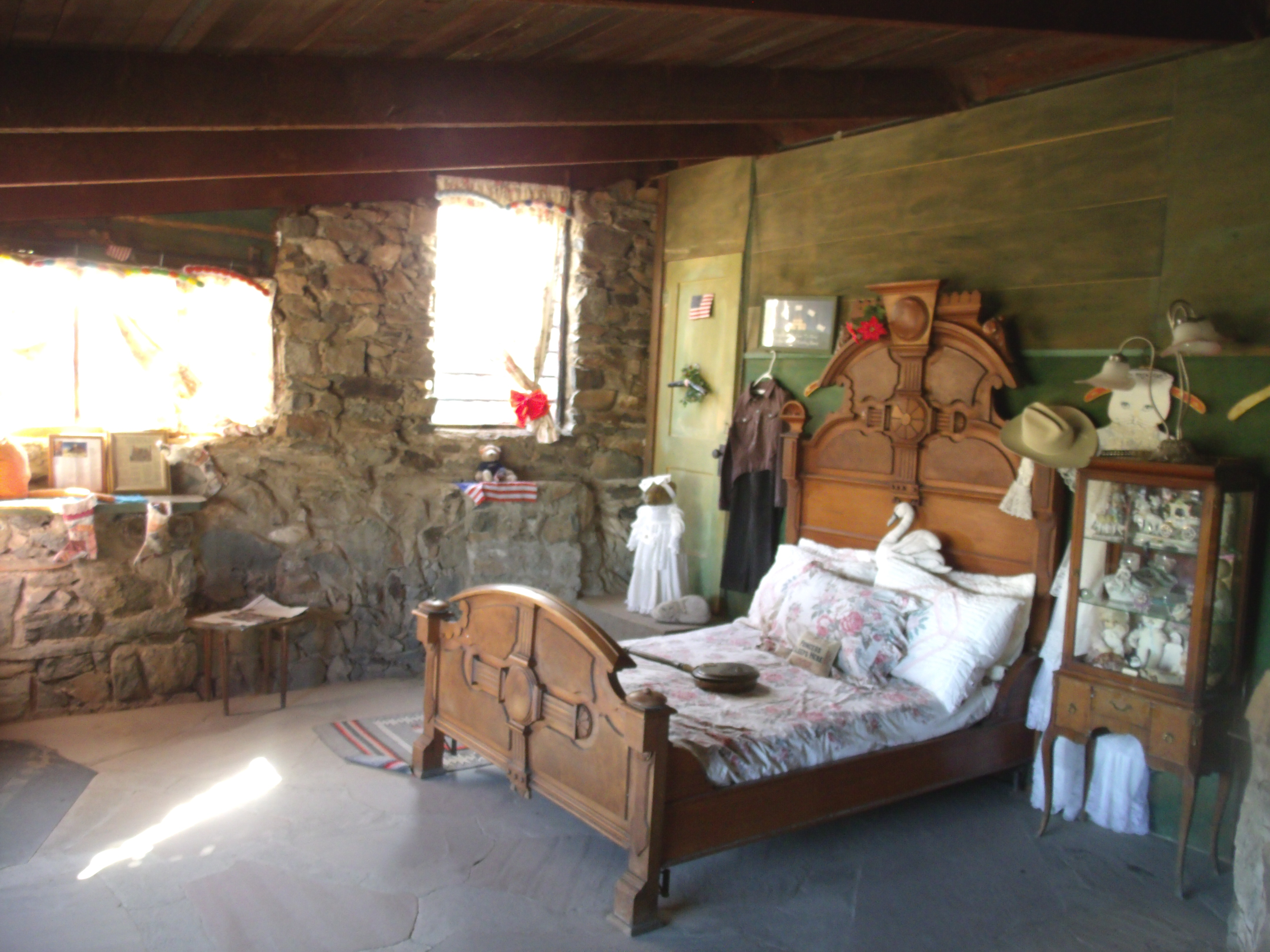
Mary Lou Gulley's bedroom.

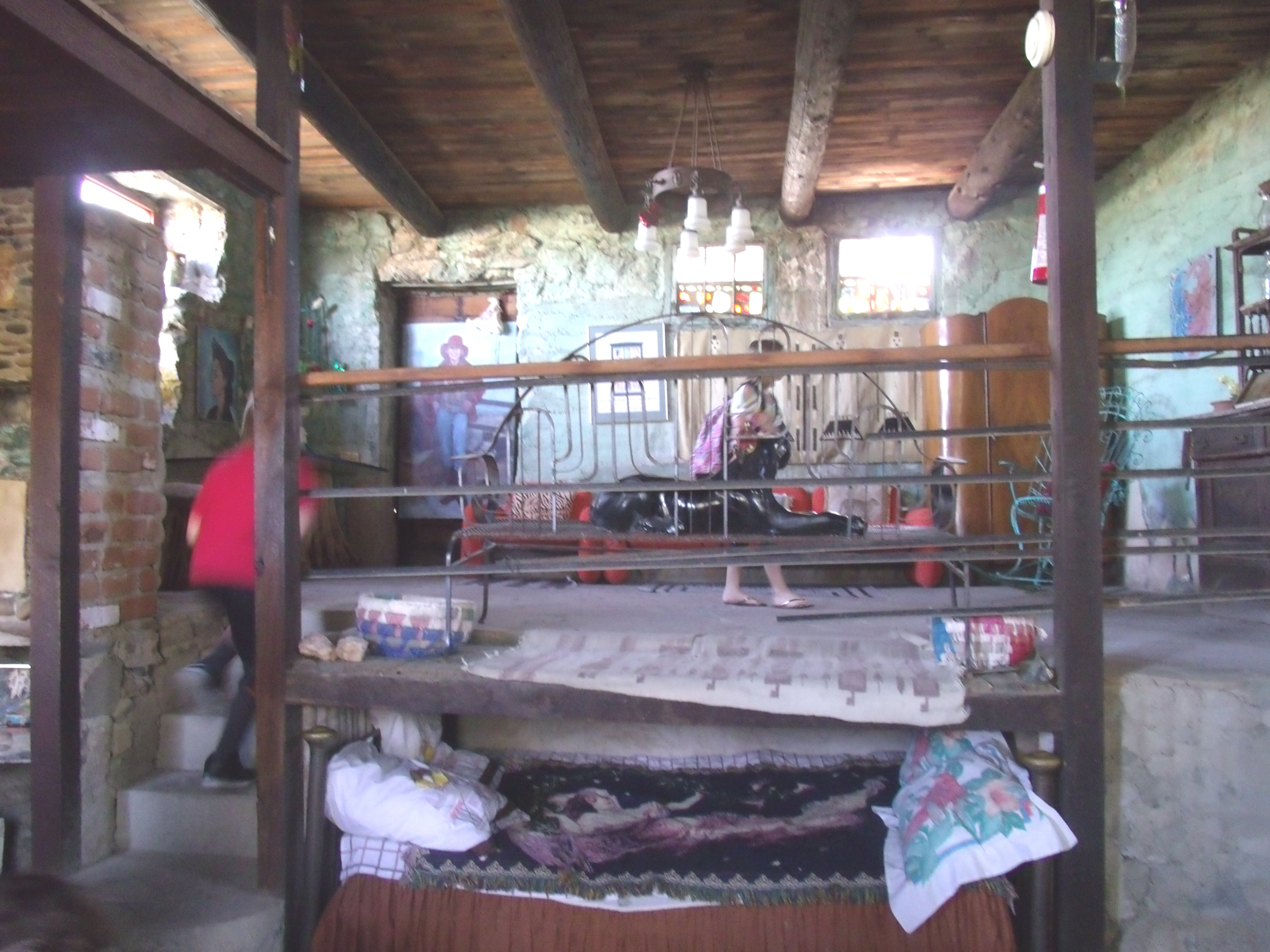
Another bedroom in the castle.

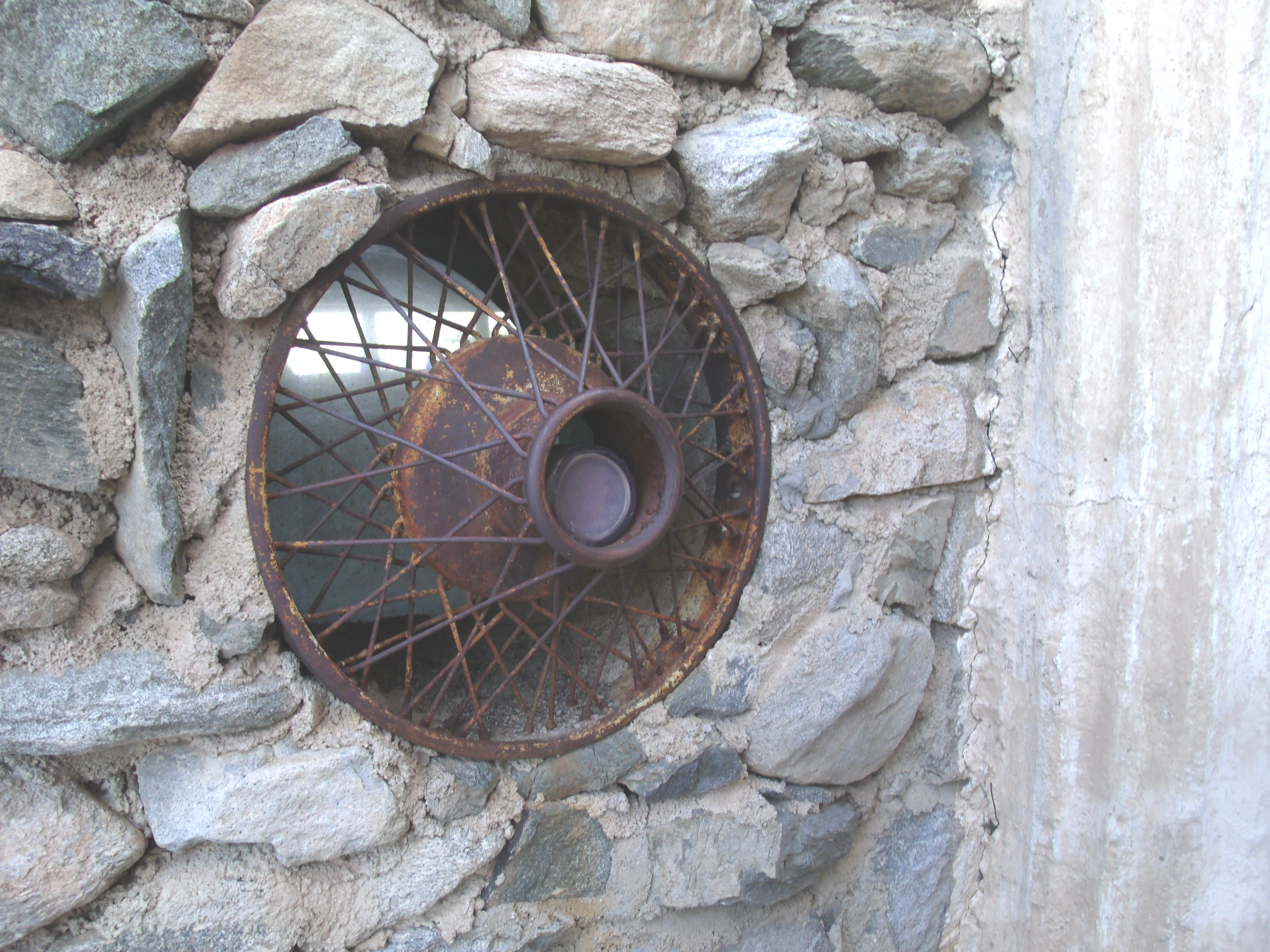
Pictured is a window that Gulley made with the spoke rim of an old car. The castle is designated as a Phoenix Point of Pride.

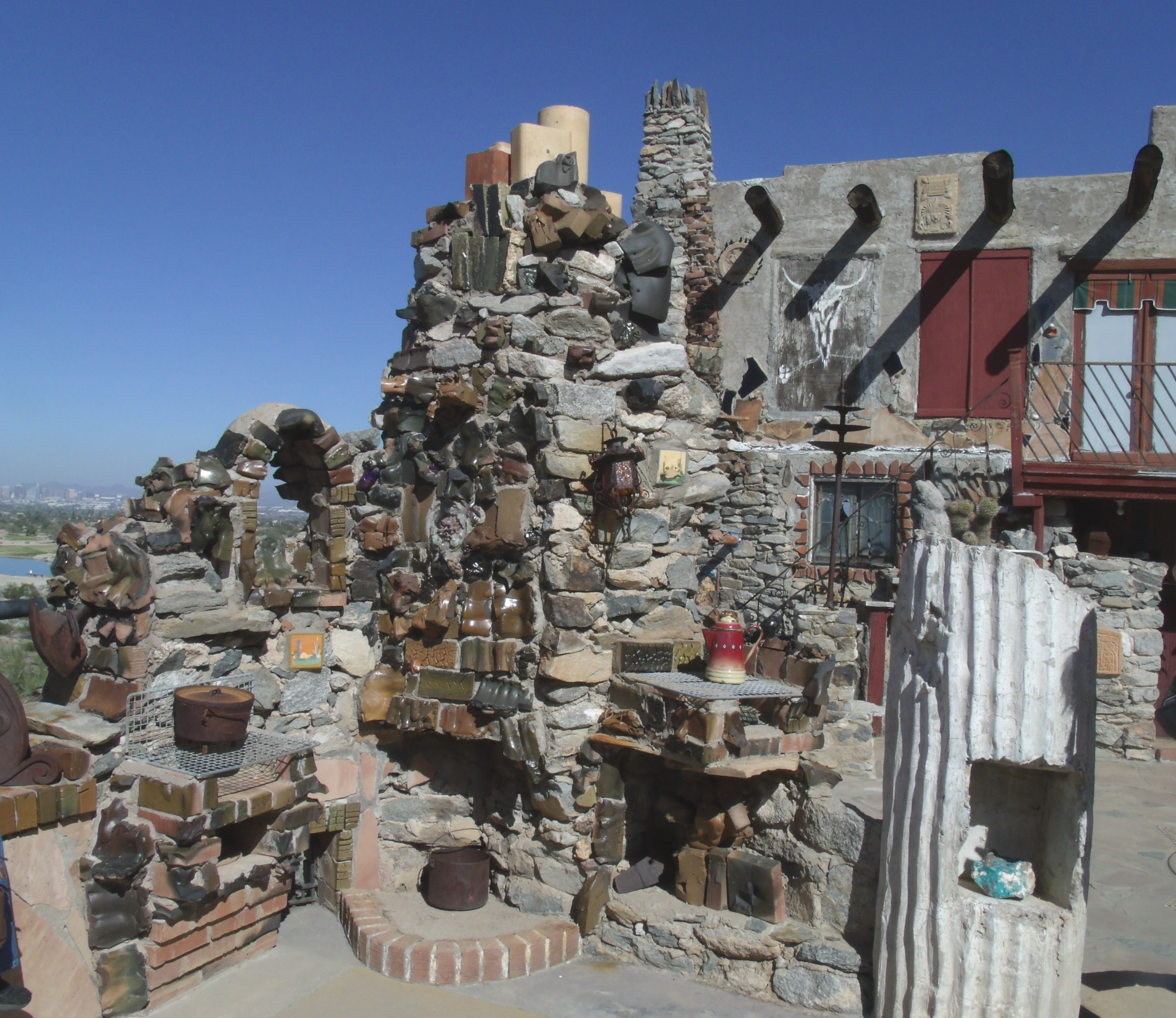
Image of the BBQ Pit.

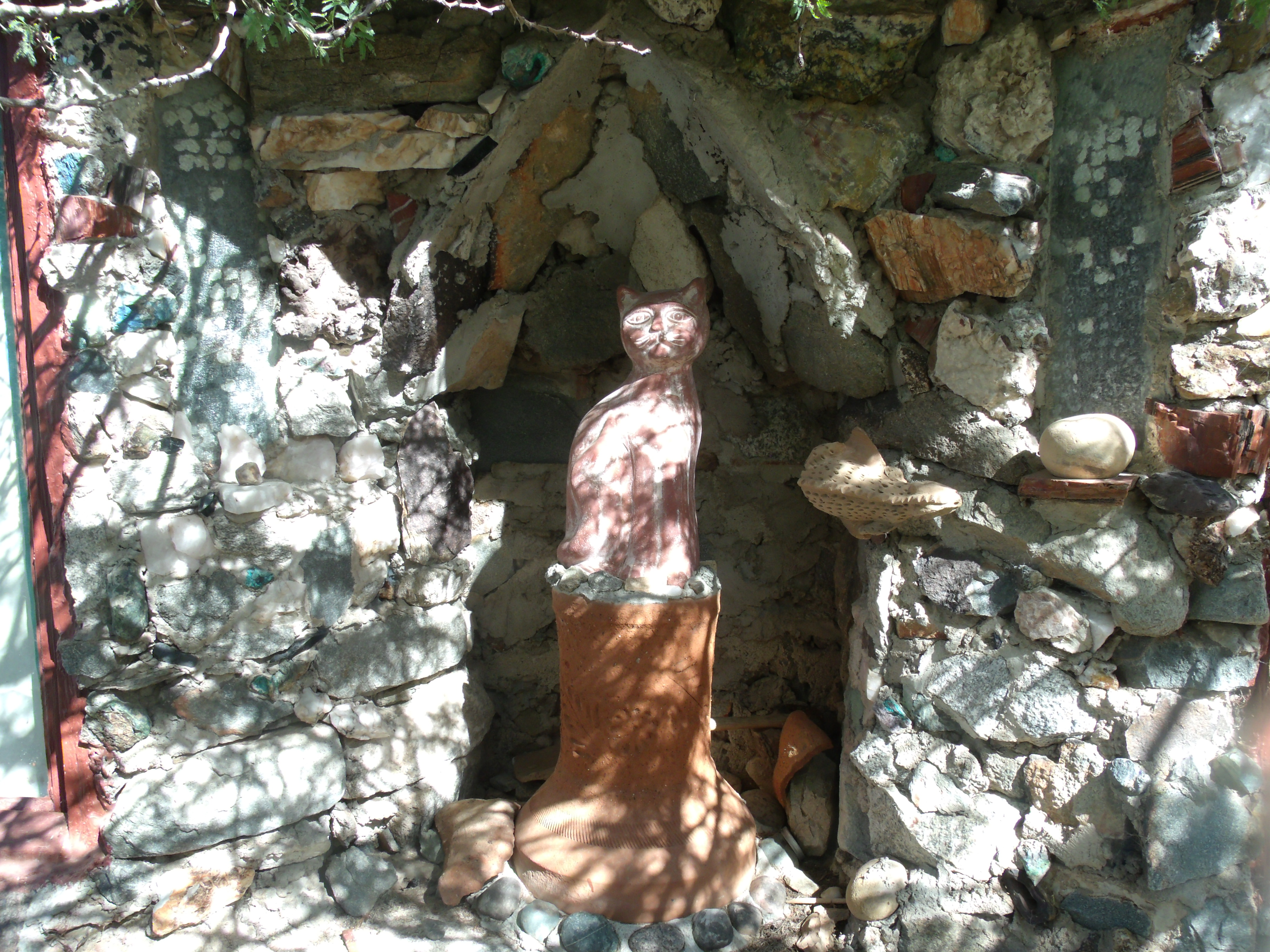
Ornament on a wall outside of the castle which resembles a cat.

=== Scorpion Gulch ===
Scorpion Gulch
Listed in the "Phoenix Historic Property Register".
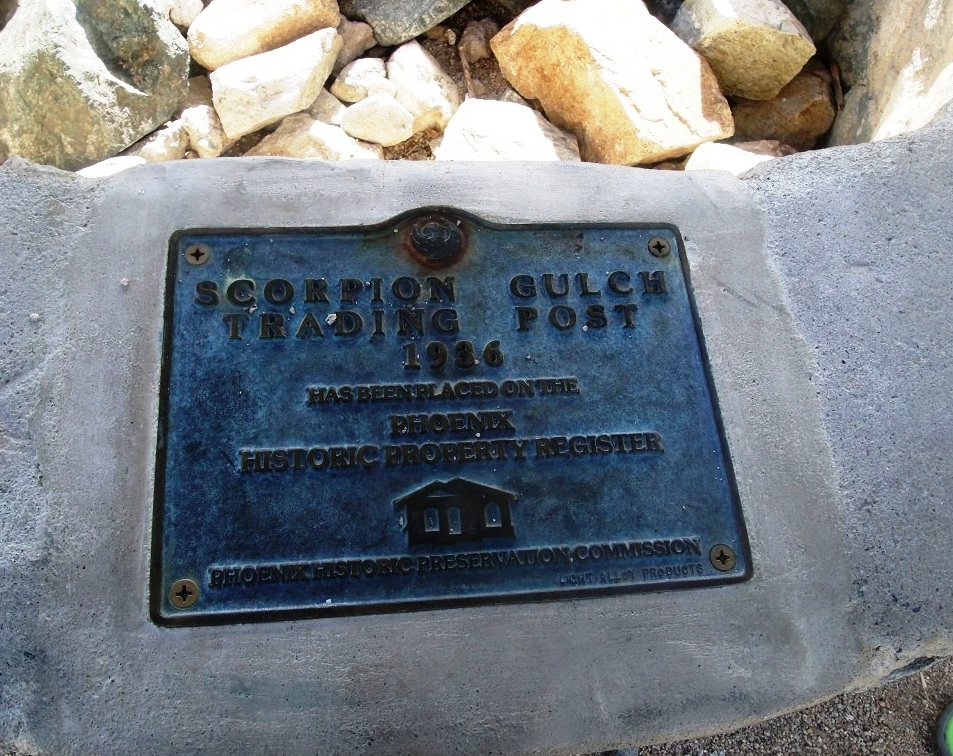
Scorpion Gulch historical marker, which reads "Scorpion Gulch Trading Post 1936".

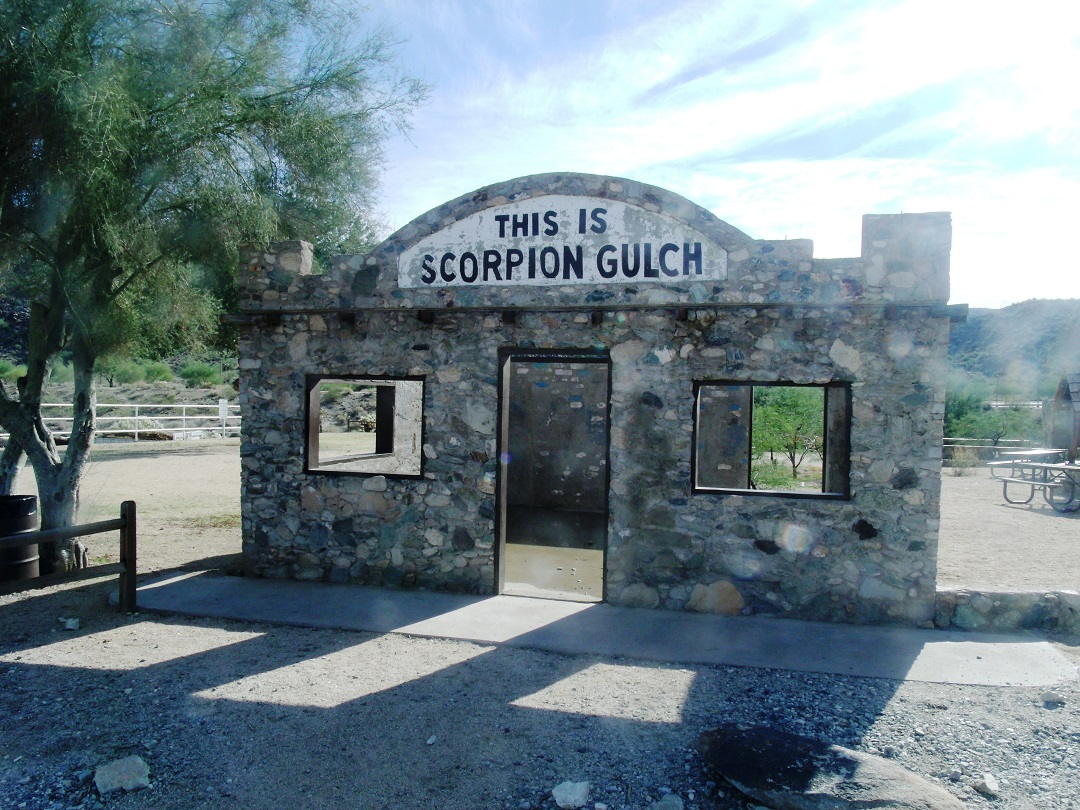
The Scorpion Gulch store was built in 1936 by William Lunsford. It is located at 10225 S. Central Ave, in South Mountain Park in Phoenix, Arizona. The property was listed in the Phoenix Historic Property and Preservation Register in October of 1990 (PHPR).

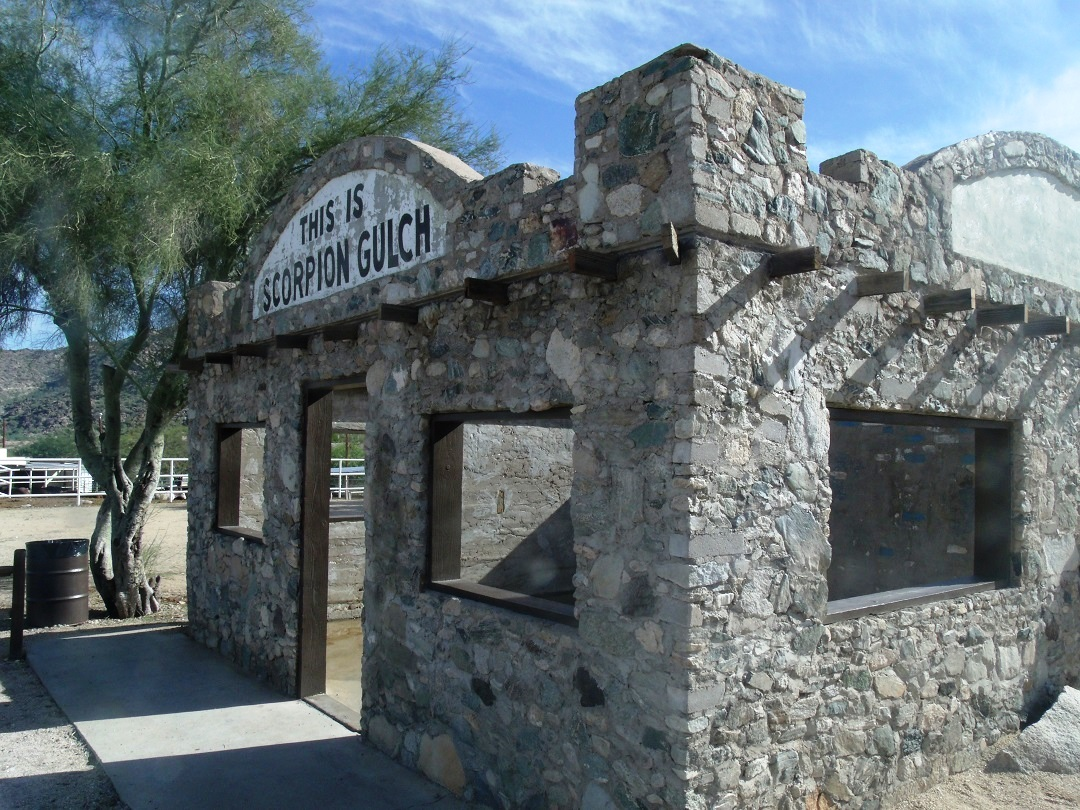
Different view of the Scorpion Gulch store (PHPR).

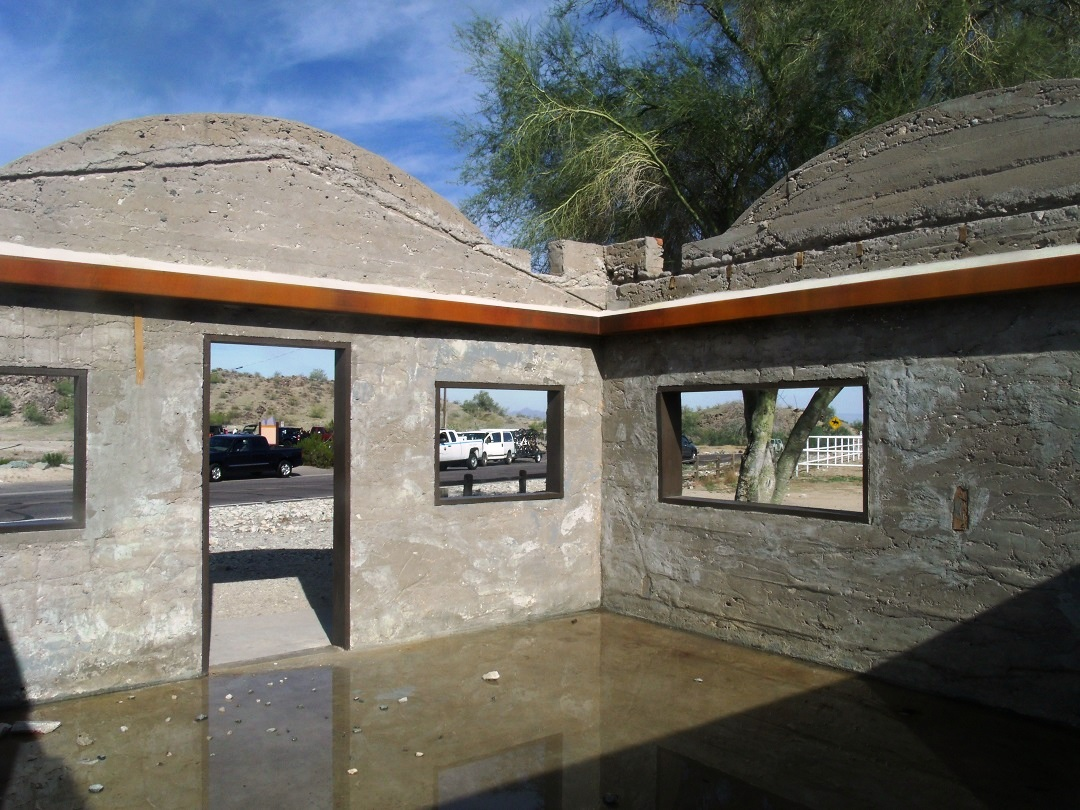
Inside view of the Scorpion Gulch store (PHPR).

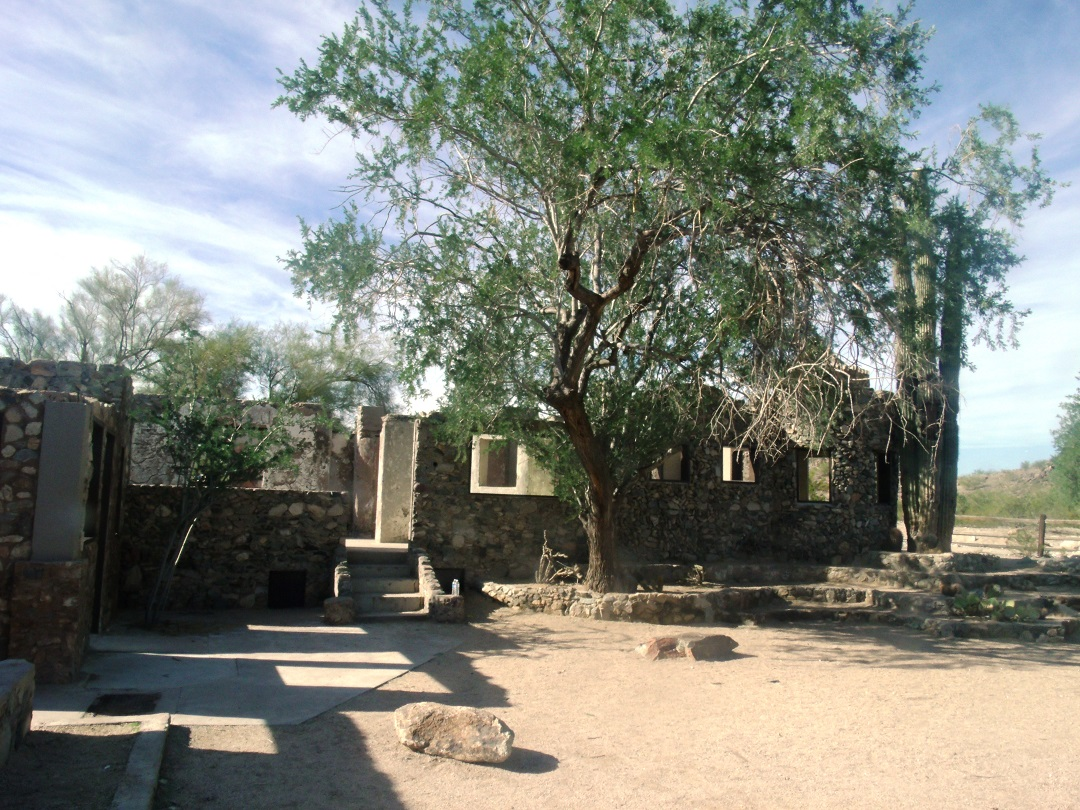
The ruins of the Scorpion Gulch residence. It is located at 10225 S. Central Ave, in South Mountain Park in Phoenix, Arizona. The property was listed in the Phoenix Historic Property and Preservation Register in October of 1990 (PHPR).

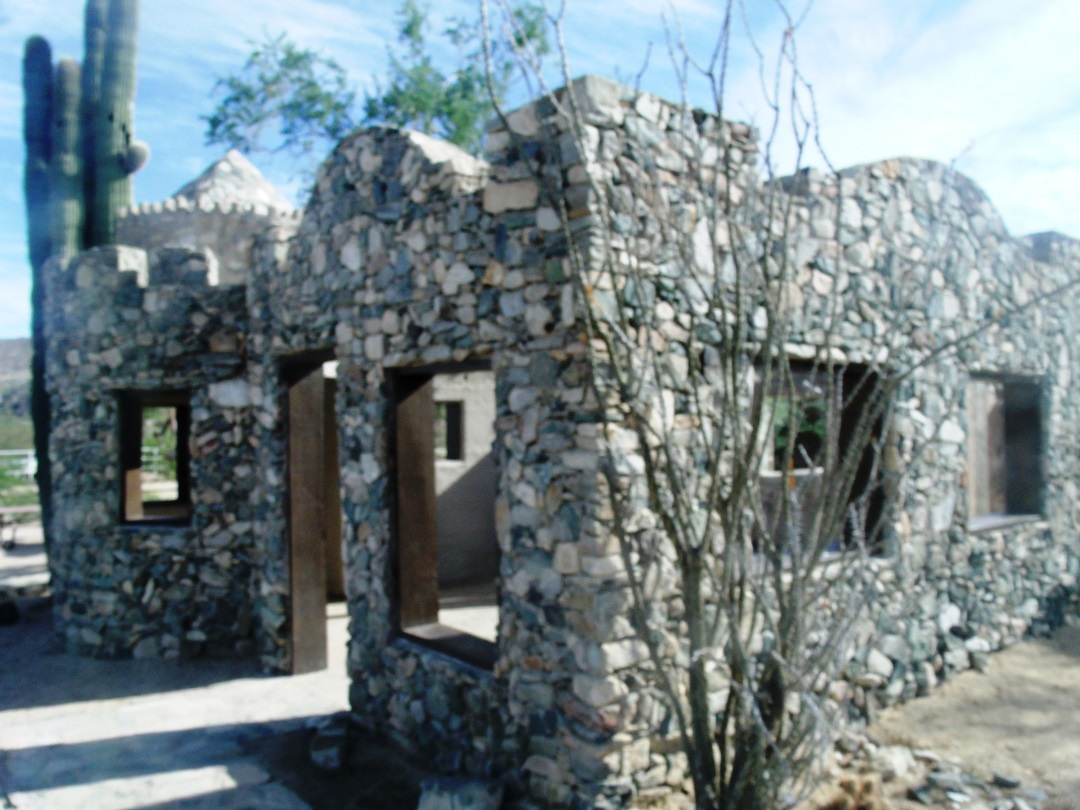
Front view of the ruins of the Scorpion Gulch residence (PHPR).

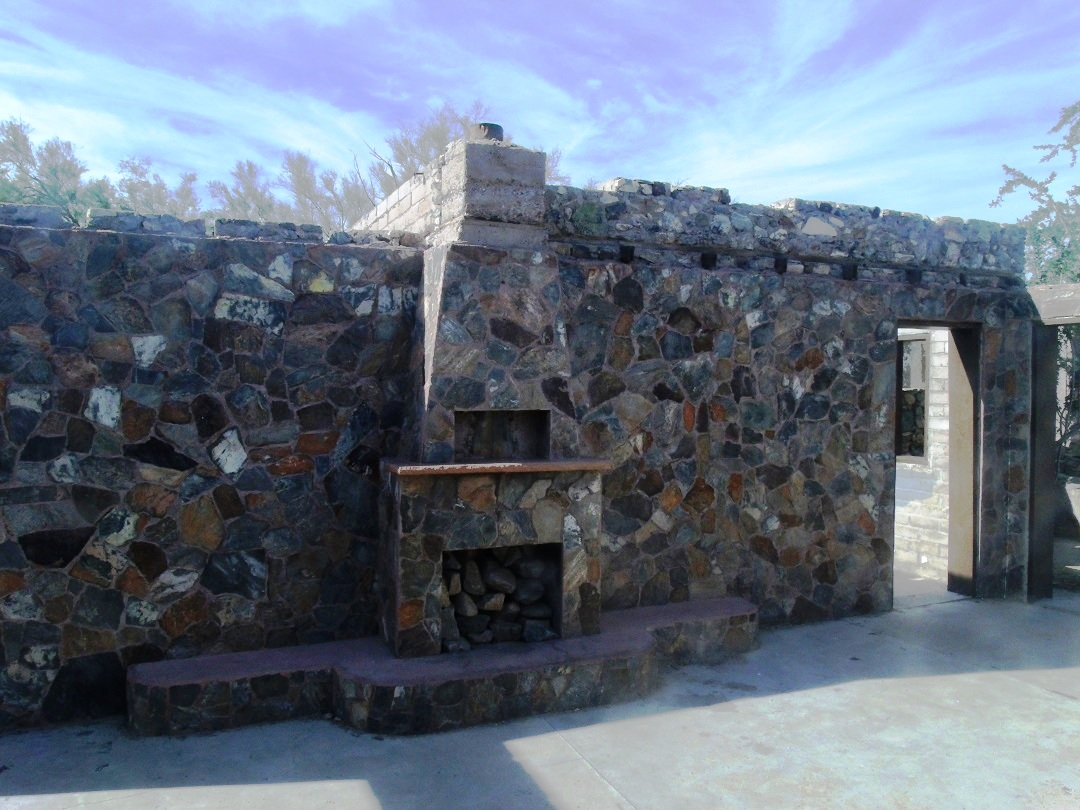
The main room (living room) ruins of the Scorpion Gulch residence (PHPR).

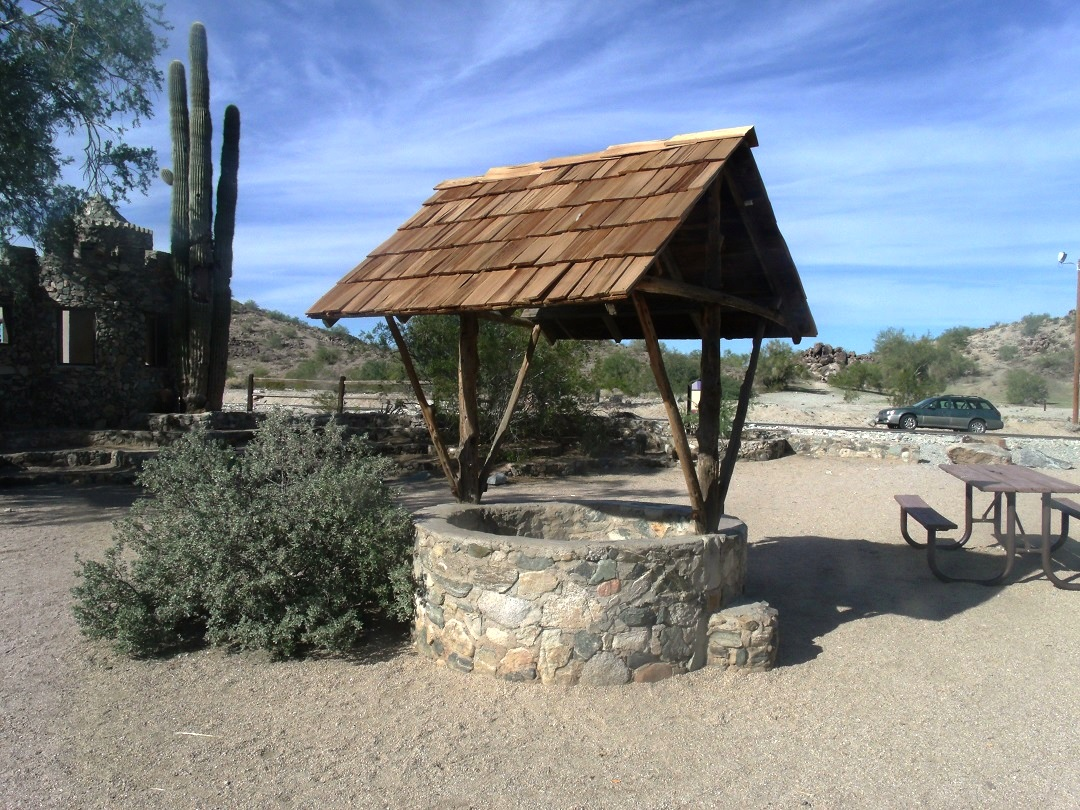
The Scorpion Gulch Well (PHPR).

=== Squaw Peak Inn ===
Squaw Peak Inn
Listed in the National Register of Historic Places

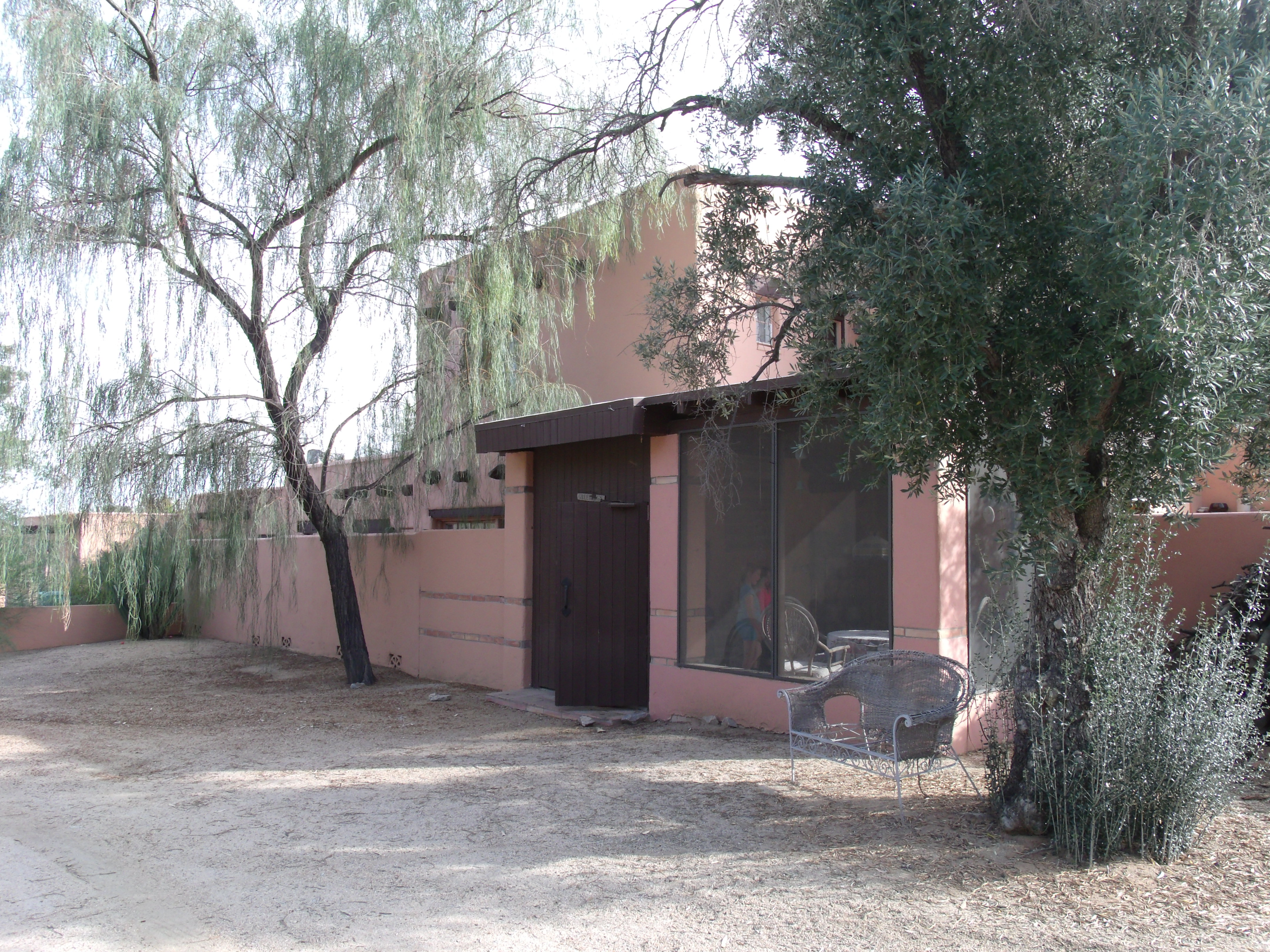
Squaw Peak Inn (formerly Squaw Peak Ranch) This is the main building, it was built in 1937

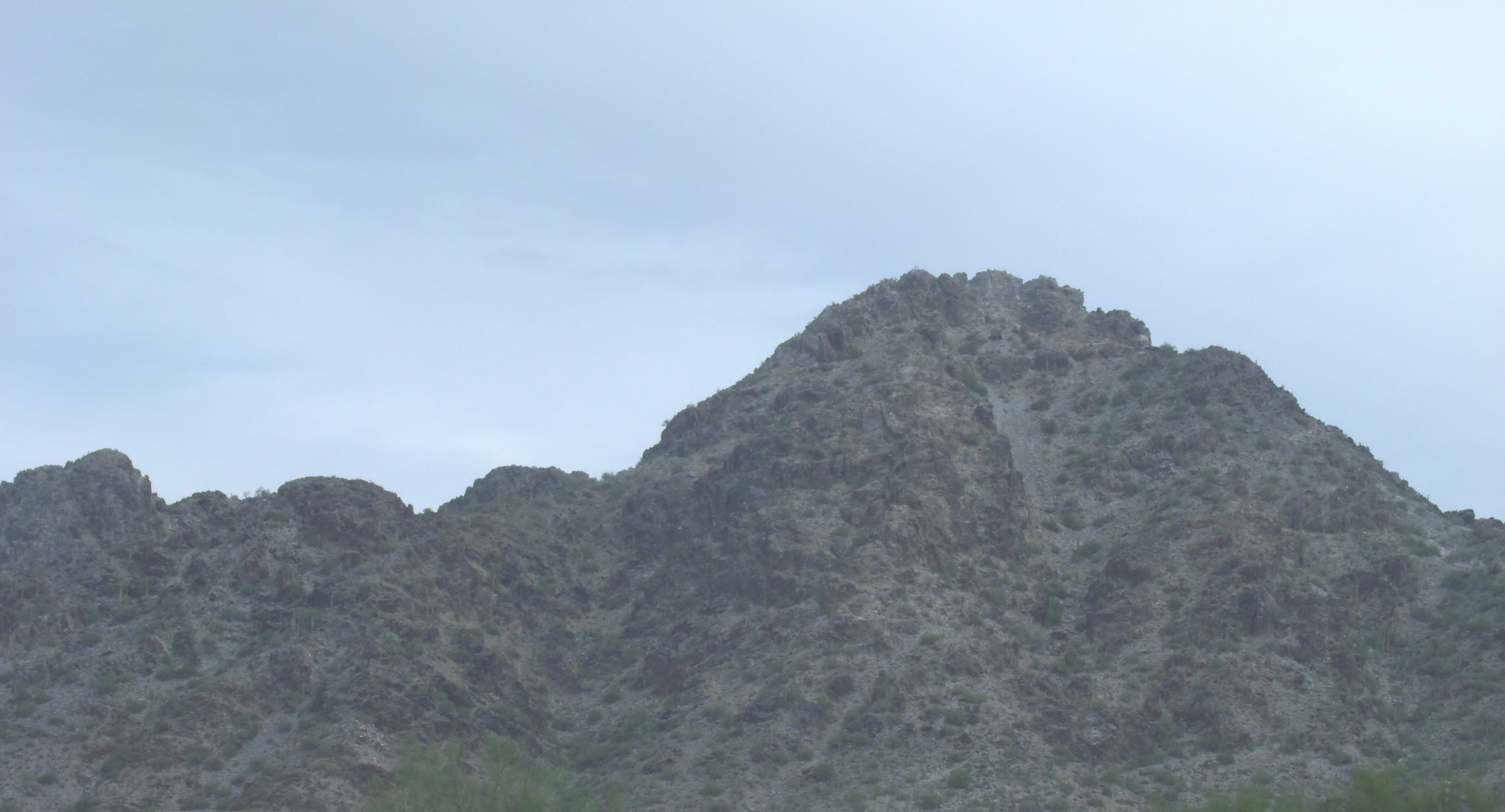
Squaw Peak Mountain

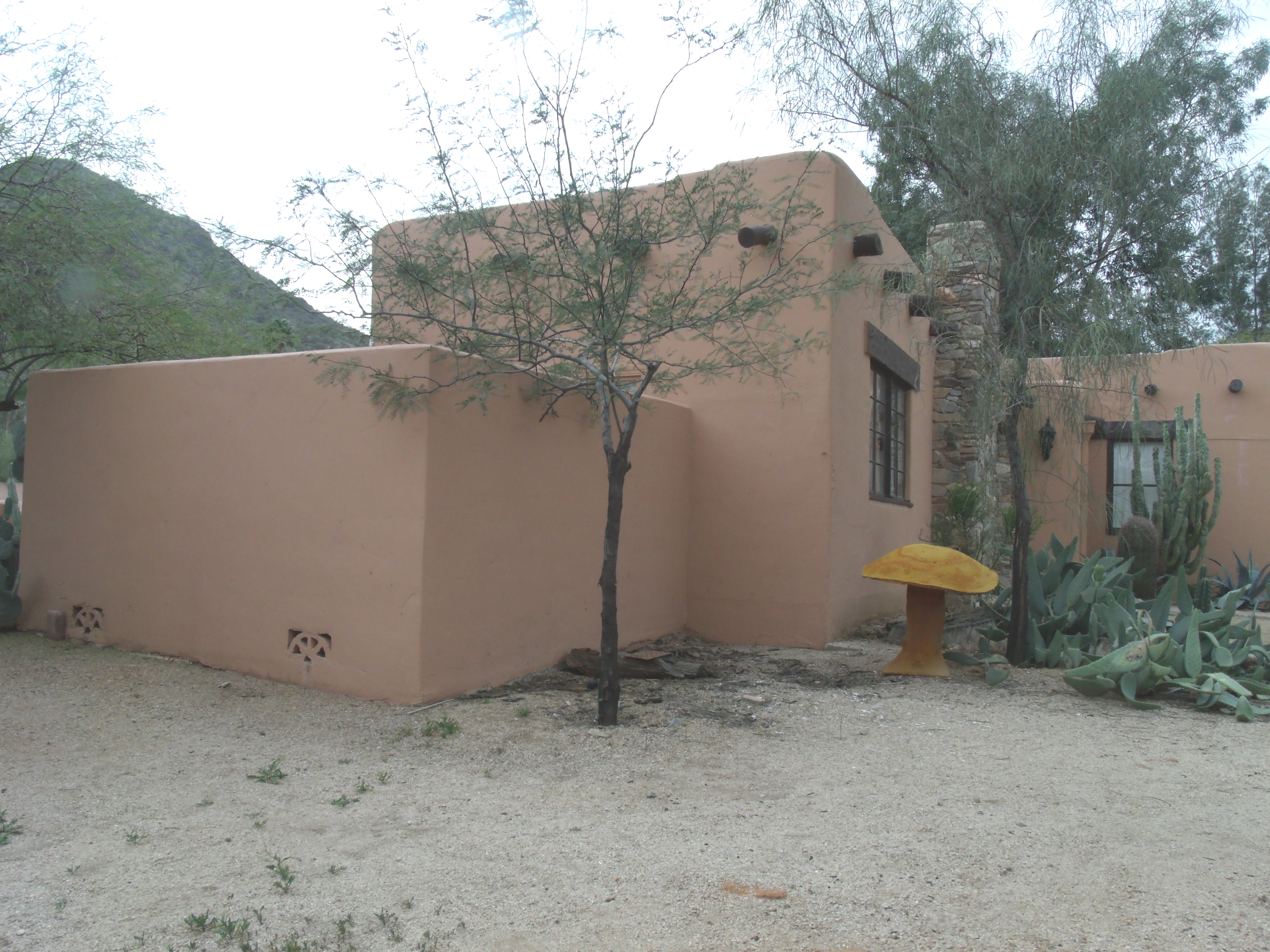
The first building built in 1929 by William Eugene D'Allemund in what became Squaw Peak Ranch and later Squaw Peak Inn.

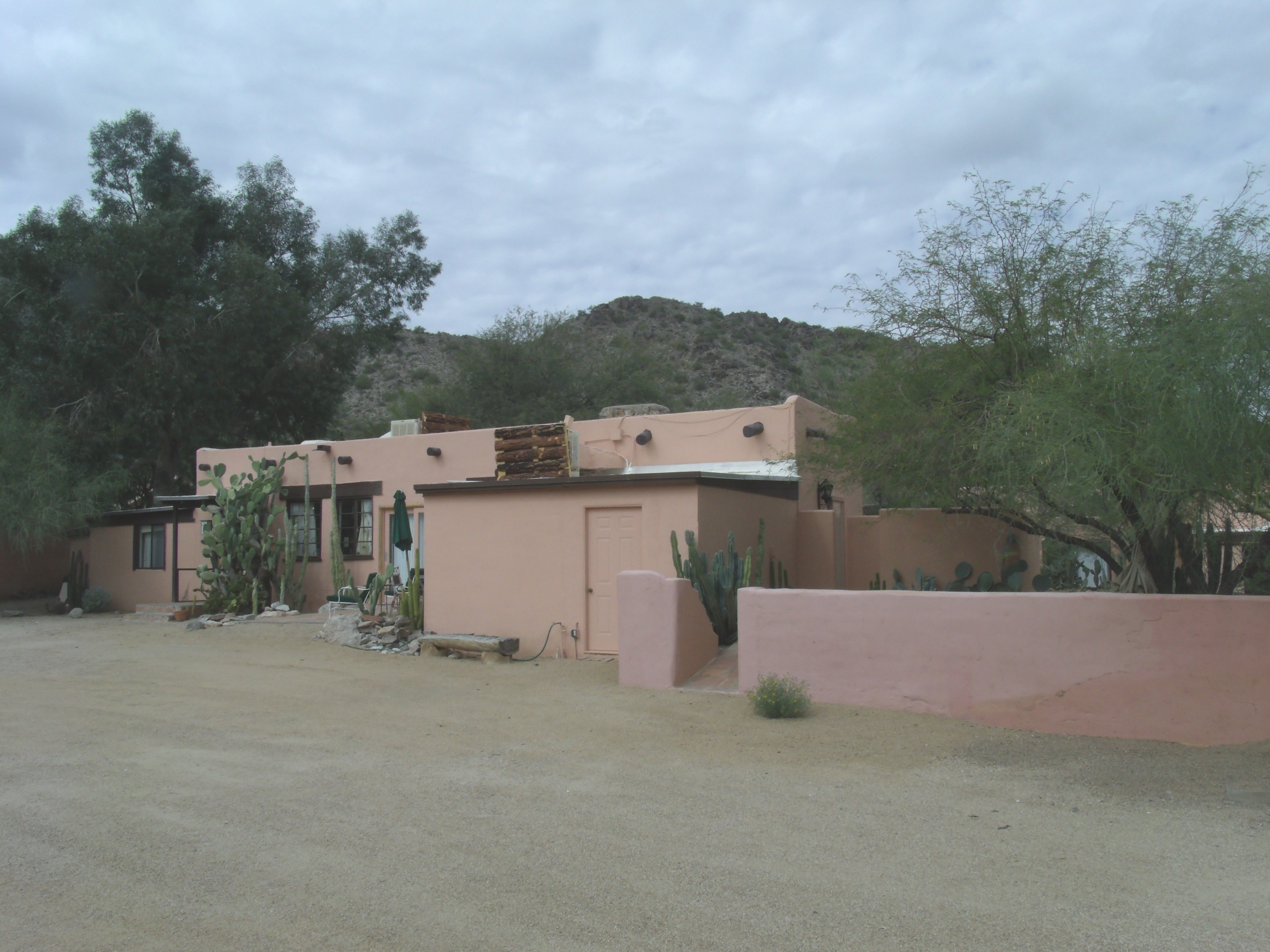
Another view of the first adobe building built in 1929 by William Eugene D’Allemund. The building was the first property of what was to become Squaw Peak Ranch and later Squaw Peak Inn.

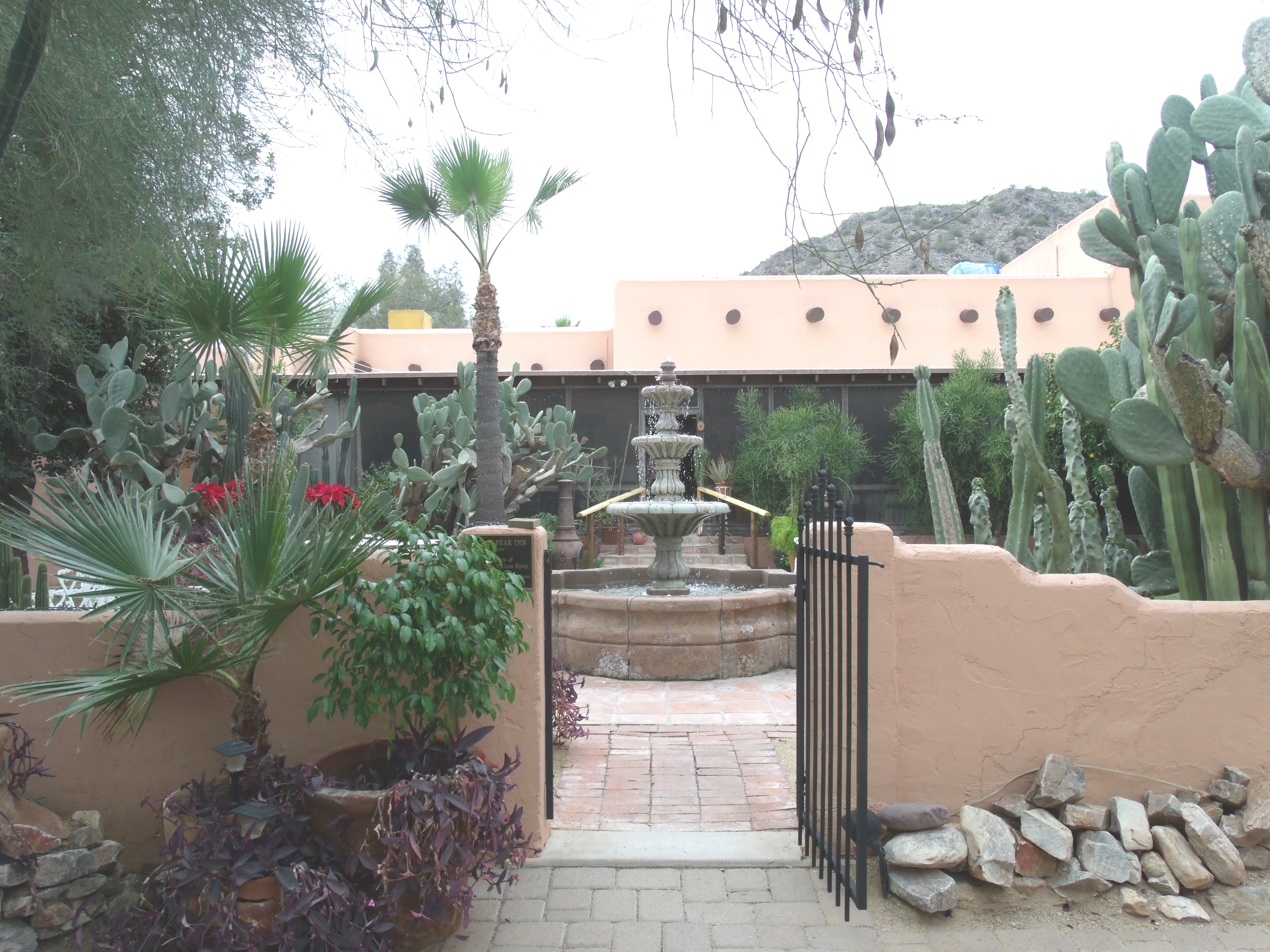
Main entrance to the historic Inn. The Water fountain was added after the Epley's purchased the property.

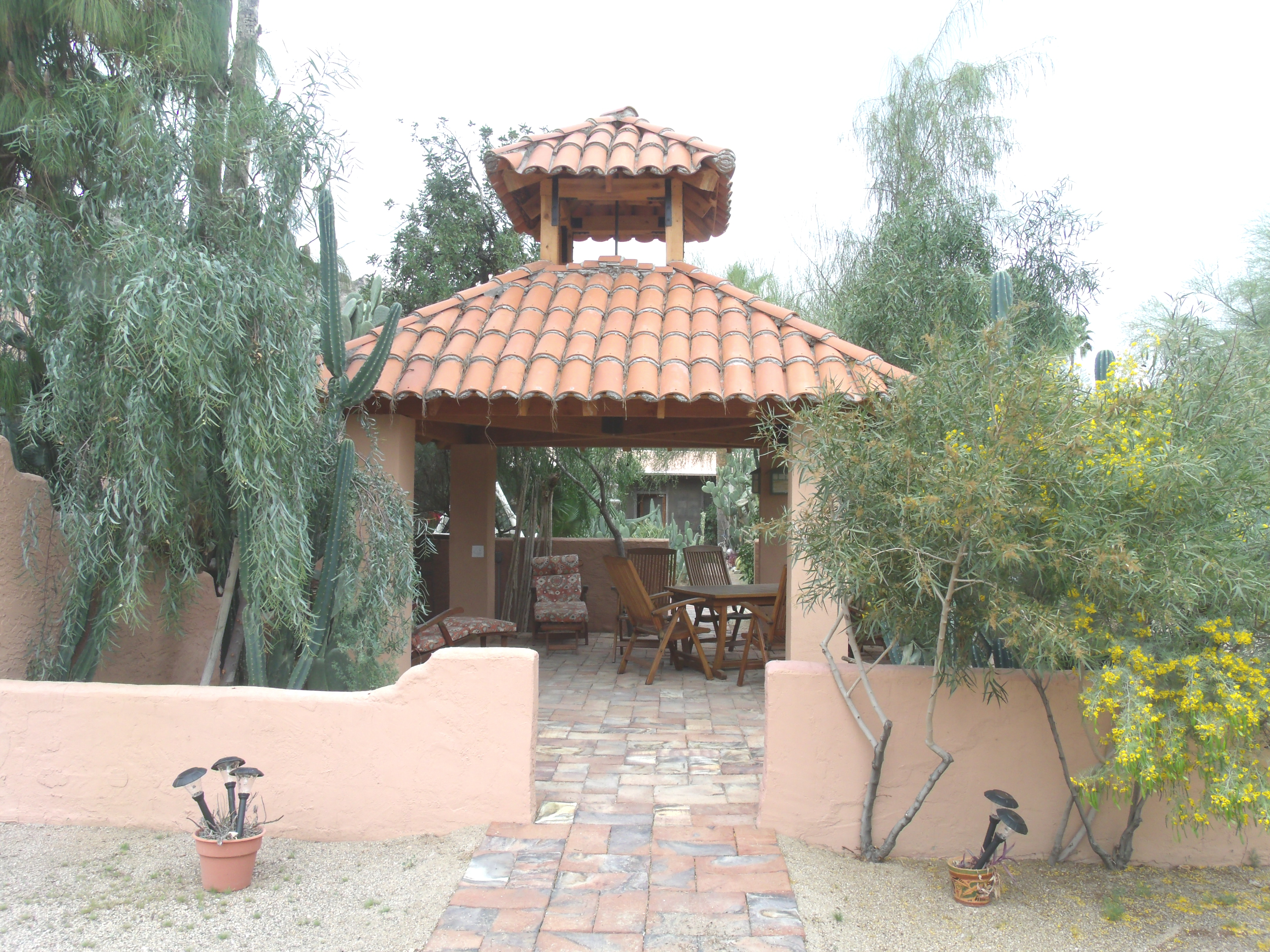
A gazebo on the property of Squaw Peak Inn built by William "Bill" Epley.

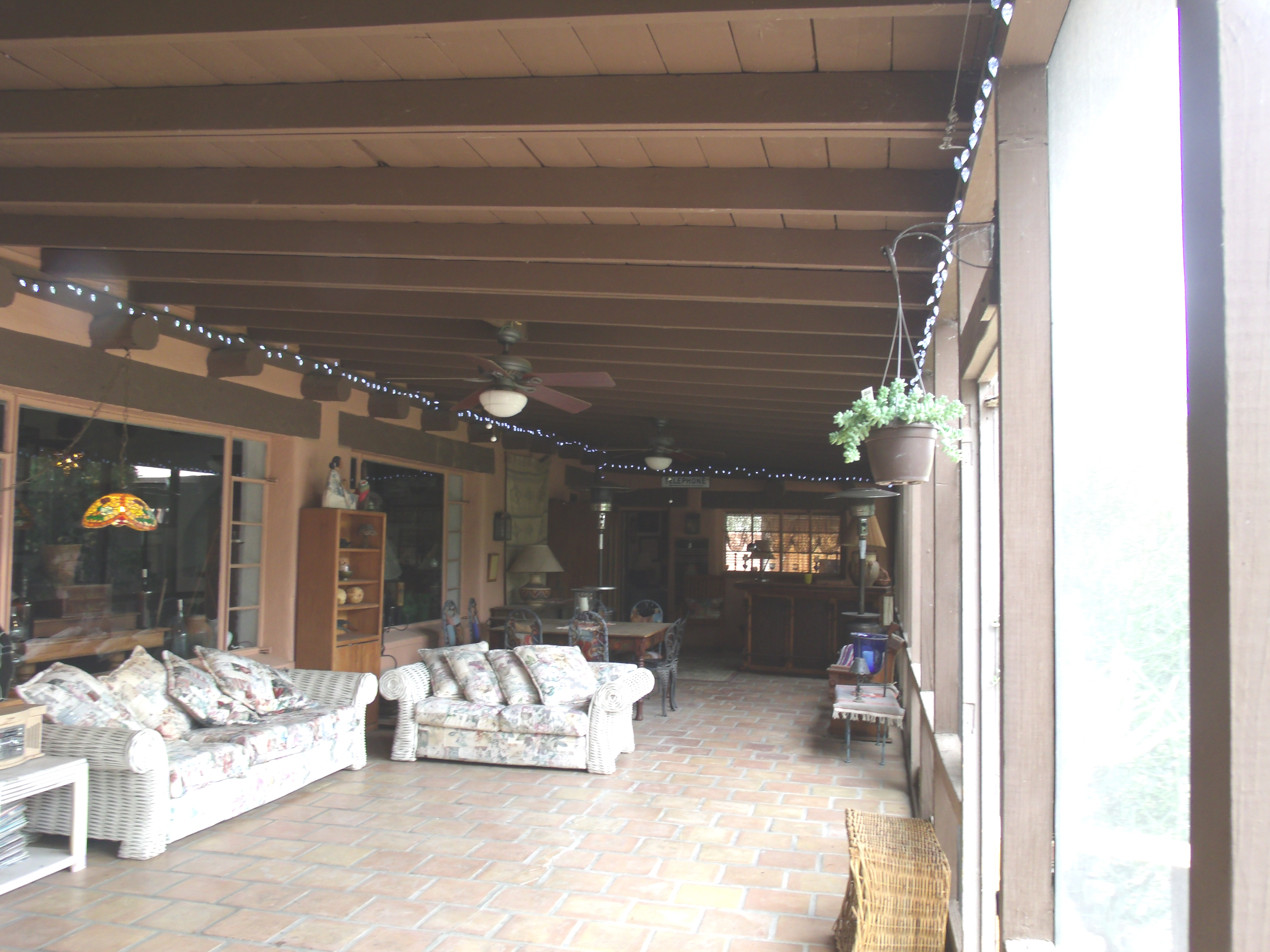
Room of the original 1937 Squaw Peak Inn building constructed by the Stopford family.

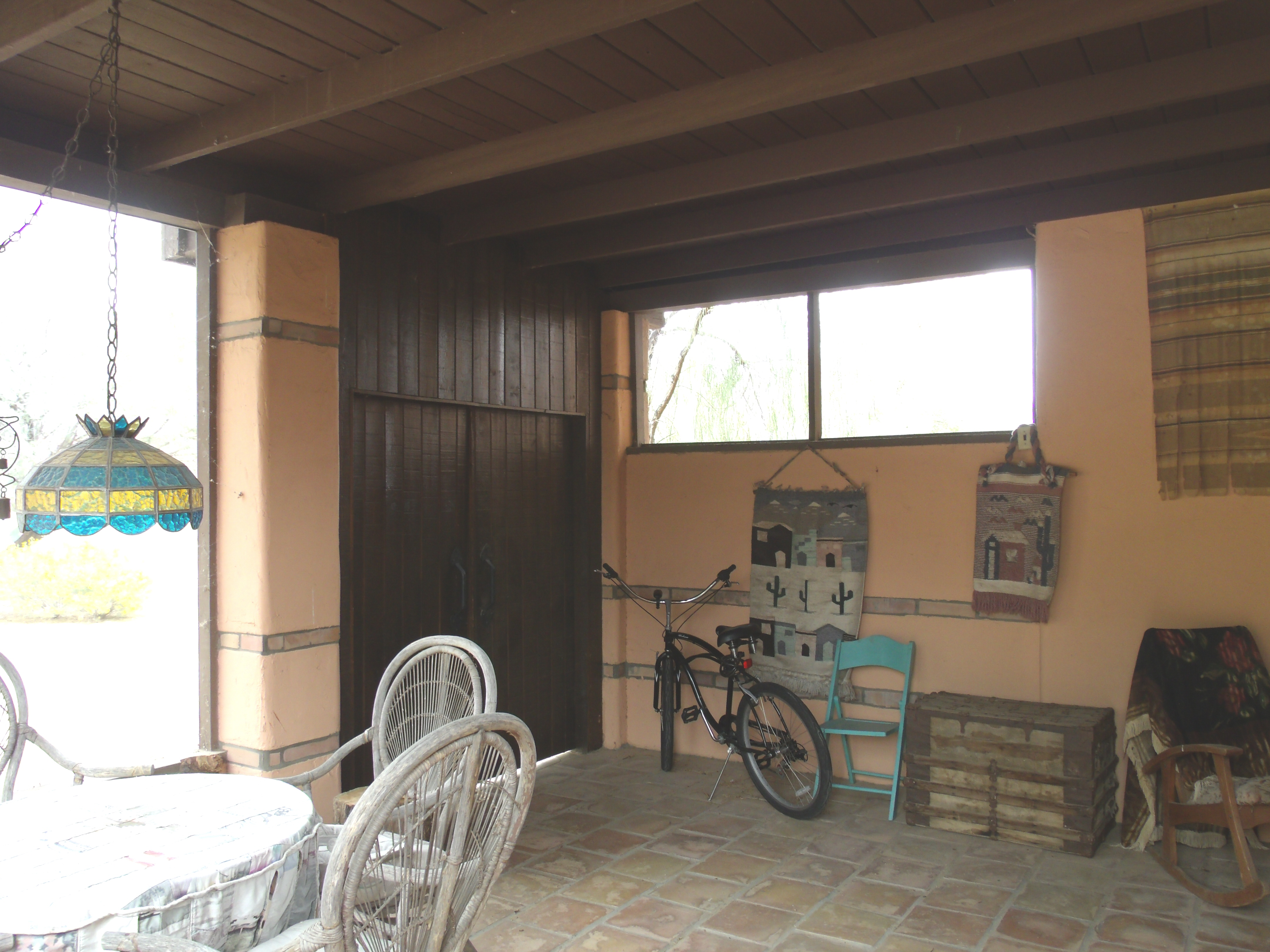
Another room of the original 1937 Squaw Peak Inn building constructed by the Stopford family.

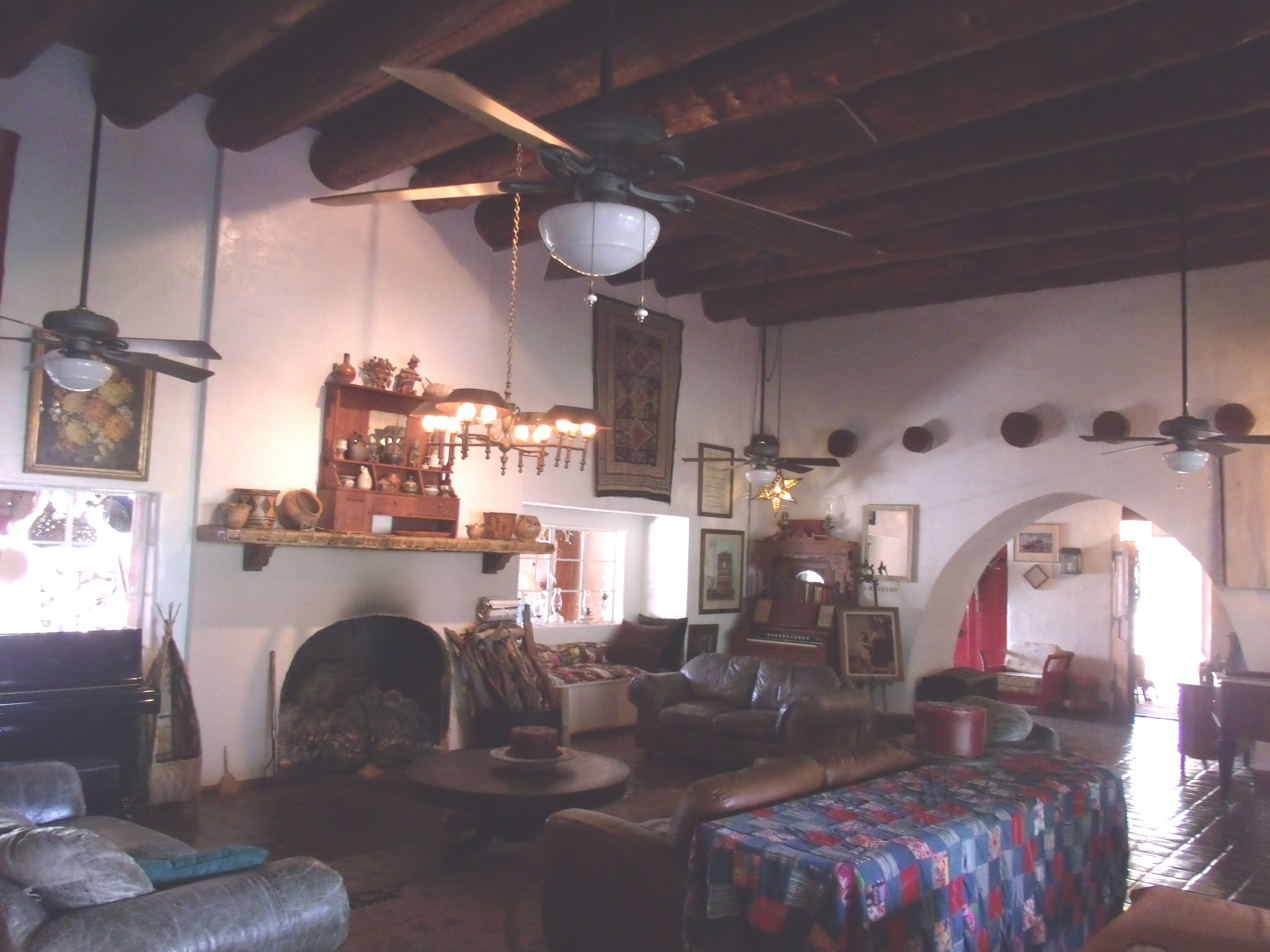
One of the rooms inside the historic Squaw Peak Inn.

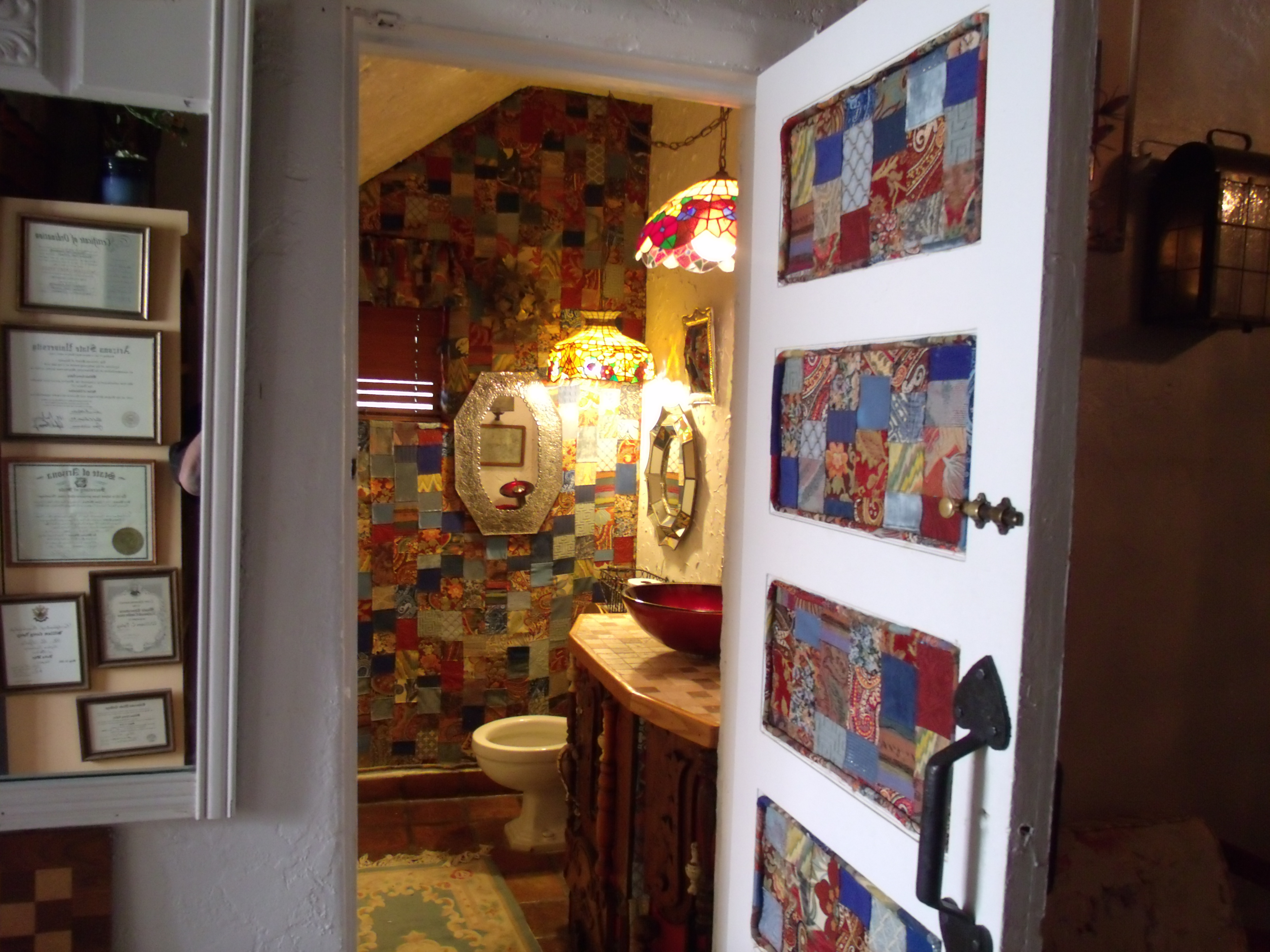
Restored and modernized bathroom inside the historic Squaw Peak Inn.

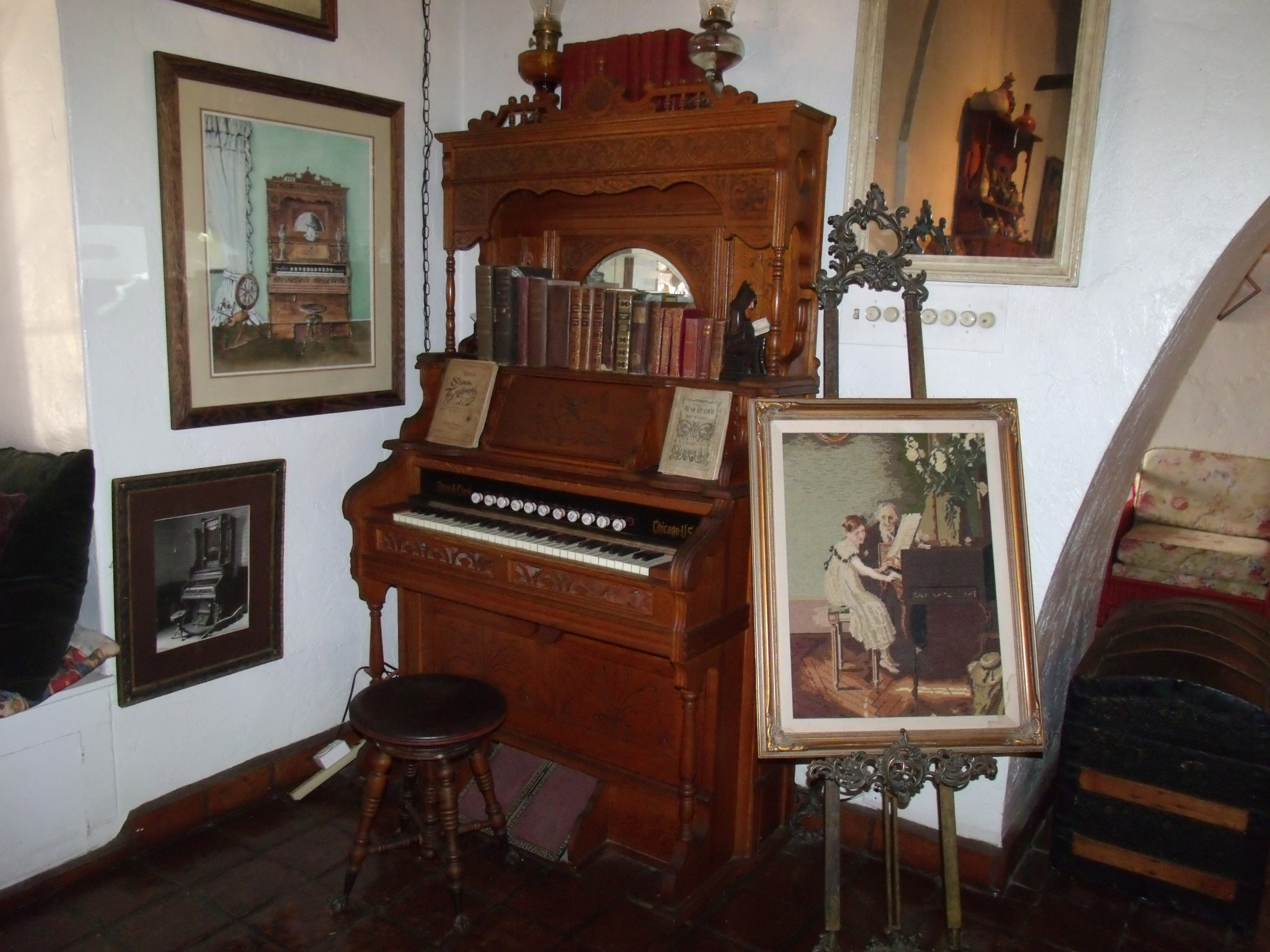
Early 19th-century organ in the main room of Squaw Peak Inn.

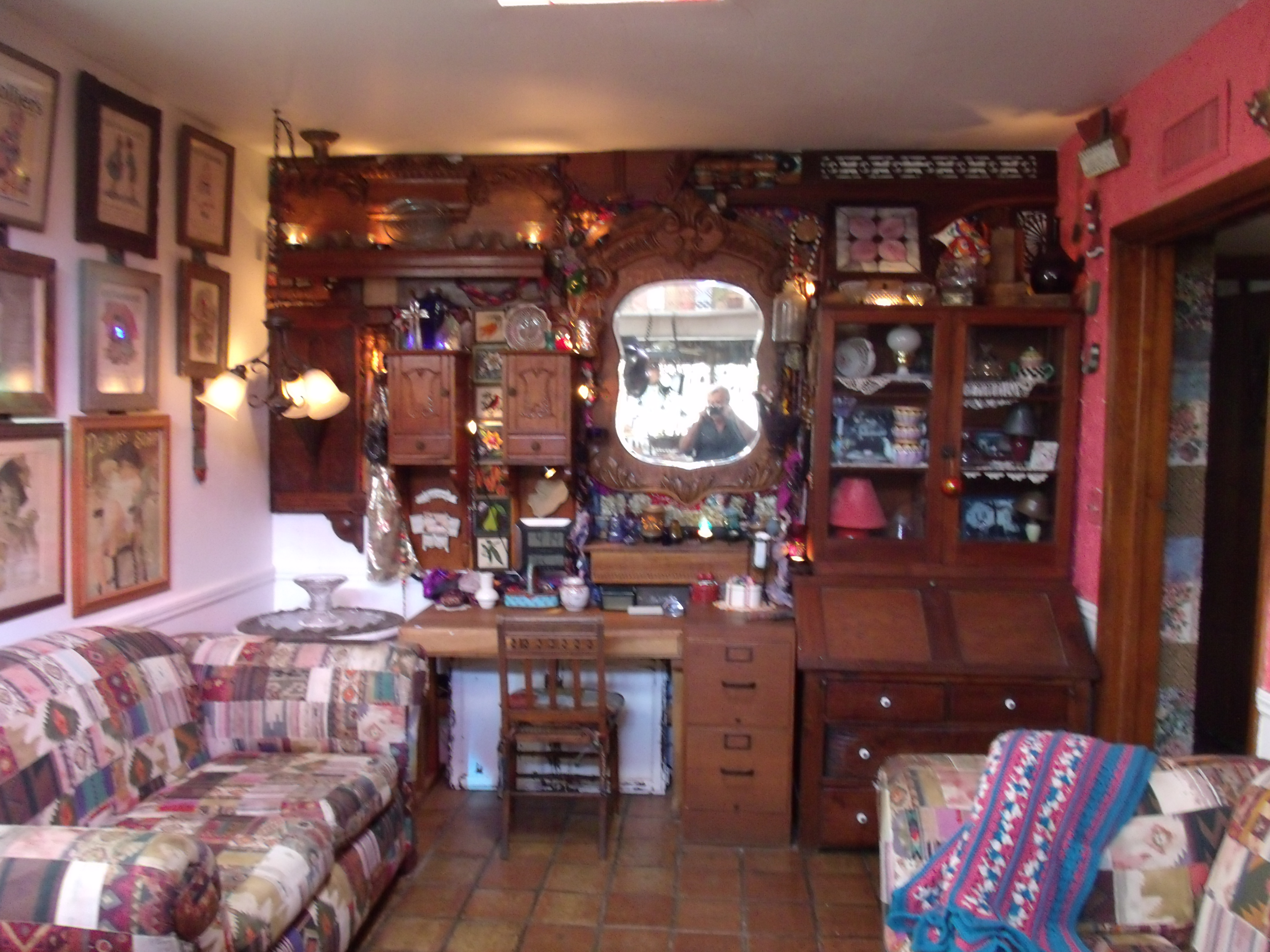
Wall decoration created by Ann Epley in the Squaw Peak Inn.

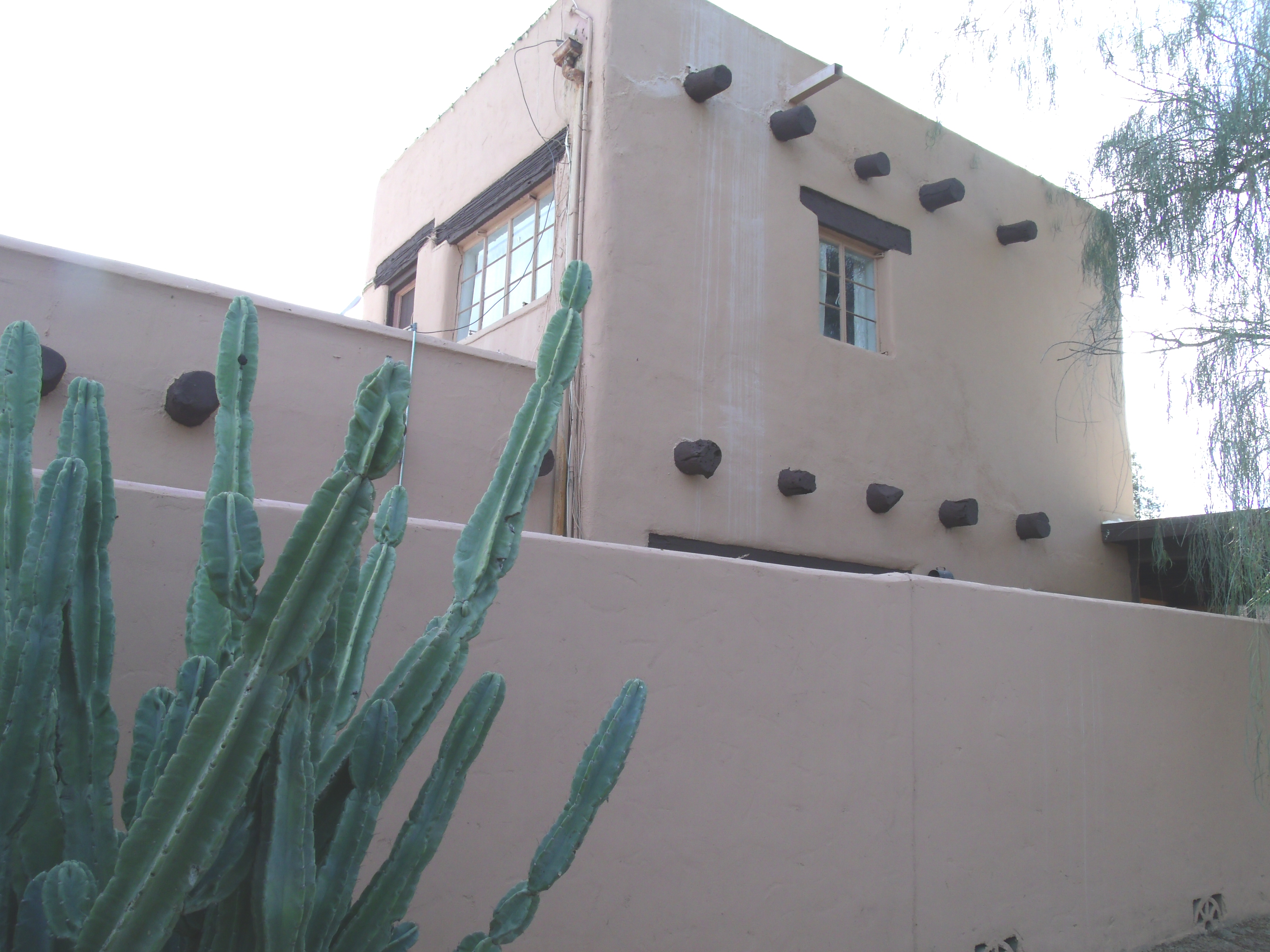
View of the outside of second floor of the Squaw Peak Inn

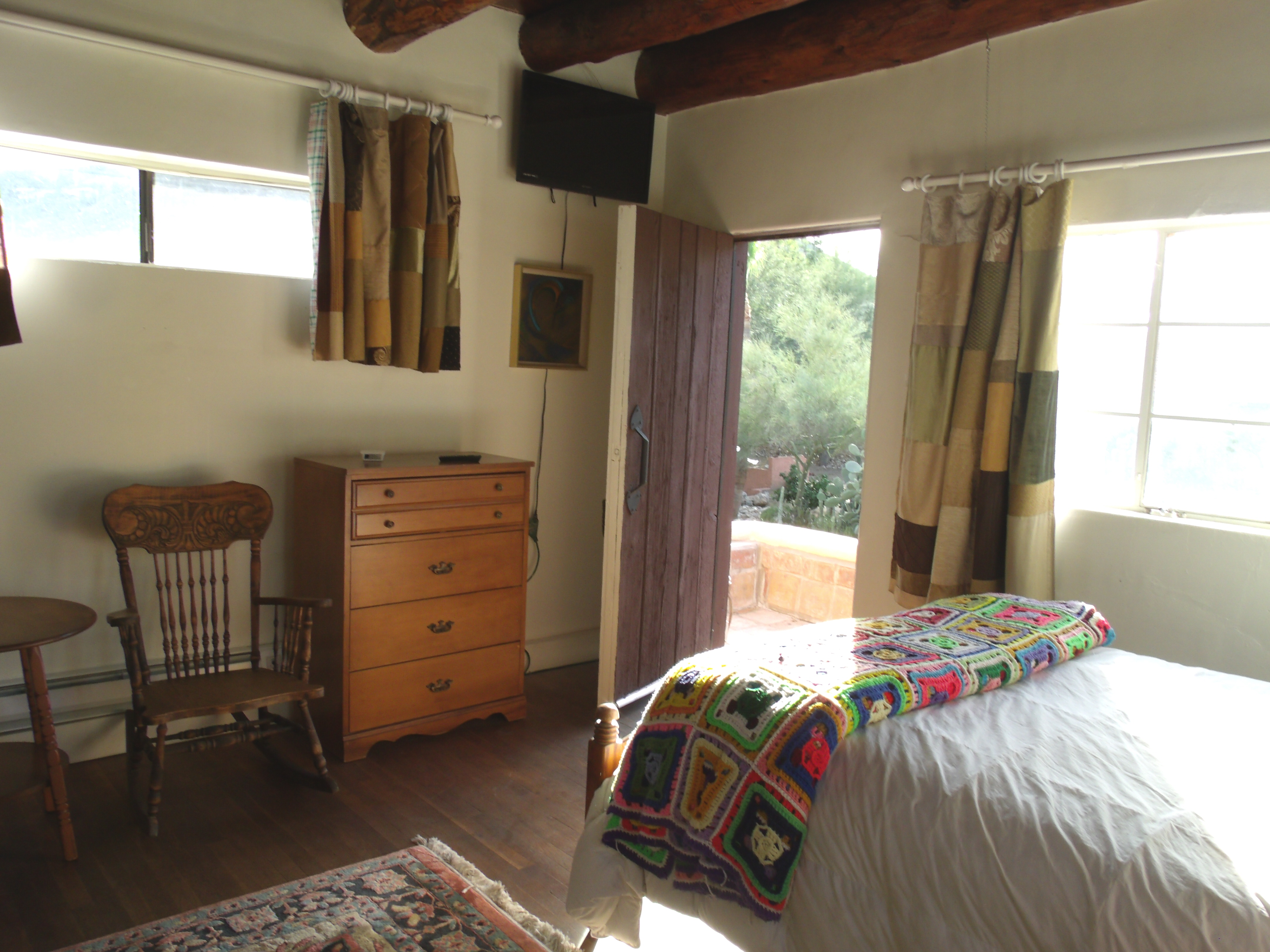
Room in the second floor of the Squaw Peak Inn.

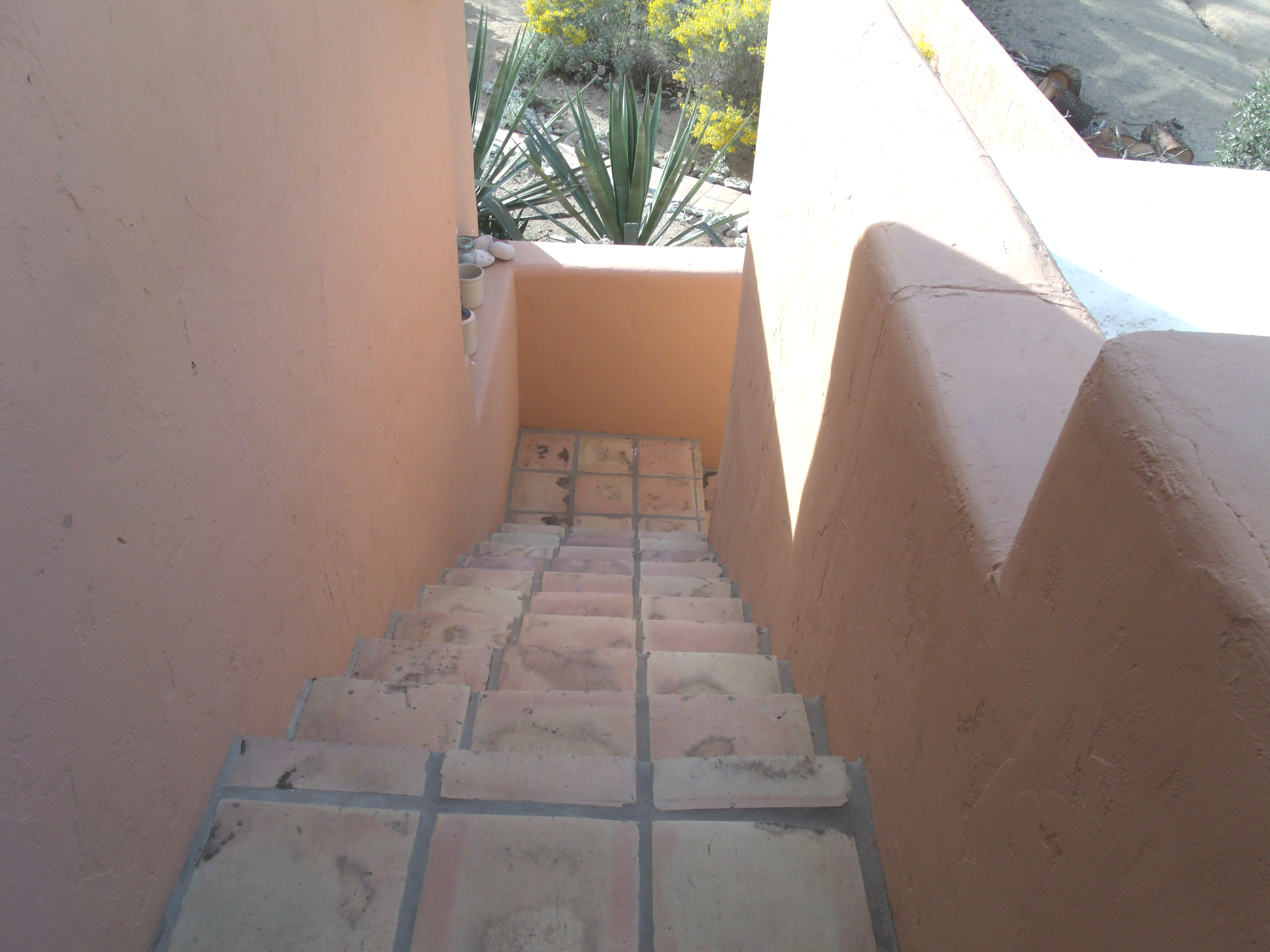
The stairs leading downstairs from the second floor of the Squaw Peak Inn.

=== Westward Ho Hotel ===
Historic Westward Ho Hotel
Listed in the National Register of Historic Places

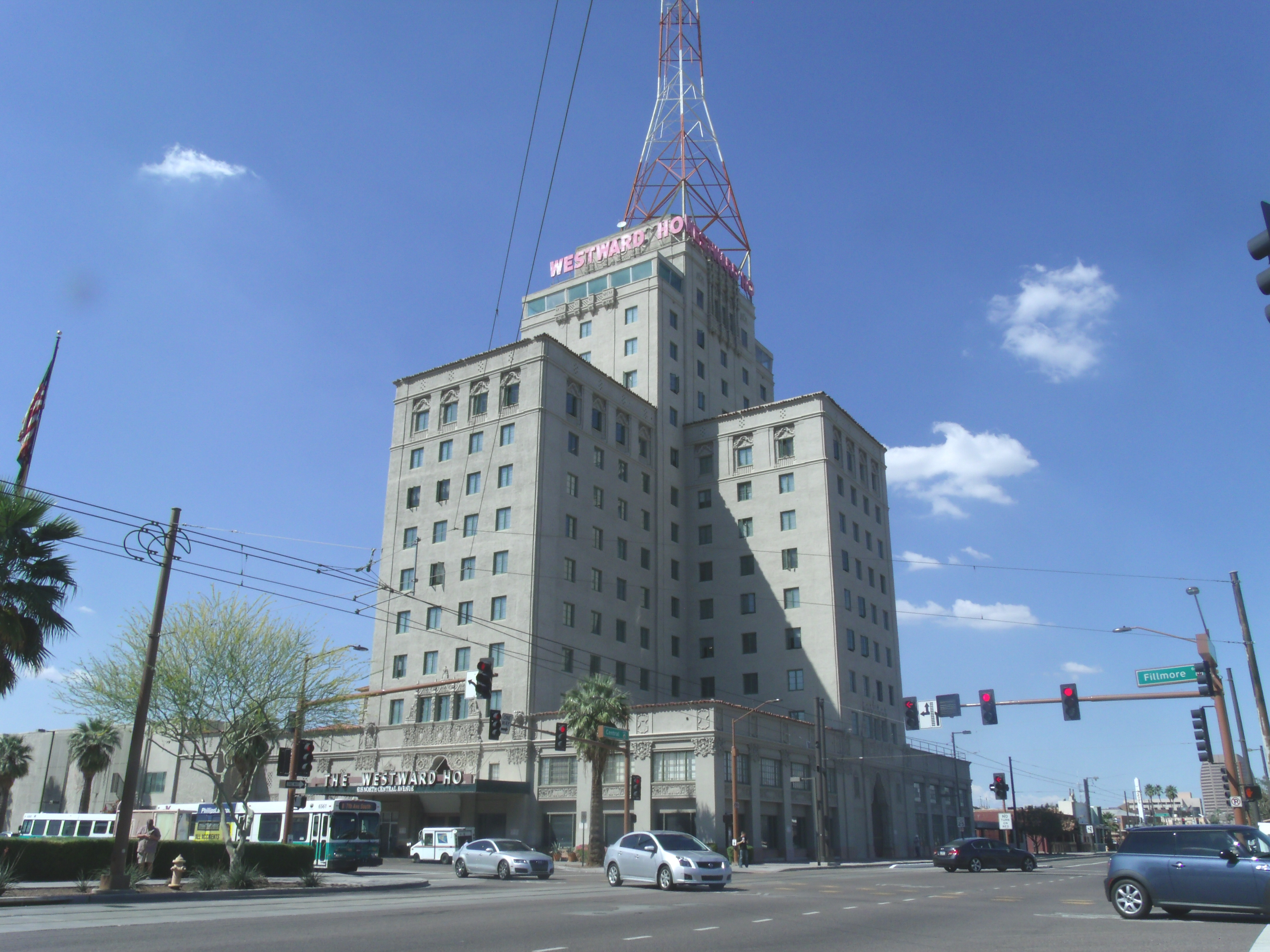
Westward Ho Hotel.

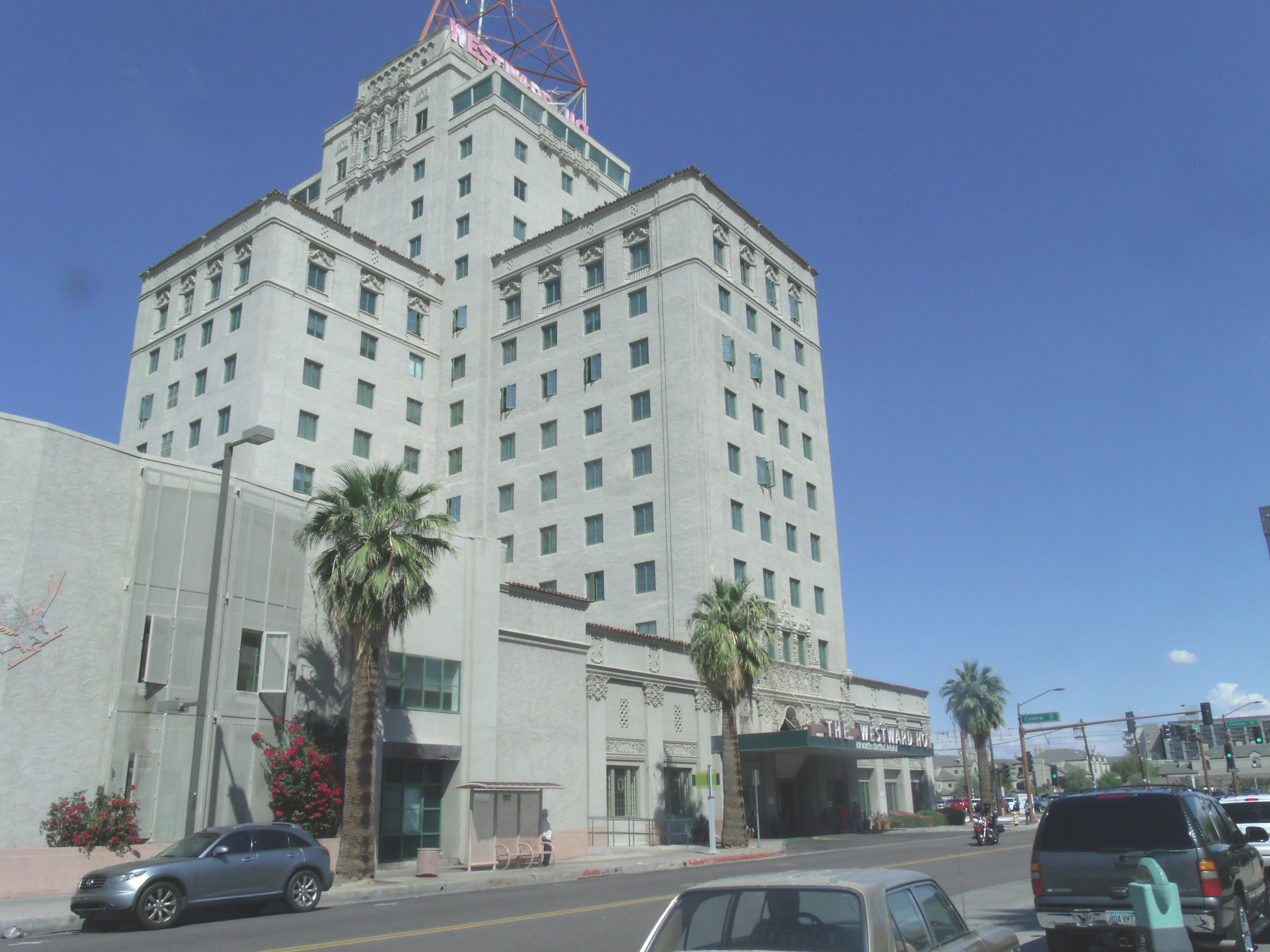
Different view of Westward Ho Hotel. The Westward Ho Hotel was built in 1928 and is located at 618 N. Central Avenue. It was listed in the National Register of Historic Places on February 19, 1982. ref. #82002082.

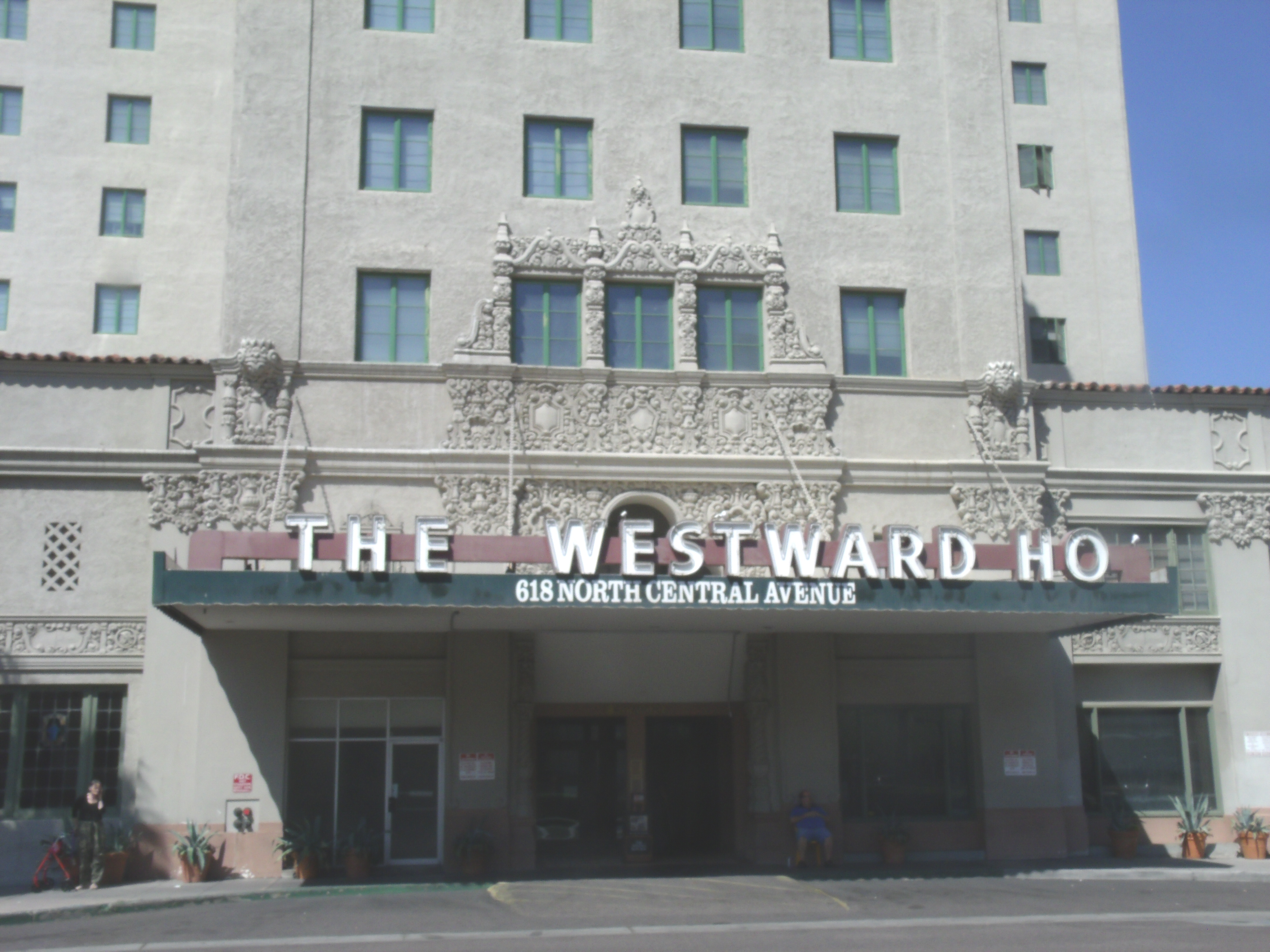
Main entrance of the Westward Ho Hotel. The hotel was built in 1928 and is located at 618 N. Central Avenue. On November 3, 1960, Senator John F. Kennedy made a campaign speech during a Westward Ho Hotel Democratic Breakfast.

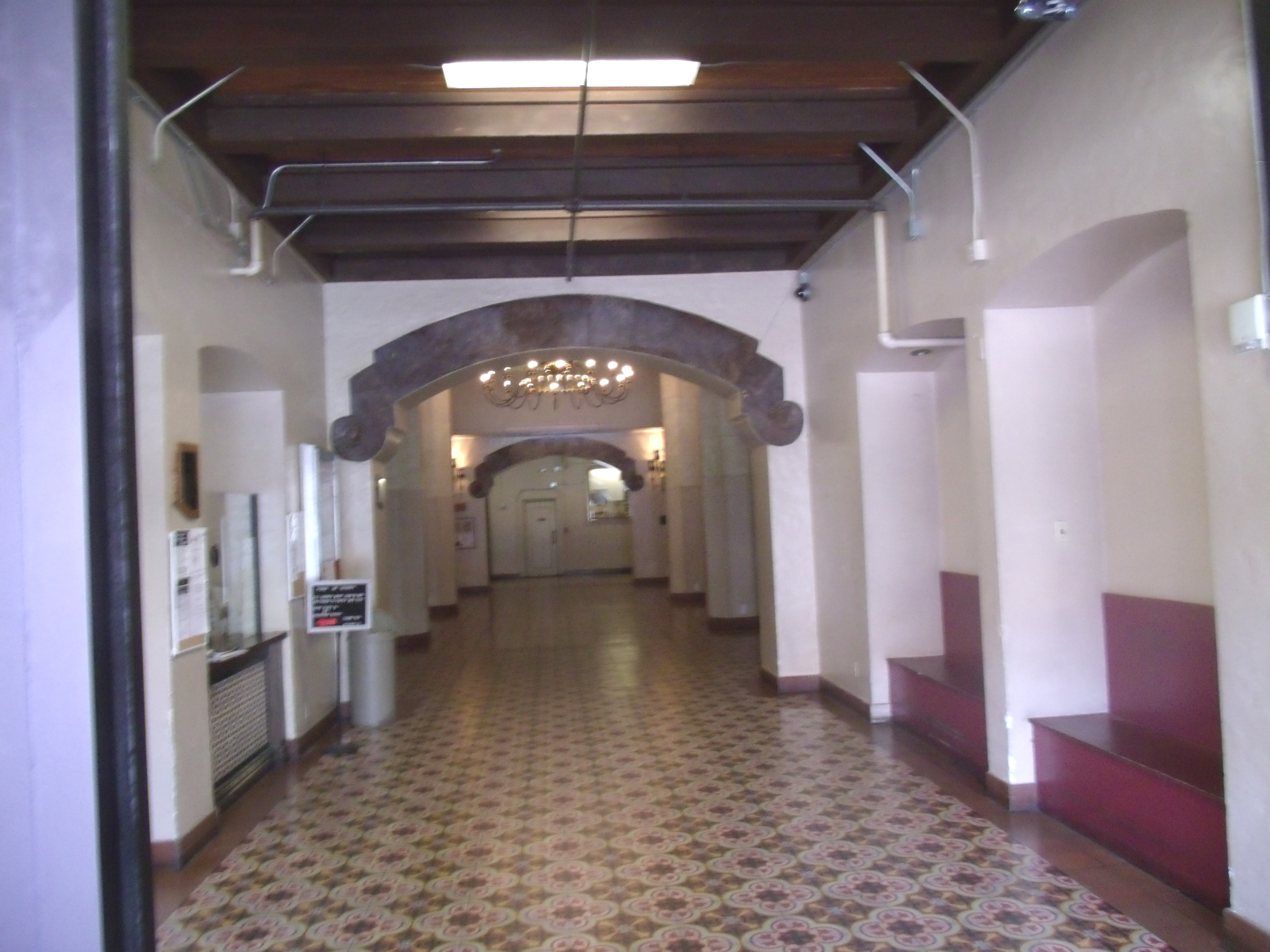
The lobby of the Westward Ho Hotel. The hotel was built in 1928 and is located at 618 N. Central Avenue. Among the notable people who have passed through this lobby are John F. Kennedy, Marilyn Monroe, Paul Newman, Elizabeth Taylor, Nicky Hilton, Roy Rogers, Jackie Gleason, Myrna Loy, Amelia Earhart, Esther Williams, Danny Thomas, Gary Cooper, Lucille Ball, Clark Gable, Henry Fonda, Bob Hope, Liberace, Lee Marvin, Tyrone Power, Eleanor Roosevelt, Shirley Temple, Al Capone, Spencer Tracy, John Wayne, and Robert Wagner married Natalie Wood on the hotel Patio.

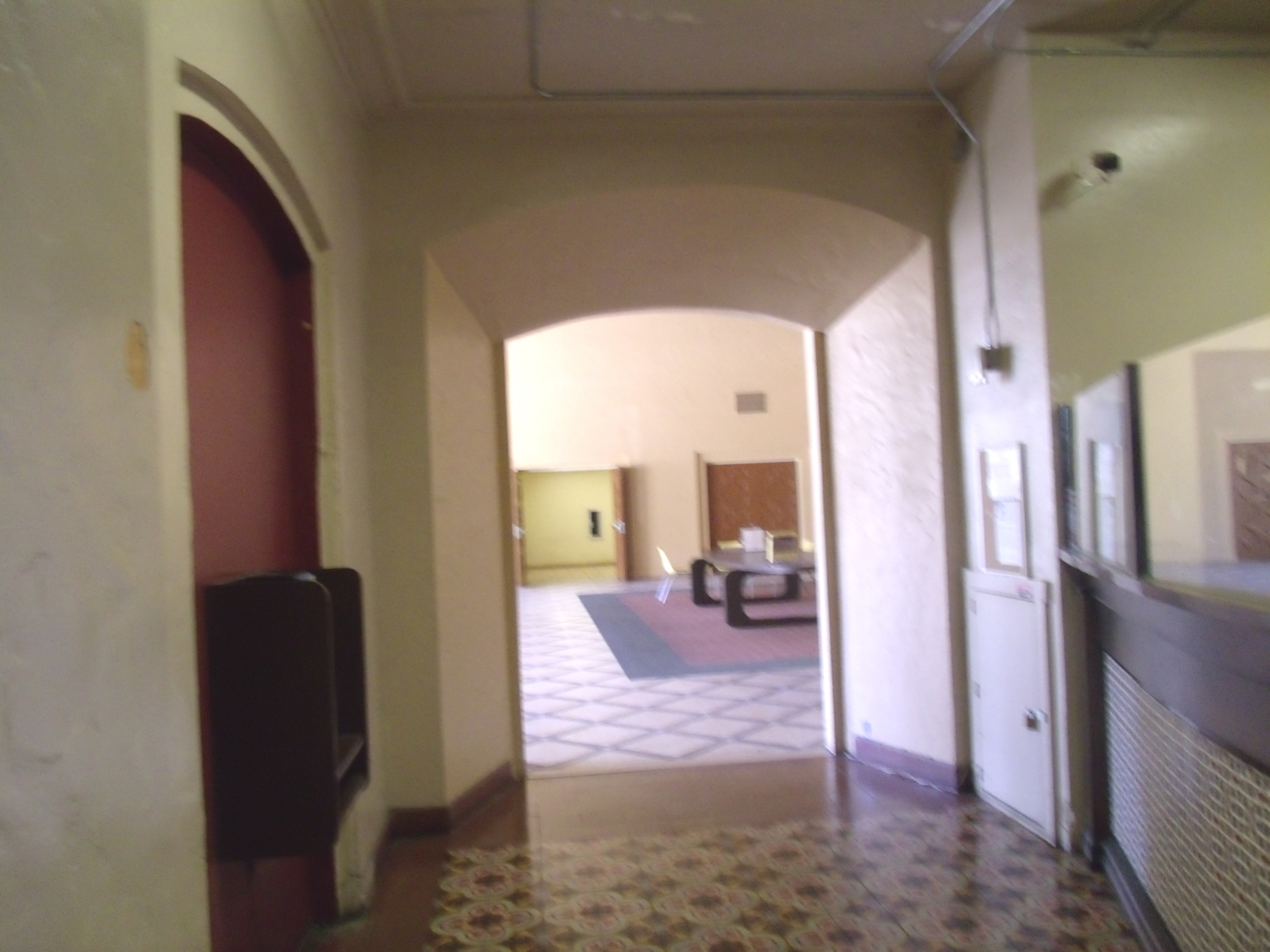
The Grand Dining Room of the Westward Ho Hotel. The hotel was built in 1928 and is located at 618 N. Central Avenue. On November 3, 1960, Senator John F. Kennedy made a campaign speech during a Westward Ho Hotel Democratic Breakfast. The hotel was listed in the National Register of Historic Places on February 10, 1983, reference #83002993.

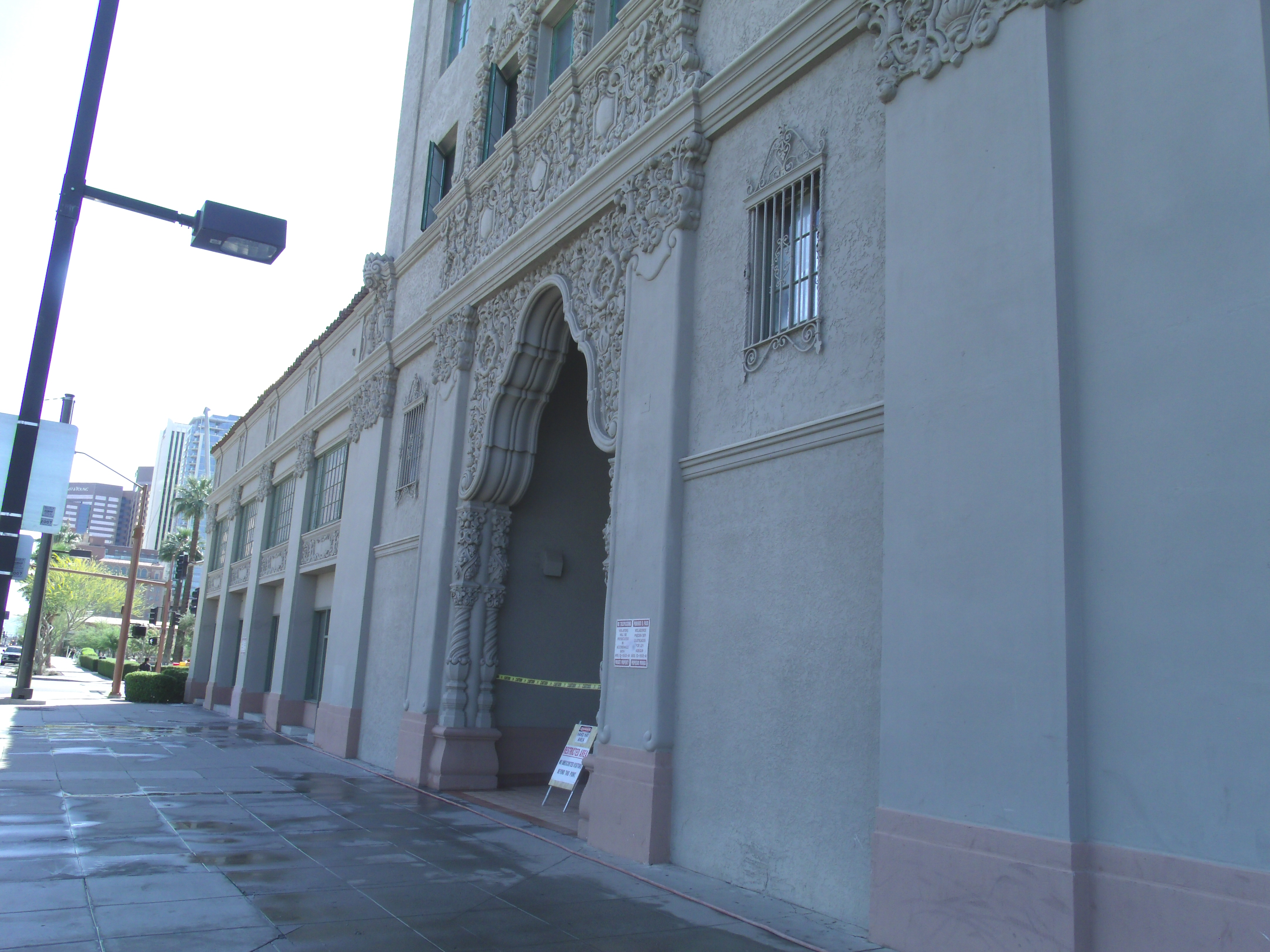
Side entrance of the Westward Ho Hotel.

=== Wrigley Mansion ===
Wrigley Mansion
Listed in the National Register of Historic Places

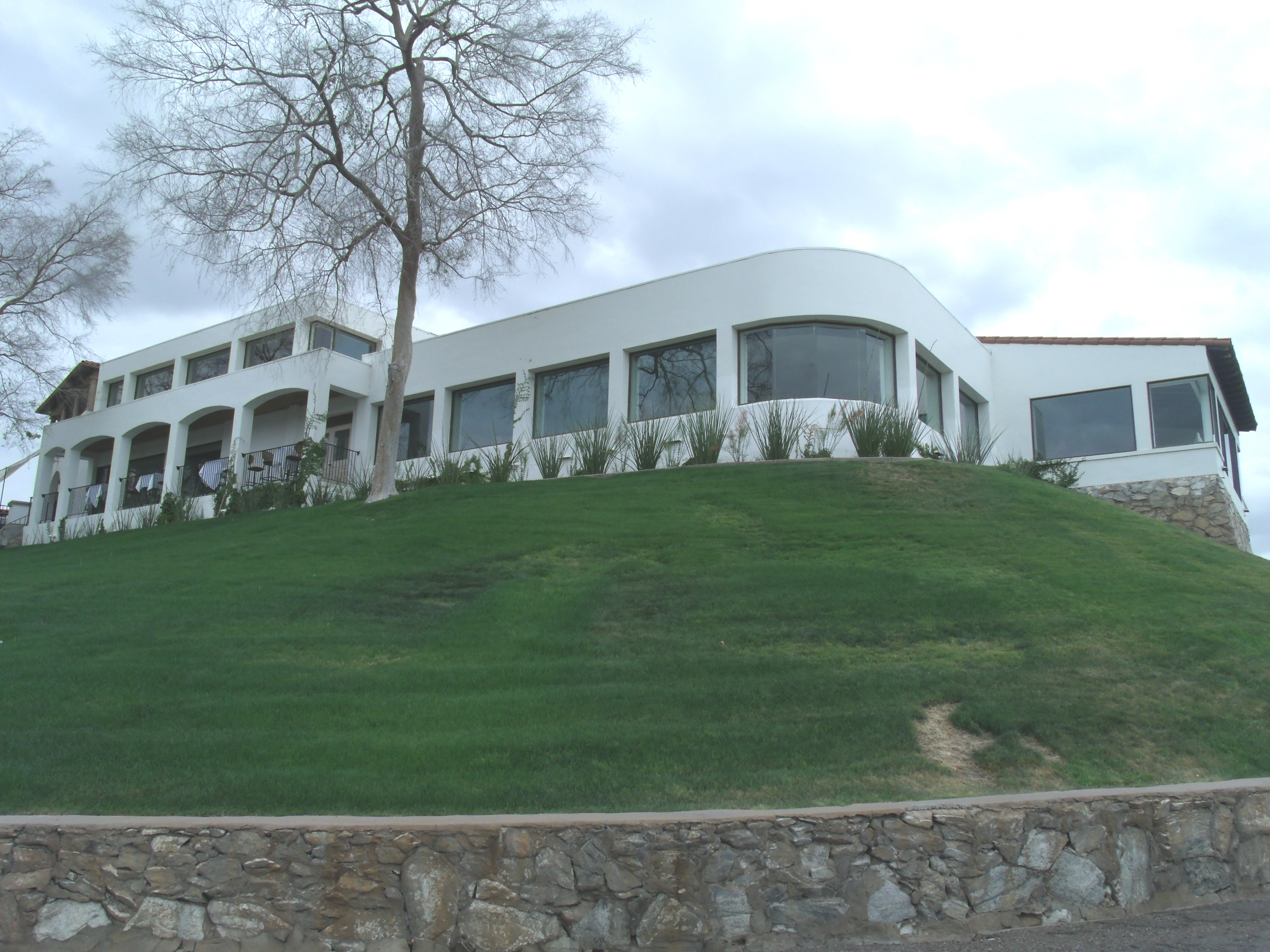
Wrigley Mansion

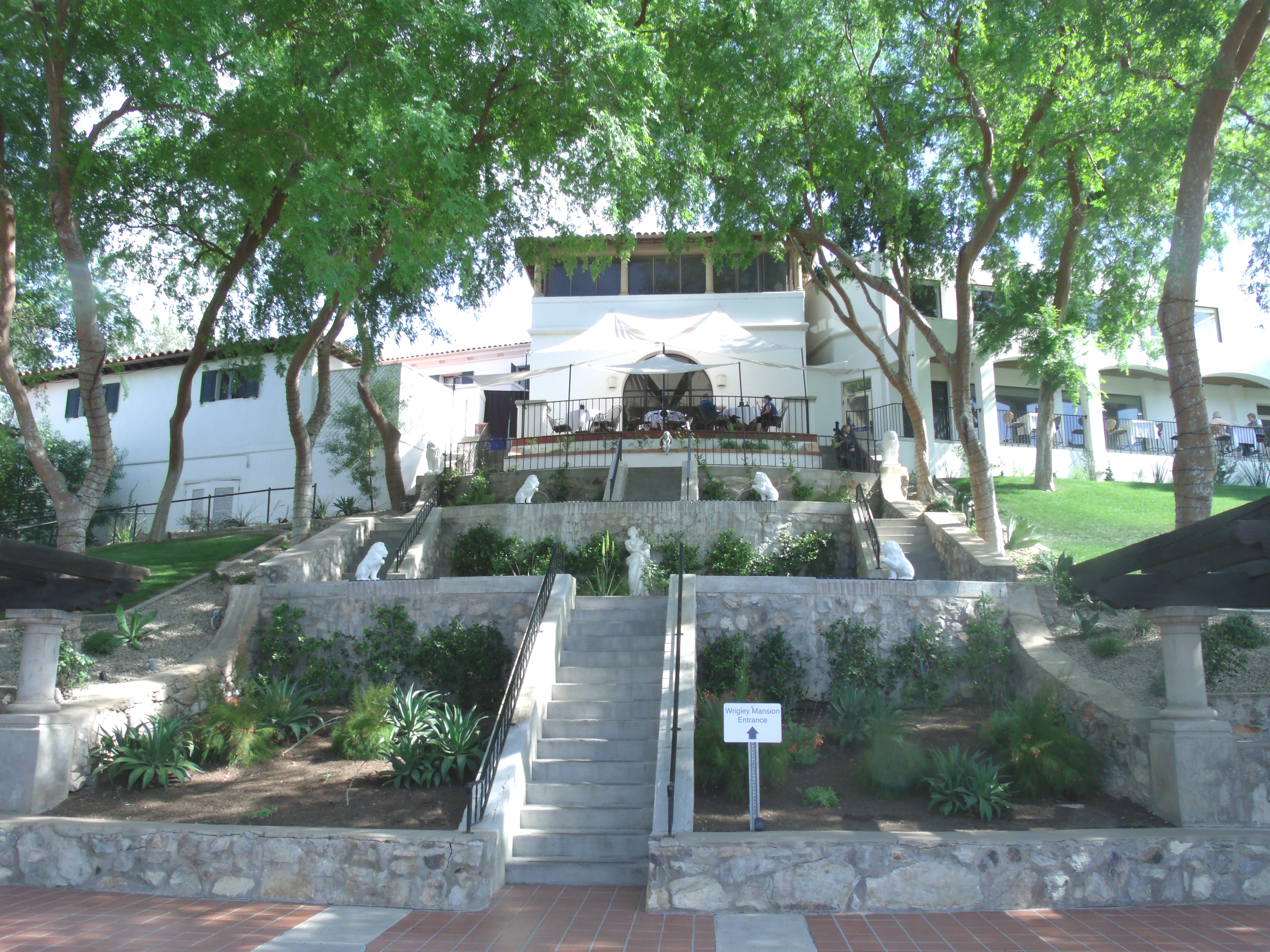
Pedestrian entrance of the Wrigley Mansion.

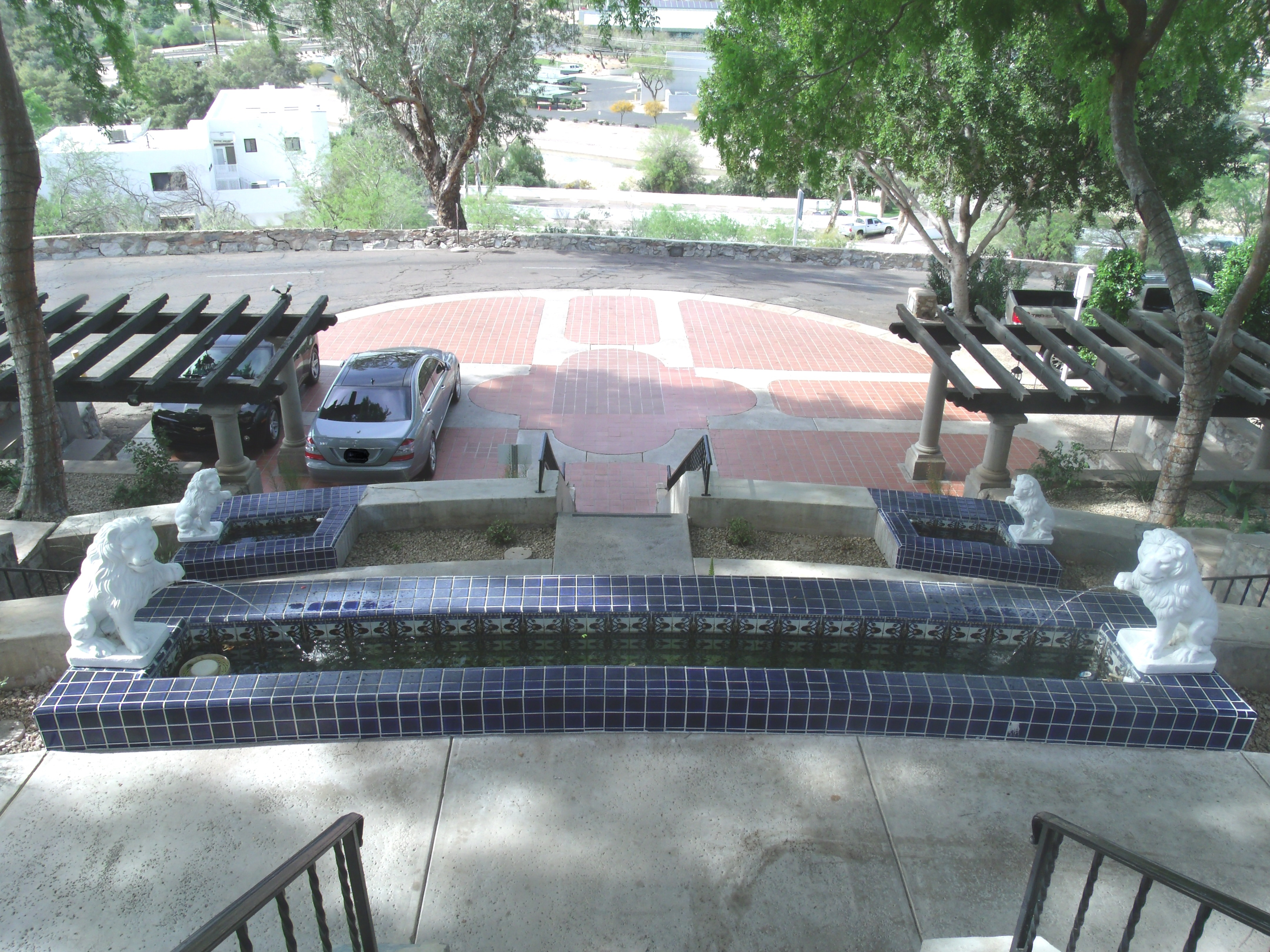
View from the top of the pedestrian entrance of the Wrigley Mansion.

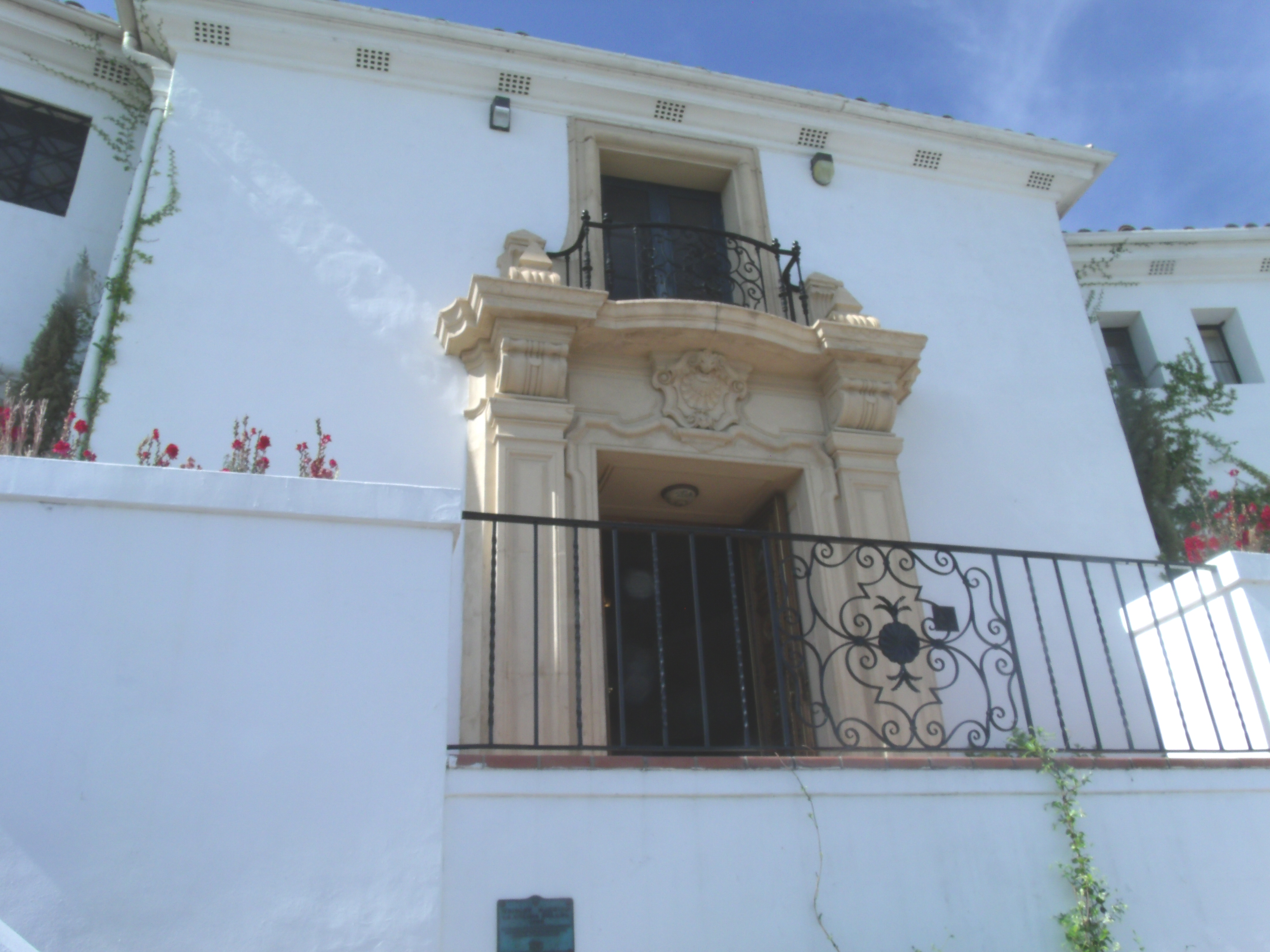
The main entrance of the Wrigley Mansion.

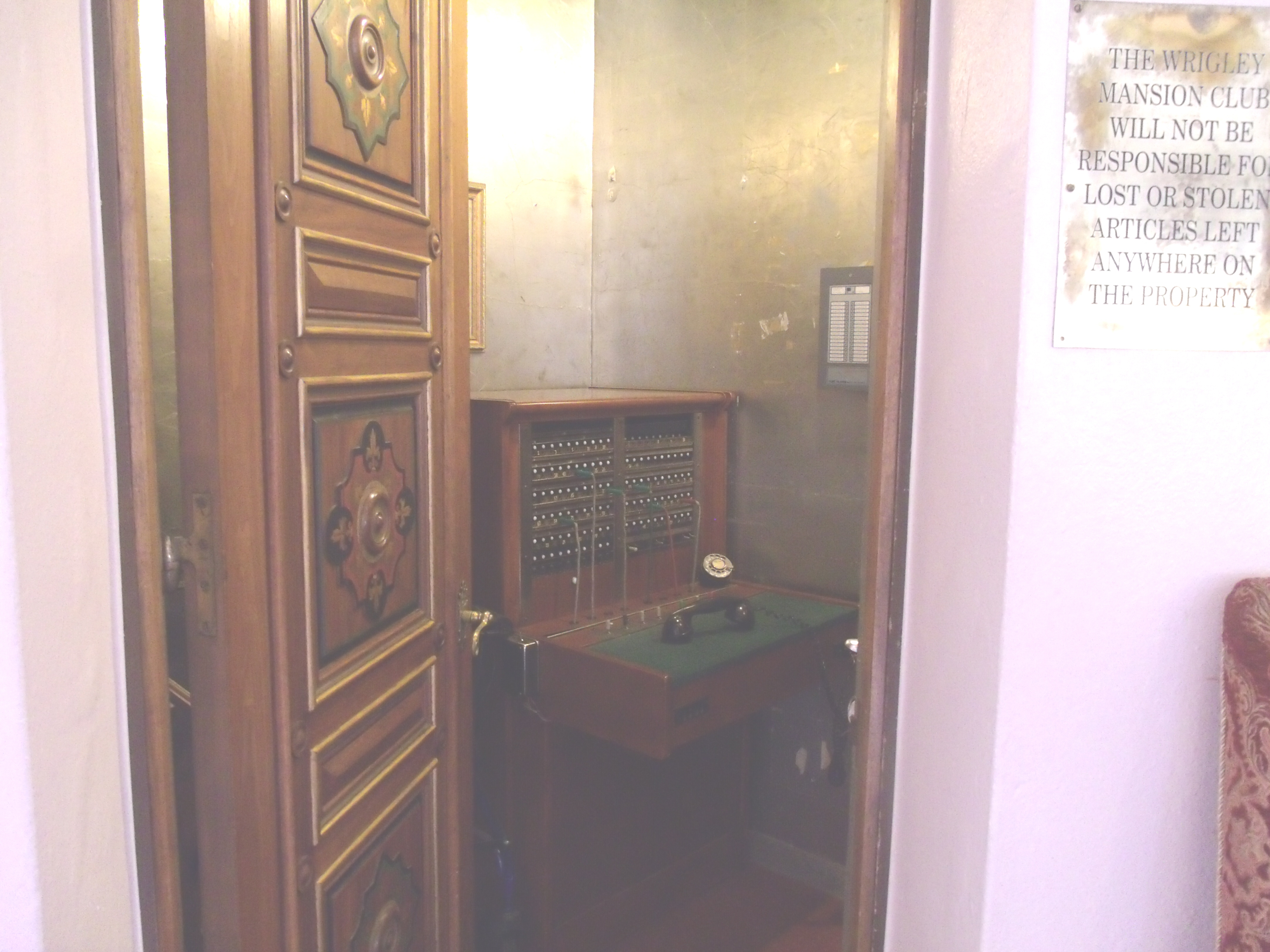
Telephone operator's booth in the Wrigley Mansion

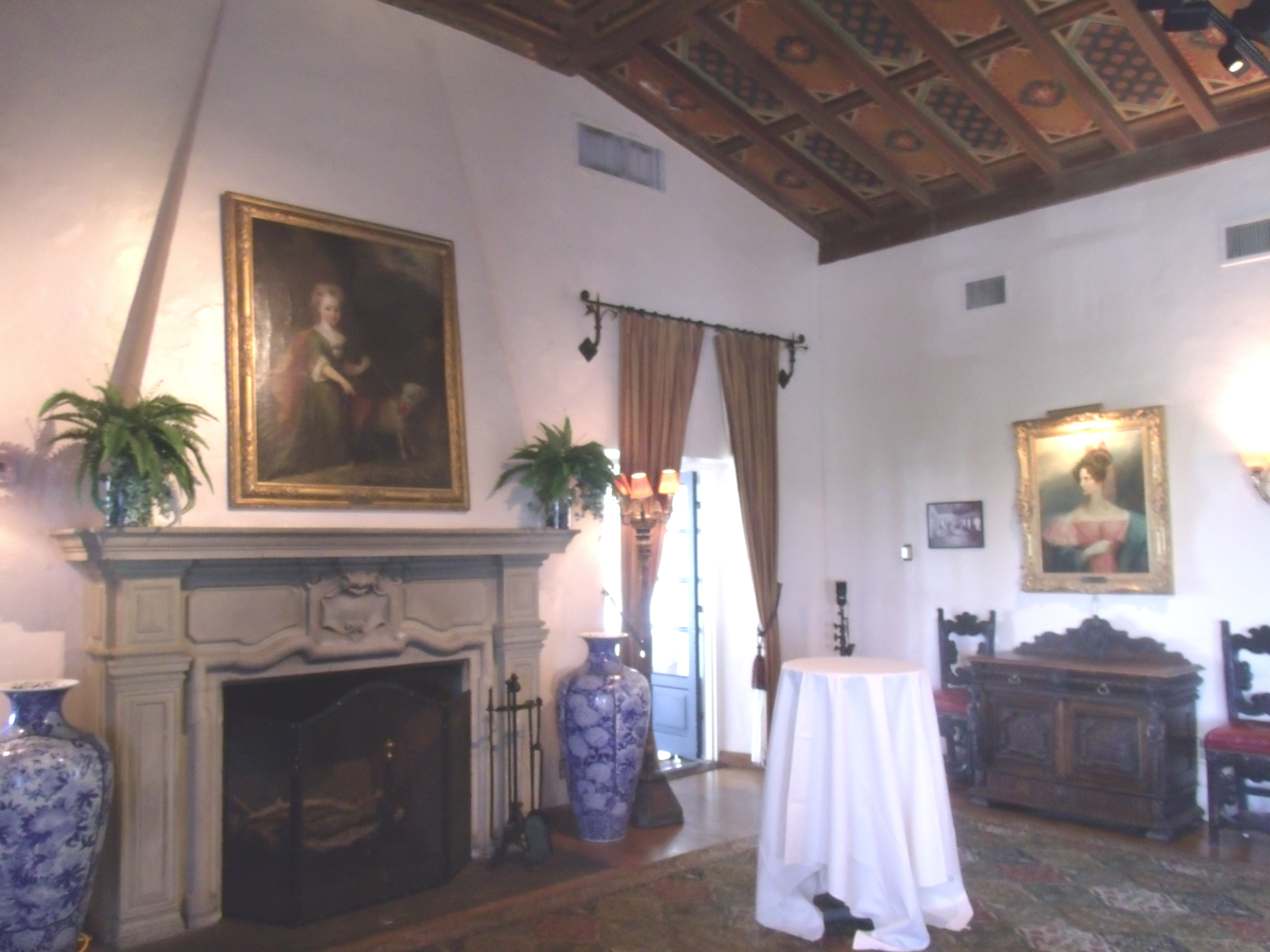
Wrigley Mansion living room.

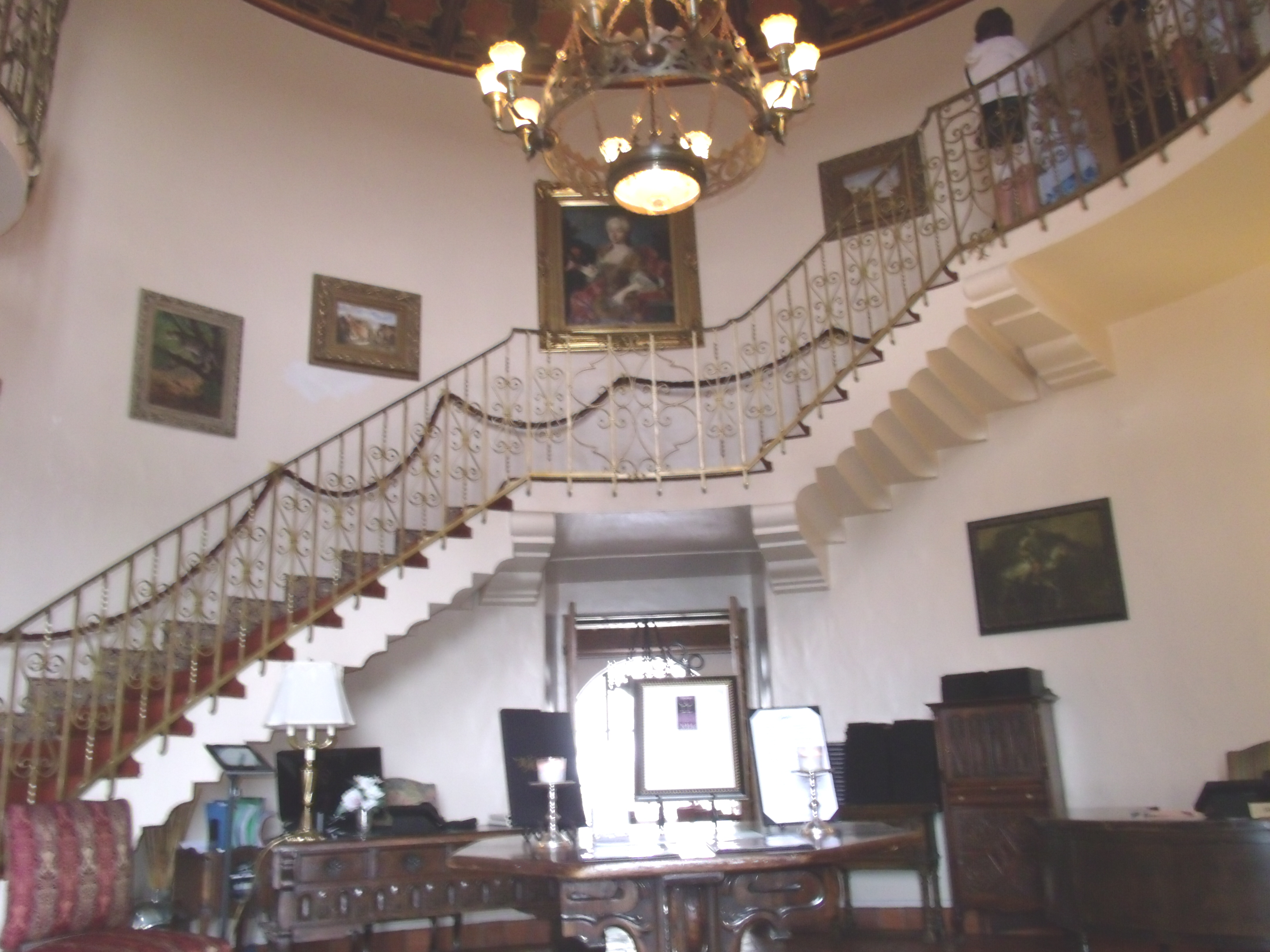
Inside the main entrance of the Wrigley Mansion.

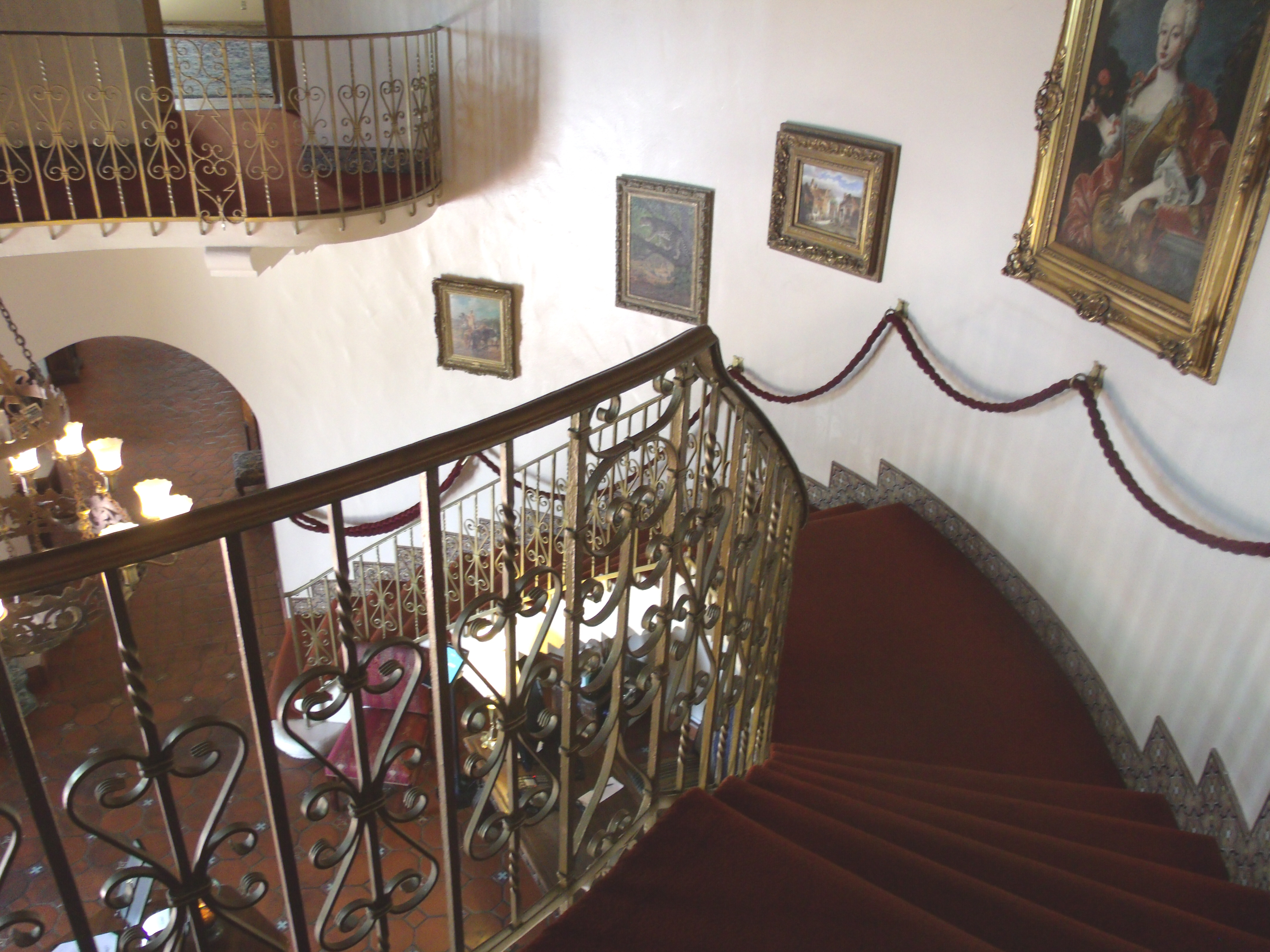
View from the top of the staircase inside the Wrigley Mansion.

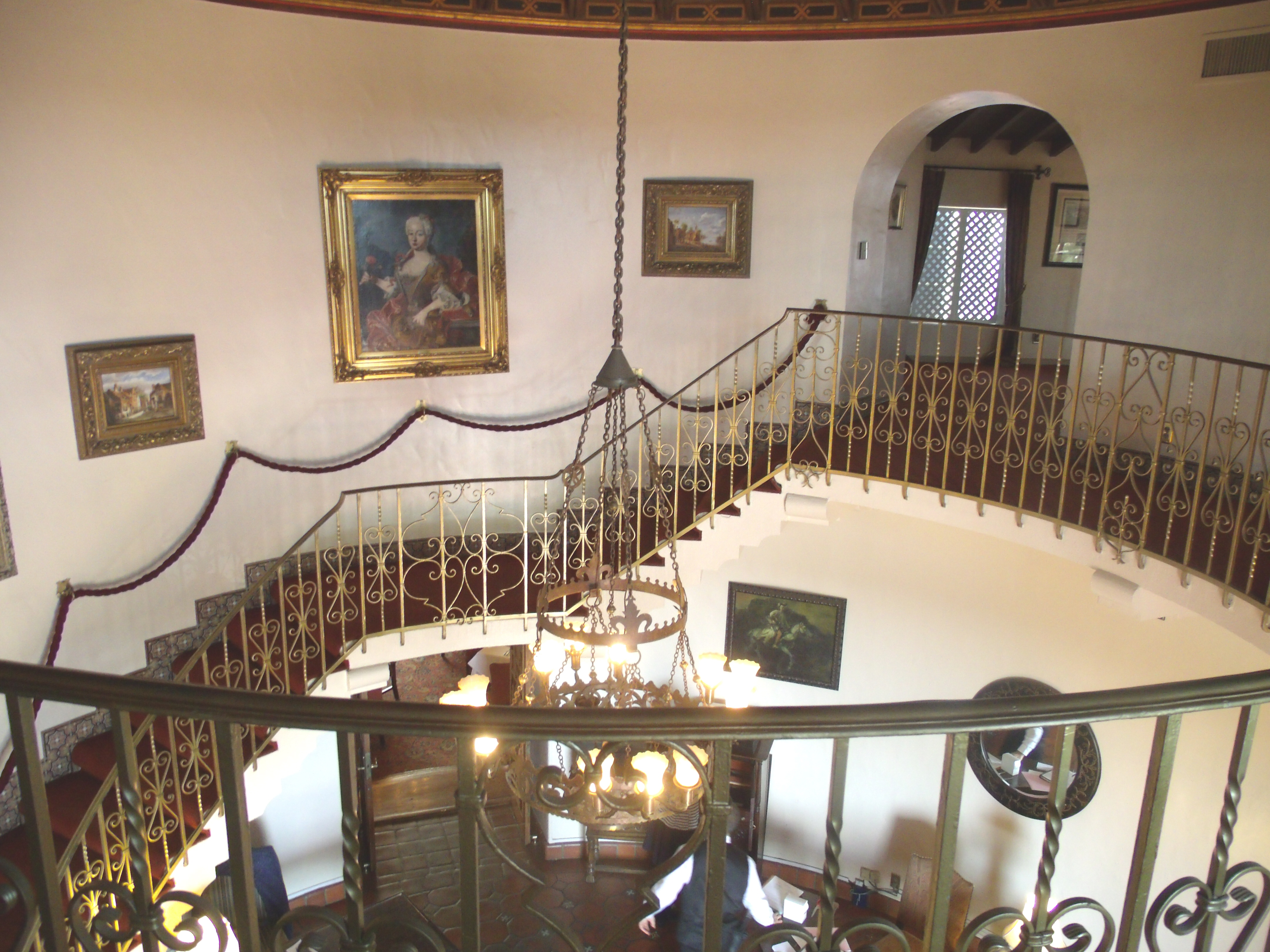
Different view from the top of the staircase inside the Wrigley Mansion.

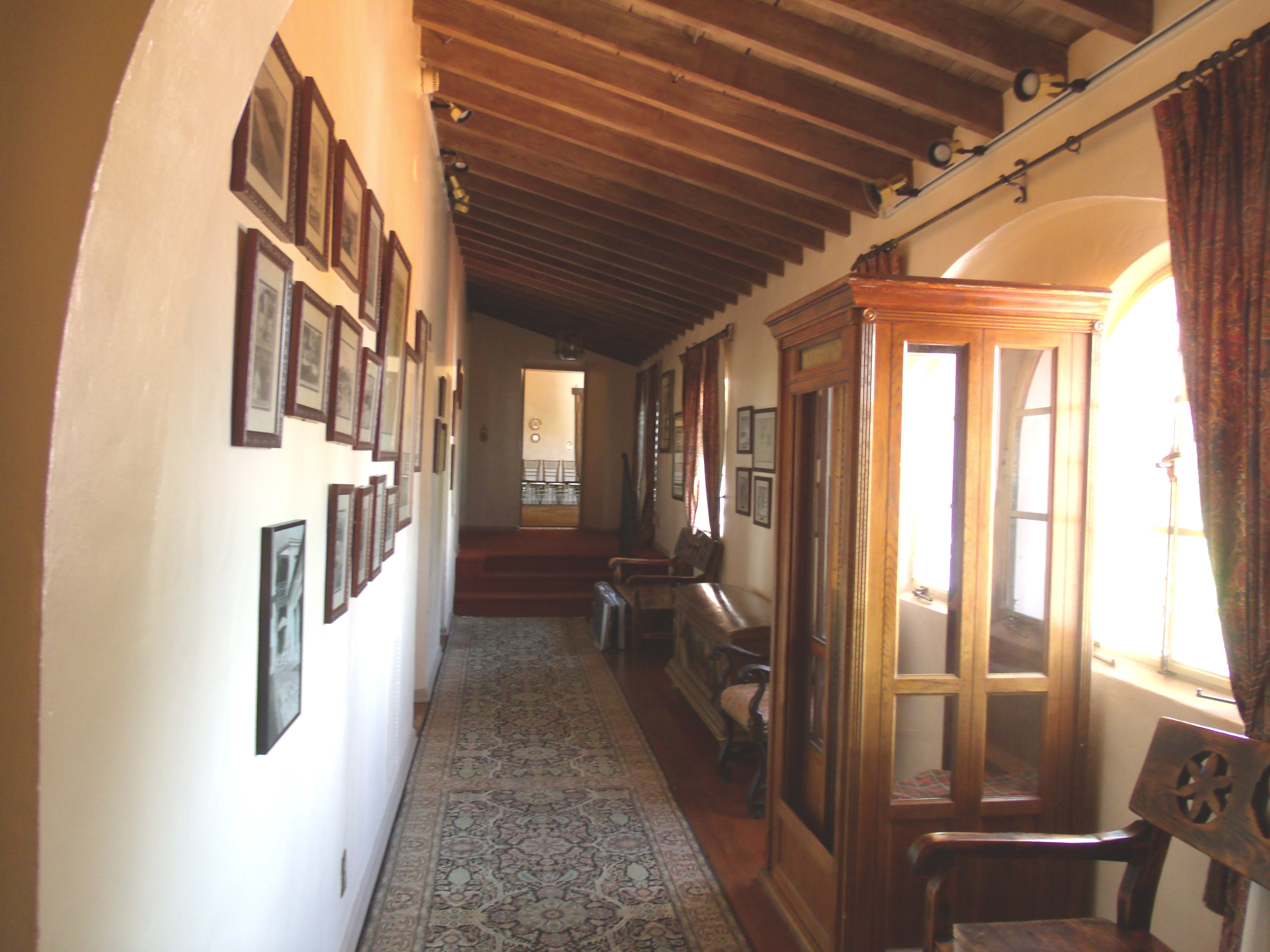
Wrigley Mansion hallway.

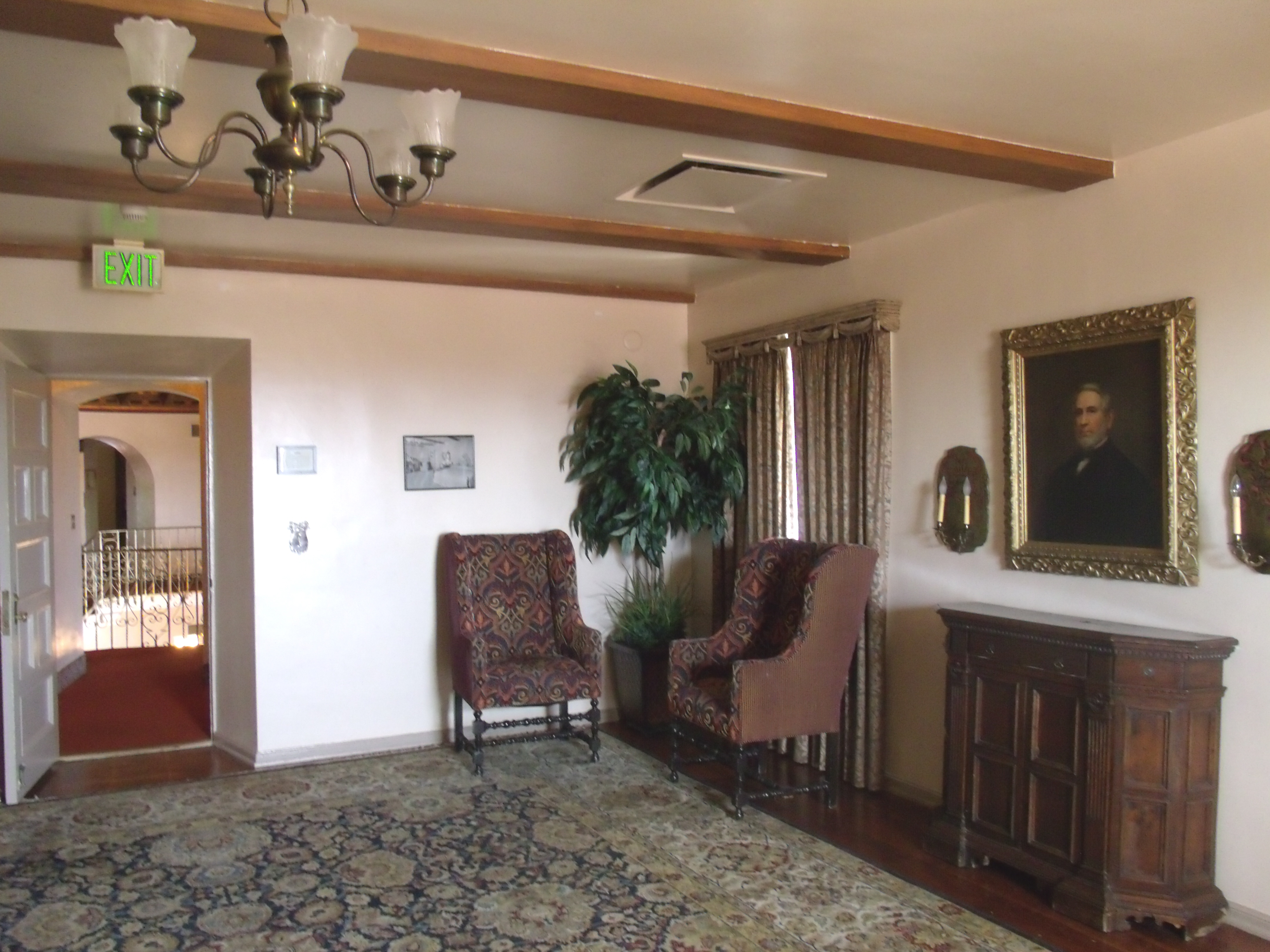
Room in the second floor of the Wrigley Mansion.

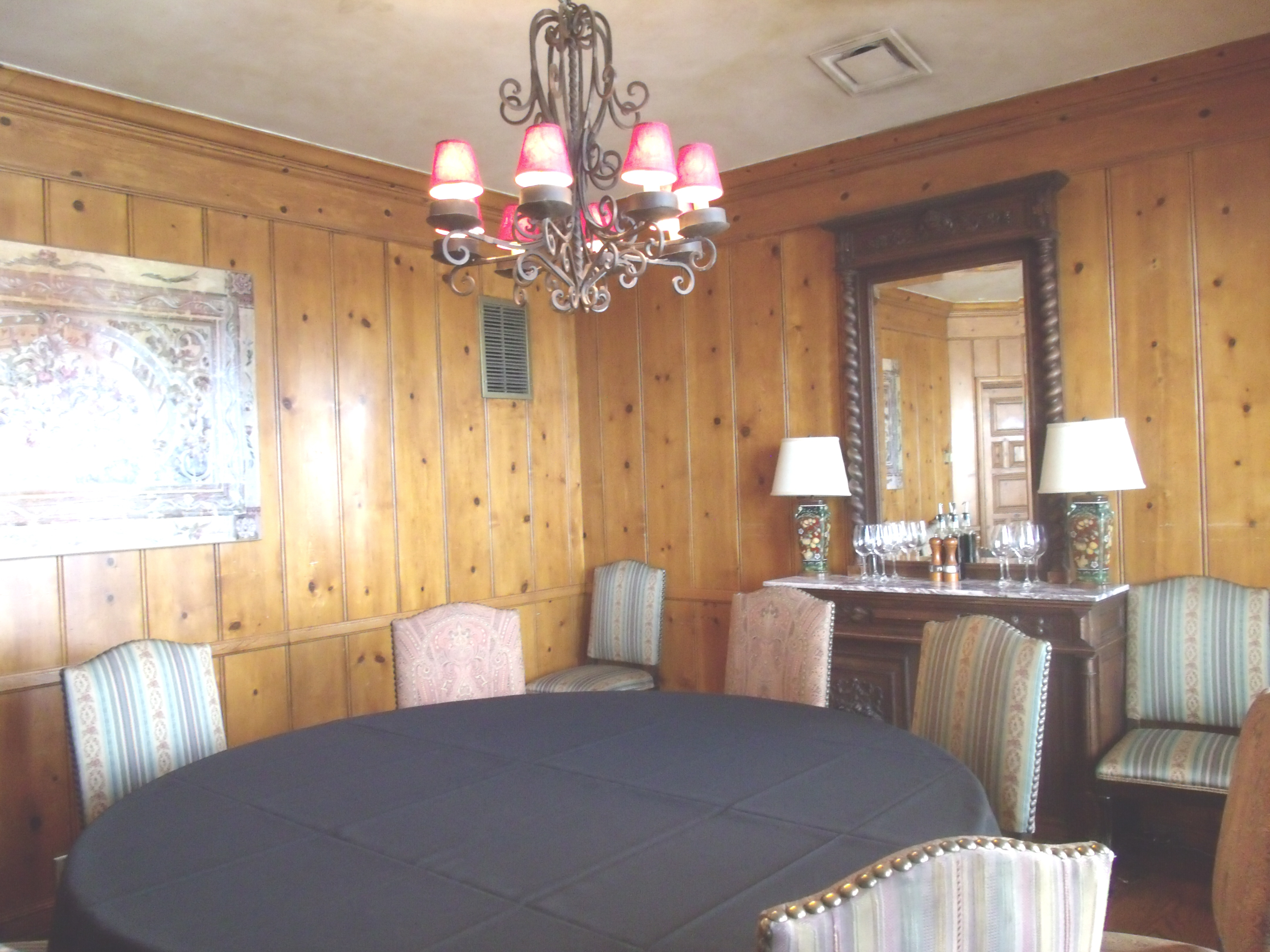
Another room in the second floor of the Wrigley Mansion.

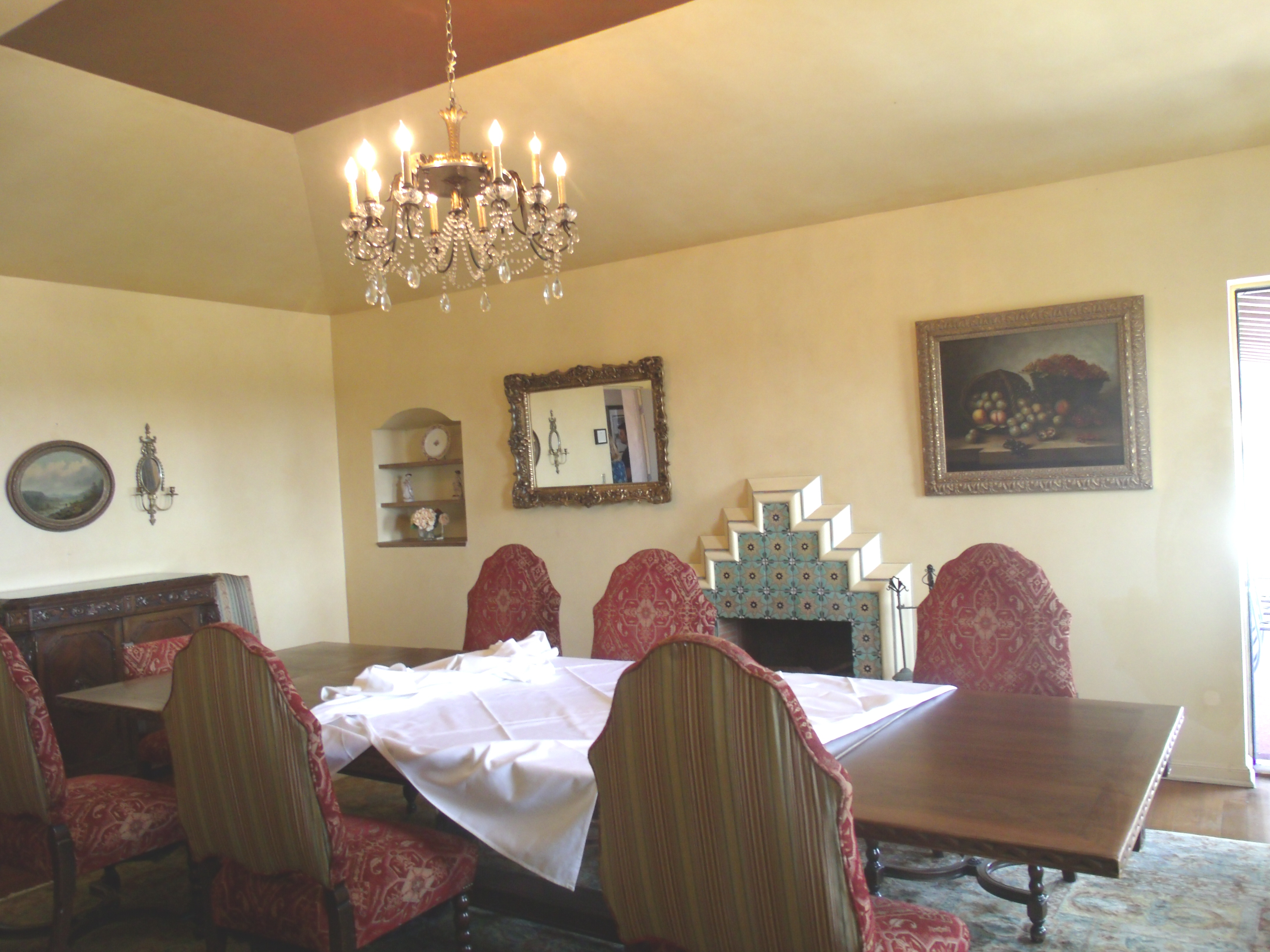
This was once the bedroom in the Wrigley Mansion where, according to the owners, Elvis Presley stayed.

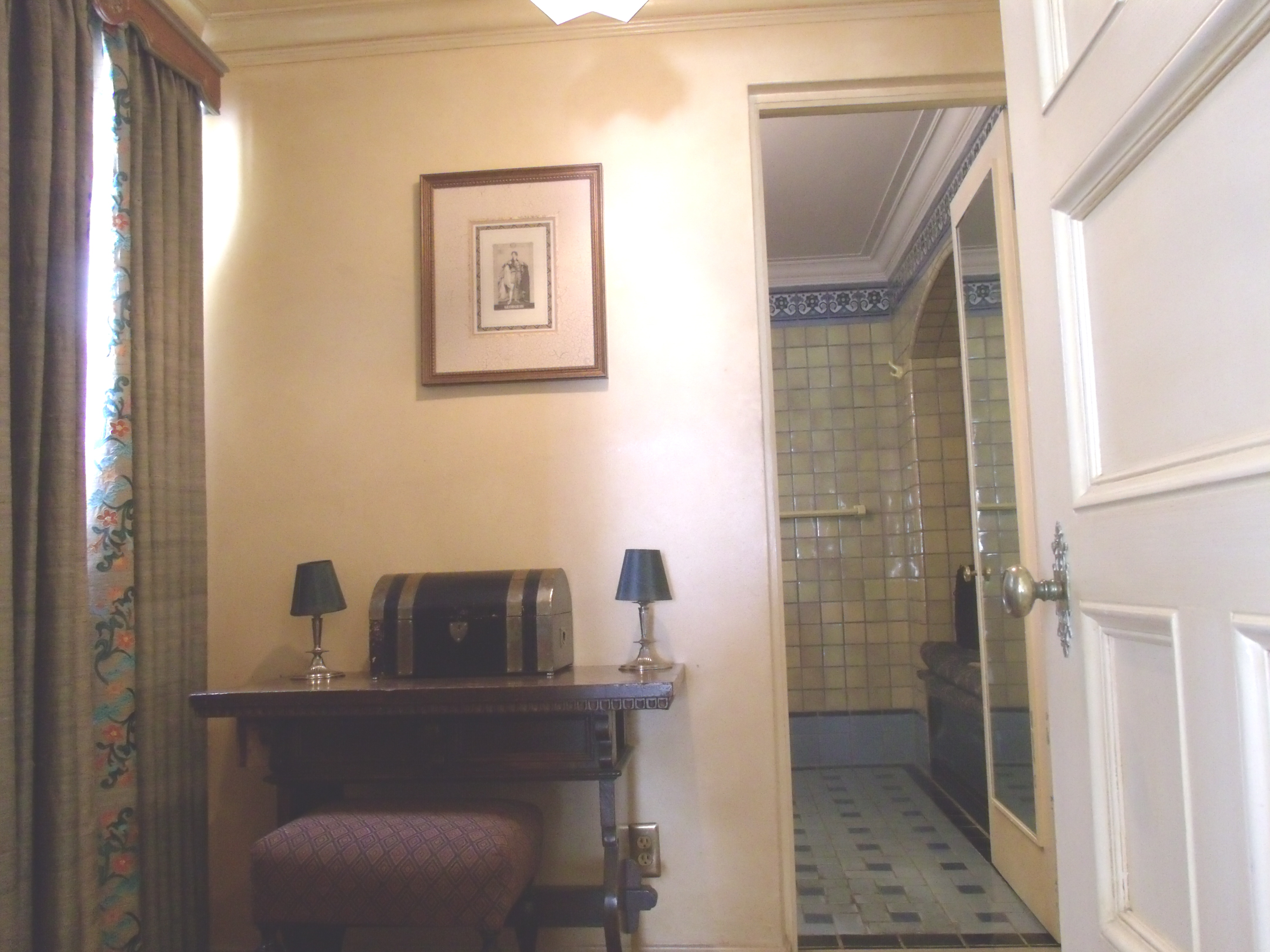
Bathroom adjacent to the room where, according to the owners, Elvis Presley stayed in the Wrigley Mansion.

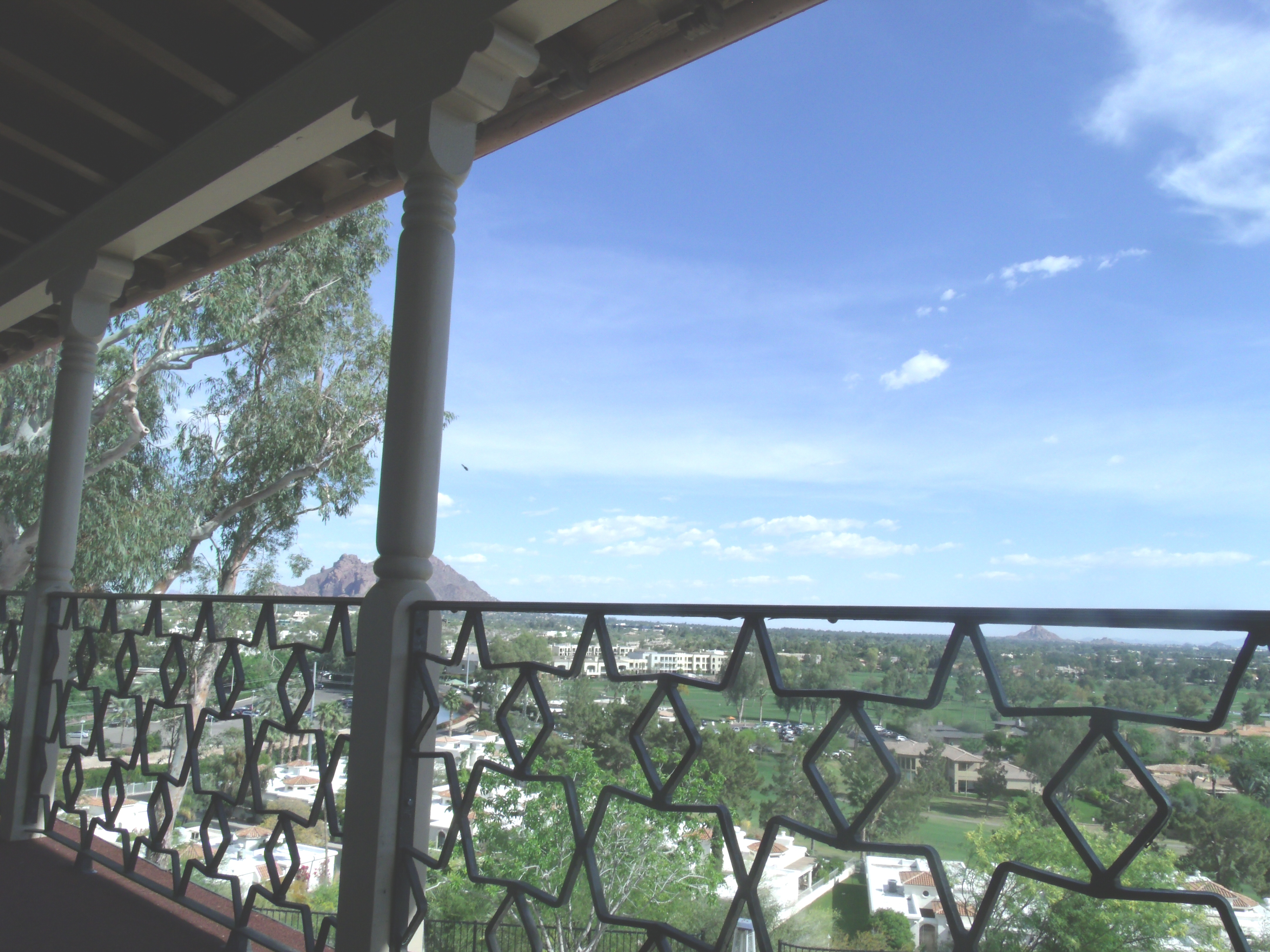
View from the second floor balcony of the Wrigley Mansion.

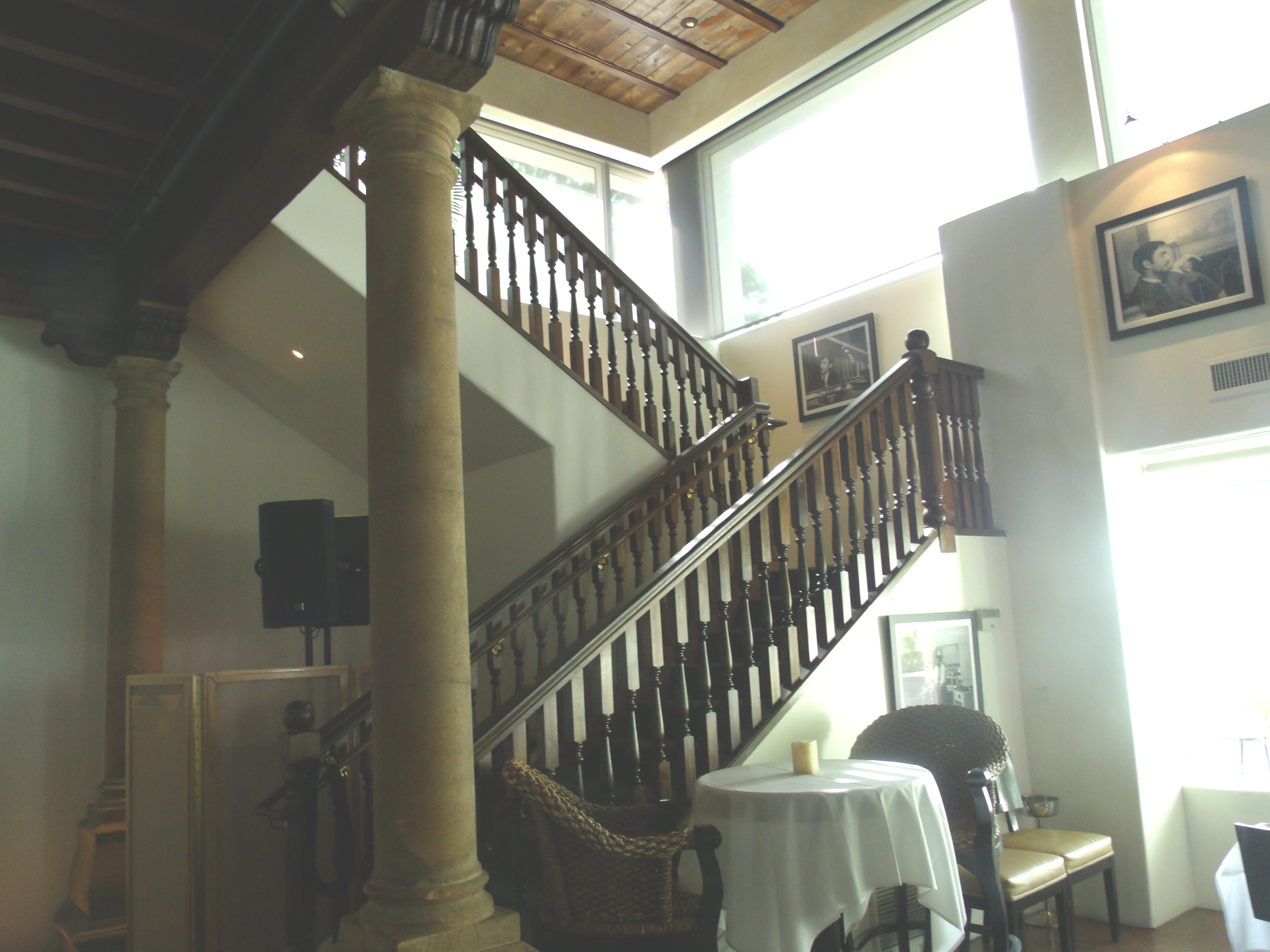
View of another staircase in the Wrigley Mansion.

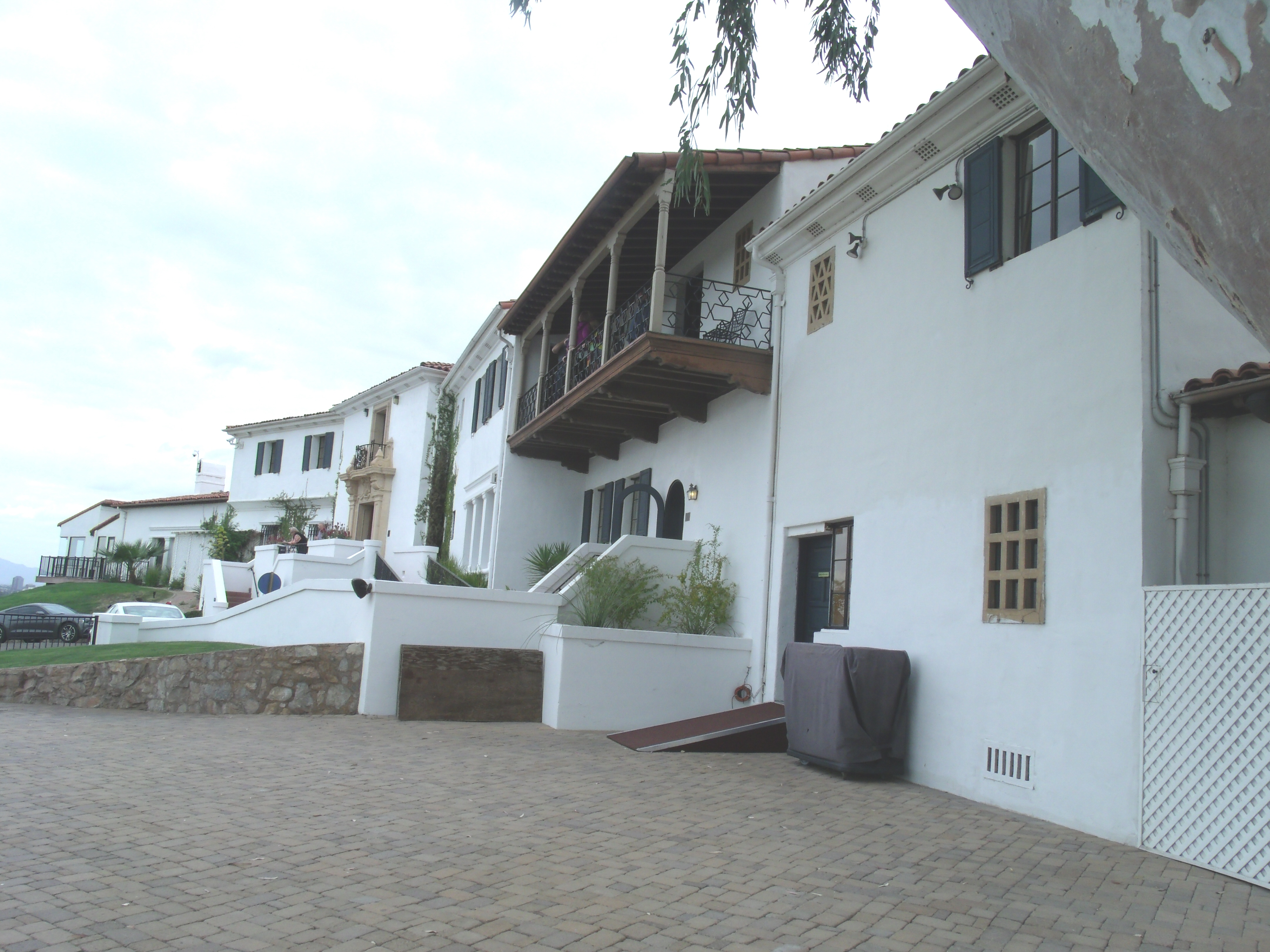
Different view of the Wrigley Mansion.

== Central Avenue Corridor ==
The north and south sides of the Central Avenue Corridor of Phoenix are lined with historical houses and buildings. These are the images of those properties. Some are listed in the National Register of Historic Places and some are listed in the Phoenix Historic Properties Register. There are also some historic properties which are listed in both registers.

Historic properties in Central Avenue Corridor
Listed in the Phoenix Historic Property Register-July 2004

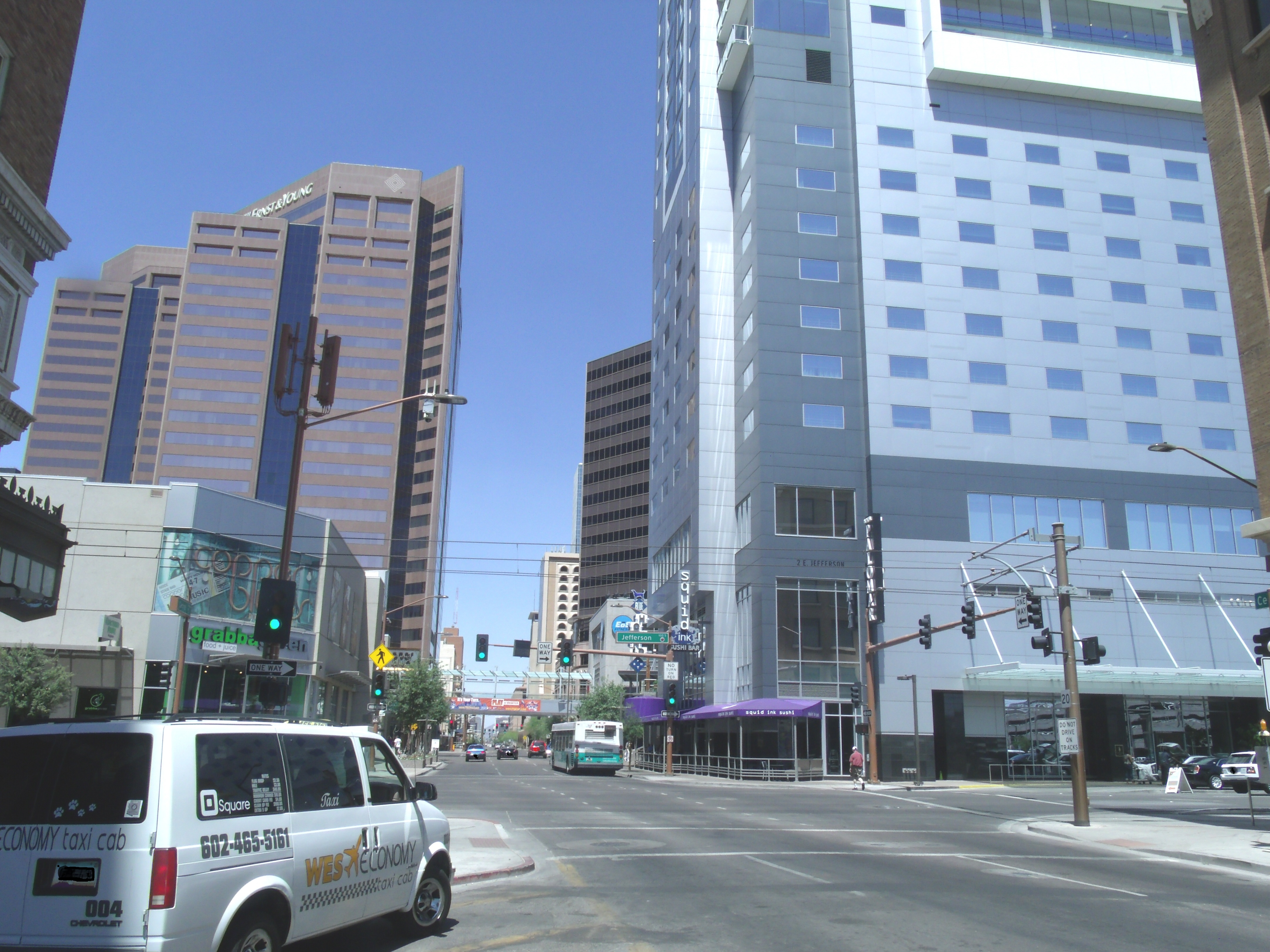
Downtown Central Avenue

(NRHP = National Register of Historic Places)
(PHPR = Phoenix Historic Property Register)
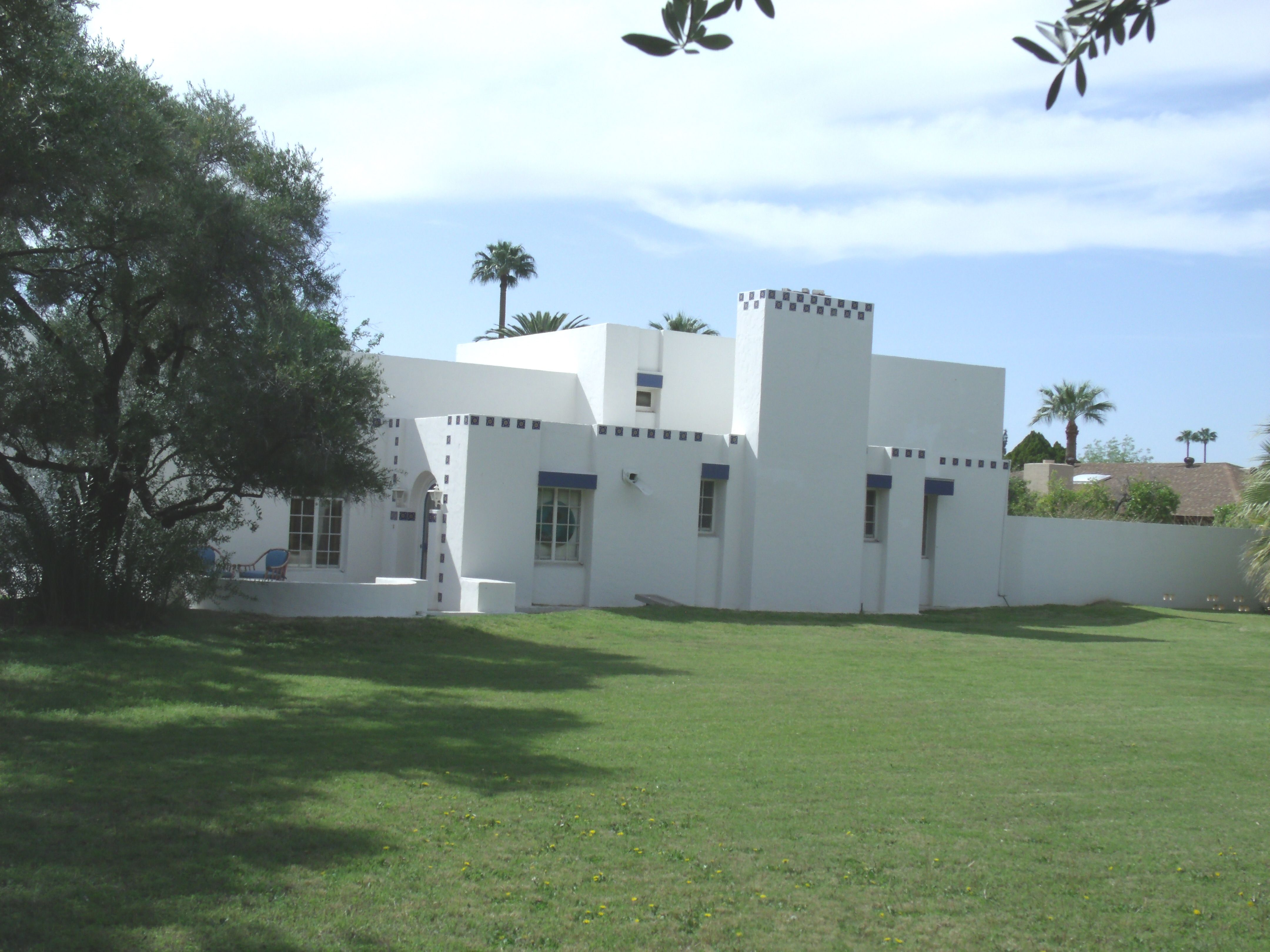
The David Morgan-Earl A. Bronson House was built in 1927 and is located at 8030 N. Central Avenue. It was listed in the National Register of Historic Places.

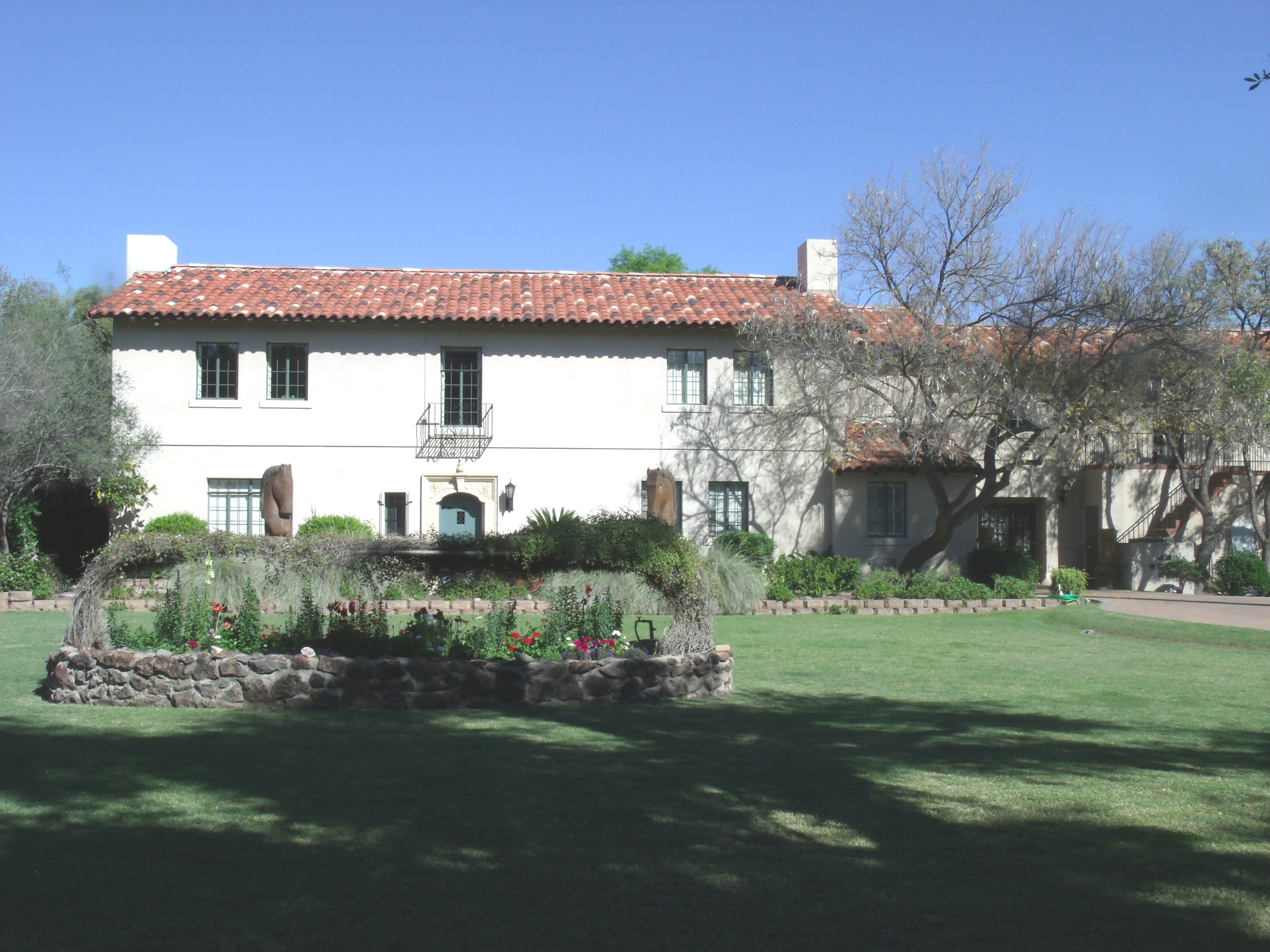
The Asbury-Salmon House was built in 1934 and is located at 7801 N. Central Avenue. This house was built by Cline Asbury who managed the Crystal Ice and Cold Storage in Phoenix, founded by his brother Harry. Cline died in 1942 and in 1945 his wife Delia sold the house to Riney Salmon. The Salmon family lived in the house until 1970, when Mr. Salmon died of injuries received in an auto accident. At the time of his death, his firm was said to be the largest law firm in the state. The house was listed in the Phoenix Historic Properties Register in March 2003. It was listed in the National Register of Historic Places on April 8, 2010.

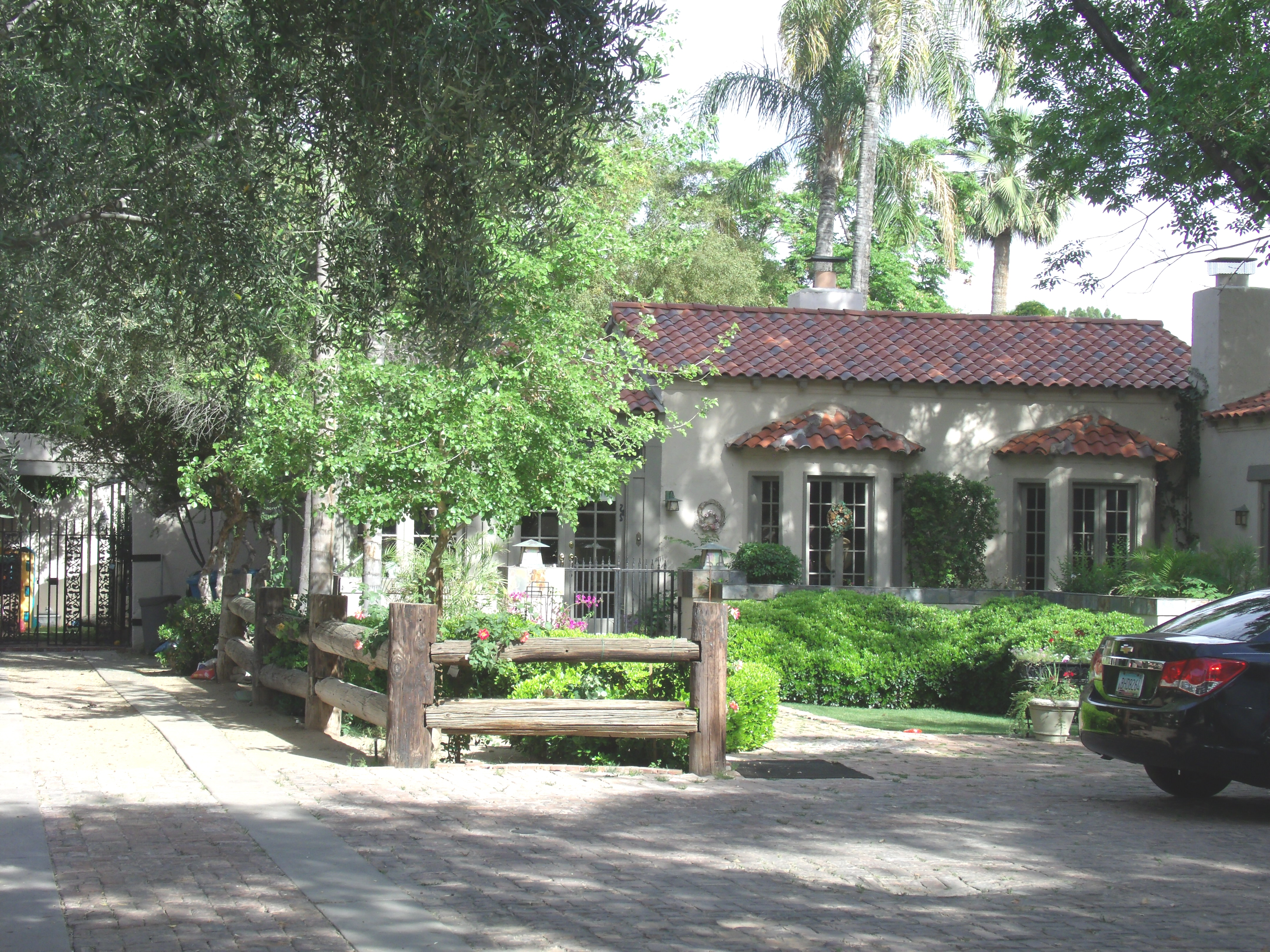
The Dr. Jean S. Holloway House was built in 1928 and is located 7215 N. Central Avenue. It was listed in the Phoenix Historic Properties Register in November 2005.

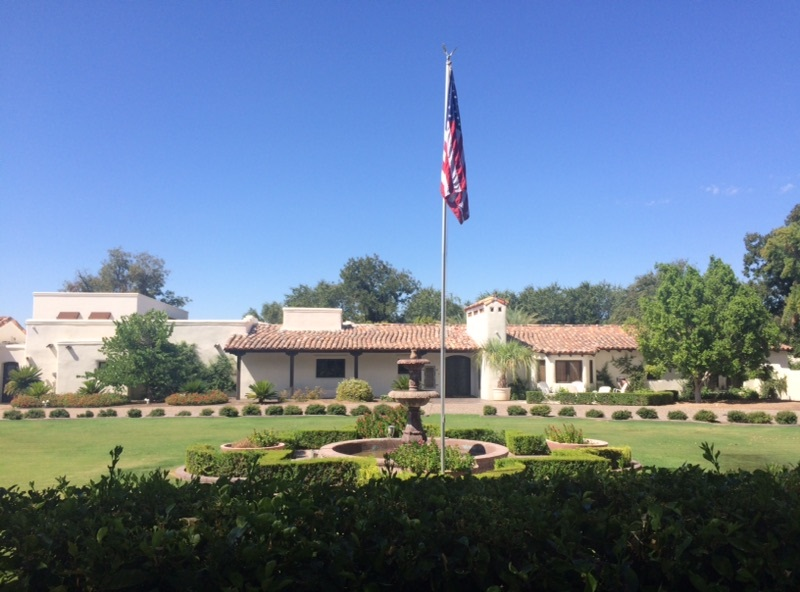
The John and Cindy McCain House built in 1951 and located at 7110 N. Central Avenue.

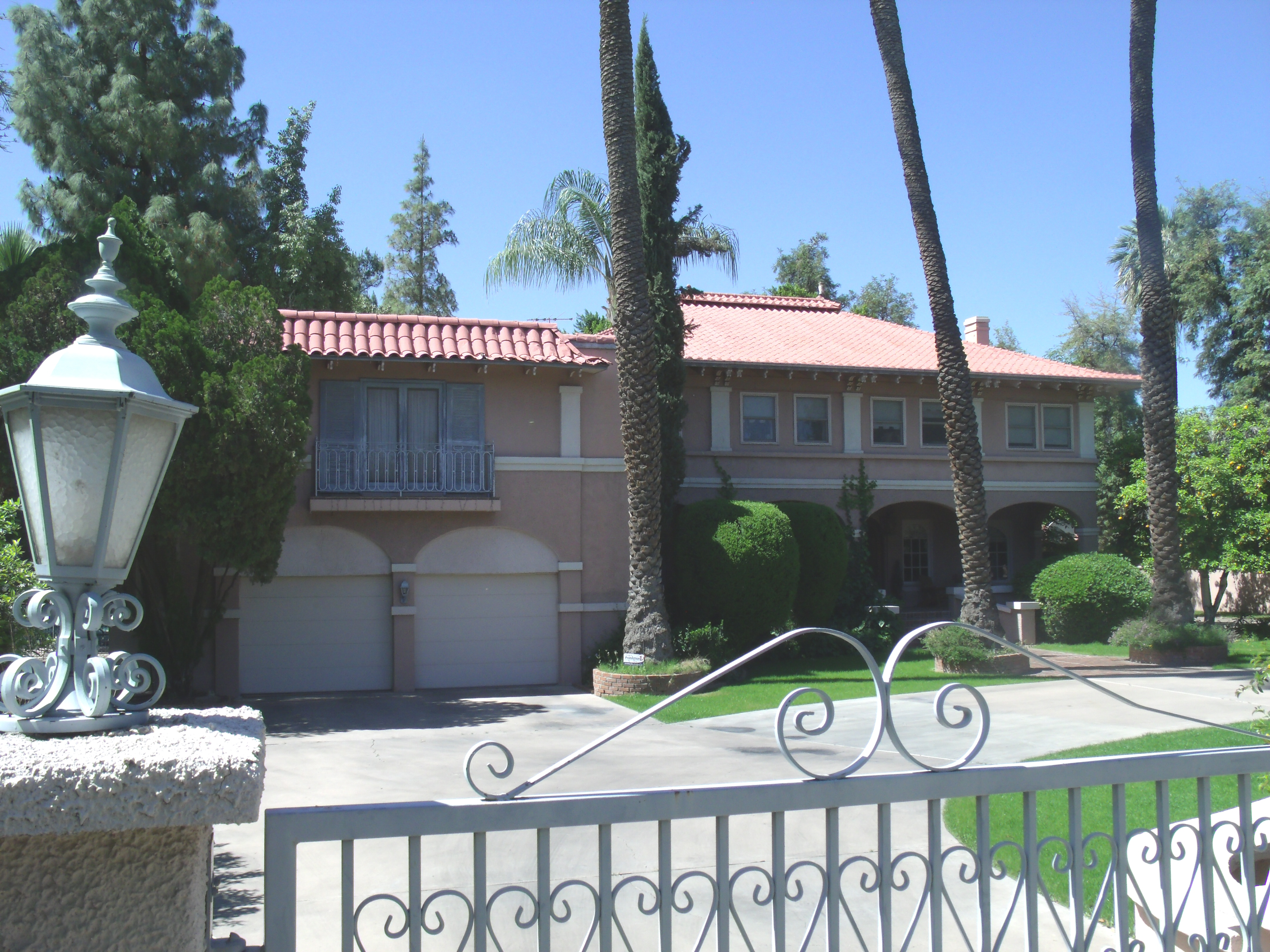
The George M. Halm and Mary Alverda Howard House was built in 1906 and is located at 6850 N. Central Avenue. It was listed in the Phoenix Historic Properties Register in November 2005 and in the National Register of Historic Places on January 24, 2011, reference #10001161.

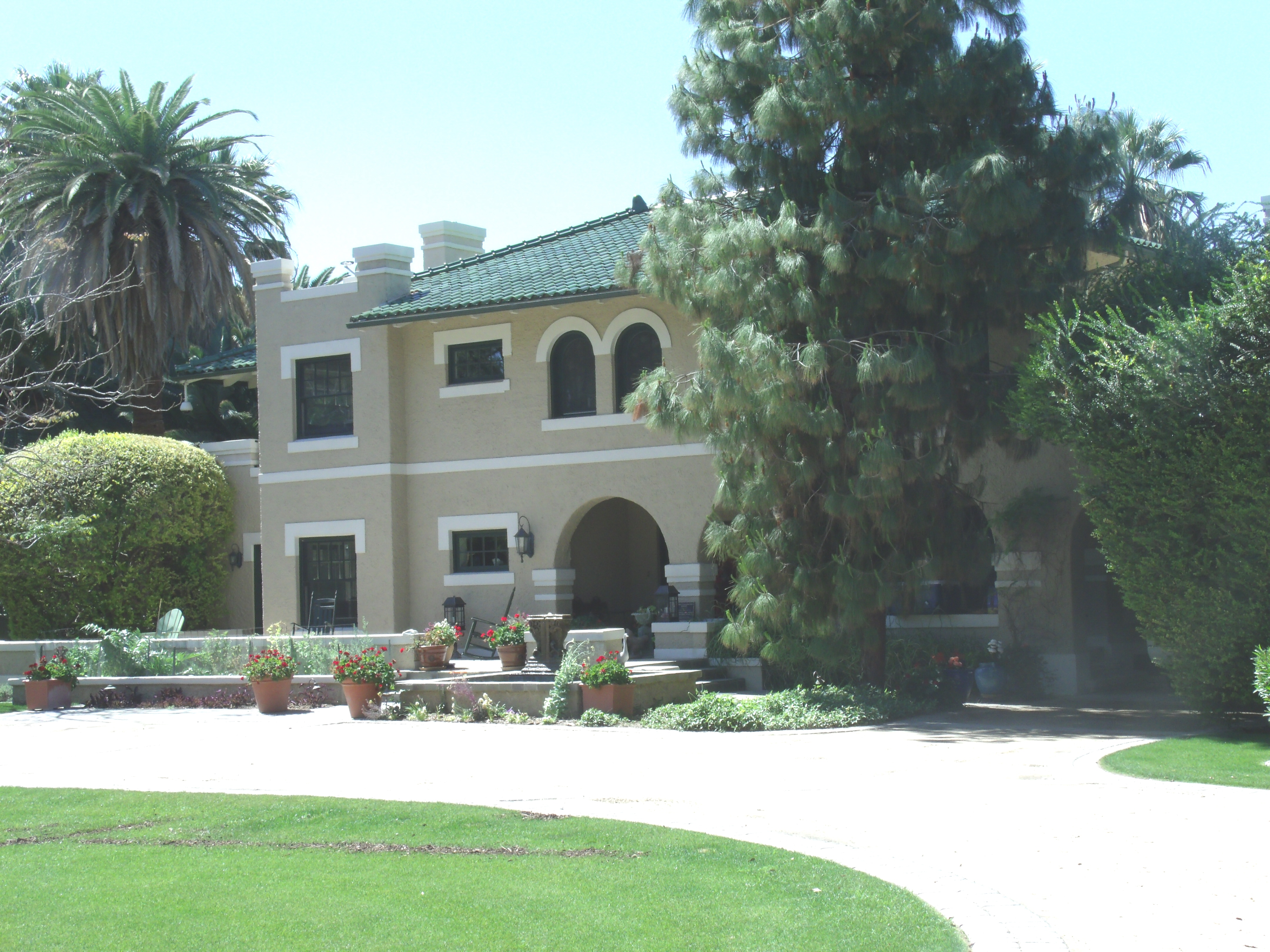
The Olney-Ellinwood House was built in 1912 and is located at 6810 N. Central Avenue. It was listed in the Phoenix Historic Properties Register in March 2003. It was listed in the National Register of Historic Places on April 8, 2010. reference #10000155.

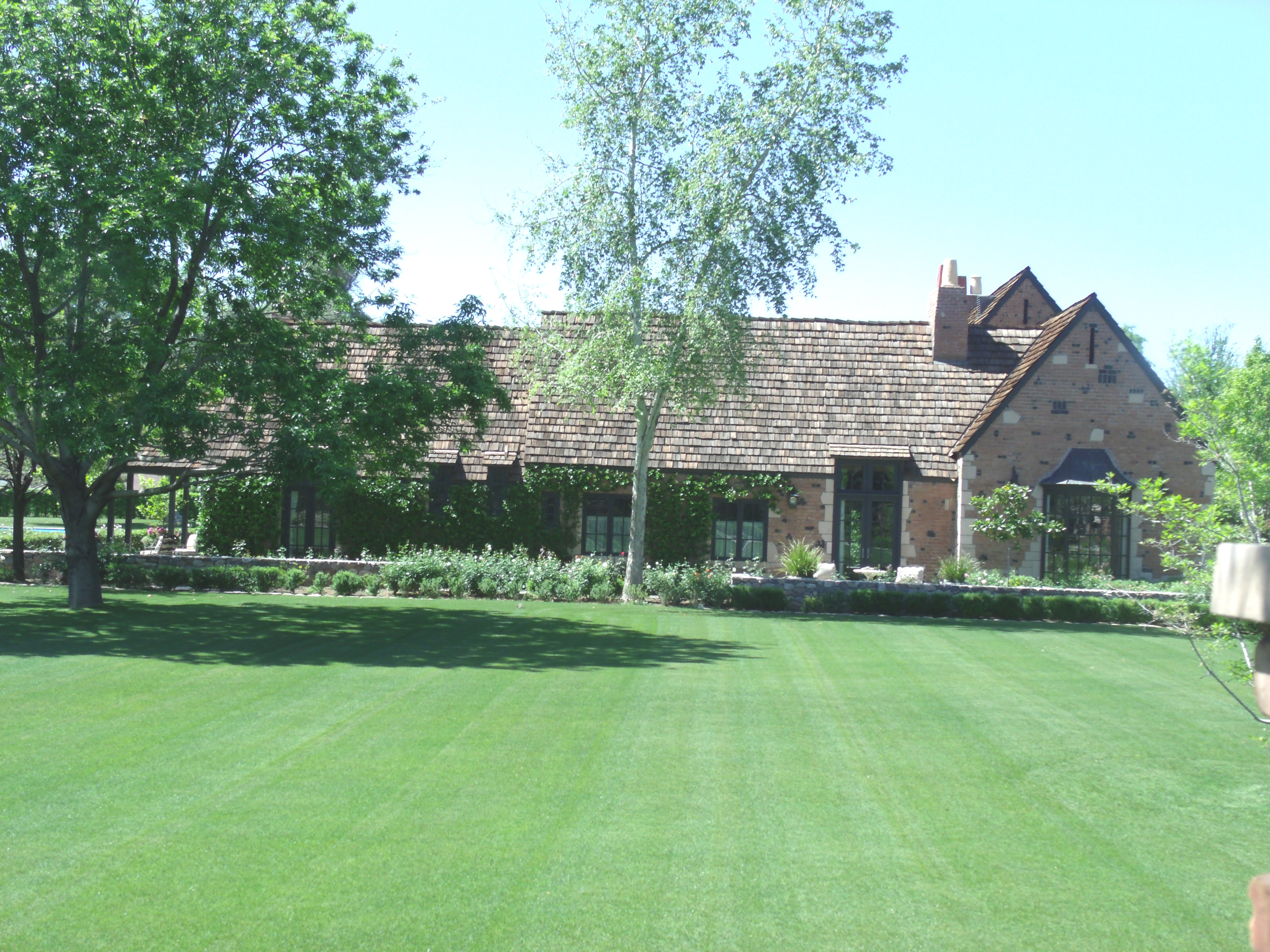
The John M. Ross House was built in 1926 and is located at 6722 N. Central Avenue. John Mason Ross was a partner with the successful and well-known law firm of Ellinwood and Ross. The firm represented large clients such as the Phelps-Dodge (mining) Corporation. In addition, Ross also participated in many Arizona civic and political affairs. It was listed in the National Register of Historic Places on February 24, 2000, reference #00000145.

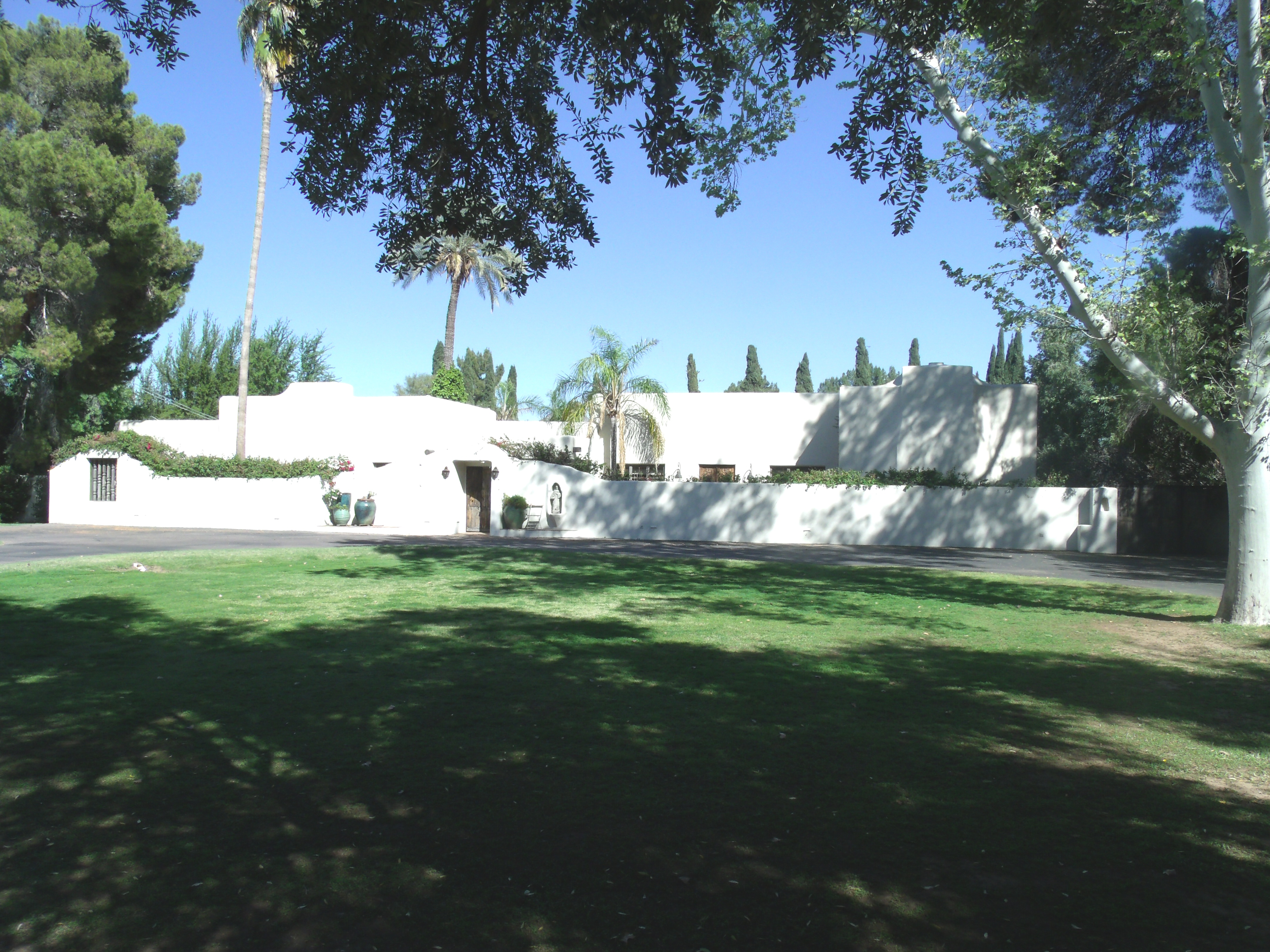
The Ralph Converse House was built in 1935 and is located at 6617 N. Central Avenue. It was listed in the Phoenix Historic Properties Register in March 2003. It was listed in the National Register of Historic Places on April 8, 2010, reference #10000153.

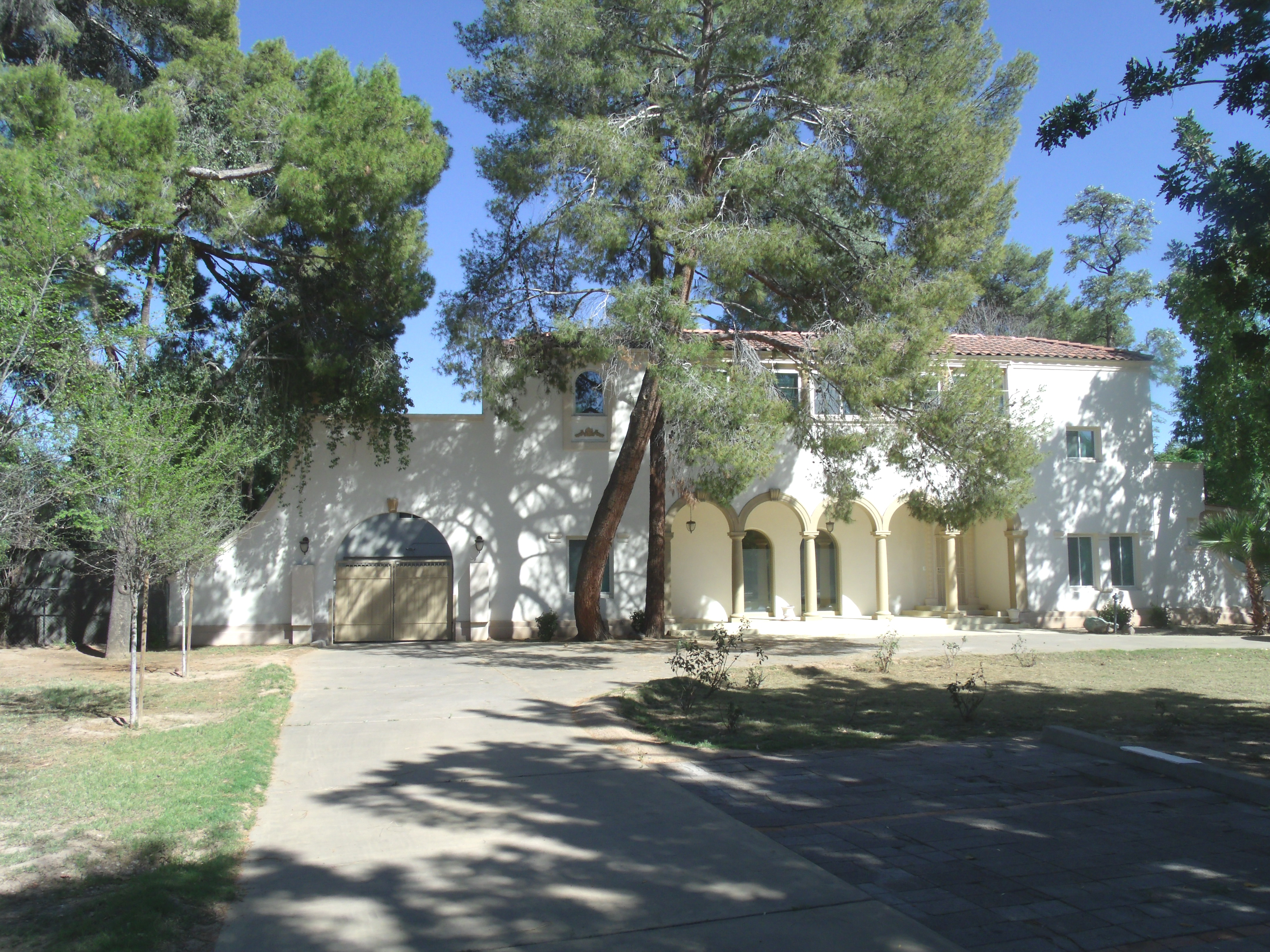
The Mrs. Leonard George House was built in 1929 and is located at 6611 N. Central Avenue. It was listed in the Phoenix Historic Properties Register in March 2003.

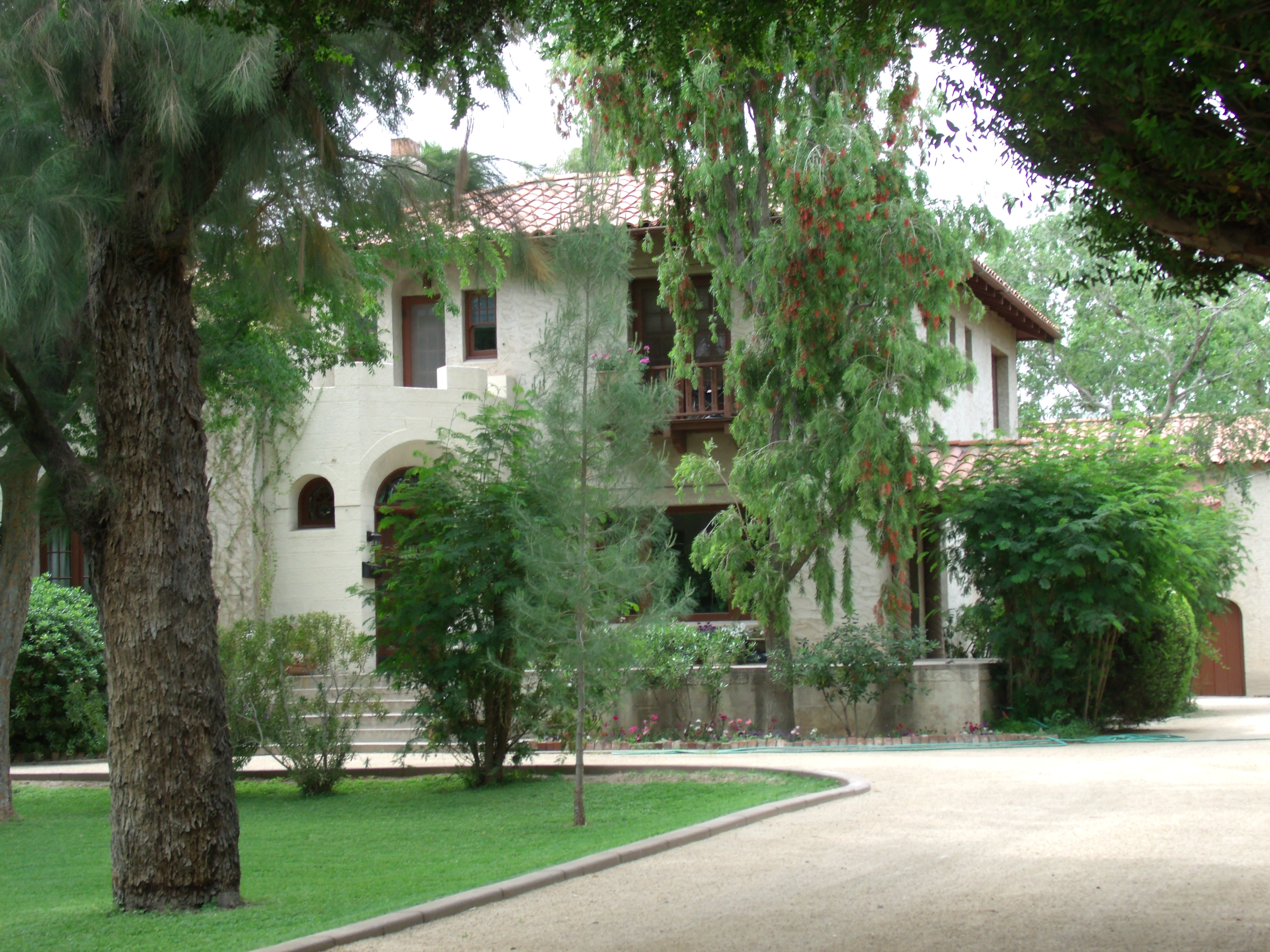
The Abner Elliot England-Guy Hidden Lawrence House was built in 1929 and is located at 6234 N. Central Avenue. It was listed in the National Register of Historic Places.

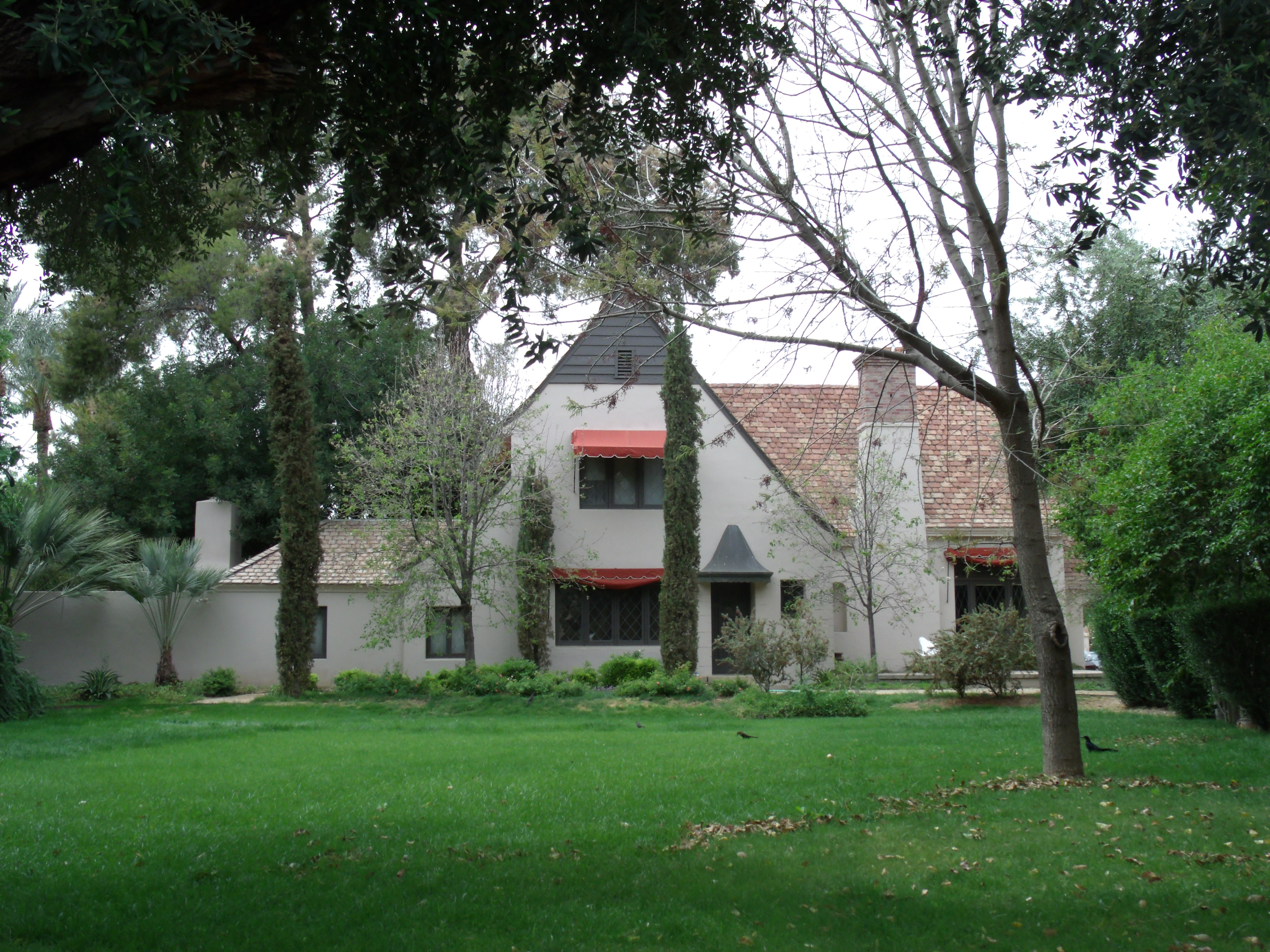
The Judge Fred C. Jacobs House was built in 1928 and is located at 6224 N. Central Avenue. It was listed in the National Register of Historic Places.

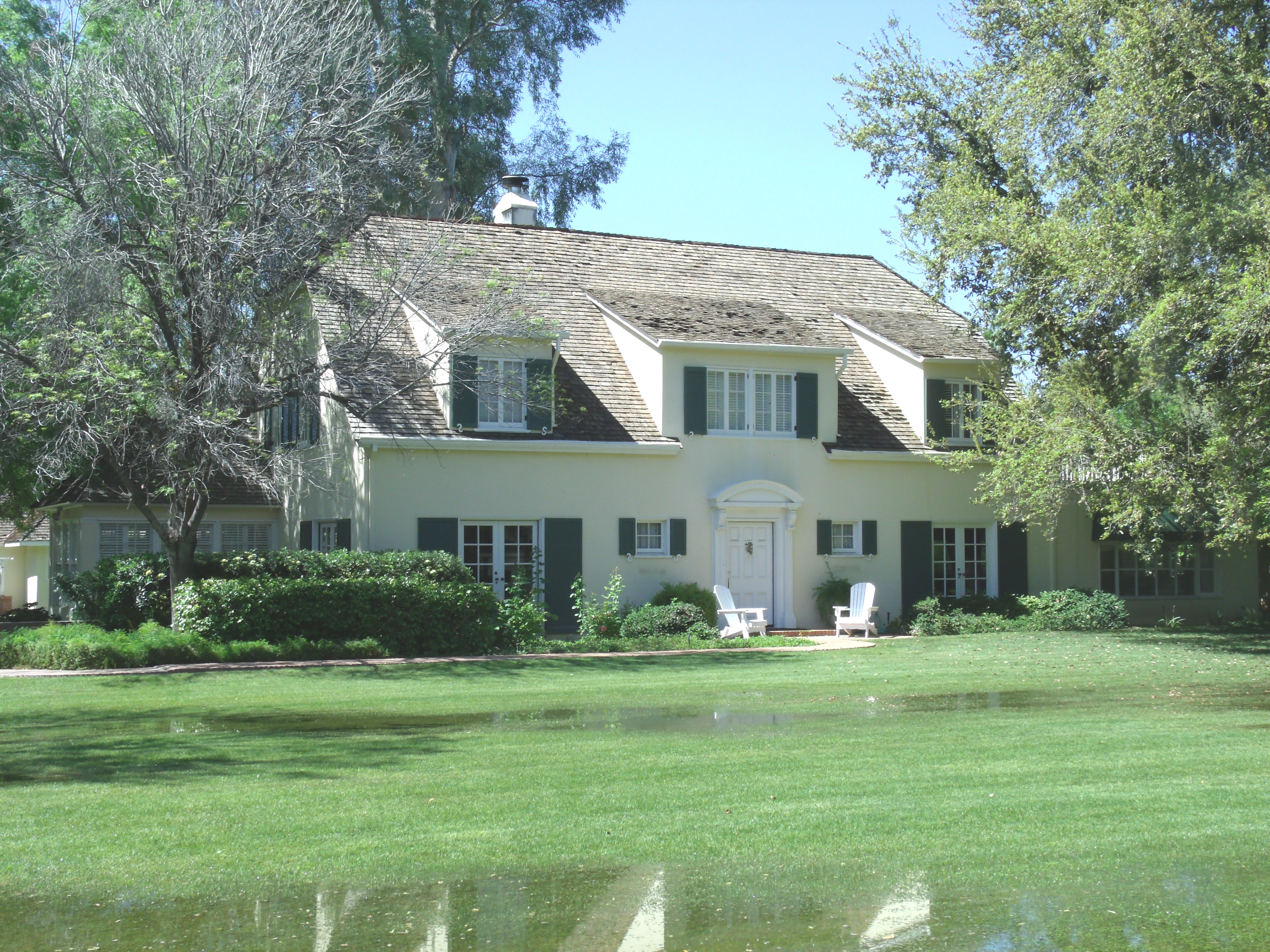
The E. Payne Palmer House was built in 1929 and is located at 6012 N. Central Avenue. Dr. Errol Payne Palmer was a significant member of the medical community at local, national and international levels. He made tremendous contributions to advance hospital standardization and administration in the United States. Additionally, his contributions in surgical techniques, cancer research and patient care coincide with the advancements in medicine in the early 20th century. Dr. Palmer was also a prominent member and contributor to his community giving selflessly of his time and money to religious, arts and social organizations in order to improve the quality of life for others in Phoenix. It was listed in the Phoenix Historic Properties Register in June 1999. It was listed in the National Register of Historic Places on May 2, 2002, reference #02000420.

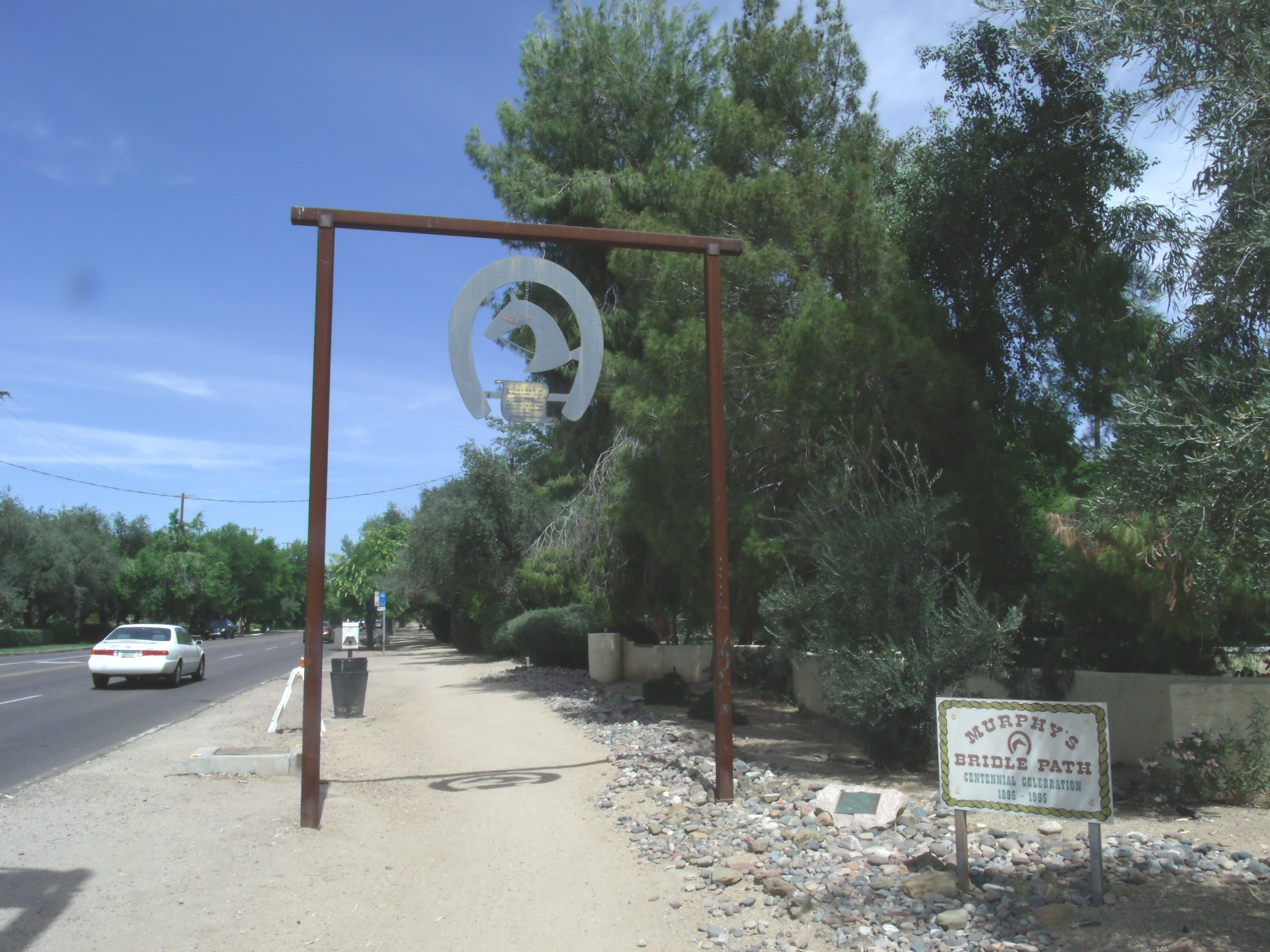
The Murphy Bridle Path begins at Bethany Homes Road and ends two and half miles north at the Arizona Canal. This particular landscape or streetscape history is significant in telling the story of how Phoenix developed in the late 1880s and the early years of the 20th century. William John Murphy, who moved from Illinois to Phoenix in 1883, built the Arizona Canal and established the Valley citrus industry in the northern extension of Central Avenue in 1895. The roadway cut through the Orangewood subdivision he developed and was first paved in 1920. The earliest reference to the Murphy Bridle Path that the city's historic preservation office discovered was in 1948 when the bridle path was dedicated by the "Arizona Horse Lover's Club." The North Central Avenue streetscape is now on the Phoenix Historic Property Register and has been nominated to the National Register of Historic Places.

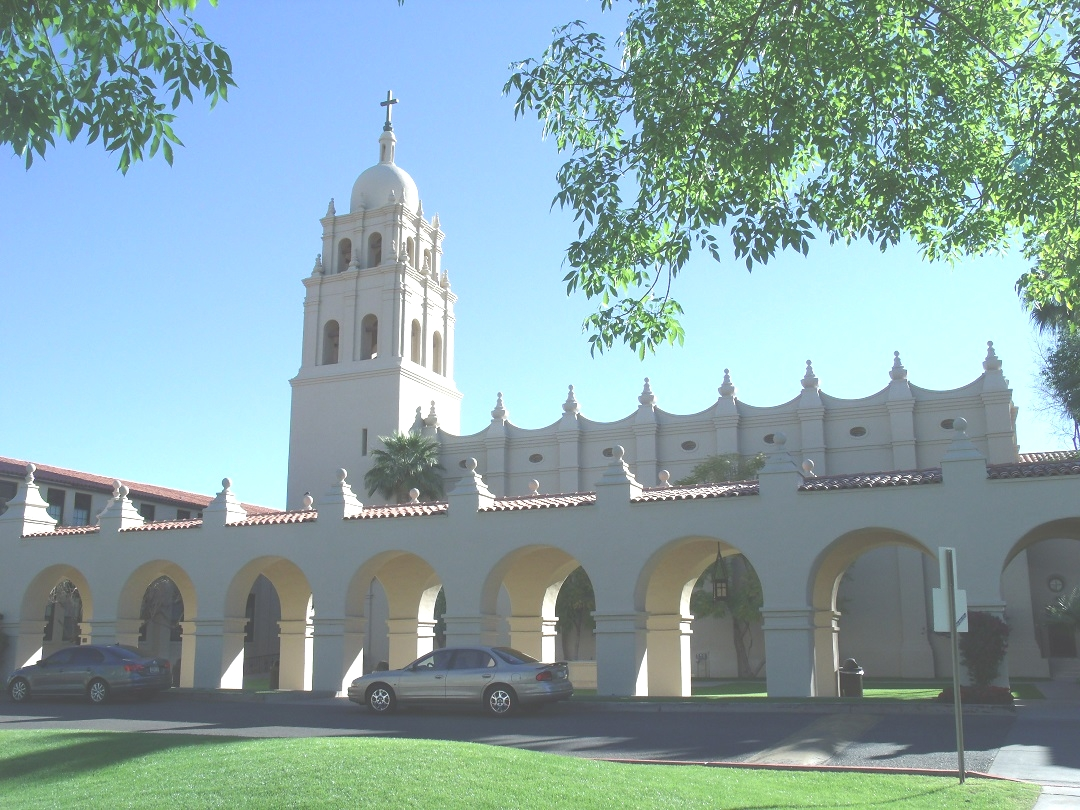
The Brophy College Chapel was built in 1928 and is located at 4701 N. Central Avenue. The Chapel was donated by Mrs. William Henry Brophy in memory of her husband. The Spanish Colonial chapel was built by the students of Brophy College. It was listed in the National Register of Historic Places on August 10, 1993, reference #93000747.

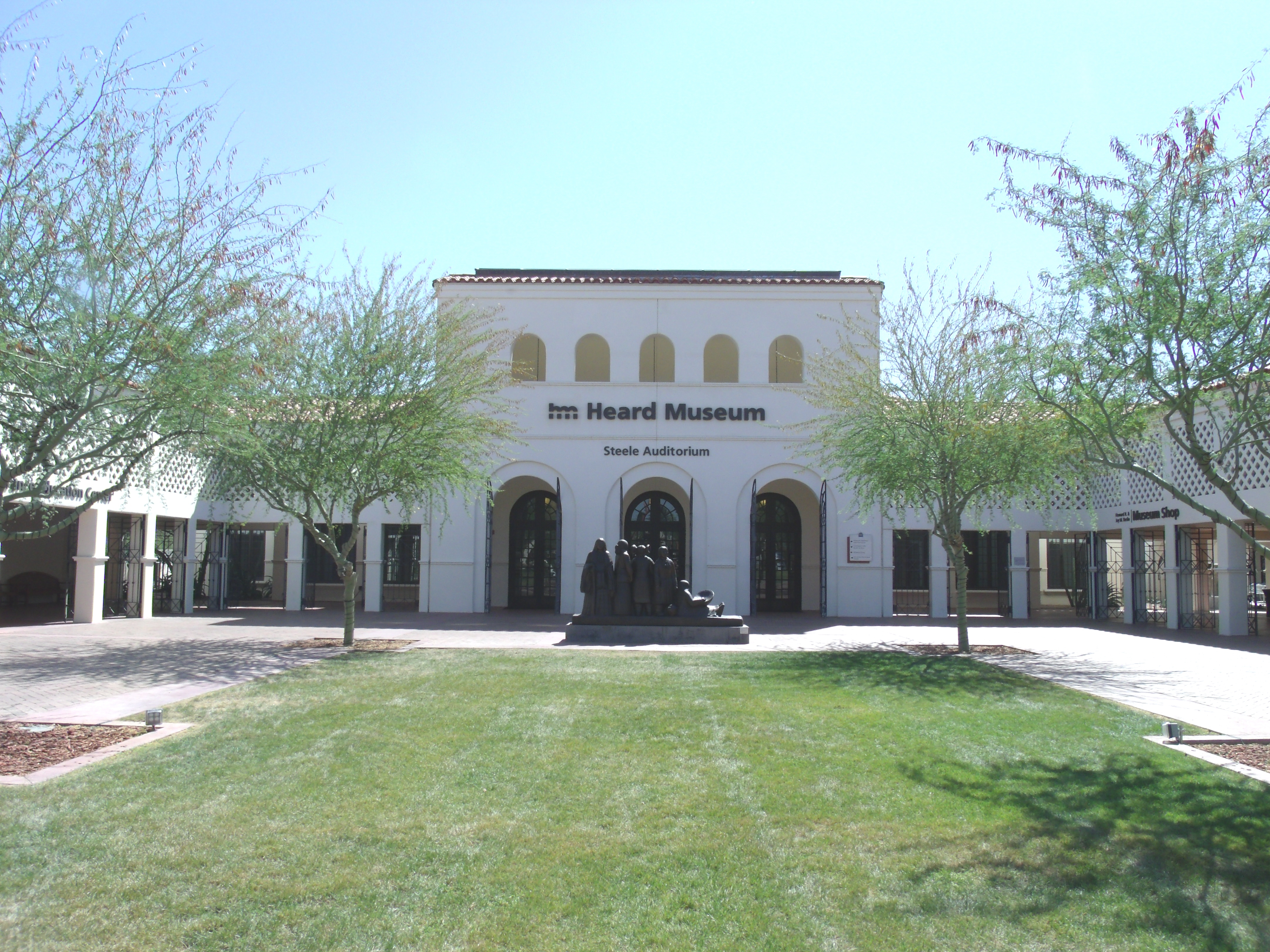
The front entrance of the Heard Museum building, which was built in 1929 and is located at 2301 N. Central Avenue. / 22 E. Monte Vista Road. It was listed in the Phoenix Historic Property Register in August 1992.

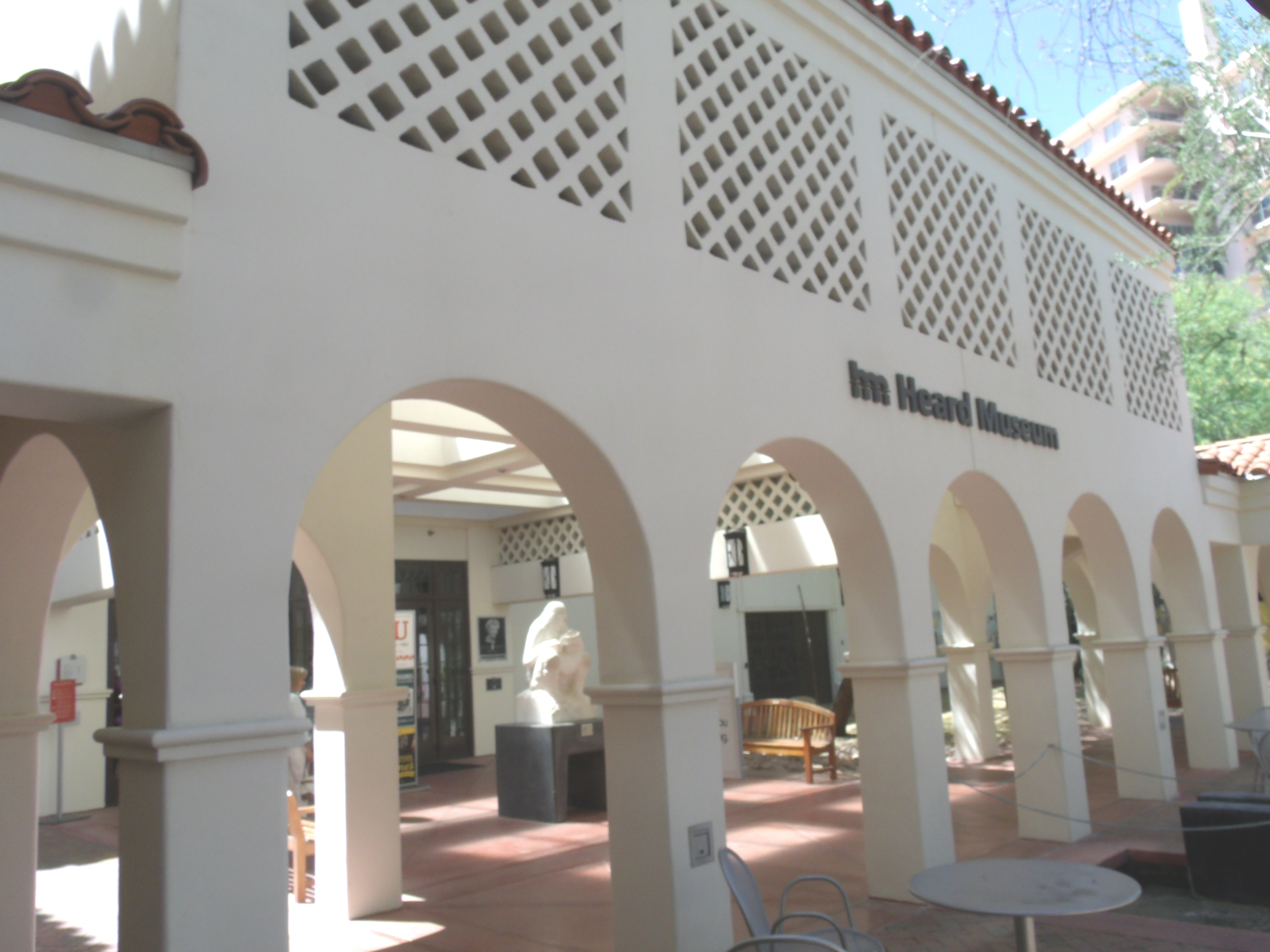
The Heard Museum building was built in 1929 and is located at 2301 N. Central Avenue. / 22 E. Monte Vista Road. Maie Heard added quality artworks to the collection and worked closely with the board of trustees to direct the activities of the museum. She also oversaw the programming activities of the museum, approving speakers and insuring appropriate publicity was available. It was listed in the Phoenix Historic Property Register in August 1992.

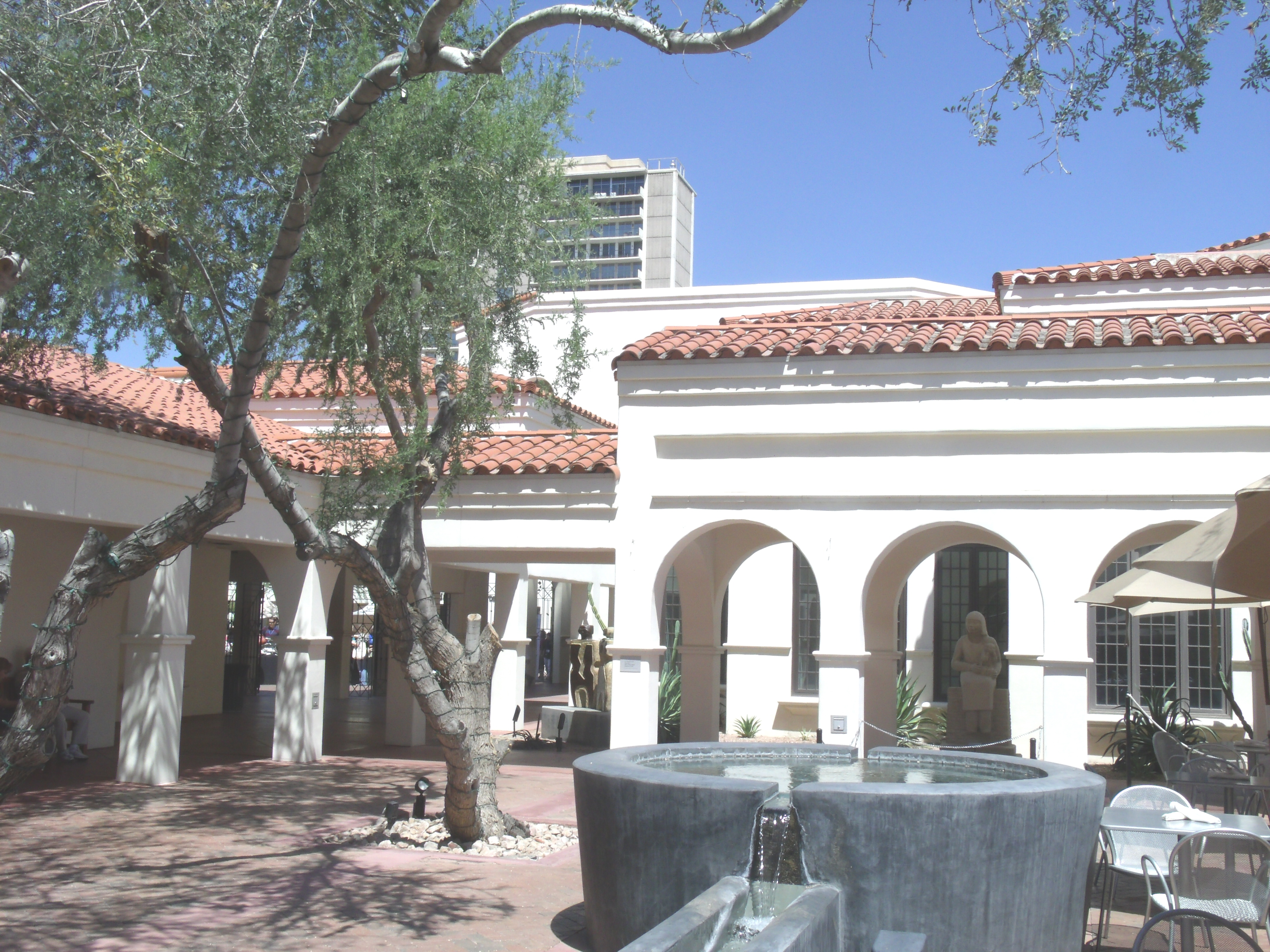
Different view of the Heard Museum

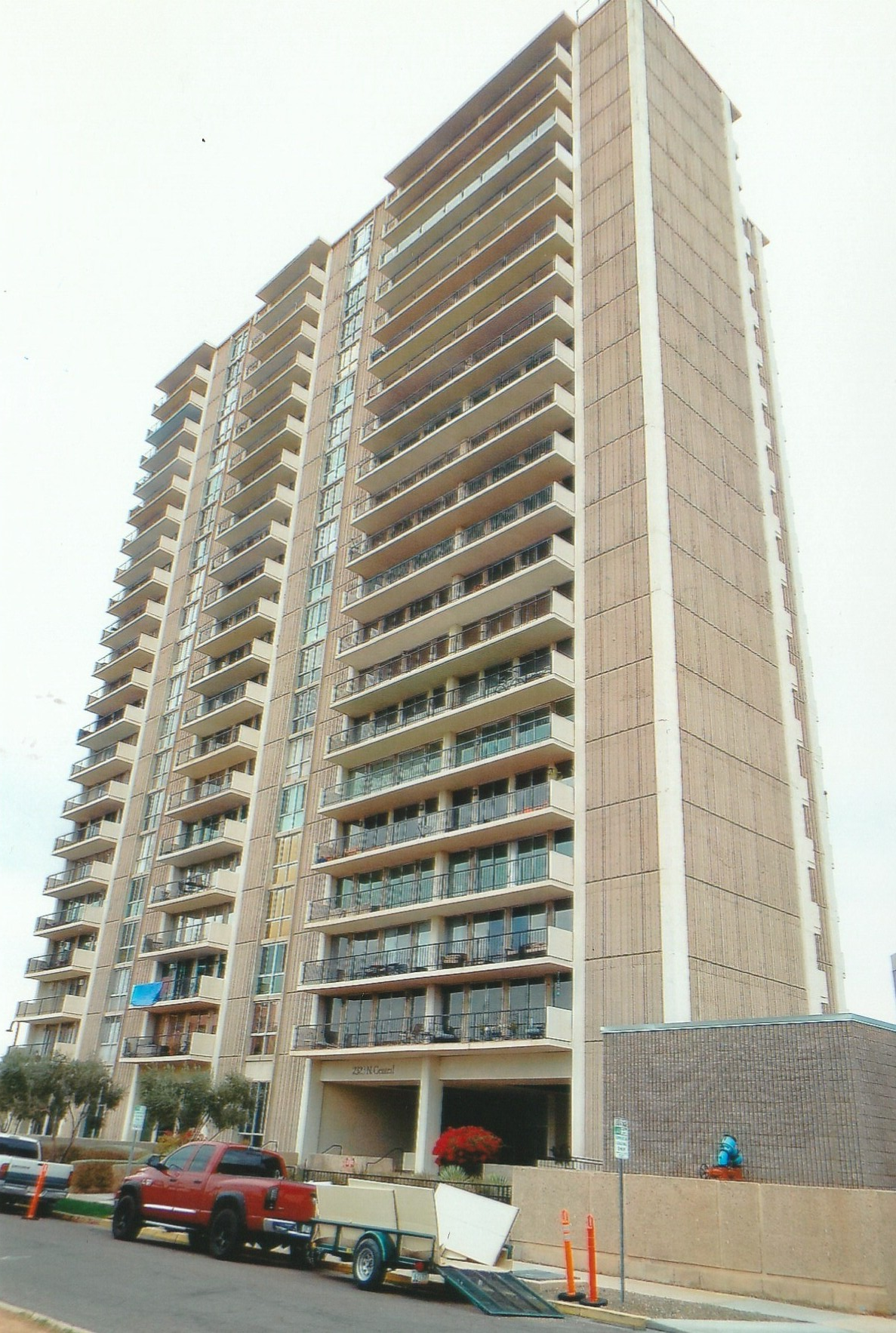
The Regency House was built in 1964 and is located at 2323 North Central Avenue. It was listed in the National Register of Historic Places on September 26, 2016, reference # 16000630.

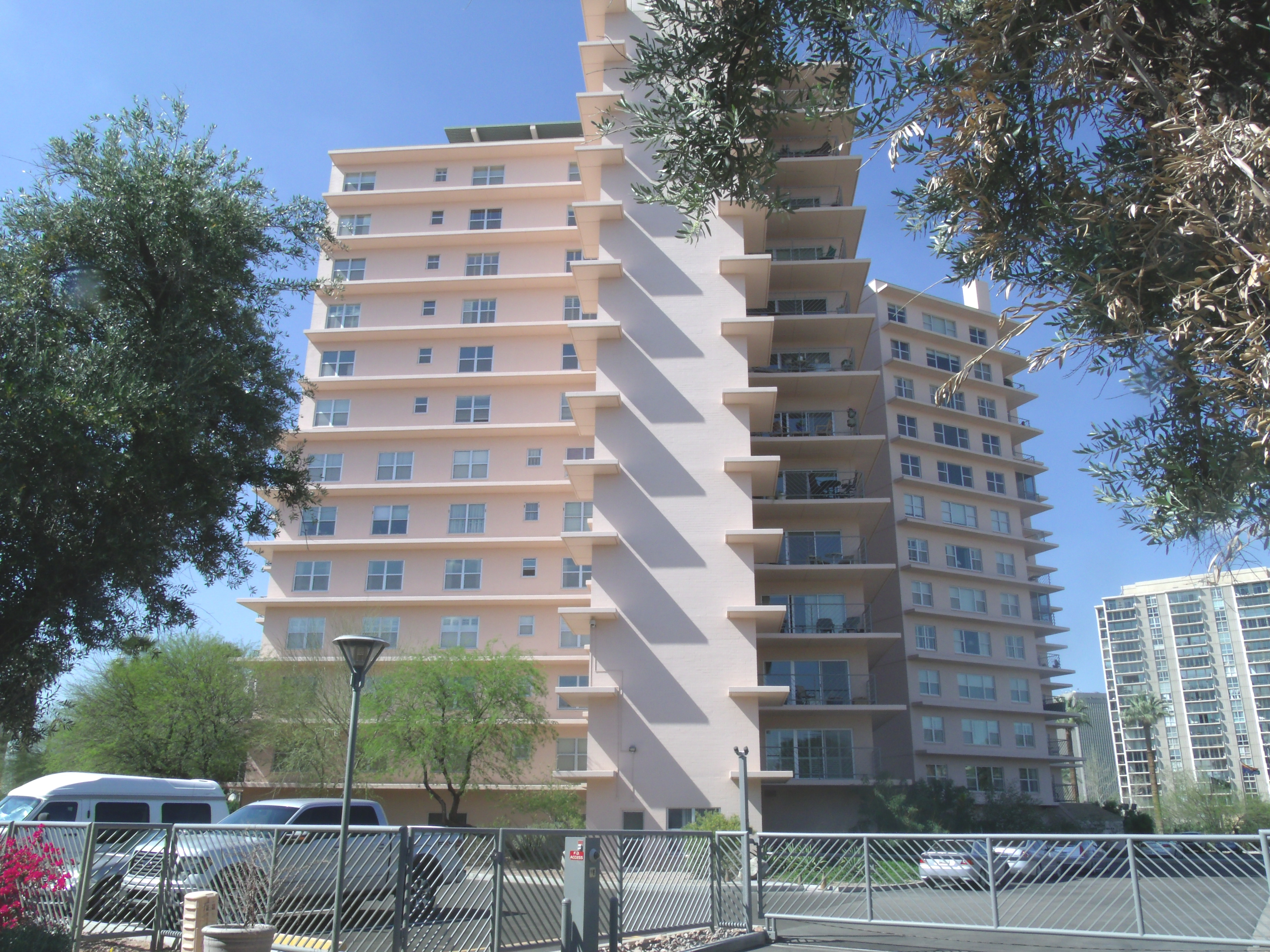
The Phoenix Towers were built in 1957 and are located at 2201 N. Central Avenue. Phoenix Towers was built as a resident-owned cooperative community, Phoenix Towers is now considered an outstanding example of mid-century architecture and was listed in the National Register of Historic Places on January 2, 2008, reference #07001334.

Front view of the Phoenix Towers. The towers were built in 1957 and are located at 2201 N. Central Avenue. Phoenix Towers was built as a resident-owned cooperative community, Phoenix Towers is now considered an outstanding example of mid-century architecture and was listed in the National Register of Historic Places on January 2, 2008, reference #07001334.

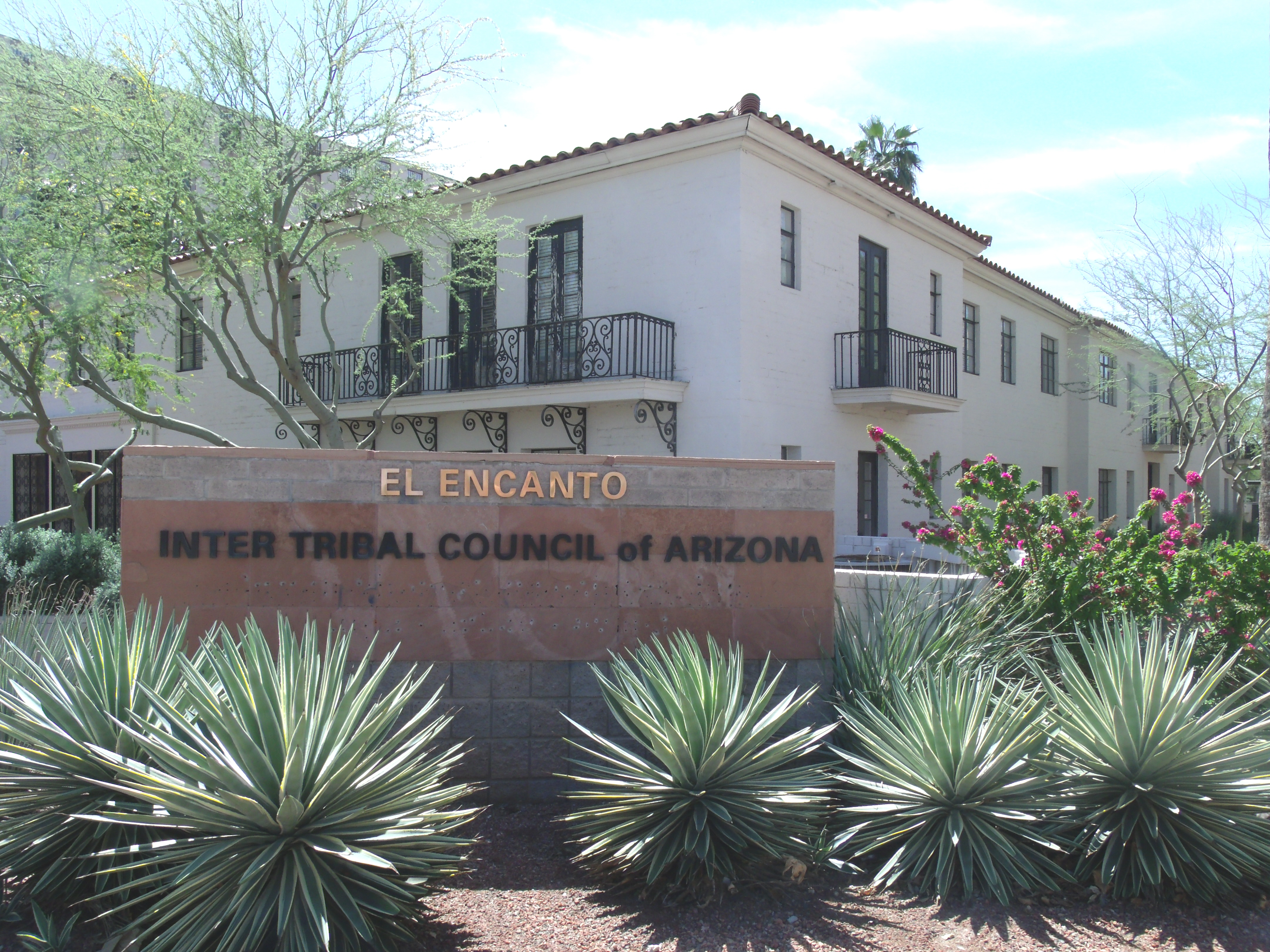
The El Encanto Apartment Building was built in 1939 and is located at 2214 N. Central Avenue. The El Encanto Apartment Building was the largest apartment complex in Phoenix at the time. The Inter Tribal Council of Arizona Inc. is oversaw the renovation of the complex. It was listed in the Phoenix Historic Properties Register in December 1990.

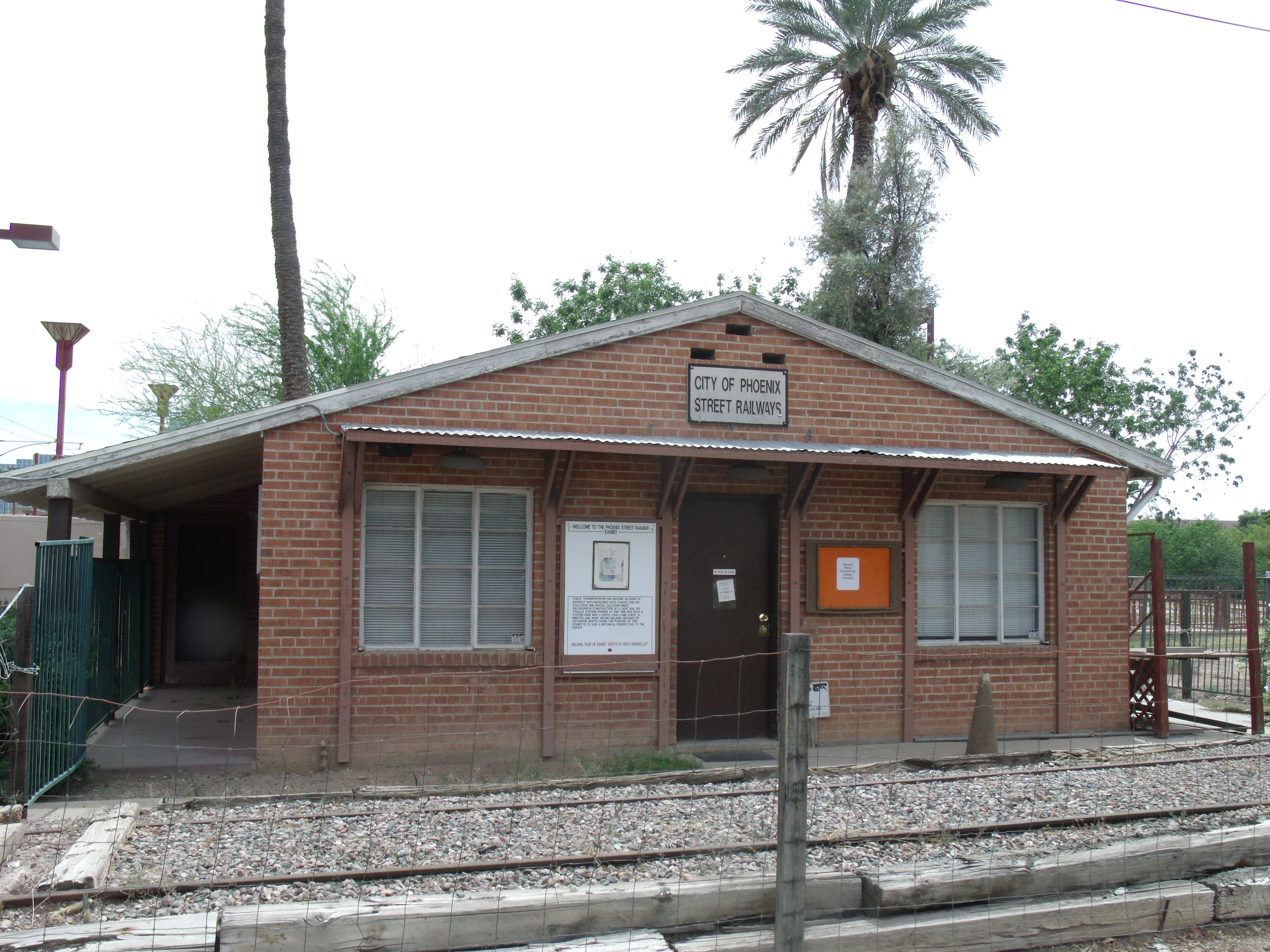
The Dr. Shackelford Dental Office Building which currently houses a small exhibit of the Arizona Street Railway Museum and is located at 1242 N. Central Avenue. It is listed in the Phoenix Historic Property Register.

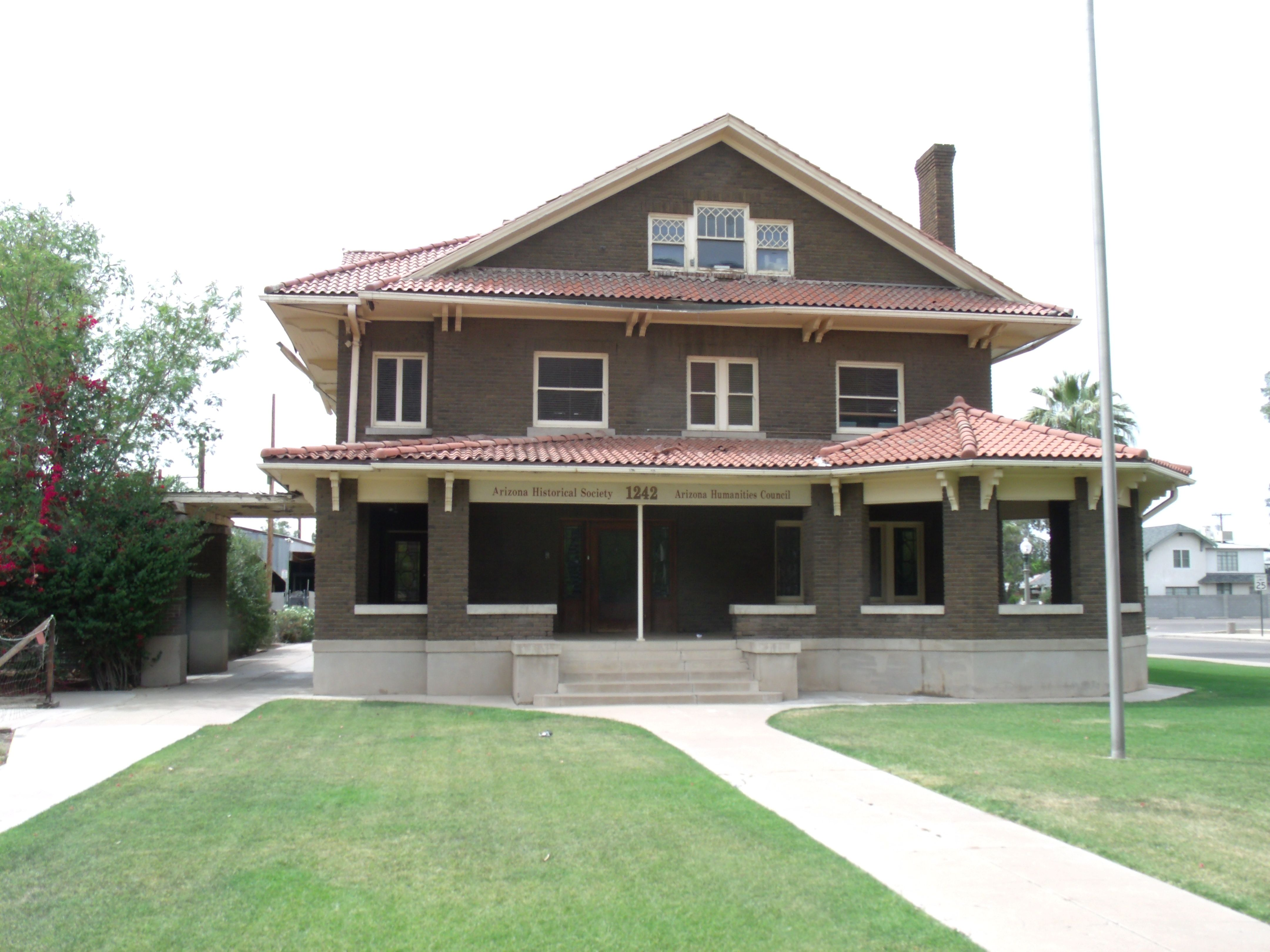
The Dr. Ellis-Shackelford House was built in 1917 and is located at 1242 N. Central Avenue. It was listed in the National Register of Historic Places.

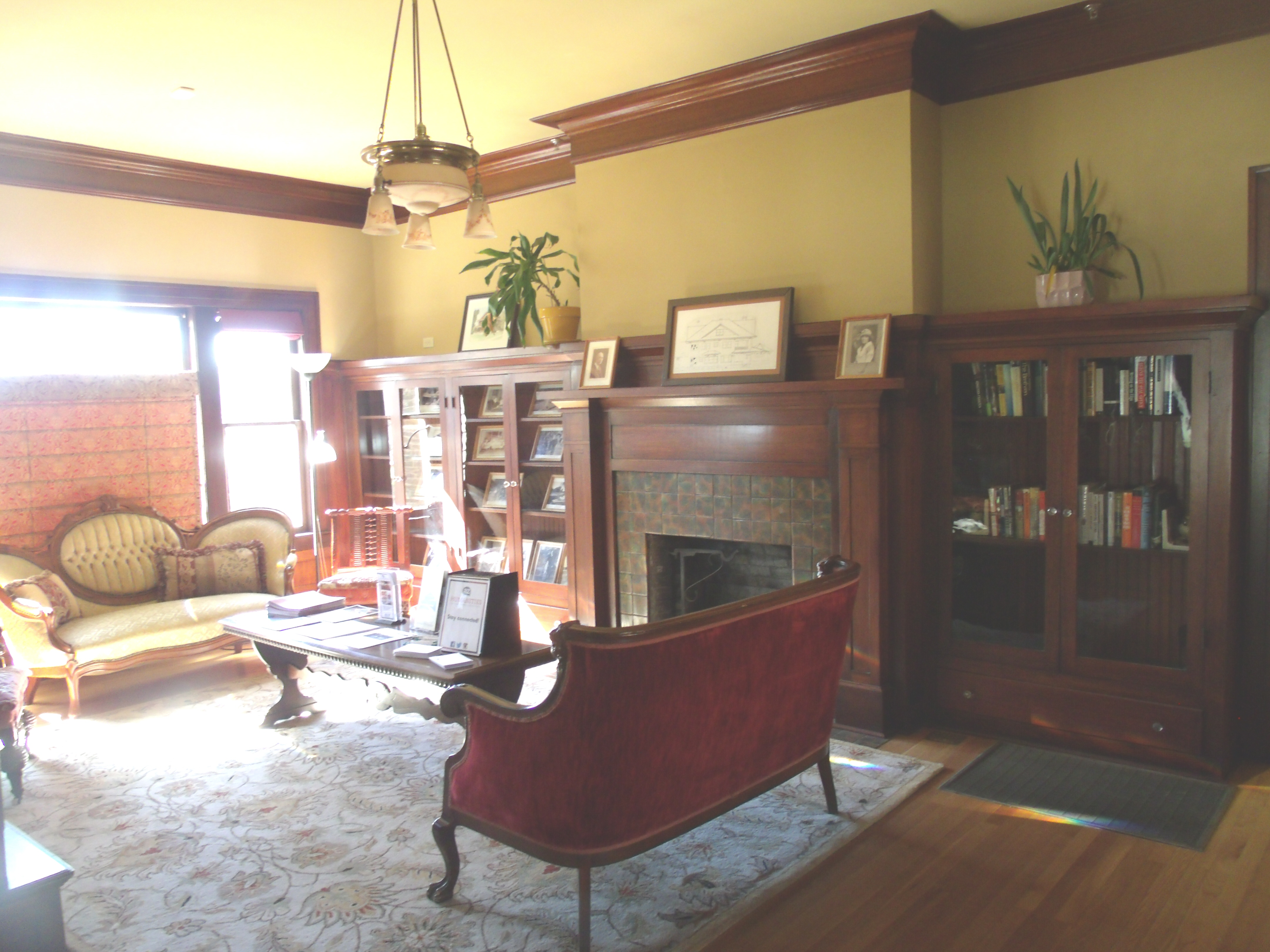
Living room of the Dr. Ellis-Shackelford House. The house was built in 1917 and is located in 1242 N. Central Avenue. On November 30, 1983, the house was listed in the National Register of Historic Places, ref.: #83003475.

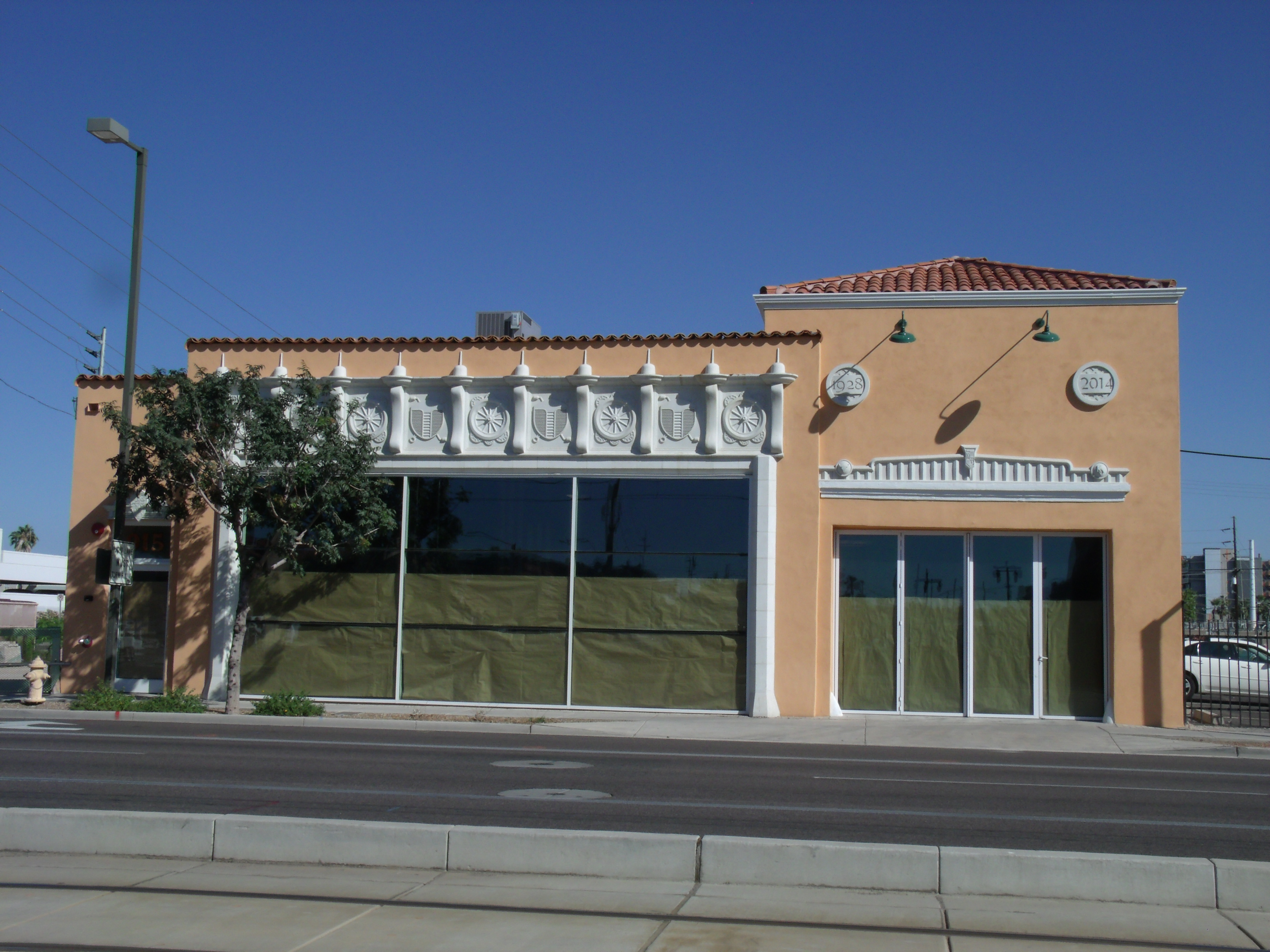
The C. P. Stephans De Soto Six Motor Cars building was built in 1927 and is located at 915 N. Central Avenue. On February 20, 2013, the property was listed in the National Register of Historic Places, reference: #13000019.

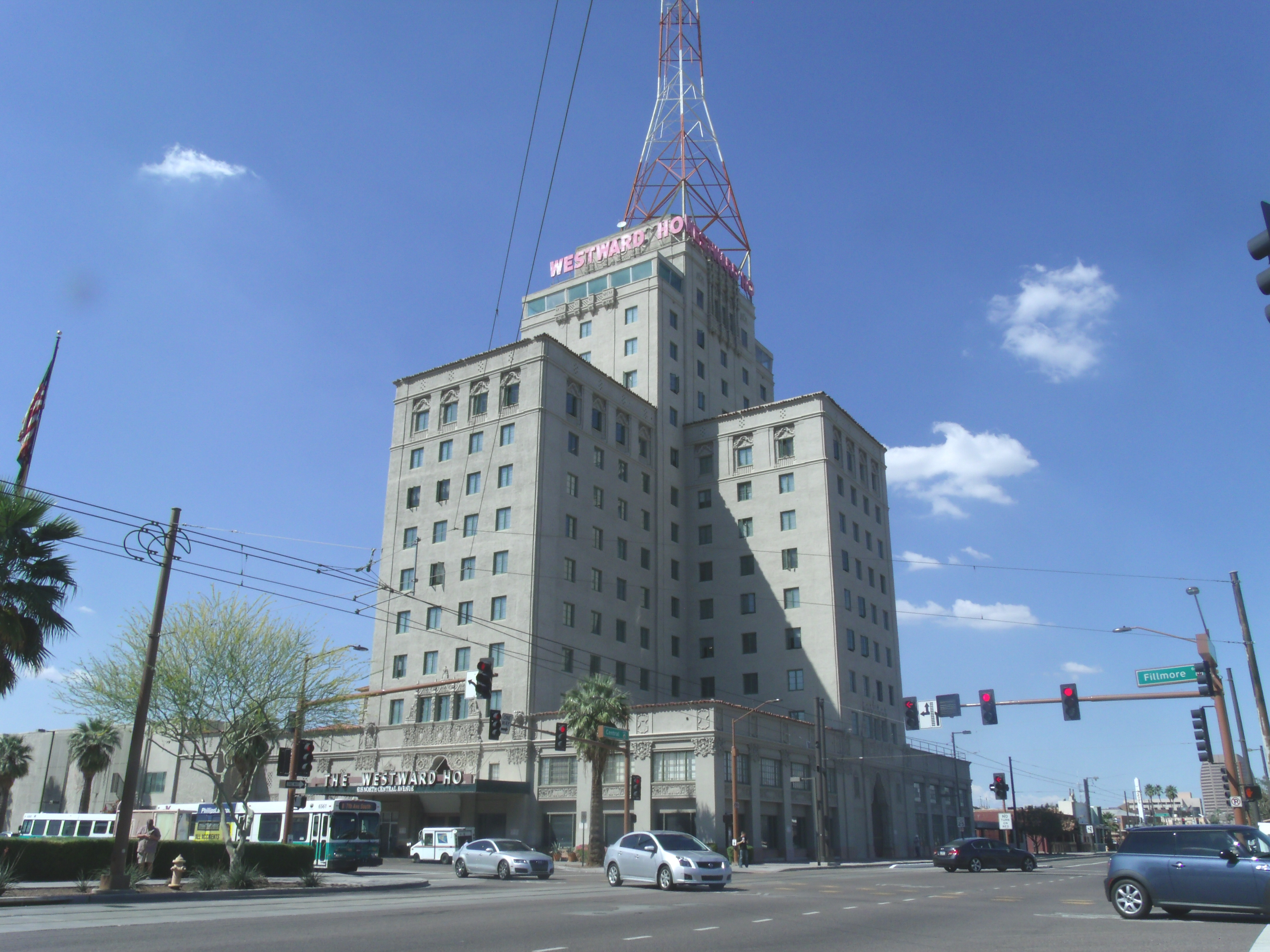
The Westward Ho Hotel was built in 1928 and is located at 618 N. Central Avenue. It was listed in the National Register of Historic Places on February 19, 1982, reference: #82002082.

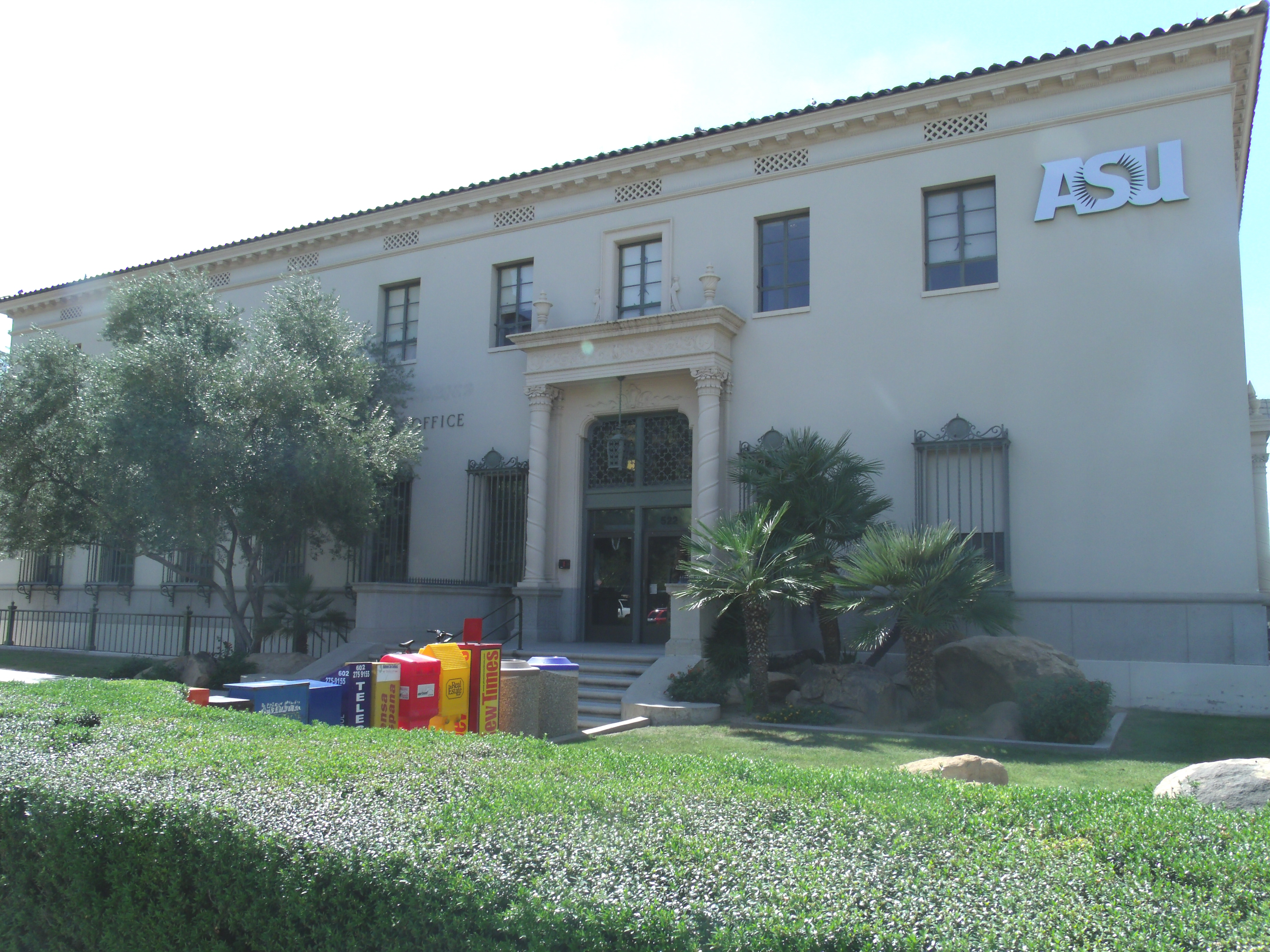
The U.S. Post Office / Federal Building was built 1932–1936 and is located at 522 N. Central Avenue. The building was listed in the Historic Properties in Phoenix Historic Property Register in October 1990. It was listed in the National Register of Historic Places on February 10, 1983, reference #83002993.

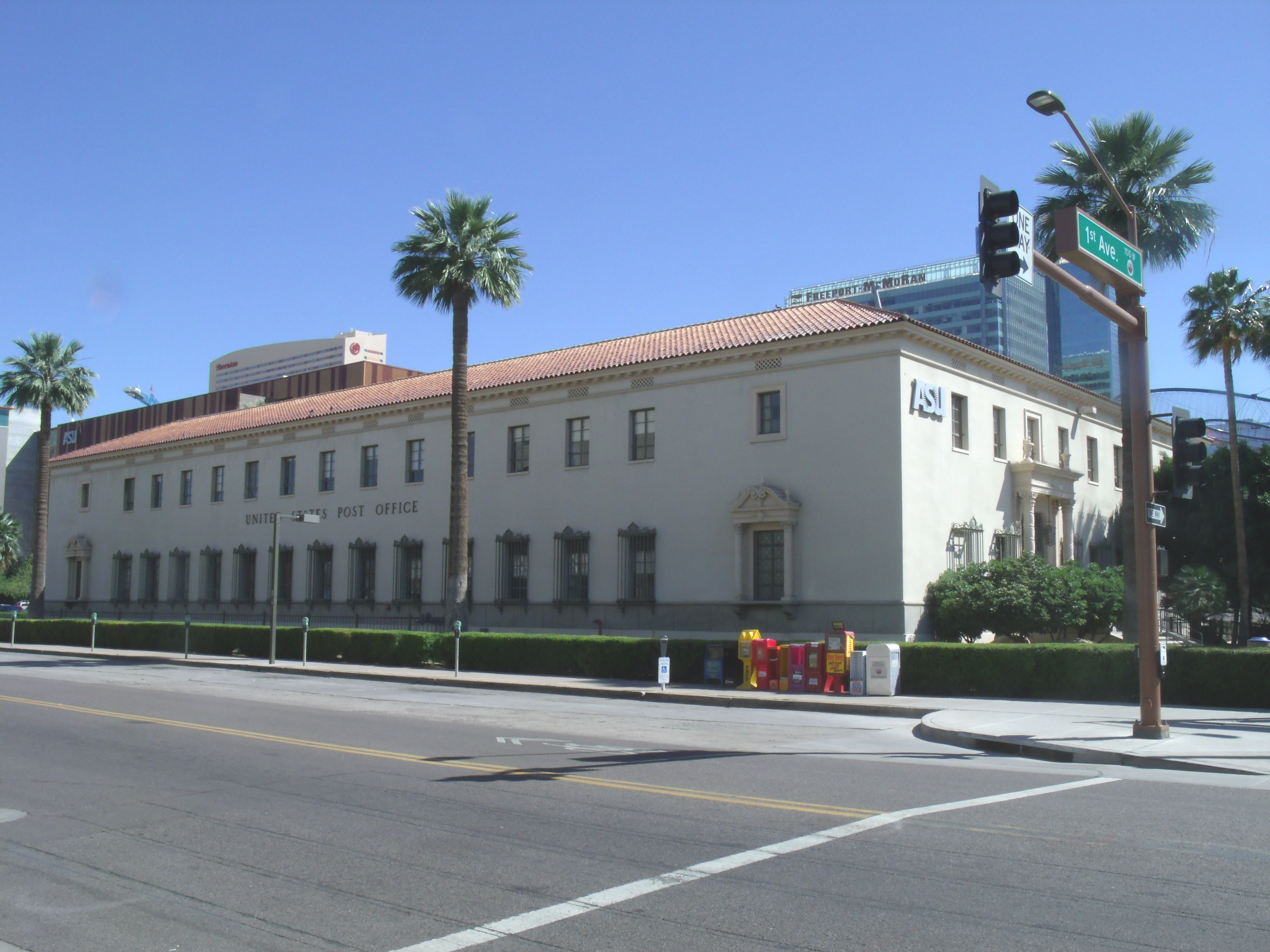
Different view of The U.S. Post Office/Federal Building, which was built 1932–1936 which is located at 522 N. Central Avenue. The building was listed in the Phoenix Historic Property Register in October 1990. It was listed in the National Register of Historic Places on February 10, 1983, reference #83002993.

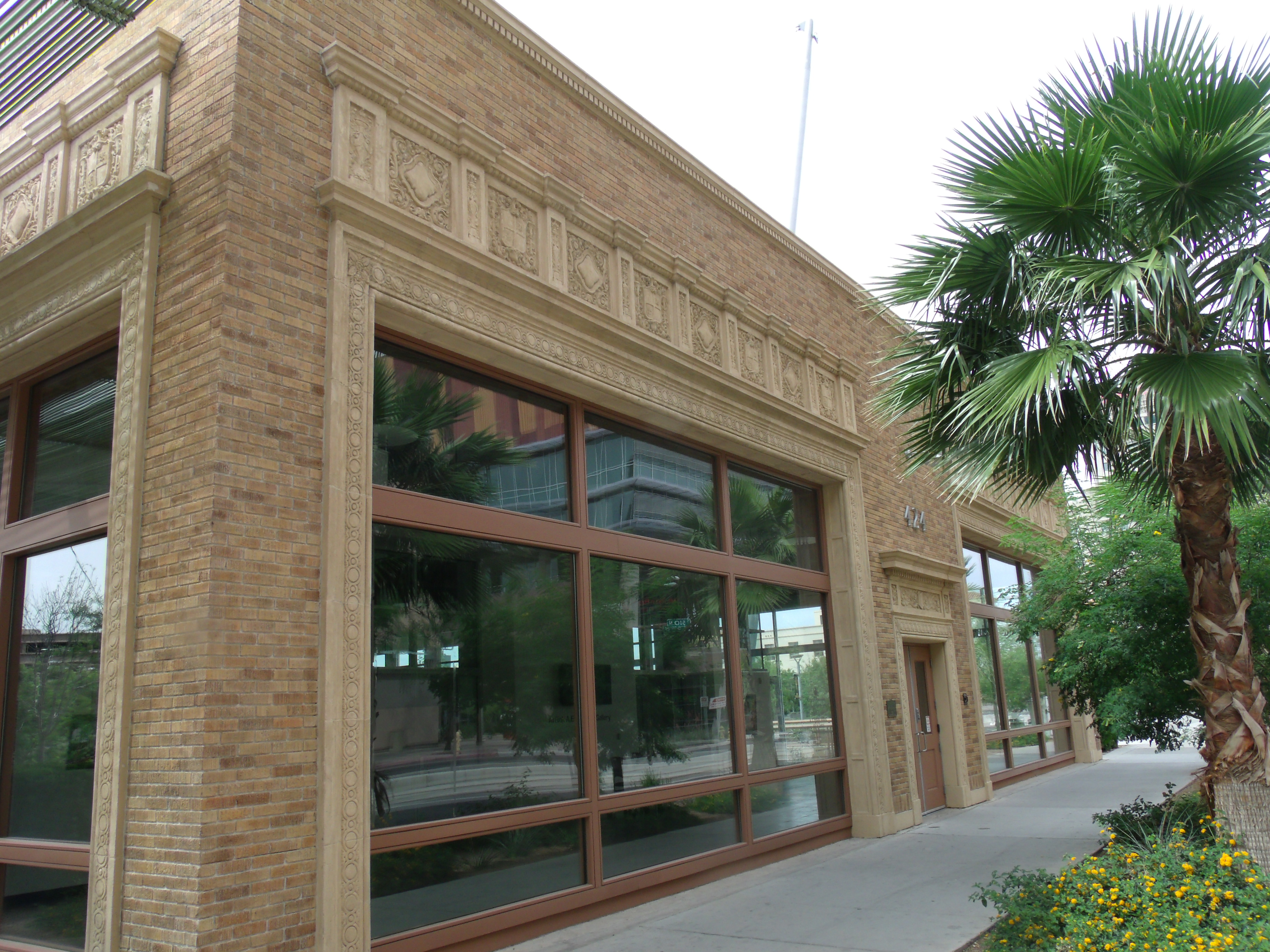
The A.E. England Motors Building was built in 1926 and is located at 424 N. Central Avenue. It is listed in the Phoenix Historic Property Register.

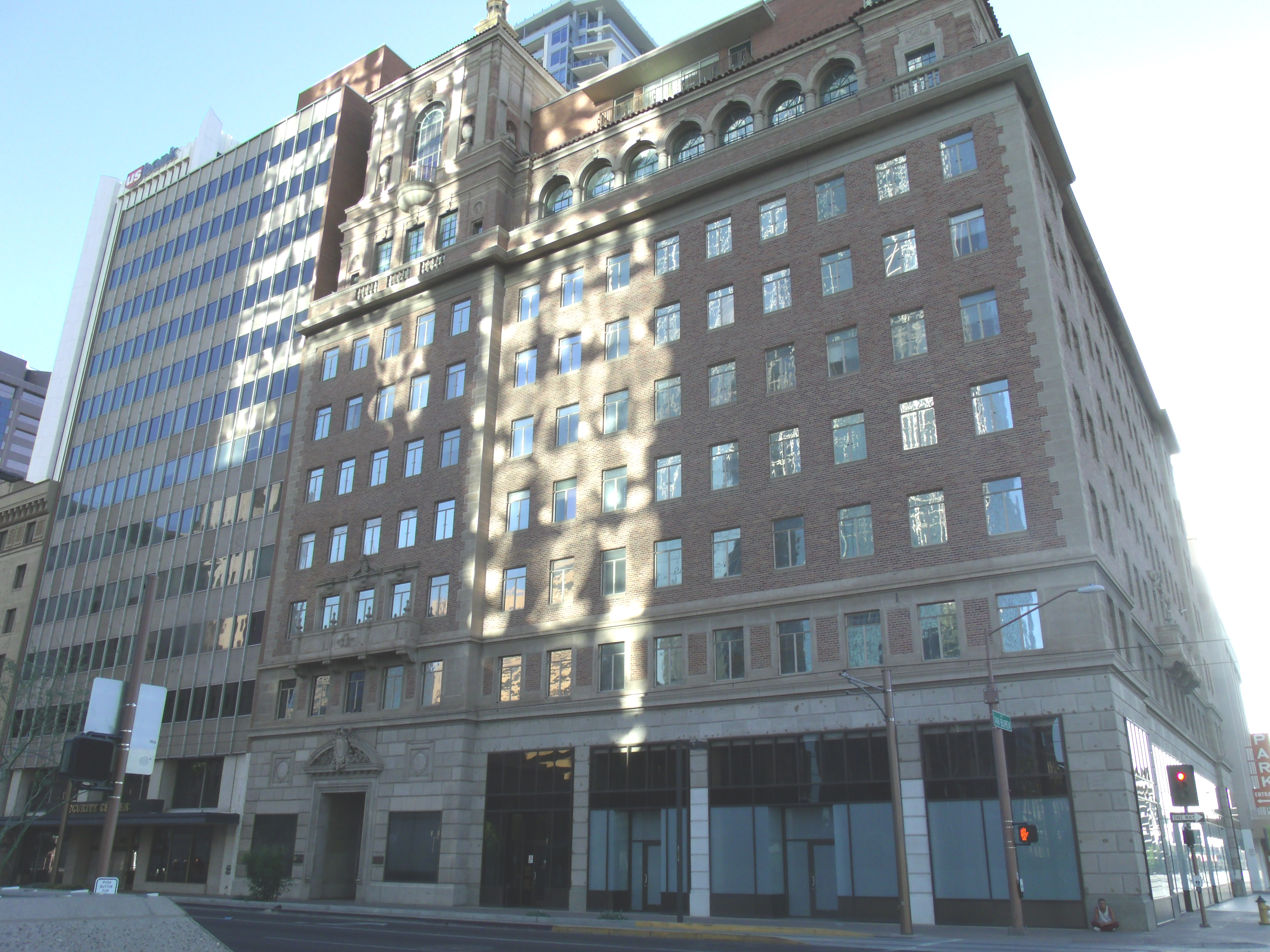
The Security Building was built in 1925 and is located at 234 N. Central Avenue. The property is Listed in the National Register of Historic Places.

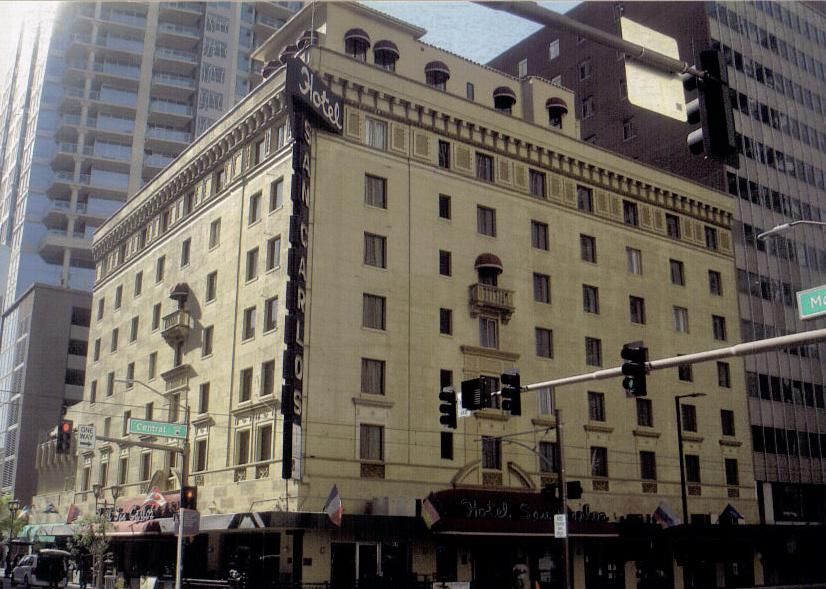
The San Carlos Hotel, also known as Hotel San Carlos, was built in 1925 and is located at 202 N. Central Avenue. Mae West, Clark Gable, Carole Lombard, Marilyn Monroe and Gene Autry are among the celebrities who at one time stayed at the San Carlos. The hotel was added to the National Register of Historic Places in 1983. Reference number 83003498.

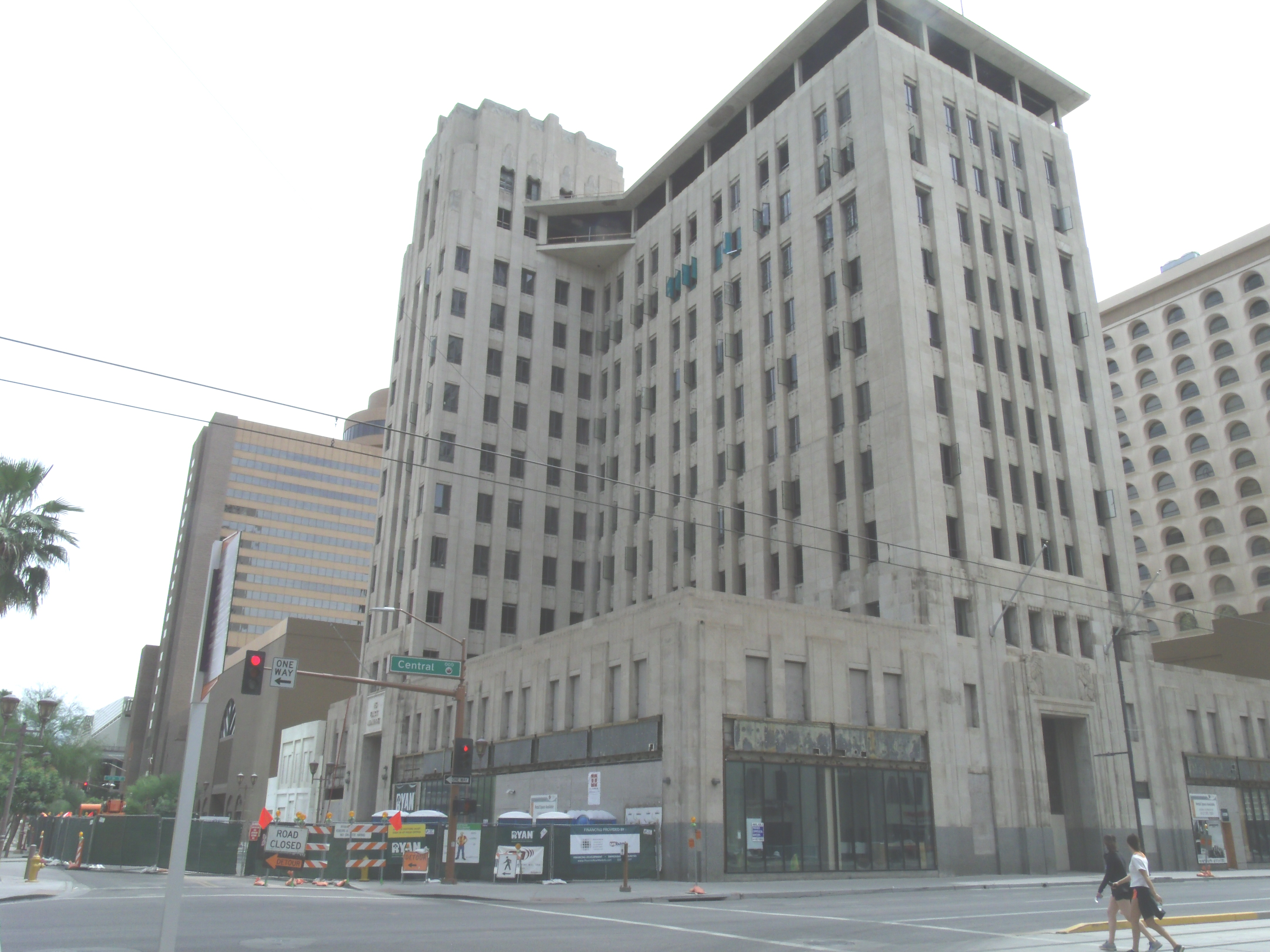
The Professional Building built in 1931 and located at 137 N. Central Avenue. It was listed in the National Register of Historic Places in 1993, reference: #85003563.

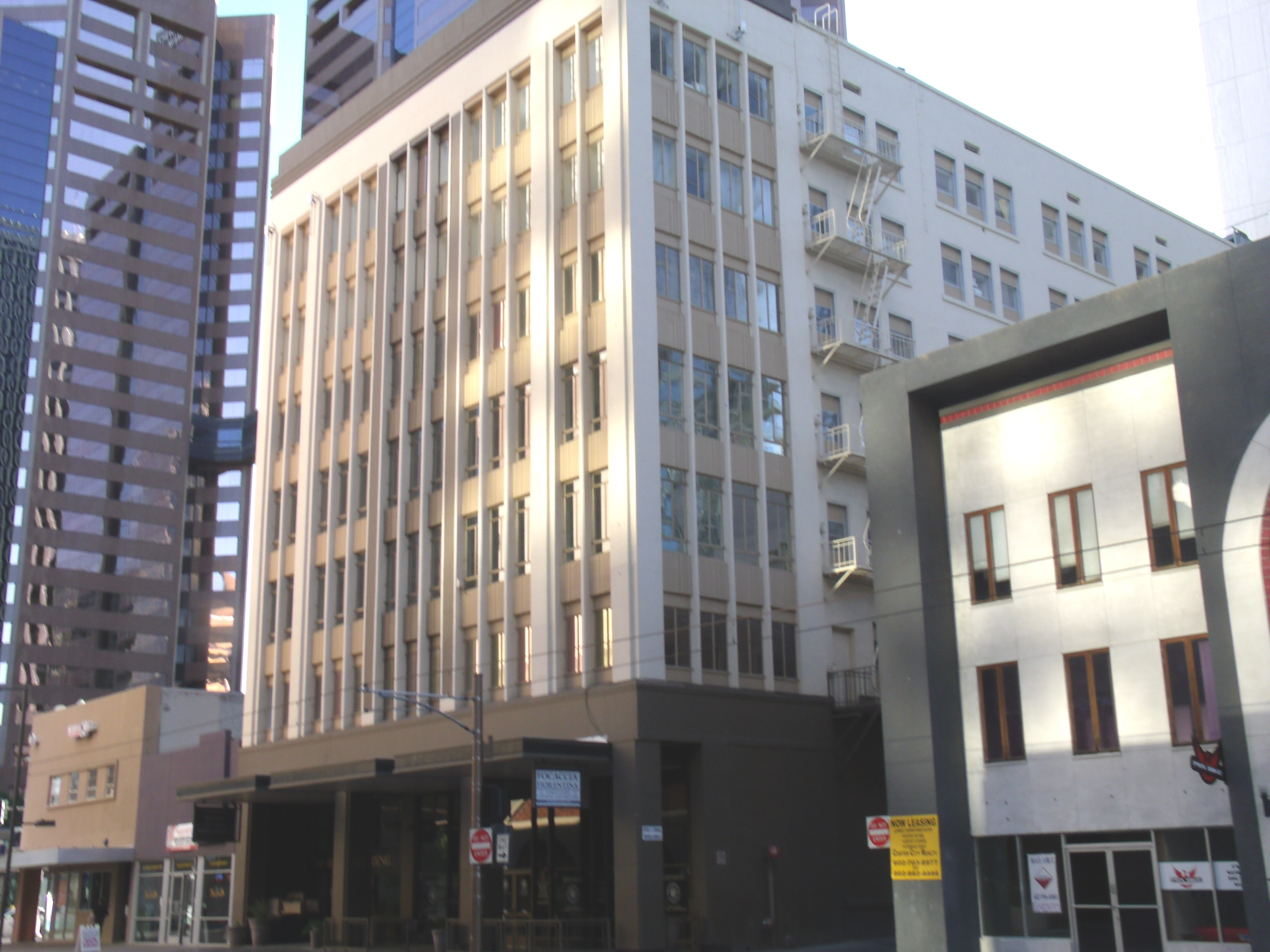
The Heard Building was built in 1920 and is located at 112 N. Central Avenue. It was Phoenix's first skyscraper. The building, which was listed in the National register of Historic Places on September 4, 1985, reference: #85002059, was featured in Alfred Hitchcocks 1960 film "Psycho".

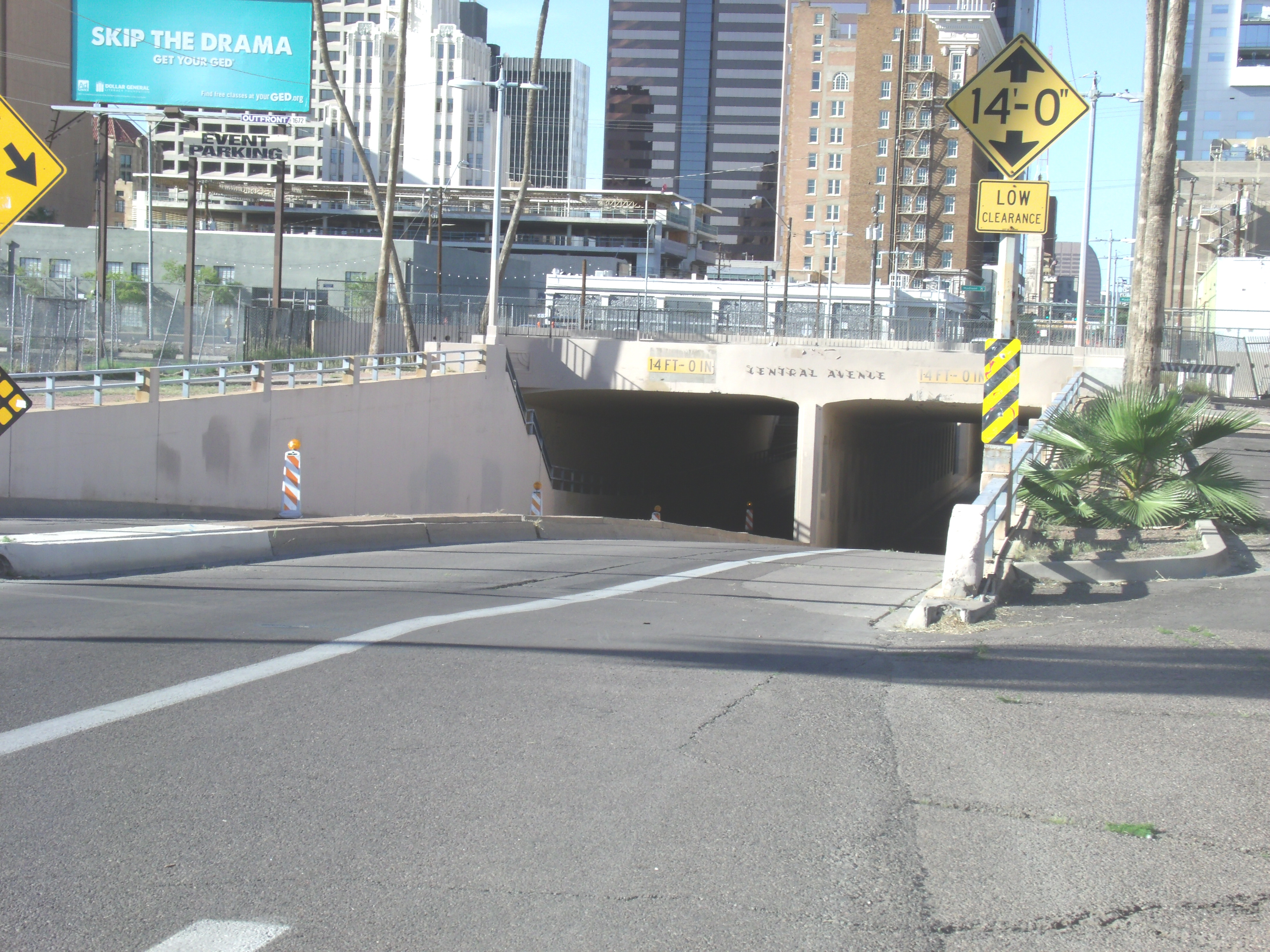
The Central Avenue Underpass was built in 1940. The above bridge was originally built for the ATSF railway.

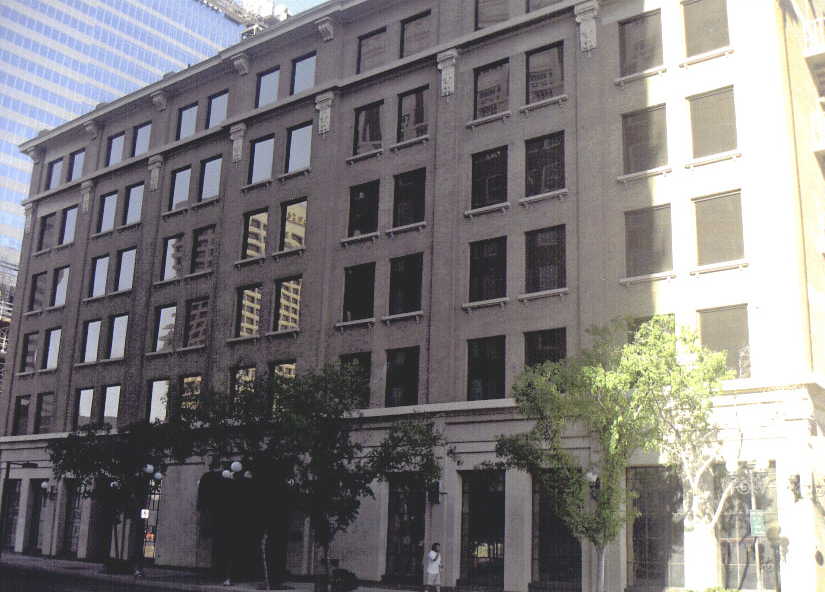
The Jefferson Hotel was built in 1915 and is located at 101 S. Central Avenue in Phoenix. It is no longer a hotel and is called the Barrister Place Building. The building is owned by the city of Phoenix and is currently the home to the Phoenix Police Museum. It is listed in the Phoenix Historic Property Register.

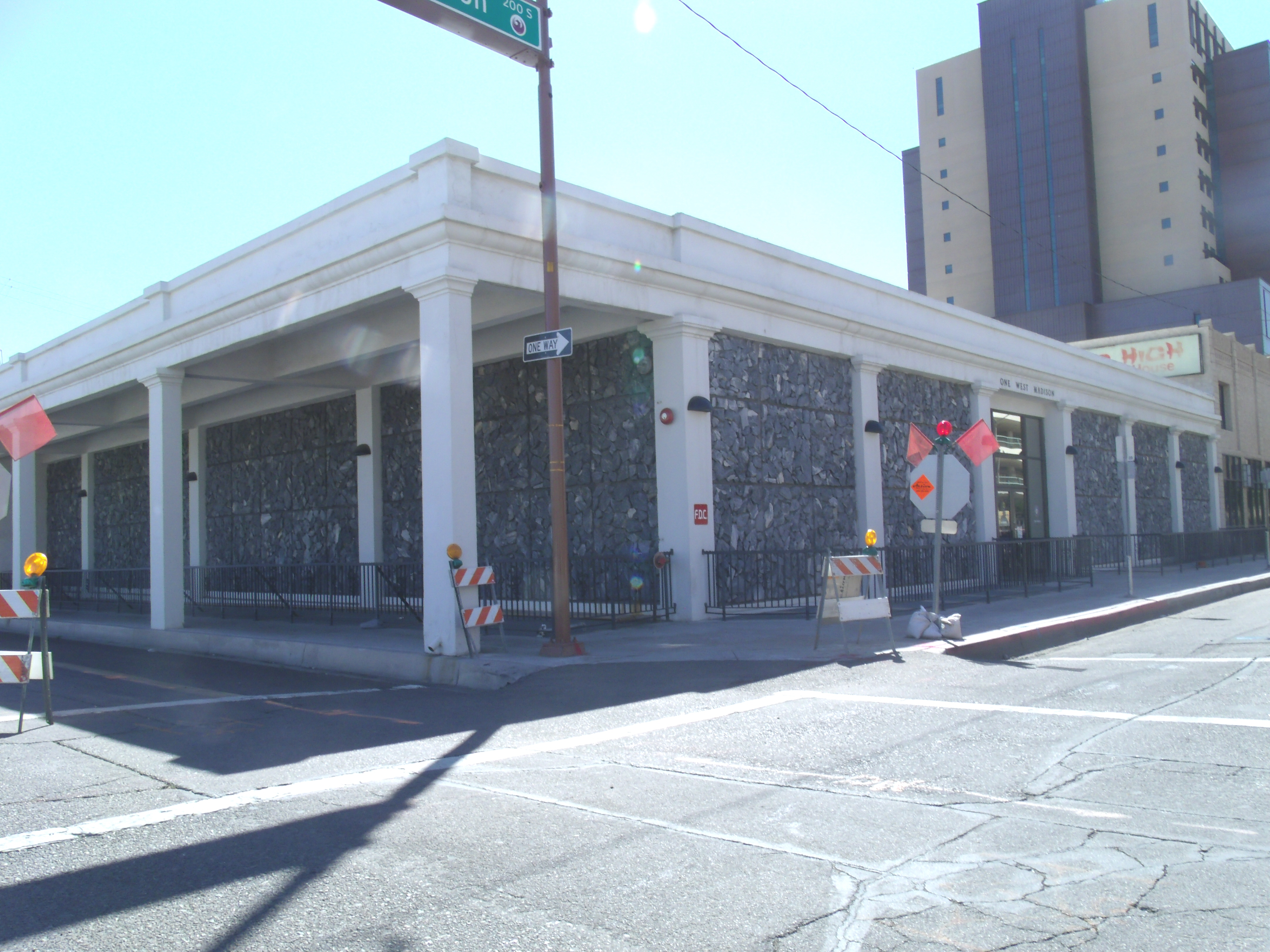
The Pratt-Gilbert Building was built in 1913 and is located at 200 S. Central Avenue / 1 W. Madison Street. It was listed in the Phoenix Historic Properties Register in October 2001.

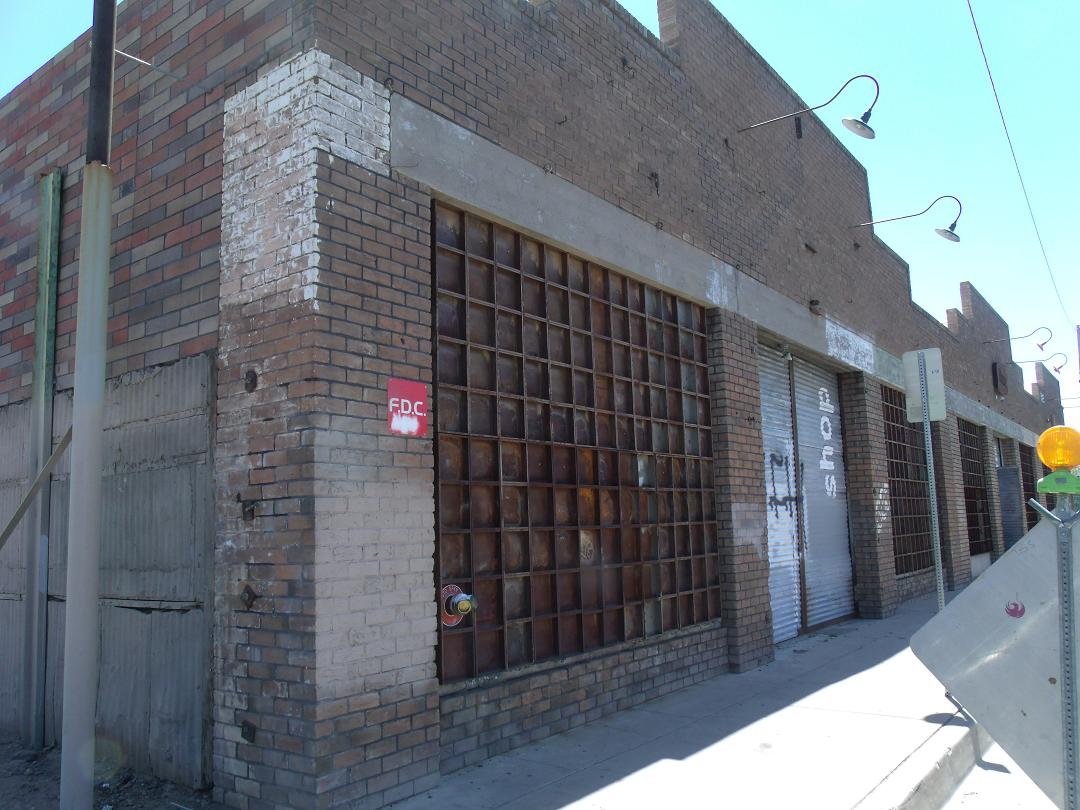
The Anchor Manufacturing Co., also known as 41-3, was built in 1925. It is located at 525 (525-551) S. Central Avenue. The building was listed in the National Register of Historic Places in 1985, reference: #85002042.

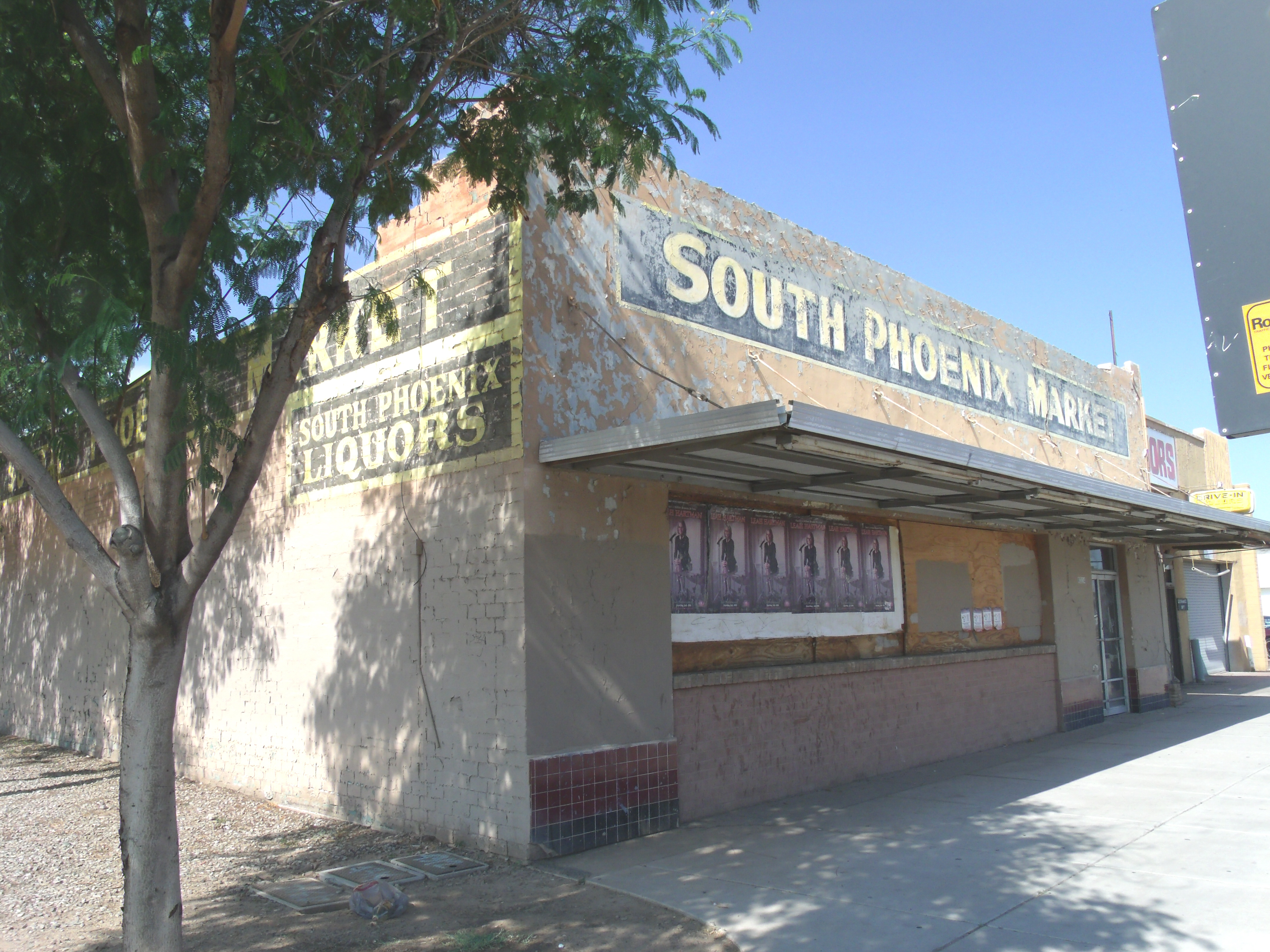
The South Phoenix Market building was built in 1948 and is located at 4341 S. Central Avenue. This property is recognized as historic by the Asian American Historic Property Survey of the City of Phoenix.

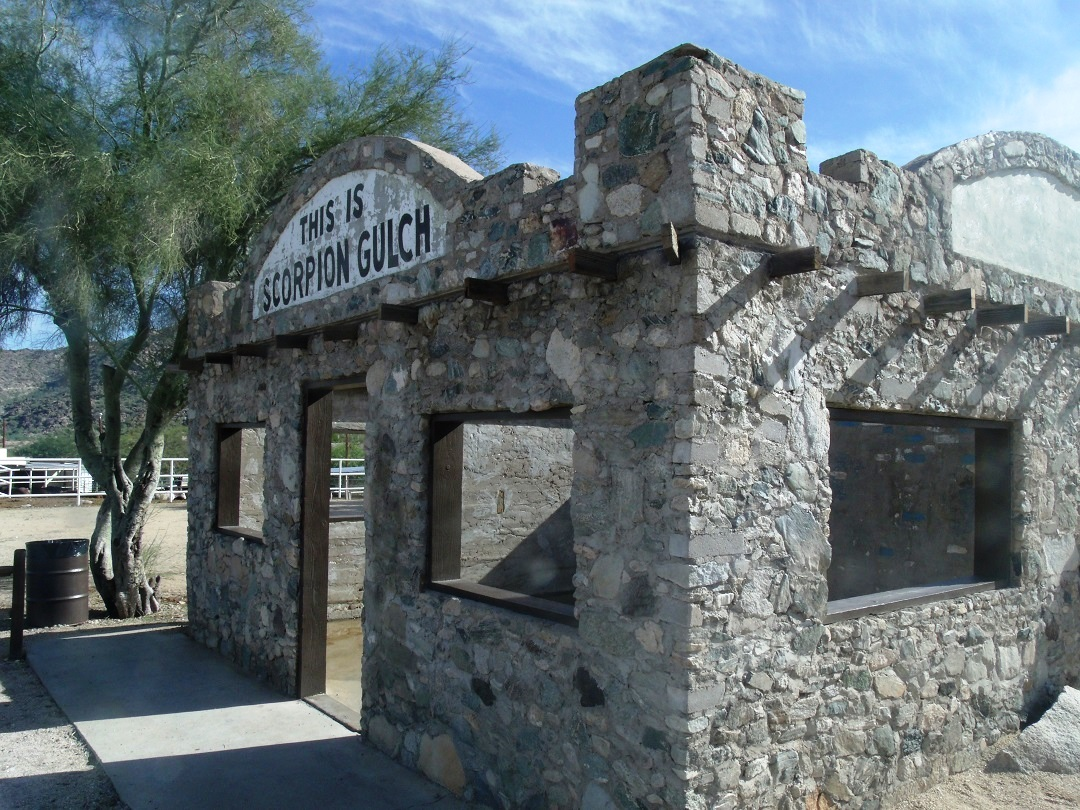
The Scorpion Gulch store was built in 1936 by William Lunsford. It is located at 10225 S. Central Avenue in South Mountain Park. It was listed in the Phoenix Historic Property Register in October 1990.

== Cemeteries ==
The Pioneers' Cemetery Association (PCA) defines an "historic cemetery" as one which has been in existence for more than fifty years. There are various historic cemeteries which were established in the late 19th century. These cemeteries serve as the final resting place of various notable citizens of Arizona. Among which can be found pioneers, governors, congressman, government officials, journalists, race car drivers, soldiers, actors and actresses.

The four historic cemeteries listed are:

- Crosscut Cemetery sometimes referred to the Williams Crosscut Cemetery – Established in 1870.
- Pioneer and Military Memorial Park – Seven historic cemeteries founded in 1884.
- St. Francis Catholic Cemetery – Established in 1897
- Greenwood/Memory Lawn Mortuary & Cemetery – Established in 1906.

=== Crosscut Cemetery ===
The Crosscut Cemetery, a.k.a. the Williams Crosscut Cemetery, was established in 1870 by John Wesley and Amanda "Manda" Williams. The historic cemetery, which at the time was located in the desert far from central Phoenix, is the oldest pioneer cemetery in Phoenix. It is located in what is now the corner of 48th St. and East. Van Buren St. Many of the headstones are missing and some of the graves vandalized. The cemetery, which continues to belong to the Williams family, has a locked gate and a chained-linked fence with barbered wire surrounding it.

Graves and headstones in the Crosscut Cemetery

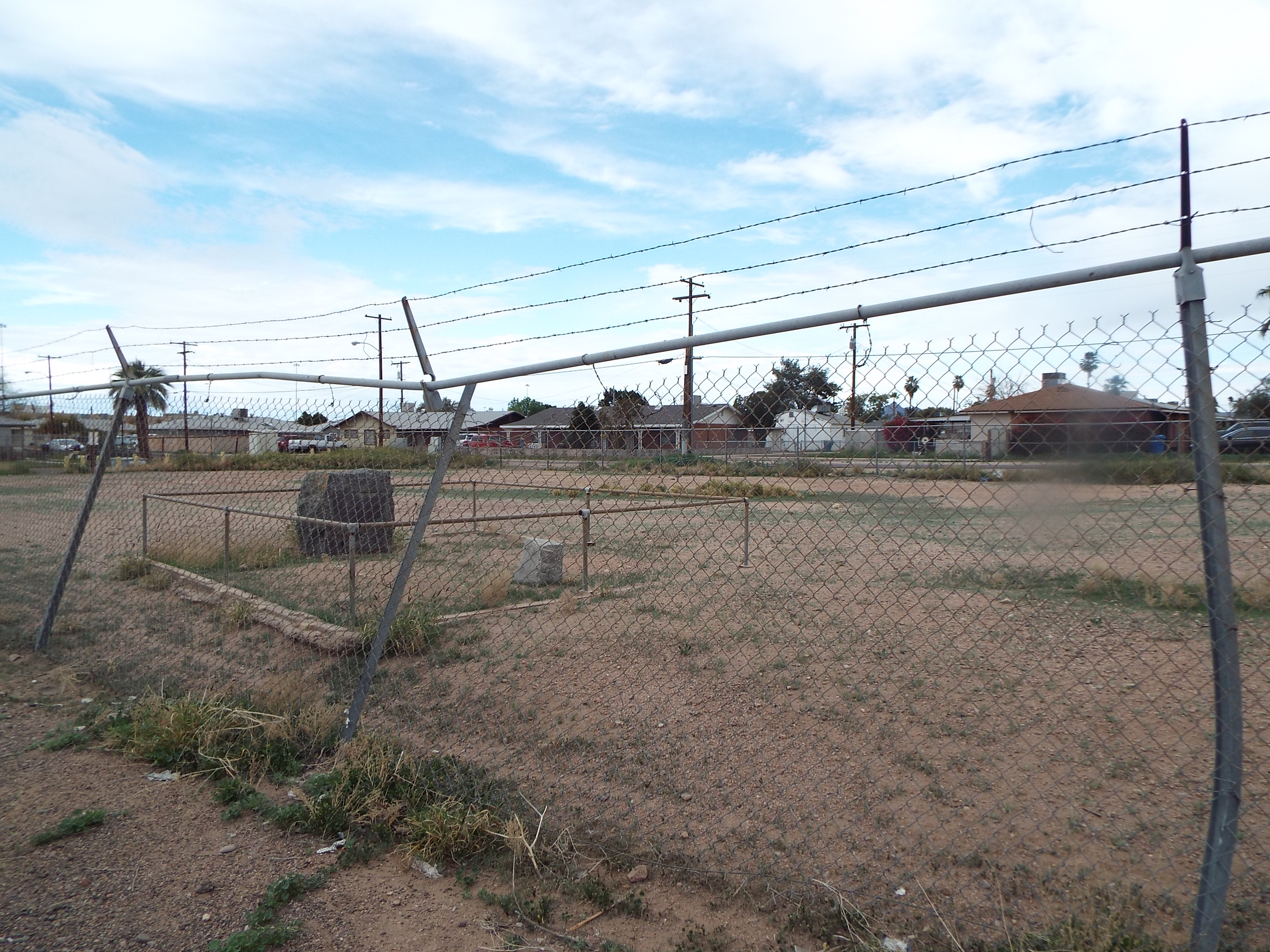
Crosscut Cemetery

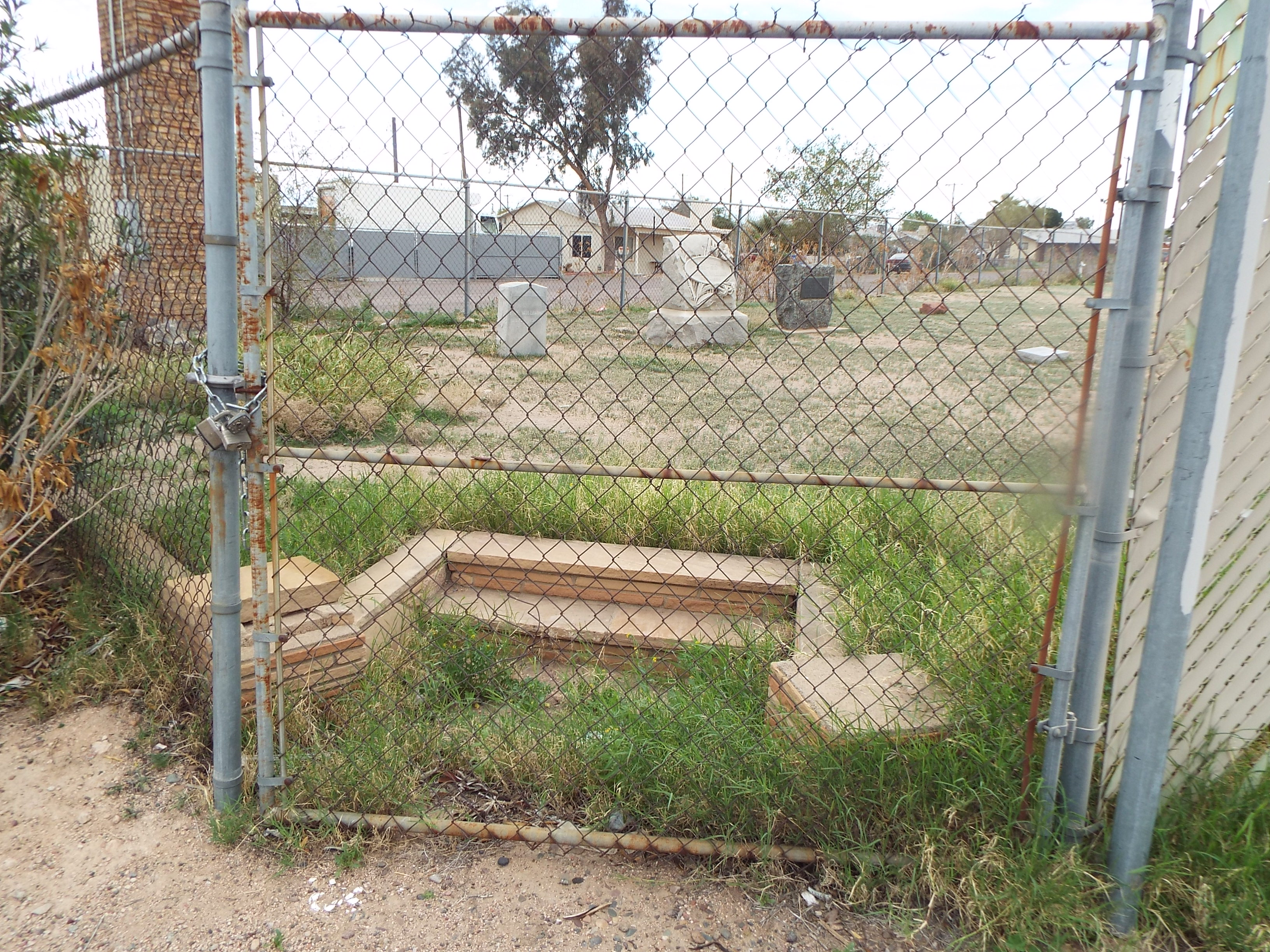
Chained and locked entrance of the Phoenix Crosscut Cemetery.

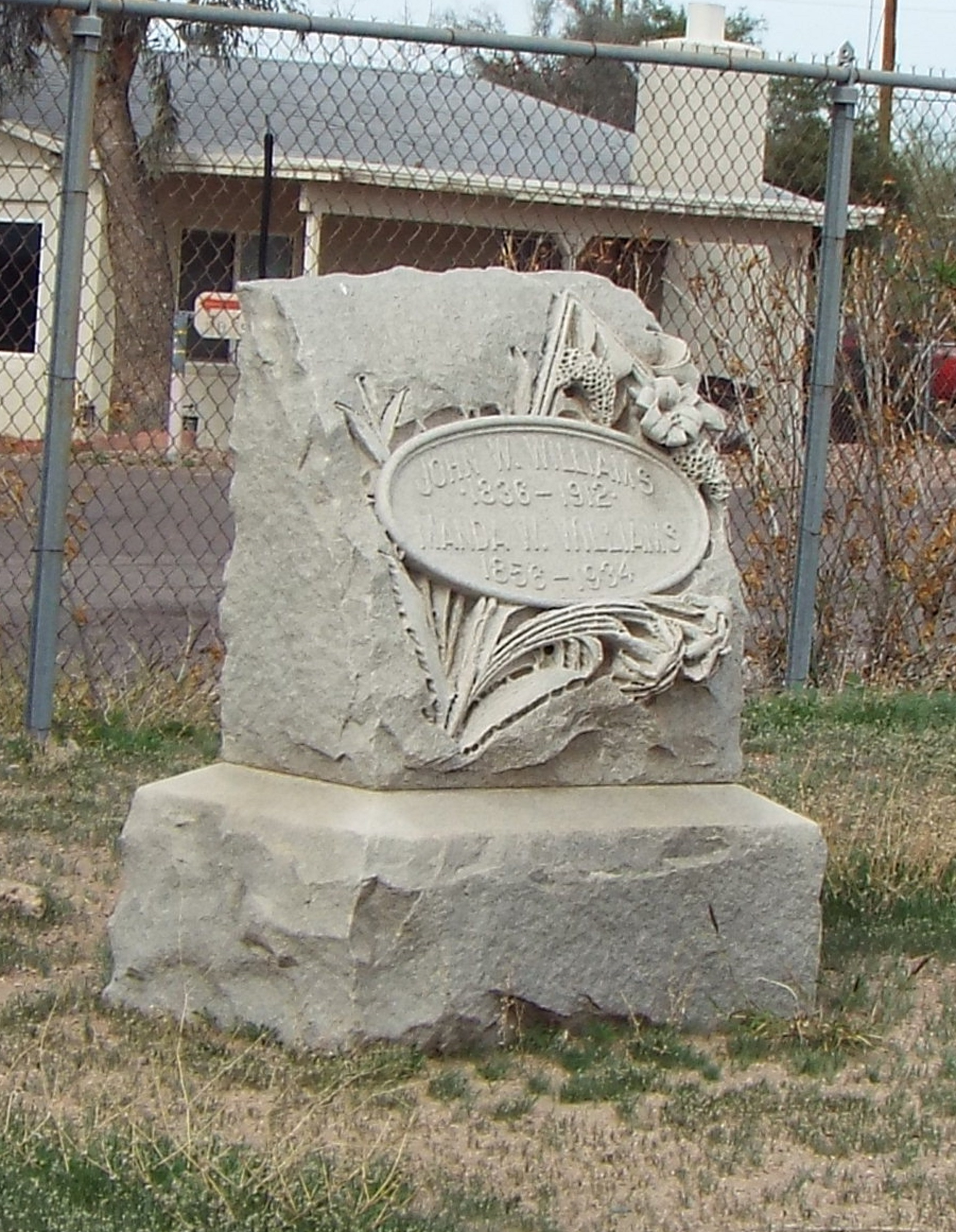
Grave of John Wesley Williams (1836–1912) and Manda W. Williams (1856–1934). John and Manda (Amanda) were the owners of a large farm. They established the cemetery in their property.

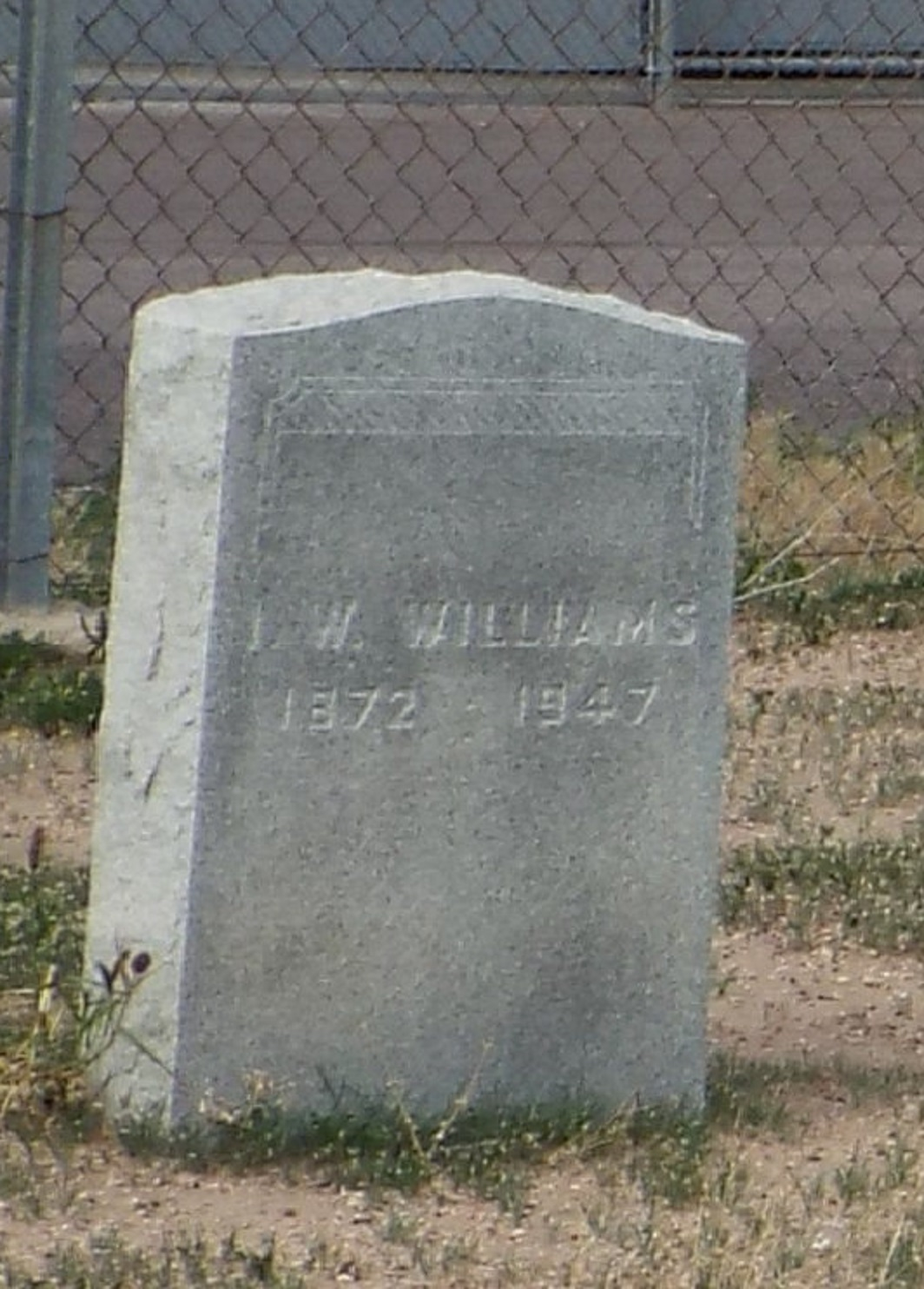
Grave of J. W. Williams (1872–1947), son of John and Manda.

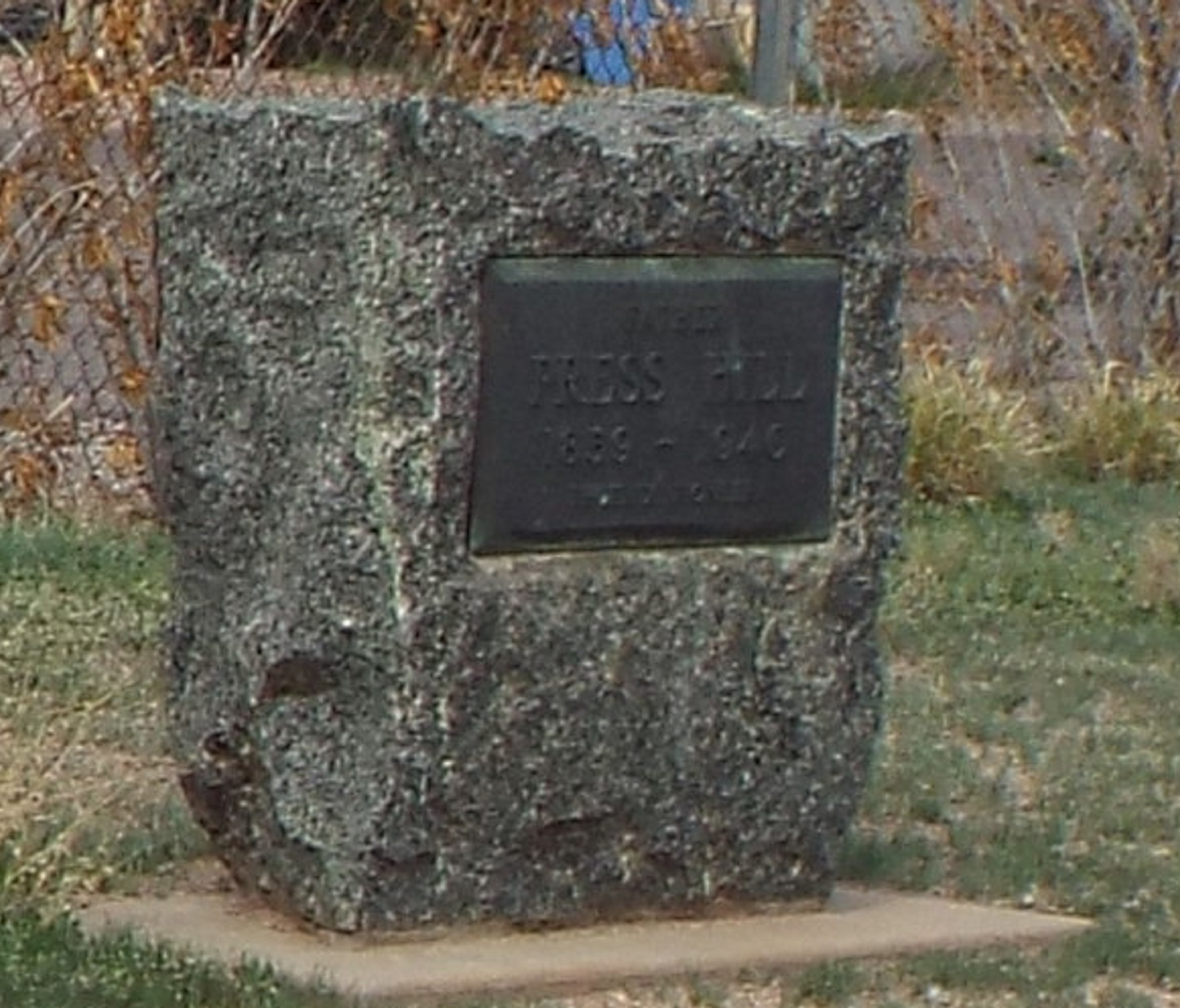
Grave of Allen Preston Hill (1859–1940). Mr. Hill served as superintendent of the Arizona State Hospital Farm.

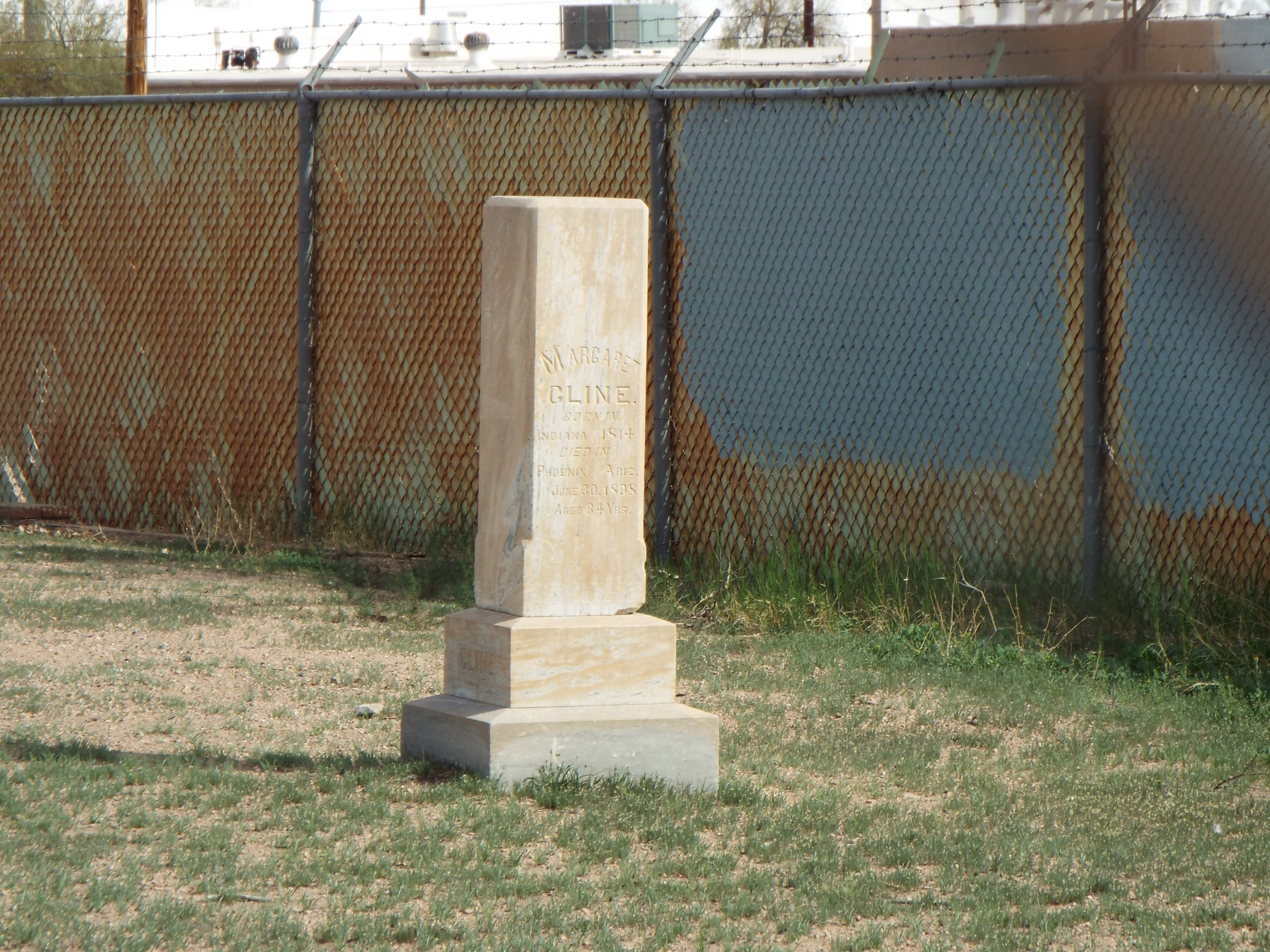
Grave of Christian Christopher Cline (1810–1898) and his wife Margaret Cline (1814–1898). The Clines brought the first cattle into the Tonto Basin in 1876.

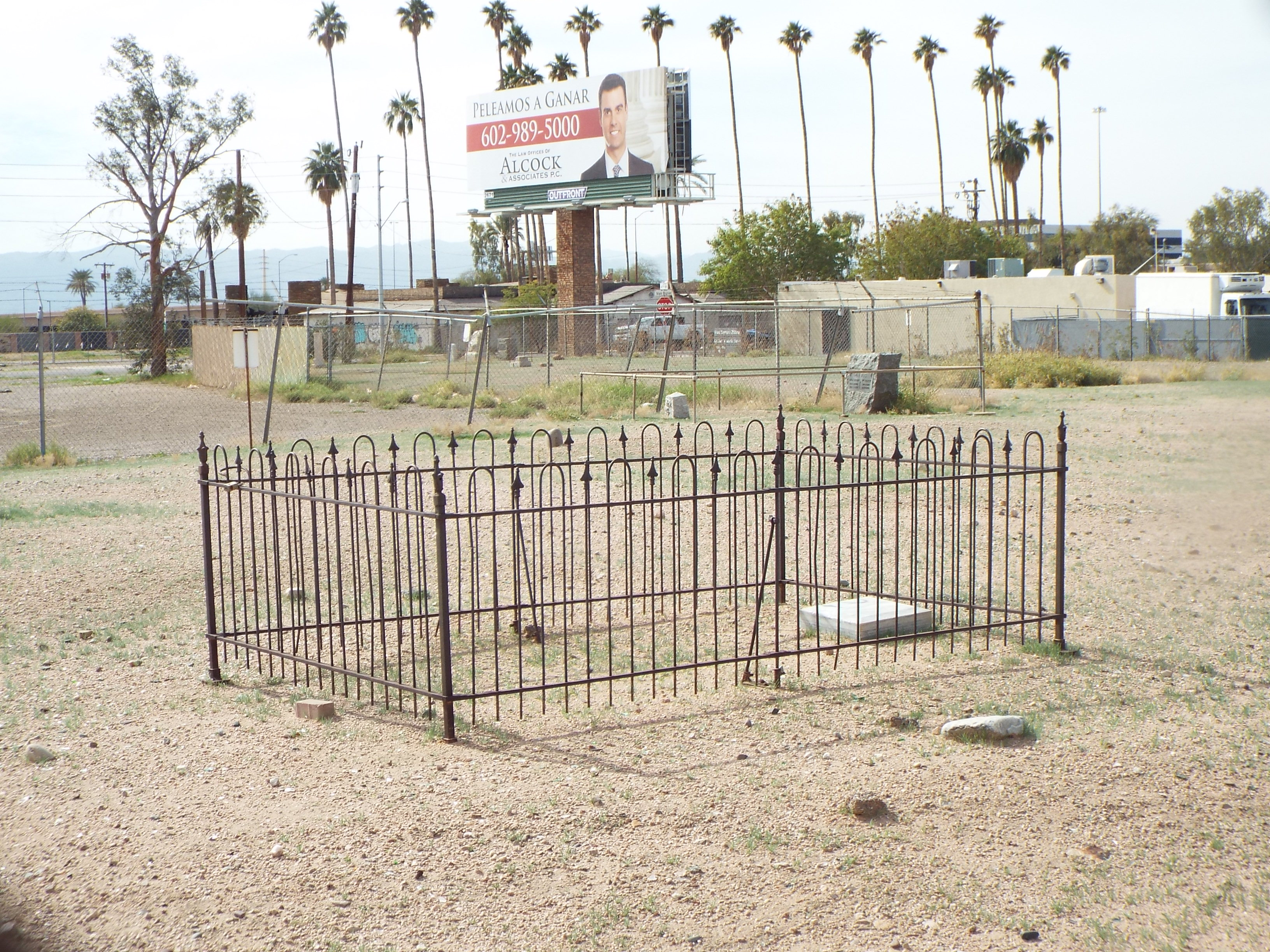
Grave of James Ansley Young (1822–1877). Young was the first Justice of Peace of Phoenix.

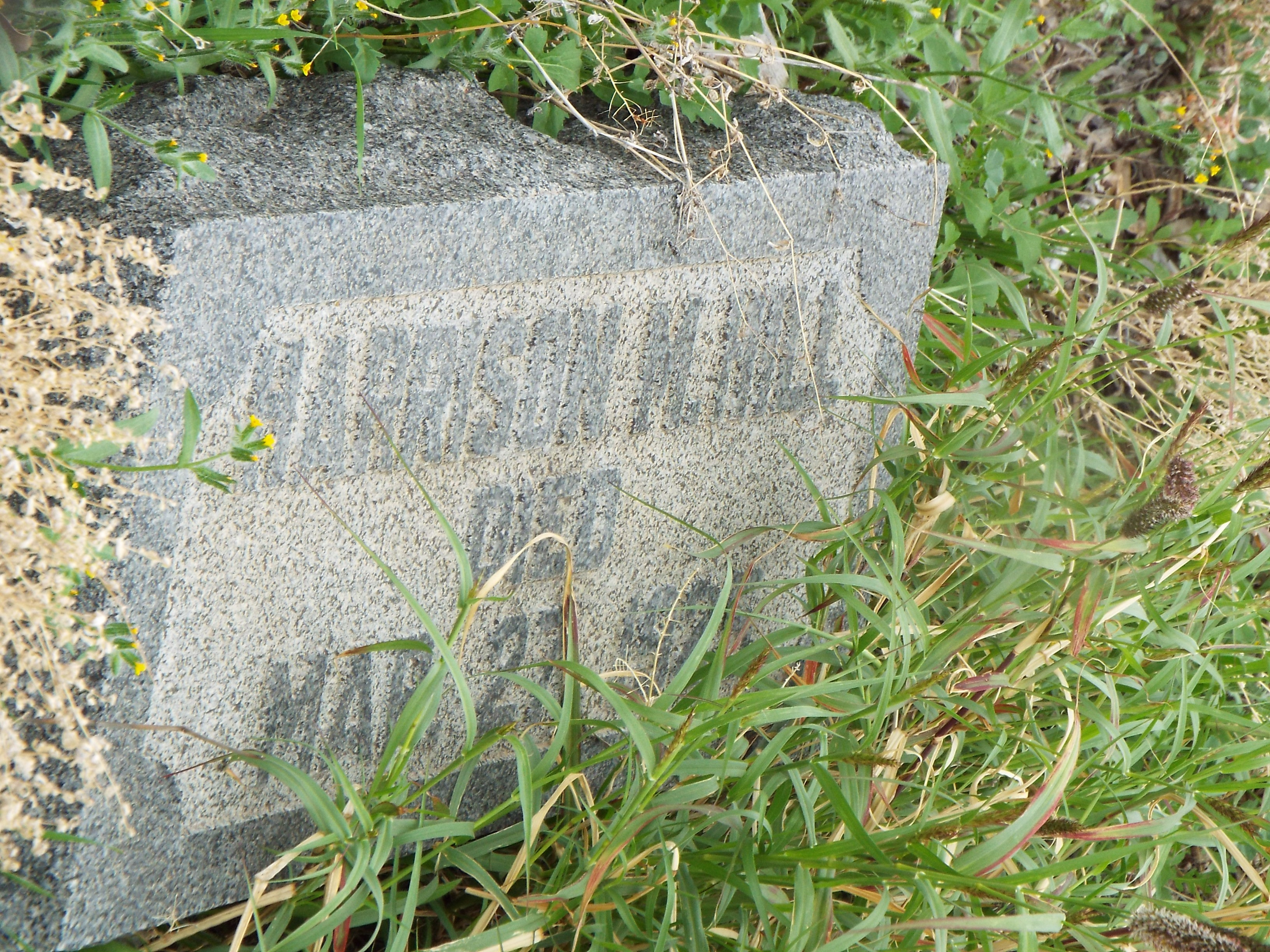
Grave of Harrison Monroe "Harry" Hill (1864–1925)

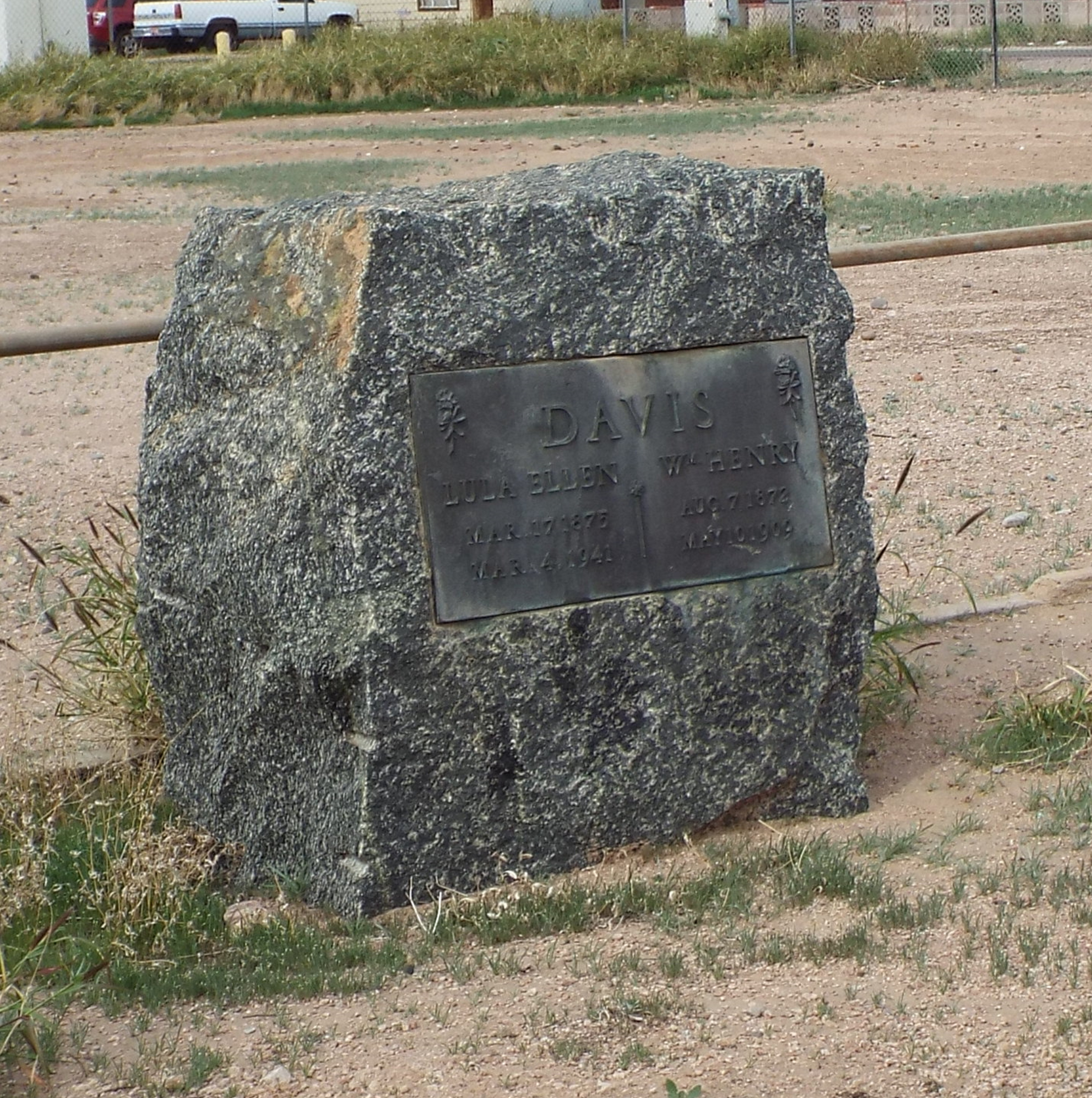
Lula Davis (1875–1941) and William Davis (1872–1901). William Davis worked in the wholesale department of the Wakelin Grocery Company. He died from Pulmonary Tuberculosis.

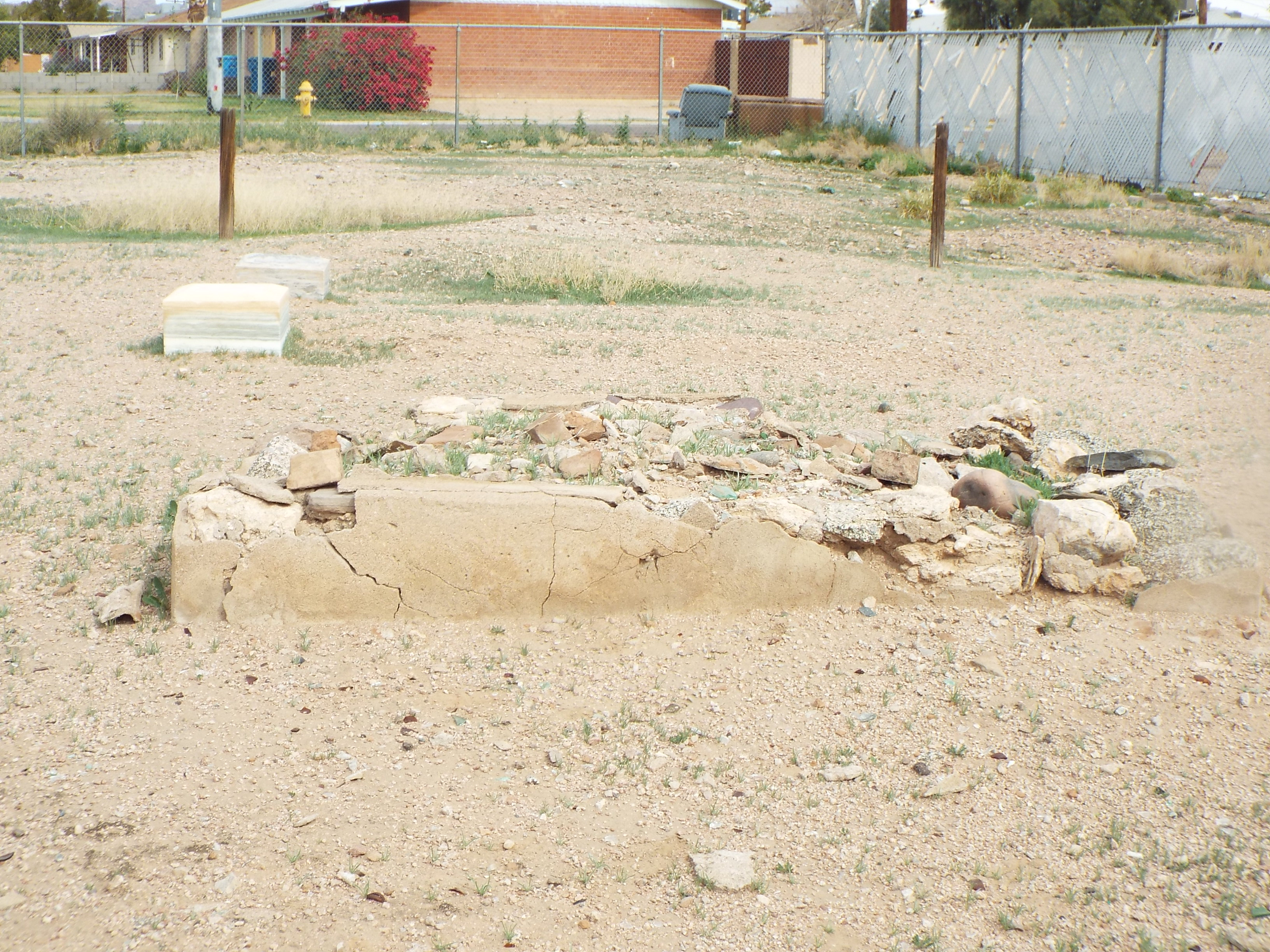
Vandalized grave.

=== Pioneer and Military Memorial Park ===
The Pioneer and Military Memorial Park is the official name given to seven historic cemeteries in Phoenix. The cemeteries were founded in 1884 in what was known as "Block 32". On February 1, 2007, "Block 32" was renamed Pioneer and Military Memorial Park.

Graves and headstones in the Pioneer and Military Memorial Park
(Listed in the National Register of Historic Places)

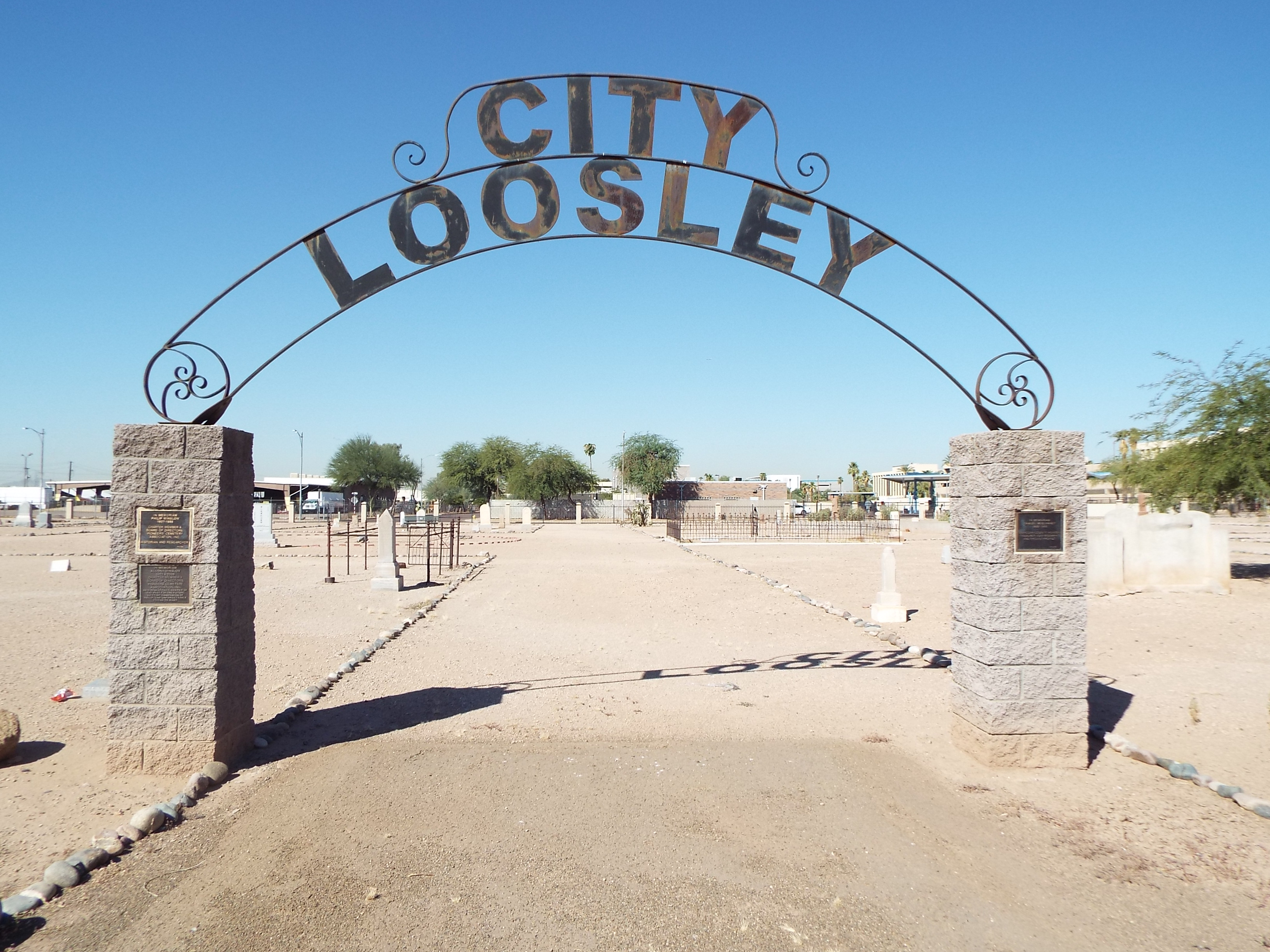
Entrance of the City/Loosley Cemetery section

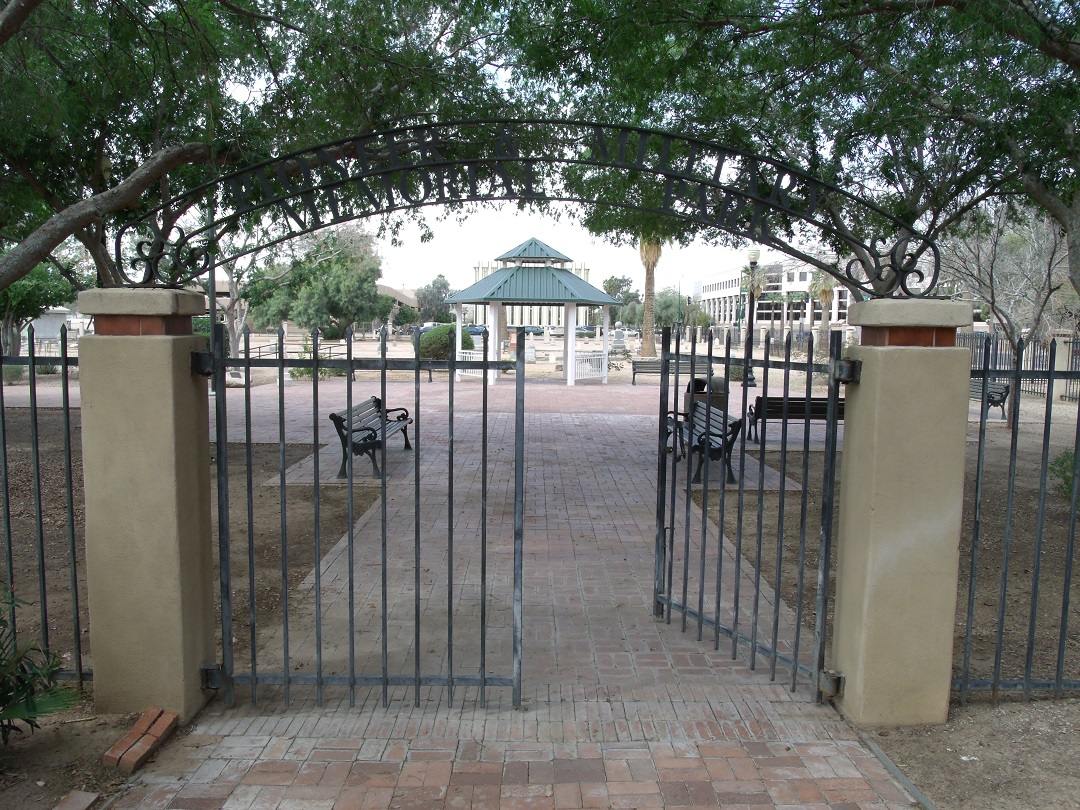
Entrance of the historic Pioneer Military and Memorial Park. The Cemetery dates back to 1884. The main entrance is located at 1317 W. Jefferson Street. The Pioneer & Military Memorial Park was listed in the National Register of Historic Places on February 1, 2007, reference #06001317.

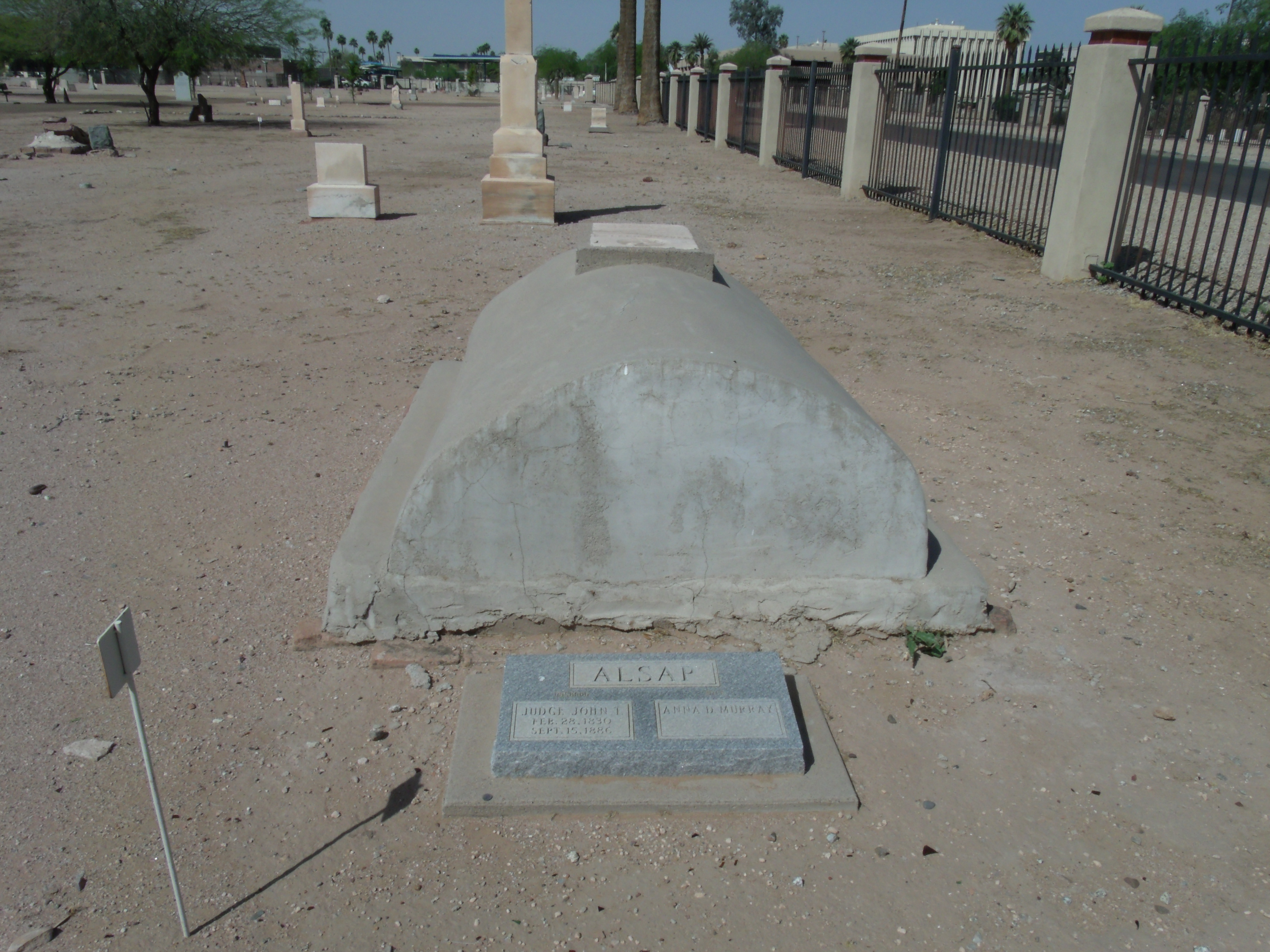
The grave of John T. Alsap in the "Masons Cemetery" section. Alsap was the first Mayor of Phoenix.

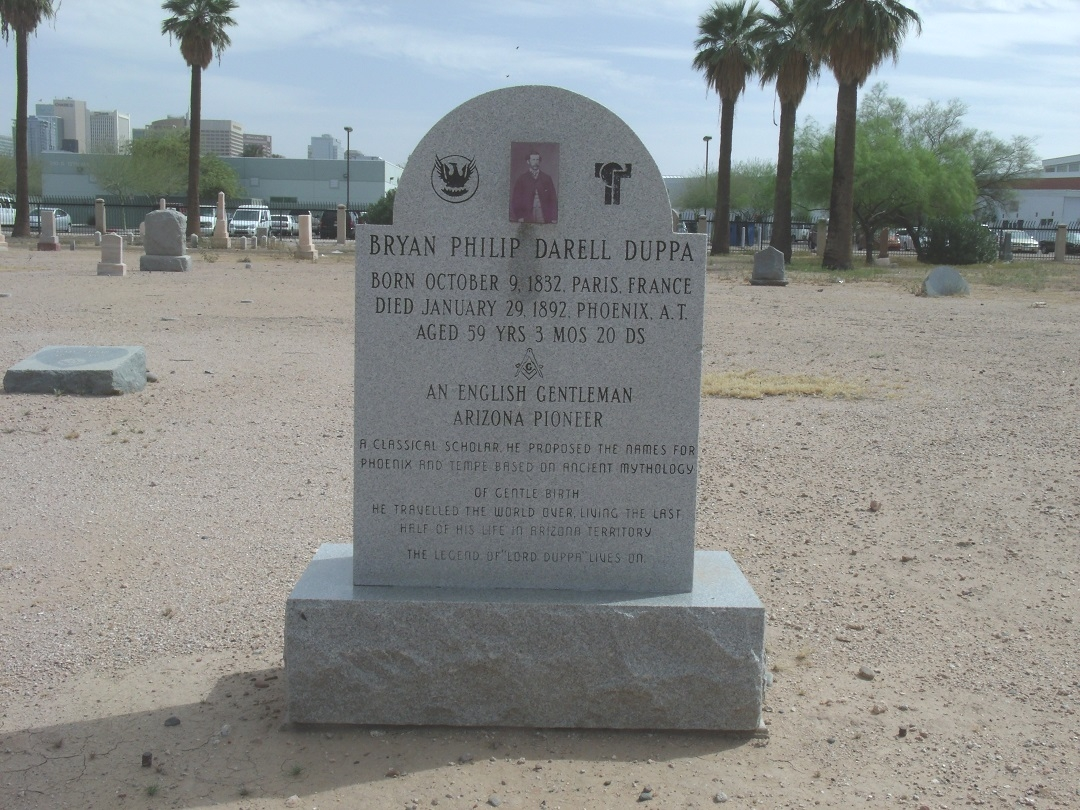
Grave site of Phillip "Lord" Darrell Duppa located in the "Masons Cemetery" section. Duppa is credited with naming "Phoenix" and "Tempe" and the founding of the town of New River, Arizona.

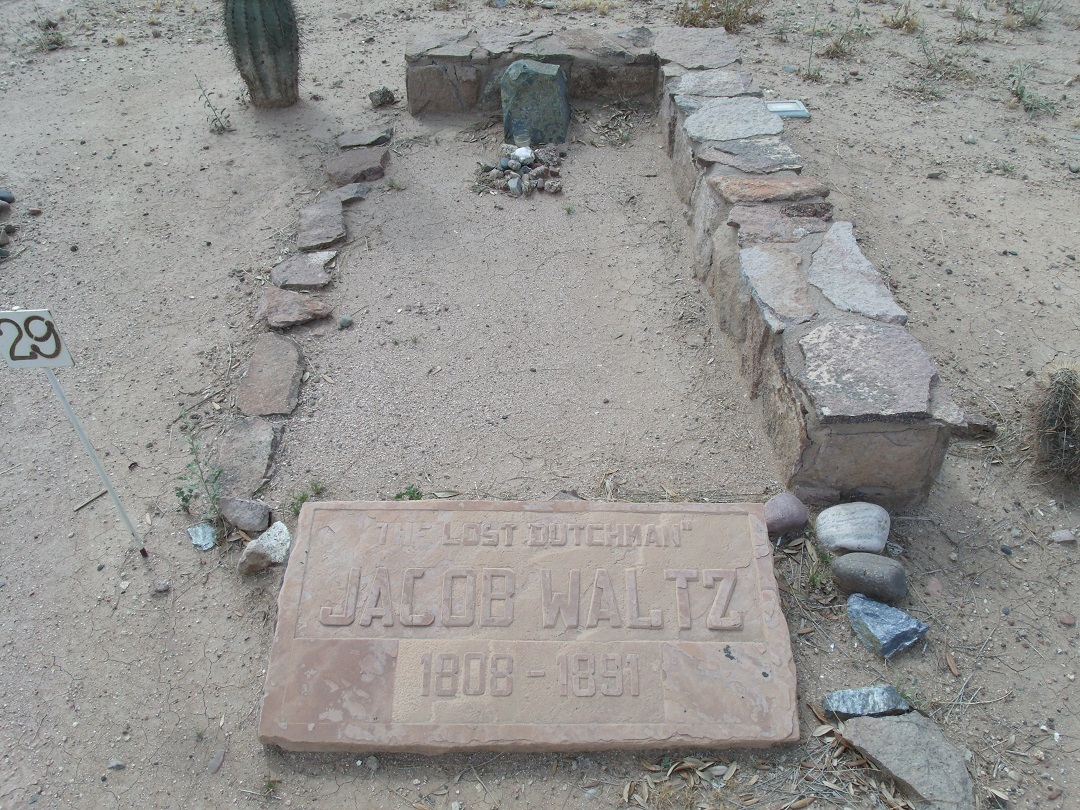
Grave site of Jacob "Dutchman" Waltz located in the "City/Loosley Cemetery" section. Waltz was a German immigrant who in the 19th century discovered a gold mine in Arizona and kept its location a secret, hence the name "Lost Dutchman's Mine".

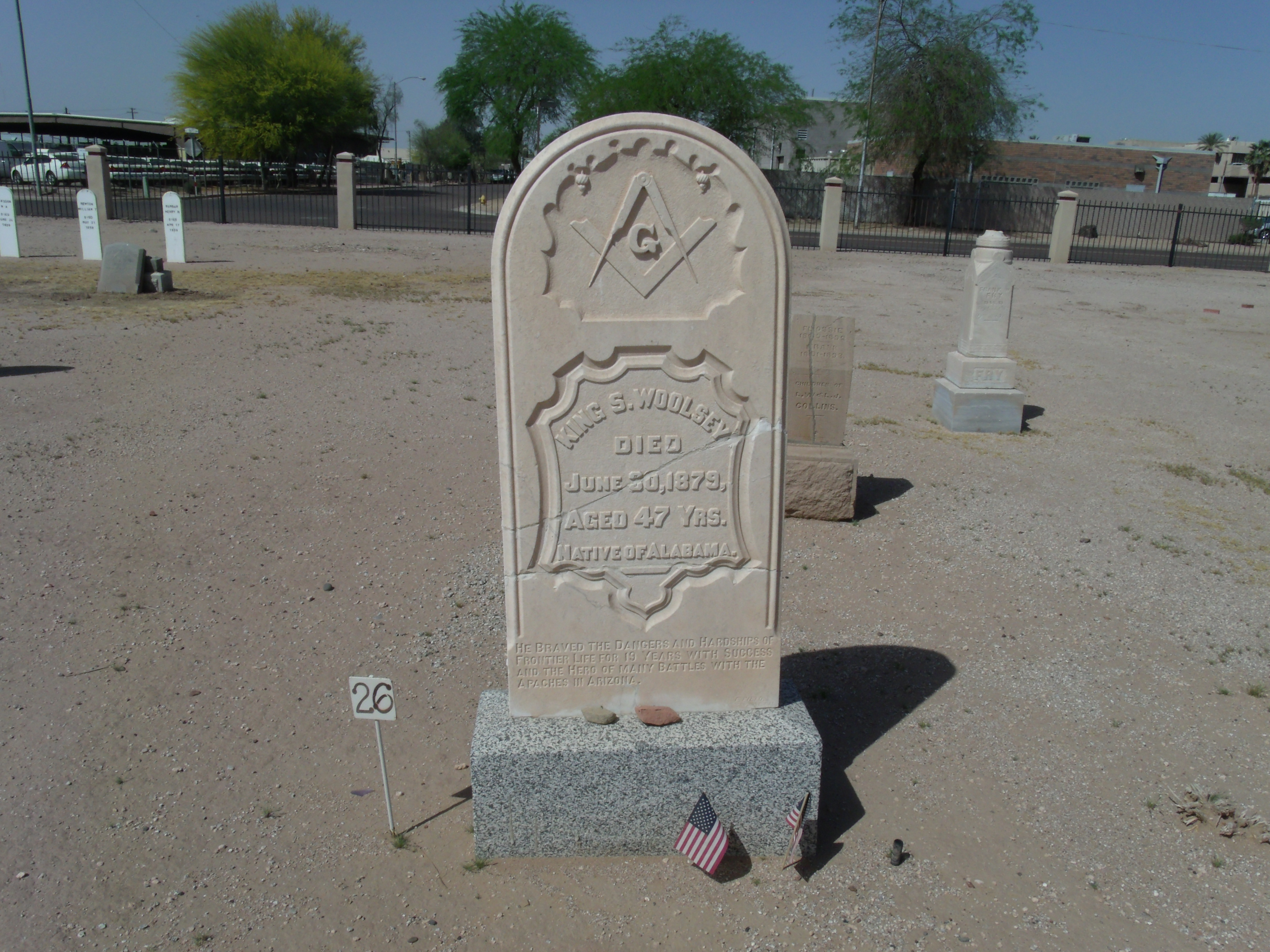
The grave of King S. Woolsey in the "City/Loosley Cemetery" section. Woosley founded one of the first flour mills in the Salt River Valley.

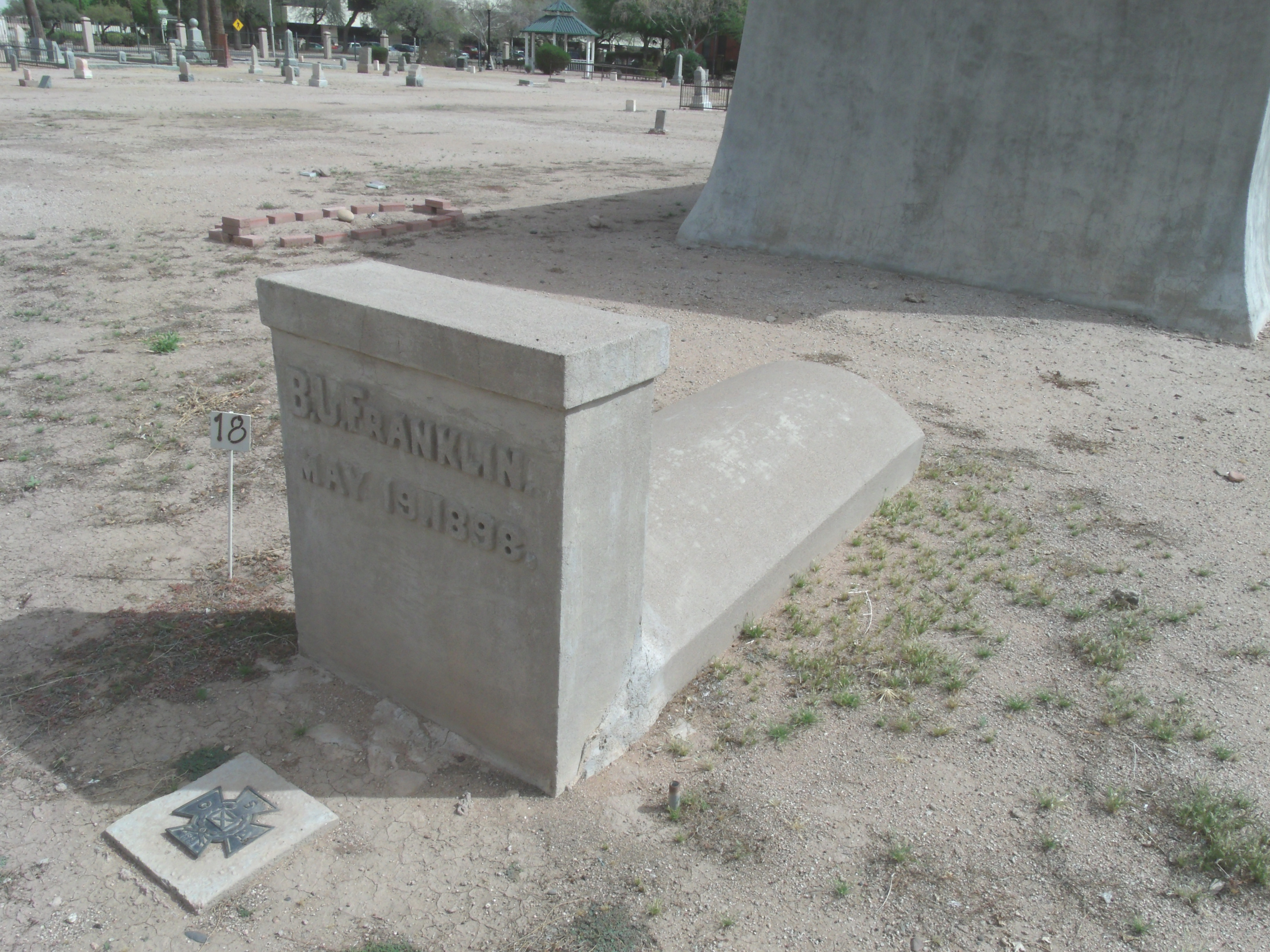
Grave site of Benjamin Joseph Franklin located in the "Rosedale Cemetery" section. Franklin was Arizona's 12th Territorial Governor.

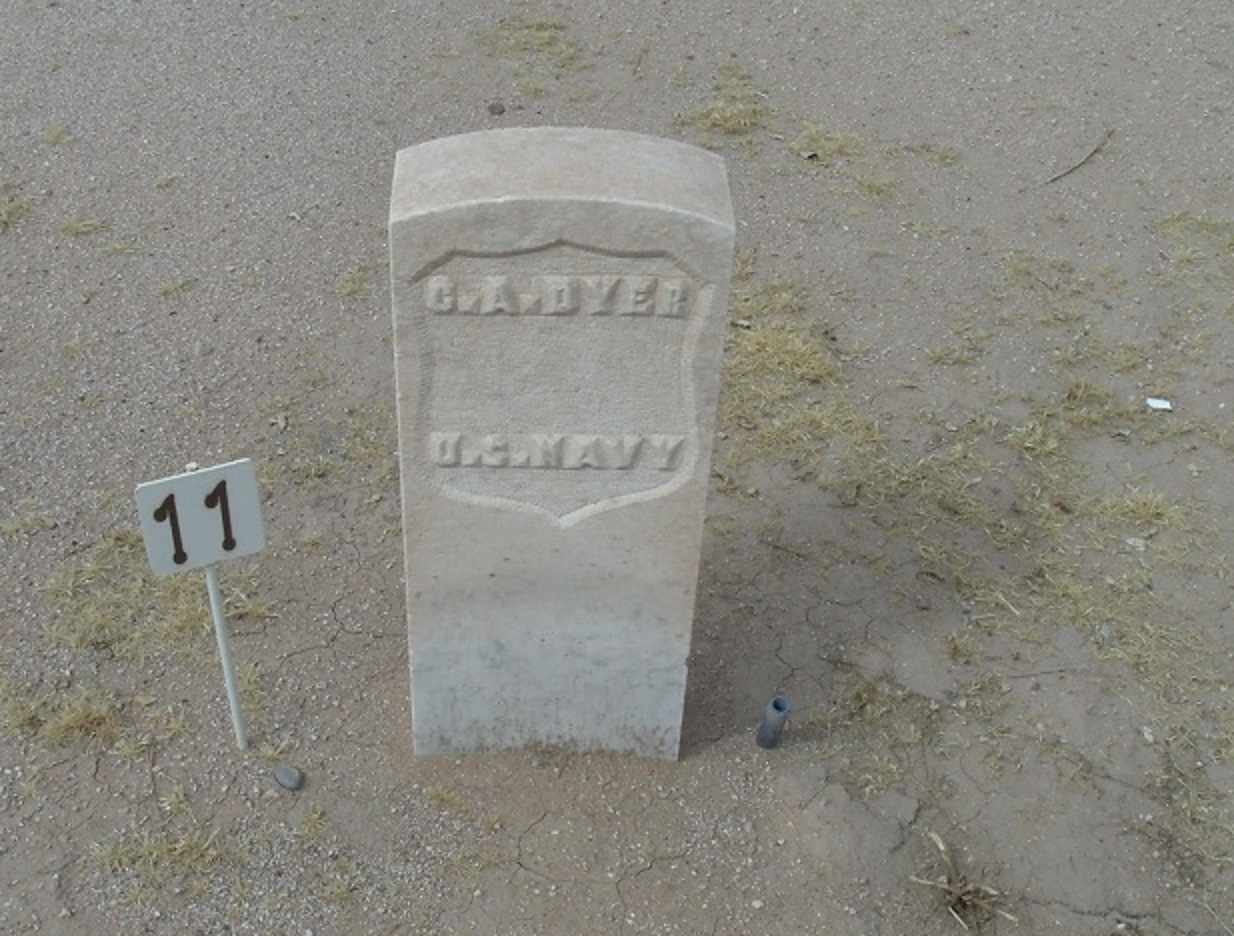
Grave site of Czar J. Dyer located in the "Rosedale Cemetery" section. Dyer once served as City Councilman and in 1899 as the acting Mayor of Phoenix. Dyer drew the "Bird's Eye view of Phoenix" map.

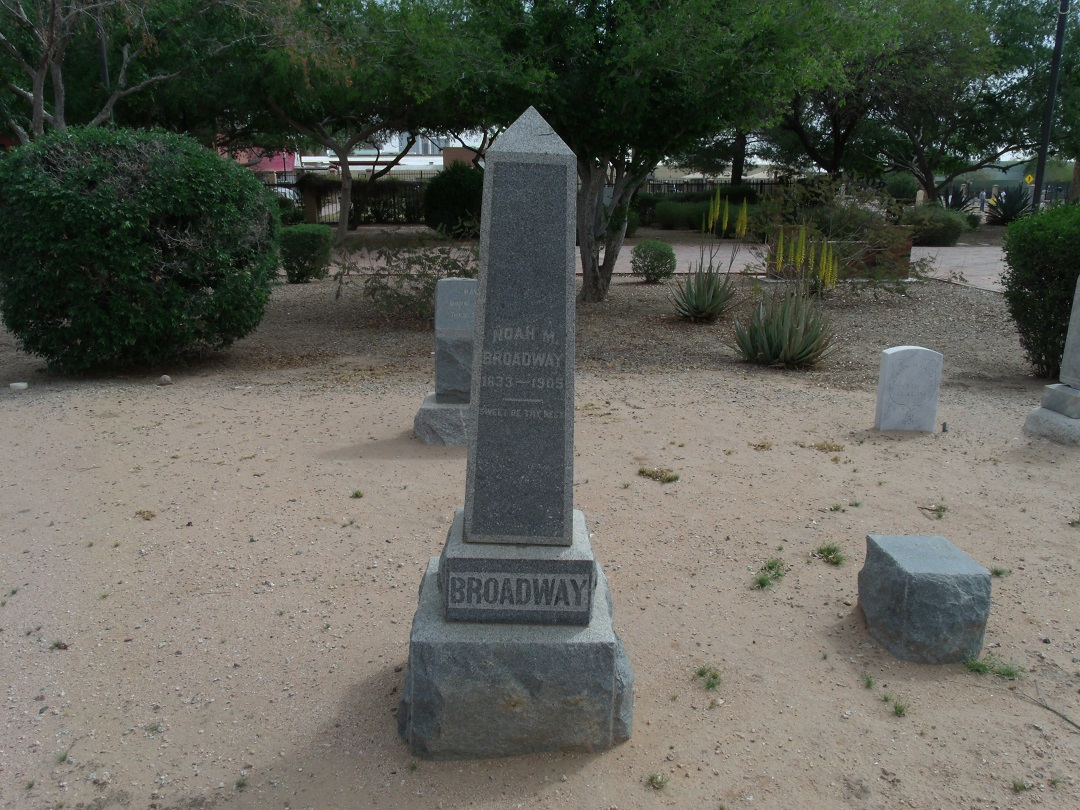
Grave site of Noah M. Broadway located in the "Rosedale Cemetery" section. Broadway was one of the original settlers of Phoenix.

=== St. Francis Catholic Cemetery ===
St. Francis Catholic Cemetery, established in 1897, is one of the oldest in the city. Its inhabitants represent pioneer families, community and business leaders, miners, those who succumbed to tuberculosis, and others who helped write the history of Phoenix and Arizona. Margaret Geare of Dublin, Ireland, who was buried on October 12, 1897, is believed to be the first to be buried in the cemetery. The cemetery is located at 2033 N. 48th Street.

St. Francis Catholic Cemetery

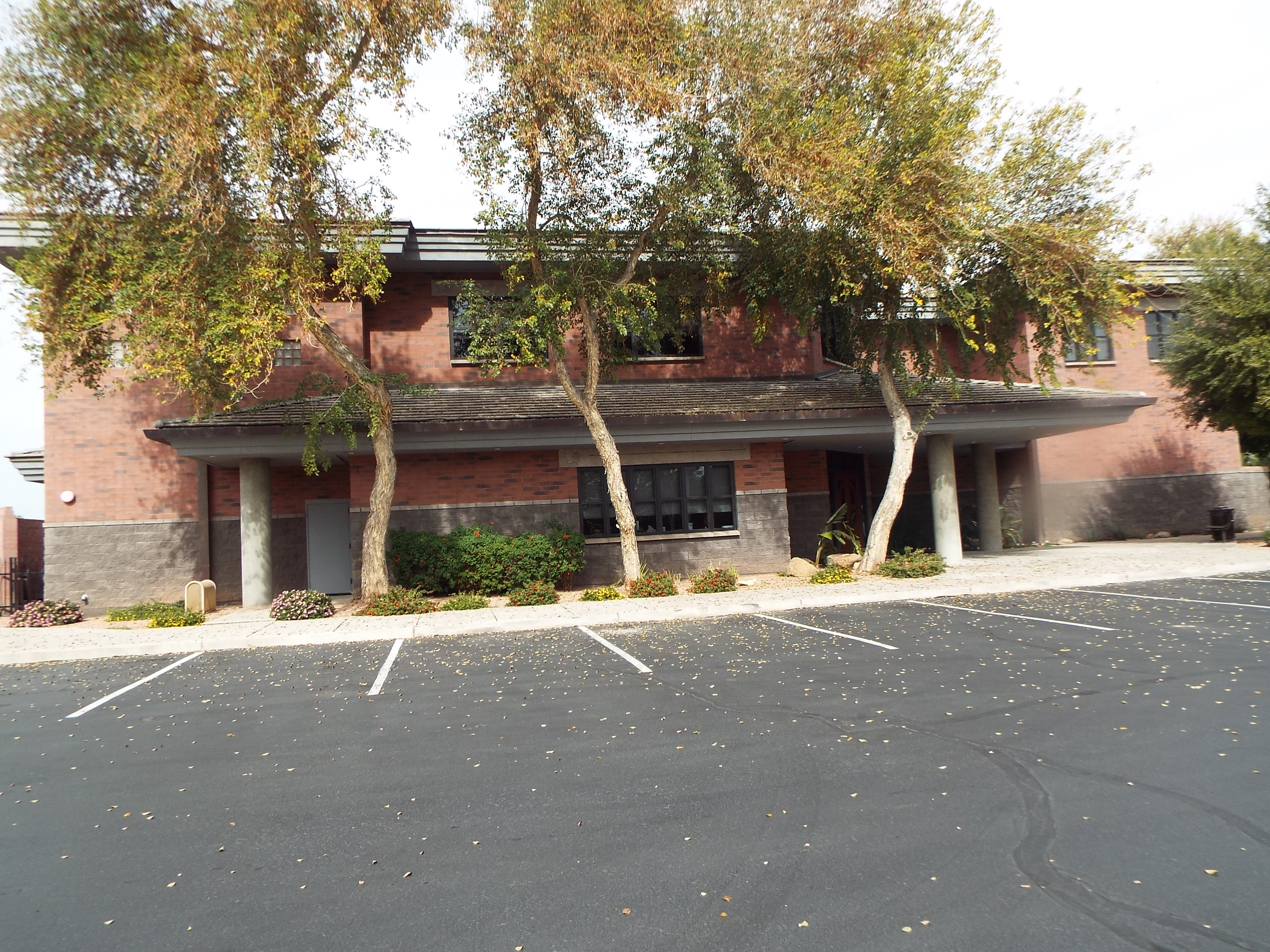
St. Francis Catholic Cemetery

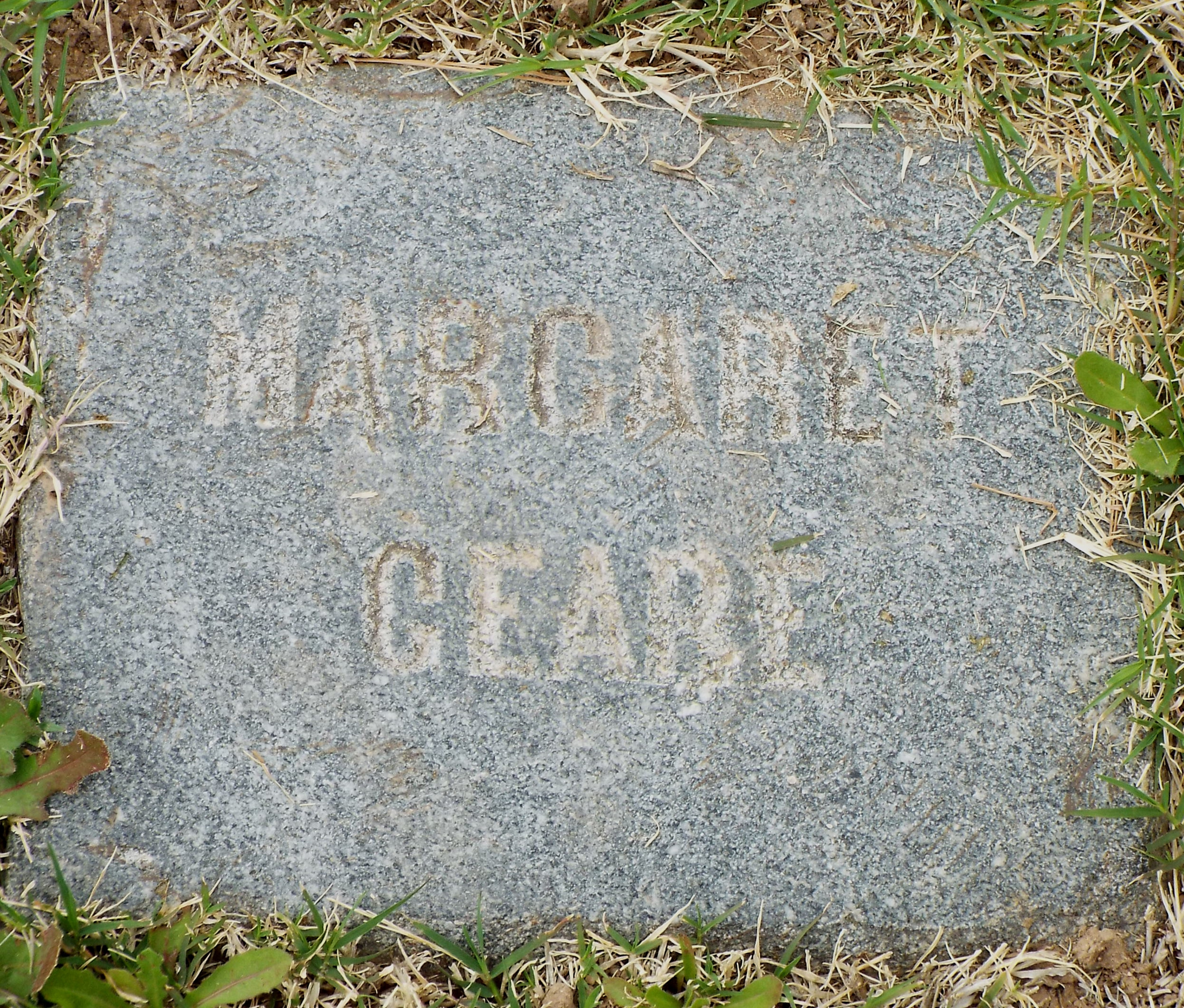
Grave of Margaret Geare (1817–1897), also known as Mary and Marguerite was the first person buried in the cemetery. She was buried on Oct. 12, 1897

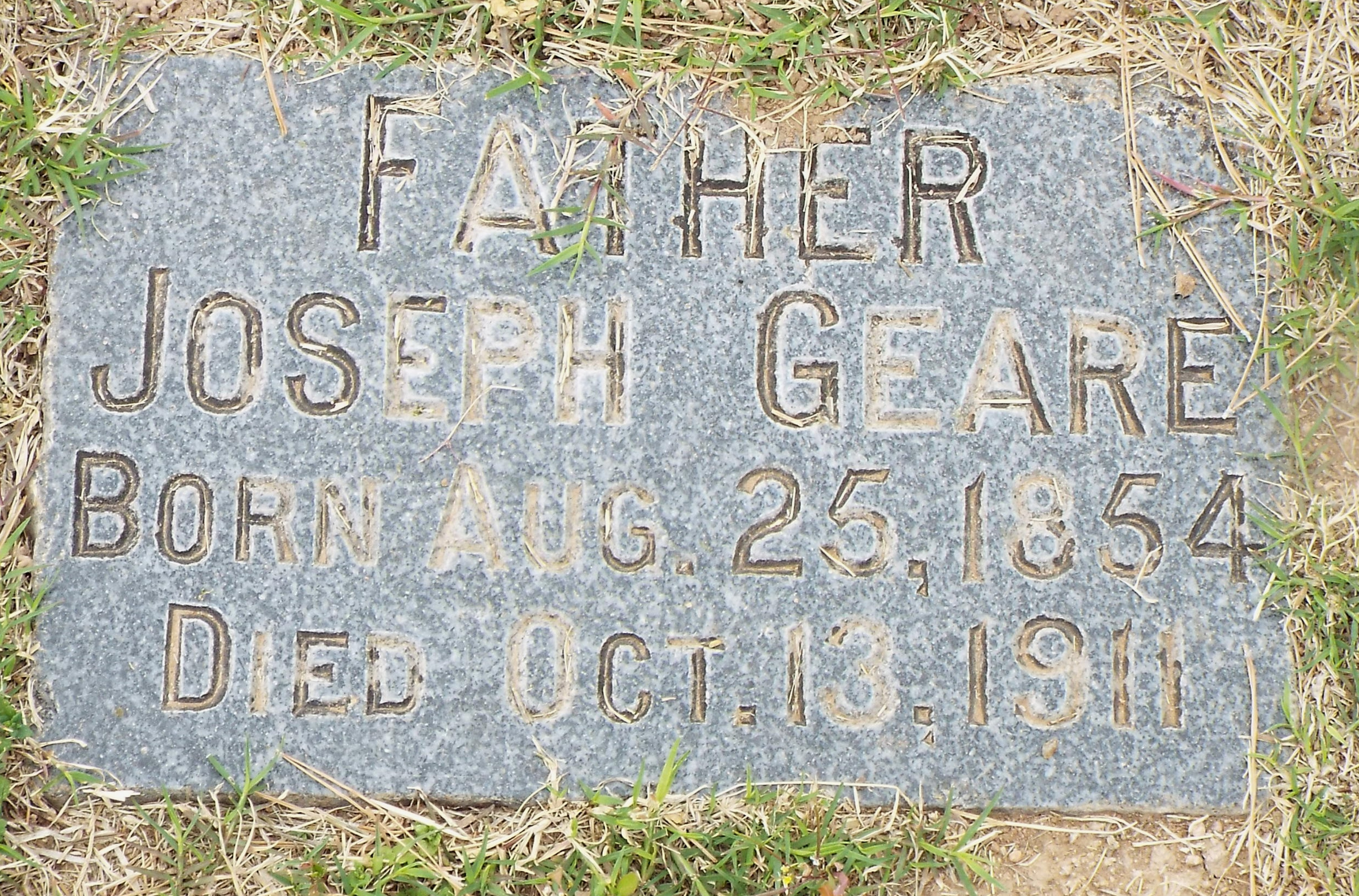
Grave of Joseph Geare (1854–1911), son of Hubert and Margaret who founded the Central Avenue Dairy on the land that is now Park Central Mall.

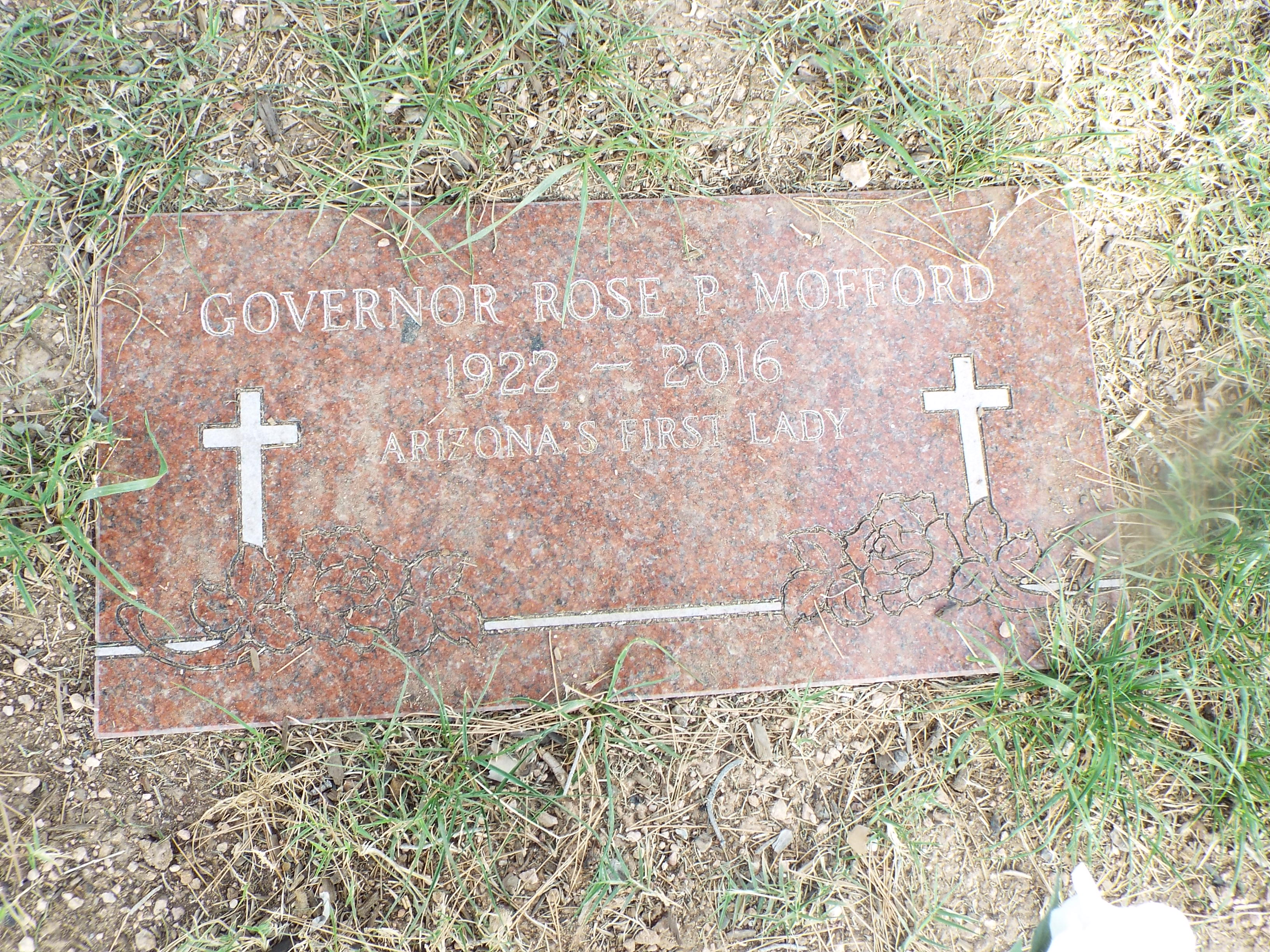
Grave of Governor Rose P. Moffort (1922–2016). Moffort was Arizona's first female Secretary of State (1977–88) and first female and 18th Governor of Arizona (1988–91).

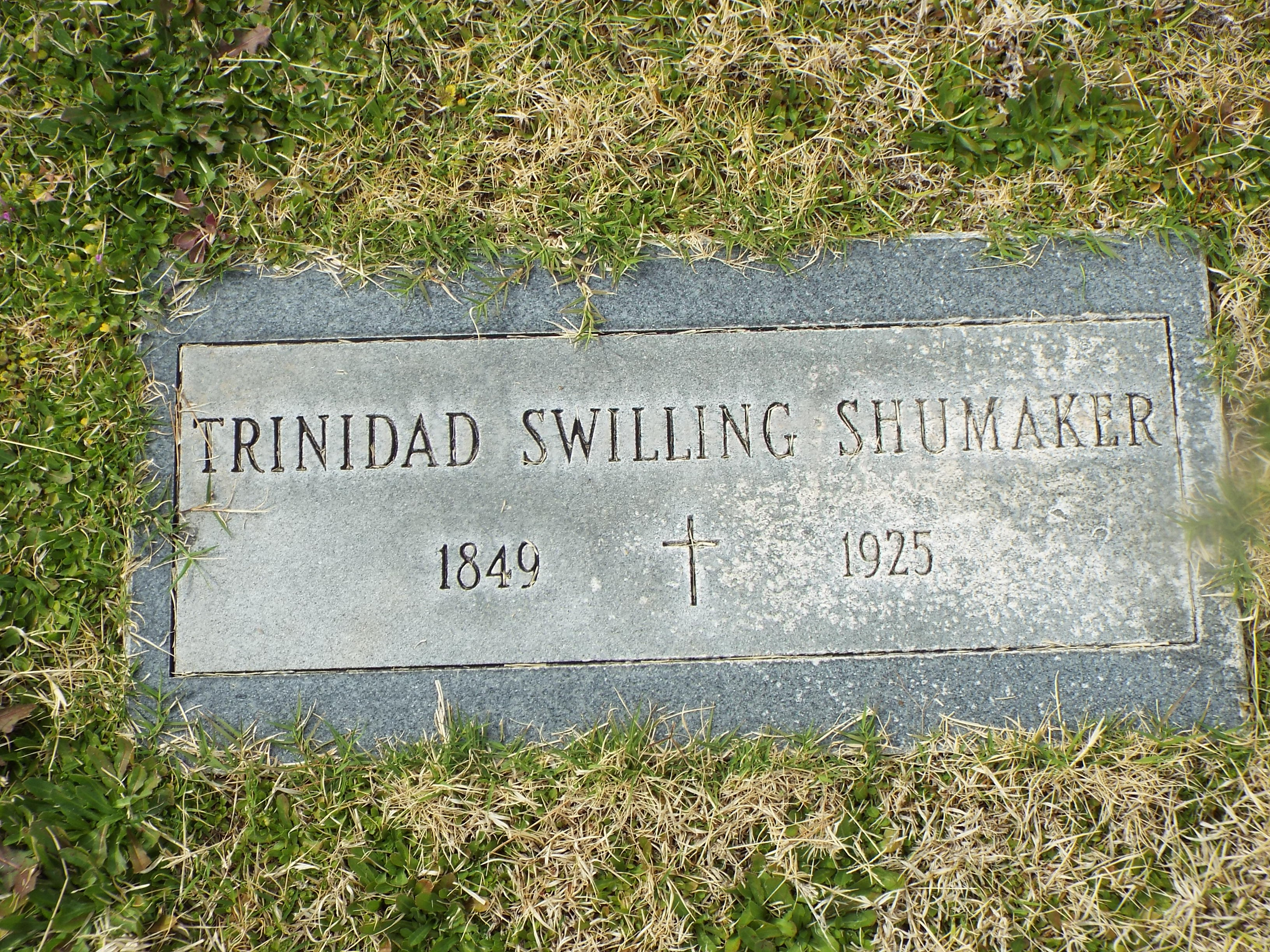
Grave of Trinidad Escalante Swilling Shumaker (1849–1925). Known as the "Mother of Phoenix". Swilling Shumaker was the wife of Jack Swilling, who is credited with being the founding father of Phoenix.

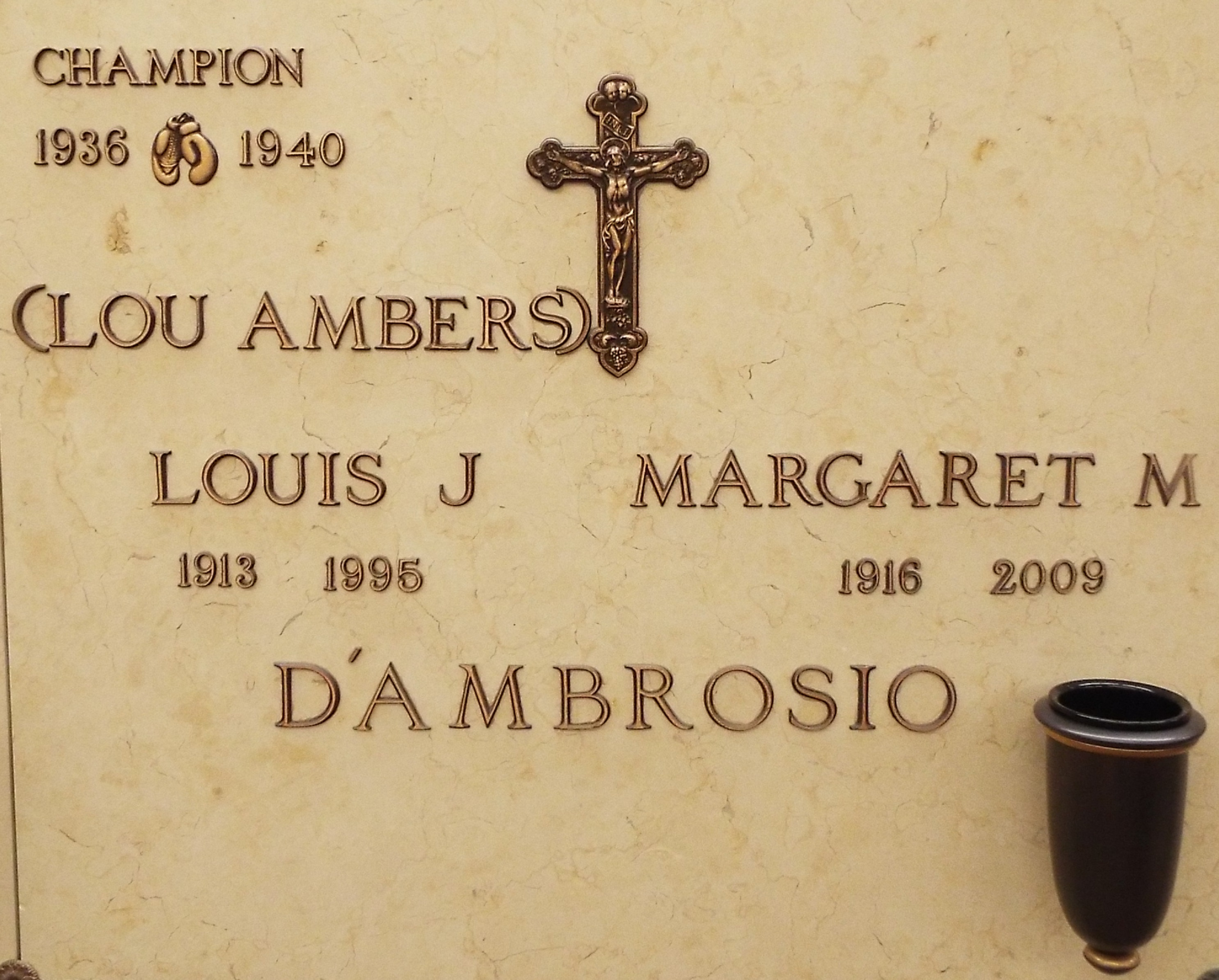
Crypt of Louis J. (Lou Ambers) D’Ambrosio (1913–1995) and his wife Margaret M. D’Ambrosio (1916–2009). Ambers, was a World lightweight boxing champion from 1936 to 1940.

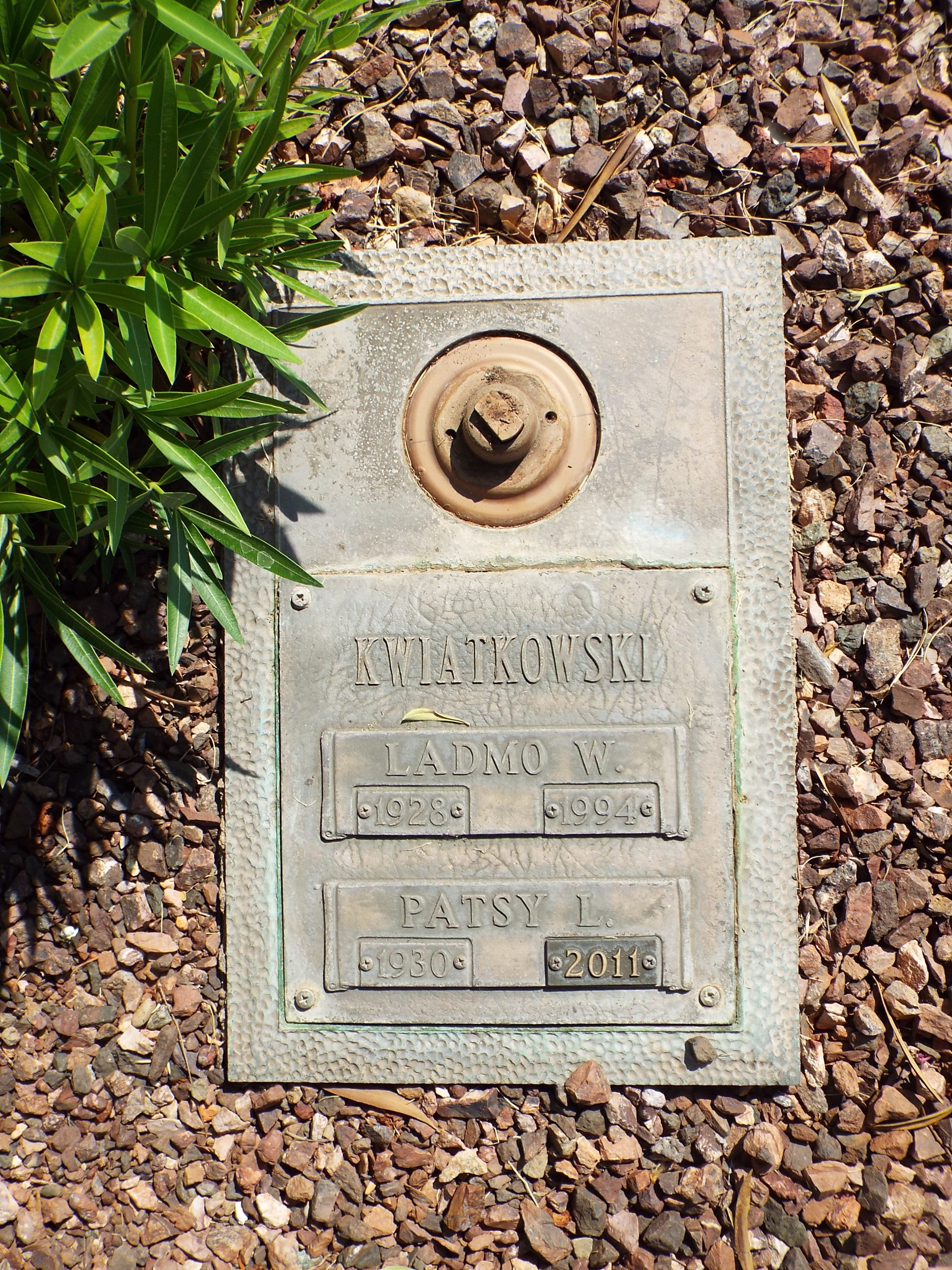
Grave of Ladimir Kwiatkowski (1928–1994), better known as Ladmo, Kwiatkowski co-hosted The Wallace and Ladmo Show, a daily children's variety show broadcast on KPHO in Phoenix, Arizona.

=== Greenwood/Memory Lawn Mortuary & Cemetery ===
Greenwood/Memory Lawn Mortuary & Cemetery is the final resting place of various notable people. Among them are three Arizona Territory Governors, six Arizona State Governors, a Secretary of Arizona Territory, the founder of Glendale, Arizona, the 1958 Indianapolis 500 winner and a journalist.

Historic Greenwood/Memory Lawn Mortuary & Cemetery

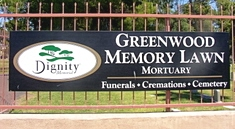
Established in 1906.

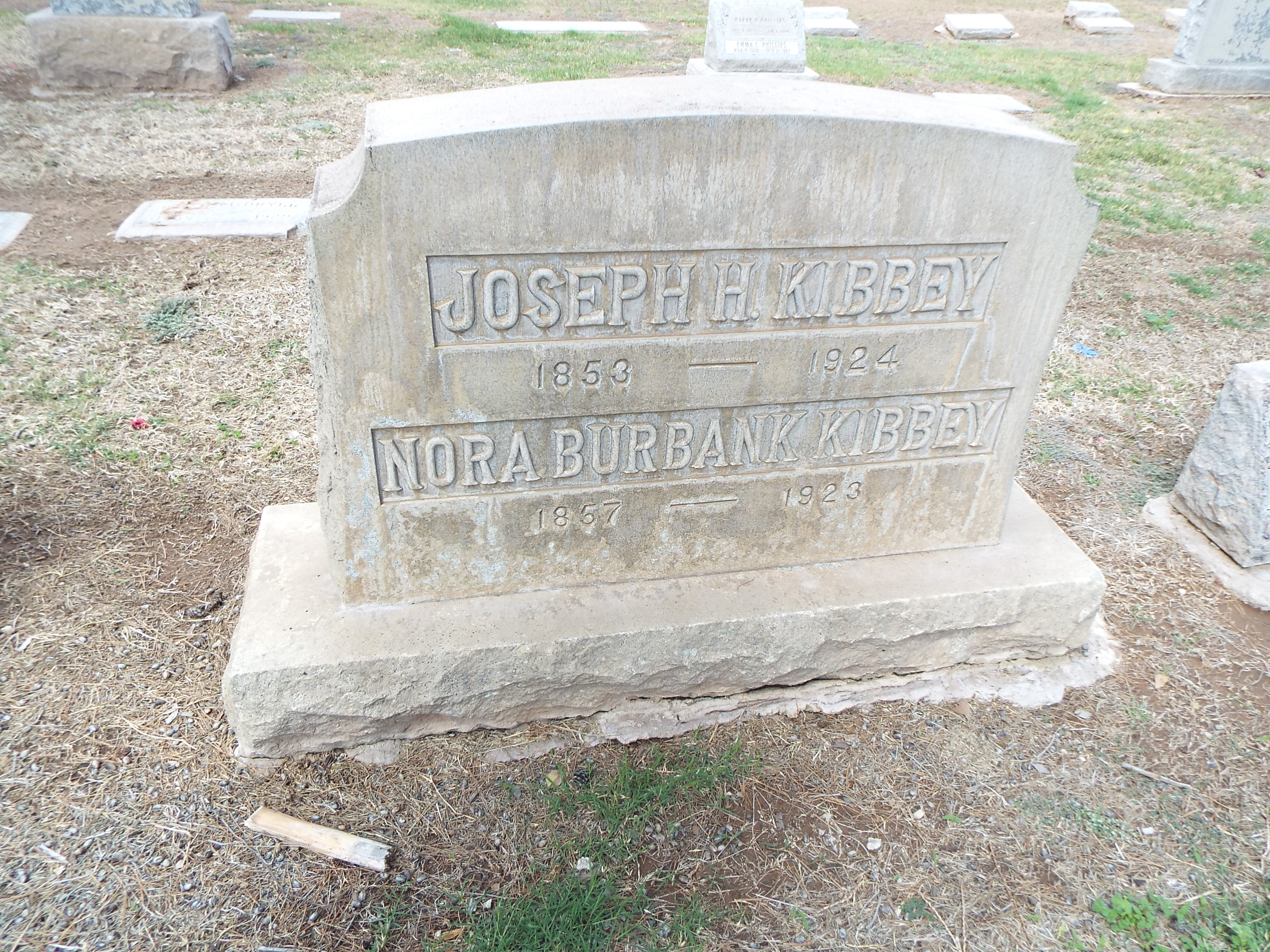
Grave-site of Joseph H. Kibbey (1853–1924) and Nora Burbank Kibbey (1867–1923). J. H. Kibbey served as Associate Justice of the Arizona Territorial Supreme Court from 1889 to 1893 and as the 16th Governor of Arizona Territory from 1905 to 1909. As governor, Kibbey was a leader in the effort to prevent Arizona and New Mexico territories from being combined into a single U.S. state.

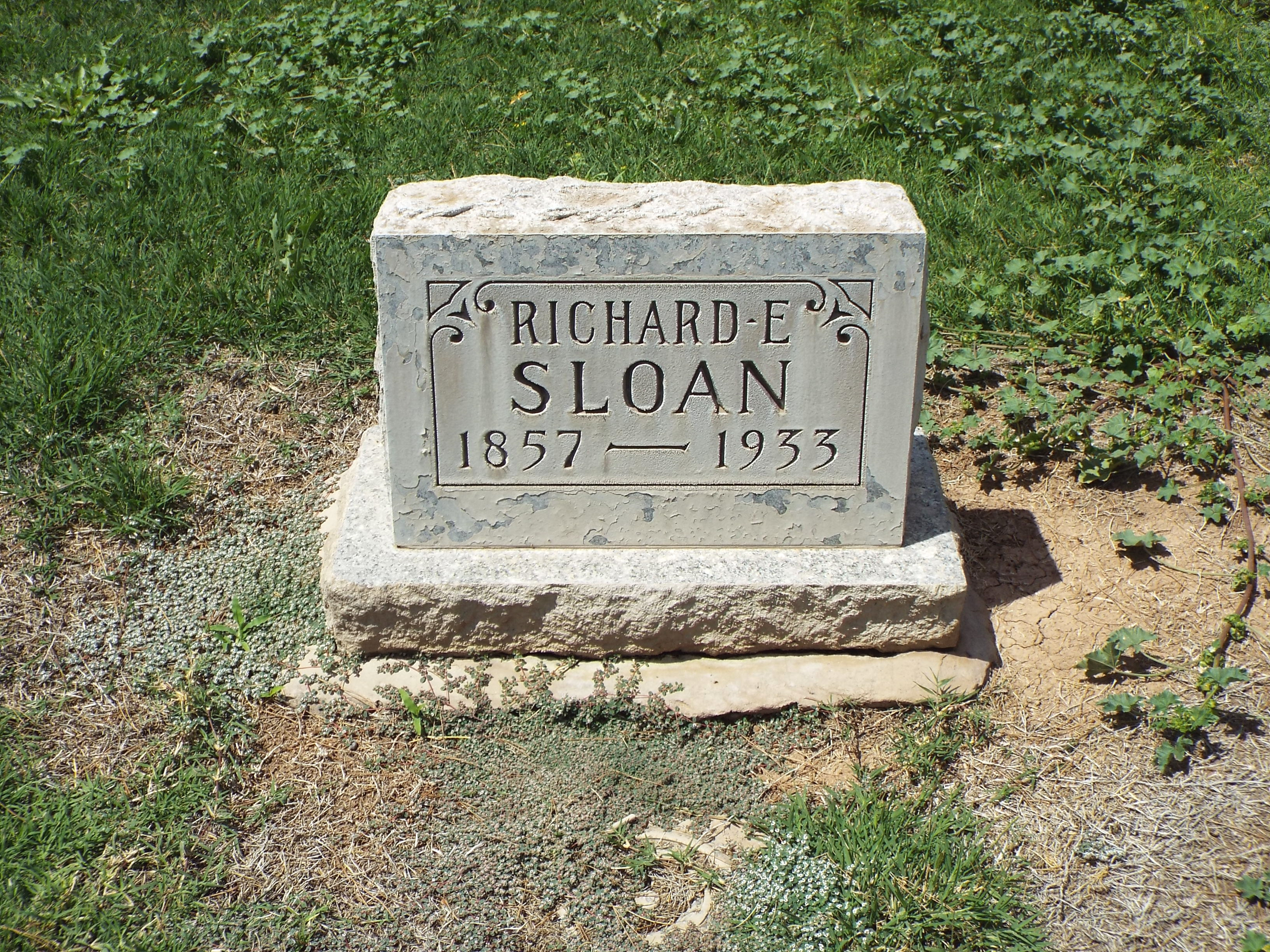
Grave-sight of Richard Elihu Sloan (1857–1933), the 17th and last Governor Arizona Territory. He served from 1909 to 1912.

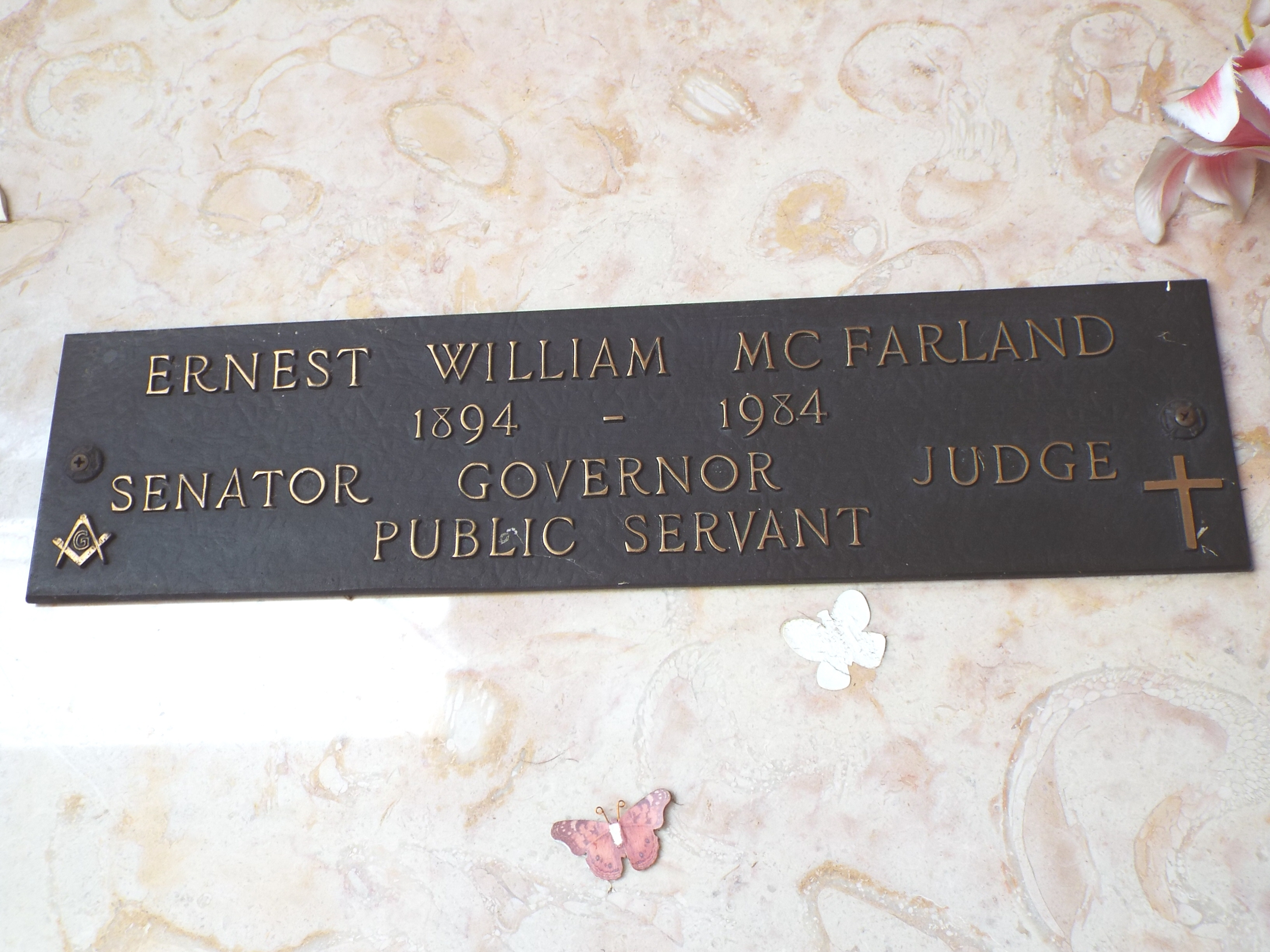
Crypt of Ernest William McFarland (1894–1984). McFaland served as U.S. Senator (1941–1953), the tenth Governor of Arizona (1955–59) and Arizona Supreme Court Justice (1968).

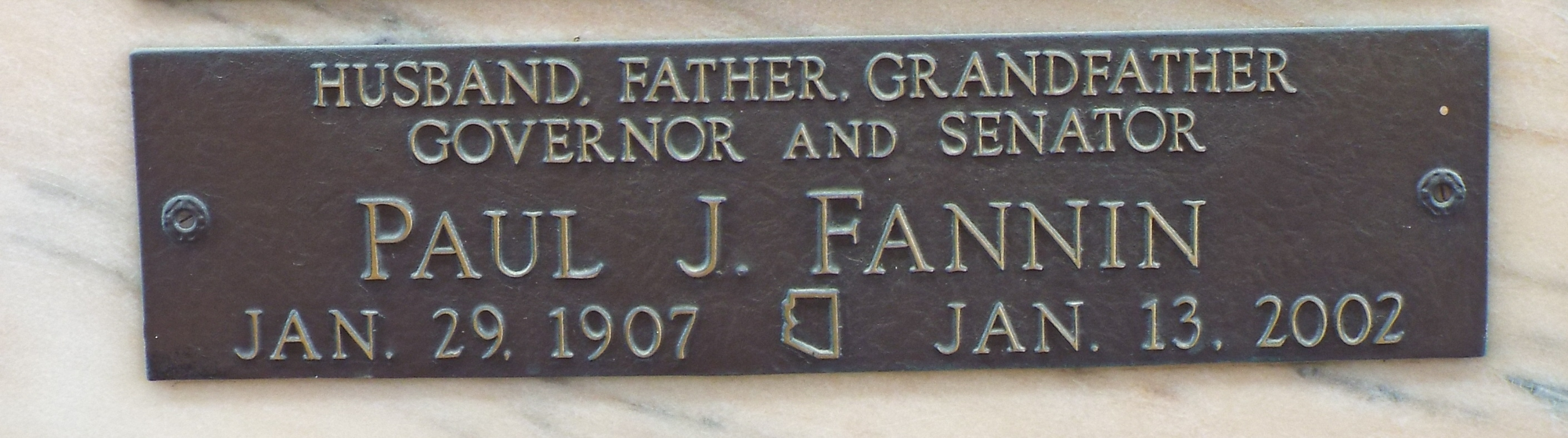
Crypt of Paul Jones Fannin (1907–2002). Fannin served as U.S. Senator (1965–77) and as the 11th Governor of Arizona from 1959–65.

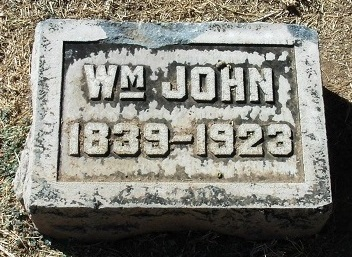
Grave-site of William John Murphy (1839–1923), founder of Glendale, Arizona.

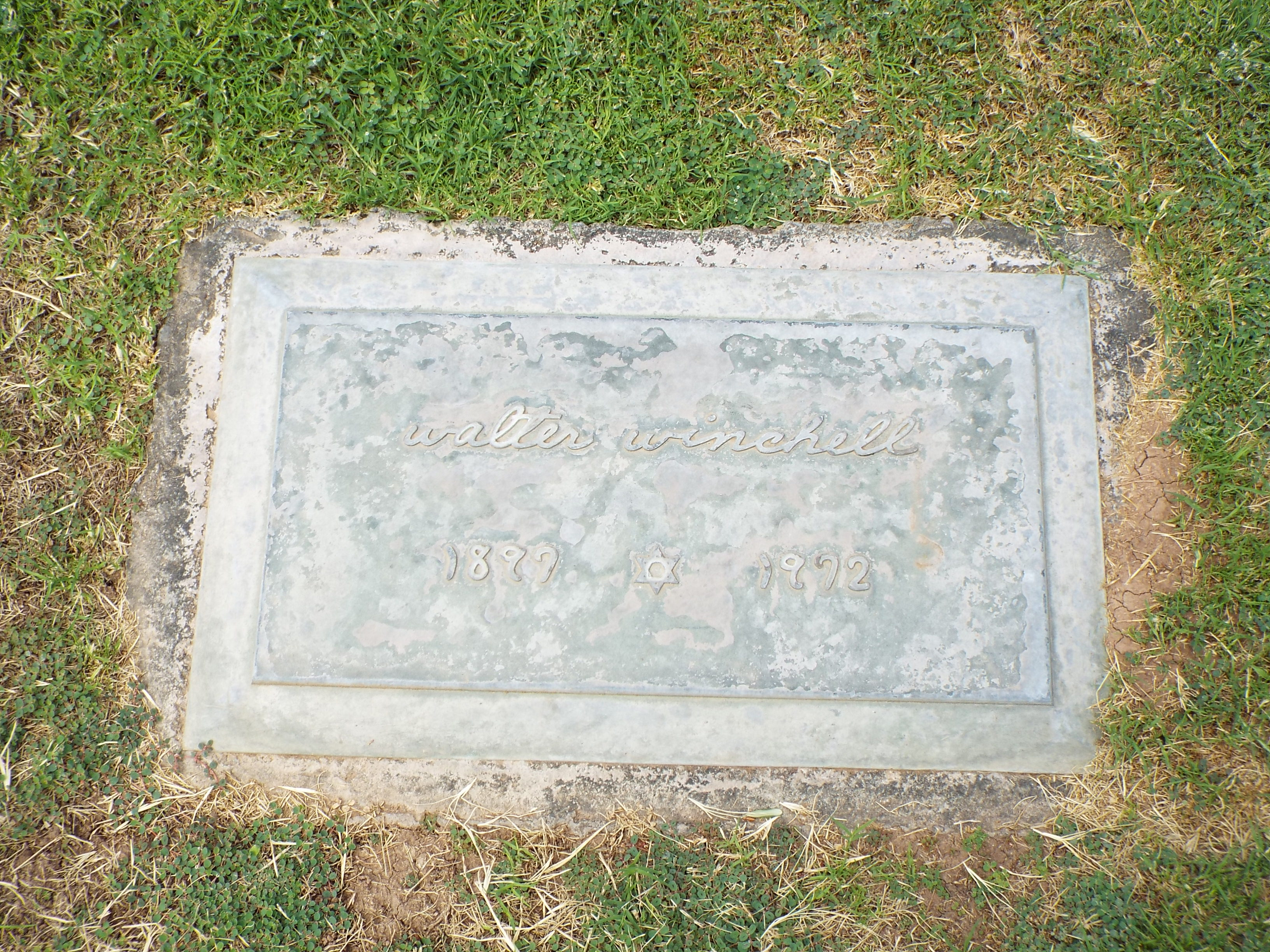
Grave site of Walter Winchell (1897–1972). Winchell was a newspaper columnist who is credited with inventing the gossip column.

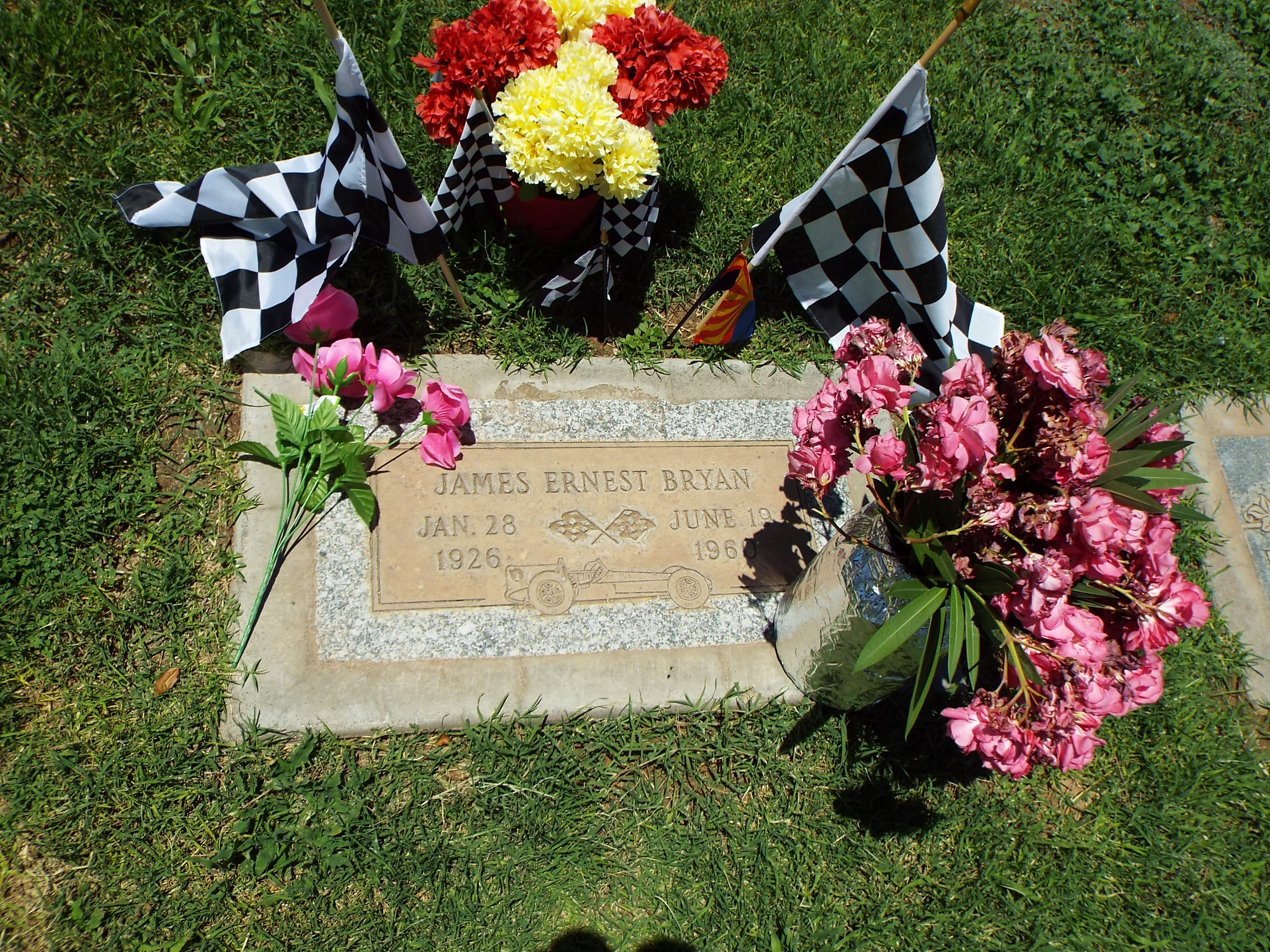
Grave site of James Ernest Bryan (1926–1960). Bryan was a racecar driver who won the 1958 Indianapolis 500.

== Historic structures related to "The Trunk Murderess" ==
External videos
- You can watch and listen to a 2007 documentary about Winnie Ruth Judd titled Winnie Ruth Judd – Arizona Stories Full Version here

Winnie Ruth Judd was a native of Indiana who worked in Phoenix as a medical secretary. Judd was accused of murdering and dismembering the bodies of her two roommates, friends Agnes Anne LeRoi and Hedvig Samuelson. The prosecutors in her trial alleged that she placed the dismembered parts of the bodies in two trunks (suitcases) and took them to Los Angeles. According to prosecutors, the murders were committed by Judd and an accomplice, Phoenix businessman John "Happy Jack" Halloran, whom she claimed was her lover. Her trial was marked by sensationalized nationwide newspaper coverage, who referred to Judd as "The Trunk Murderess". She was pronounced guilty and sentenced to death by hanging. The sentence she received raised debate about capital punishment. Days before her execution Winnie Ruth was called back to the courtroom for an insanity hearing. In 1933, she was found to be insane and moved from prison to the Arizona State Mental Hospital.

The historic properties pictured are all either directly or indirectly related to Judd and the infamous crime. Three of the buildings are listed in the National Register of Historic Places, two of the houses are located in the Historic Roosevelt District which is listed in the National Register of Historic Places and the house where the murders took place was once listed in the "enDangered Dozen Historic Places List," released by the Phoenix Historic Neighborhoods Coalition. It is now in the process of restoration and will be used to house a law firm.

Historic structures related to Winnie Ruth Judd "The Trunk Murderess"
(NRHP = National Register of Historic Places)
(PHPR = Phoenix Historic Property Register)
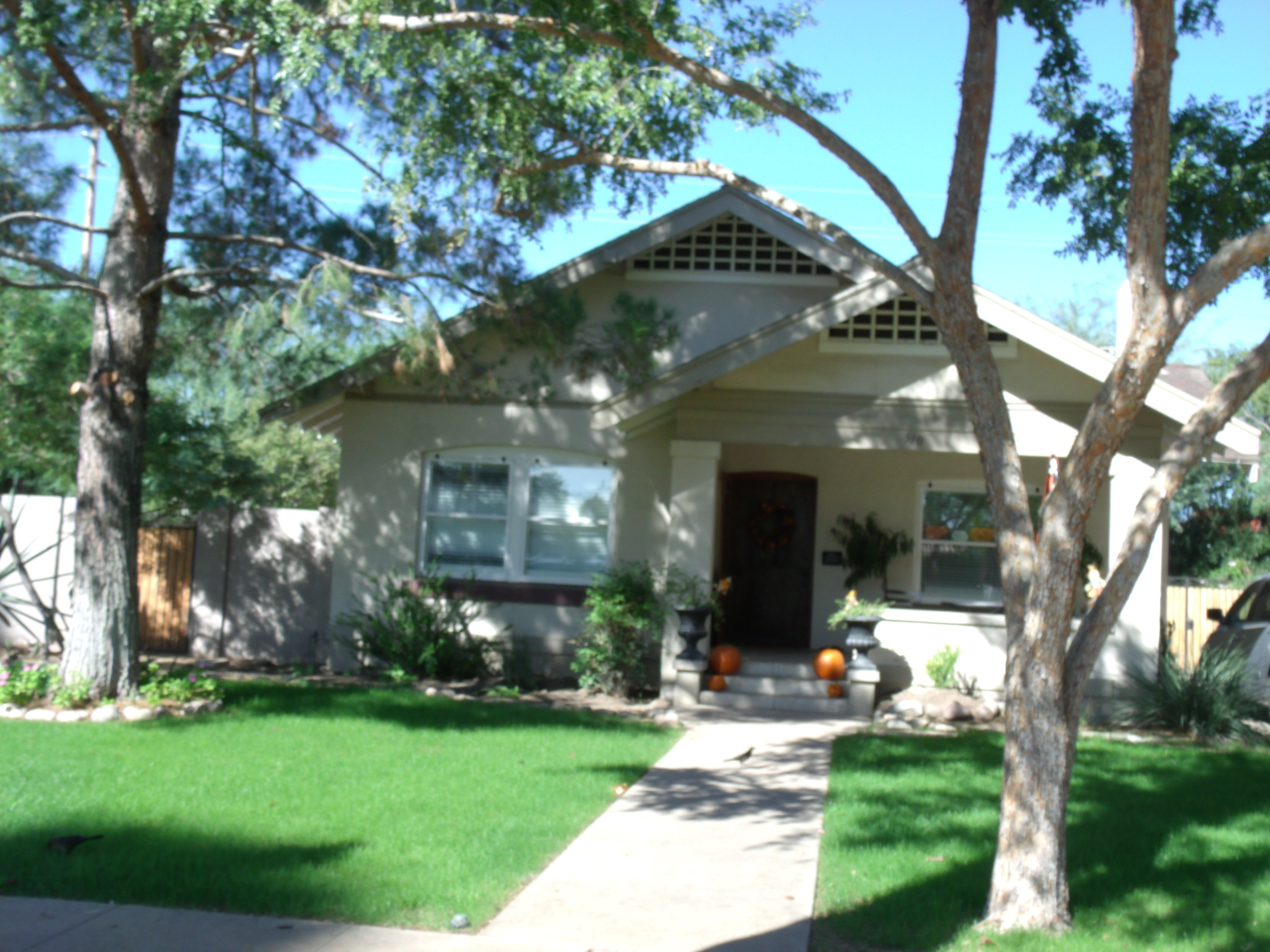
The Leigh's Ford House was built in 1926 and is located at 510 W. Lynwood St. This is the house where the infamous Winnie Ruth Judd, known as "The truck Murderess", lived and first met her lover and alleged accomplice in crime Jack Halloran. The house is located in the Historic Roosevelt District of Phoenix which was listed in 1983 in the National Register of Historic Places, reference #83003490.

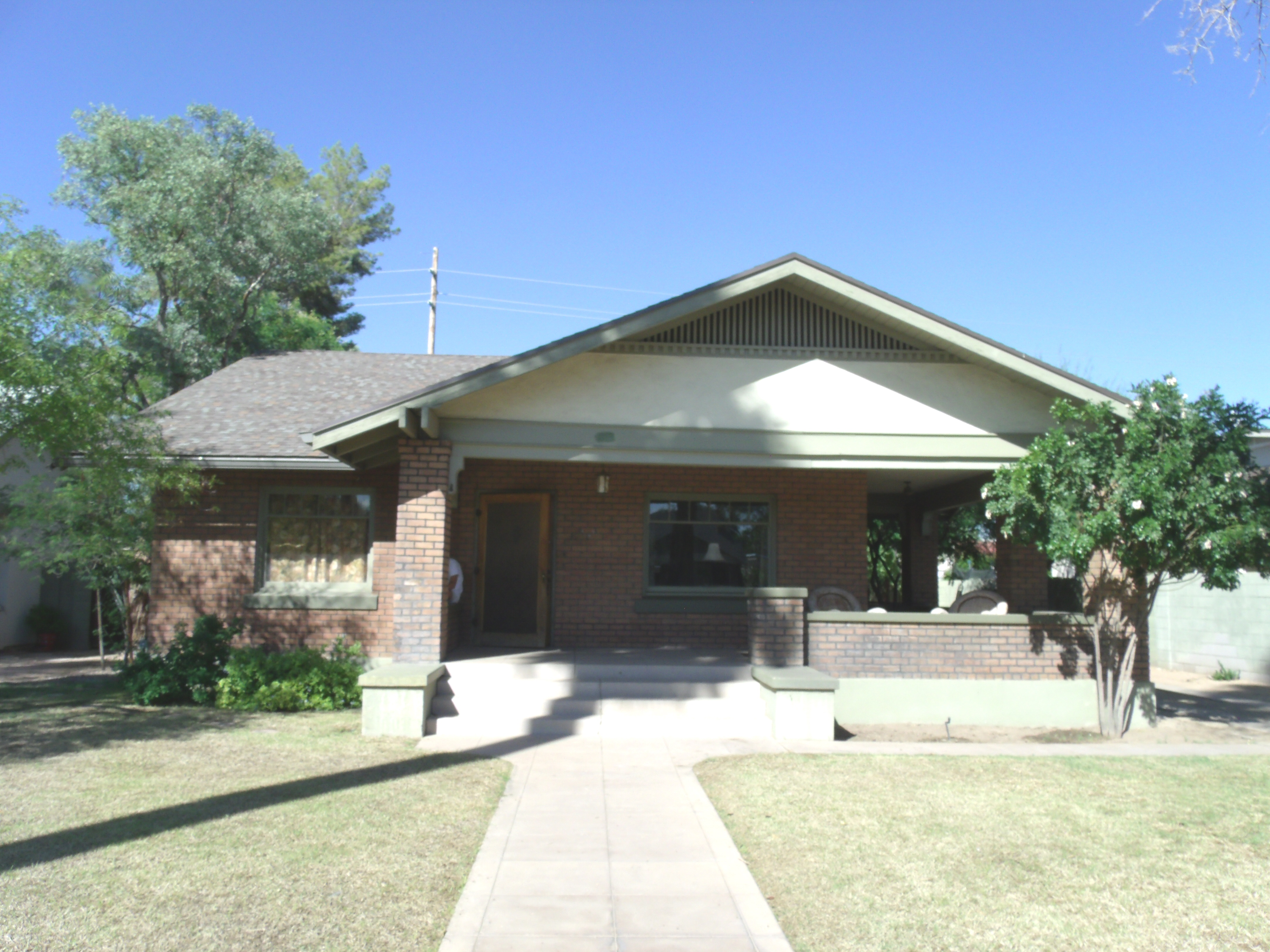
The Jack Halloran House was built in 1920 and is located at 514 W. Lynwood St. This where Jack Halloran, the lover and alleged accomplice of Winnie Ruth Judd, also known as "The Trunk Murderess" lived. The house is located in the Historic Roosevelt District of Phoenix which in 1983 was listed in the National Register of Historic Places, reference #83003490.

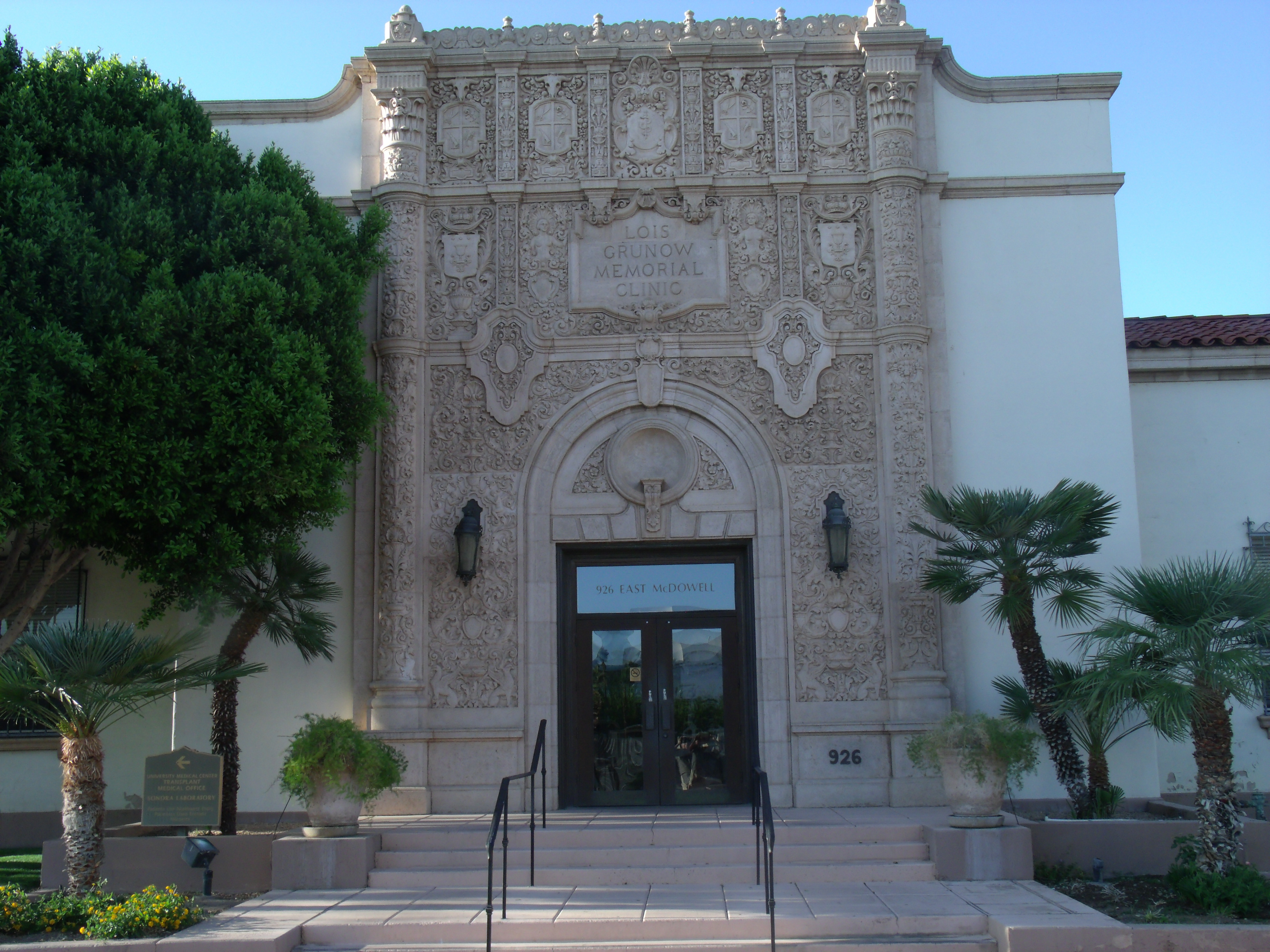
Entrance of the Lois Grunow Memorial Clinic, built in 1931 and located at 926 E. McDowell Rd. This is where Winnie Ruth Judd worked. Here she became acquainted with the two girls who became her roommates and whom she murdered. On September 4, 1985, the property was listed in the National Register of Historic Places, reference #85002065.

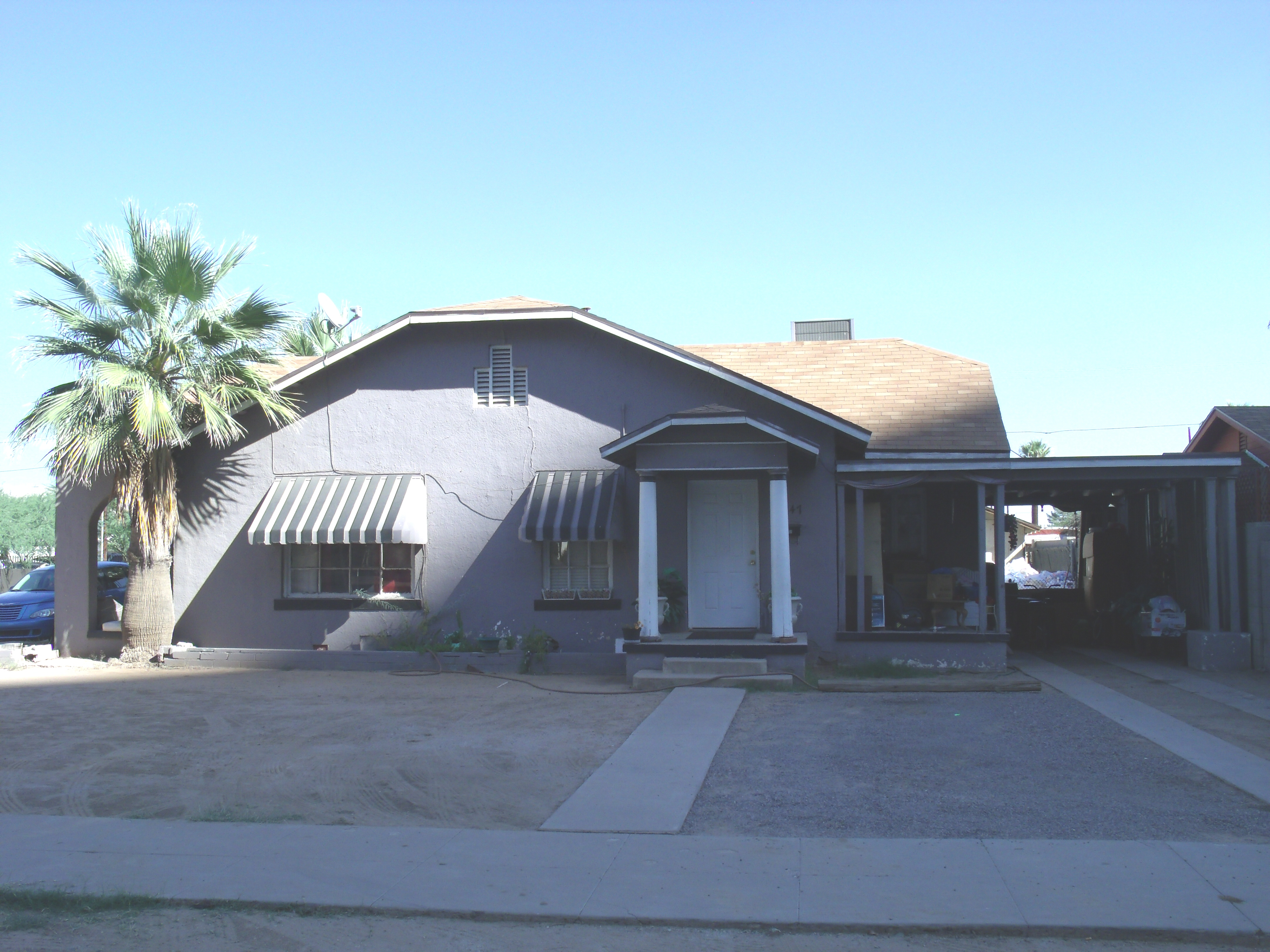
The "Winnie Ruth Judd House" was built in the 1920s and is located at 2947 N. 2nd Street. This house, which was rented by Winnie Ruth Judd, is where she murdered and dismembered her two roommates, Agnes Anne LeRoi and Hedvig Samuelson, on the night of October 16, 1931.

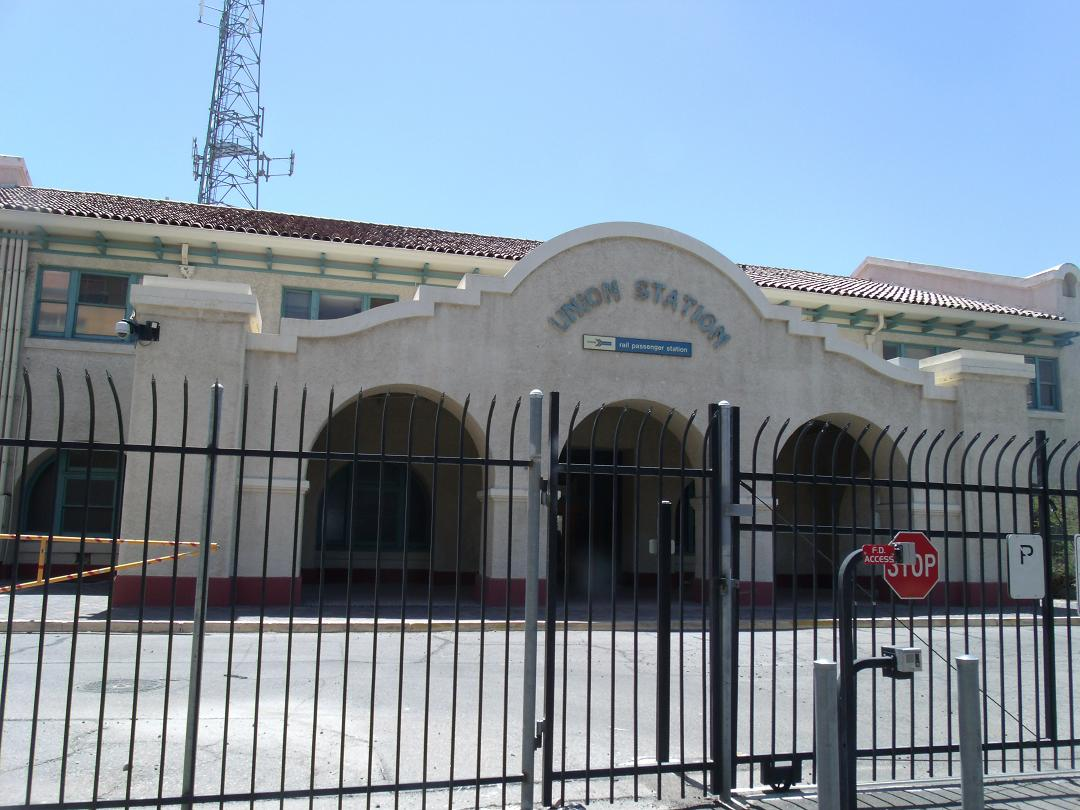
The Phoenix Union Station was built in 1923 and is located at Fourth Avenue and Southern Pacific RR tracks. Winnie Ruth Judd boarded the train heading to Los Angeles with the two trunks containing the dismembered bodies of her two roommates in this station. The station was added to the National Register of Historic Places in 1985. Reference number 85003056

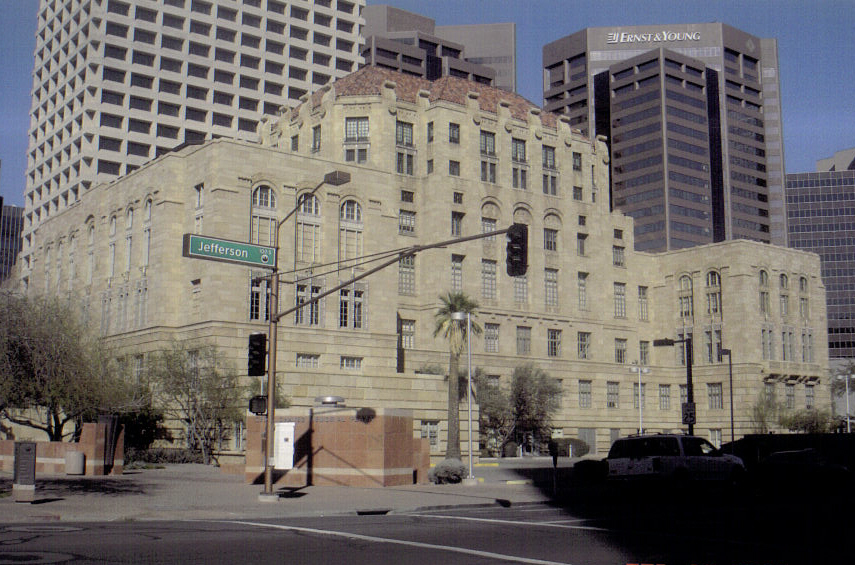
The Maricopa County Courthouse where Judd was imprisoned and her trail held. The historical structure, which was built in 1928, is listed in the National Register of Historic Places.

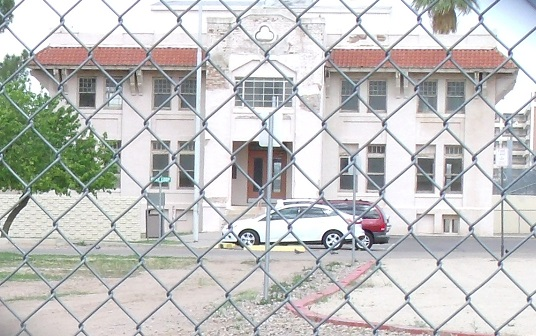
The Arizona State Hospital Building, also known as Mahoney Administration Building, was built in 1900 and is located at 2500 E. Van Buren St. Winnie Ruth Judd was committed here on April 24, 1933. The building was listed in the National Register of Historic Places on July 15, 2009, reference #09000510.

== Landmarks ==
Among the landmarks that are pictured and included in this article are the Deer Valley Rock Art Center and Papago Park. The Deer Valley Rock Art Center, also known as the Hedgpeth Hills Petroglyph Site and the Sonoran Desert preserve, is a 47-acre archaeological site containing over 1500 Hohokam, Patayan, and Archaic petroglyphs. The petroglyphs are between 500 and 7,000 years old, and at least one source dates the petroglyphs to 10,000 years ago. The site was listed on the National Register of Historic Places in 1984, and it was also listed with the Phoenix Points of Pride. A museum designed by Will Bruder was constructed on the site in 1994.

Papago Park is a hilly desert park covering 1200 acres in its Phoenix extent and 296 acres in its Tempe extent. It is where the Desert Botanical Garden, the Phoenix Zoo, and Hunt's Tomb, the pyramidal tomb of Arizona's first governor, George W. P. Hunt are located.

=== Deer Valley Rock Art Center(Hedgpeth Hills Petroglyph Site) ===
Historic Deer Valley Rock Art Center
(Hohokam Puebloans Petroglyphs and other items)
Listed in the National Register of Historic Places and
as a "Phoenix Points of Pride".
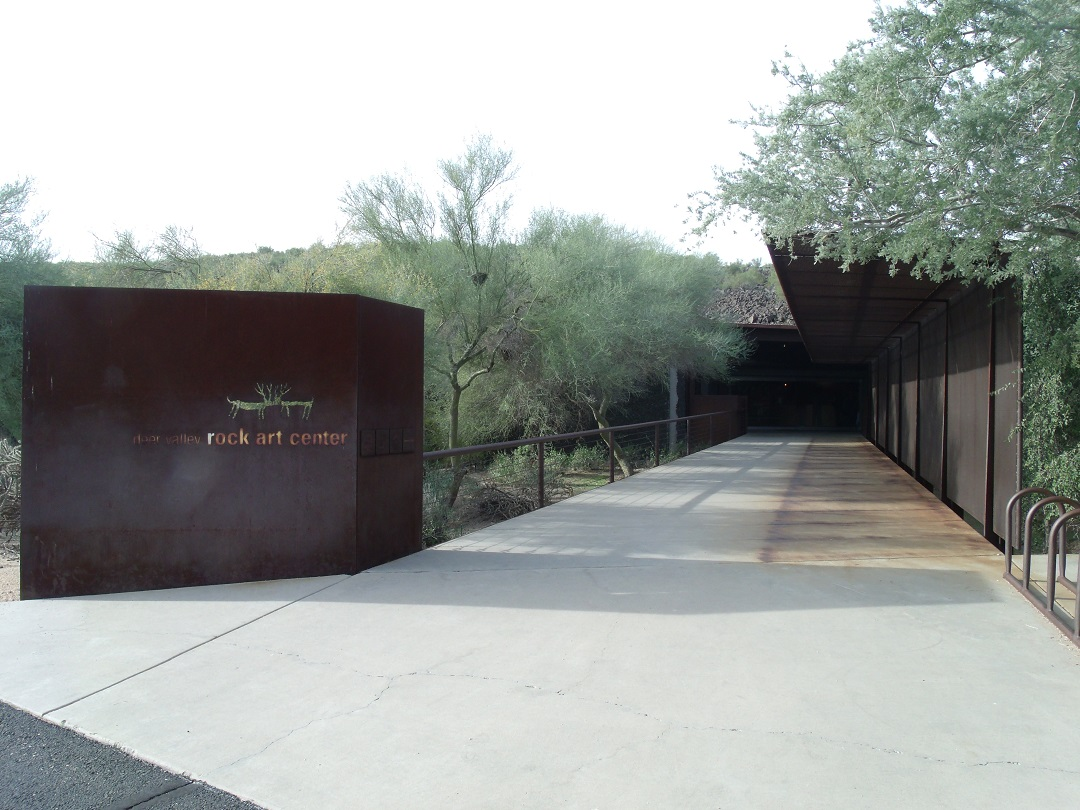
Entrance of the Deer Valley Rock Art Center Museum. Deer Valley Rock Art Center is located in North Phoenix at 3711 W. Deer Valley Road. The site was listed on the National Register of Historic Places on February 16, 1984 and on the Phoenix Points of Pride. National Register of Historic Places ref: 84000718

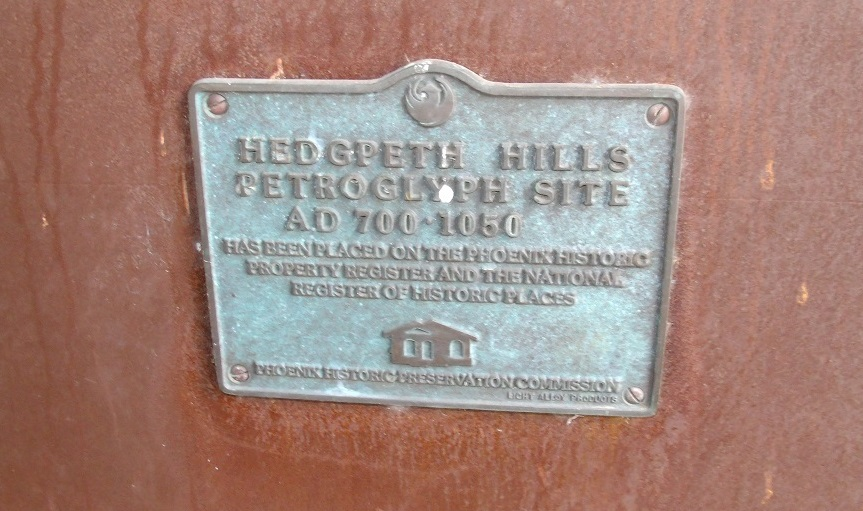
National Register of Historic Places Marker of the Deer Valley Rock Art Center.

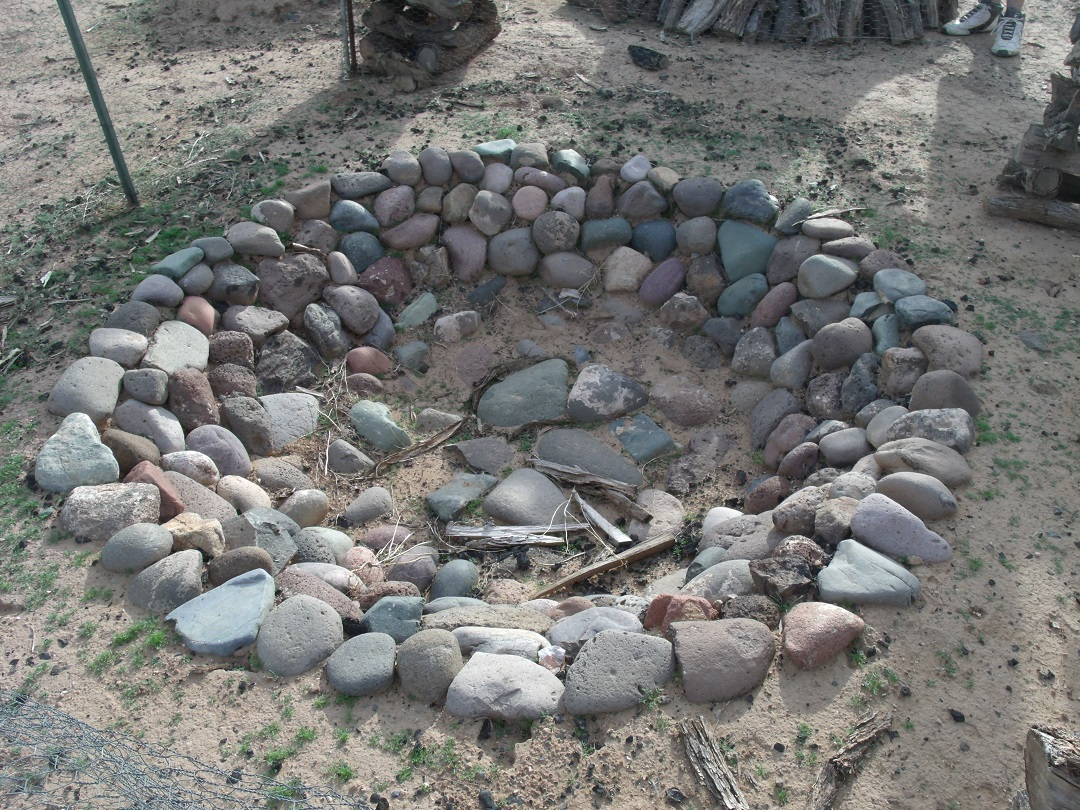
A prehistoric Hohokam cooking pit.

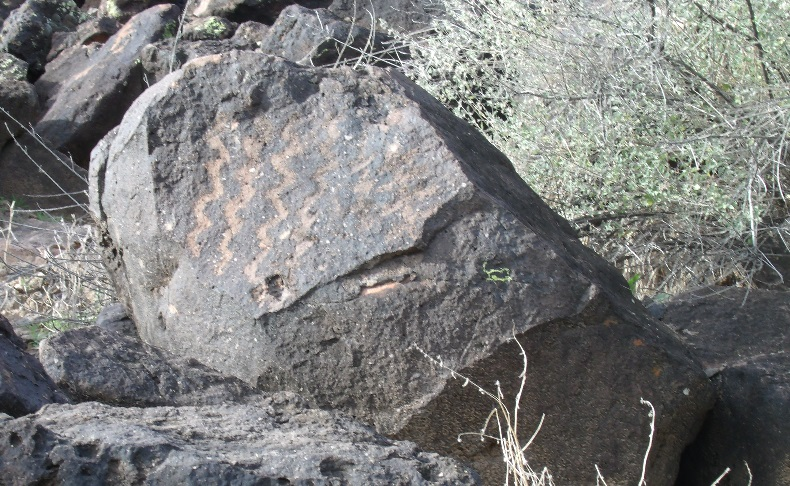
A Petroglyph is a marking carved into a rock usually using a stone tool.

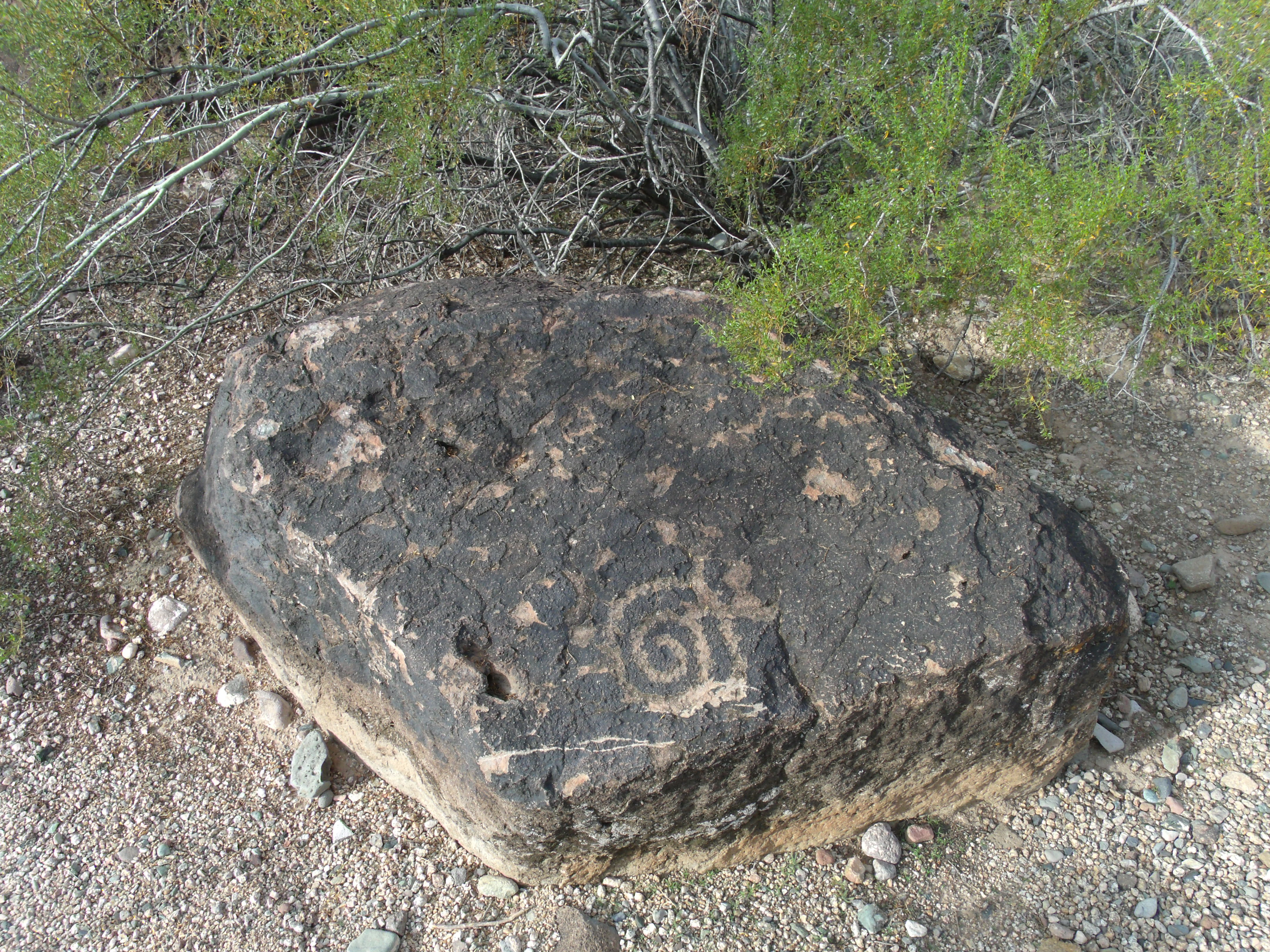
This Petroglyph with a spiral figure carved into it was made by the Hohokams over 1000 years ago.

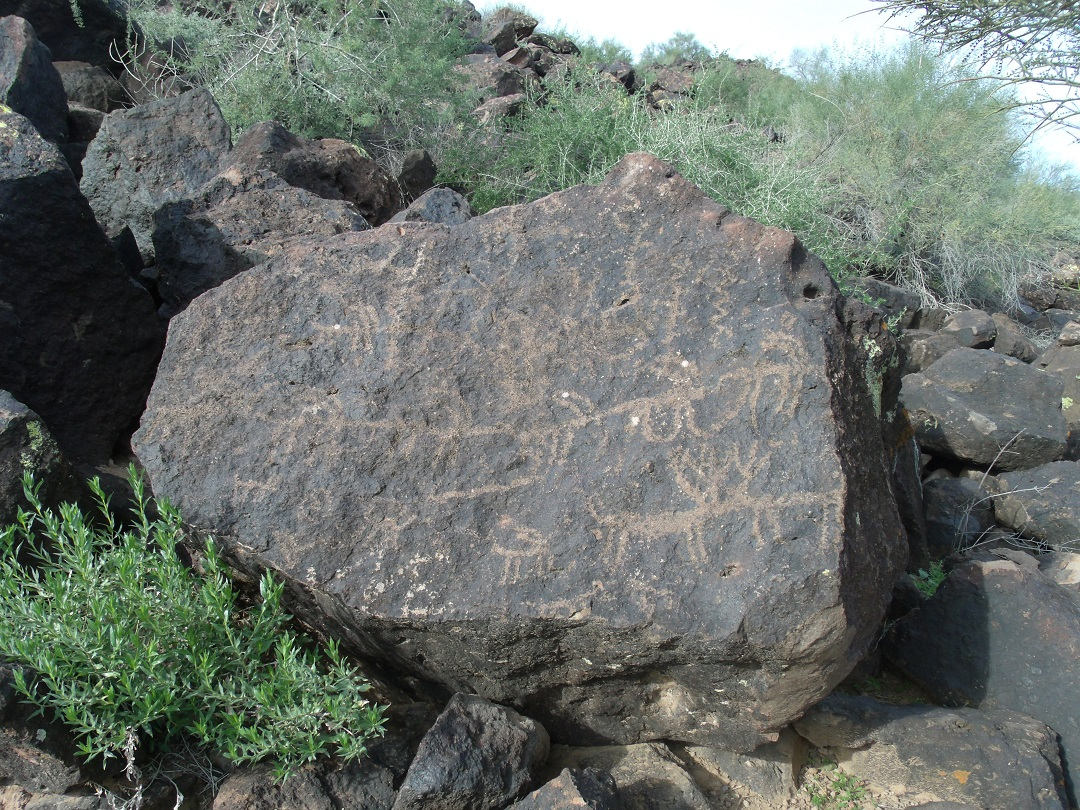
This Hohokam Petroglyph is that of a "scene". In the far right hand corner of the Petroglyph the Hohokams sketched two deers bumping heads.

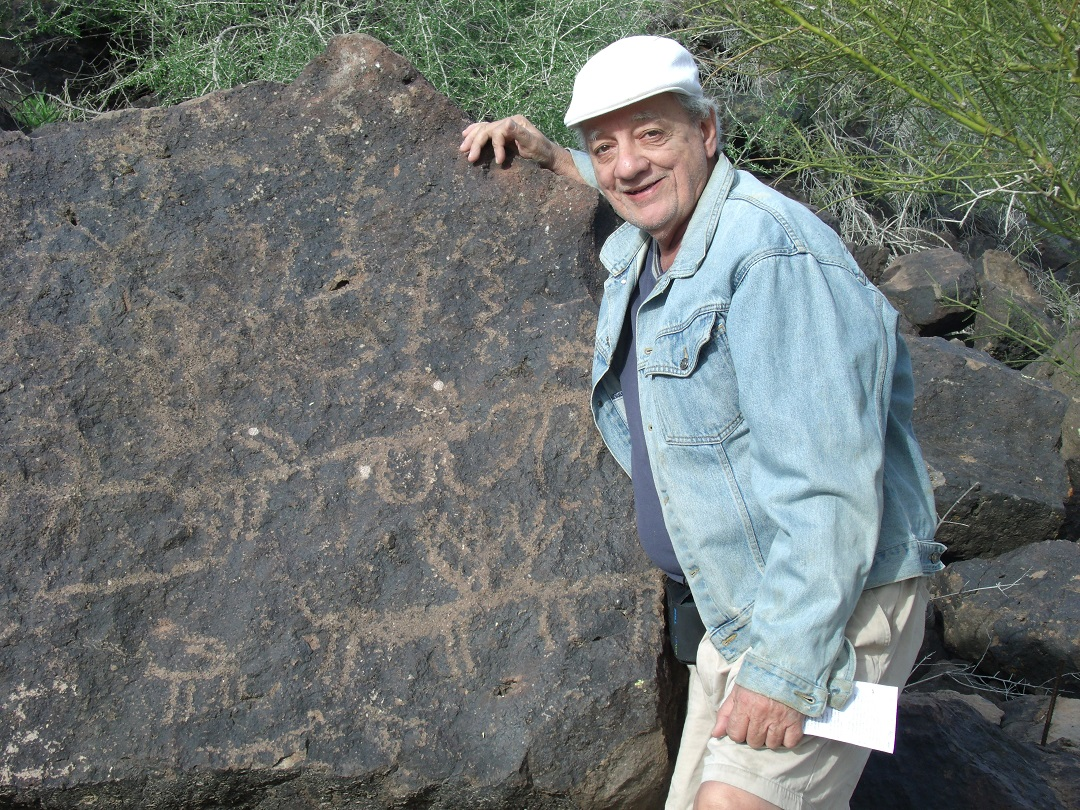
Notice, in this Petroglyph the Hohokams sketched two deers bumping heads in the far lower right hand corner. The two deers bumping heads are the symbol of the Deer Valley Rock Art Center.

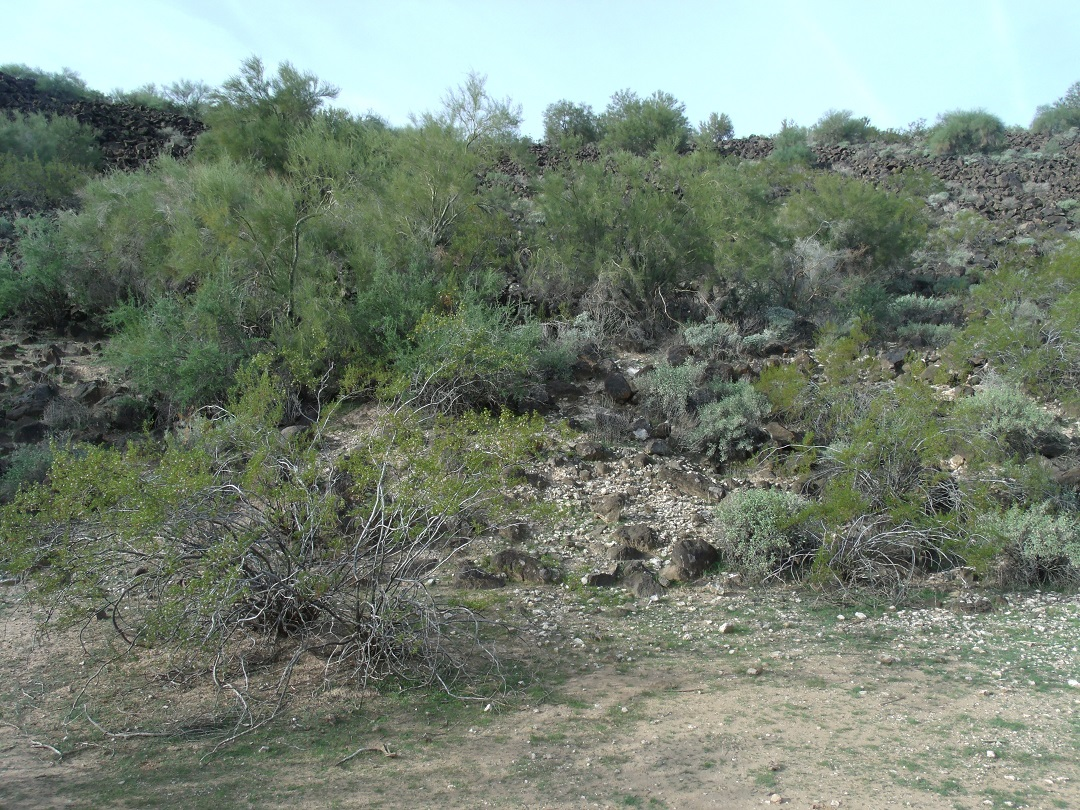
View of the Hedgepath Hills and Sonoran Desert from the Deer Valley Rock Art Center. The rocks in the Hedge Hills were formed in the Pliocene era when lava squeezed up through fissures in the earth. This type of volcanic rock is called basalt.

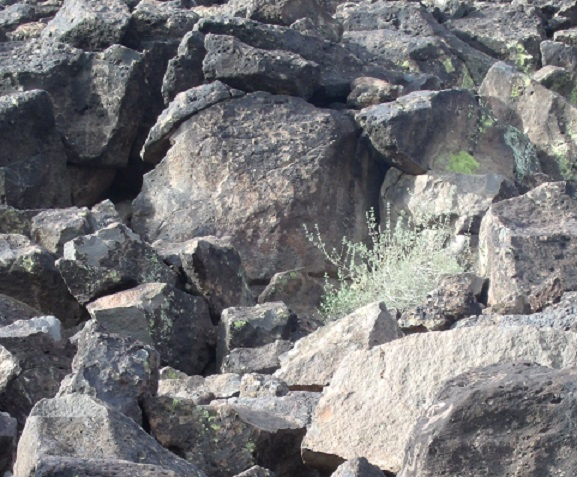
Hohokam Petroglyph scene. The Petroglyphs in this site are dated from 700 AD to 1050 AD.

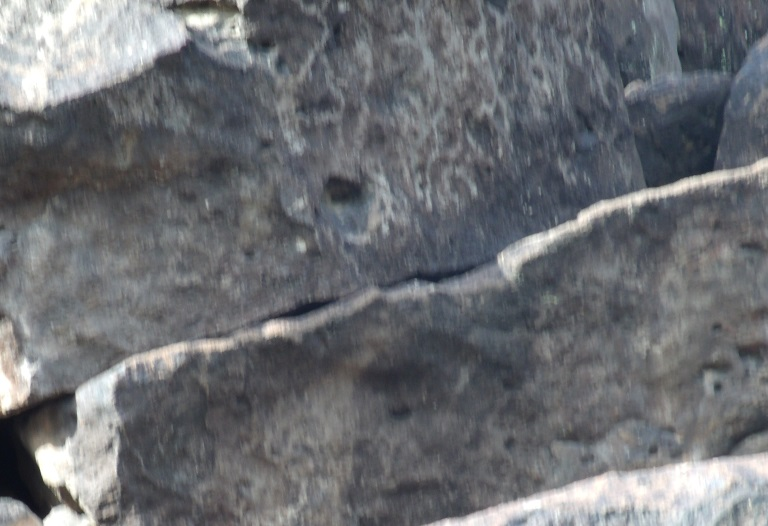
Hohokam Petroglyph.

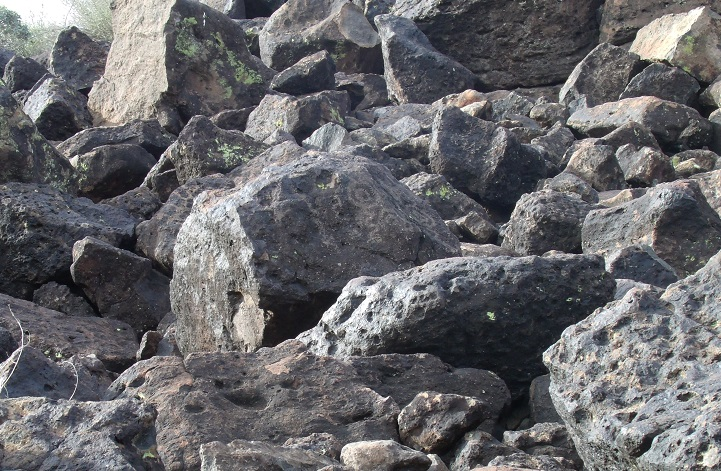
Hohokam Petroglyph.

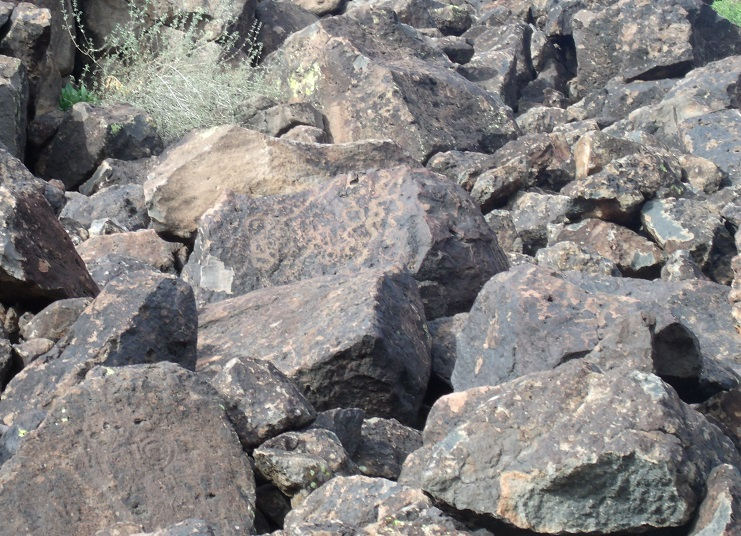
Hohokam Petroglyph.

=== Papago Park ===
The Desert Botanical Garden, Hole-in-the-Rock and Hunt's tomb are located in Papago Park. Papago Park was listed in the Phoenix Historic Property Register in October 1989. The Desert Botanical Garden is designated as a Phoenix Point of Pride. The Webster Auditorium is listed in the National Register of Historic Places.

Papago Park
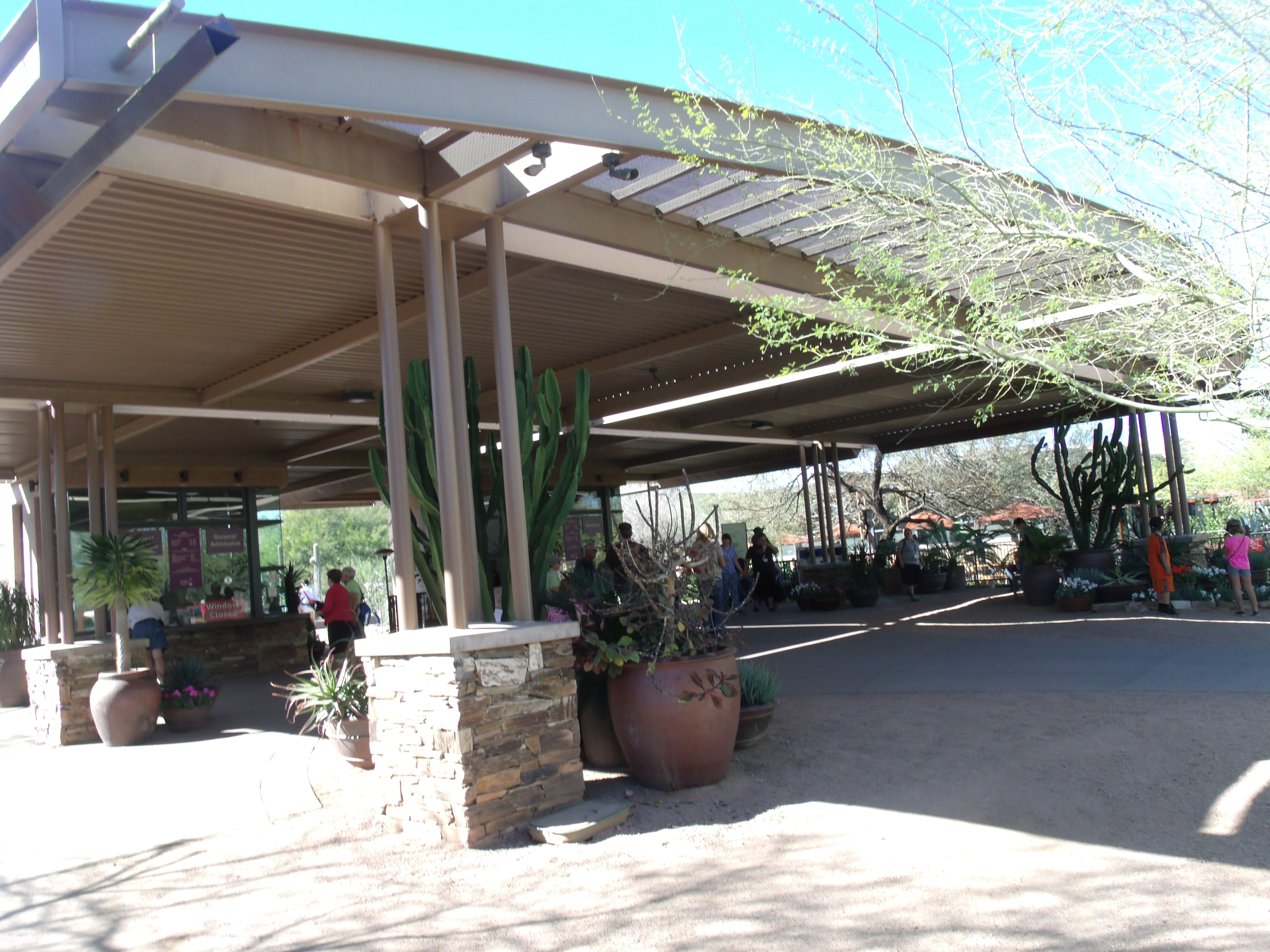
The main entrance of the Desert Botanical Garden.

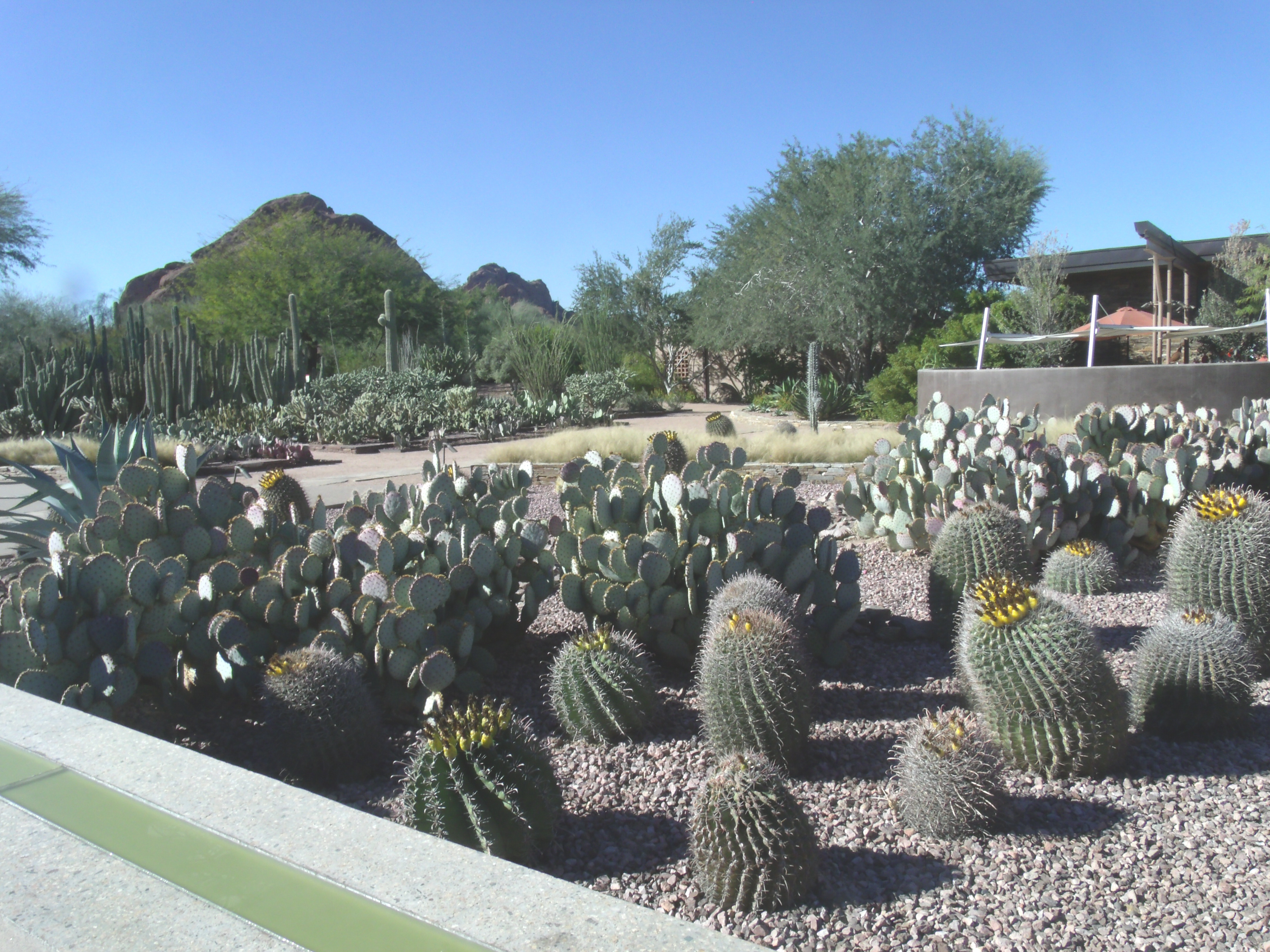
Different species of cacti on display in the Desert Botanical Garden of Phoenix.

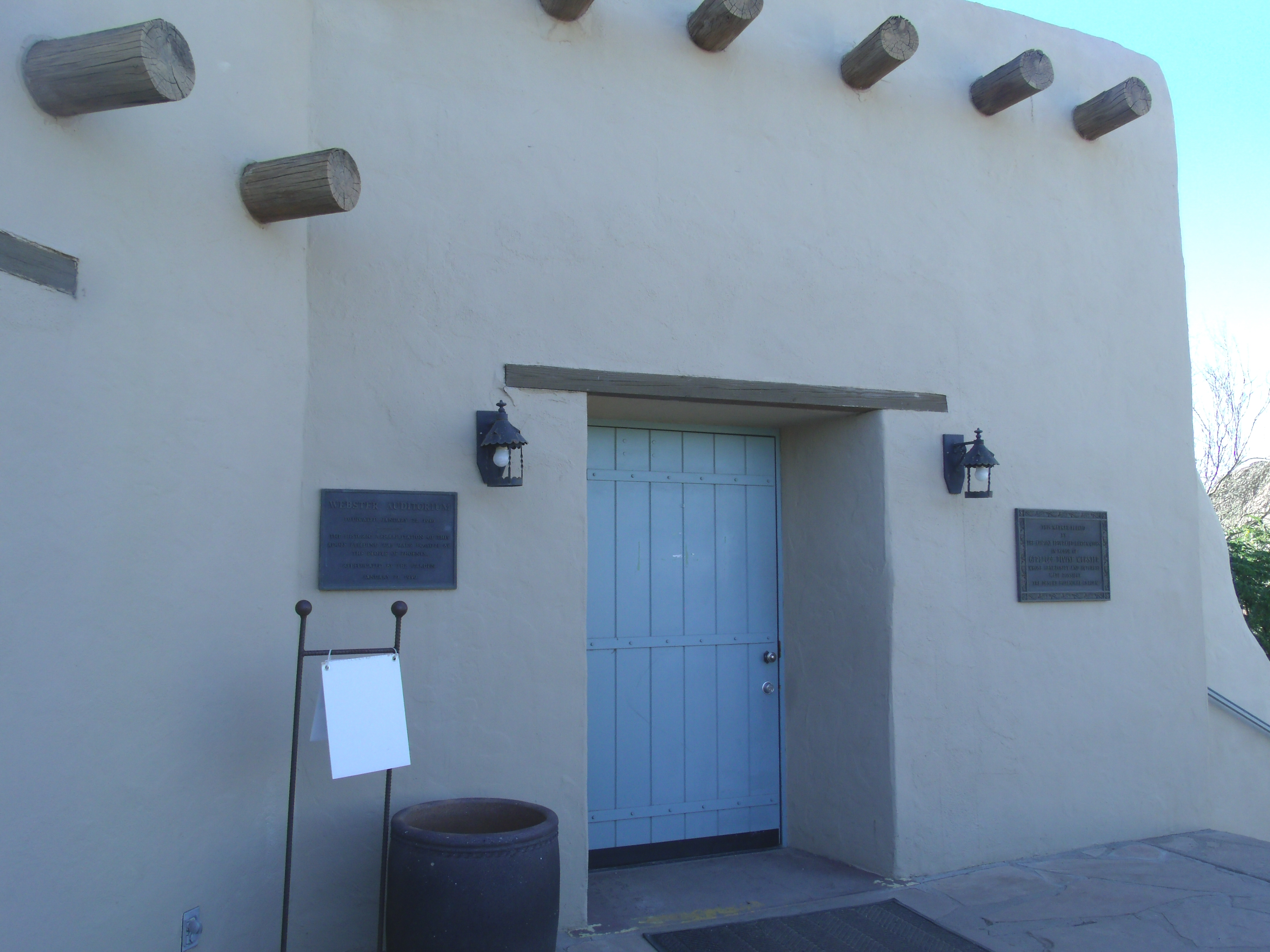
The Webster Auditorium building was constructed in 1939 and is located inside the compounds of the Desert Botanical Garden at 1201 N. Galvin Parkway in Phoenix. In 1937, Gertrude Webster joined newly established Arizona Cactus and Native Flora Society. She offered her encouragement, connections and financial support. Webster served as society's first president and served in its board of directors. The auditorium is named after Gertrude Webster. On June 13, 1990, the National Park Service certified Webster Auditorium as listed in the National Register of Historic Places on May 1, 1990, assigned it the reference number 9000823.

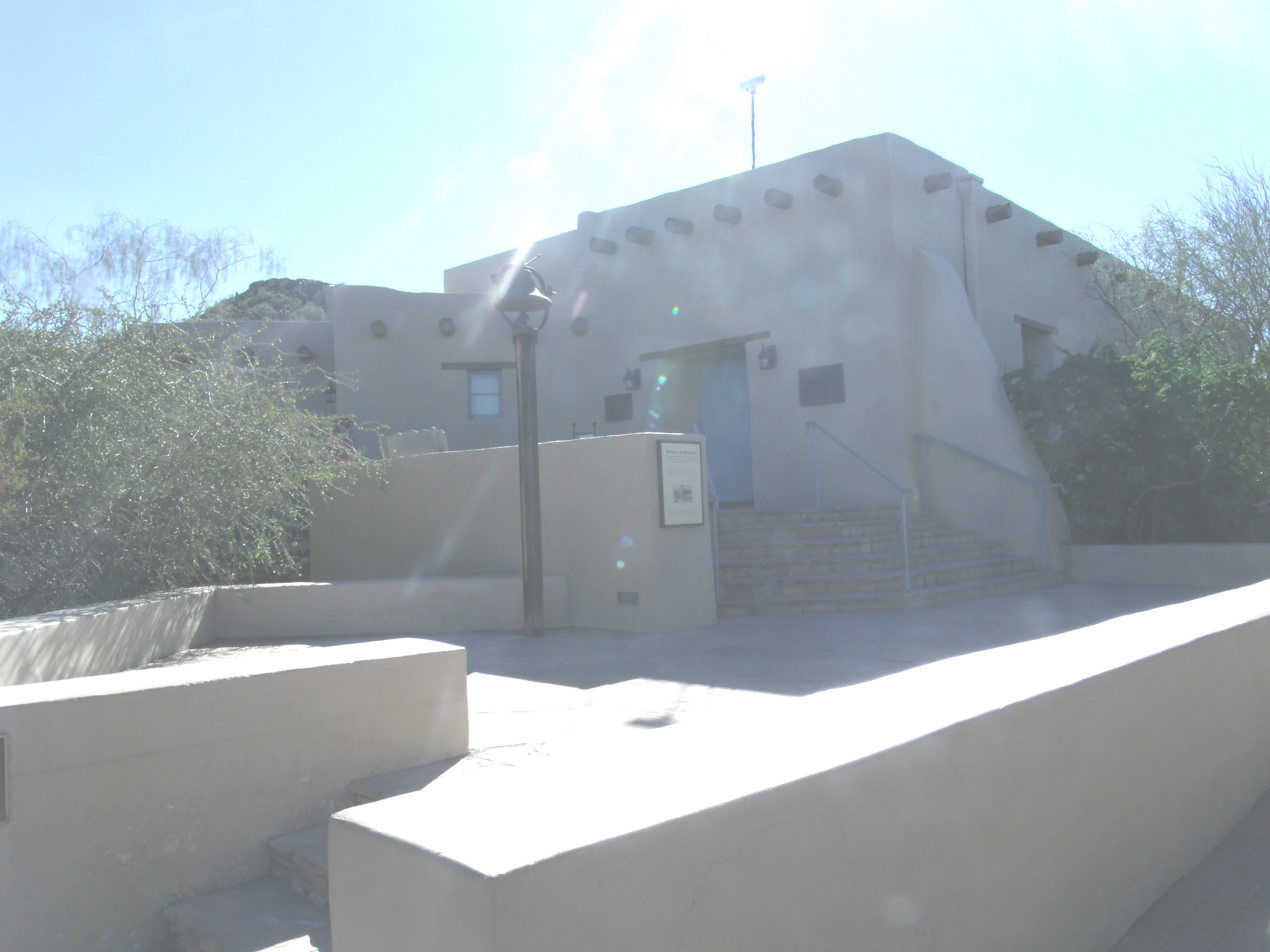
Webster Auditorium.

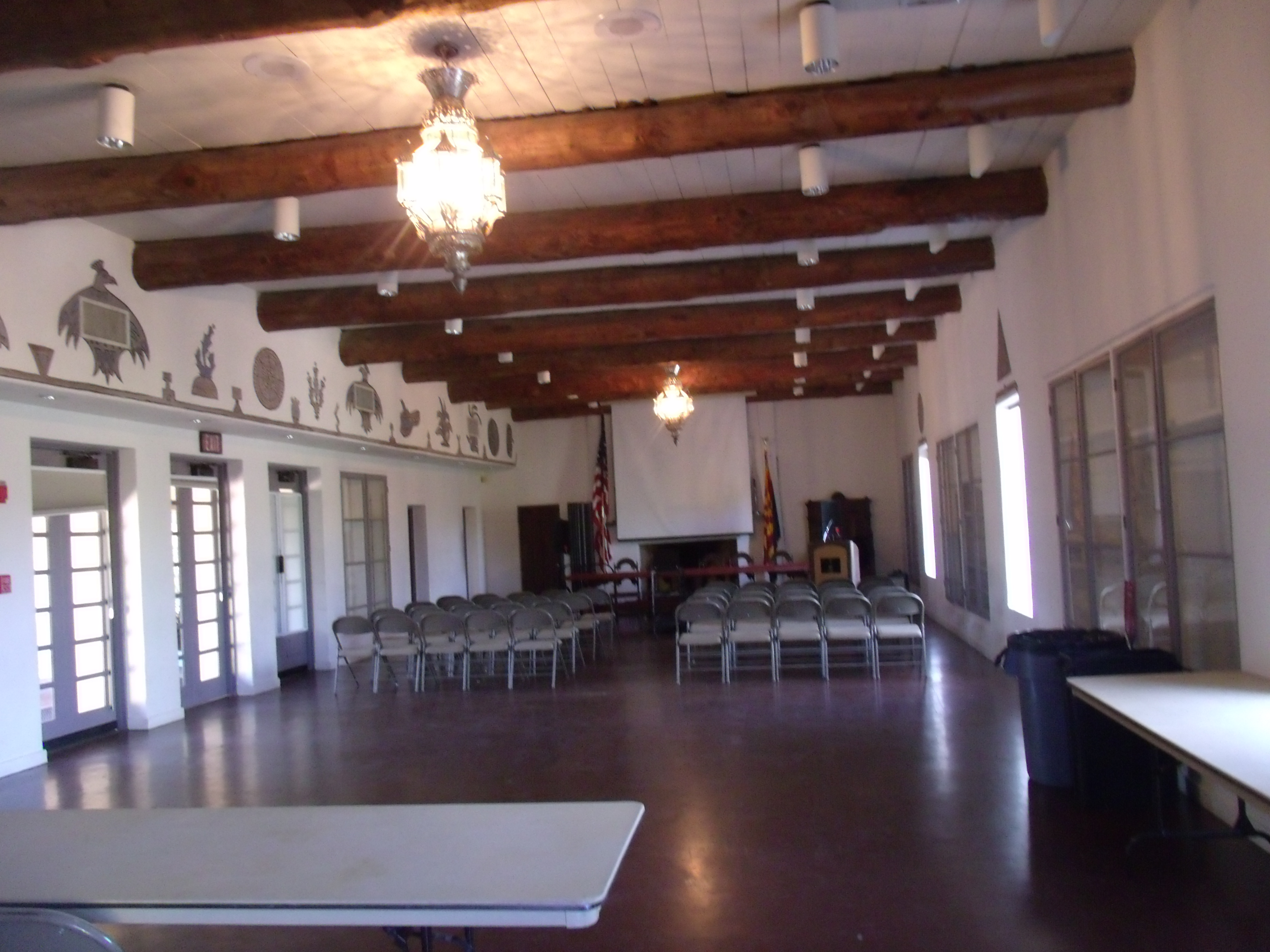
Inside the historic Webster Auditorium, located inside the compounds of the Desert Botanical Garden at 1201 Galvin Parkway. The auditorium was listed in the National Register of Historic Places on May 1, 1990, ref: 9000823.

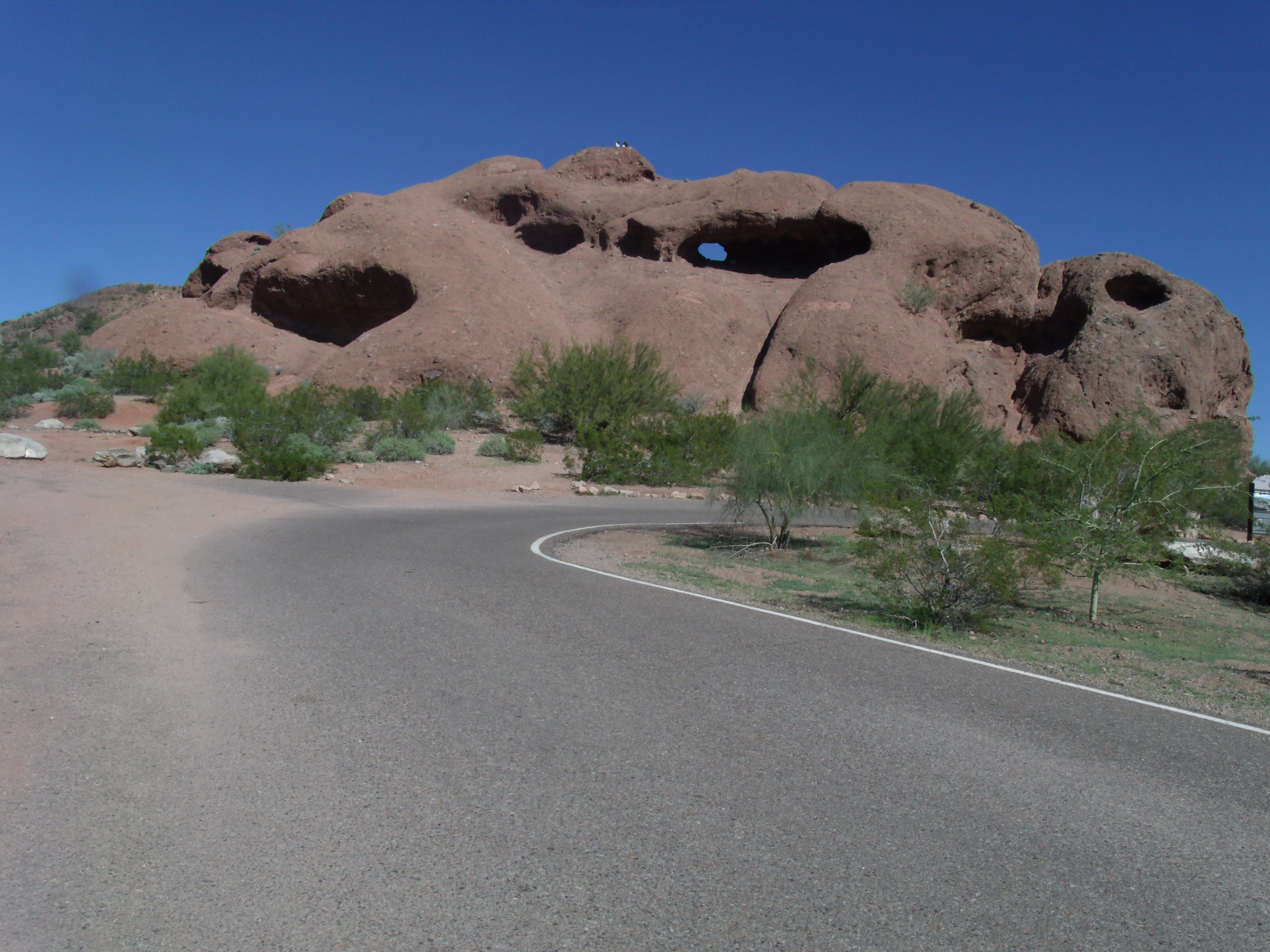
The Hole-in-the-Rock is a Phoenix landmark located in Papgo Park. It is a series of openings (tafoni) eroded in a small hill composed of bare red arkosic conglomeritic sandstone. The sandstone was first formed some 6-15 million years ago from the accumulation of materials eroding from a Precambrian granite, long since eroded away.

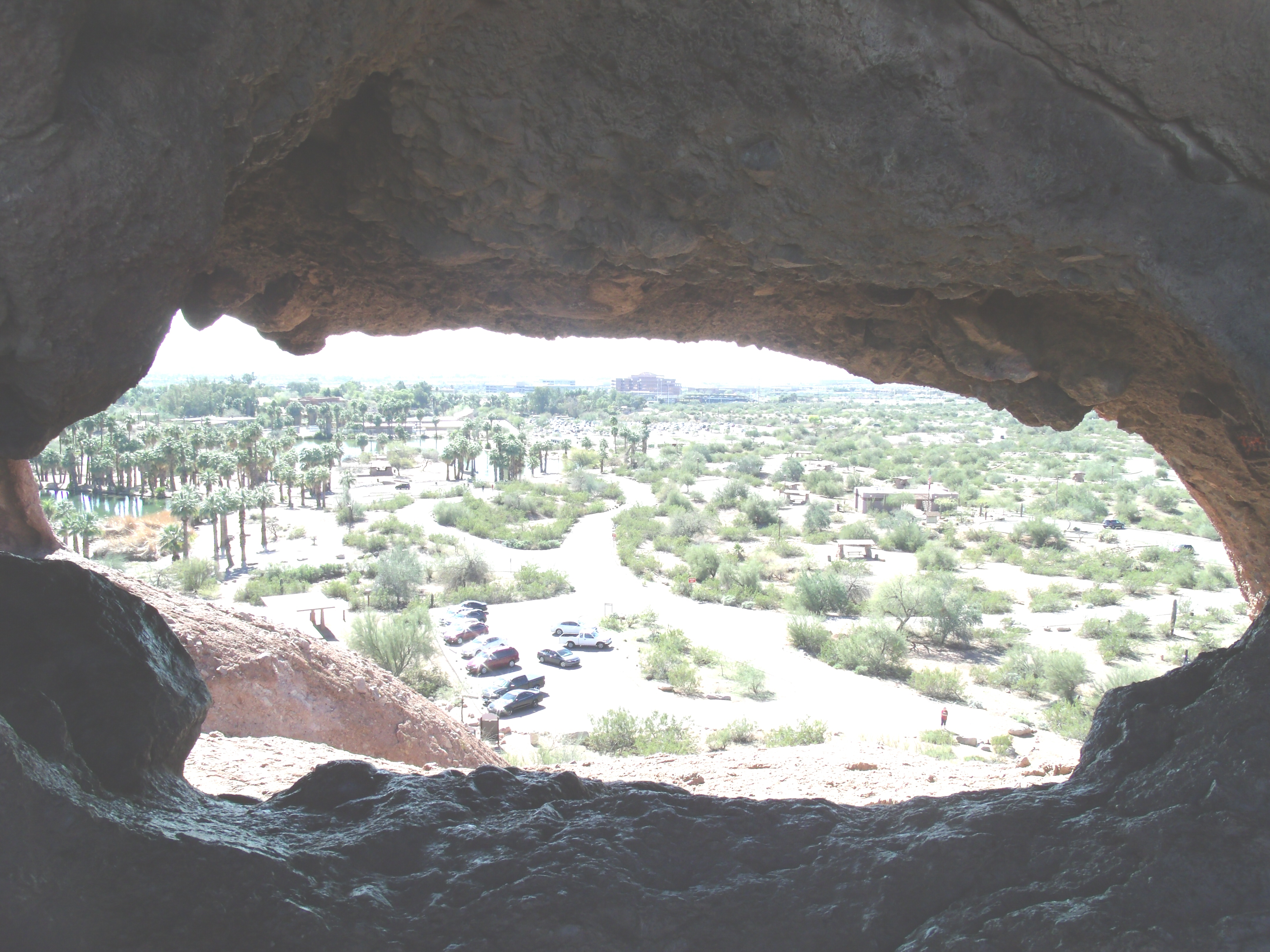
View from inside the Hole-in-the-Rock, a Phoenix landmark located in Papago Park.

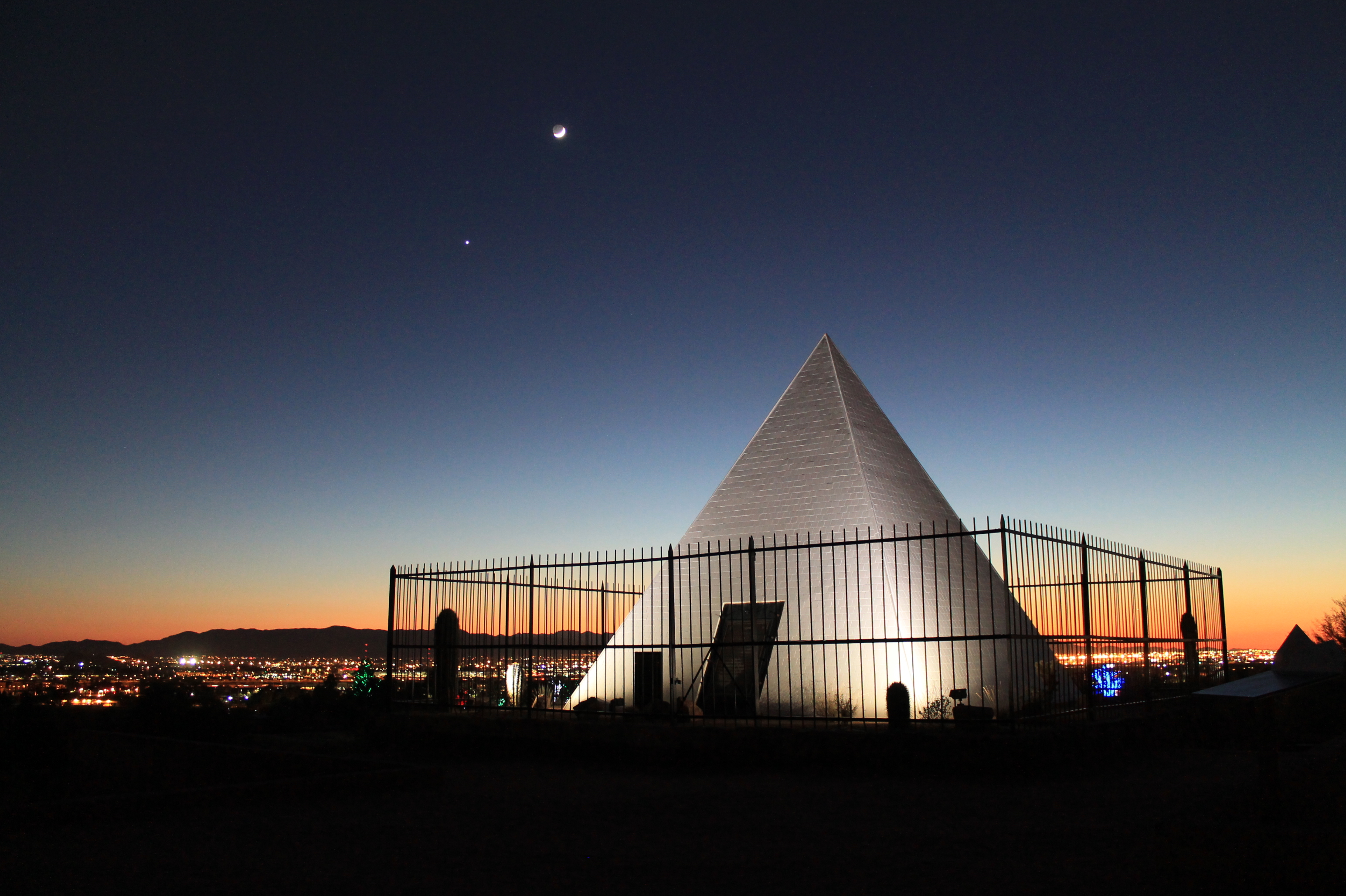
Hunt's Tomb in Papago Park. George W. P. Hunt was the first Governor of Arizona, serving a total of seven terms. The tomb was listed in the National Register of Historic Places, reference #08000526.

== Museums ==
A museum is a building or place where objects of historical, artistic, or scientific interest are exhibited, preserved, or studied. There are many museums in Phoenix, among them the Heard Museum, an art museum which serves as a showcase for Native American culture and the Phoenix Art Museum, which showcases artwork since the Renaissance.

This section of the list includes the Pioneer Living History Museum and the Phoenix Trolley Museum. The Pioneer Living History Museum has 30 historic original and reconstructed buildings from the 1880s and early 1900s on its 90-acre property. The main exhibit of the Phoenix Trolley Museum is the historic trolley car #116, a restored 1928 trolley which served the original Phoenix trolley system.

This section also includes images of cars exhibited in the Martin Auto Museum and some of the historic musical instruments on exhibit in the Musical Instrument Museum. The Martin Auto Museum is dedicated to the preservation of historical and collectible automobiles for educational purposes and the Musical Instrument Museum, which bills itself as "The World's Only Global Musical Instrument Museum", displays more than 6,500 instruments collected from around 200 of the world's countries and territories. Among the exhibits is the Steinway piano that John Lennon used to compose the song "Imagine", Elvis Presley's guitar, a 1900 Cuatro, and displays dedicated to various countries.

=== Pioneer Living History Museum ===
Original historic buildings and structures
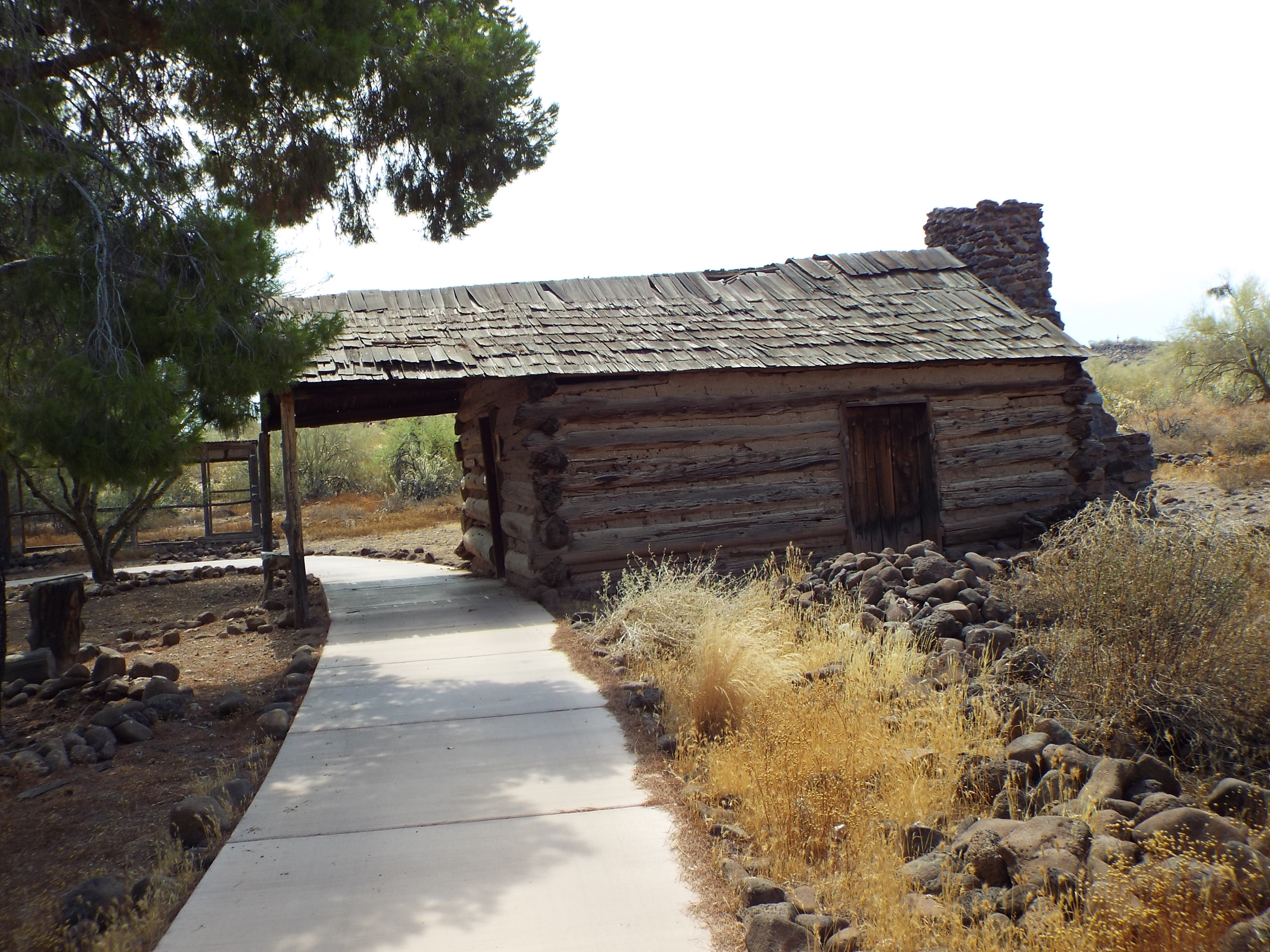
The Ashurst Cabin was built in 1878 near Prescott. This was the boyhood home of Senator Henry Fountain Ashurst, the first Arizona senator following statehood. Ashurst served in the senate from 1912 to 1942. The family cooked their food in the fireplace, however during the summer they did their cooking outside over a campfire. The family lived in the cabin until 1893.

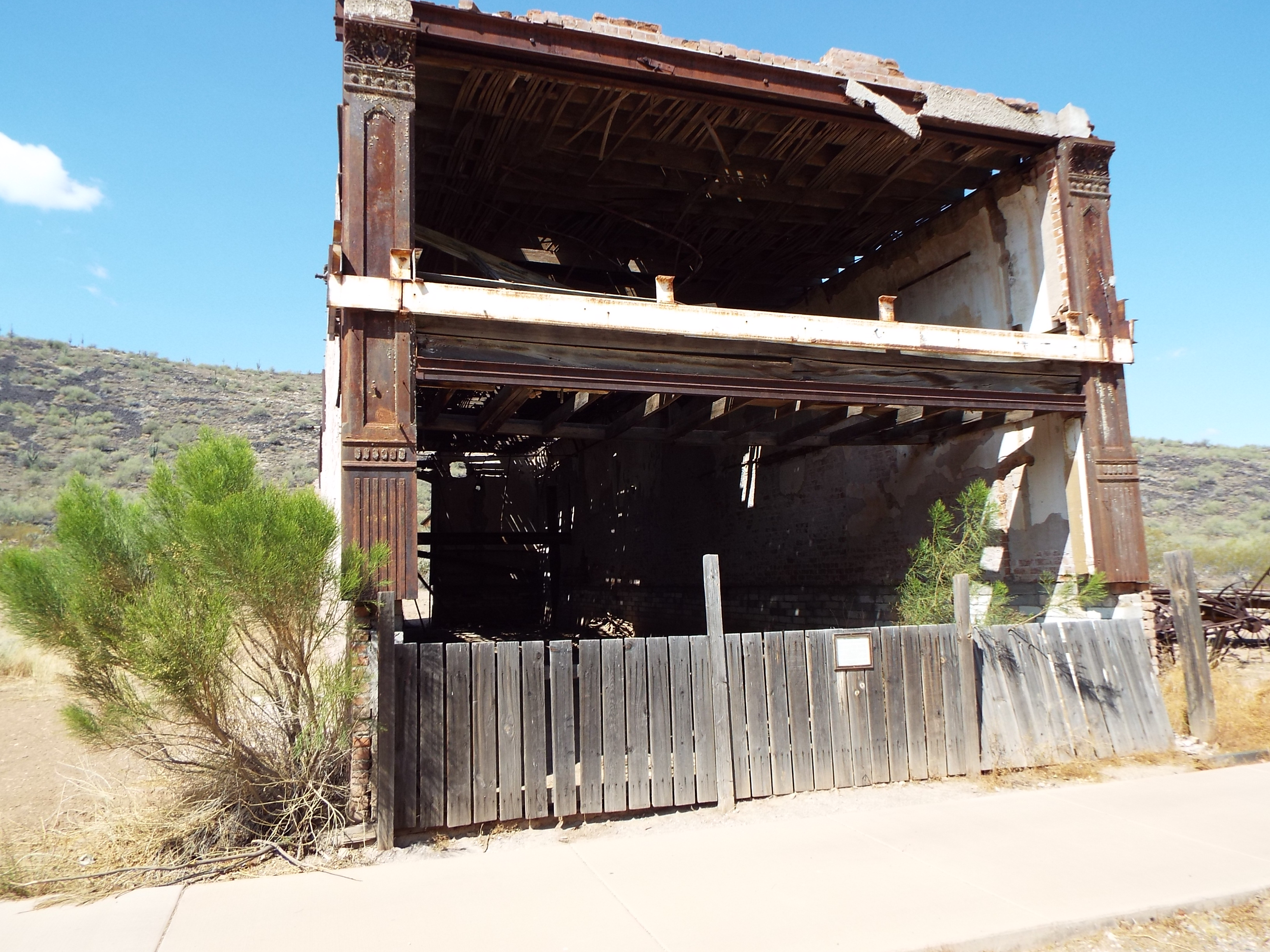
The Phoenix Bakery building was built in 1881 and was originally located at 7 West Washington Street in Phoenix. Edward Elsele and Alfred Becker owned the bakery. In 1910, the bakery became the first one in the territory to try out a horseless carriage to deliver their products. In 1929, the sons of the original owners inherited the bakery. They decided to go wholesale and renamed their product Holsum. What was left of the shell of the bakery building was donated to the Pioneer Living History Museum.

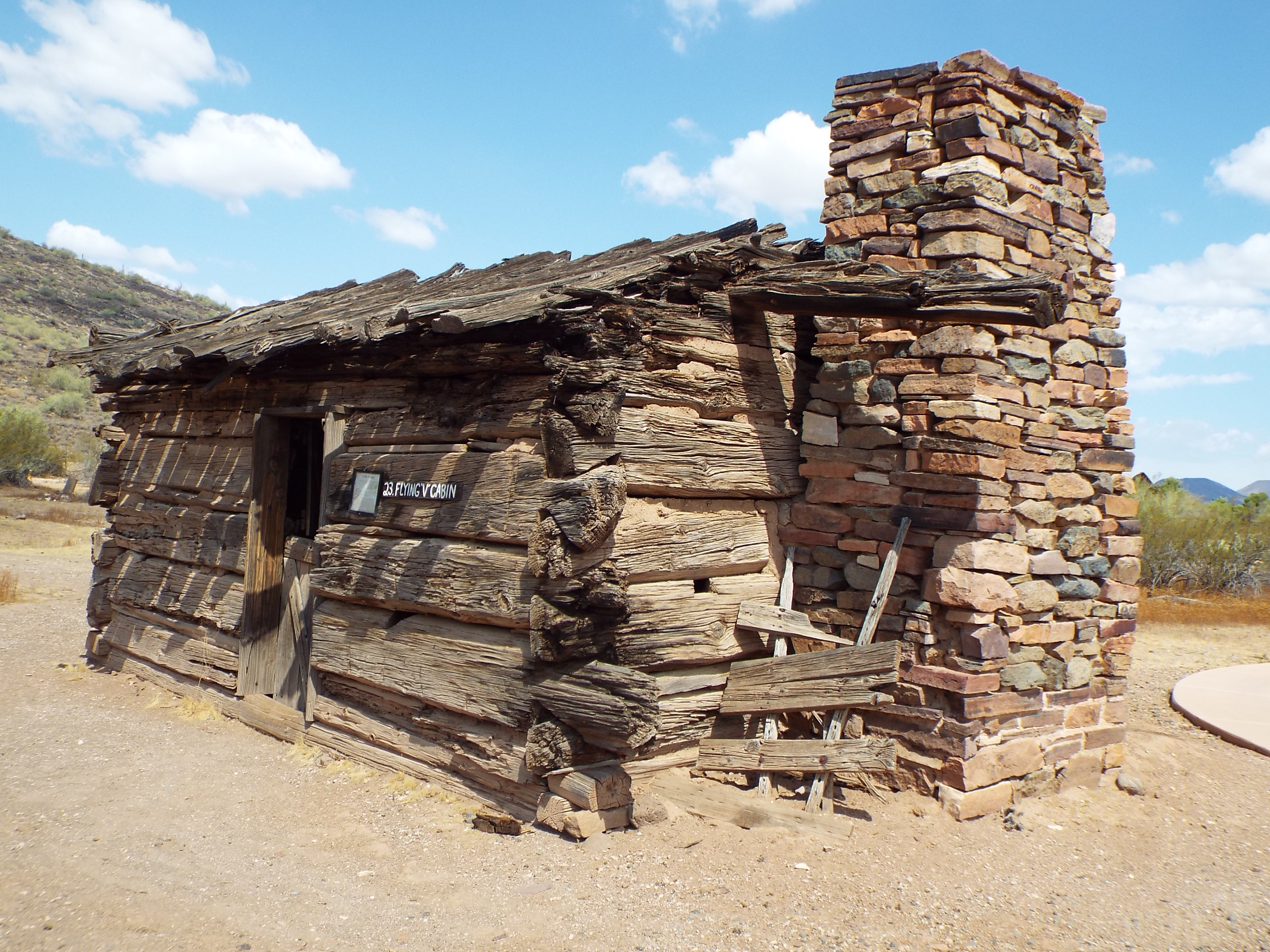
The Flying "V" Cabin was built in 1880 and was located in Canyon Creek, Young, Arizona. The cabin has notched gun ports which were used on July 17, 1882, during the Battle of Big Dry Wash, the last Apache War in that area. John D. Tewksbury Sr., of Pleasant Valley War fame lived here with his two wives and children.

=== Phoenix Trolley Museum ===
Phoenix Trolley Museum

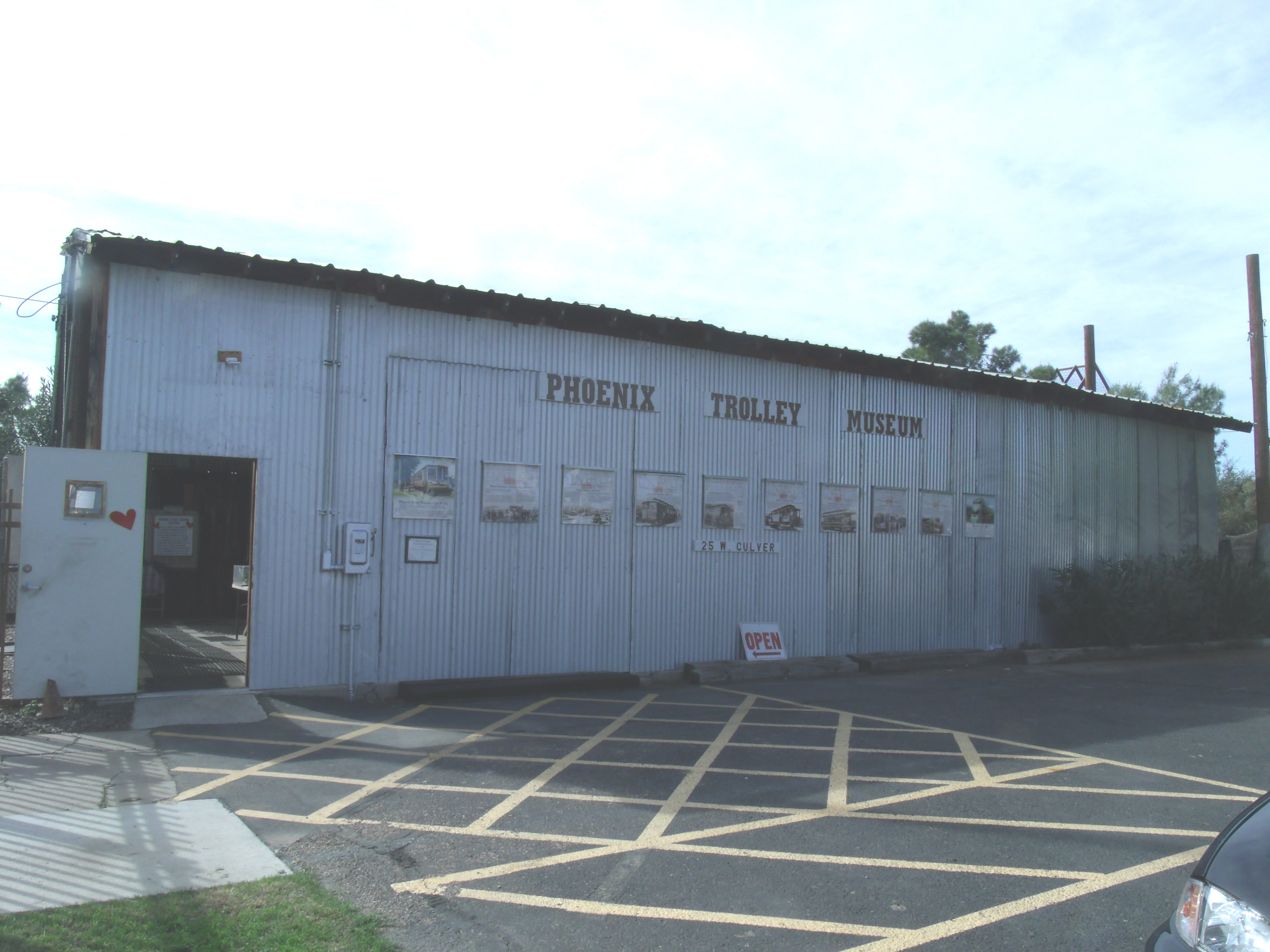
The Phoenix Trolley Museum, located at 25 W. Culver St. The main exhibit of the museum is trolley car #116, a restored 1928 trolley which served the original Phoenix trolley system.

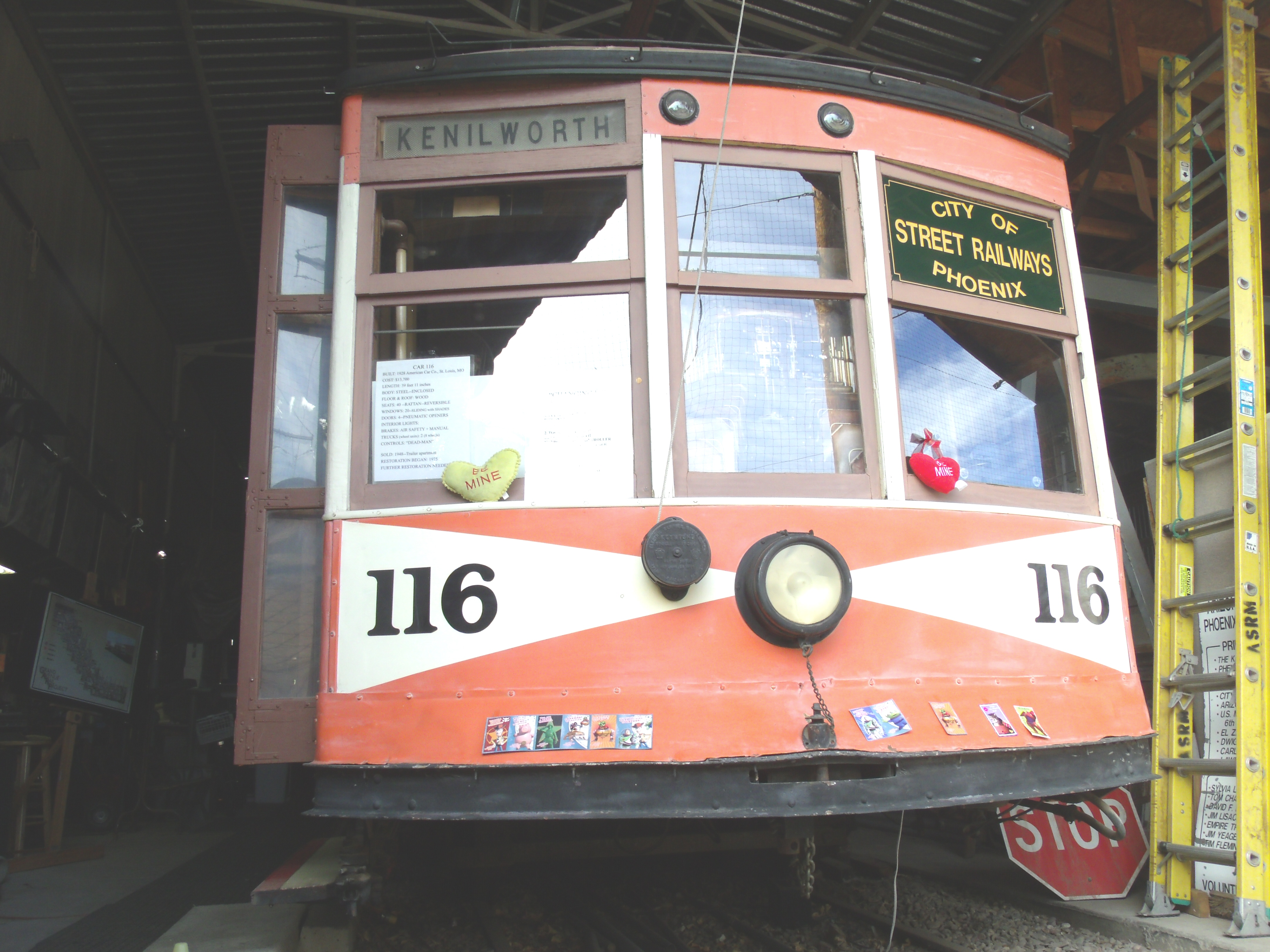
Historic Trolley Car #116 . The 1928 trolley served the original Phoenix trolley system from 1928 to 1947. It was restored by the Arizona Historical Society. The trolley is on exhibit in the Phoenix Trolley Museum at 25 W. Culver St.

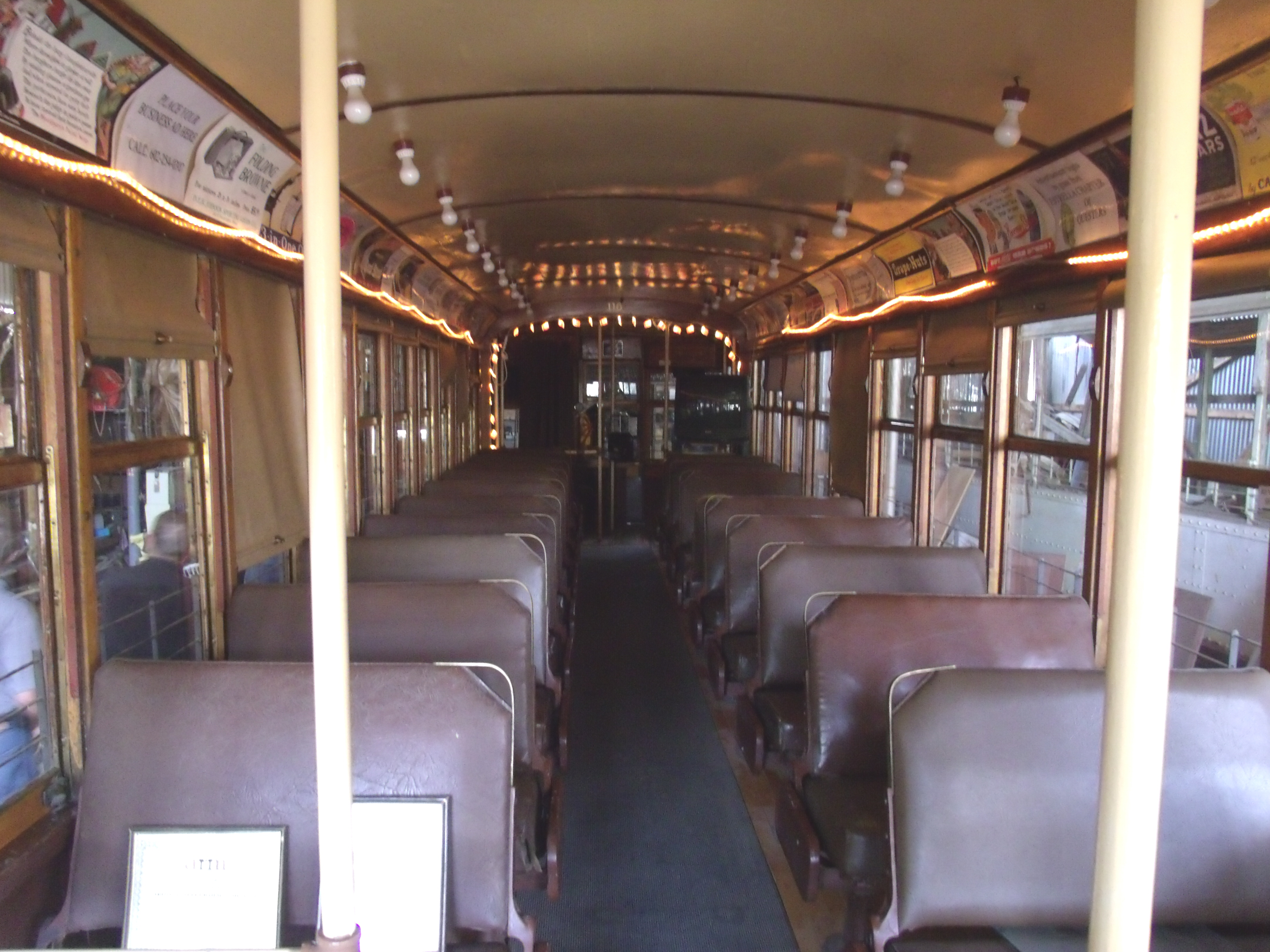
Inside the historic Trolley Car #116

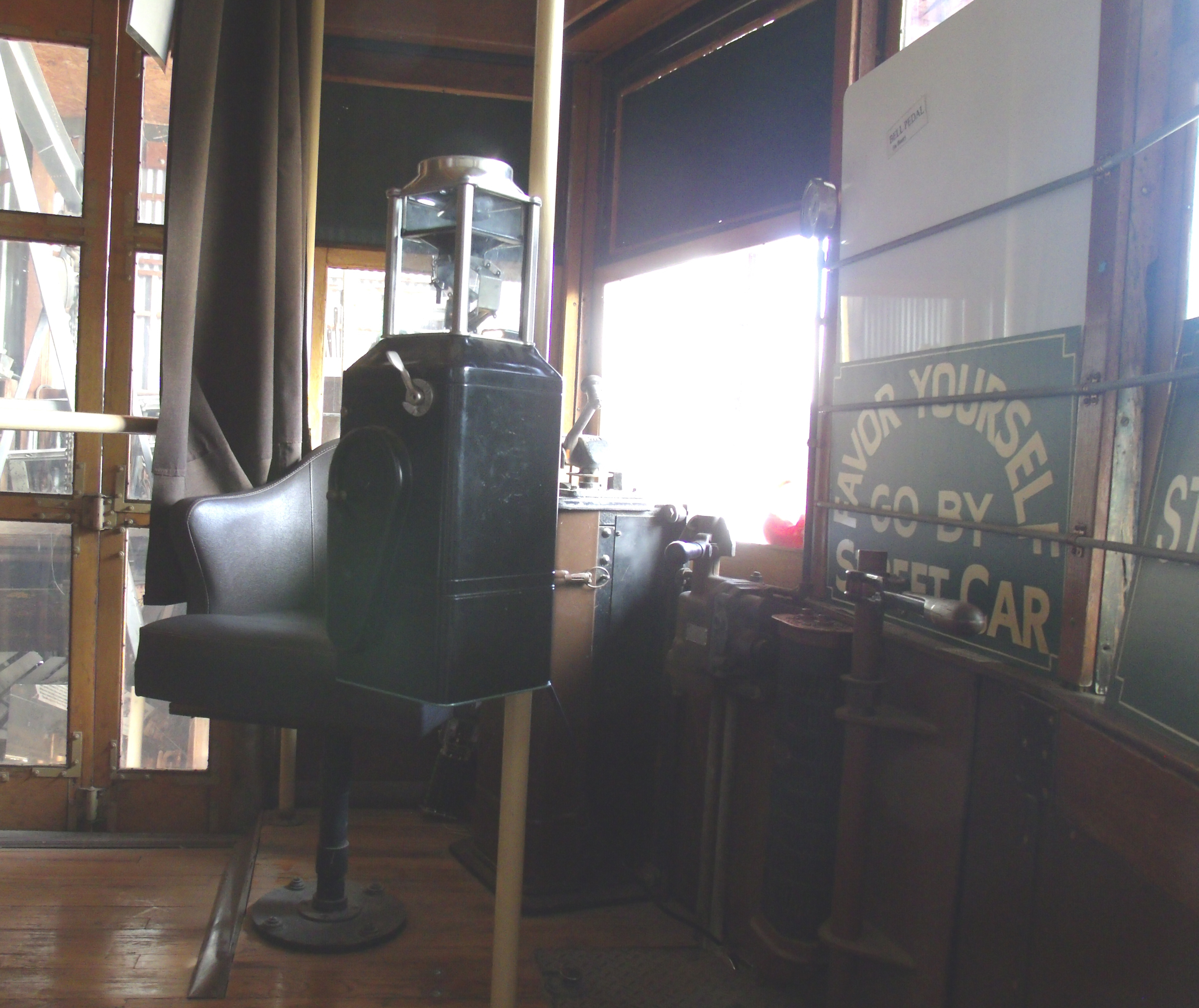
Front inside view of Trolley Car #116. Pictured is a restored farebox.

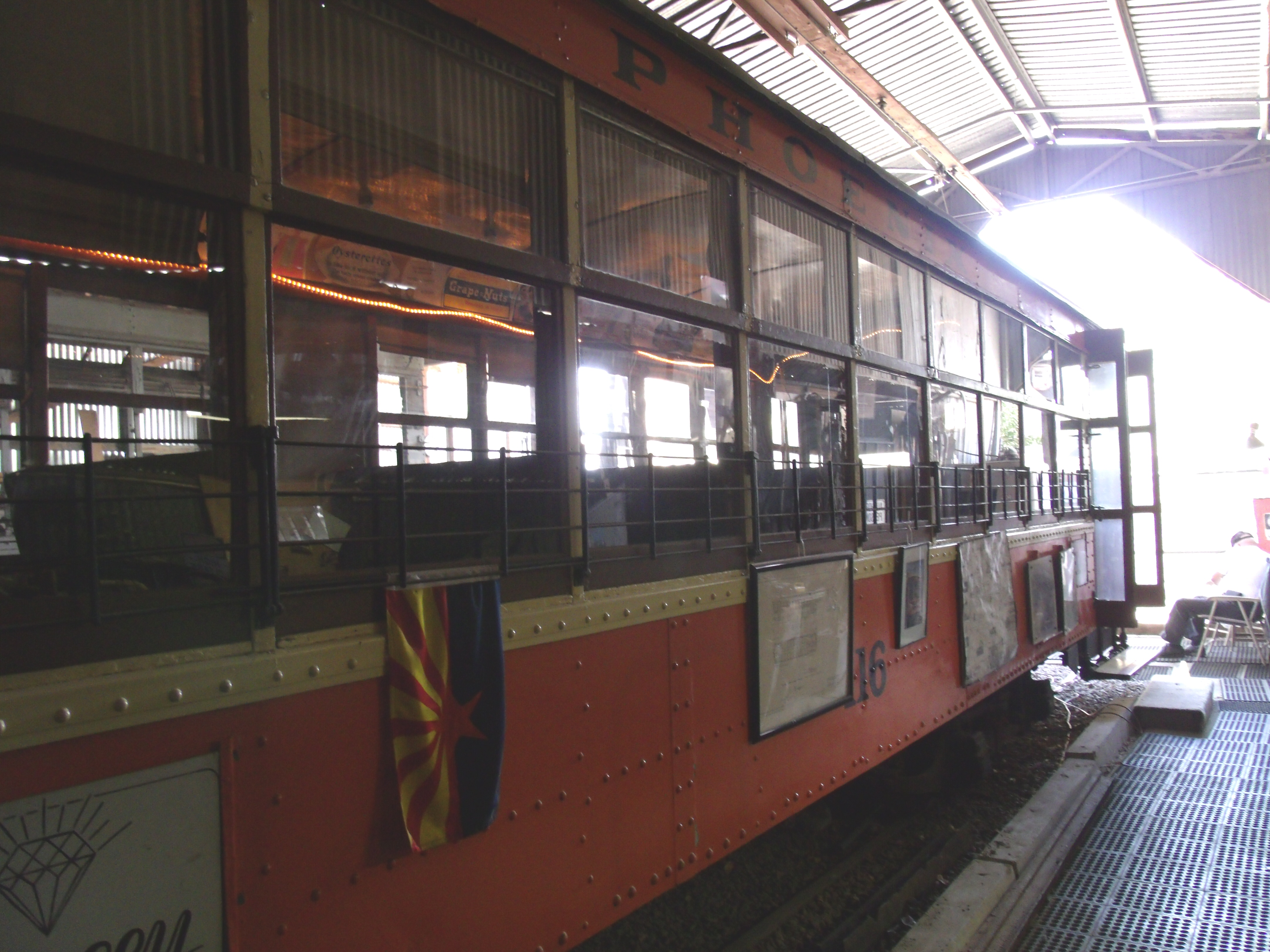
Different view of Trolley Car #116.

=== Martin Auto Museum ===
Martin Auto Museum

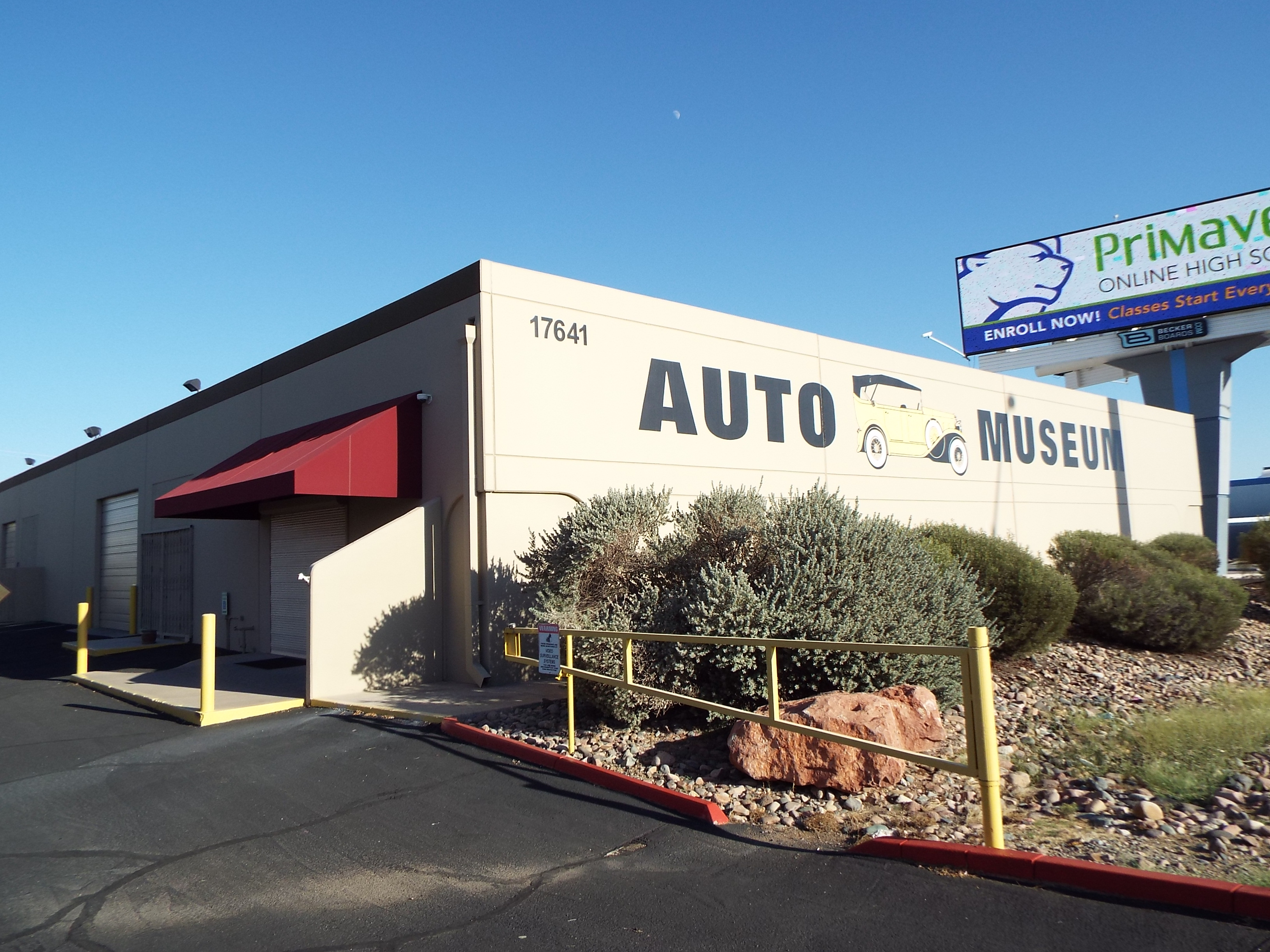
Martin Auto Museum

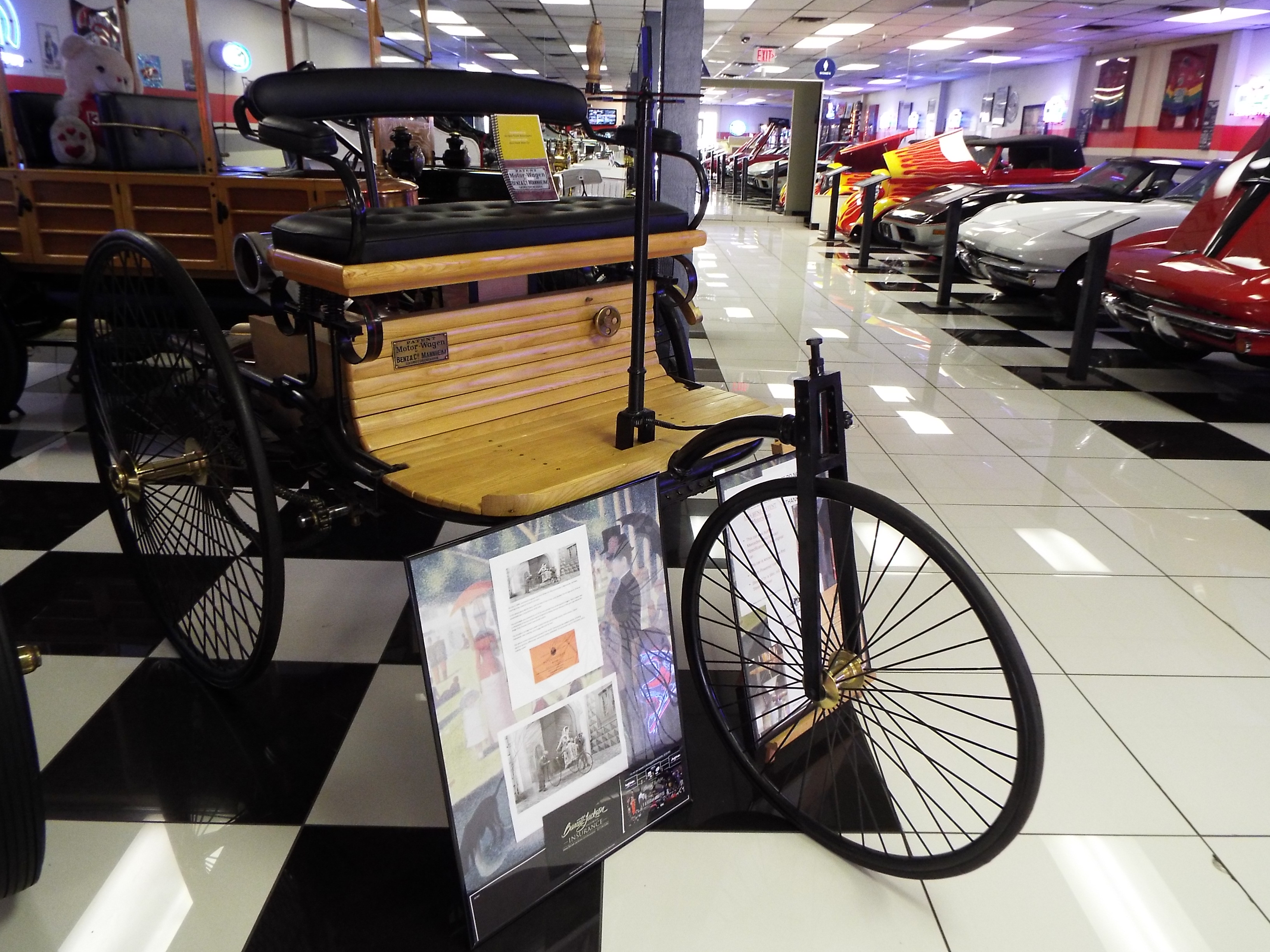
1886 Benz Patent-Motorwagen.

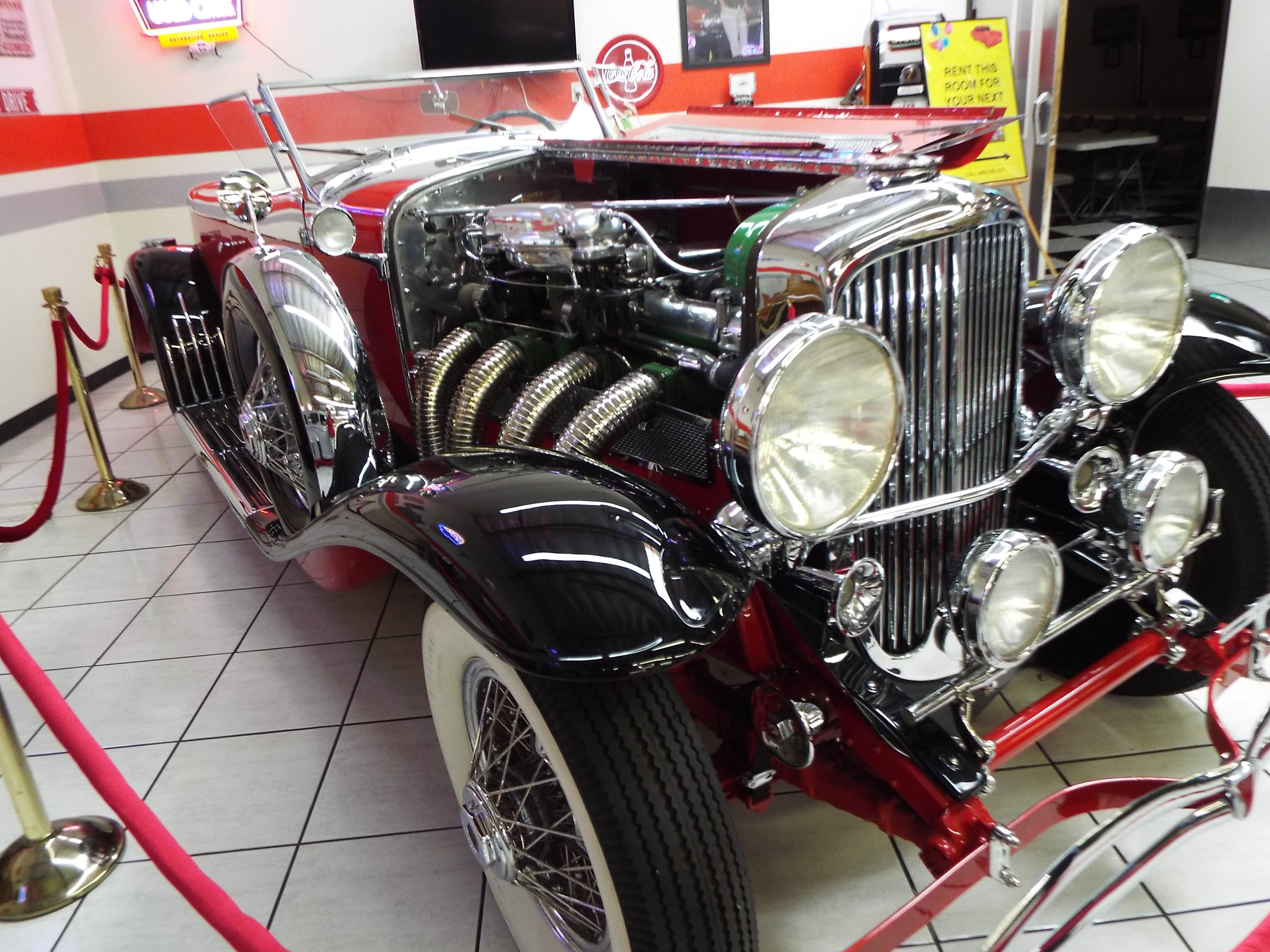
A 1930 convertible Duesenberg "J" Boattail Speedster which once belonged to gangster John Factor, an associate of Al Capone.

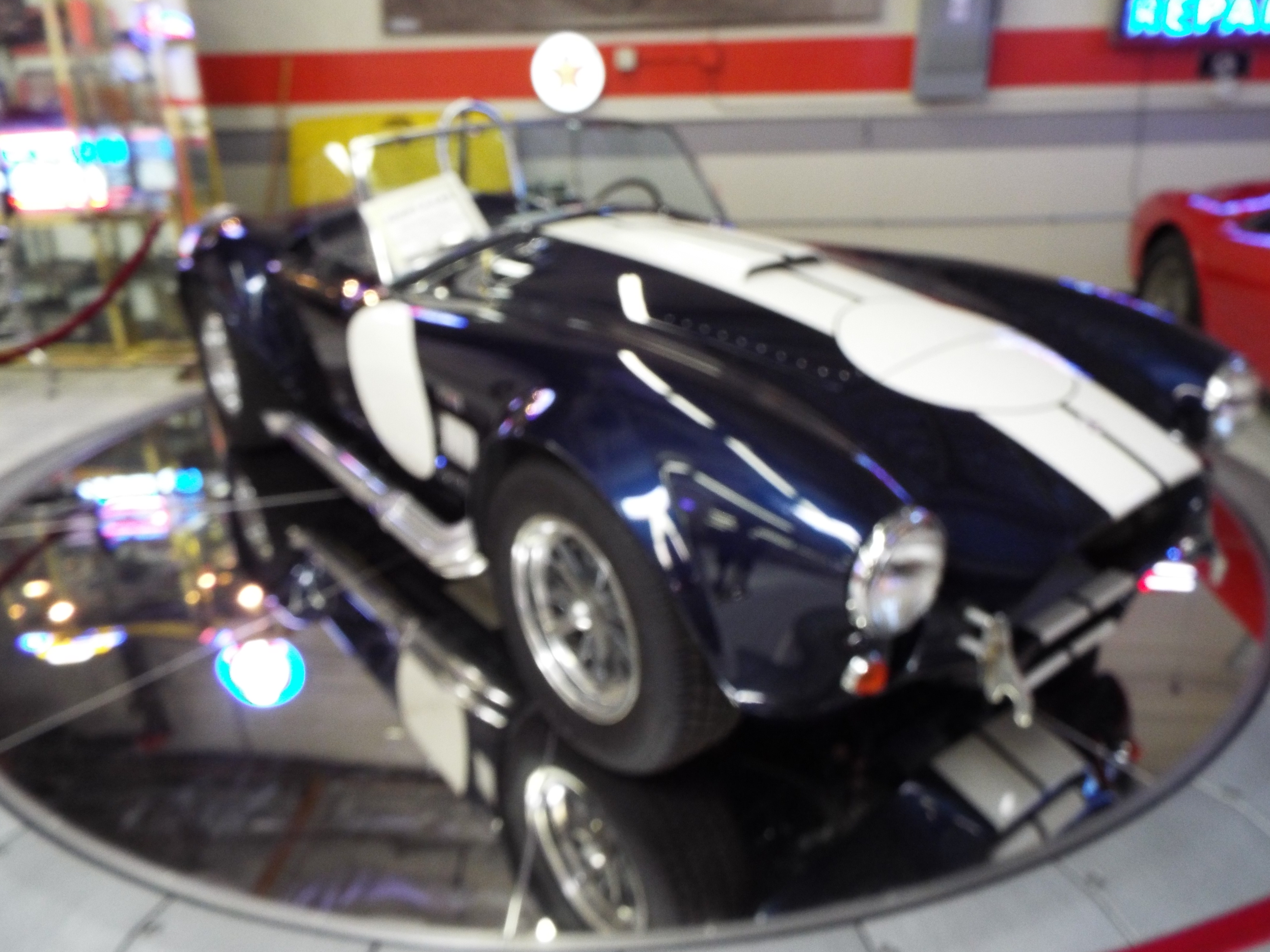
A 1965 Shelby Cobra, once owned by Carroll Shelby. The vehicles dashboard was autographed by Shelby.

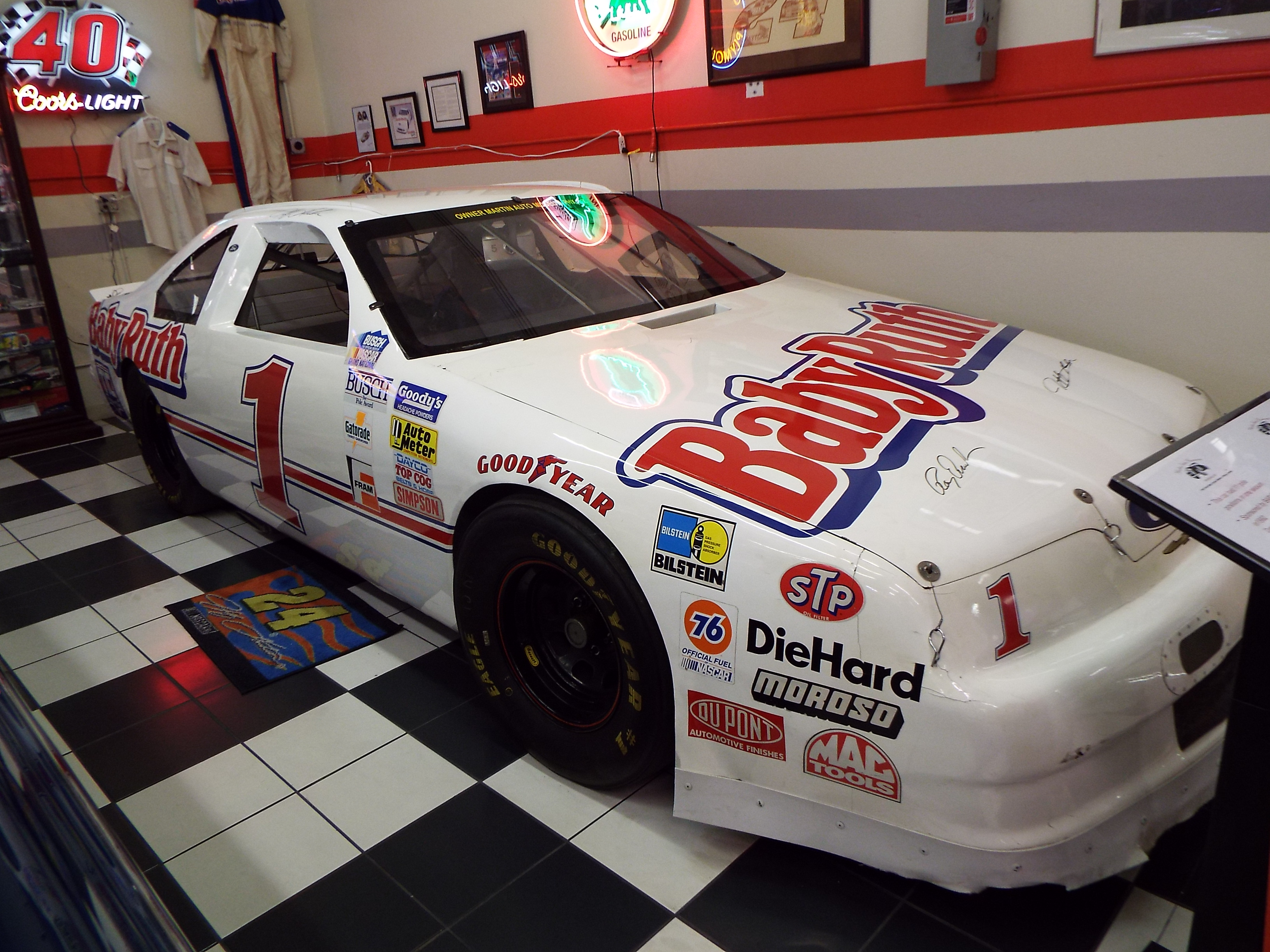
1990 Jeff Gordon's Ford NASCAR Race Car.

=== Musical Instrument Museum ===
Musical Instrument Museum

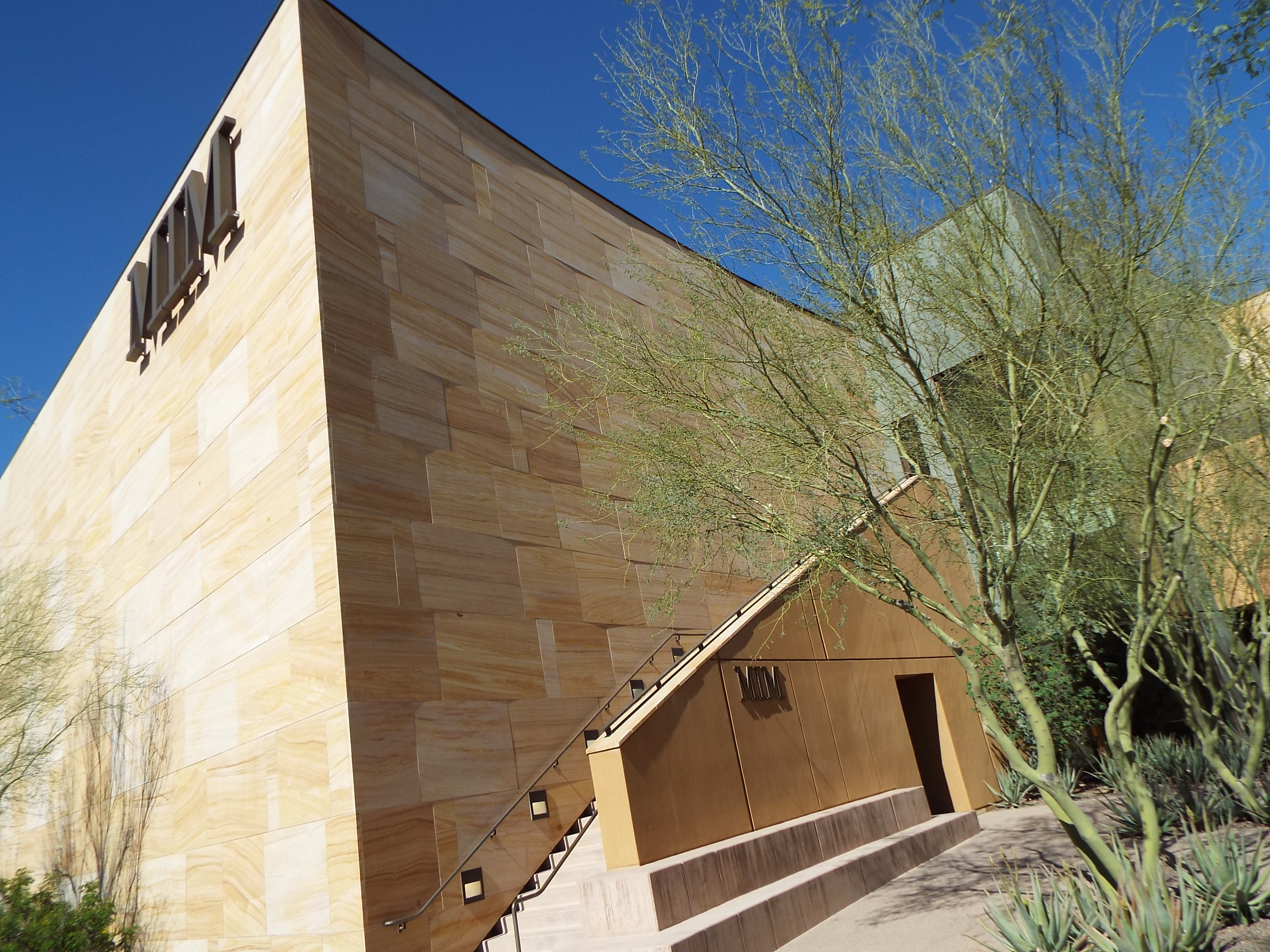
Musical Instrument Museum

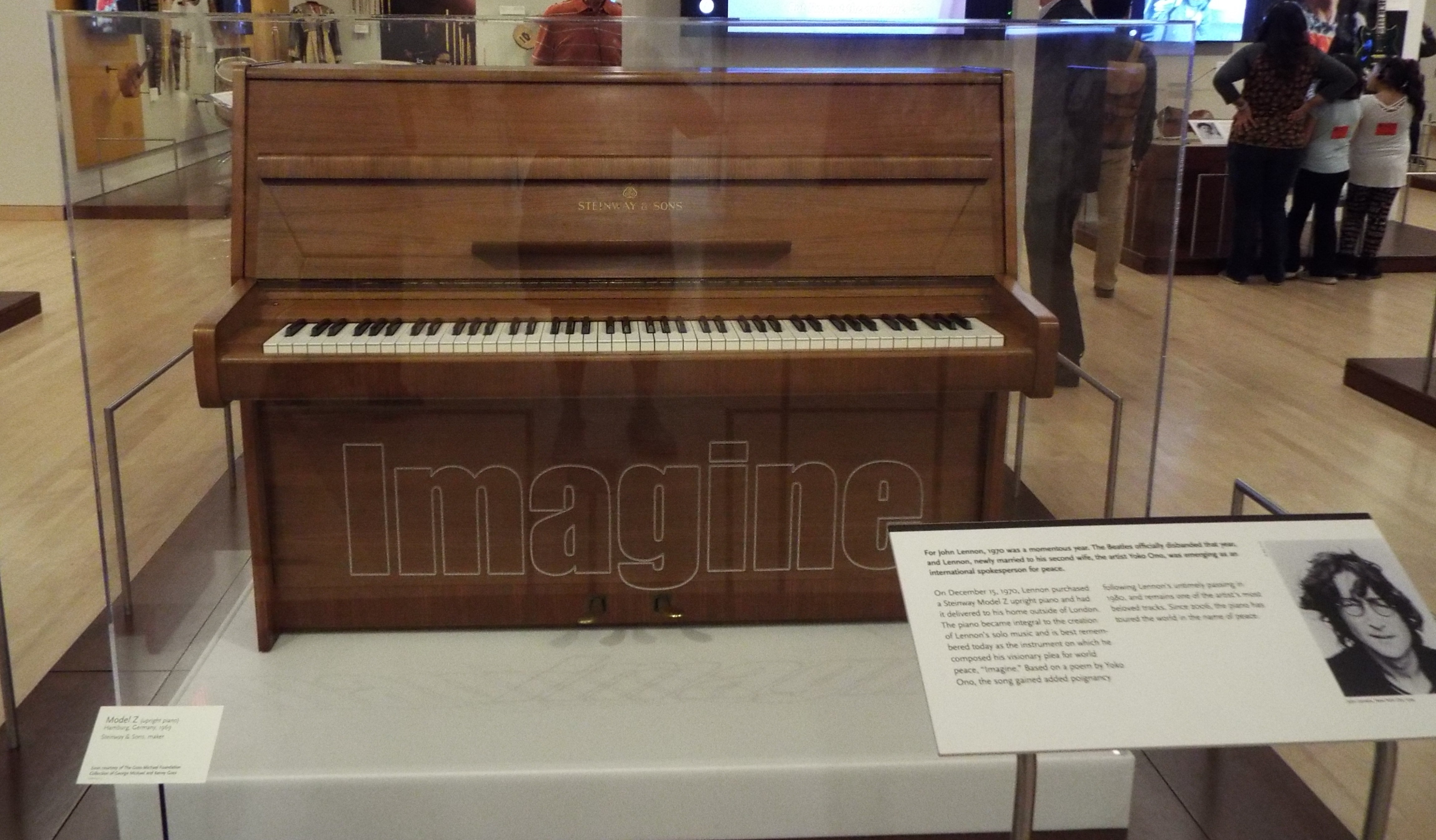
The John Lennon Steinway piano.

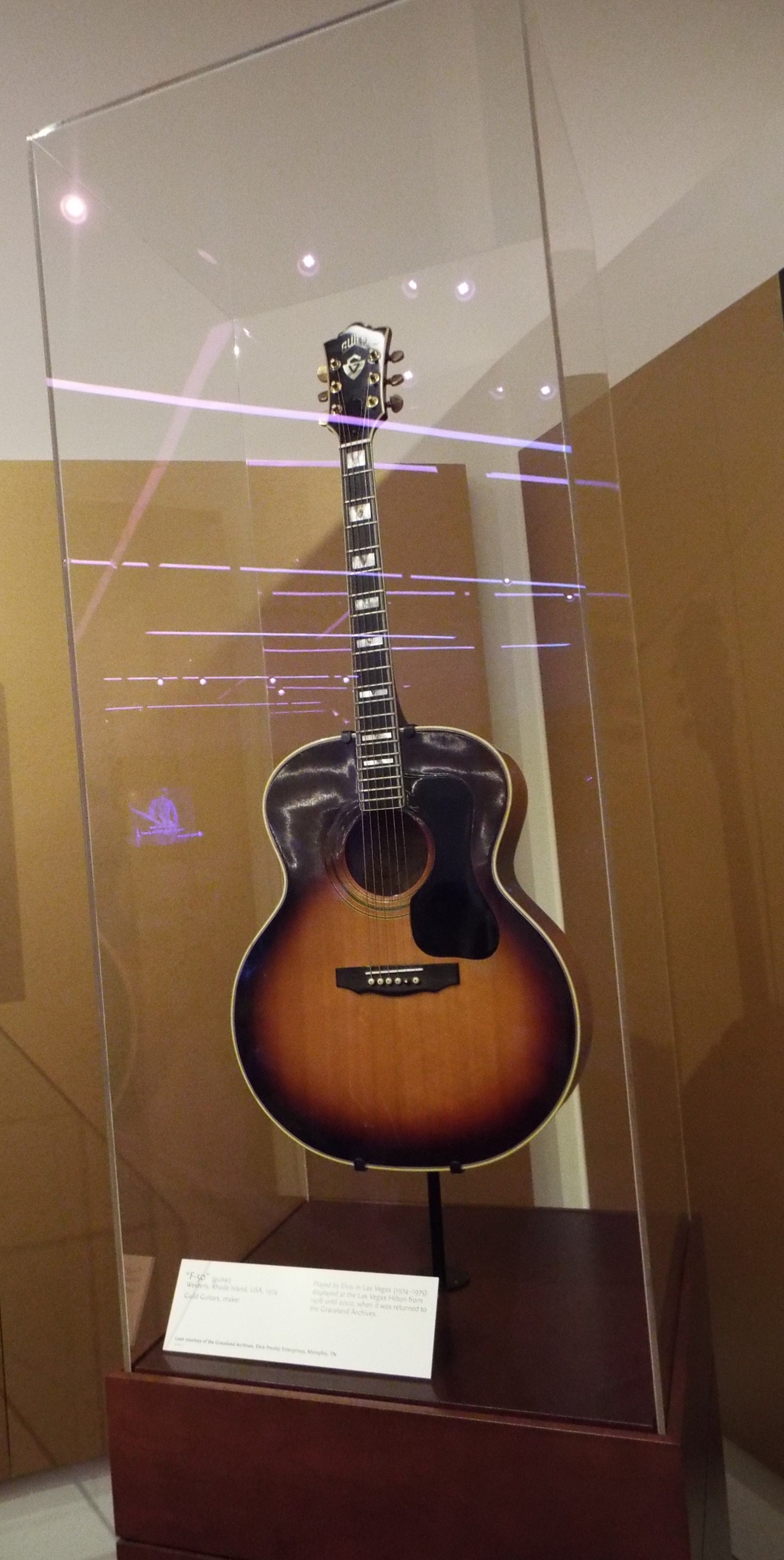
Elvis Presley's guitar.

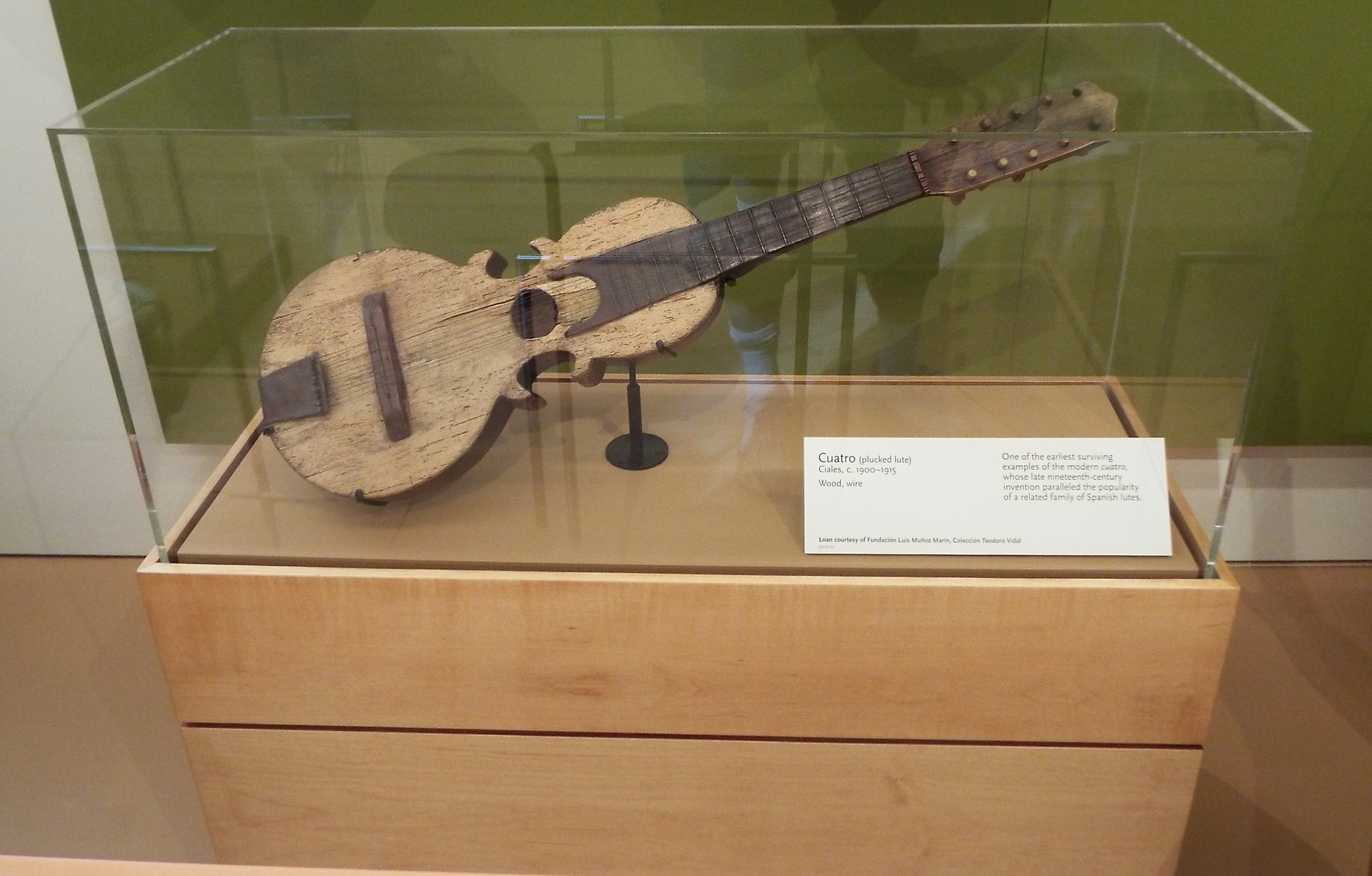
A Puerto Rican Cuatro.

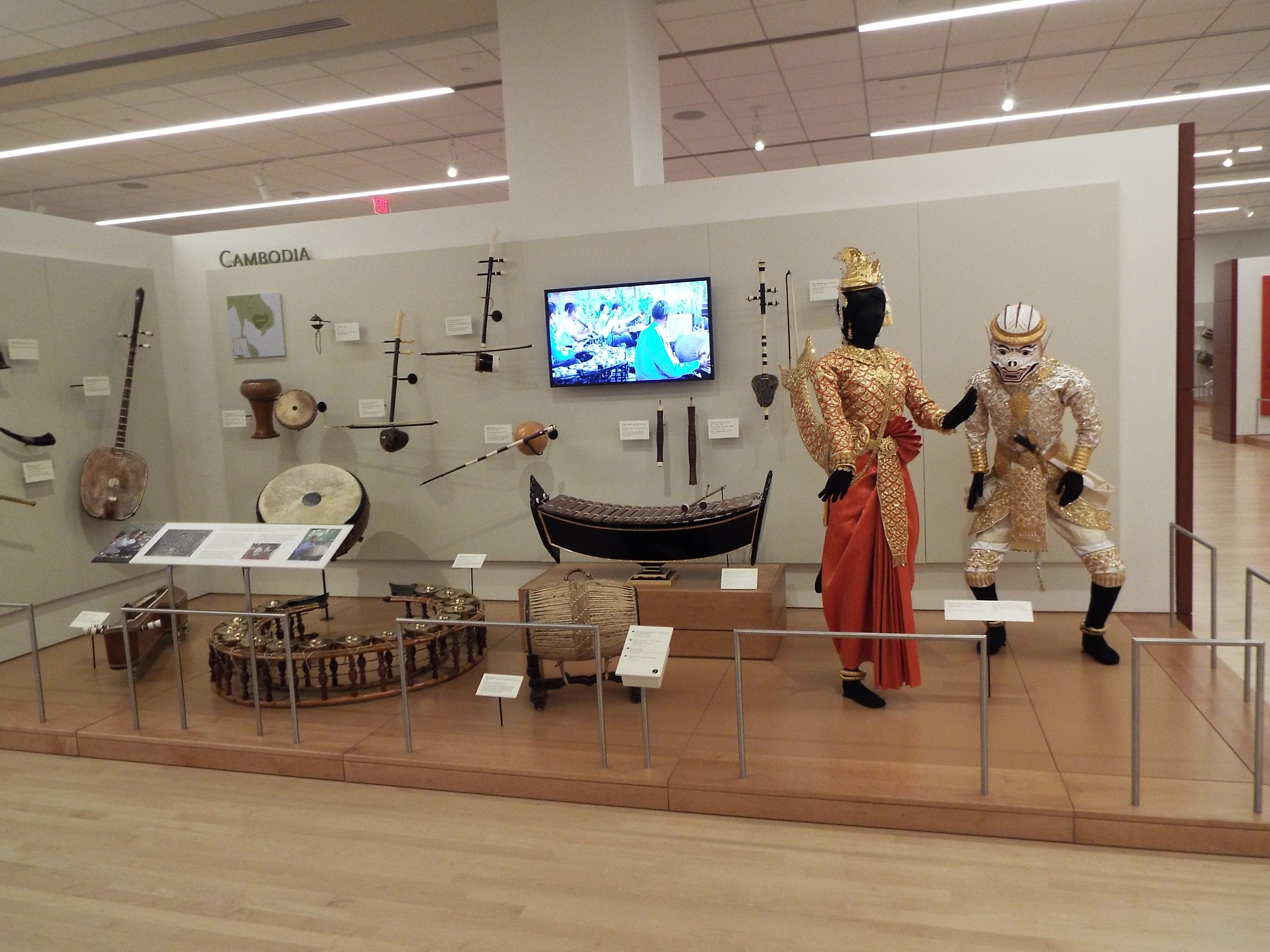
Cambodia exhibit.

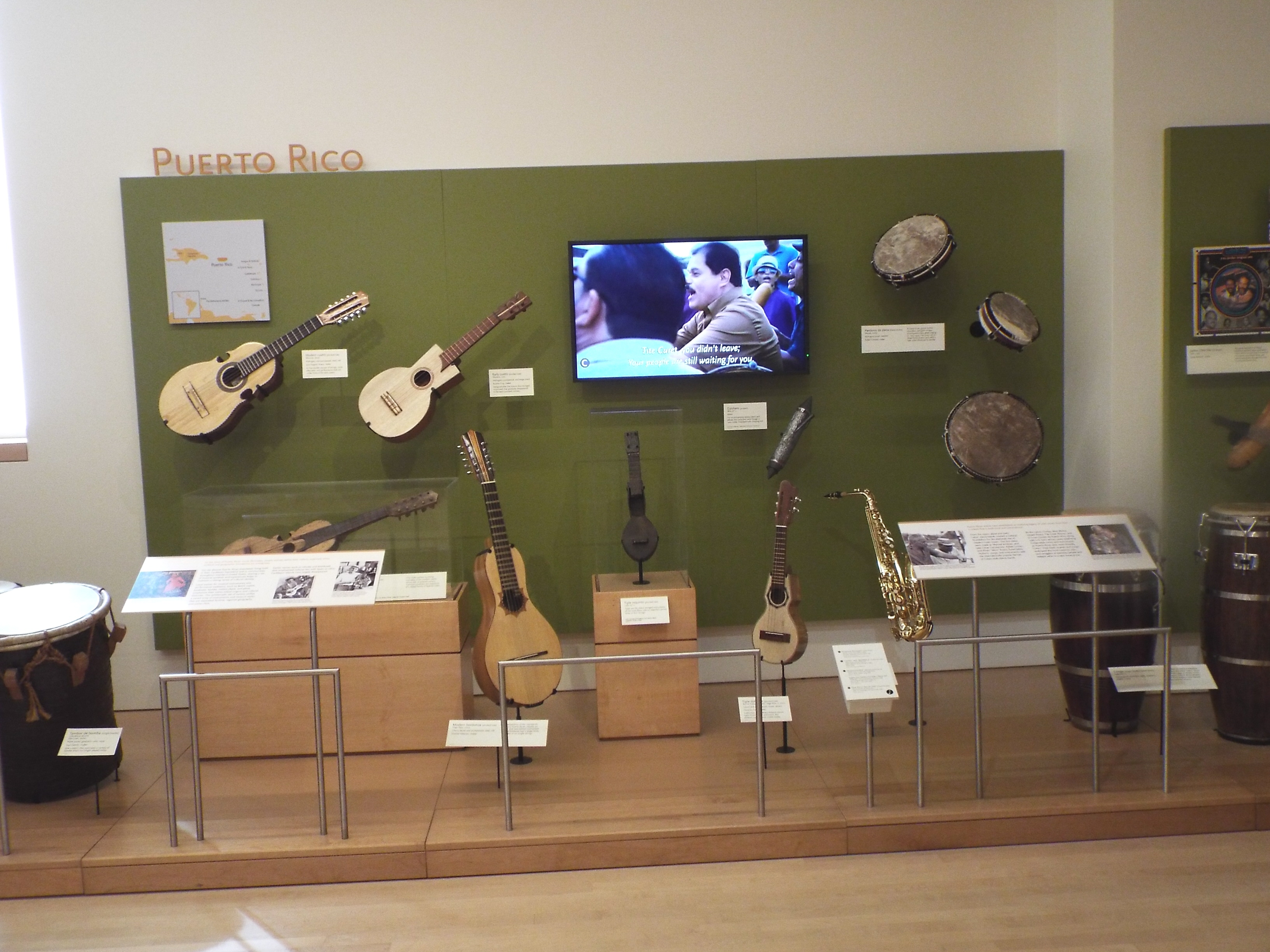
Puerto Rico exhibit.

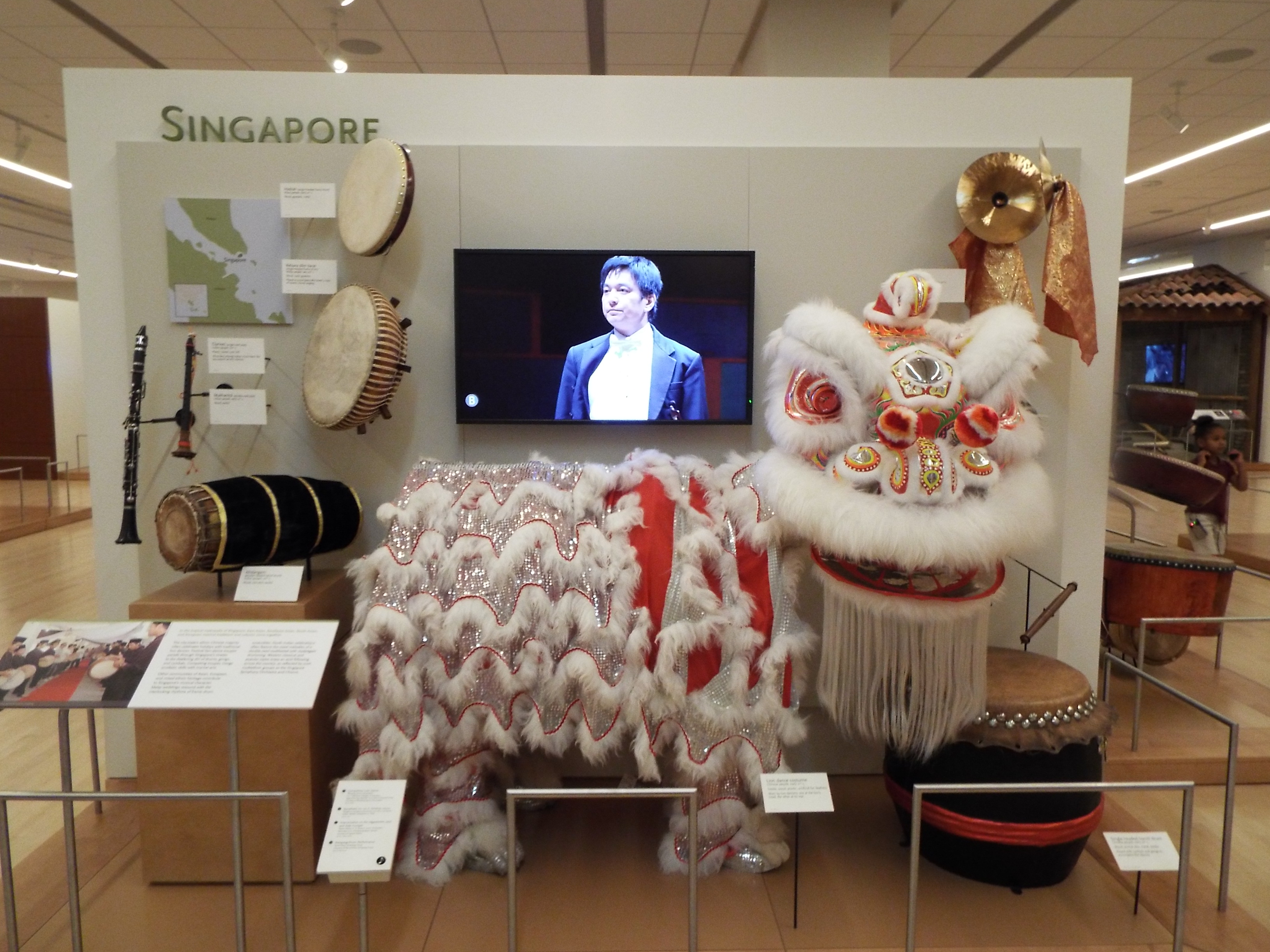
Singapore exhibit.

== Laveen ==
Laveen, an urban village within the city of Phoenix, which was first settled by farmers and dairymen in 1884. In the early 1900s, Walter E. Laveen and his family homesteaded an area encompassing all four corners of present-day 51st Avenue and Dobbins Road, where they also built the area's first general store – the Laveen Store – on the southeast corner. Two properties in Laveen are listed in the National Register of Historic Places.

Historic Laveen, Arizona

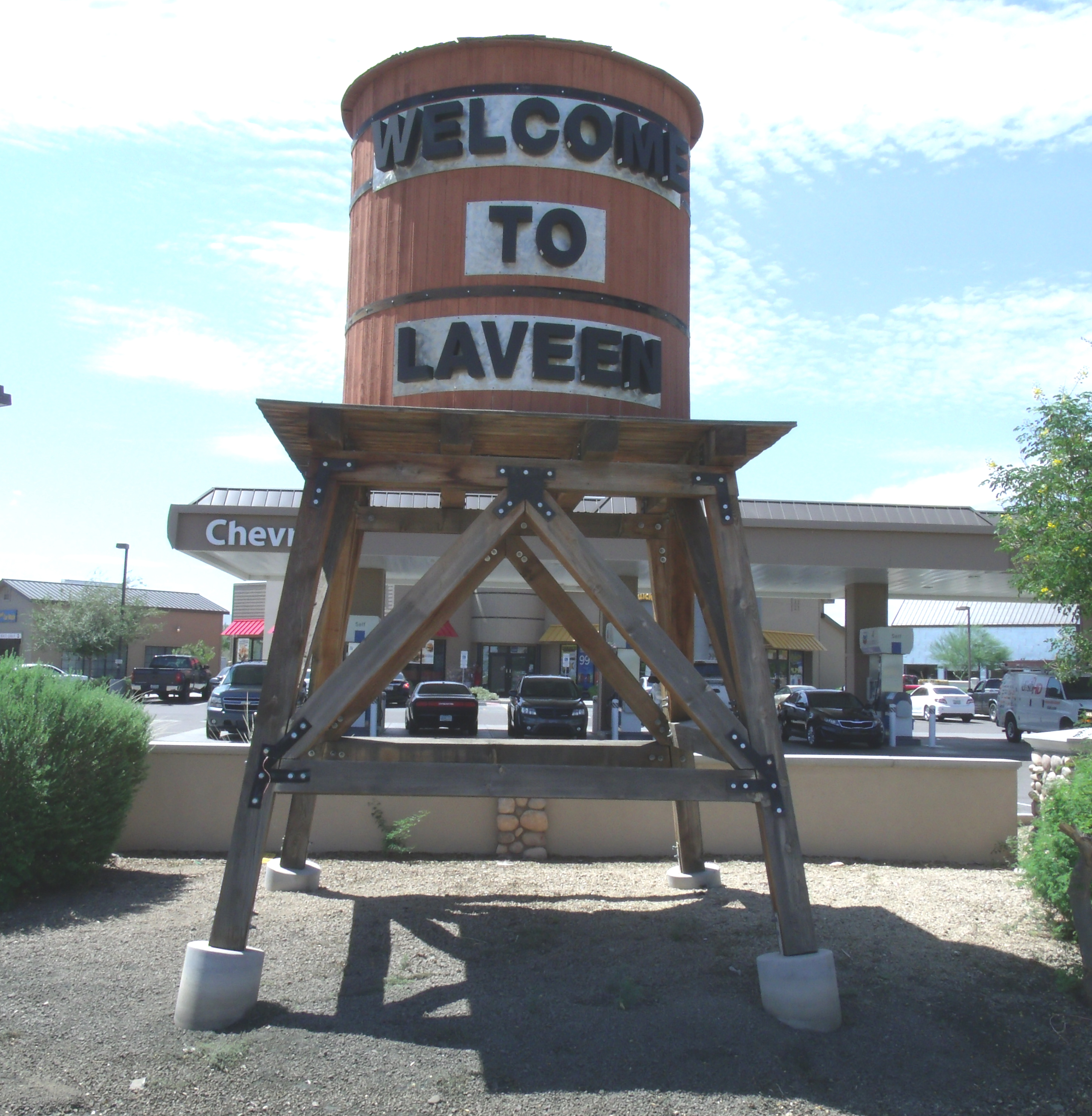
Laveen Village welcoming water tower

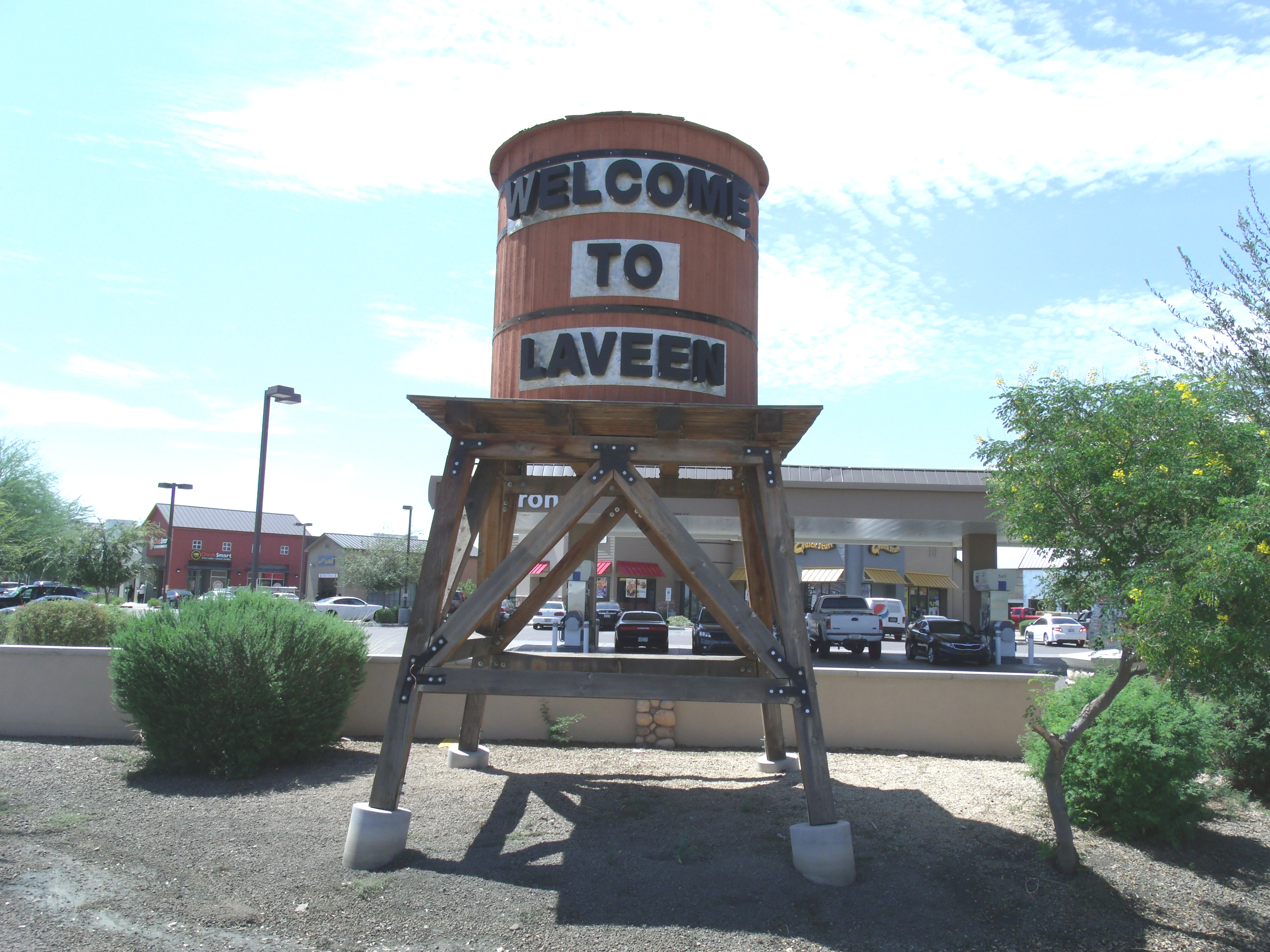
Different view of the Laveen Village welcoming water tower.

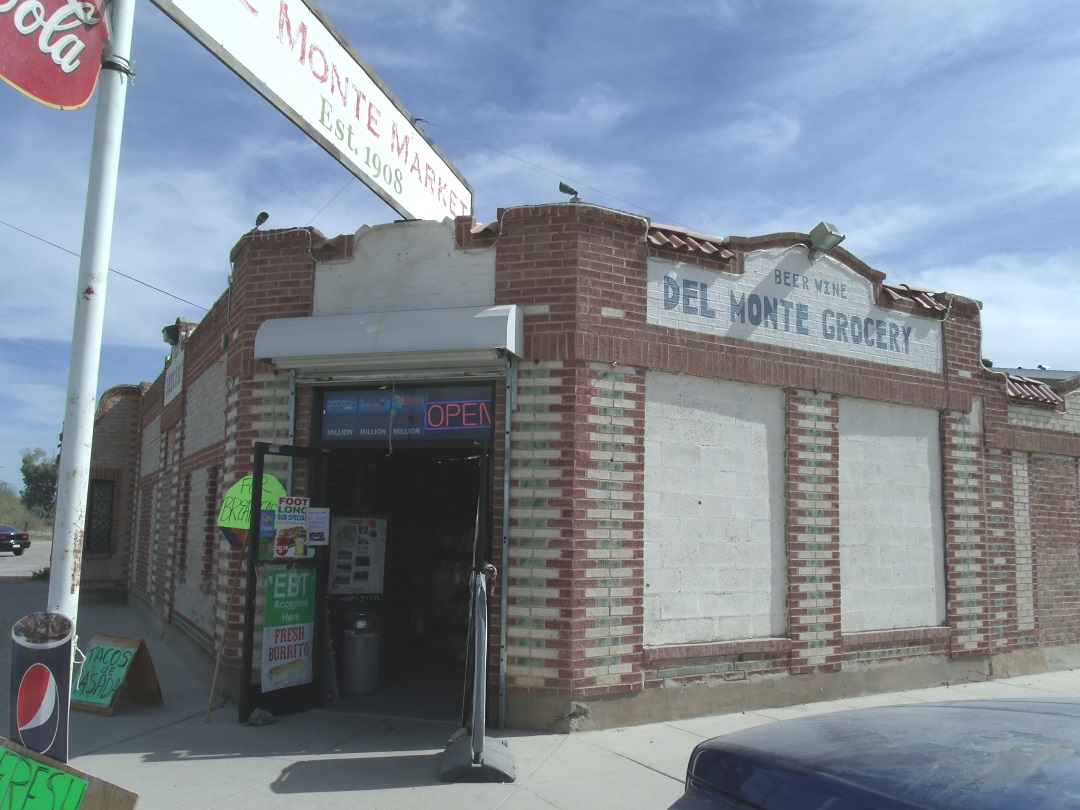
The Del Monte Market built in 1908 and located at 2659 W. Dobbins Road in South Phoenix. It is the oldest continuously operating market in the state. Designated as a landmark with Historic Preservation-Landmark (HP-L) overlay zoning (Phoenix Historic Property Register).

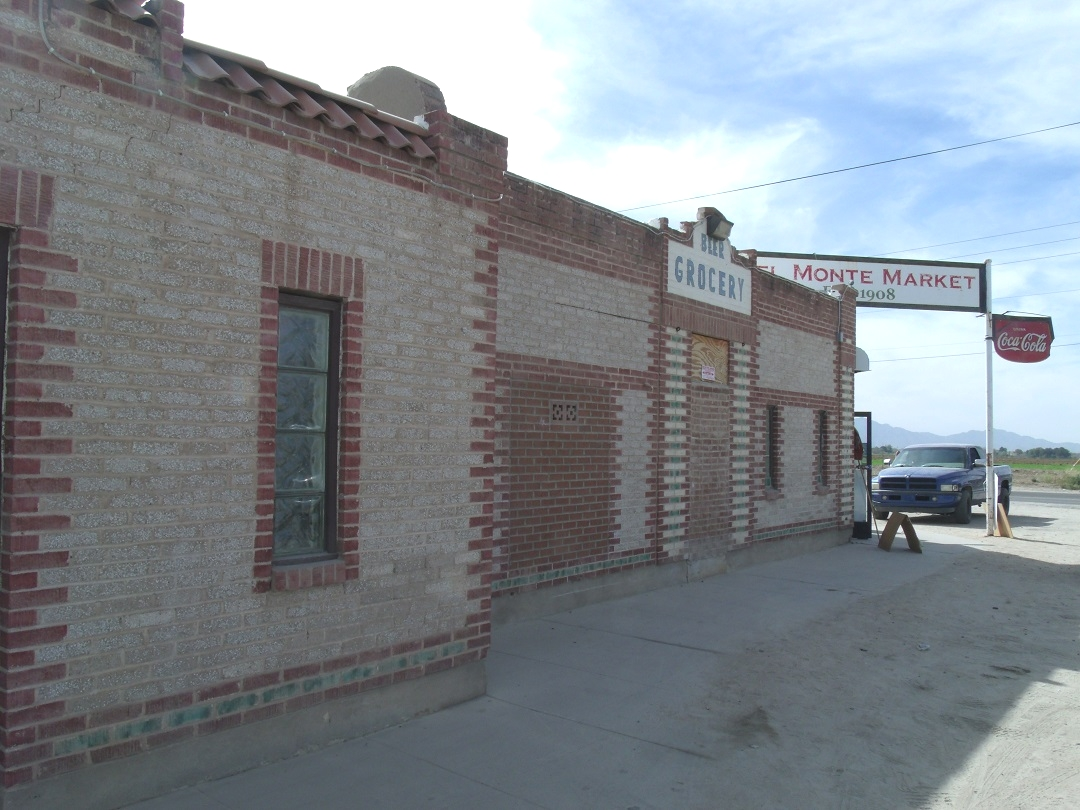
Different view of Del Monte Market.

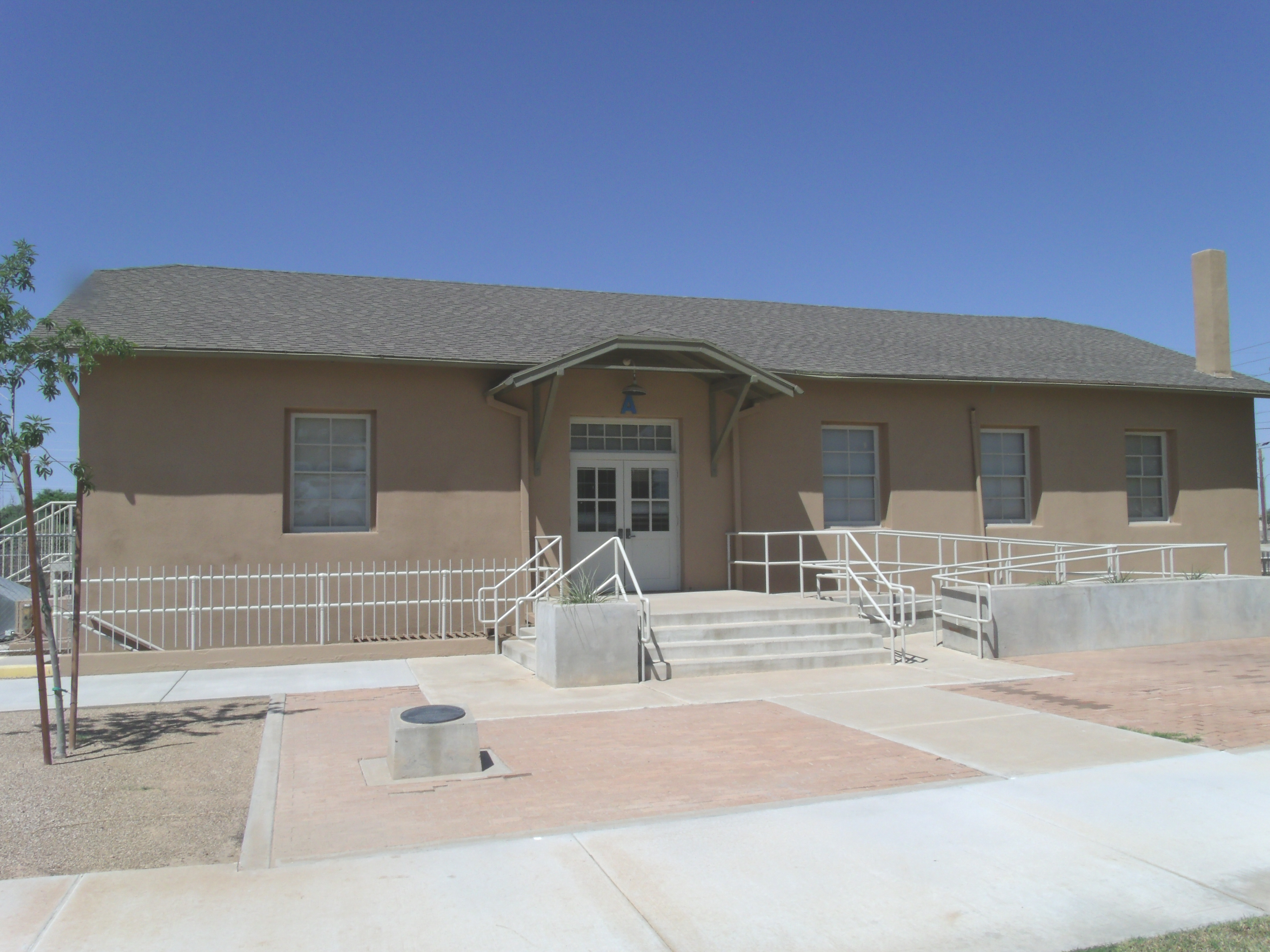
The Laveen School Auditorium was built in 1925 and is located at 5001 W. Dobbins Road. The building was listed in the National Register of Historic Places on August 30, 2011, reference #88001601.

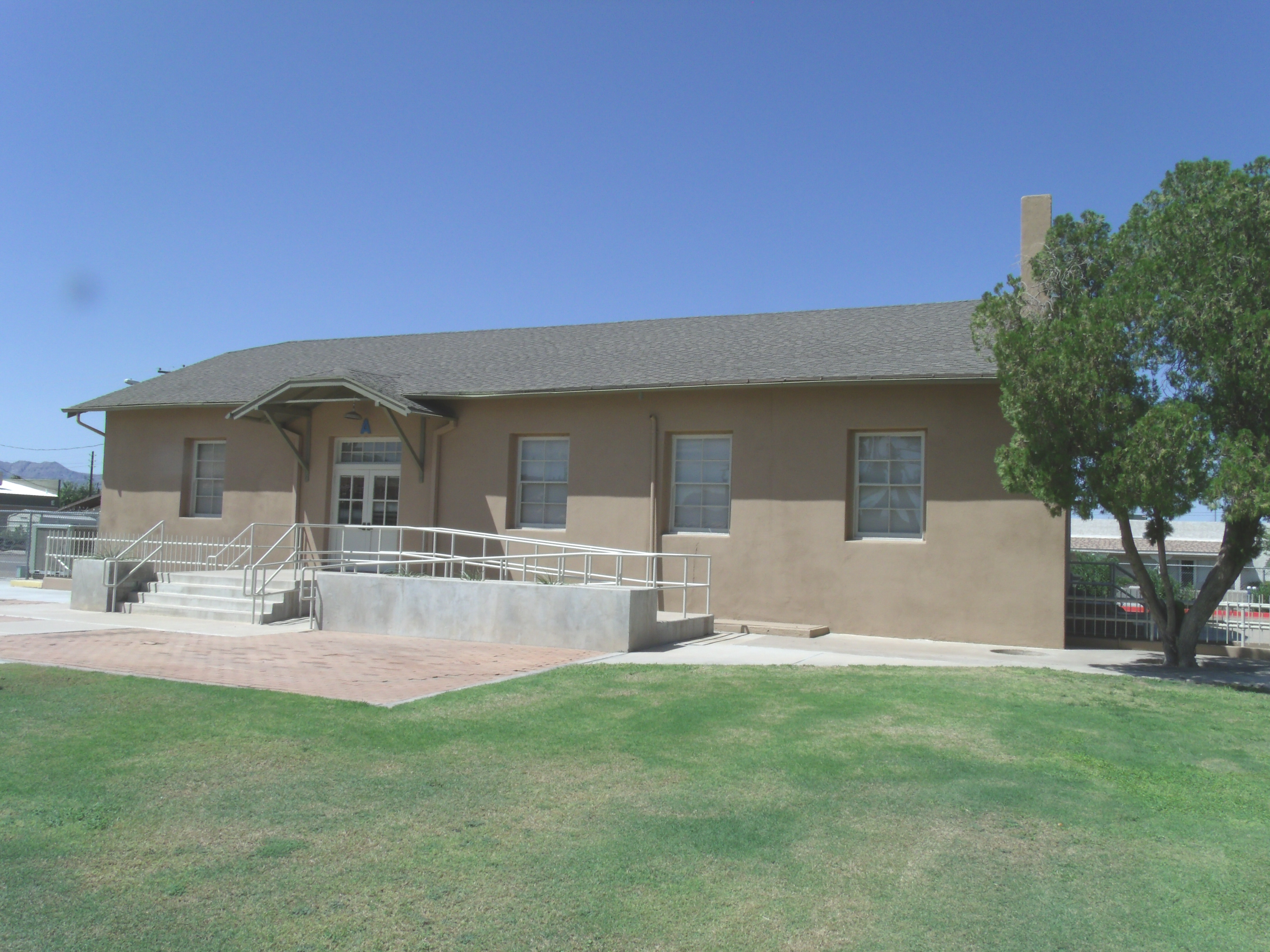
Different view of the Laveen School Auditorium.

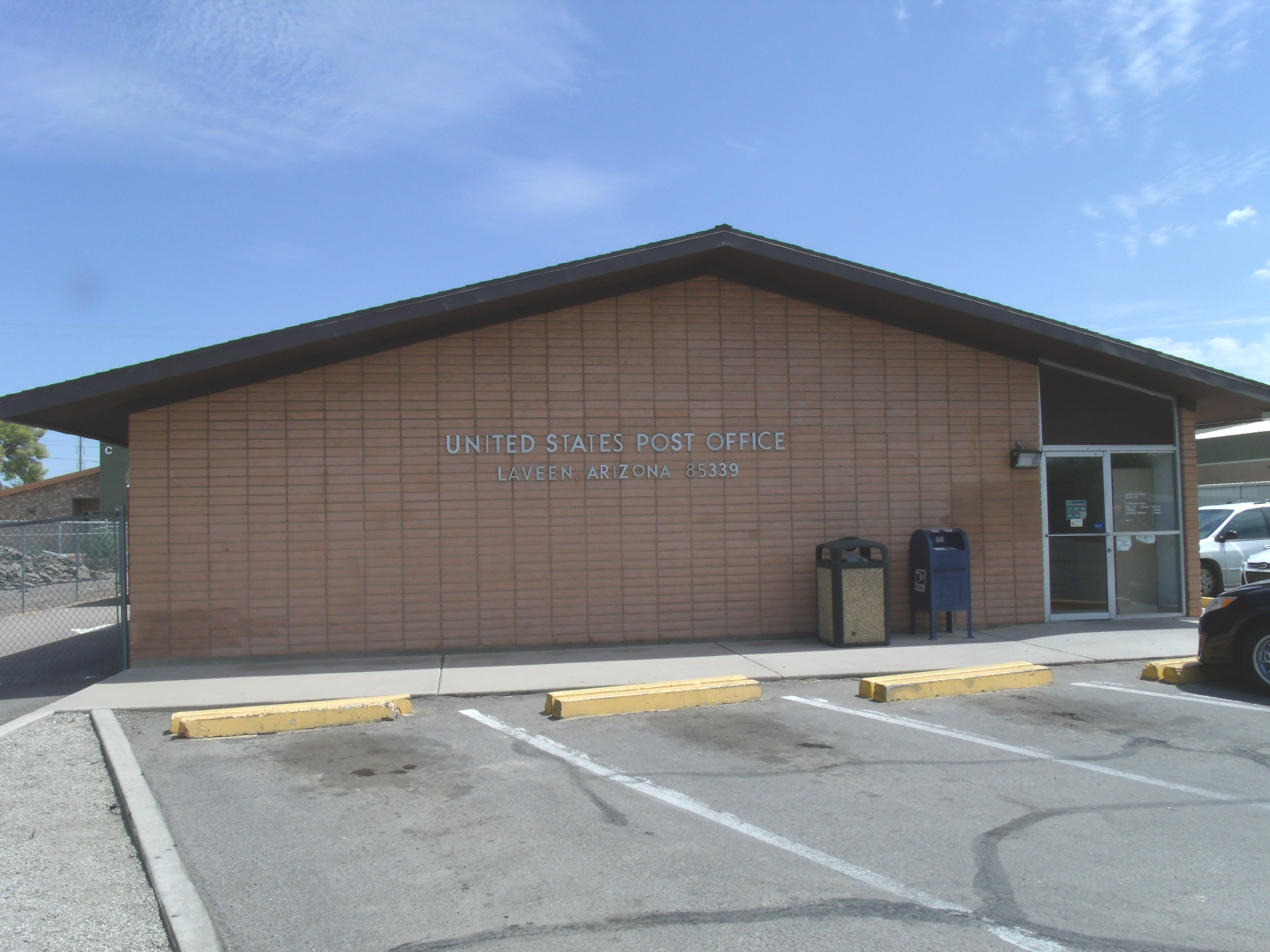
The Laveen Post Office located in the corner of 51st Avenue and Dobbins Road. This is the located where the original Laveen Village post office was established in 1918.

== Sunnyslope District ==
The Sunnyslope community is a long-established cohesive neighborhood within the borders of the city of Phoenix. It has its own "small town" identity and a sense of place that is a point of pride embraced by community members. Sunnyslope has attempted to be incorporated as its own town on four occasions but failed every time. In 1959 the City of Phoenix annexed the community of Sunnyslope. Most of the structures of historic significance have been razed.

Historic Sunnyslope District

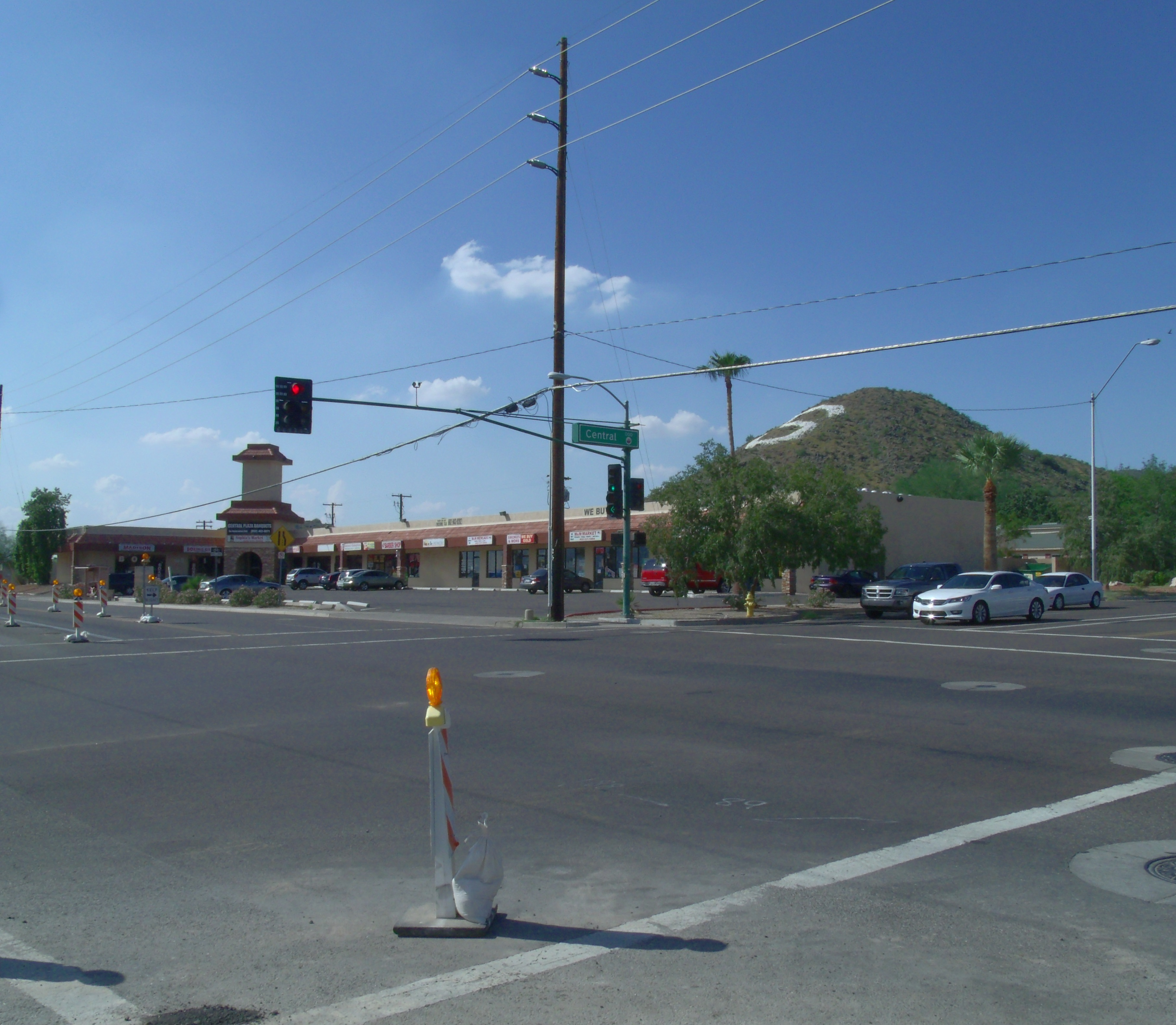
Intersection of Central Avenue and Hatcher Road in Sunnyslope

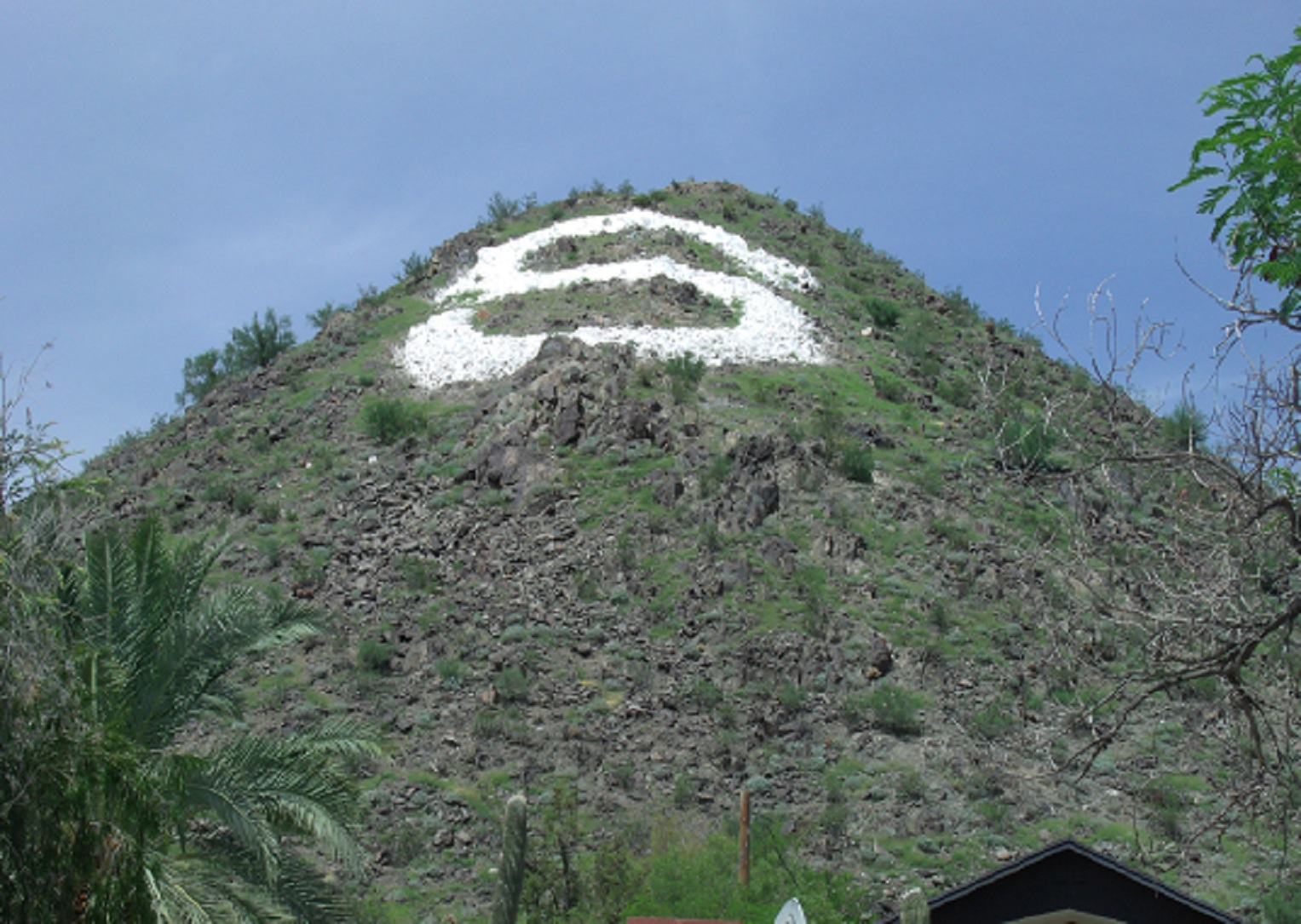
Sunnyslope Mountain, a.k.a. "S" Mountain. In December 1954, various students from Sunnyslope High School painted an "S" on the mountain which now is in the Phoenix Historic Property Register. It is located near Central Avenue and Hatcher Street. The mountain was listed in the Phoenix Historic Property Register in October 2011.

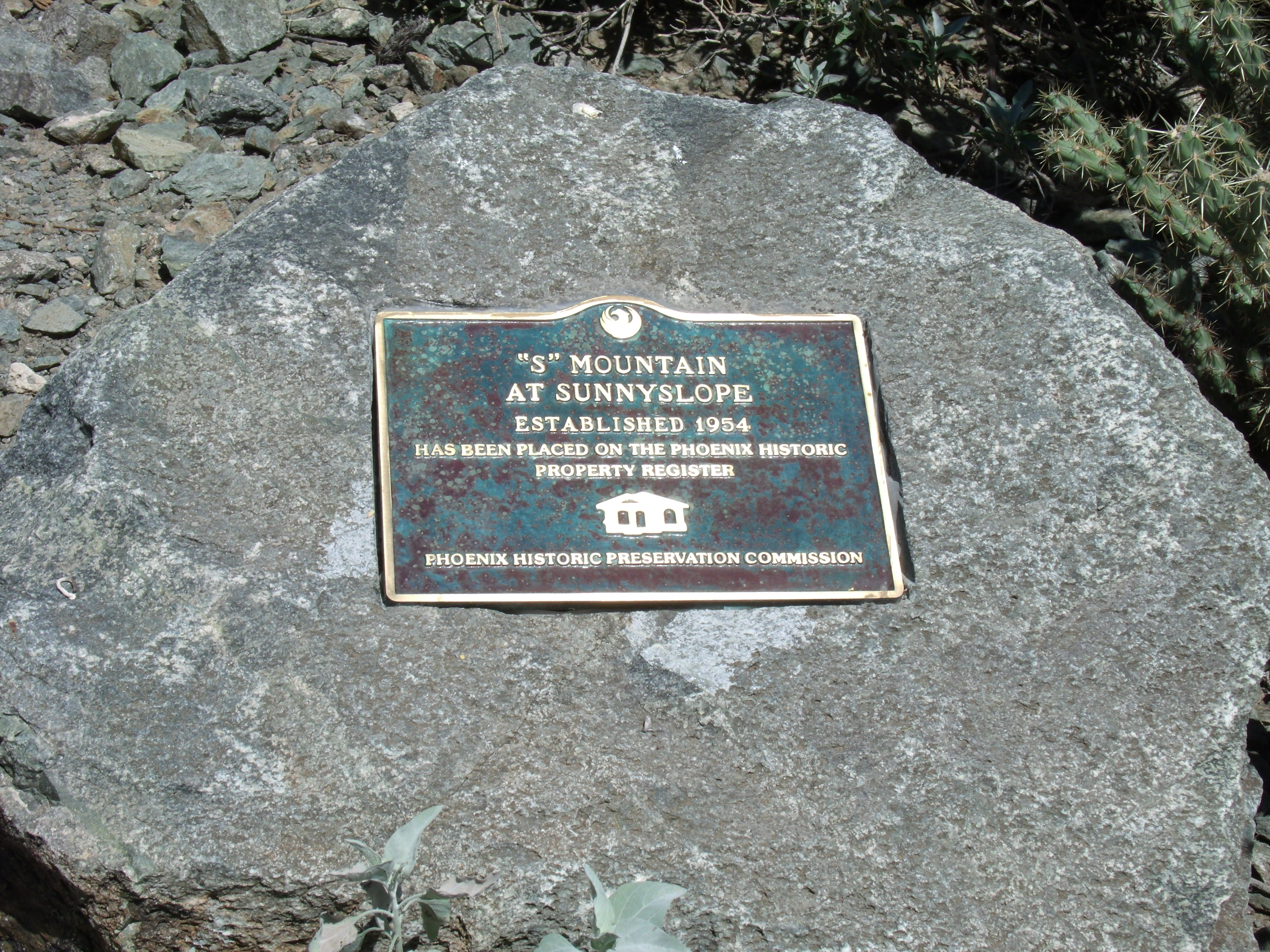
This is where the trail which leads to the "S" of the historic Sunnyslope Mountain begins.

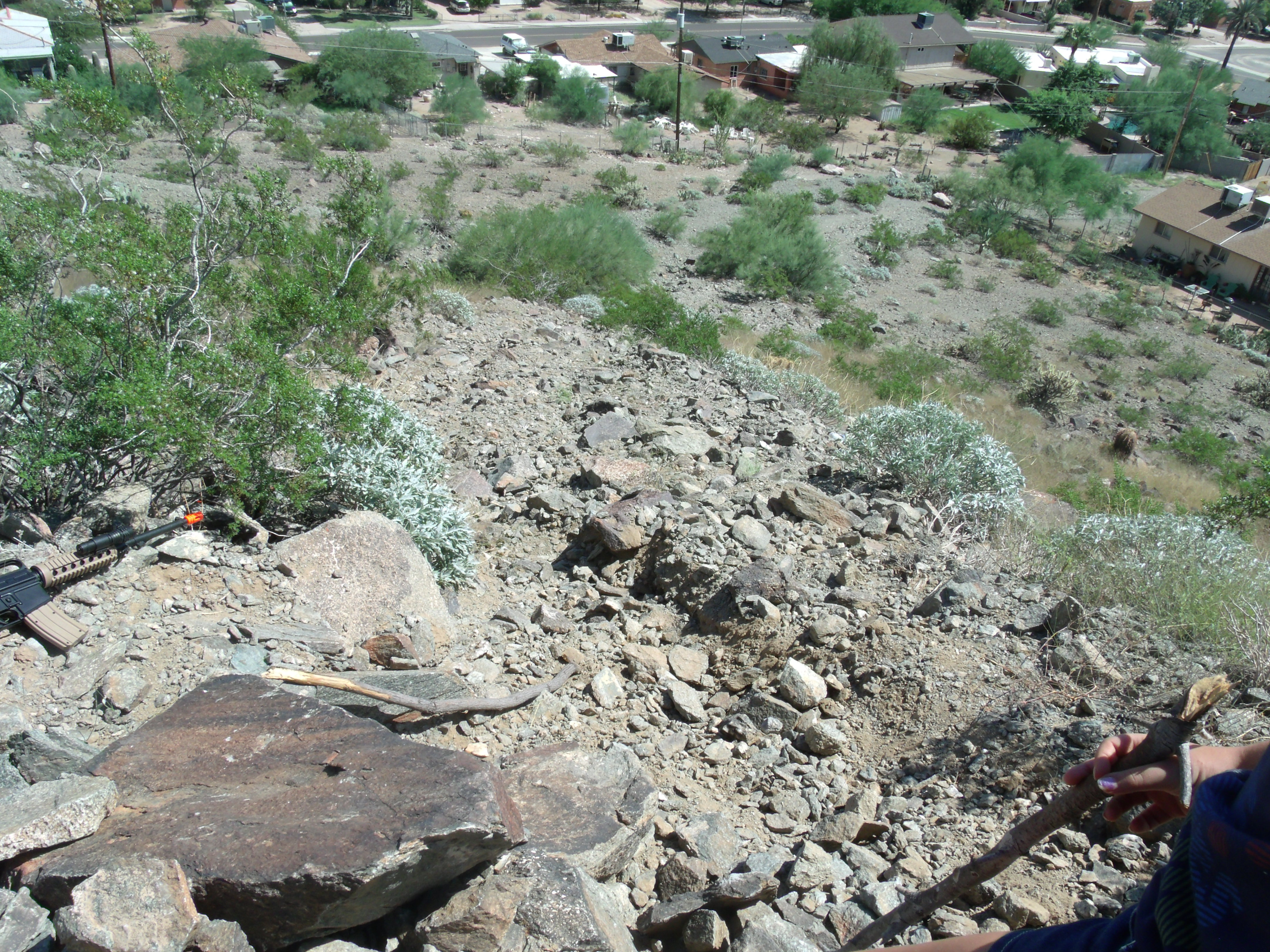
This is a view from the trail which leads to the "S' of Sunnyslope Mountain

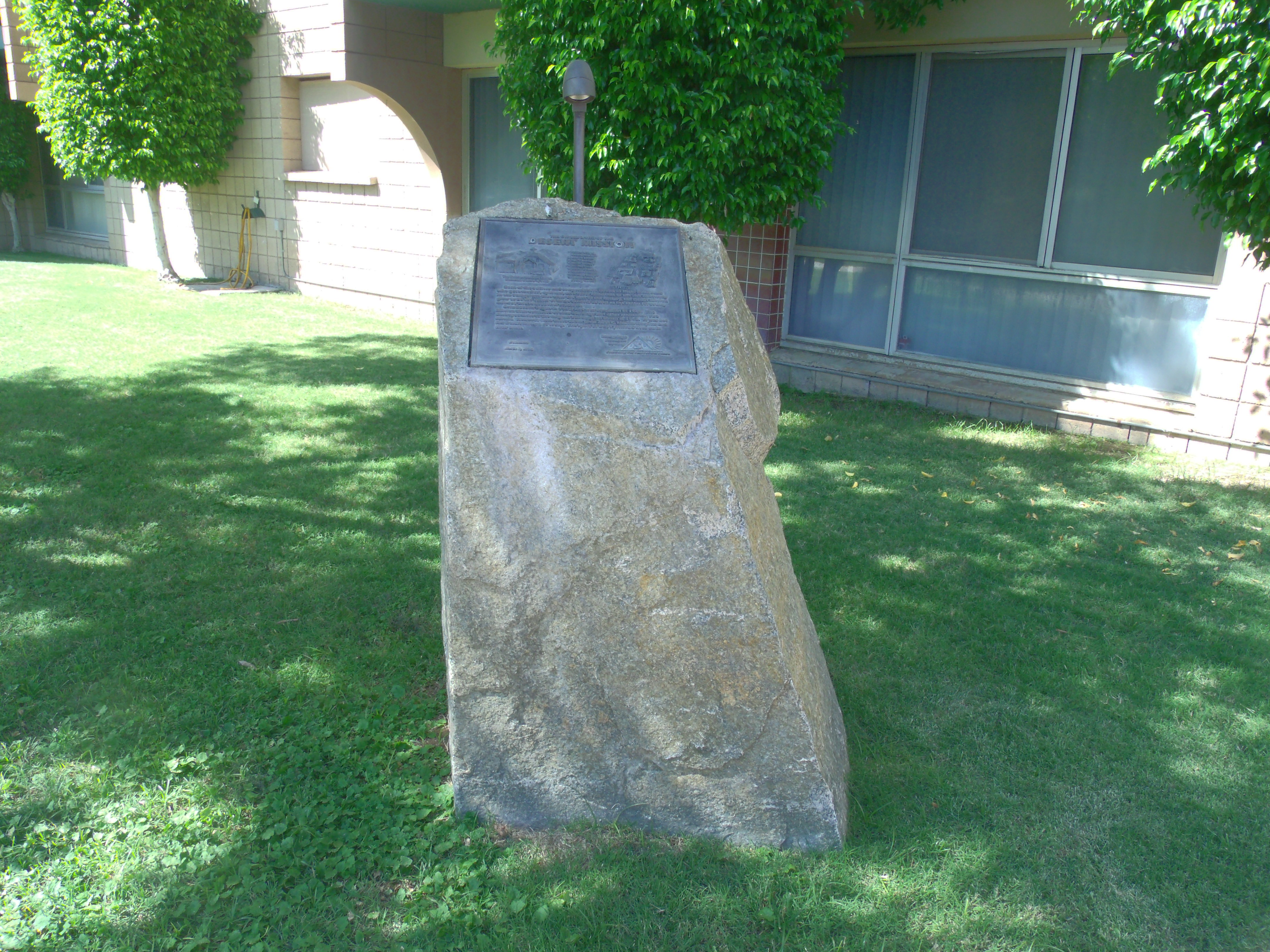
This is where the historic Desert Mission of Sunnyslope was founded. The area in which the Desert Mission was located at 5th Street and Eva Road and its area consisted less than an acre in size. It served the community from 1927 to 1940. A plaque marking the historical site, commissioned by the Sunnyslope Historical Society and the John C. Lincoln Hospital, was placed on this site on March 7, 1992.

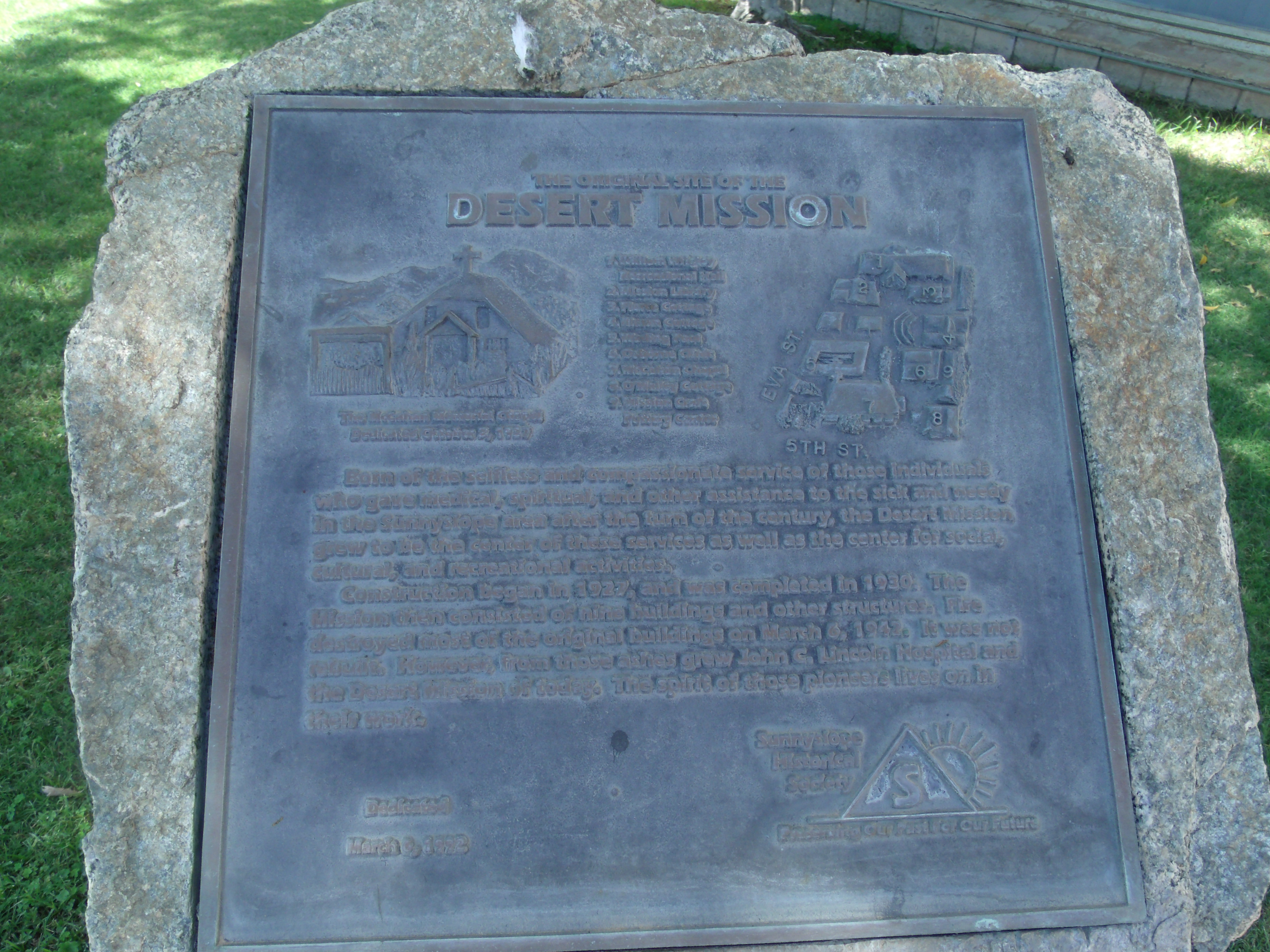
This Marker was placed on the site where the historic Desert Mission of Sunnyslope was founded in 1927. It is located on 5th Street and Eva Road, Sunnyslope, Phoenix.

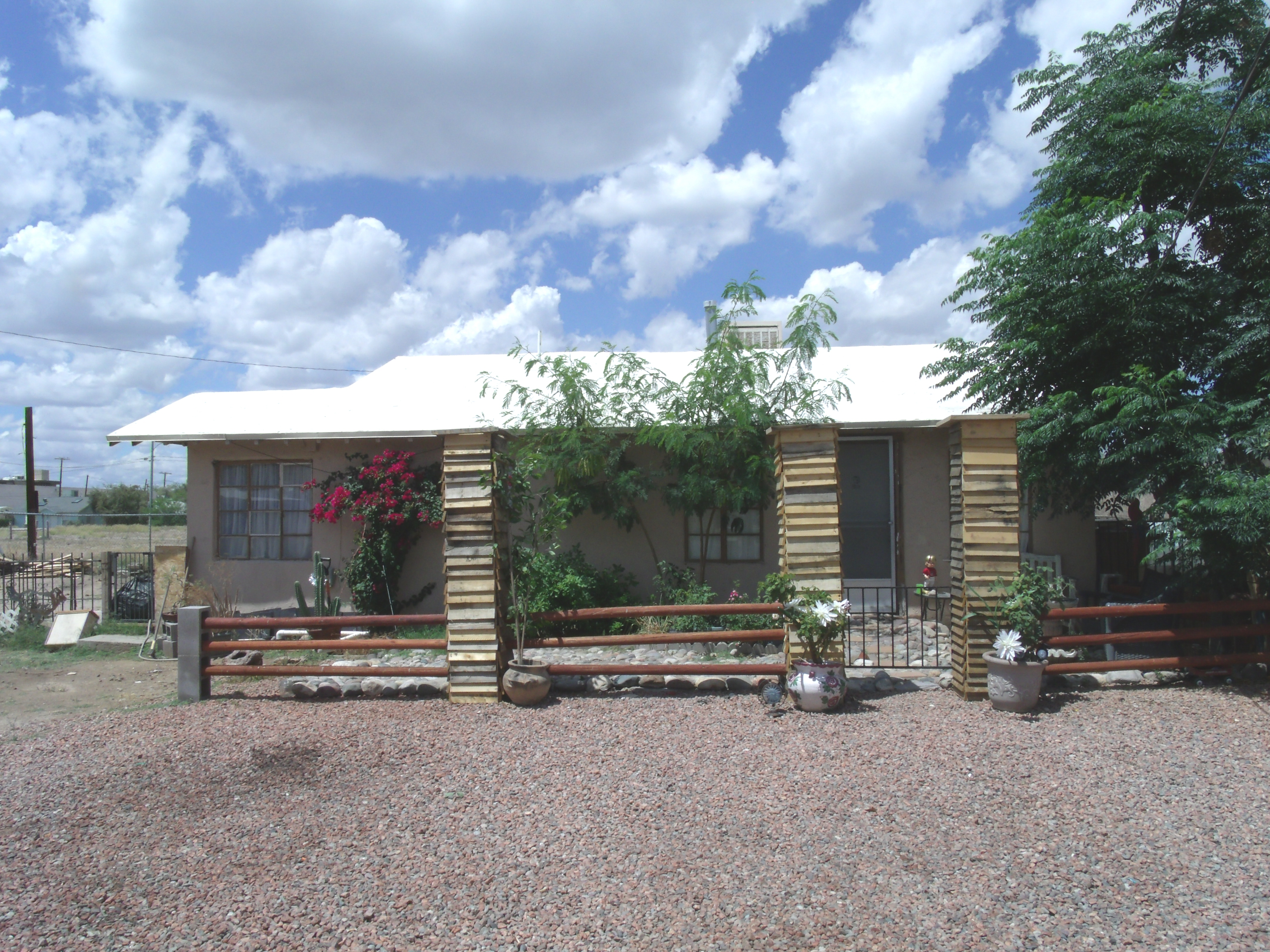
One of the low rent cabins of what once known as Beatty's Court on Ruth Street was built in the 1940s. The Elizabeth Beatty Cabins were provided to families suffering from tuberculosis. Beatty was a retired secretary who moved to Sunnyslope in 1918. She inherited land between Ruth St. and Central Avenue where she established the low rent cabins

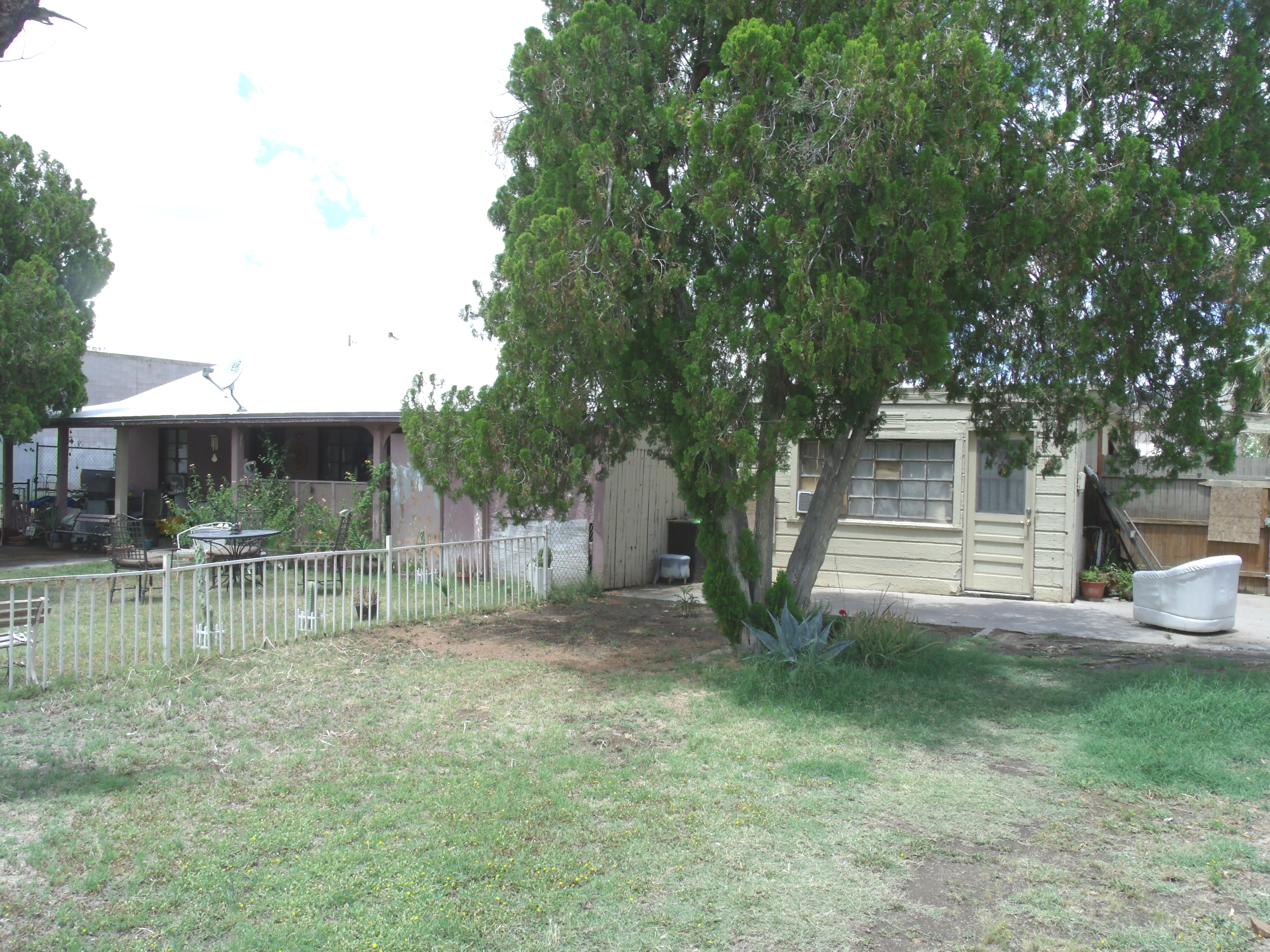
Beatty Court Cabins on Ruth Street built in the 1930s and 40s.

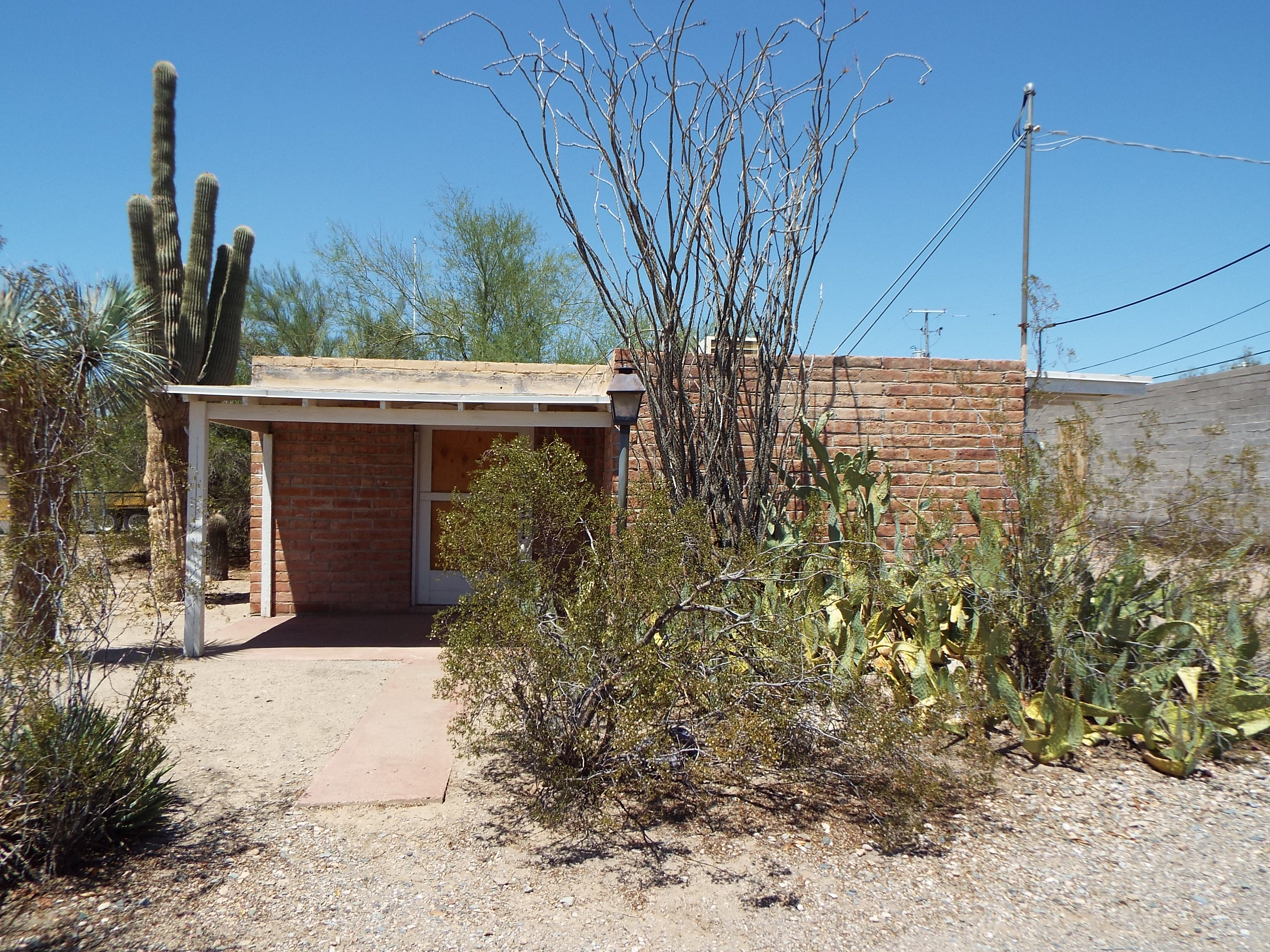
The Sage Press Building was built in 1935 and is located at 1457 E. Peoria Avenue (corner of Cave Creek Road). Sage was Sunnyslope's first newspaper. Lillian Stough was the editor and Charles Stough the promoter.

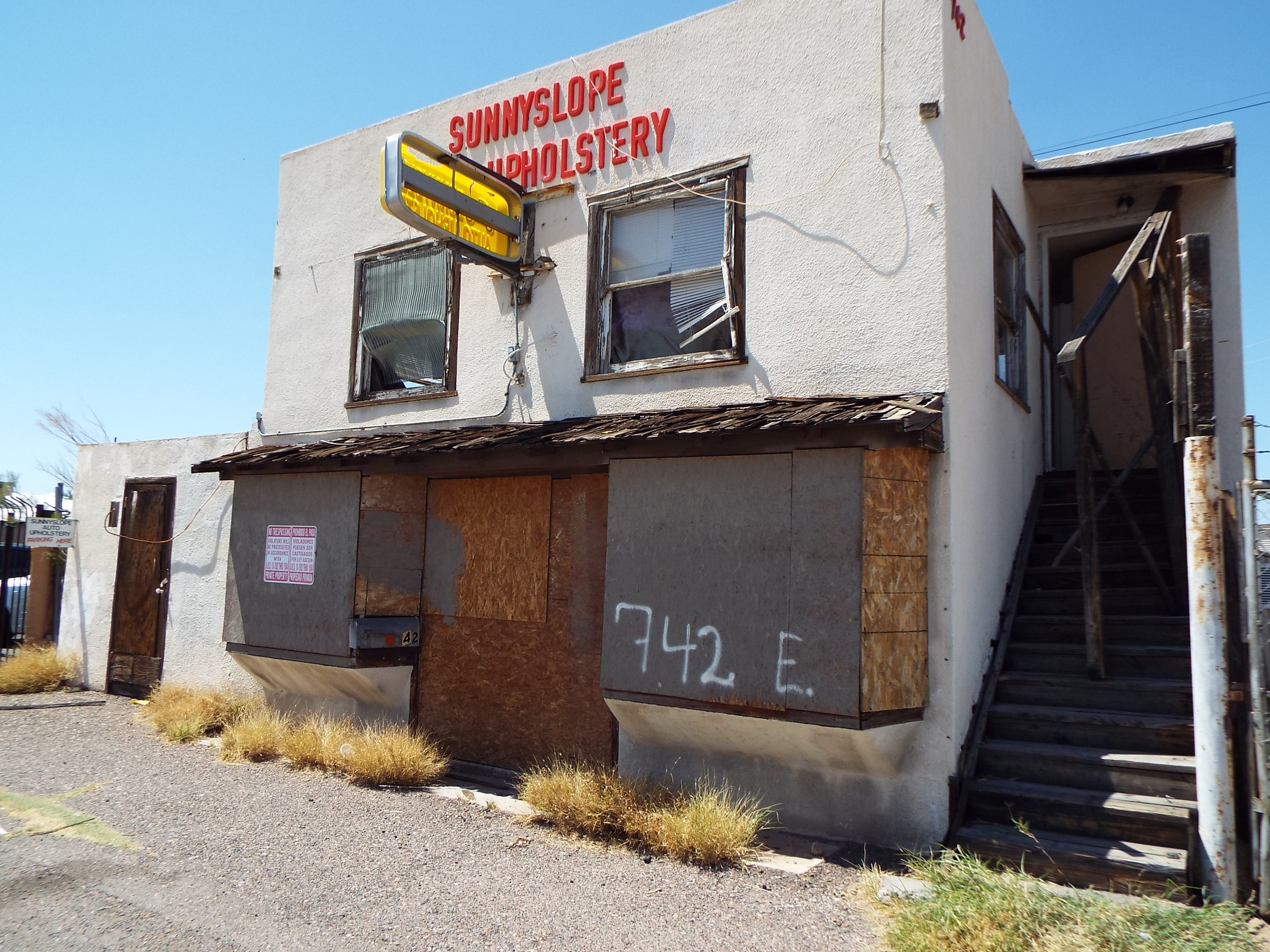
The Abandoned Sunnyslope Auto Upholstery Building, located at 742 E. Dunlap Avenue, was built in 1940.

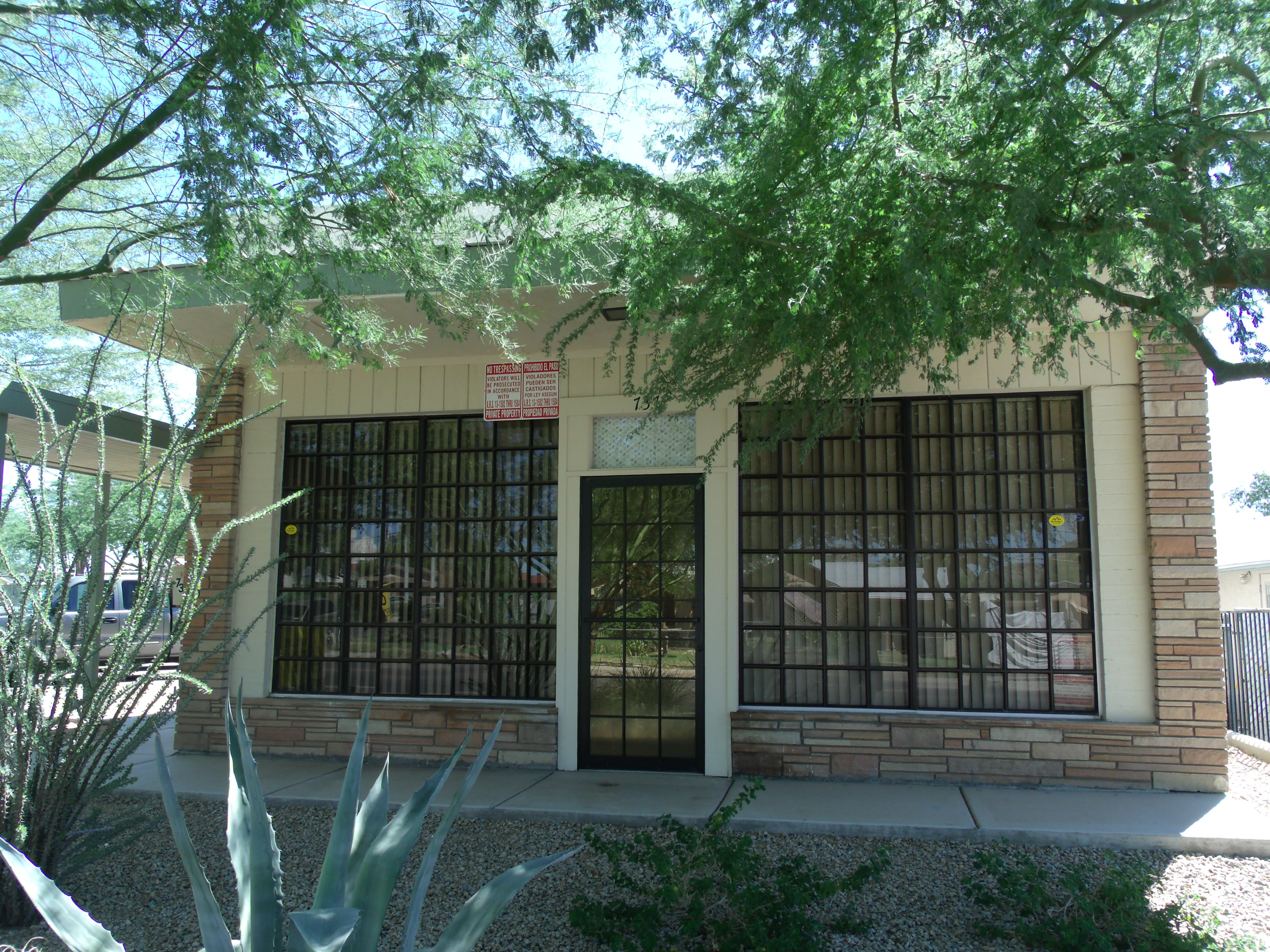
This historic building once housed "Peoples Drug Store". This structure was built c. 1940s and was originally located at 111 East Dunlap Avenue. Pharmacist Bob Rice established his pharmacy there and in 1953 installed what was the first pharmacy drive through window in Arizona and the fifth in all the nation. The building was moved in 1999, to 737 E. Hatcher Road, Phoenix its current location and currently is the home of the Sunnyslope Historical Society and Museum.

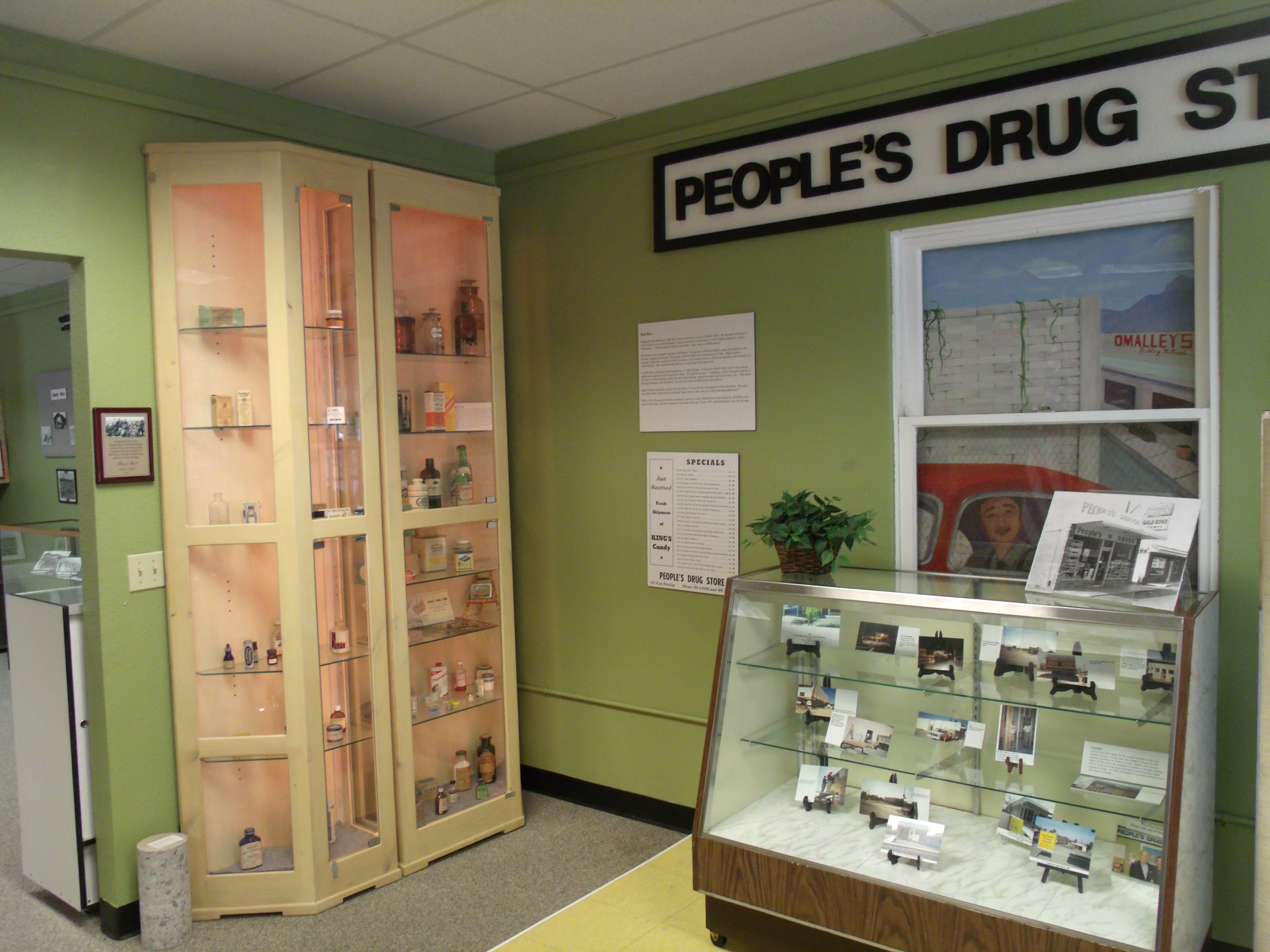
A display of pharmacy equipment is among the many displays in the Sunnyslope Historical Society and Museum. The Sunnyslope Historical Society and Museum are housed in what once was the historic "Peoples Drug Store" building.

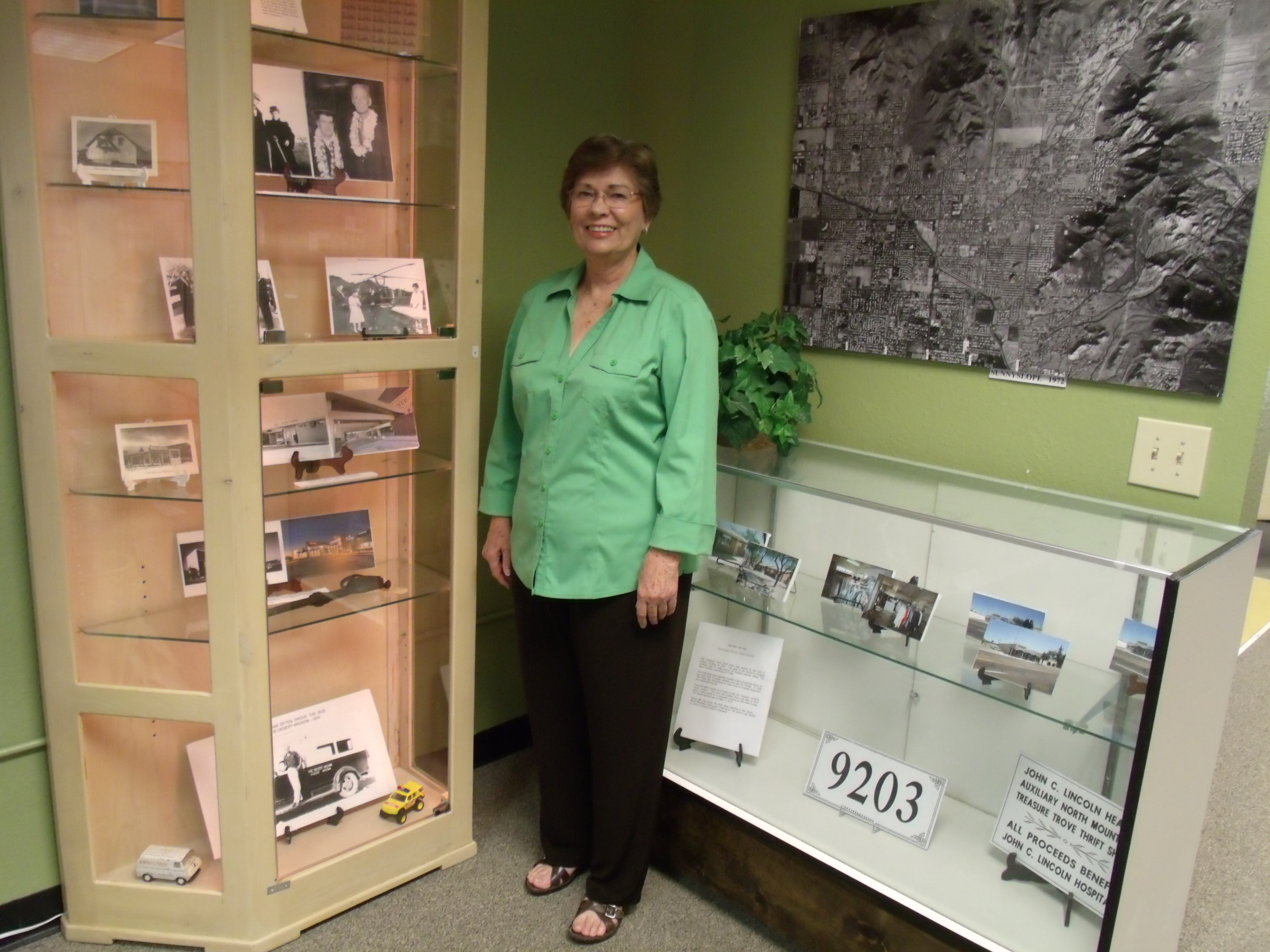
Dorothy Gunderson, of the Sunnyslope Historical Society and Museum, poses in front of the John C. Lincoln display in the historical building which once housed the "Peoples Drug Store".

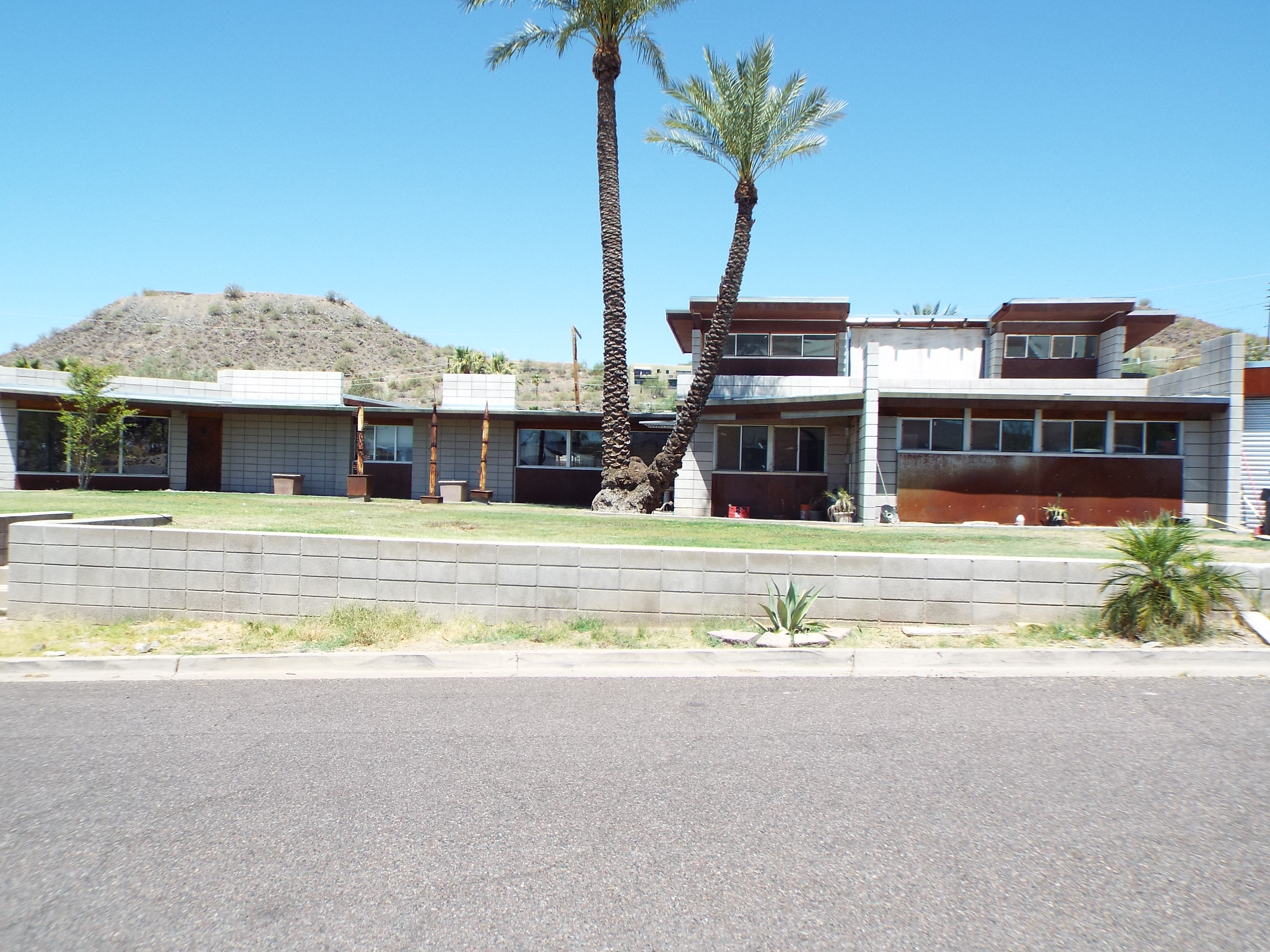
The Dr. Kenneth E. Hall house built in 1946 and located at 9840 N. 2nd. Street. Hall moved into the house in 1954 after some renovations were made.

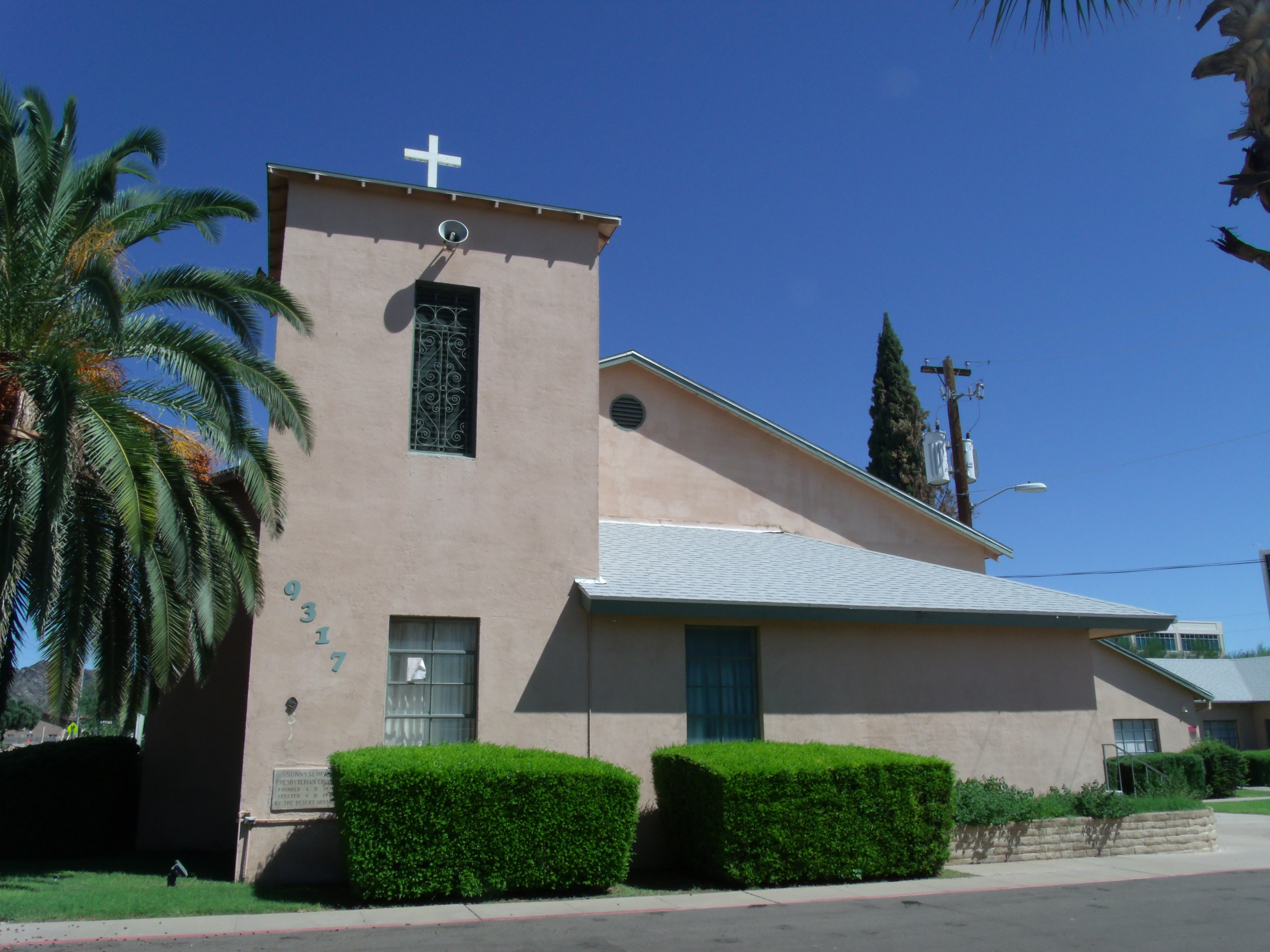
The Sunnyslope Presbyterian Church was founded in 1927 in Sunnyslope. The historic structure was built in 1949. It is located at 9317 N 2nd Street, in Sunnyslope.

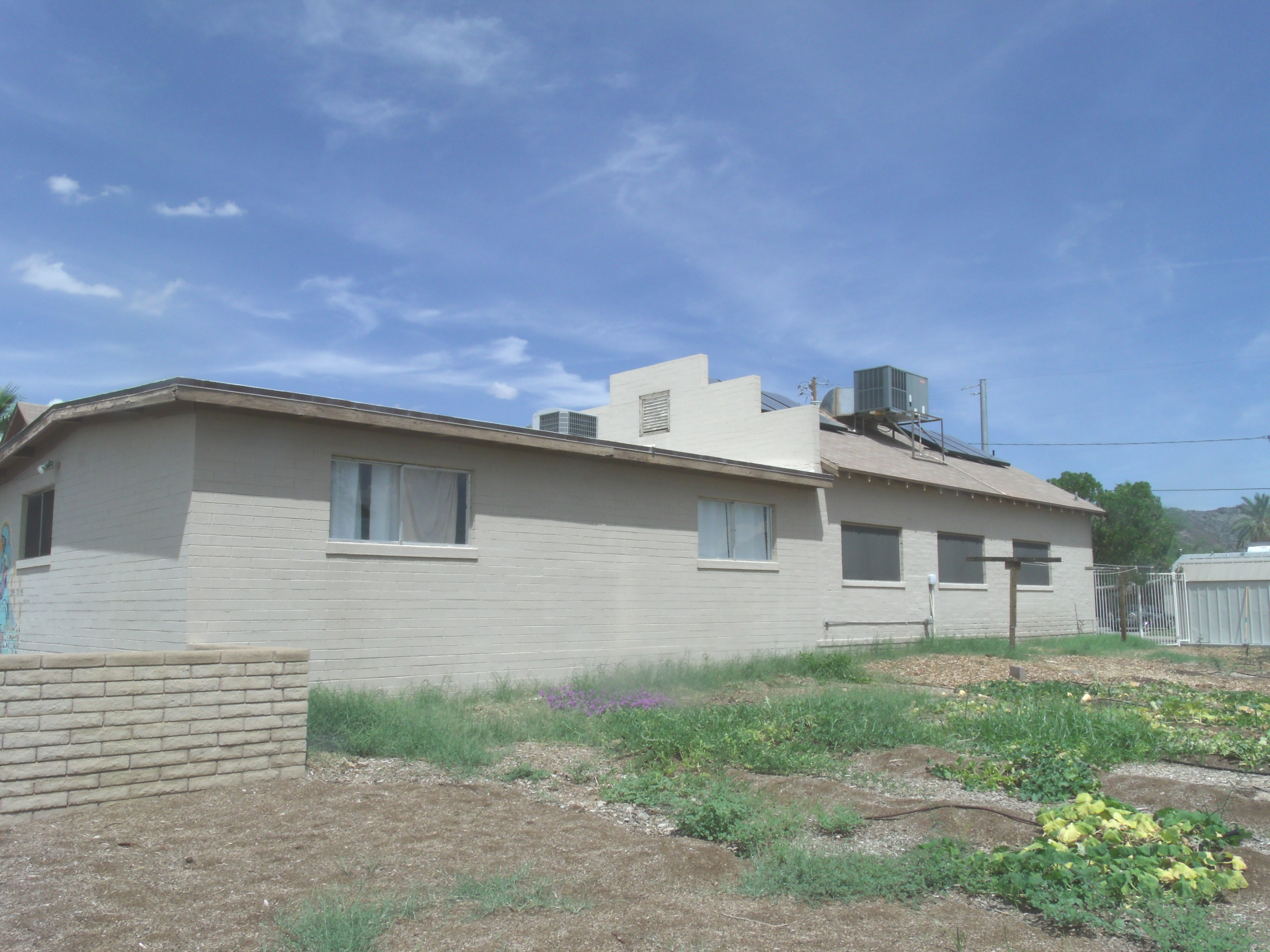
The historic Mennonite Church Meetinghouse was built in 1946 on 9835 N. 7th Street in what was then Sunnyslope an area which later became part of Phoenix. In 1949, a new church was erected beside it. The older building was then used as a Christian day school and Sunday school.

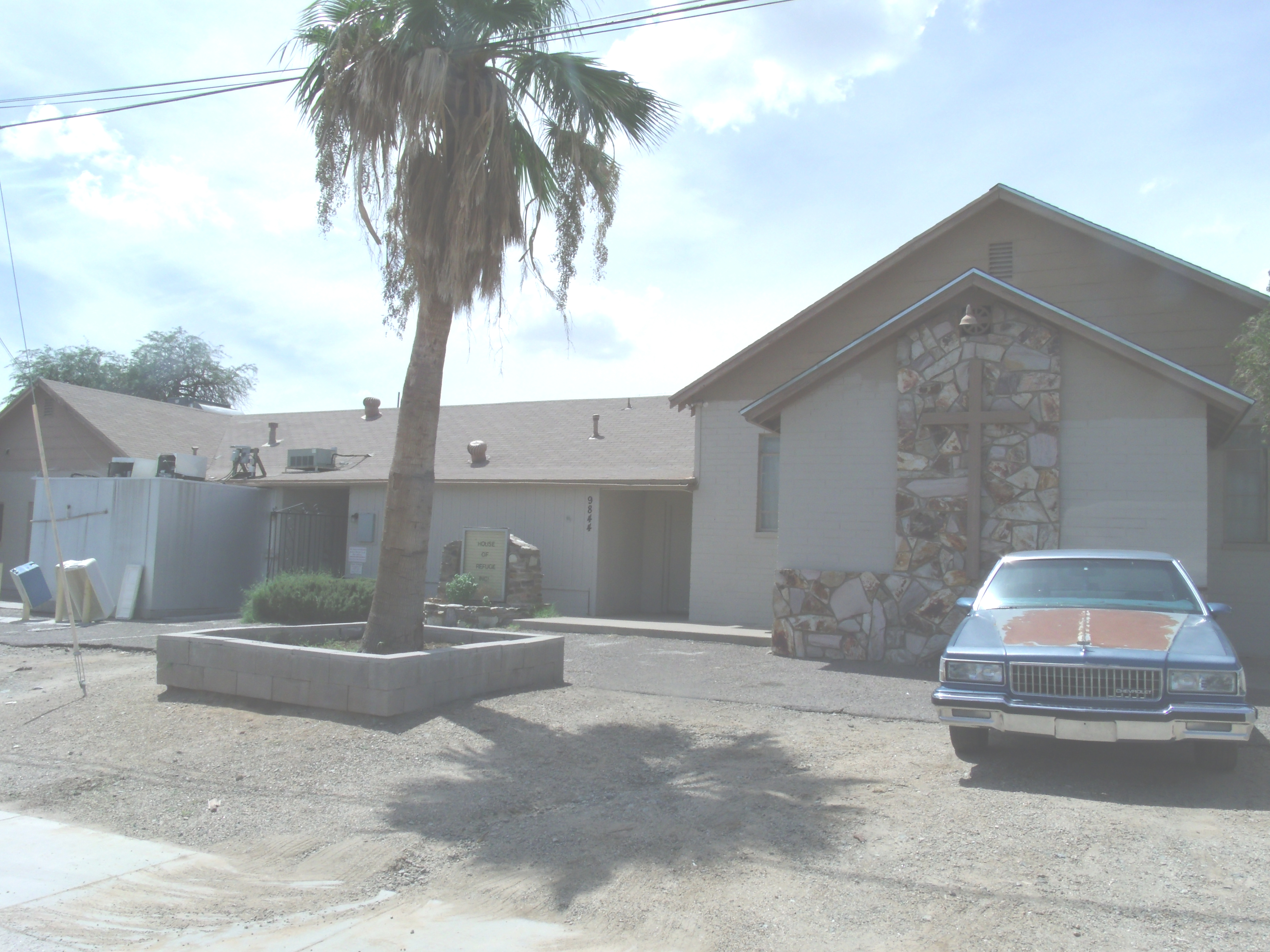
The First Mennonite Church of Sunnyslope was built in 1949 alongside the older Mennonite Church Meetinghouse, which was built in 1946. It is located at 9835 N. 7th Street, in Sunnyslope.

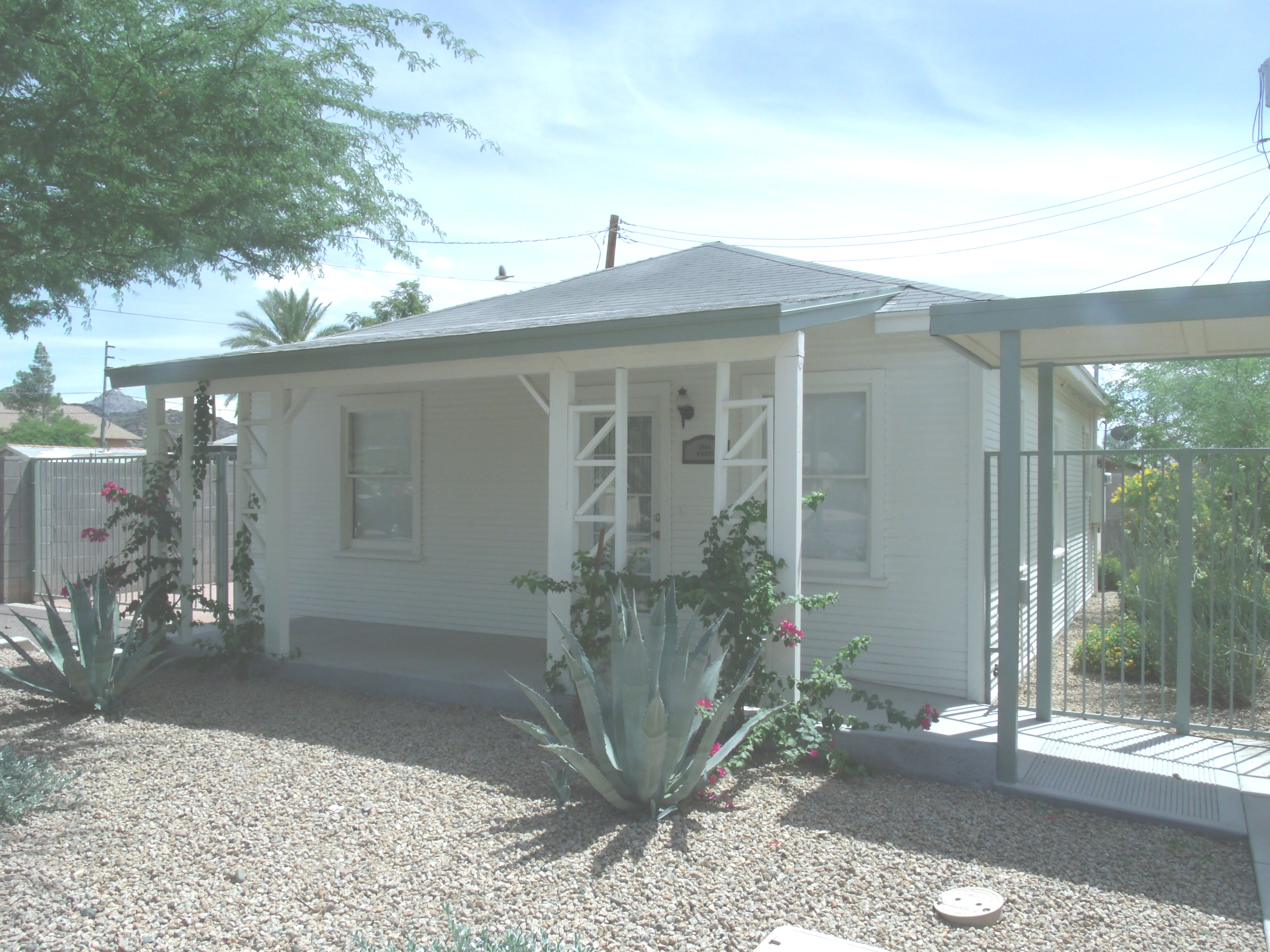
The historic Lovinggood House was built in 1945, by Walter Leon Lovinggood on a lot on 8924 2nd Street in Sunnyslope. In 1999, the house became property of the Sunnyslope Historical Society, which is located at 737 E. Hatcher Street.

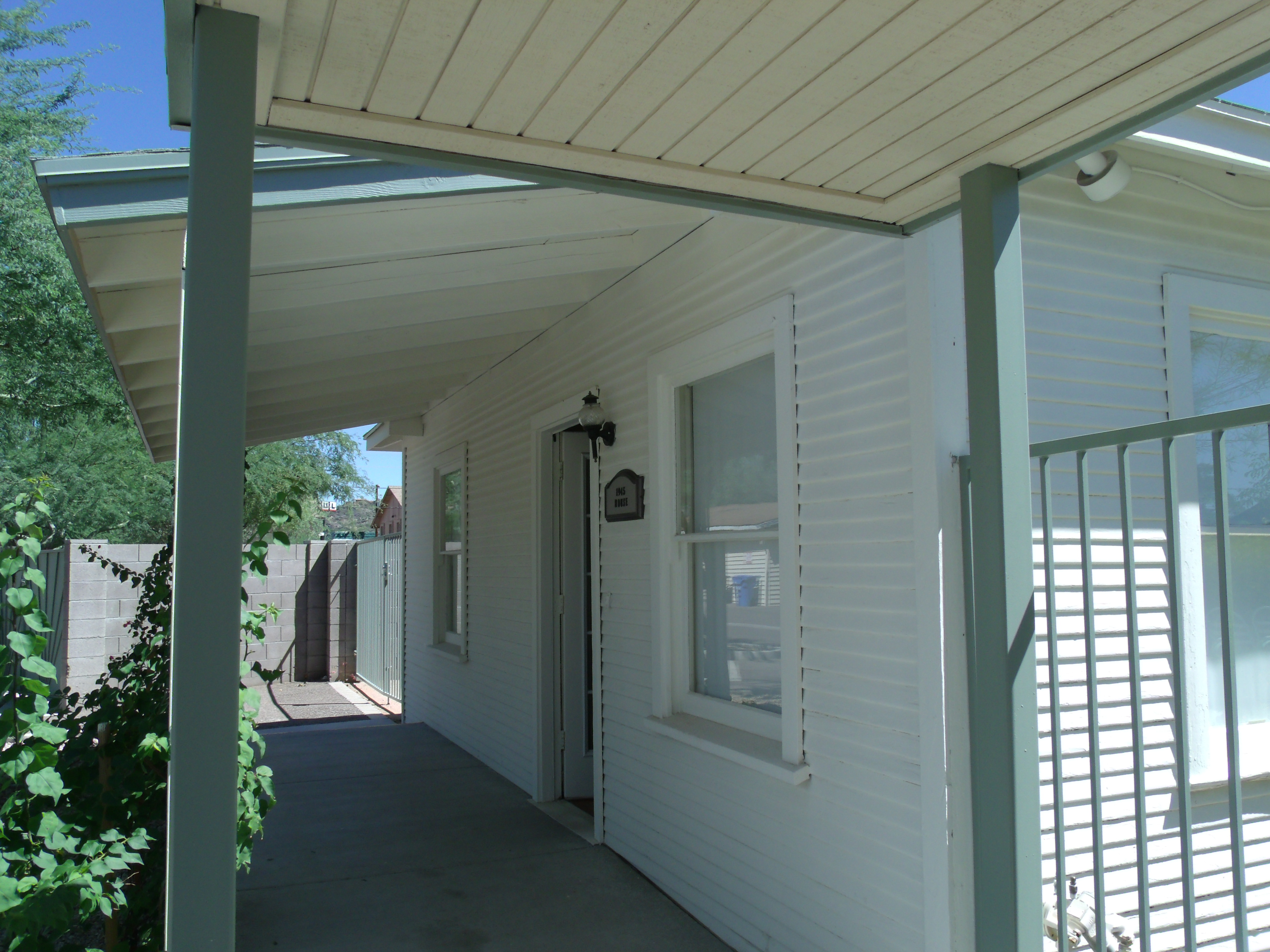
Different view of the 1945 historic Lovinggood House.

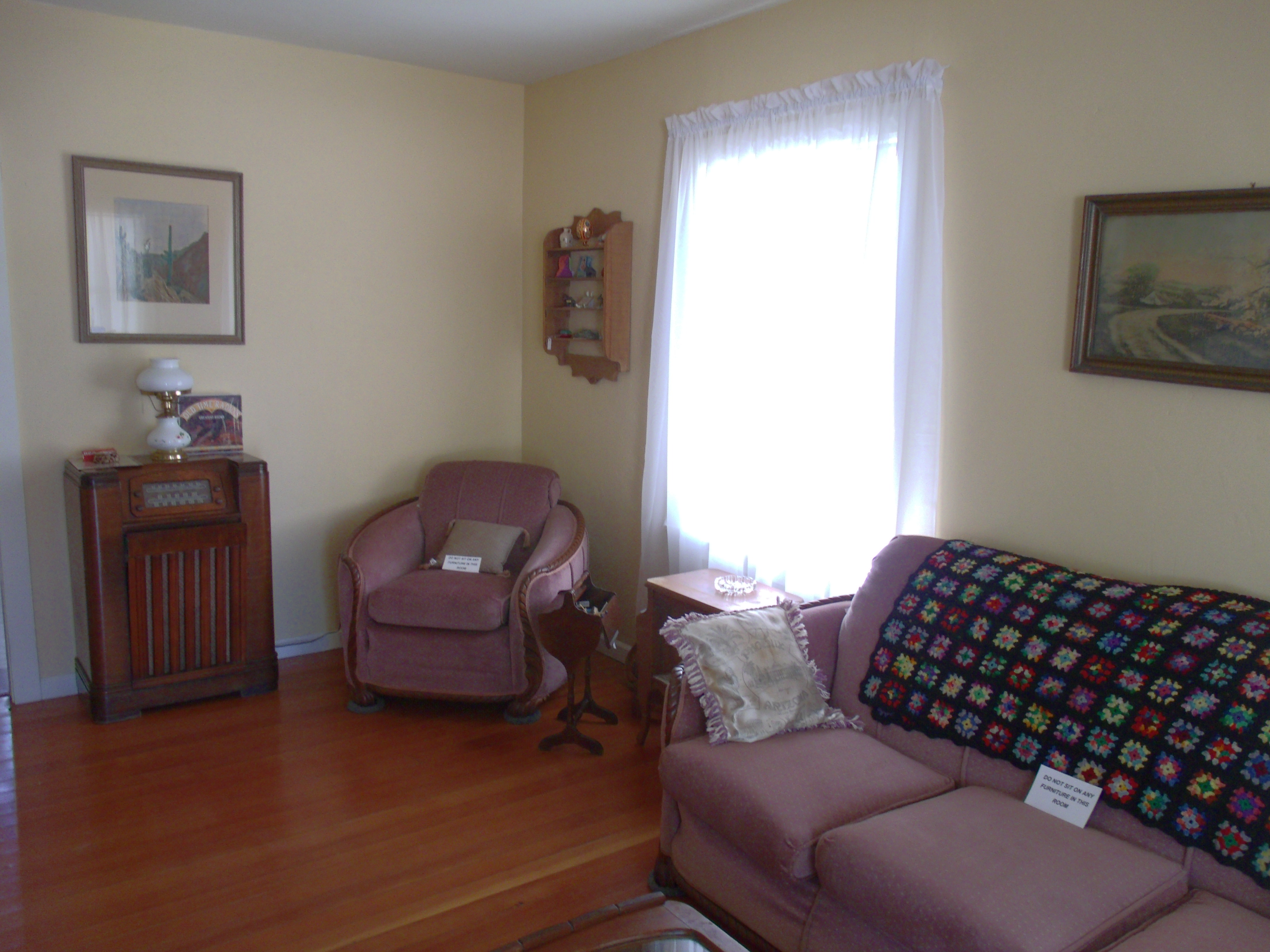
Inside the living room of the Lovinggood House.

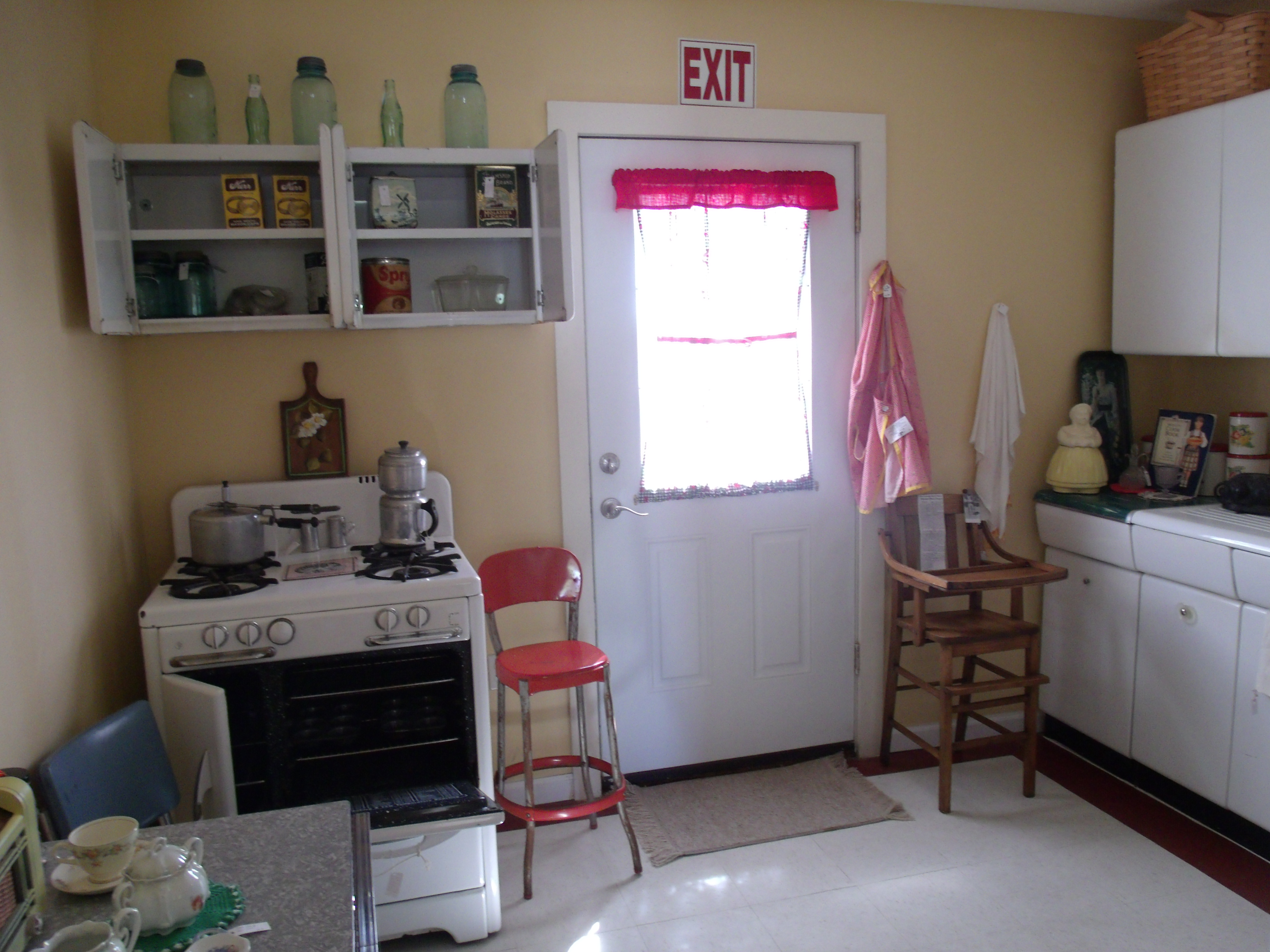
The kitchen of the Lovinggood House.

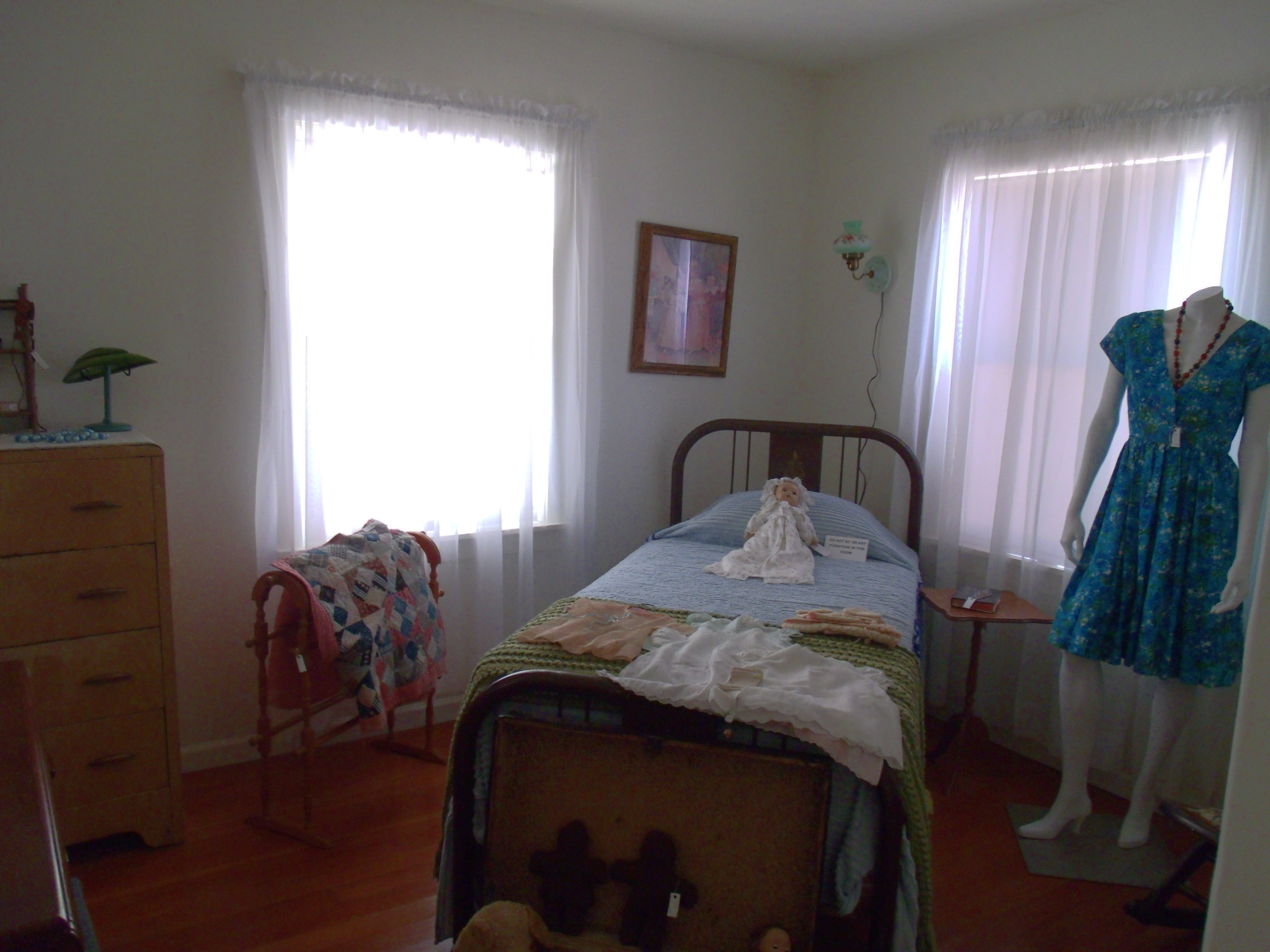
The bedroom of the Lovinggood House.

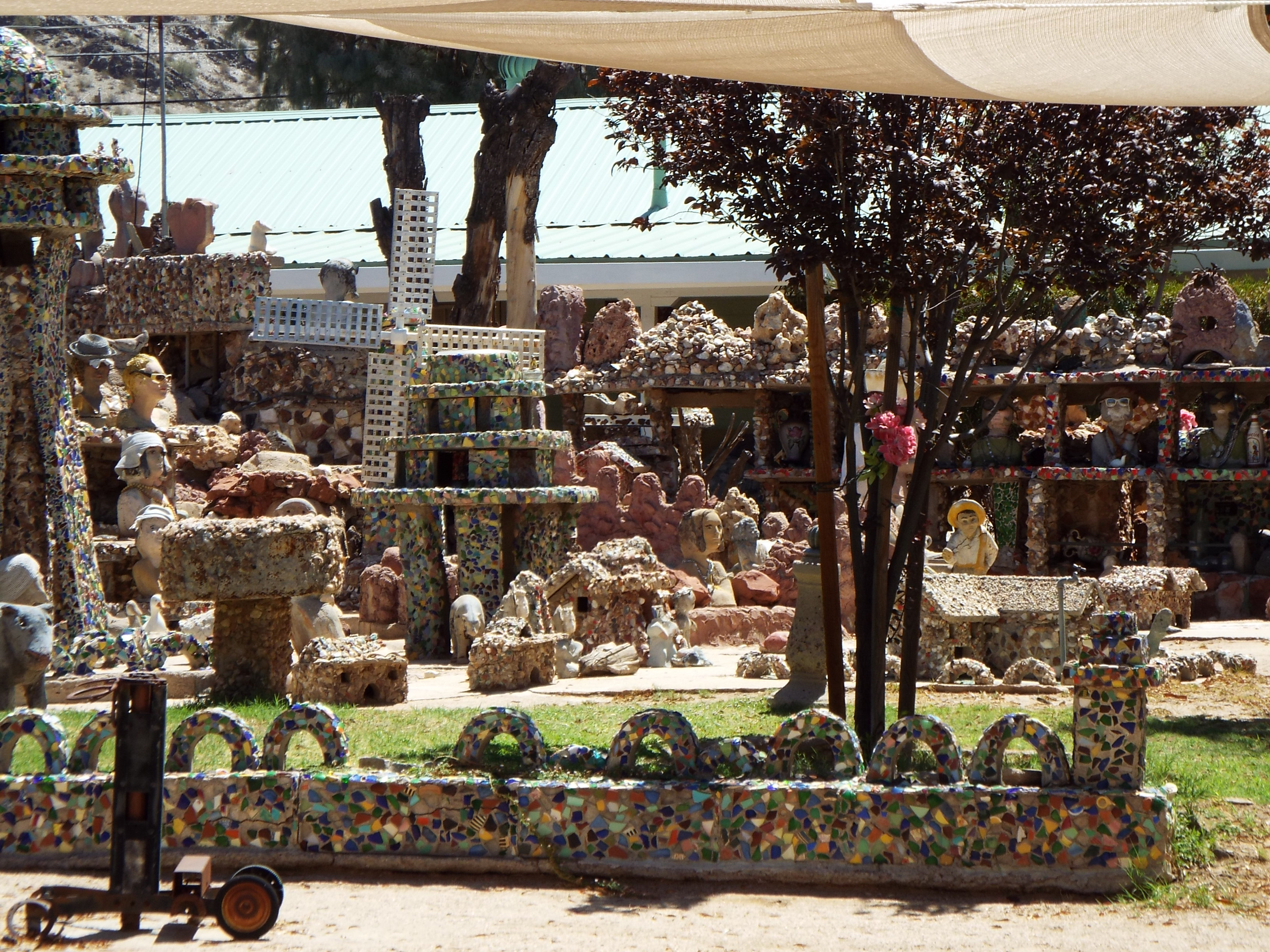
The Sunnyslope Rock Garden created by local artist Grover Cleveland Thompson between 1952 and 1972 is located on 10023 N. 13th Place.

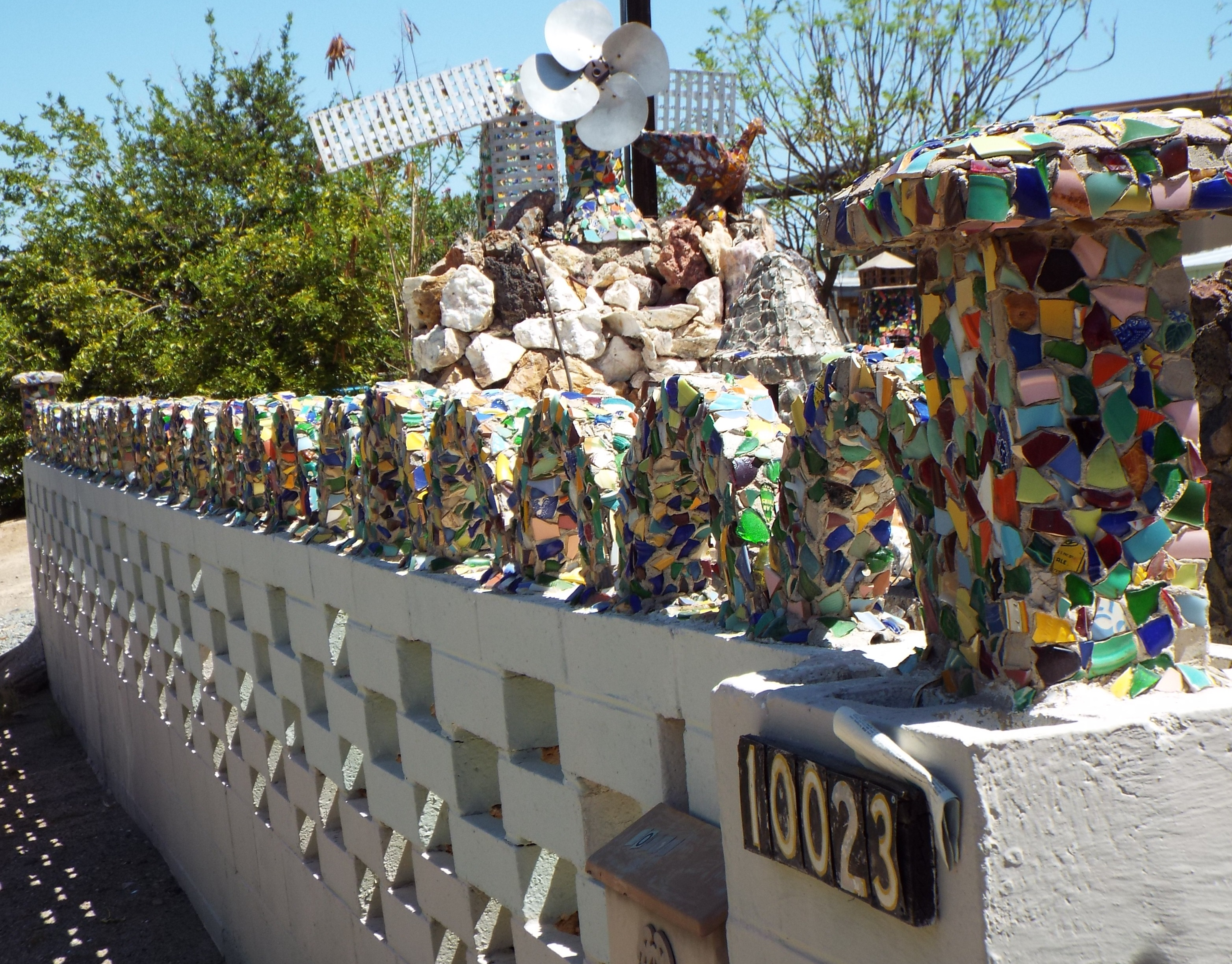
The snake created by Grover Cleveland Thompson which adorned the entrance of his house.

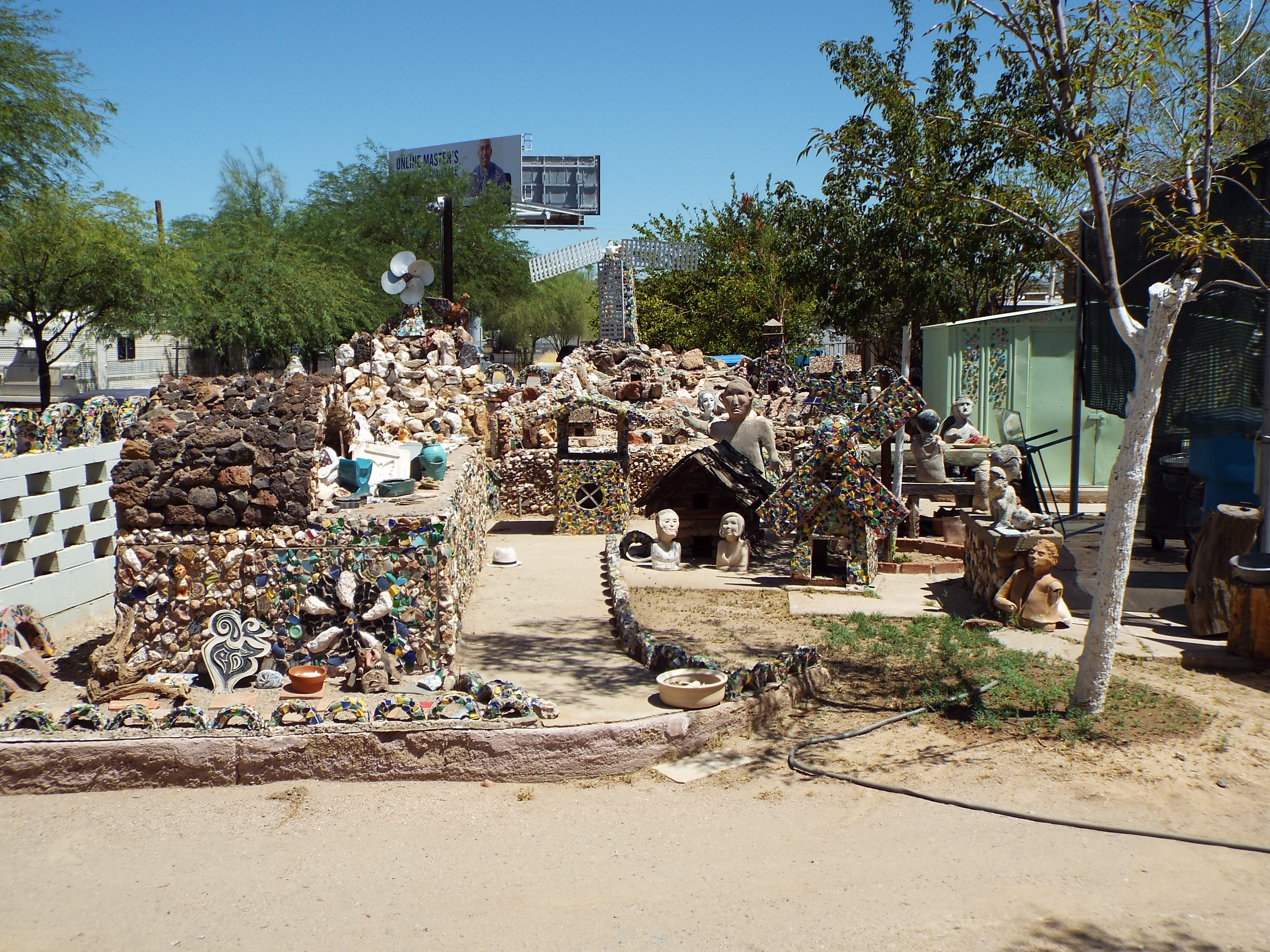
The Sunnyslope Rock Garden was created Thompson between the years of 1952 to 1972.

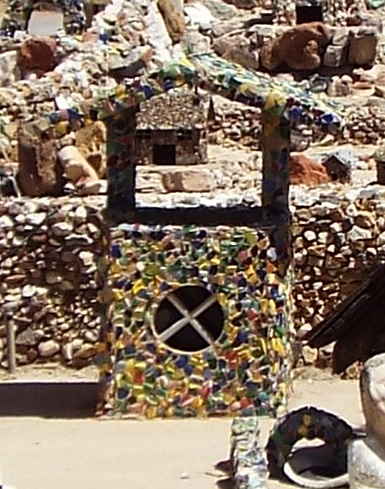
Thompson's art in the Sunnyslope Rock Garden.

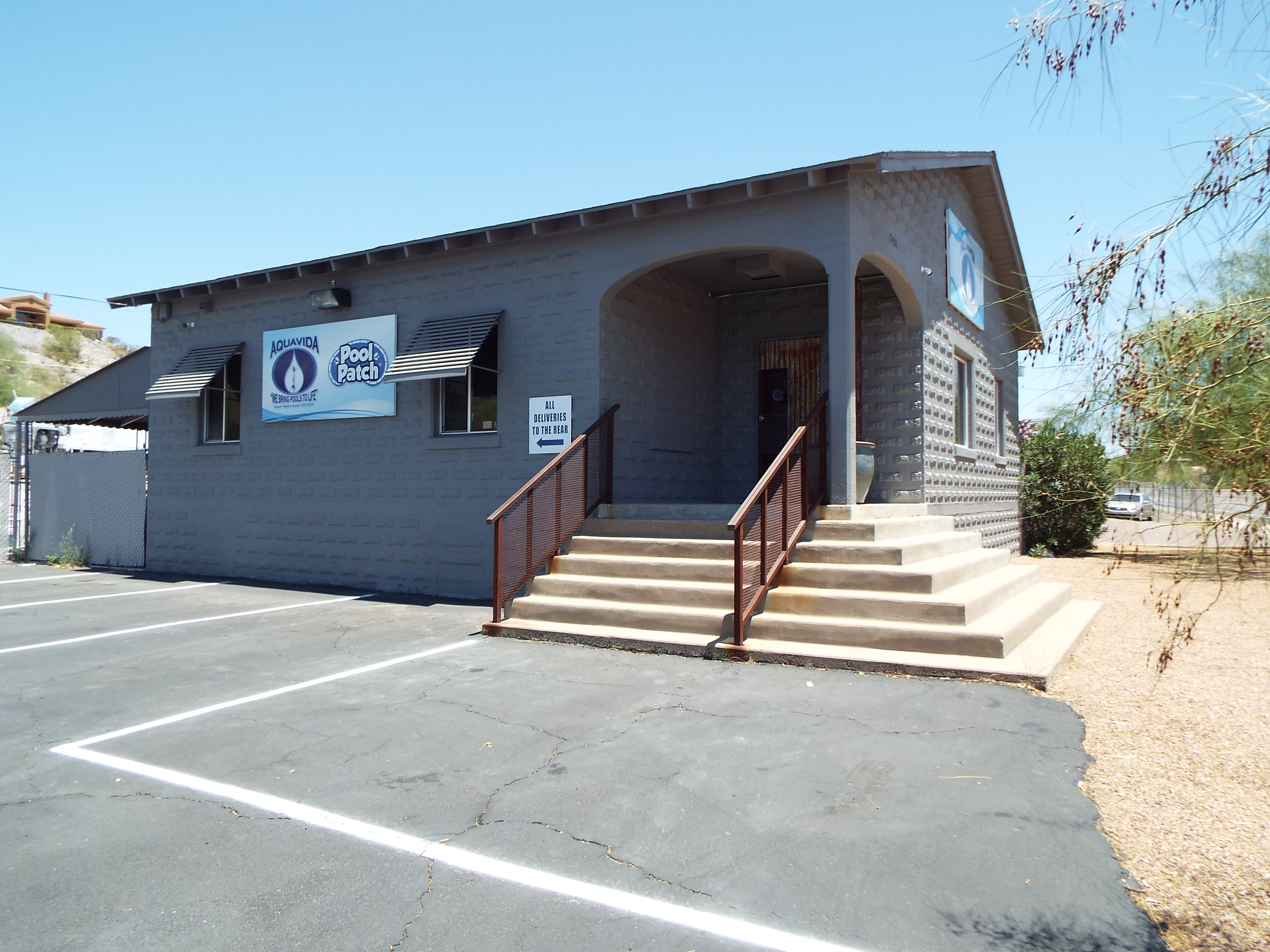
The Charles and Eleanor Abel House was built in 1955 and is located at 11430 Cave Creek Roa. It was the first house in Sunnyslope with a bomb shelter, which also served as a basement. The residence is now used for commercial purposes.

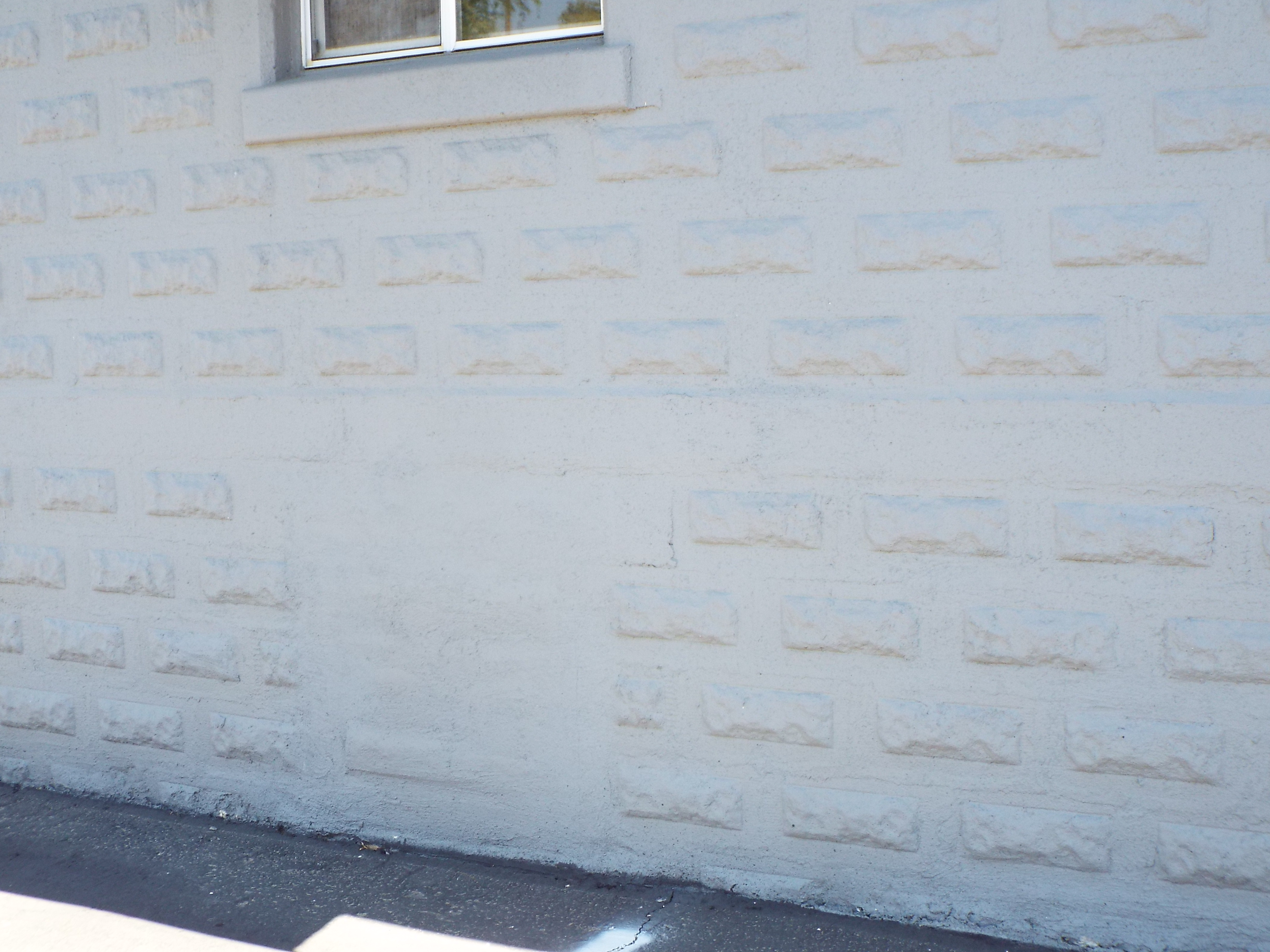
Location of one of the bomb shelter windows of the Charles and Eleanor Abel House, which was covered up with cement.

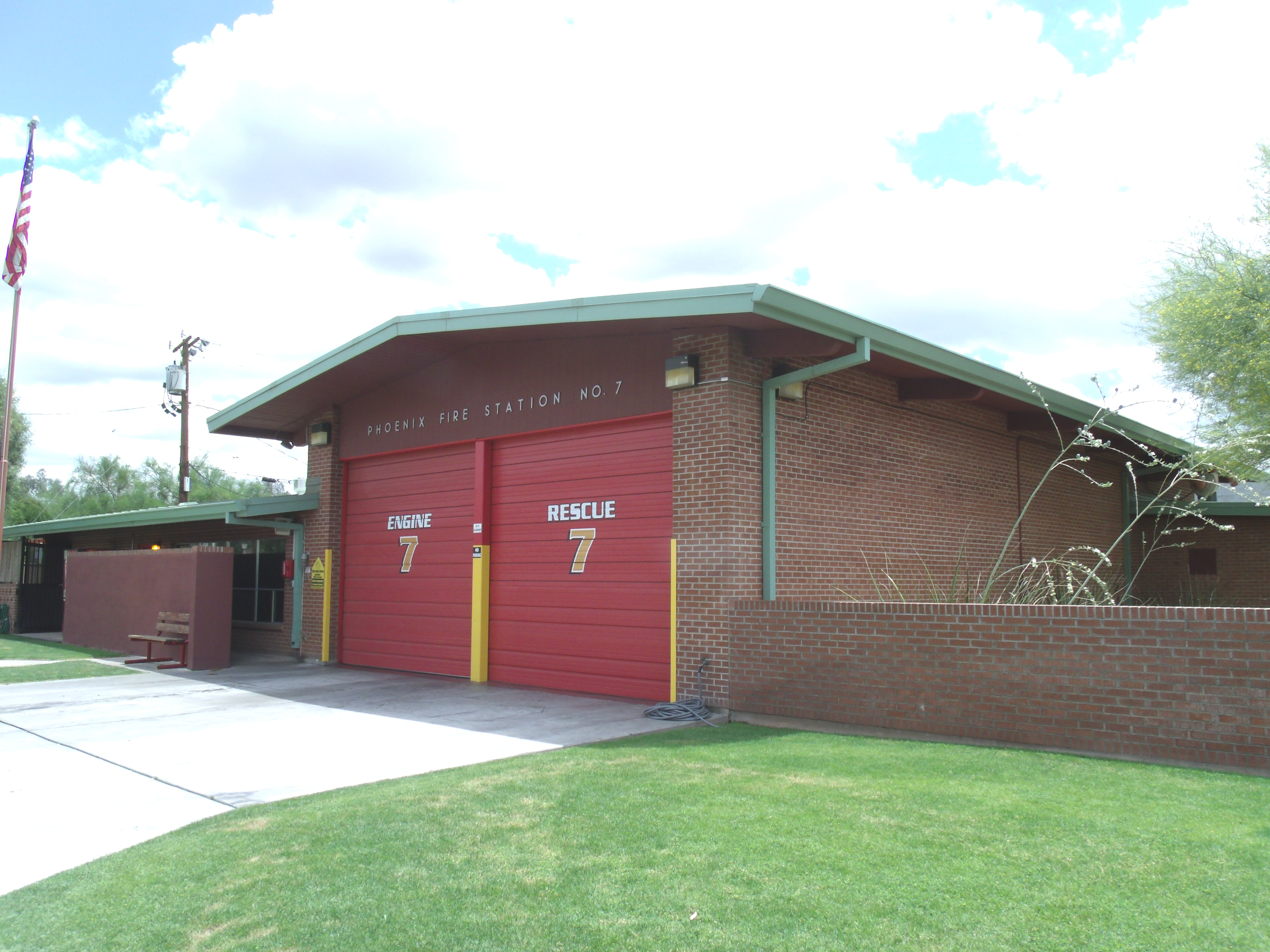
Phoenix Fire Station #7 was built in 1966 and is located at 403 E. Hatcher Rd. in the Sunnyslope District. The fire station is considered historic by the Sunnyslope Historic Society ,

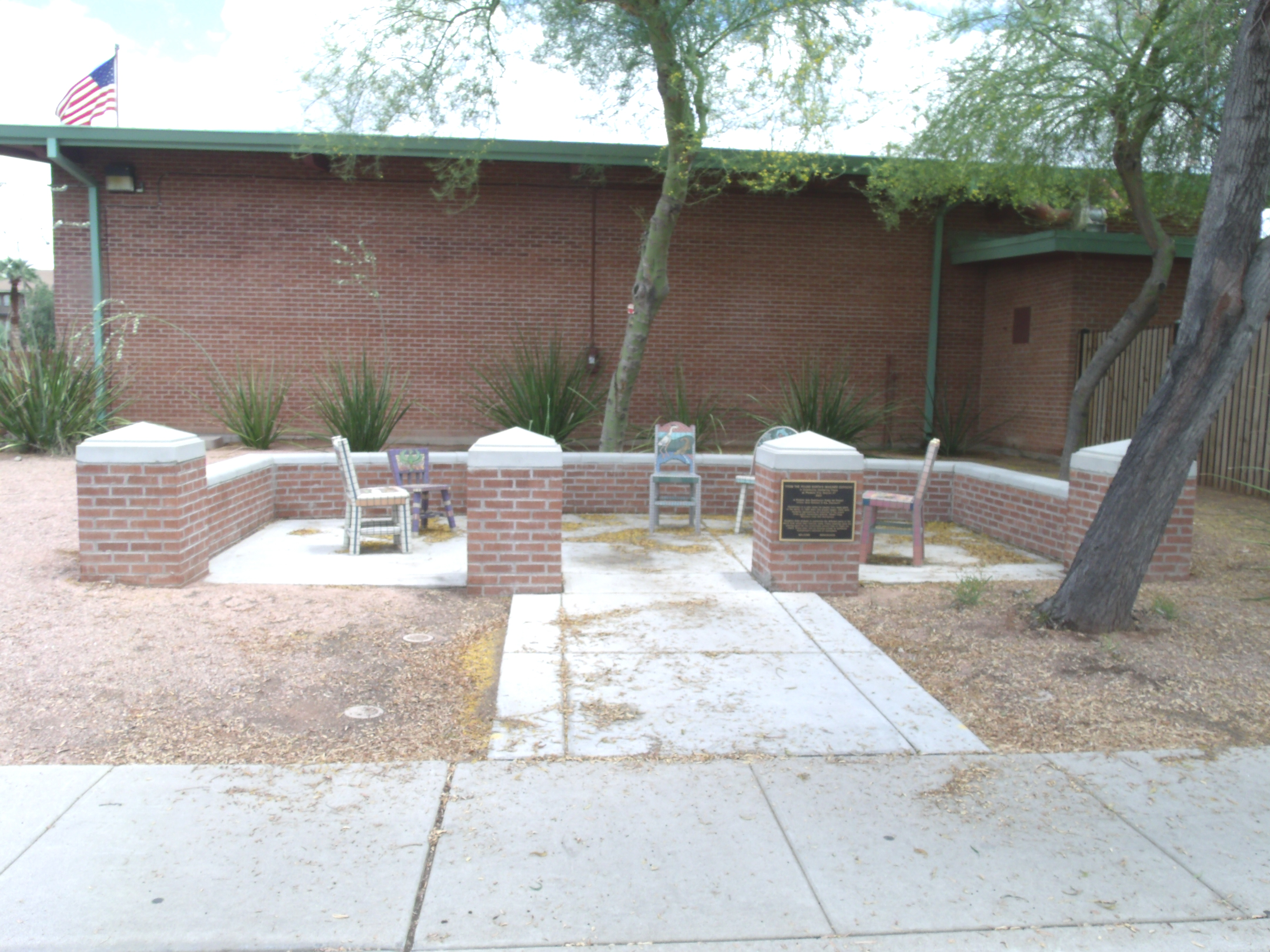
Area of the Phoenix Fire Station #7 located at 403 E. Hatcher Rd. which was dedicated to the people of Sunnyslope who used to gather and discuss issues regarding their community.

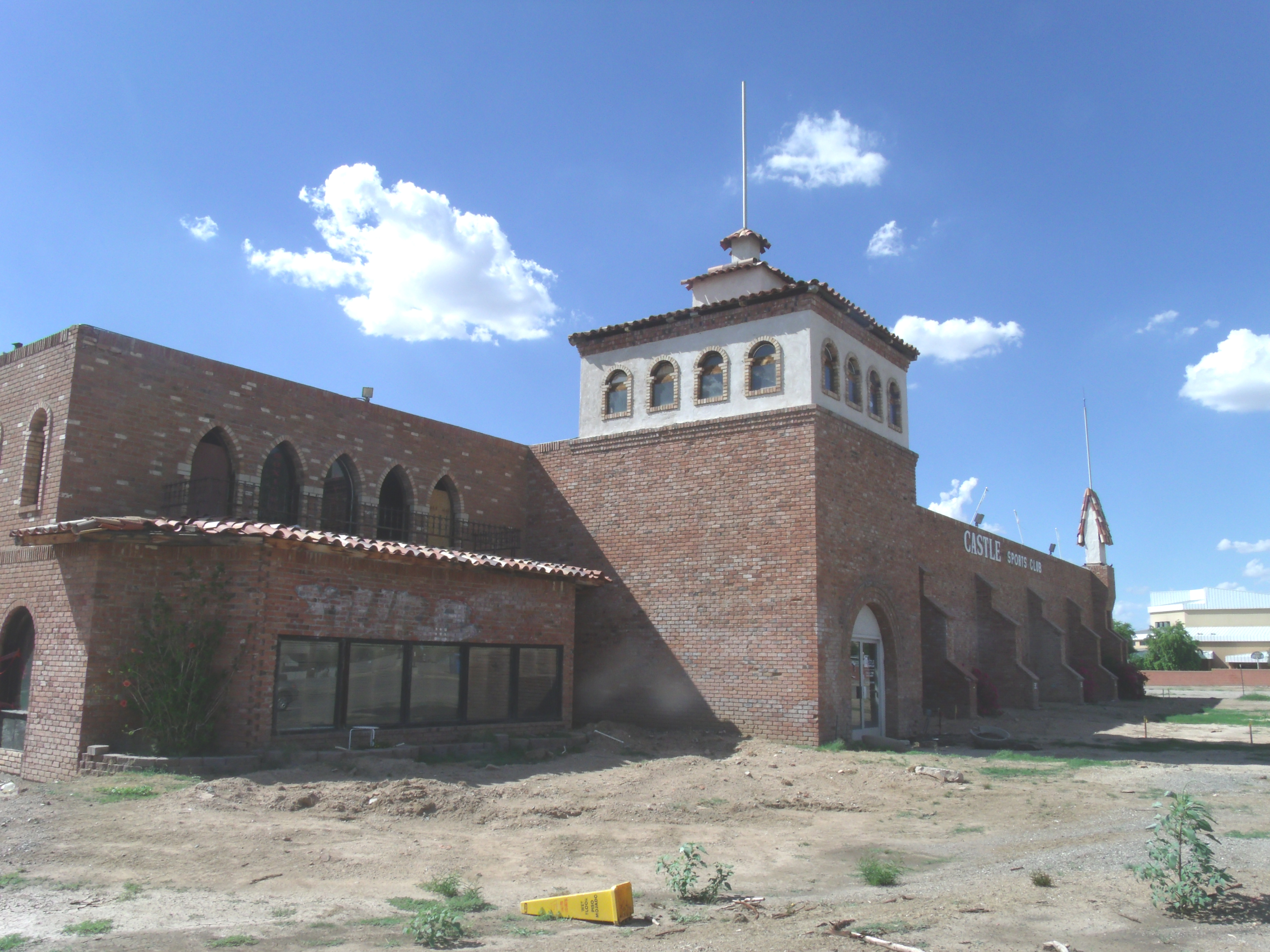
The historic "El Cid Castle" was a bowling alley that resembled a Moorish Castle. It was built by the late Dr. Kenneth Hall, a physician who served the Community of Sunnyslope in Phoenix. Construction on the structure began in 1963 and was completed in 1980. It is located at the Northwest corner of 19th Ave and West Cholla Drive, which technically is on the opposite side Sunnyslope's western boundary.

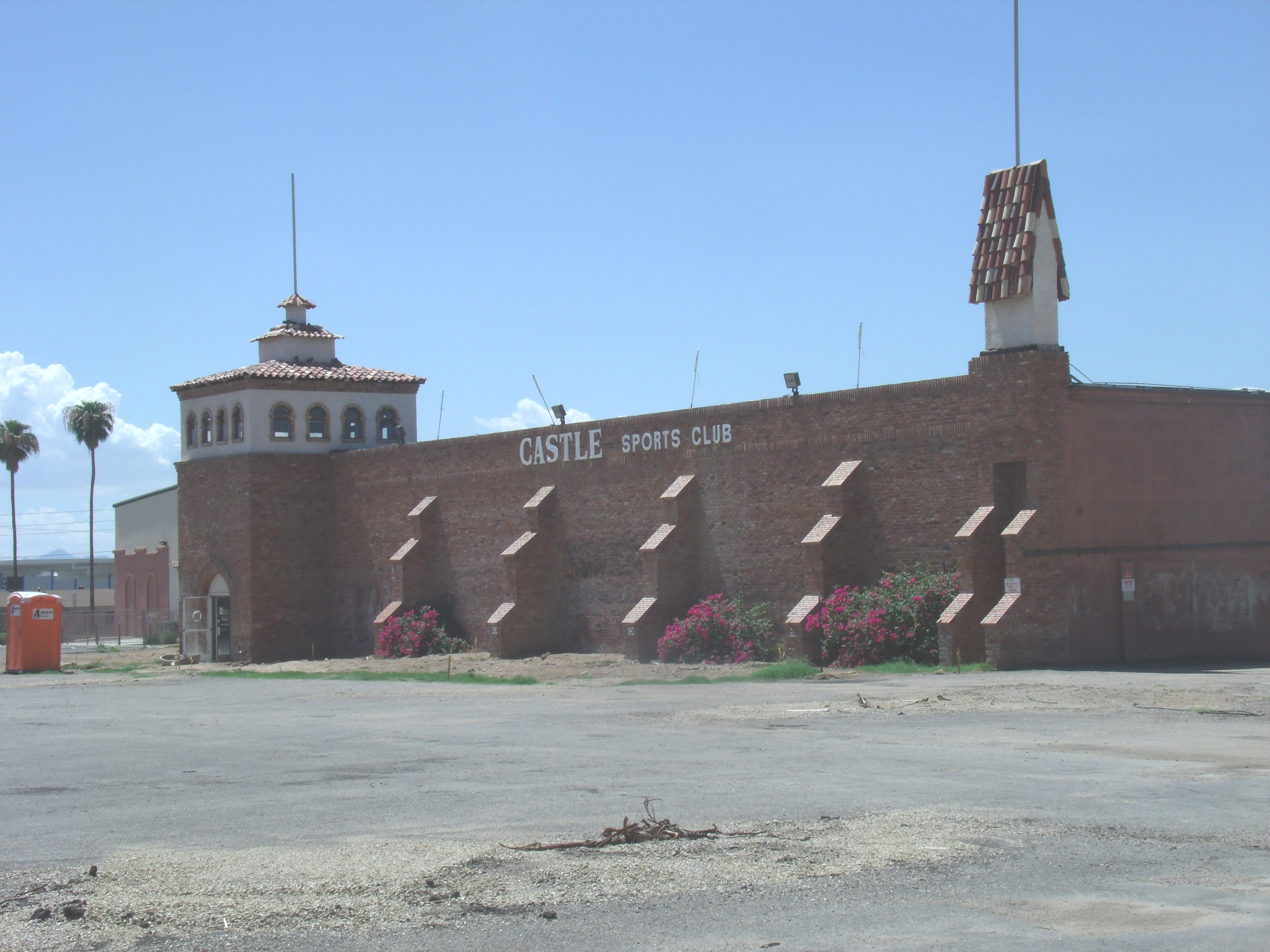
Different view of El Cid Castle. It is currently under restoration.

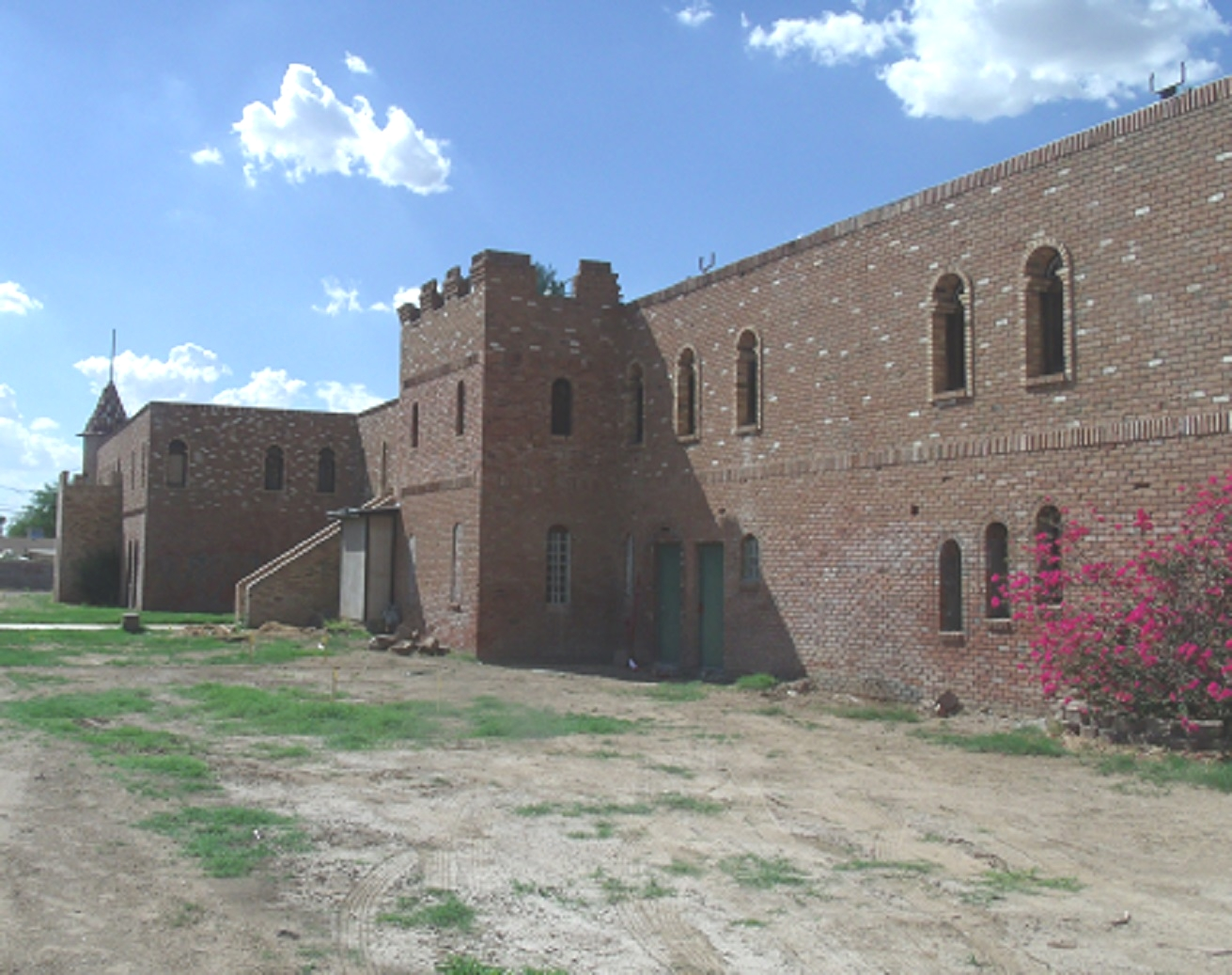
Side view El Cid Castle. The castle was a bowling alley that resembled a Moorish castle.

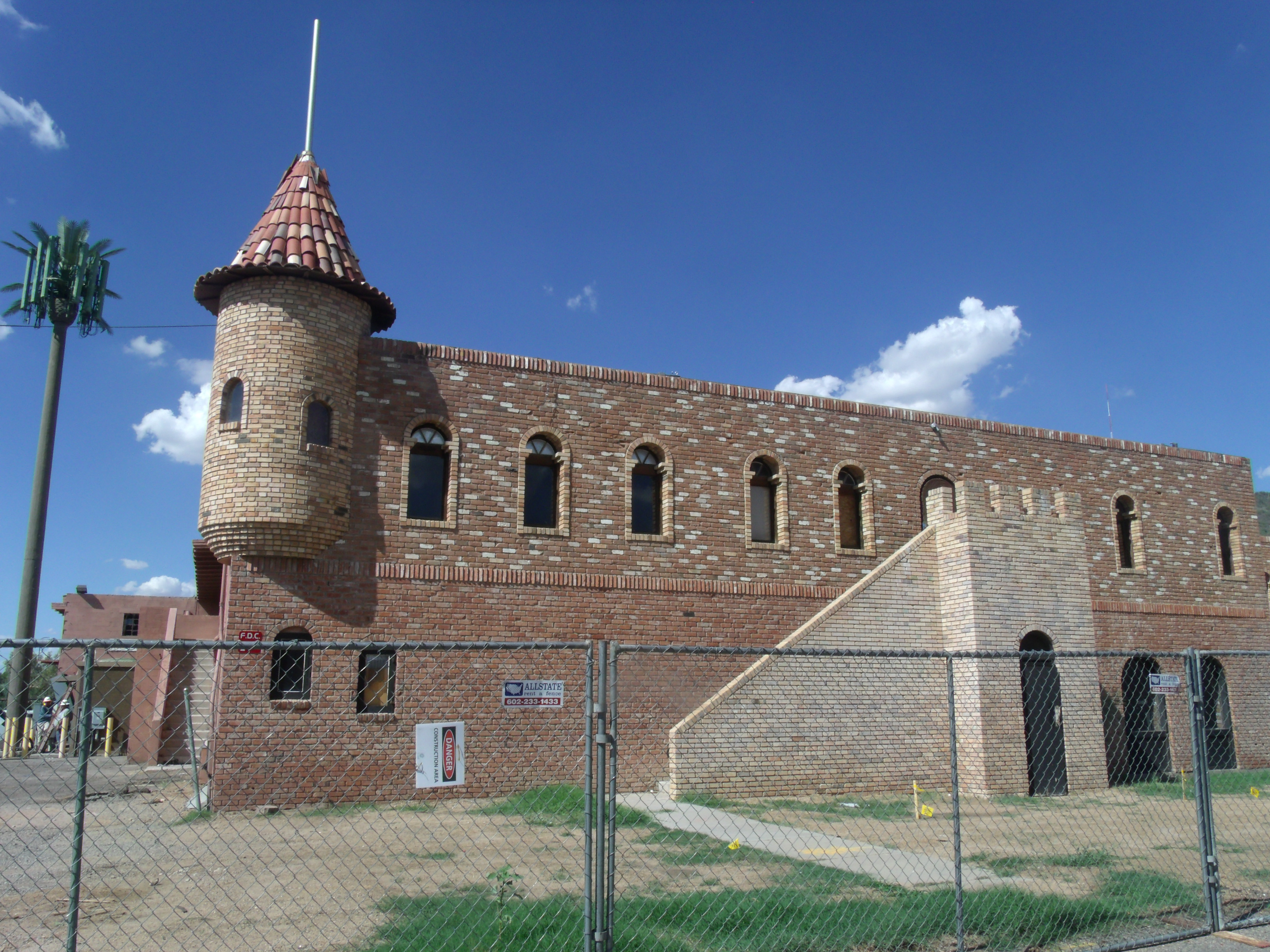
Different side view of El Cid Castle, located at the Northwest corner of 19th Ave and West Cholla Drive in Phoenix.

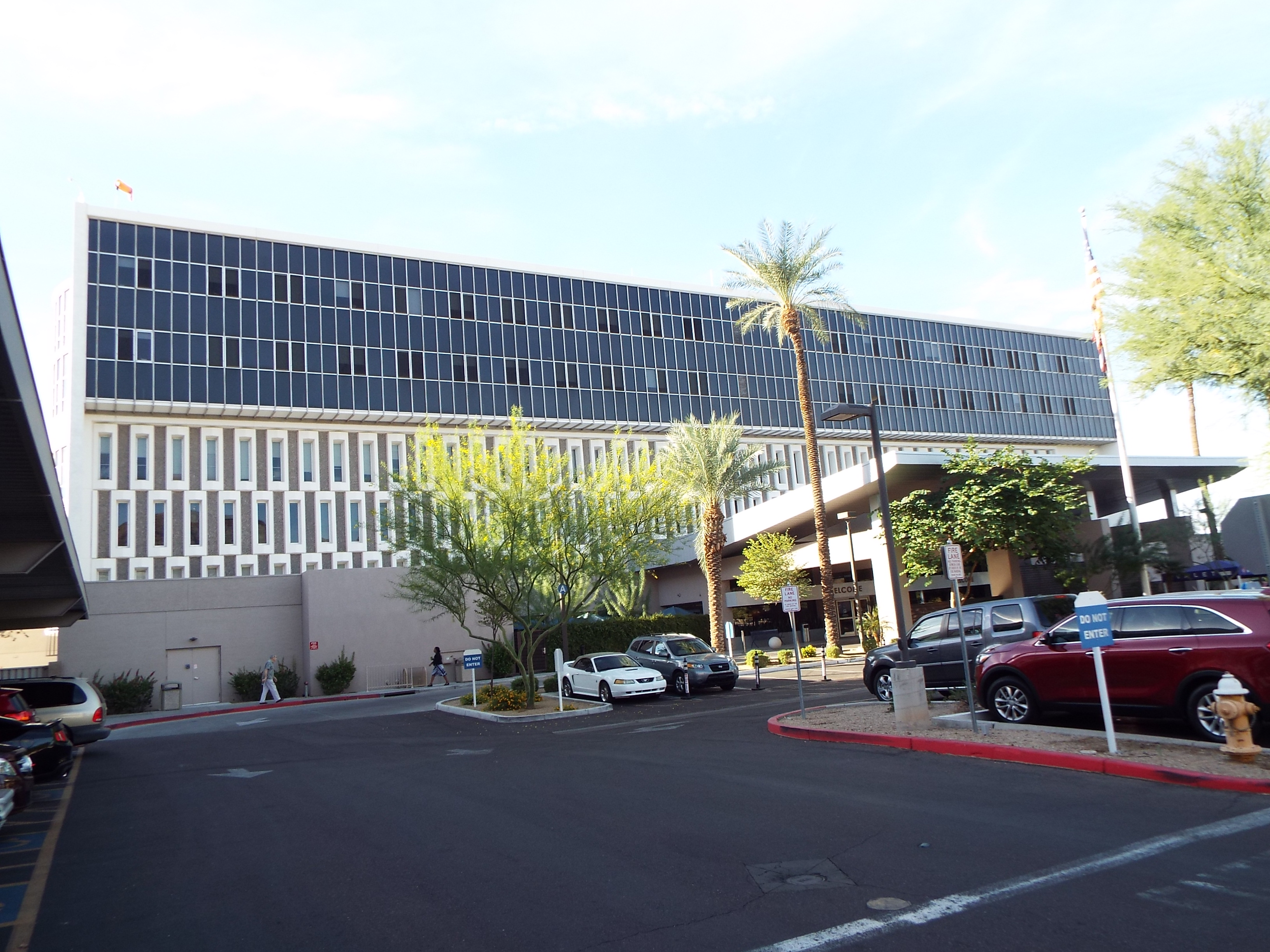
The John C. Lincoln Medical Center built in 1965 in Sunnyslope, Arizona. Named after John C. Lincoln (1866–1959) an American inventor, entrepreneur and philanthropist.

== Miscellaneous ==
Historic monuments, memorials and historical related objects of interest

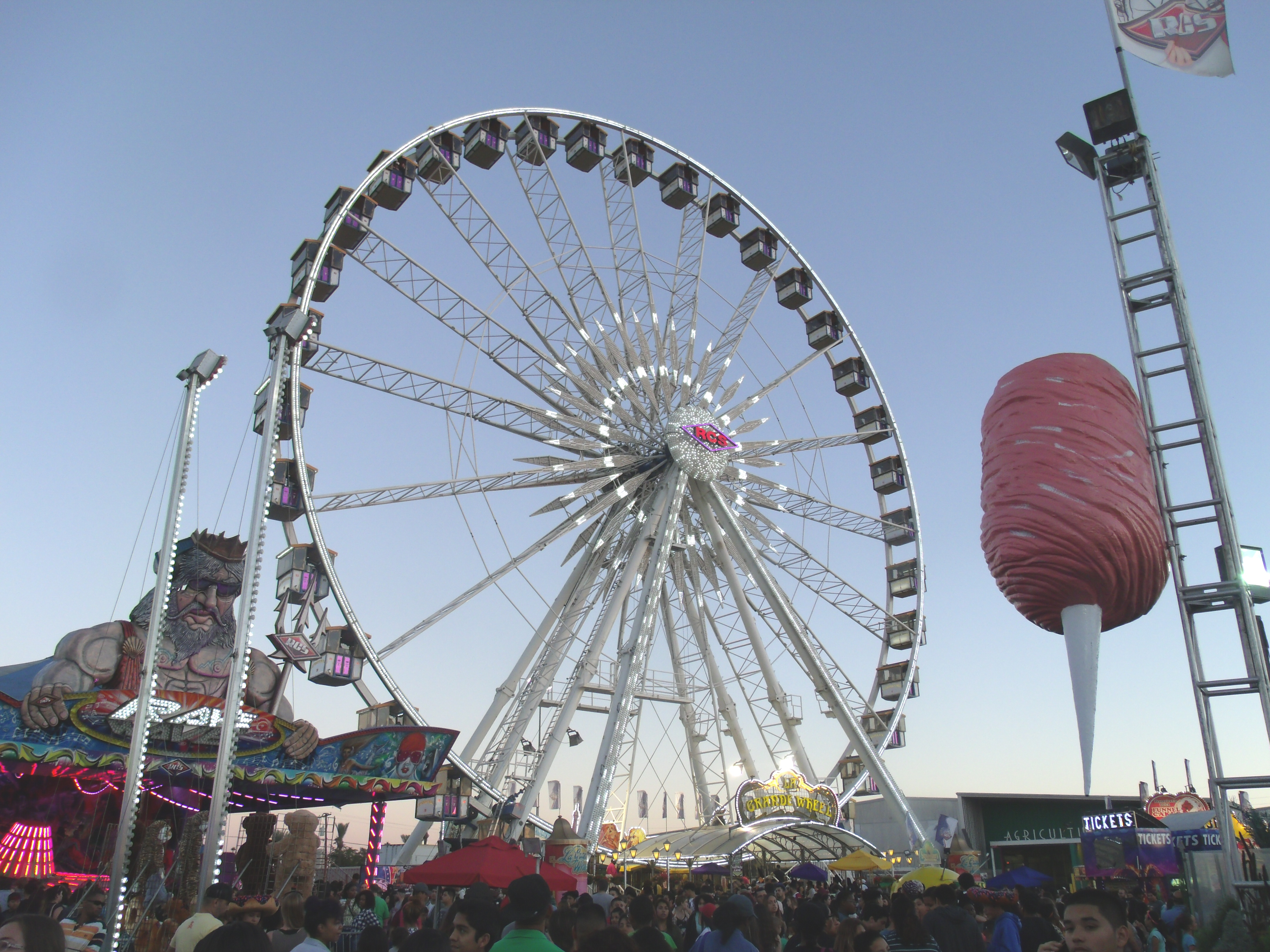
La Grande Wheel is the largest transportable Ferris Wheel in the world. The height of La Grande Wheel is 130 feet. The Ferris Wheel is located on the Arizona State Fairgrounds at 1826 West McDowell Road.

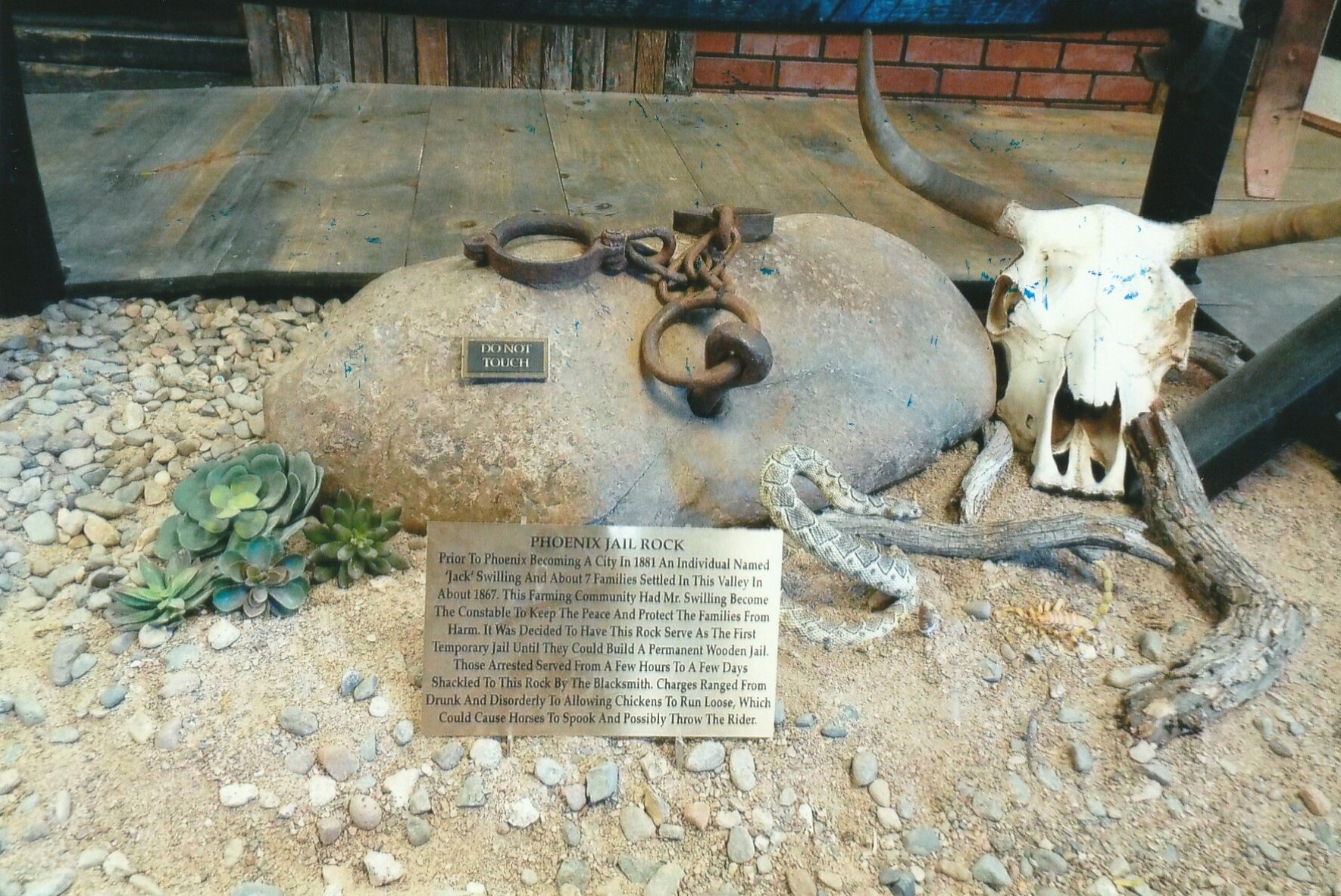
The Jail Rock. Jack Swilling, the founder of Phoenix, was named constable. This river rock was used as a temporary jail before the first wooden jail house was built. It served as a leg iron to shackle prisoners. On display in the Phoenix Police Museum.

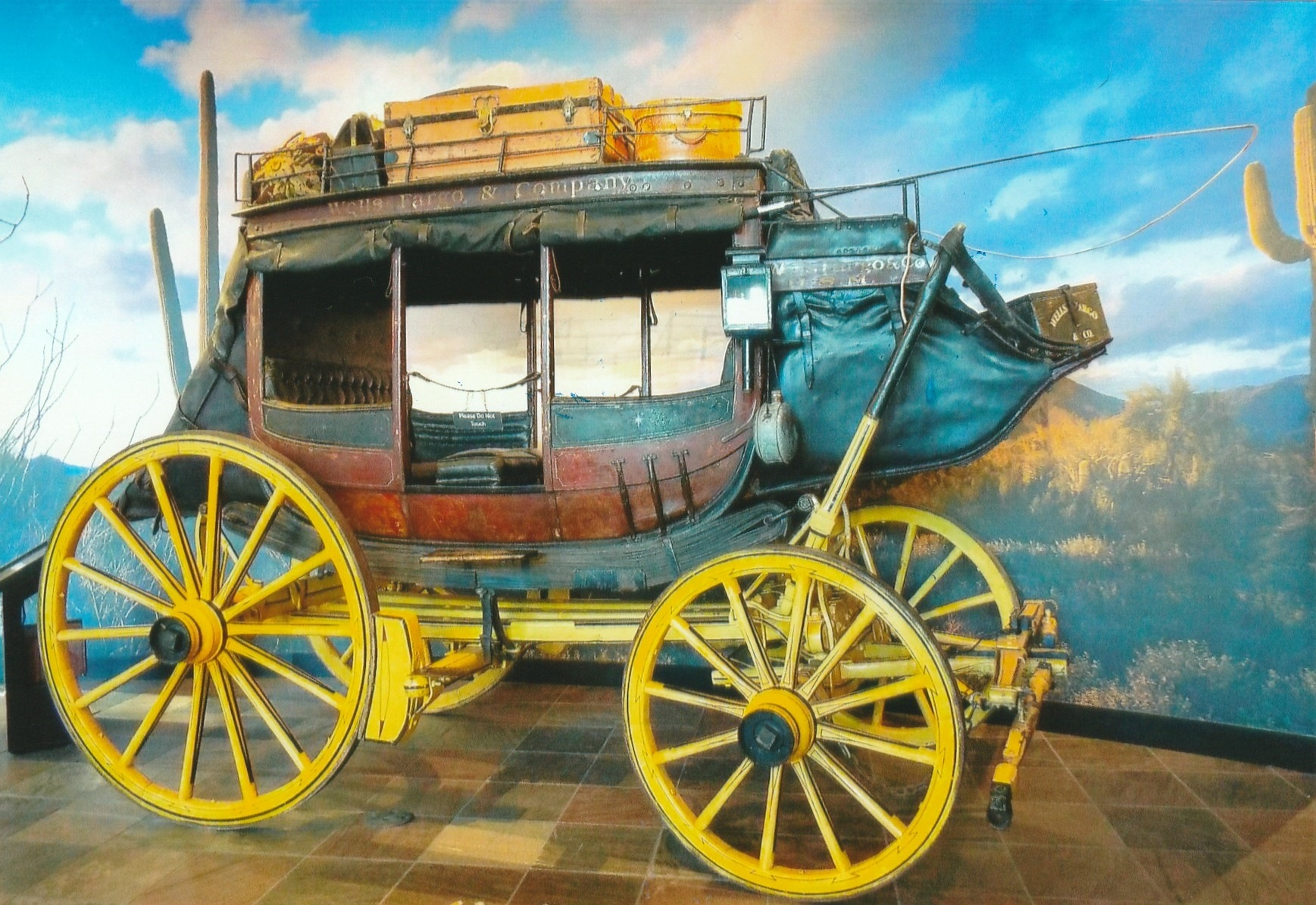
1879 Wells Fargo Stagecoach used in Phoenix on exhibit in the Wells Fargo Museum.

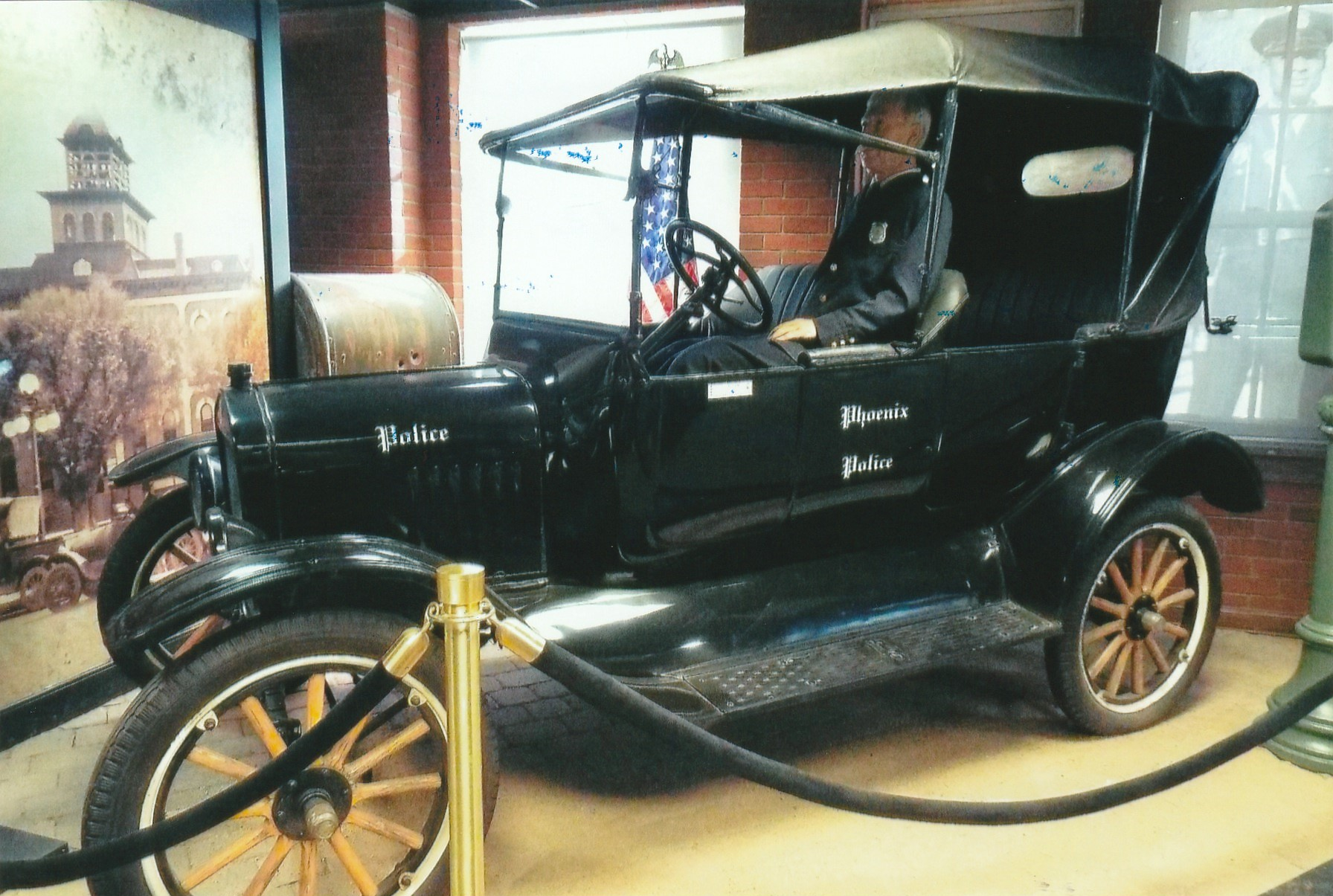
1919 Ford Model T Phoenix Police Cruiser. It had a 20 horsepower engine and ran a maximum speed of 45 mph. On display in the Phoenix Police Museum.

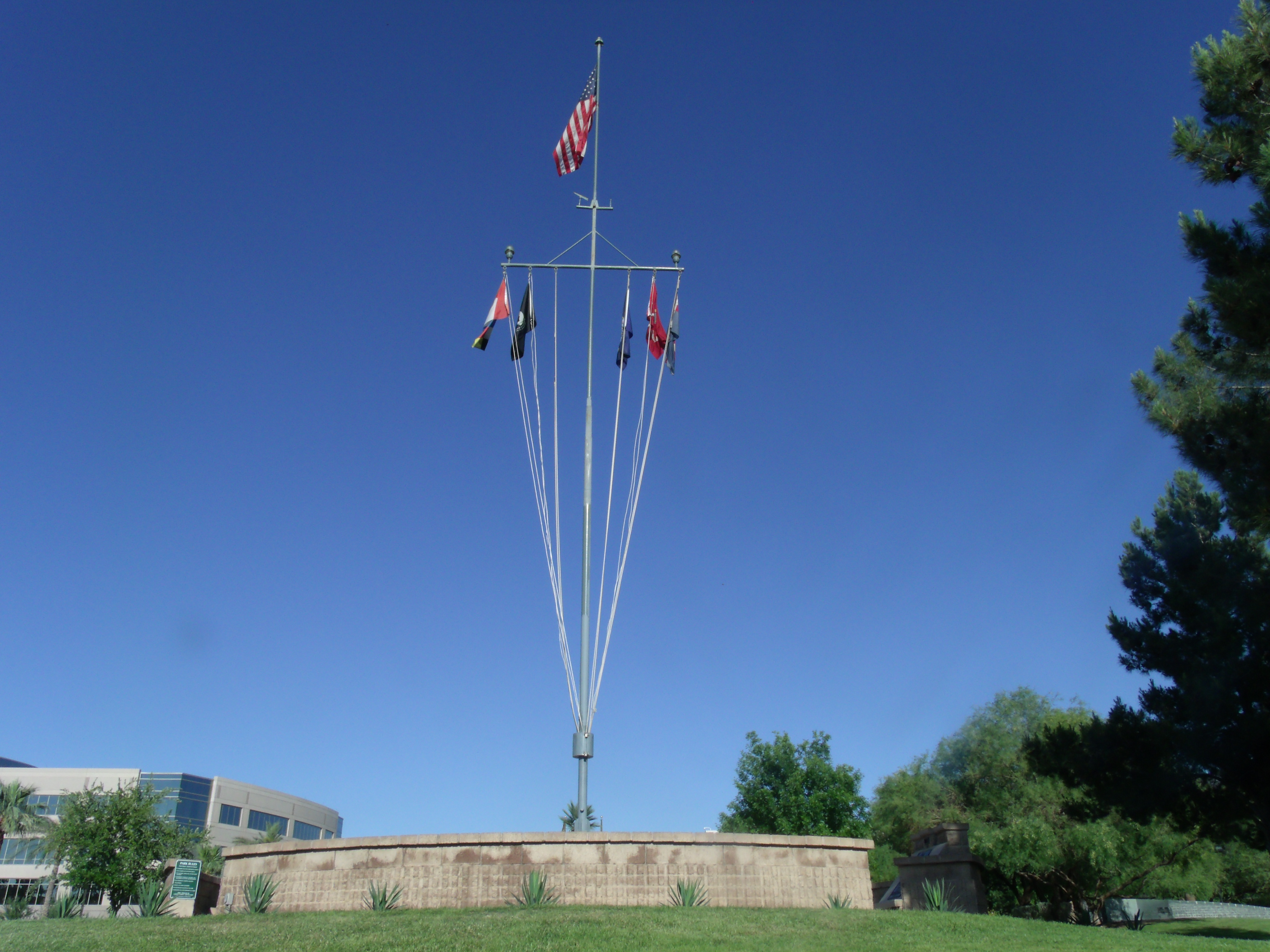
USS Arizona Signal Mast

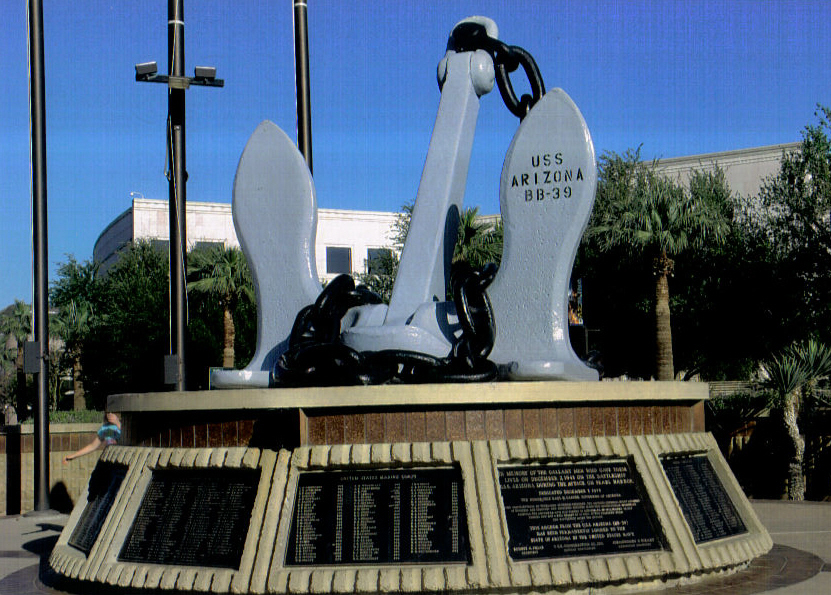
The Anchor from the USS Arizona located at Wesley Bolin Memorial Plaza on the grounds of Arizona's State Capital.

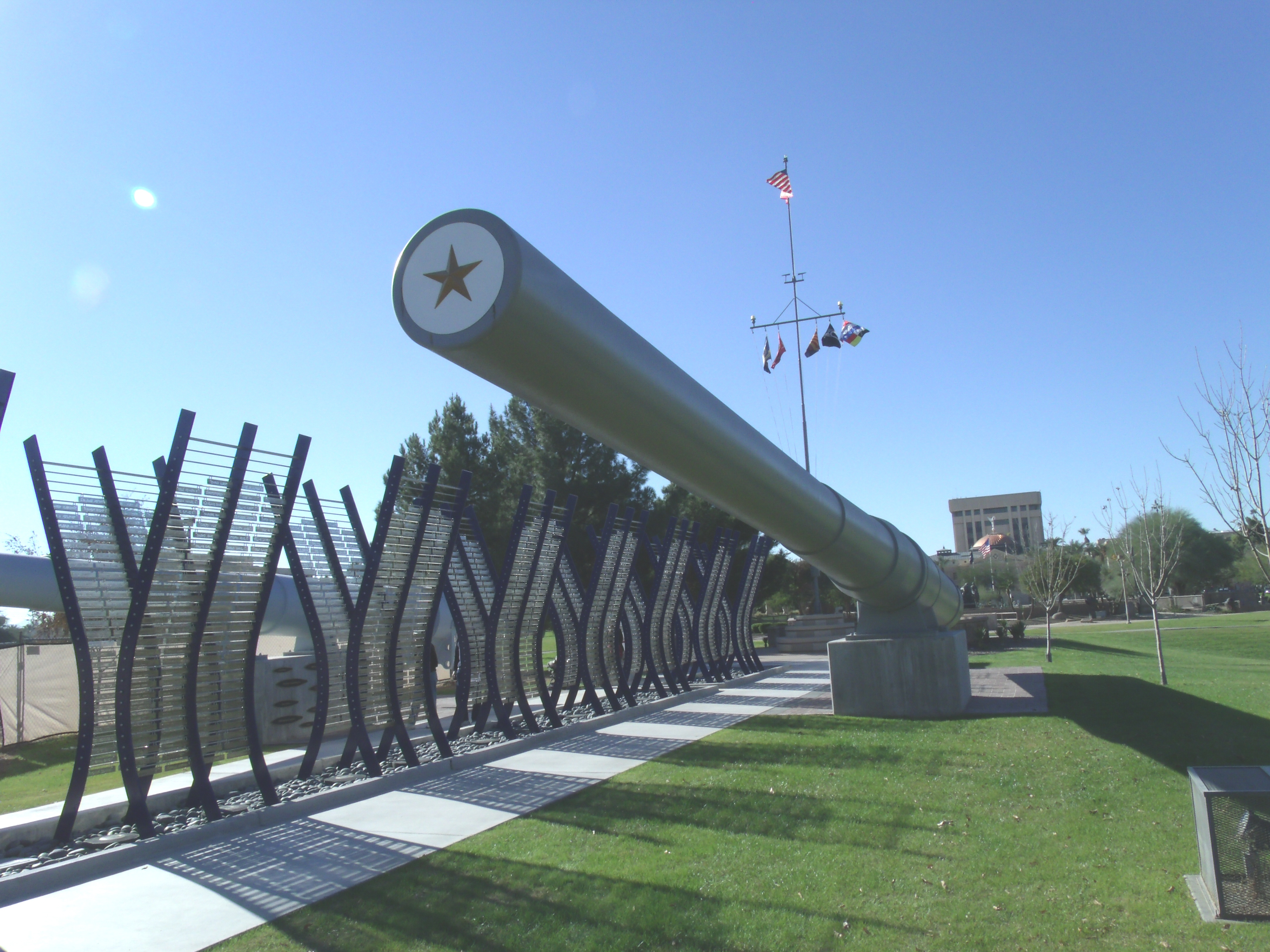
The restored gun barrel from the USS Missouri on display in Wesley Bolin Plaza.

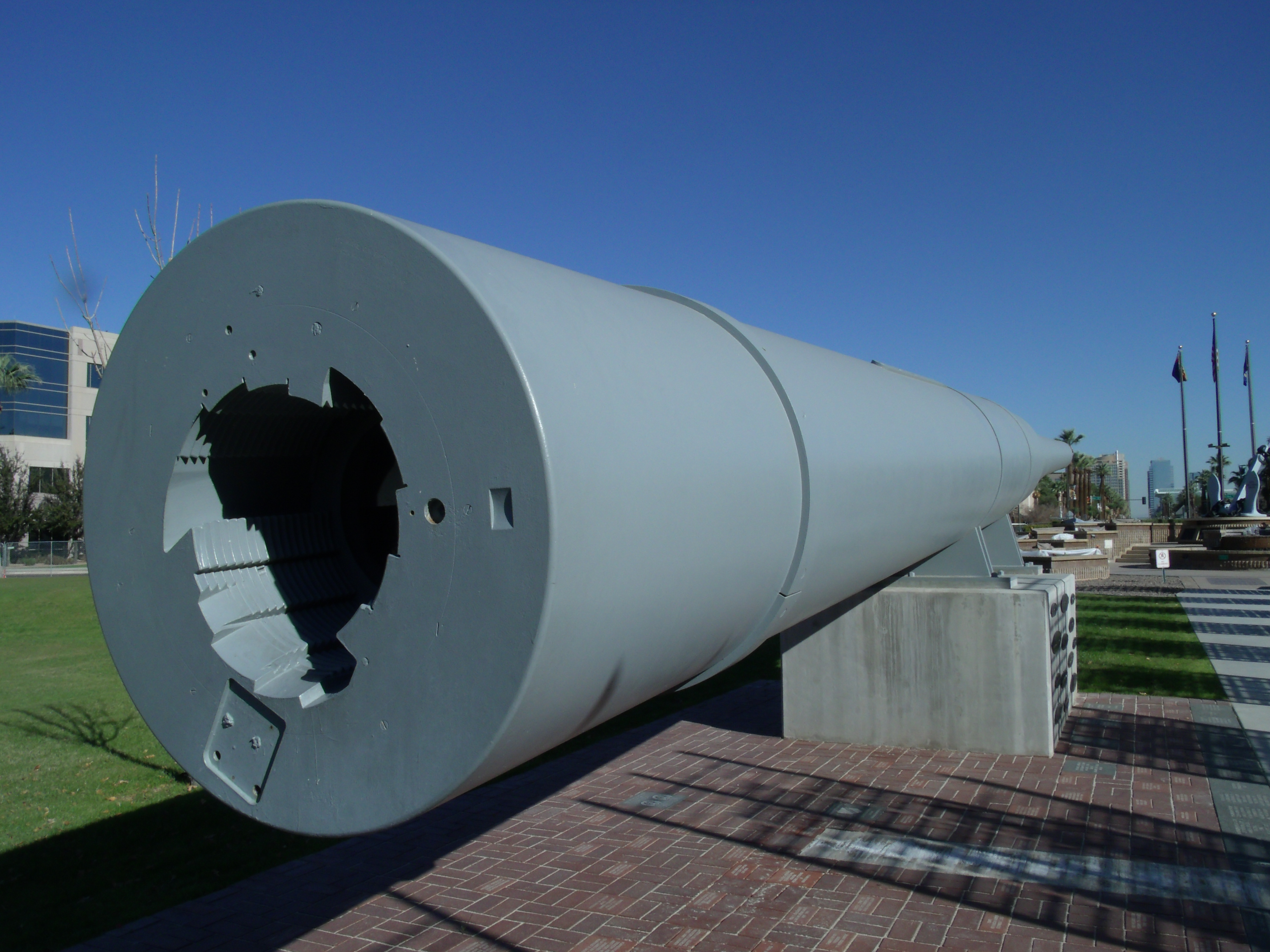
Different view of the restored gun barrel from the USS Missouri. It is on display in Wesley Bolin Plaza.

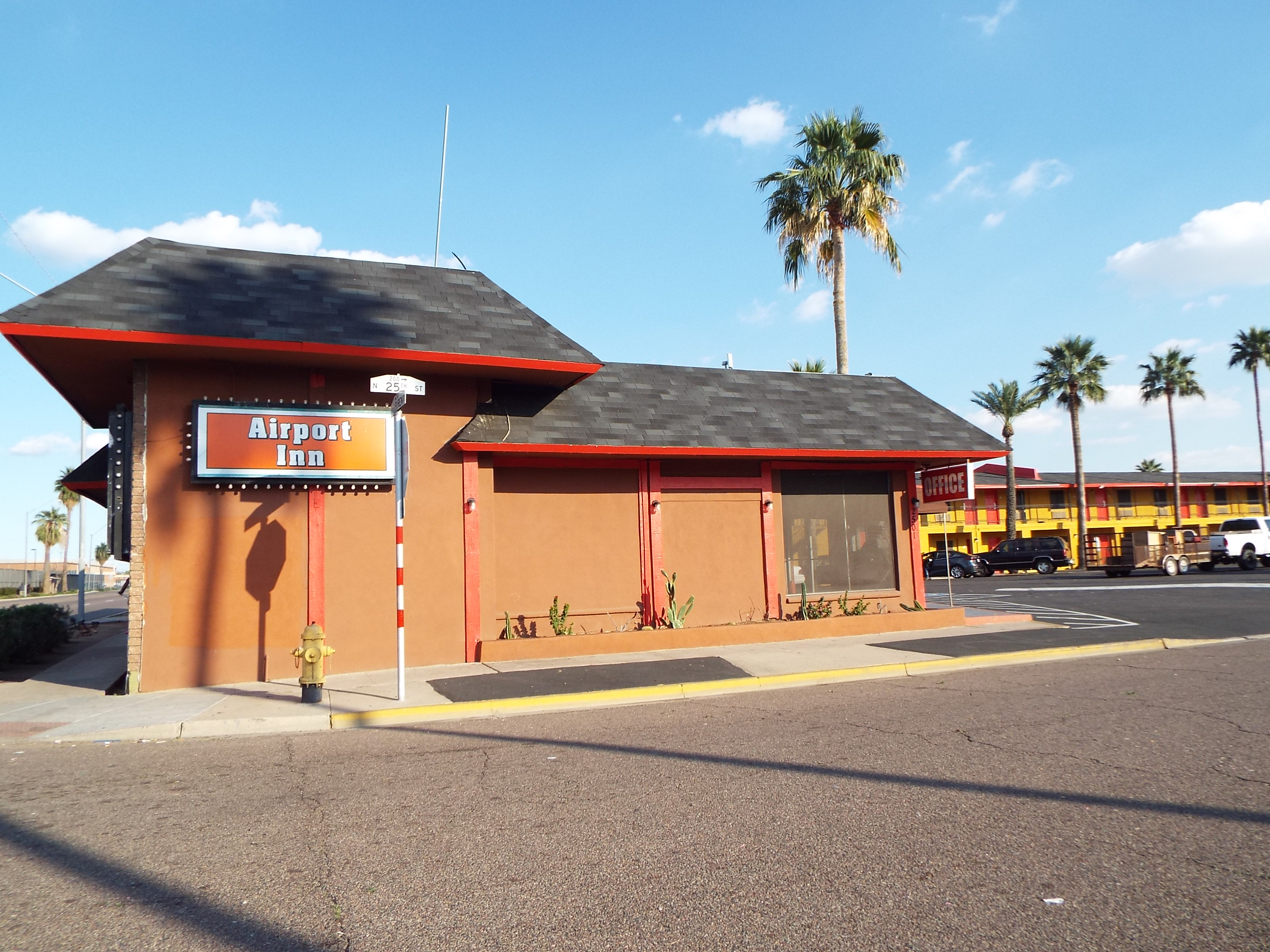
Airport Inn is located at 2501 East Van Buren St. on the land where Phoenix's first airport, the Van Buren Airport, once stood.

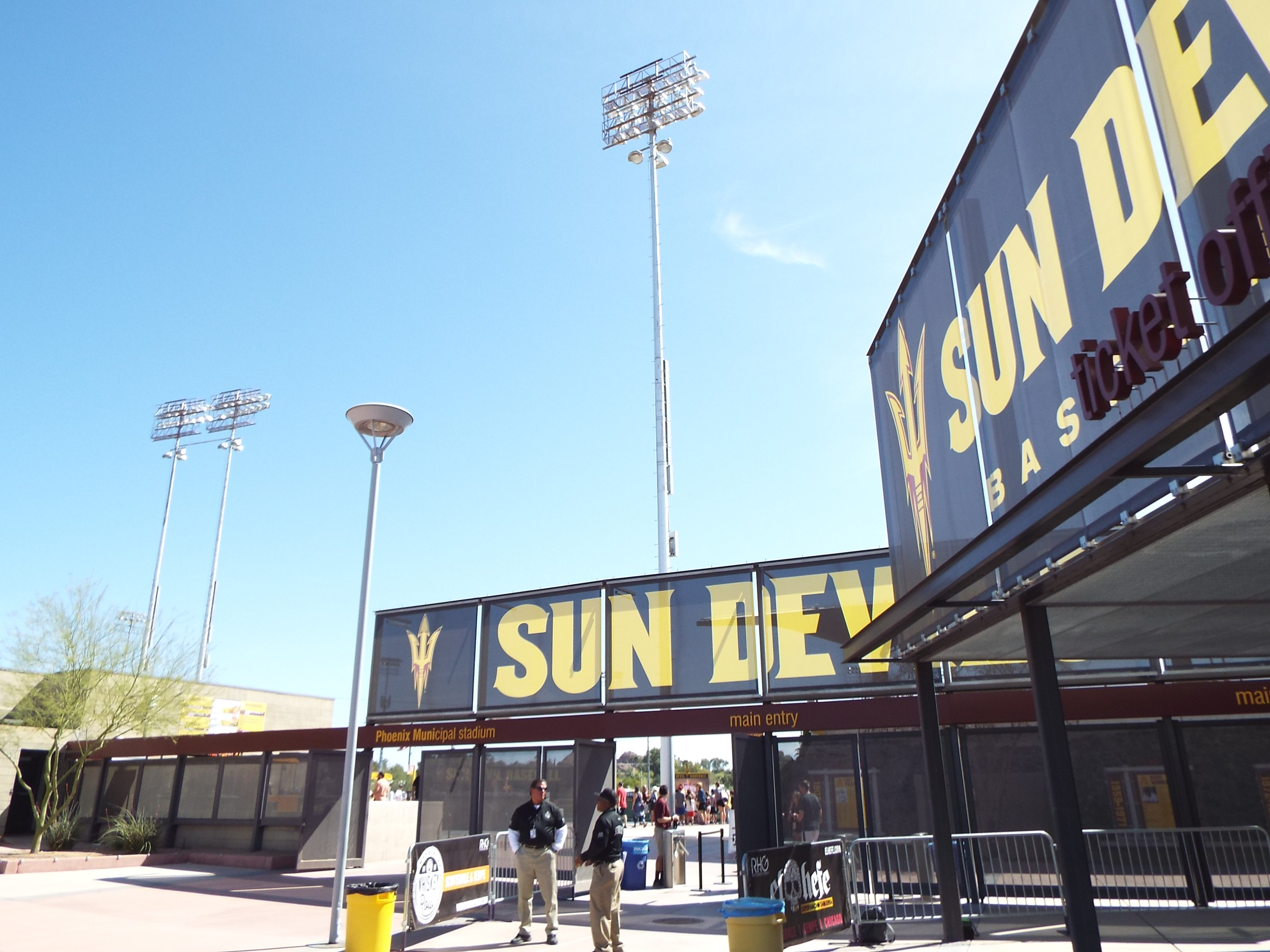
The main entrance of the Phoenix Municipal Stadium. The Phoenix Municipal Stadium was built in 1964 and is located at 5999 E. Van Buren Street in Phoenix. The stadiums’ light poles are the original light poles which were installed in New York's Polo Grounds Stadium in 1940. They served the stadium until 1964, when the stadium was demolished. Horace Stoneham, owner of the San Francisco Giants, whose club started spring training at the previous iteration of the Phoenix Municipal in 1947, had the poles shipped here. The San Francisco Giants played at the ballpark during the spring training of 1964.

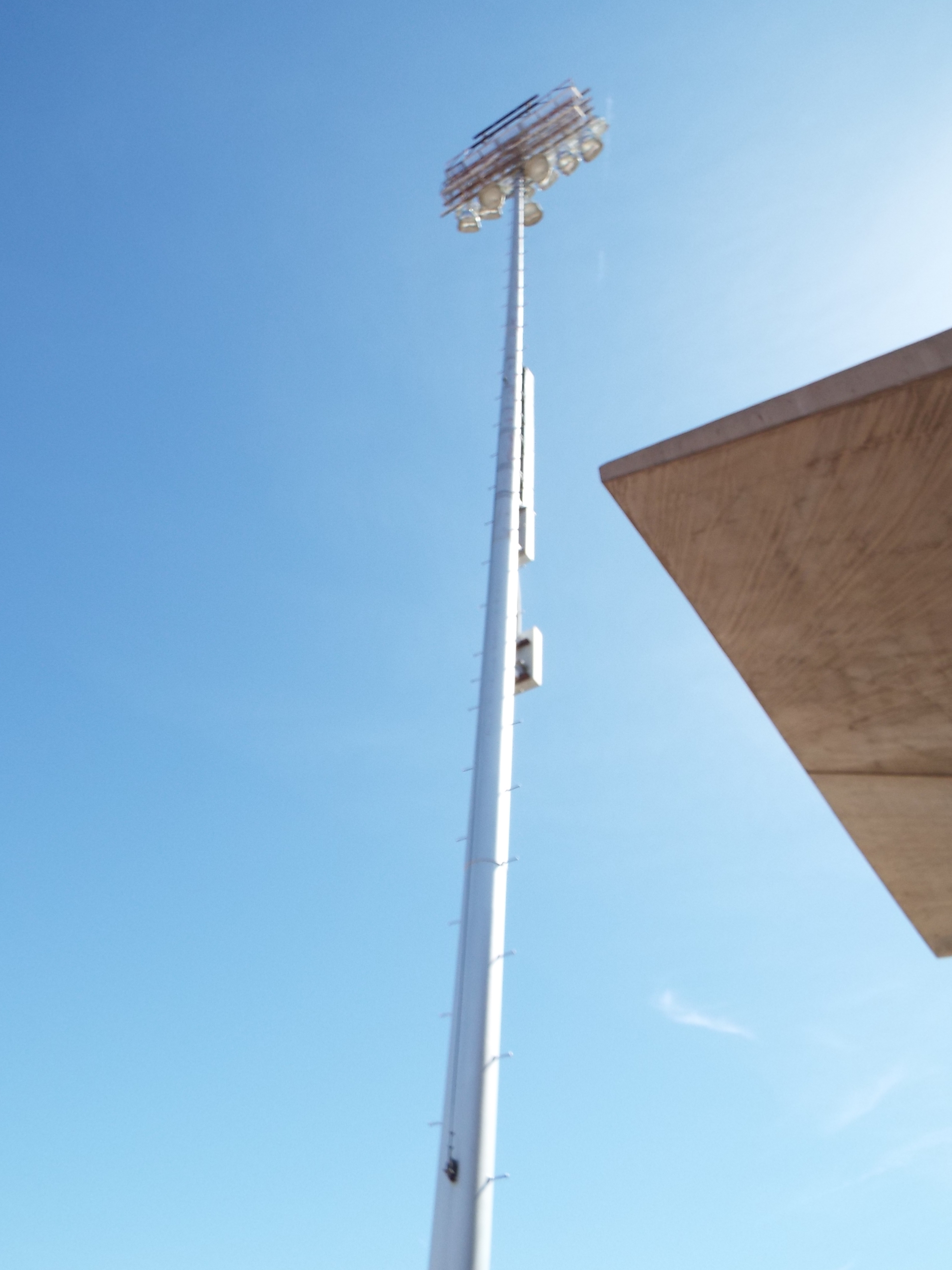
One of the Phoenix Municipal Stadium light pole . The light pole once served the Polo Grounds Stadium in New York. They were shipped to Phoenix after the Polo Grounds Stadium was demolished in 1964 and placed in the Phoenix Municipal Stadium where they still stand today.

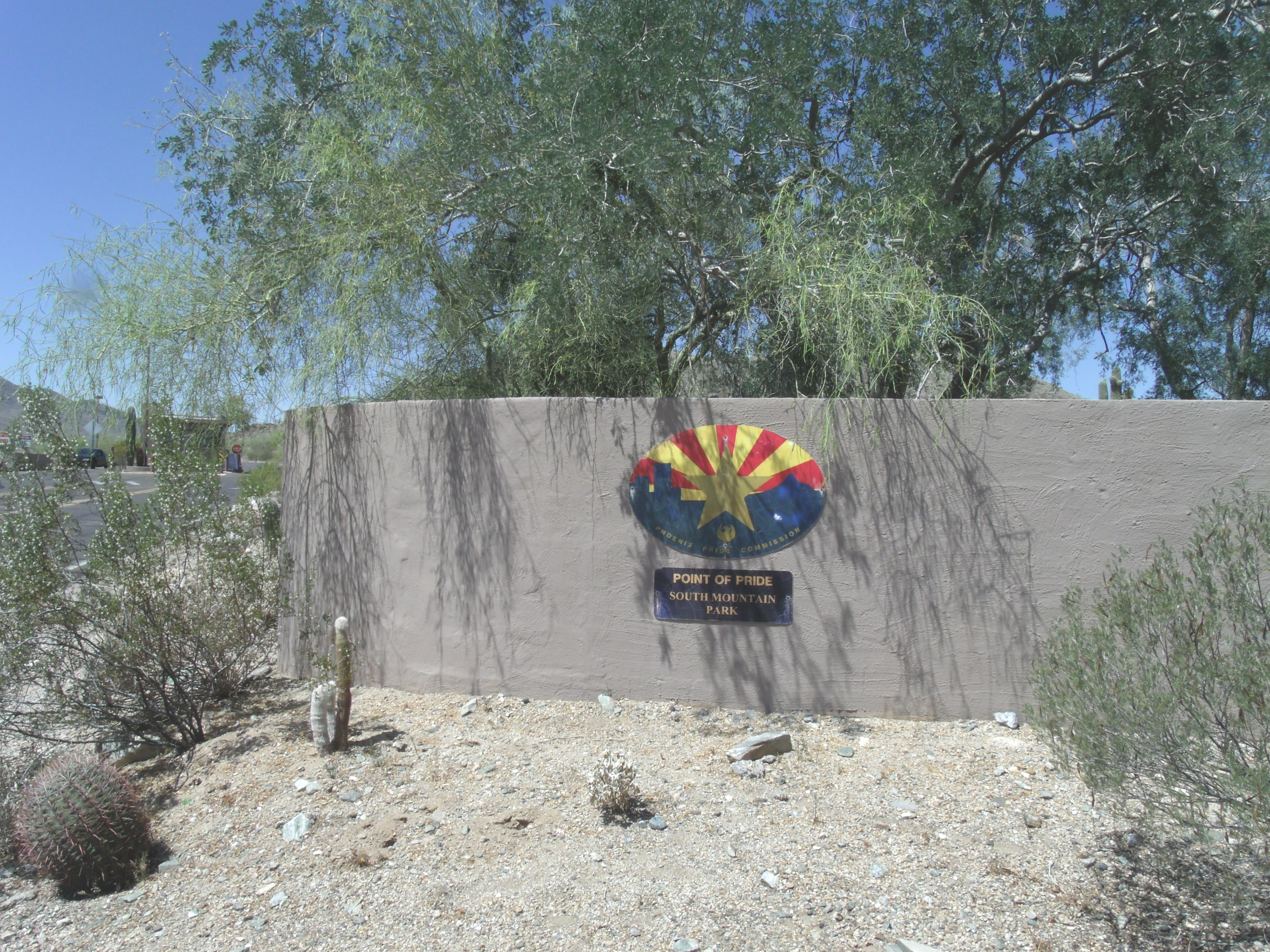
South Mountain Park & Preserves located south of Baseline Road extends as far as the alignment of Chandler Boulevard, between 48th Street on the east and 47th Avenue on the west. It was listed in the South Mountain Park & Preserves located south of Baseline Road extending as far as the alignment of Chandler Boulevard, between 48th Street on the east and 47th Avenue on the west. It was listed in the Phoenix Historic Property Register in October 1989.

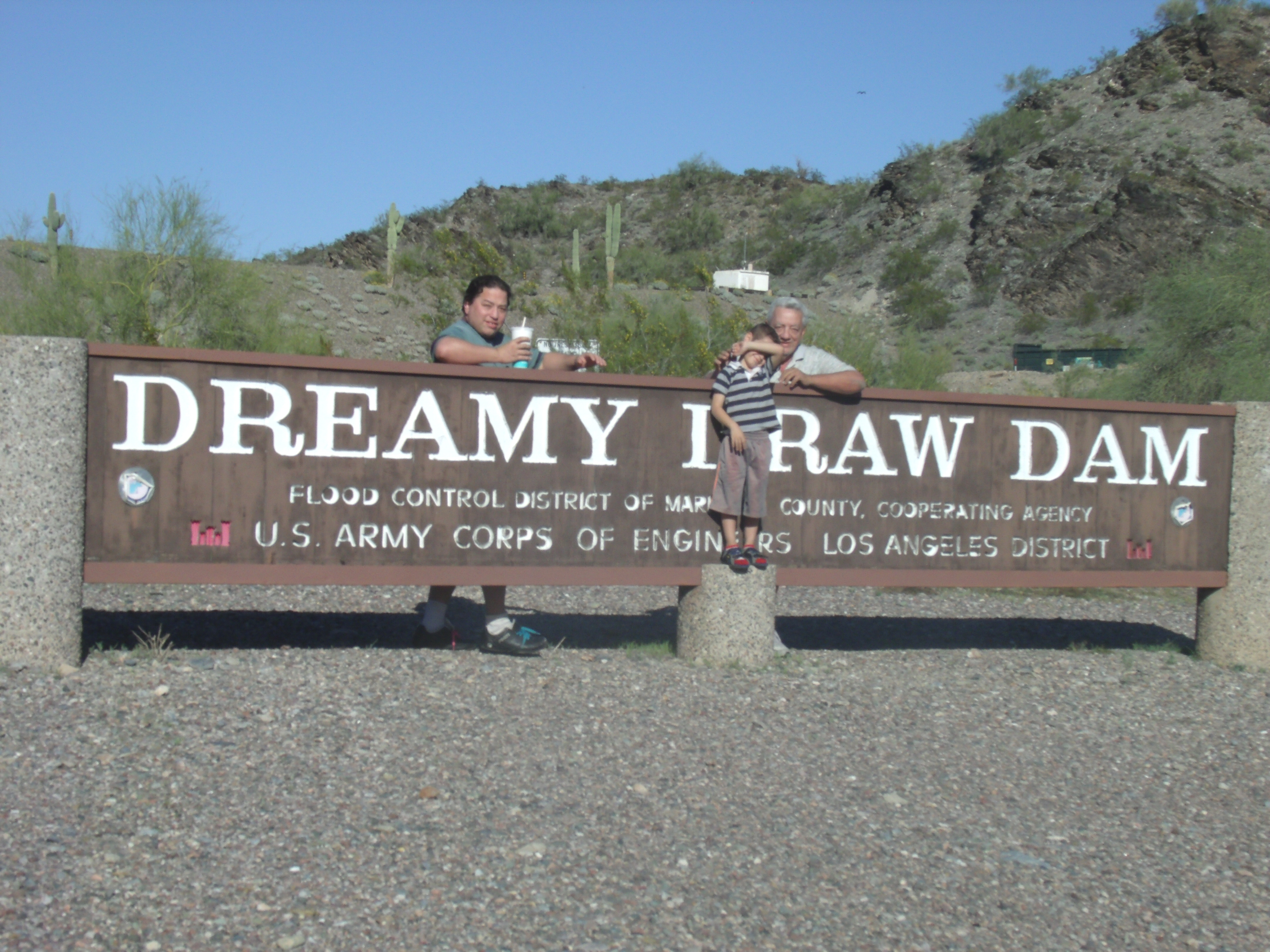
Dreamy Draw Dam is a compacted earthfill flood control dam and was the first of four dams built under the Phoenix, Arizona, and Vicinity plan. According to local legend Dreamy Draw Dam is supposedly a UFO crash site where in 1947 the Army Corps of Eng. used rock to cover up the crash site. Dreamy Draw Dam is located in the Phoenix Mountain Reserves at approximate 24th Street alignment, just east of Northern Avenue.

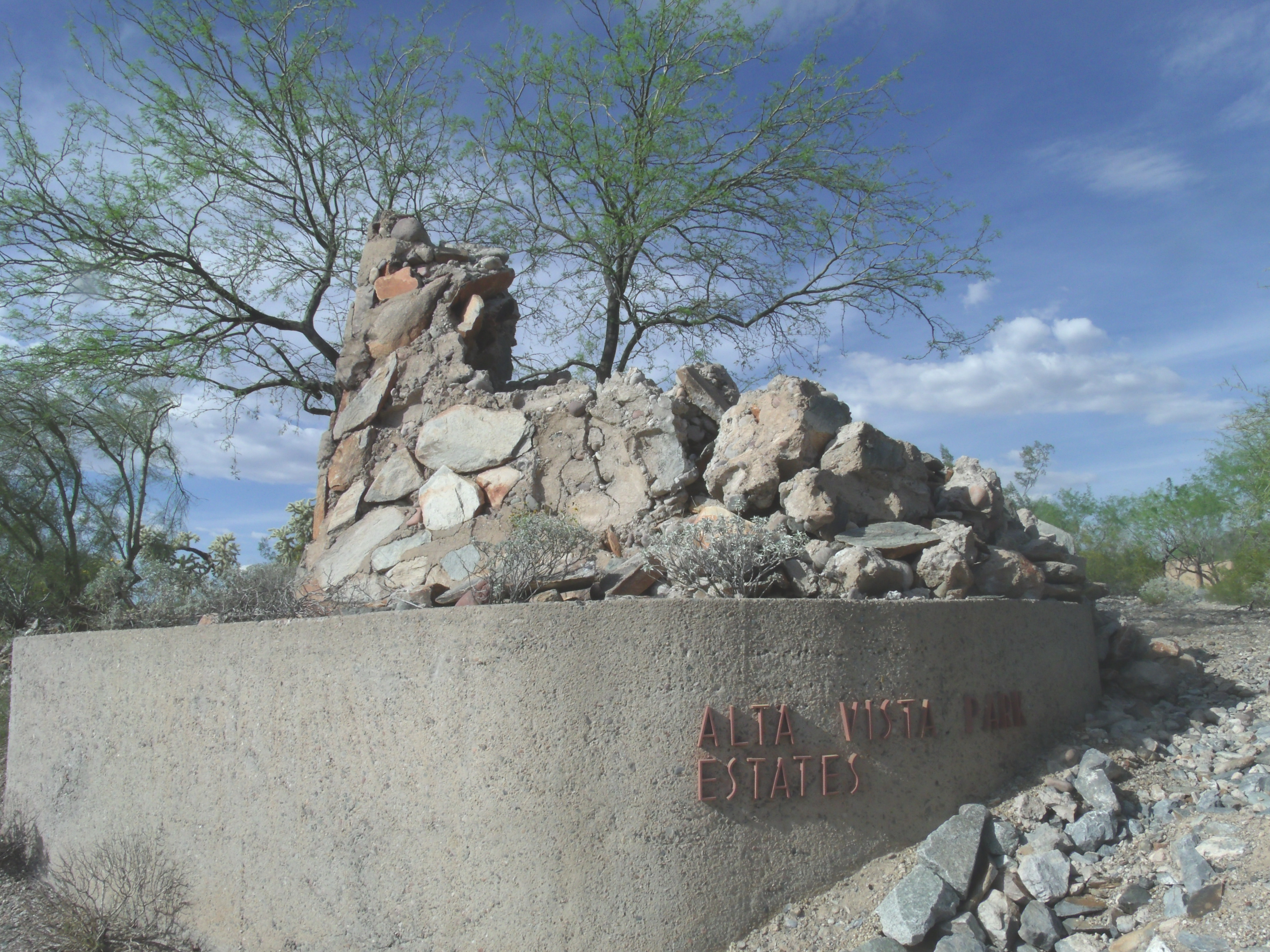
The chimney of the Rose Paulson House is the only thing that remains. The house was built in 1940 by Frank Lloyd Wright and was located on a hill by Camelback Road and Stanford Dr. The house caught fire in 1945 and what remains is the chimney that serves as part of the entrance to the Alta Vista Estates community.

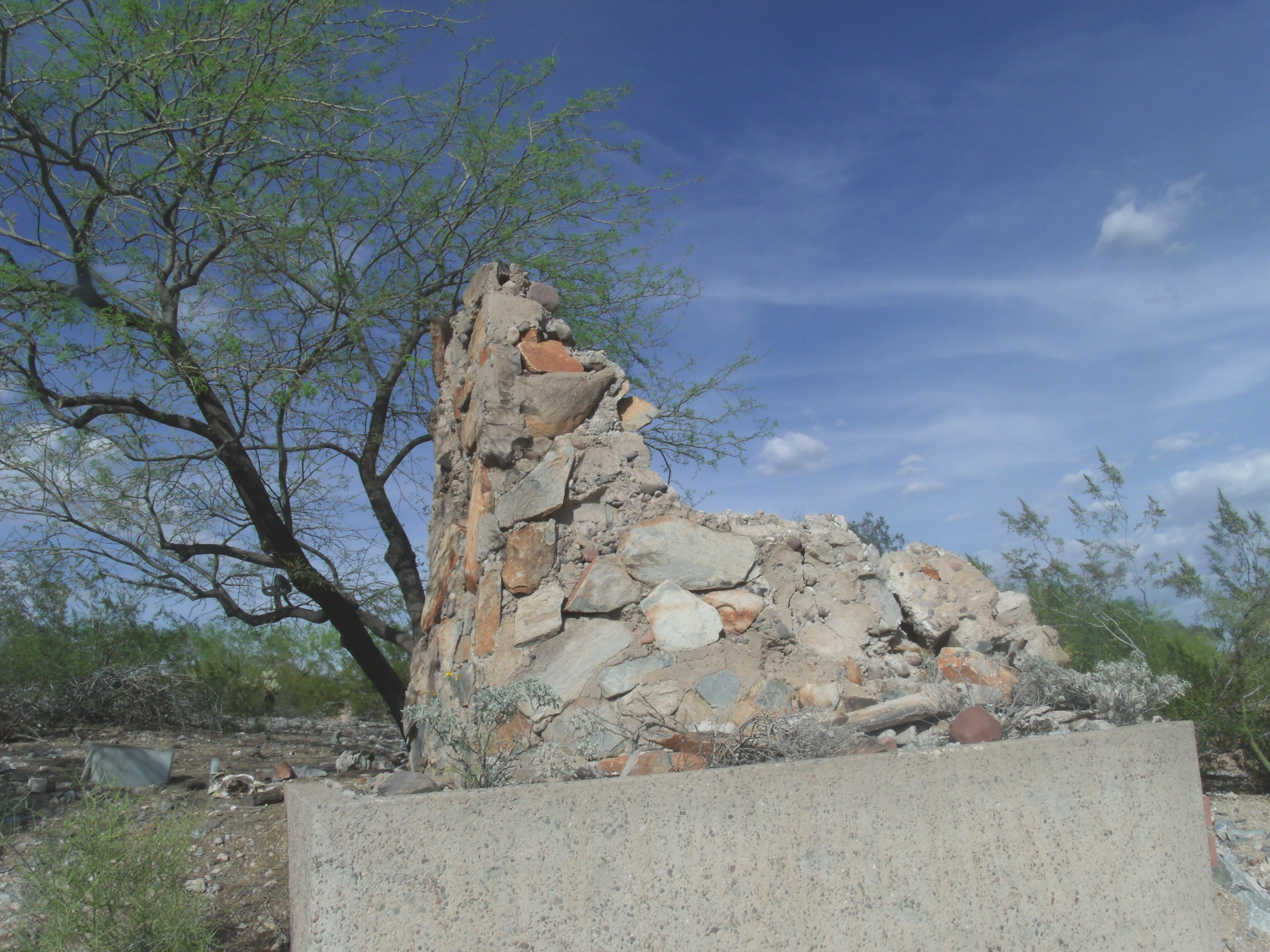
Different angle of the Rose Paulson House ruins – 1940

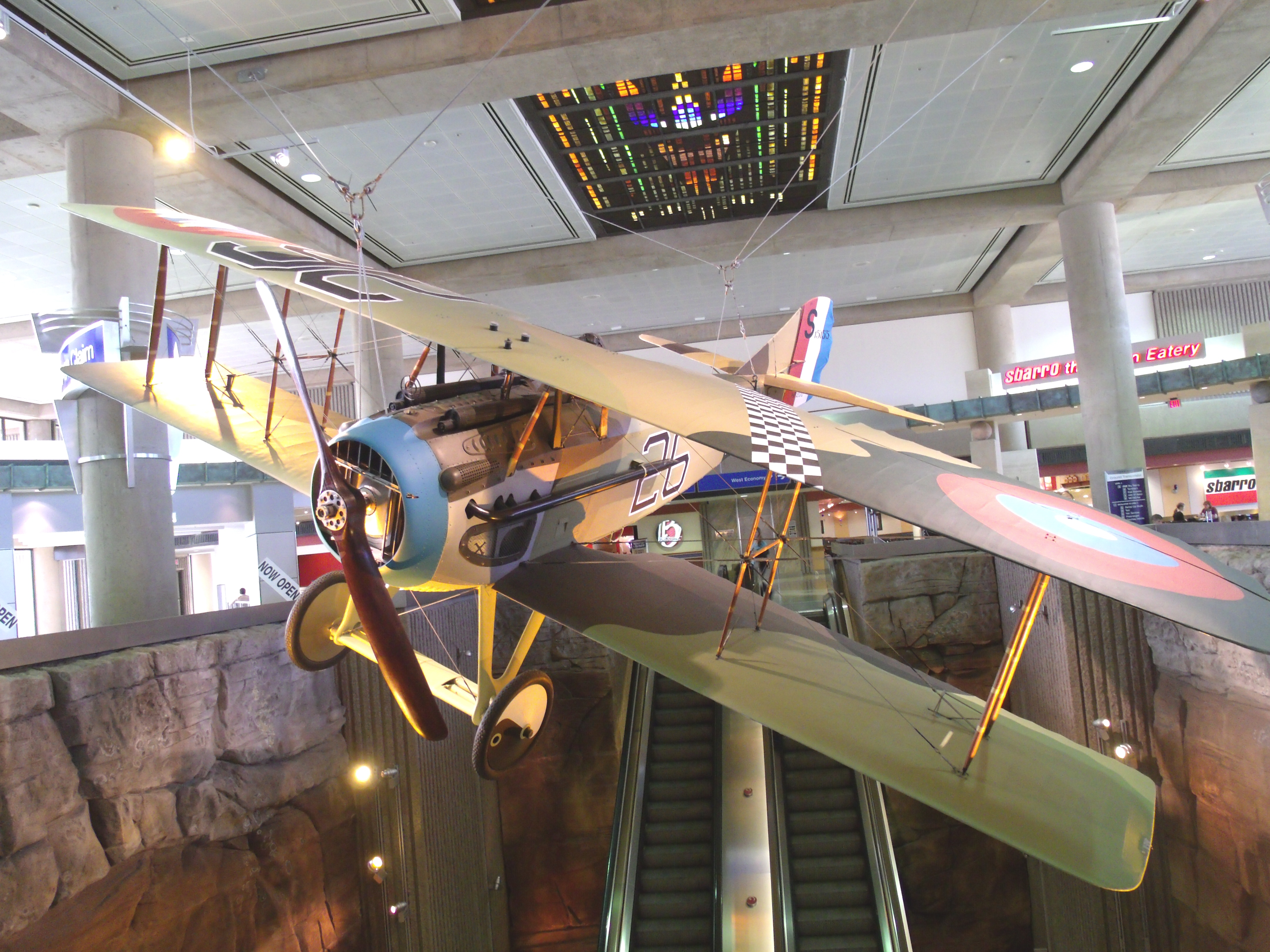
This is the SPAD XIII flown by Arizona native Frank Luke Jr., the first aviator awarded the Medal of Honor, the highest military decoration in the United States, in World War I. The plane has 80% of its original parts. The other 20% have been restored. It is one of five surviving today and is on display in the 44th Street Sky Train Station of Phoenix Sky Harbor International Airport.

L. Ron Hubbard's car, a 1947 Buick Super 8 . Hubbard founded the Church of Scientology. His house is listed in the National Register of Historic Places, ref: #09000953. The car is parked in the back of the property.

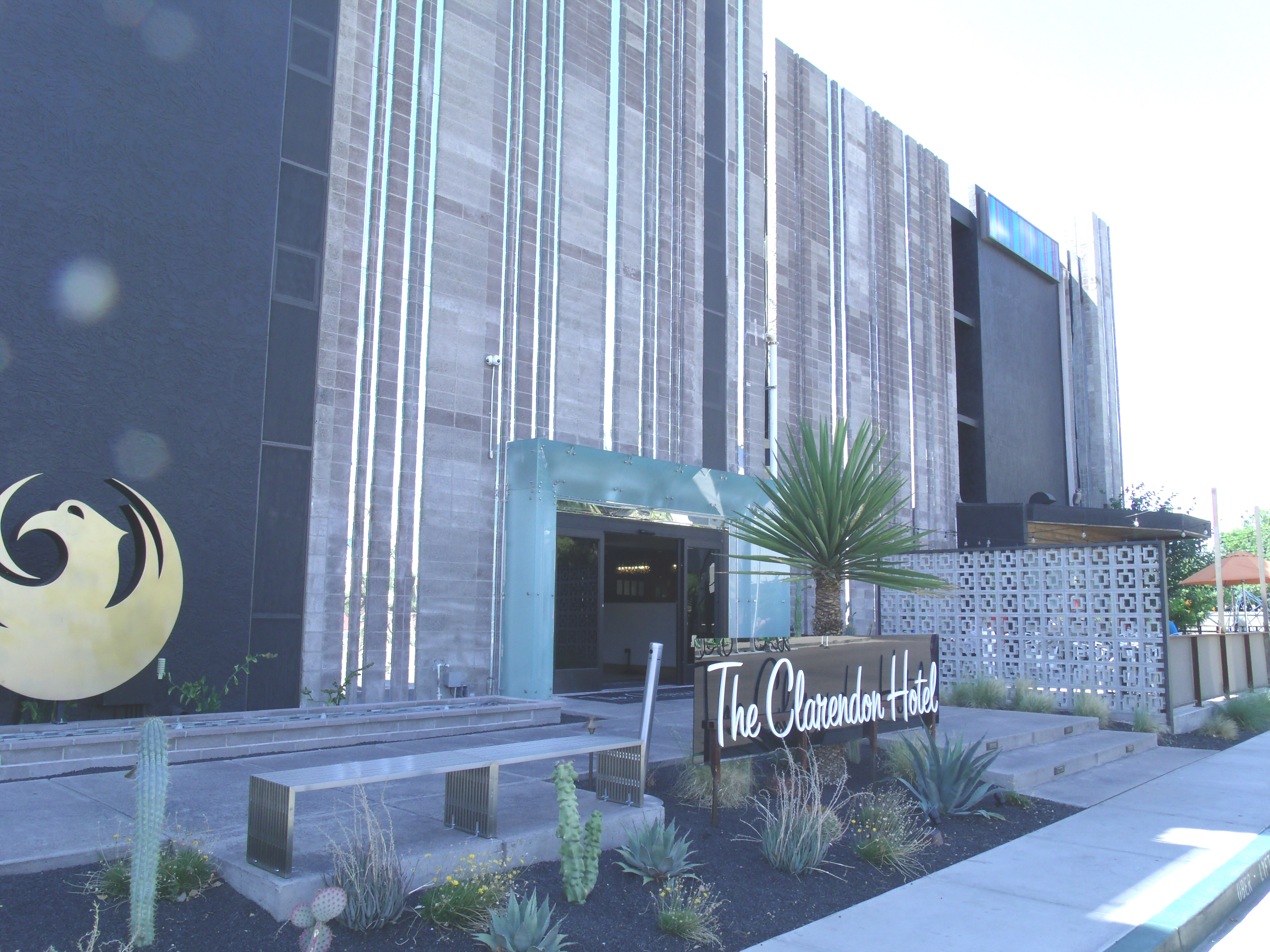
The Hotel Clarendon (now Clarendon Hotel) where on June 2, 1976, Arizona Republic journalist Don Bolles was supposed to meet with a prospective informant named John Harvey Adamson. The meeting never took place and instead Adamson placed six sticks of dynamite under Bolles car in the parking lot blowing the journalist to pieces. The hotel is located 401 W. Clarendon Dr.

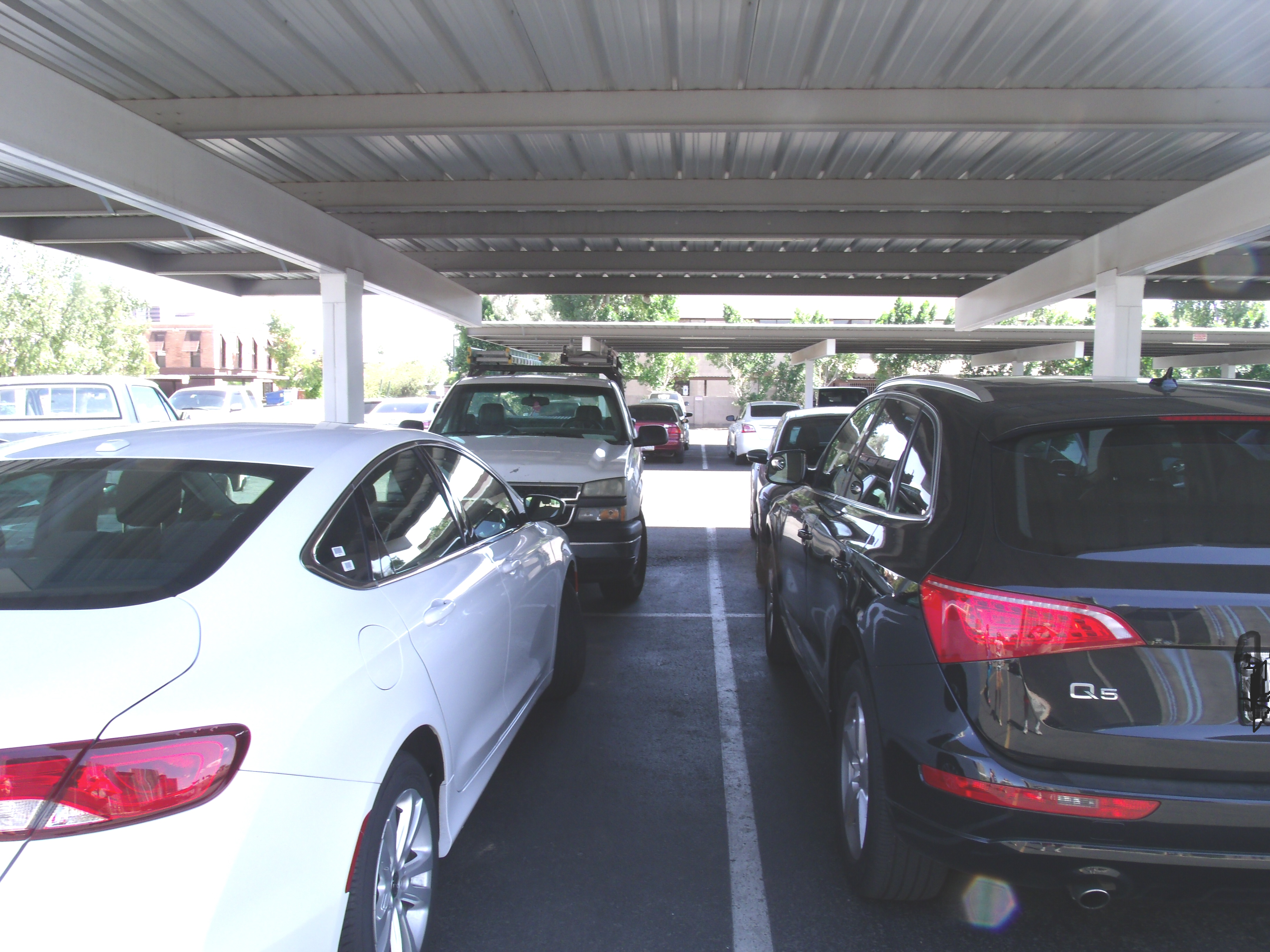
Parking space in the south parking area on 4th Avenue of the Hotel Clarendon (now called the Clarendon Hotel) where on June 2, 1976, Arizona Republic journalist Don Bolles was murdered. The parking space is now a covered parking.

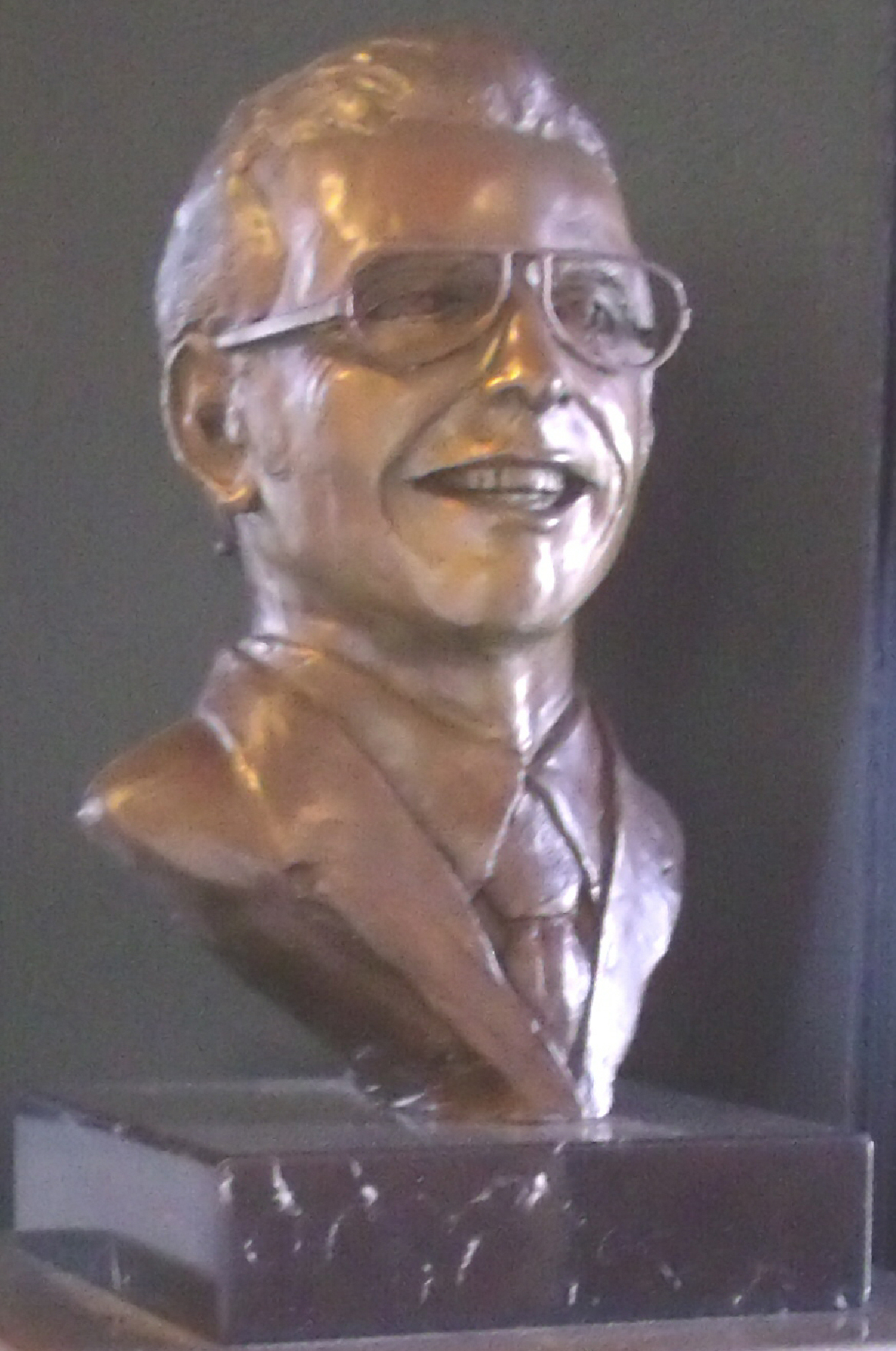
Hall in the Clarendon Hotel dedicated to Don Bolles.

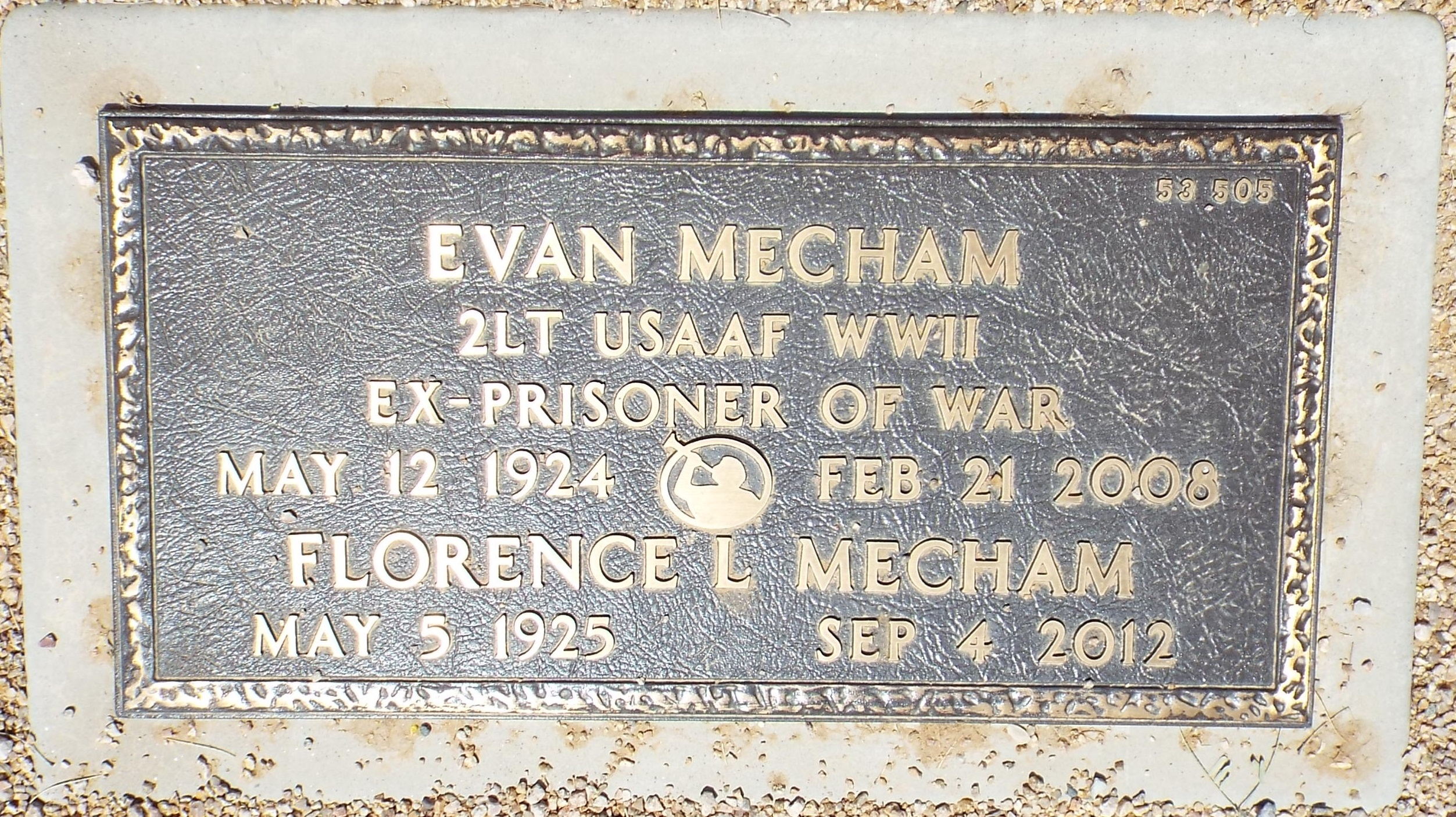
Grave site of Evan Mecham (1924–2008) and Florence L. Mecham (1925–2012). Evan Mechem served as the 17th Governor of Arizona from 1987 to 1988 when he was impeached. He is buried in the Section 53, site 505 of the National Memorial Cemetery of Arizona located at 23024 N. Cave Creek Road.

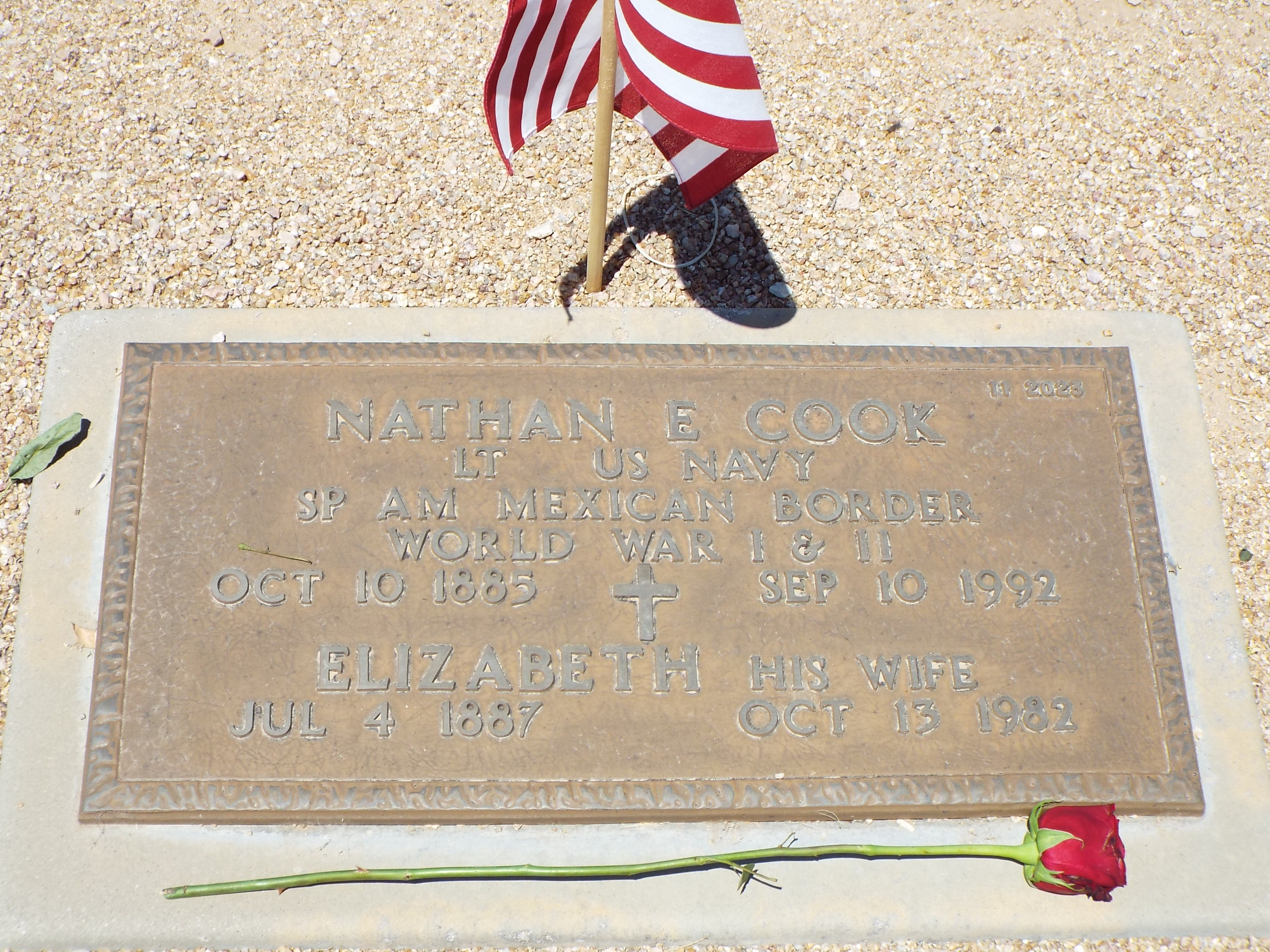
Grave site of Nathan Edward Cook (1855–1992) and his wife Elizabeth Cook (1887–1982). Cook was a sailor in the United States Navy during the Philippine-American War whose naval service continued through WWII. When he died at the age of 106, he was the oldest surviving American war veteran. He is buried in Section 11; Plot 2023.

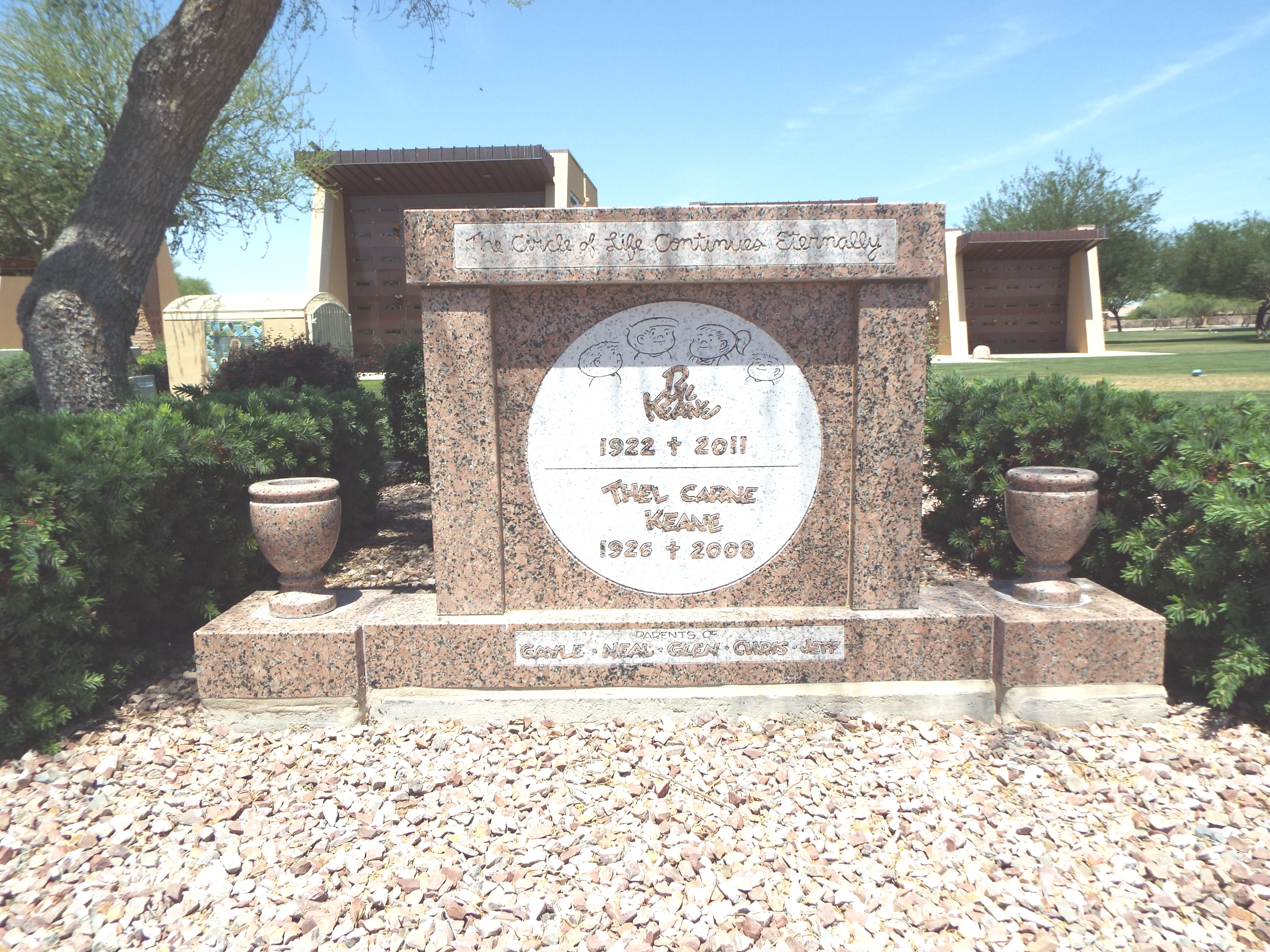
The grave of Bil and Thel Keane in the Holy Redeemer Cemetery. Bil was the creator of the cartoon "Family Circus".

== See also ==
- National Register of Historic Places listings in Phoenix, Arizona
- Phoenix Historic Property Register
- Pioneer and Military Memorial Park
- USS Arizona salvaged artifacts
- National Register of Historic Places listings in Maricopa County, Arizona
- Martin Auto Museum

Historic structures in Phoenix with articles

- Smurthwaite House
- El Cid Castle
- Windsor Hotel
- Squaw Peak Inn
