= Central Avenue Corridor =

Employment and residential corridor in Phoenix

Coordinates: 33.4926°N 112.0723°W

Central Avenue
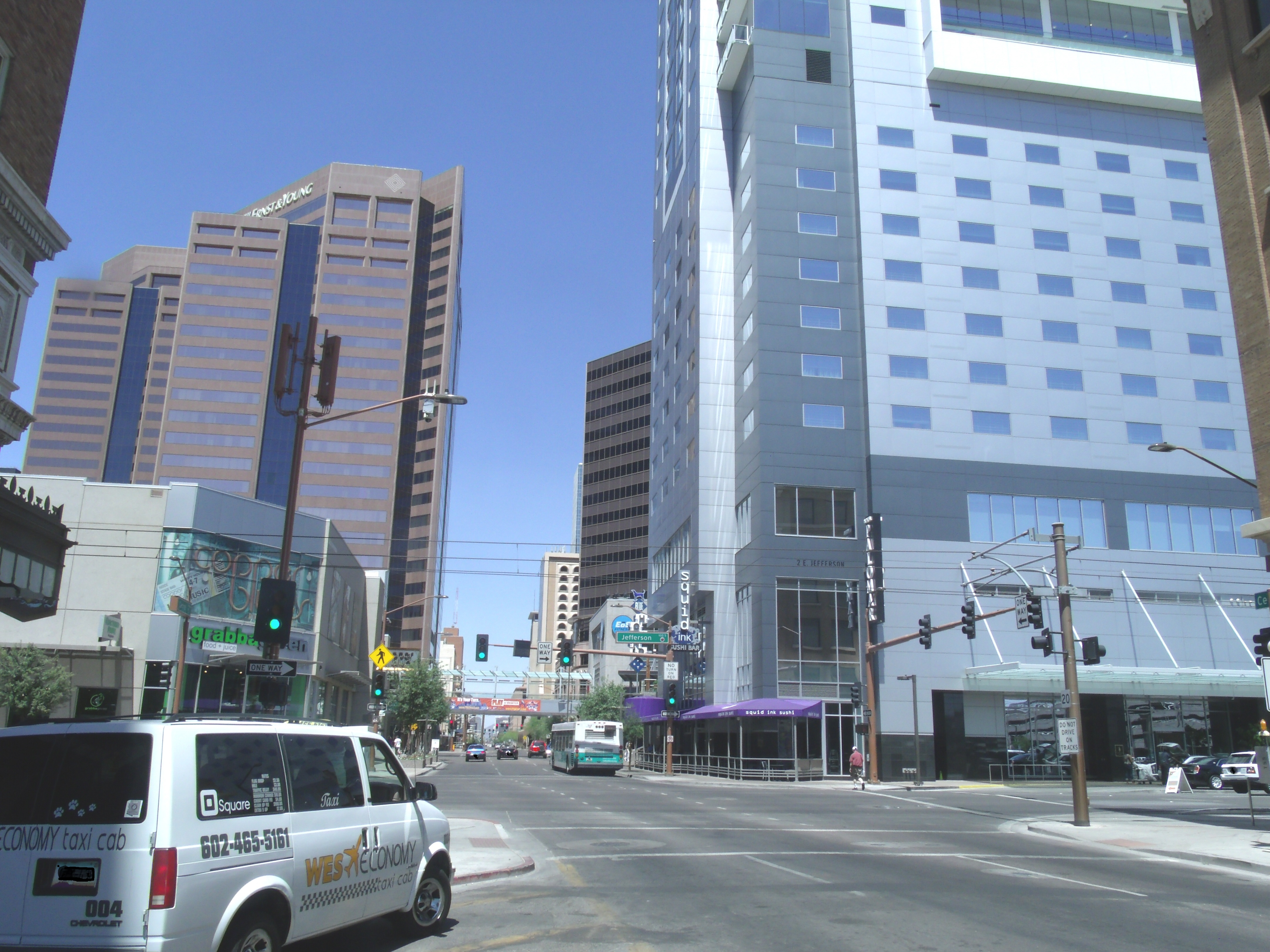
- Downtown Central Avenue in Phoenix
- Interactive map of Central Avenue
- Location: Phoenix
- North end: 10499 North (near Sunnyslope)
- South end: 11699 South (in South Mountain Park)

The Central Avenue Corridor is a significant stretch of north–south Central Avenue in Phoenix, Arizona. Roughly bounded by Camelback Road to its north, and McDowell Road to its south, this is one of Phoenix's most vital and heavily trafficked stretches of roads. It is also one of the region's largest centers of employment, with nearly 60,000 people being employed within a three-mile (5 km) radius of this swath of Central Avenue. Major employers here include major banks and financial institutions, hi-tech companies, and several significant law firms and government agencies.

This corridor bisects a larger area known as Midtown, Phoenix—the collection of neighborhoods north of downtown, and south of the North-Central and Sunnyslope areas. Block numbers or addresses for Central Avenue landmarks are indicated in parentheses where available.

== Central Avenue Corridor today ==
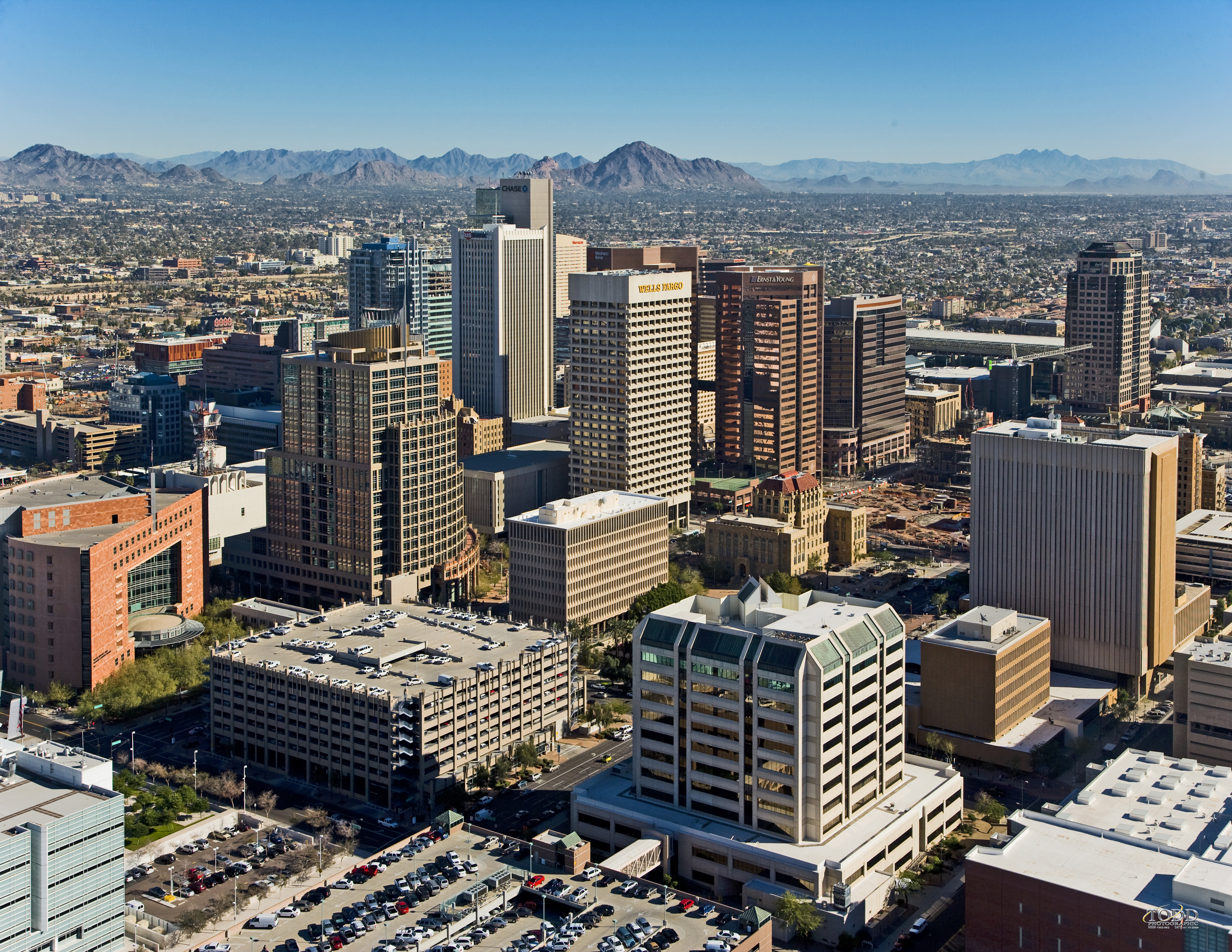
Central Avenue Corridor from Madison St. looking northeast

Located halfway between the major arterial roads 7th Street and 7th Avenue, Central Avenue is the east–west dividing line for Phoenix as well as other Maricopa County cities that do not have their own addressing system.

Central Avenue crosses every economic stratum in Phoenix, rather abruptly in places. Downtown Phoenix land values are on par with other major cities. North of Midtown and Uptown Phoenix, the large, old homes in the tony North Central neighborhoods hark back to lower North Central Avenue's past. On the other side of the canal from North Central, at Central Avenue's dead-end, is the Sunnyslope District, founded in 1907. South of downtown, approaching South Mountain, the South Central area contains some of the most blighted neighborhoods in the city.

Central Avenue represents almost every architectural use and style found in Phoenix. Dilapidated and thriving strip centers, small old brick warehouses, industrial and commercial properties, single family homes and estates, and many of the city's high-rises all have Central Avenue addresses. On Central or in the immediate vicinity lie officially recognized and protected historic neighborhoods and a variety of cultural, performance, and sporting venues.

== History ==
=== Pre–World War II ===
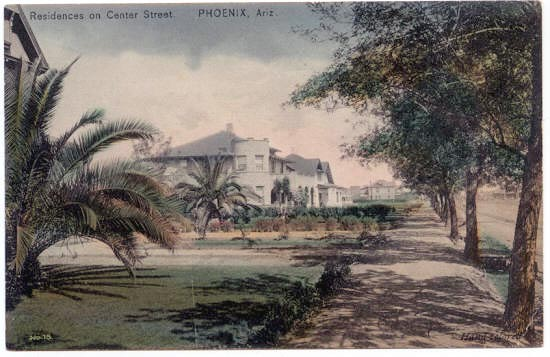
Center Street in 1908

Central Avenue was originally named Center Street upon Phoenix's founding with the surrounding north–south roads named after Indian tribes. The original Churchill Addition of 1877, covering a small area north of Van Buren Street to what is presently Roosevelt Street, was the first recorded plat showing Central Avenue with its present name. Despite this, there is evidence of it being called Center Street into the 1930s. A replat of Phoenix's original townsite in 1895 was the first to officially show numbered streets and avenues starting from the east and west sides of Central.

Phoenix's first school was built on Center Street and Monroe in 1874 as a one-room adobe. A new four-room schoolhouse replaced it in 1879 as the fourth brick building in the city, and the school was expanded again in 1893. By 1919, the school had deteriorated considerably and was condemned and sold. The luxurious Hotel San Carlos, the first downtown hotel to feature air conditioning and elevators, opened on that spot in 1928 after a long delay. The Phoenix Indian School was established in 1891 giving Indian School Road (4100 N) its namesake. Near North Mountain, architect William Robert Norton subdivided the first parts of Sunnyslope in 1911 amidst a "squatters' community of asthmatics and tuberculosis patients" whose makeshift dwellings were illegal in the city proper.

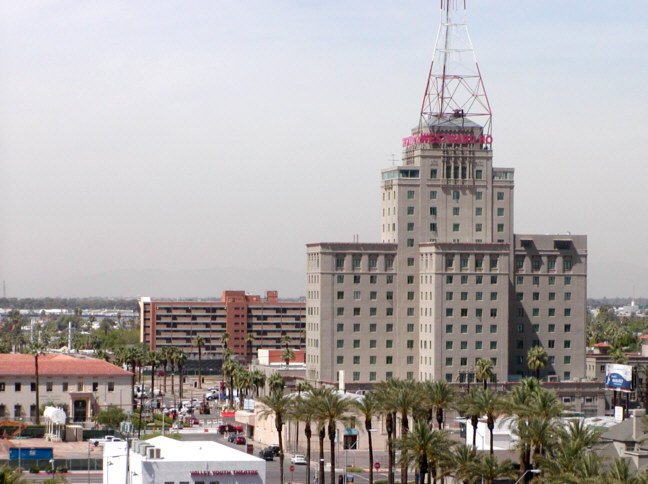
The Westward Ho, a Phoenix landmark.

By 1917, a mile-long bridge was open over the immense Salt River ultimately connecting downtown with South Mountain, then known as Salt River Mountain. The Westward Ho was constructed in 1927 and would remain the city's tallest building until 1960. Brophy College Preparatory (4701 N) opened for the first time in 1928 amidst agricultural fields. The Heard Museum (2301 N) opened in 1929 with little fanfare but would grow to be a highly respected institution of Native American culture and history.

=== 1950s ===
As Phoenix sprawled north, developers found plenty of available land on Central Avenue and began capitalizing on the cachet of the youthful city's signature boulevard. Local steakhouse legend Durant's (2611 N) opened in 1950 and has changed little other than that patrons today enter the restaurant through the back off the parking lot as celebrities and other socialites once did back then. Park Central Mall (3110 N) replaced a dairy farm in the middle part of the decade, signaling the beginning of downtown's long decline as retail stores and malls opened away from the city center. America's second McDonald's restaurant was built near Indian School Road in 1953. It was the first McDonald's franchise, the first to feature the Golden Arches, and served as a model for Ray Kroc's Illinois store. These early commercial developments foreshadowed the trend towards autocentrism on Central Avenue and indeed the rest of the city. The first major high-rise built on Central Avenue outside of downtown was the Phoenix Towers (2201 N), erected in 1957. The Phoenix Art Museum moved to Central Avenue in 1959. Phoenix fully annexed Sunnyslope, at Central's north terminus, that year. Central Avenue to its southern terminus, South Mountain, where minorities had been historically redlined, was annexed a year later.

=== 1960s ===
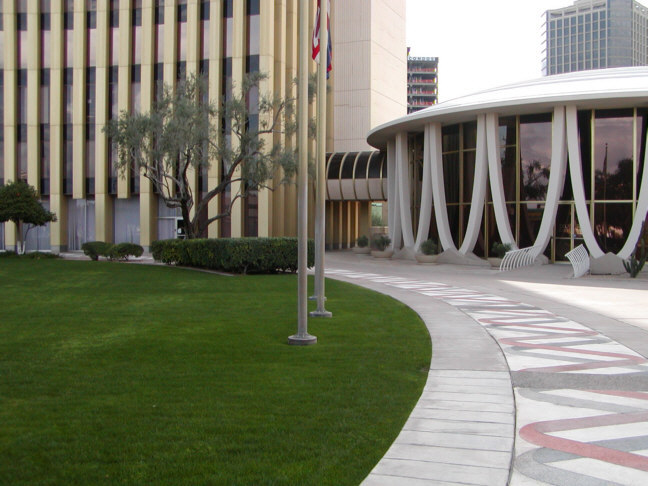
Phoenix Financial Center.

The 1960s brought a wave of high-rise development in Phoenix to Central Avenue that the city had hardly seen in its modern history. In 1960 the Phoenix Corporate Center opened, which at 341 feet (104 m) became the tallest building in Arizona. The first phase of the Rozenweig Center, known today as Phoenix City Square, was completed in 1964. Architect Wenceslaus Sarmiento's largest project, the landmark Phoenix Financial Center (3443 N, better known by locals as the "Punch-card Building" in recognition of its unique southeastern facade) was also first finished in 1964 for banker and developer David Murdoch. Eight floors were added four years later. In addition to a number of other office towers, most of Phoenix's residential high-rises, such as the Landmark on Central (4750 N, then known as Camelback Towers), Executive Towers (207 W. Clarendon) and the Regency On Central (ROC) (2323 N, then known as Regency Apartments), were built during this decade.

=== 1970s ===
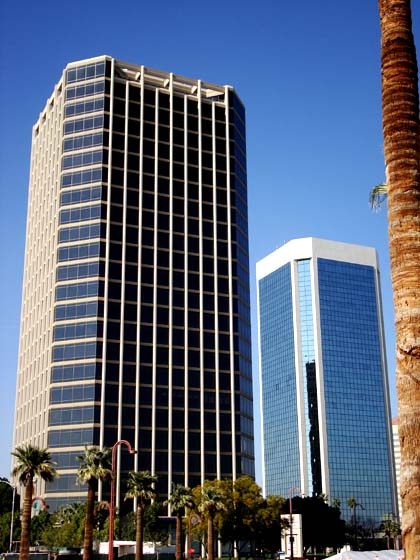
The Great American Tower and 3300 Tower, completed in 1985 and 1980.

In 1971, Phoenix cemented the precedent of previous ad hoc zoning decisions with the adoption of the Central Phoenix Plan, which envisioned unlimited building heights along Central Avenue. The new plan, however, did not sustain long-term development of the Central Corridor. Only a few office towers were constructed along North Central during this decade and none approached the scope of projects constructed during the previous decade. Instead, downtown resurged in popularity during the 1970s, witnessing a flurry of construction activity not seen again until the urban real estate boom of the 2000s. In 1979, Phoenix adopted the Phoenix Concept 2000 plan which split the city into urban villages—each with its own village core where greater height and density is permitted, further shaping the free-market development culture. Phoenix officially turned from its roots as a city built around its two main drags to a city of many nodes later connected by freeways. The cluster of high-rises north of Thomas Road became part of the Encanto village core.

=== 1980s ===
Development on North Central Avenue began anew in the 1980s as part of that decade's real estate boom with a second wave of office towers. One Camelback was built in 1985 at the intersection of Central and one of Phoenix's other signature streets, Camelback Road. It is likely the last structure to be built that tall that far north, thus capping the build-out potential of the Central Avenue skyline almost five miles (8 km) from the origin downtown. The Phoenix Indian School was closed in 1988 and remained vacant for years. The city's third-tallest building at 397 feet (121 m), Qwest Tower, opened in Phoenix Plaza in 1989 on Thomas Road (2900 N).

=== 1990s ===
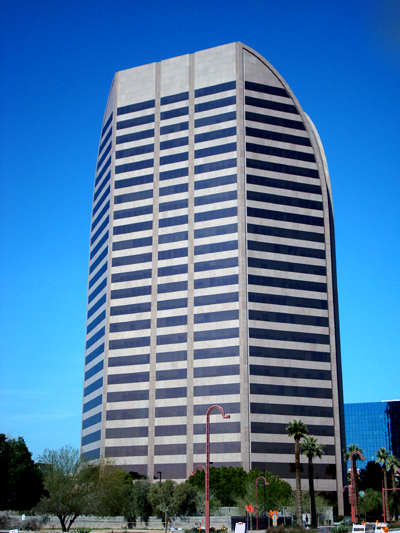
The Viad Tower, completed as the Dial Tower in 1991. The building design resembles a bar of Dial soap.

Phoenix adopted the Arts District plan in 1992 in an attempt to interconnect lower Midtown's cultural amenities in a walkable area, but the private development that the plan anticipated never arrived, though Burton Barr Central Library (1221 N) opened in 1995. The savings-and-loan boom that birthed new towers for Midtown Phoenix plagued it throughout the economic doldrums of the 1990s. The city's fifth-tallest at 374 feet (114 m), the Viad Tower (1850 N) opened in 1991 as the Dial Tower, isolated between the Downtown and Midtown skylines and the last new tower constructed in Midtown Phoenix. Floorplans of office towers built in previous decades had become functionally obsolete and contributed heavily toward Midtown's high vacancy rates. Despite the recession, the swank Biltmore area surrounding 24th Street and Camelback Road began to eclipse the Central Corridor as the Phoenix metropolitan area's premiere office destination with mid- and low-rise developments such as the Camelback Esplanade. The 1990s were unkind to Central Phoenix's oldest section, and a renewed interest in the central city developed, focused on new residences instead of offices.

=== 2000s ===
After numerous failed initiatives, Phoenix voters approved the Transit 2000 Regional Transportation Plan which dedicates a percentage of funds raised through a 4/10-cent (four cents on ten dollars) sales tax to build the Valley Metro Rail line. The 20-mile (32 km) initial phase, which opened for service in late December 2008. The A Line runs from the Downtown Phoenix Hub then east Washington Street en route to Tempe and Mesa. Gilbert Road/Main Street station. The B Line runs from the Metro Parkway station, to Camelback, down Central, On Central Avenue, there are seven stops in Midtown and Uptown Phoenix and three in Downtown Phoenix then the line goes south to South Phoenix to the Baseline/Central Avenue station. The three-year construction process commenced in late 2005, with the final rail being laid in late April 2008.

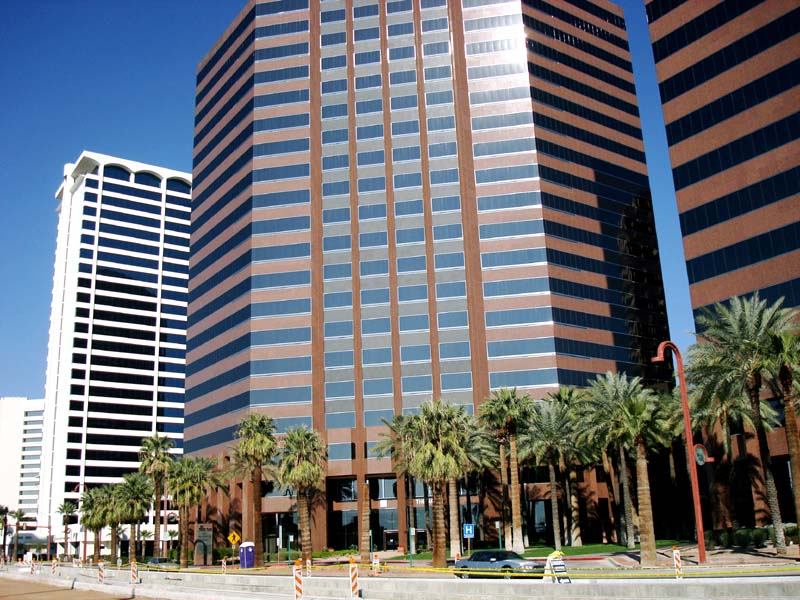
Skyscrapers and light rail construction on Central Avenue, February 2008.

The alignment of light rail down the center of Central permanently reshaped its physical layout and impacted the future of the surrounding neighborhoods. Light rail influenced growth as Phoenix adopted transit oriented development zoning standards in 2003 within 1/2 mile of stops, rendering an autocentric Central Avenue a thing of the past.

In Midtown, the market responded with two new mid-rise projects, the Artisan Lofts (1326 N), which opened in 2004 and the Tapestry on Central (2302 N), which opened in 2007. Tapestry's construction brought down the second-to-last estate home in the Central Avenue Corridor; the 1917 Ellis-Shackelford House (1242 N) still remains north of Margaret T. Hance Park.

Capitalizing on its retro mid-1960s styling, Camelback Towers became the Landmark on Central in 2004, continuing a tradition of the city's few apartment towers becoming ownership condominia later on. Also that year, Century Plaza (3225 N), originally built in 1974 as offices, had a complete exterior and interior remodel as part of its conversion to condominiums. As reconstruction continued, two additional floors were started in 2007. Century plaza is now known as "One Lexington".

Steele Indian School Park opened in November 2001 on the site of the old Phoenix Indian School five years after an intricate three-way land exchange involving the Barron Collier Company and the federal government. In Phoenix, Collier received a 15-acre (61,000 m^{2}) portion on the southwest corner of the site for long-term investment in addition to the Downtown block on which the Collier Center was built.

== Gallery ==
The north and south sides of the Central Avenue Corridor of Phoenix are lined with historical houses and buildings. These are the images of those properties. Some are listed in the National Register of Historic Places and some are listed in the Phoenix Historic Properties Register. There are also some historic properties which are listed in both registers.

Historic properties in Central Avenue Corridor
(NRHP = National Register of Historic Places)
(PHPR = Phoenix Historic Property Register)
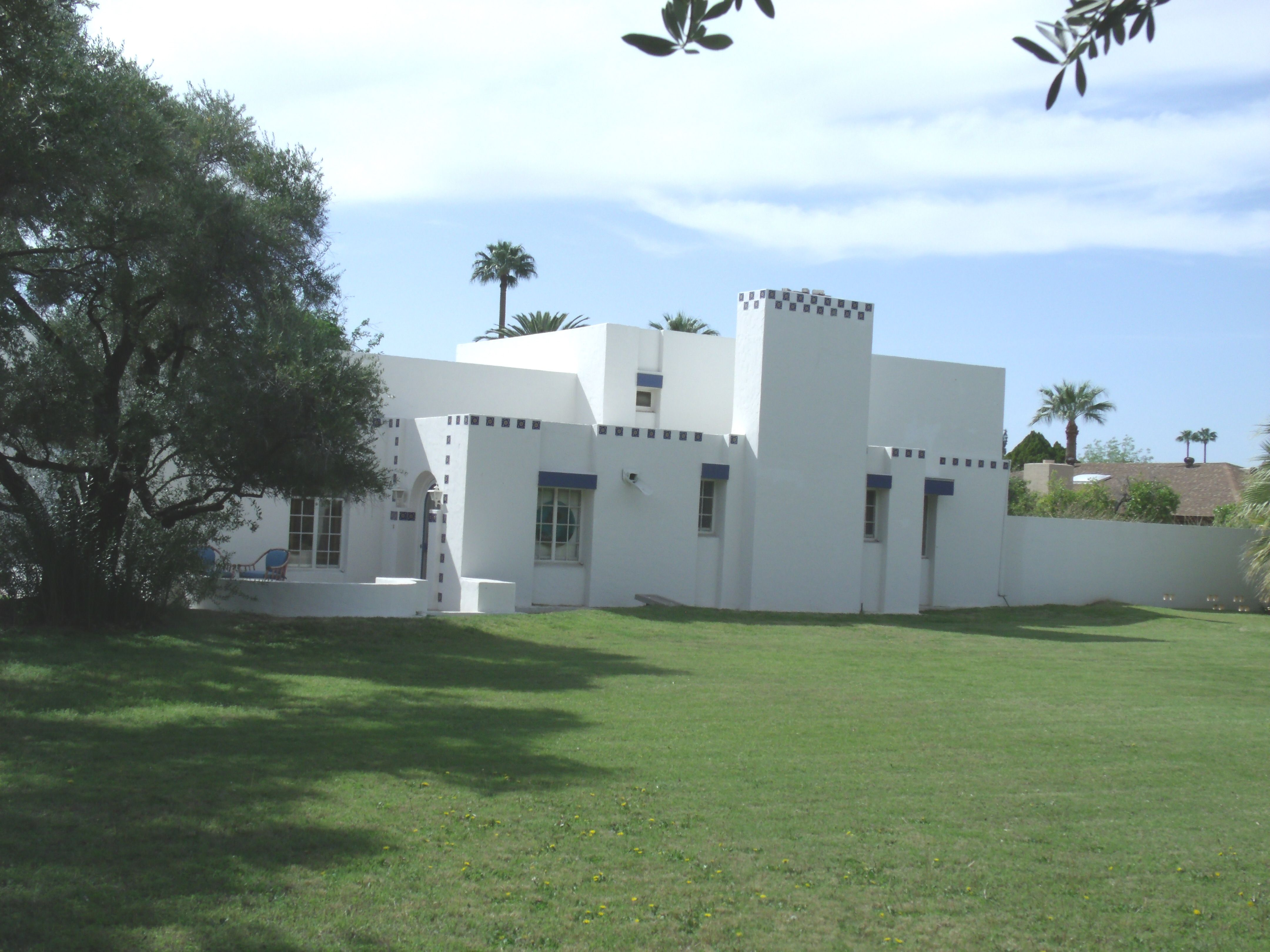
The David Morgan-Earl A. Bronson House was built in 1927 and is located at 8030 N. Central Ave. (NRHP).

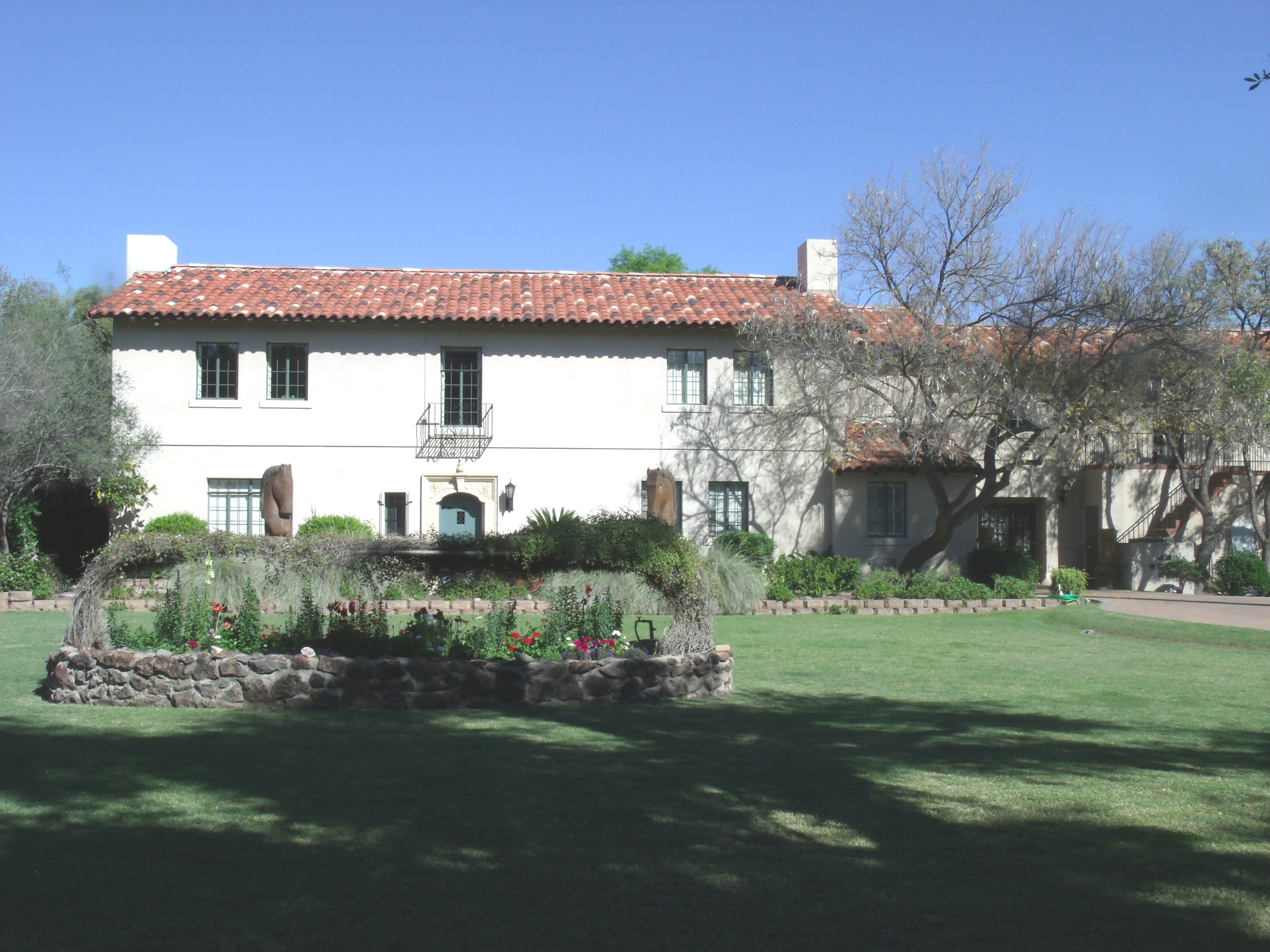
The Asbury-Salmon House was built in 1934 and is located at 7801 N. Central Ave. This house was built by Cline Asbury who managed the Crystal Ice and Cold Storage in Phoenix, founded by his brother Harry. Cline died in 1942 and in 1945 his wife Delia sold the house to Riney Salmon. The Salmon family lived in the house until 1970, when Mr. Salmon died of injuries received in an auto accident. At the time of his death, his firm was said to be the largest law firm in the state. The house was listed in the Phoenix Historic Properties Register in March 2003. It was listed in the National Register of Historic Places on April 8, 2010.

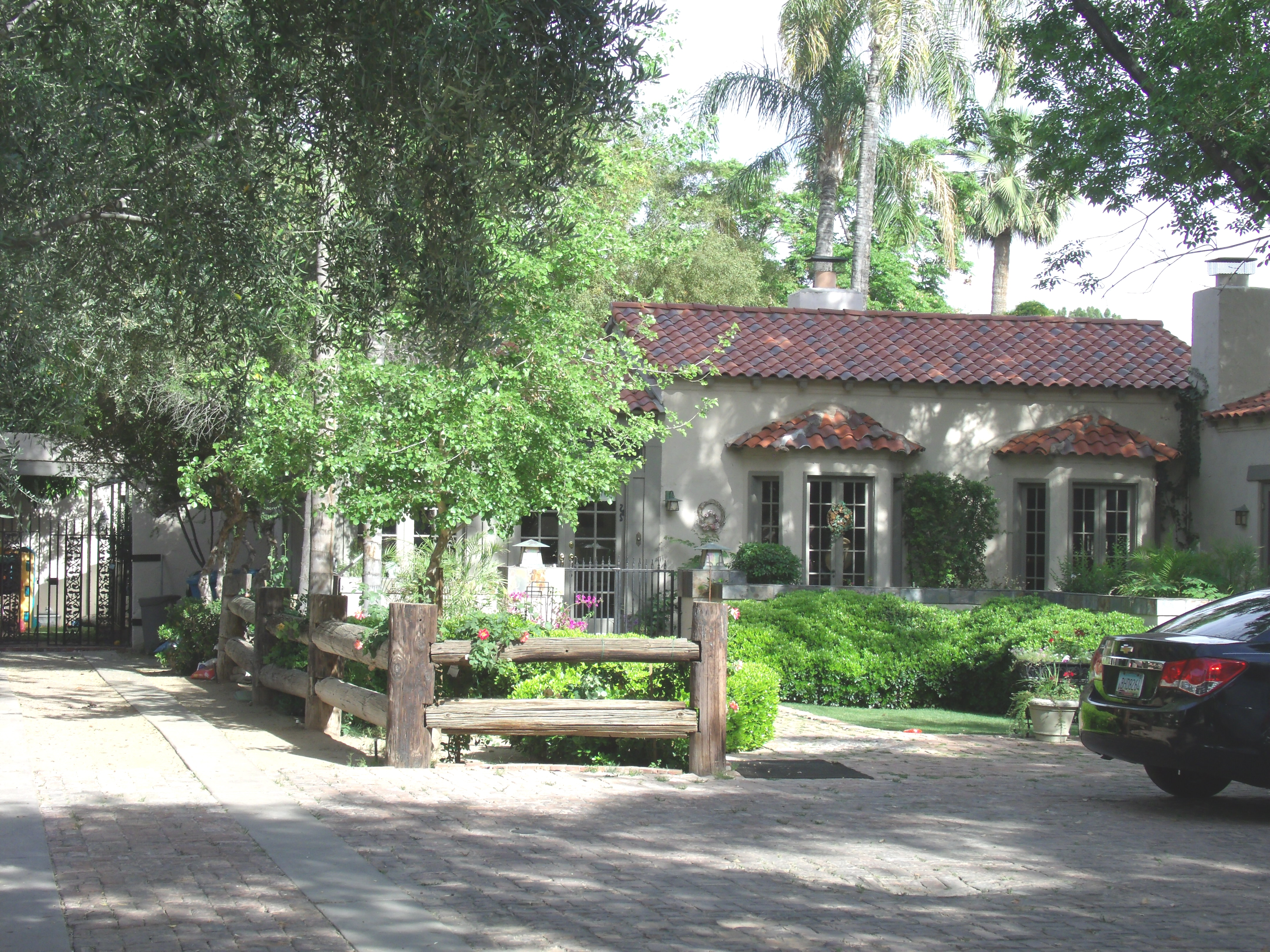
The Dr. Jean S. Holloway House was built in 1928 and is located 7215 N. Central Ave. It was listed in the Phoenix Historic Properties Register in November 2005.

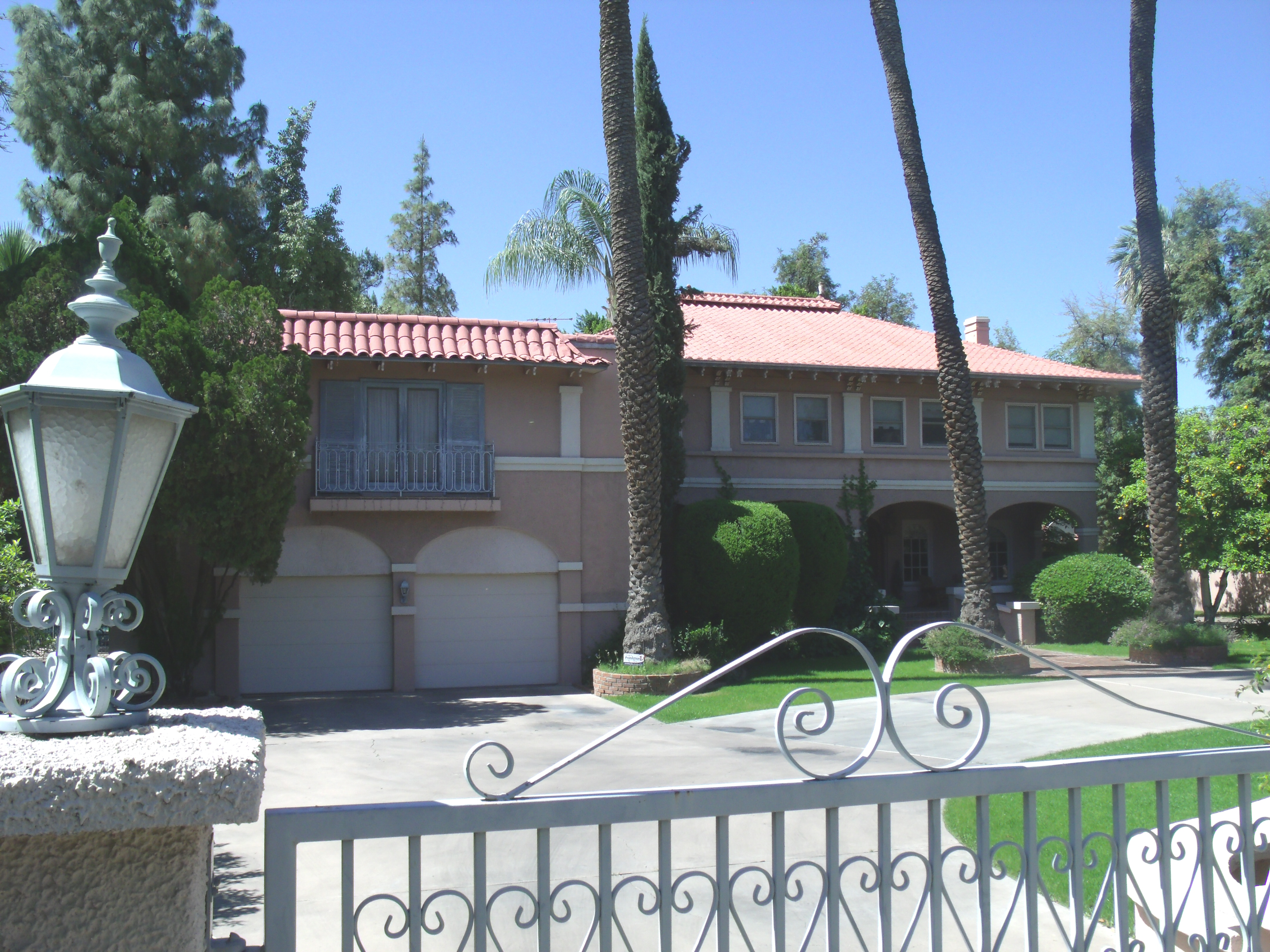
The Halm-Howard House was built in 1906 and is located at 6850 N. Central Ave. It was listed in the Phoenix Historic Properties Register in November 2005 and in the National Register of Historic Places on January 24, 2011, reference #10001161.

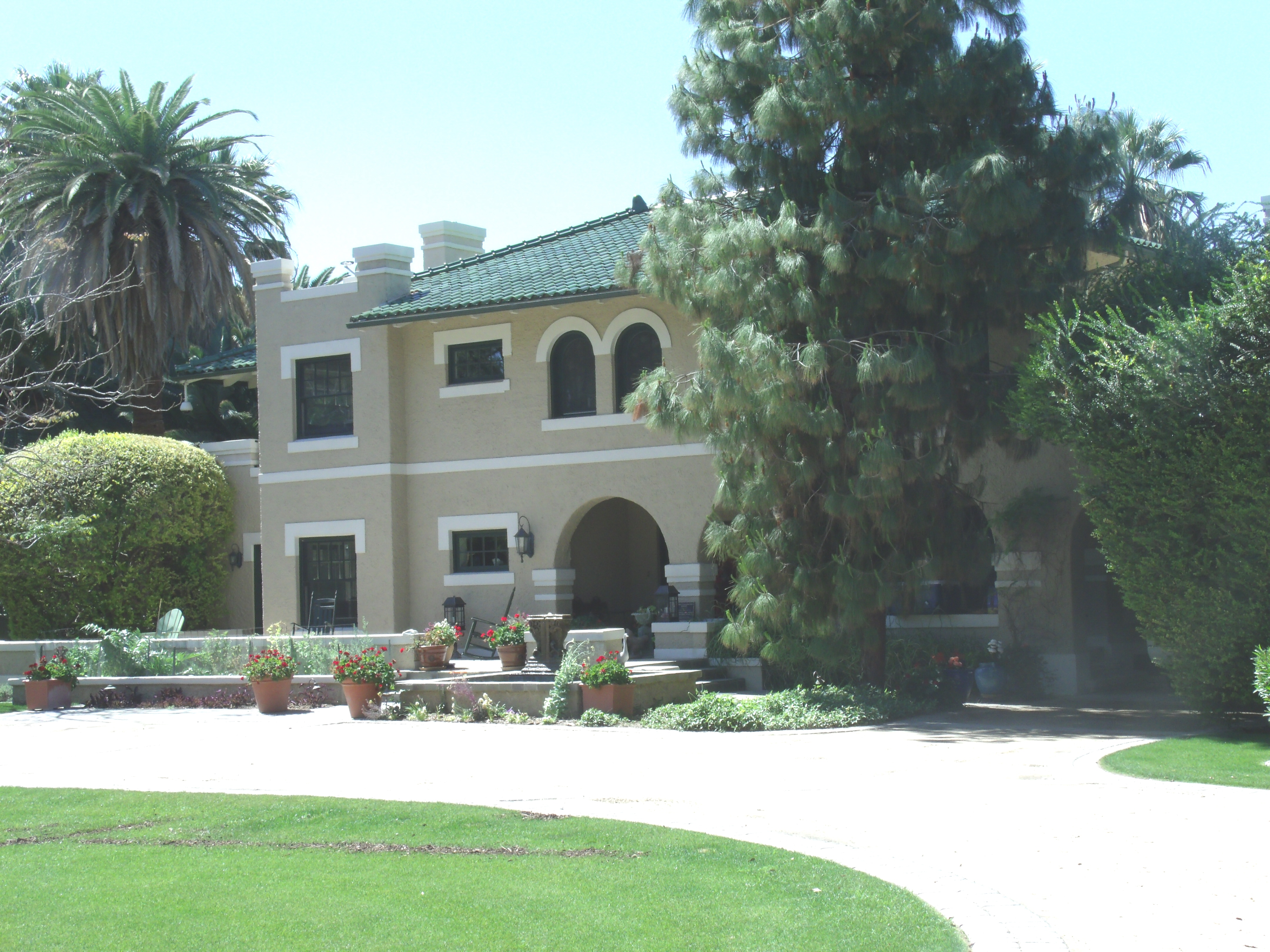
The Olney-Ellinwood House was built in 1912 and is located at 6810 N. Central Ave. It was listed in the Phoenix Historic Properties Register in March 2003. It was listed in the National Register of Historic Places on April 8, 2010. reference #10000155.

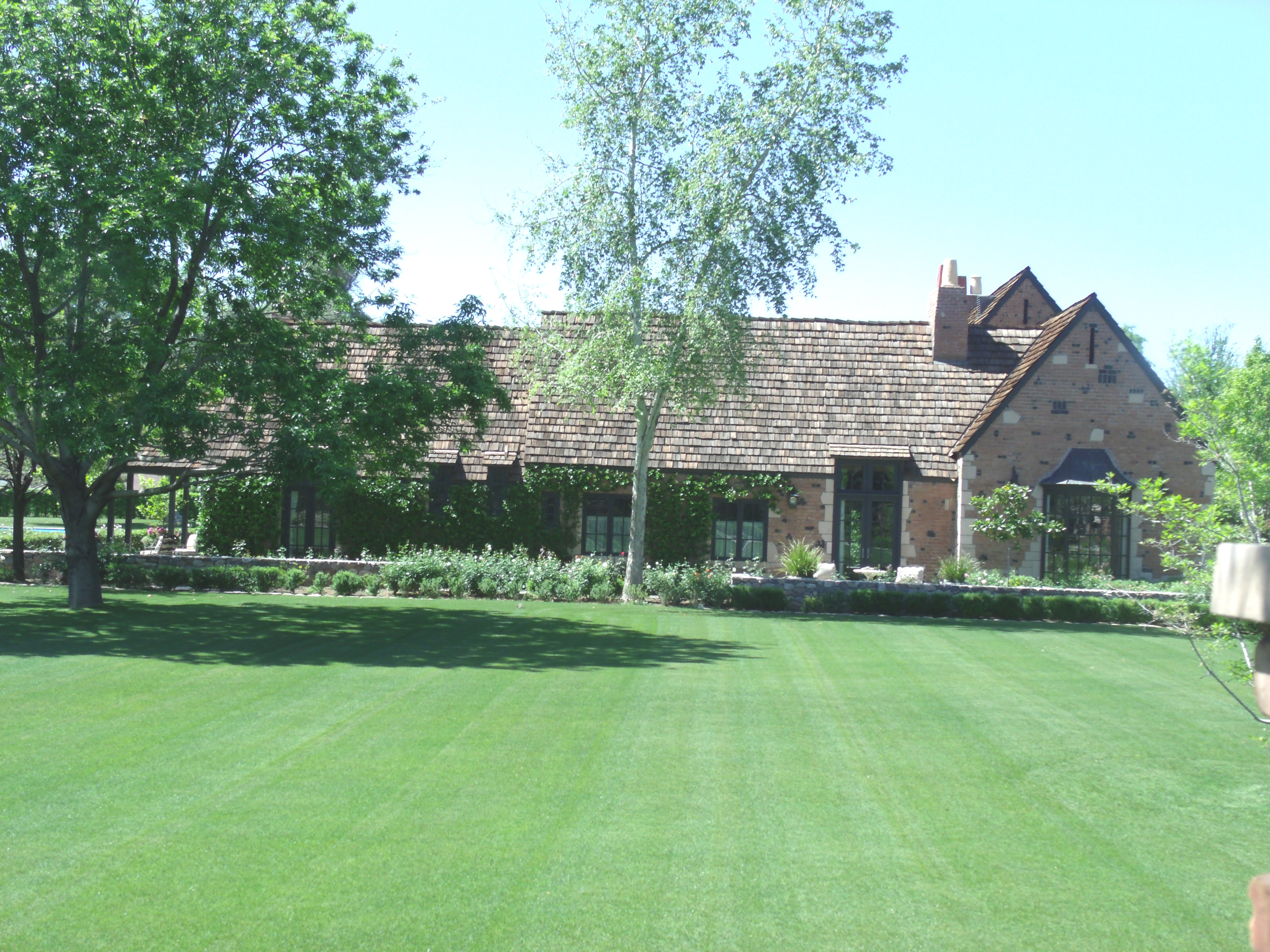
The John M. Ross House was built in 1926 and is located at 6722 N. Central Ave. John Mason Ross was a partner with the successful and well-known law firm of Ellinwood and Ross. The firm represented large clients such as the Phelps-Dodge (mining) Corporation. In addition, Ross also participated in many Arizona civic and political affairs. It was listed in the National Register of Historic Places on February 24, 2000, reference #00000145.

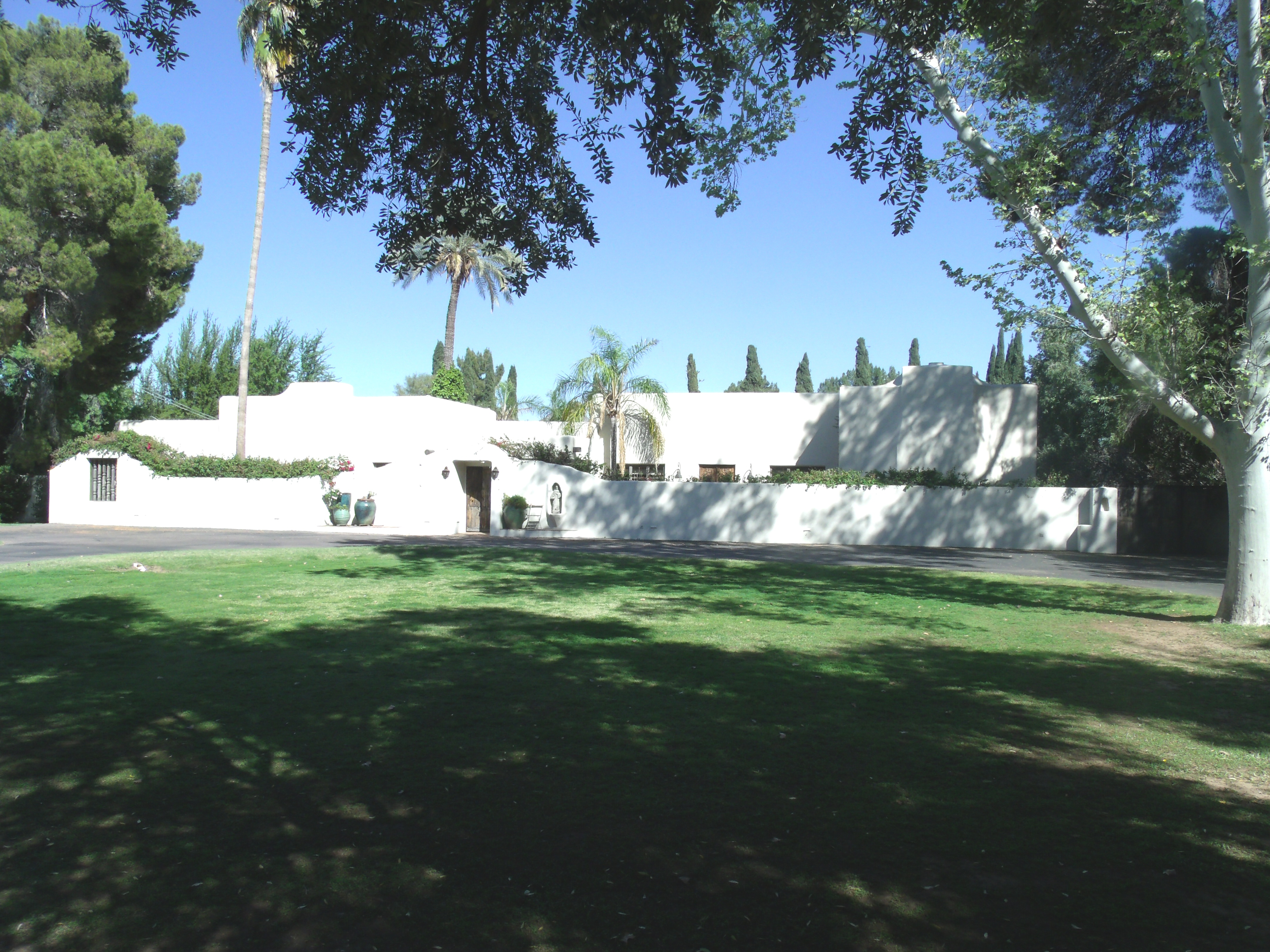
The Ralph Converse House was built in 1935 and is located at 6617 N. Central Ave. It was listed in the Phoenix Historic Properties Register in March 2003. It was listed in the National Register of Historic Places on April 8, 2010, reference #10000153.

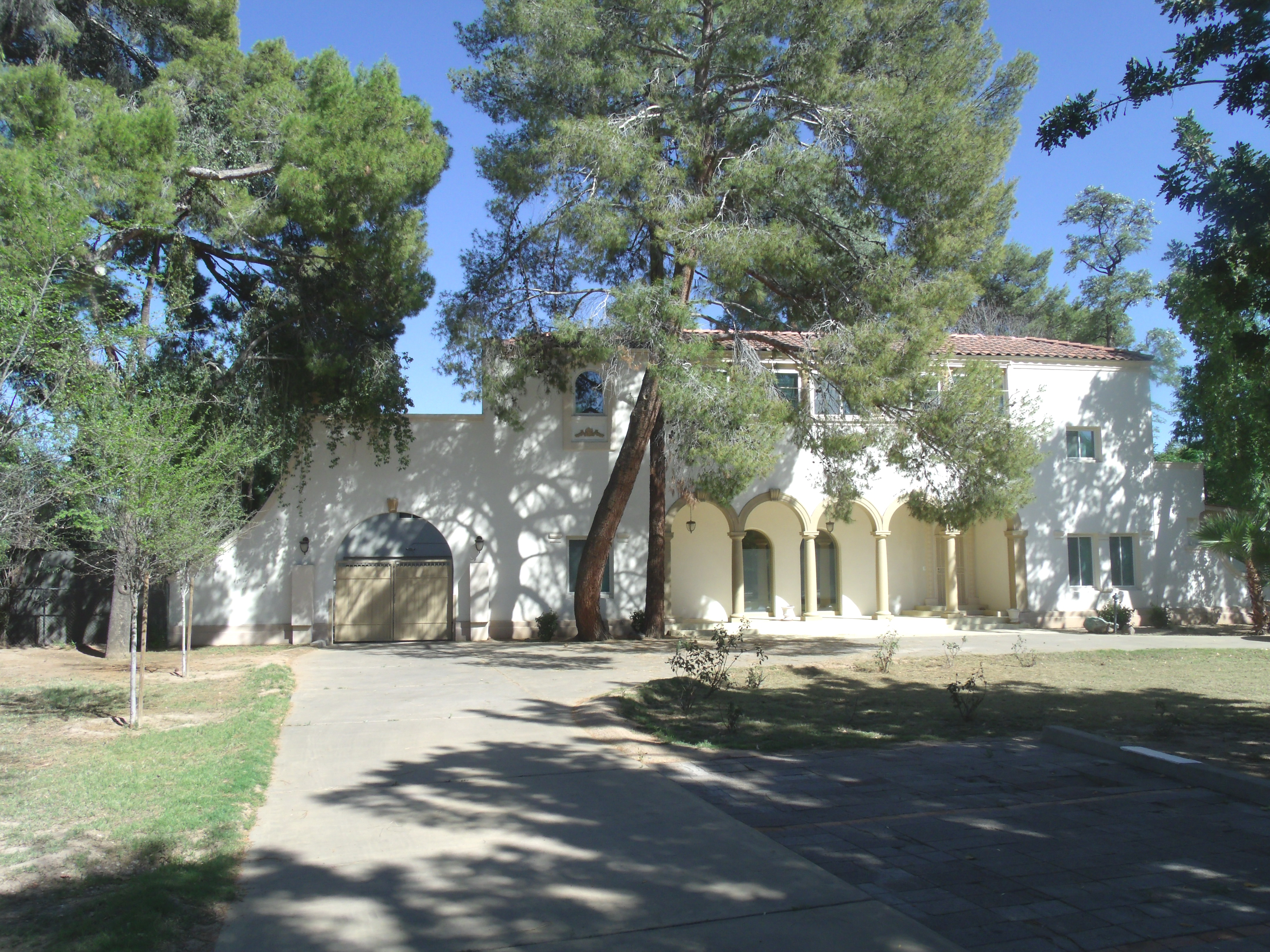
The Mrs. Leonard George House was built in 1929 and is located at 6611 N. Central Ave. It was listed in the Phoenix Historic Properties Register in March 2003.

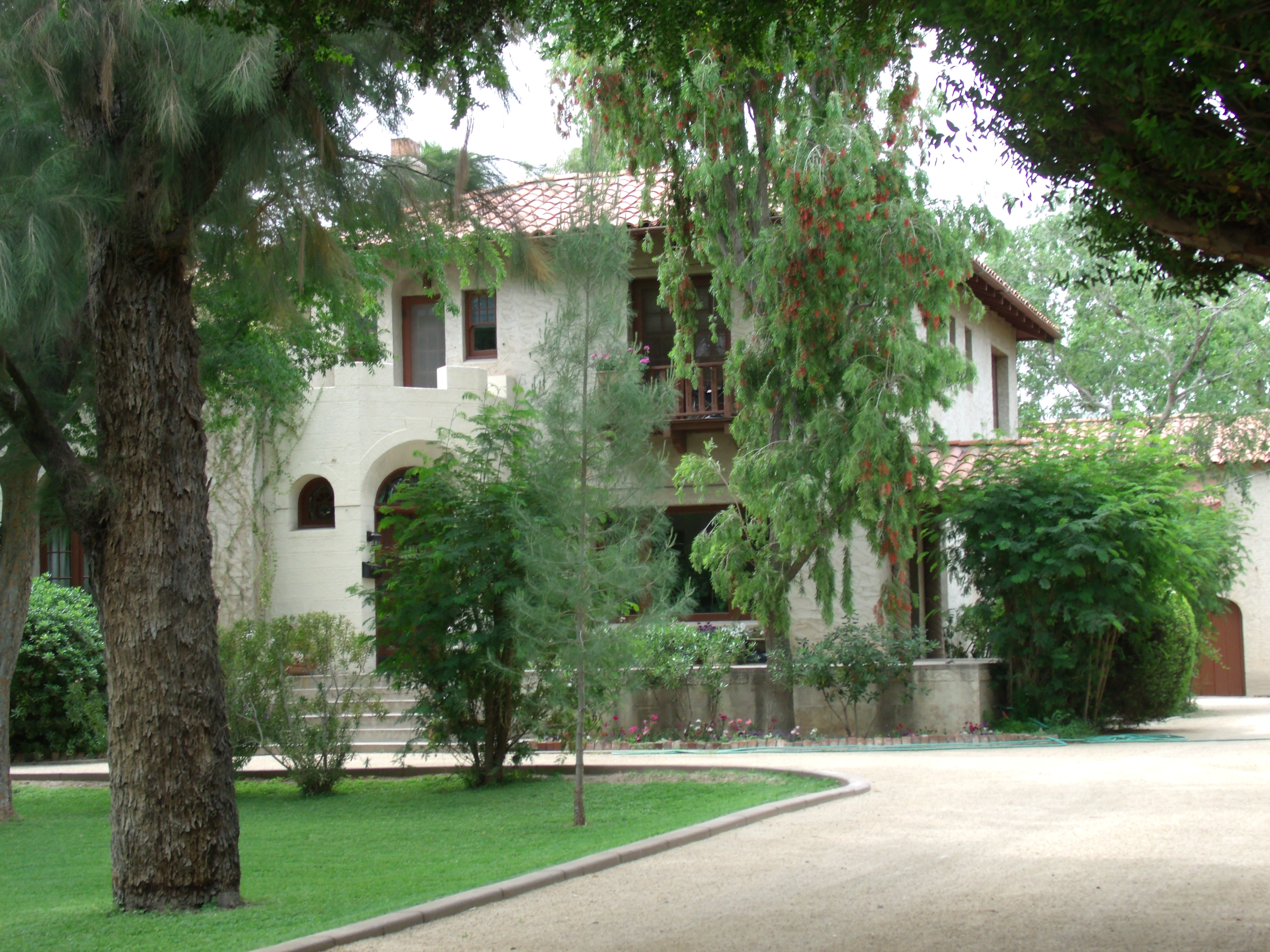
The Abner Elliot England-Guy Hidden Lawrence House was built in 1929 and is located at 6234 N. Central Ave. (NRHP).

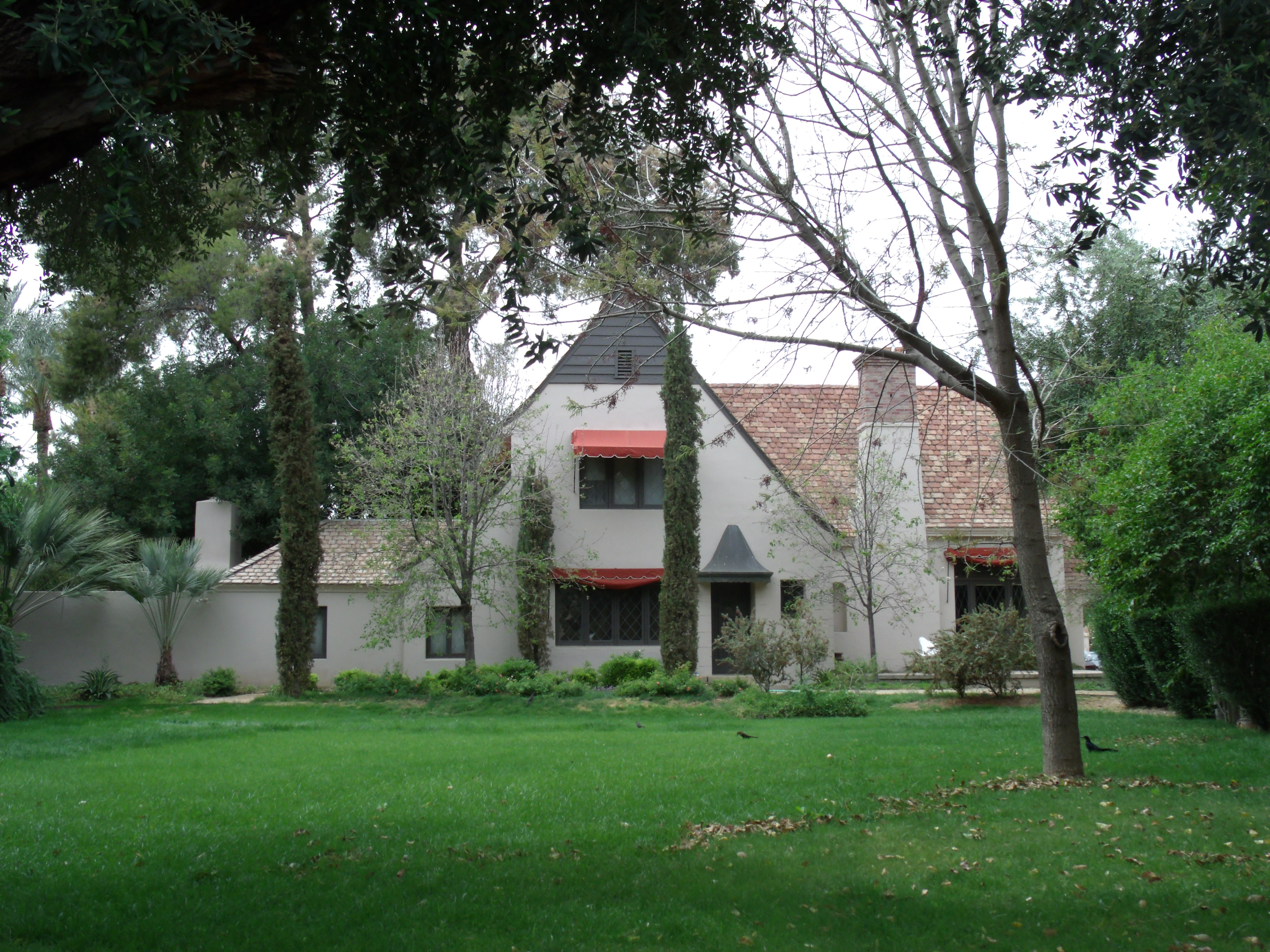
The Judge Fred C. Jacobs House was built in 1928 and is located at 6224 N. Central Ave. (NRHP).

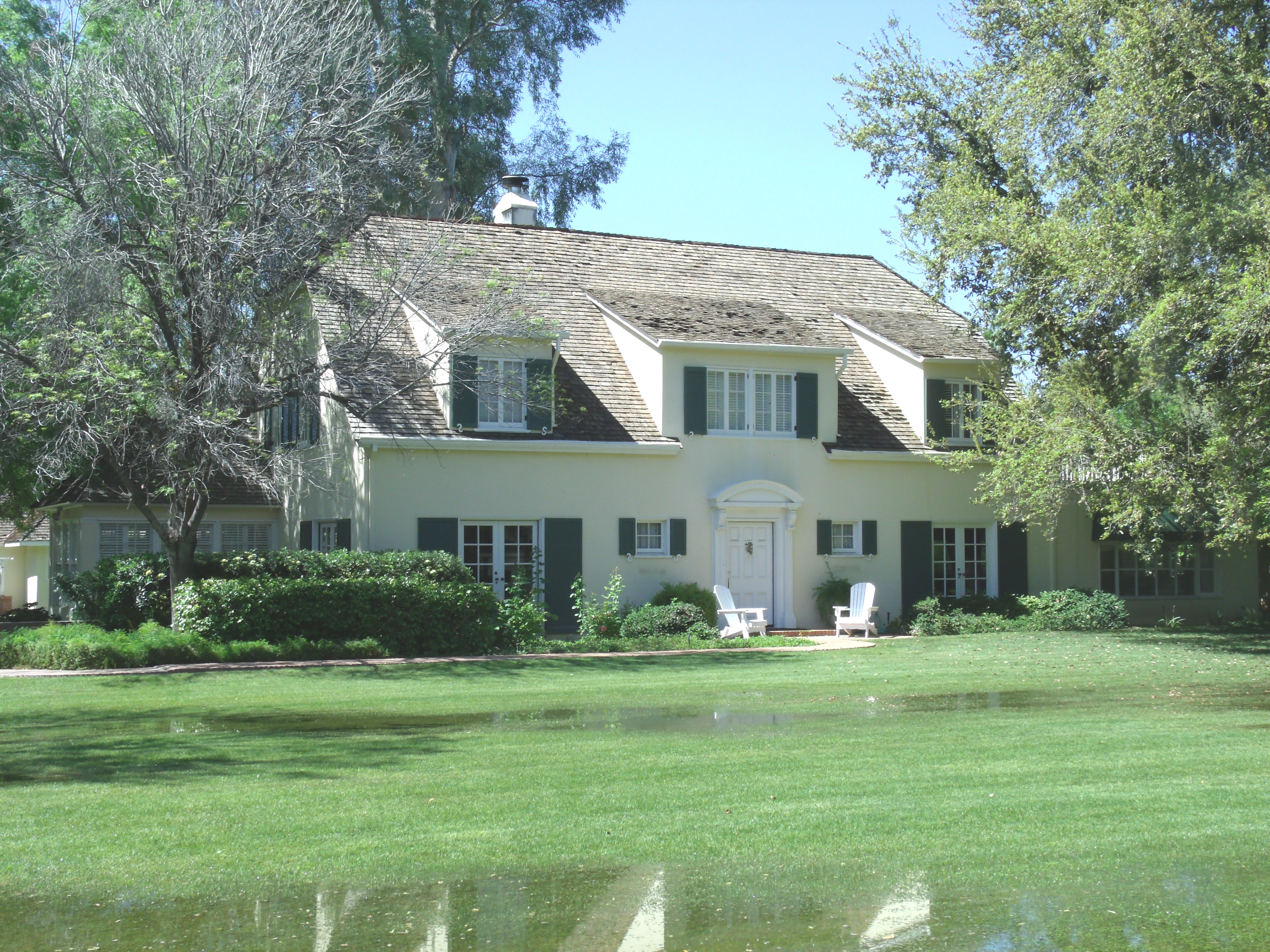
The E. Payne Palmer House was built in 1929 and is located at 6012 N. Central Ave. Dr. Errol Payne Palmer was a significant member of the medical community at local, national and international levels. He made tremendous contributions to advance hospital standardization and administration in the United States. Additionally, his contributions in surgical techniques, cancer research and patient care coincide with the advancements in medicine in the early 20th century. Dr. Palmer was also a prominent member and contributor to his community giving selflessly of his time and money to religious, arts and social organizations in order to improve the quality of life for others in Phoenix. It was listed in the Phoenix Historic Properties Register in June 1999. It was listed in the National Register of Historic Places on May 2, 2002, reference #02000420.

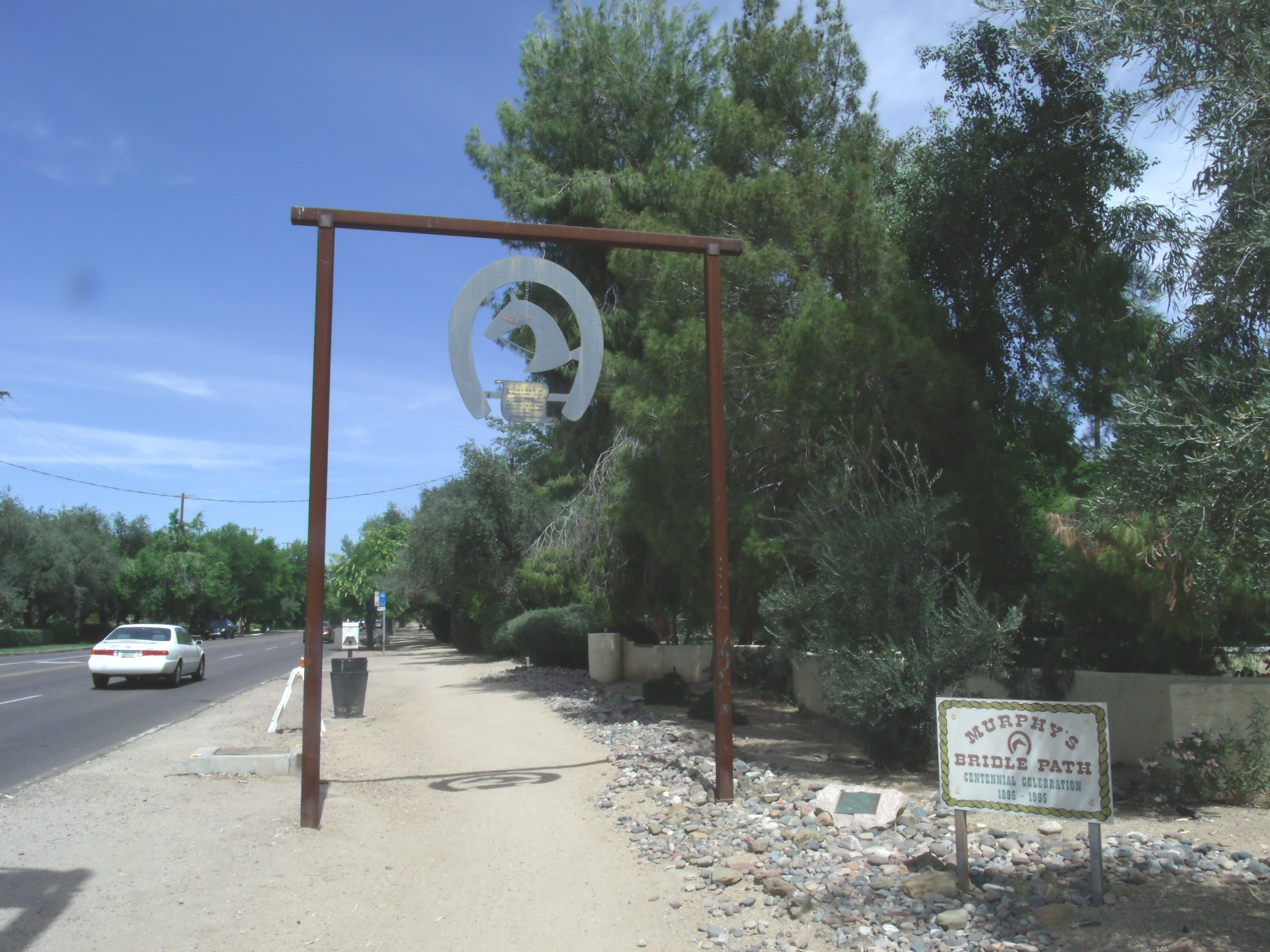
The Murphy Bridle Path begins at Bethany Homes Road and ends two and half miles north at the Arizona Canal. This particular landscape or streetscape history is significant in telling the story of how Phoenix developed in the late 1880s and the early years of the 20th century. William John Murphy, who moved from Illinois to Phoenix in 1883, built the Arizona Canal and established the Valley citrus industry in the northern extension of Central Avenue in 1895. The roadway cut through the Orangewood subdivision he developed and was first paved in 1920. The earliest reference to the Murphy Bridle Path that the city's historic preservation office discovered was in 1948 when the bridle path was dedicated by the "Arizona Horse Lover's Club." The North Central Avenue streetscape is now on the Phoenix Historic Property Register and has been nominated to the National Register of Historic Places.

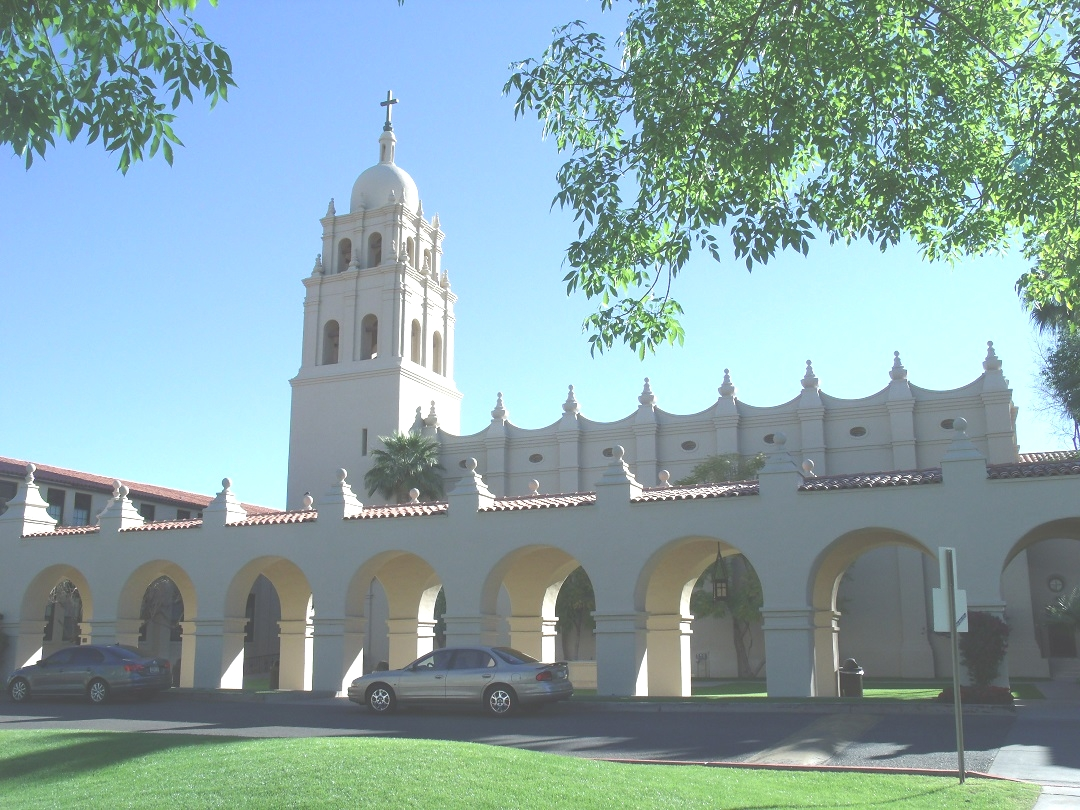
The Brophy College Chapel was built in 1928 and is located at 4701 N. Central Ave.. The Chapel was donated by Mrs. William Henry Brophy in memory of her husband. The Spanish Colonial chapel was built by the students of Brophy College. It was listed in the National Register of Historic Places on August 10, 1993, reference #93000747.

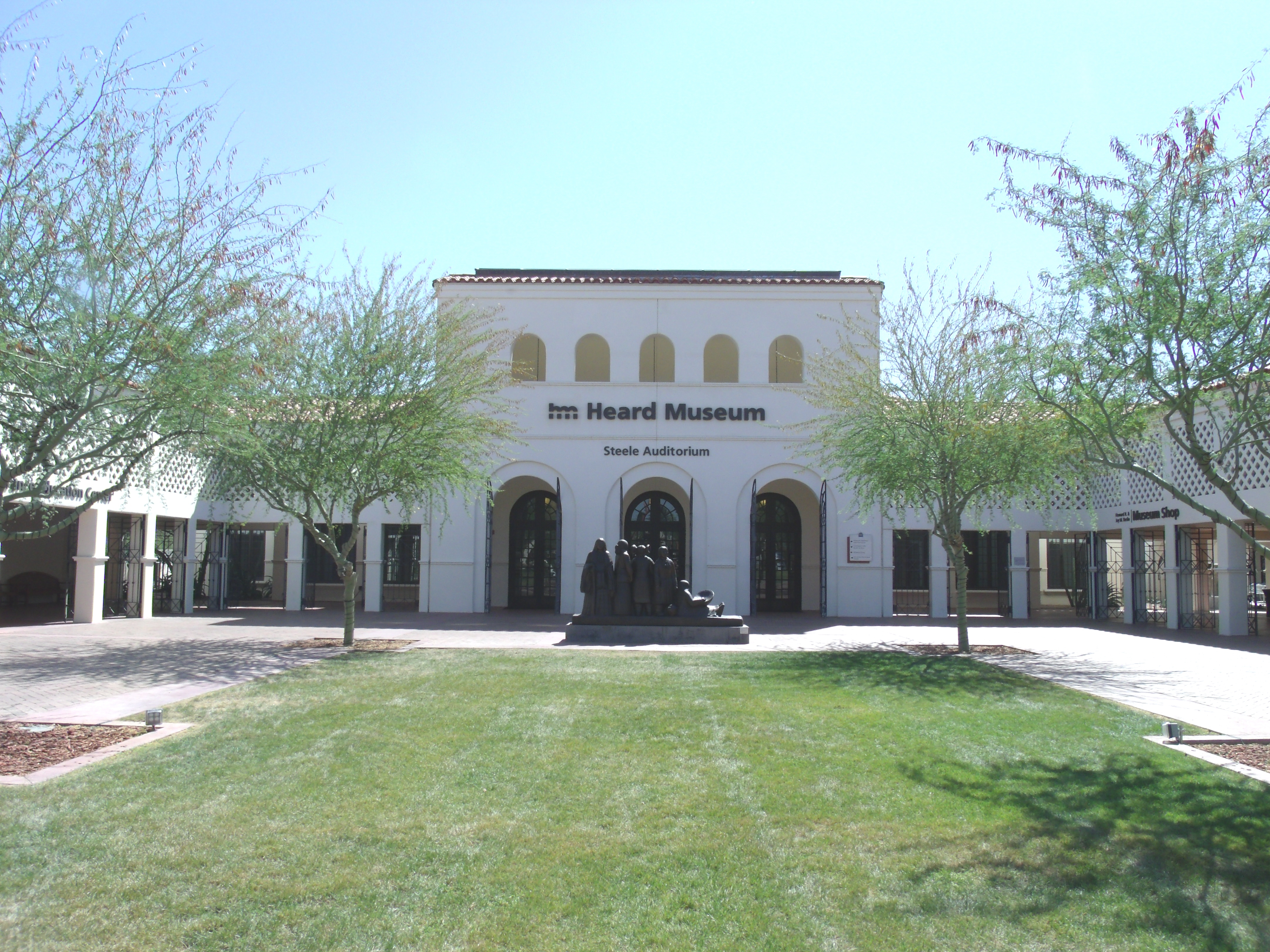
The front entrance of the Heard Museum building which was built in 1929 and is located at 2301 N. Central Ave. / 22 E. Monte Vista Road. It was listed in the Phoenix Historic Property Register in August 1992.

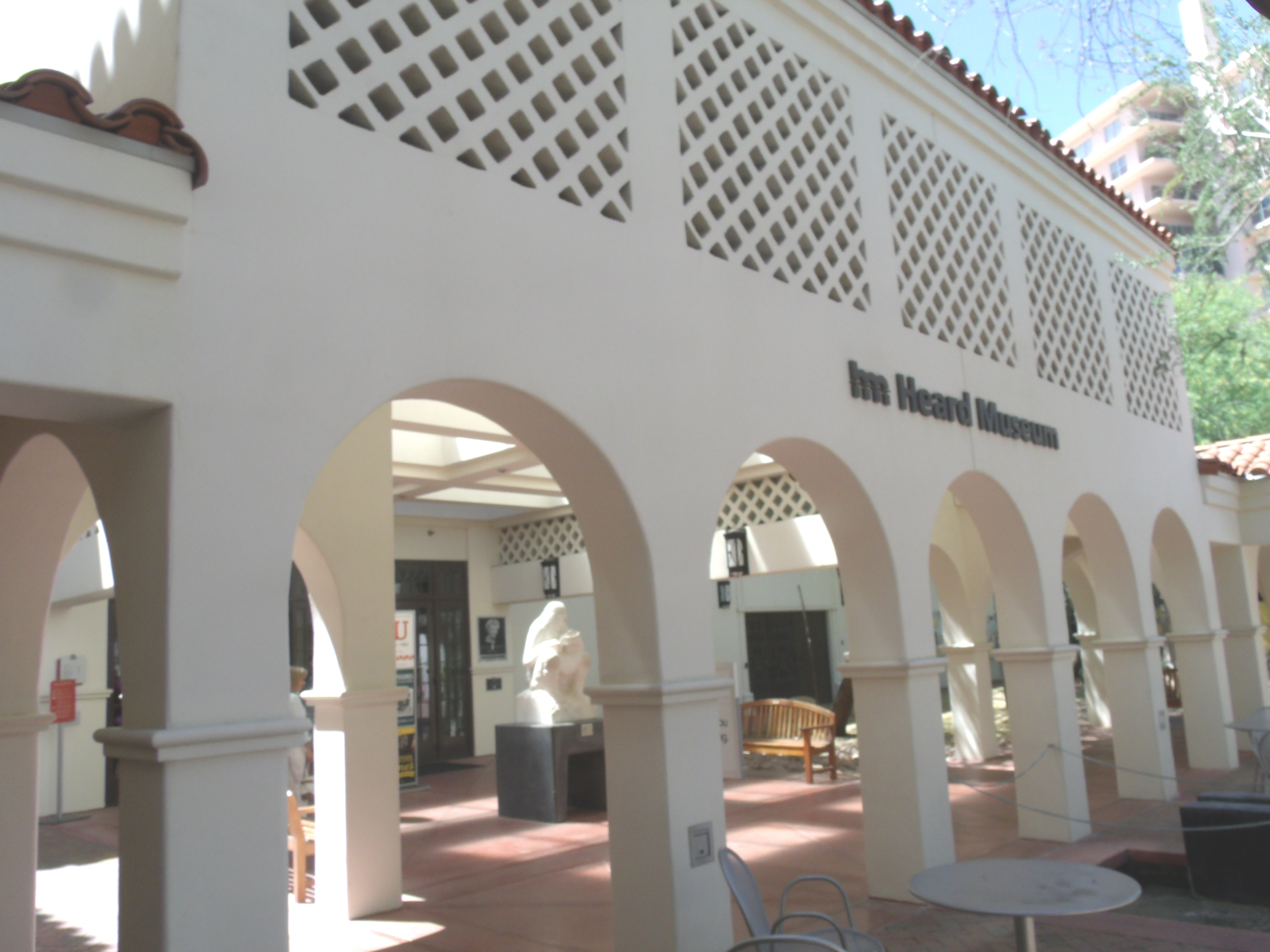
The Heard Museum building was built in 1929 and is located at 2301 N. Central Ave. / 22 E. Monte Vista Road. Maie Heard added quality artworks to the collection and worked closely with the board of trustees to direct the activities of the museum. She also oversaw the programming activities of the museum, approving speakers and insuring appropriate publicity was available. It was listed in the Phoenix Historic Property Register in August 1992.

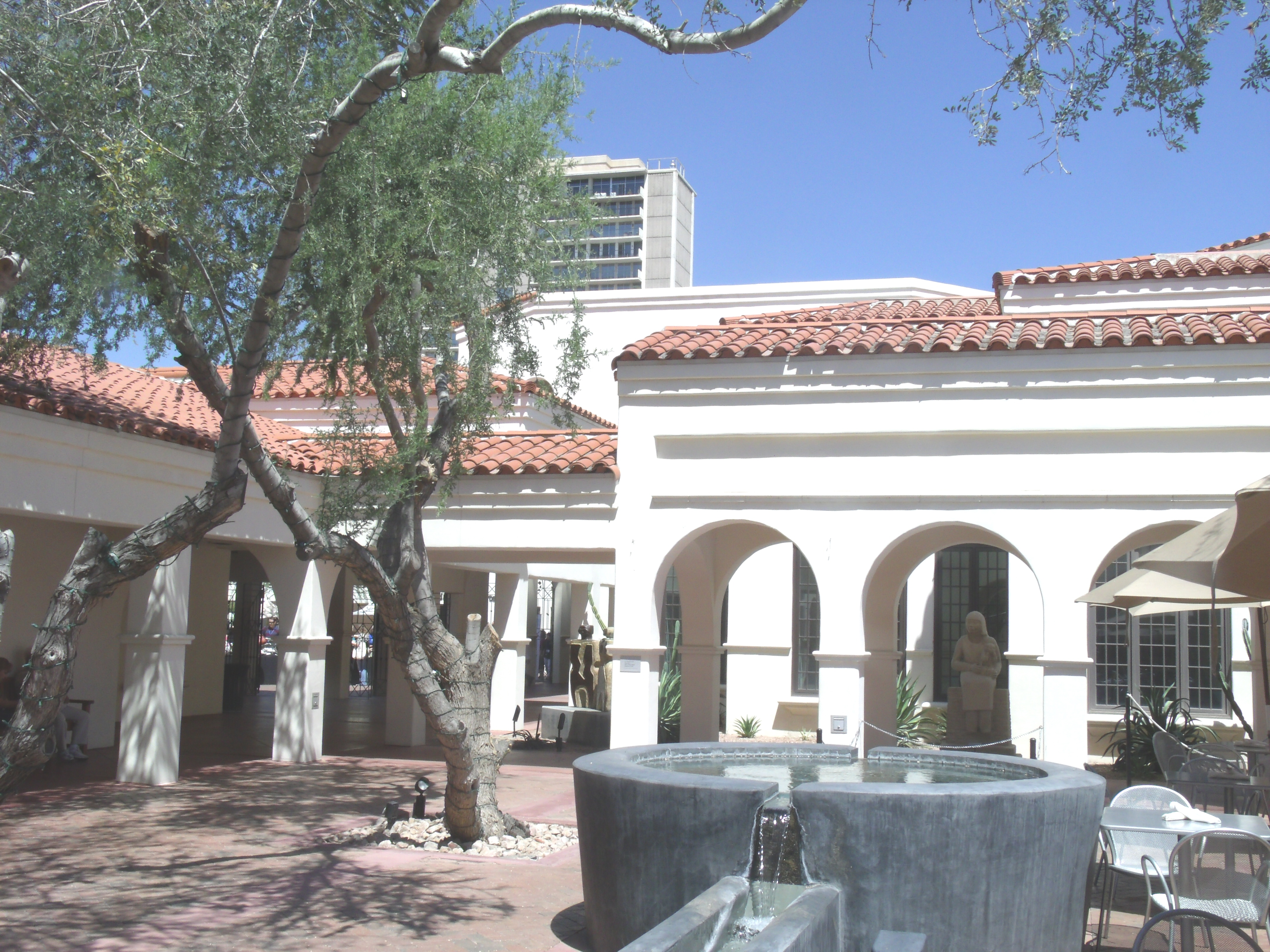
Different view of the Heard Museum.

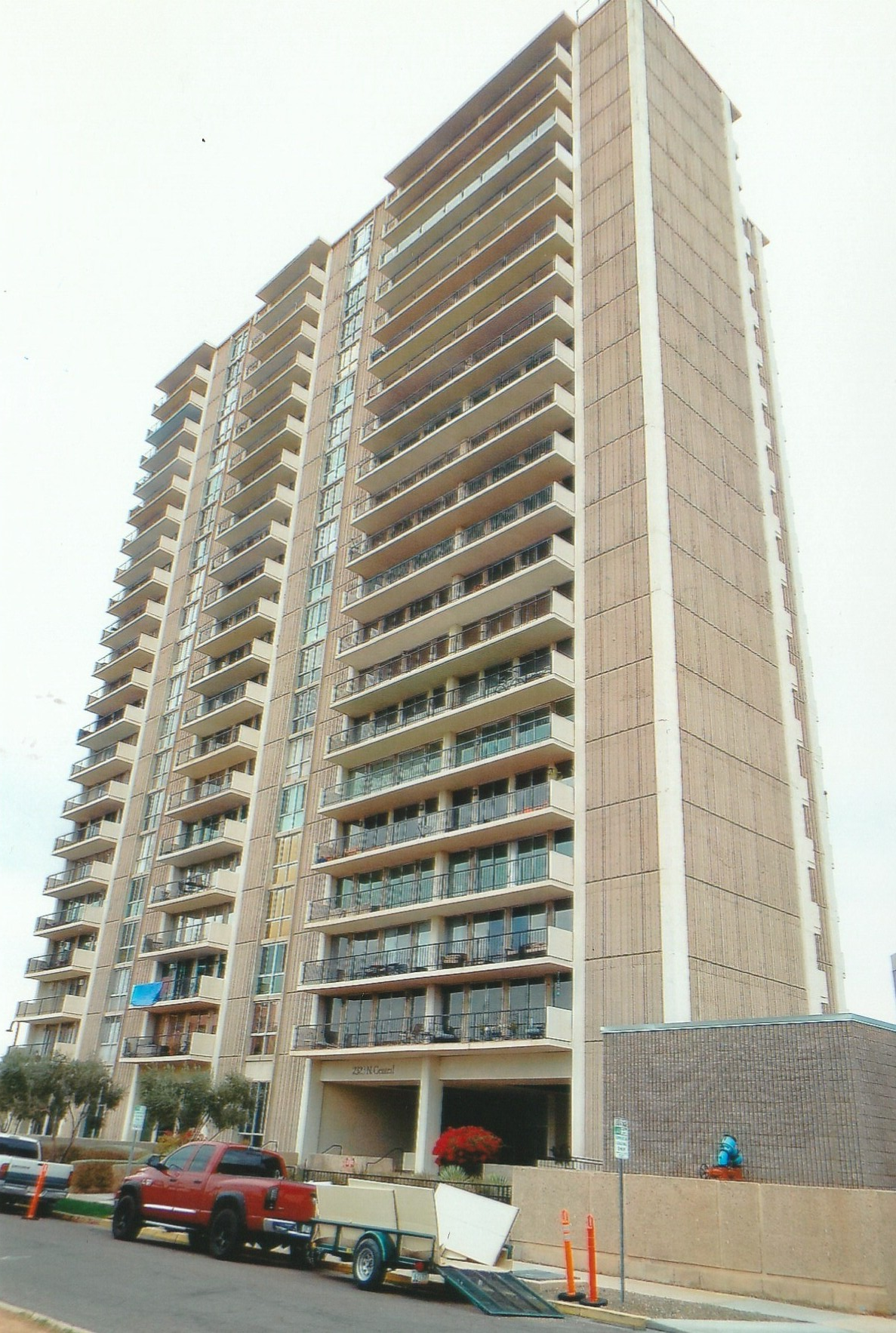
Regency On Central, formally The Regency House was built in 1964 and is located at 2323 North Central Ave. It was listed in the National Register of Historic Places on September 26, 2016, reference # 16000630.

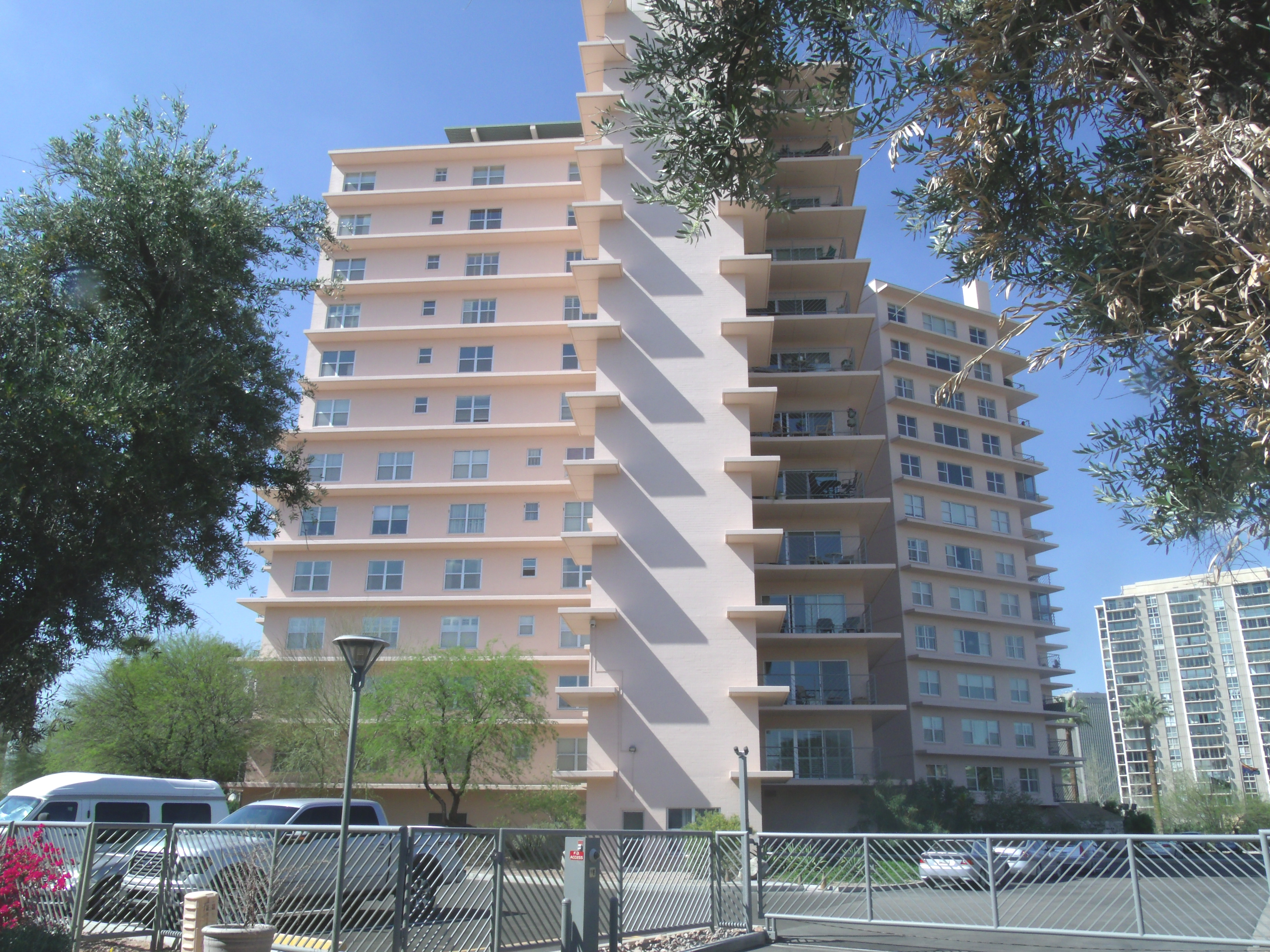
Phoenix Towers was built in 1957 and is located at 2201 N. Central Ave. Phoenix Towers was built as a resident-owned cooperative community, Phoenix Towers is now considered an outstanding example of mid-century architecture and was listed in the National Register of Historic Places on January 2, 2008, reference #07001334.

Front view of the Phoenix Towers. The towers were built in 1957 and are located at 2201 N. Central Ave. Phoenix Towers was built as a resident-owned cooperative community, Phoenix Towers is now considered an outstanding example of mid-century architecture and was listed in the National Register of Historic Places on January 2, 2008, reference #07001334.

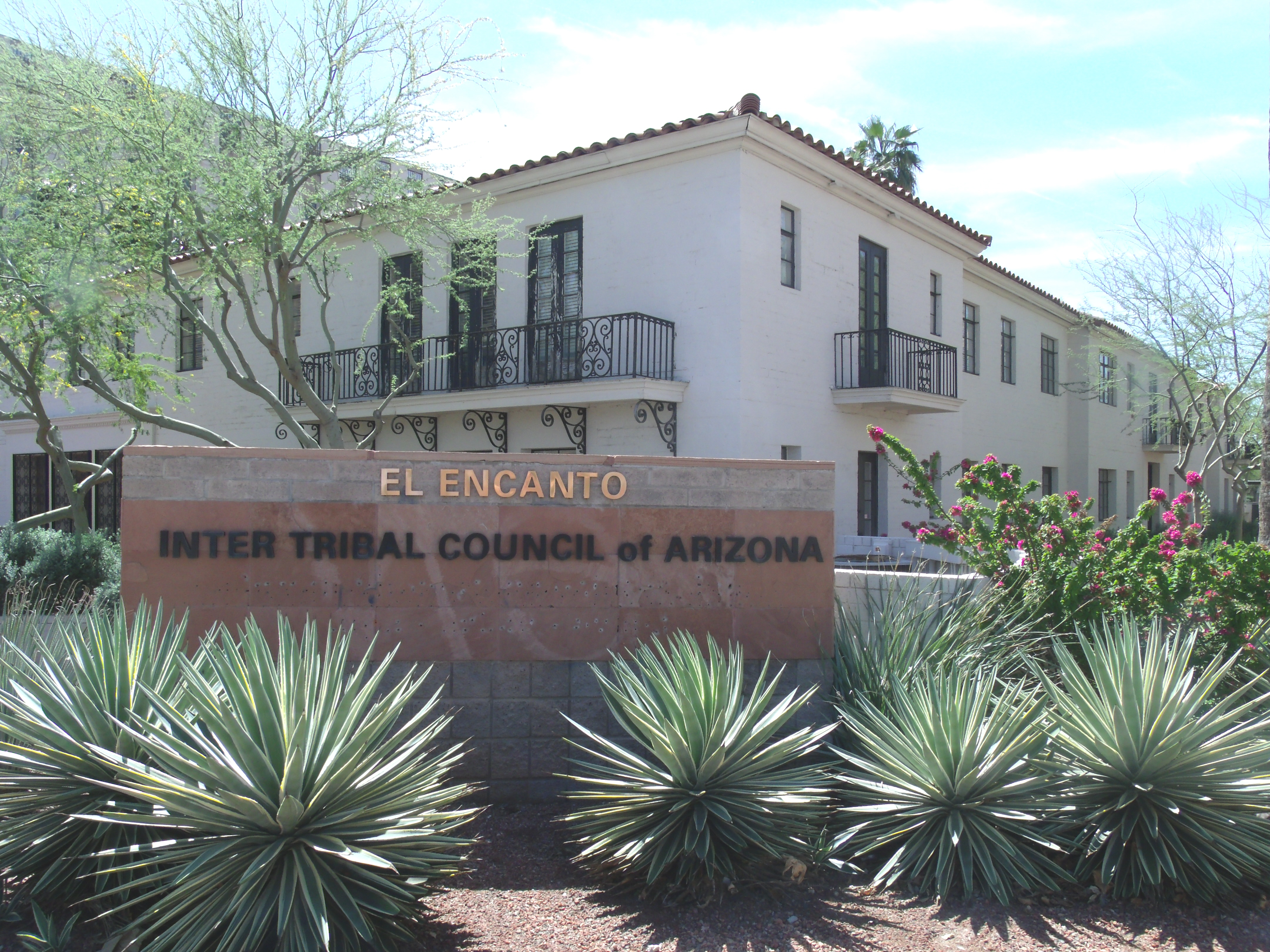
The El Encanto Apartment Building was built in 1939 and is located at 2214 N. Central Ave. The El Encanto Apartment Building was the largest apartment complex in Phoenix at the time. The Inter Tribal Council of Arizona Inc. is oversaw the renovation of the complex. It was listed in the Phoenix Historic Properties Register in December 1990.

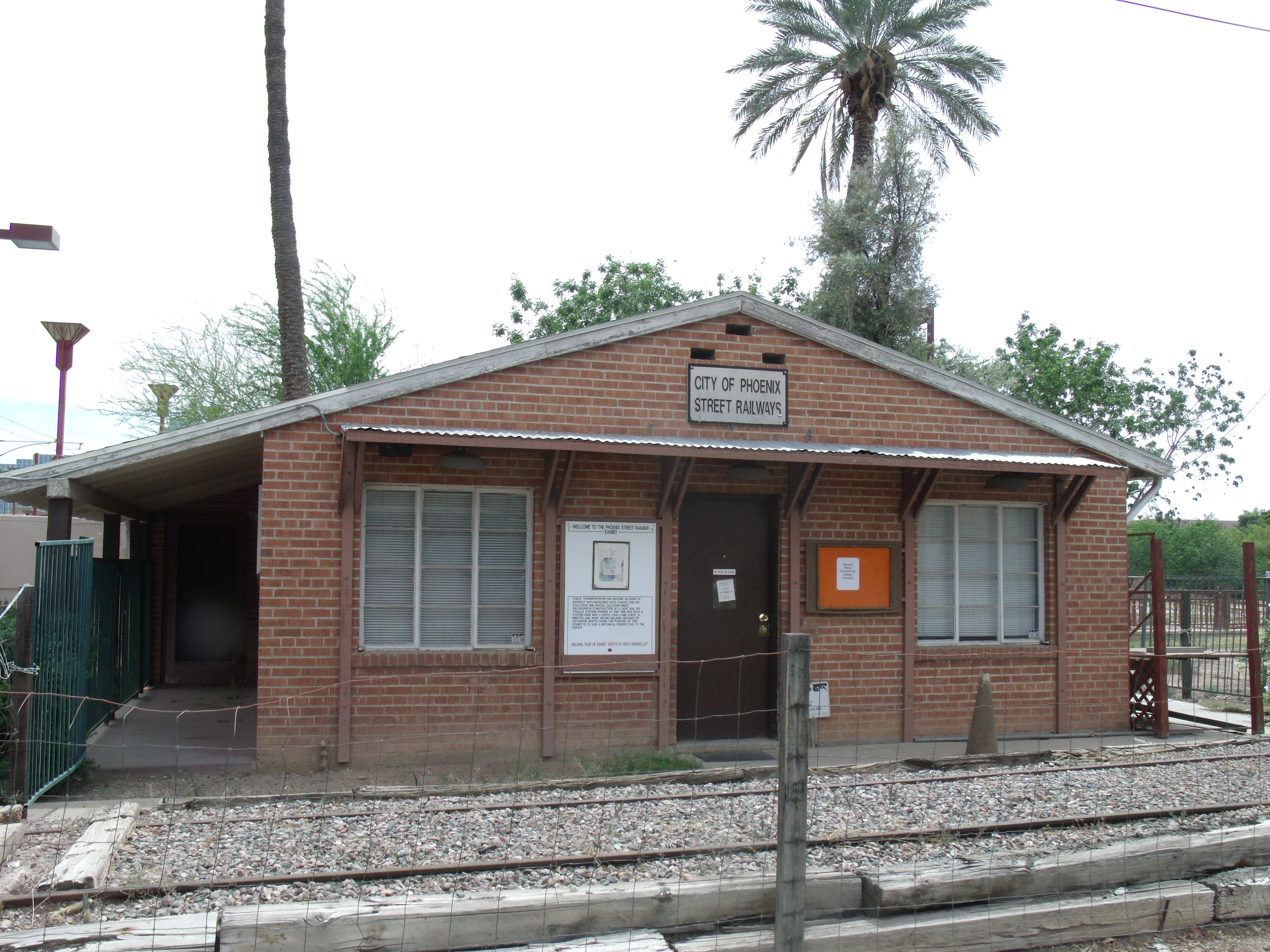
The Dr. Shackelford Dental Office Building which currently houses a small exhibit of the Arizona Street Railway Museum and is located at 1242 N. Central Ave.(PHPR).

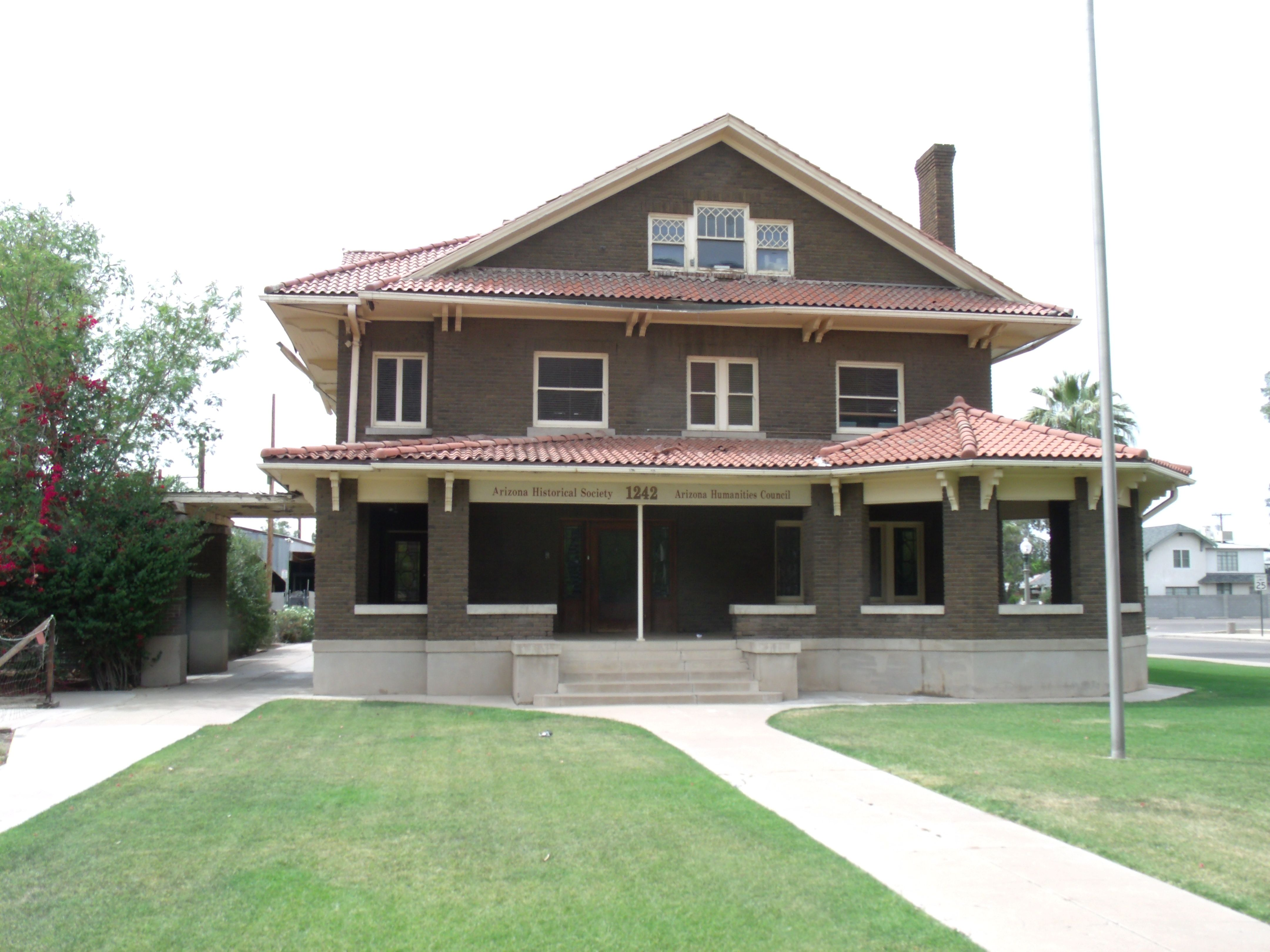
The Dr. Ellis House was built in 1917 and is located at 1242 N. Central Ave. (NRHP).

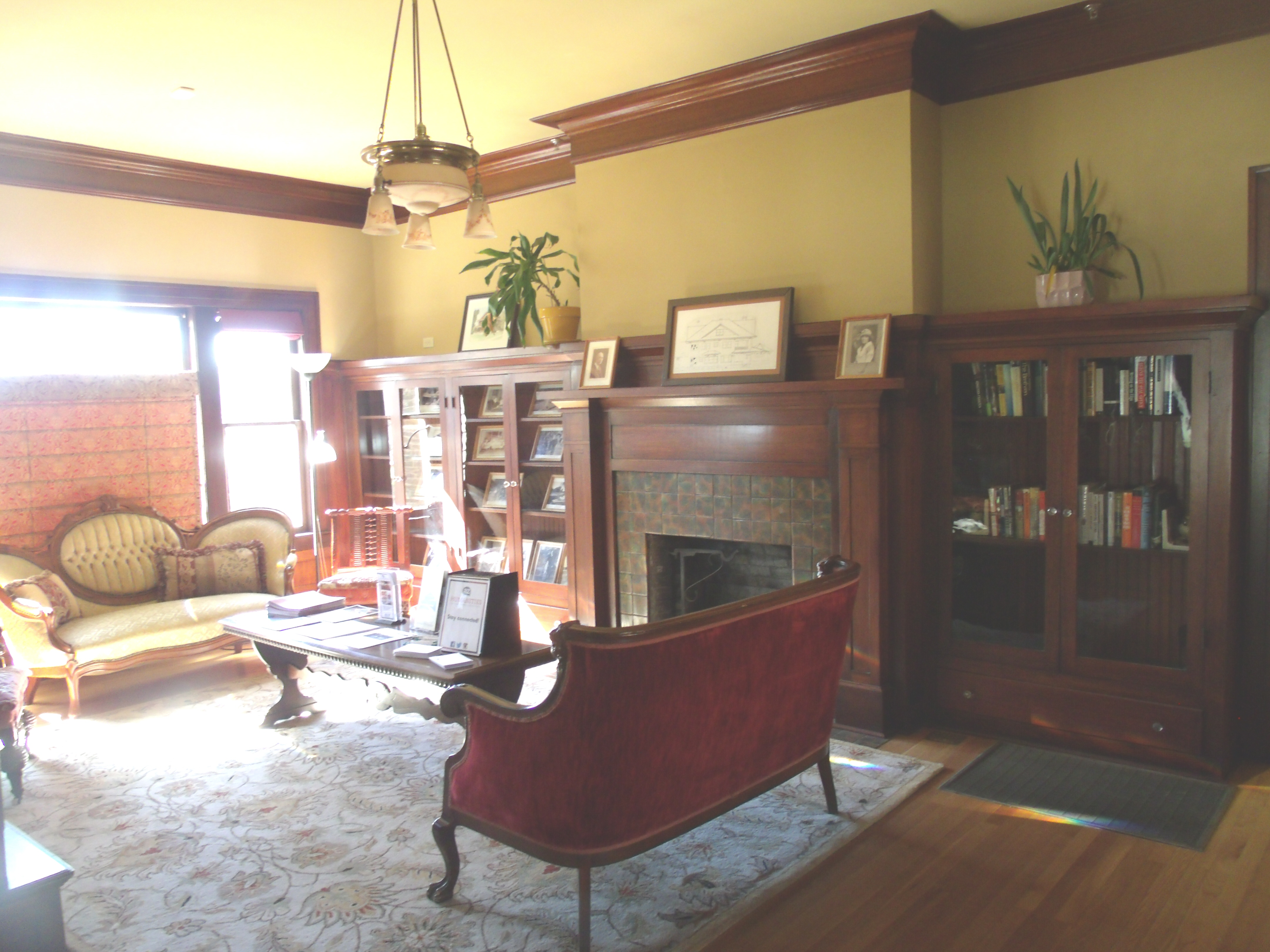
The living room of the Ellis-Shackelford House. The house was built in 1917 and is located in 1242 N. Central Ave. On November 30, 1983, the house was listed in the National Register of Historic Places, ref.: #83003475.

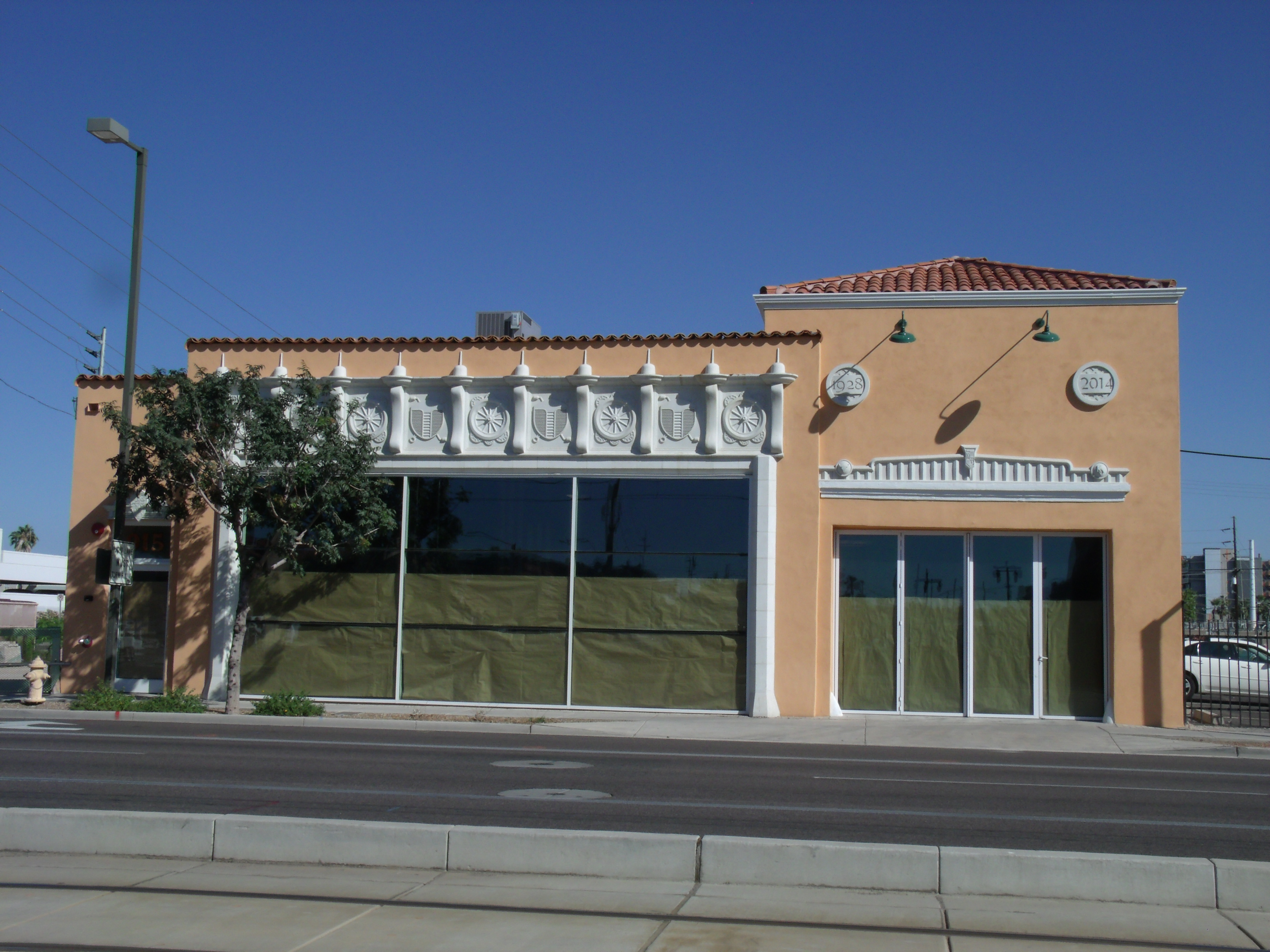
The C. P. Stephans De Soto Six Motor Cars building was built in 1927 and is located at 915 N. Central Ave. On February 20, 2013, the property was listed in the National Register of Historic Places, reference: #13000019.

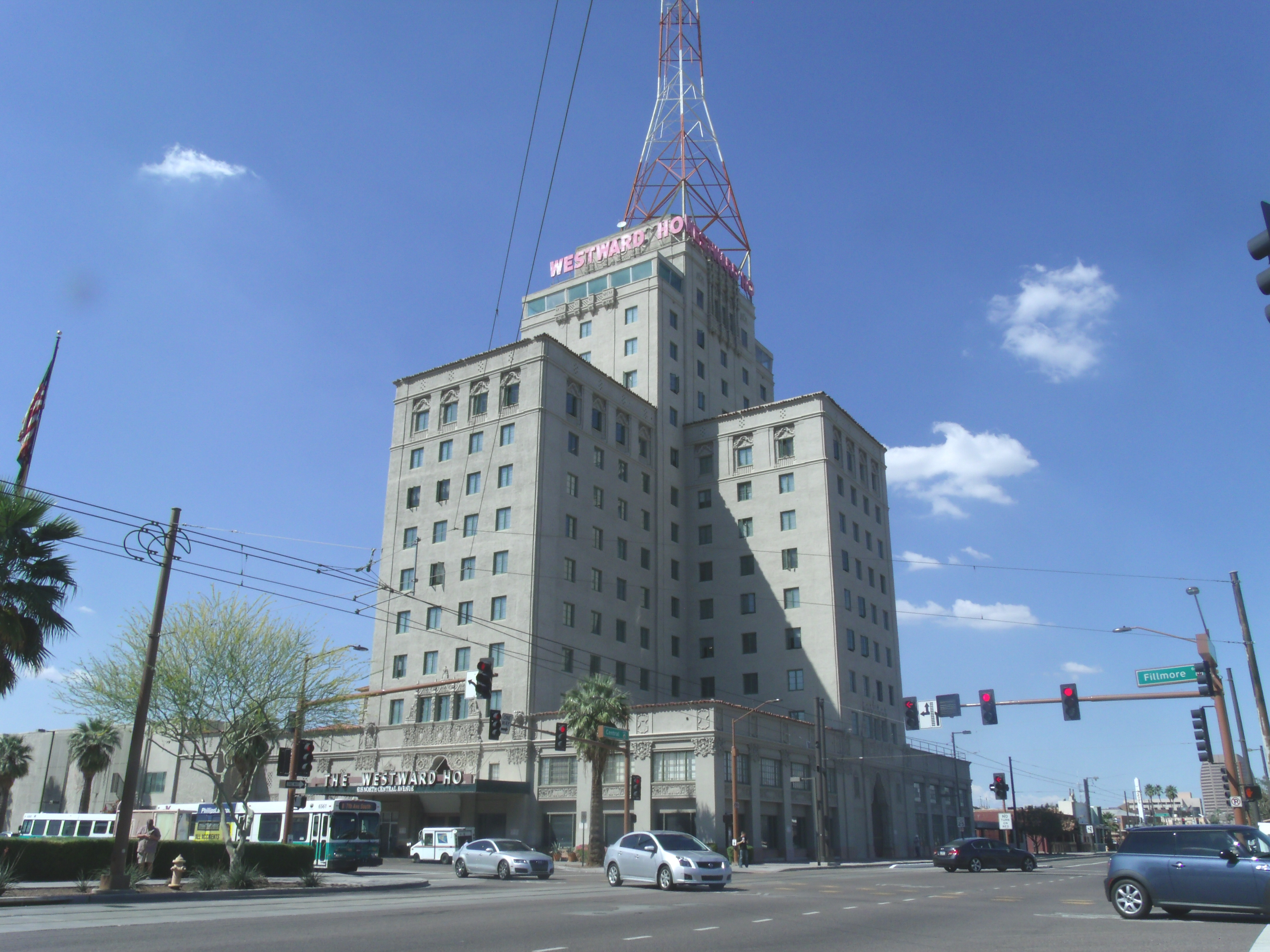
The Westward Ho Hotel was built in 1928 and is located at 618 N. Central Ave. It was listed in the National Register of Historic Places on February 19, 1982, reference: #82002082.

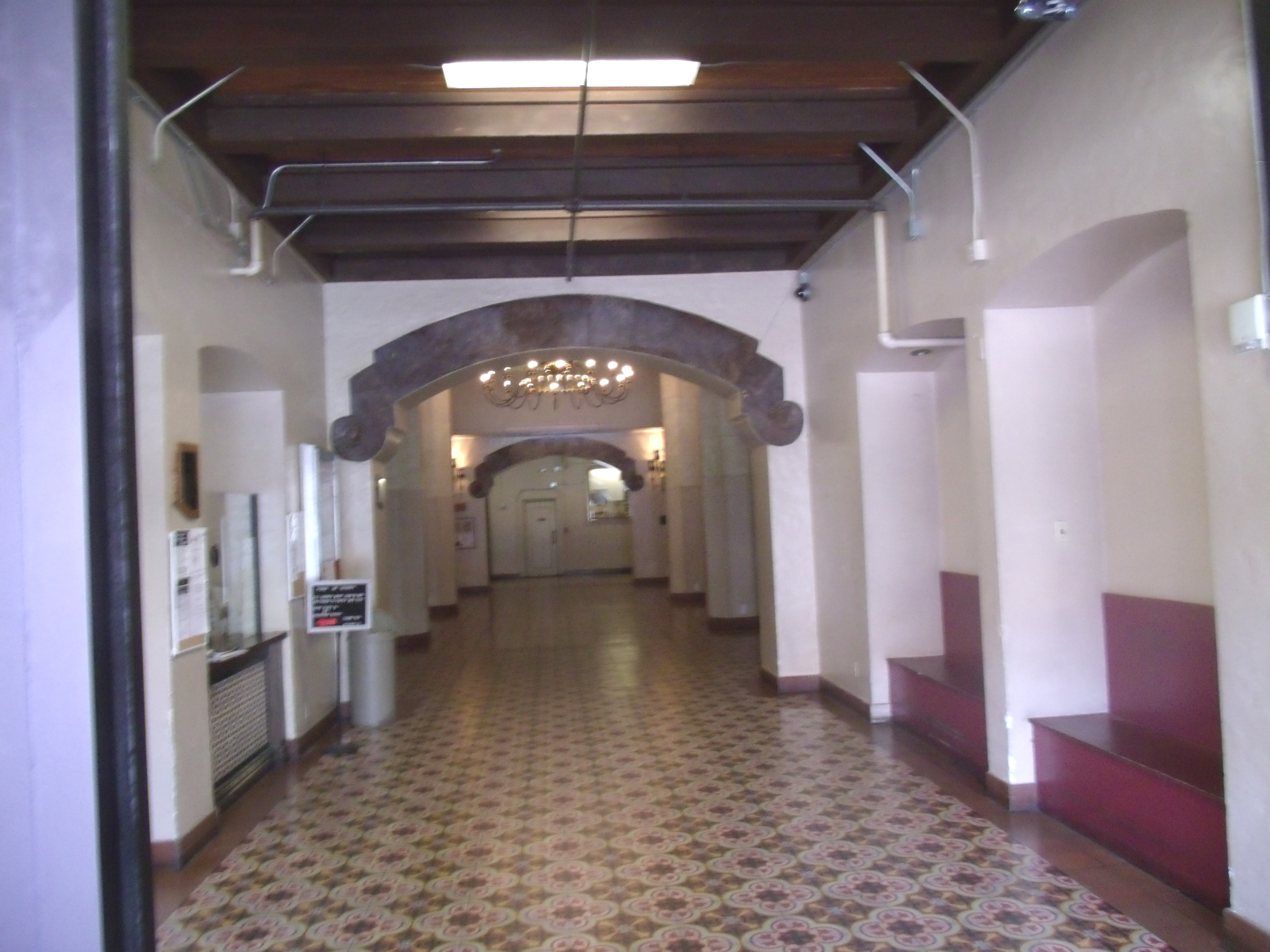
The lobby of the Westward Ho Hotel. The hotel was built in 1928 and is located at 618 N. Central Ave. Among the notable people who have passed through this lobby are John F. Kennedy, Marilyn Monroe, Paul Newman, Elizabeth Taylor, Nicky Hilton, Roy Rogers, Jackie Gleason, Mryna Loy, Amelia Earhart, Esther Williams, Danny Thomas, Gary Cooper, Lucille Ball, Clark Gable, Henry Fonda, Bob Hope, Liberace, Lee Marvin, Tyrone Power, Eleanor Roosevelt, Shirley Temple, Al Capone, Spencer Tracy, John Wayne, and Robert Wagner married Natalie Wood on the hotel Patio.

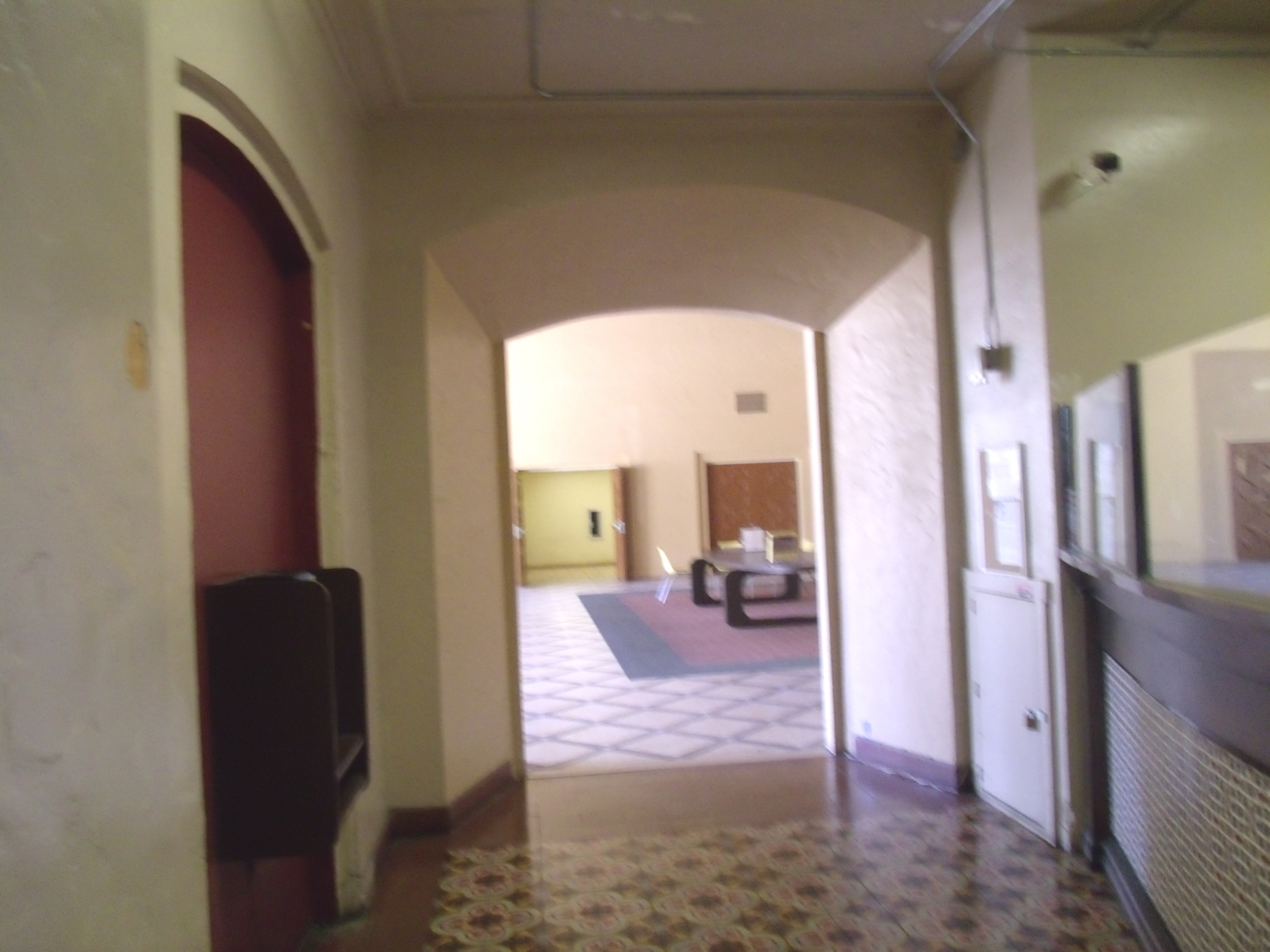
The Grand Dining Room of the Westward Ho Hotel. The hotel was built in 1928 and is located at 618 N. Central Ave. On November 3, 1960, Senator John F. Kennedy made a campaign speech during a Westward Ho Hotel Democratic Breakfast. The hotel was listed in the National Register of Historic Places on February 10, 1983, reference #83002993.

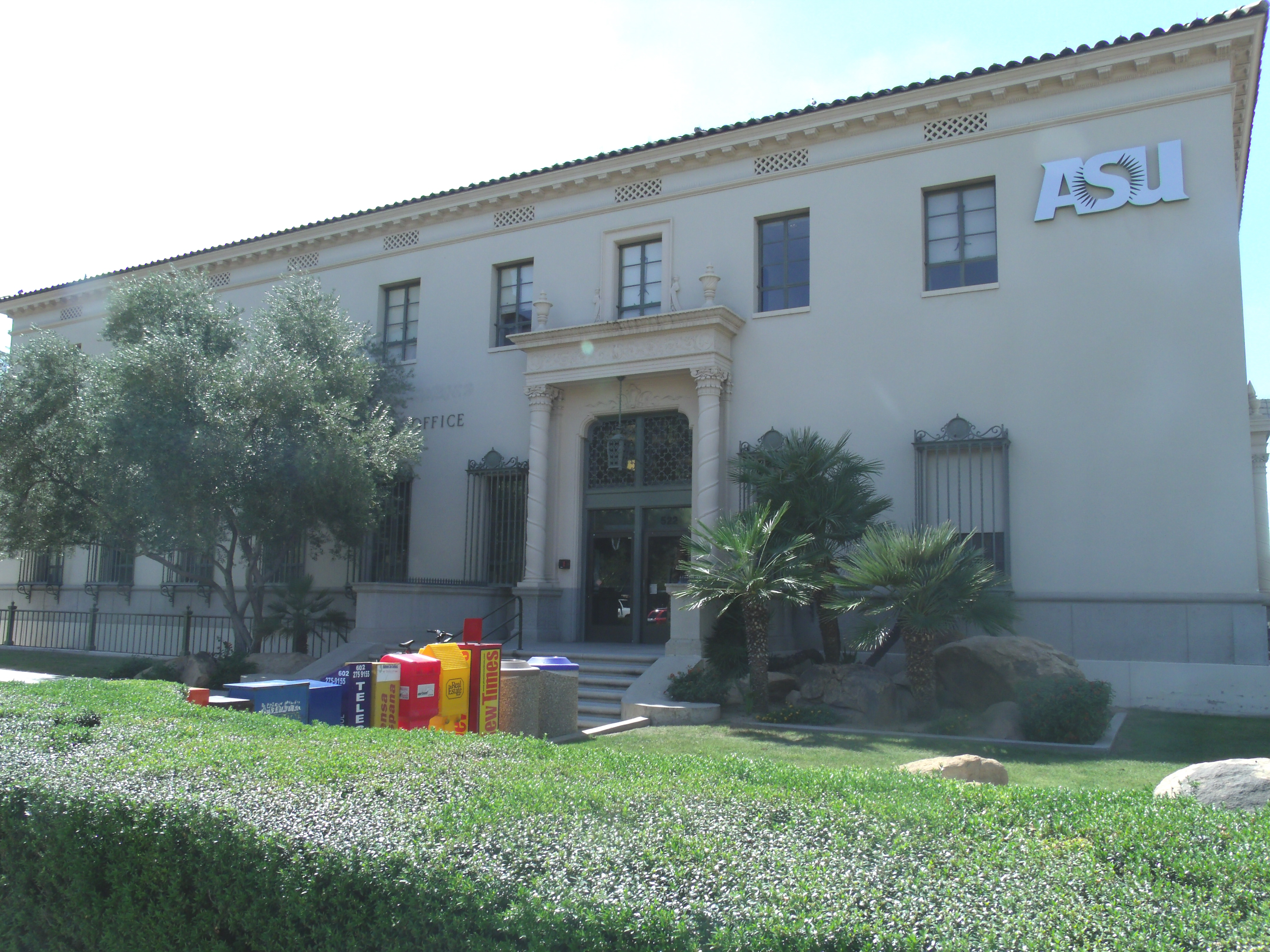
The U.S. Post Office/Federal Building was built 1932-1936 and is located at 522 N. Central Ave. The building was listed in the Historic Properties in Phoenix Register in October 1990. It was listed in the National Register of Historic Places on February 10, 1983, reference #83002993.

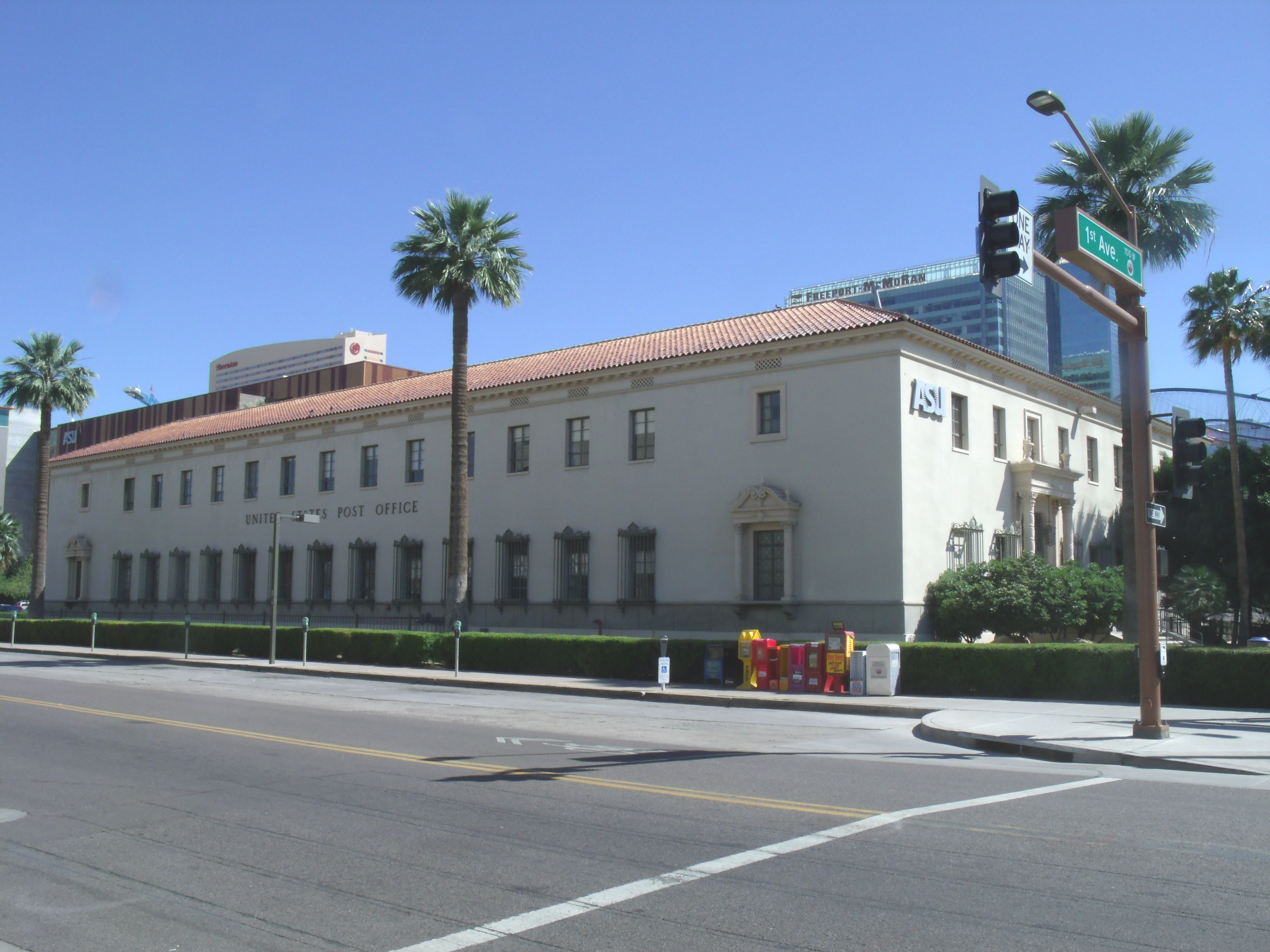
Different view of The U.S. Post Office/Federal Building which was built 1932-1936 which is located at 522 N. Central Ave. The building was listed in the Historic Properties in Phoenix Register in October 1990. It was listed in the National Register of Historic Places on February 10, 1983, reference #83002993.

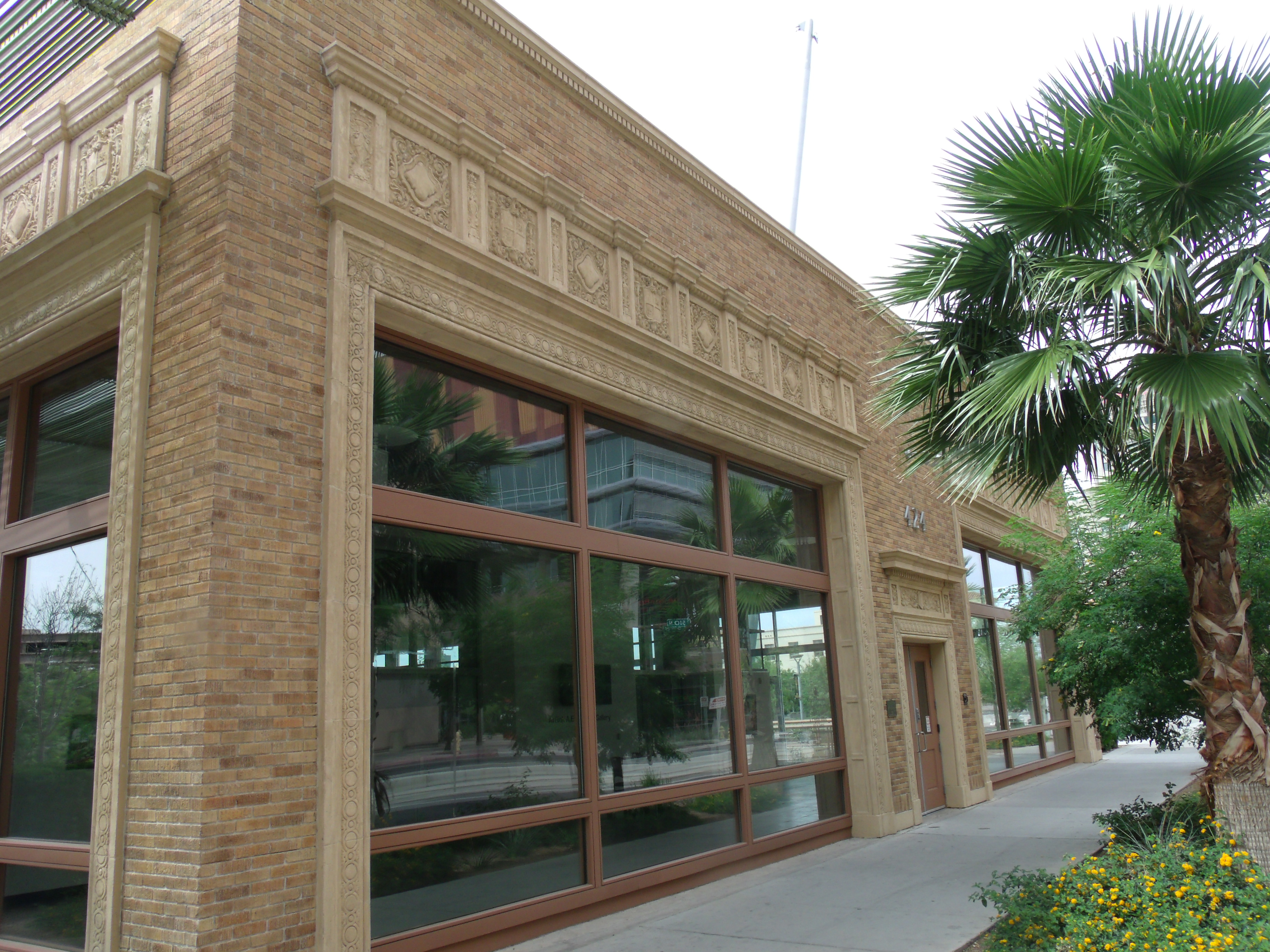
The A.E. England Motors Building was built in 1926 and is located at 424 N. Central Ave. (PHPR)

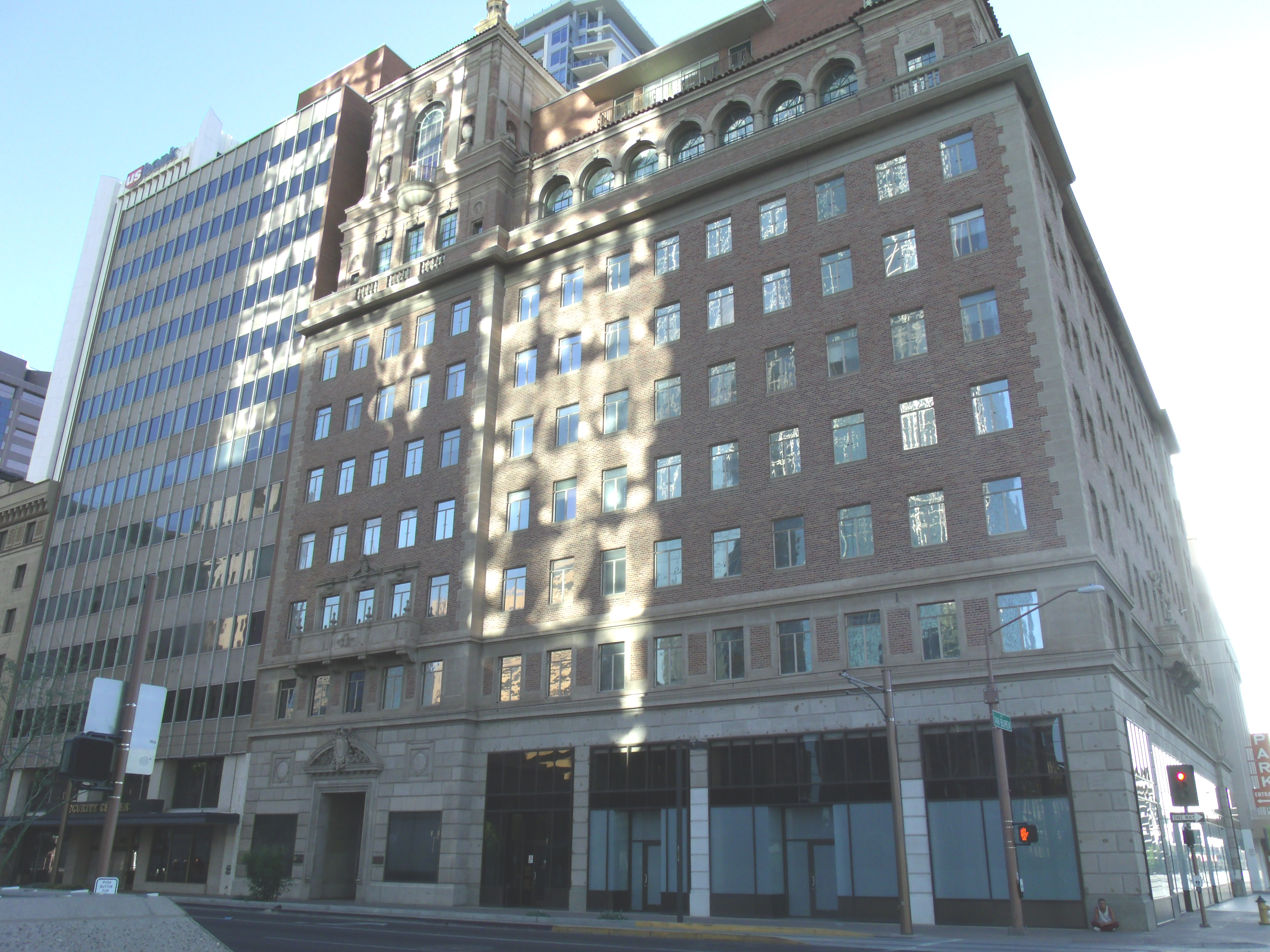
The Security Building was built in 1925 and is located at 234 N. Central Avenue. The property is Listed in the National Register of Historic Places.

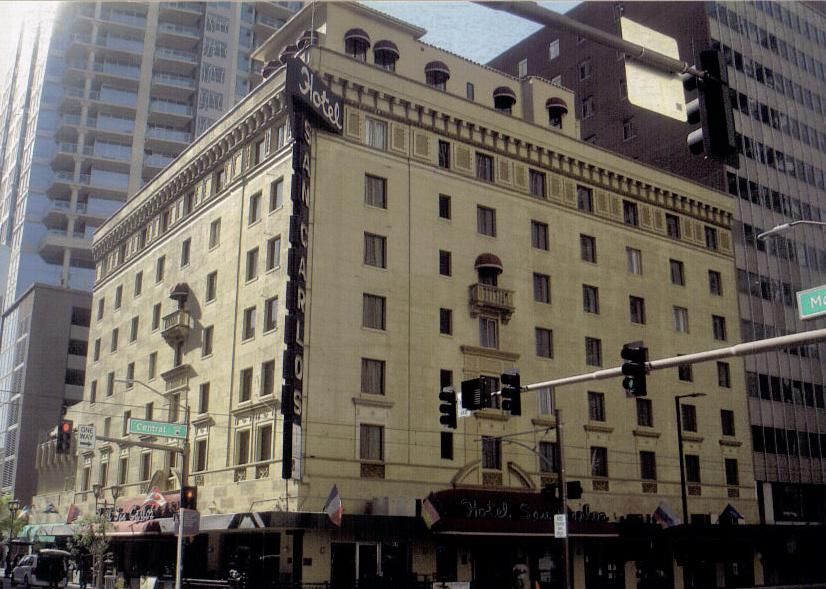
The San Carlos Hotel, also known as Hotel San Carlos, was built in 1925 and is located at 202 N. Central Ave.. Mae West, Clark Gable, Carole Lombard, Marilyn Monroe and Gene Autry are among the celebrities who at one time stayed at the San Carlos. The hotel was added to the National Register of Historic Places in 1983. Reference number 83003498.

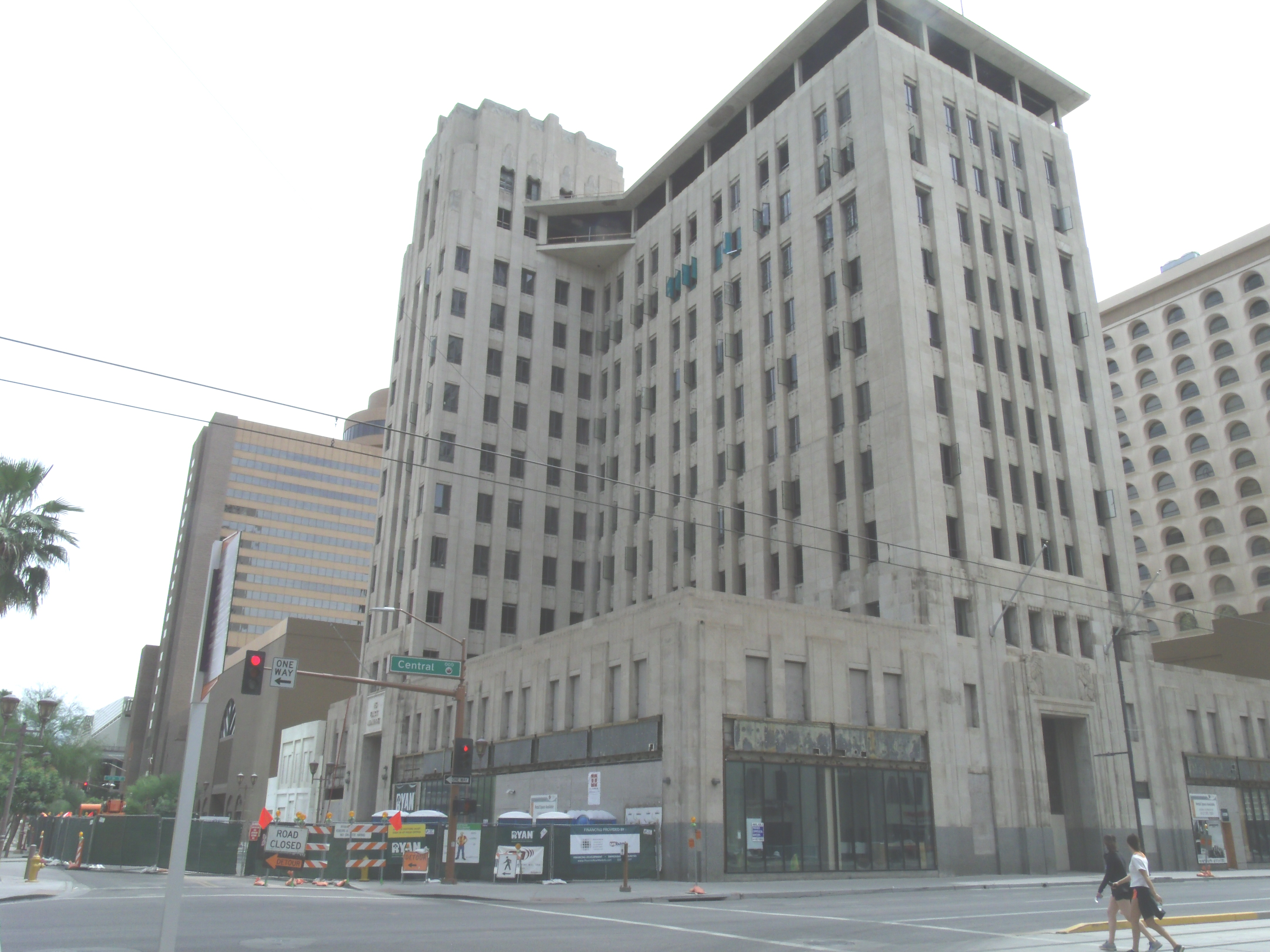
The Professional Building built in 1931 and located at 137 N. Central Ave. It was listed in the National Register of Historic Places in 1993, reference: #85003563.

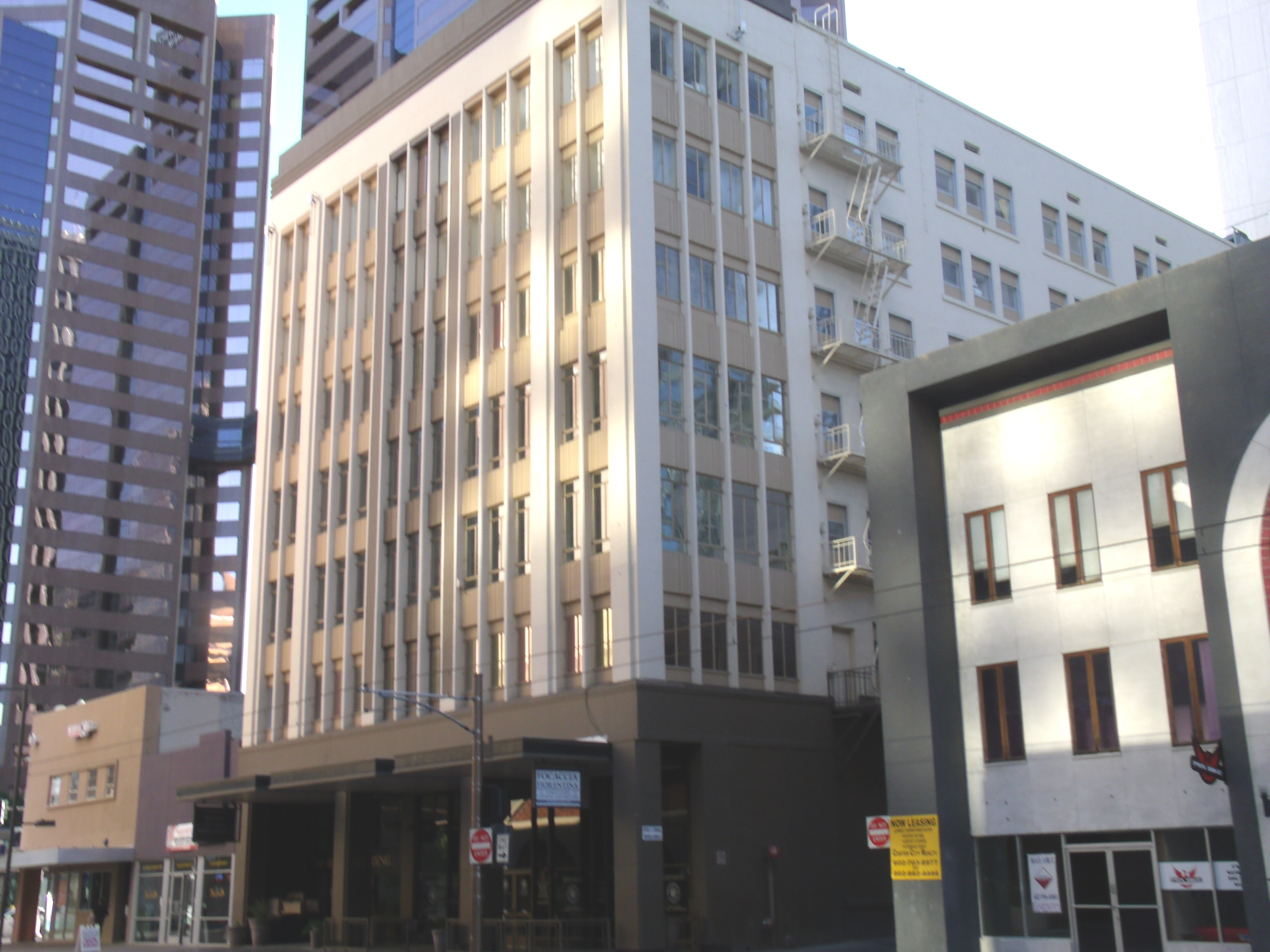
The Heard Building was built in 1920 and is located at 112 N. Central Ave.. It was Phoenix's first skyscraper. The building, which was listed in the National register of Historic Places on September 4, 1985, reference: #85002059, was featured in Alfred Hitchcocks 1960 film "Psycho".

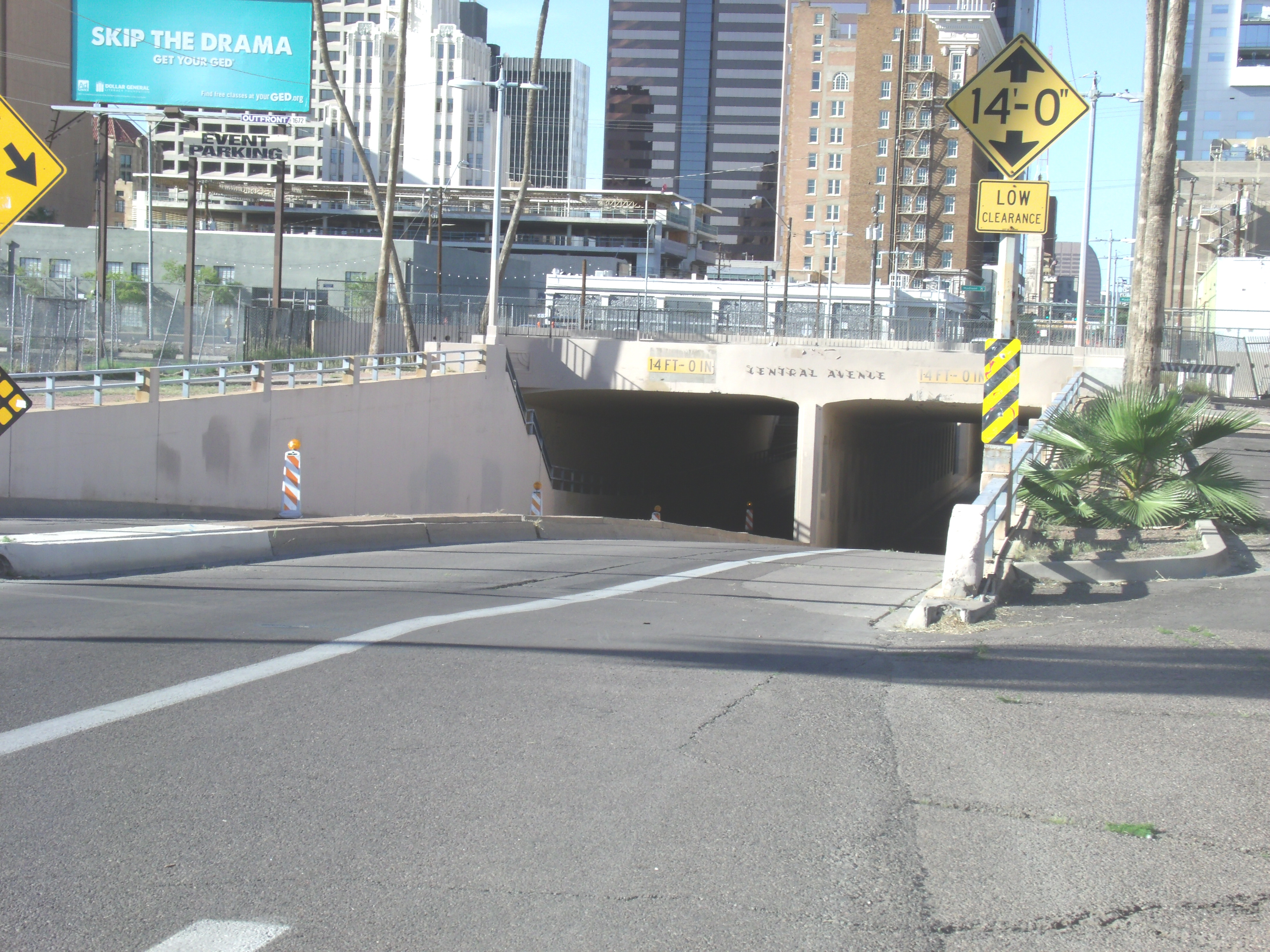
The Central Avenue Underpass was built in 1940 and is located on Central Avenue just south of Madison Street in downtown Phoenix. The above bridge was originally built for the ATSF railway.

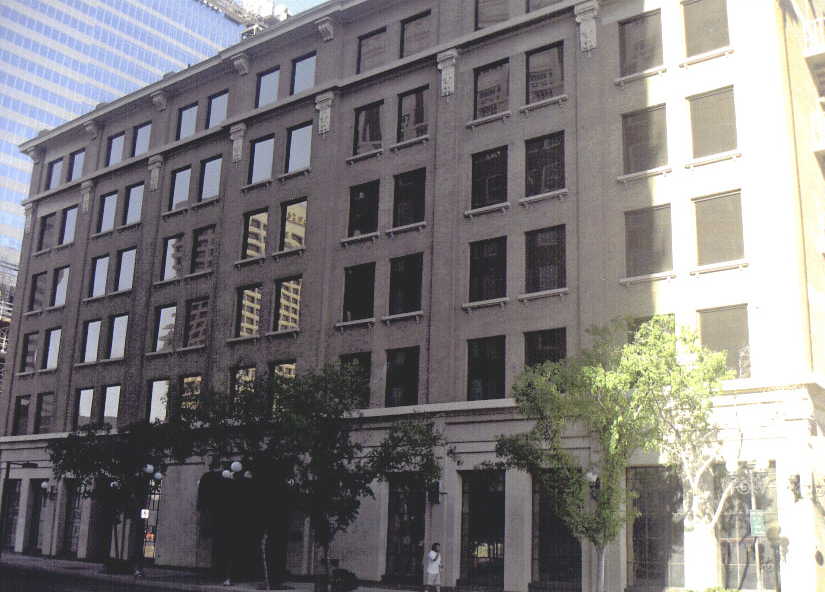
The Jefferson Hotel was built in 1915 and is located at 101 S. Central Ave in Phoenix, Arizona. It is no longer a hotel and is called the Barrister Place Building. The building is owned by the city of Phoenix and is currently the home to the Phoenix Police Museum (PHPR).

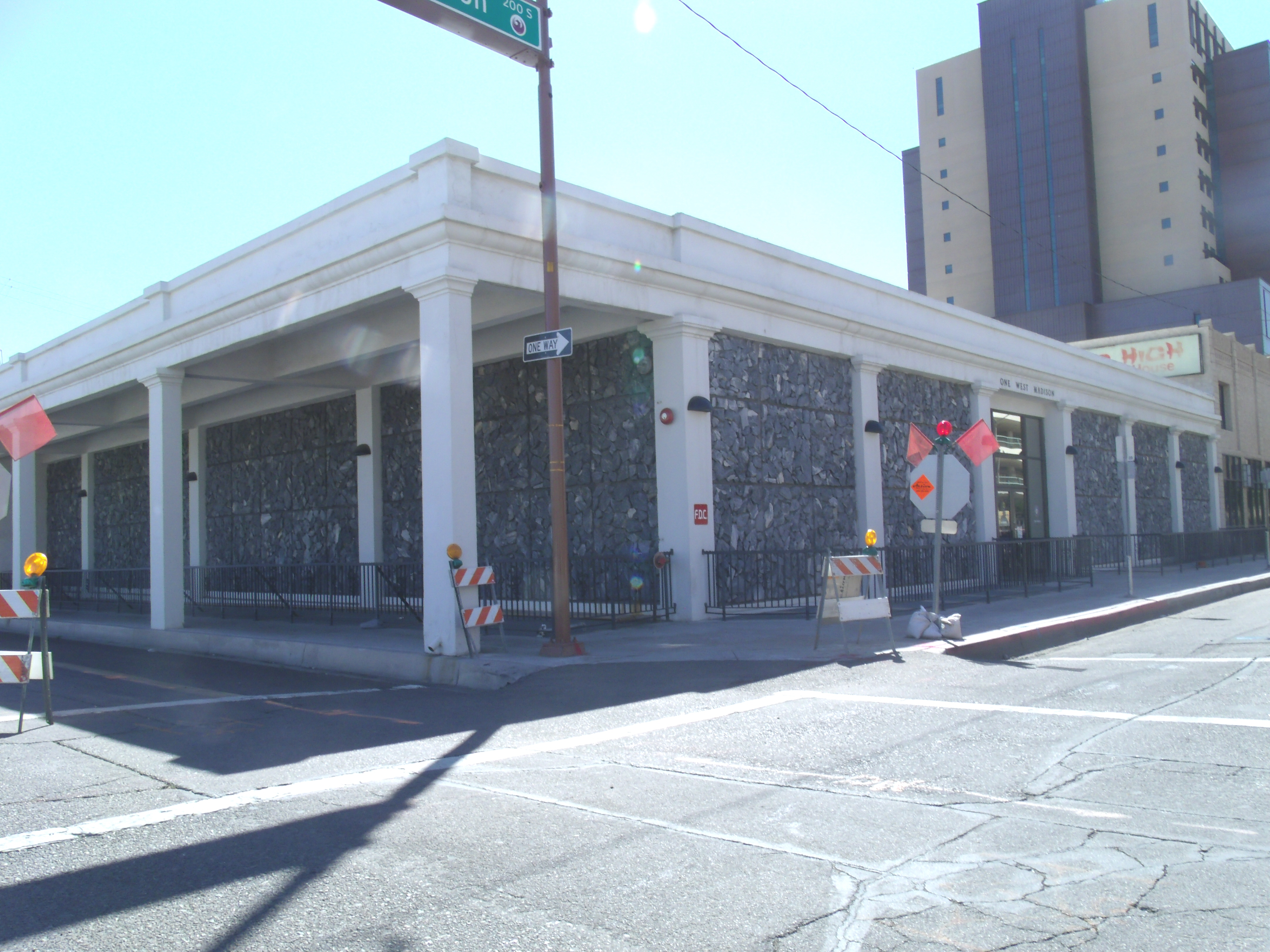
The Pratt-Gilbert Building was built in 1913 and is located at 200 S. Central Ave. / 1 W. Madison St. It was listed in the Phoenix Historic Properties Register in October 2001.

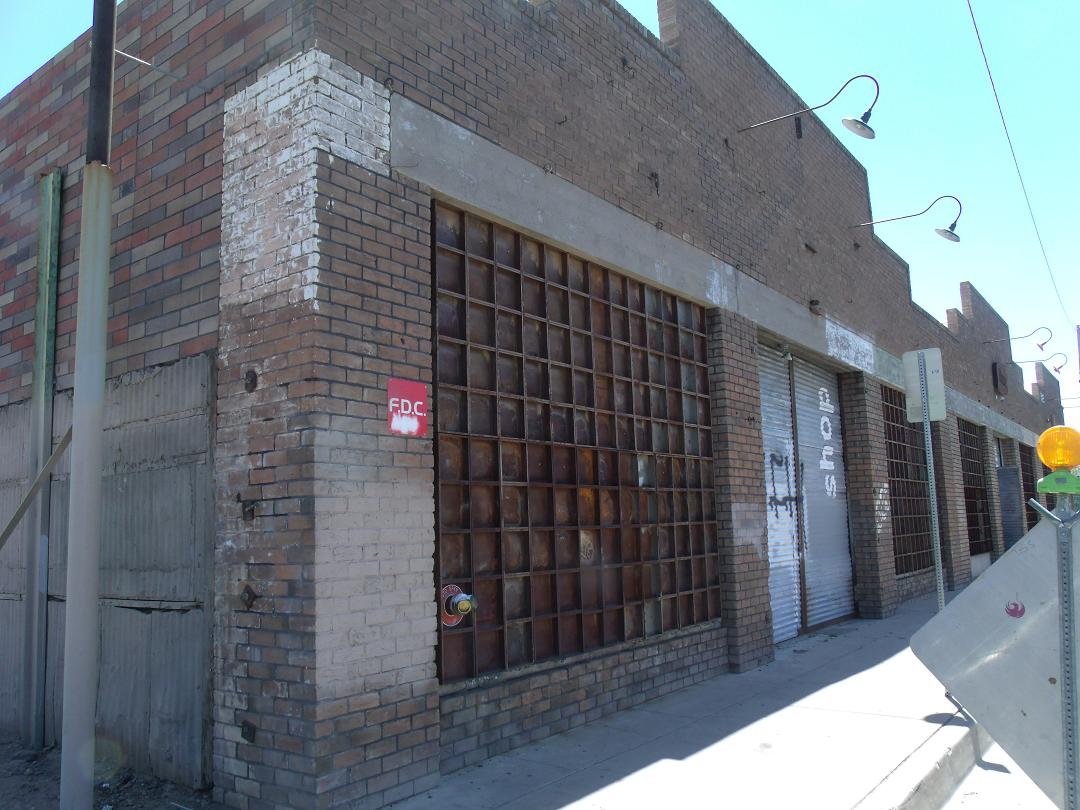
The Anchor Manufacturing Co., also known as 41-3, was built in 1925. It is located at 525 (525-551) S. Central Ave. The building was listed in the National Register of Historic Places in 1985, reference: #85002042.

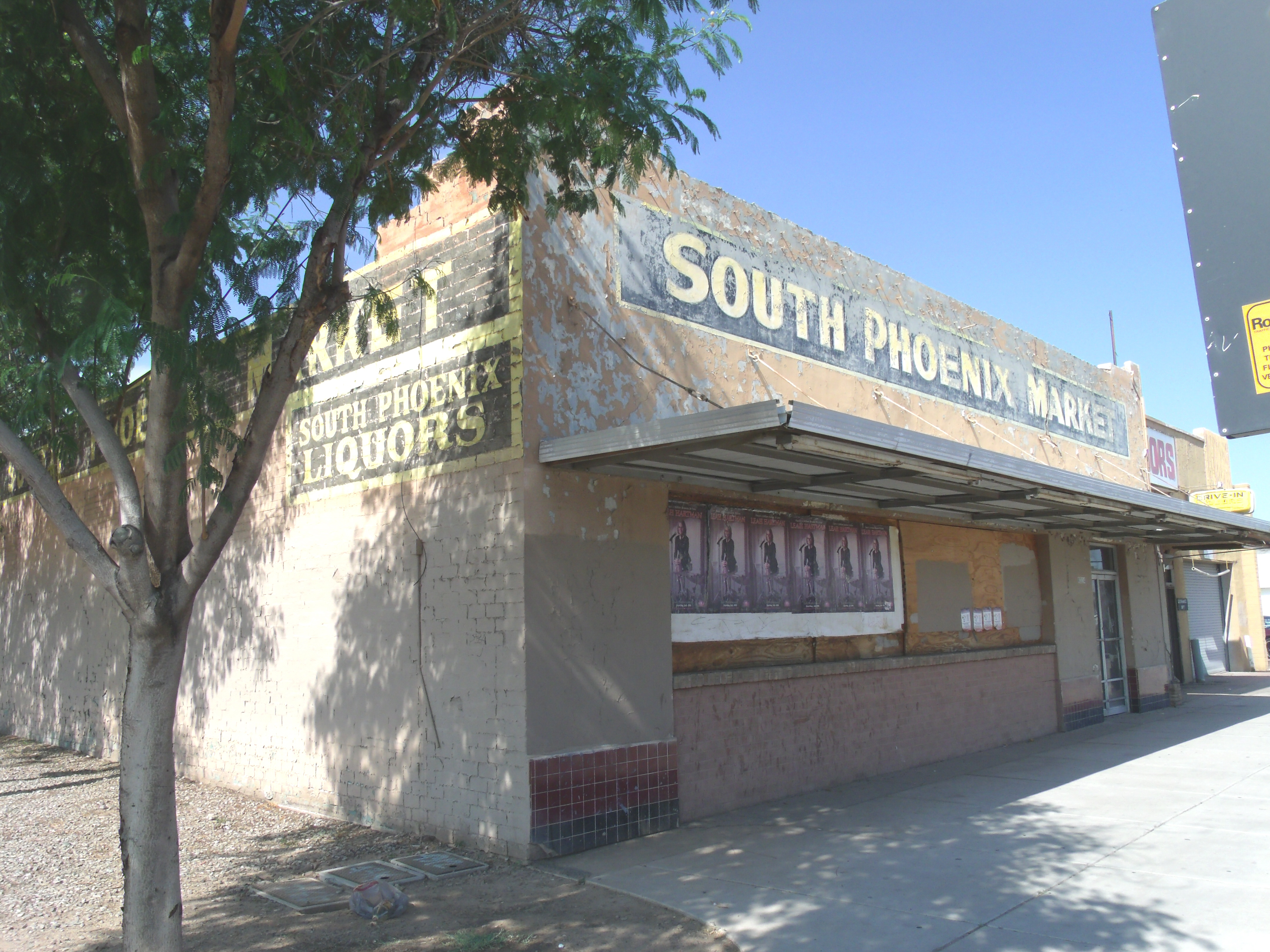
The South Phoenix Market building was built in 1948 and is located at 4341 S. Central Ave. This property is recognized as historic by the Asian American Historic Property Survey of the City of Phoenix.

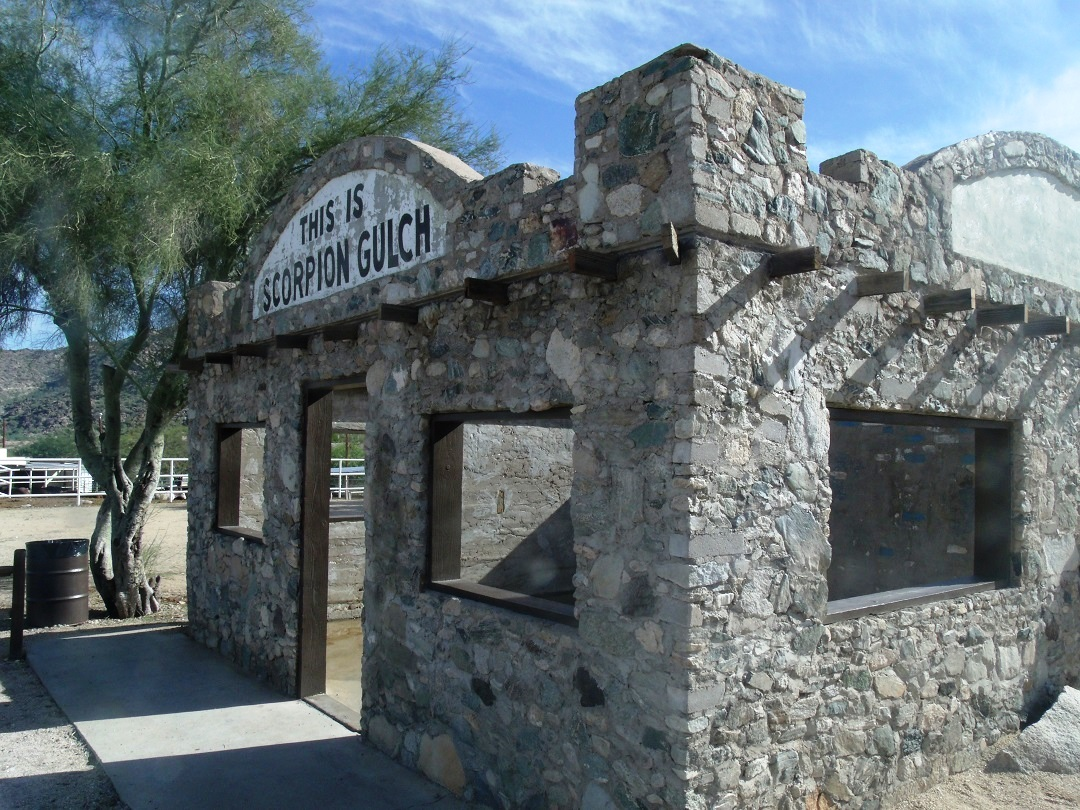
The Scorpion Gulch store was built in 1936 by William Lunsford. It is located at 10225 S. Central Ave. n South Mountain Park. It was listed in the Phoenix Historic Property Register in October 1990.

Part of the area has been known as Billionaires Row.

== See also ==
- Phoenix Historic Property Register
- List of historic properties in Phoenix
- Phoenix metropolitan area arterial roads
- Central City, Phoenix
- Encanto, Phoenix
- Phoenix City Square
