= Oldest McDonald's restaurant =

Hamburger stand in Downey, California

Coordinates: 33.9471°N 118.1182°W

- McDonald's Restaurant #3
- U.S. National Register of Historic Places
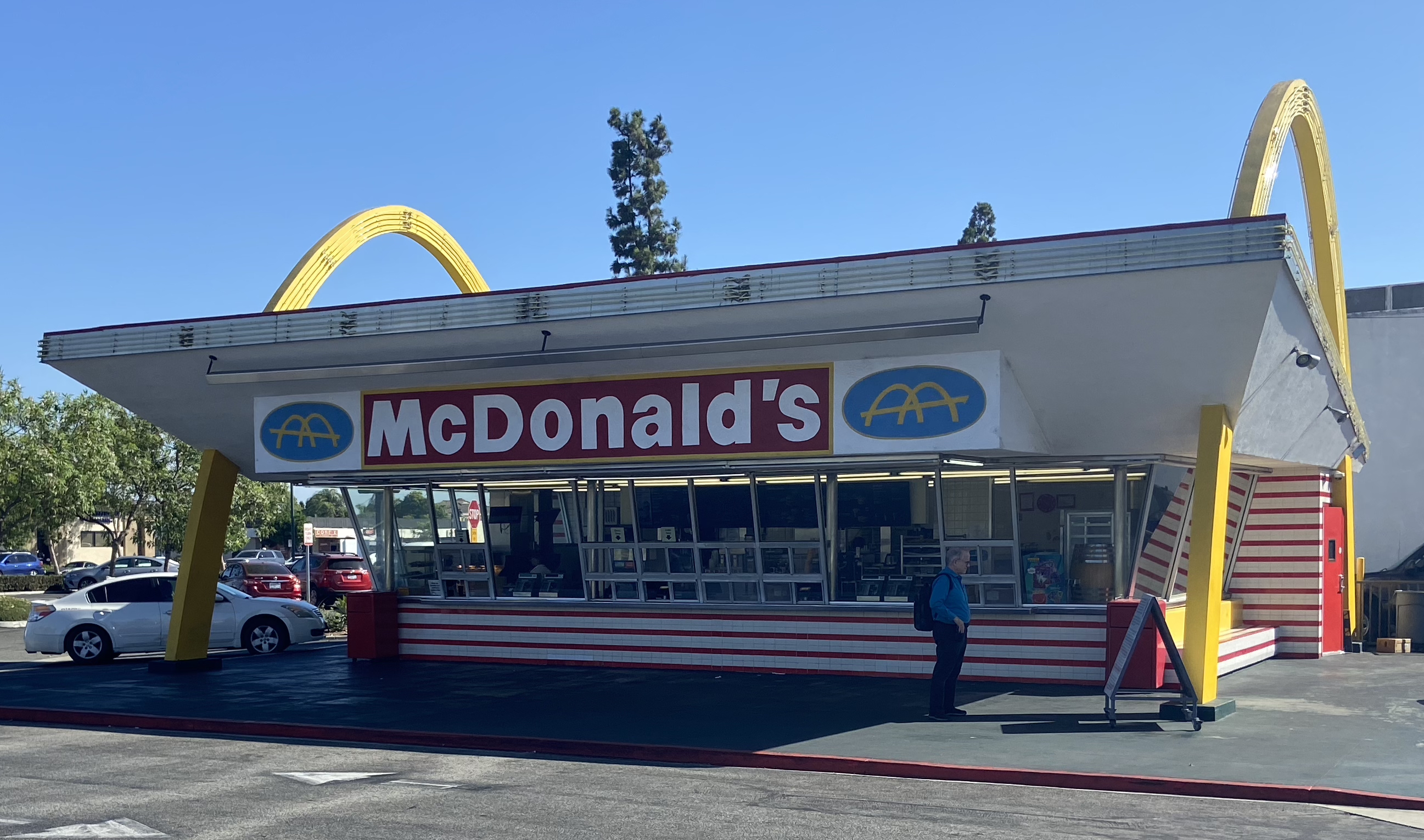
- The McDonald's in Downey, California, is almost unchanged in appearance since it opened in 1953. Photo taken on August 16, 2024.

- Location within California
- Location: 10207 Lakewood Blvd., Downey, California, United States
- Built: 1953; 73 years ago
- Architectural style: Googie architecture Modern architecture
- NRHP reference No.: 84003893

The oldest McDonald's restaurant is a walk-up serving stand at 10207 Lakewood Boulevard at Florence Avenue in Downey, California, United States. Opened on August 18, 1953, it is the third McDonald's restaurant outlet to be opened and is the second restaurant franchised by Richard and Maurice McDonald, before the involvement of Ray Kroc in the company. The outlet still retains the original, standardized Golden Arches façade design and is one of its main tourist attractions. Along with its sign, it was deemed eligible for addition to the National Register of Historic Places in 1984, although it was not added at the time because the owner objected.

The site of the first McDonald's restaurant in San Bernardino, California, is now occupied by an outlet that is the de facto headquarters of the Juan Pollo chicken restaurant chain, with an unofficial museum nearby.

== History ==
The original owners of the Downey, California, McDonald's were Roger Williams, the brother-in-law of McDonald's first franchisee Neil Fox, and his business partner Bud Landon. Williams and Fox worked for Occidental Petroleum and used their expertise in siting Occidental gasoline stations in choosing the location. Like the McDonald brothers' other franchisees, they were required to use Stanley Clark Meston's design.

The purchase of the chain from the McDonald brothers by Ray Kroc did not affect the Downey restaurant, as it was franchised under an agreement with the McDonald brothers, not with Kroc's company McDonald's Systems, Inc., which later became McDonald's Corporation. As a result, the restaurant was not subject to the modernization requirements that McDonald's Corporation placed on its franchisees. Its menu came to differ from that of other McDonald's restaurants, and lacked items such as the Big Mac that were developed by the corporation. In part due to these differences, as well as a corporate McDonald's opening in the mid-1970s less than half a mile away, the restaurant suffered from poor sales, and was eventually acquired by McDonald's Corporation in 1990, when it was the only remaining McDonald's that was independent of the chain.

With low sales, damage from the 1994 Northridge earthquake, and the lack of a drive-thru window and indoor seating, the restaurant was closed, and McDonald's planned to demolish it and incorporate some of its features in a modern "retro" restaurant nearby. However, it was listed on the National Trust for Historic Preservation's 1994 list of the 11 Most Endangered Historic Places. With both the public and preservationists demanding the restaurant be saved, McDonald's spent two years restoring the restaurant and reopened it. The restaurant now features an adjacent museum and gift shop housed in a replica of the original McDonald's location in San Bernardino. A drive-thru window was added in between 2016-2017.

== Gallery ==
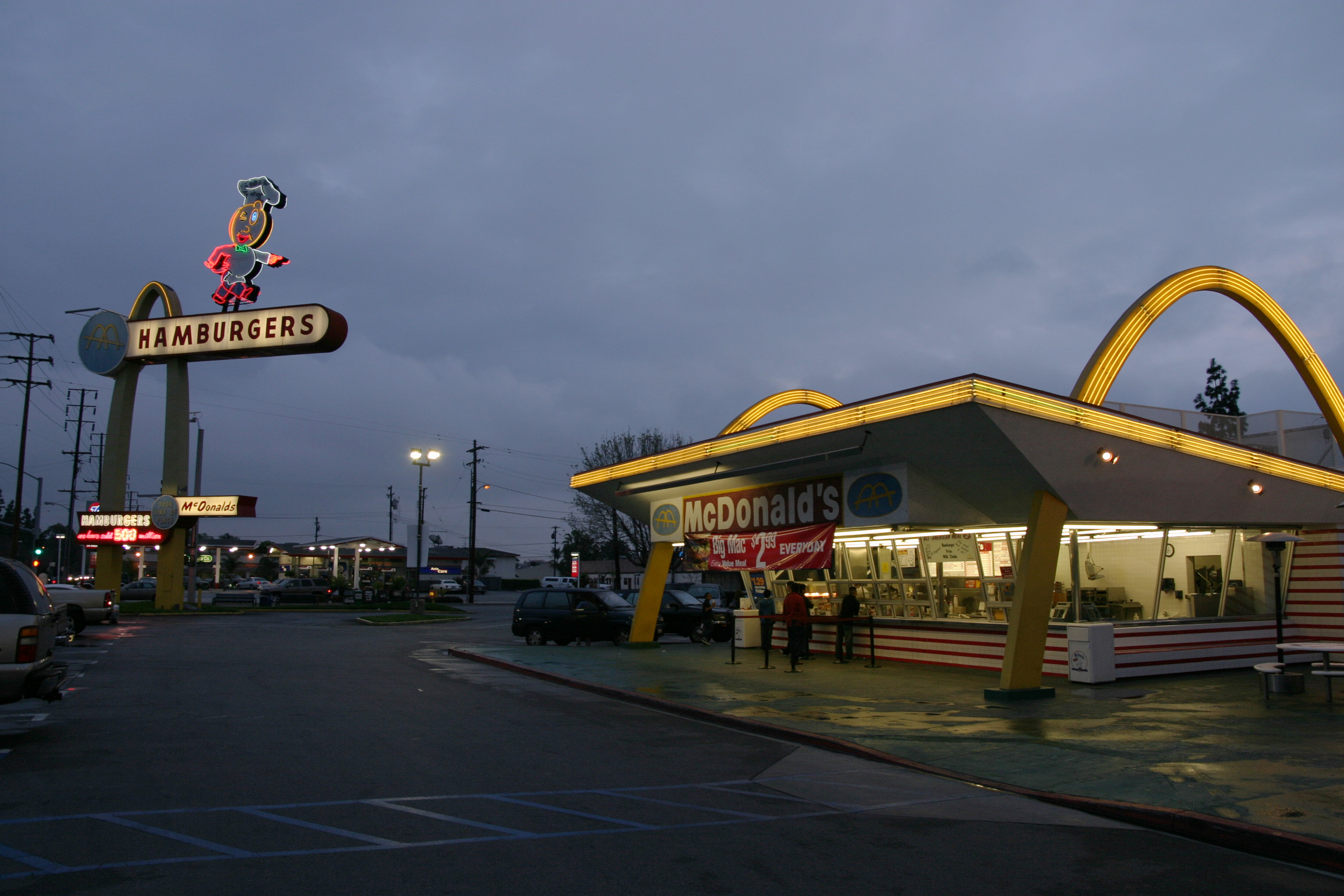
The restaurant at night in 2007

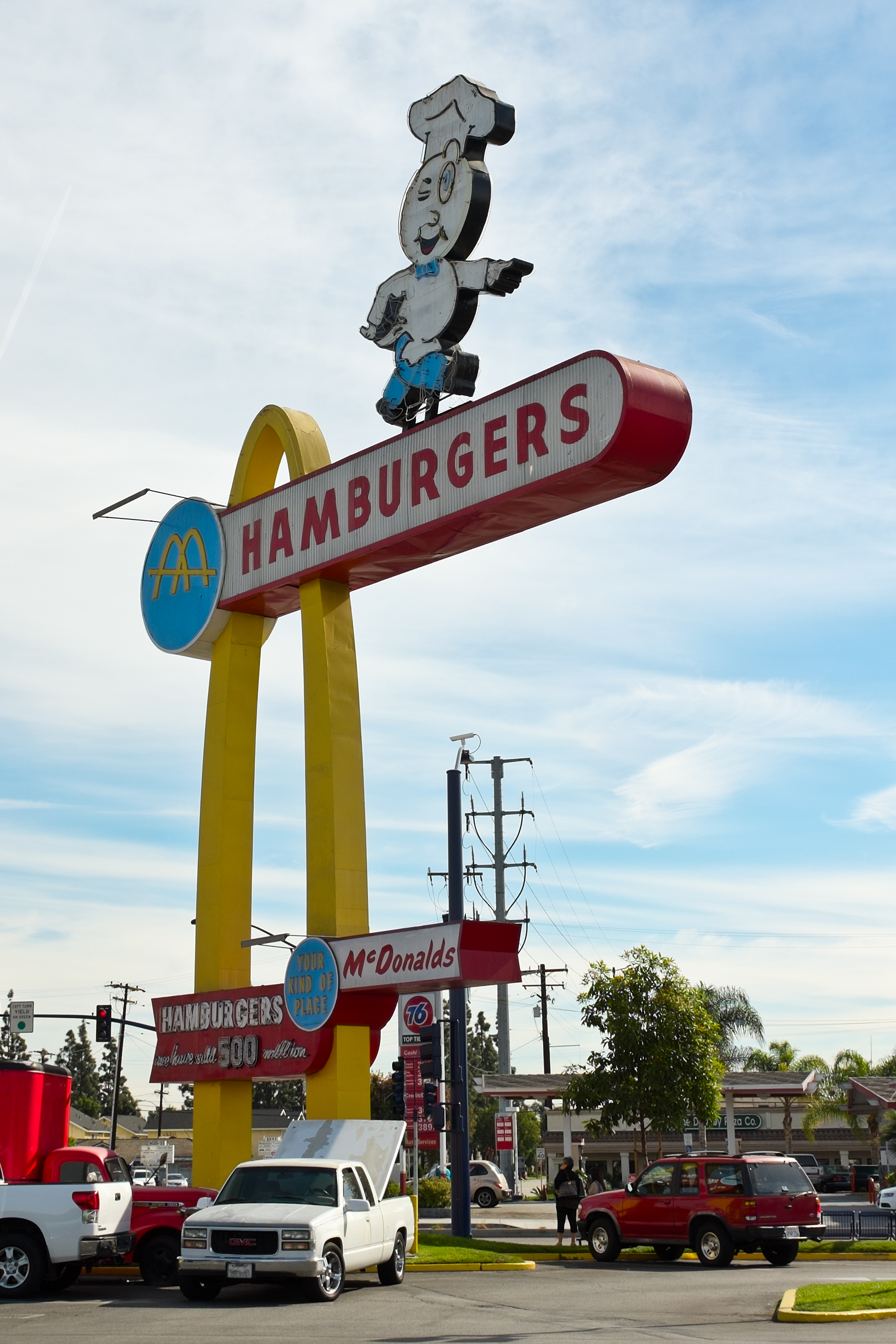
The sign outside the Downey McDonald's in 2014

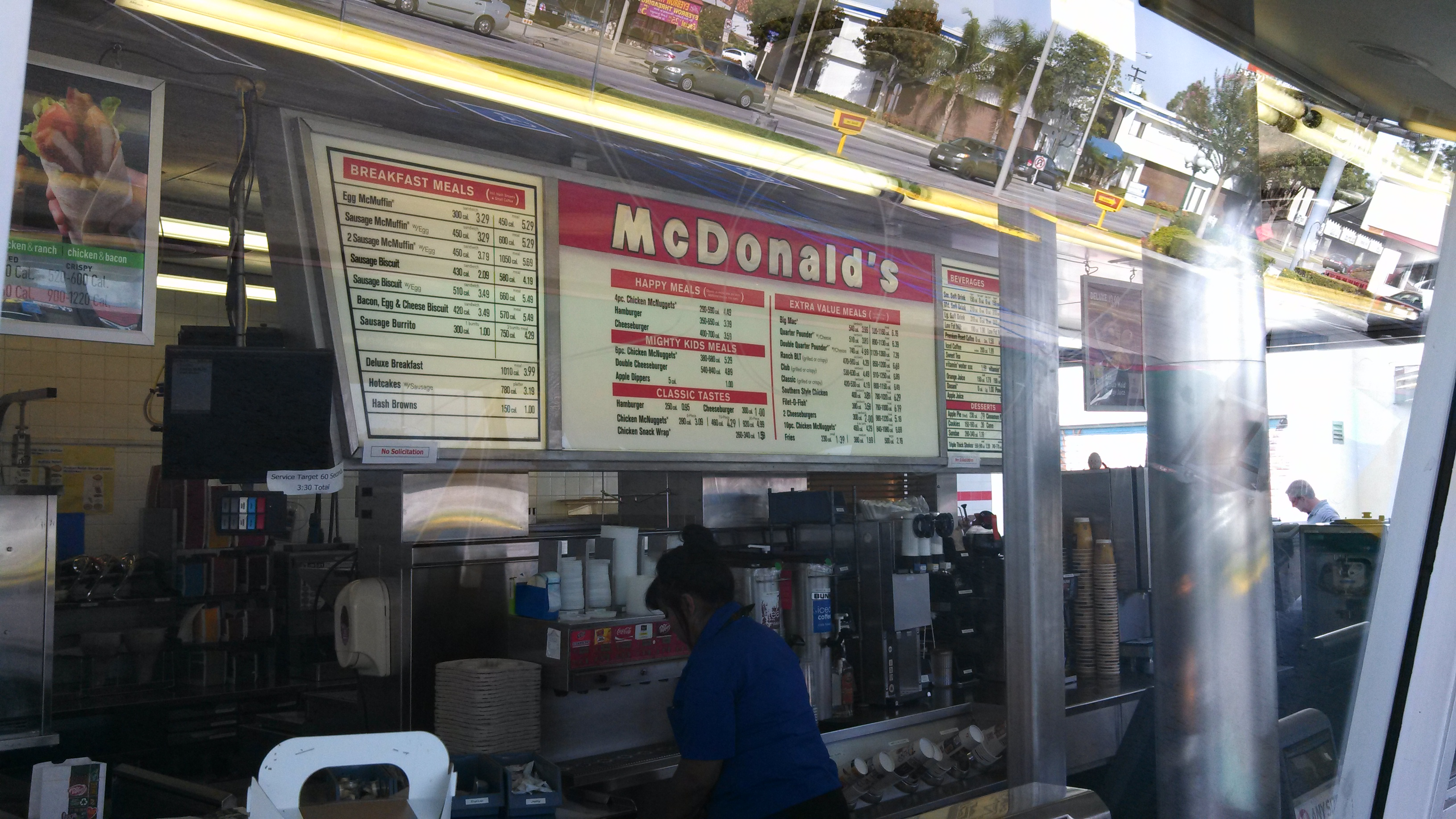
A view of the inside of the Downey McDonald's

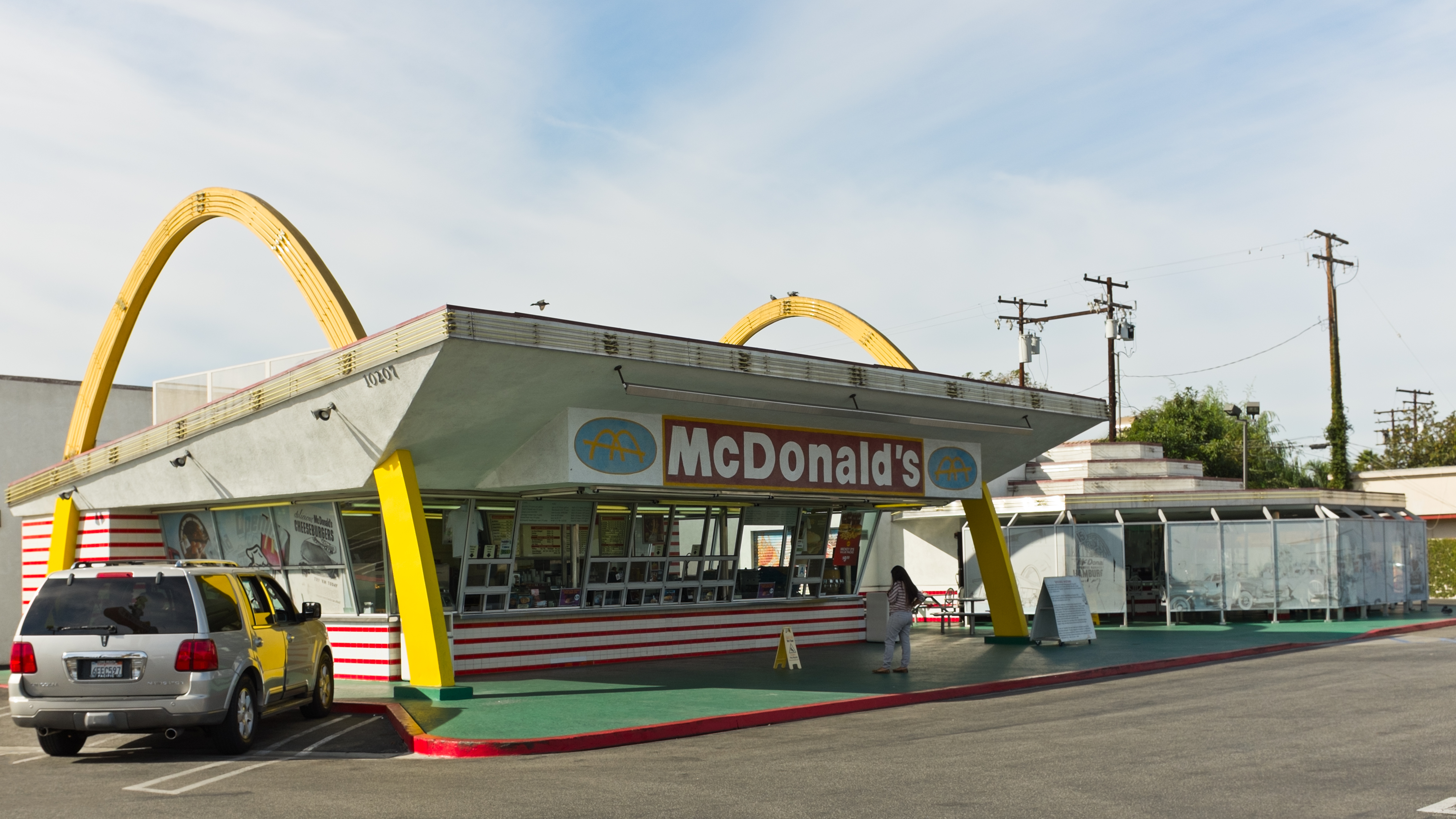
Another view from the outside of the Downey McDonald's in 2014, with the museum to the right

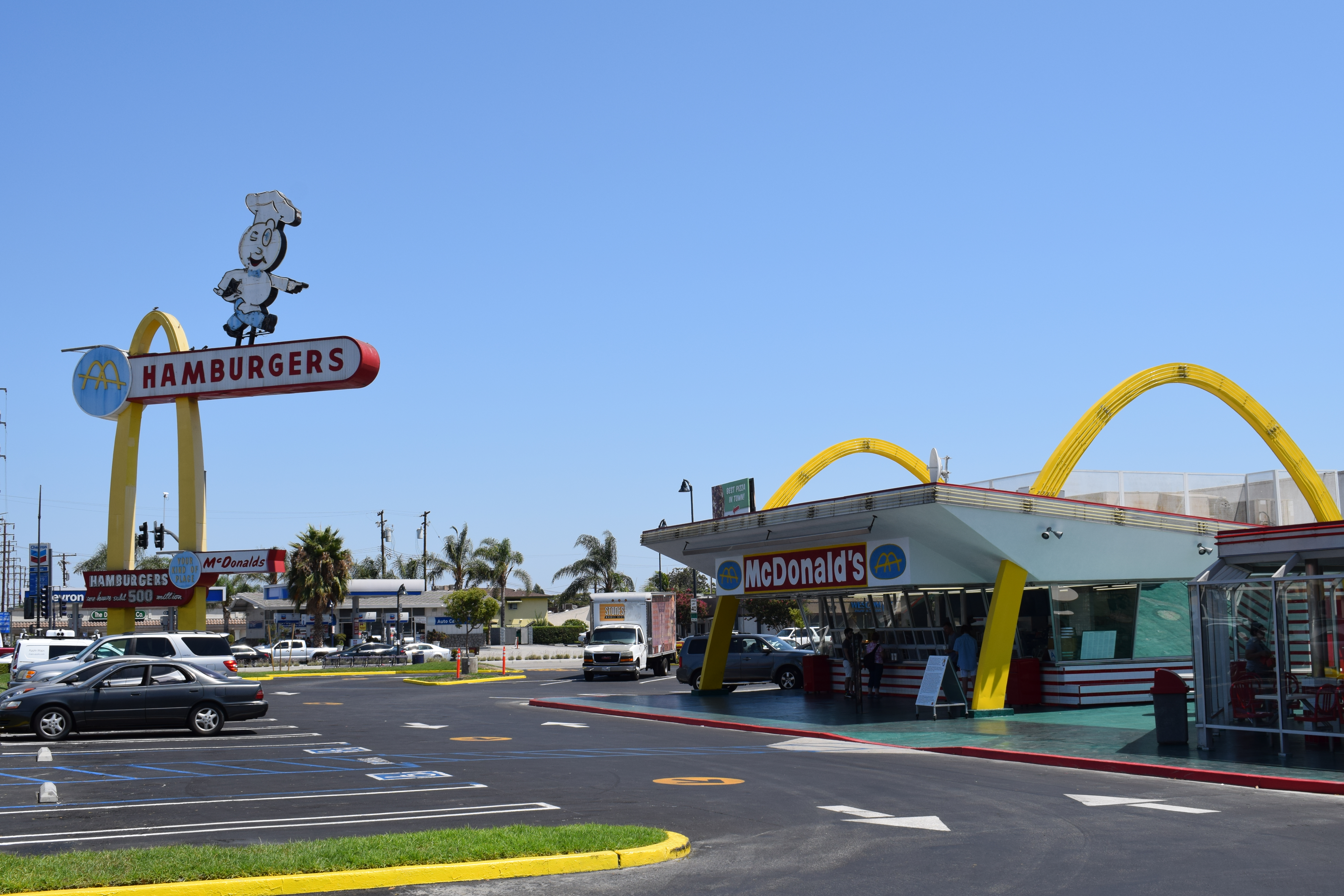
The Downey McDonald's in 2017

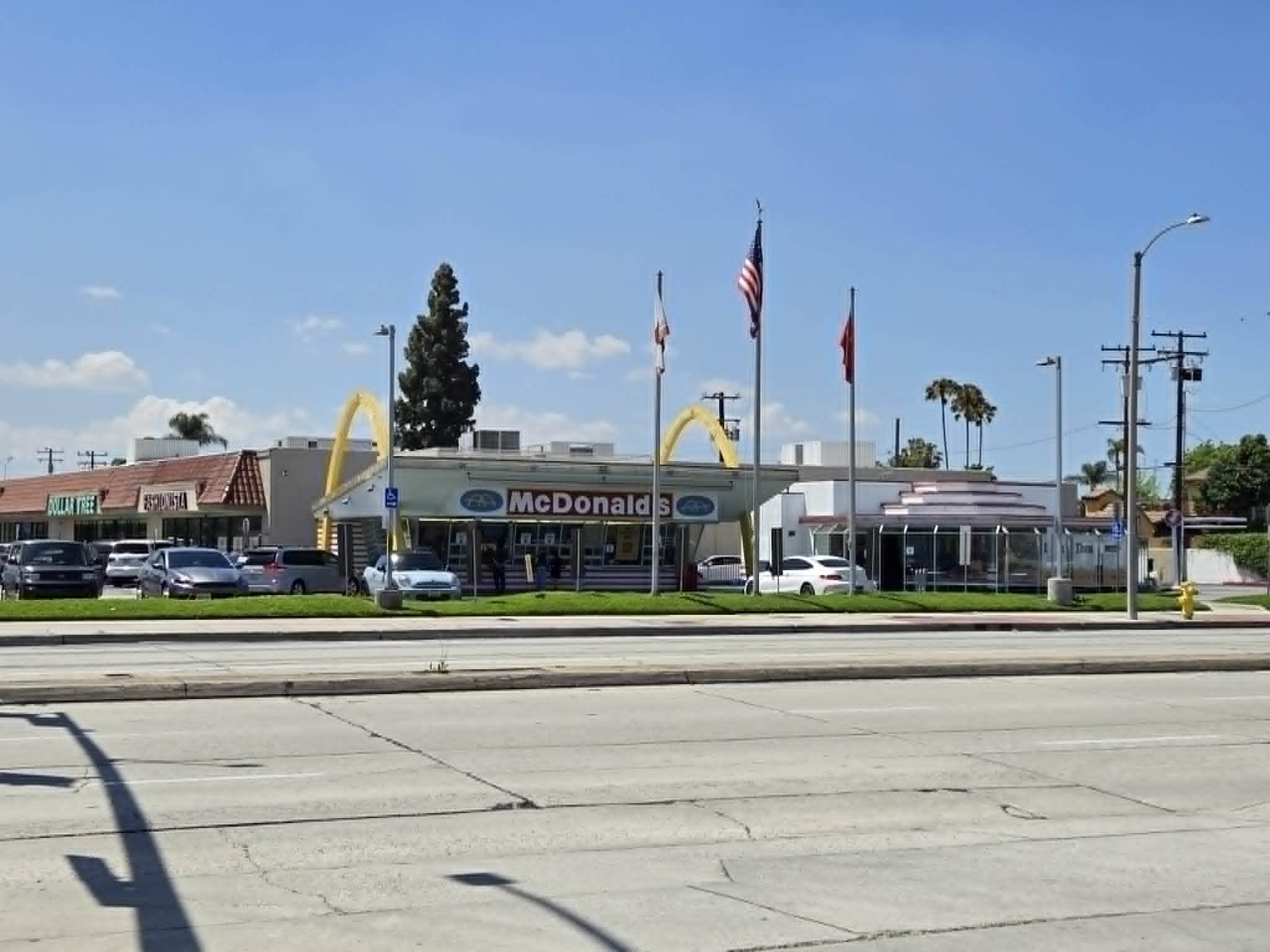
Full outside view in 2026

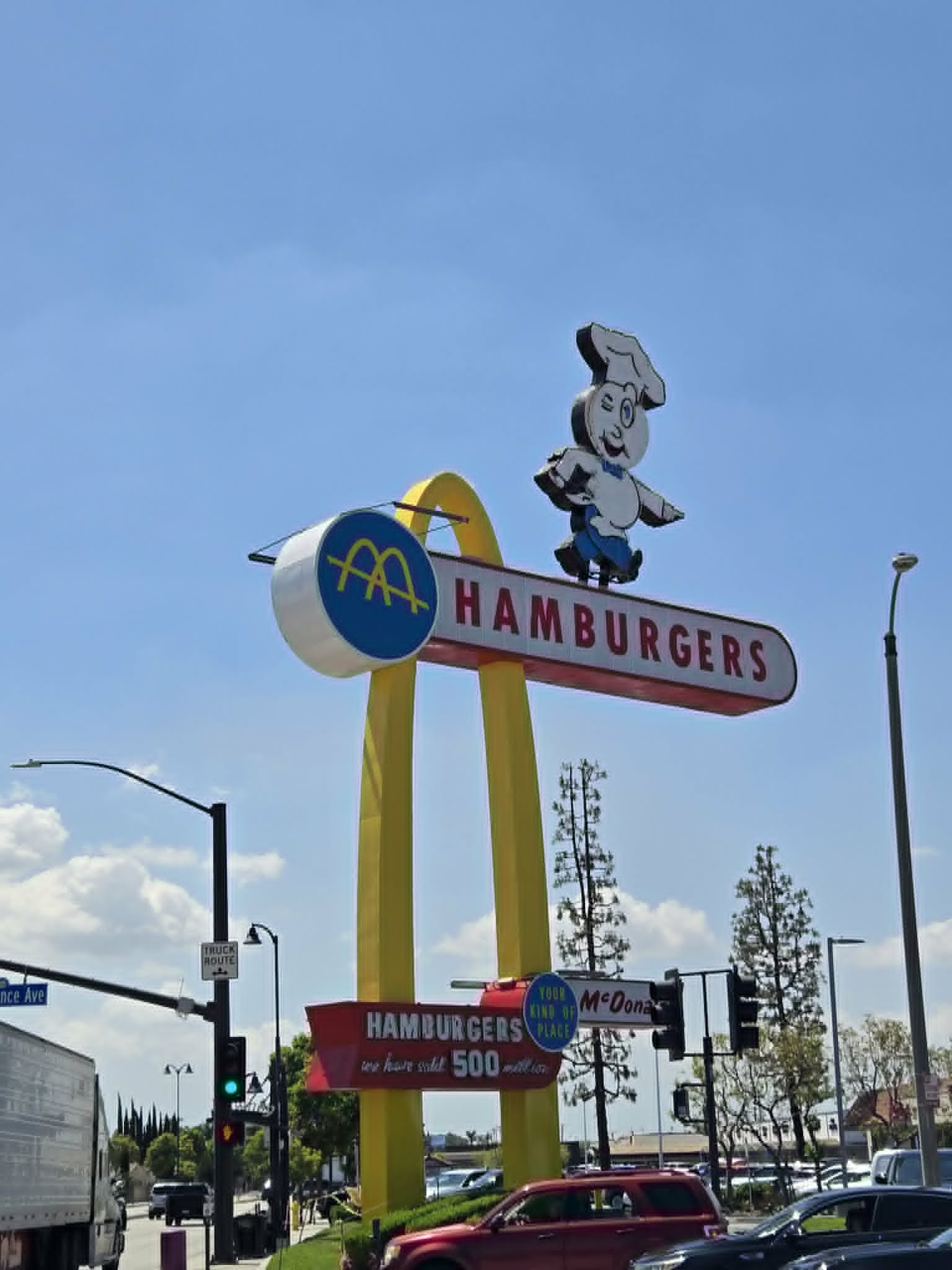
The sign outside the Downey McDonald's in 2026

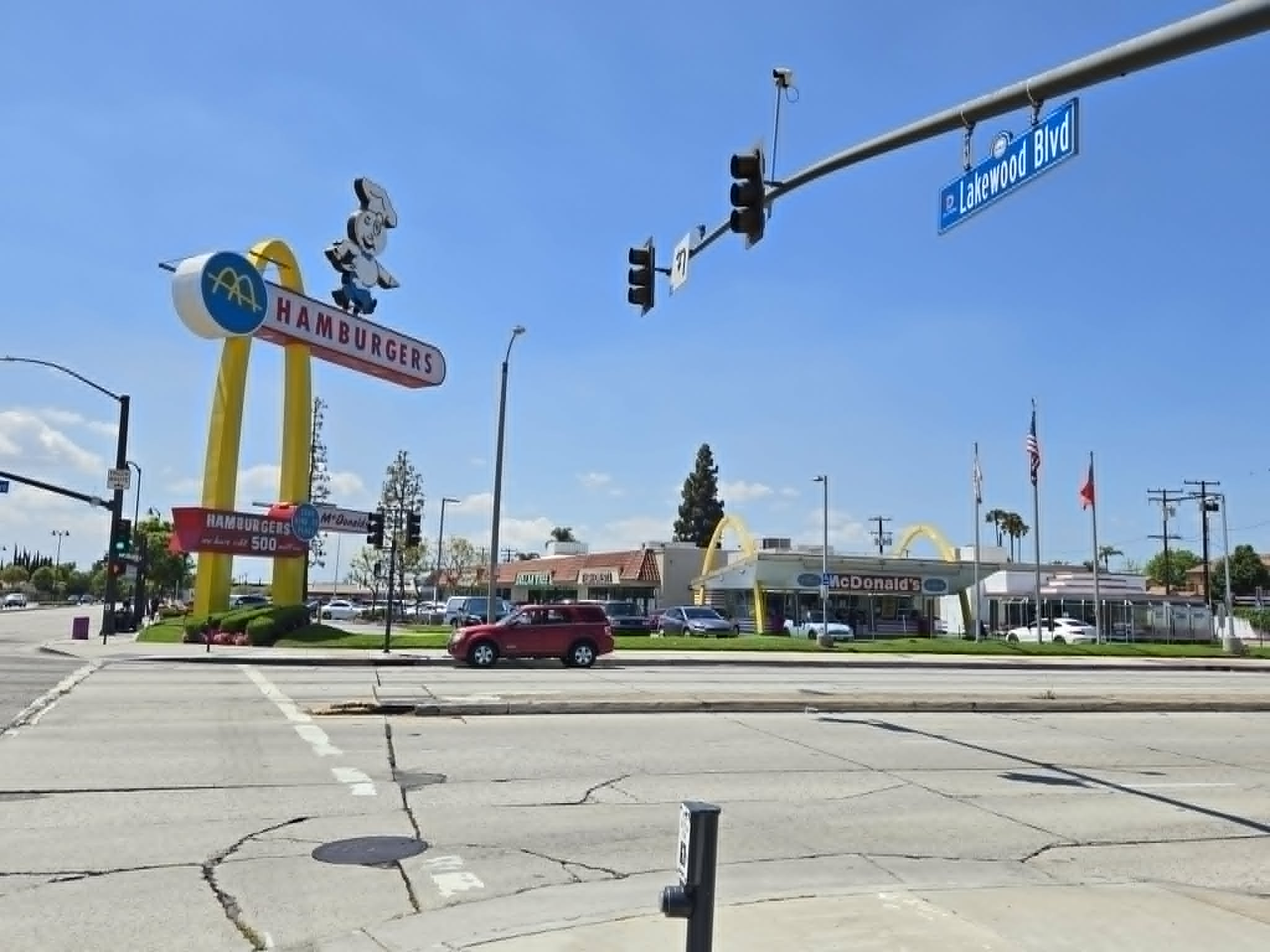
Full outside restaurant view with the sign included in 2026

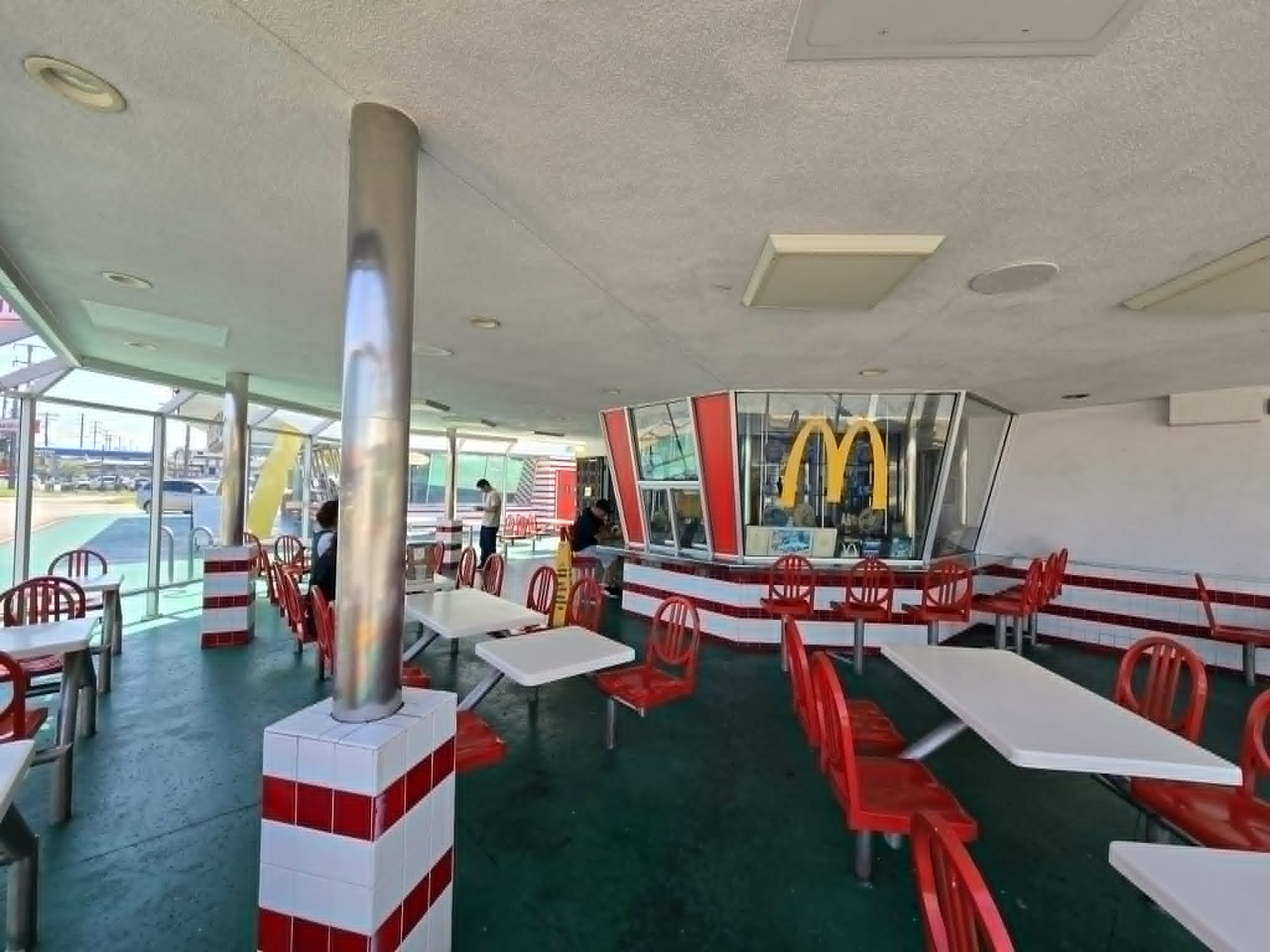
Inside patio view in 2026

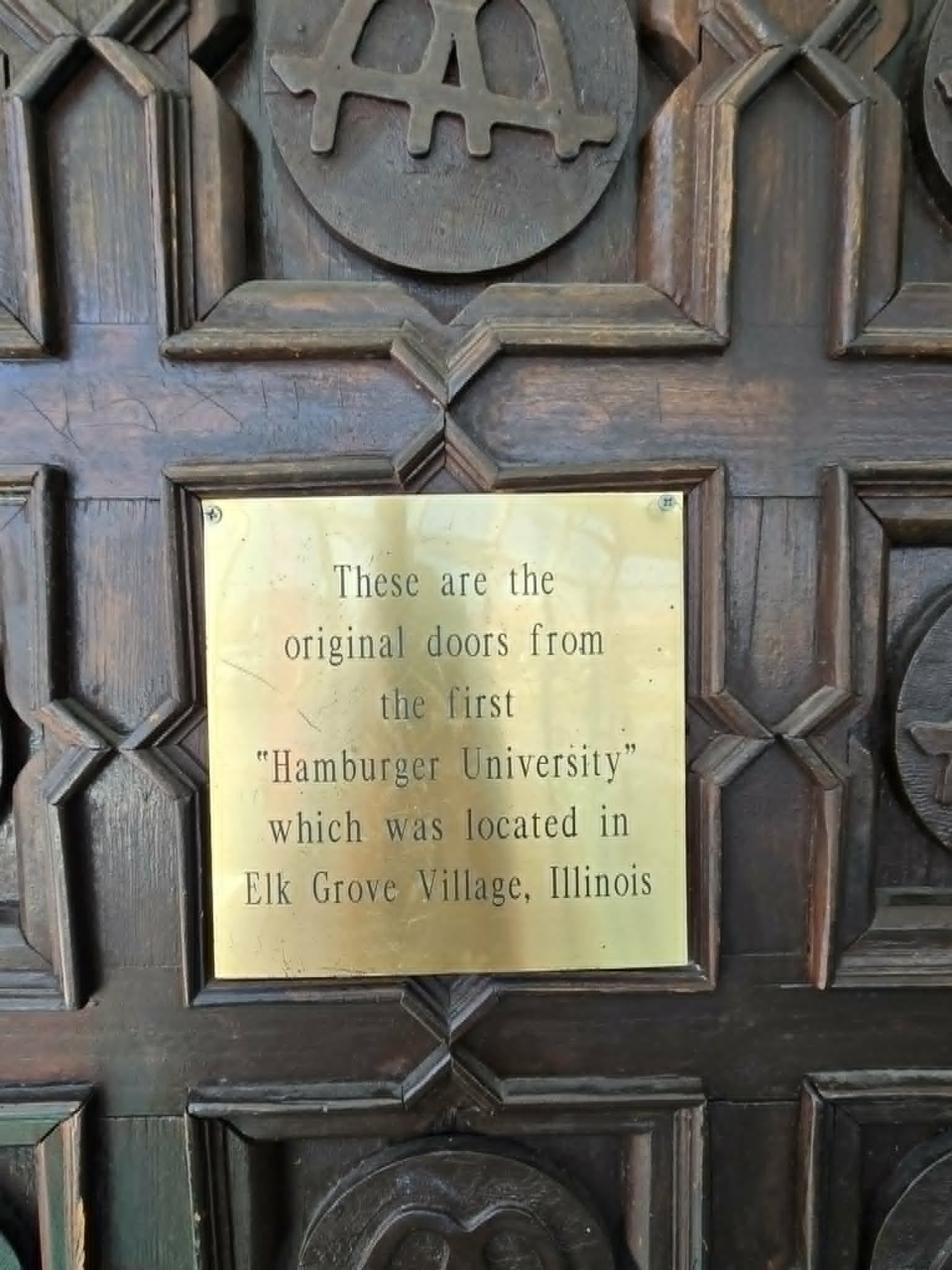
Original doors from the first "Hamburger University" plaque in 2026

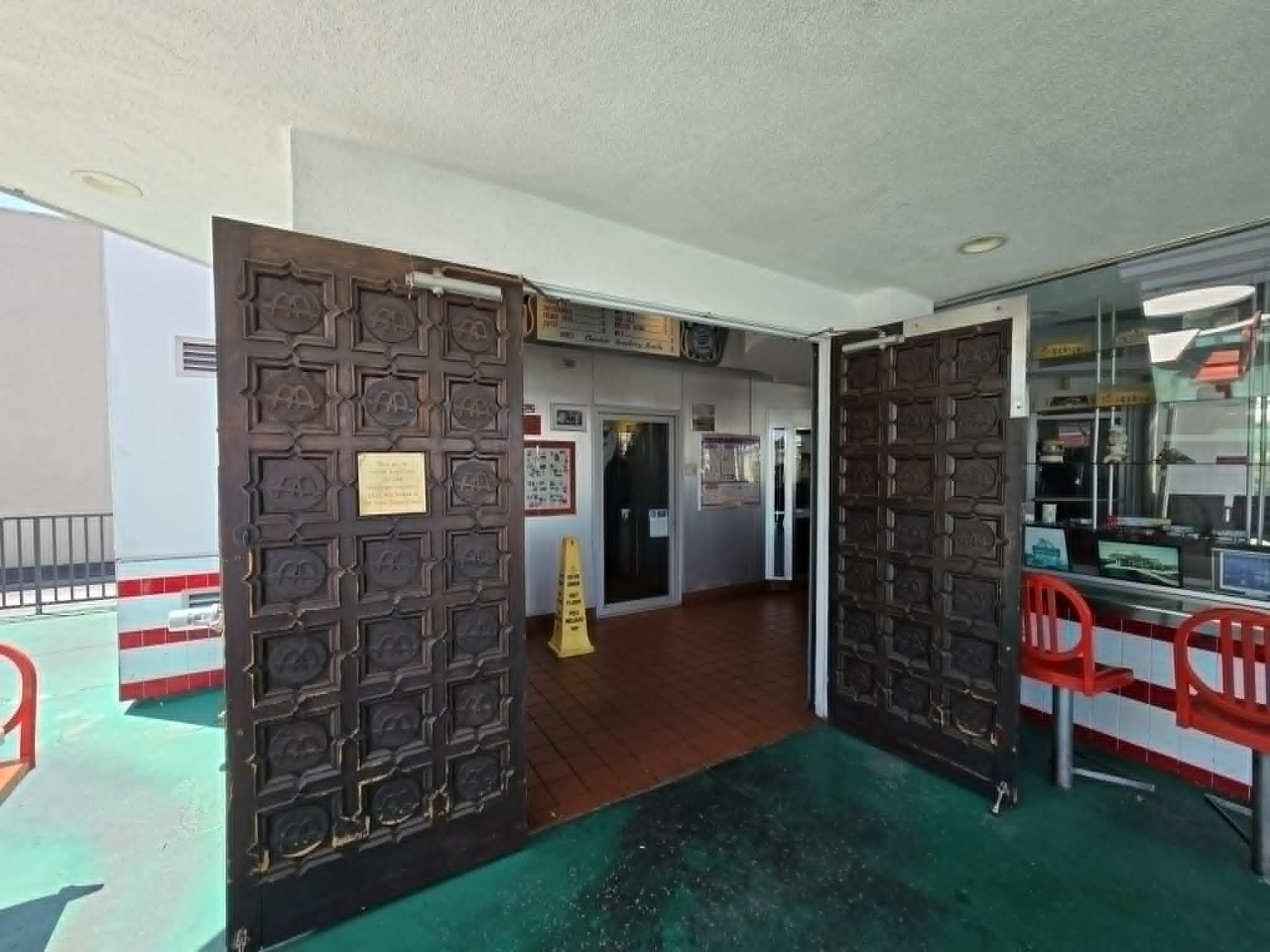
Original doors from the first "Hamburger University" full view in 2026

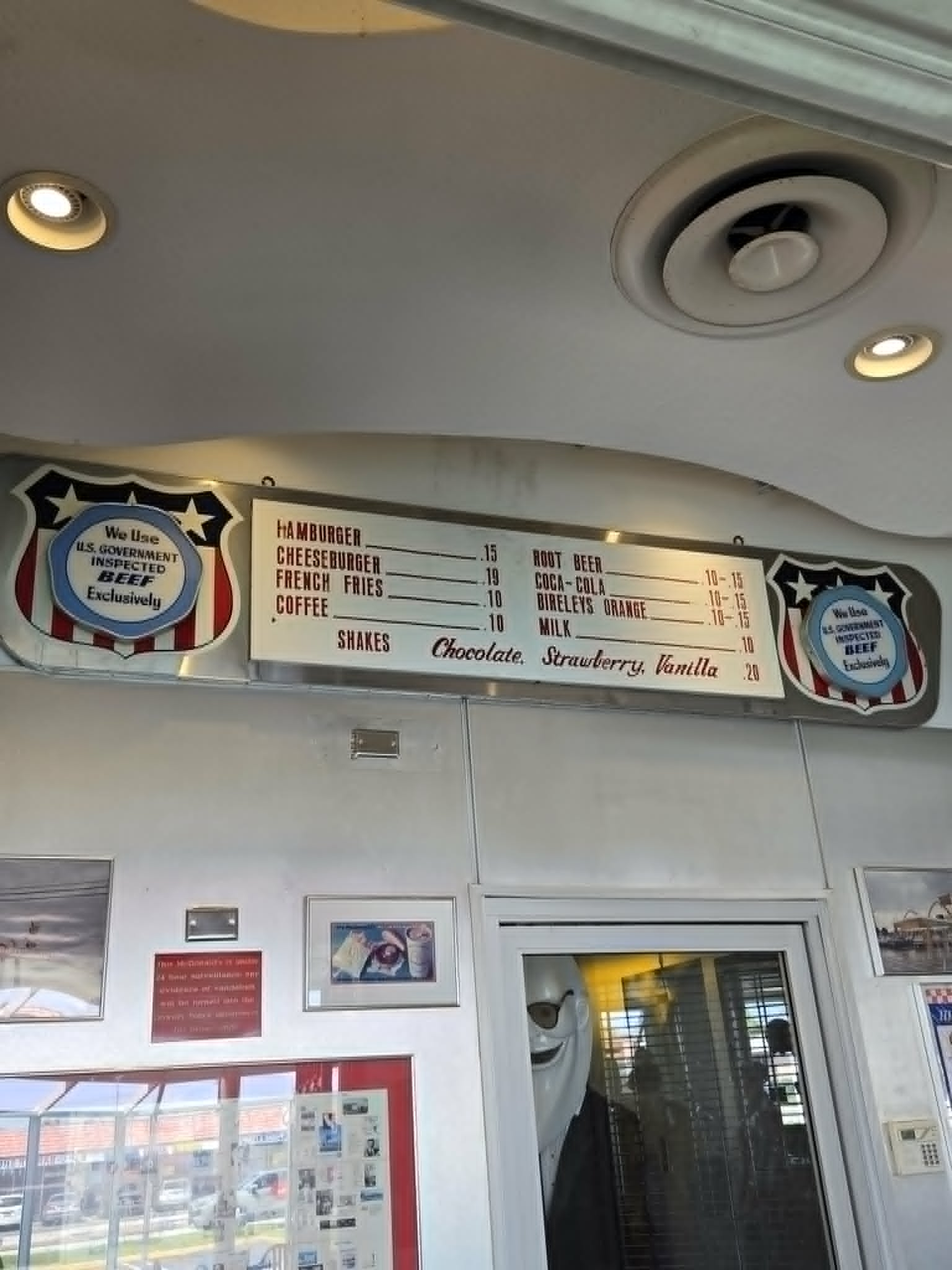
McDonald's old menu sign in 2026

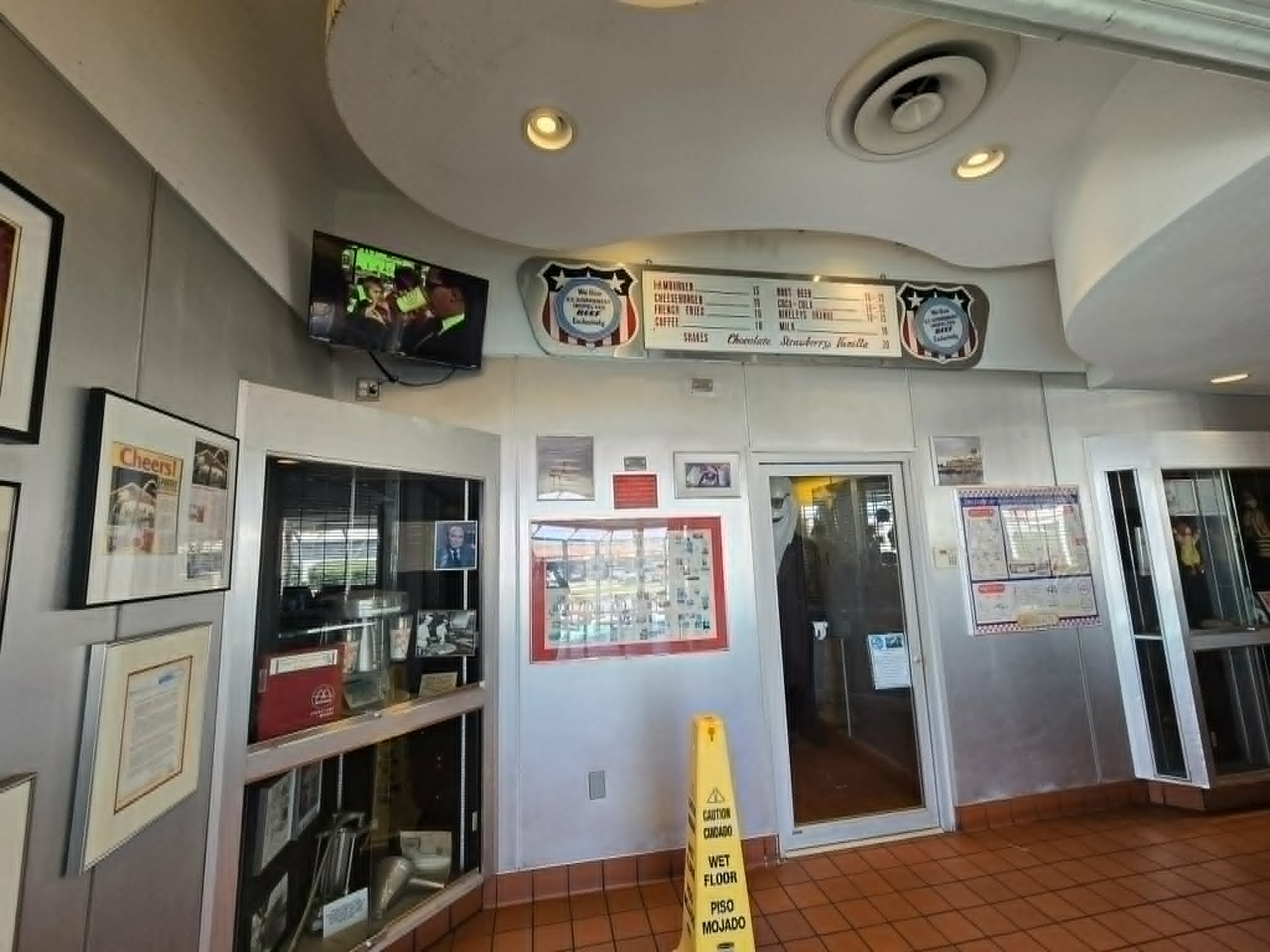
Entrance view of the mini museum in 2026

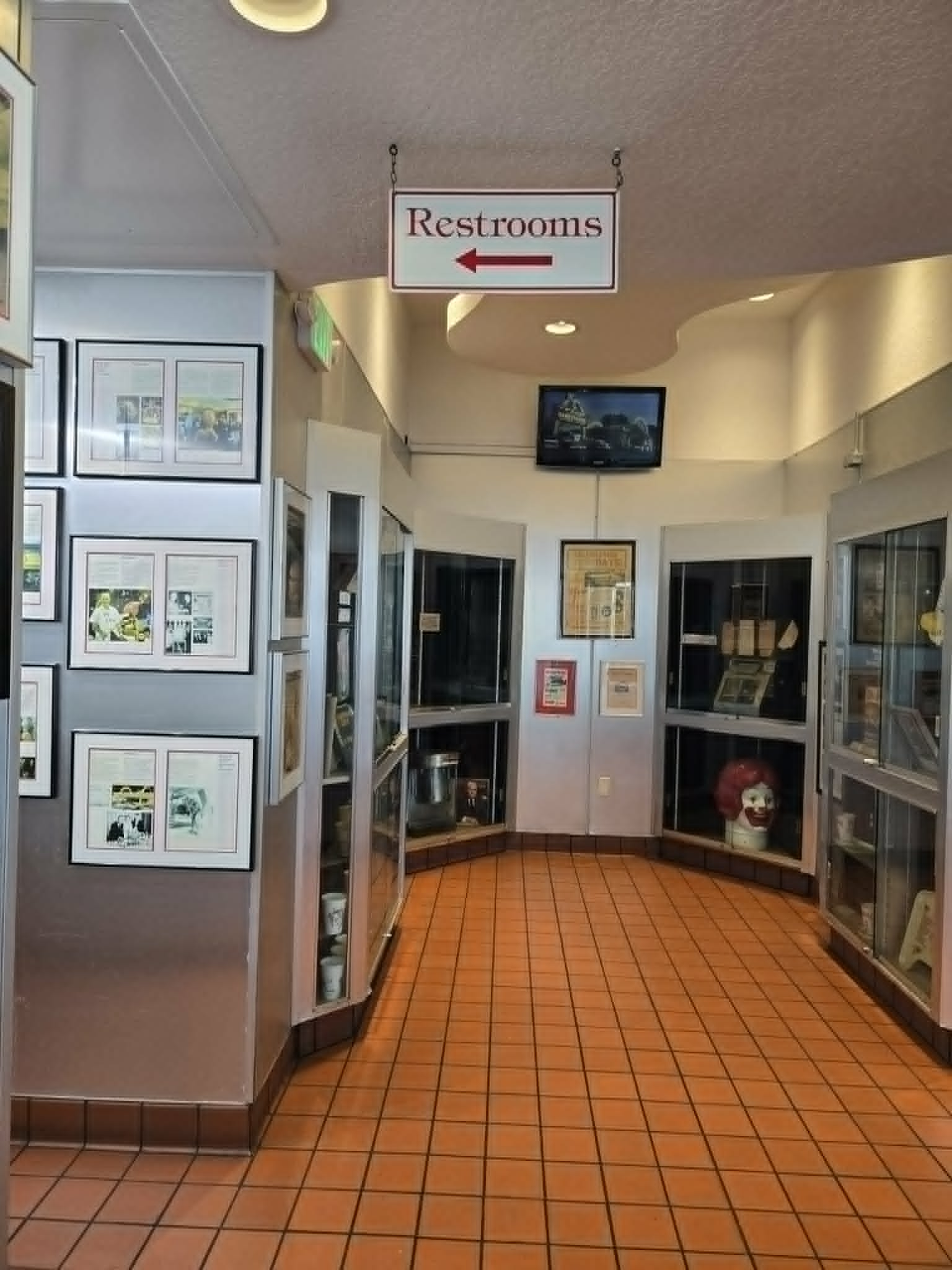
Right hand view of the mini museum in 2026

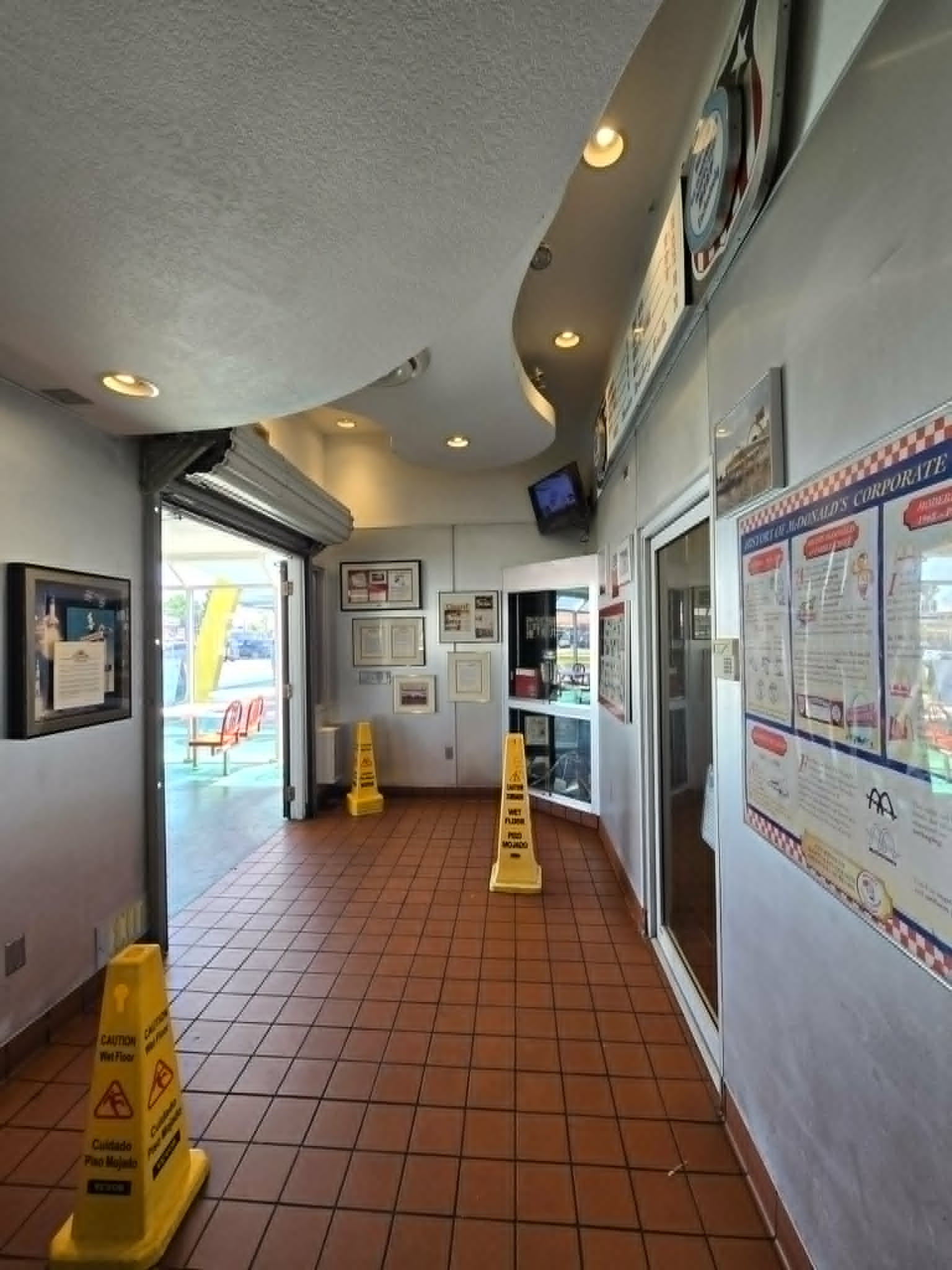
Left hand view of the mini museum in 2026

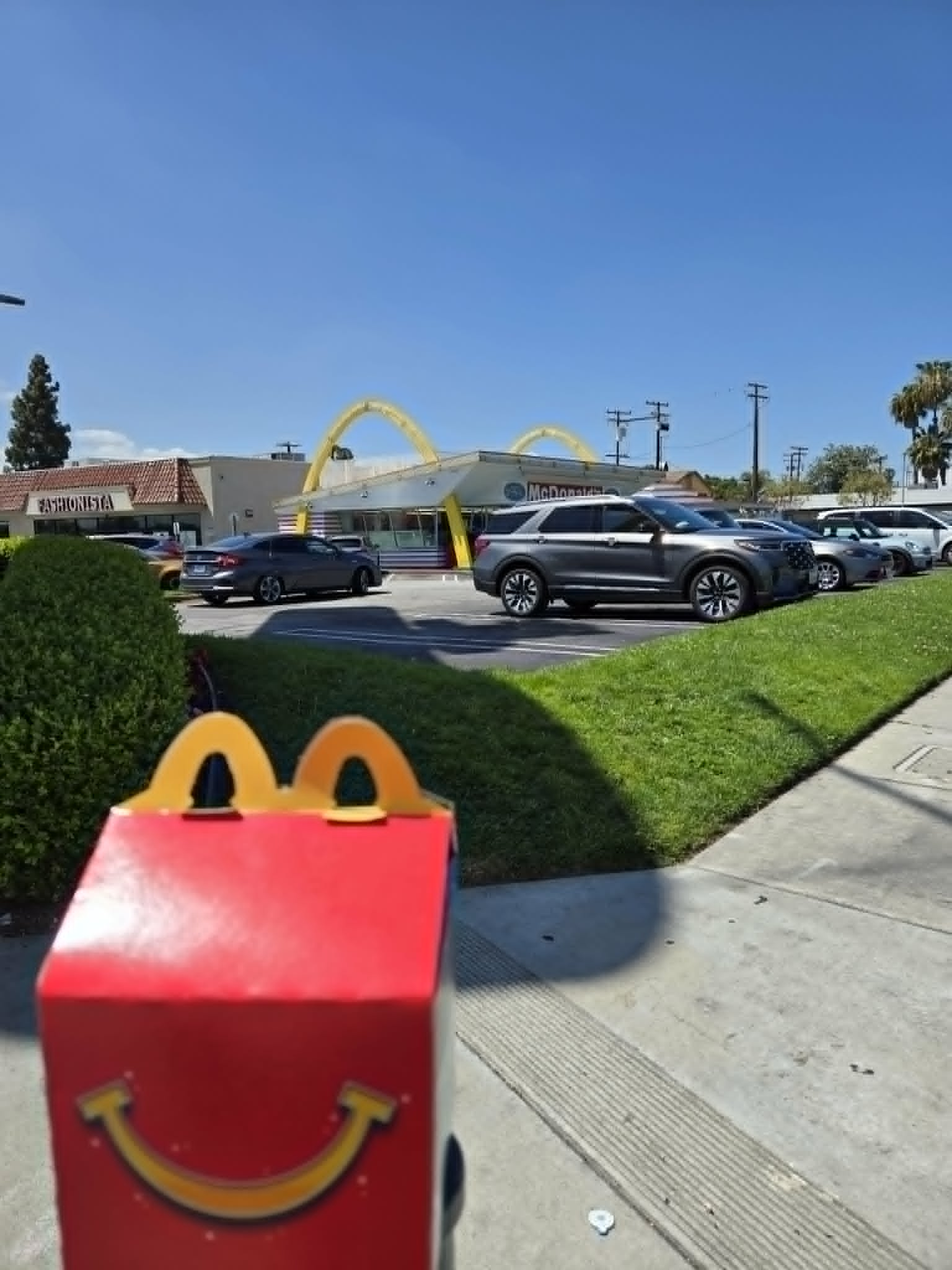
Happy Meal in front of Oldest McDonald's Restaurant in 2026

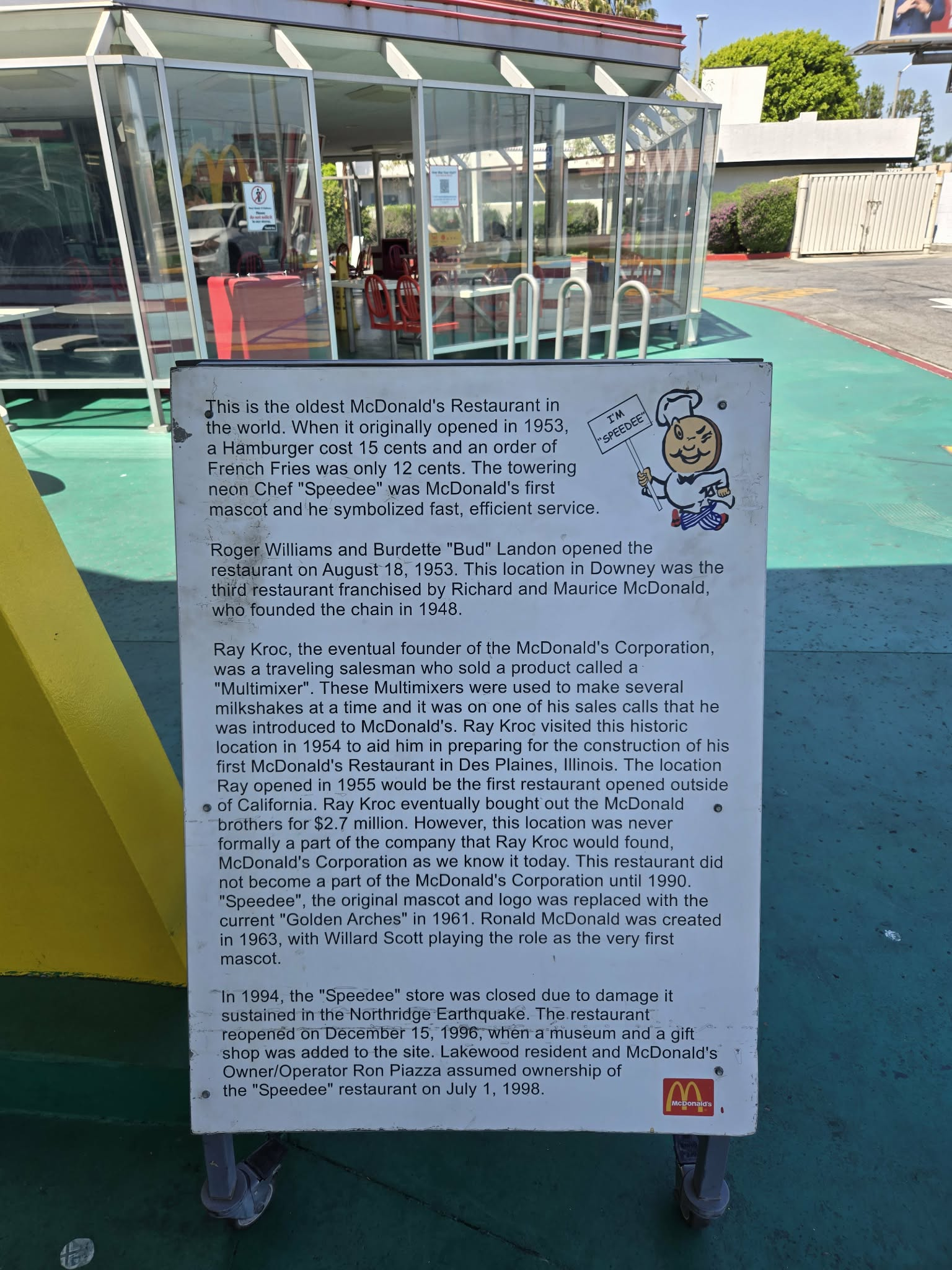
Oldest McDonald's Resurant history information sign with description.

== See also ==
- History of McDonald's
- List of hamburger restaurants
- McDonald's No. 1 Store Museum
