= History of McDonald's =

McDonald's logo since 2018

The American fast-food restaurant chain McDonald's was founded in 1940 by the McDonald brothers, Richard and Maurice, and has since grown to the world's largest restaurant chain by revenue. The McDonald brothers began the business in San Bernardino, California, where the brothers set out to sell their barbecue. However, burgers were more popular with the public and the business model switched to a carhop drive-in style of restaurant. From the 1940s to the mid-1950s, the brothers expanded their business, even incorporating the famous Golden Arches, until Ray Kroc turned their small business into the well-known and commercially successful business it is today. Kroc convinced the brothers to move into a more self-serve business model and to expand nationwide.

Kroc and the McDonald brothers worked together for several years until conflicts over their visions for what McDonald's as a brand should be came to a climax. Kroc asked the McDonald brothers in 1961 how much they would be willing to leave the business for and the brothers agreed to leave for 2.7 million dollars. Harry J. Sonneborn and Kroc worked together until Sonneborn's resignation in 1967. That same year, McDonald's expanded internationally and now has locations in most countries around the globe. McDonald's operates as one of the largest private employers in the world. Its CEO is Christopher J. Kempczinski. Its revenue hits about $26 billion every year.

== The family years of McDonald's ==
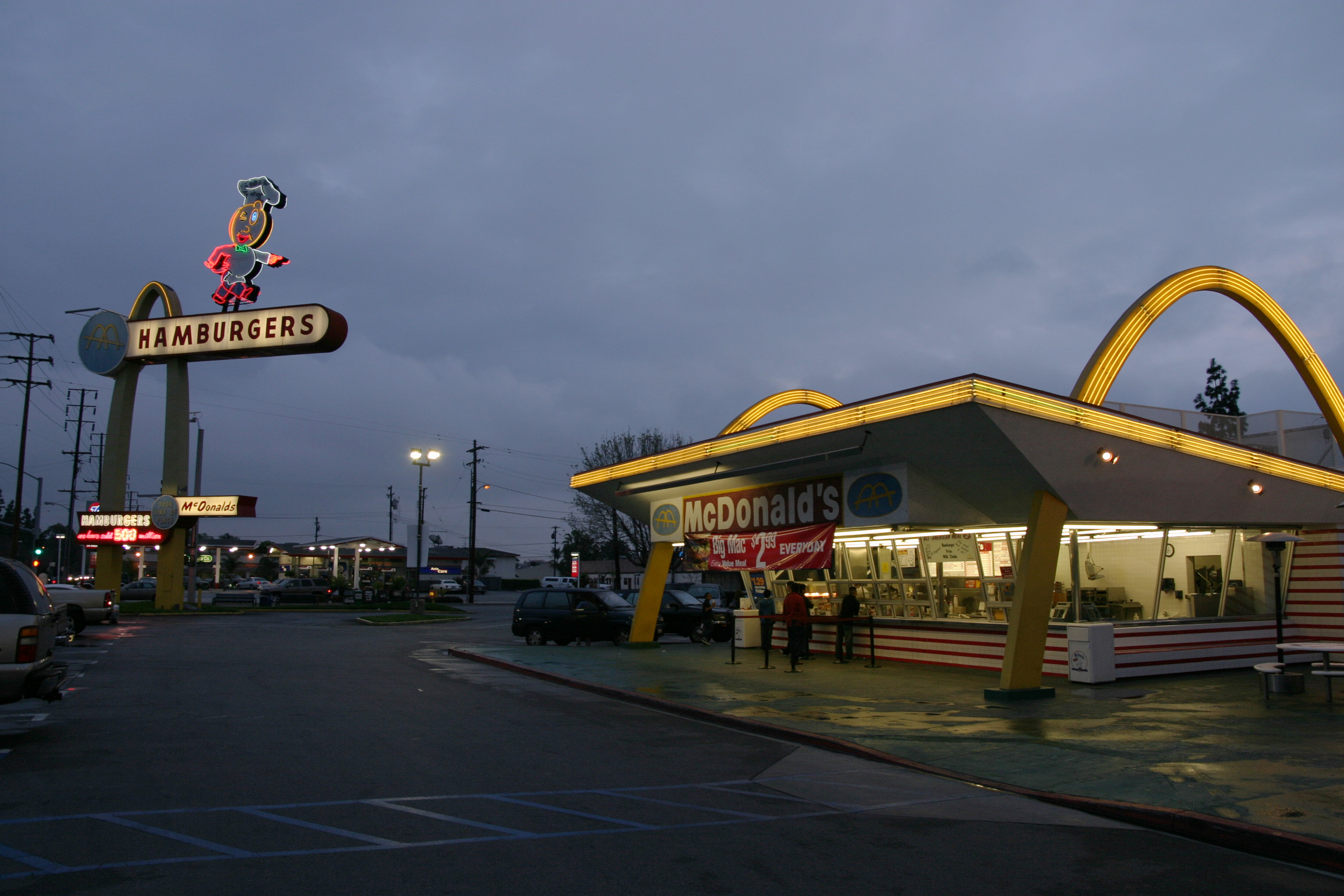
The oldest operating McDonald's, on Lakewood and Florence in Downey, California in March 2007, was the chain's third restaurant and the second to be built with the Golden Arches.

McDonald's was founded in 1940s California by the McDonald brothers. Before opening the first restaurant, members of the McDonald family had operated several businesses together around California. In 1937, an orange juice stand on Route 66, in Monrovia was opened. Sources diverge on whether this was done by the brothers Richard and Maurice McDonald ("Dick" and "Mac")or by their father Patrick, with the brothers entering the business later. In 1940, the McDonalds opened a barbecue stand in San Bernardino.

The McDonald's brothers opened their first McDonald's restaurant on May 15, 1940 in San Bernardino, California. Originally, a carhop drive-in system was used to serve customers. The initial menu items were centered around barbecue and the first name the brothers used for their business was "McDonald's Famous Barbecue." In 1948, the McDonald brothers realized that most of their profits derived from the sale of hamburgers. They shuttered their successful carhop drive-in to establish a streamlined system with a simple menu that consisted of only hamburgers, cheeseburgers, potato chips, coffee, ice cream, soft drinks, and apple pie.

In April 1952, the brothers decided that they needed an entirely new building to achieve two goals: further efficiency improvements and a more eye-catching appearance. They collected recommendations for an architect and interviewed at least four, choosing Stanley Clark Meston, who practiced in nearby Fontana. The brothers and Meston worked together closely in the design of the new building. They achieved the extra efficiencies that they needed by, among other things, drawing the actual measurements of every piece of equipment in chalk on a tennis court behind the McDonald house (with Meston's assistant, Charles Fish).

The new design achieved a great deal of notice for its gleaming surfaces of red and white ceramic tile, stainless steel, brightly colored sheet metal and glass; pulsing red, white, yellow and green neon; and two 25-foot yellow sheet-metal arches trimmed in neon, which they named the "Golden Arches" at the design stage. A third, smaller arch sign at the roadside depicted a pudgy character in a chef's hat known as Speedee striding across the top, trimmed in animated neon. The brothers implemented a number of techniques to encourage customers to eat more quickly and not to linger in the restaurant, such as reduced heating in the dining area, fixed and angled seating to place customers directly over their food, distance between seats to reduce socialization and cone-shaped cups, which would force customers to hold their drinks while eating.

In late 1953, with only a rendering of Meston's design in hand, the brothers began seeking franchisees. Their first was Neil Fox, a distributor for General Petroleum Corporation. Fox's stand, the first with Meston's golden arches design, opened in May 1953 at 4050 North Central Avenue and Indian School Road in Phoenix, Arizona. The cost was a flat fee of $1,000 (equivalent to $12,000 in 2025). His restaurant was the first to employ the McDonald brothers' Golden Arches standardized design, created by Southern California architect Stanley Clark Meston and his assistant Charles Fish. Fox's use of the "McDonald's" name came as a surprise to the brothers. One of their franchisees (Charles Cox in North Hollywood, CA) would use the name "Peaks" from 1953 until 1965, but all others would be "McDonald's".

Their second franchisee was the team of Fox's brother-in-law Roger Williams and Burdette "Bud" Landon, both of whom also worked for General Petroleum. Williams and Landon opened their stand on August 18, 1953 at 10207 Lakewood Boulevard in Downey, California. The Downey stand is the oldest surviving McDonald's restaurant.

== Ray Kroc enters ==
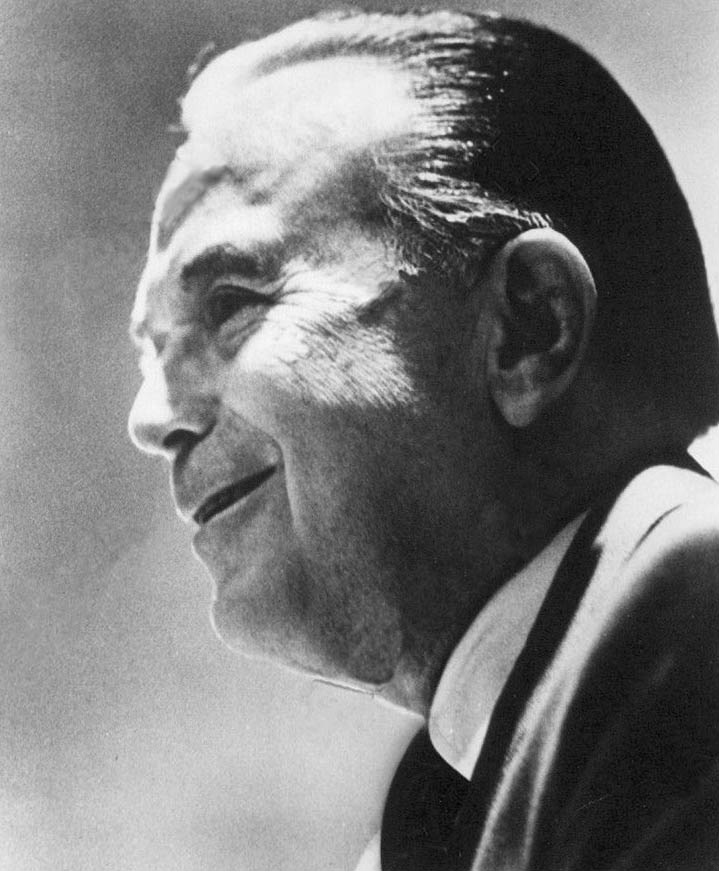
Ray Kroc joined the chain in 1954 and built it into an eventually global franchise, making it the most successful fast-food corporation in the world.

In 1954, Ray Kroc, a seller of Prince Castle brand Multimixer milkshake machines, learned that the McDonald brothers were using eight of his machines at their San Bernardino restaurant. His curiosity was piqued, and he flew to California to visit the restaurant himself. The McDonald brothers operated six franchise locations.

Believing that the McDonald's formula was a ticket to success, Kroc suggested that the brothers franchise their restaurants throughout the United States. The brothers were skeptical that the self-service approach could succeed in colder, rainier climates; furthermore, their thriving business in San Bernardino, and franchises already operating or planned, made them reluctant to risk a national venture. Kroc offered to assume the major responsibility for establishing the new franchises elsewhere. He returned to his home outside of Chicago with rights to set up McDonald's restaurants throughout the country, except in a handful of territories in California and Arizona already licensed by the McDonald brothers. The brothers were to receive 0.5% of gross sales.

=== Sonneborn model and shift to real-estate holdings ===
In 1956, Ray Kroc met Harry J. Sonneborn, a former vice president of finance for Tastee-Freez, who offered an idea to accelerate the growth and investment grade of Kroc's planned McDonald's operation: to own the real estate upon which future franchises would be built. Kroc hired Sonneborn and his plan was executed by forming a separate company, Franchise Realty Corp, to hold McDonald's real estate. The new company signed leases and procured mortgages for both land and buildings, passing these costs on to the franchisee with a 20-40% markup and a reduced initial deposit of $950. The "Sonneborn model" of real-estate ownership within the franchise persists to this day, and may be the most important financial decision in the company's history. McDonald's present-day real-estate holdings represent $37.7 billion on its balance sheet, about 99% of the company's assets and 35% of its annual gross revenue.

== 1960s ==
The first television commercial to feature the Ronald McDonald character, from 1963 portrayed by Willard Scott

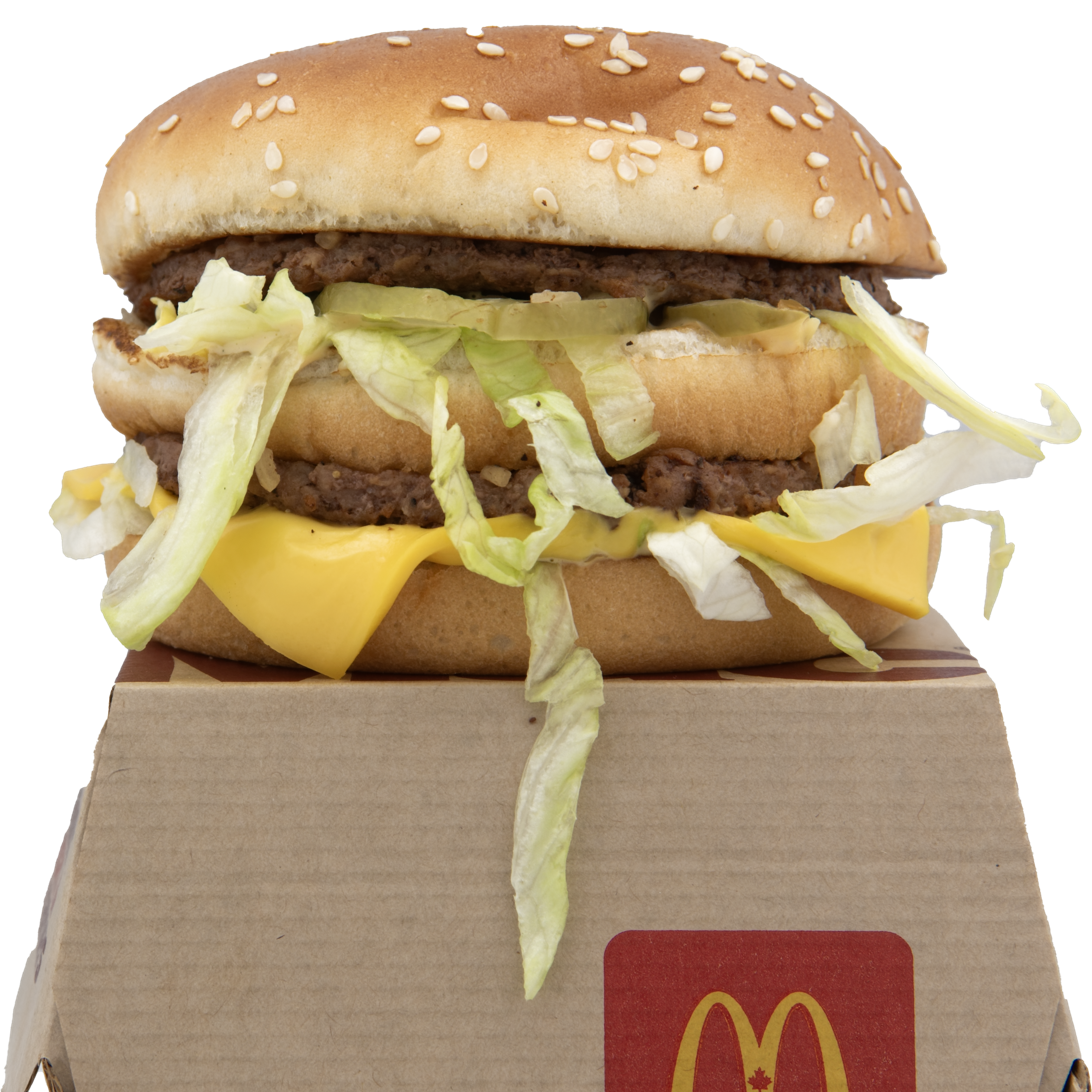
The Big Mac hamburger made its debut in 1968.

By 1960, McDonald's restaurants were grossing $56 million annually. The growth in U.S. automobile use that came with suburbanization and the interstate highway system contributed heavily to McDonald's success. In 1961, Kroc's conflict over the vision of the company with the founding brothers had escalated, and he asked them how much money they wanted to leave their business to him entirely. The brothers asked for $2.7 million ($23.4 million in 2021 dollars), which Kroc did not have. Harry J. Sonneborn was able to raise the money for him, and Kroc bought the founding brothers' interests in the company. This purchase laid the groundwork for positioning the company for an IPO and making McDonald's the top fast-food chain in the country. The exact process by which the company was sold is not known; it is depicted as a hostile takeover by Kroc in the 2016 biographical film The Founder, but that portrayal has been disputed, and interviews from the time suggest a more voluntary transition.

Kroc and Sonneborn disagreed over expansion of the company, leading to Sonneborn's resignation in 1967. Kroc took over the title of CEO and president. That same year, McDonald's opened its first location outside of the United States in Richmond, Canada.

In 1968, a man named Herman Petty was the first African American to franchise a McDonald's. This came off the heels of the civil rights movement and was informally recognized as African American's initial business entry into McDonald's as a cooperation.

McDonald's success in the 1960s was largely the result of the company's skillful marketing and flexible response to customer demand. In 1962, the Filet-O-Fish sandwich, billed as "the fish that catches people," was introduced. In 1967, the Big Mac was created by Jim Delligatti, whose franchised McDonald's was in Uniontown, Pennsylvania, and was added to McDonald's national menu the next year.

== 1970s ==
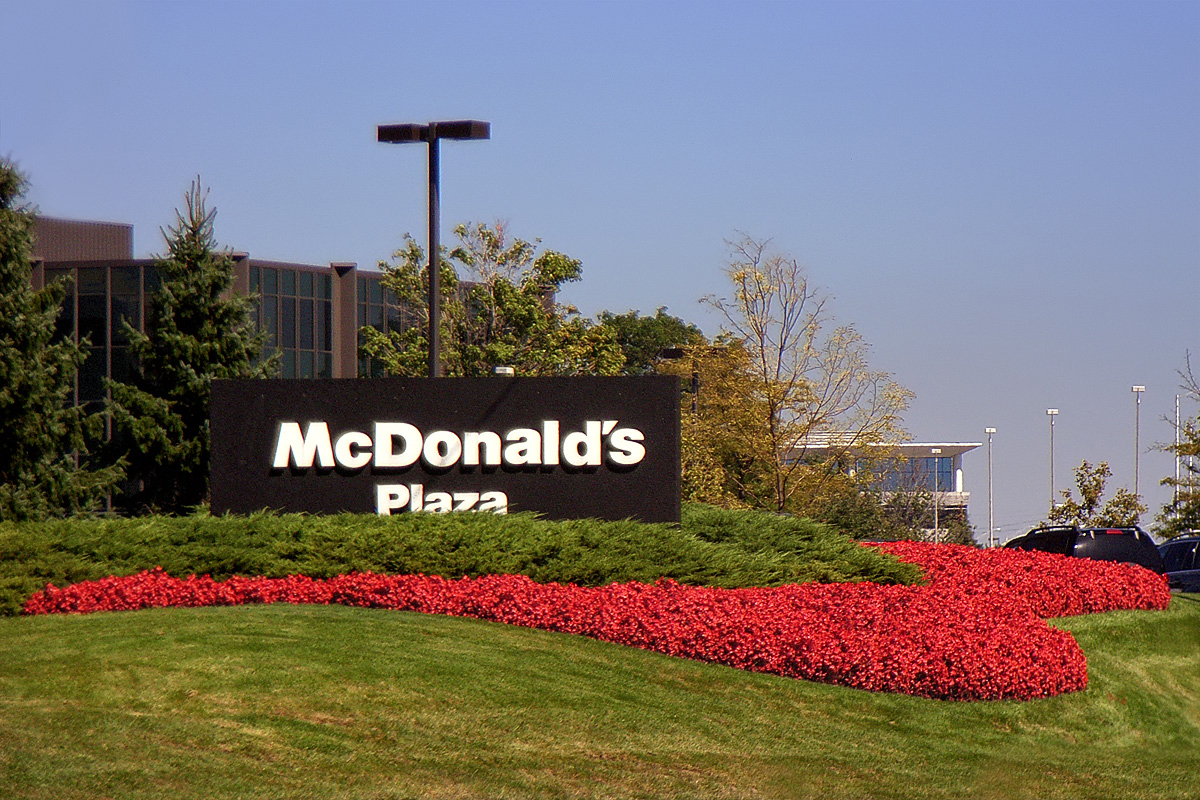
McDonald's Plaza in Oak Brook, Illinois, home to company headquarters from 1971 to 2018

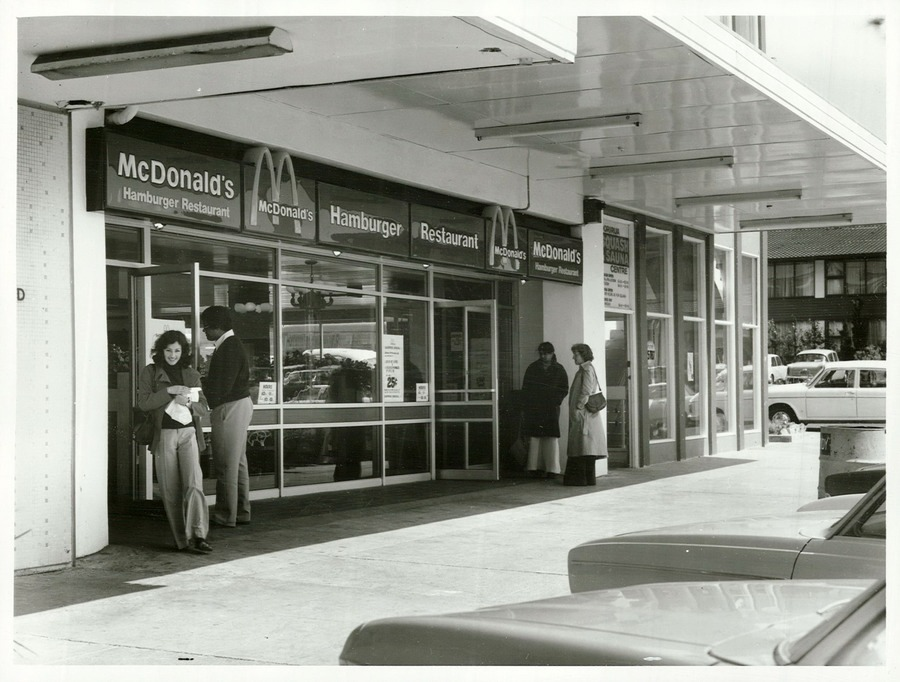
New Zealand's first McDonald's restaurant, in Porirua in September 1976

In 1970, the first restaurant outside of Northern America opened in San José, Costa Rica. In 1971, McDonald's opened its first European restaurant in Zaandam, Netherlands through a joint venture with supermarket chain Albert Heijn called Family Food N.V. The first restaurant in Asia opened in Tokyo, Japan in July 1971, and in December that year, the first German restaurant, which was then in West Germany, opened in Munich–Obergiesing. The first restaurant in Oceania opened in 1971 in Yagoona, Australia.

In 1972, the National Black McDonald's Operators Association (NBMOA) was founded. Herman Petty, the first African American to franchise a McDonald's, helped establish the association and it soon became a representation of Black people's voices inside of the company.

There was some skepticism about the company's phenomenal growth internationally. When Wally and Hugh Morris approached the corporation in 1974 to bring McDonald's into New Zealand, they were firmly shunned by Kroc who, citing a visit to the country, stated, "There aren't any people... I never met a more dead-than-alive hole in my life." The Morris brothers were finally granted a franchise in May 1975. They negotiated a deal with the corporation by selling New Zealand cheese to the U.S. to offset the high costs of importing plant equipment. The first New Zealand restaurant opened in June 1976 in Porirua, near Wellington, to much more success than the corporation had predicted. By this time McDonald's had also expanded into many more territories including France, Sweden, the United Kingdom and Hong Kong (then a British colony. By 1976, there were over 3,600 McDonald's restaurants in the U.S. and Canada.

In 1979, the first McDonald's restaurant in Southeast Asia opened at Liat Towers in Orchard Road, Singapore. That same year also saw the opening of the first restaurant in South America, in Rio De Janeiro, Brazil.

== 1980s ==
The first McDonald's outlet in Malaysia opened at Jalan Bukit Bintang on April 29, 1982.

On July 18, 1984, there was a mass shooting at a McDonald's restaurant in San Ysidro, California. The shooter killed 22 people and injured another 19 and the shooting itself ended when a SWAT sniper hit the shooter in the heart. After the shooting, the restaurant was cleaned up and refurbished in two days. However, due to community pressure, the restaurant was permanently closed and demolished with a memorial to the 22 slain was put on the property. McDonald's would later build a new restaurant two blocks from the site of the massacre.

On October 29, 1985, Saul Kahan, first Joint Venture Partner opened the first McDonald's restaurant in Mexico in Pedregal, Mexico City.

In 1984, the company ran a promotion for the 1984 Olympics saying "When the U.S. wins, you win," promising free food items for each medal the U.S. got. However, the Soviets organized a boycott and with minimal competition, the US dominated, winning 174 medals. Over 6,000 locations faced shortages, and the corporation has never admitted to how much money they lost, though it is estimated to be in the millions.

In 1988, McDonald's Japan introduced prepaid cards at three of its outlets in Tokyo. Intended to make payments faster, it offered cards in 1,000, 3,000 and 5,000 yen denominations.

== 1990s ==
The first McDonald's Express locations opened in 1991. These are smaller-scale prototypes, usually constructed in prefabricated buildings or urban storefronts, that do not feature certain menu items such as milkshakes and Quarter Pounders.

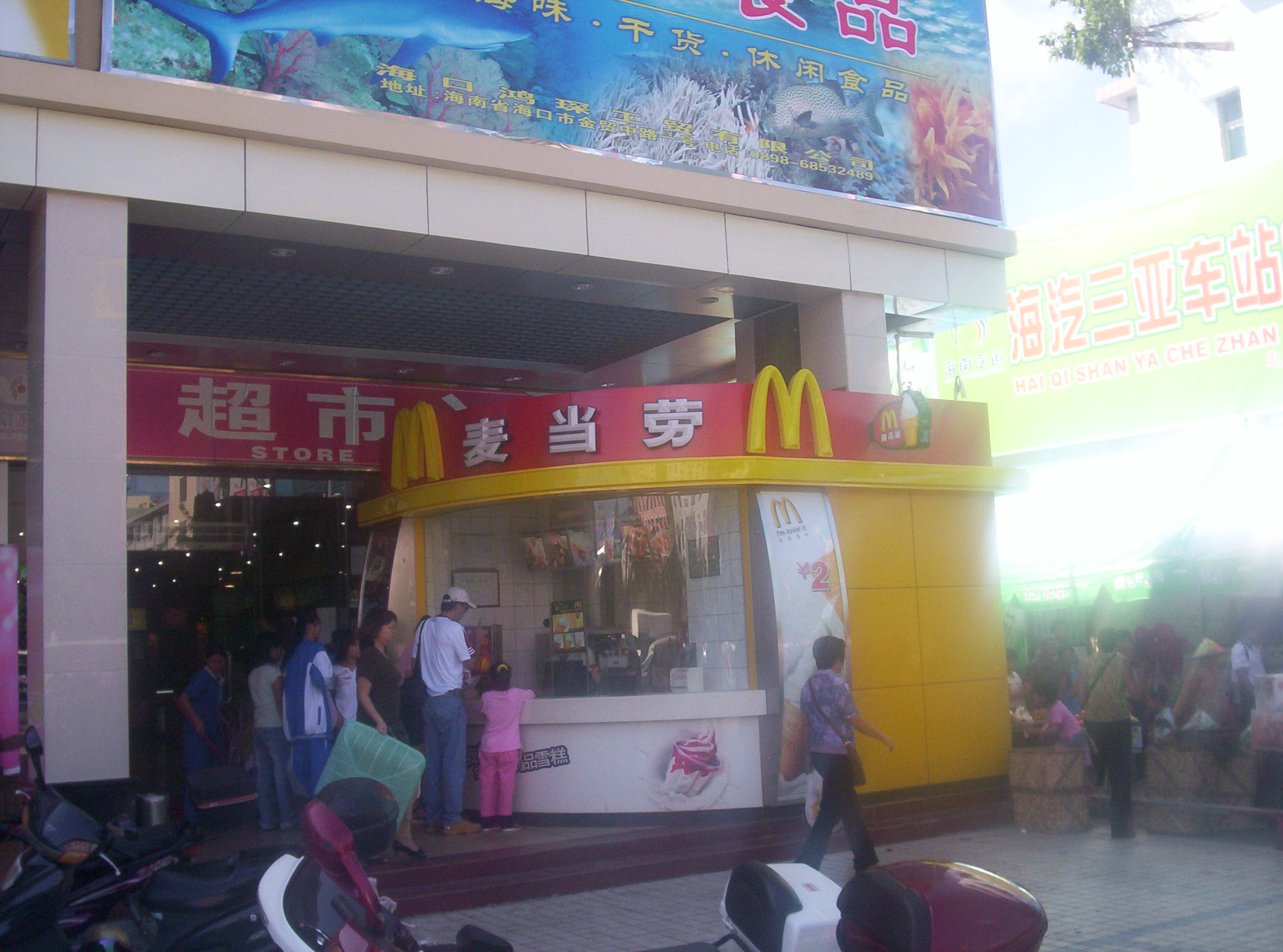
A McDonald's soft drink/ice cream stand in Sanya, Hainan, China in December 2005

The first McDonald's in Mainland China opened in Dongmen, Shenzhen in October 1990.

The Extra Value Meal, a burger, fries and drink combination deal, was introduced from 1993, originally as part of a Jurassic Park tie-in.

On April 28 and 29, 1992, the Taiwan McDonald's bombings occurred when bombs were planted in or near various McDonald's restaurants in Taiwan as part of an extortion attempt, causing the death of a policeman and injuries to four civilians, including two young children, and the temporary closure of all 57 McDonald's locations in that country.

A week later on May 7, Sydney River McDonald's murders took place in Sydney River, Nova Scotia, Canada when a botched robbery committed by employee Derek Wood and two accomplices resulted in the murder of three employees, and the permanent disablement of a fourth employee shot in the head.

On October 12, 1992, Mark Hopkins was electrocuted at McDonald's Manchester Arndale store.

McDonald's Japan's 1,000th outlet opened in September 1993. It plans to boost sales by opening a novelty shop selling T-shirts and cotton kimonos emblazoned with golden arches and McDonald's characters and release a video game featuring Ronald McDonald with Sega Enterprises, Ltd.

McDonald's expanded in the Middle East in 1993-1994, opening its first stores in Israel and Saudi Arabia followed by Kuwait, Oman, Egypt, Bahrain and the United Arab Emirates. In 1995, the first kosher McDonald's restaurant opened in Israel.

In 1995, the McFlurry was first created by Canadian McDonald's franchise owner, Ron McLellan in Bathurst, New Brunswick.

In 1997, the first McDonald's outlet in Bolivia was opened in Santa Cruz de la Sierra. In November 2002, McDonald's closed all its locations in that country, due to cultural rejection from citizens and the government, but especially due to losses from franchisee Arcos Dorados, enabling its exit from the Bolivian market effective November 30, 2002, making Bolivia and Cuba the only Latin American countries without McDonald's. Shortly after its closure, rival chain Burger King acquired its locations.

McDonald's offered pizza options in the 1990s.

== 2000s ==
Logo used from 2003 to 2006/2007

More than 11,000 McDonald's locations were opened outside the United States after the conclusion of the 1990s. In 2000, a McDonald's in Dearborn, Michigan in Greater Detroit was the first one in Michigan and the only one east of the Mississippi River to offer halal food for Muslim customers.

== 2010s ==
In January 2012, the company announced that revenue for 2011 reached an all-time high of $27 billion, and that 2,400 restaurants would be updated and 1,300 new ones opened worldwide.

In the middle of the decade, the restaurant began to suffer from declining profits. In response, McDonald's began to offer a limited selection of its breakfast menu all day starting in 2015. At first, the launch was unpopular with franchisees who claimed that the changes caused service to slow down. However, the plan paid off with CNBC reporting that the company's fourth quarter earnings "easily topped analysts' forecasts".

On July 22, 2016, the 2016 Munich shooting took place when David Sonboly, an 18-year-old German-Iranian man, opened fire at a McDonald's restaurant known to be frequented by immigrants, before shooting at bystanders in the street outside and then in Olympia shopping mall, and then killing himself. Nine people were killed, and 16 more injured.

== 2020s ==
On March 8, 2022, McDonald's suspended operations at all 850 of its locations in Russia, in response to the Russian invasion of Ukraine twelve days prior. The move comes after similar decisions by other Western companies and pressure from critics. The brand relaunched on June 12, 2022 as 'Vkusno & tochka' (Вкусно и точка, Tasty and that's it) by local franchisee Alexander Govor.

In July 2022, McDonald's bought its Florida franchisee Caspers Company.
