= Jürgen Knauss =

German businessman, marketer and photographer (1938–2024)

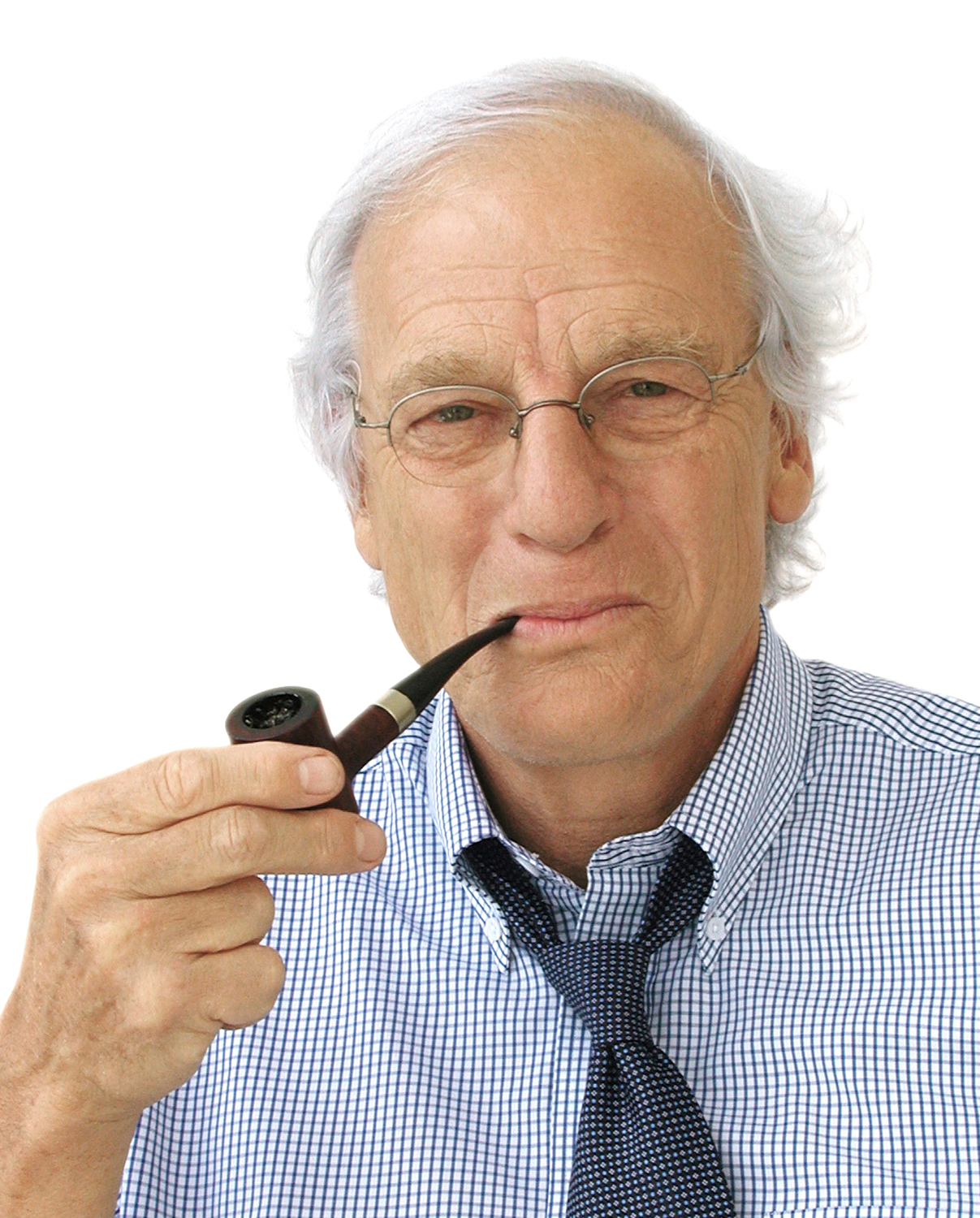
- Knauss in 2008
- Born: 14 March 1938; Darmstadt, Gau Hesse-Nassau, Germany
- Died: 18 October 2024 (aged 86)
- Other name: Yussof Knauss
- Occupations: Entrepreneur, Marketer and Photographer
- Known for: McDonald's slogan i'm lovin' it

Jürgen Knauss (14 March 1938 – 18 October 2024) was a German entrepreneur, marketer and photographer.

== Background ==
Knauss was born in Darmstadt on 14 March 1938. He became a trained typesetter and studied graphics.

Knauss was married to the publisher Claudia Knauss. He died on 18 October 2024, at the age of 86.

== Career ==
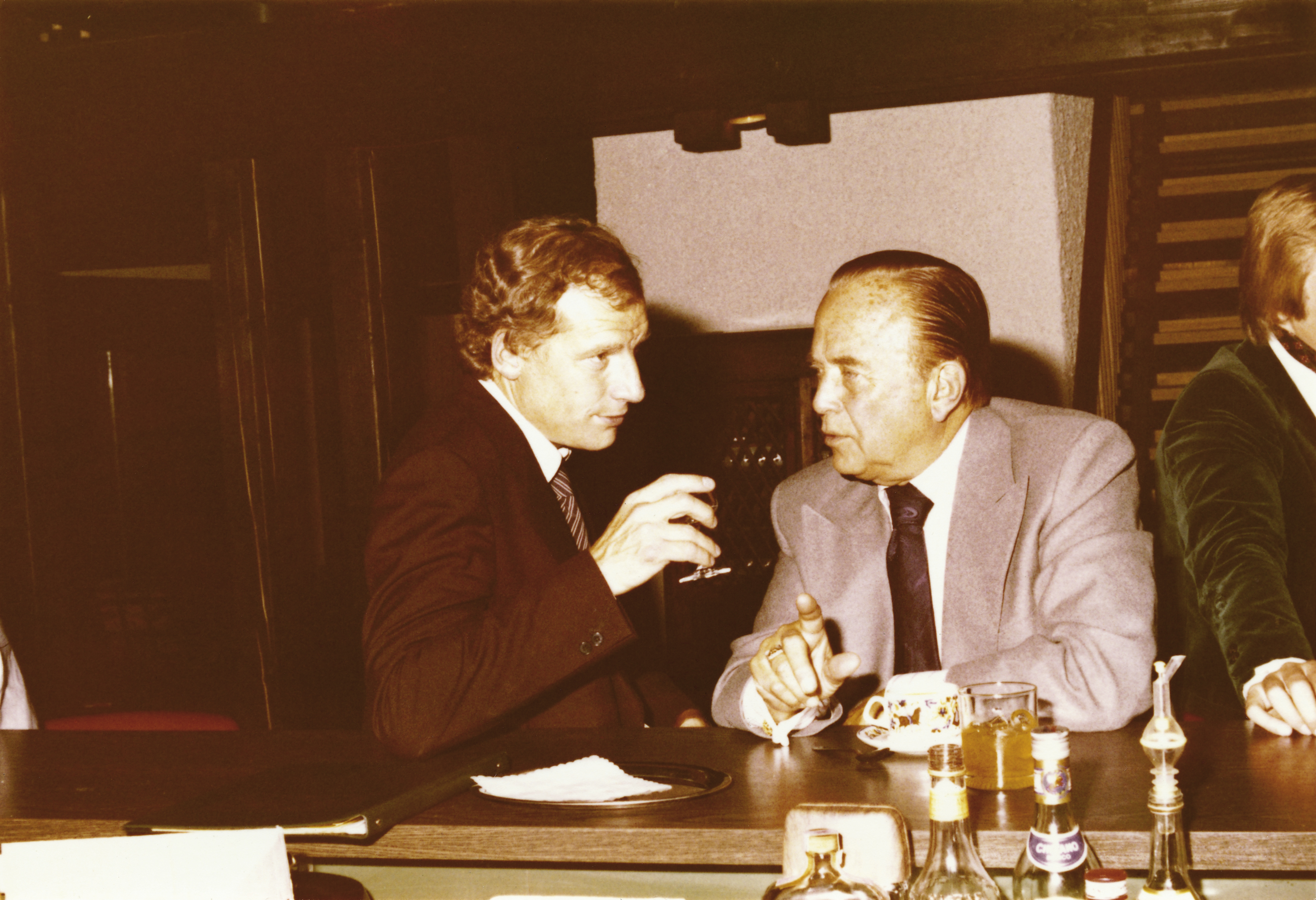
Ray Kroc and Jürgen Knauss

At the beginning of his career, Knauss worked for a printing company in Brazil. After he met Friedrich W. Heye in 1964, he started working as a layout consultant for Heye Verlag. In 1971, Knauss met the founder of McDonald's Ray Kroc in Munich, which led to a 40 year long marketing partnership. Knauss became managing director of the advertising agency Heye & Partner in 1974. In 1984, he was appointed board member of Needham Worldwide (today DDB). After F.W. Heyes death in 1988, Knauss and his wife Claudia took over Heye Verlag in 1989.

In 2003, Knauss and his agency developed the McDonald's slogan i'm lovin' it (German Ich liebe es), which won a worldwide competition between 14 agencies; he is best known as the inventor of this slogan.

He resigned as CEO of the company in 2007 and served as chairman until 2014.

In 2014, Knauss founded the publishing house +Knauss Verlag with his wife Claudia; he appears in the publications as Yussof Knauss. In 2015 they opened the workspace +Knauss Werkraum in Munich. A part of his photographic work is shown in exhibitions.

== Awards ==
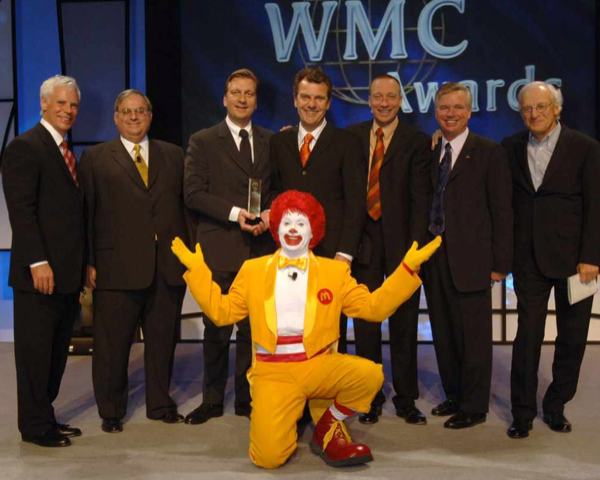
McDonalds Excellence Award 2005

- 1994: Man of the Year from Deutsche Werbeindustrie
- 2005: Hamburger Food Service Award
- 2007: Charlie Bell Award from McDonald's,
- 2016: Deutscher Fotobuchpreis Bronze (German photobook prize), for his photography book Burma/Myanmar – Im Fluss der Langsamkeit .
- 2018: Deutscher Fotobuchpreis Bronze (German photobook prize), for his photography book S.T.I.L.L.E.

== Publications ==
- C. Knauss, J. Knauss, F. W. Heye, H. Valinue, H. Marceau: Mordillo Jubiläumsbuch, 1997. ISBN 978-3895297137
- J. Knauss, Sueddeutsche Zeitung, Münchner Literaturhaus: München inspiriert, Heye & Partner 2008.
- Jürgen Knauss, Jan Knauss: Deutsche See: FAMILY OF FISCH, +KNAUSS München, Hamburg 2011. ISBN 978-3-8401-1758-9
- J. Knauss: Das Viertel (Glockenbachviertel, Isarvorstadt, Gärtnerplatzviertel München), German, Heye & Partner, 2013.
- C. Knauss, J. Knauss: Burma /Myanmar: Im Fluss der Langsamkeit, German, +KNAUSS Verlag, November 2014. ISBN 978-3000469572
- C. Knauss, J. Knauss, et al.: S.T.I.L.L.E.: Ein Buch, das fotografisch, literarisch und musikalisch zum Flanieren durch das Universum der Stille einlädt, German, +KNAUSS Verlag, October 2017. ISBN 978-3000566394
- Jürgen Knauss, Jan Knauss, M. Lange: 24 Stunden BayArena 04, +KNAUSS Werkraum, München 2017.

== See also ==
- McDonald's
- McDonald's advertising
- I'm Lovin' It (song)
- Ray Kroc
- Heye Verlag (German Wikipedia)
