= Ray Kroc =

American businessman (1902–1984)

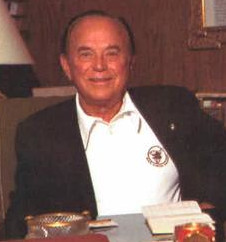
- Kroc in 1978
- Born: Raymond Albert Kroc; October 5, 1902; Oak Park, Illinois, U.S.
- Died: January 14, 1984 (aged 81); San Diego, California, U.S.
- Resting place: El Camino Memorial Park
- Occupation: Businessman
- Spouses: Ethel Fleming (m. 1922; div. 1961) Jane Dobbins Green (m. 1963; div. 1968) Joan Smith (m. 1969)
- Children: 1

Raymond Albert Kroc (October 5, 1902 – January 14, 1984) was an American businessman who was instrumental in turning McDonald's into the most successful global fast food corporation by revenue. He purchased the brand from the McDonald brothers in 1961, after several years as their franchising agent, and served as the leader of the company until his death.

Kroc was born in Oak Park, Illinois, and worked a variety of jobs, including as a paper cup salesman and a musician, before eventually becoming a milkshake mixer salesman. In 1954, he visited a hamburger restaurant in San Bernardino, California, owned by Richard and Maurice McDonald. Kroc was impressed with the efficiency and speed of the restaurant's operations, and he convinced the brothers to allow him to franchise the concept.

Under Kroc's leadership, McDonald's grew rapidly due to Kroc's focus on aggressive expansion, opening new restaurants across the United States and eventually internationally. Kroc became the owner of McDonald's Corporation in 1961 and is credited as its founder, due to his influence as a franchise agent and principal role in the company's expansion, despite not having founded the company.

Kroc served as president of McDonald's from 1955 to 1968, as chairman of the board from 1968 to 1977, and as senior chairman from 1977 until his death in 1984. During his lifetime Kroc was an active supporter of numerous charitable organizations. He owned the San Diego Padres of Major League Baseball from 1974 until his death.

== Early life and education ==
Raymond Albert Kroc was born on October 5, 1902, in Oak Park, Illinois, near Chicago, to Czech-American parents, Rose Mary (née Hrach) and Alois "Louis" Kroc. Alois was born in Horní Stupno, part of Břasy near Rokycany. Rose's father Vojtěch was from Ševětín and her maternal grandfather Josef Kotilínek was from Bořice. After emigrating to America, Alois made a fortune speculating on land during the 1920s, only to lose everything with the stock market crash in 1929.

At the age of 15, Kroc made the decision to leave high school, contrary to his parents' wishes. Following the United States' entry into World War I in 1917, he lied about his age in order to enlist with the American Red Cross as an ambulance driver. However, his service was short-lived, as the war concluded shortly after his enlistment. During the 1920s and throughout the Great Depression, Kroc worked a variety of jobs, including a paper-cup salesman, a real estate agent, and a pianist in multiple bands.

== McDonald's ==
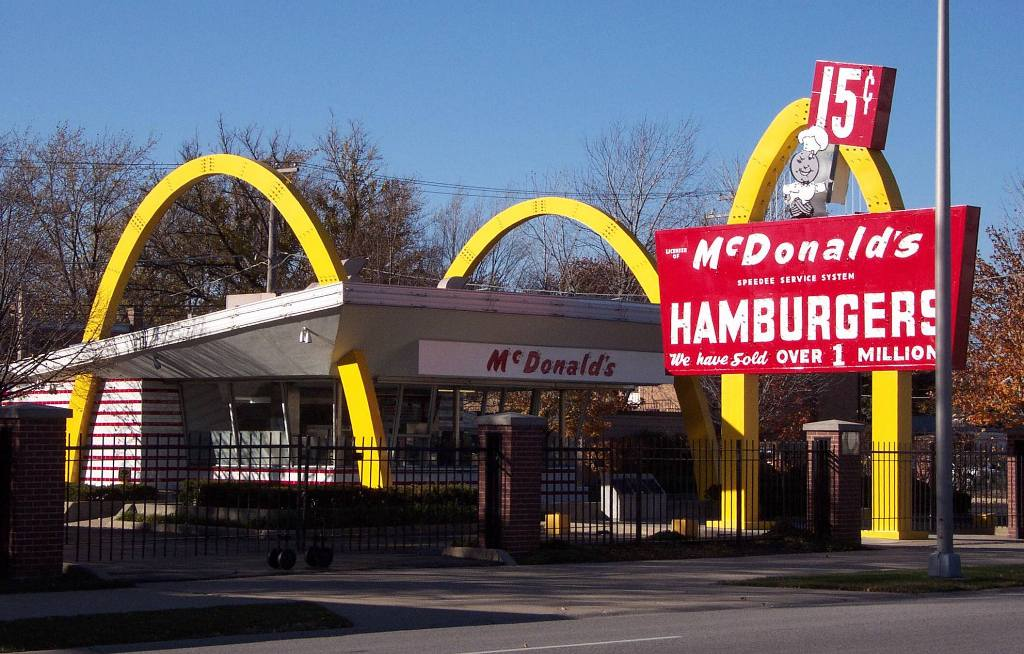
Ray Kroc's first (McDonald's ninth) restaurant, which opened April 1955 in Des Plaines, Illinois

After World War II, Kroc found employment as a milkshake mixer salesman for the foodservice equipment manufacturer Prince Castle. When Prince Castle mixers sales plummeted because of competition from lower-priced Hamilton Beach products, Kroc was intrigued by Richard and Maurice McDonald, who had purchased eight of his mixers for their restaurant in San Bernardino, California. Kroc visited the brothers in 1954 to see why they were making so many milkshakes.

After finalizing a franchise agreement with the McDonald brothers, Kroc sent a letter to Walt Disney. They had met as ambulance attendant trainees in Old Greenwich, Connecticut, during World War I. Kroc wrote, "I have very recently taken over the national franchise of the McDonald's system. I would like to inquire if there may be an opportunity for a McDonald's in your Disney Development." According to one account, Disney agreed but with a stipulation to increase the price of fries from ten cents to fifteen cents, allowing himself the profit. Kroc refused to gouge his loyal customers, leaving Disneyland to open without a McDonald's restaurant. Writer Eric Schlosser, writing in his book Fast Food Nation, believes that this is a doctored retelling of the transaction by some McDonald's marketing executives. The proposal was likely returned without approval.

Kroc has been credited with making a number of innovative changes in the food-service franchise model. Chief among them was the sale of only single-store franchises instead of selling larger, territorial franchises which was common in the industry at the time. Kroc recognized that the sale of exclusive licenses for large markets was the quickest way for a franchisor to make money, but he also saw in the practice a loss in the franchisor's ability to exert control over the course and direction of a chain's development. Above all else, and in keeping with contractual obligations with the McDonald brothers, Kroc wanted uniformity in service and quality among all of the McDonald's locations. Without the ability to influence franchisees, Kroc knew that it would be difficult to achieve that goal. By granting a franchisee the right to only one store location at a time, Kroc retained for the franchise some measure of control over the franchisee, or at least those desiring to someday own the rights to another store.

Kroc became frustrated with the McDonald brothers' desire to maintain a small number of restaurants. The brothers also consistently told Kroc he could not make changes to things such as the original blueprint, but despite Kroc's pleas, the brothers never sent any formal letters that legally allowed the changes in the chain. In 1961, he bought the company for $2.7 million, the figure that the brothers gave him when pressed for an amount. Kroc went "ballistic" over hearing the amount and asked if he could pay it incrementally, but the brothers refused. Obtaining the funds for the buyout was difficult due to existing debt from expansion. However, Harry Sonneborn, whom Kroc referred to as his "financial wizard", was able to raise the required funds.

At the closing, Kroc became annoyed that the brothers would not transfer to him the real estate and rights to the original San Bernardino location. The brothers had told Kroc they were giving the operation, property and all, to the founding employees. In his anger, Kroc later opened a new McDonald's restaurant near the original McDonald's, which had been renamed the Big M because the brothers had neglected to retain rights to the name. Kroc felt that no one would want to eat at a restaurant chain called "Kroc's" and therefore was adamant about obtaining the rights to "McDonald's".

After Kroc opened the nearby McDonald's, the Big M eventually closed. It is alleged that as part of the buyout Kroc promised, based on a handshake agreement, to continue the annual 1% royalty of the original agreement, but there is no evidence of this beyond a claim by a nephew of the McDonald brothers. Neither of the brothers publicly expressed disappointment over the deal. Speaking to someone about the buyout, Richard McDonald reportedly said that he had no regrets.

Kroc maintained the assembly line "Speedee Service System" for hamburger preparation that was introduced by the McDonald brothers in 1948. He standardized operations, ensuring every burger would taste the same in every restaurant. He set strict rules for franchisees on how the food was to be made, portion sizes, cooking methods and times, and packaging. Kroc also rejected cost-cutting measures like using soybean filler in the hamburger patties. These strict rules also were applied to customer service standards with such mandates that money be refunded to clients whose orders were not correct or to customers who had to wait more than five minutes for their food.

By the time of Kroc's death in 1984, McDonald's had 7,500 outlets in the United States and in 31 other countries and territories. The total system-wide sales of its restaurants were more than $8 billion in 1983, and his personal fortune amounted around $600 million.

== Baseball ==
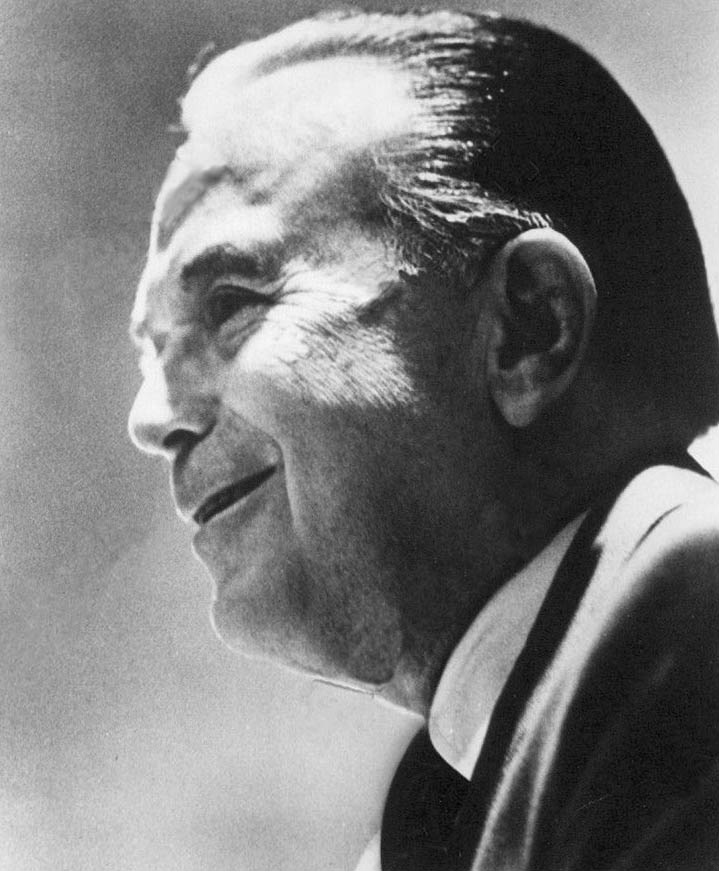
Kroc in 1976, while he owned the baseball team San Diego Padres

Kroc retired from running McDonald's in 1973. While he was looking for new challenges, he decided to return to baseball, which was his lifelong favorite sport. One day, while sitting in his yacht in Fort Lauderdale, Florida, he read in the newspaper that the San Diego Padres were for sale. The team had been conditionally sold to Joseph Danzansky, a Washington, D.C. grocery-chain owner, who planned to move the Padres to Washington. However, the sale was tied up in lawsuits when Kroc purchased the team for $12 million, keeping the team in San Diego. In Kroc's first year of ownership in 1974, the Padres lost 102 games yet drew over one million in attendance, the standard of box office success in the major leagues during that era. Their previous highest attendance figure was 644,772 in 1972. The San Diego Union said Kroc was "above all, a fan of his team".

On April 9, 1974, while the Padres were on the brink of losing a 9–5 decision to the Houston Astros in the season opener at San Diego Stadium, Kroc took the public address microphone in front of 39,083 fans. "I've never seen such stupid ballplaying in my life," he said. The crowd cheered in approval. In 1979, Kroc's public interest in future free agent players Graig Nettles and Joe Morgan drew a $100,000 fine from Commissioner Bowie Kuhn. Frustrated with the team, he handed over operations of the team to his stepson-in-law, Ballard Smith. "There's more future in hamburgers than baseball," Kroc said.

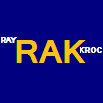
RAK Special Patch

After his death, the Padres in 1984 wore a special patch with Kroc's initials: RAK.

They won the NL pennant that year against his hometown team Chicago Cubs and played in the 1984 World Series, which they lost to the Detroit Tigers. Kroc was inducted posthumously as part of the inaugural class of the San Diego Padres Hall of Fame in 1999.

== Personal life ==
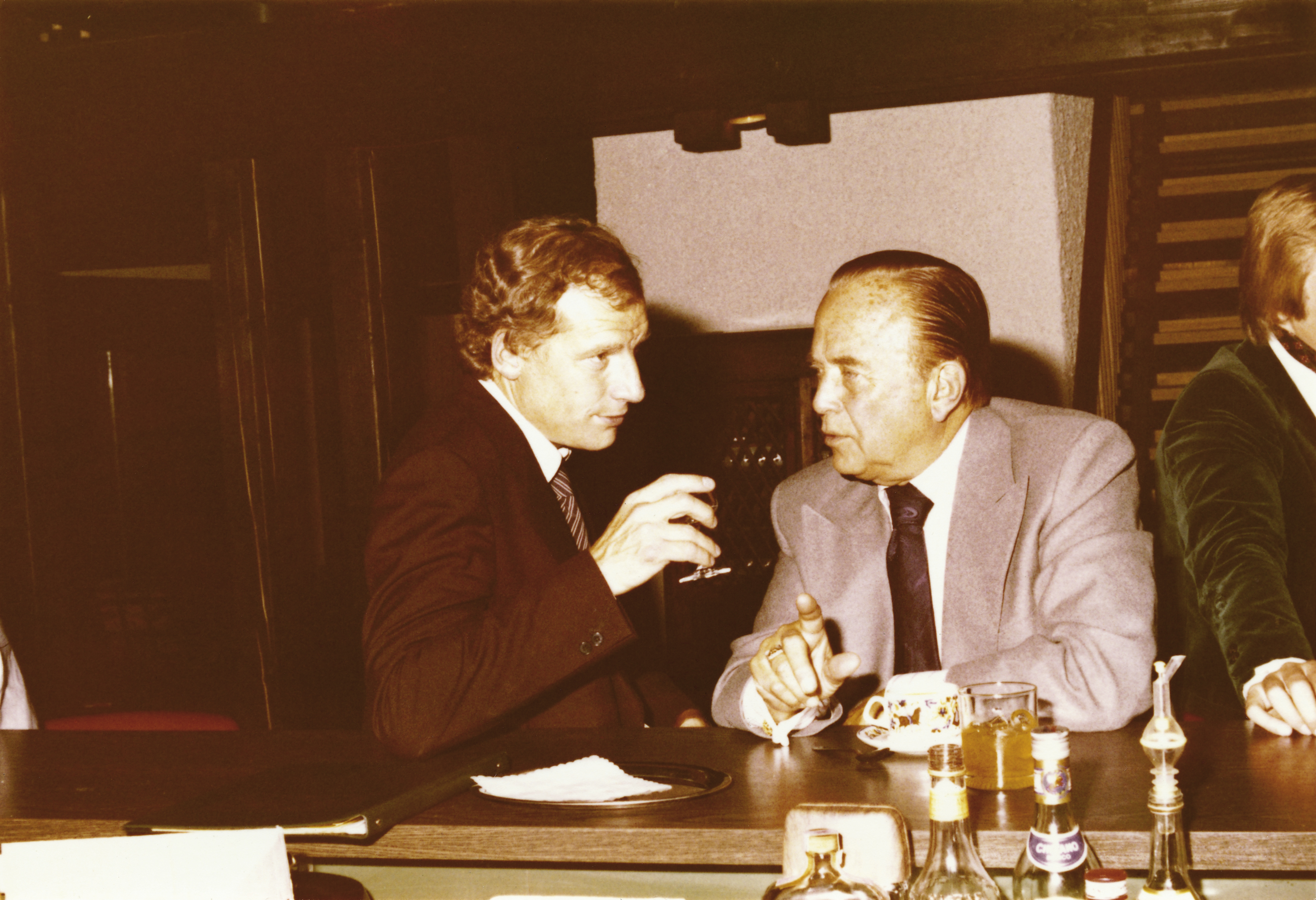
Kroc and Jürgen Knauss

=== Philanthropy and awards ===
The Kroc Foundation supported research, treatment and education about various medical conditions, such as alcoholism, diabetes, arthritis and multiple sclerosis. It is best known for establishing the Ronald McDonald House, a nonprofit organization that provides free housing for parents close to medical facilities where their children are receiving treatment.

In 1973, Kroc received the Golden Plate Award of the American Academy of Achievement.

=== Politics ===
A lifelong Republican, Kroc believed firmly in self-reliance and staunchly opposed government welfare and the New Deal. Kroc donated $255,000 to the Richard Nixon 1972 presidential campaign, and he was controversially accused by some, notably Senator Harrison Williams, of making the donation to influence Nixon to veto a minimum wage bill making its way through Congress.

=== Family ===
Kroc met Ethel Fleming in 1919, married in 1922, and then moved to Chicago, divorcing in 1961. Together, they had Kroc's only child, daughter Marilyn. He married Jane Dobbins Green in 1963, divorcing her in 1968.

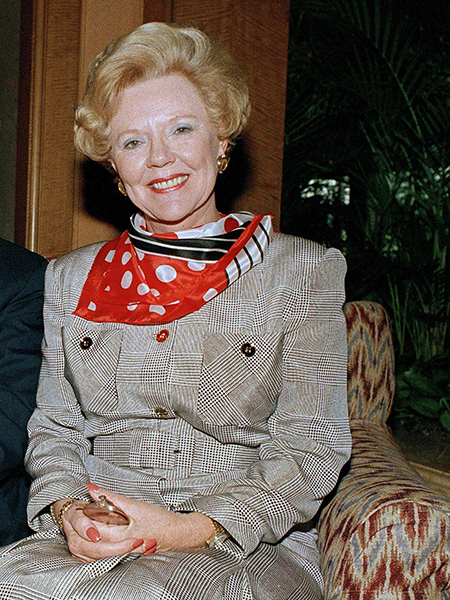
Joan B. Kroc in 1987

He married his third wife, Joan Smith (née Mansfield) in 1969. Joan Kroc was a philanthropist who significantly increased her charitable contributions after Ray Kroc's death. She donated to a variety of causes that interested her, such as the promotion of peace and preventing nuclear proliferation. Upon her death in 2003, her remaining $2.7 billion estate was distributed among a number of nonprofit organizations, including $1.5 billion donation to The Salvation Army to build 26 Kroc Centers, along with a $200 million donation to National Public Radio as she believed deeply in the power of public radio. In addition to that, she also donated to community centers serving socially deprived neighborhoods throughout the country.

=== Health ===
In 1980, following a stroke, Kroc entered an alcohol rehabilitation facility. He died four years later of heart failure at a hospital in San Diego on January 14, 1984, at the age of 81. He was buried at the El Camino Memorial Park in Sorrento Valley, San Diego.

== In popular culture ==
Kroc's acquisition of the McDonald's franchise as well as his "Kroc-style" business tactics are the subject of Mark Knopfler's 2004 song "Boom, Like That".

He co-authored the book Grinding It Out, first published in 1977 and reissued in 2016; it served as the basis for The Founder, a biographical movie about Kroc directed by John Lee Hancock and starring Michael Keaton as Kroc. The film's depiction of Kroc's franchise development, nationwide expansion, and ultimate acquisition of McDonald's offered a critical view of his treatment of the founding McDonald brothers.

He was featured in the documentary series The Food That Built America on the History channel. He was featured in Tim Harford's BBC World Service radio show 50 Things That Made the Modern Economy in the episode, "Fast food franchise", which depicts the boom that his franchisee model provided for the fast food industry.

He was critical of workers sitting or leaning while at work, using the catchphrase "If you've got time to lean, you've got time to clean." According to Jacobin writer Alex N. Press, the catchphrase has become popular with managers.

== See also ==
- Colonel Sanders - Founder of KFC
- Den Fujita – Japanese businessman (1926–2004)
- History of McDonald's
- List of ambulance drivers during World War I

Business positions
| Preceded by Harry J. Sonneborn | CEO of McDonald's; 1967–1973 | Succeeded by Fred L. Turner |
