= Bořice =

Municipality in the Pardubice Region

- Municipality
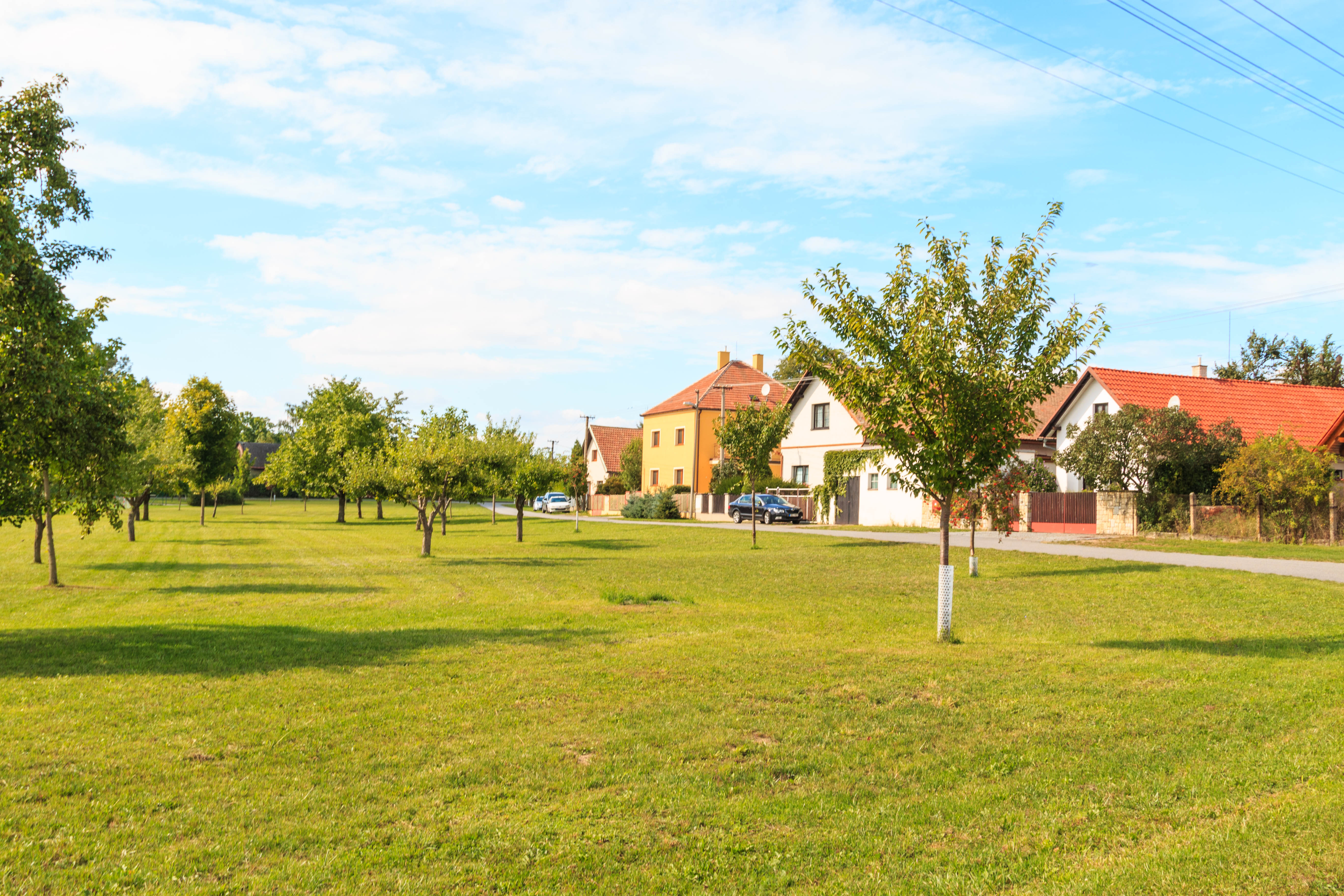
- Centre of Bořice

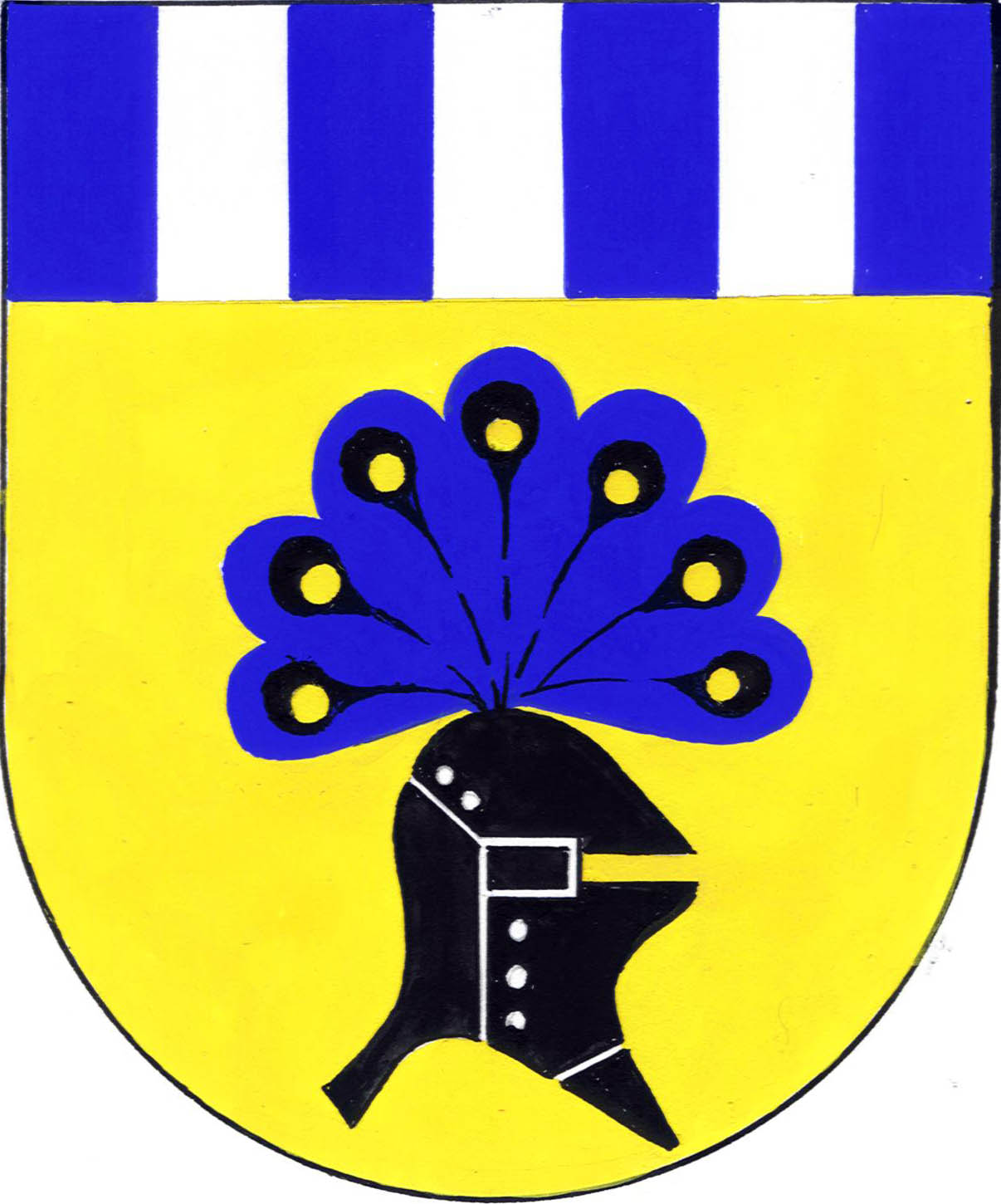
- Flag Coat of arms

- Location in the Czech Republic
- Coordinates: 49°58′37″N 15°55′31″E
- Country: Czech Republic
- Region: Pardubice
- District: Chrudim
- First mentioned: 1382

Area
  - Total: 3.20 km^{2} (1.24 sq mi)
- Elevation: 245 m (804 ft)

Population (2026-01-01)
  - Total: 199
  - Density: 62.2/km^{2} (161/sq mi)
- Time zone: UTC+1 (CET)
  - Summer (DST): UTC+2 (CEST)
- Postal code: 538 62
- Website: www.obec-borice.cz

Bořice is a municipality and village in Chrudim District in the Pardubice Region of the Czech Republic. It has about 200 inhabitants.

== Demographics ==
Historical population
| Year | Pop. | ±% |
|---|---|---|
| 1869 | 427 | — |
| 1880 | 509 | +19.2% |
| 1890 | 457 | −10.2% |
| 1900 | 437 | −4.4% |
| 1910 | 463 | +5.9% |
| 1921 | 445 | −3.9% |
| 1930 | 416 | −6.5% |
| 1950 | 330 | −20.7% |
| 1961 | 288 | −12.7% |
| 1970 | 254 | −11.8% |
| 1980 | 214 | −15.7% |
| 1991 | 182 | −15.0% |
| 2001 | 174 | −4.4% |
| 2011 | 187 | +7.5% |
| 2021 | 196 | +4.8% |
Source: Censuses
