= Stanley Clark Meston =

American architect

Stanley Clark Meston (7 January 1910 – 30 December 1992) was an American architect most famous for designing the original Golden Arches of McDonald's restaurants. In an article about the origin of McDonald's Golden Arches, architectural historian Alan Hess wrote: "Nationwide success and proliferation have obscured the origins and creators of [the arches] in Southern California. Its architect, Stanley Clark Meston, has virtually never been credited with his contribution to American architecture."

Born in Oxnard, California, in 1910, Meston attended Los Angeles Polytechnic High School, taking basic courses in drafting and architectural history. After graduation, he apprenticed in architects' offices before becoming a licensed architect; while working in Earl Heitschmidt's office, Meston worked on the 1937 CBS building in Hollywood by Heitschmidt and William Lescaze. As did several more prominent Los Angeles architects during the Great Depression, he also worked for a time as a set designer, at Universal Pictures. Opening his own Fontana office, which ranged from two to eight employees, Meston's practice was primarily civic, including city office buildings, schools, and county facilities.

Meston's experience during the 1930s had prepared him to design the building that was to become a major influence on the car-culture architecture of the 1950s. He had worked for Wayne McAllister, a Los Angeles restaurant and drive-in architect responsible for many of the trend-setting Streamline Moderne drive-ins of the decade, including Simon's, Herbert's, Robert's, and Van de Kamp's. "Nothing in the East compares with the best things of this sort in Los Angeles", wrote Henry-Russell Hitchcock in 1940, praising in particular McAllister's Van de Kamp's design. Meston, having worked on several of these designs, was in an excellent position to reinterpret their car-oriented tradition for the generation and technology of the 1950s.

When the McDonald brothers hired Meston, they offered him a choice of being paid a flat fee or a commission each time a new restaurant was built. He chose the fee.

Meston's work has appeared in 28 countries and most of the world's principal cities, including Hong Kong, Tokyo, London, and Mexico City. In southern California and its vicinity, projects of his include the Verde Professional Building in Victorville, California; the San Bernardino County West End Courts Building; Wilbur Clark's Desert Inn in Las Vegas; and high schools in Visalia, Los Angeles, Gardena, Inglewood, Glendora, Palmdale, and several other southern California cities.
