= Richard and Maurice McDonald =

American fast food company founders

- Richard (left) and Maurice (right).
- Occupation: Businessmen
- Years active: 1940–1998
- Known for: Founding McDonald's
- Richard McDonald
- Born: February 16, 1909; Manchester, New Hampshire, U.S.
- Died: July 14, 1998 (aged 89); Manchester, New Hampshire, U.S.
- Maurice McDonald
- Born: November 26, 1902; Manchester, New Hampshire, U.S.
- Died: December 11, 1971 (aged 69); Palm Springs, California, U.S.

Richard James McDonald (February 16, 1909 – July 14, 1998) and Maurice James "Mac" McDonald (November 26, 1902 – December 11, 1971), known as the McDonald brothers, were American entrepreneurs who founded McDonald's.

The brothers opened the original McDonald's restaurant in 1940 in San Bernardino, California, where they created the Speedee Service System to produce their meals, a method that became the standard for the fast food industry. After hiring Ray Kroc as their franchise agent in 1954, they continued to run the company until they were bought out by Kroc in 1961.

== Early life ==
The McDonald brothers were born in Manchester, New Hampshire, to Irish Catholic parents Patrick James McDonald from Dingle and Margaret Anna Curran McDonald from Emlaghmore, who came to the United States as children. Maurice was born in 1902, and Richard was born in 1909. In the 1920s, the family moved to California, where Patrick opened a food stand in Monrovia in 1937.

== Careers ==
The first restaurant the McDonald brothers opened in 1937 was in Los Angeles. In the 1940s the McDonald brothers operated a successful drive-in restaurant, but found several factors were cutting into their profits. Some of the more expensive menu items, such as barbecue sandwiches, were rarely ordered, and they used actual dishes, which were constantly lost, stolen or broken, plus the reputation of drive-ins becoming seedy hangouts for teenagers was driving families away.

In 1948, the brothers fully redesigned and rebuilt their restaurant in San Bernardino to focus on a reduced menu consisting of their nine most profitable and cost-effective items: In addition to their 15-cent hamburger, the menu included a cheeseburger, soft drinks, milk, coffee, potato chips, and a slice of pie. The restaurant was about a mile from Route 66 at 1398 North E Street at West 14th Street in San Bernardino, and eventually became a museum. The first months of the revived restaurant were a struggle, as many customers expected carhops to serve them like other drive-in restaurants, rather than having to walk up to the restaurant's window to order. The brothers persisted, keeping their simple menu, aside from replacing the potato chips with french fries. The restaurant soon appealed to drivers on the go who could get a quick meal with no waiting and was also a way for an entire family to dine out inexpensively.

The McDonald brothers' restaurant was a success, and with the goal of making $1 million before they turned 50, the brothers began franchising their restaurant system in 1953. The first franchise was a restaurant in Phoenix, Arizona, operated by Neil Fox.

McDonald's drew the attention of Ray Kroc, a milkshake mixer salesman for Prince Castle. After the brothers purchased eight of his Multi-Mixers for their San Bernardino, California, restaurant, Kroc visited that restaurant in 1954. That year, the McDonald brothers hired Kroc as their franchise agent. Kroc took 1.9% of gross sales, of which the McDonald brothers got 0.5%.

The McDonald's brothers had resisted a large expansion and Kroc soon became frustrated with their desire to maintain only a small number of restaurants. The brothers also consistently told Kroc he could not make changes or improvements to things such as the original blueprint. Eventually, Kroc decided he wanted control of the company entirely; In 1961, Kroc purchased the company from the McDonald's brothers for $2,700,000 (equivalent to $29,100,000 in 2025), calculated so as to ensure each brother received $1,000,000 (equivalent to $10,800,000 in 2025) after taxes.

At the closing, Kroc became annoyed that the brothers would not transfer the real estate and rights to the original San Bernardino location to him. The brothers had told Kroc they were giving the operation, property and all, to the founding employees. In his anger, Kroc later opened a new McDonald's restaurant near the original McDonald's, which had been renamed "The Big M" because the brothers had not retained the rights to the name. "The Big M" closed six years later. Richard McDonald reportedly said that he had no regrets over the situation.

On November 30, 1984, Richard McDonald, the first cook behind the grill of a McDonald's, was served the ceremonial 50 billionth McDonald's hamburger by Ed Rensi, then-president of McDonald's USA, at the Grand Hyatt hotel in New York City.

== Death and legacy ==
Maurice died from heart failure at his home in Palm Springs, California, on December 11, 1971, at the age of 69.

Richard also died from heart failure in a nursing home in Manchester, New Hampshire, on July 14, 1998, at the age of 89. His cremains were entombed in a niche at the Mount Calvary Cemetery in Manchester.

In the 2016 film The Founder, a biopic about Kroc and his business relationship with both Maurice and Richard, Richard (Dick) McDonald is played by Nick Offerman, and John Carroll Lynch portrays Maurice (Mac) McDonald. While the film achieved critical success with its compelling story, it has also been criticized for dramatizing and distorting many of the personal and business relationships between Ray Kroc and the McDonald brothers, as well as fabricating many plot points such as the powdered milkshakes. The McDonald brothers in fact were quite pleased with the $2.7 million deal (worth approximately $28 million in 2024), and have gone on record saying so a few years after the deal, though they were displeased at the lack of recognition they received from the new McDonald's Corporation. The backstory of the Golden Arches is also inaccurate in that it was not created by Richard McDonald, but by Stanley Clark Meston, an architect hired by the brothers.

The site of the first McDonald's was purchased in 1998 by Albert Okura, founder of restaurant chain Juan Pollo, who moved his company's headquarters to the location and established an unofficial McDonald's museum on the site.
