= TX-10,000 (ship) =

Heavy-lift watercraft

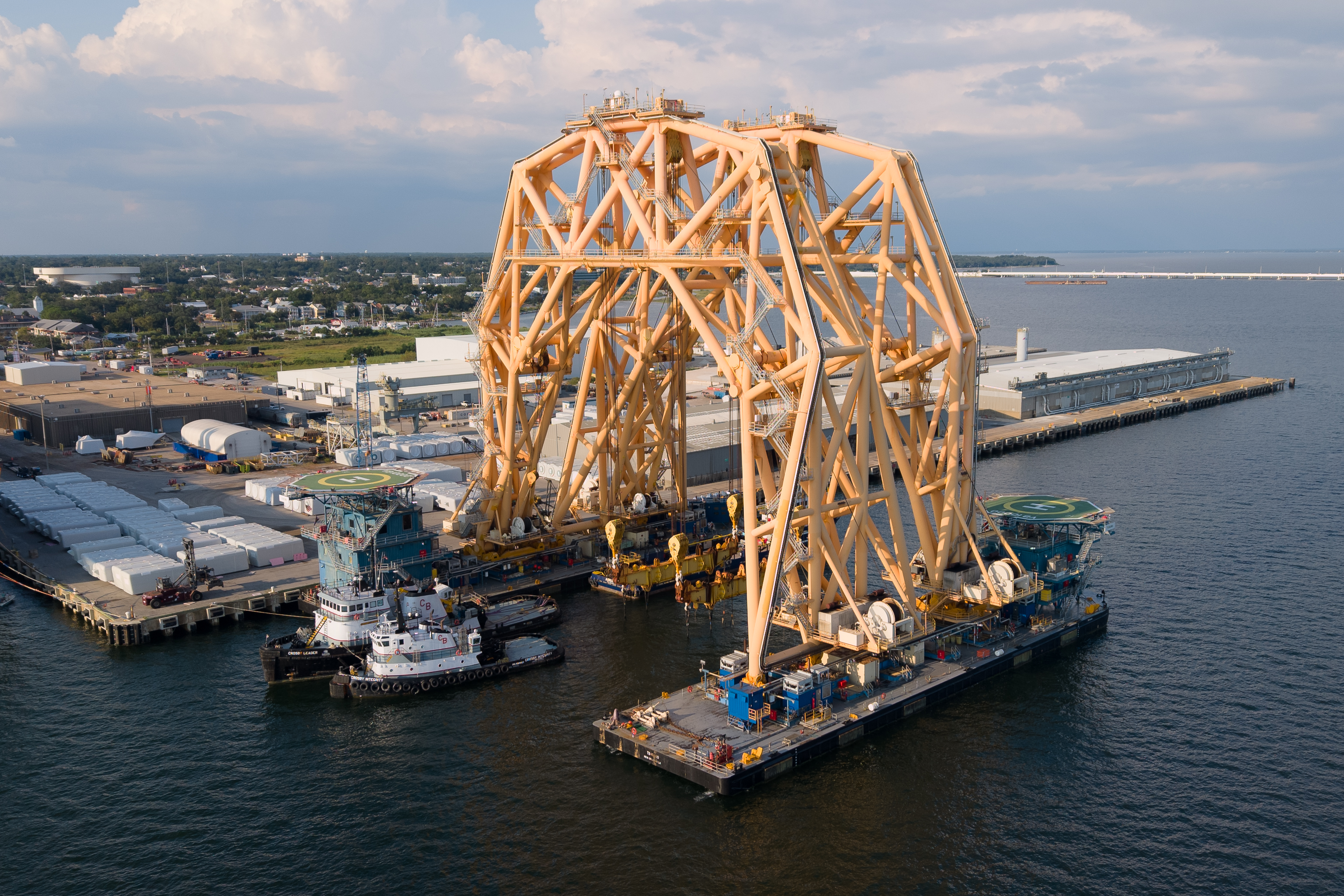
- TX-10,000 at the Port of Pensacola on September 8, 2025.

History

US
- Name: TX-10,000
- Operator: Xenos Marine
- Builder: Gulf Marine Fabricators
- Yard number: 139
- Completed: 2010
- In service: 2010–present
- Home port: Port Arthur, Texas
- Identification: USCG ID: 1225018; MMSI number: 367490050
- Status: In service

General characteristics
- Type: Floating crane vessel
- Tonnage: 10,116
- Length: 277.4 ft (84.6 m)
- Beam: 314 ft (96 m)
- Draught: 20 ft (6.1 m)
- Propulsion: (8) 1,000 hp (750 kW) azimuthing thrusters (4/barge)

TX-10,000 is a heavy-lift twin-gantry catamaran consisting of two truss space frames atop two barges. The design was derived from Versabar's earlier VB-4000 (aka Bottom Feeder), which was developed to clear debris from toppled oil drilling platforms in the Gulf of Mexico. Instead of sending divers to section the wreckage into pieces, the heavy-lift capability facilitates salvaging the platform as a single piece. The primary benefit is increasing safety by reducing the number of high-risk diving activities, but substantial cost savings can be realized by reducing the number of lifts and shortening the decommissioning schedule.

TX-10,000 is the largest lift vessel ever built in the United States. The color and shape of the trusses on TX-10,000 have prompted comparisons to the McDonald's signature Golden Arches.

== Design capabilities ==
Each truss is nearly 240 feet (73 m) at its highest point, with a hook height of 178 feet (54 m). The truss sections are decoupled from the motion of the barges by using specially designed hinges. Each truss has a "wide" side and a "narrow" side, denoting the relative footprint of the truss-to-barge connection. The "wide" side is essentially pinned to the barge with a single degree of freedom (rotational). The "narrow" side has the specially designed double joint allowing two rotational degrees of freedom. Each barge has one narrow and one wide interface. The hinges use Trelleborg AB Orkot bearings, a composite material which provide a longer life and lowered maintenance compared to the lubricated bronze bearings used in Bottom Feeder.

Once the wreck has been lifted clear of the water, there is 160 feet (49 m) of clearance between the two barge hulls for a separate cargo barge to enter. The load may be placed onto the separate barge for transportation. TX-10,000 is capable of lifting 7,500 short tons (6,800 t) in a single lift, nearly doubling the 4,000-short-ton (3,600 t) capacity of its predecessor.

Each barge is approximately 300 feet (91 m) long by 72 feet (22 m) in beam, and each barge carries four 1,000 horsepower (750 kW) dynamic positioning thrusters for station keeping without anchors and mooring lines. The dynamic positioning system is rated to class 3 standards (ABS Class DPS-3).

Claw and TX-10,000 near homeport of Port Arthur, Texas

Versabar developed "The Claw" at Chevron's request. "The Claw" is a gantry-suspended submersible grappling device designed to retrieve sunken debris without sending divers to attach rigging. Each gantry on TX-10,000 can support a single Claw, and each Claw is capable of lifting 2,000 short tons (1,800 t) from locations as deep as 350 feet (110 m) underwater. The total lifting capacity of a single Claw is 3,000 short tons (2,700 t), but the claw itself weighs 1,000 short tons (910 t). Initial sketches for the Claw were developed in December 2010, and the Claw was first deployed in August 2011.

== History ==
=== Bottom Feeder ===
Bottom Feeder was developed after Hurricanes Katrina and Rita destroyed multiple Gulf of Mexico oil platforms in 2005; it was designed to retrieve sunken platforms as a single piece. According to the Minerals Management Service, platforms that cease operation must be either left in place and repurposed as an artificial reef, or removed for disposal, within one year. Unlike typical barge cranes, which offer a single hook, Bottom Feeder consists of two barge-mounted gantry frames, each weighing 1,250 short tons (1,130 t); four independent lift blocks are suspended from the frames, each with a capacity of 1,000 short tons (910 t), allowing greater control and capacity for retrieval.

When Jon Khachaturian showed his first model in April 2006 to a prospective client, they told him that if he built it, they would use it. Bottom Feeder was built for $30 million by Gulf Marine Fabricators in Aransas Pass, Texas; work started in November 2006 and the vessel passed trials in June 2007. During its debut between June 12 and June 30 of that year, Bottom Feeder pulled four topsides from the Gulf floor which previously had been considered not retrievable. Bottom Feeder lifted more than 60,000 short tons (54,000 t) during more than 100 subsea lift operations in its first four seasons of operation. Upon reviewing the operating experience and refit plans, Versabar realized that modifications to increase hook height and lifting capacity of Bottom Feeder would be better accomplished with a completely new build.

=== Construction ===
The larger trusses planned for TX-10,000 each weighed 3,400 short tons (3,100 t), meaning that each truss would have to be built in two separate sections and then mated together, as none of the cranes at the Gulf Marine Fabricators yard in Aransas Pass were capable of lifting a completed truss. Falsework was used to support one section while the two sections were welded together, and self-propelled modular transporters moved the trusses onto one barge. Once the trusses were secured to one barge, the transporters were moved to the other half of the trusses to move them onto the second barge. After construction was complete, each gantry was proof tested with a 2,740-short-ton (2,490 t) load. TX-10,000 was towed from the yard through Aransas Pass on 7 October 2010.

Versabar announced that preliminary design work on a larger successor for operations outside the Gulf of Mexico was under way in April 2015.

=== Operations ===
TX-10,000 performed its first lift on 9 October 2010, a 1,530-short-ton (1,390 t) topside and jacket which had toppled during a storm at Vermilion 285. Approximately a week later, TX-10,000 retrieved a 2,500-short-ton (2,300 t) topside which had been damaged by fire.

The Claw was used in 20 lift projects during its first year of deployment.

TX-10,000 near St. Simons Island, Georgia, removing the wreck of the Golden Ray

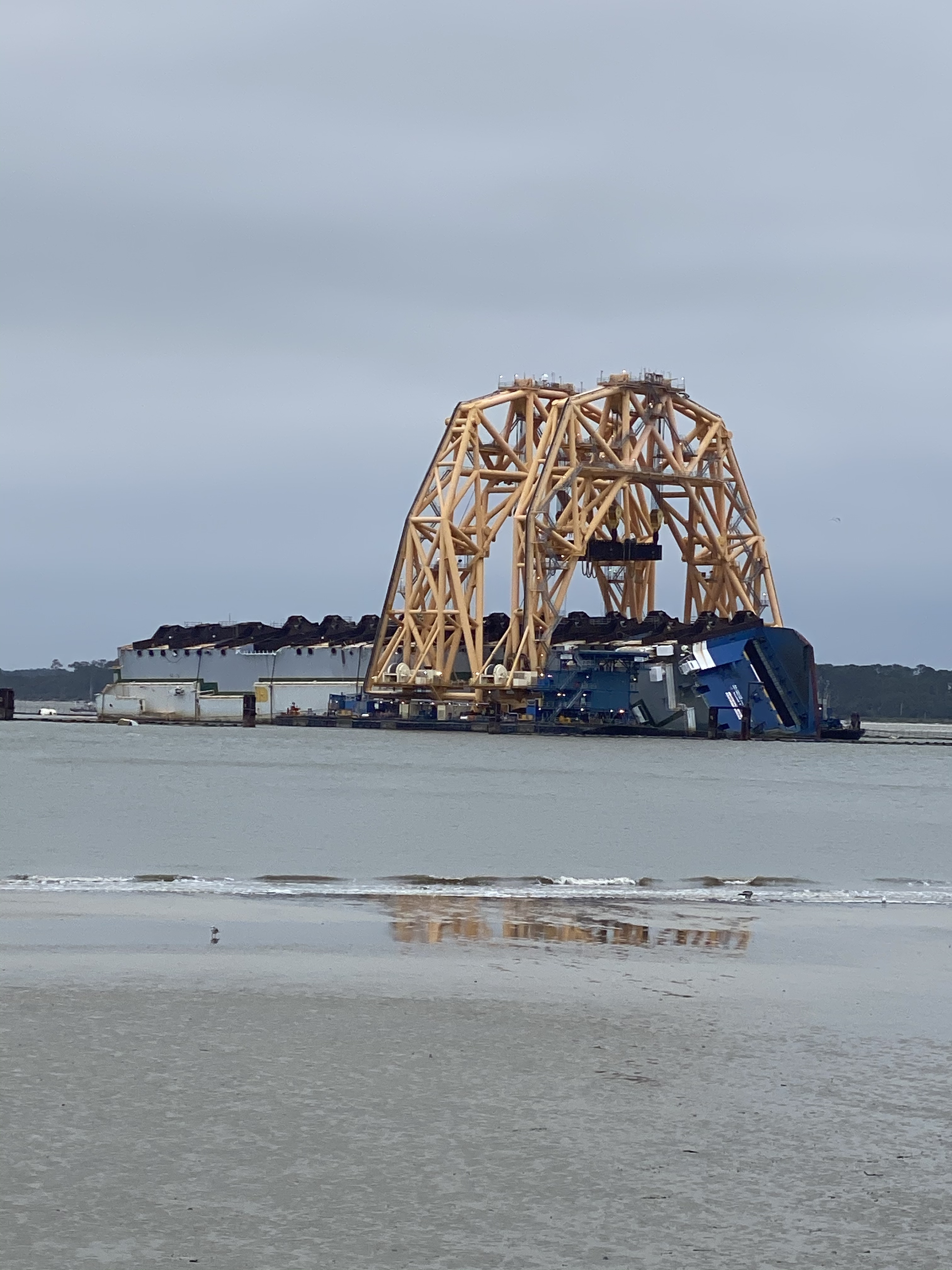
Positioned to cut the stern, with lifting frames installed (Dec 2020)

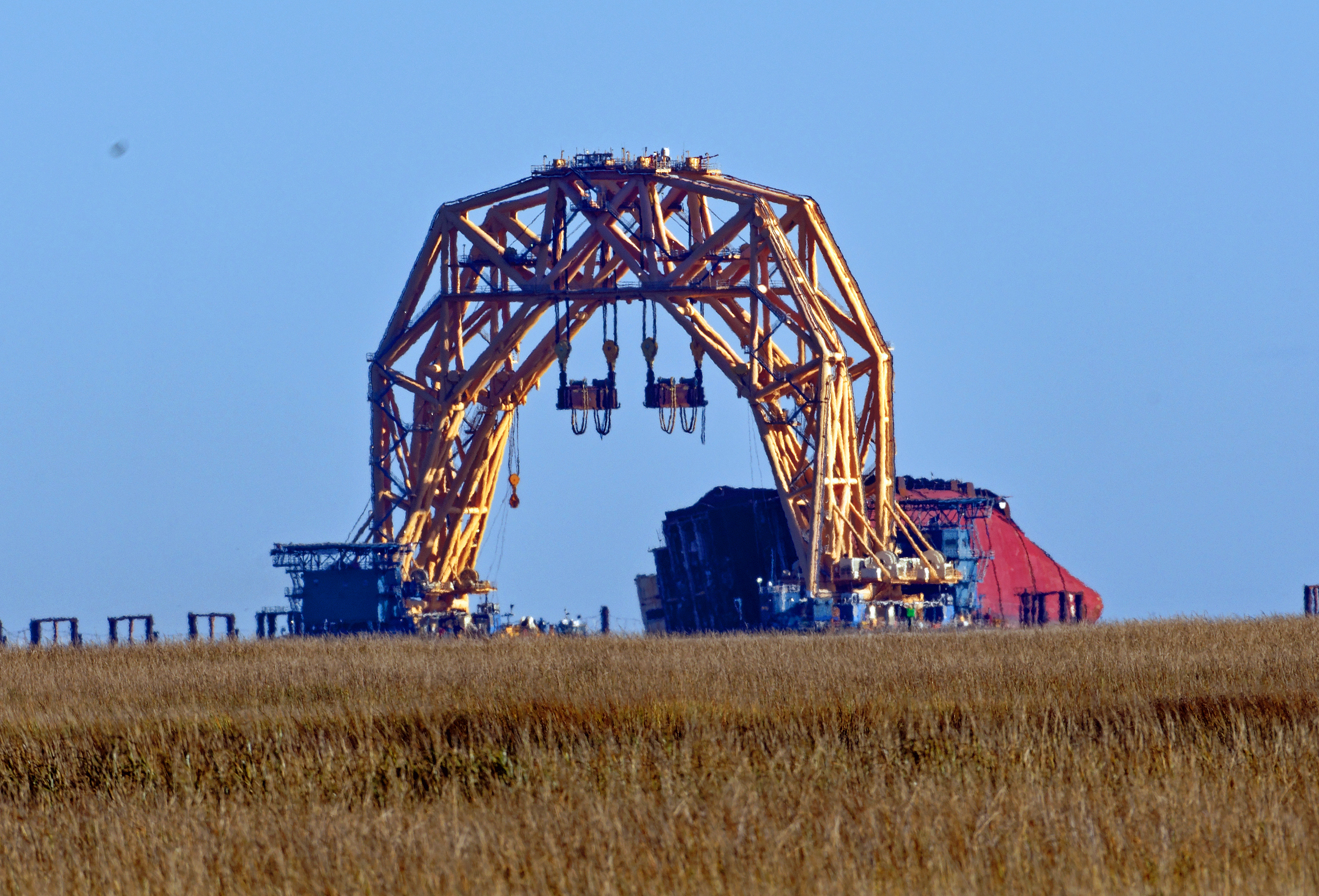
Approximately halfway complete (Jan 2021)

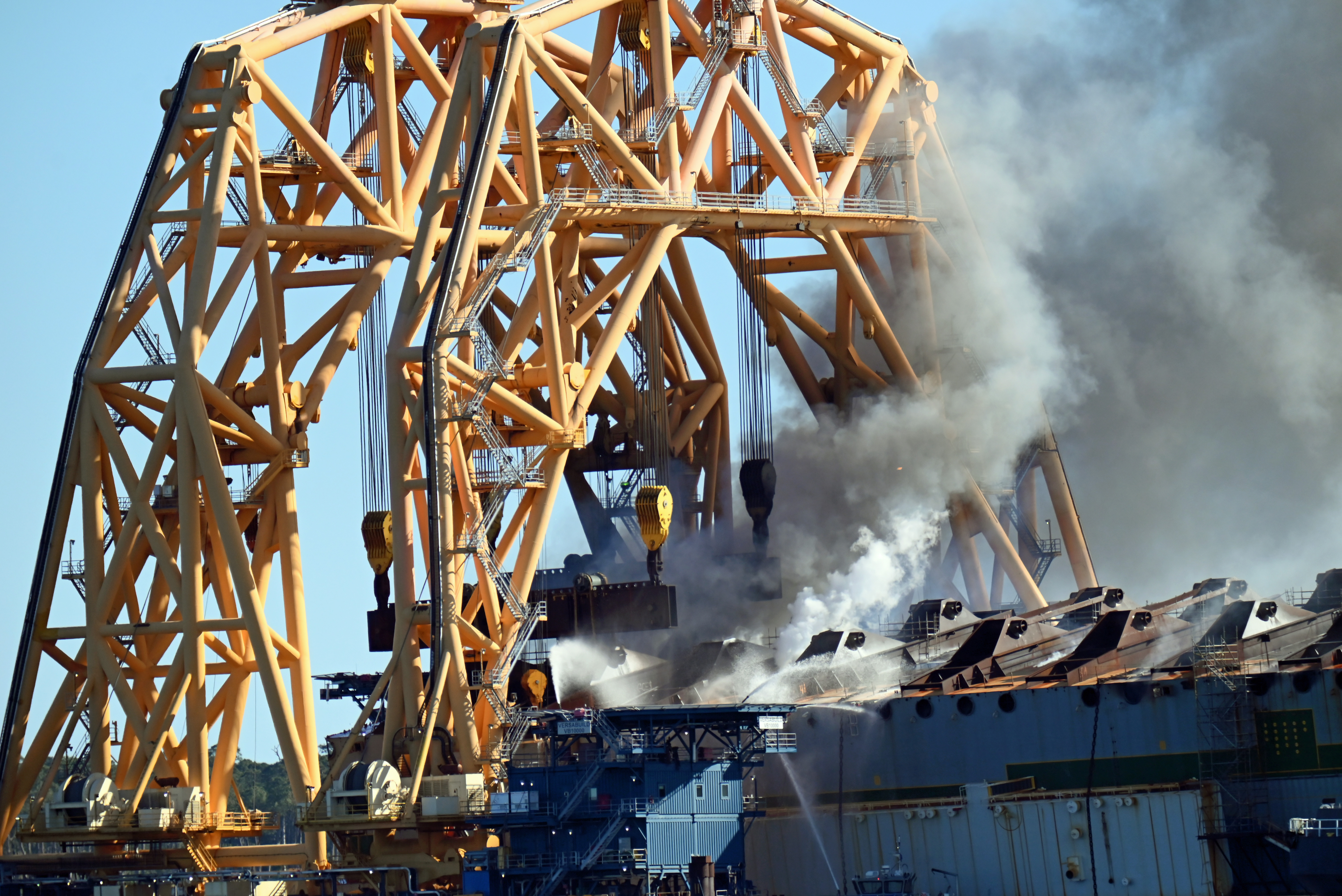
Golden Ray cargo catches fire (May 14, 2021) from a welder's torch

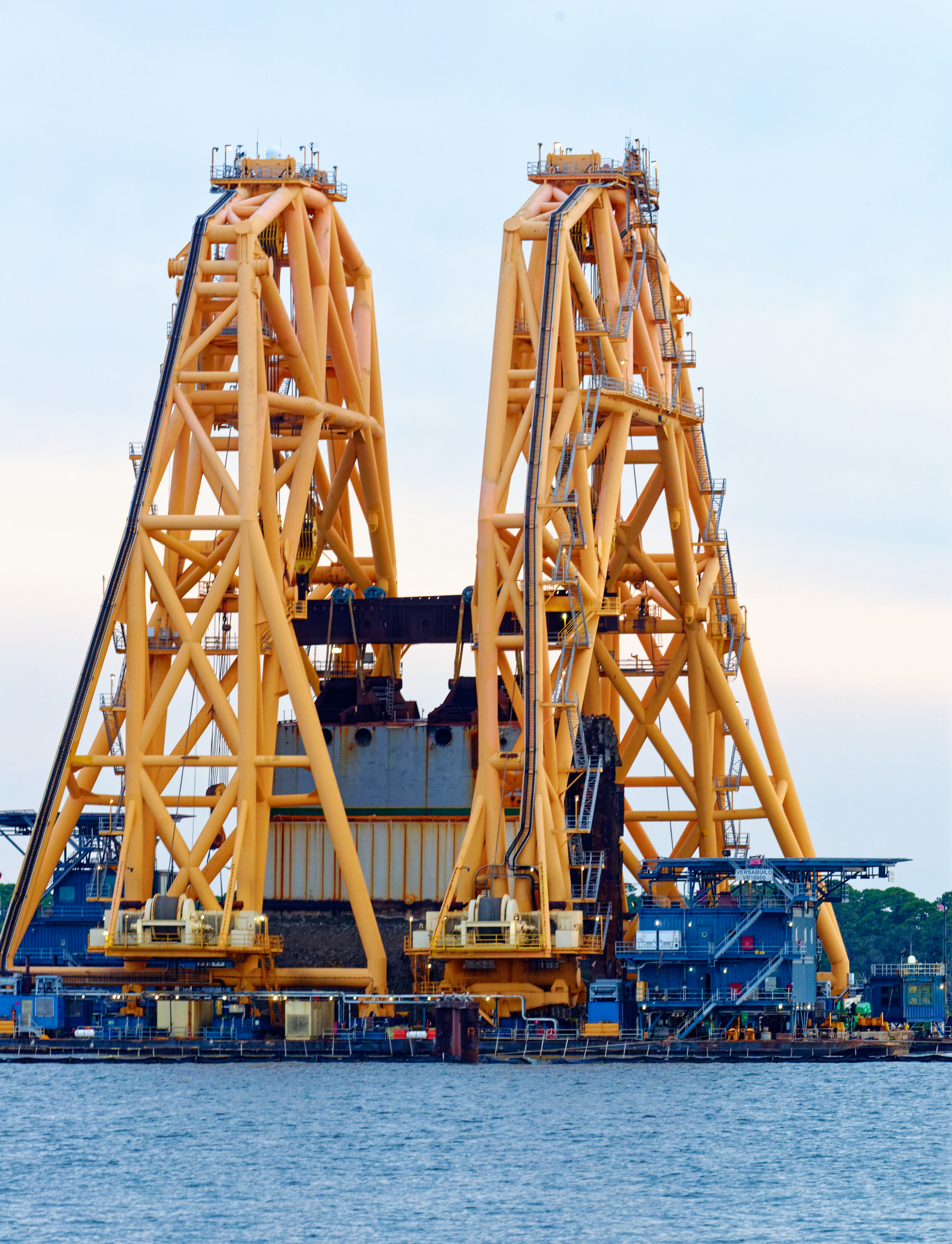
Lifting the last section (Oct 2021)

Versabar sold the vessel to TCM 10000 Inc. in October 2020; T&T Salvage, the prime contractor for the salvage of the Golden Ray, also is one of the joint venture partners in TCM 10000. On October 27, 2020, TX-10,000 arrived in Glynn County, Georgia, for the purpose of removing the Golden Ray from the St. Simons Sound, where it had been turned on its side for more than a year. The crane had been stationed in Fernandina Beach, Florida, since July, due to salvage operations being put on hold due to the ongoing COVID-19 pandemic, as well as the ongoing 2020 Atlantic hurricane season. The final large section of the Golden Ray was removed in October 2021.

=== Acquisition and renaming ===
Xenos Marine acquired the vessel in December 2024 after a five year dry dock maintenance period and renamed it from VB-10,000 to TX-10,000.
