= List of nicknames for McDonald's =

The fast food chain McDonald's is referred to by a variety of nicknames worldwide.

== List ==
Nickname	Country	Notes	Reference(s)
McDonal	Chile	The signs for McDonald's have been altered in a way that the full name 'McDonald's' is visible during the day, but at night, it appears as 'McDonal'.	
Donken, Gyllene Måsen	Sweden	Using the first syllable as a basis for a nickname would be confusing in Swedish, as "mack" means gas/petrol station. Gyllene Måsen (Golden Gull) because the M looks like a drawing of a bird flying.	
Golden Arches	United States	Further information: Golden Arches	
Macca's	Australia; New Zealand	The nickname is common in these countries and is officially used in advertisements. In 2013, "Macca's" began being used on some store signs in Australia.	
Mäckes, Mecces, Mekkes, Mcces, Mäckies, Mäcci, McDoof, Goldene Schwalbe, Gasthaus zur goldenen Möwe, Schachtelwirt or Möwenwirt (esp. Bavaria)	Germany	Goldene Schwalbe (golden swallow) and Goldene Möwe (golden seagull), similar to Golden Arches in the US or Denmark. Mäckes, Mecces, Mekkes, Mcces, Mäckies and Mäcci are regional variations of the same name (see source). See Danish nickname. Southern German Mäcci is also used in Austria.	
Den Gyldne Måge, Maccen	Denmark	meaning Golden Seagull, compare german entry.	
Mickey D's, McDicks	United States, Canada		
Mac, mak	Poland		
Mak Kee; Mak-Gei; M-Gei	Hong Kong	Common practice in Hong Kong is to nickname foreign companies by taking the first syllable of the company and combining with the Cantonese word for store (gei).	
Mäkk	Estonia	Most people refer to McDonald's as Mäkk in informal talk.	
Mäkkäri, Mäkki	Finland		
Makudo, Makku	Japan	Makudo was selected by Kansai and some Shikoku locals as the official nickname. Makku was selected by the rest of Japan as the official nickname.	
McDo	France; Belgium; Morocco; Philippines; Canada (Québec) Lebanon		
McD's	United Kingdom (Scotland)		
MacDonald, Don’s	Canada	The nickname is also used in areas close to the Canada–United States border.	
McDona's	Mexico		
Mec	Italy, Romania		
Mekáč	Czech Republic; Slovakia	The nickname is officially used in advertisements.	
Meki	Hungary	The nickname is officially used in advertisements.	
Mekdi	Malaysia; Brunei Darussalam; Indonesia	The nickname has been used in advertisements.	
Méqui	Brazil	McDonalds uses the Méqui branding alongside McDonalds.	
Mäc / McDo	Switzerland	German-speaking Swiss call it Mäc and French-speaking Swiss call it McDo	
Макдак (McDuck)	Russia	The slang nickname is similar to the family name of Clan McDuck. It was proposed as the new name for McDonalds after the chain decided to abandon its operations in Russia.	
Maccern, Mækker'n	Norway	Common nickname with multiple spellings. Maccern has been used in promotional material since at least late 2023 or early 2024.	
Maķītis	Latvia		
Rotten Ronnie’s	Canada	Popular across Canada	
Maccers	Ireland		
Maccies, Maccy D’s	United Kingdom, Ireland		
Mek	Slovenia		
McD	India		
MacRata	Peru		
Mäcci	Austria	Most people refer to McDonald's as Mäcci in informal talk, and the nickname is officially used in advertisements by the company. Also common in southern Germany.	
