= Golden Ray =

Sunken car carrier

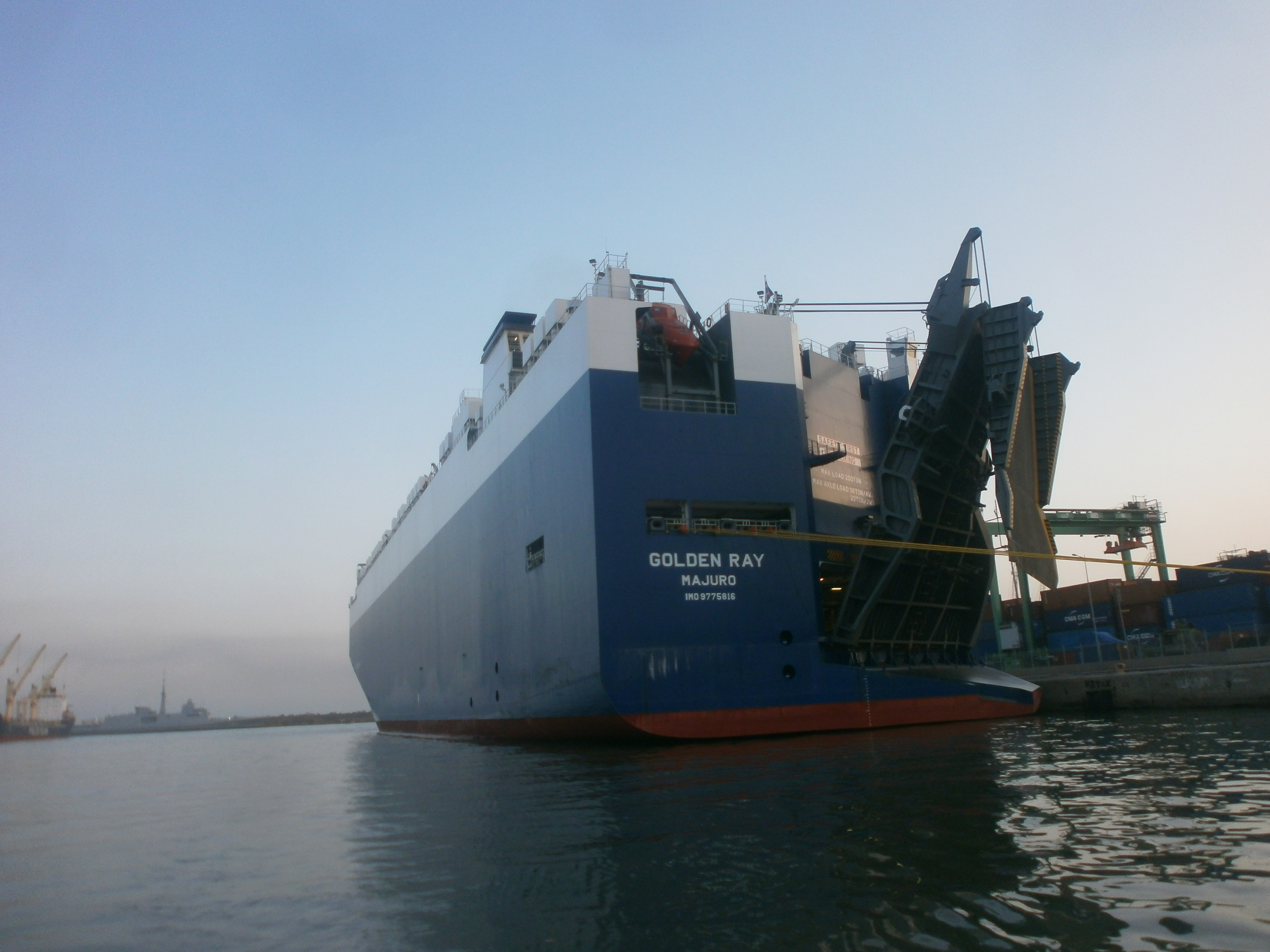
- Golden Ray at Casablanca, Morocco

History
- Name: Golden Ray
- Operator: Hyundai Glovis
- Port of registry: Majuro
- Builder: Hyundai Mipo Dockyard
- Yard number: H.8151
- Laid down: 23 December 2015
- Launched: 26 August 2016
- Out of service: 8 September 2019
- Identification: IMO number: 9775816
- Fate: Scrapped

General characteristics
- Tonnage: 71,178 GT
- Length: 199.95 m (656 ft 0 in)
- Beam: 35.40 m (116 ft 2 in)
- Draft: 10.60 m (34 ft 9 in)
- Decks: 16 (cargo on decks 1 through 13)
- Installed power: 12,927 kW (17,335 hp) diesel
- Propulsion: 1 propeller
- Speed: 19.5 knots (36.1 km/h; 22.4 mph) at 77.2 RPM
- Capacity: 7,742 vehicles
- Crew: 23

Golden Ray was a 200-metre-long (660 ft) roll-on/roll-off cargo ship designed to carry automobiles that capsized on 8 September 2019 in St. Simons Sound near the Port of Brunswick in Georgia, United States. She was eventually declared a total loss and was removed as scrap.

== Design ==
Golden Ray was built by Hyundai Mipo Dockyard in Ulsan, South Korea. Her keel was laid on 23 December 2015, and she was launched on 26 August 2016. She was delivered from the builder on 12 May 2017, and at the time of her capsizing was owned and operated by Hyundai Glovis. Golden Ray measured 71,118 gross tonnage (GT) and 20,995 tons deadweight (DWT), and was 200 metres (656 ft 2 in) long, with a beam of 35.4 metres (116 ft 2 in). She was powered by a single diesel engine that gave her a service speed of 19.5 knots (36.1 km/h; 22.4 mph) via a single propeller, and had a capacity of up to 7,400 cars.

== Capsizing ==
Golden Ray began her final voyage by loading vehicles at the ports of Veracruz (19–22 August 2019), Altamira (24–25 August), and Freeport (27–30 August); from there, the ship proceeded to Jacksonville (6–7 September) and Brunswick (7–8 September), where some vehicles were unloaded and others loaded. She then was scheduled to sail to Baltimore, Wilmington, Beirut, Jeddah, Sohar, Jebel Ali, Dammam, and Kuwait. When she left Brunswick, the vessel was carrying approximately 4,300 brand new Kia and Hyundai cars manufactured in Mexico, and vehicles made by other companies including Chevrolet, GMC, GM, Mercedes-Benz, and Ram to Baltimore, Maryland; some were destined for delivery to the Middle East.

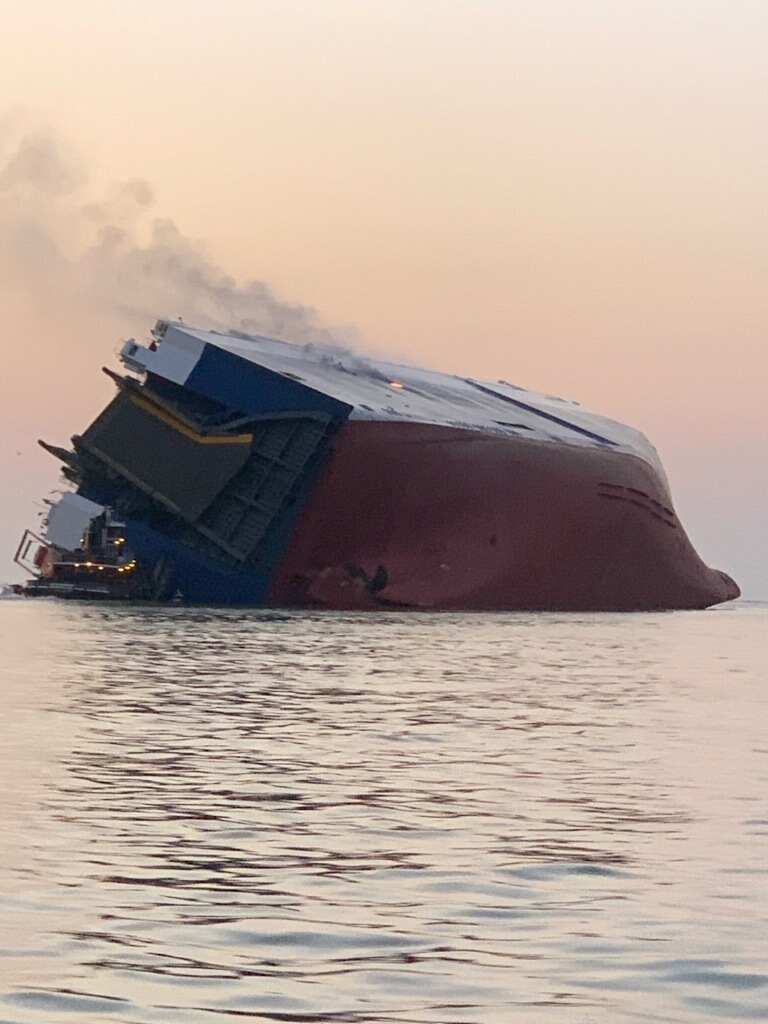
Sunrise, 8 September 2019

On 8 September 2019 at approximately 01:37 EDT, Golden Ray capsized within the Port of Brunswick's harbor, shortly after unberthing and proceeding towards the Port of Baltimore. After the cargo was loaded at the dock in Brunswick, the chief officer transferred 8 t (7.9 long tons; 8.8 short tons) of water from the no. 5 port water ballast tank in the ship's double bottom to the no. 5 starboard water ballast tank, correcting the list from 0.42° to port to 0.03° to starboard. At the time, Golden Ray was displacing 34,609 t (34,062 long tons; 38,150 short tons), with drafts of 30.8 and 31.2 ft (9.4 and 9.5 m) forward and aft, respectively. The ship departed the dock at approximately 00:54 EDT and executed two turns to port at 01:22 EDT and 01:29 EDT, traveling at approximately 12 kn (22 km/h; 14 mph). At 01:35 EDT, the state-provided maritime pilot ordered a starboard turn; the pilot noted the vessel "felt directionally unstable ... when I started the turn, she wanted to keep turning" and ordered the rudder be returned to center at 01:37 EDT. However, the vessel started to heel to port rapidly. To counteract this, the rudder was turned to port, but the vessel continued to turn to starboard and heel over. The list reached 60° within a minute as the bow thruster and reverse engine orders were issued to counteract the list. At 01:40 EDT, the ship ran aground. The ship's master previously had ordered the portside pilot door on deck 5 to be opened at 01:08 EDT, to prepare for the departure of the pilot. Water began to enter the vessel through the open pilot door, flooding the engine and steering gear rooms; as tugboats pushed the ship out of the deep channel, she came to rest on her port side.

Sequence during capsizing of Golden Ray, using positions from voyage data recorder
1 0053: Departs from Colonel's Island Terminal
2 0114: Passes under Sidney Lanier Bridge at 12 kn (22 km/h; 14 mph), heading 113°
3 0122:43: Turns to port onto heading 075° at 11.5 kn (21.3 km/h; 13.2 mph)
4 0128:50: Turns to port onto heading 037° at 12.0 kn (22.2 km/h; 13.8 mph)
5 0134:53: Begins turn to starboard for heading 105° at 12.0 kn (22.2 km/h; 13.8 mph)
6 0140:18: Runs aground in St. Simons Sound, listing to port at 60°

This serious listing caused the port to close immediately. Two United States Coast Guard (USCG) response boats were launched from Coast Guard Station Brunswick, CG 45741 and CG 29139, arriving at 02:05 and 03:00 EDT, respectively. All 23 crewmen on board as well as an American pilot survived, including three engineers who were in the ship's engine room at the time of the incident. The pilot and 19 of the 23 crew were rescued by first responders the first night; the last rescued that night was the chief engineer at 06:45 EDT, who was in a stateroom beneath the port bridge wing. At approximately 04:30 EDT, first responders noticed smoke and flames erupting from the starboard side, as a fire was consuming the vehicles inside the ship; the toxic smoke and heat prevented further rescue operations for approximately 24 hours until the fire had burned itself out.

The next day, the USCG located and rescued the remaining four crew members that were missing, three engineers and an engineering cadet. At the time the ship capsized they were trapped in the stern: two engineers were in the engine control room on deck 4, while the other engineer and cadet were in the adjacent engine room occupying decks 2 and 3 making routine checks. The engineers in the control room were prevented from leaving by incoming water, which was spilling down the primary access stairwell from the open door on deck 5; one was able to escape through an aft-facing door and joined the engineer and cadet in the engine room, while the other stayed in the control room. On the same day of the capsize, at 16:12 EDT, first responders reported hearing tapping noises from within the vessel. A 2.5 in diameter (64 mm) hole was drilled at 13:00 EDT on September 9 to contact the engineers, who were trapped in sweltering 155 °F (68 °C) heat; the hull was cut open and all four were rescued by 17:51 EDT, appearing to be in good medical condition.

=== Investigations ===
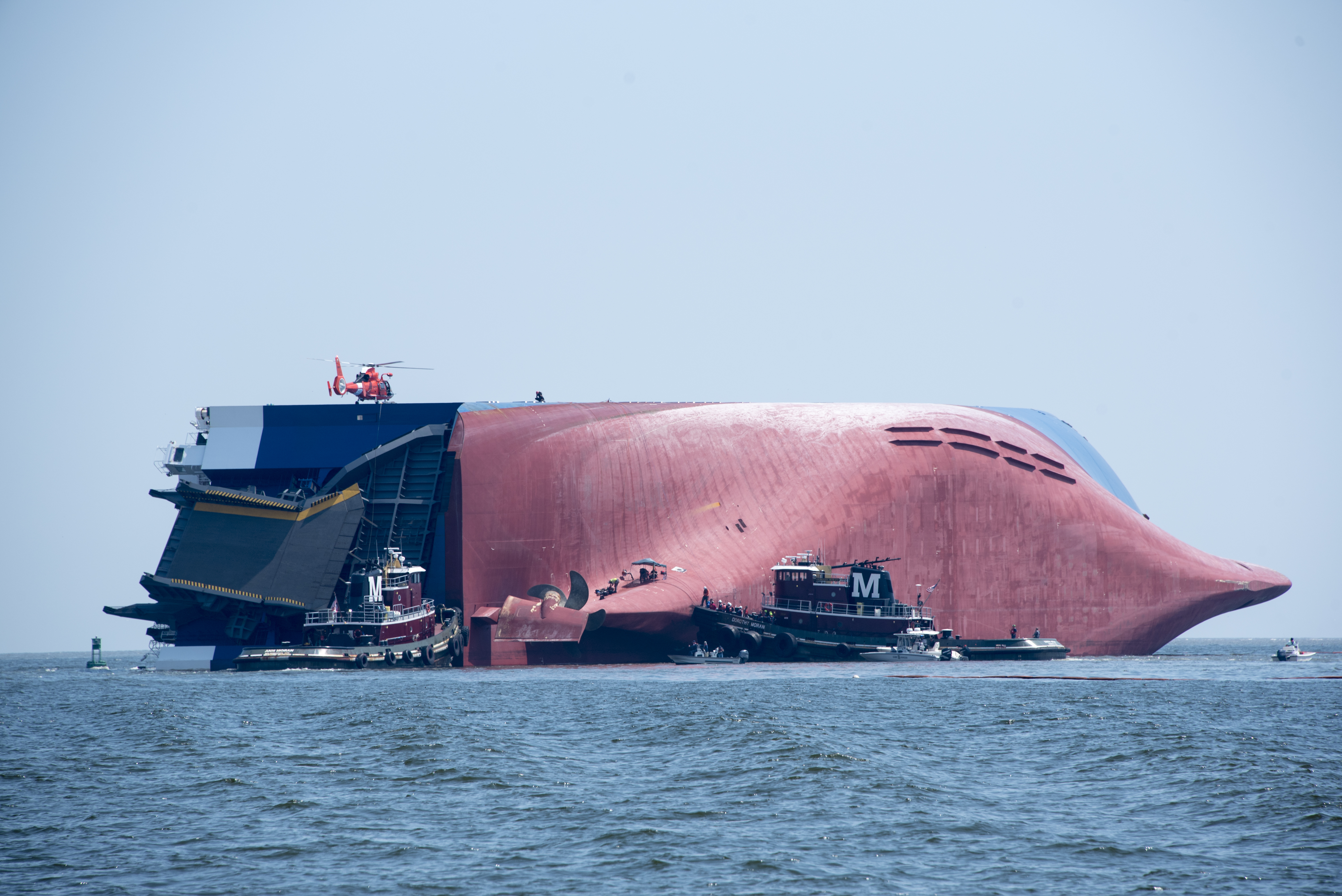
Golden Ray photographed capsized on 9 September 2019

The incident was suspected to be related to a sudden loss of stability, possibly due to cargo stowage and incorrect water ballasting. A Hyundai Glovis executive told the news media that "there was some kind of an internal fire that could not be controlled and then it capsized". A fire delayed the rescue of the last crew member.

In September 2020, the USCG held a public hearing to gather factual evidence and testimony for the Marine Board of Investigation into the capsizing of the M/V Golden Ray, chaired by Captain Blake Welborn. The public hearing concluded on September 22.

The National Transportation Safety Board agreed to assist in investigating the capsize, with two investigators assigned to the case. A final NTSB report, adopted 26 August 2021, determined the cause of sinking to be a combination of factors. The direct cause was incorrect entries for ballast for the ship's stability calculation program. The program entry error was compounded because there was no procedure to verify the entries. The incorrect entries meant the program did not compute the proper levels for ballast tanks, which left the ship unstable as she made a sharp turn when exiting the channel. When the ship heeled to port, the open portside pilot door allowed water to enter; other watertight doors that were not properly closed also allowed flooding.

=== Environmental concerns ===
In November 2019, The New York Times quoted Fletcher Sams, the executive director of the Altamaha Riverkeeper, a nonprofit that monitors pollution in Georgia's Altamaha River, describing “a concoction of contaminants” already found in the water that included gas and heavy bunker fuel that powered the ship, as well as gasoline, diesel and antifreeze from the vehicles that were being transported. As of mid-November 2019, it remained unknown how much had flowed into the sound. The discharge could have been limited to a small amount, but the oil and chemicals could have also washed into marshland and seeped into the sediment. Concern was also expressed about a new wave of contaminants from the capsized ship when she was cut up for salvage. Oil-coated grass and floating tarballs were observed around St. Simon's Sound and St. Simon's Island. On 1 August 2021, upon completion of the section six cut of the ship, a significant amount of oil began to leak. As a result, beach advisories were issued across the St Simon’s Sound and Jekyll Island area. Mitigation strategies were put in place in and around the environmental protection barrier to prevent further spread of the oil. The barrier was originally put in place to protect marine life from the dismantling effort.

== Salvage ==
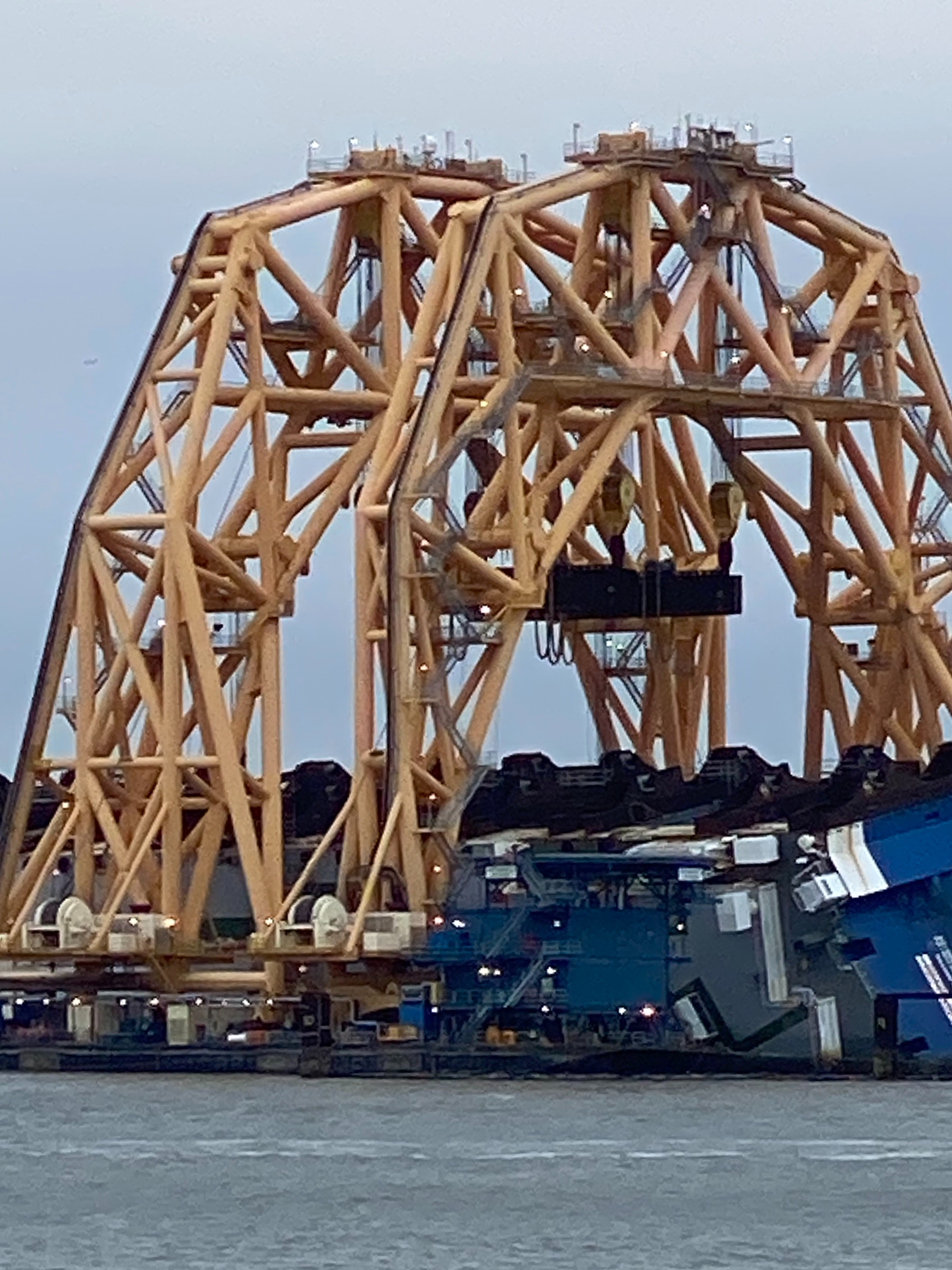
Preparing to cut off the stern in December 2020

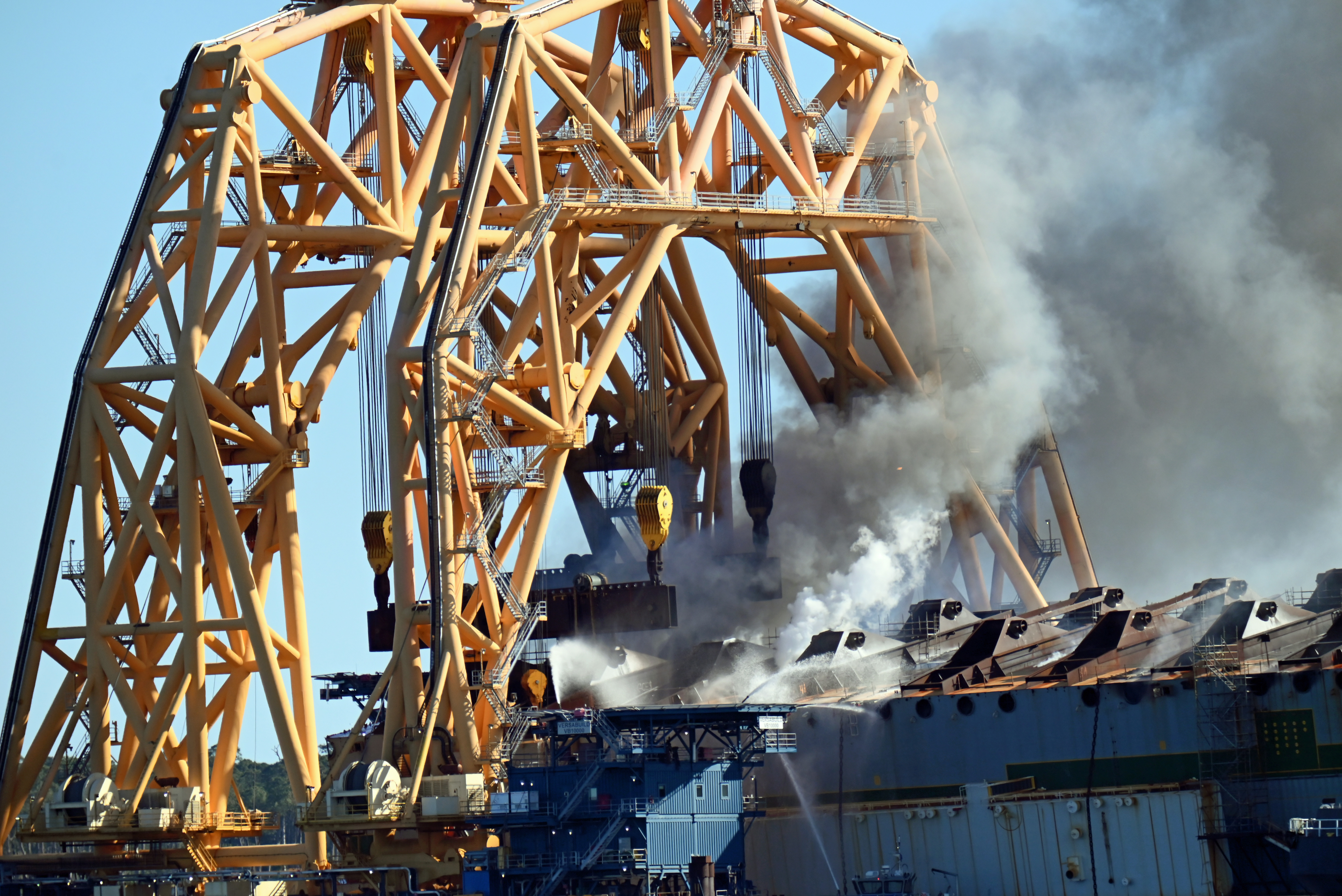
The ship on fire, 14 May 2021

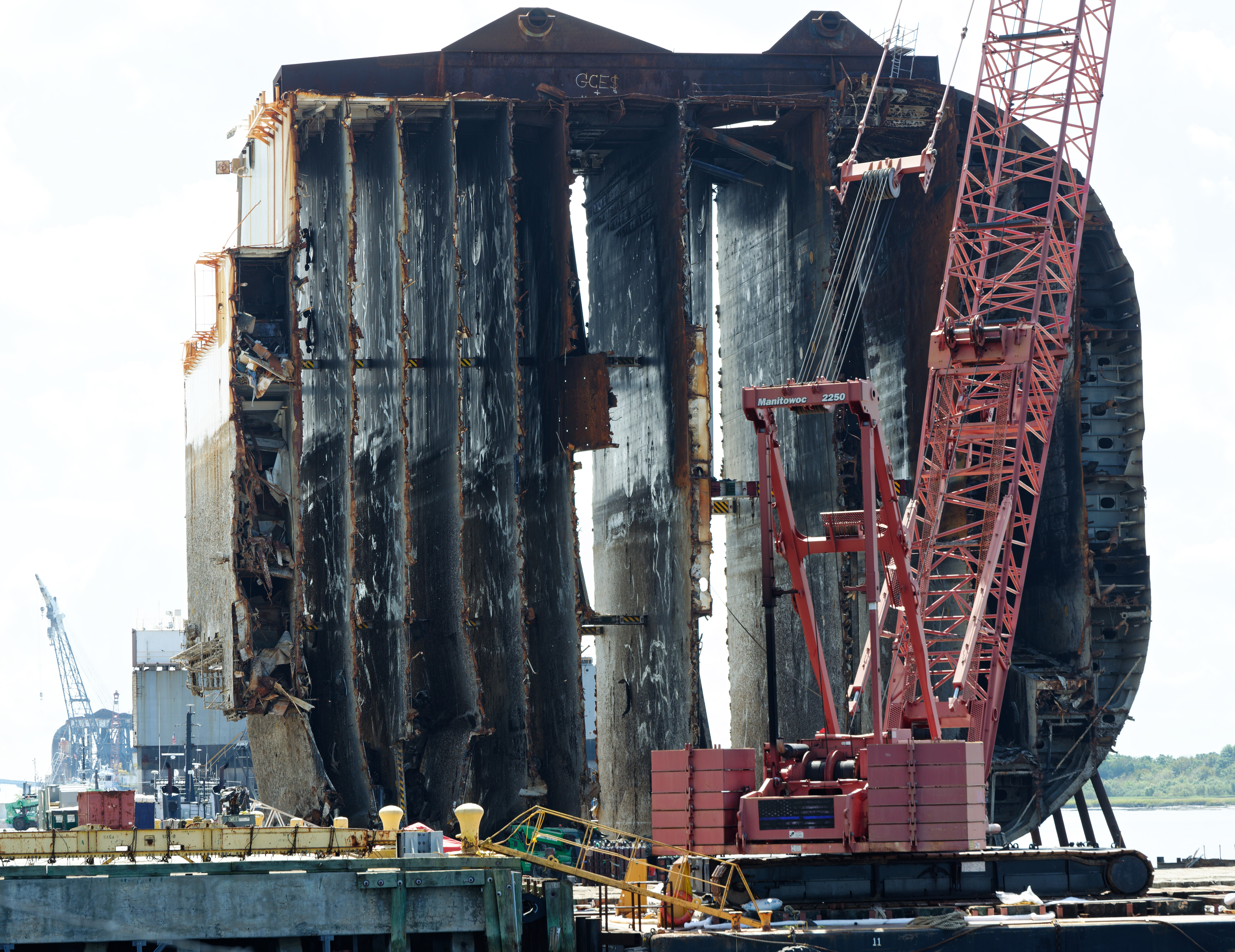
A section of the ship in Brunswick, Georgia, October 2021

The ship had 24 fuel tanks, and all were almost full when she capsized. By 27 September, two of them had been pumped out and vents on the others were plugged. 15,500 US gallons (59,000 L; 12,900 imp gal) had been pumped out, of a total of 300,000 US gallons (1,100,000 L; 250,000 imp gal) believed to be on board. The port continued to operate through the salvage process, with some delays. The salvage operation was expected to take several months, and a team was sent to Chile to examine her sister ship, Silver Ray, to better understand the internal layout. There were twelve tanks near the engine room and twelve elsewhere on the ship. The salvage crews were monitoring for any pollution caused by leaks.

In October 2019, due to the fire, saltwater corrosion, and salvage costs, the Golden Ray was declared a total loss, and it was announced that the ship would be cut up in place and scrapped. Insurance losses on the ship were estimated at $70-80 million, and $80 million in her contents. The salvage work was to be done by T&T Salvage utilizing the Versabar heavy lift vessel VB-10,000. On 13 December 2019, Coast Guard authorities confirmed that salvage workers had removed all the vessel's fuel.

On 20 January 2020, salvage workers had to cope with another fire on board the vessel. In February 2020, it was announced that the vessel would be cut into eight sections weighing between 2,700 and 4,100 tons that will then be removed on barges for disposal. In late October, the VB-10,000 heavy lift vessel arrived and was in position over the wreck on 27 October. Cutting operations began on 6 November 2020.

In late November 2020, the first cut was completed, removing the vessel's bow. It was expected to take 24 hours, but after delays caused by tropical storms, and a broken cutting chain, it took over 20 days. The stern was intended to be removed in the second cut.

On 22 January 2021, preparations for the separation of "Section 7" from the wreck were underway. Preparations were also underway for the cutting of "Section 2".

On 14 May 2021, the ship caught fire and crews were dispatched to extinguish the flames. The fire, which broke out while a section containing the engine room was being cut free, was extinguished the same day.

On 6 July 2021, "Section 3" was removed leaving two more cuts and three more sections before the project would be complete, which was still expected to take several more months.

The final cut was completed on 5 September 2021, and preparations were made to lift the two remaining sections and secure them to barges. The sections were held in the Port of Brunswick until they could be prepared for transport, which included removing all automobiles from the ship for processing at a local scrapyard. The ship sections themselves were then transported by barge to Gibson, Louisiana to be broken up. The final section of the wreck was removed on 25 October 2021 and the removal of the wreck was completed. The Coast Guard stated it was the largest wreck removal operation in United States history.

On 26 September 2021, the Coast Guard held a press conference, to announce the removal of the last section, and the completion of the largest removal of a capsized ship in U.S. history. This was "a difficult and complicated operation." Experts from various nations were consulted. In addition to the ship herself, the salvage operation collected debris from the shore and water amounting to 9,500 pounds (4,300 kg) of debris not related to the ship, and 8,000 pounds (3,600 kg) of debris from the ship. This resulted in the nearby marshes, and beaches, being cleaner than they had been in many years.

== See also ==
- Tricolor, a sunken car carrier which was cut into pieces during salvage starting in 2003
