= Louis Cheskin =

American psychologist (1907–1981)

Louis Cheskin was a scientific researcher, clinical psychologist, and marketing professional. Born in the Russian Empire on February 17, 1907, he was a one-time Works Progress Administration (WPA) artistic supervisor. He died of a heart attack at Stanford University Hospital on October 10, 1981, at age 72.

He observed that people's perceptions of products and services were directly related to aesthetic design, and named this relationship sensation transference.

Cheskin spent most of his life investigating how design elements impacted people's perceptions of value, appeal, and relevance. He also discovered that most people could not resist transferring their feelings towards the packaging to the product itself.

Based on consumer feedback, Cheskin recommended changing the colour of Jelke's Good Luck margarine from traditional white to yellow. Furthermore, he changed the wrapper material from waxed paper to foil to represent a higher quality product. These simple recommendations dramatically improved the product's sales, and are still in use for many margarine and dairy products.

== Early career ==
In the 1930s, Louis Cheskin founded the Color Research Institute of America in Chicago, renamed Louis Cheskin Associates. (Note: Renamed 'Cheskin Research' after his death.) He was one of the first marketers to use customer-centric methods and to value direct customer input above marketers' expectations or guesses about customers' needs. By the 1950s, Cheskin had implemented the concept that brands, messages, and offerings could be coordinated and delivered through multiple contexts and media. He relied on scientific testing procedures and detailed standards, including colour guides. One such standard was first to understand, then explain what companies had to offer in a way that customers understood.

Published in 1951, Louis Cheskin's Color for Profit initiated a scientific approach to color and design. Cheskin's philosophy rotates around three core concepts: good taste has little to do with how well a design sells, asking customers what they think of a package design is not a useful way to measure effectiveness, and colors have symbolic meanings.

== Changing the face of Ford ==
In researching the automobile market in 1957, Cheskin wrote a scathing prediction that the Edsel motor car would be a market flop because its styling did not portray a coherent aesthetic and reflect the changing trend toward modernism. Inversely, he predicted the massive success of the Ford Thunderbird. Experts of the time had made the opposite prediction based on the comparative size of the companies' advertising budgets. Though Henry Ford and the automotive industry initially denounced Cheskin's opinion, Ford subsequently included Cheskin in the Ford Falcon project after his forecast proved correct. While the Falcon project had progressed too far to make use of his research results, his new insights were incorporated into the Ford Mustang, one of Ford's most successful cars. Cheskin helped rigorously test the Mustang in experiential prototypes.

Based on the success of the Mustang, in 1960 Ford asked Cheskin to research and develop the Lincoln Continental, the country's first modernist 'luxury' car. Using his research techniques, Cheskin recommended a radically different advertising approach with the Continental's launch. He created the first magazine designed to sell a product for exclusive distribution through country clubs. Driving events at country clubs were also promoted. Initially, this approach relied almost exclusively on word of mouth and represented an early use of guerrilla marketing.

Cheskin viewed these innovations as part of the process; natural extensions of his understanding of customer experience. In his view, there were no meaningful distinctions between advertising, price, packaging, product use, or the brand promotion. He approached these as an integrated whole.

Ford's close involvement with Cheskin in their product development was also unusual for the times.

== Sensation transference ==
Most people make unconscious assessments of a product, service, or event based on both the item itself and on secondary sensory input associated with the item, resulting in a general impression – whether intended or not, accurate or not. Cheskin called this "sensation transference".

Cheskin's innovative insight was that impressions created in customers' minds, based on experiencing products sensorially, transferred directly to concepts of value, price, quality, and emotion. These, in turn, created and fulfilled expectations of satisfaction. Cheskin's research didn't always explain why these associations existed, but he confirmed that they did play an important role in both customer choice and satisfaction.

Cheskin's work was not just focused on appearance. Often his research led to understanding that added value and changed the product or service offering in valuable ways. For example, initially McDonald's operated burger-stands designed for walk-up service. Cheskin's research showed that these configurations were uncomfortable for families, particularly women alone with their children, accounting for low sales to these customers. Cheskin was able to show that tables, chairs, and a semblance of walls helped these customers feel safe and comfortable visiting and eating on-site. Later, this understanding led to the transformation of the burger-stands into restaurants. Research on color use and imagery, too, led to the introduction of Ronald McDonald. It was these kinds of insights that Cheskin's research gave his clients that helped shape companies' strategies.

Some results of Cheskin and his team's research include:

- The adoption of the spoon on Betty Crocker packages (leading to a doubling of sales)
- The consumer flop of the Edsel automobile was predicted in a legendary article Cheskin wrote before its introduction (triggering Henry Ford to hire him shortly afterward)
- Uncovering the preference of American consumers for circles over triangles on packaging
- Developing the first successful mainstream margarine (Imperial for Unilever)
- The basic market research underlying the introduction of the Ford Mustang and the Lincoln Continental
- The development of the Marlboro Man and Marlboro packaging from what was previously a women's cigarette
- The creation of the Gerber Baby
- Rounding the corners of the Fleishmann's Gin label to appeal more to women (who made up nearly 40% of liquor store shoppers)
- The transformation in the mid-1950s of the Duncan Hines cake mix package toward a more 'colonial' style to reflect American consumers' desire for both newness and tradition
- The retention of the Golden Arches by McDonald's, which he argued "had Freudian applications to the subconscious mind of the consumer and were great assets in marketing McDonald's food", and likened to "mother McDonald's breasts".

Cheskin's approach and successes won respect from corporate leaders at McDonald's, Ford, Polaroid, General Mills, and many others. Henry Ford, Walt Disney, and McDonald's owner Ray Kroc personally engaged Cheskin on the basis of his innovative approach.

One famous Cheskin study involved the testing of identical deodorants in different packages. Samples were mailed to users and told that the formulations were different. However, the only difference between them was their packaging (three different colour schemes). The trials showed that customers preferred one over the others. In fact, some perceived one of the samples as so threatening that they reported rashes and trips to dermatologists, yet had no trouble with the same formula in a different package.

== Imperial margarine ==
In 1940 margarine wasn't popular in the United States. Consumers were not interested in eating or purchasing it and Cheskin was asked to find out why. At that time, though margarine was common, it was not associated with butter because of its texture and colour; it was white instead of yellow. The obvious solution was to add yellow colouring (where the law allowed), but that didn't mean that consumers would find it acceptable. In a truly innovative approach, Cheskin threw luncheons for housewives (sometimes in their homes), using this new colored margarine instead of butter, but not drawing attention to this fact. The luncheons included speakers and the food was only secondary. He asked the women to fill out questionnaires about the speaker, which also asked them to rate the food. By not drawing attention to the margarine and not conducting a typical focus group (which would do just that), Cheskin was able to test this new approach to margarine in a neutral environment.

The results of this technique showed no real differences between people served butter and those served margarine. This conclusion alone was significant for the margarine industry. However, by conducting research indirectly, in the environment where the product would eventually be used (as opposed to a meeting room typical of focus groups), Cheskin lent credibility to the results. In addition, his multi-sensory and experiential approach of creating a full event around the test was truly innovative for the time.

Further tests found ways of transferring the impression of quality, a known concern with this product. By delivering the margarine in blocks the same size as butter, wrapping them in foil, naming the margarine 'Imperial,' and using a crown logo, he was able to create a total experience, through product and packaging, that connoted quality to housewives of the time. Furthermore, when the company proclaimed 'It tastes just like Butter,' they had scientific 'proof' to back this statement up.

== The Marlboro Man ==
Perhaps Cheskin's most famous achievement was turning Marlboro cigarettes into a 'man's' cigarette from its original appeal to women. Because more men than women were smokers, Cheskin convinced Phillip Morris that they would have more success by appealing to men. At the time its unique product differentiation was a red wrapper, to hide lipstick marks. Cheskin's recommendations were to redesign the package to denote masculinity, while keeping the red color. His recommendations underlie everything from the 'Man-Sized Flavor' advertising campaign and the now iconic packaging (resembling a medal), to the masculine and virile Marlboro Man himself. The Marlboro Man sported tattoos to give him a rugged backstory and often appeared as a cowboy on horseback (the predominant image that has survived today).

== Bibliography ==
- Living with Art (1940, 233 pages)
- Colors: What They Can Do for You (1947, 333 pages)
- Notation on a Color System for Planning Color Identification (1949, 18 pages)
- Color for Profit (1951, 164 pages)
- Colours and What They Can Do (1951, 214 pages)
- Color Wheel for Color Planning (1953, 4 pages)
- Color Guide for Marketing Media (1954, 209 pages)
- Cheskin Color Charts (1955, 8 pages)
- How to Predict What People Will Buy (1957, 241 pages)
- Why People Buy: Motivation Research and its Successful Application (1959)
- Basis for Marketing Decision Through Controlled Motivation Research (1961, 282 pages)
- How to Color-Tune Your Home (1962, 203 pages)
- Business Without Gambling: How Successful Marketers Use Scientific Methods (1963, 255 pages)
- Problem-Directed Men: Our Greatest Need in Business and Government (1964, 320 pages)
- Secrets of Marketing Success (1967, 278 pages)
- Marketing Success: How to Achieve It (1972)
- The Cheskin System for Business Success (1973, 250 pages)
