= McDonald's sign (Pine Bluff, Arkansas) =

- McDonald's Store #433 Sign
- U.S. National Register of Historic Places
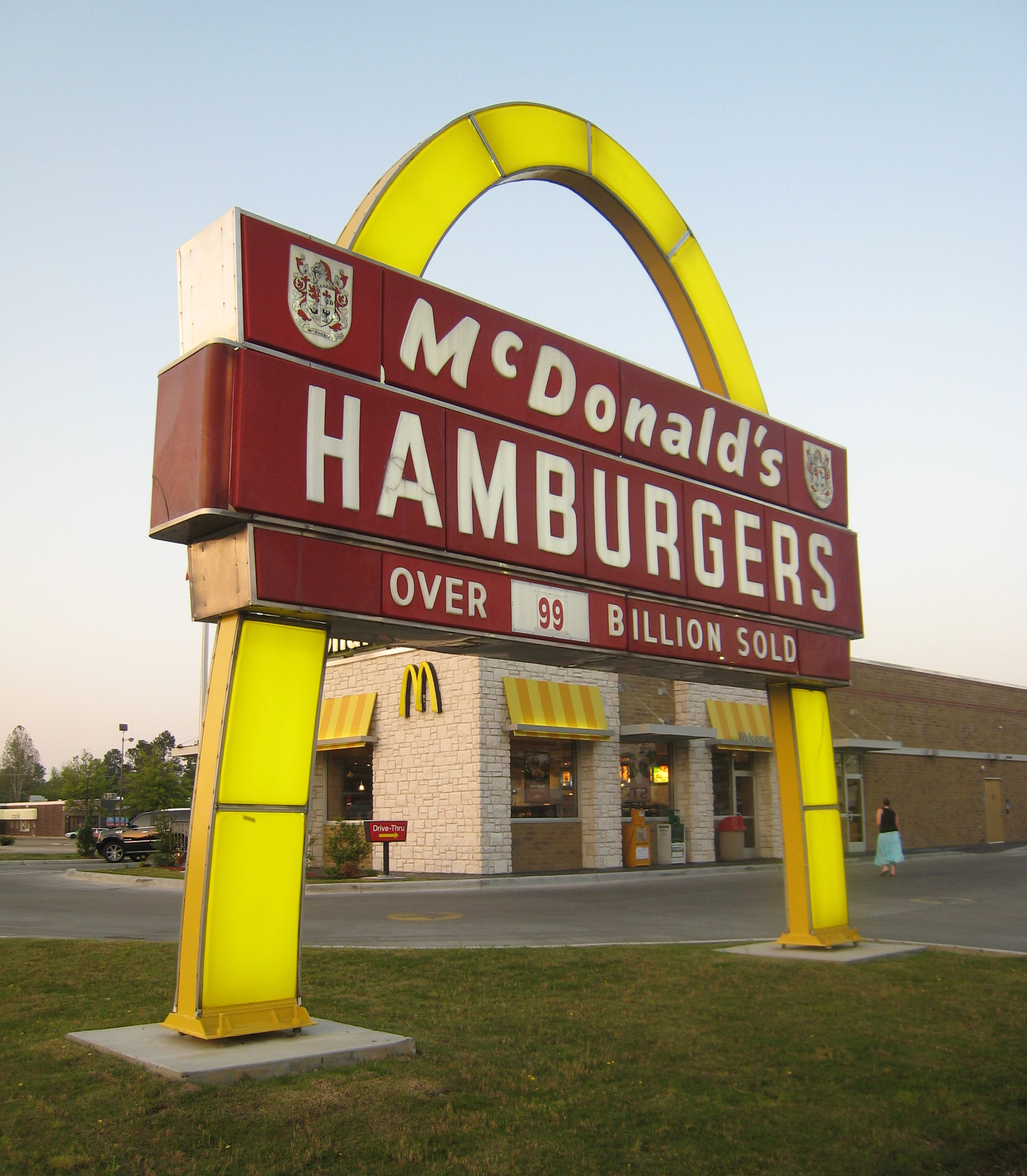

- Location within Arkansas Location within the United States
- Location: 2819 S. Olive St., Pine Bluff, Arkansas
- Coordinates: 34°12′7″N 92°0′24″W
- Area: less than one acre
- Built: c. 1962
- Architectural style: Single-arch McDonald's sign
- NRHP reference No.: 06000411
- Added to NRHP: August 21, 2006

The McDonald's Store #433 Sign in Pine Bluff, Arkansas, is one of only a few surviving examples of a single-arch McDonald's sign. The sign was erected in 1962 and remained at its original location until 2007, when McDonald's Store #433 moved and the sign was renovated and moved to the new location. The McDonald's sign was added to the U.S. National Register of Historic Places in 2006.

== History ==
The neighborhood of South Main Street in Pine Bluff was mostly residential until the mid-20th-century, when commercial enterprises began to appear in the area. In 1962, owner Mike Retzer built McDonald's Store #433 at 1300 South Main Street. The building was the standard corporate design for the era: a red, white and yellow motif with arches projecting through the roof. The restaurant opened on July 3, 1962.

In August 2007, it was announced that the location would close by year's end. A new building was built in the 2800 block of South Olive Street, about two miles from the original location. Initially, it was unknown what the sign's fate would be; by September 2007, it was announced that the sign would move to the new location.

In September, the sign was dismantled and transported to Skylite Sign & Neon in Mabelvale, Arkansas, for renovation work that lasted until the next month.

== Design ==
The McDonald's sign in Pine Bluff represents a transition from the "Speedee" sign to the now-ubiquitous double golden arches. The design was used for one year; rare then, it is far rarer today. The first double golden arches sign appeared just three months after the Pine Bluff store opened.

Typical of the single-arch style from McDonald's early years, the Pine Bluff sign has plastic panels held in a metal frame and red advertising space midway up the sign. The sign was manufactured by Sign Crafters of Evansville, Indiana and the plastic sheeting was made by Rohm & Haas Company of Philadelphia.

Ray Kroc designed the sign after seeing an image of the McDonald family crest. The arch itself evokes modernism. In Orange Roofs, Golden Arches: The Architecture of American Chain Restaurants Phillip Langdon stated the arch was symbolic of a "buoyant spirit: a feeling of skyward momentum, symbolic of an aerospace age in which man could hurtle himself into the heavens." Langdon says the arch was intended to bring a sense of structural modernism to a roadside hamburger stand.

== Historic significance ==
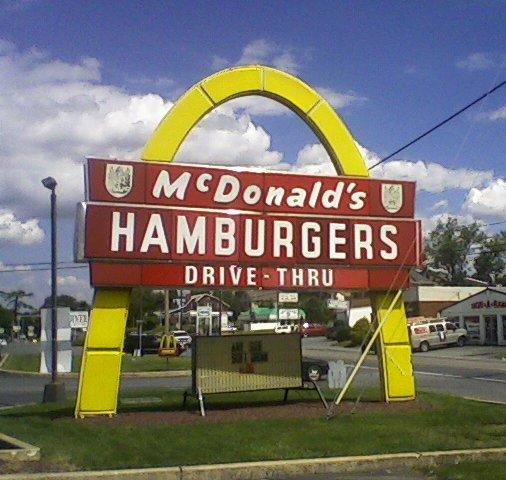
A single-arch McDonald's sign in Lancaster, Pennsylvania, modified to mention the drive-thru, dismantled in 2016

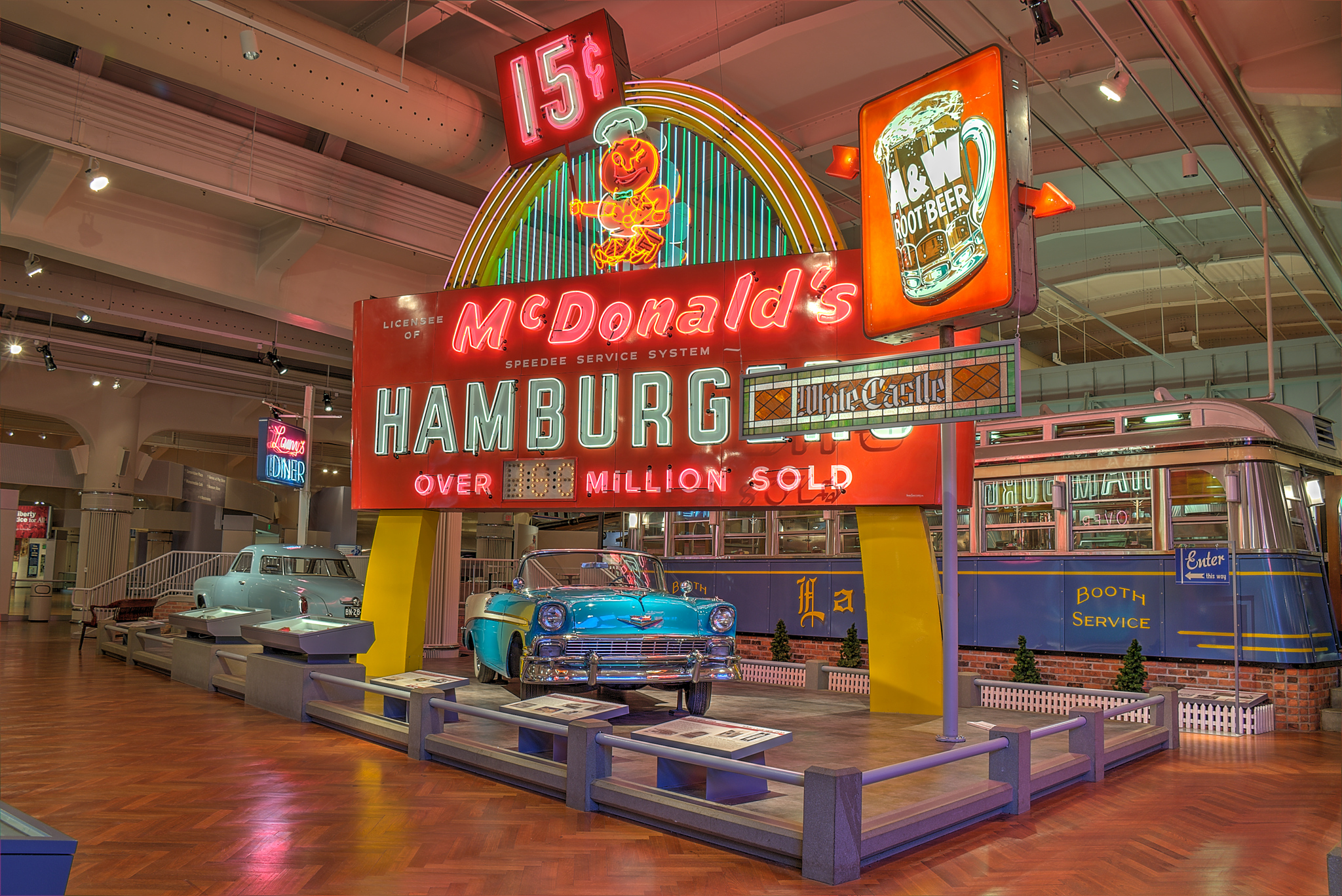
A McDonald's sign on display at the Henry Ford Museum in Dearborn, Michigan

The U.S. National Register of Historic Places added the Pine Bluff McDonald's sign to its listings on August 21, 2006, as McDonald's Store #433 Sign. McDonald's has used a variety of designs for its signs; consequently, early examples are exceedingly rare. The Pine Bluff sign is the only known surviving example of an early single-arch McDonald's sign; it is also a good example of a rare early backlit plastic sign. Backlit plastic signs, popularized after World War II, revolutionized the sign industry through the 1950s and 60s.

It is unclear how many single-arch McDonald's signs still exist. One was in use in Biloxi, Mississippi, when it was destroyed by Hurricane Katrina in 2005. The store on MacArthur Boulevard in Springfield, Illinois, had a single arch until 2006. A single-arch sign at a McDonald's restaurant in Belleville, Illinois, was dismantled and removed when the restaurant closed in 2023. Others exist in Magnolia, New Jersey; Green Bay, Wisconsin; St. Clair Shores, Michigan; Warren, Michigan; Montrose, Colorado; Independence, Missouri; Winter Haven, Florida; and Muncie, Indiana. The Pine Bluff sign is the only one with its own listing on the National Register, though others may be contributing properties within historic districts.

It is likely that most single-arch signs were incorporated into private collections. One such is on display in The Henry Ford museum in Dearborn, Michigan.

== See also ==
- Golden Arches
- National Register of Historic Places listings in Jefferson County, Arkansas
- Oldest McDonald's restaurant in Downey, California
