= St. Simons Island Light =

Lighthouse in Georgia, US

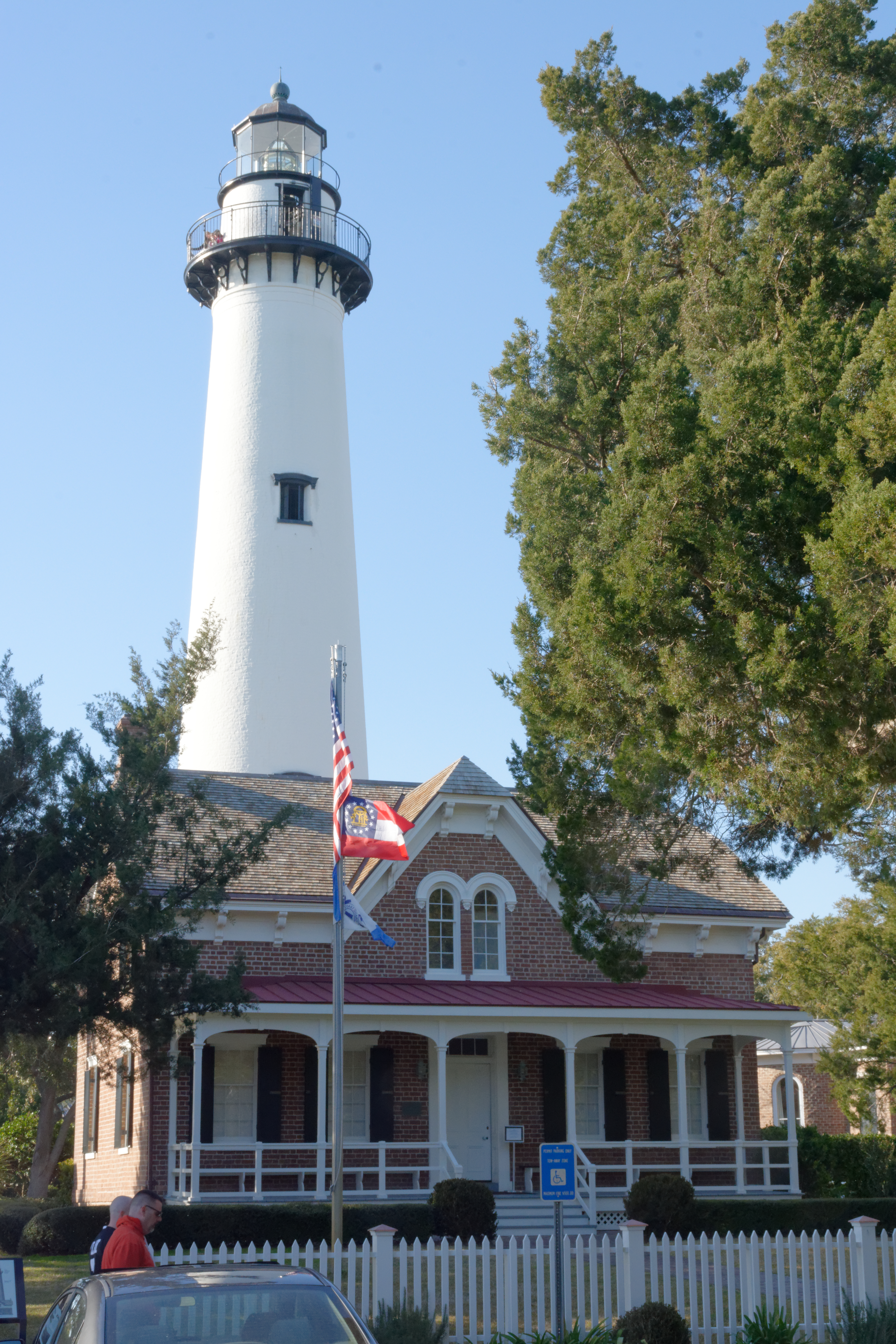
- Lighthouse and keeper's house
- Location: 600 Beachview Dr., St. Simons Island, Georgia
- Coordinates: 31.13411°N 81.39358°W

Tower
- Constructed: 1810
- Foundation: Tabby
- Construction: Iron and brick
- Automated: 1954
- Height: 104 feet (32 m)
- Shape: Frustum of a cone
- Markings: White tower attached to a two-story brick dwelling with red roof
- Heritage: National Register of Historic Places listed place

Light
- First lit: 1872
- Focal height: 32 m (105 ft)
- Lens: Third-order Fresnel lens
- Characteristic: F.Fl W 60s
- St. Simons Lighthouse and Lighthouse Keepers' Building
- U.S. National Register of Historic Places
- U.S. Historic district
- Area: 3.6 acres (1.5 ha)
- Built: 1889
- Architect: Bvt. Gen. O.M. Poe, Charles B. Cluskey
- Architectural style: Gothic, Eclectic
- NRHP reference No.: 72000386
- Added to NRHP: April 13, 1972

The St. Simons Island Light is a lighthouse on the southern tip of St. Simons Island, Georgia, United States. It guides ships into St. Simons Sound and warns of the many sandbars in the area.

== History ==
=== Original structure ===
The original St. Simons Island lighthouse, which was built in 1810, was a 75-foot-tall (23 m) early federal octagonal lighthouse topped by a 10-foot (3.0 m) oil-burning lamp. During the American Civil War, U.S. military forces employed a naval blockade of the coast. An invasion by U.S. Army troops in 1862 forced Confederate soldiers to abandon the area. The retreating troops destroyed the lighthouse to prevent it from aiding the navigation of U.S. Navy warships.

=== Current structure ===
The U.S. government constructed a new lighthouse to replace the original, building it to the west of the original's location. It is a 104-foot (32 m) brick structure completed in 1872 and was outfitted with a third-order, biconvex Fresnel lens. The lens is one of 79 such lenses that remain operational in the United States. Fifteen of these are in use in the Southern United States, of which two are in Georgia. The rotating lens projects four beams of light, with one strong flash every 60 seconds. A cast iron spiral stairway with 129 steps leads to the galley (or watch and service room). In 1876, the lighthouse was overhauled.

In 1934, a 1,000-watt electrical light replaced the kerosene-burning lamp and was fully automated in 1953.

On July 1, 1939, the United States Lighthouse Service was placed under the jurisdiction of the US Coast Guard.

In 1972, the Coast Guard placed rear range lights on two towers at the entrance to the Frederica River off of St. Simons Sound. Entering the entrance channel at sea and proceeding inward, keeping the lighthouse centered between the two rear range lights keeps one in the center of the entrance channel. The lighthouse is, therefore, still an active navigational aid.

In 1972, the lightkeepers' cottage was leased to Glynn County. The Coastal Georgia Historical Society spent three years restoring the two-story Victorian lightkeepers' cottage at the base of the lighthouse, which was then converted into a museum. In 1984, they leased the historic lighthouse structure. For a fee, the public can tour the museum and climb the 129 steps to the top of the lighthouse for a view of St. Simons Sound and the surrounding area.

The tower underwent restoration in 1989–91 and again in 1997–98.

On May 26, 2004, ownership of the lighthouse was transferred to the Coastal Georgia Historical Society under the National Historic Lighthouse Preservation Act.

The light mechanism is maintained by the United States Coast Guard Auxiliary, led by Jeff Cole since 1993.

The St. Simons Lighthouse, along with the northernmost water tower on Jekyll Island, creates the demarcation line that separates St. Simons Sound from the Atlantic Ocean.

The lighthouse is a Picturesque and symbol of St. Simons Island and of Glynn County, Georgia. It is the subject of many paintings and other renderings.

=== 2010 restoration ===
In 2010, the St. Simons Island lighthouse underwent a significant renovation. It was closed to the public for several months while all interior and exterior paint was sandblasted off and then repainted. Eight iron handrail posts at the top of the tower were replaced, having been recast from one of the originals. All ironwork was sandblasted and repaired as needed. During the restoration, great lengths were taken to protect the valuable Fresnel lens. It was bubble wrapped, shrink-wrapped, and finally enclosed in a plywood box. A temporary spotlight attached to the galley of the lighthouse continued to guide ships into the sound while the main light was out of operation.

=== List of head keepers ===
- James Gould (1811–1837)
- Lachlan McIntosh (1837–1852)
- Alexander D. McIntosh (1852–1855)
- John F. Carmon (1855–1861)
- Bradford B. Brunt (1872–1874)
- Frederick Osborne (1874–1880)
- George W. Ashbell (1880–1883)
- Isaac L. Peckham (1883–1892)
- Joseph Champagne (1892–1907)
- Carl O. Svendsen (1907–1935)
- Arthur F. Hodge (1936–1945)
- David O'Hagan (1945–1953)

== Museum ==
The Coastal Georgia Historical Society allows visitors to climb the 129 steps of the lighthouse tower and operates the St. Simons Lighthouse Museum in the 1872 keeper's house.

The Society's headquarters are in the adjacent A. W. Jones Heritage Center, including exhibits, the Society's archives, a research library, an event hall, a museum shop, and administrative offices. The Society also operates the World War II Home Front Museum on St. Simons.

== Image gallery ==
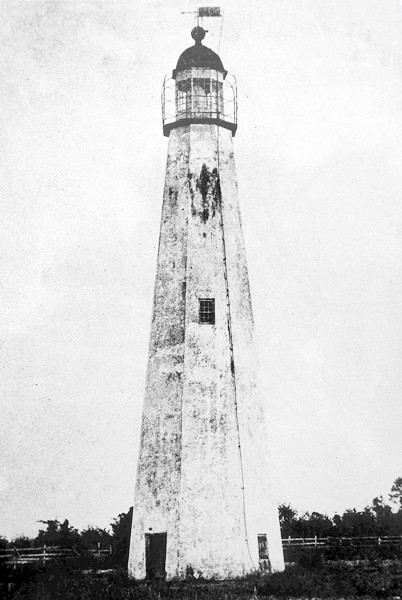
Original lighthouse, in 1848

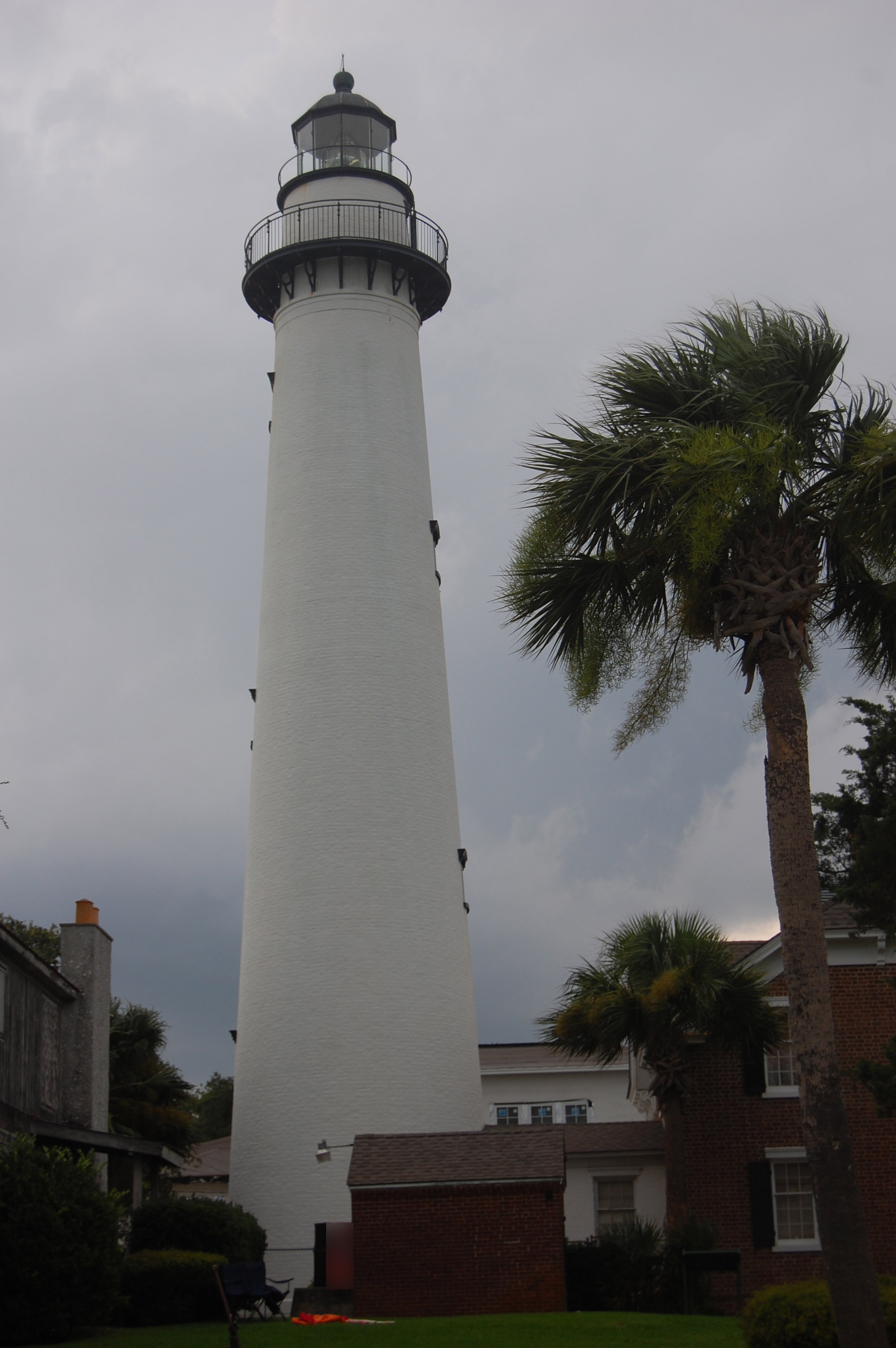
Current lighthouse, in 2008

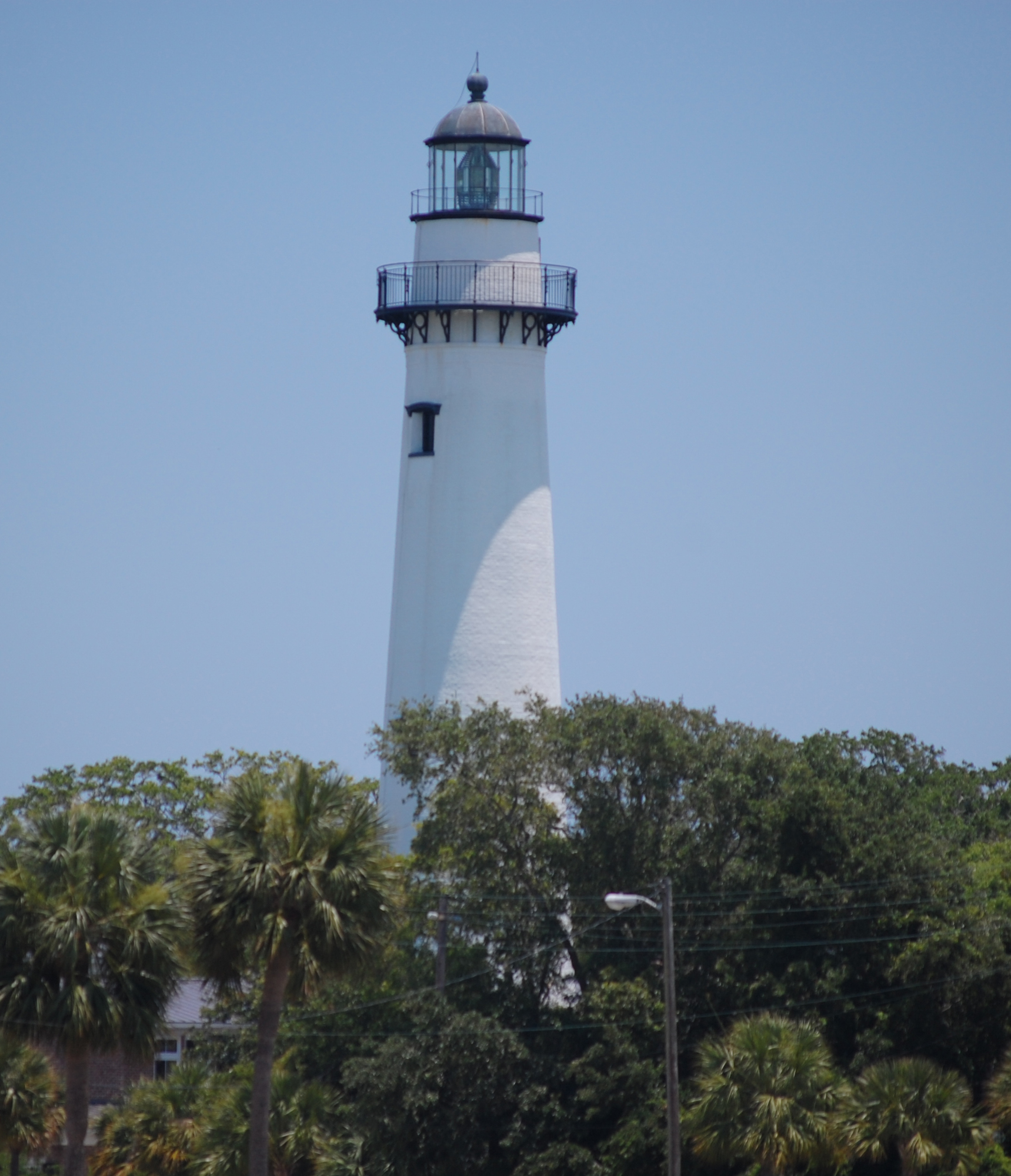
Lighthouse, long view, 2008

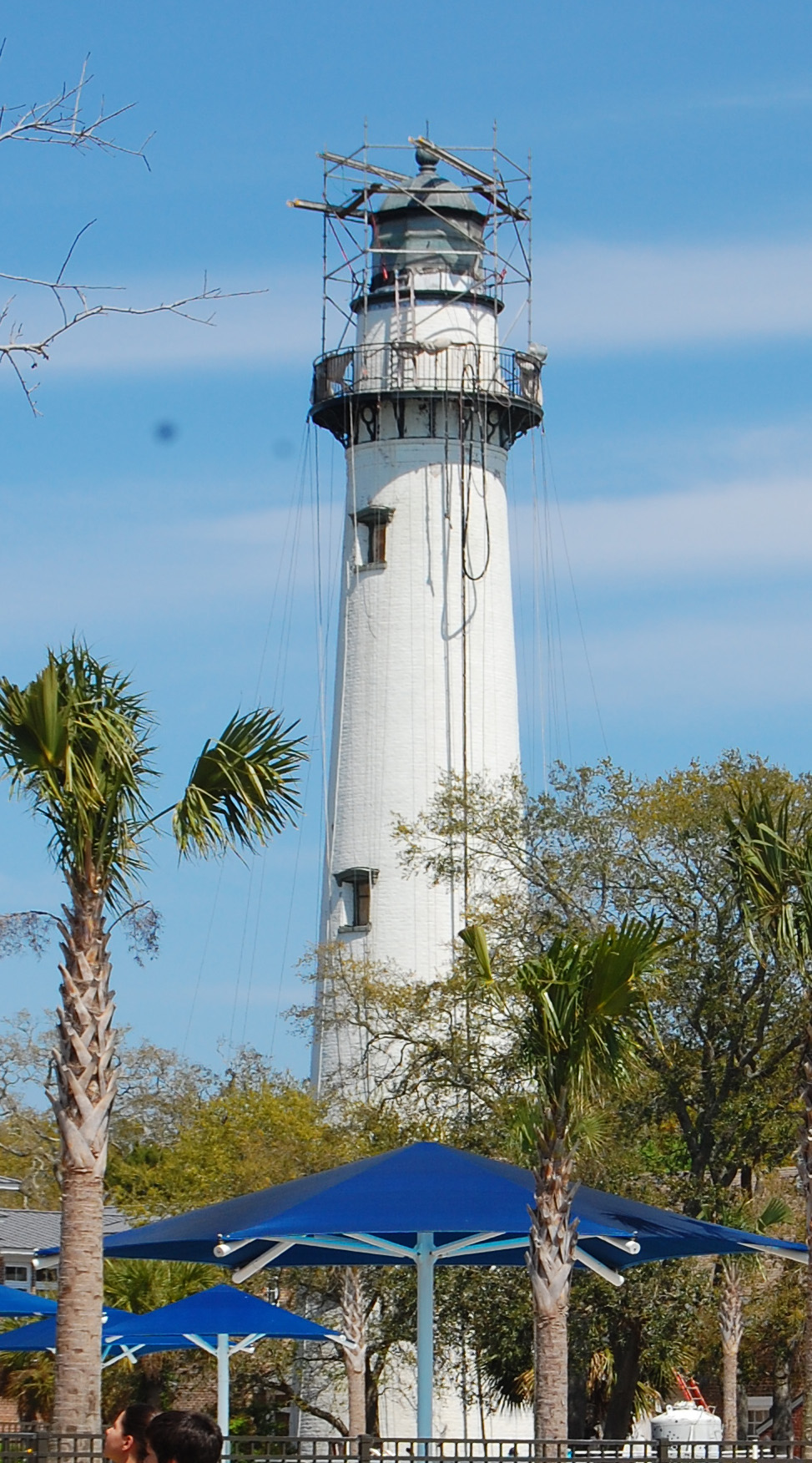
Under restoration, 2010

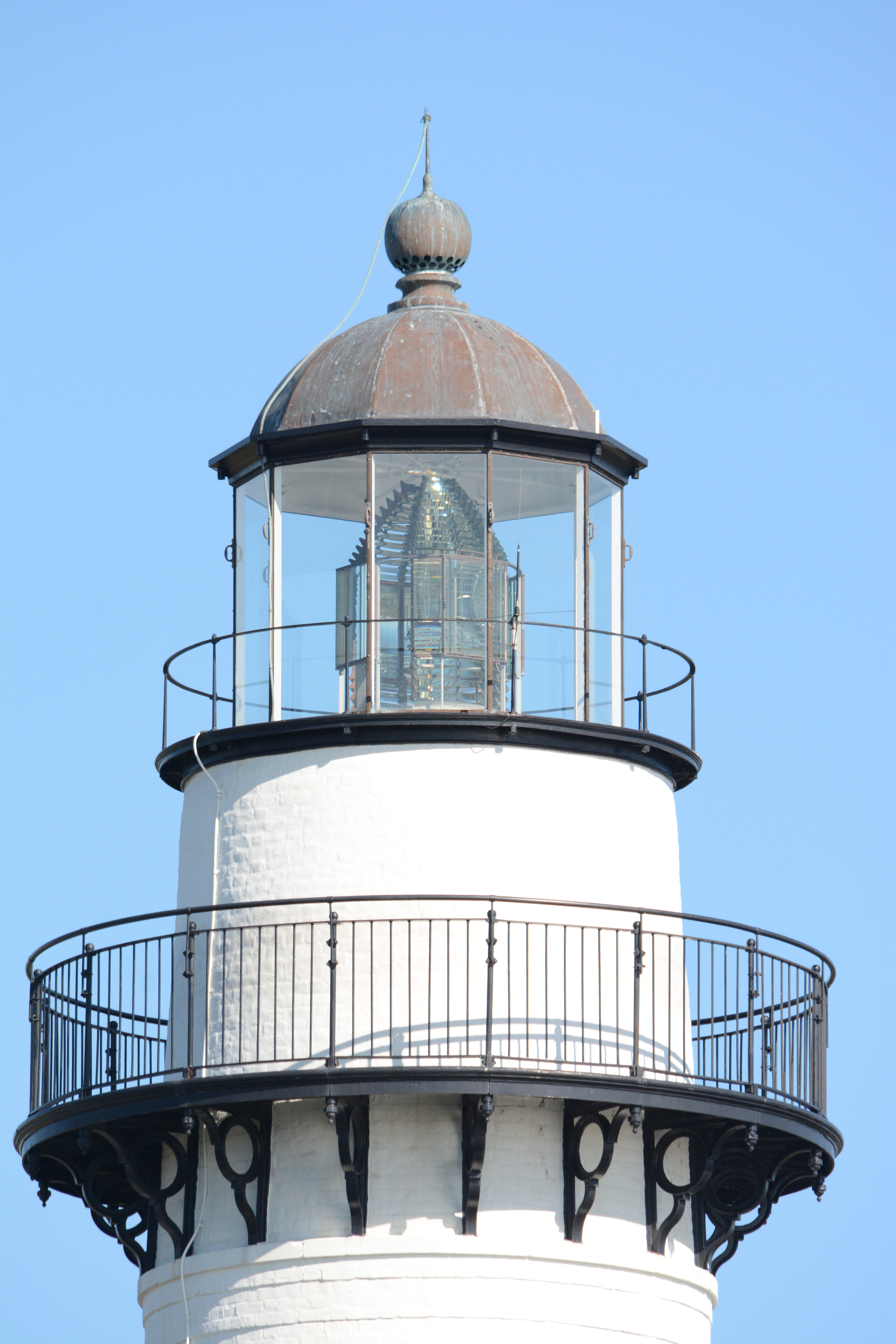
Close-up view of the lantern, 2015
