= East Beach Station =

Historic US Coast Guard station

- US Coast Guard Station--St. Simons Island
- U.S. National Register of Historic Places
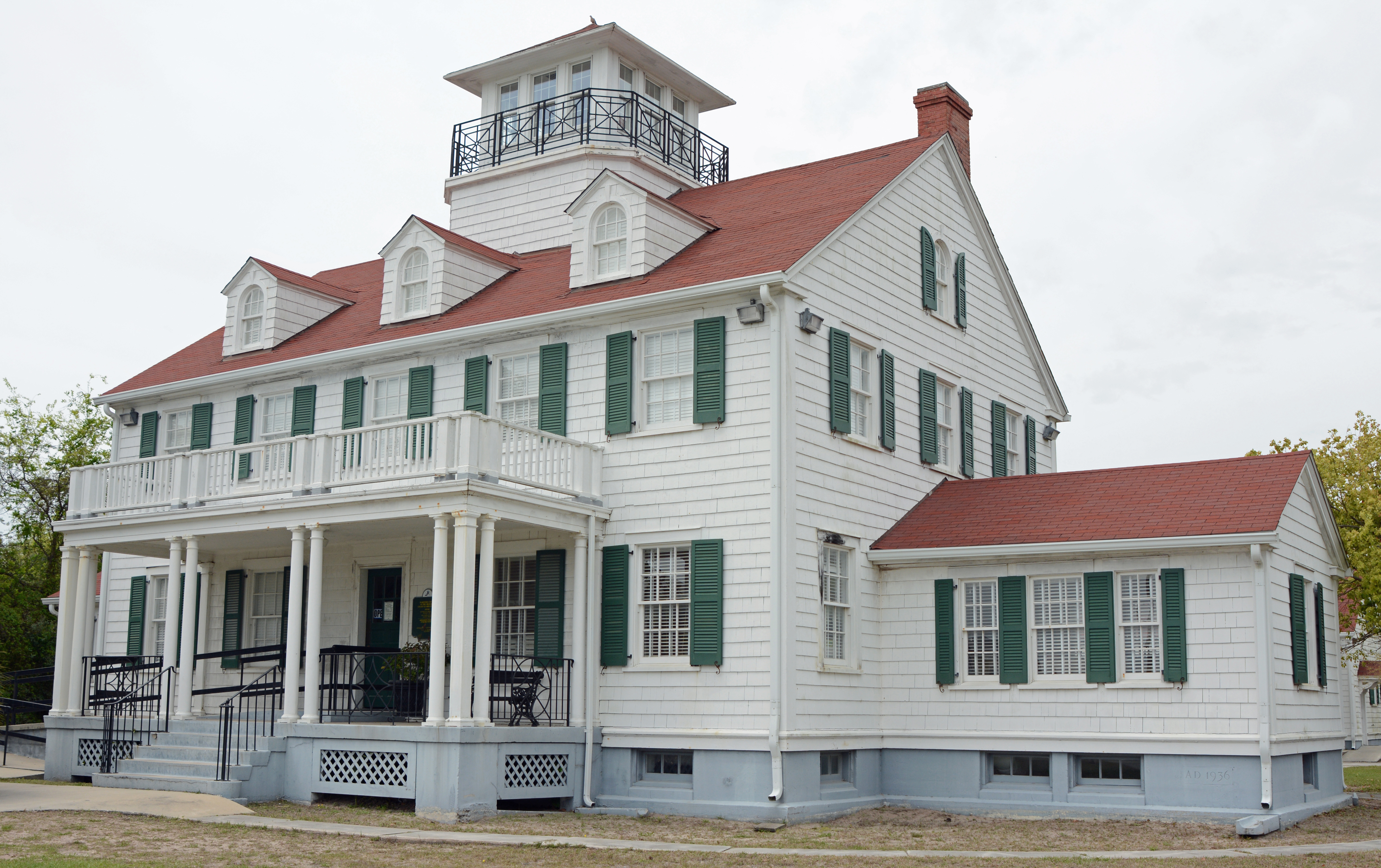
- The Coast Guard Station in 2015

- Location within Georgia
- Location: 4201 First St., St. Simons Island, Georgia
- Coordinates: 31.14562°N 81.37316°W
- Area: 2.5 acres (1.0 ha)
- Built: 1936
- Architect: U.S. Coast Guard Civil Engineer's Office
- Architectural style: Colonial Revival
- NRHP reference No.: 98000297
- Added to NRHP: April 1, 1998

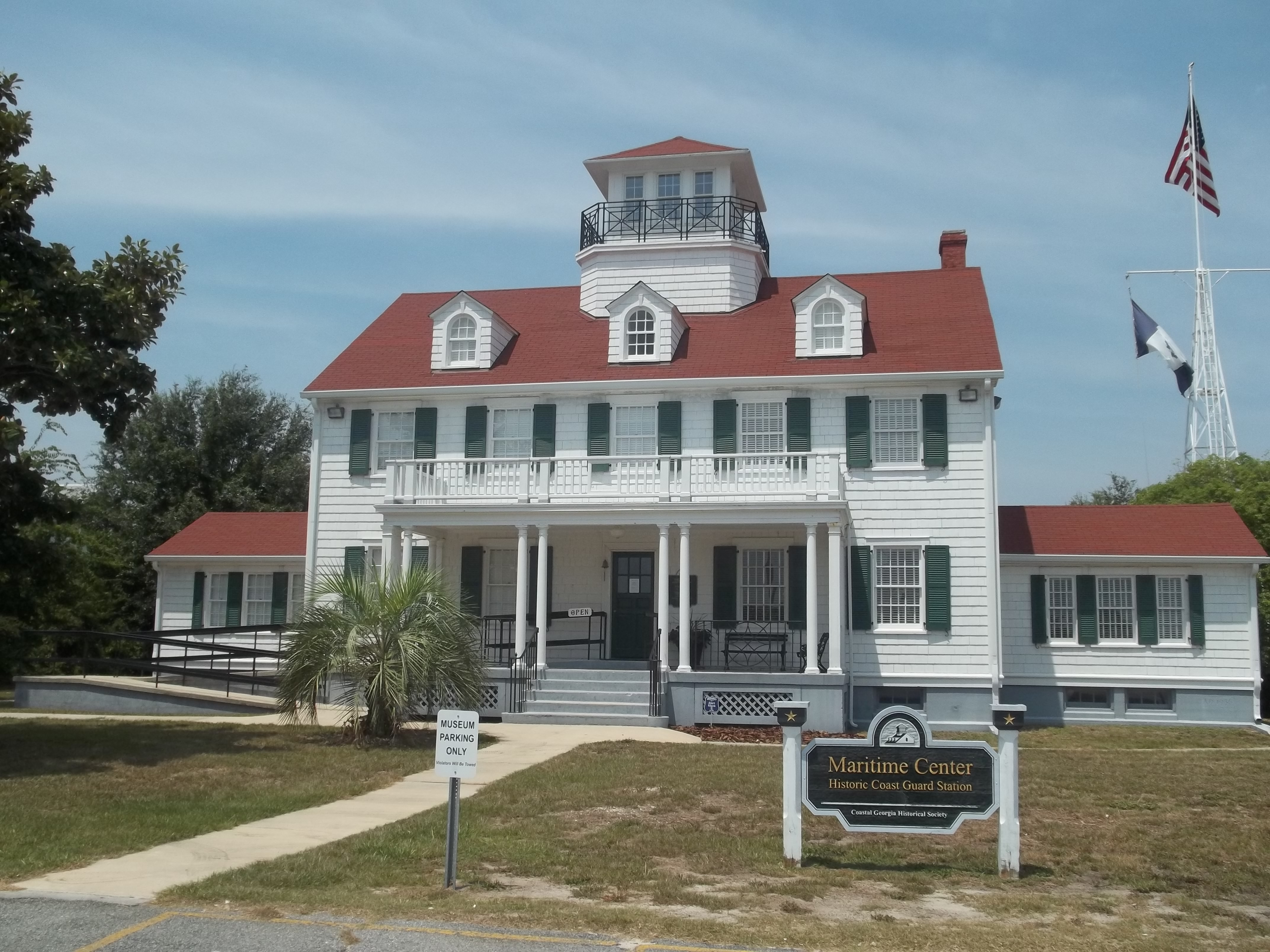
Historic Coast Guard Station

East Beach Station (or US Coast Guard Station-St. Simons Island or Historic Coast Guard Station) is a station of the U.S. Coast Guard in St. Simons, Georgia, United States, located at 4201 1st Street. It was built in 1936 as a part of the Works Progress Administration initiated by President Franklin D. Roosevelt. The Coast Guard Station played a part in World War II when it helped save the crew of two merchant ships, the SS Oklahoma and the Esso Baton Rouge, both tankers. These two ships were torpedoed by a German submarine U-123 on April 8, 1942. The station is one of the forty-five originally built under President Roosevelt, and is one of the few that have survived to this day.

East Beach Station is now operated by the Coastal Georgia Historical Society as the World War II Home Front Museum: Coastal Georgia at War, which brings to life Coastal Georgia's contributions during World War II through the eyes of residents of small communities like Brunswick and St. Simons, in Glynn County.

The Coastal Georgia Historical Society also operates the St. Simons Island Lighthouse and adjacent A. W. Jones Heritage Center on St. Simons Island.

The station was added to the National Register of Historic Places in 1998.
