= Golden Arches =

Symbol of McDonald's (fast-food chain)

The official Golden Arches logo used by McDonald's since 2006

The Golden Arches are the symbol of McDonald's, the global fast-food restaurant chain. Originally, real arches were part of the restaurant design. They were incorporated into the chain's logo in 1962, which resembled a stylized restaurant, and in the current Golden Arches logo, introduced in 1968, resembling an "M" for "McDonald's". They are widely regarded to be one of the most recognizable logos in the world.

== History ==
In 1952, brothers Richard and Maurice McDonald decided they needed a new building to house their hamburger restaurant in San Bernardino, California. They wanted this building to have an entirely new design which would achieve two goals: even greater efficiency, and an eye-catching appearance. They interviewed at least four architects altogether, finally choosing Stanley Clark Meston, an architect practicing in nearby Fontana, in late 1952. The arches had a direct bearing on the interviewing process and their choice of Meston: the first architect they interviewed objected to the arches the brothers wanted; a second wanted to change the arches; a third, prominent Los Angeles architect Douglas Honnold, said that if the brothers were going to tell him what to do they would be better off doing it themselves.

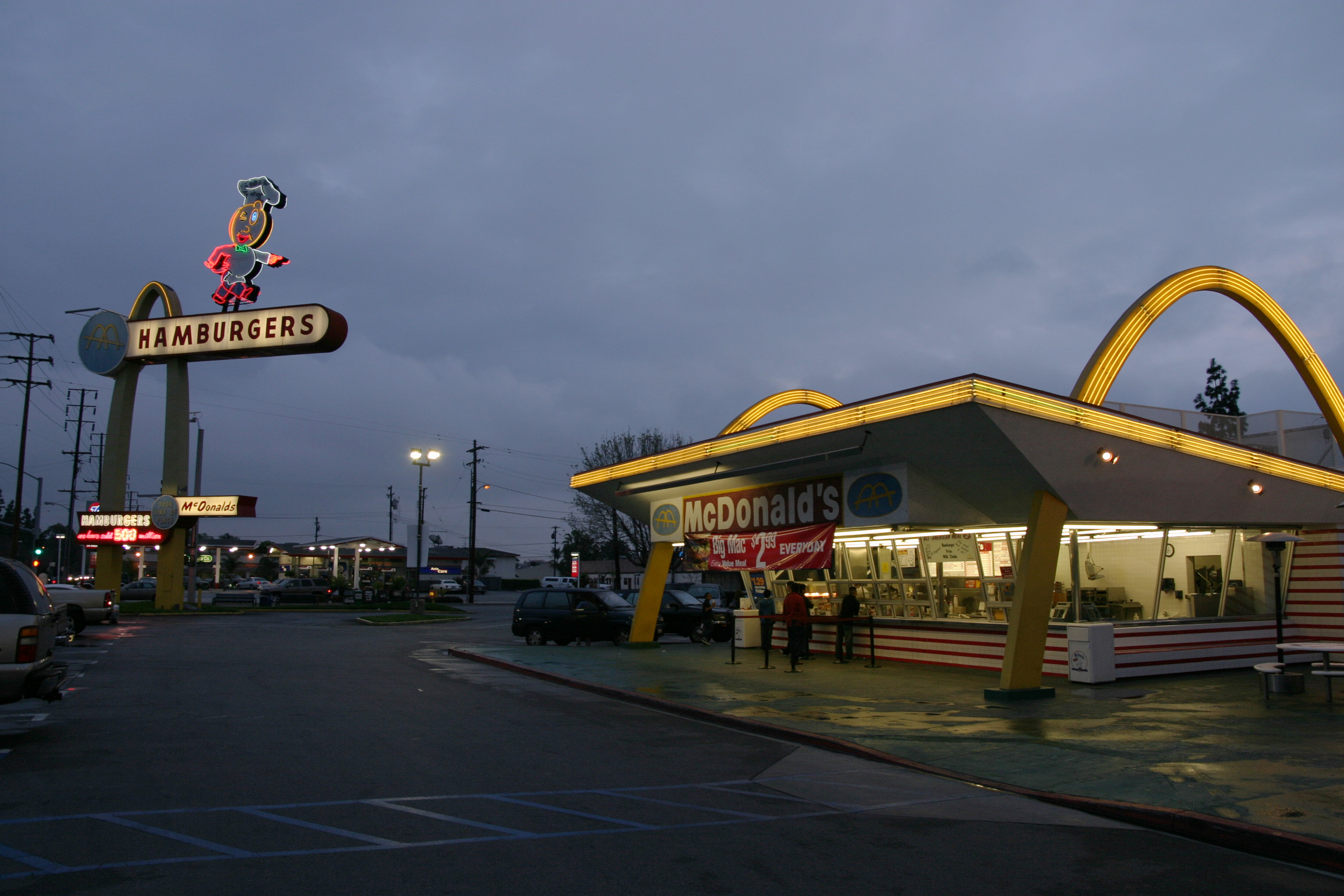
The third McDonald's restaurant to open, located in Downey, California, is the oldest operating McDonald's. It was the second restaurant to feature the Golden Arches design.

Along with their practical knowledge, the brothers brought Meston a rough sketch of two half-circle arches drawn by Richard. The idea of an arch had struck Richard as a memorable shape to make their stand more visible. After considering one arch parallel to the front of the building, he had sketched two half-circles on either side of the stand. Meston, together with his assistant Charles Fish, responded with a design which included two 25-foot (7.6 m) yellow sheet-metal arches trimmed in neon, called "golden arches" even at the design stage. His design also included a third, smaller arch sign at the roadside with a pudgy character in a chef's hat, known as Speedee, striding across the top, trimmed in animated neon.

According to architectural historian Alan Hess, "Meston and Fish turned the crude half-circle suggested by Richard McDonald's sketch into a tapered, sophisticated parabola, with tense, springing lines conveying movement and energy." In the same article Hess added this footnote: "Who first suggested the parabola is unclear. Richard McDonald and George Dexter, the sign contractor who fabricated the first arches, recalled that Dexter came up with the idea and added them to the plans. Charles Fish, who did the working drawings and aided Meston in the design, attributes the idea to his familiarity with the form from a school project in which he used structural parabolas for a hangar. The form was one of many advanced engineering solutions, including folded plate roofs, that were in common currency."

The first franchised outlet bearing Meston's design opened in May 1953 in Phoenix, Arizona. Subsequent franchisees of the McDonald brothers were also required to use Meston's design, although Meston adapted the plans for each to the conditions and building codes of each site.

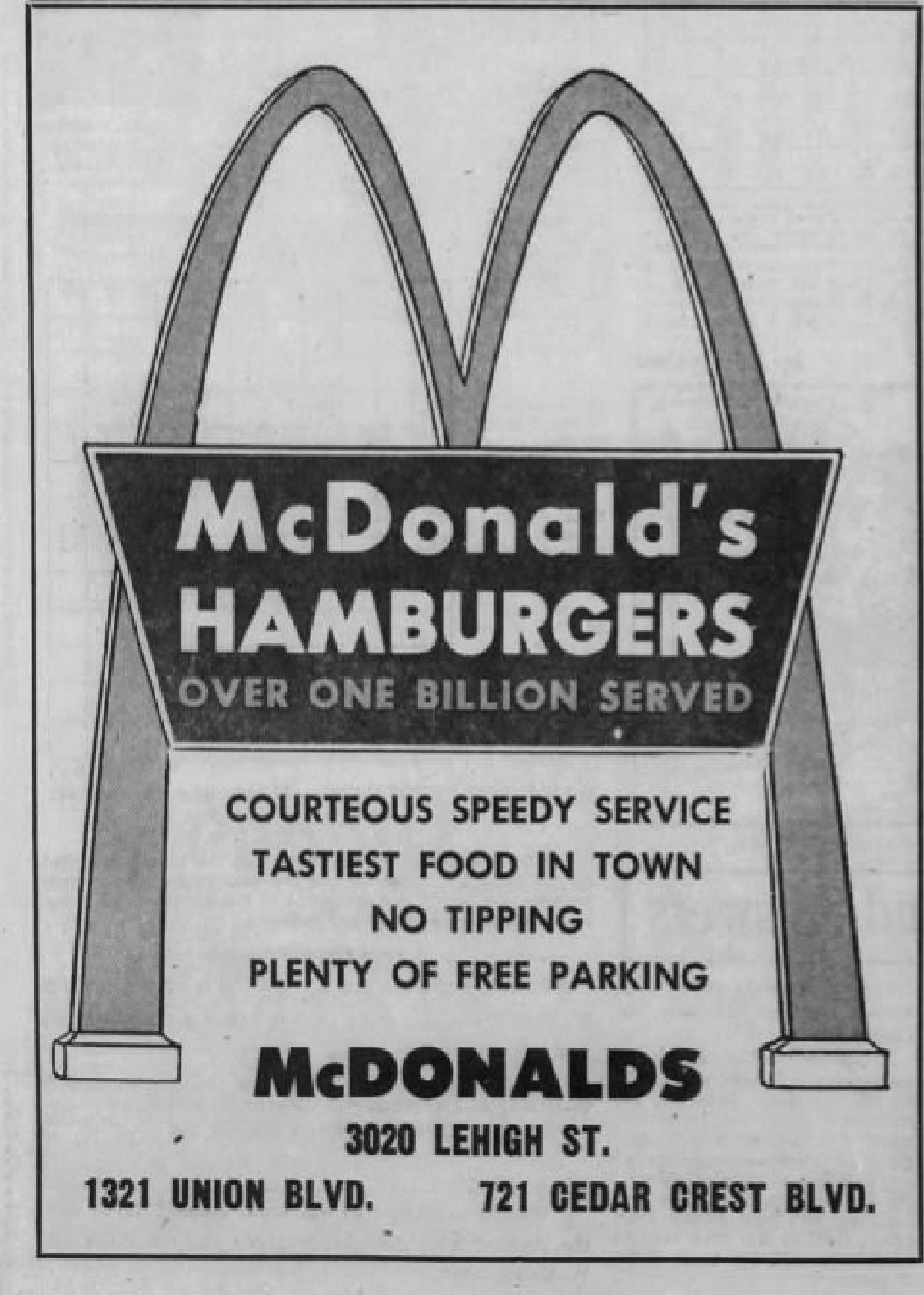
The stylized "M" Golden Arches appear in a 1964 ad in the Morning Call newspaper of Allentown, Pennsylvania.

In 1962, seeking to upgrade its image, the company sought a new logo. Fred Turner sketched a stylized "V", but the company's head of engineering and design, Jim Schindler, extended the "V" into an "M" resembling a McDonald's store viewed from an angle, with a red isosceles trapezoid "roof" serving as background for lettering.

While McDonald's dropped the physical arches from nearly all of its restaurants in the 1960s, the Golden Arches have remained in the logo, and as a commonly understood term for the company. This was partially due to Louis Cheskin's argument that the arches, which he likened to "mother McDonald's breasts", had "Freudian applications to the subconscious mind of the consumer and were great assets in marketing McDonald's food".

Alan Hess summarized the arch's origin in Googie architecture and ultimate significance as follows:

The arch was conceived by businessman Richard McDonald, an untrained designer with no knowledge of erudite architectural examples. His intent was pragmatic: to be noticed. This determined its scale, position, and simple shape visible over long distances following the precedent of earlier drive-ins with which he was familiar. To McDonald, the arch was an arbitrary form, without symbolic or historic associations, which he hoped would come to symbolize McDonald's. The arches' position implies no traditional use of the arch as an entry, nor are they structural. The architect delineated this formal concept determined by the client in the energetic lines and machine-like surfaces of a popular commercial vernacular style current in the 1940s and 1950s ... Meston's design proved successful as design and icon because of, not in spite of, its commercialism.

== Variations ==
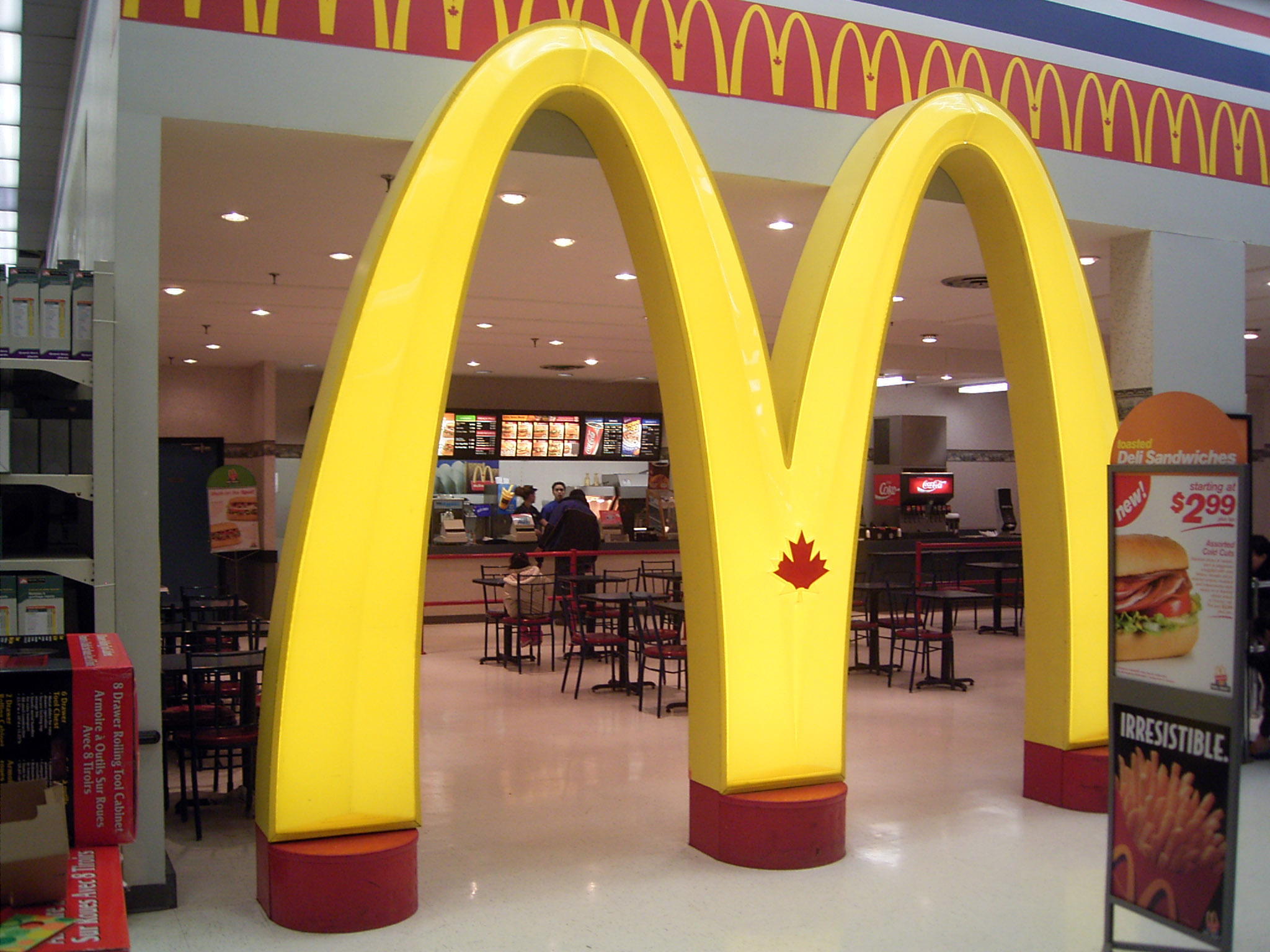
A McDonald's in Canada with Golden Arches featuring a maple leaf

All restaurants operated by McDonald's Canada use a variation of the Golden Arches, which features a maple leaf inserted into the centre of the Golden Arches; subsuming a Canadian national symbol into its corporate symbol.

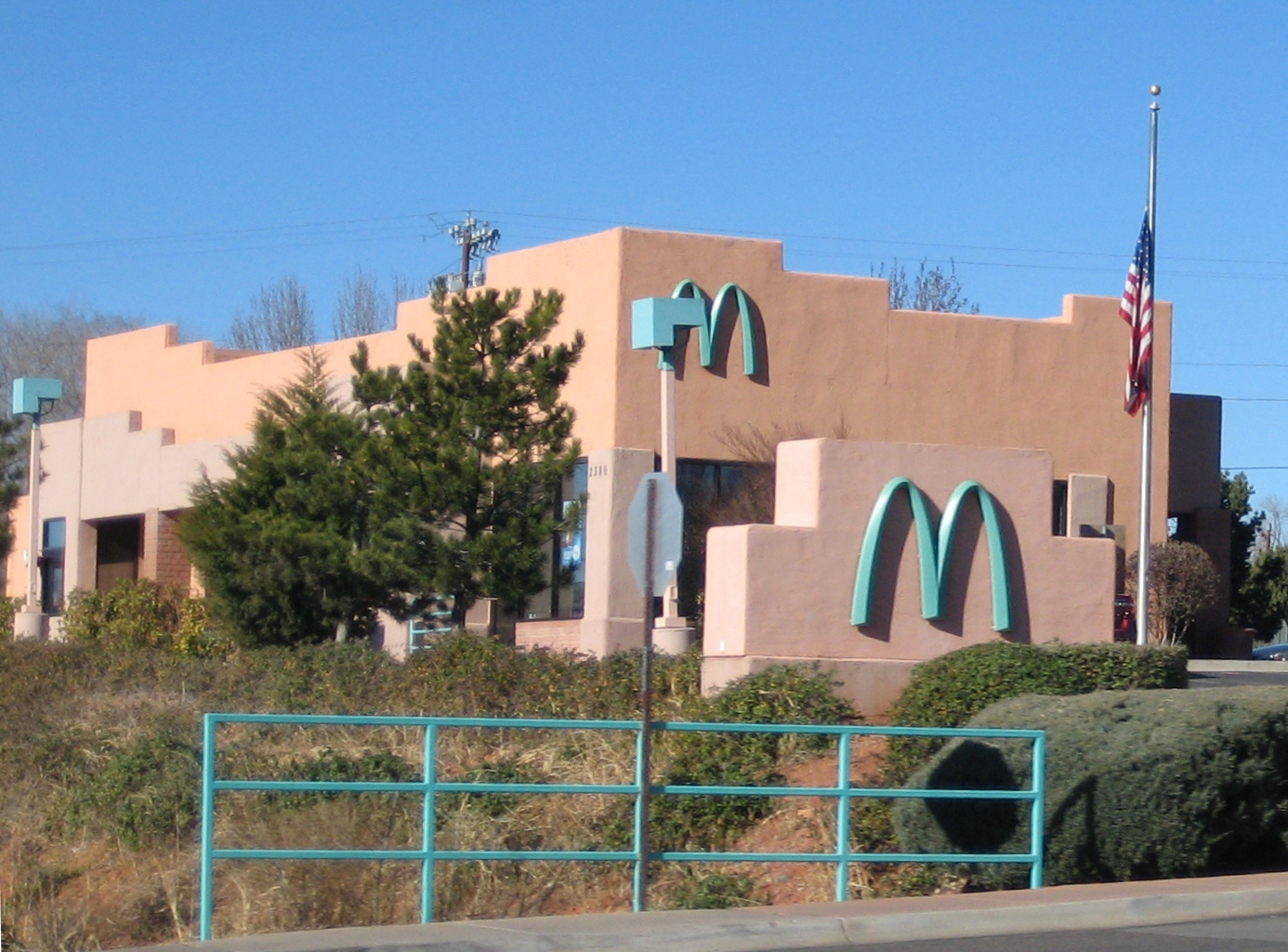
Turquoise Golden Arches at a McDonald's in Sedona, Arizona

The McDonald's arches in Sedona, Arizona, were made turquoise when the yellow color had been deemed by government officials to be contrasting too much against the scenic red rock.

As of 2019, seven McDonald's signs only have one arch, including locations in Magnolia, New Jersey; Winter Haven, Florida; Montrose, Colorado; and the McDonald's sign in Pine Bluff, Arkansas.

The McDonald's restaurant at 610 Del Monte Ave., Monterey, California, has black arches.

The McDonald's in North Scottsdale, Arizona, on 18241 N Pima Rd also has black arches.

The McDonald's restaurant at 2172 Sunset Blvd. in Rocklin, California, has dark red arches.

The restaurant at Champs-Elysées in Paris, France, includes a neon McDonald's sign with white arches. A McDonald's in Bruges, Belgium, has white arches. In late 2026 or early 2027, a McDonalds located within F.C. Copenhagen's home ground, Parken Stadium, opens and will have white arches. This change was a mandatory requirement from the club as the colours of their archrivals Brøndby IF, are yellow.

In 2017, McDonald's China Division was renamed to Golden Arches while keeping the restaurant's name as McDonald's. McDonald's spokesperson explained that the rename was due to McDonald's Corporation sold bulk of its China Division to CITIC Group and Carlyle Capital.

In 2018 and again in 2019, McDonald's turned the arches upside down on its social media accounts in celebration of International Women's Day, changing the "M" to a "W". A McDonald's franchise operated by Patricial Williams in Lynwood, California, also flipped the arches on its sign. This prompted a mild backlash, with some arguing that the move was hypocritical due to the chain's underpaying of employees, and others observing that the "M" in the logo could just as easily stand for "men" as it could for "McDonald's".

== Influence ==
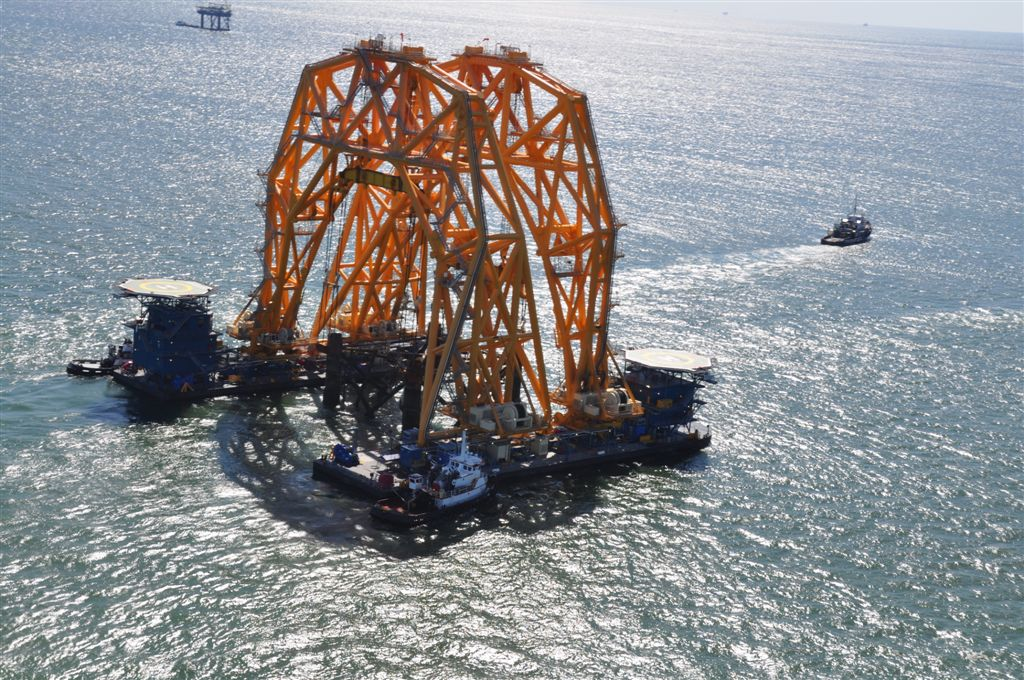
VB-10,000

The term "Golden Arches" is sometimes used as metonym, symbolizing capitalism and globalization. In phrases such as the "Golden Arches Theory of Conflict Prevention" from 1996, it was once asserted, "No two countries that both have a McDonald's have ever fought a war against each other." The Golden Arches are used as McDonald's is one of the more prominent American corporations that have become global in their reach (along with Coca-Cola and Nike).

The shape and color of the prominent space frame trusses used in the heavy-lift ship VB-10,000 have led some to nickname it the "Golden Arches". The Irish rock band U2 incorporated a 100-foot (30-meter) yellow, fibreglass parabolic arch into the set of their PopMart Tour of 1997–98, acting as a support structure for the centralized public address (PA) system, in reference to the McDonald's logo. Set designer Willie Williams recalled frontman Bono having a "secret fantasy to play a show underneath a set of gigantic golden arches".
