= St. Simons Sound =

Coordinates: 31°07′43″N 81°24′54″W

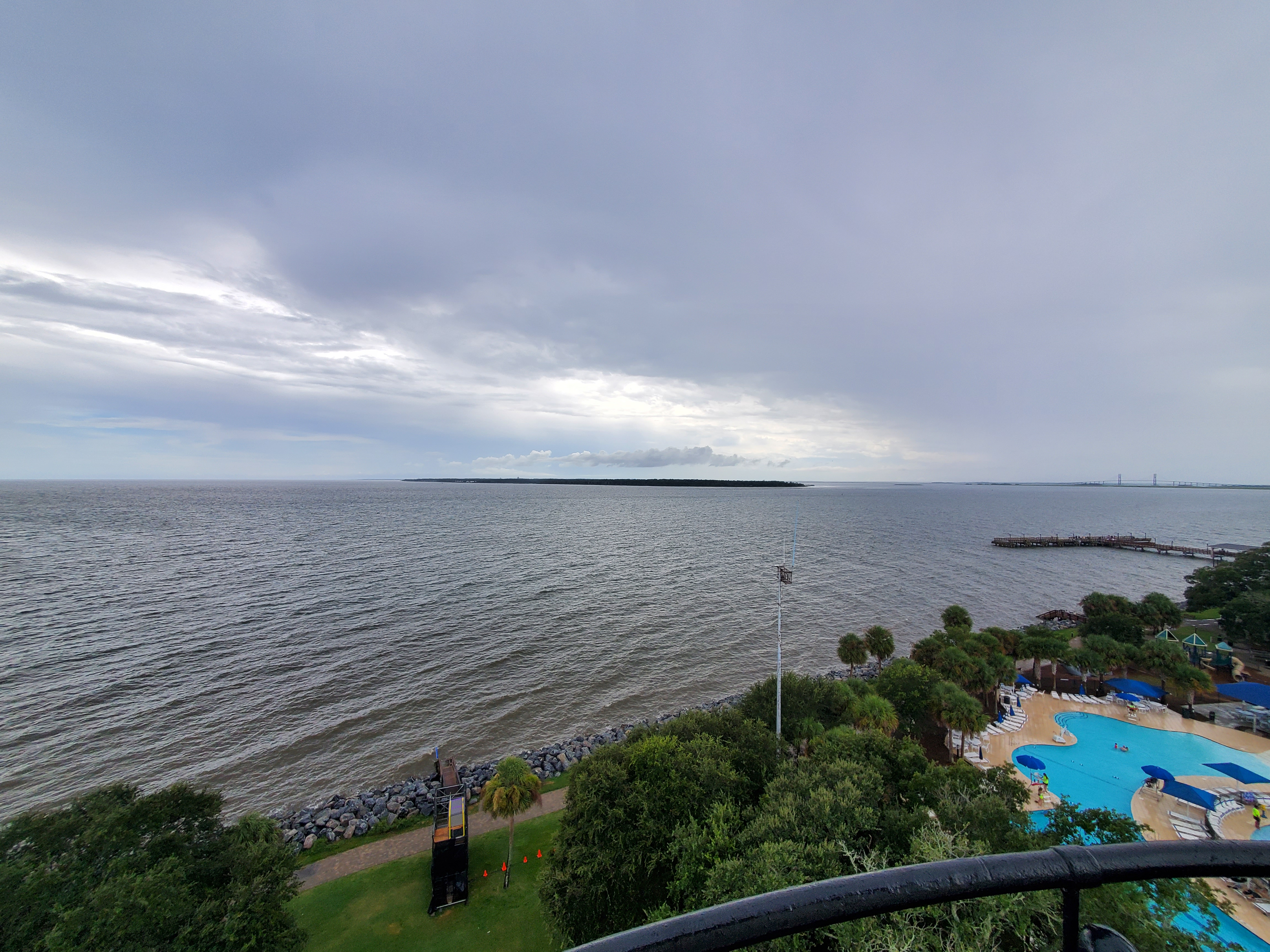
The sound as seen from the top of the St. Simons Island Light on St. Simons Island. Facing south, Jekyll Island is visible in the immediate background, while the Sidney Lanier Bridge is visible in the far-right background.

St. Simons Sound is a sound in Georgia that prevails between Jekyll Island and St. Simons Island. It is part of the waterway from the Atlantic Ocean to the South Brunswick River to the port at Brunswick, Georgia. The St. Simons lighthouse stands on the north side of the sound. The depth of the sound is determined to be 32 feet (9.8 m) through a channel of treacherous shoals.
