= The Founder =

2016 film by John Lee Hancock

- Theatrical release poster
- Directed by: John Lee Hancock
- Written by: Robert Siegel
- Produced by: Don Handfield; Jeremy Renner; Aaron Ryder
- Starring: Michael Keaton; Nick Offerman; John Carroll Lynch; Linda Cardellini; B. J. Novak; Laura Dern
- Cinematography: John Schwartzman
- Edited by: Robert Frazen
- Music by: Carter Burwell
- Production companies: FilmNation Entertainment; The Combine; Faliro House Productions S.A.; Arcos Dorados Holdings, Inc.
- Distributed by: The Weinstein Company (United States); Spentzos Film (Greece)
- Release dates: December 7, 2016 (Arclight Hollywood); January 20, 2017 (United States); February 23, 2017 (Greece)
- Running time: 115 minutes
- Countries: United States; Greece
- Language: English
- Budget: $7–25 million
- Box office: $24.1 million

The Founder is a 2016 biographical drama film directed by John Lee Hancock and written by Robert Siegel. Starring Michael Keaton as businessman Ray Kroc, the film depicts the story of his creation of the McDonald's fast-food restaurant chain, which eventually involved forcing out the company's founders to take control of the company and begin operation under a profit-focused business model. Nick Offerman and John Carroll Lynch co-star as McDonald's founders Richard and Maurice McDonald, alongside Linda Cardellini as Ray Kroc's third wife Joan Smith, and B. J. Novak as McDonald's president and chief executive Harry J. Sonneborn.

The film premiered at Arclight Hollywood on December 7, 2016, and was released theatrically in the United States on January 20, 2017, by the Weinstein Company. It grossed $24 million worldwide and received generally positive reviews from critics, who praised the performances of Keaton and Offerman.

== Plot ==
In 1954, struggling Prince Castle salesman Ray Kroc travels to San Bernardino, California to meet Dick and Mac McDonald at their eponymous restaurant after the brothers purchase eight of his milkshake machines. Kroc lauds the brothers' success over dinner. Mac and Dick explain the restaurant's origins and success after a complete redesign of the store in 1948, eliminating unnecessary overhead and cutting costs. Eager to cash in, Kroc presses the brothers to expand franchising. After an initial refusal, the brothers agree to a business deal with stringent contract terms and a lengthy approval process for potential changes.

Kroc breaks ground in Des Plaines, putting up his home as collateral. Hungry for more growth, Kroc pursues wealthy local connections for investment in franchising and recruits Fred L. Turner as his business partner. After early struggles with franchise operators not being involved, which had doomed the brothers' previous franchise attempts, Ray hit on the model of the local operator: putting the franchisee directly into the workspace and working alongside their staff. Kroc sees rapid gains and continues to expand, traveling to St. Paul to oversee the first opening in the Twin Cities. There, Kroc meets Rollie Smith, and his wife, Joan, who are interested in franchising; Kroc immediately becomes infatuated with Joan. At the same time, Kroc is stressed out over rising pressure from financial operating costs and falls behind on his payments. Kroc is unsuccessful at renegotiating his contract with the McDonald brothers, and, when his bank forecloses on his home, Kroc's wife, Ethel, discovers her husband put the house up as collateral without her knowledge. Kroc subsequently files for divorce from Ethel.

Kroc visits his bank for help with his lease terms and is approached by former Tastee-Freez Finance VP Harry Sonneborn, who offers to review Kroc's books. Sonneborn explains to Ray that the business operator model will fail under the restrictions imposed by the McDonald brothers' contract terms. Sonneborn guides Kroc towards the evolution of McDonald's into a real-estate model with financial investor backing. In 1955, Franchise Realty Corporation is incorporated and begins an aggressive expansion of the McDonald's franchise. When the brothers are informed of the new company and Kroc's intent to buy the land, Dick and Mac are taken aback, but are powerless against the power Kroc now has. Emboldened, Kroc approaches his attorney for help getting out of his contract and implements further changes to the franchises without Dick and Mac's approval, including the introduction of a powdered milkshake mix to reduce costs. When Kroc officially rebrands Franchise Realty Corporation as the McDonald's Corporation, Mac collapses from diabetic shock and is hospitalized. Kroc visits the brothers at the hospital and offers them a blank check to buy them out.

Realizing that Kroc can't be defeated, the brothers agree to sell for $2.7 million, the rights to the San Bernardino location and 1% of future profits. Kroc agrees to their terms except for the future profits and offers to pay these under a handshake agreement. The brothers reluctantly agree, and Kroc becomes the sole owner of the McDonald's Corporation. Dick asks Kroc why he didn't just take the idea and run with it. Kroc admits that he always wanted the restaurant for himself because of the brothers' last name. He laments his own Slavic last name as not "American" enough for American consumers, while McDonald's represents American values. The brothers are forced to change the name of their original location, and Kroc begins construction of a new McDonald's immediately across the street in San Bernardino.

In 1970, Kroc, now married to Joan, prepares for a public speech that California Governor Ronald Reagan will attend. He heavily plagiarizes a speech he listened to earlier, arguing his success came from persistence.

An epilogue reveals several facts about the company: Kroc's secretary, June Martino, became a part owner in the McDonald's Corporation. Sonneborn was made president and CEO but quit after falling out with Kroc a few years later, never speaking of McDonald's again for the rest of his life. Turner succeeded Kroc as senior chairman, expanding the company worldwide. Kroc and Joan remained married until Kroc's death in 1984. Kroc's San Bernardino McDonald's drove the McDonald brothers' original restaurant out of business in a few years. Kroc did not honor his handshake deal―the McDonald brothers were never paid their royalties, which would eventually have been over $100 million a year. McDonald's feeds about 1% of the world's population every day.

== Cast ==
- Michael Keaton as Ray Kroc
- Nick Offerman as Richard "Dick" McDonald
- John Carroll Lynch as Maurice "Mac" McDonald
- Linda Cardellini as Joan Smith
- B. J. Novak as Harry J. Sonneborn
- Laura Dern as Ethel Kroc
- Justin Randell Brooke as Fred Turner
- Kate Kneeland as June Martino
- Patrick Wilson as Rollie Smith
- Griff Furst as Jim Zien
- Wilbur Fitzgerald as Jerry Cullen
- Afemo Omilami as Mr. Merriman

== Production ==
=== Development ===
The screenplay for The Founder was written by Robert Siegel, based on Ray Kroc's autobiography and an unauthorized biography. According to early reports, the film was to be developed in the same vein as There Will Be Blood and The Social Network. According to Deadline Hollywood, it was ranked the 13th-best unproduced script of 2014. In December 2014, John Lee Hancock was signed to direct the film.

=== Casting ===
In February 2015, Michael Keaton was signed to the role of Ray Kroc. Laura Dern joined the film on May 11, 2015, to play Kroc's wife Ethel Fleming, whom Kroc divorced in 1961. The next day, it was announced that Nick Offerman joined the film, set to play Richard "Dick" McDonald. On May 28, 2015, it was announced that B. J. Novak joined the film as Kroc's financial consultant, Harry J. Sonneborn. On June 9, 2015, it was reported that Linda Cardellini had joined the film, and on June 26, 2015, it was announced that John Carroll Lynch and Patrick Wilson had also been cast.

=== Filming ===
Principal photography for the film began in Newnan, Georgia on June 1, 2015. Production designer Michael Corenblith had previously worked on films including Apollo 13, Saving Mr. Banks and The Blind Side in which attention to historic detail was important. Corenblith worked from archival photos, training films, materials provided by the McDonald family, blueprints obtained from eBay, and research at the oldest McDonald's restaurant in Downey, California. The McDonald brothers' original octagonal San Bernardino restaurant was built in Newnan in the parking lot of the Coweta County administration building.

After a month of searching for a suitable location, an old-style McDonald's building set with the "golden arches" was constructed in a church parking lot in seven working days in Douglasville, Georgia. The set included working and period-accurate kitchen equipment that was brought up to current code. Rearrangement of exterior features such as parking lot striping allowed that set to serve as each franchise location portrayed in the film. Both interior and exterior portions of the restaurant were modular, allowing countertops or entire wall-sized glass panes to be removed to make room for cameras and other equipment.

Filming also took place on location at the Canton Theatre in Historic Downtown Canton, Georgia.

The J. Mack Robinson College of Business Administration Building in downtown Atlanta, which houses a Bank of America branch, served as the Illinois First Federal Savings & Loan Association building. Some interior sets were built on soundstages at EUE Screen Gems Studios in Atlanta. Atlanta's East Lake Golf Club served as Rolling Green Country Club in the film.

== Release ==
On March 2, 2015, The Weinstein Company paid $7 million for the film's distribution rights. On March 26, 2015, the studio set the film for a November 25, 2016 release date. In March 2016, the film was moved up to August 5, 2016. On July 13, 2016, the film's release date was delayed until a limited December 16, 2016 date, followed by a wide release on January 20, 2017. The film eventually opened in the United States at Arclight Hollywood on December 7, 2016, in order to qualify for the 2017 Oscars.

In February 2017 FilmNation Entertainment, one of the film's production companies, sued The Weinstein Company for $15 million. The Weinstein Company released Gold on January 27, 2017, a week after The Founder, which FilmNation claimed was a breach of contract, saying the two companies had an agreement that no Weinstein Company film would be released within a week before or after The Founder. On November 17, 2017, the case was discontinued with prejudice, with both parties' counsel agreeing to the dissolution of the lawsuit.

== Reception ==
=== Box office ===
The Founder grossed $12.8 million in the United States and Canada and $11.3 million in other territories, for a worldwide total of $24.1 million.

In North America, the film was expected to gross $3 million from 1,115 theaters in its opening weekend. It ended up earning $3.8 million, finishing 9th at the box office. In its second week the film made $2.6 million, a drop of 23.4%.

=== Critical response ===
On review aggregator Rotten Tomatoes, the film has an approval rating of 80% based on 246 reviews, with an average rating of 7/10. The website's critical consensus reads, "The Founder puts Michael Keaton's magnetic performance at the center of a smart, satisfying biopic that traces the rise of one of America's most influential businessmen – and the birth of one of its most far-reaching industries." On Metacritic, the film holds a weighted average score 66 out of 100, based on 47 critics, indicating "generally favorable reviews". Audiences polled by CinemaScore gave the film an average grade of "B+" on an A+ to F scale.

Rolling Stone's Peter Travers gave the film three out of four stars, stating director Hancock and screenwriter Siegel did "strive hard—and mostly succeed—at keeping Hollywood sentiment out of the storytelling... Set more than a half-century ago, The Founder proves to be a movie for a divisive here and now. Step right up. You might just learn something." RogerEbert.com's Matt Zoller Seitz gave the film three out of four stars saying that despite the film over-relying on exposition and failing to skillfully incorporate Ray Kroc's personal life into the narrative, "I'd be lying if I said I hadn't thought about The Founder constantly since seeing it... It's an ad that becomes a warning before circling around and becoming another, darker kind of advertisement, and one of the most intriguing and surprising things about The Founder is that, in the end, it seems vaguely ashamed of itself for letting this happen".

=== Accolades ===
Year	Award	Category	Recipient(s)	Result	Ref.
2016	Capri Awards	Best Actor	Michael Keaton	Won	
2017	AARP Movies for Grownups Awards	Best Time Capsule	The Founder	Nominated	
2017	AARP Movies for Grownups Awards	Best Actor	Michael Keaton	Nominated	
2017	AARP Movies for Grownups Awards	Best Buddy Picture	John Carroll Lynch and Nick Offerman	Nominated	

== See also ==
- List of The Weinstein Company films
