= Tracey Ullman's State of the Union characters =

This is a complete list of original characters performed by Tracey Ullman in Tracey Ullman's State of the Union.

== A ==
=== Linda Alvarez ===
Appearances: Season 1, 2, and 3
Location: Buffalo, New York
Local news reporter. In Season two, she becomes the center of attention when she gets stung by a bee and the video ends up on YouTube.

=== Arnelle ===
Appearances: Season 2
Location: Las Vegas, Nevada
Cirque du Soleil performer.

== B ==
=== Doris Basham ===
Appearances: Season 1
Location: On the North Dakota/Canada Border
Elderly woman who gets busted for smuggling Canadian prescription drugs.

=== Muriel Bass ===
Appearances: Season 3
Location: Wichita, Kansas
Vocal coach.

=== Rosa Batista ===
Appearances: Season 1
Location: Stranded on the Katzman Memorial Bridge, Los Angeles, California
Housekeeper to Arianna Huffington.

=== Irma Billings ===
Appearances: Season 1
Location: Plainsville, Nebraska
Average citizen who converses with her neighbor, Betsy Jean.

== C ==
=== Tori Campbell ===
Appearances: Season 2
Location: New York, New York
Dog walker.

=== Beverly Carlyle ===
Appearances: Season 2
Piano bar performer.

=== Caroline ===
Appearances: Season 3
Location(s): San Francisco, California, Rapid City, North Dakota
Antiques Roadshow appraiser.

=== Robin Cavanaugh ===
Appearances: Season 2
Location: Chicago's Gold Coast
Wealthy wife who is forced to economize.

=== Marion Churchill ===
Appearances: Season 1
Location: New York, New York
Jamaican caregiver.

=== Leslie Katz-Coen ===
Appearances: Season 2
Location: Taos, New Mexico
Publicist to the Dalai Lama.

=== Simona Cowell ===
Appearances: Season 3
Location: Bel Air, California
Sister of Simon Cowell.

=== Grammy Cyrus ===
Appearances: Season 2
Location: Flatwoods, Kentucky
Grandmother to Miley Cyrus.

== D ==
=== Karen DaFoe ===
Appearances: Season 2
Location: Woodsville, Vermont
Mother of a pregnant teenager.

=== Zoey Daniels ===
Appearances: Season 3
Location: Coral Gables, Florida
Woman who, along with her husband, refuses to leave a rundown mansion.

== E ==
=== Vicky Emming ===
Appearances: Season 3
Location: Clovis, New Mexico
Woman addicted to the internet.

=== Esther ===
Appearances: Season 2
Location: Wild Spunk, Texas
FLDS woman.

=== Polly Everson ===
Appearances: Season 3
Location: Washington, DC
Woman who sets up for investigative hearings.

== F ==
=== Valerie Frumkiss ===
Appearances: Season 2
Location: Battlecreek, Michigan
Senior citizen and former performer.

== G ==
=== Lynne Garibaldi ===
Appearances: Season 2
Location: Albany, New York
Working class mother of a handicapped child who is obsessed with Harry Potter; she is also a historical reenactment actress.

=== Glamorous Hostess ===
Appearances: Season 2
Location: The Mayo Clinic, Minnesota
Host of So You Think You Can Die, a parody of So You Think You Can Dance.

=== Graceland Employee ===
Appearances: Season 3
Location: Memphis, Tennessee
Worker in souvenir shop.

== H ==
=== Abby Melina Harris ===
Appearances: Season 1
Location: Undisclosed location in Arizona
Owner of Dignity Village, a community for women 35 and over who wish "never to be seen in public again".

=== Lacy Harris ===
Appearances: Season 1
Location: Greenville, North Carolina
A farmer.

=== Dr. Kara Hemdale ===
Appearances: Season 3
Location: Bangor, Maine
Scientist who successfully clones Rupert Murdoch.

=== Rosarita Hernandez ===
Appearances: Season 2
Location: Texas/Mexico border
Illegal immigrant crossing the border.

== I ==
=== Import/Export Pier worker ===
Appearances: Season 1
Location: Long Beach, California
Export worker who worries about the state of American manufacturing.

== J ==
=== Juanita ===
Appearances: Season 2
Location: Los Angeles, California
Dancing with the Stars dancer.

=== JetBlue airline steward ===
Appearances: Season 1
Location: Grounded in, Chicago, Illinois
A flight attendant on a JetBlue flight.

== K ==
=== Sally Knox ===
Appearances: Season 1
Location: New York, New York
Investment banker having an ongoing affair with her boss, Chris Fullbright.

== L ==
=== Penny Landers ===
Appearances: Season 2
Location: Cascade Mountains, Central Oregon
Euthanasia provider.

=== Mary Ann LeFrak ===
Appearances: Season 1
Location: Columbus, Mississippi
An expectant mother in her seventies.

=== Jacqueline Lord ===
Appearances: Season 2 and 3
Location: Honolulu, Hawaii
Daughter of Jack Lord.

=== Rachel Ludlow ===
Appearances: Season 2
Location: Connecticut
Lesbian who is getting married.

=== Tina Luffler ===
Appearances: Season 3
Location: Plainsville, Missouri
Woman who went missing as a child in 1972 after being trapped in a basement by her father.

== M ==
=== Dr. Maguire ===
Appearances: Season 2
Overzealous doctor who over-prescribes medication.

=== Marta ===
Appearances: Season 2
Olympic trainer.

=== Sindra Mataal ===
Appearances: Season 1
Location: New York, New York
Undocumented Bangladeshi worker.

=== Brenda McKinney ===
Appearances: Season 3
Mother with an out-of-control pre-teen.

=== Dee McNally ===
Appearances: Season 2, and 3
Flight attendant.

=== Miriam Minger ===
Appearances: Season 2
Location: Casper, Wyoming
School teacher who seduces students.

=== Chanel Monticello ===
Appearances: Season 1, 2, and 3
Location: Chicago, Illinois, at O'Hare International
Airport security scanner.

=== Patty Sue Mulligan ===
Appearances: Season 3
Location: Waycross, Georgia
Teleservice center worker for India.

== N ==
=== Nancy ===
Appearances: Season 3
Location: Hudson River
Whale rescuer.

== O ==
=== Shrilynne O'Dale ===
Appearances: Season 1
Location: Colorado
Parishioner participating in a "Walk a Mile in Their Shoes" program.

== P ==
=== Mother Superior Rose Pannatella ===
Appearances: Season 1
Location: St. Mary's, Pennsylvania
A nun always in deep meditation.

=== Sgt. Lisa Penning ===
Appearances: Season 1 and 2
Location: Macon, Georgia
Soldier on leave from Iraq featured in a PBS special entitled Moms At War.

=== Padma Perkesh ===
Appearances: Season 1, 2 and 3
Location: Oak Ridge, Tennessee
An Indian American pharmacist who adds a Bollywood twist to medication side effects.

=== Chandra Perkett ===
Appearances: Season 1
Location: Coshocton, Ohio
Public access yoga instructor.

=== Ramona Petrie ===
Appearances: Season 2 and 3
Location: Summerston, West Virginia
Woman stuck in a small car.

=== Gretchen Pinkus ===
Appearances: Season 1, 2 and 3
Location: Huntsville, Texas
Widow of "The Wetwipe Killer" who later marries "The Tastee-Freez Rapist". Author of the memoir White Widow. She dies in a meth lab fire in Season 3.

=== Vanessa Pludd ===
Appearances: Season 2
Morbidly obese woman.

=== Carol Pholgren ===
Appearances: Season 3
Location: Akron, Ohio
Jeans entrepreneur.

== Q ==
=== Asmaa Qasim ===
Appearances: Season 1 and 2
Location: The Ozarks
The most famous star in Malawi, who comes to the U.S. to adopt an American child to save them from a life of obesity and stupidity.

== R ==
=== Emily Racine ===
Appearances: Season 3
Bookstore owner.

=== Marilyn Richter ===
Appearances: Season 3
Location: Guthrie, Oklahoma
CSI wannabe.

=== Ronnie Rooney ===
Appearances: Season 1
Location: Saint Paul, Minnesota
Older brother to Andy Rooney.

== S ==
=== Sacha Baron Cohen victim ===
Appearances: Season 3
Location: Osborne, Kansas
Woman suffering from PTSD due to the antics of comedian Sacha Baron Cohen.

=== Sally ===
Appearances: Season 3
Location: Flushing, Michigan
Green-collar worker.

=== Elena Sarkovsky ===
Appearances: Season 1
Location: New York, New York, at the United Nations
Russian UN interpreter.

=== September 11th Press Conference Organizer ===
Appearances: Season 3
Location: New York City
Presenter of proposed 9/11 monuments.

=== Shannon ===
Appearances: Season 2
Natural food store worker.

=== Janie Shaw ===
Appearances: Season 3
Location: Omaha
Woman harassed for smoking.

=== Shana Shonsteen ===
Appearances: Season 3
Location: Milwaukee, Wisconsin
Jewish female suitor.

=== Jillian Smart ===
Appearances: Season 2
Location: Central Arizona
Soccer mom.

=== Sandra Stevens ===
Appearances: Season 1
Location: Mustang, Oklahoma
WNBA coach.

== T ==
=== Tennis Instructor ===
Appearances: Season 3
Location: Jupiter, Florida
Female tennis instructor.

=== Anette Thomas ===
Appearances: Season 1
Location: Saint Paul, Minnesota
Regional theater actress returning to the stage after hip replacement surgery.

=== Ingrid Thorvall ===
Appearances: Season 2, and 3
Location: Oakridge, Tennessee
Woman with mitral valve prolapse forced to seek surgery abroad.

=== Wendy Trenton ===
Appearances: Season 2
Location: Illinois
Champion hog caller.

== U ==
=== Upper East side rich woman ===
Appearances: Season 3
Location: New York City
Woman who hides her extravagant purchases due to the recession.

== V ==
=== Carmen Valk ===
Appearances: Season 1
Location: East Coast
Homeless woman without health insurance.

== W ==
=== Edith Wertzel ===
Appearances: Season 3
Location: Spartanburg County, South Carolina
Obese woman who takes on laziness.

=== Emily Westin ===
Appearances: Season 3
Location: Flat River, Missouri
Woman desperate for employment.

=== Vera Wilson ===
Appearances: Season 3
Location: Laredo, Texas
Vendor at a gun show.
