= Harry J. Sonneborn =

American businessman and first president and CEO of McDonald's Corporation

- Born: Harold Morris Joseph; June 12, 1916; Evansville, Indiana, U.S.
- Died: September 21, 1992 (aged 76); Theodore, Alabama, U.S.
- Occupations: Business executive, President of Finances, Tastee-Freez, President McDonald's (1955–1967)
- Years active: 1939–1992
- Known for: First president of McDonald's
- Title: Father of Franchising
- Spouse(s): June Kepler (m. 1938-1964); Aloyis Lee (m. 1964)
- Children: 2

Harry J. Sonneborn (June 12, 1916 – September 21, 1992) was an American businessman, widely known as the first president and chief executive of McDonald's Corporation.

== Early life ==
Sonneborn was born Harold Morris Joseph on June 12, 1916 in Evansville, Indiana, the son of Minnie Greenbaum and Mark Harry Joseph. In 1921, when he was 5 years old, his mother and father died of tuberculosis. Harry was adopted by his paternal aunt, Jeanette (Joseph), and her husband, Louis Sonneborn, and raised in New York City. His family was orthodox Jewish.

== Career ==
=== Work with McDonald's ===
A former vice president of finances at Tastee-Freez, Sonneborn approached Ray Kroc with the concept of Kroc owning the land that McDonald outlets were to be built on and then leasing that land to the franchisee. This business model led to the explosive growth of McDonald's; the real estate deals were handled through a specially formed corporation named "McDonald's Franchise Realty Corp." The "Sonneborn model" persists to this day within the corporation, and might have been the most important financial decision in the company's history. By 2018 McDonald's real estate holdings represented $37.7 billion on its balance sheet, about 99% of the company's assets and about 35% of its global revenue.

Kroc appointed Sonneborn as McDonald's first president and chief executive officer in 1959. In 1967, he fell out with Kroc, who insisted on continuing expansion, while Sonneborn held the conservative view that the country was heading into a recession and they should stop building stores. Sonneborn resigned from McDonald's on June 8, 1967. Kroc took his title afterwards.

=== Other interests ===
After leaving McDonald's, Sonneborn continued to be involved in the business world through the stock market, capital investments, and banking. He and his wife Aloyis founded several philanthropic foundations.

Sonneborn was a noted collector of historical documents. His collection included an annotated copy of the US Constitution, copies of every US state's constitution, the document by Paul von Hindenburg declaring Adolf Hitler as dictator of Germany and a letter written by Vladimir Lenin denouncing anti-semitism in Russia.

== Personal life ==
Sonneborn married June Kepler on December 13, 1938. They raised two children together, a son and a daughter. A divorce was granted in 1964 in which June received a property settlement of $785,000 that included their home in Winnetka, Illinois, alimony, insurance, child support and $200,000 in payment for her half of their McDonald's stock. Sonneborn married Aloyis Lee in 1964.

In 1969, June sued Sonneborn for more than $21 million. She claimed he had told her the stock was only worth $5 per share and bought her out before the divorce, then sold her shares six months afterwards for $22.50 per share. A federal jury exonerated Harry Sonneborn and found against his ex-wife in 1971.

Following his retirement in 1967, Sonneborn and his wife Aloyis moved to Mobile, Alabama. They built an estate on the Fowl River that included a 14,500 square-foot house, a small golf course, a dock and a 630-acre wildlife preserve.

Sonneborn died at his home in Theodore, Alabama, on September 21, 1992.

== In popular culture ==
In the 2016 film The Founder, Sonneborn was portrayed by actor B. J. Novak, who spoke the famous line "You're not in the burger business; you're in the real estate business."
