= The Incentive =

- The Office episode
- Episode no.: Season 8 Episode 2
- Directed by: Charles McDougall
- Written by: Paul Lieberstein
- Cinematography by: Matt Sohn
- Editing by: Claire Scanlon
- Production code: 801
- Original air date: September 29, 2011
- Running time: 22 minutes

Guest appearance
- Erica Vittina Phillips as Justine

Episode chronology
| ← Previous "The List" | Next → "Lotto" |
- The Office (American season 8)

"The Incentive" is the second episode of the eighth season of the American comedy television series The Office, and the show's 154th episode overall. It was written by showrunner Paul Lieberstein and directed by Charles McDougall. The episode originally aired on NBC in the United States on September 29, 2011.

The series—presented as if it were a real documentary—depicts the everyday lives of office employees in the Scranton, Pennsylvania, branch of the fictional Dunder Mifflin Paper Company. In the episode, after Robert California (James Spader) challenges the Dunder Mifflin staffers to double their sales, Andy Bernard (Ed Helms), taking matters into his own hands, creates an incentive program. Eventually, he promises to tattoo himself if the staff earn a certain number of points. Meanwhile, Pam Halpert (Jenna Fischer) strikes up an unlikely friendship with Angela Lipton (Angela Kinsey), both of whom are pregnant.

The episode introduces Sabre's Pyramid tablet, a device that serves as a parody of several tablet computers, specifically the Apple iPad. The device would be explored later on in the season. "The Incentive" received mixed reviews from critics with many mainly criticizing the episode for recycling stories. According to Nielsen Media Research, the episode was viewed by 6.7 million viewers and received a 3.5 rating/9 percent share among adult between the ages of 18 and 49, marking a drop in the ratings from the season premiere, "The List".

== Synopsis ==
Robert California challenges office manager Andy Bernard to double sales after a rousing motivational speech. After Andy tries unsuccessfully to mine ideas from the office employees, he consults a book on management techniques and decides to try an incentives program. He presents a number of items catered to individual employees, which they can purchase with "points" earned by exceptional workplace performance. This idea garners mixed reactions from the employees, but when Jim Halpert jokingly asks Andy what prizes he will offer for inordinately large numbers of points, he offers to tattoo whatever his co-workers would like on his butt in exchange for 5,000 points, anticipating that nobody will be able to even come close to this number.

The entire staff agrees to pool their points towards Andy's butt tattoo, and the office suddenly becomes a hubbub of activity, with Stanley Hudson even giving up his nap-time to make sales calls for Sabre's new Pyramid tablet. Andy calls the management book's author for advice to "demotivate" his employees but is hung up on. To Andy's great dismay, they earn 5,000 points by the end of the day. When Andy and the crew go to the tattoo parlor, Andy backs down and admits to Jim that he is not sure why Robert made him manager. Jim reassures Andy that he managed to pick up sales, and that no one in the office expects him to go through with the tattoo idea. Pepped up by Jim's talk, Andy enthusiastically agrees to getting the tattoo, which Pam Halpert changes, without telling Andy, to an image of a dog that has "Nard" written on it, a reference to Andy's nickname "Nard Dog." Upon seeing his completed tattoo in a mirror, Andy is pleased with the result. Robert then reveals to the cameras that he picked Andy because he is an uncomplicated choice which causes people to rally behind him, because "there's something about an underdog that really inspires the unexceptional."

Pam and Angela Lipton become walking buddies for their pregnancies at Angela's request, but after Angela says she's reported Pam to Social Services for drinking herbal tea out of coffee mugs while pregnant, a bothered Pam tells Angela they should stick to their pregnancies on their own from now on.

== Production ==
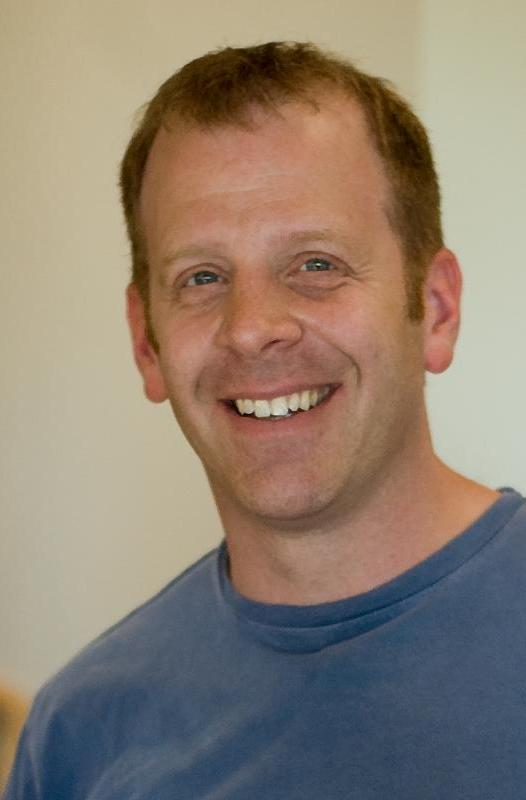
"The Incentive" was written by Paul Lieberstein.

The episode was written by executive producer and showrunner Paul Lieberstein, who also portrays Toby Flenderson on the series, his 15th writing credit for the series. It was directed by Charles McDougall, the sixth episode he has directed for the series. The episode also featured guest star James Spader as CEO Robert California, his third appearance in the series. He appeared in 15 episodes of the season, before leaving the show. The subplot wherein California listens to Kevin's ideas was crafted to make the character "connect with his employees".

The Season Eight DVD contains a number of deleted scenes from this episode. Notable cut scenes include Erin trying to comfort Andy by giving him a gift, Andy describing his low key management style, and Andy seeking more advice on which tie combination to wear.

== Cultural references ==
The episode marks the first appearance of Sabre's Pyramid tablet. The device serves as a parody of several tablet computers, specifically the Apple iPad. B. J. Novak described the device as "really the worst piece of technology that you've ever seen." The device was created by Paul Lieberstein, who originally envisioned that the device only had the rights to the 1993 film Coneheads.

== Reception ==
=== Ratings ===
Upon its original American broadcast, "The Incentive" was viewed by an estimated 6.70 million viewers and received a 3.5 rating/9 percent share among adults between the ages of 18 and 49. This means that it was seen by 3.9 percent of all 18- to 49-year-olds, and 9 percent of all 18- to 49-year-olds watching television at the time of the broadcast. This marked a 13-percent drop in the ratings from the previous episode, "The List". Despite this, it ranked as the highest-rated NBC show on Thursday. The episode ranked third in its timeslot beating Person of Interest which received a 2.7 rating/7 percent share in the 18–49 demographic and The Secret Circle which received a 1.0 rating/2 percent share, but was defeated by Grey's Anatomy which received a 3.6 rating/9 percent share and The X Factor which received a 3.9 rating/11 percent share.

=== Reviews ===
"The Incentive" received average reviews from critics with multiple critics criticizing the episode for recycling storylines. The A.V. Club reviewer Myles McNutt noted that the episode "wasn't a trainwreck by any means", but he was disappointed by the fact that the episode recycled storylines from the early seasons of The Office. He also criticized the series for low stakes writing that "While Andy's character might be reflecting on his management skills, and Pam and Angela might be pregnant, nothing about the eighth season" of the series suggested that the show would try anything other than what it had already established as the status quo. He ultimately gave the episode a "C".

M. Giant from Television Without Pity awarded the episode a "B−". Cindy White from IGN gave the episode a mixed review, writing that it took a "step back" from the promise of the season premiere and resorted to "recycl[ing] familiar plot elements" for the sake of the plot. She did, however, compliment the fact that Andy went through on his promise in the end. Dan Forcella of TV Fanatic awarded the episode three stars out of five and concluded that "allowing [Andy] to be the lead character of The Office is not off to a strong start." Jonathan Teigland of Starpulse called the episode's dynamic "interesting" and stated that "The Incentive" ended on "a sweet note".

The episode's cold opening received negative reviews from critics. White called it "dumb", and noted that the joke "became grating very quickly". Teigland called the subplot "stale" and argued that it "[fell] a little flat". McNutt was hoping that the cold opening would have attempted to explain Kevin's lower intelligence, instead of just using it as a crutch for a joke.
