= Jesse Novak =

American composer

- Occupation: Composer
- Years active: 2012–present
- Notable work: BoJack Horseman (music from the Netflix original series)
- Father: William Novak
- Relatives: B. J. Novak (brother)

Jesse Novak is an American composer, best known for his work scoring television shows, including The Mindy Project, BoJack Horseman, Tuca & Bertie, The Baby-Sitters Club, and Superstore. He is the brother of actor and producer B. J. Novak, and the son of author William Novak.

== Personal life ==
Novak comes from a Jewish family in Massachusetts. His parents are Linda (née Manaly) and author William Novak. His father co-edited The Big Book of Jewish Humor, and has ghostwritten memoirs for Nancy Reagan, Lee Iacocca, Magic Johnson, and others. Novak has two brothers: Lev Novak and B. J. Novak.
