= Hamburger Stand =

American fast food chain

- Type: Subsidiary
- Industry: Restaurants
- Genre: Fast food
- Founded: 1982; 44 years ago Garden Gove, California, U.S.
- Headquarters: Irvine, California, United States
- Number of locations: 13 (2021)
- Area served: Arizona, California, Colorado, Wyoming
- Products: Hamburgers; Sandwiches; Hot dogs; french fries; soft drinks; soft serves; milkshakes; breakfast
- Parent: The Galardi Group
- Website: hamburgerstand.com

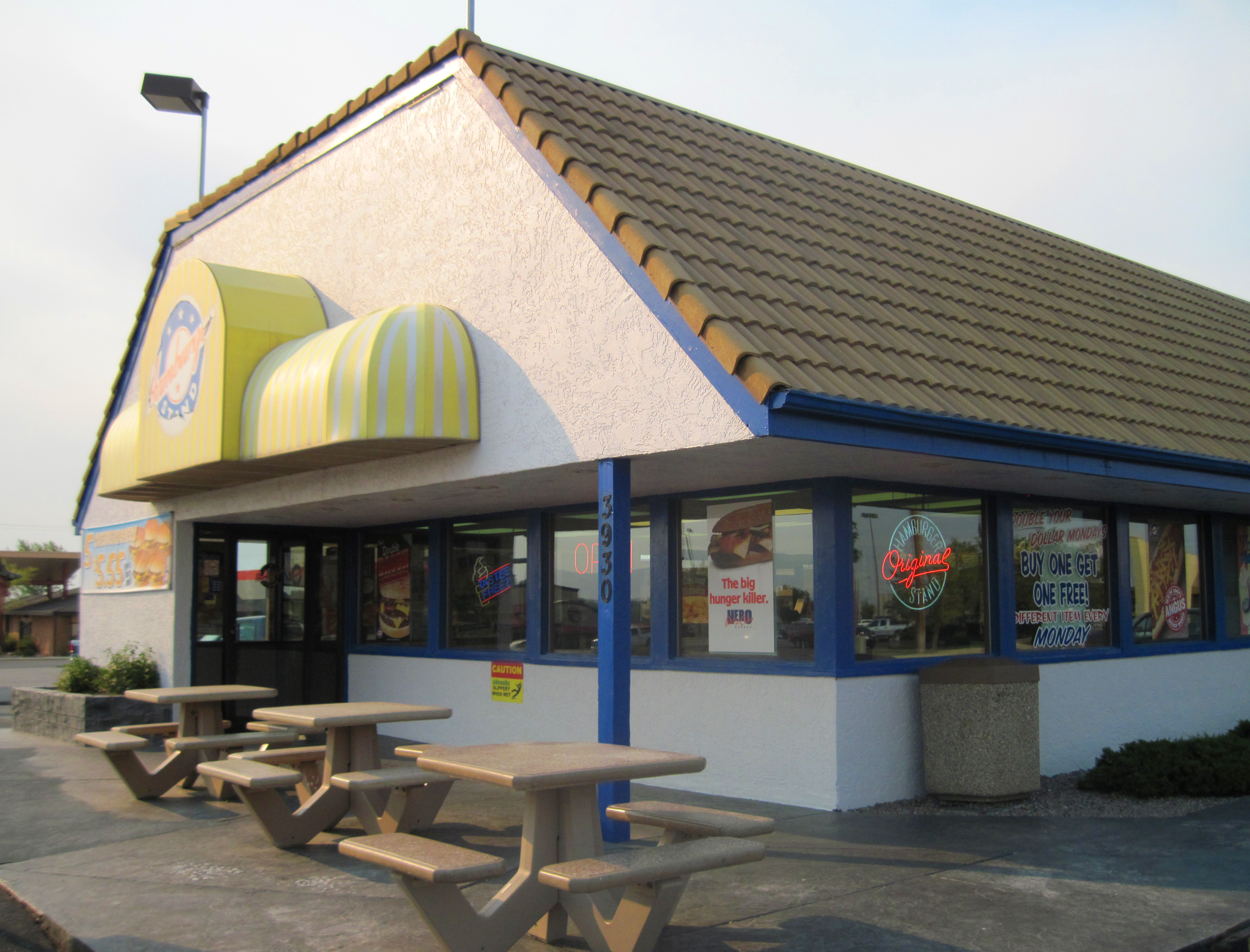
Hamburger Stand restaurant in Casper, Wyoming

Hamburger Stand is a regional fast food chain in the western United States. Besides its low-cost burgers, the restaurant's menu features items from its sister companies Wienerschnitzel and Tastee-Freez at some of its locations. It has locations in Arizona, California, Colorado, and Wyoming.

== History ==
In 1979, Wienerschnitzel attempted to broaden its offerings and added hamburgers to its menus. However, with little success into the 1980s, the company (which was eventually renamed to the Galardi Group) started two new chains in 1983, The Original Hamburger Stand and Weldon's gourmet hamburgers (which was cast off in the 1990s). Poorly performing Wienerschnitzel locations were replaced with The Original Hamburger Stands in locations such as the Denver area. The original cost of the hamburgers, french fries, and drinks were all 39 cents each.

== See also ==
- List of hamburger restaurants
