= Lotto (The Office) =

- The Office episode
- Episode no.: Season 8 Episode 3
- Directed by: John Krasinski
- Written by: Charlie Grandy
- Cinematography by: Matt Sohn
- Editing by: Claire Scanlon
- Production code: 805
- Original air date: October 6, 2011
- Running time: 22 minutes

Guest appearances
- Hugh Dane as Hank Tate; Mark Proksch as Nate Nickerson

Episode chronology
← Previous "The Incentive"	Next → "Garden Party"
- The Office (American season 8)

"Lotto" is the third episode of the eighth season of the American comedy television series The Office, and the show's 155th episode overall. It was written by Charlie Grandy and directed by cast member John Krasinski. The episode originally aired on NBC in the United States on October 6, 2011. The episode guest stars Mark Proksch as Nate and Hugh Dane as Hank the security guard.

The series—presented as if it were a real documentary—depicts the everyday lives of office employees in the Scranton, Pennsylvania, branch of the fictional Dunder Mifflin Paper Company. In the episode, the entire warehouse staff quits after winning the lottery, leaving Andy Bernard (Ed Helms) and Darryl Philbin (Craig Robinson) to scramble for replacements while Jim Halpert (John Krasinski), Erin Hannon (Ellie Kemper), Dwight Schrute (Rainn Wilson), and Kevin Malone (Brian Baumgartner) temporarily get a taste of the warehouse life.

"Lotto" received mixed reviews from television critics, with many enjoying Andy and Darryl's interaction. According to Nielsen Media Research, the episode was viewed by 5.82 million viewers and received a 3.2 rating/8 percent share among adults between the ages of 18 and 49, marking a slight drop in the ratings from the previous episode, "The Incentive".

== Synopsis ==
The six warehouse workers win $950,000 in a lottery pool, and quit in a celebratory fashion of running through the office, making a mess and mooning the staff. Darryl Philbin, who was originally part of the pool but stopped when he was promoted, falls into a depression, unable to find any motivation to work and is further dismayed when his ex-wife's response to him not winning is to ask for the phone number of his pool-winner friend Glenn. Everyone else speculates how they would spend a hypothetical lottery score, with Jim Halpert and Pam Halpert ultimately deciding to fuse their two main ideas into one for a lovely brownstone located in the great outdoors.

Andy Bernard orders Darryl to hire replacements for the warehouse staff, but Darryl is wallowing in his depression and neglects to even look at the applications. With an order due out for one of Phyllis Vance's most important clients, Andy asks for volunteers to step in for the day and make sure that the order is shipped out. Jim, Erin Hannon, Dwight Schrute, and Kevin Malone take over the process, (however, in a talking-head interview, Kevin states that he will deliberately do a poor job because he did not volunteer and was merely suggested for the job because of his large size), but do not know how to use the heavy-lifting equipment and balk at the notion of carrying all the heavy boxes by hand. Upon Kevin's suggestion, they create an oil luge to slide the boxes across the floor, resulting in a lot of damaged inventory. They retool Kevin's idea throughout the day, resulting in still more damaged inventory, and Phyllis ultimately loses the client.

A melancholic Darryl finally assembles a conference room meeting with several potential new hires, but utters several discouraging remarks about the job and exits, leaving Andy alone to take charge of the process. Andy does not know what he is doing and all of the applicants walk out. Darryl blames himself for the failure and demands that Andy fire him, leaving Andy baffled and with no choice but to handle the hiring of new warehouse staff himself.

Andy assembles three applicants: a bodybuilder from Oscar Martinez's gym, Dwight's building handyman Nate, and a PhD candidate who can only work two days a week. Darryl demands anew to be fired, then switches gears: he tells Andy to give him the manager job, saying he deserves it and wants that or a pink slip. Andy then steps up and bluntly tells Darryl he not only is not going to do that, but Darryl was not even the runner-up to Andy in the selection process. As he brings up Darryl's short temper, his hiring of the unqualified Glenn as the warehouse foreman, and his loss of interest in taking business education courses, Darryl finally snaps out of his funk and listens to him. Andy tells Darryl that Jo Bennett loved him and saw something in him, and he simply stopped striving after that. He convinces Darryl to stay on board, and Darryl says he will assemble a new warehouse staff using a combination of his picks and one or two of Andy's applicants.

== Production ==
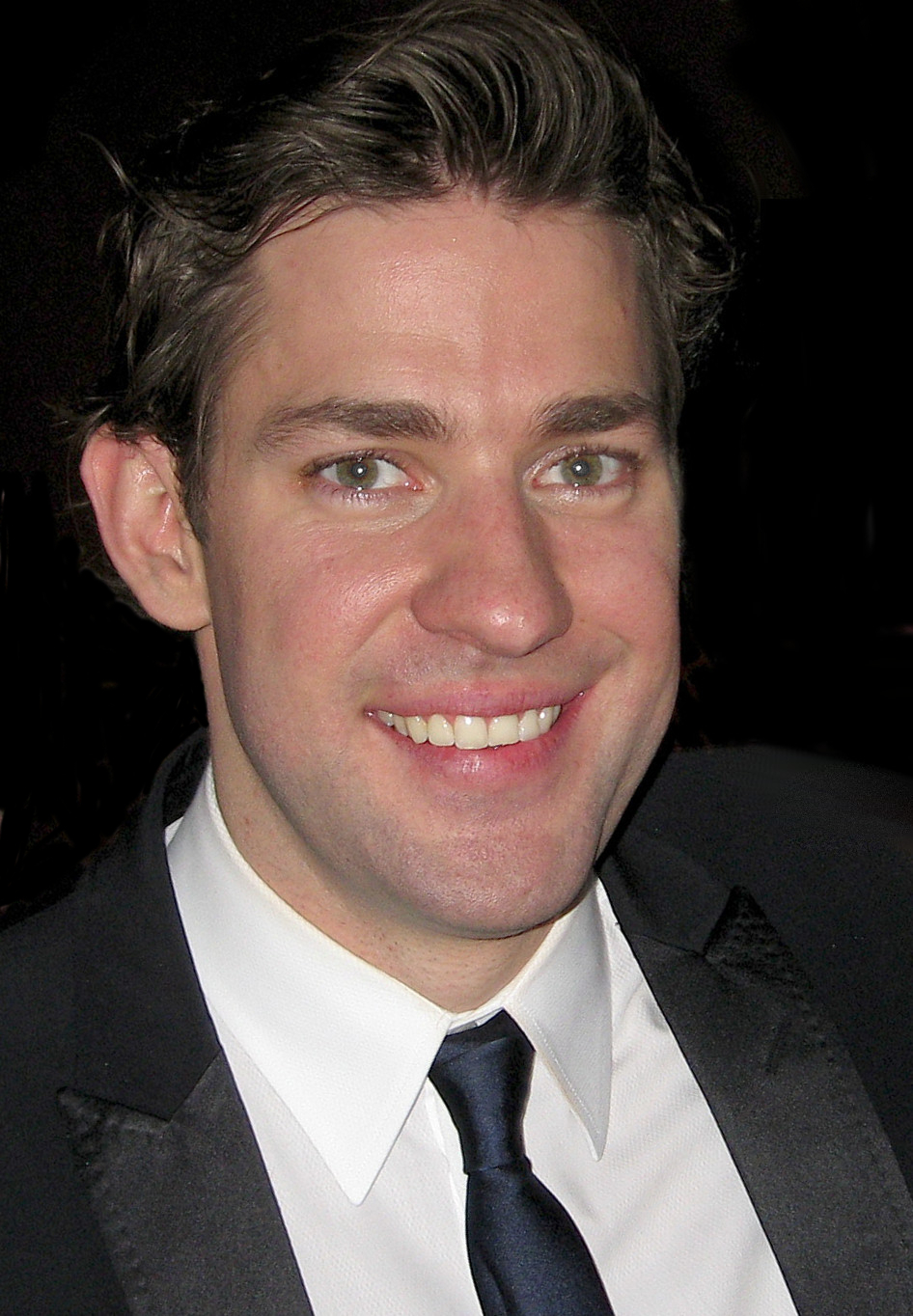
"Lotto" was directed by John Krasinski.

"Lotto" was written by co-executive producer and series writer Charlie Grandy. The episode was directed by cast member John Krasinski, who portrays Jim Halpert. This was the second episode directed by Krasinski for the series, after sixth season episode "Sabre". The episode guest stars Mark Proksch as Nate. Proksch initially appeared in "Sex Ed", and was hired by Dwight to be a handyman around the office.

The Season Eight DVD contains a number of deleted scenes from this episode. Notable cut scenes include Jim and the others trying to get the truck into the warehouse door but getting the truck stuck instead, Dwight trying to use Kevin as a bumper on the oil track, and Phyllis, Toby, and Ryan revealing what they would do if they won the lottery.

== Cultural references ==
Pam tells Jim that in his lottery fantasy "we're Stephen King characters", due to his desire to live in Maine. During one sequence, the scene begins in medias res when Jim and Dwight are having a conversation about the films Message in a Bottle and The Postman, both of which involve Kevin Costner. Toby Flenderson (Paul Lieberstein) mentions that, if he won the lottery, he would spend most of his money on launching his true crime podcast, called The Flenderson Files. During one part, Andy is sad when no one in the office appears to be a fan of Newhart.

== Reception ==
=== Ratings ===
In its original American broadcast on NBC, "Lotto" was viewed by 5.82 million viewers and received a 3.2 rating/8 percent share among adults between the ages of 18 and 49. This means that it was seen by 3.2 percent all 18- to 49-year-olds, and 8 percent of all 18- to 49-year-olds watching television at the time of the broadcast. This marked an 11 percent drop from the previous episode, "The Incentive" which made it one of the lowest-rated episodes of the series, slightly higher than the first-season episode, "Health Care". (Note: Television Without Pity claims that the episode was the "lowest-rated episode [of the series] since April 26, 2005", which would have been "Hot Girl", which was viewed by 4.8 million. However, "Health Care" was viewed by 5 million.)

=== Reviews ===
"Lotto" received mixed reviews from television critics. HitFix reviewer Alan Sepinwall wrote highly of the serious dialogue in the episode, noting that "if there's been a consistent element to Paul Lieberstein's work on this show ... it's that he understands what makes the main characters tick, and is able to use that for real emotional resonance ... When the show wants to give Jim, or Pam, or Dwight, or now Andy a quiet, emotional moment, it's usually still able to do so very well, and that includes most of Andy and Darryl's interaction here in 'Lotto'". He was, however, more critical of the episode's humor, noting that many of the gags had been done before. The A.V. Club reviewer Myles McNutt called the episode superior to the previous episode commenting that "While perhaps not monumentally better than last week's outing and damaged by a weak B-story, 'Lotto' had a greater sense of purpose that holds greater value to the season as it moves forward". He also complimented the writers for not focusing too much on Andy. He ultimately gave the episode a "B".

Cindy White of IGN awarded the episode a seven out of ten, denoting a "good" episode. She wrote that the entry "felt like a mid-season episode, passably amusing, but nothing all that special or memorable". White did, however, call Pam and Jim's discussion about their lottery fantasy "the weakest part of the episode". Dan Forcella of TV Fanatic awarded the episode three out of five stars. He called the premise "an interesting buddy story" with "a tremendously inspiring speech from Andy to Darryl". Despite the lackluster rating, Forcella wrote that the episode had its fair share "of hilarious moments". Screencrave reviewer Jeffrey Hyatt awarded the episode a six out of ten and wrote that the episode was not an "A-plus episode [but] the show still delivered some kick-ass dialogue that had me laughing out loud."

Critical reception to Jim, Dwight, Kevin, and Erin in the warehouse was more mixed. Sepinwall criticized the warehouse subplot for "selling them [the characters] out for the sake of a joke". Forcella, who gave the majority of the episode a positive review, was more critical of the installments subplot. Andrew Daglas of ChicagoNow, on the other hand, was more positive towards the subplot, calling it "generally amusing". He called "Ellie Kemper with a smudge of dirt" on her face "totes adorbs."
