= The Premise =

American drama anthology television series

- Promotional poster
- Genre: Anthology series
- Created by: B. J. Novak
- Country of origin: United States
- Original language: English
- No. of seasons: 1
- No. of episodes: 5

Production
- Executive producers: B. J. Novak; John Lesher
- Running time: 29–32 minutes
- Production companies: Novak; Le Grisbi Productions; FXP

Original release
- Network: FX on Hulu
- Release: September 16 – October 7, 2021

The Premise is an American anthology television series created by B. J. Novak. It premiered on FX on Hulu on September 16, 2021. In February 2023, the series was cancelled after one season. The series was removed from Hulu on May 26, 2023.

== Synopsis ==
Each episode tells a single character driven story about a current world situated issue.

== Episodes ==
No.	Title	Directed by	Written by	Original release date	Prod. code
1	"Social Justice Sex Tape"	Kitao Sakurai	B. J. Novak and Josie Duffy Rice	September 16, 2021	XPMV1003
A self-declared "woke" white nerd finds out that the evidence that can prove police committed an act of brutality is on a hugely embarrassing sex tape featuring himself. Cast : Ben Platt, Ayo Edebiri, Tracee Ellis Ross, Jermaine Fowler
2	"Moment of Silence"	B. J. Novak	B. J. Novak	September 16, 2021	XPMV1002
One year after his daughter was murdered in a mass shooting, her father takes on a high-level job at a gun rights' organization. His co-workers become concerned about his motives and mental state. Cast : Jon Bernthal, Boyd Holbrook, Beau Bridges, Amy Landecker
3	"The Ballad of Jesse Wheeler"	B. J. Novak	B. J. Novak	September 23, 2021	XPMV1001
A former student turned rock star arrives at his high school with an intriguing offer: the person who earns that year's Valedictorian honor will also get to spend a night with him. Cast : Lucas Hedges, Kaitlyn Dever, O'Shea Jackson Jr., George Wallace, Ed Asner, Brendan Scannell, Grace Song
4	"The Commenter"	Darya Zhuk	Jia Tolentino and B. J. Novak	September 30, 2021	XPMV1004
A successful influencer has a perfect life with one exception that ends up upending it entirely: an online troll who hates everything she does and everything about her. Cast : Lola Kirke, Soko, Sylvia Grace Crim, Benjamin Clement
5	"Butt Plug"	Jake Schreier	B. J. Novak	October 7, 2021	XPMV1005
A downtrodden guy whose childhood target of bullying is now one of the world's most successful businessmen makes him an offer of 1 hour to pitch a very unusual and specific product to him. Cast : Daniel Dae Kim, Eric Lange, Bryan Batt

== Production ==
In July 2019, FX ordered a two-episode pilot order for an anthology created by B. J. Novak and produced by FXP. In May 2020, FX picked up the series. Lucas Hedges, Kaitlyn Dever, Jon Bernthal, and Boyd Holbrook were cast for pilot episodes in 2019 while Ben Platt, Tracee Ellis Ross, and Daniel Dae Kim, among others, were announced to be starring in the series in August 2021. During the summer TCA press tour, Novak shed light on his efforts to cast Jack Nicholson in the series and explained that they had scrapped the episode after they couldn't cast him. Music is by Emily Bear and Brooke Blair. On February 15, 2023, FX on Hulu cancelled the series after one season.

== Release ==
The series premiered on September 16, 2021, on FX on Hulu in the United States. Internationally, the series is available through Disney+ under the dedicated streaming hub Star in select markets whereas Disney+ Hotstar premiered the series in India on September 17, 2021.

== Reception ==
The review aggregator website Rotten Tomatoes reports a 41% approval rating with an average rating of 5.6/10, based on 17 critic reviews. The website's critics consensus reads, "A mixed bag of good intentions that ultimately falls flat, The Premise's attempts to grapple with complex social issues aren't funny enough to work as satire, but lack the dramatic heft necessary to be satisfying melodrama." Metacritic gave the series a weighted average score of 53 out of 100 based on 14 critic reviews, indicating "mixed or average reviews".
