= Wienerschnitzel =

American fast-food restaurant chain

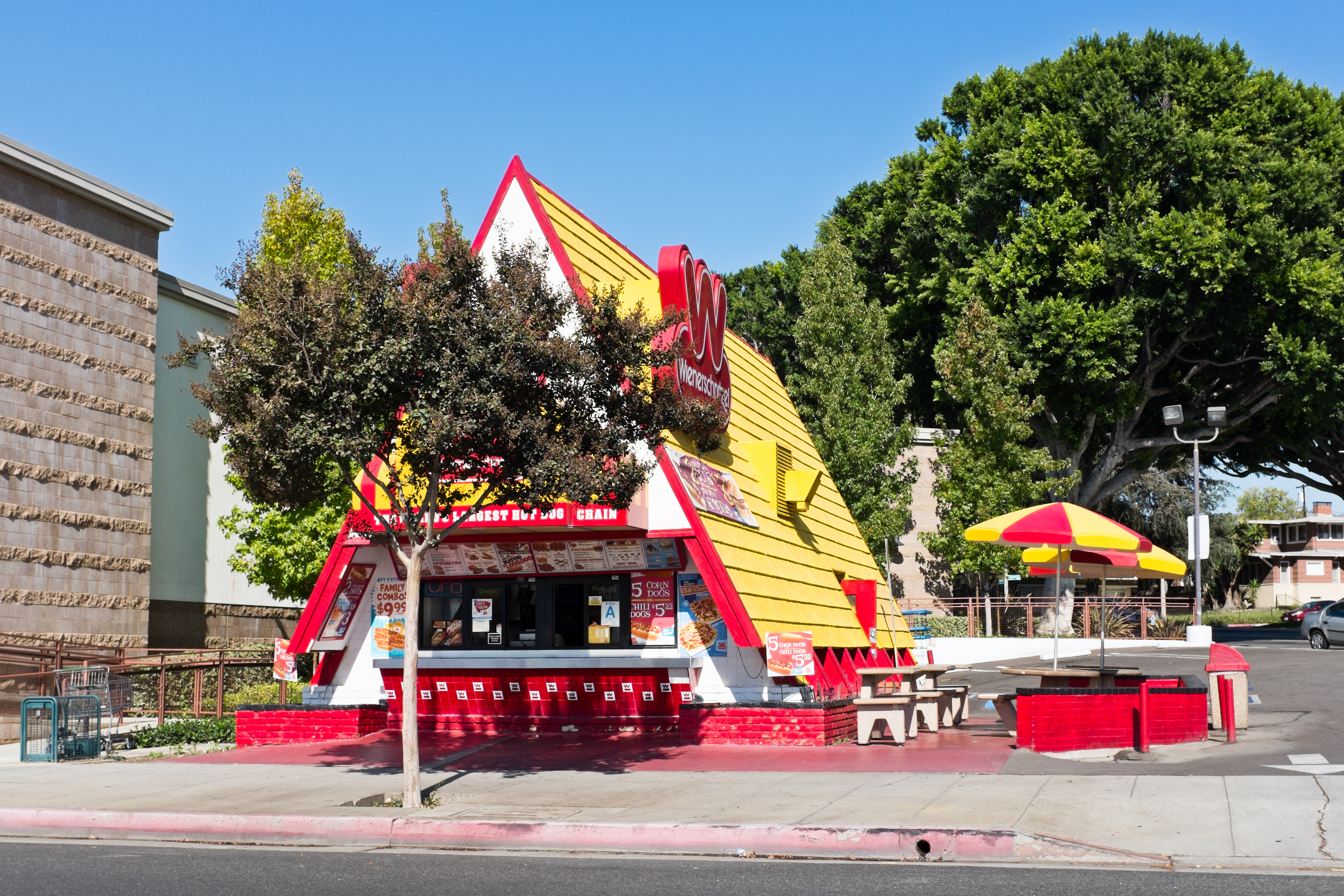
- An older A-frame roof Wienerschnitzel restaurant in Whittier, California
- Type: Subsidiary of The Galardi Group
- Industry: Restaurants
- Genre: Fast food
- Founded: Los Angeles, California, U.S. (1961; 65 years ago)
- Founder: John Galardi
- Headquarters: Tustin, California, U.S.
- Number of locations: 322 (2026)
- Area served: United States
- Key people: Cindy Culpepper (CEO, The Galardi Group)
- Products: Hot dogs; Hamburgers; Sandwiches; french fries; soft drinks; soft serves; milkshakes; breakfast
- Revenue: ▲US$341 million (2019)
- Number of employees: 5,000 (2019)
- Parent: The Galardi Group
- Website: wienerschnitzel.com

Wienerschnitzel is an American fast food chain that specializes in hot dogs and other food products. The chain, known as Der Wienerschnitzel until 1979, was founded by entrepreneur John Galardi in 1961. Despite the name, the company does not ordinarily sell Wiener schnitzel, doing so once as a promotion. Wienerschnitzel locations are found predominantly in California and Texas; others are found in Arizona, Arkansas, Colorado, Idaho, Illinois, Louisiana, New Mexico, Nevada, Utah, Nebraska and Washington, as well as the U.S. territory of Guam. Outside the United States, there are stores located in Ecuador.

The chain is most notable for the A-frame roofs of its older restaurants, similar to the original structures used by IHOP, Tastee-Freez, Nickerson Farms, and Whataburger. The chain's advertising mascot is an anthropomorphized hot dog known as the Delicious One. The character was originally conceptualized in 1997 by creative directors Courtney Betley and Julia Cadar as "The World's Most Wanted Wiener." TDO debuted as a claymation character who was voiced and animated by Luke Thomas, with visual development handled by the London-based production company Loose Moose. The character's primary comedic premise involves running away from hungry humans attempting to eat him. Thomas regularly voiced and worked on the character's campaigns until the mascot went on a television hiatus after 2008. Wienerschnitzel later revived the character in January 2014 using a 2D-animated style voiced by Justin Roiland.

Wienerschnitzel sponsors the Wiener Nationals, the de facto national dachshund racing championship series in the United States.

== Etymology ==
The word das Wienerschnitzel is German and, like Jägerschnitzel and Zigeunerschnitzel, was spelled as one word before the spelling reform of 1996. The restaurant's name is a compound of Wiener and Schnitzel, meaning "Viennese" and "cutlet" respectively.

In American English, wiener is a colloquial name for a hot dog, which is sometimes called Wiener Würstchen ("little Viennese sausage") in German. The specific phrase Wiener Schnitzel denotes a "Viennese breaded veal cutlet", something the restaurant chain has served briefly as a limited menu item in 2017.

== History ==
Der Wienerschnitzel was the brainchild of John N. Galardi, whose first job upon arriving in California at age 19 was from Glen Bell (later the founder of Taco Bell). Bell initially hired him on a part-time basis for 50 cents an hour at a taco store called Taco-Tia. Eventually, Galardi entered into a partnership agreement to run the store. Bell offered to sell the store to Galardi for $12,000, who later amassed enough money to make the purchase.

A couple of years later, a man wanted to recruit Galardi to start his own restaurant at a location on Pacific Coast Highway in Wilmington, next to one of Bell's taco stores. Bell encouraged him to take the offer, but wanted to have Galaradi sell another kind of food; Galardi decided to sell hot dogs. According to Galardi, his wife came up with the name when looking through a cookbook. He was initially skeptical of the name, saying, "I told my wife going home nobody in their right mind would call a company Wienerschnitzel. Three days later, I said, 'Hell, it's better than John's Hot Dogs.'" The first location was opened in June 1961 as a hot-dog stand at 1362 Gulf Avenue in the Los Angeles community of Wilmington. The article "der" was removed from the chain's name, and a new logo, designed by Bass/Yager & Associates, debuted at the beginning of 1979. The iteration currently in use is a slight redesign from 2007.

In the late 1980s, Galardi converted several stores in Denver, Colorado, and other Western cities into Hamburger Stand restaurants. Wienerschnitzels now sell Tastee-Freez ice cream, another brand owned by Galardi.

Galardi died of pancreatic cancer on April 13, 2013. His ex-wife, Cynthia Galardi-Culpepper, who previously was a silent partner, assumed the role as CEO and chairwoman after his death. She was the corporation's first and only woman in a managerial position, later appearing in reality television series Undercover Boss in 2016.

In 2015, the company signed a franchise agreement with International Food Concepts Inc. to plan and open Wienerschnitzel locations in Panama.

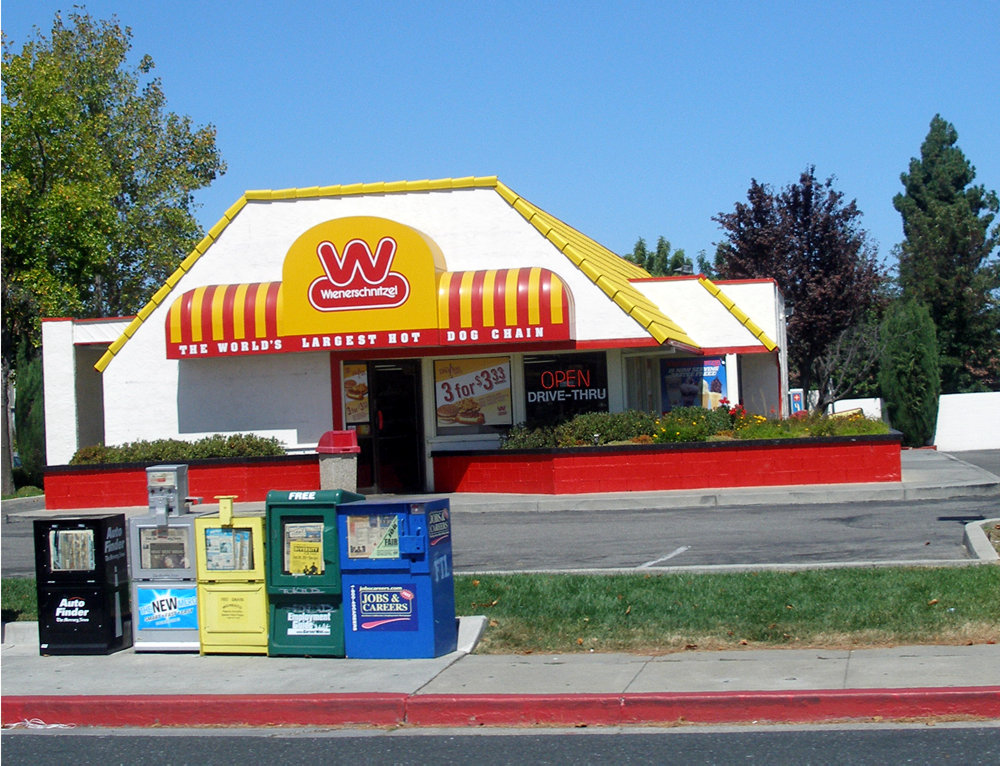
Wienerschnitzel located in Sunnyvale, California, closed in July 2008

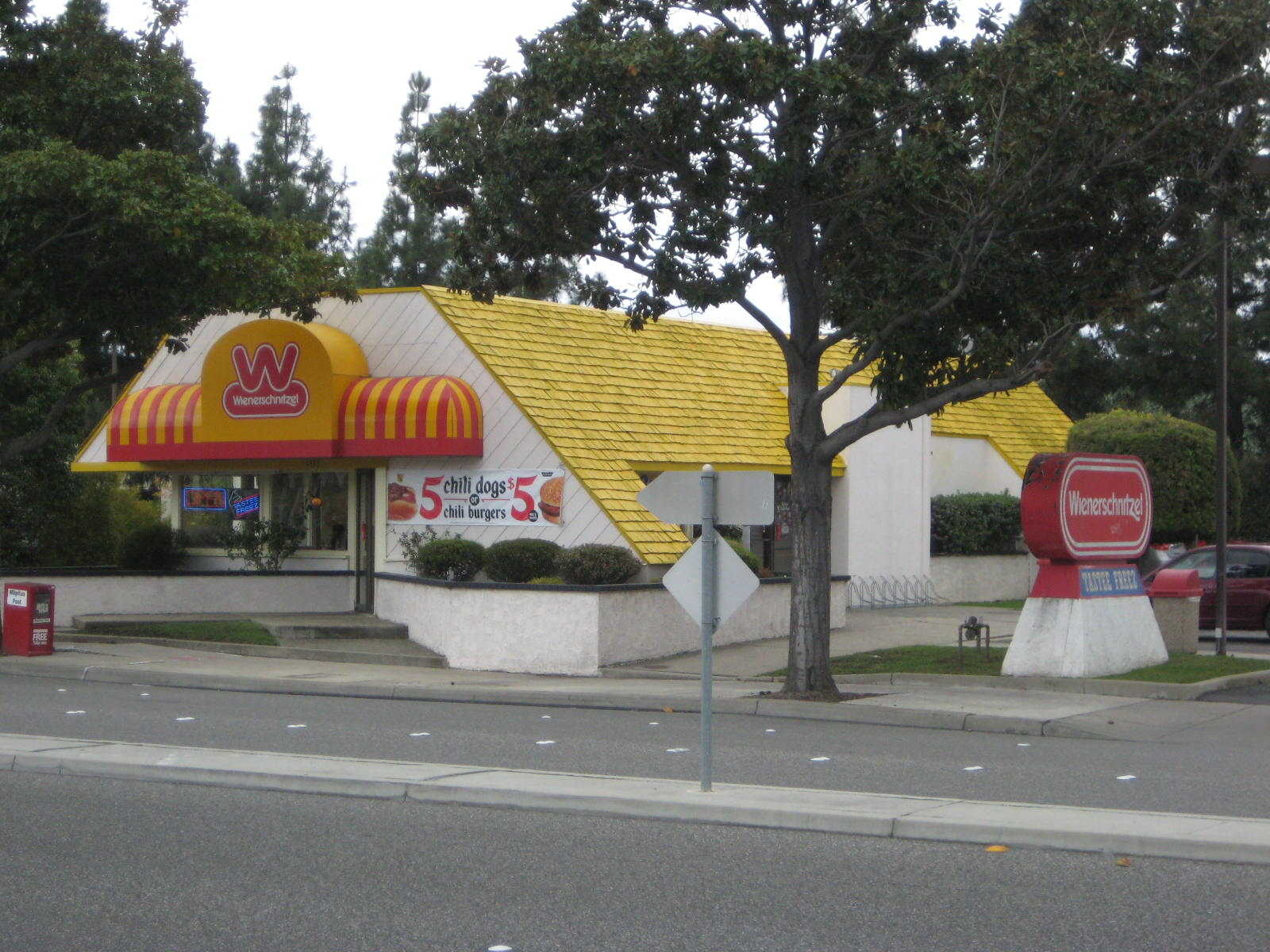
Wienerschnitzel located in Milpitas, California, closed in July 2014

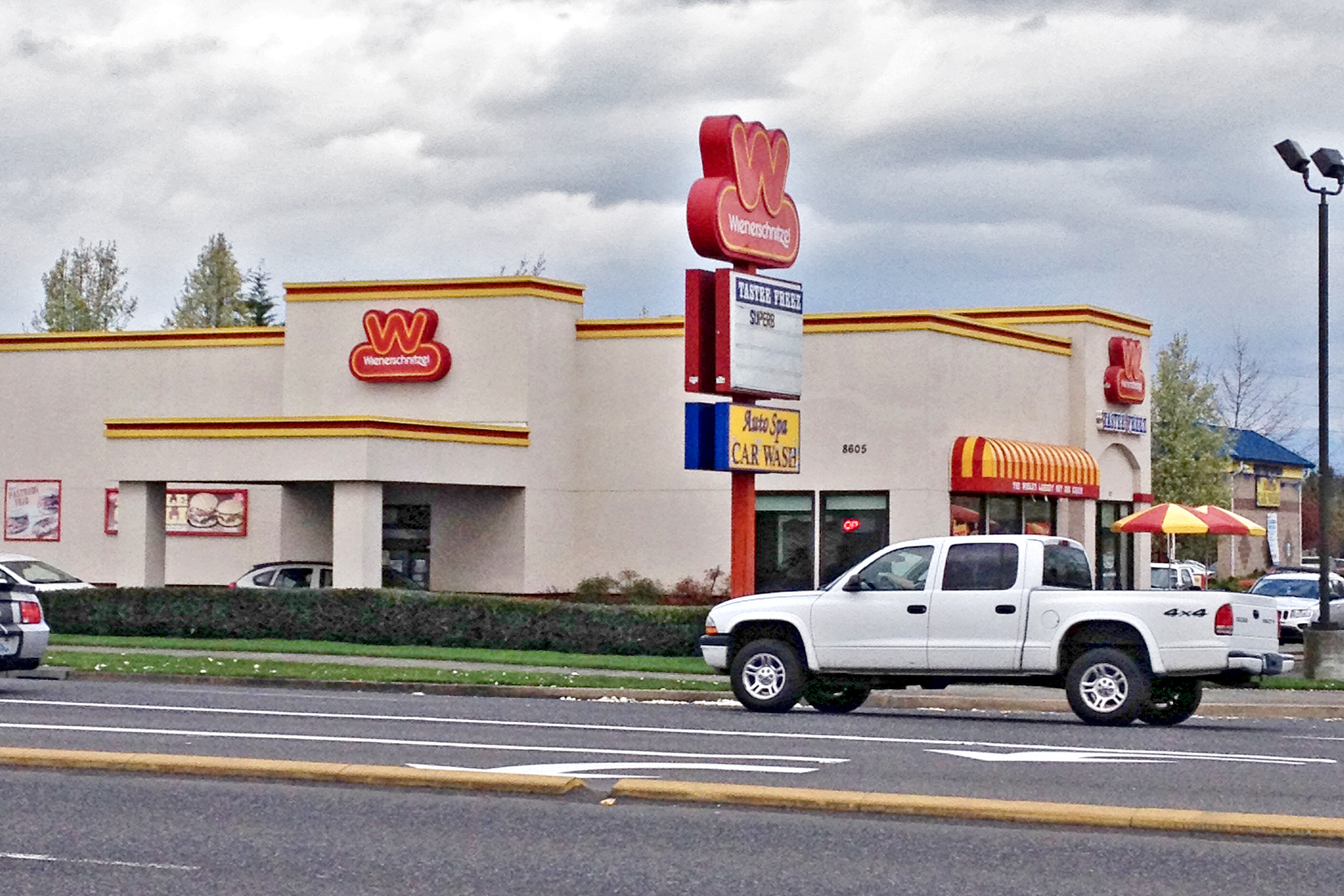
Wienerschnitzel located in Vancouver, Washington, closed in June 2015

== The Galardi Group ==
The Galardi Group
- Type: Private
- Industry: Restaurants
- Founded: 1970; 56 years ago
- Founder: John Galardi
- Headquarters: Irvine, California, U.S.
- Number of locations: 379 (January 2022)
- Key people: JR Galardi (CEO)
- Revenue: ▲US$501 million (2021)
- Owner: Galardi family
- Number of employees: 8,000 (2019)
- Subsidiaries: Wienerschnitzel; Tastee-Freez; Hamburger Stand
- Website: The Galardi Group

The Galardi Group, the parent company of Wienerschnitzel, Tastee-Freez, and Original Hamburger Stand, was formed by John Galardi in 1970.

In 1979, Wienerschnitzel attempted to expand its menus by adding hamburgers. With little success in the 1980s, the company established two chains in 1983, The Original Hamburger Stand and Weldon's Gourmet Hamburgers, which was cast off in the 1990s.

By 2003, The Galardi Group became a franchisee of Tastee-Freez and made its products available in Wienerschnitzel and Original Hamburger Stand. Due to increased sales, The Galardi Group later bought Tastee-Freez.

== In popular culture ==
The Descendents' song "Wienerschnitzel" from their 1981 release Fat EP takes the form of a satirical skit in which the band's frontman Milo Aukerman orders a meal from the restaurant.

In the Season 9 episode of The Simpsons titled "The Last Temptation of Krust", Krusty the Clown reinvents himself as an anti-capitalist, anti-consumerist and anti-commercialist comedian in the style of George Carlin. During a stand-up set criticising the use of deceased celebrities & public figures in advertising, he remarks "I do not believe Winston Churchill would eat at ‘Der Wienerschnitzel.’”

== See also ==
- List of hot dog restaurants
