= The List (The Office) =

- The Office episode
- Episode no.: Season 8 Episode 1
- Directed by: B. J. Novak
- Written by: B. J. Novak
- Cinematography by: Matt Sohn
- Editing by: David Rogers
- Production code: 802
- Original air date: September 22, 2011

Guest appearances
- Mark Proksch as Nate Nickerson

Episode chronology
← Previous "Search Committee"	Next → "The Incentive"
- The Office (American season 8)

"The List" is the eighth season premiere of the American comedy television series The Office, and the show's 153rd episode overall. The episode originally aired on NBC in the United States on September 22, 2011. It was written and directed by executive producer B. J. Novak.

The series—presented as if it were a real documentary—depicts the everyday lives of office employees in the Scranton, Pennsylvania, branch of the fictional Dunder Mifflin Paper Company. In the episode, new CEO Robert California (James Spader) writes a mysterious list that has a line down the middle and every member of the office on either one side or the other. The office members frantically try to figure out what it means, causing a crisis for new manager Andy Bernard.

"The List" was the first episode of The Office to feature James Spader's Robert California in a starring role. The episode received moderately positive reviews with many commenting that it proved the series could survive without Carell. According to Nielsen Media Research, "The List" drew an estimated 7.63 million viewers and received a 3.9 rating/10% share in the 18–49 demographic, making it, at the time, the lowest-rated season premiere since the first-season premiere.

== Synopsis ==
Jim Halpert explains to the camera that Robert California was appointed Regional Manager of the Scranton Branch, but on his first day traveled to Florida and convinced Jo Bennett to give him her position as CEO of Dunder Mifflin-Sabre. Robert then appointed Andy Bernard as Scranton Regional Manager in his place. Andy makes it his goal for the office to receive a half day off on the Friday before the Columbus Day weekend.

Robert accidentally leaves his personal notebook at Erin Hannon's desk, and she notices it contains a list of Scranton's employees on two columns with a line down the middle. Concerned about what the list means, the employees pressure Andy to ask Robert about it. Robert is offended by Andy's inquiry, assuming that he snooped through his notebook. While brushing the list off as "doodles," he conspicuously moves Andy's name from the left column to the right. Later that day, Robert invites the employees on the left column to lunch: Jim, Dwight Schrute, Darryl Philbin, Angela Martin, Kevin Malone, Phyllis Vance, Toby Flenderson and Oscar Martinez. After they leave, the "right-siders" try to console themselves with a pizza party, but remain despondent about their exclusion.

During lunch (which Toby decides to eventually leave), the "left-siders" pester Robert about the list. Slightly intoxicated, Robert informs them that the left-siders are "winners" while the right side are "losers". Jim is astonished, but the others become cocky. Kevin sends a mass text to the right-siders, mocking them as "losers", and later squirts Meredith Palmer with a water pistol. Andy does not like this and confronts Robert with a demand to alter the list. Robert refuses, and then speaks to everyone by admitting to calling certain members of the office losers, but also reprimanding them for fixating so much on someone else's opinion of them, saying he will be working with them a long time and that his opinions on certain people may very well change, finishing with "Winners, prove me right; losers, prove me wrong". The workers are satisfied, but Andy is not, and lists off the qualities the right-siders have, stating that: Stanley Hudson may be a “lazy grump”, he but has the best sales record in the office (something Robert admits to being unaware of); Meredith is persistent and the word "no" is not in her vocabulary; and Pam Halpert is "easily the most creative and kind person [he has] ever worked with". Andy concedes to Robert that putting Gabe Lewis in the losers' column was "astute". He then demands the Columbus half day and exits, prompting a respecting smile from Robert. Though the office annually gets the half day in any case, they happily wish him good evening as they depart, and Andy looks very pleased with his work as the boss.

Pam is pregnant with her and Jim's second child (revealed to be a boy) and is emotional, easily brought to tears throughout the day. Angela is also pregnant, having married the state senator Robert Lipton over the summer, and says that she's "Little Preg" to Pam's "Big Preg". When Jim picks up his things to leave for the day, he "accidentally" drops a piece of paper. Pam picks it up and sees Jim's personal winners and losers list: Pam, Cece and their new baby are on the left, and the words "everything else" is written on the right. Pam tearfully vows to frame it.

== Production ==
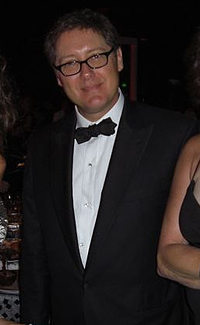
"The List" marked James Spader's first appearance as a regular on The Office.

The episode was written and directed by executive producer B. J. Novak, who also portrays Ryan Howard in the series. It is Novak's fourteenth writing credit and third directing credit for the series. "The List", which commenced filming on July 25, 2011, served to redefine and reorient The Office, as the series's former lead actor Steve Carell had left the show following the previous season's twenty-second episode, "Goodbye, Michael". The plot of this episode is furthermore a continuation of and a resolution to the plot of the seventh season finale "Search Committee", wherein several potential candidates (most of whom were played by guest actors) appeared, but no definitive decision as to who would become the new manager was offered.

On June 27, 2011, co-creator and executive producer Ricky Gervais announced that James Spader was to join the cast on a permanent basis. Spader subsequently appeared in this episode, having previously made a cameo in the aforementioned seventh season finale. He would go on to appear in 15 of the eighth's seasons episodes, and throughout the season he served as a replacement for Jo Bennett, the former CEO of Sabre (who was portrayed by Kathy Bates, who had left the series due to her commitment for the NBC drama series, Harry's Law). In addition to Spader joining the cast, "The List" also revealed that Andy (portrayed by Ed Helms) would ascend to the position of manager; the series' executive Producer and showrunner Paul Lieberstein revealed this information to Ed Helms during lunch in June. Prior to their decision, the writers had gone through the main contenders for the job, Darryl, Dwight and Andy, and concluded that Andy would be the best choice. Finally, this episode opens with the announcement that Pam is pregnant with her second child. Pam's pregnancy was written into the show so as to correspond with Jenna Fischer's real-life pregnancy.

The Season Eight DVD contains a number of deleted scenes from this episode. Notable cut scenes include Ryan explaining where trends comes from and Gabe explaining why he's back in a talking head, Andy attempting to calm everybody down while they try to figure out what the list means, and more scenes with the winner's lunch and the loser's pizza party.

== Cultural references ==
The cold open features multiple workers "planking", an activity consisting of lying face down in an unusual or incongruous location. Throughout the episode, Pam is seen crying at a commercial for The Travelers Companies featuring a dog trying to keep his dog bone safe.

== Reception ==
=== Ratings ===
In its original American broadcast on September 22, 2011, "The List" was viewed by an estimated 7.63 million viewers and received a 3.9 rating/10% share among adults between the ages of 18 and 49. This means that it was seen by 3.9% of all 18- to 49-year-olds, and 10% of all 18- to 49-year-olds watching television at the time of the broadcast. This marked an 11 percent fall in the demographic from the seventh-season premiere, "Nepotism", making it the lowest-rated season premiere. It was also the last episode of The Office to be viewed by more than 7 million viewers. The episode ranked second in its timeslot beating Person of Interest which received a 3.1 rating/8% share in the 18–49 demographic and The Secret Circle which received a 0.9 rating/2% share, but was defeated by The X Factor which received a 4.4 rating/11% share and tied with Grey's Anatomy which received a 3.9 rating/10% share. "The List" was the twenty-second most-watched show for the week of broadcast among adults aged 18–49.

=== Reviews ===
The curse of recent seasons of The Office has been unevenness, so until they've made it through a few episodes, it's tough to give a diagnosis of the post-Carell show. But that was about as good a first outing as they could have hoped to have.

— Linda Holmes, NPR

"The List" received moderately positive reviews. Myles McNutt of The A.V. Club awarded the episode a "B" and wrote that the entry "was about on par with what the show was delivering last season." He was slightly critical of the episode's tone, noting that it "eschew[ed] subtlety" and, instead, yielded, "a thesis statement for the transitional season to come". HitFix reviewer Alan Sepinwall complimented the final scene featuring Andy confronting Robert calling it "sweet and felt genuine, in the way that made the show's early days feel special." Despite this, he said the "story fell a little flat."

Linda Holmes of NPR praised the choice of adding James Spader, making Andy the manager, and praised the writers for differentiating Andy as manager from Michael. IGN writer Cindy White praised the episode for being an "ensemble affair" writing that "And when you've got an ensemble this strong, that's a smart way to go". She concluded that "In context with the rest of NBC's hilarious Thursday-night lineup ... The Office can't help but seem a little long in the tooth. But you can always rely on it for at least a few laugh-out-loud moments ... I'm not ready to call time of death on this show just yet. She ultimately gave the episode an 8.0/10. TV Guide writers Joyce Eng and Kate Stanhope called the promotion of Andy as manager the third best television moment of the week. James Poniewozik of Time gave the episode a positive review commenting that "it at least showed that a season 8 Office is capable of delivering the funny as well as the character grace notes".
