= June Martino =

American businesswoman (1917–2005)

June Martino (August 10, 1917 – January 29, 2005) was an American businesswoman who became Ray Kroc's bookkeeper in 1948 and ultimately rose to Corporate Secretary, Treasurer, Director and part-owner of McDonald's Corporation.

== Early and personal life ==
Martino, a native of Chicago, was married to Louis Martino, who owned and operated an early McDonald's restaurant in Glen Ellyn, Illinois, established the company's original research facility in Addison, Illinois in 1961 and preceded June in death. The Martinos had two sons, John and Joel.

== Ray Kroc's bookkeeper ==
Having moved their family to a farm in Wisconsin when their parents grew ill after the war, June returned to Chicago to look for work in 1948. That's when she met Ray Kroc, who was looking for a bookkeeper to help handle his growing Multimixer milkshake business.

"She had a presence that conveyed integrity and a restless native ability to deal with problems," Ray recalled in his book, Grinding It Out. "This was enveloped in a warm, compassionate personality, a rare combination of traits. The fact that she had no bookkeeping experience bothered me not at all. I knew she would master the technical routines quickly."

By 1955, Martino was doing double duty after Kroc opened his first McDonald's restaurant in Des Plaines, Illinois – running his Prince Castle sales operation for multimixers as well as the fledgling McDonald's Systems office. When a young man dropped by the office selling bibles, Martino instead converted him and his wife into McDonald's franchisees. Thus, Sandy and Betty Agate became successful franchisees in Waukegan, Illinois, whose operation was soon a model for others to follow.

In the early years, Martino opened her home to struggling franchisees visiting headquarters in Chicago and delivered advice to corporate staffers going through personal or family problems. Even though she had two sons of her own, she always had time for others.

== Talent scout ==
Many of McDonald's early employees had their first screening as prospects by June Martino. Kroc hired Jim Schindler, McDonald's first construction engineer and equipment designer and his second corporate office employee, on Martino's direct recommendation. Other times, Martino was more subtle. When two life insurance salesmen, Robert B. Ryan and Richard Boylan, walked into McDonald's office in 1957, Martino recognized their potential after learning they both had law degrees and had been accountants with the IRS. So she got them in the door with Harry Sonneborn, Kroc's finance manager, by telling him they were IRS agents and, after interviewing them, Sonneborn hired them both. Robert Ryan served as McDonald's treasurer and Richard Boylan retired in 1983 as senior executive vice president and chief financial officer. Martino also liked the attitude of a college friend of one of her sons and hired him as a part-time worker in McDonald's mail room. Mike Quinlan would ultimately rise through the ranks to become McDonald's third Chief Executive Officer, serving from 1989 through 1998.

Martino played a critically important role in balancing the diverse viewpoints of McDonald's strong-minded managers, especially when Kroc and Sonneborn found themselves at odds over the direction of the business. For two years before Sonneborn resigned in 1967, the two men never talked to each other, communicating instead exclusively through Martino.

== McDonald's den mother ==
As John Love described it in Behind the Arches: "Simply put, Martino was a den mother to McDonald's young managers. And while she got little formal recognition for that role, it made her perhaps the only universally liked executive in McDonald's."

Kroc himself fully appreciated Martino's key role in the company and her loyalty in working long hours for little pay in the early years, rewarding her with an equity interest in the company.

Thus, when McDonald's went public in 1965, Martino cashed in $300,000 of her holdings (equivalent to $2.3 million in 2018) and her remaining holdings were worth $5 million (or about $39.8 million in 2018). When McDonald's was listed on the New York Stock Exchange the following year, Martino became the first woman to be a guest in the all-male NYSE directors dining room since Queen Elizabeth.

Martino retired from McDonald's in 1968, but continued to serve as an Honorary Director of the Board of Directors until her death. She died in the early morning hours of January 29, 2005 in West Palm Beach, Florida.
