= B. J. Novak =

American actor (born 1979)

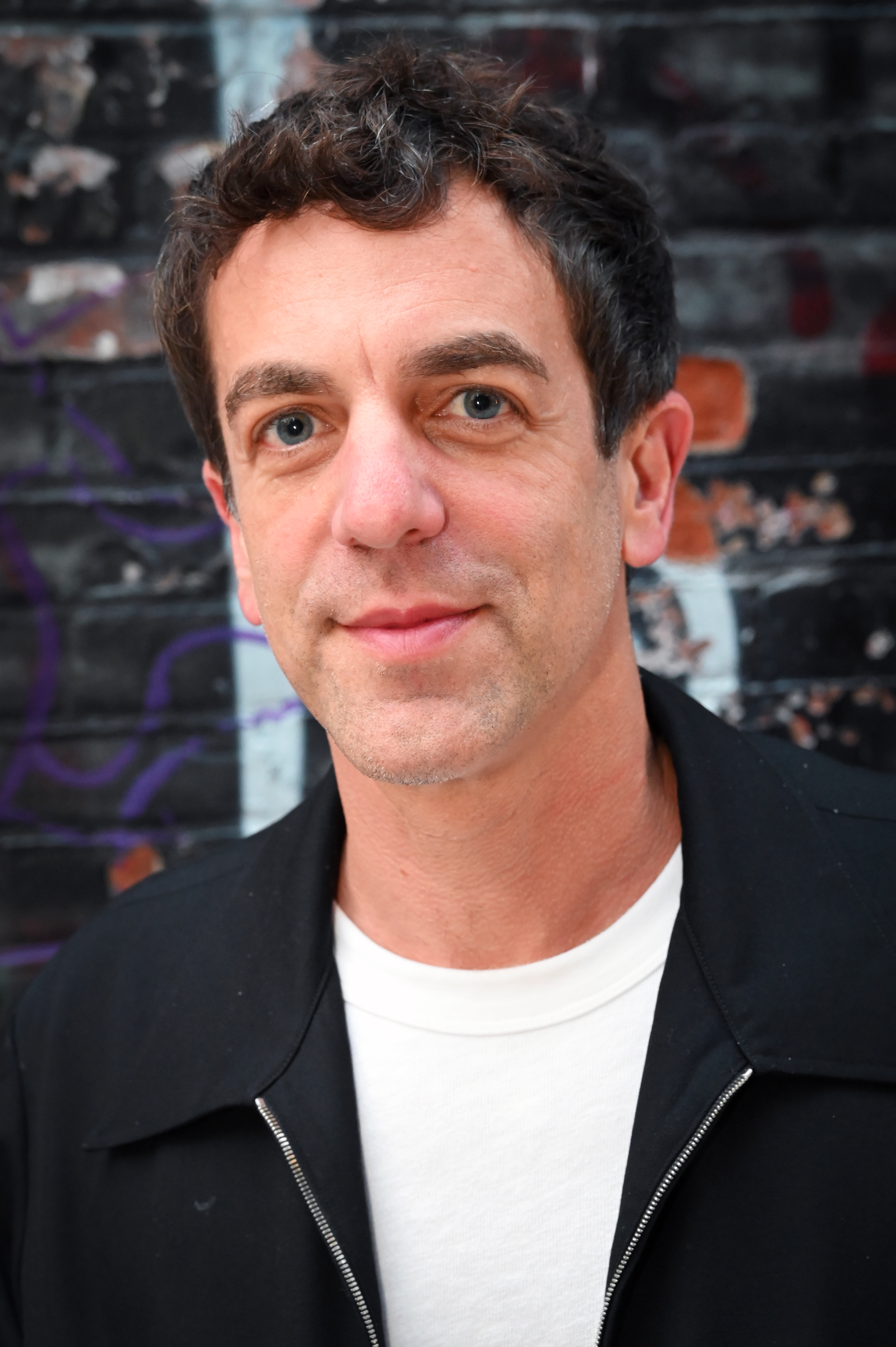
- Novak in 2025
- Born: Benjamin Joseph Manaly Novak; July 31, 1979 (age 47); Newton, Massachusetts, U.S.
- Education: Harvard University (AB)
- Occupations: Actor; comedian; writer; author; producer
- Years active: 2001–present
- Father: William Novak
- Relatives: Jesse Novak (brother)

Benjamin Joseph Manaly Novak (born July 31, 1979) is an American actor, comedian, screenwriter, author, and producer. He gained traction as a comedian during the early 2000s before becoming an actor for the MTV reality prank show Punk'd (2003).

Novak had his breakout with a main role as Ryan Howard on seasons 1–8 of the NBC mockumentary sitcom The Office (2005–2013). His acting, writing and producing for the show earned him two Screen Actors Guild Awards and a Writers Guild of America Award, alongside five nominations for the Primetime Emmy Award for Outstanding Comedy Series.

In the late 2000s, Novak had supporting roles in the films Reign Over Me (2007) and Inglourious Basterds (2009). In the 2010s, he portrayed musician Robert B. Sherman in Saving Mr. Banks (2013) and Marvel Comics character Alistair Smythe in The Amazing Spider-Man 2 (2014). He had a starring role as Harry J. Sonneborn in the biographical film The Founder (2016) and voiced Baker Smurf in The Smurfs (2011) and The Smurfs 2 (2013). In television, he had a recurring role as Lucas Pruit on the HBO series The Newsroom (2014).

In the 2020s, Novak created and wrote the FX on Hulu anthology series The Premise (2021). He made his film directorial debut with Vengeance (2022), which he also produced and starred in. He also appears in a supporting role in The Devil Wears Prada 2 (2026), in which he plays Jay Ravitz, the son of the Runway chairman Irv Ravitz.

In addition to his film and television career, Novak authored the books One More Thing: Stories and Other Stories (2014) and The Book with No Pictures (2014).

== Early life ==
Novak was born on July 31, 1979, at Newton-Wellesley Hospital in Newton, Massachusetts, a suburb of Boston. His parents are Linda (née Manaly) and author William Novak. He is Jewish. His father co-edited The Big Book of Jewish Humor, and has ghostwritten memoirs for Nancy Reagan, Lee Iacocca, Magic Johnson and others. Novak has two brothers: Lev Novak and composer Jesse Novak.

He attended Solomon Schechter Day School of Greater Boston and Brown Middle School. He went to Camp Ramah in New England in Massachusetts in the summers of his 6th, 7th and 9th grades.

He attended Newton South High School with future The Office costar John Krasinski; they graduated in 1997. Novak edited one of the school newspapers, The Lion's Roar, and cowrote a satirical play with Krasinski.

During high school, Novak was friends with Costin Alamariu, and they both worked for Newton South High School's newspaper. The two of them, along with Peter Owen Nelson, and Novak's brother pranked visitors at the Museum of Fine Arts by replacing the real guided tour with a phony tour narrated by Alamariu which slowly but steadily became more surreal and profanity laden. Novak admitted to the prank in 2011 at a fundraiser for his high school and was officially forgiven by the MFA in 2024.

Novak graduated from Harvard University in 2001, where he was a member of the Harvard Lampoon. He majored in English and Spanish literature, and wrote his honors thesis on the films of Shakespeare's Hamlet. Aside from the Lampoon, he occasionally staged and performed in a variety show called The B.J. Show with fellow Harvard student B. J. Averell.

== Career ==
After Harvard, Novak moved to Los Angeles, California and began working in clubs as a comedian. His first live stand-up performance was at the Hollywood Youth Hostel on October 10, 2001. He was named one of Variety's "Ten Comedians To Watch" in 2003.

He was a writer for the short-lived The WB sitcom Raising Dad. He performed on Comedy Central's Premium Blend and on Late Night with Conan O'Brien.

Novak's television acting career began on MTV's Punk'd. He was the lead accomplice to Ashton Kutcher on the show's second season in 2003, playing pranks on Hilary Duff, Rachael Leigh Cook, Usher and Mýa.

An image of Novak entered the public domain as a stock photo and has been used on various international products, reportedly including a particular type of Calvin Klein cologne in Sweden.

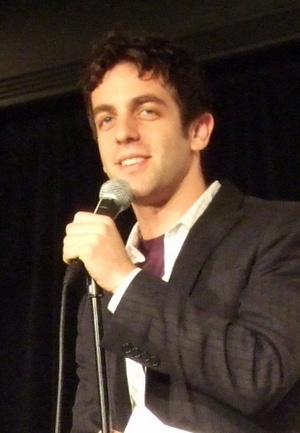
Novak in June 2007

=== The Office ===
After hearing Novak's opening joke at a comedy club, executive producer Greg Daniels decided he "wanted to do something with him." Novak was subsequently cast as Ryan Howard, who is introduced on the show as a temporary employee at Dunder Mifflin in Scranton, Pennsylvania. Novak's character goes through ups and downs throughout his work career and has an on-and-off relationship with Kelly Kapoor (Mindy Kaling).

Novak was also a producer and writer on the show; he and Kaling, Greg Daniels, Michael Schur and Paul Lieberstein were its original writers. Novak is credited with writing 15 episodes, including the Writers Guild of America nominated episodes "Diversity Day" and "Local Ad". Novak and his fellow writers and producers were nominated five consecutive times for the Primetime Emmy Award for Outstanding Comedy Series, from 2007 to 2011.

On July 21, 2010, news reports indicated Novak had signed a contract to remain with the show for its seventh and eighth seasons. Under the new terms, he would be made an executive producer midway through season 7, and would direct two episodes. He left The Office after the ninth-season premiere, "New Guys", but returned to guest-star in the series finale. In a 2021 podcast interview on Dax Shepard's show, he confirmed that he had been offered the season 9 showrunner position, but declined it because he decided that his "fire for the job had burned out", and it was time for him to move on to other projects.

In a June 2009 interview with The Philadelphia Inquirer, Novak spoke about sharing the success of The Office with his Newton South High School classmate John Krasinski:

Sometimes when this feels too good to be true, I think that if this were all a dream, that would be what should have tipped me off. I'd wake up saying, "I was in this incredible TV show and it was a big hit and the star was John [Krasinski] from high school. Isn't that weird?"

=== Post-The Office career ===
Novak has had supporting roles in Quentin Tarantino's 2009 war film Inglourious Basterds, John Lee Hancock's 2013 period drama Saving Mr. Banks about the development of the 1964 film Mary Poppins, and Hancock's 2016 biographical drama The Founder about the founder of McDonald's.

He has also appeared in the films Unaccompanied Minors (2006), Knocked Up (2007), Reign Over Me (2007), The Internship (2013) and The Amazing Spider-Man 2 (2014).

He voiced Baker Smurf in The Smurfs (2011) and The Smurfs 2 (2013).

He has starred in a few episodes each of The Mindy Project and The Newsroom, and made cameo appearances on Community and Crazy Ex-Girlfriend. He was also a consulting producer for the first season of The Mindy Project.

He wrote, directed and executive-produced a half-hour anthological series, The Premise, released on FX in 2021. He starred in the 2022 mystery-thriller Vengeance, which he also wrote and directed. Filming began in March 2020 but was delayed due to the COVID-19 pandemic until January 2021. In May 2020, it was announced that he would write and executive-produce Young People for HBO Max.

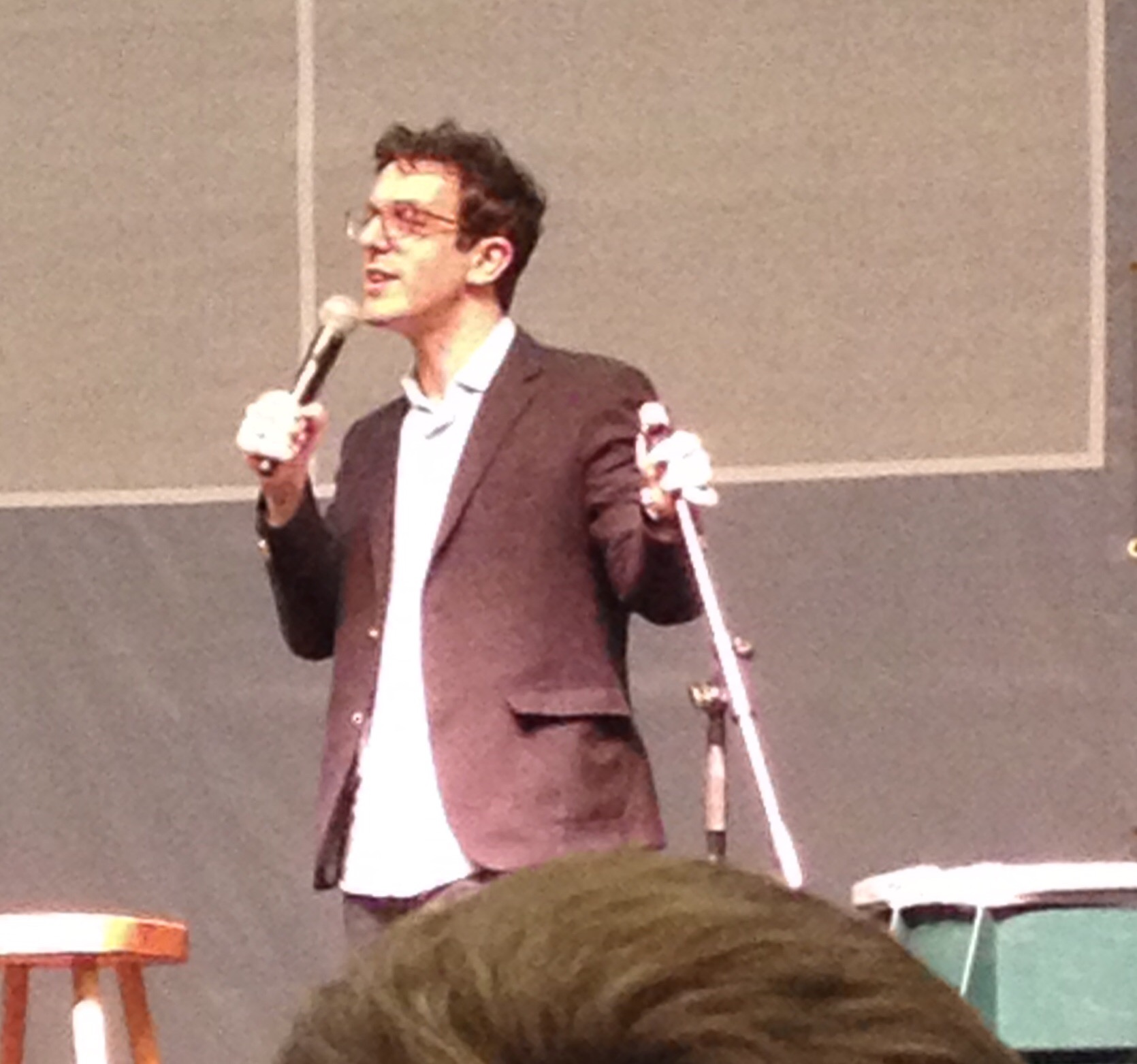
Novak in September 2013

=== Book deal ===
On April 11, 2013, publishing house Alfred A. Knopf announced it had signed a seven-figure, two-book deal with Novak, with the first book to be a collection of Woody Allen-like fiction stories. On February 4, 2014, a book of 64 stories, One More Thing: Stories and Other Stories, was published and spent 6 weeks on the New York Times Best Sellers Hardcover Fiction List.

Novak also signed a deal with Penguin's children's books label and wrote The Book with No Pictures, released on September 30, 2014. As of January 2021, it had spent 174 weeks on the New York Times Best Seller Picture Books List, with 34 weeks at #1, and was at #10 in September 2020. A self-proclaimed lifelong book-lover, Novak said he wrote the children's book partially because "to me, there is no more meaningful, important or exciting rule to introduce to children than the power of the written word."

On November 19, 2019, My Book with No Pictures was published as a fill-in-the-blanks companion book to The Book with No Pictures to allow children to write their own stories.

=== The List App ===
On October 14, 2015, Novak released an Apple iOS app along with co-founder Dev Flaherty called The List App. The app allowed users to make lists. Its FAQ page said "we just love lists. They're the best." It was nominated for a Webby Award (losing in its category to Beme and Pocket) in 2016. In May 2016, it was rebranded 'li.st' and became available on the Android platform. In September 2017, it was shut down due to lack of users.

== Personal life ==
Novak has a close friendship with Mindy Kaling, whom he met through writing for The Office, and called her "the most important person in my life" (on Fresh Air with Terry Gross). They dated on and off while writing and acting on the show, sometimes mirroring the on-again, off-again relationship between their characters Ryan Howard and Kelly Kapoor. He is the godfather of Kaling's first two children.

Novak lives in Los Angeles.

== Filmography ==
Key
†	Denotes works that have not yet been released

=== Film ===
==== Acting credits ====
Year	Title	Role	Notes
2006	Unaccompanied Minors	Flight Attendant	
2007	Knocked Up	Unnamed Doctor	
2007	Reign Over Me	Mr. Fallon	
2009	Inglourious Basterds	Pfc. Smithson Utivich	
2011	The Smurfs	Baker Smurf	Voice
2012	The Dictator		Uncredited
2013	The Internship	Male Interviewer	
2013	The Smurfs 2	Baker Smurf	Voice
2013	Saving Mr. Banks	Robert B. Sherman	
2014	The Amazing Spider-Man 2	Alistair Smythe	
2016	The Founder	Harry J. Sonneborn	
2021	Melinda's Wish	Bruce	Voice; short film
2022	Vengeance	Ben Manalowitz	Also writer and director
2026	The Devil Wears Prada 2	Jay Ravitz	

=== Television ===
==== Acting credits ====
Year	Title	Role	Notes
2003	Punk'd	Field Agent	5 episodes
2004	Premium Blend	Himself	Season 7, Stand-up
2005–2013	The Office	Ryan Howard	166 episodes
2013–2016	The Mindy Project	Jamie	5 episodes
2014	Community	Mr. Egypt	Episode: "Basic Sandwich"
2014	The Newsroom	Lucas Pruit	4 episodes
2015	Arthur	MC	Voice; episode: "The Last Day"
2016; 2018	Crazy Ex-Girlfriend	Himself	2 episodes
2020	Home Movie: The Princess Bride	Count Rugen	Episode: "Chapter Six: The Fire Swamp"
2023	Celebrity Jeopardy!	Himself	Contestant
2023	Lessons in Chemistry	Six-Thirty	Voice; episode: "Living Dead Things"
2025	Poker Face	Hiram Lubinski	Episode: "Hometown Hero"

==== Writing credits ====
Year	Title	Notes
2001–2002	Raising Dad	Episodes written: 1. Season 1, Episode 5 – "Fight for Your Right to Party" (November 2, 2001); 2. Season 1, Episode 13 – "Mentor Matt" (February 1, 2002)
2005–2012	The Office	Episodes written: 1. Season 1, Episode 2 – "Diversity Day" (March 29, 2005); 2. Season 2, Episode 2 – "Sexual Harassment" (September 27, 2005); 3. Season 2, Episode 4 – "The Fire" (October 11, 2005); 4. Season 2, Episode 15 – "Boys and Girls" (February 2, 2006); 5. Season 3, Episode 5 – "Initiation" (October 19, 2006); 6. Season 3, Episode 20 – "Safety Training" (April 12, 2007); 7. Season 4, Episode 9 – "Local Ad" (October 25, 2007); 8. Season 4, Episode 14 – "Chair Model" (April 17, 2008); 9. Season 5, Episode 13 – "Prince Family Paper" (January 22, 2009); 10. Season 5, Episode 22 – "Dream Team" (April 9, 2009); 11. Season 6, Episode 21 – "Happy Hour" (March 25, 2010); 12. Season 7, Episode 2 – "Counseling" (September 30, 2010); 13. Season 7, Episode 17 – "Threat Level Midnight" (February 17, 2011); 14. Season 8, Episode 1 – "The List" (September 22, 2011); 15. Season 8, Episode 24 – "Free Family Portrait Studio" (May 10, 2012); Writers Guild of America Award for Comedy Series (2006); Nominated — Writers Guild of America Award for a Comedy Series (2005, 2007–2010); Nominated — Writers Guild of America Award for a New Series (2005); Nominated — Writers Guild of America Award for an Episodic Comedy (2005, 2007)
2013	The Mindy Project	Episodes written: 1. Season 1, Episode 13 – "Harry & Sally" (January 29, 2013); Nominated: Writers Guild of America Award for a New Series (2012)
2021	The Premise	Episodes written: 1. Season 1, Episode 1 – "Social Justice Sex Tape" (September 16, 2021); 2. Season 1, Episode 2 – "Moment of Silence" (September 16, 2021); 3. Season 1, Episode 3 – "The Ballad of Jesse Wheeler" (September 23, 2021); 4. Season 1, Episode 4 – "The Commenter" (September 30, 2021); 5. Season 1, Episode 5 – "Butt Plug" (October 7, 2021)

==== Directing credits ====
Year	Title	Season	Episode	Title	Airdate	Notes
2009	The Office: Blackmail		Episode 1	"Oscar"	May 7, 2009	Webisodes
2009	The Office: Blackmail		Episode 2	"Andy"	May 7, 2009	Webisodes
2009	The Office: Blackmail		Episode 3	"Kelly"	May 7, 2009	Webisodes
2009	The Office: Blackmail		Episode 4	"Pay Day"	May 7, 2009	Webisodes
2009	The Office	Season 6	Episode 12	"Scott's Tots"	December 3, 2009	
2011	The Office	Season 7	Episode 14	"The Seminar"	January 27, 2011	
2011	The Office	Season 8	Episode 1	"The List"	September 22, 2011	
2012	The Office	Season 8	Episode 11	"Trivia"	January 12, 2012	
2012	The Office	Season 8	Episode 24	"Free Family Portrait Studio"	May 10, 2012	
2013	The Mindy Project	Season 1	Episode 15	"Mindy's Minute"	February 19, 2013	
2013	The Mindy Project	Season 1	Episode 21	"Santa Fe"	April 9, 2013	
2021	The Premise	Season 1	Episode 2	"Moment of Silence"	September 16, 2021	
2021	The Premise	Season 1	Episode 3	"The Ballad of Jesse Wheeler"	September 23, 2021	

== Bibliography ==
=== Books ===
- Novak, B. J. (February 4, 2014). One More Thing: Stories and Other Stories. Knopf Doubleday Publishing Group. ISBN 9780385351836.
- Novak, B. J. (September 30, 2014). The Book with No Pictures. Dial Books. ISBN 9780803741713.
- Novak, B. J. (November 19, 2019). My Book with No Pictures. Dial Books. ISBN 9780593111017.

=== Essays, reporting and other contributions ===
==== Publications ====
- Novak, B. J. (1998). "My Unhappy Rendezvous with Magical Realism". The Harvard Lampoon.
- Novak, B. J. (November 4, 2013). "The man who invented the calendar". Shouts & Murmurs. The New Yorker. Vol. 89, no. 35. pp. 64–65.
- Novak, B. J. (November 28, 2013). "Kellogg's". Nautilus (7).
- Novak, B. J. (December 30, 2013). "A Good Problem to Have". One Story (187).
- Novak, B. J. (January 16, 2014). "Kellogg's". Nautilus (9).
- Novak, B. J. (March 2014). "Julie And The Warlord". Playboy.
- Novak, B. J. (November 2020). "My Unhappy Rendezvous with Magical Realism". The Harvard Lampoon. Archived from the original on February 9, 2021.
- Novak, B. J. (November 2020). "Gag Gifts". The Harvard Lampoon. Archived from the original on February 9, 2021.

Novak also has a chapter giving advice in Tim Ferriss' book Tools of Titans.

==== Instagram Live ====
- Current Mood with John Mayer (February 17, 2019). "Pants".
- Special Report on Current Mood with John Mayer (April 19, 2020). "Coronavirus".

==== Podcast appearances ====
- Weird Adults with Little Esther (December 17, 2012). "32. BJ Novak" (Podcast).
- Id10t with Chris Hardwick (February 3, 2014). "B.J. Novak" (Podcast).
- Ron Bennington Interviews (February 6, 2014). "Unmasked with B.J. Novak" (Podcast).
- The Hollywood Handbook (May 13, 2014). "32. B.J. Novak, Our Close Friend" (Podcast).
- The Tim Ferriss Show (November 25, 2015). "#121: BJ Novak of The Office on Creative Process, Handling Rejection, and Good Comedy" (Podcast).
- Decoder with Nilay Patel (November 25, 2015). "Recode Decode: B.J. Novak and Dev Flaherty, The List App Co-Founders" (Podcast).
- Exactly (January 6, 2017). "BJ Novak: Why Does Dark Comedy Work?" (Podcast).
- The Great Debates (December 20, 2018). "309 — Our Traditional Holiday Gathering With BJ & John" (Podcast).
- The Great Debates (December 25, 2019). "Holiday Special 2019 with Special Guests" (Podcast).
- You Made It Weird with Pete Holmes (January 29, 2020). "B.J. Novak" (Podcast).
- LA Podcast (April 24, 2020). "FREE SAMPLE: The Ten, Episode 1 - BJ Novak" (Podcast).
- Office Ladies (June 24, 2020). "Initiation w/ B.J. Novak and Rainn Wilson" (Podcast).
- The Great Debates (December 31, 2020). "511 - 2020 Holiday Special" (Podcast).

== Awards and nominations ==
List of awards and nominations
Year	Group	Award	Work	Result
2005	Writers Guild of America Awards	New Series	The Office	Nominated
2005	Writers Guild of America Awards	Episodic Comedy – for episode "Diversity Day"	The Office	Nominated
2005	Writers Guild of America Awards	Comedy Series	The Office	Nominated
2006	Screen Actors Guild Awards	Outstanding Performance by an Ensemble in a Comedy Series	The Office	Won
2006	Writers Guild of America Awards	Comedy Series	The Office	Won
2007	Screen Actors Guild Awards	Outstanding Performance by an Ensemble in a Comedy Series	The Office	Won
2007	Emmy Awards	Outstanding Comedy Series	The Office	Nominated
2007	Writers Guild of America Awards	Episodic Comedy – for episode "Local Ad"	The Office	Nominated
2007	Writers Guild of America Awards	Comedy Series	The Office	Nominated
2008	Screen Actors Guild Awards	Outstanding Performance by an Ensemble in a Comedy Series	The Office	Nominated
2008	Emmy Awards	Outstanding Comedy Series	The Office	Nominated
2008	Writers Guild of America Awards	Comedy Series	The Office	Nominated
2009	Screen Actors Guild Awards	Outstanding Performance by an Ensemble in a Comedy Series	The Office	Nominated
2009	Emmy Awards	Outstanding Comedy Series	The Office	Nominated
2009	Writers Guild of America Awards	Comedy Series	The Office	Nominated
2009	Prism Award	Performance in a Comedy Series	The Office	Nominated
2010	Screen Actors Guild Awards	Outstanding Performance by an Ensemble in a Comedy Series	The Office	Nominated
2010	Emmy Awards	Outstanding Comedy Series	The Office	Nominated
2010	Writers Guild of America Awards	Comedy Series	The Office	Nominated
2011	Screen Actors Guild Awards	Outstanding Performance by an Ensemble in a Comedy Series	The Office	Nominated
2011	Emmy Awards	Outstanding Comedy Series	The Office	Nominated
2012	Screen Actors Guild Awards	Outstanding Performance by an Ensemble in a Comedy Series	The Office	Nominated
2012	Writers Guild of America Awards	New Series	The Mindy Project	Nominated
