= Tastee-Freez =

American fast-food restaurant chain

- Type: Private
- Industry: Restaurants
- Founded: 1950; 76 years ago Joliet, Illinois, U.S.
- Founder: Leo S. Maranz; Harry Axene
- Headquarters: Newport Beach, California, U.S.
- Number of locations: 1
- Products: Fast food (including hamburgers, french fries, and milkshakes)
- Parent: The Galardi Group
- Website: tastee-freez.com

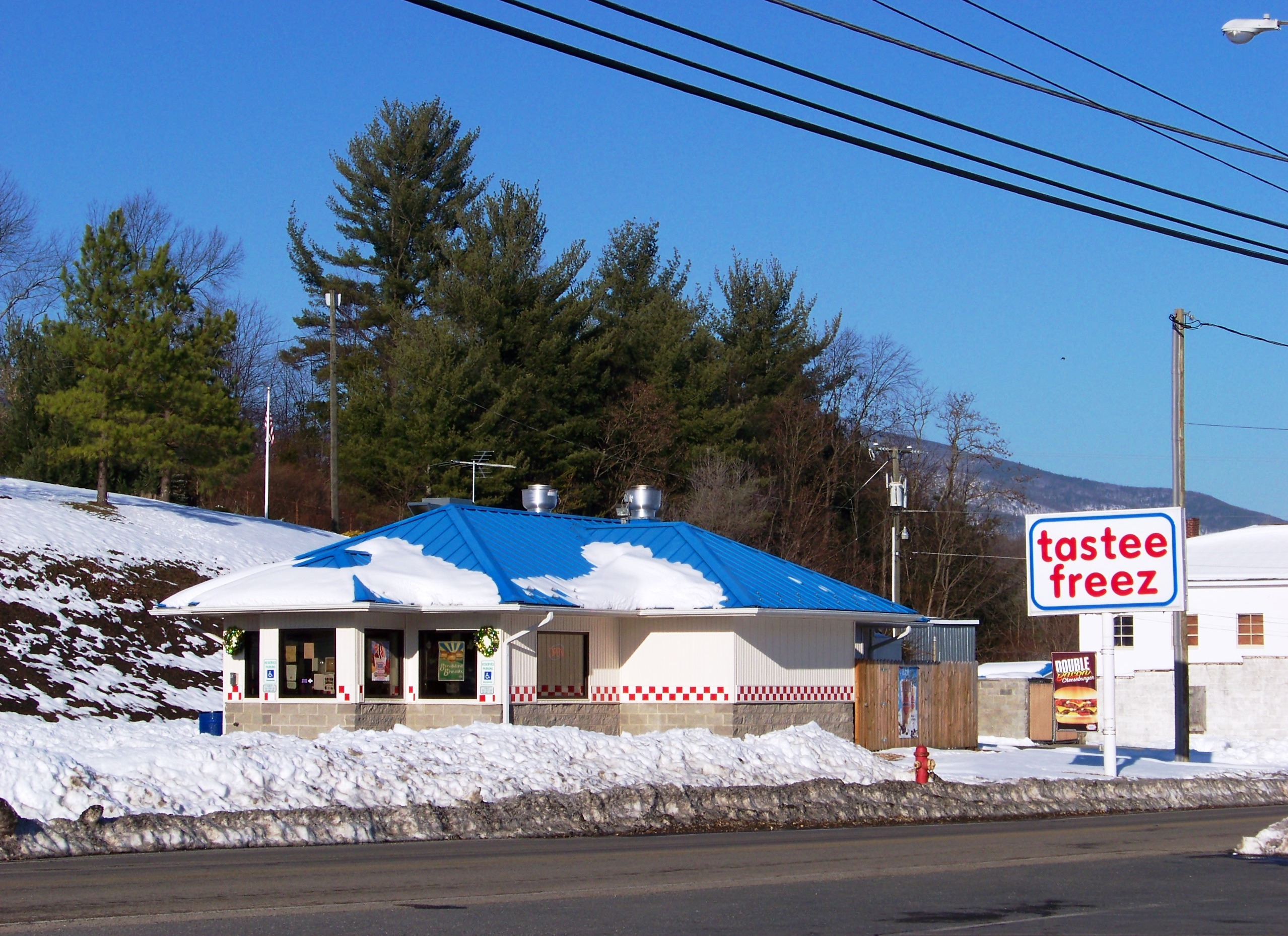
A former Tastee-Freez location in Craigsville, Virginia

Tastee-Freez is an American franchised fast-food restaurant specializing in soft serve ice cream. The first Tastee-Freez was established in Keithsburg, Illinois and is now part of the Wienerschnitzel and Hamburger Stand franchise brand headquartered in Tustin, California with roughly 350 locations nationally.

== History ==
Tastee-Freez was founded in 1950 in Joliet, Illinois, by Leo S. Maranz and Harry Axene (formerly of Dairy Queen). Maranz invented a soft serve pump and freezer which enabled the product, and their Harlee Manufacturing Company (a portmanteau of Harry and Leo) produced the machines which franchisees would buy and use in their respective locations. Originally stores focused on ice milk and other frozen dairy-based desserts. Expansion of the brand was rapid in the 1950s; in 1952, there were 315 locations, more than 1,600 by mid-1956, and by 1957, there were nearly 1,800 locations. The chain attempted to expand into England in the early 1960s where they began selling their products out of ice cream trucks. This business model was also attempted in the United States but proved so financially unsuccessful that Tastee-Freez filed for chapter 11 bankruptcy in late 1963. Herbert Molner, then an assistant of Maranz, bought the chain out of bankruptcy a year later. He began a renovation plan that included a withdrawal from England, closure of older stores in smaller towns, and revitalization of the menu to include fast food items such as hot dogs and hamburgers.

In 1982, Tastee-Freez was sold to the Denovo Corporation of Utica, Michigan, which also owned the Stewart's Restaurants and root beer, Dog n Suds root beer and drive-ins and B&K Rootbeer drive-ins, and Dairy Isle ice cream shops. In 1992, there were 340 locations.

By 2003, the Galardi Group became a franchisee of Tastee-Freez and made Tastee-Freez products available in its restaurants, Wienerschnitzel and Original Hamburger Stand. The Galardi Group was so pleased with the increased sales at its restaurant that it bought the Tastee-Freez company that year.

By 2026, all but one of Tastee-Freez's locations had closed. The sole location in Alaska has its own website.

As of November 2026, Tastee-Freez's website is defunct, and now redirects to Wienerschnitzel's website instead.
