= Azilia (disambiguation) =

Azilia may refer to:

- Azilia, a genus of orb-weaver spiders
- Azilia (plant), a genus of flowering plants
- The Margravate of Azilia, a failed British colonization plan for what would later become the colony of Georgia
