= Golden Isles of Georgia =

Islands along the coast of the US state of Georgia

Golden Isles
- Golden Isles, Georgia
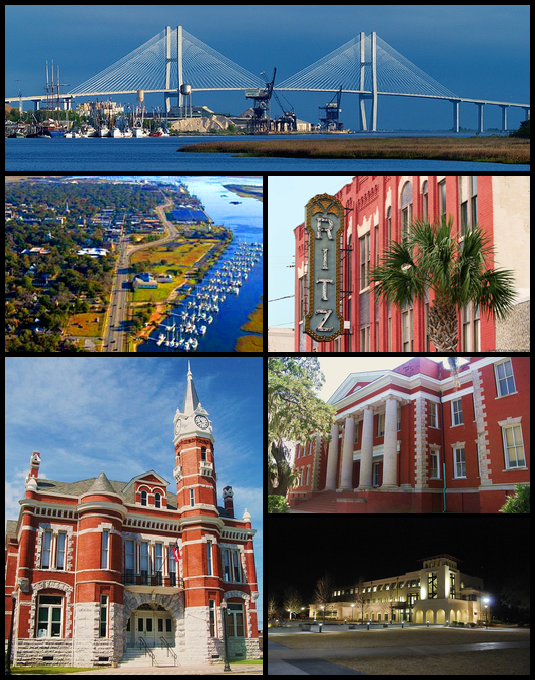
- Clockwise: the Port of Brunswick, Ritz Theatre, Glynn Academy Prep Building, Health and Science Building, Old City Hall, Aerial photograph of the Old Town National Historic District
- Interactive map of Golden Isles
- Location within Georgia
- Coordinates: 31.158889°N 81.489167°W
- Country: United States
- State: Georgia
- County: Glynn
- Elevation: 0 ft (0 m)
- Time zone: UTC−5 (EST)
  - Summer (DST): UTC−4 (EDT)
- ZIP codes: 31520-31525, 31527, 31561
- Area code: 912
- Website: www.goldenisles.com

The Golden Isles of Georgia consist of several barrier islands, along with the mainland port cities of Brunswick and Darien, on the 100-mile-long Atlantic Ocean coast of the U.S. state of Georgia. They include St. Simons Island, Sea Island, Jekyll Island, Little St. Simons Island, Sapelo Island, and Blackbeard Island. The islands are part of a chain of barrier islands known as the "Sea Islands", located along the coasts of South Carolina, Georgia and northern Florida. The area's natural beaches, vast stretches of marshland, maritime forests, historical sites, and abundant wildlife attract nature, fishing, and water sports enthusiasts, tourists, golfers, and history buffs.

All the islands are located within McIntosh County and Glynn County, and make up the lower middle section of Georgia's eleven barrier islands. Annual temperatures average 68 °F, with July highs of 90 °F. St. Simons is the largest, with a population of 14,982 residents as of the 2020 census. Curled around its north end and accessible only by boat is Little St. Simons Island—privately owned and maintained in its natural state with a small capacity guest lodge and cottages. Jekyll Island is owned by the state of Georgia and operated as a state park, with limited residential areas. Sea Island is owned by Sea Island Acquisitions LLC, which operates the Cloister resort and other properties on the island.

The city of Brunswick traces its history back to early colonial times, and the founding of the Georgia colony by General James Oglethorpe. From its earliest days, the port of Brunswick was important to the growth and economy of the United States. In 1789, George Washington named Brunswick one of the five original ports of entry for the thirteen colonies. During World War II, Brunswick hosted an important construction site for Liberty ships, and Naval Air Station Glynco, a major operational base for blimps.

The city of Darien traces its history back to the construction of Ft. King George in 1722; chartered in 1736, it is the second oldest city in Georgia. James Oglethorpe laid out the city plan for Darien, noted for its squares and grid pattern layout much like those of Savannah, which he also planned. Fort Federica on St. Simons Island was later constructed to protect the city of Darien and its important commerce.

Tourism is the most important economic sector in the Golden Isles, with an estimated 2.4 million visitors in 2014. Other key components of the local economy include the Port of Brunswick, the Federal Law Enforcement Training Center, aviation support services, and manufacturing. Travelers to the area arrive primarily via Brunswick Golden Isles Airport and Interstate 95. McKinnon St. Simons Island Airport serves general aviation.

== Communities ==
=== St. Simons Island ===
St. Simons Island is the largest of the Golden Isles, with a permanent population of 14,982 as of the 2020 census. Reachable via the F. J. Torras Causeway, the island is a tourist destination for its beaches, water sports, boating and fishing, golf, nature trails, historical landmarks, shopping, restaurants and nightlife.

The St. Simons Lighthouse, located on the south end of the Island, has been in operation since 1872 (an earlier lighthouse, completed in 1810, was destroyed during the Civil War). The Lighthouse and Museum are open to the public daily. Adjacent to the lighthouse is Neptune Park which has a public pool and playground. The nearby pier is a draw for anglers, tourists, and sightseers. The Pier Village on Mallery Street is lined with boutiques and a variety of restaurants.

Not far from the village, beaches include Massengale Park and the Coast Guard Station beach, which also features the Maritime Center Museum. Near the Coast Guard beach is the Bloody Marsh battle site where in 1742, a small garrison of British troops defeated a much larger Spanish force and in the process, put an end to Spain's influence north of Florida.

Farther to the north are the ruins of Fort Frederica, established by Gen. James Oglethorpe in 1736 as protection for the Georgia colony, and Cannon's Point, a 600-acre nature preserve that includes maritime forest, marshland, hiking trails and plantation ruins.

Housing on St. Simons Island consists primarily of single-family homes and condominiums, many of which are rented during peak visitation periods. Outdoor activities are common year-round, including hiking, bicycling, canoe and kayaking, paddle-boarding, offshore and inshore fishing and beachcombing.

=== Sea Island ===
Sea Island is a privately owned resort and residential community, located to the east of St. Simons Island and reachable by causeway. The upscale resort operates properties on Sea Island: The Cloister, Beach Club, Cottages; and on St. Simons Island: The Lodge, and The Inn at Sea Island. With the exception of special events, access is restricted to guests of any Sea Island property, island home owners and their guests, and Sea Island Club members. The resort also includes three championship golf courses—the Sea Island Golf Club hosts the annual PGA tour event, the RSM Classic (formerly The McGladrey Classic). In June 2004, the 30th G8 Summit was hosted by President George W. Bush on Sea Island.

=== Little St. Simons Island ===
Little St. Simons Island lies to the north and east of St. Simons Island and is accessible only by boat. Privately owned, it is the only island in the group virtually untouched by development. Its 10,000 acres (4,000 ha) include maritime forests, marshland, and seven miles of natural beach.

The Lodge on Little St. Simons, a rustic retreat originally built as a hunting lodge, offers the only available accommodations, with a limit of 32 guests per night. A staff of naturalists conduct guided tours along the beach and inland. Available activities include birding, kayaking, bicycling, hiking, fishing and nature photography. Guests depart on a private boat from the Hampton River Marina on St. Simons Island. The Lodge is one of only two properties in the U.S. to be awarded a Benchmarked Certificate by Green Globe 21, a global certification organization dedicated to sustainable tourism. Little St. Simons Island has been declared an "Important Bird Area" by the Audubon Society.

=== Jekyll Island ===
Jekyll Island is wholly owned by the state of Georgia and managed by the Jekyll Island Authority. Located south of St. Simons Island, it is reachable via the Downing Musgrove Causeway (GA 520) off US 17 in Glynn County. The island includes 10 miles of beach, four golf courses, a Nature Center, boat tours, the Jekyll Island Convention Center, and a variety of lodging options. The Jekyll Island Museum operates tours of the Historic Landmark District which includes homes built during the late nineteenth and early twentieth centuries by wealthy Northern businessmen, including J. P. Morgan, William Vanderbilt, Joseph Pulitzer, and Marshall Field.

The Georgia Sea Turtle Center on Jekyll is a rehabilitation hospital, research center and education facility devoted to conservation and protection of sea turtles. Open to the public year-round, the center offers exhibits, viewing of turtle patients, and a variety of educational programs and field trips.

The Jekyll Island Club opened in 1888, and quickly became one of the most exclusive private social clubs in the United States. Among its members was AT&T president Theodore Vail, who participated from there in the first transcontinental telephone call on January 25, 1915. After the Panic of 1907, Senator Nelson Aldrich convened secret meetings of prominent bankers at the club, under the guise of a duck hunting trip, to formulate plans for a central banking structure, which ultimately became the basis for the Federal Reserve System.

By statute, commercial development on Jekyll Island is tightly restricted. Homeowners on the Island rent their land from the state on long-term leases.

=== Historic Brunswick ===
Brunswick's first English settler was Capt. Mark Carr, who established a plantation on the site in 1738, while serving under Gen. James Oglethorpe. Four years later, Capt. Carr participated in the Battle of Bloody Marsh on St. Simons Island. In 1771, Carr's property was acquired by the Royal Province of Georgia, and the city was laid out in the "Oglethorpe grid" pattern, similar to Savannah. Listed on the National Register of Historic Places, the Brunswick Old Town Historic District contains several landmarks and 19th century homes.

Mary Ross Park on the East River hosts a variety of events including concerts, weddings, a farmer's market, and the annual Brunswick Stewbilee. Passenger cruise ships dock at the park, as well as local shrimp boats that trawl the area's offshore shrimping grounds.

Located on the east side of the Brunswick peninsula are the "Marshes of Glynn", commemorated by Georgia poet, Sidney Lanier. Just down US 17 is the Sidney Lanier Bridge, site of an annual 5K run that draws participants from throughout the Southeast.

=== Glynn County ===
Map showing Glynn County

Glynn County, Georgia, where the Golden Isles are located is one of the state's original eight counties, established in 1777 from 423 square miles of land formerly held by Creek Indians. The county seat is Brunswick, the only incorporated entity in the county. Glynn County is named for John Glynn, a member of the British Parliament and a friend of the colonies who once held the position of Sergeant of London.

Notable features include the Sidney Lanier Bridge which spans the entrance to the Port of Brunswick, and is one of the gateways to the Golden Isles. It is currently the longest spanning bridge in Georgia. The Federal Law Enforcement Training Center (FLETC) is headquartered in Glynn County, and provides training for several federal law enforcement agencies. The Brunswick Golden Isles Airport serves residents and tourists alike, and is home to a growing aviation services industry.

The 2020 Census reported Glynn County's population at 84,499.

== History ==
When the Spaniards arrived in the early 1500s, they encountered the Guale people and the Mocama, a Timucua group. Relations between the Native Americans and the European newcomers alternated between friendly and hostile, as their allegiance was sought by competing Old World powers. By the late 1600s the strip of land between the St. Marys and the Altamaha Rivers in coastal Georgia became known as the "Debatable Land", while the Spanish and English fought to establish dominance.

During this time, a Scottish nobleman, Sir Robert Montgomery, who envisioned a utopian colony called the Margravate of Azilia between the Savannah and Altamaha rivers, formed a syndicate of wealthy Londoners in 1717 and wrote Discourse Concerning the Design'd Establisment of a New Colony in which he praised the beauty of the region and the opportunities it presented, giving it the "well deserved Denomination of the Golden Islands". The colony was never established, but the Golden Islands name persists.

By the 1730s, the Native American population had declined, and Great Britain had prevailed to the extent of founding the colony of Georgia under the leadership of Gen. James Oglethorpe, who established the city of Savannah. (Some three decades later, the town of Brunswick would be laid out in a similar grid pattern, consisting of streets and squares.) In 1736, Oglethorpe built Fort Frederica on the western shore of St. Simons Island to defend the Georgia colony from the Spaniards to the south.

Title to the "Debatable Land" was finally established in 1742, after the Battle of Bloody Marsh on St. Simons Island. By way of tactical maneuvers and trickery, Gen. Oglethorpe and his badly outnumbered force defeated the Spaniards, who then retreated to St. Augustine, never to return. When the General's force was disbanded in 1749, Fort Frederica fell into disuse, and most of its buildings were destroyed by the "Great Fire" of 1758. The fort's remains, along with the Bloody Marsh site, are a national monument operated by the National Park Service.

Military action on the south Georgia coast during the American Revolution was very limited compared to events in the north. In April 1778 there was a brief naval skirmish off St. Simons Island in which the Americans prevailed. However, the British capture of Savannah later that year effectively ended further hostilities.

As agriculture took hold after the Revolution, the Golden Isles region became known for rice and cotton production. A fine, long-fiber cotton variety called Sea Island cotton grown on St. Simons Island was preferred in England, and consequently it was planted throughout the Georgia low country. Several plantations thrived on St. Simons, among them were Hamilton, Retreat, Hampton, and Cannon's Point. The only surviving ruins are at Cannon's Point and the tabby slave cabins at Hamilton. Both are open to the public. One former slave cabin from Retreat Plantation remains intact. It is made of tabby, with a shingle roof, a brick chimney, and shuttered windows.

Even before the Civil War, Island plantations had begun their decline due to a dramatic slackening of English demand, lack of crop rotation for soil management, and absentee ownership. Postwar, the area languished until the advent of the lumber mills in the latter third of the 19th century. During this period, a new lighthouse was constructed to replace the 1810 lighthouse that was destroyed during the Civil War. The current Lovely Lane Chapel was built, and Christ Church was rebuilt. One of the island mills supplied timbers for New York's Brooklyn Bridge.

With the turn of the 20th century and the arrival of the automobile, a new industry began to arise—vacation travel. In 1924, the F. J. Torras Causeway opened St. Simons Island to everyone. Sea Island, Little St. Simons, and Jekyll Island all remained in private hands, with the latter becoming the site of winter homes for wealthy Northern industrialists and bankers.

During World War II, blimps from Glynco Naval Air Station in Brunswick patrolled the Atlantic, protecting convoys and looking for German U-boats that frequented the area. The Brunswick harbor served as one of the nation's most important production centers for Liberty Ships.

== Geography and climate ==
The City of Brunswick and its four barrier islands are located on the south Georgia coast, about midway between Savannah and Jacksonville. The islands lie between the Altamaha River delta to the north and the Satilla River to the south. This location is the center point of the Georgia Bight, the inward curve of the east coast that stretches from Cape Fear, North Carolina to Cape Canaveral, Florida. The resulting funnel effect on incoming tides in this region creates a more extreme tidal swing than elsewhere on the U.S. coast, ranging from six to ten feet.

According to the Köppen Climate Classification System, the Golden Isles climate is humid subtropical, with hot summers and mild winters. The average low temperature in January is 42.6 °F. The average high in July is 90.4 °F. Rainfall is greatest in August and September. Accumulation of snow/ice is extremely rare.

Climate data for St. Simons Island, GA
Month	Jan	Feb	Mar	Apr	May	Jun	Jul	Aug	Sep	Oct	Nov	Dec	Year
Record high °F (°C)	83 (28)	85 (29)	90 (32)	94 (34)	100 (38)	103 (39)	104 (40)	101 (38)	97 (36)	95 (35)	89 (32)	84 (29)	104 (40)
Mean daily maximum °F (°C)	60.5 (15.8)	63.2 (17.3)	68.9 (20.5)	75.0 (23.9)	82.2 (27.9)	87.5 (30.8)	90.4 (32.4)	88.7 (31.5)	84.7 (29.3)	77.8 (25.4)	70.4 (21.3)	62.8 (17.1)	76.0 (24.4)
Daily mean °F (°C)	51.5 (10.8)	54.5 (12.5)	60.3 (15.7)	66.5 (19.2)	74.5 (23.6)	80.3 (26.8)	82.8 (28.2)	81.8 (27.7)	78.1 (25.6)	70.2 (21.2)	61.8 (16.6)	54.1 (12.3)	68.0 (20.0)
Mean daily minimum °F (°C)	42.6 (5.9)	45.8 (7.7)	51.7 (10.9)	58.1 (14.5)	66.8 (19.3)	73.1 (22.8)	75.3 (24.1)	75.0 (23.9)	71.6 (22.0)	62.5 (16.9)	53.2 (11.8)	45.4 (7.4)	60.1 (15.6)
Record low °F (°C)	6 (−14)	16 (−9)	22 (−6)	36 (2)	46 (8)	52 (11)	66 (19)	62 (17)	49 (9)	37 (3)	21 (−6)	12 (−11)	6 (−14)
Average precipitation inches (mm)	3.2 (81)	3.5 (89)	3.9 (99)	2.5 (64)	1.9 (48)	4.8 (120)	4.1 (100)	6.3 (160)	5.8 (150)	4.5 (110)	2.0 (51)	2.6 (66)	45.0 (1,140)
Average precipitation days (≥ 0.01 in)	8	9	8	6	7	11	10	13	11	7	6	7	103
Source: NOWData - NOAA Online Weather Data

In 1968 when famed Chicago TV weatherman P. J. Hoff was about to retire, he conducted an extensive analysis, based on his personal preferences, to find the best climate in the U.S. Based on several factors, he chose the Golden Isles, and moved to St. Simons Island, where he lived until his death in 1981.

== Wildlife and vegetation ==
The diverse array of wildlife and marine vegetation on the islands attracts many visitors. The area's most distinctive characteristic, its extensive marshes and estuaries, provides an abundance of food plus breeding grounds for a multitude of land, sea, and air creatures.

Most of the area between the islands and the mainland consists of marshland, dominated by smooth cordgrass (Spartina), which is the key provider of life-sustaining nutrients for the wildlife. This rich source of nutrients supports a variety of wildlife in the environment. Commonly seen along the beaches and the adjacent maritime forests are several species of shorebirds, including egrets, herons, white ibis, gulls, terns, plovers, sandpipers, pelicans, and ospreys. Local birds of prey include vultures, hawks, and the southern bald eagle. Five of the eighteen sites along Georgia's Colonial Coast Birding Trail are located within the Golden Isles/Glynn County.

Along the beaches, inshore waterways and piers are horseshoe crabs, ghost crabs, dolphins, manatees (in summer), striped mullet, jellyfish, sand dollars, stingrays, and whelk shells inhabited by hermit crabs. Sand dunes along the rear of the beach protect the inland vegetation and serve as an essential buffer during storm tides. Sea oats grow along the dunes—their complex root systems help keep the sand in place—and Georgia law prohibits picking them. Beach morning glories and their vines serve a similar purpose. During certain times of year, dead cordgrass (known as wrack) washes up on the beach and gathers at the high tide line. Insects and microorganisms in the wrack provide nutrients and the wrack itself traps sand to help nourish the dunes. Behind the dunes sits a variety of vegetation, culminating in the maritime forests that provide the tree canopy characteristic to Georgia's barrier islands. Live oaks, southern pines, cabbage palms, magnolias, and other trees form the canopy. Below is a vast complex of shrubs including palmettos, yaupon, yucca, prickly-pear cactus, resurrection fern, and many others including the iconic Spanish moss. The forest is also home to different species of amphibians and land animals, including deer, snakes, raccoons, alligators, wild turkey, frogs, and many others.

One of the area's endangered creatures is the loggerhead sea turtle. From late May through mid-August, female turtles clamber up the beach after dark to dig nests in the dunes above the high water line and lay their eggs. Turtles face many natural and man-made threats—all species of sea turtles are currently protected by the Federal Endangered Species Act. The Georgia Department of Natural Resources coordinates the efforts of several local agencies and volunteers under the Georgia Sea Turtle Cooperative. These groups monitor, protect and manage nests found on Golden Isles beaches, in addition to conducting research and public awareness and education programs. The Georgia Sea Turtle Center on Jekyll Island, a member of the cooperative, provides rehabilitation services for injured turtles as well as research and education through a variety of programs and field trips.

Another endangered species found just offshore is the North Atlantic Right Whale. These migratory sea mammals were so called by whalers because they floated when they were killed; they were easy to hunt and yielded large amounts of oil and baleen. As a result, they were hunted almost to extinction. Right whales are currently protected by both federal and state law. In autumn some of them travel from their feeding grounds in the Northeastern United States and Canada to their calving grounds off of coastal North Carolina, South Carolina, Georgia, and Florida. NOAA has designated a critical habitat area that includes the "nearshore and offshore waters of the southeastern U.S., extending from Cape Fear, North Carolina south to approximately 27 nm [nautical miles] below Cape Canaveral, Florida." Federal law prohibits vessels from approaching or remaining within 500 yards of a right whale. As of October 2026, NOAA Fisheries estimates there are only about 70 reproductively active females in existence.

== Culture ==
The Golden Isles have a broad cultural heritage. There is an active contemporary cultural scene with local theater productions, art and photography shows, music festivals, culinary events, and environmental expositions scheduled throughout the year. Venues include the historic Ritz Theatre, the Brunswick Actors Theatre, Mary Ross Park, Neptune Park, and the St. Simons Island Casino, home of the Island Players.

=== Arts and music ===
The Golden Isles are home to a number of art galleries, and other venues where artists display their works. Golden Isles Arts & Humanities in Brunswick and Glynn Visual Arts on St. Simons Island have promoted and supported both established and beginning artists.

Among the more unusual local art forms are the sculptures, "Tree Spirits of St. Simons Island", hand-carved in the wood and bark of live oak trees "on areas [...] void of living tissue". Created by a local sculptor, they memorialize Native Americans who lived on the islands as well as sailors lost at sea on ships made with timbers from island live oak trees.

Historical and modern stained glass artwork may be seen at several locations throughout the Golden Isles. At Christ Church Frederica, "The Confession of St. Peter", dates to 1899. Faith Chapel on Jekyll Island includes a window signed by Louis Tiffany. Lovely Lane Chapel at Epworth by the Sea features Old English Art Glass windows. Another Tiffany window is located at St. Mark's Episopal Church in Brunswick. Other notable examples can be seen at the King & Prince Resort, the Cloister Hotel, and the Jekyll Island Club Hotel, as well as many other churches throughout the area.

In late spring and summer, there are outdoor concerts at Mary Ross Waterfront Park in Brunswick and Neptune Park on St. Simons Island. Jekyll Island hosts annual festivals that feature both local and out-of-town performers.

=== African-American heritage ===
The Golden Isles are located near the southern end of the Gullah Geechee Cultural Heritage Corridor, a coastal area that stretches from Wilmington, North Carolina to Jacksonville, Florida, extending 30 miles inland along its length. The language, culture, traditions, and customs of the Gullah Geechee distinguish them from other African Americans. The Gullah Geechee people are descendants of enslaved persons transported from west and central Africa who were brought to work on cotton and rice plantations along the coast of North and South Carolina, Georgia, and north Florida. The Gullah language is a creole tongue that developed from English intermixed with a number of African dialects.

The primarily rice-growing coastal plantations came to be isolated from their mainland counterparts due to the prevalence of tropical diseases such as malaria, which tended to keep the plantation owners inland. Consequently, the West African slaves were able to form tight-knit communities that retained more of their homeland culture and languages. This Gullah Geechee way of life continued more or less intact until the advent of 20th-century coastal development. The Heritage Corridor is one result of efforts to protect and preserve this unique culture.

The St. Simons African American Heritage Coalition works to preserve and educate people about Gullah Geechee culture through the annual Sea Island Festival each June on St. Simons Island. Performers at the Festival have included the Georgia Sea Island Singers, a folk group that specializes in Gullah music and dance. The Coalition also conducts tours of Gullah Geechee sites on the island. Recently they played a leading role in fundraising for restoration of the historic Harrington School House, which dates to the 1920s and served the island's African-American communities.

=== Ghost stories ===
Some of the ghost stories heard from locals and tour guides alike include:

- Mary the Wanderer, who lost her lover in a storm at sea, is supposedly seen with a lantern or riding a white horse, continuing her search.
- The flickering light in Christ Church cemetery...a candle, said to have been put there by the husband of a deceased woman who always kept a lighted candle by her bedside to allay her fear of the dark
- The ghost of Frederick Osborne at the St. Simons Lighthouse...a former lighthouse keeper killed in a duel
- The Jekyll Island Club Hotel is said to be frequented by several long deceased guests.

=== Annual festivals and events ===
Southeast Georgia Health System Bridge Run

February – Brunswick. A challenging 5K race over the Sidney Lanier Bridge, and allied events. Scheduled on Saturday of Presidents Day weekend.

Blessing of the Fleet

May – Brunswick. A two-day celebration of the Golden Isles shrimp fishing industry in Brunswick, scheduled on Mother's Day weekend.

Turtle Crawl Triathlon & Nest Fest

May – Jekyll Island. A USA Triathlon-sanctioned event that includes an International Distance Triathlon, a Sprint Distance Triathlon, and a traditional 5K Run.

Georgia Sea Island Festival

June – St. Simons Island. A celebration of the African-American Gullah Geechee culture, musical traditions, crafts and food, featuring the Georgia Sea Island Singers.

Southern Grown Festival

June – St. Simons Island. All about food and music of the South: chef demonstrations, fish fry, classes & lectures, dinner and a concert, local Southern food market, and Sunday brunch.

Shrimp & Grits: The Wild Georgia Shrimp Festival

September – Jekyll Island. Shrimp boat tours, vendors, live music, kids' fun zone, chefs' demonstrations, plus a variety of shrimp and grits dishes.

Brunswick Rockin' Stewbilee

October – Brunswick. A Brunswick Stew cooking contest coupled with a 5K run, live entertainment, kids fun zone, antique car show plus arts and crafts.

CoastFest

October – Brunswick. Interactive exhibits and displays offer the latest information about coastal weather, native plants, recycling, sea turtles, water conservation, archeology, herpetology, and geology.

Golden Isles SUP Classic

October – St. Simons Island. Stand-up paddleboarding races with prizes and trophies for the winners.

Saint Simons Food & Spirits Festival

October – St. Simons Island. Food and spirits of the Golden Isles. Food tastings at the Pier Village, several concurrent events at area restaurants, artisan market, cooking classes and demonstrations, children's activities, Sunday brunch.

The RSM Classic (formerly McGladrey Classic)

November – Sea Island. An official PGA Tour event, hosted by Davis Love, III, at the Sea Island Golf Club.

Jekyll Tree Lighting Festival & Holidays in History

November and December – Jekyll Island. Beginning with a Tree Lighting Festival on the Saturday after Thanksgiving, the event features lights and Christmas decorations in the Historic District, themed tours, storytelling, caroling and crafts.

== Outdoor sports and activities ==
With the Golden Isles' moderate climate, a variety of outdoor activities are popular year-round. Golf in the area dates back to the early 1900s, when courses were built on Jekyll Island for the wealthy industrialists who owned vacation homes there. Today there are sixteen public and private courses in Glynn County, including the historic Great Dunes Course on Jekyll Island that was designed by Walter Travis and opened in 1928, and Sea Island, host of the annual PGA tour event, The RSM Classic (formerly McGladrey Classic).

The nutrient-rich waters of the Golden Isles marshes, tidal creeks, rivers, sounds and the Atlantic Ocean are home to an extensive variety of sea life. Inshore and river fishing can yield trout, redfish, flounder, sheepshead, whiting and more. Offshore anglers can land king mackerel, Spanish mackerel, cobia, grouper, snapper, amberjack, tarpon, and several shark species. Surf casting is also popular on the islands, as is fishing from the many piers and bridges throughout the area. Fishing licenses are required for anyone over 16 years of age. Size and catch limits are also enforced.

The area's natural scenery and nature preserves attract photographers, birders and kayakers. Popular water sports include sailing, offshore scuba diving, and stand-up paddleboarding (SUP). Onshore activities include biking, hiking, tennis, and horseback riding. There is a disc golf course on St. Simons Island, as well as parks and playgrounds. In addition to swimming and sunbathing, Golden Isles beaches are visited throughout the year for walking, bird-watching, and shell-hunting.

== Tourism ==
Because it was one of the few barrier islands not privately owned, St. Simons Island was the first of the Golden Isles to develop facilities for tourism, primarily on and around the south end where visitors arrived at the pier beginning in the 1870s. Also during this time, the luxurious Oglethorpe Hotel opened in Brunswick. With the advent of the automobile and the opening of the F. J. Torras Causeway in 1924, more facilities were built (most notably by Howard Coffin, an auto magnate turned developer) and soon St. Simons Island became a vacation destination. In 1928, Coffin, who had earlier purchased Sea Island, opened the Cloister, a small inn that attracted the wealthy and famous.

While St. Simons Island was entering its tourism phase, Jekyll Island remained a private retreat for the rich and famous. After the Great Depression and World War II, however, the Jekyll Island Club and the winter "cottages" fell into disuse. In 1947, the State of Georgia purchased the island for the purpose of creating a state park. Shortly thereafter, the Jekyll Island Authority was created by the state legislature to manage the island and develop a tourism business.

== Economy ==
Within the Golden Isles, tourism is the key driver of economic activity, with an estimated impact of 1.1billion(~1.47 billion in 2025) in 2014. The resort operator, Sea Island Company is the area's largest employer. Of less economic significance, but still important to the area's appeal, is the shrimping industry. Once known as the "shrimp capital of the world", local shrimpers continue to supply fresh catch to restaurants and retailers throughout the Golden Isles and beyond.

The Port of Brunswick is the centerpiece of the area's thriving logistics industry, while Brunswick Airport is home to a growing aerospace presence. Healthcare and manufacturing are the other primary economic drivers, along with the Federal Law Enforcement Training Center.

=== Chamber of Commerce ===
The Brunswick-Golden Isles Chamber of Commerce is a private, non-profit, membership-driven organization of business enterprises, professional firms, educational institutions and individualsin Brunswick and the Golden Isles.

The Chamber does not operate as a department of the city, county or state, as it is a membership organization. Membership investments and expenses are tax deductible as a business expense rather than a charitable contribution, and businesses of every size and are part of the Chamber. It is more than 1,300 businesses, 80 percent of which are small businesses with 10 employees.

== Historical landmarks and attractions ==
=== Brunswick ===
==== Old Glynn County Courthouse ====
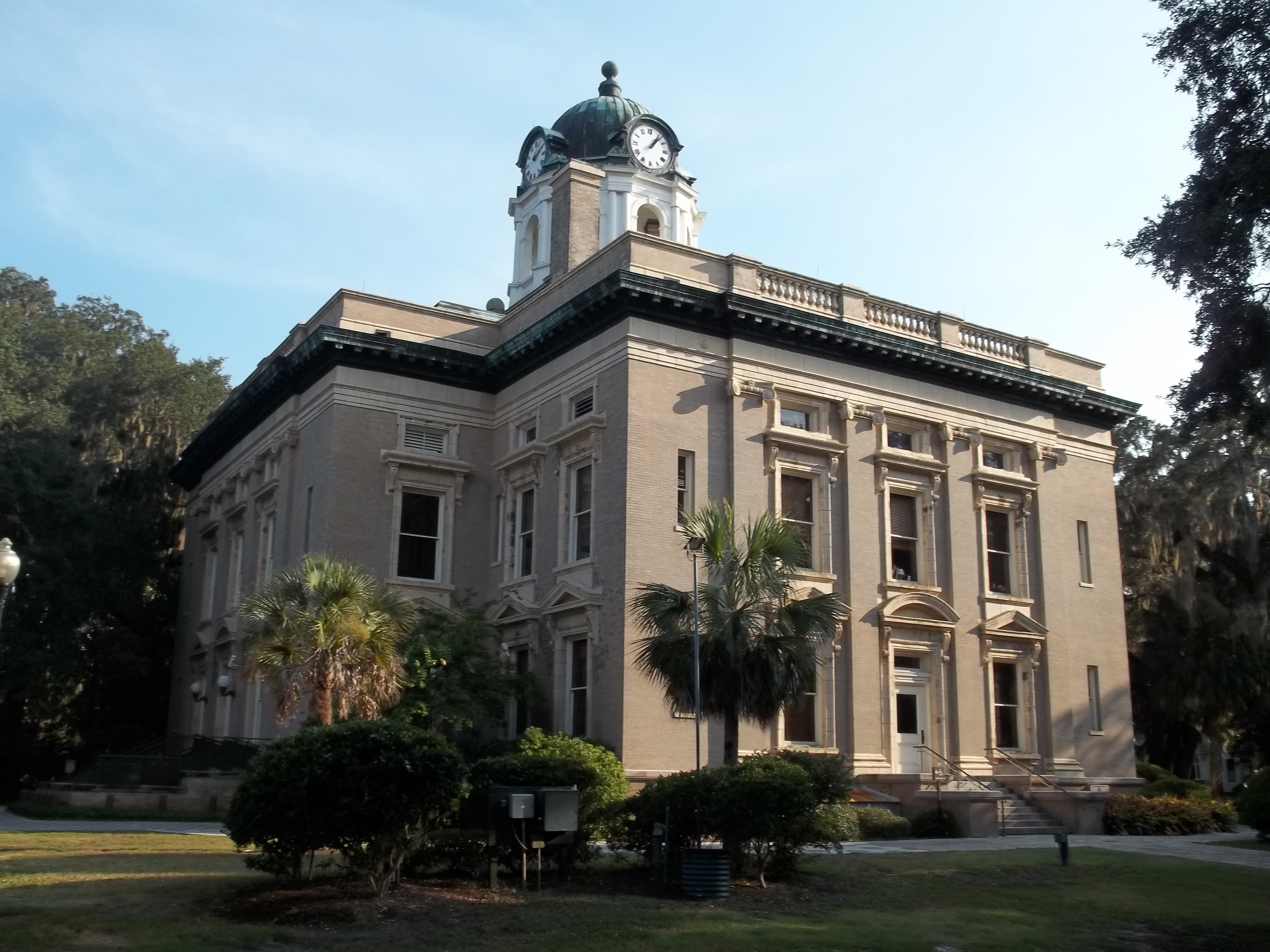
Old Glynn County Courthouse

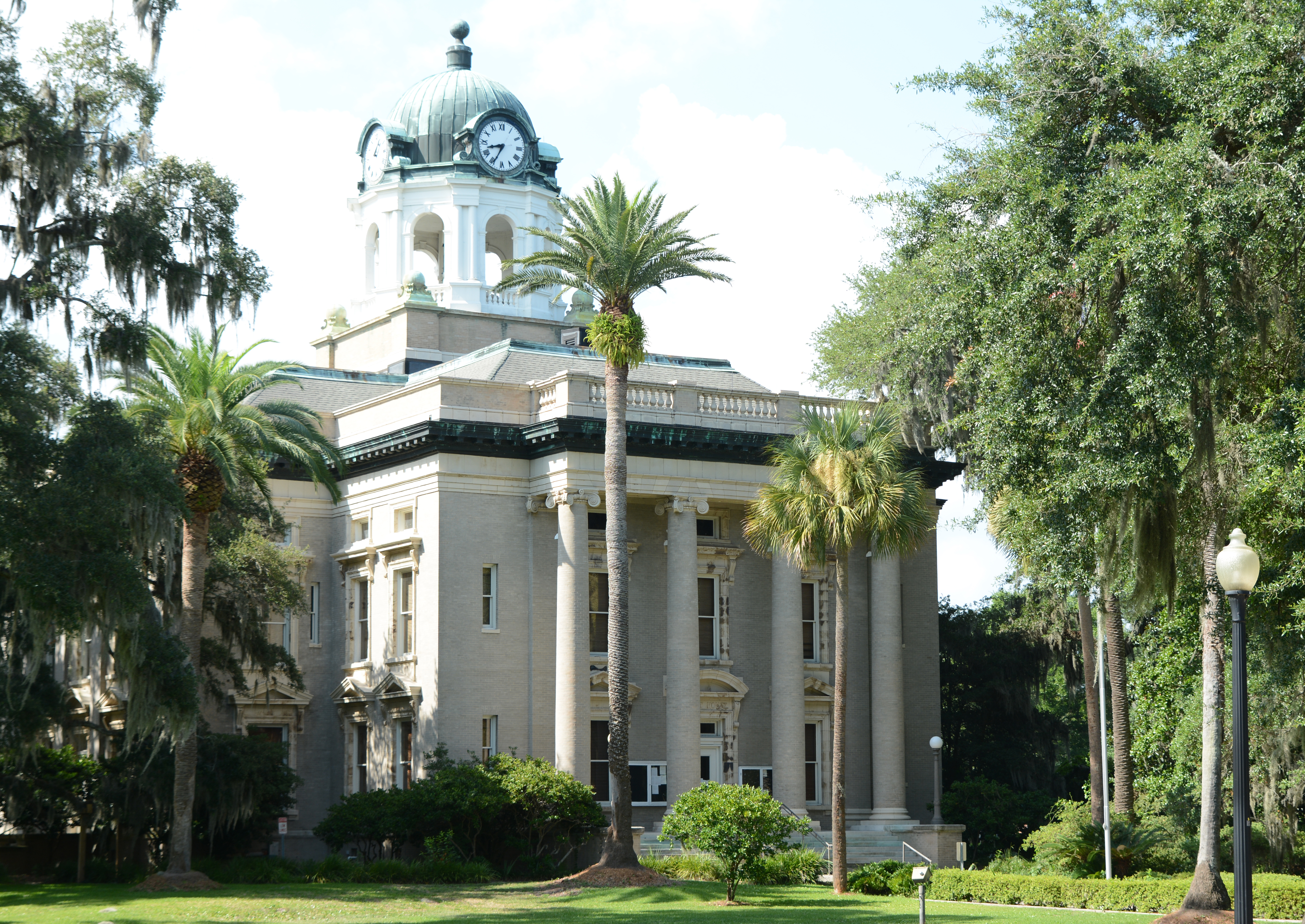
Front of historic courthouse

The Old Glynn County Courthouse is situated in a grove of live oaks within Magnolia Square—one of the historic parks and squares used to house livestock as a community pasture. The parcel was purchased in 1905 from the city for $1.00. Today it is still surrounded by moss-hung live oaks in addition to trees of foreign origin including Tung and Chinese pistachio.

The courthouse was designed by New Jersey architect Charles Alling Gifford of the New York firm Gifford & Bates. Gifford's work is notable within the National Historic Landmark District on Jekyll Island, principally Sans Souci Apartments (1896), Mistletoe Cottage (1900), and Jekyll Island Clubhouse Annex (1901). The cornerstone was laid on December 27, 1906, and construction was completed on December 18, 1907, at a total cost of $97,613. Restoration work began in the early 1990s.

It is noted as an example of Neoclassical Revival style or Beaux Arts (fine arts) architecture that flourished between 1885 and 1920. Beaux Arts combines ancient Greek and Roman forms with Renaissance ideas and is an eclectic Neoclassical style. Design suggests interlinking philosophy of justice: four identical entrances complement interior columns leading to justice; an intricate iron stair rail suggests delicate balance and the frailties of man.

The new Glynn County Courthouse is located immediately north of the structure. Opposite the Courthouse at 1709 Reynolds Street, the Mahoney-McGarvey House is known as one of the finest examples of Carpenter Gothic architecture in Georgia.

==== Historic Ritz Theatre ====
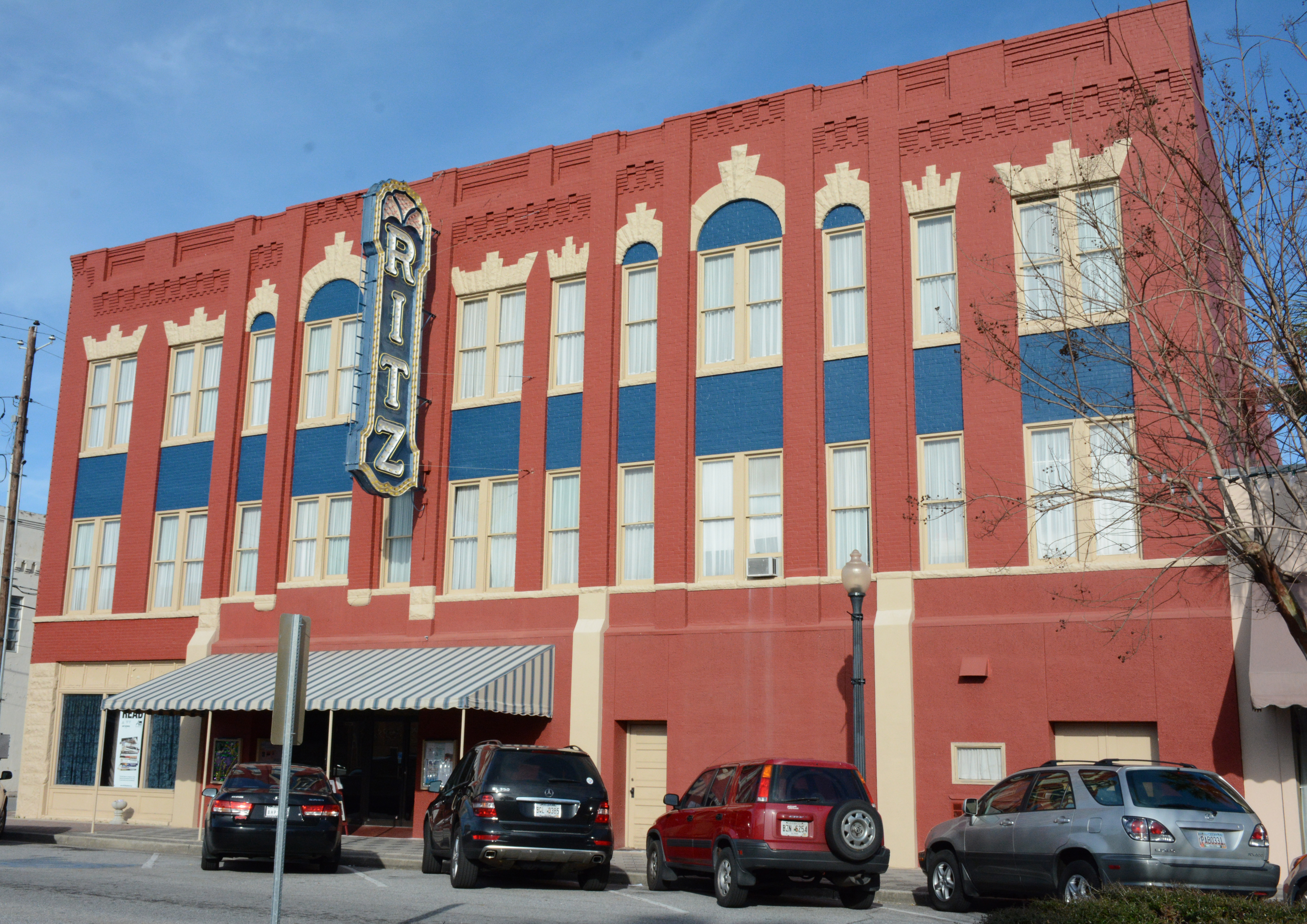
The Ritz Theatre

Originally, the Grand Opera House, a three-story Victorian building featuring ornate brick and stone work, was built for the legitimate stage. Later, it served as a theatre for vaudeville. In the 1920s, as motion pictures became the rage, the Opera House was converted into a movie palace. To give the building a more modern art deco look, the first-story brickwork was covered with carrara glass and an elaborate marquee and cascading sign were added. Thus, the Grand Opera House became the Ritz Theatre. In 1956, the world premiere of "A View From Pompey's Head," filmed primarily at the Oglethorpe Hotel (the grand hotel that used to sit across from the Ritz), was introduced by the film's star, Richard Egan, at the Ritz Theatre.

The Ritz Theatre (and single movie houses in general) fell into decline in the 60's and 70's. In 1981, the City of Brunswick purchased the Ritz, and again, the theatre was modernized and substantially altered; however, the Ritz sign was left intact. The extensive reconstruction was due in part to the collapse of the roof over the auditorium. This phase was completed in 1983.

In 2008, the Ritz became part of the Fox Theatre Institute (FTI), the only comprehensive theatre preservation organization in the U.S. and the premiere resource for historic theatre restoration and revitalization in Georgia, offering mentoring programs, preservation expertise, operational counseling, and educational opportunities. In 2010 Golden Isles Arts and Humanities applied for and received a restoration assistance grant, matched by the City of Brunswick, to restore the building's 58 original windows, which were loose and in danger of falling.

Under FTI's guidance, local craftsmen James Taylor and Taylor Davis, partnering with the Association for Preservation Technology and the Jekyll Island Restoration Team, restored the windows using the original glass and much of the original wood. FTI and the city then supported the repainting of the building. In 1899, the Grand Opera House was built of unpainted brick, then painted white by the movie company in the 1920s for a more modern feel. Because it would have been damaging to remove decades of paint from the surface, the theatre was painted a brick red when the city restored it in the 1980s. Local contractors Peninsula Painting were hired to refurbish the exterior using the same basic color scheme. When the work was completed in the summer of 2010, new curtains were made for the windows by Brunswick resident Jennifer George.

The original Ritz sign was the final exterior element needing restoration. The sign had not been fully operational for years, so FTI once again stepped in to provide assistance. In May 2011, local company Fendig Signs undertook extensive restoration work, including painting, rewiring, and the crafting of new neon letters by Ray Tanner. The restored sign was returned in the fall and on November 4, 2011, during Downtown Brunswick's First Friday event, Golden Isles Arts and Humanities held a grand re-lighting celebration.

The Ritz Theatre, located within the "Old Town Brunswick" historic district was built in 1899 to house the Grand Opera House, retail establishments, and the general offices of the Brunswick & Birmingham Railroad. Downtown Brunswick's theatre and arts center features year-round live performances, films, exhibits, and educational programs.

==== Hofwyl-Broadfield Plantation ====
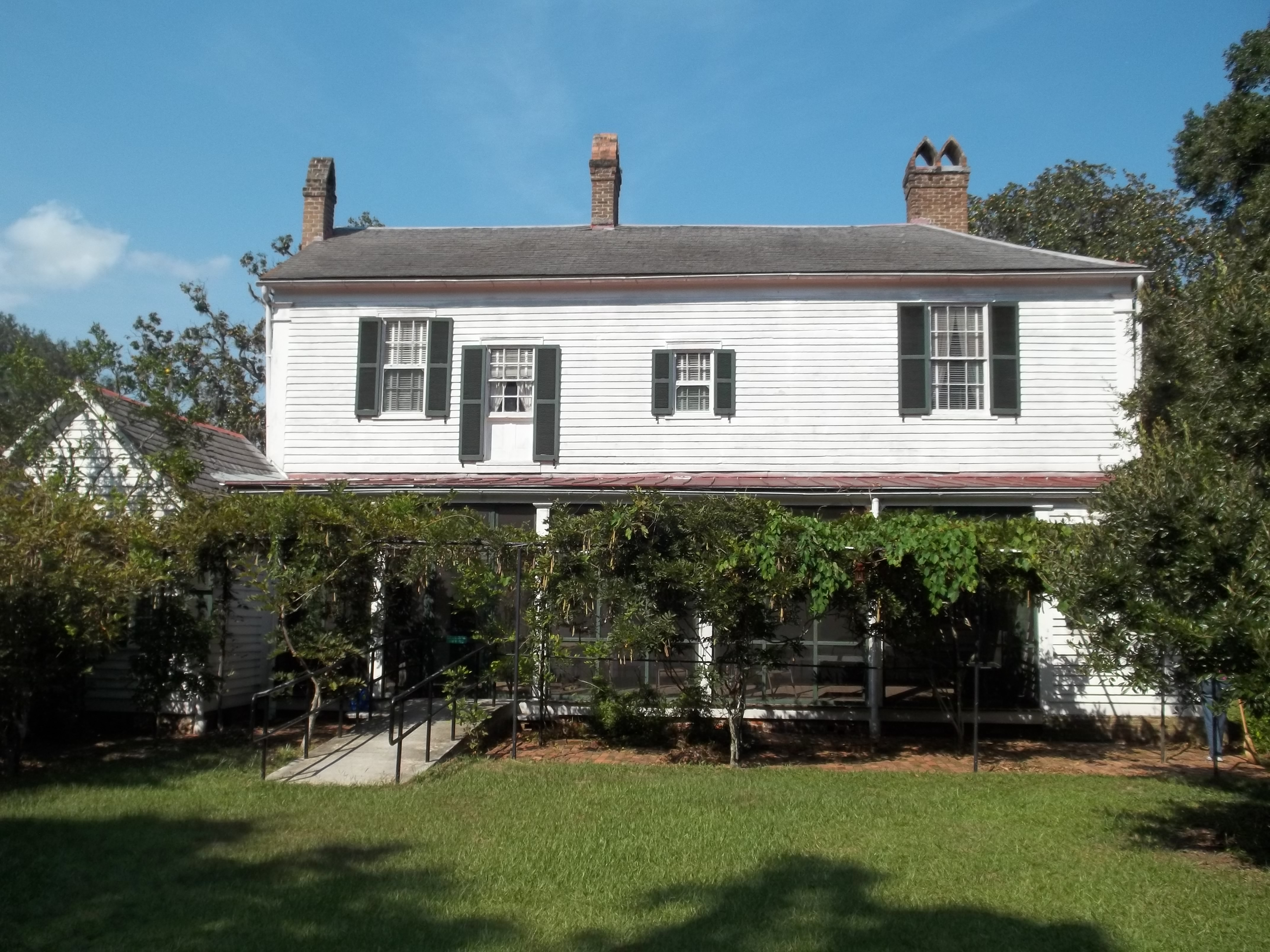
The main house of the Hofwyl-Broadfield Plantation

In the early 1800s, William Brailsford of Charleston carved a rice plantation from marshes along the Altamaha River. The plantation and its inhabitants were part of the genteel low country society that developed during the antebellum period. While many factors made rice cultivation increasingly difficult in the years after the Civil War, the family continued to grow rice until 1913.

The enterprising siblings of the fifth generation at Hofwyl-Broadfield resolved to start a dairy rather than sell their family home. The efforts of Gratz, Miriam and Ophelia Dent led to the preservation of their family legacy. Ophelia was the last heir, and in her will she left the plantation to the state of Georgia in 1973.

A museum features silver from the family collection and a model of Hofwyl-Broadfield during its heyday. A brief film on the plantation's history is shown before visitors walk a short trail to the antebellum home. A guided tour allows visitors to see the home as Ophelia kept it with family heirlooms, 18th and 19th century furniture and Cantonese china. A stop on the Colonial Coast Birding Trail, this is an excellent spot to look for herons, egrets, ibis and painted buntings. A nature trail leads back to the Visitors Center along the edge of the marsh where rice once flourished.

==== Old City Hall ====
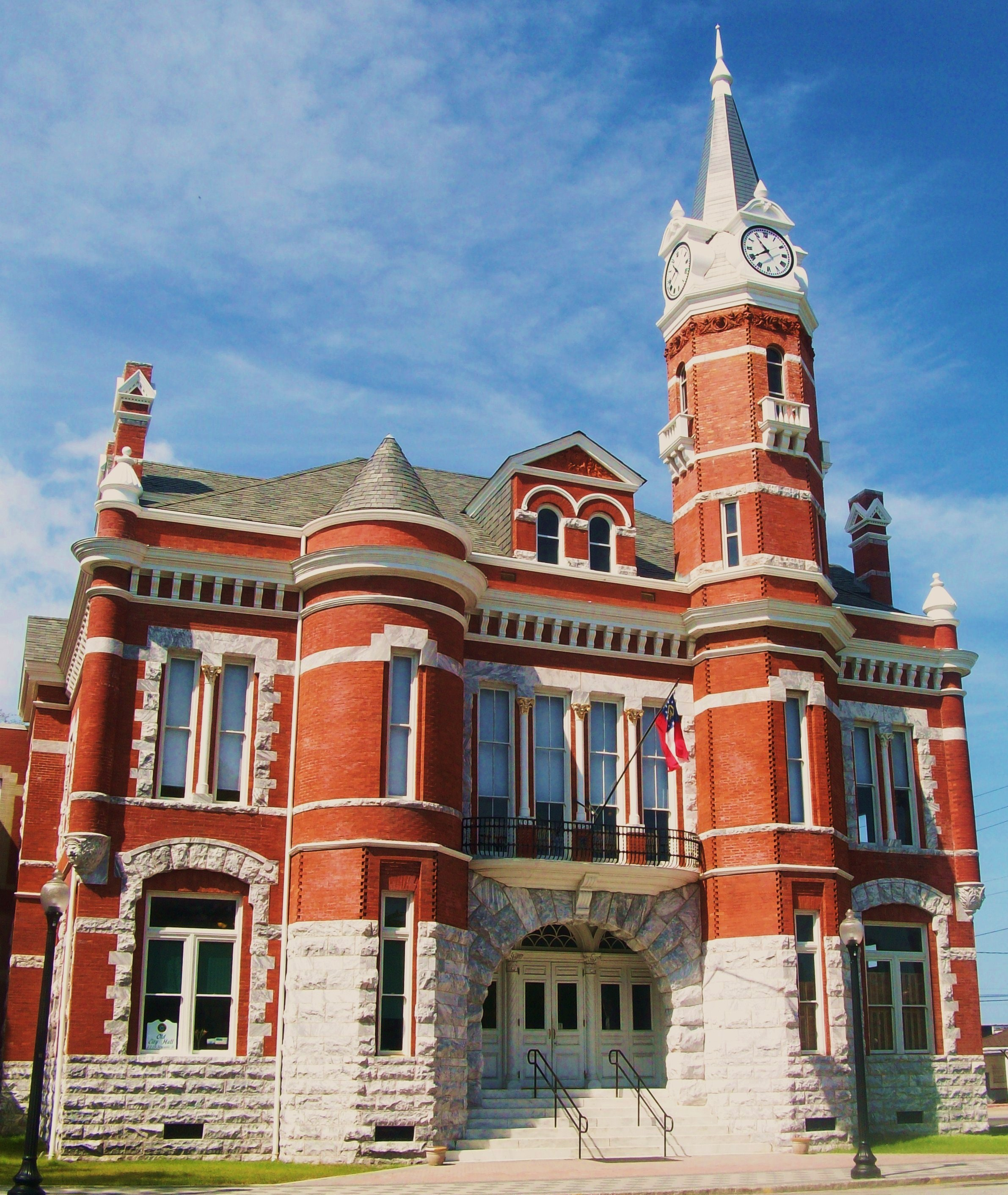
Old City Hall

This part-time city courthouse doubles as a venue for everything from class reunions to wedding receptions.

Built at a cost of 33,000,(~53,830 in 2025) Old City Hall was restored with special purpose local option sales tax dollars and reopened in 2004. It has heart-pine and marble floors, original fireplaces and refitted gaslight fixtures.

Construction on Old Brunswick City Hall began in 1886 from an architectural design by Alfred Eichberg, and was completed in 1889, with the installation of the clock/bell tower in 1893. The architectural style is Richardsonian Romanesque, with Queen Anne parallels. Many public buildings built in the United States during this period were designed in the omanesque Revival style. Elaborate terracotta friezes decorate the Old City Hall clock tower and side entries, while the corner columns are adorned with gargoyles.

=== St. Simons Island ===
==== A.W. Jones Heritage Center ====
April 2008 marked the opening of the 10,000-square-foot A.W. Jones Heritage Center. The center includes an entrance gallery, a museum shop and a 1,400 square foot event hall. The second floor includes the Society's administrative offices, a research library and the Society's collection of objects, artifacts and archival materials from hundreds of years of coastal Georgia history. Local artists and writers are featured in the gift shop.

==== Arthur J. Moore Methodist Museum and Library ====
The property was purchased in 1949 as a future Methodist retreat center. The museum, containing oriental porcelains and other artifacts gathered during the travels of Arthur J. Moore, the Bishop of both the North and South Georgia conferences of the Methodist church, grew rapidly. Charles Layman, a theologian, writer, and a professor in the Department of Religion at the University of Florida, offered to the museum items from his extensive Wesleyan collection. The North Georgia clergyman, David Ogletree, later gifted items from his substantial collection of Wesleyan historical artifacts. The research library, consisting of over 6,000 volumes, has also expanded greatly through the years. Each year, thousands of youth from churches across the Southeastern jurisdiction gather on weekends in the spring at Epworth by the Sea as part of their confirmation class training.

==== Avenue of the Oaks ====
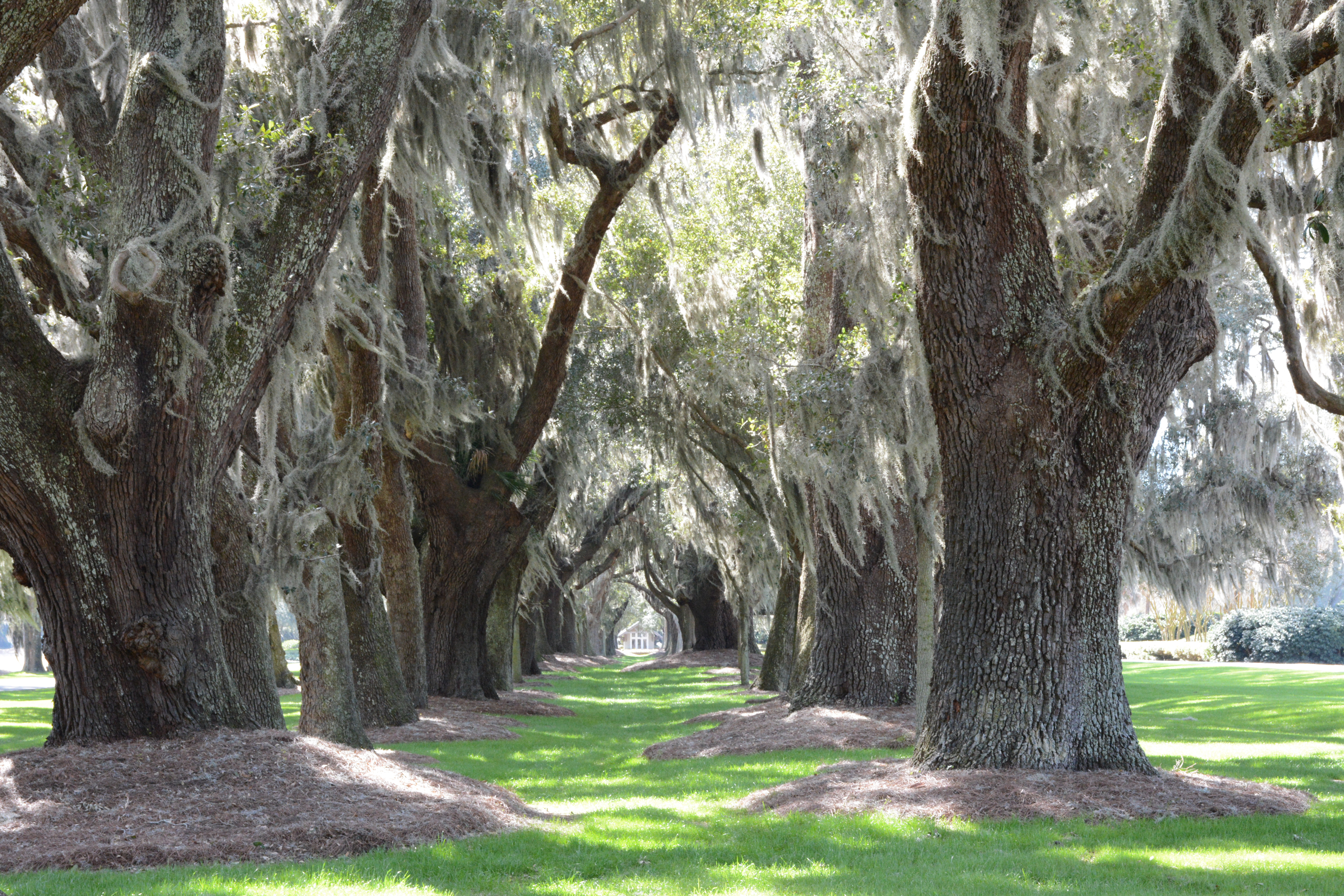
Avenue of oaks

From 1760 until the outbreak of the American Civil War, cotton and rice plantations flourished in this area. The long-fibered Sea Island cotton grown here was esteemed for its quality. Retreat Plantation, one of the most prosperous plantations, was located on the southern tip of St. Simons Island. Anna Page King, who inherited the property in 1826, planted the famous Avenue of the Oaks. King grew an abundance of flowers at Retreat Plantation and supposedly sailors nearing St. Simons Island could smell the flowers' fragrance before they saw the island shore. Once the entrance to Retreat Plantation, the Avenue of the Oaks is now the entrance to the Sea Island Golf Club. There is a drive around the double row of live oak trees, most of them planted around 1830.

==== Bloody Marsh Battle Site ====
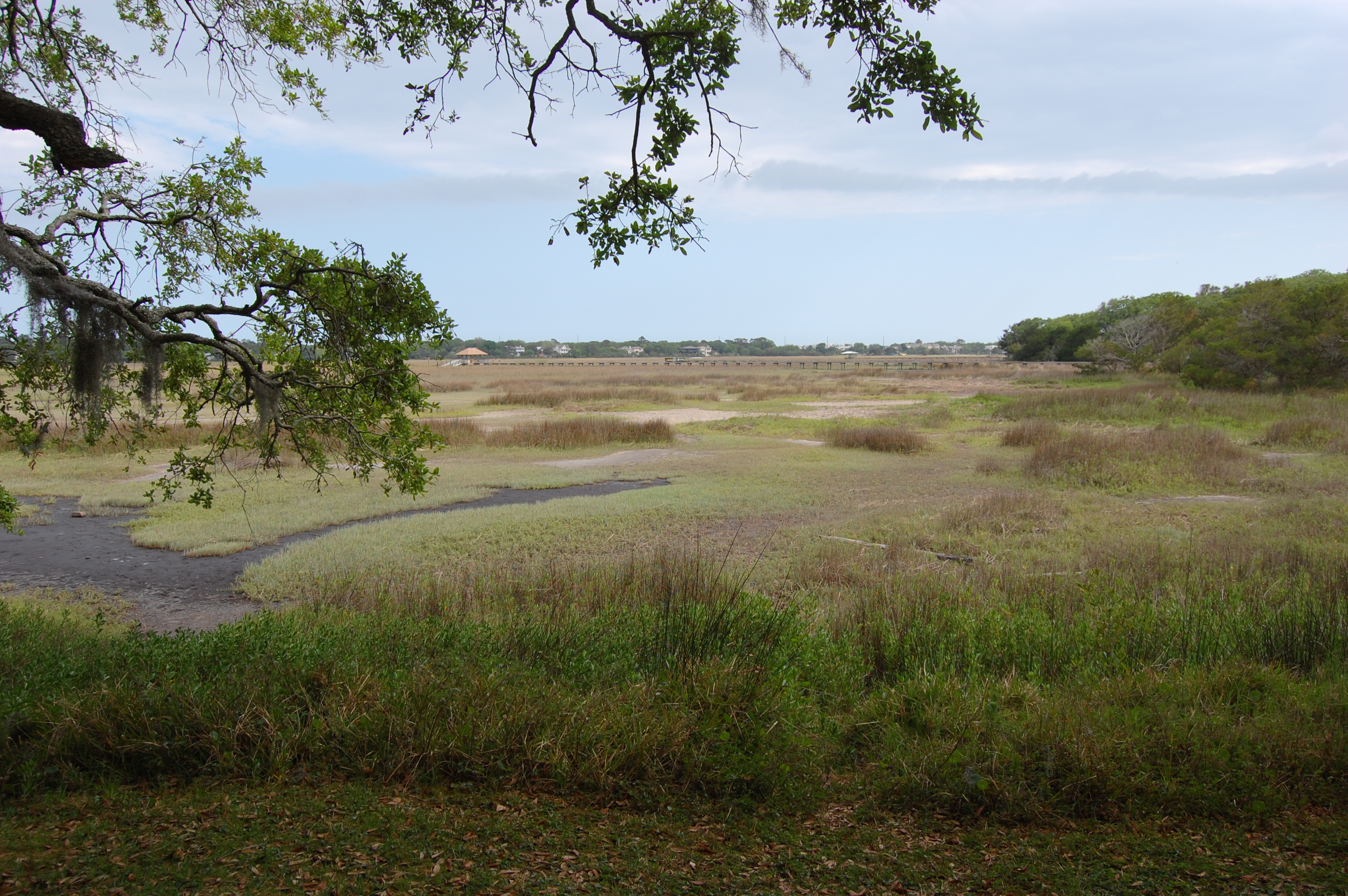
Bloody Marsh

At the Bloody Marsh Battle Site on July 7, 1742, an outnumbered force of British troops ambushed and defeated Spanish troops, halting a planned attack on Fort Frederica. Markers and information panels at this outdoor observation site explain the battle, which once and for all ended Spain's claims to the Georgia territory. This site is managed by the National Park Service as part of Fort Frederica National Monument.

==== Cannon's Point Preserve ====
A 600-acre wilderness tract on the Northeast corner of St. Simons Island, Cannon's Point is the last remaining undisturbed maritime forest on the island. Owned by the St. Simons Land Trust, the Preserve includes salt marsh, tidal creek, and river shoreline, as well as 4,000-year-old shell middens and ruins of a 17th-century plantation home and slave quarters. The Nature Conservancy holds a conservation easement on the property to ensure its preservation. The Preserve is open to the public during specified days and hours.

==== Cassina Garden Club Slave Cabins ====
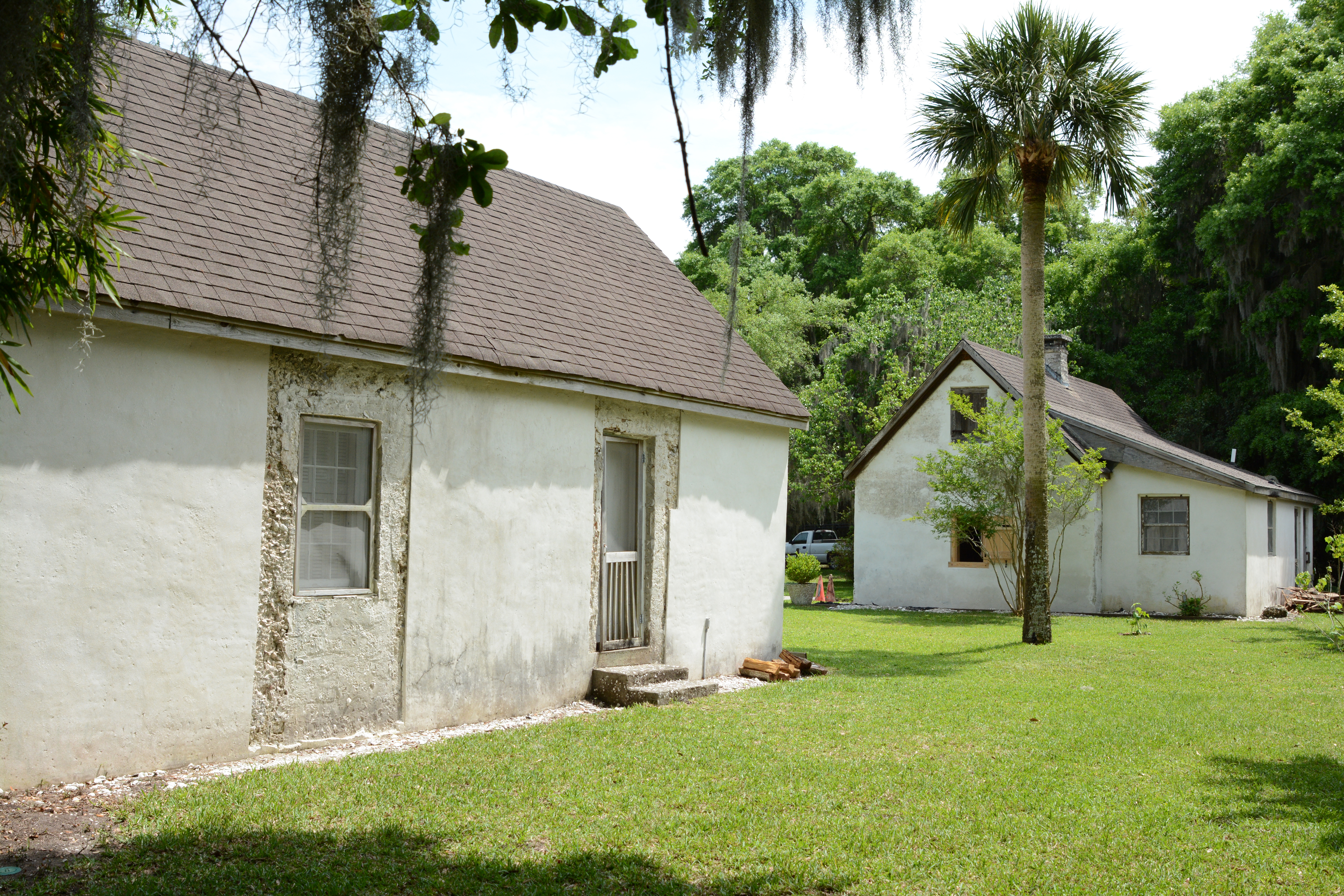
Hamilton Plantation slave houses (river view side)

Hamilton Plantation, owned by James Hamilton, a native of Scotland, was located on Gascoigne Bluff near Fort Frederica. The Bluff, named for Capt. James Gascoigne, commander of the British sloop Hawk, became a storehouse for marine supplies with ship repair facilities, making it, in effect, Georgia's first naval base. Hamilton Plantation was a working plantation, producing long staple Sea Island cotton along with oak and pine timbers.

Of the several tabby slave cabins built on the plantation, two remain today. They were constructed of tabby, which is a concrete-like mixture of lime, sand, water and oyster shells. The mixture is poured into wooden frames to harden. The cabins were divided in the center by a fireplace, thus creating two rooms that housed two families. Glass windows and wooden outside doors indicate that these cabins were probably living quarters of slaves that were high in the privilege hierarchy.

Cassina Garden Club began meeting in these cabins in 1932 and was deeded the property in 1950. As owner of this historic site, the Cassina Garden Club has restored and preserved the integrity of the cabins and displays many artifact and graphical histories.

The cabins are located adjacent to Epworth by the Sea, a Methodist Conference Center. General Oglethorpe's secretary, Charles Wesley and his Anglican clergyman brother, John, considered by many the founder of the Methodist Church, trod these grounds. All of this property was formerly part of Hamilton Plantation. This property was placed on the National Register of Historic Places by the United States Department of Interior in 1988.

==== Christ Church, Frederica ====
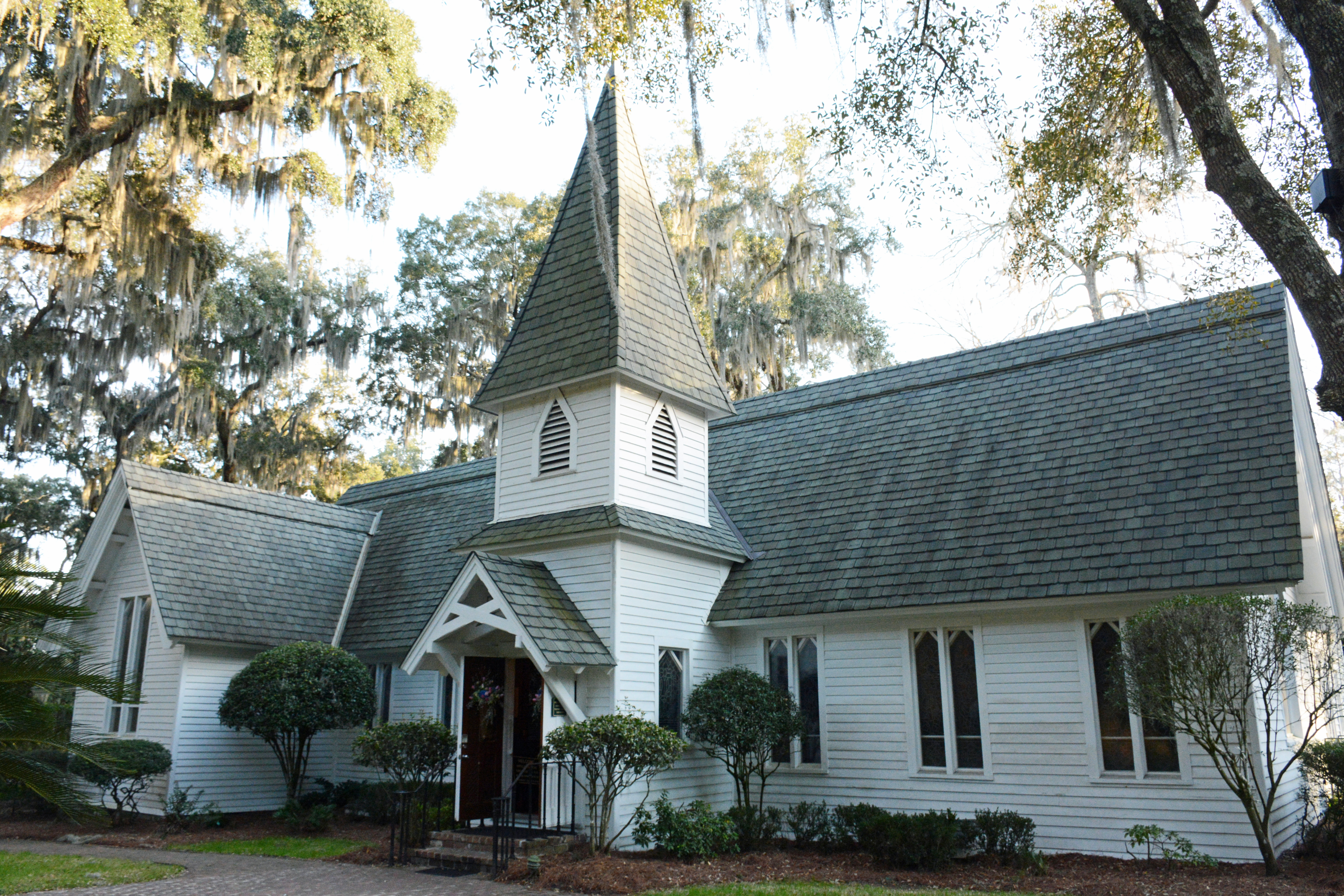
Christ Episcopal Church, established in 1736

Christ Church, Frederica is located in a setting of native live oaks, holly and cedar trees. On the site of Christ Church, nestled among large live oak trees on the scenic north end of St. Simons Island, John and Charles Wesley, who are credited with founding the Methodist Church in England, preached here before returning home.

The first church structure was built in 1820 but was partly destroyed by Union troops during the Civil War. In 1884, the minister Anson Phelps Dodge Jr. built the present structure in memory of his wife, Ellen. Christ Church is constructed of wood in the cruciform design with a trussed Gothic roof and steeple. The grounds contain a cemetery with graves of early settlers and many well-known Georgians. One Georgia author, Eugenia Price, who wrote many novels, including a series on St. Simons, is buried here along with Lucien Knight, the first state historian of Georgia. Another Georgian, a plantation owner who owned the point on St. Simons Island where the lighthouse was built, is buried at Christ Church cemetery. The cemetery's oldest tombstone is dated 1803. The church with its stained glass windows is home to the Episcopal congregation of St. Simons.

==== Epworth By The Sea ====
Epworth by the Sea, a conference and retreat center St. Simons Island owned by the South Georgia Conference of the United Methodist Church, was built over 200 years after John and Charles Wesley served and ministered on the island. The 100-acre campus is located on Gascoigne Bluff, a one-mile riverbank tract stretching from the causeway bridge to the bend in the Frederica River. The Methodists purchased part of the Hamilton Plantation in 1949 and named it Epworth in honor of the Wesley's boyhood home in Epworth, England. Lane Chapel, the oldest standing church building on St. Simons, hosts Sunday services. Constructed in 1880, it is named after the site of the 1784 founding conference of American Methodism in Baltimore, Maryland.

==== Fort Frederica National Monument ====
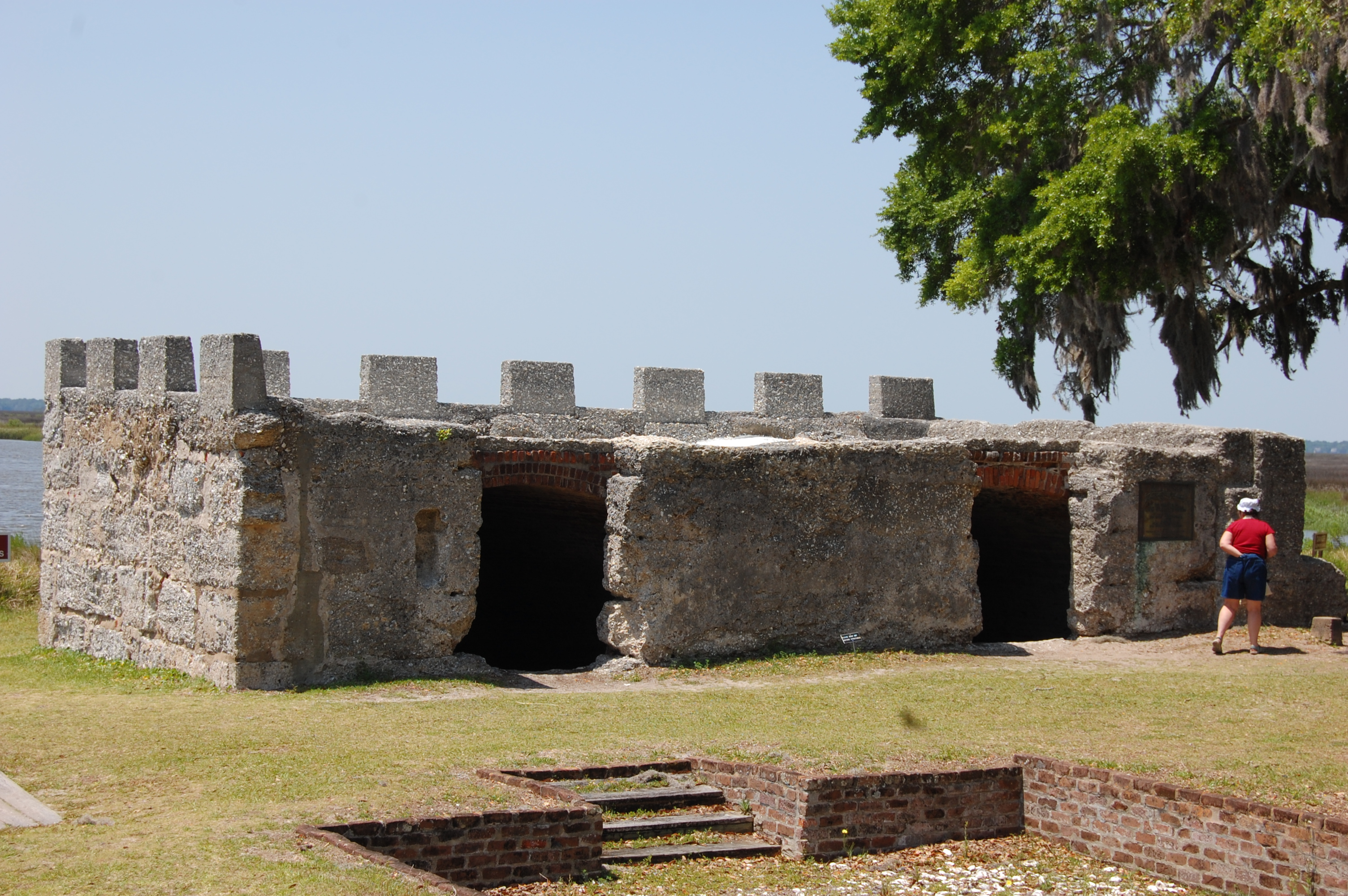
Remains of Fort Frederica

In the early 1700s, Georgia was the center of a centuries-old conflict between Spain and Britain. In 1736, three years after the founding of Savannah, James Oglethorpe established Fort Frederica to protect his southern boundary. Forty-four men and seventy-two women and children arrived to build the fort and town, and by the 1740s Frederica was a thriving village of about 500 citizens. Colonists from England, Scotland, and the Germanic states came to Frederica to support the endeavor. Georgia's fate was decided in 1742 when Spanish and British forces clashed on St. Simons Island. Fort Frederica's troops defeated the Spanish in the Battle of Bloody Marsh, ensuring Georgia's future as a British colony. However, the declining military threat to the Georgia coast saw the Fort's regiment disbanded in 1749. Today, the archeological remnants of Frederica are protected by the National Park Service.

==== Gascoigne Bluff ====
Historically, Gascoigne Bluff was the first possible landing area for a ship entering the harbor. The site of an Indian settlement long before the Wesleys landed here with James Oglethorpe, Gascoigne Bluff has been headquarters for a military invasion, a Sea Island cotton plantation, the site of a lumber mill and a shipping point for timber. Live oak timbers milled here in 1794 were used in building "Old Ironsides", the U.S.S. Constitution. In 1874, timbers were cut here for the construction of the Brooklyn Bridge.

At Gascoigne Bluff are located tabby slave cabins, a Southern Red Cedar tree that is the second largest of its kind in Georgia, a fishing pier, and a stand of live oak trees. Across the Frederica River, are three "ballast hammocks", small islands formed from ballast dumped by European ships before taking on cargoes of cotton or lumber.

==== Lovely Lane Chapel ====
The oldest standing church building on St. Simons Island is Lovely Lane Chapel. Formally named St. James Union Chapel, it was built by Norman W. Dodge in 1880. Repaired following a hurricane in 1897, the chapel was deconsecrated in 1911 to be used as a recreation center, and was reconsecrated in 1949 after the Methodists purchased the property. Lovely Lane is named after the site of the 1784 Founding Conference of American Methodism in Baltimore, Maryland. The chapel is currently open to the public for Sunday Worship Service as well as wedding ceremonies.

==== Maritime Center ====
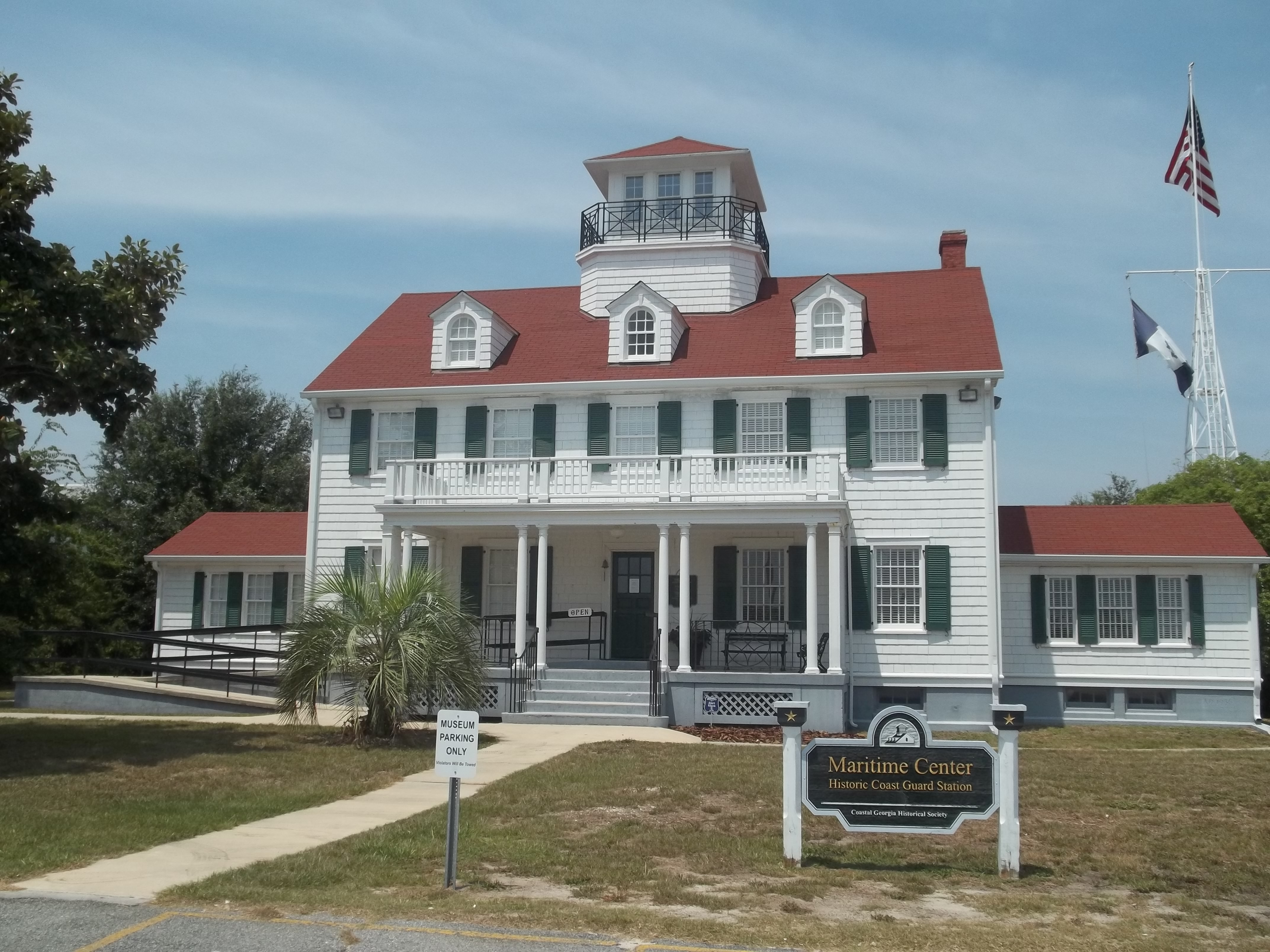
The historic Coast Guard Station now houses the Maritime Center.

The Maritime Center makes its home in the historic Coast Guard Station. It has interactive exhibits and galleries featuring coastal Georgia's natural assets, maritime and military history.

The U.S. Coast Guard Station at East Beach on St. Simons Island was one of 45 U.S. Coast Guard Stations built around the country by the Works Progress Administration (WPA). Work on the East Beach Station began in Fall 1935. It is believed to be one of only three surviving stations from that era.

The station and boathouse had its "first watch" on April 1, 1937. When the station first opened, the original beachfront was just a few feet from the front door. Today the station is separated from the beach by a large parking lot.

On April 8, 1942, German submarine U-123 sank two merchant ships, the SS Oklahoma and Esso Baton Rouge, off the coast of St. Simons Island. Joined by local residents, the coast guardsmen mounted the rescue of their crews.

In 1995, the East Beach Station was decommissioned and all local Coast Guard operations were moved to mainland Brunswick. A brand new Coast Guard Station was completed in 2005, just to the east of the Sidney Lanier Bridge.

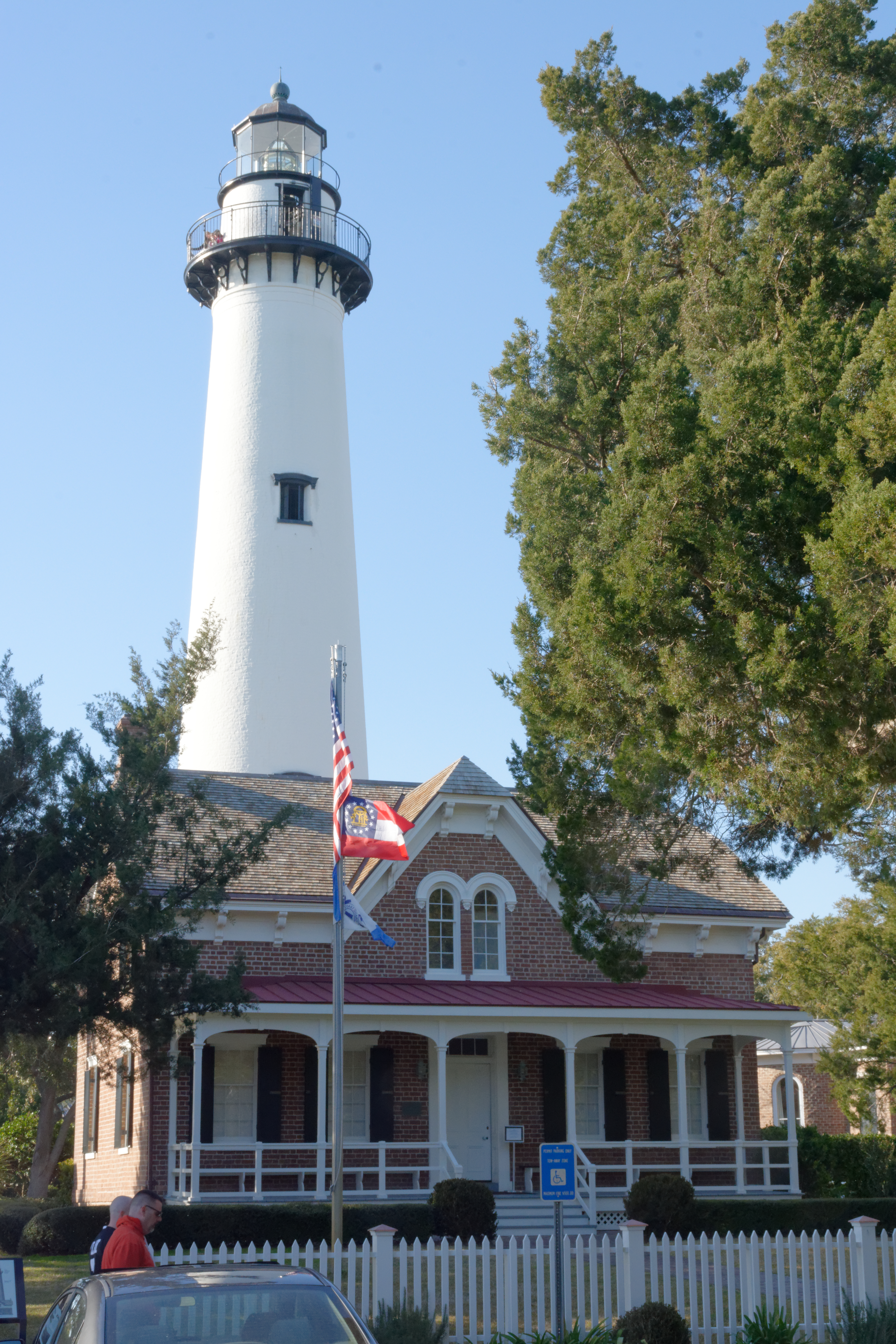
Lighthouse and keeper's house (now the museum)

==== St. Simons Island Lighthouse Museum ====
In 1965, a group of 10 citizens formed the Coastal Georgia Historical Society and gathered support from the community of Glynn County to preserve the early coastal heritage. When the 1872 lighthouse keeper's dwelling was threatened with commercial development in 1975, the Society undertook its restoration. The structure was opened in 1975 as the St. Simons Island Lighthouse Museum and has been administered by the Society since that time.

In 1984, the St. Simons Lighthouse was leased by the United States Coast Guard and became part of the museum complex. Today, the St. Simons Island Lighthouse Museum is a recognized cultural history of the area. The lighthouse, which still lights the entrance to St. Simons Sound, recalls the history of Civil War navigation. In 2004, the deed to the St. Simons Island Lighthouse was transferred to the Coastal Georgia Historical Society under the National Historic Lighthouse Preservation Act of 2000. In April 2006, the Maritime Center at the Historic Coast Guard Station opened.

=== Jekyll Island ===
==== Georgia Sea Turtle Center ====
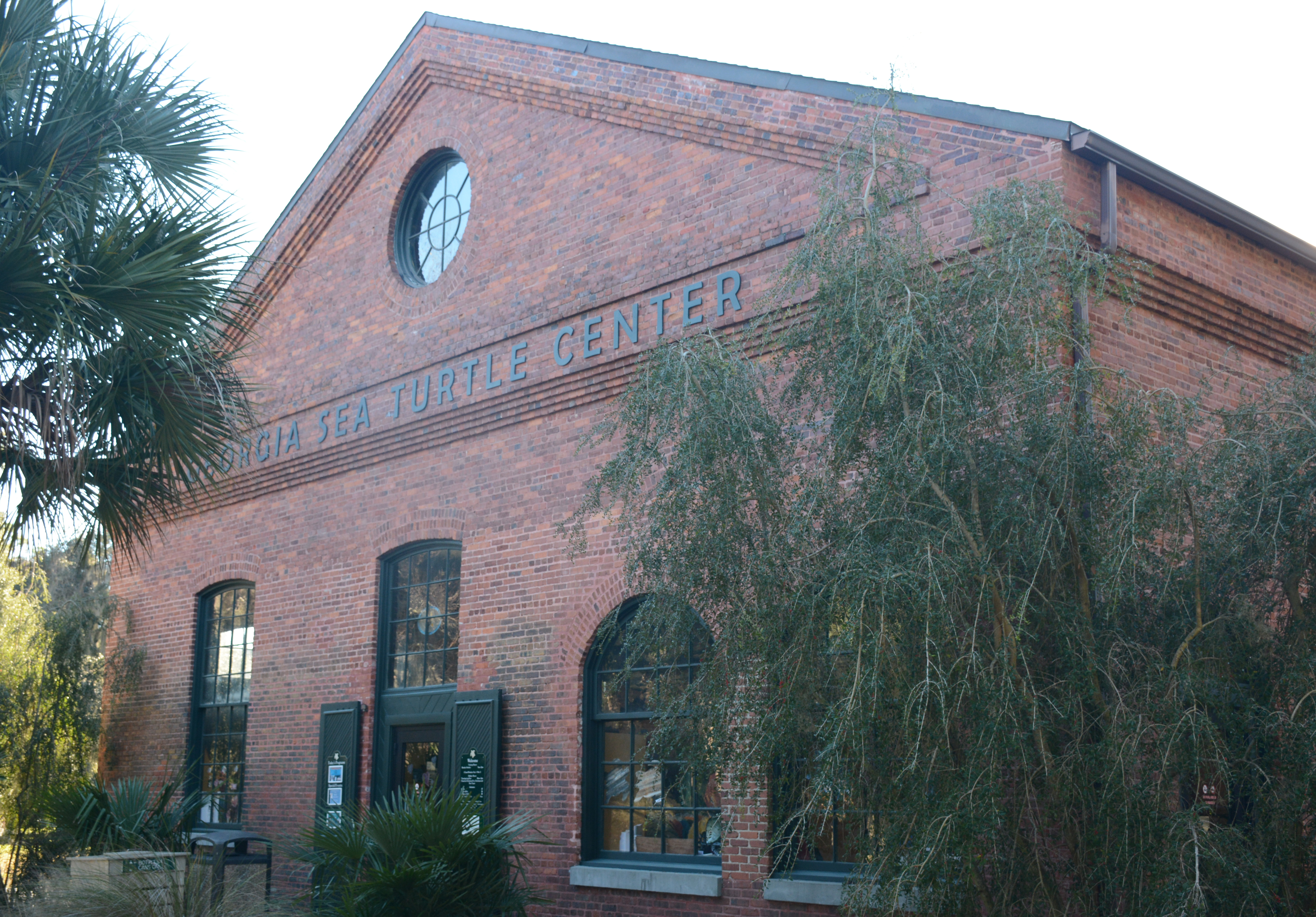
Georgia Sea Turtle Center

The Georgia Sea Turtle Center is a hospital for ill and injured sea turtles. It is the only hospital of its kind in the state of Georgia. The center is open to the general public and offers an interactive Exhibit Gallery and Rehabilitation Pavilion with a number of viewable sea turtle patients.

==== Horton House ====
Major William Horton was granted Jekyll Island by the Trustees of the colony of Georgia in 1738, and he constructed this home in 1743. The Horton House is one of the oldest standing tabby concrete structure exteriors in the state.

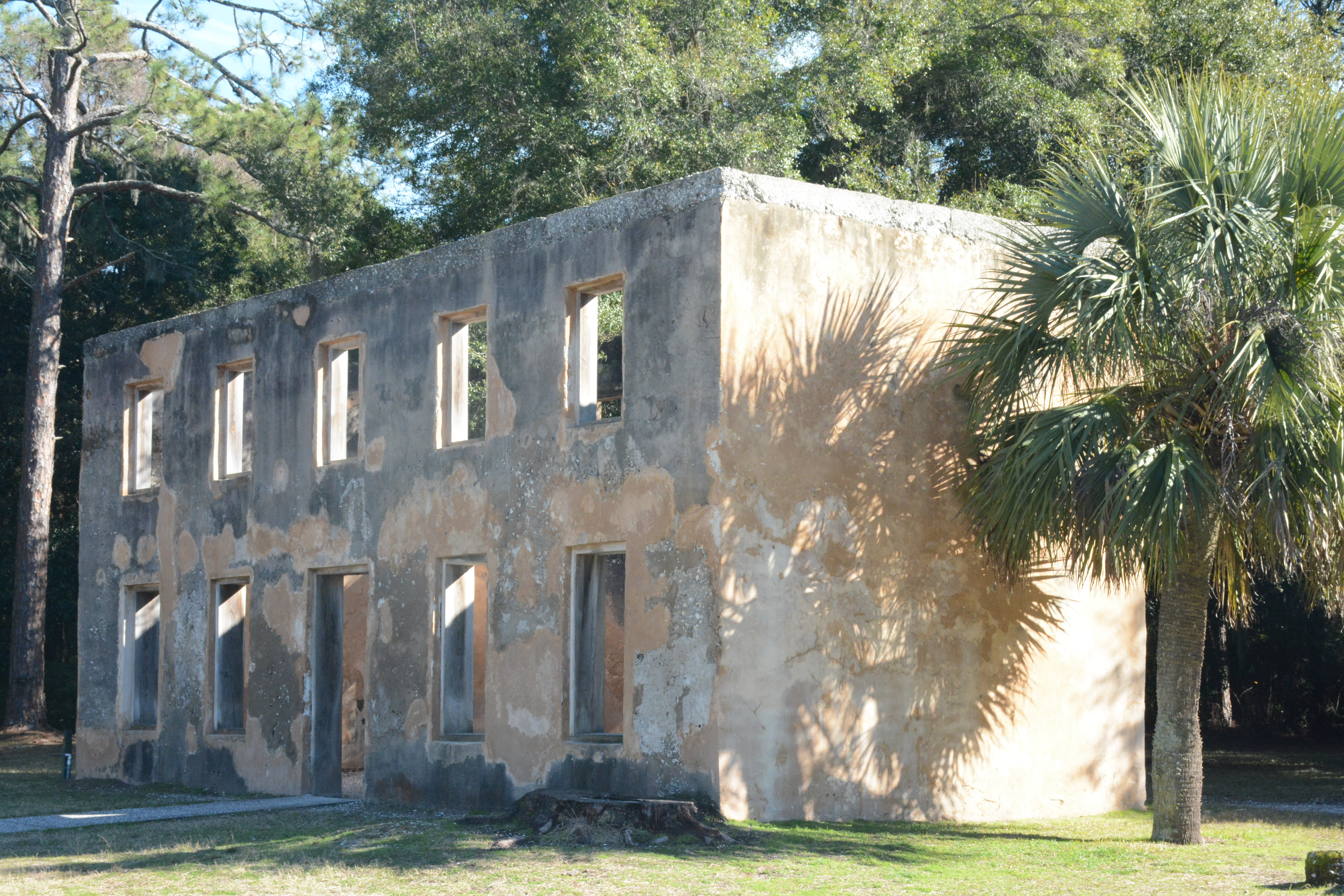
Horton House remains

Horton was one of General James Oglethorpe's top military aids and was in charge of troops garrisoned at Fort Frederica on nearby St. Simons Island. Horton farmed the island, producing crops to aid with supplying Ft. Frederica. This included hops and barley to produce Georgia's first beer. Eventually, Horton added a warehouse to the site, of which remains still exist. His brewery, whose remains lie just down the road, supplied ale to troops and settlers at Fort Frederica on St. Simons Island. Today, the tabby ruins of Georgia's first brewery have mostly fallen into DuBignon Creek.

The site also includes the cemetery of the DuBignon Family, which owned Jekyll from 1790 to 1886 and occupied the house as their home from 1790 until sometime in the mid-1800s. There you can see the grave of John Eugene DuBignon, who sold Jekyll Island to the Jekyll Island Club in the late 1800s.

The Horton House is one of the oldest buildings in Georgia, and the site is listed on the National Register of Historic Places. Preservation work on the site was made possible by a Save America's Treasures grant from the National Park Service, and received an Excellence in Preservation award from the Georgia Trust for Historic Preservation.

The Horton House site is open to the public.

==== Jekyll Island National Historic District ====
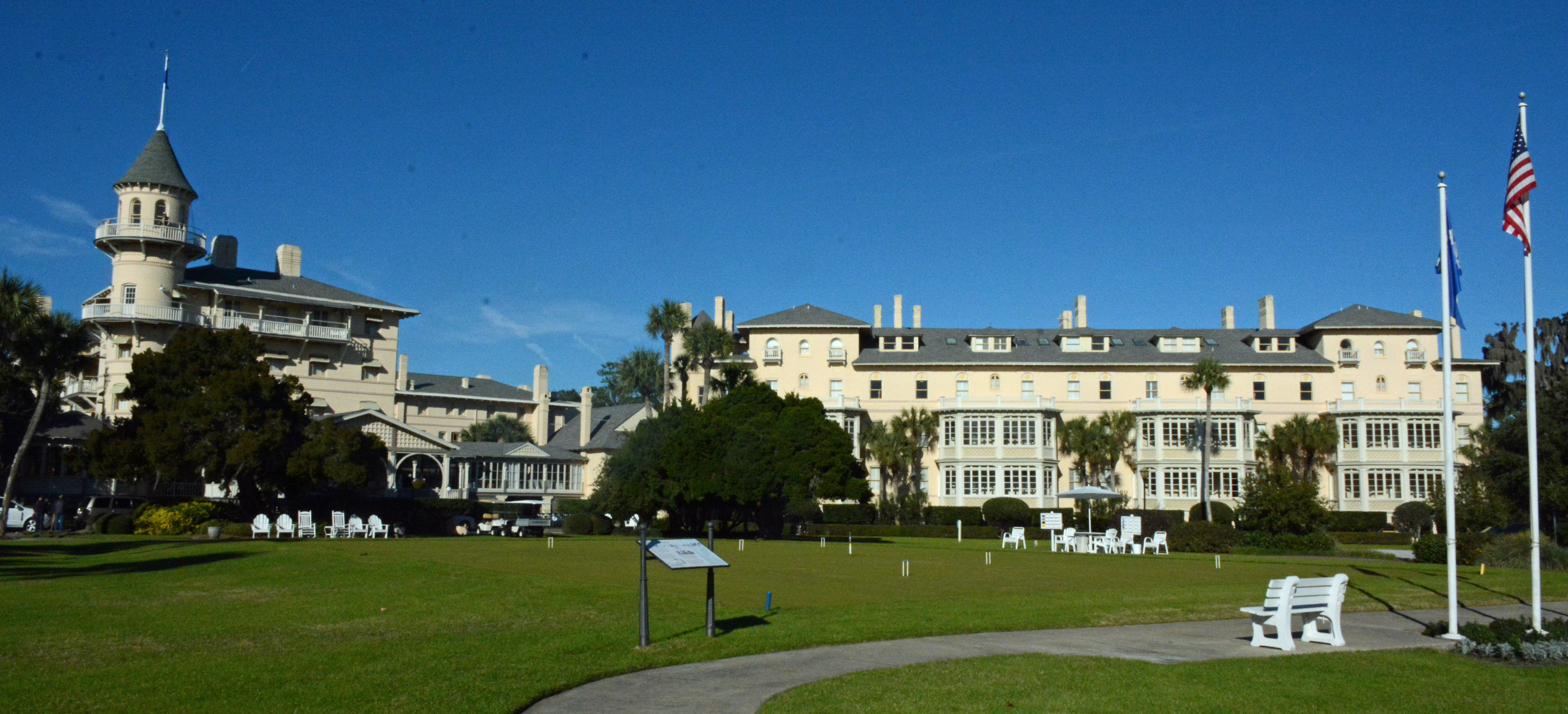
The Jekyll Island Club

The Jekyll Island National Historic Landmark District is one of the largest ongoing restoration projects in the southeastern United States. Jekyll Island was named to the National Trust for Historic Preservation's 12 Distinctive Destinations and received the 2008 Georgia Trust for Historic Preservation's Marguerite William Award for Preservation.

The Jekyll Island Museum interprets stories of the Jekyll Island National Historic District Jekyll Island's history through exhibits, tours and programs.

== Infrastructure ==
=== Transportation ===
- The Port of Brunswick is an Atlantic seaport located in Brunswick, Georgia, United States, in the southeast corner of the state. It is one of four ports operated by the Georgia Ports Authority. The Port of Brunswick is one of the nation's most productive ports on the Atlantic coast. Imported products include wood pulp, paper products, wheat, soybeans, and heavy machinery. Brunswick is the primary U.S. port of automobile imports for manufacturers Jaguar, Land Rover, Porsche, Mitsubishi and Volvo. Ford, GM and Mercedes export vehicles through Port of Brunswick. Other exports include agricultural products such as barley malt, corn and oats; other bulk cargo includes cement, gypsum, limestone, perlite, salt and sand.
- The Glynn County Airport Commission was formed in 1980 to manage and develop opportunities at the county's two airports: Brunswick Golden Isles Airport and McKinnon St. Simons Island Airport. Made up of community leaders, its nine members serve rotating four-year terms.
  - Brunswick Golden Isles Airport (BQK) - Delta Connection flies between Brunswick Golden Isles Airport and Hartsfield–Jackson Atlanta International Airport
  - McKinnon St. Simons Island Airport serves general aviation. The airport has two active runways - 4/22 at 5,800 feet long and 16/34 at 3,313 feet long. Several non-precision approaches provide inclement-weather access, as well as a visual guidance system to assist pilots on landing.
- CSX and Norfolk Southern railways
- Amtrak passenger service
- Sidney Lanier Bridge
- Federal Highways:
  - U.S. Route 17
  - U.S. Route 341
  - U.S. Route 25
  - Interstate 95
- Georgia Department of Transportation
- Federal Transit Administration

=== Health care ===
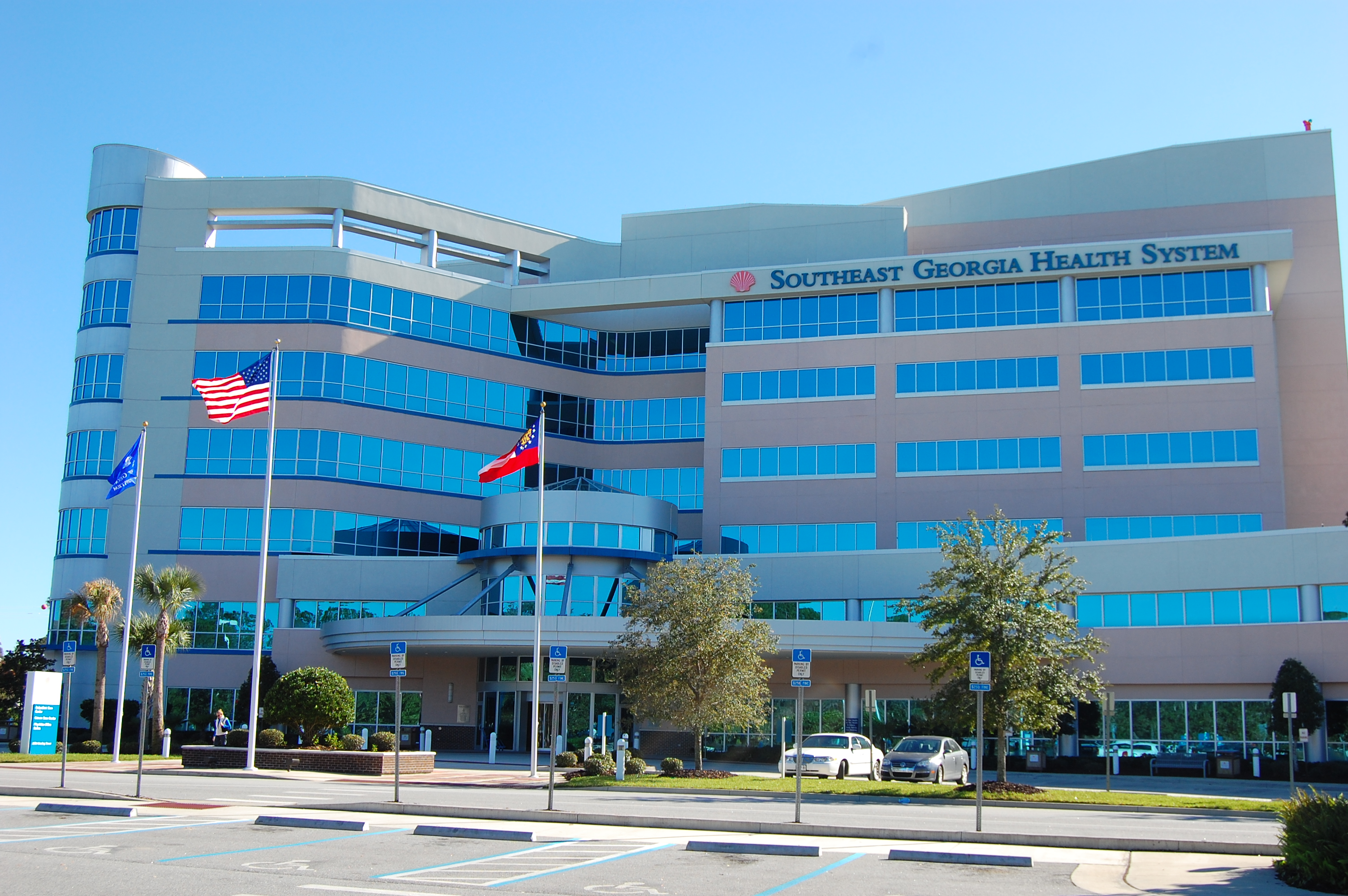
Southeast Georgia Health System's Brunswick campus

* Southeast Georgia Health System

== See also ==
- Colonial Coast
- Lower Coastal Plain (Georgia)
- Sea islands
