= Little St. Simons Island =

Barrier island on the coast of Georgia in the United States

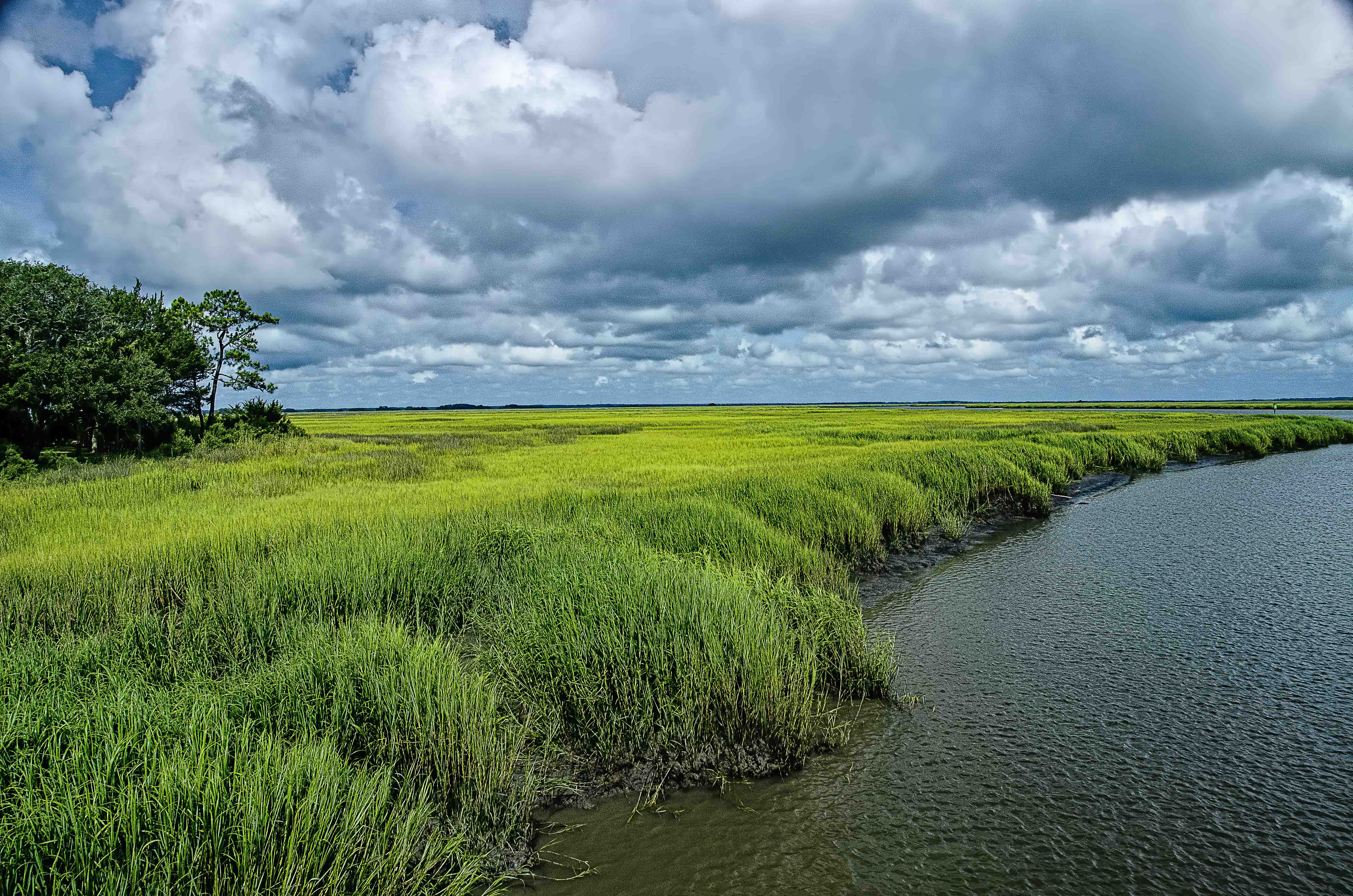
- Salt marshes at Little St. Simon's Island, Georgia, US

- Location within Georgia
- Interactive map of Little St. Simons Island

Geography
- Location: Atlantic Ocean
- Coordinates: 31°17′57″N 81°19′42″W

Administration
- United States
- State: Georgia
- County: Glynn County

Virtually untouched for centuries, Little St. Simons Island is a barrier island located on the coast of the US state of Georgia, and is one of the least developed of Georgia's Golden Isles. The island covers an area of 10,000 acres (40 km^{2}) and boasts 7 miles (11 km) of beaches. Little St. Simons Island is located slightly east and north of St. Simons Island and Sea Island. It is separated from these islands by the Hampton River and from the marshes of the mainland by Buttermilk Sound. The mouth of the Altamaha River opens directly north of the island. The island's continuous growth can be attributed to sediment deposited by the undammed Altamaha.

The island has been privately owned since 1760, and was the Berolzheimer family's private retreat from 1908 until the late 1970s when they opened the Lodge on Little St. Simons. Today, the island remains accessible only by boat, and anyone wishing to visit the island must make arrangements through the lodge office. The Lodge on Little St. Simons provides all-inclusive, overnight accommodations for up to 32 guests. Naturalists offer guided fishing, kayaking, hiking, biking, birding, history and ecological tours. Day trips may also be arranged.

The majority of the island's acreage is composed of salt marsh. The island's maritime forest features cabbage palm, southern live oak, red cedar, red bay, southern magnolia and pines; often draped in Spanish moss. Little St. Simons is host to more than 334 species of birds; some are temporary residents who include the island in their migrations, while others are permanent residents. Species of note include: bald eagles, red knots, painted buntings, roseate spoonbills, black-necked stilts, and wood storks.

Backing the island's beaches are pristine dunes which provide nesting habitat for various shorebirds such as: piping plovers and American oystercatchers. From May to September, Little St. Simons Island's beaches are patrolled daily and signs of loggerhead sea turtle nesting are documented.

Several freshwater ponds provide habitat for tree frogs, alligators; and supply drinking water for other animals including the European fallow deer. Fallow deer were introduced for sport in the early 20th century, and may be seen in three colors: solid white, dark chocolate, and tan with white spots.

Sport fishing in the tidal creeks and surf can be very productive for those in search of redfish, black drum, flounder and speckled trout. Off the shores otters, dolphins, and right whales swim in the inlets and open waters of the Atlantic Ocean.

The island's first owner was Samuel Ougspourger, a Swiss colonist from South Carolina, who purchased the island from King George II, in 1760, and eight years later sold it to his grandson Gabriel Maniqualt. Little St. Simons Island was eventually acquired by Pierce Butler, who ran a rice plantation located in the island's extreme northwestern marsh along the Altamaha River. Butler planned that cotton grown on the island would be very profitable. Abolitionist actress Fanny Kemble, wife of Butler's grandson Pierce Mease Butler, described the island in her journal in 1839 as "a little wide sand heap, covered with thick forest growth." Today the island is owned by the former U.S. Treasury Secretary, Henry Paulson, and his wife Wendy.
