= Margravate of Azilia =

The Margravate of Azilia was a failed effort in 1717 to found a British colony between the Altamaha and Savannah Rivers in the modern-day state of Georgia. The effort was led by Scottish baron Sir Robert Montgomery, who proposed a fortified settlement that would be both produce exotic goods and protect against incursions by Spain and the indigenous peoples of the region. Despite some success in raising funds for the effort, Montgomery failed to secure royal approval and by public enthusiasm for colonization schemes waned after the bursting of the South Sea Bubble. By 1729, the grant reverted to the Province of South Carolina.

== History ==
Sir Robert Montgomery (Note: His surname is sometimes given in contemporary sources as Mountgomery, Montgomerie, or other similar variations.) (1680–1731), fourth baronet and eleventh larid of Skelmorlie, was born at Skelmorlie Castle in Ayrshire, Scotland, to Sir James Montgomery (1660–1694) and Margaret Johnstone, daughter of James Johnstone, Earl of Annandale. While Montgomery was a child, his father invested heavily in the Scottish Stuarts Town colony in the Province of Carolina before it was destroyed by Spanish raiders.

On 19 June 1717, Montgomery secured a grant of land between the Altamaha and Savannah Rivers, which was nominally part of the Province of South Carolina following the division of the Province of Carolina in 1712. He quickly outlined his plans for the colony in a prospectus: A Discourse Concerning the Design'd Establishment of a New Colony to the South of Carolina in the Most delightful County of the Universe.

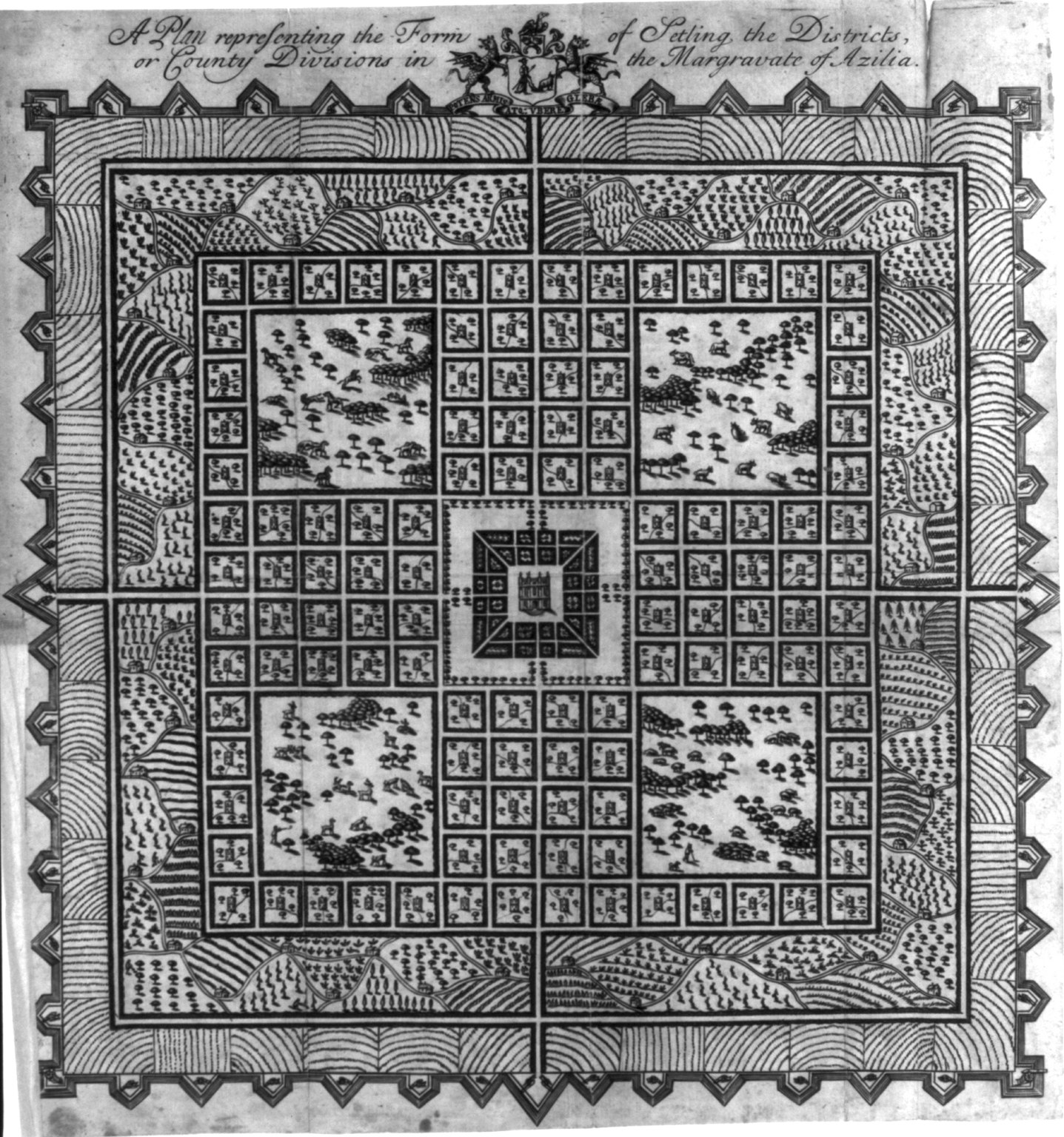
Robert Montgomery’s 1717 map of the proposed Margravate of Azilia

He proposed calling the territory the "Margravate of Azilia" and outlined a settlement plan margraves of the Holy Roman Empire. Due to the potential for clashes with both indigenous peoples of the region and Spanish forces at Saint Augustine who also held claim over the territory, the margrave model of fortified settlement that would grow outward from a central city as the population increased was appealing to Robert. His plan called for forts along the rivers, as well as a large, fortified city, divided into 116 squares measuring 640 acres (260 hectares) each, four forested reserves for common use, public fields, and a large private estate in the center. If completed, the area within the fortifications would have measured 289 square miles (750 km^{2}).

Comparing the latitude of Azilia to "Palestine Herself, That promis'd Canaan, which was pointed out by God's own Choice, to bless the Labours of a favourite People," Montgomery envisioned Azilia as a source of exotic goods, including coffee, tea, figs, raisins, currents, almonds, olives, silk, wine, and cochineal, as well as potash. In 1720, Montgomery published a second treatise, A Description of the Golden Islands, With an Account of the Undertaking Now on Foot for Making a Settlement There, highlighting the Golden Isles of the Azilian Coast. For the English, a fortified colony like Azilia had appeal not just for the goods it might produce, but also for its position as a buffer to French and Spanish ambitions in the area.

Montgomery successfully raised funds for the project—£30,000 by July of 1718—and was appointed by the lord proprietors of Province of South Carolina as "governor for life" of the new territory. However, when the grant was submitted to King George I for royal approval, the attorney general determined that the grant could not be separated from the laws of South Carolina. Progress on the Azilia project was further disrupted by the Revolution of 1719, which ousted the lords proprietor and installed a new governor for South Carolina, as well as greater skepticism of colonial ventures following the collapse of the French Mississippi Company and the bursting of the South Sea Bubble, both of which occurred in the second half of 1720. By September 1720, the Privy Council was moving to dissuade possible settlers in the project, and by 1729 the land grant reverted to the crown. In 1732, the land of margravate was included in the grant to James Oglethorpe of a royal charter for the Province of Georgia.

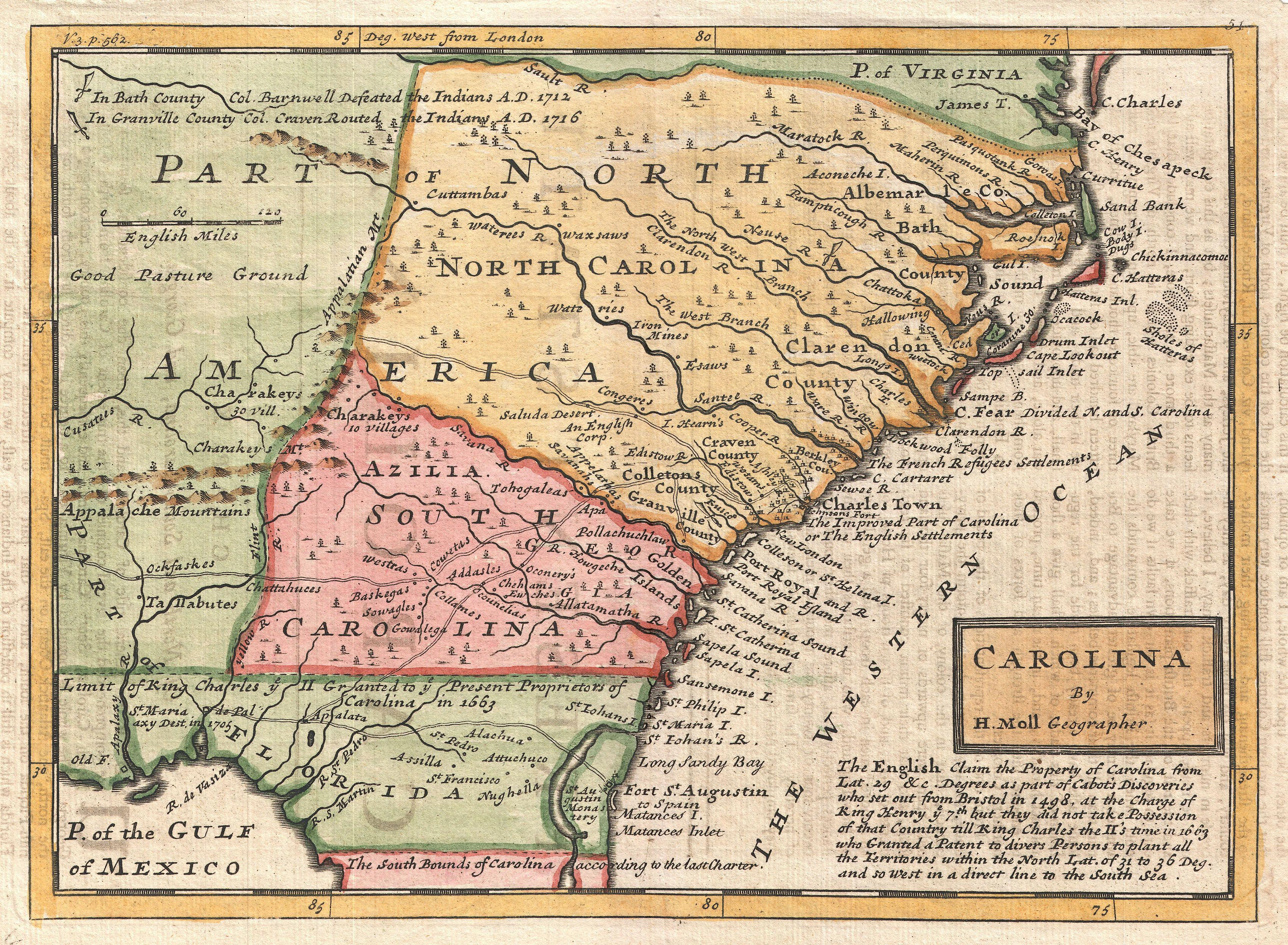
Moll's 1746 Map of Carolina, including Azilia.

Although the Azilia plan was never enacted, the territory was shown in maps by English cartographer Herman Moll. His 1720 map labeled the territory as the Margravate of Azilia; however, a 1729 map labeled it simply as "Azilia." As Georgia state historian William Bacon Stevens noted in 1847, "The Margravate of Azilia was magnificent upon the map, but was impracticable in reality."
