= Epworth by the Sea =

American Christian conference and retreat center

Coordinates: 31°10′24.6″N 081°24′21.4″W

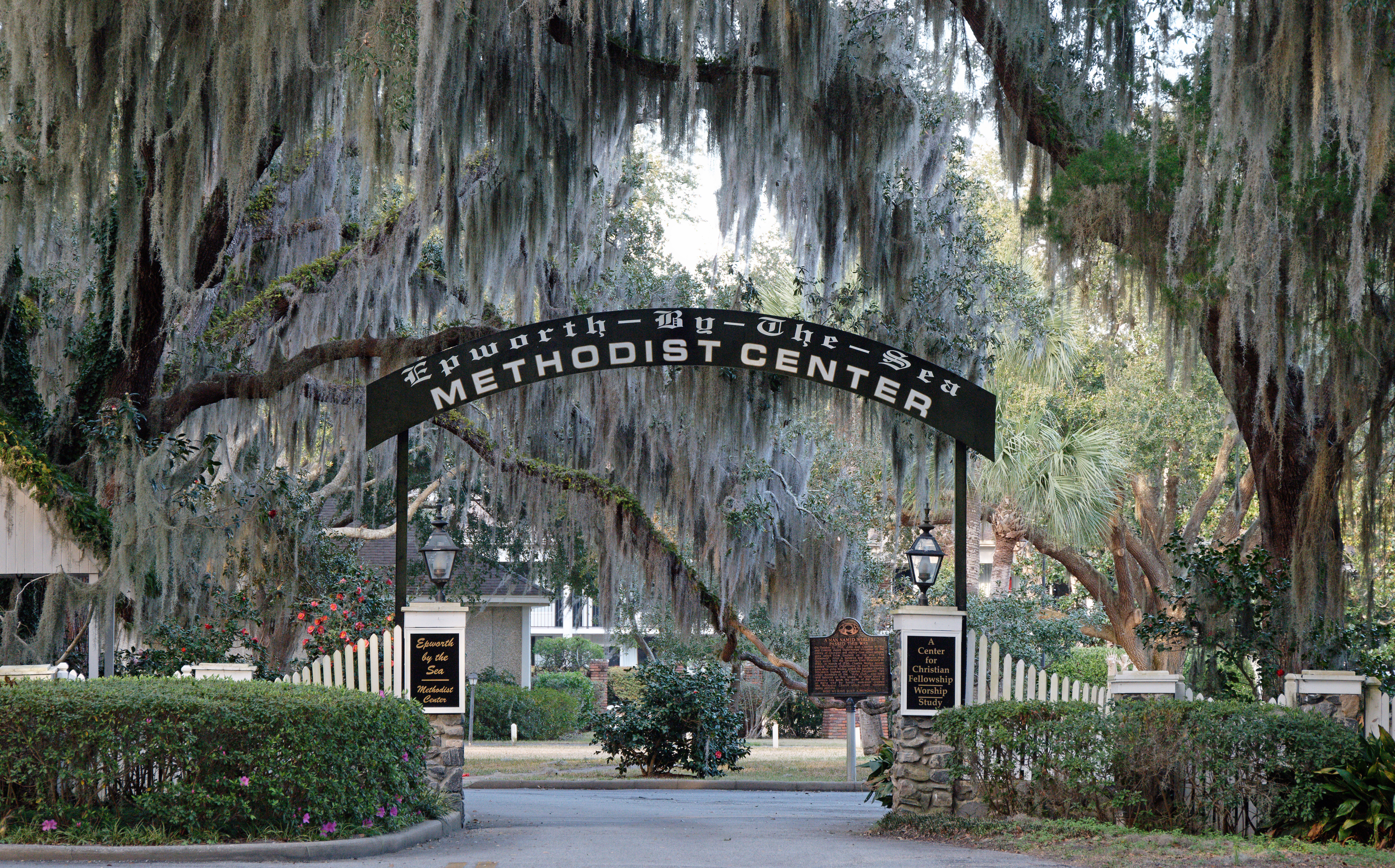
Southern entrance

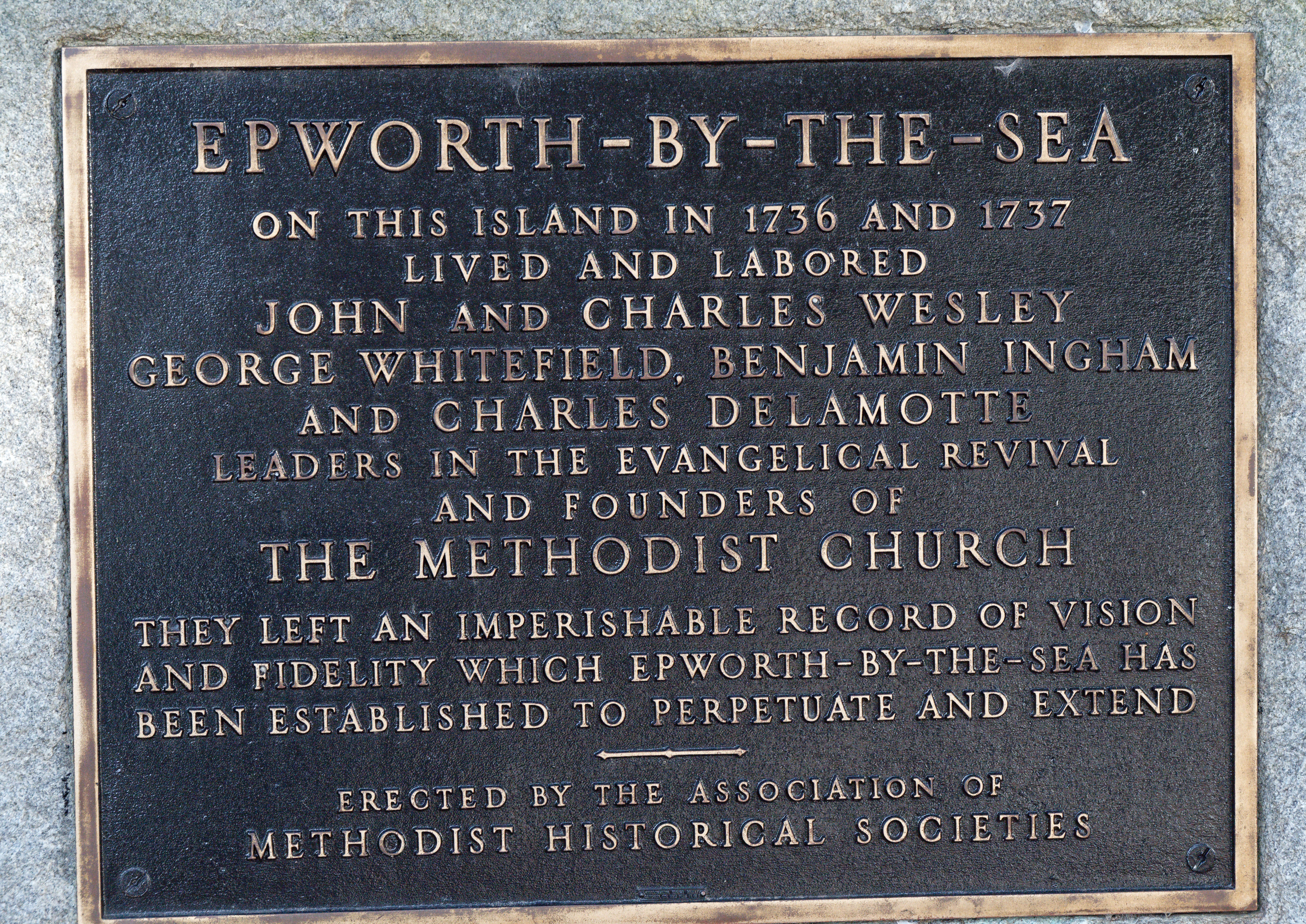
Plaque

Epworth by the Sea is an 83-acre Christian conference and retreat center in Georgia, United States. It is used for Methodist-based events. It is located on the banks of the Frederica River, north of Gascoigne Bluff on Saint Simons Island, Georgia. The center was named "Epworth by the Sea" in honor of Epworth, the boyhood home of Charles and John Wesley, founders of Methodism. It is owned and operated by the South Georgia Conference of the United Methodist Church. Epworth is located on part of Hamilton Plantation which was purchased on October 29, 1949. It opened to the public in 1950, under the leadership of Bishop Arthur James Moore. Moore, from Georgia, was an elected bishop in the Methodist Episcopal Church, and also a leader of the Atlanta Area of the Methodist Church. At the start, the center featured only a few rural camp facilities and old plantation buildings. Epworth's stated mission is "to provide a Christian place for worship, study and fellowship."

== Epworth by the Sea facilities ==
Lovely Lane Chapel

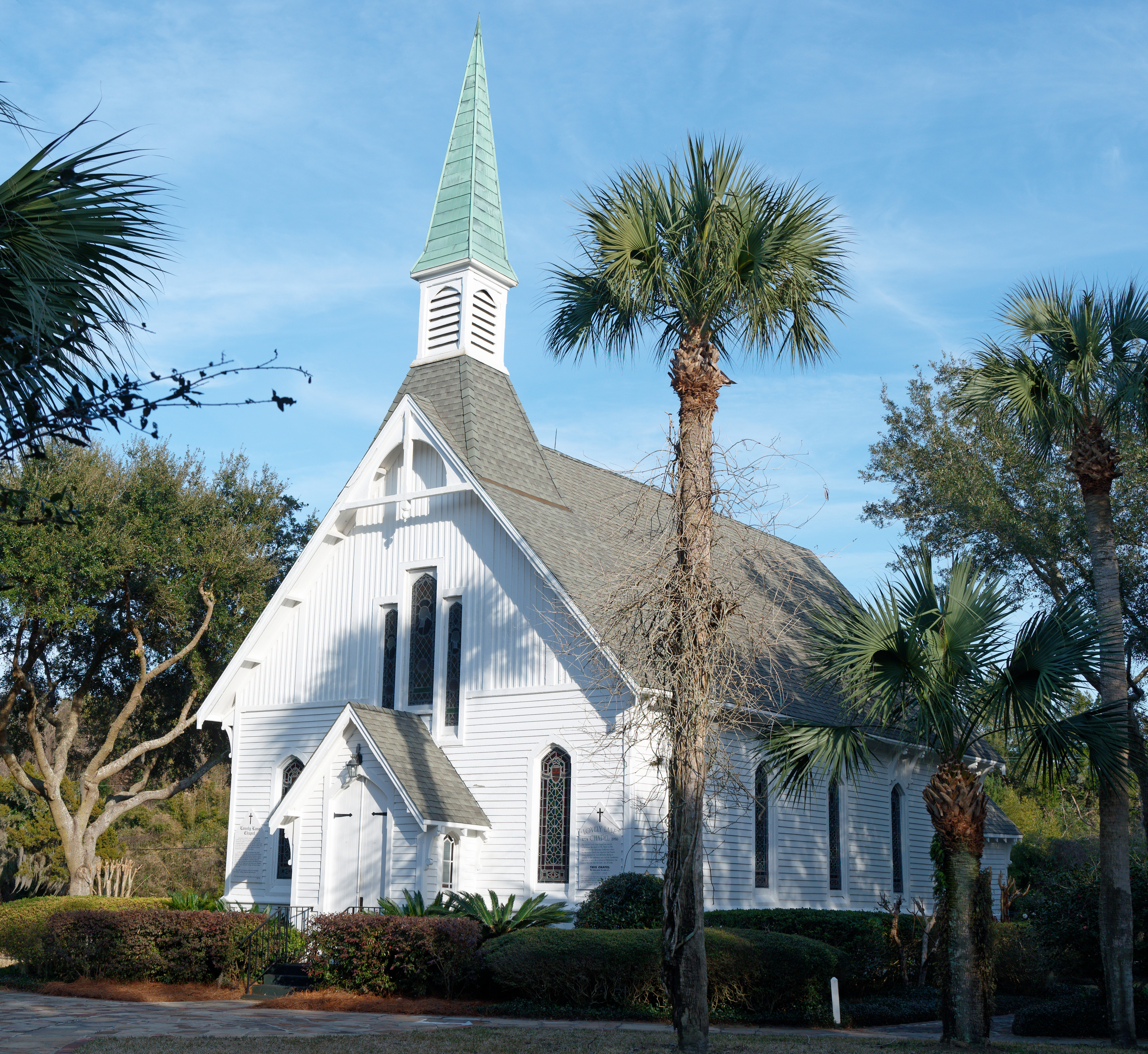
Lovely Lane

According to the center's official website, Lovely Lane Chapel is one of Saint Simons's oldest standing church buildings. Constructed in 1880, it is currently used only for Sunday services and, by appointment, weddings.

Wright Prayer Tower

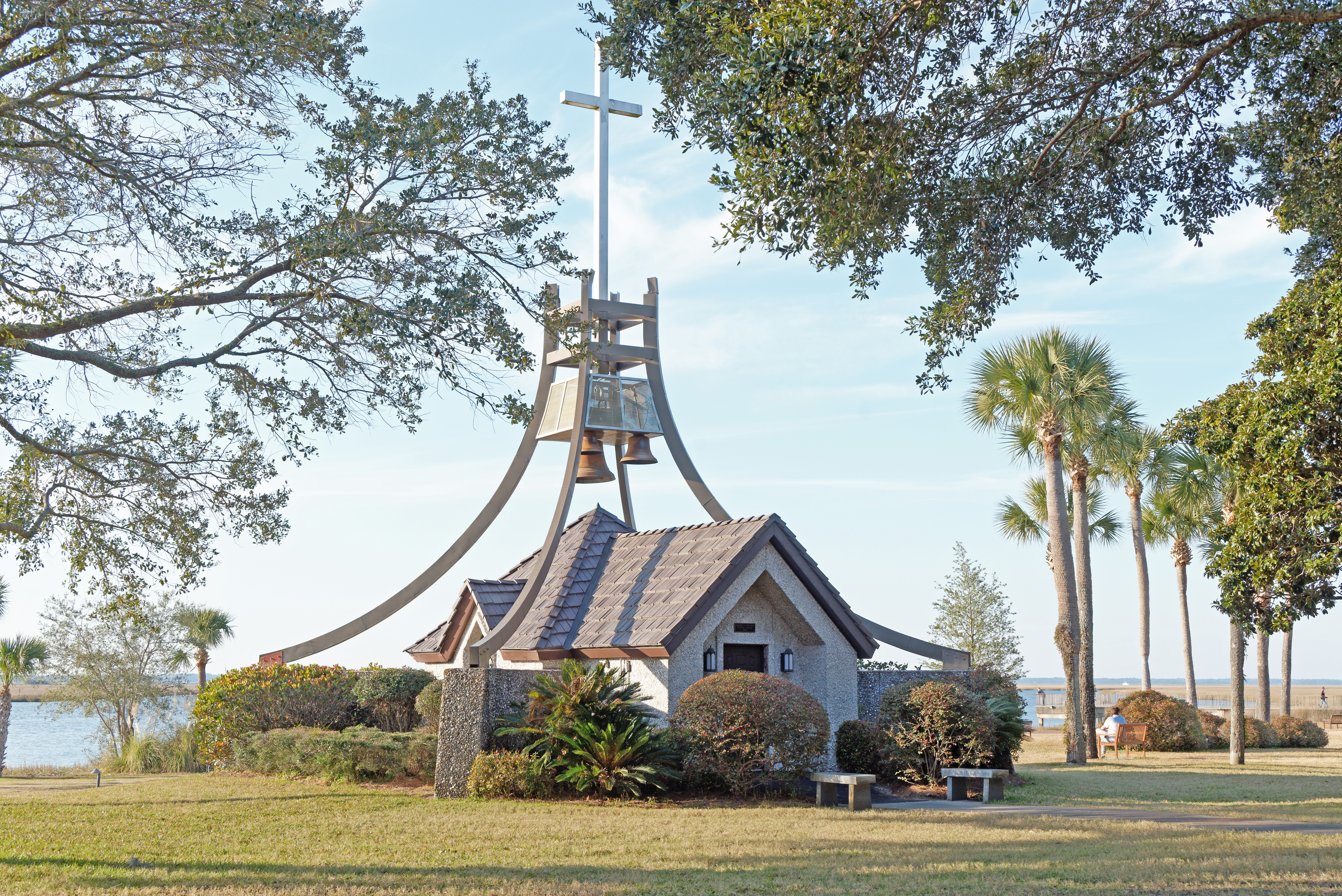
Prayer tower

The Wright Prayer Tower was erected on the Frederica River and adjacent to Glynn County marshes.

Gazebo

The Epworth by the Sea Gazebo is at a diagonal from the Wright Prayer Tower and near the James Pier.

Recreation services

Epworth by the Sea's recreational services include a Youth Center Pavilion with a covered basketball court, two tennis courts, an open field for baseball, football, and soccer; swimming pool, two fishing piers and an adventure challenge rope course.

Arthur Moore Methodist Museum

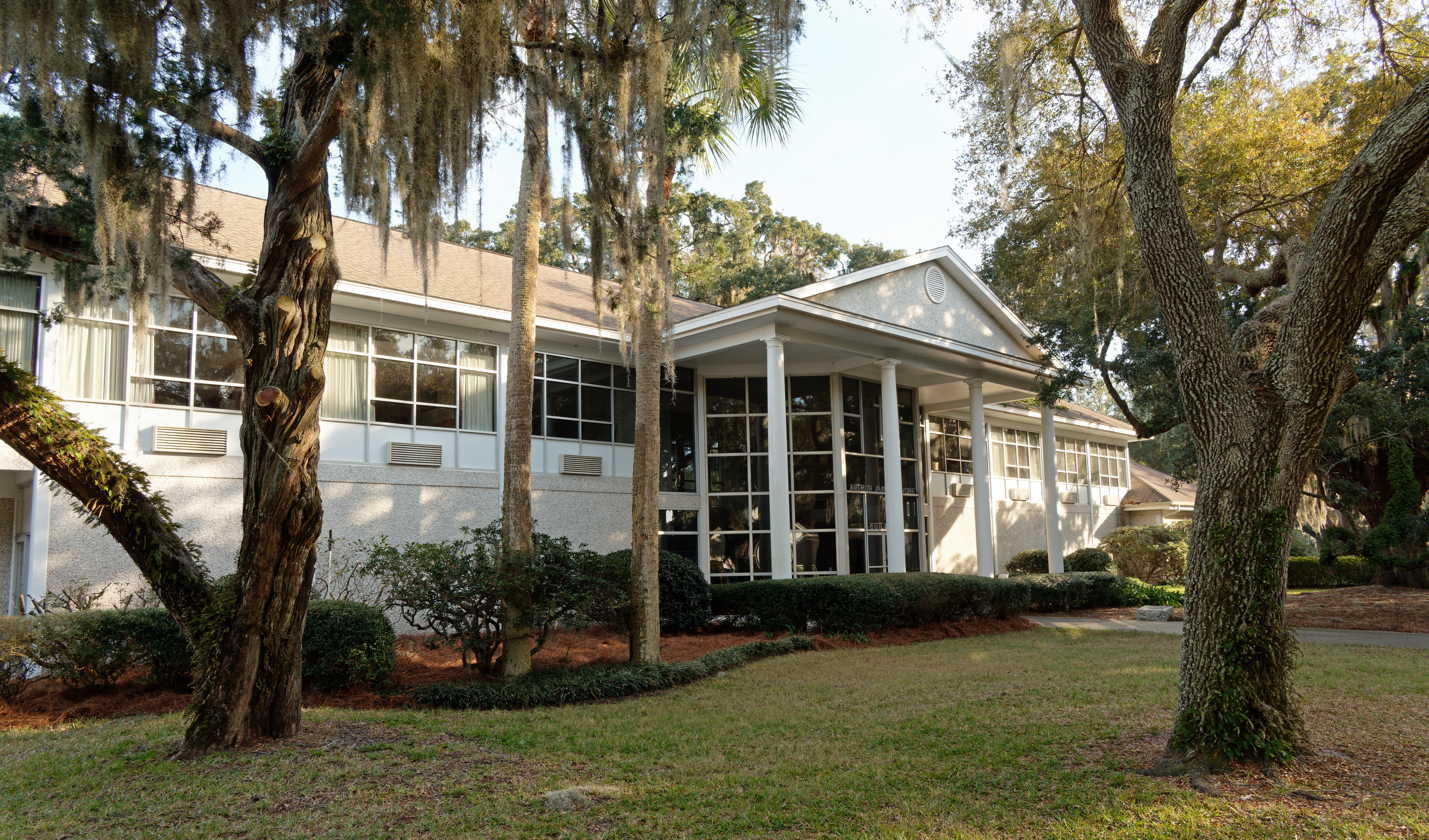
Moore Museum

The Arthur J. Moore Methodist Museum and Library was established in 1965. It began as a small library and became a museum when it was dedicated in June 1966 and given its current name. It is where the South Georgia Conference of the United Methodist Church stores its archival records. The library consists of over 6,000 books which are used by theologians pursuing research into Methodist theology and history. The collection includes books, journals, diaries, original letters and historic documents about the culture and history of the Methodist Church.

Meeting facilities

The meeting facilities that were built for Epworth by the Sea, include The Smith Dining Room, Blasingame Dining Room, Cannon Room, Jinks Garden Room, Turner Lodge Pioneer Room, Nalls Auditorium, The Tabby House, and the Margaret A. Pitts Conference Room. These are just some of the many ways that Epworth is able to accommodate both large and small groups.

Housing facilities

The housing facilities at Epworth by the Sea accommodate up to approximately 1,000 people including 223 private rooms, 12 family apartments and 22 youth cabins.

Waters Garden

The Waters Garden is a small, passive-use garden which contains a “Walkway of Remembrance,” where it is traditional for visitors to the center to remember their deceased family and friends.

== Camps held at Epworth by the Sea ==
Camp Discovery

Camp Discovery began as a center for low-income children in 1992.

Elementary Camp

The center's one-week Elementary Camp provides educational opportunities and teaches Bible Study with a Methodist focus to children, ages 4–12.

Georgia Pastors' School

The Georgia Pastors' School provides educational opportunities and spiritual experiences to religious leaders employed within the Methodist Church or seeking such employment.

Women's Retreat SSI

The retreat for women, held at Epworth by the Sea each year, features famous speakers such as Barbra Lee Johnson, the founder and director of Total Life Ministries.

== The Gathering Place ==
A tradition at Epworth by the Sea

The Gathering Place, better known as "The Main Event", is held on Sunday nights throughout the summer in one of Epworth by the Sea's facilities, (The Strickland Auditorium). Over 1,000 teens gather together from all over to learn about faith and the miracle of knowing Christ. Students create and share music, skits and games followed by nationally recognized speakers.

== Equipping programs of The Gathering Place ==
Programs offered by The Gathering Place to help train and equip students to be effective Christian leaders throughout their schools, churches, and communities.

707

Close to 500 students in the community meet together weekly in a small group setting, which is led by a Christian adult.

Intern programs

The intern programs that the Gathering Place hosts, are used for training high school and college students the values of being a Christian leader.

== Funding ==
Epworth by the Sea is largely funded by the William I. H. and Lula E. Pitts Foundation, a private foundation that funds educational and social service activities through organizations that are associated with the United Methodist Church in Georgia. Since the foundation was founded in 1941, large donations have gone to support institutions and organizations such as Epworth by the Sea, Andrew College, Candler School of Theology in Emory University, Atlanta Georgia, LaGrange College and Magnolia Manor retirement home. Once Pitts died in 1964, he had already donated more than $1 million.
