= Azilia eryngioides =

Scientific classification
- Kingdom: Plantae
- Clade: Tracheophytes
- Clade: Angiosperms
- Clade: Eudicots
- Clade: Asterids
- Order: Apiales
- Family: Apiaceae
- Subfamily: Apioideae
- Genus: Azilia; Hedge & Lamond
- Species: A. eryngioides

Binomial name
- Azilia eryngioides (Pau) Hedge & Lamond

Synonyms
- Prangos eryngioides Pau

Genus of flowering plants

Azilia eryngioides is a species of flowering plant in the family Apiaceae, endemic to Iran. It is the only species in the genus Azilia.
