= List of shipwrecks in 1778 =

The List of shipwrecks in 1778 includes some ships sunk, wrecked or otherwise lost during 1778.

table of contents
1778
Jan	Feb	Mar	Apr
May	Jun	Jul	Aug
Sep	Oct	Nov	Dec
Unknown date

== January ==
=== 1 January ===
List of shipwrecks: 1 January 1778
Ship	State	Description
Nesbitt	United States	American Revolutionary War:The merchant brig was captured by HMS Perseus ( (Kingdom of Great Britain) Royal Navy) 8 leagues west north west of Port Royal. Burned later that day.
Unnamed	Great Britain	American Revolutionary War:The sloop was stripped and sunk by Patriots in the Delaware River between Philadelphia and Chester, Pennsylvania.

=== 3 January ===
List of shipwrecks: 3 January 1778
Ship	State	Description
Alexandrine	Kingdom of France	American Revolutionary War:The merchant brig ran aground in the Rappahannock River and was captured by HMS Richmond and HMS Emerald ( (Kingdom of Great Britain) Royal Navy) off Cape Henry. Destroyed later that day.
Betsy	United States	American Revolutionary War:The merchant schooner was captured by HMS Phoenix ( (Kingdom of Great Britain) Royal Navy) off Cape Henry. Destroyed later that day.

=== 4 January ===
List of shipwrecks: 4 January 1778
Ship	State	Description
Dragon	United States	American Revolutionary War:The merchant schooner ran aground and was captured by HMS Emerald ( (Kingdom of Great Britain) Royal Navy) in the Rappahannock River. Refloated on 5 January.
Elegante	Kingdom of France	American Revolutionary War:The merchant snow ran aground and was captured by HMS Emerald ( (Kingdom of Great Britain) Royal Navy) in the Rappahannock River. Refloated on 6 January.

=== 6 January ===
List of shipwrecks: 6 January 1778
Ship	State	Description
Speedwell	United States	American Revolutionary War:The merchant sloop (30 GRT) was captured by HMS Galatea ( (Kingdom of Great Britain) Royal Navy) off Charles Town, South Carolina, at (33°18′N 76°28′W). Prise was destroyed.
Unnamed	Great Britain	The large merchant schooner was driven aground at the "Pea Patch" in the Delaware River as a result of ice breaching the hull.

=== 10 January ===
List of shipwrecks: 10 January 1778
Ship	State	Description
Friends	United States	American Revolutionary War:The merchant brig was captured by Royal Navy ships off Nantucket Shoals. She was stripped and burned.
Polly	United States	American Revolutionary War:The merchant brig was captured by HMS Phoenix ( (Kingdom of Great Britain) Royal Navy) off Cape Henry. She was stripped of her sails and destroyed.
Unnamed	United States	American Revolutionary War:The merchant schooner ran aground and was captured by HMS Ariadne ( (Kingdom of Great Britain) Royal Navy) off Englishmans Head.

=== 11 January ===
List of shipwrecks: 11 January 1778
Ship	State	Description
Britania	United States	American Revolutionary War:The merchant brigantine (40 GRT) was chased ashore by HMS Unicorn ( (Kingdom of Great Britain) Royal Navy) under a fort on Point Judith, Rhode Island.
Hawke	United States	American Revolutionary War:The merchant sloop (30 GRT) was chased ashore by HMS Unicorn ( (Kingdom of Great Britain) Royal Navy) off Stoney Town, Connecticut.
Industry	United States	American Revolutionary War:The merchant brigantine (30 GRT) was chased ashore by HMS Unicorn ( (Kingdom of Great Britain) Royal Navy) under a fort on Point Judith, Rhode Island.
Sally	United States	American Revolutionary War:The merchant sloop (20 GRT) was chased ashore by HMS Unicorn ( (Kingdom of Great Britain) Royal Navy) under a fort on Point Judith, Rhode Island.
Sally	United States	American Revolutionary War:The merchant schooner, probably Sally (20 GRT), was chased ashore by HMS Lark ( (Kingdom of Great Britain) Royal Navy) in or near the Providence River and was burned.

=== 12 January ===
List of shipwrecks: 12 January 1778
Ship	State	Description
Unnamed	United States	American Revolutionary War:The merchant vessel, probably brig Ann, was chased ashore by HMS Lark, HMS Perseus and HMS Carysfort all ( (Kingdom of Great Britain) Royal Navy) near Edesto Island.

=== 16 January ===
List of shipwrecks: 16 January 1778
Ship	State	Description
Rachael	United States	American Revolutionary War:The merchant schooner (25 GRT) was captured by HMS Carysfort ( (Kingdom of Great Britain) Royal Navy) off Charles Town, South Carolina, and was scuttled.

=== 17 January ===
List of shipwrecks: 17 January 1778
Ship	State	Description
Friendship	United States	American Revolutionary War:The merchant sloop was captured by HMS Apollo ( (Kingdom of Great Britain) Royal Navy) on the southern end of the Georges Bank and was burned.
Sphynx	United States	The merchant sloop went ashore on Brenton's Neck, near Newport, Rhode Island, and was captured by British infantry.

=== 22 January ===
List of shipwrecks: 22 January 1778
Ship	State	Description
Linkhorn	United States	American Revolutionary War:The merchant sloop was captured by HMS Apollo ( (Kingdom of Great Britain) Royal Navy) off Cape Sable and was burned due to poor condition.

=== 28 January ===
List of shipwrecks: 28 January 1778
Ship	State	Description
Unnamed	Flag unknown	American Revolutionary War:The schooner was chased ashore by HMS Solebay ( (Kingdom of Great Britain) Royal Navy) near Cape Henry, schooner destroyed later that day.

=== 29 January ===
List of shipwrecks: 29 January 1778
Ship	State	Description
Unnamed	Flag unknown	American Revolutionary War:The unidentified schooner was captured off Charles Town by HMS Carysfort ( (Kingdom of Great Britain) Royal Navy) and was destroyed.
Two unnamed vessels	Great Britain	American Revolutionary War:The vessels, American vessels captured by privateer sloop Gayton (Jamaica), were captured during a Raid on Nassau, Bahamas by USS Providence (United States Navy) and were burned.

=== 31 January ===
List of shipwrecks: 31 January 1778
Ship	State	Description
Unnamed	United States	American Revolutionary War:The unidentified schooner was captured in Chesapeake Bay by two boats from HMS St. Albans ( (Kingdom of Great Britain) Royal Navy) and was burned.

=== Unknown date ===
List of shipwrecks: unknown date in January 1778
Ship	State	Description
Active	Great Britain	The captured Massachusetts privateer brigantine was wrecked on the New Jersey coast on or before 12 January. Crew of 20 captured.
Hope	Great Britain	American Revolutionary War:The schooner was forced ashore by ice in the Delaware River near Chester, Pennsylvania, between 6 and 29 January and was captured.
Industry	Great Britain	American Revolutionary War:The schooner was forced ashore by ice in the Delaware River near Chester, Pennsylvania, between 6 and 29 January and was captured.
John	(Kingdom of Great Britain) Royal Navy	American Revolutionary War:The transport brig was forced ashore by ice in the Delaware River near Chester, Pennsylvania, between 6 January and 29 January and was captured.
Lord Howe	(Kingdom of Great Britain) Royal Navy	American Revolutionary War:The transport brig was forced ashore by ice in the Delaware River near Chester, Pennsylvania, between 6 and 29 January and was captured.
Rawleigh	Great Britain	The armed brigantine foundered in a storm in the western Atlantic in January or February. Crew was rescued by HMS Experiment ( (Kingdom of Great Britain) Royal Navy) as the ship sank.
Symmetry	Great Britain	The transport brig ran aground near Wilmington, Delaware, between 6 and 29 January and was captured.

== February ==
=== 2 February ===
List of shipwrecks: 2 February 1778
Ship	State	Description
Hero	Great Britain	American Revolutionary War: The ship (350 GRT 1766) blew up and sank near Antigua during a battle with an American schooner. Only the mate and ten crew survived.

=== 3 February ===
List of shipwrecks: 3 February 1778
Ship	State	Description
Sea Flower	United States	American Revolutionary War:The schooner was captured 21 Leagues off Nantucket by HMS Unicorn ( (Kingdom of Great Britain) Royal Navy) and was burned.

=== 4 February ===
List of shipwrecks: 4 February 1778
Ship	State	Description
Unnamed	United States	American Revolutionary War:The schooner was captured in the James River by boats from HMS St. Albans ( (Kingdom of Great Britain) Royal Navy) and was burned.

=== 5 February ===
List of shipwrecks: 5 February 1778
Ship	State	Description
Unnamed	United States	American Revolutionary War:The sloop ran aground off Cherry Point while being pursued by HMS Richmond and HMS Solebay both ( (Kingdom of Great Britain) Royal Navy) and was burned.

=== 7 February ===
List of shipwrecks: 7 February 1778
Ship	State	Description
Petit Camarade	Kingdom of France	American Revolutionary War: The vessel had run aground, breaking her rudder and main mast, and was captured by HMS St Albans ( (Kingdom of Great Britain) Royal Navy) and burned in Lynnhaven Bay.
Unnamed	Flag unknown	American Revolutionary War: The sloop was captured by HMS Richmond ( (Kingdom of Great Britain) Royal Navy) and burned off Cape Charles.

=== 11 February ===
List of shipwrecks: 11 February 1778
Ship	State	Description
HMS Liverpool	(Kingdom of Great Britain) Royal Navy	The Coventry-class frigate was wrecked in Jamaica Bay, off Long Island, New York, United States.

=== 14 February ===
List of shipwrecks: 14 February 1778
Ship	State	Description
Defiance	United States	American Revolutionary War:The sloop was captured off Hampton Creek, Virginia by boats from HMS St. Albans ( (Kingdom of Great Britain) Royal Navy) and was burned.
Shore	United States	American Revolutionary War:The Virginia State Govt. owned trading sloop was captured off Hampton Creek, Virginia by boats from HMS St. Albans ( (Kingdom of Great Britain) Royal Navy) and was burned.

=== 25 February ===
List of shipwrecks: 25 February 1778
Ship	State	Description
Unnamed	Great Britain	American Revolutionary War:The brig was burned at Long Island, NY by troops of the 6th Connecticut Regiment.
Unnamed	Great Britain	American Revolutionary War:The schooner was burned at Long Island, NY by troops of the 6th Connecticut Regiment.
Unnamed	Great Britain	American Revolutionary War:The armed sloop was burned at Long Island, NY by troops of the 6th Connecticut Regiment.

=== 28 February ===
List of shipwrecks: 11 February 1778
Ship	State	Description
Hampden	United States	American Revolutionary War:The Massachusetts privateer brigantine (120 tons, 10 guns) ran aground on Martinico while under pursuit by HMS Seaford ( (Kingdom of Great Britain) Royal Navy). She was captured, refloated, and sent to Dominica.

=== Unknown date ===
List of shipwrecks: Unknown date in February 1778
Ship	State	Description
Rawleigh	Great Britain	The armed brigantine foundered in a storm in the western Atlantic in January or February. Crew was rescued by HMS Experiment ( (Kingdom of Great Britain) Royal Navy) as the ship sank.

== March ==
=== 7 March ===
List of shipwrecks: 7 March 1778
Ship	State	Description
USS Randolph	(United States) Continental Navy	The frigate was sunk in the Atlantic Ocean in an engagement with Ship-of-the-Line HMS Yarmouth ( (Kingdom of Great Britain) Royal Navy) when her magazine exploded with the loss of 311 of her 315 crew. The 4 survivors were rescued off of wreckage by Yarmouth on 12 March.

=== 9 March ===
List of shipwrecks: 9 March 1778
Ship	State	Description
Alert	British Army	American Revolutionary War:The armed schooner, belonging to the British Army Dept. of Engineers, was captured on 7 March by Continental & Pennsylvania State Navy vessels. She was run aground, set on fire and partially flooded in the Delaware River off New Castle, Delaware, to prevent being recaptured. Refloated by the British the next day.
Kitty	Great Britain	American Revolutionary War:The transport was burned in the Delaware River off New Castle, Delaware, after being captured by Continental & Pennsylvania State Navy vessels on the 7th.
Mermaid	Great Britain	American Revolutionary War:The transport was burned in the Delaware River off New Castle, Delaware, after being captured by Continental & Pennsylvania State Navy vessels on the 7th.

=== 12 March ===
List of shipwrecks: 12 March 1778
Ship	State	Description
Tonnere	Kingdom of France	American Revolutionary War:The ship (350 tons) was destroyed by the British after running aground off Smith's Island. Prize credit to HMS Senegal ( (Kingdom of Great Britain) Royal Navy).

=== 18 March ===
List of shipwrecks: 12 March 1778
Ship	State	Description
Unnamed	United States	American Revolutionary War:The sloop was captured aground in Seaconnett Passage, Rhode Island by HMS Kingfisher ( (Kingdom of Great Britain) Royal Navy). Unable to be refloated, she was burned.

=== 22 March ===
List of shipwrecks: 22 March 1778
Ship	State	Description
Hammon	United States	The privateer schooner ran aground near LaHave, Nova Scotia, when attacked by schooner/tender HMS Arbuthnot ( (Kingdom of Great Britain) Royal Navy) and was captured, pulled off and taken to Halifax, Nova Scotia. 19 of 25 crew escaped from being captured.
Unnamed	(Kingdom of Great Britain) Royal Navy	A Tender of frigate HMS Roebuck ran ashore in the early hours, at Cape Henlopen and was burned to prevent capture in the morning, her 21 crew were captured. 8 carriage and 4 swivel guns were salvaged by the Americans.
Unnamed	(Kingdom of Great Britain) Royal Navy	American Revolutionary War:A tender of HMS Enterprize ( (Kingdom of Great Britain) Royal Navy), captured on 20 March by USS Revenge (United States Navy), was burned off Spain.

=== 23 March ===
List of shipwrecks: 23 March 1778
Ship	State	Description
Reed	Great Britain	The schooner ran ashore at Cape Henlopen and was wrecked, her crew surrendered. Her sails, rigging, part of her cargo (sugar), and 8 carriage and 4 swivel guns were salvaged by the Americans.

=== 24 March ===
List of shipwrecks: 24 March 1778
Ship	State	Description
Unnamed	United States	The galley was burned in the harbor at Stamford, Connecticut, by a British landing party.

=== 27 March ===
List of shipwrecks: 27 March 1778
Ship	State	Description
USS Columbus	(United States) Continental Navy	American Revolutionary War: The frigate ran aground at Point Judith, Rhode Island, whilst under pursuit and was abandoned. She was subsequently burnt by the British.

=== 28 March ===
List of shipwrecks: 28 March 1778
Ship	State	Description
Heart of Oak	United States	The sloop was wrecked and broke up at Figueroa, Portugal. part of her cargo was saved.

=== 29 March ===
List of shipwrecks: 29 March 1778
Ship	State	Description
Active	Great Britain	The ship, a Letter of Marque, was lost near "The Start". Three crewmen drowned.

=== 30 March ===
List of shipwrecks: 30 March 1778
Ship	State	Description
Brilliant	Great Britain	American Revolutionary War:The transport sloop was sunk when forced into marine Chevaux-de-Frise by another ship while going up the Delaware River just below Fort Mifflin, 6 miles south of Philadelphia. Her crew and all the Hessian Mercenaries on board were rescued.

=== 31 March ===
List of shipwrecks: 31 March 1778
Ship	State	Description
USS Virginia	(United States) Continental Navy	American Revolutionary War:The 32 gun frigate ran aground on Middle Ground, Chesapeake Bay and was captured. Refloated, repaired and put in service as HMS Virginia ( (Kingdom of Great Britain) Royal Navy).

=== Unknown date ===
List of shipwrecks: Unknown date in March 1778
Ship	State	Description
Dolphin	(Kingdom of Great Britain) Royal Navy	The sloop, captured 218 miles off Sandy Hook by HMS Experiment ( (Kingdom of Great Britain) Royal Navy), was wrecked on Long Island in a snowstorm between 1 and 7 March. Prize crew was saved.
Royal George	Great Britain	The transport foundered near Sao Miguel Island, The Azores about the beginning of the month. crew rescued.
Sturdy Beggar	Maryland Naval Militia	The sloop was wrecked sometime in March.
Unnamed	(Kingdom of Great Britain) Royal Navy	A tender of HMS Enterprize ( (Kingdom of Great Britain) Royal Navy), captured on 20 March by USS Revenge (United States Navy), was burned off Spain.

== April ==
=== 5 April ===
List of shipwrecks: 5 April 1778
Ship	State	Description
Unnamed	United States	American Revolution:The sloop was burned by a landing party on the Shark River.

=== 6 April ===
List of shipwrecks: 6 April 1778
Ship	State	Description
Unnamed	Great Britain	American Revolution:The stripped sloop was burned by boats from galley Spitfire (Rhode Island Navy) at Bristol Ferry, Rhode Island.

=== 9 April ===
List of shipwrecks: 9 April 1778
Ship	State	Description
Two Friends	(Kingdom of Great Britain) Royal Navy	The French sloop, captured by frigate HMS Glasgow ( (Kingdom of Great Britain) Royal Navy) on the 8th, sprang a leak just after Midnight and sank off Cuba. The Prize Crew was rescued.

=== 12 April ===
List of shipwrecks: 12 April 1778
Ship	State	Description
Unnamed	United States	American Revolution:The schooner was captured on the 11th by frigate HMS Apollo ( (Kingdom of Great Britain) Royal Navy). She was stripped and burned on the 12th 30 Leagues north east of Nantucket.
Unnamed	United States	A Tender of frigate HMS Roebuck ran ashore in the early hours, at Cape Henlopen and was burned to prevent capture in the morning, her 21 crew were captured. 8 carriage and 4 swivel guns were salvaged by the Americans.

=== 13 April ===
List of shipwrecks: 13 April 1778
Ship	State	Description
Unnamed	Kingdom of France	American Revolution:The French polacca ran aground on Willoby's Shoal while being pursued by frigate HMS St. Albans ( (Kingdom of Great Britain) Royal Navy) and was captured, apparently pulled off.

=== 14 April ===
List of shipwrecks: 14 April 1778
Ship	State	Description
Dolphin	Great Britain	American Revolutionary War: The brigantine was captured by USS Ranger (United States Navy) between the Scilly Isles and Cape Clear Island and was scuttled.
Unnamed	Great Britain	American Revolutionary War: The schooner was captured by USS Ranger (United States Navy) and was scuttled.

=== 19 April ===
List of shipwrecks: 19 April 1778
Ship	State	Description
HMS Hinchenbrook	(Kingdom of Great Britain) Royal Navy	American Revolution:Frederica naval action:The armed brig or brigantine ran aground in the Frederica River during a battle with Washington, Lee, and Bullock all ( (United States) Georgia State Navy) and was captured.
HMS Rebecca	(Kingdom of Great Britain) Royal Navy	American Revolution:Frederica naval action:The armed sloop ran aground in the Frederica River during a battle with Washington, Lee, and Bullock all ( (United States) Georgia State Navy) and was captured.
Unnamed	(Kingdom of Great Britain) Royal Navy	American Revolution:Frederica naval action:The watering brig ran aground in the Frederica River during a battle with Washington, Lee, and Bullock all ( (United States) Georgia State Navy) and was captured.
Unnamed	Great Britain	American Revolutionary War: The coastal schooner was sunk by USS Ranger (United States Navy) in the Mull of Galloway.

=== 20 April ===
List of shipwrecks: 20 April 1778
Ship	State	Description
Unnamed	Flag unknown	American Revolutionary War: The sloop was captured by USS Ranger (United States Navy) and was scuttled.

=== 24 April ===
List of shipwrecks: 24 April 1778
Ship	State	Description
Duc de Choiseul	Kingdom of France	American Revolution: The ship ran aground and was wrecked in Liverpool Bay, Nova Scotia, during a battle with frigate HMS Blonde ( (Kingdom of Great Britain) Royal Navy). The wreck was stripped by the British. During the operation she rolled on her side killing 3 Royal Navy sailors. Probably broke up in the winter of 1778–1779.
USS Independence	(United States) Continental Navy	The sloop was wrecked in the Oracoke Inlet, North Carolina. Wreck extensively salvaged including her guns, cargo and ship's bell.

=== 27 April ===
List of shipwrecks: 27 April 1778
Ship	State	Description
Three unnamed vessels	Flags unknown	American Revolution: Three ships were burned by a boarding party from USS Ranger at Whitehaven, England.

=== 30 April ===
List of shipwrecks: 30 April 1778
Ship	State	Description
Unnamed	(Kingdom of Great Britain) Royal Navy	The tender was fired upon by USS Providence during Providence's escape from Providence, Rhode Island, and heavily damaged. She was sent to Newport, Rhode Island, where she sank at dock.

=== Unknown dagte ===
List of shipwrecks: Unknown date in April 1778
Ship	State	Description
Unnamed	(Kingdom of Great Britain) Royal Navy	The captured American vessel was wrecked 7 miles from Wilmington, North Carolina, before 20 April.

== May ==
=== 1 May ===
List of shipwrecks: 1 May 1778
Ship	State	Description
Unnamed	Flag unknown	The sloop stranded on Cape Henlopen.

=== 5 May ===
List of shipwrecks: 5 May 1778
Ship	State	Description
Unnamed	United States	The schooner was stranded on shore in Buzzard's Bay while being chased by a tender of HMS Unicorn and was burned by the British.

=== 6 May ===
List of shipwrecks: 6 May 1778
Ship	State	Description
Unnamed	United States	The ship was captured and was burned by the British near Falmouth, Massachusetts.

=== 8 May ===
List of shipwrecks: 8 May 1778
Ship	State	Description
USS Effingham	(United States) Continental Navy	American Revolutionary War: Delaware River Raid: The incomplete frigate, refloated, or partly above water, was burned by a British raiding party. She had been scuttled at White Hill near Bordentown, New Jersey, in 1777 to prevent capture by the British.
USS Washington	(United States) Continental Navy	American Revolutionary War: Delaware River Raid:The incomplete frigate, refloated, or partly above water, was burned by a British raiding party. She had been scuttled at White Hill near Bordentown, New Jersey, in 1777 to prevent capture by the British.
Sturdy Beggar	United States	American Revolutionary War: Delaware River Raid: The privateer was burned in Crosswicks Creek, New Jersey, by the British.
Unnamed	(United States) Continental Navy	American Revolutionary War: Delaware River Raid: Two new large ships, one pierced for 18 guns, was burned at Bordentown, New Jersey, by the British.
Unnamed	(United States)	American Revolutionary War: Delaware River Raid: The privateer sloop, 10 guns, was burned at Bordentown, New Jersey, by the British.
Unnamed	United States	American Revolutionary War: Delaware River Raid: The brig was burned at White Hill near Bordentown, New Jersey, by the British.
Unnamed	United States	American Revolutionary War: Delaware River Raid: The sloop was burned at White Hill near Bordentown, New Jersey, by the British.
Unnamed	United States	American Revolutionary War: Delaware River Raid:Ten ships (brigs, sloops and schooners) were burned at Bordentown, New Jersey, by the British.
Unnamed	United States	American Revolutionary War: Delaware River Raid:Eight ships (brigs, sloops and schooners) were burned in Crosswicks Creek, New Jersey, by the British.

=== 9 May ===
List of shipwrecks: 9 May 1778
Ship	State	Description
Kitty	United Kingdom	American Revolutionary War:The transport was captured in the Delaware River by Continental Navy armed boats and burned.
Mermaid	Great Britain	American Revolution:The transport was captured in the Delaware River by Continental Navy armed boats and burned.
Unnamed	United States	American Revolutionary War: Delaware River Raid: Six ships, a new schooner, an old schooner, a new sloop, a large old sloop, and 2 new ships were burned in Biles Island Creek, New Jersey by the British.
Unnamed	United States Continental Navy	American Revolutionary War: Delaware River Raid: An unknown number of galleys were found by the British scuttled in Watson Creek in deep water.
Unnamed	United States	American Revolutionary War: Delaware River Raid: Two sloops, a ship, a brig, 4 new ships, one new brig and one old schooner were burned at Bristol, Pennsylvania.
Unnamed	United States	American Revolutionary War: Delaware River Raid: Two sloops were burned at Bristol Ferry, Pennsylvania.

=== 10 May ===
List of shipwrecks: 10 May 1778
Ship	State	Description
Unnamed	United States	American Revolutionary War:The British burn several ships in the Delaware River(May be wrong date, may be about those burned on the 8-9th).

=== 11 May ===
List of shipwrecks: 11 May 1778
Ship	State	Description
Unnamed	United States	American Revolutionary War: The privateer sloop was driven ashore by British privateer "Tryon" (Great Britain) near Cape Hatteras.

=== 12 May ===
List of shipwrecks: 12 May 1778
Ship	State	Description
Le Gaston	Kingdom of France	American Revolutionary War: The polaque was run aground, scuttled, and abandoned near Cape Hatteras during a pursuit by HMS Ariel ( (Kingdom of Great Britain) Royal Navy). Ariel salvaged part of her cargo and burned the ship.

=== 13 May ===
List of shipwrecks: 13 May 1778
Ship	State	Description
Trader's Increase	United States	American Revolutionary War: The schooner was run aground near Cape Hatteras during a pursuit by HMS Ariel ( (Kingdom of Great Britain) Royal Navy). Ariel burned the ship on the 14th.
Unnamed	United States	American Revolutionary War: The schooner was run aground near Cape Hatteras during a pursuit by HMS Ariel ( (Kingdom of Great Britain) Royal Navy). Ariel burned the ship.

=== 14 May ===
List of shipwrecks: 14 May 1778
Ship	State	Description
Two Friends	United States	American Revolutionary War: The schooner was run aground near Cape Hatteras during a pursuit by HMS Ariel ( (Kingdom of Great Britain) Royal Navy) and captured. The ship was refloated on the 15th.

=== 18 May ===
List of shipwrecks: 18 May 1778
Ship	State	Description
General Montgomery	United States	American Revolutionary War: The privateer sloop was run aground in the harbor at Owl's Head, Nova Scotia during a pursuit by HMS Cabot ( (Kingdom of Great Britain) Royal Navy) and captured. The ship was refloated on the 19th.

=== 19 May ===
List of shipwrecks: 19 May 1778
Ship	State	Description
St. Jean	Kingdom of France	American Revolutionary War: The anchored snow was scuttled near Cape Hatteras 4 or 5 miles from Roanoke Inlet when approached by HMS Ariel ( (Kingdom of Great Britain) Royal Navy). HMS Ariel burned the ship.

=== 24 May ===
List of shipwrecks: 24 May 1778
Ship	State	Description
Bunker Hill	Massachusetts	American Revolutionary War: The privateer was captured by HMS Hope (Royal Navy) and burned off Whitehaven Harbour, Nova Scotia. Crew made POWs.
Fly	United States	American Revolutionary War: The schooner was captured off Cape Cod by HMS Raisonnable and HMS Diamond, (both (Kingdom of Great Britain) Royal Navy) and was burned.

=== 25 May ===
List of shipwrecks: 25 May 1778
Ship	State	Description
Unnamed	United States	American Revolutionary War: Mount Hope Bay raids: 125 batteaux were captured and burned by British troops.
Unnamed	United States	American Revolutionary War: Mount Hope Bay raids: An armed galley was captured and burned by British troops.
Unnamed	United States	American Revolutionary War: Mount Hope Bay raids: A sloop was captured and burned by British troops.

=== 26 May ===
List of shipwrecks: 26 May 1778
Ship	State	Description
Unnamed	United States	American Revolutionary War: The brig was captured and burned by HMS Cabot ( (Kingdom of Great Britain) Royal Navy) in the Gut of Canso, Nova Scotia.

=== 29 May ===
List of shipwrecks: 29 May 1778
Ship	State	Description
USS Norfolk Revenge	United States Navy Virginia Navy	American Revolutionary War: The galley was sunk in the Nansemond River.

=== 30 May ===
List of shipwrecks: 30 May 1778
Ship	State	Description
Angelica	United States	American Revolutionary War: The brig, a privateer, was captured by frigate HMS Andromeda ( (Kingdom of Great Britain) Royal Navy) and burned at sea.

=== 31 May ===
List of shipwrecks: 31 May 1778
Ship	State	Description
HMS Pigot	(Kingdom of Great Britain) Royal Navy	American Revolutionary War: Mount Hope Bay raids: The galley ran aground at Bristol Ferry, Rhode Island. She was kedged off some hours later despite being shelled by a battery nearby.
Unnamed	Flag unknown	American Revolutionary War: The sloop was run aground near Currituck, North Carolina, during a pursuit by HMS Ariel ( (Kingdom of Great Britain) Royal Navy). Left on the beach unboarded because of bad weather.
Unnamed	Great Britain	American Revolution: The unmanned, stripped, demasted, and holed brig came ashore between two rocks at Abbotsham Cliffs near Biddeford, Devonshire, England, sometime in May. It is believed to have been captured by American privateers who intended to scuttle her. She was refloated and taken to Biddeford on the 21st.

=== Unknown date ===
List of shipwrecks: unknown date in May 1778
Ship	State	Description
Elizabeth	United States	American Revolutionary War: The sloop was captured and destroyed by British privateer "Hammond" (Great Britain) prior to 25 May.
Esther	United States	American Revolutionary War: The schooner was captured and destroyed by British privateer Hammond (Great Britain) prior to 25 May.
Fish-Hawk	United States	American Revolutionary War: The schooner was captured and destroyed by British privateer Hammond (Great Britain) prior to 25 May.
Hawke	Great Britain	The sloop was stranded on Cape Henlopen on 1 or 2 May.
Jenny	United States	American Revolutionary War: The brig was captured and burned at "Carolina" by British privateer Hammond (Great Britain) prior to 25 May.
Jenny	United States	American Revolutionary War: The sloop was captured and destroyed by British privateer Hammond (Great Britain) prior to 25 May.
Lilly	United States	American Revolutionary War: The sloop was captured and destroyed by British privateer Hammond (Great Britain) prior to 25 May.
Nancy	United States	American Revolutionary War: The schooner was captured and destroyed by British privateer Hammond (Great Britain) prior to 25 May.
Nelly	United States	American Revolutionary War: The sloop was captured and destroyed by British privateer Hammond (Great Britain) prior to 25 May.
Polly	United States	American Revolutionary War: The schooner was captured and destroyed by British privateer Hammond (Great Britain) prior to 25 May.
Robert	United States	American Revolutionary War: The sloop was captured and destroyed by British privateer Hammond (Great Britain) prior to 25 May.
Sally	United States	American Revolutionary War: The brig, a prize ship, was recaptured by a British privateer at Topsail Inlet before 15 May and burned when she couldn't be taken out. Her cargo of salt was salvaged by the Americans, but the ship was "ruined".
Spit-Fire	United States	American Revolutionary War: The boat was captured and destroyed by British privateer Hammond (Great Britain) prior to 25 May.
Success	United States	American Revolutionary War: The sloop was captured and destroyed by British privateer Hammond (Great Britain) prior to 25 May.
True Blue	Great Britain	The slave ship was lost off Cameroon before 15 May. crew and 60 slaves were saved by Ann (Great Britain).
Two unnamed vessels	Great Britain	Two coal ships out of a convoy of five burned and sank from spontaneous combustion before 15 May.
Unnamed	Great Britain	The schooner was captured by privateers at LaHave, Nova Scotia, she was stripped and burned. Probably on the 27th, but possibly on the 20th.
Unnamed	Flag unknown	The schooner was stranded on Cape Henlopen on or before 7–8 May.
Unnamed	United States	American Revolutionary War: Six ships were driven ashore by British privateer George and Elizabeth (Great Britain}) during a cruise, apparently on various dates before 12 May.

== June ==
=== 6 June ===
List of shipwrecks: 6 June 1778
Ship	State	Description
Unknown	United States	American Revolutionary War: The brig was captured and burned by HMS Niger (Royal Navy).

=== 9 June ===
List of shipwrecks: 9 June 1778
Ship	State	Description
Unknown	United States	American Revolutionary War: The sloop was captured and burned by armed sloop "Harriot" (United Kingdom) in Carratuck Inlet, North Carolina.

=== 12 June ===
List of shipwrecks: 12 June 1778
Ship	State	Description
Amity	United States	American Revolutionary War: The schooner was captured and burned by HMS Experiment (Royal Navy) off Monhegan Island, Massachusetts.

=== 13 June ===
List of shipwrecks: 13 June 1778
Ship	State	Description
Fox	United States	The privateer was driven ashore at Port Medway, Nova Scotia, trying to escape from the sloops General Gage, and General Howe (both Great Britain), and another Large Armed Sloop. captured and refloated.
unknown	United Kingdom	American Revolutionary War: The sloop was captured and burned in the Delaware River off Holmans Creek.

=== 19 June ===
List of shipwrecks: 19 June 1778
Ship	State	Description
Catherine	Royal Navy	The hired armed sloop struck a submerged log in the Mississippi River and sank.

== July ==
=== 6 July ===
List of shipwrecks: 6 July 1778
Ship	State	Description
Albion	United Kingdom	American Revolutionary War: The ship sank after striking marine Cheval de frise in the Delaware River.

=== 8 July ===
List of shipwrecks: 8 July 1778
Ship	State	Description
HMS Mermaid	(Kingdom of Great Britain) Royal Navy	The Mermaid-class frigate was driven ashore to prevent her being captured by French frigates. surrendered to an American vessel.

=== 31 July ===
List of shipwrecks: 31 July 1778
Ship	State	Description
Unnamed	Great Britain	American Revolutionary War:The ship ran aground at Shrewsbury, New Jersey. Stripped by Militia despite shelling by a Royal Navy frigate.

== August ==
=== 1 August ===
List of shipwrecks: 1 August 1778
Ship	State	Description
Unnamed	Great Britain	American Revolutionary War:The Row galley was run aground at Shrewsbury, New Jersey, by American vessels.

=== 5 August ===
List of shipwrecks: 5 August 1778
Ship	State	Description
HMS Cerberus	(Kingdom of Great Britain) Royal Navy	American Revolutionary War: The 28 gun Coventry-class sixth rate frigate was run aground, set afire and was destroyed in Narragansett Bay to avoid capture by French ships of the line.
HMS Juno	(Kingdom of Great Britain) Royal Navy	American Revolutionary War: The 32 gun Richmond-class frigate was run aground, set afire and was destroyed in Narragansett Bay to avoid capture by French ships of the line.
HMS Lark	(Kingdom of Great Britain) Royal Navy	American Revolutionary War: The 32 gun Richmond-class frigate was run aground, set afire and was destroyed when her powder magazine exploded in Narragansett Bay to avoid capture by French ships of the line.
HMS Orpheus	(Kingdom of Great Britain) Royal Navy	American Revolutionary War: The 32 gun Lowestoffe-class fifth-rate frigate was run aground, set afire and was destroyed in Narragansett Bay to avoid capture by French ships of the line.

=== 6 August ===
List of shipwrecks: 6 August 1778
Ship	State	Description
Charlotte	United States	American Revolutionary War: The schooner ran aground in Bull Island Bay, South Carolina, whilst being chased by the privateer Revenge (Great Britain). She was consequently captured by the British.
Love and Unity	United States	American Revolutionary War:The ship ran aground off Tom's River, New Jersey.

=== 20 August ===
List of shipwrecks: 20 August 1778
Ship	State	Description
Glory of America	United States	American Revolutionary War:The ship was sunk off Egg Harbor, New Jersey, by Tryon.

=== 21 August ===
List of shipwrecks: 21 August 1778
Ship	State	Description
Unnamed	(Kingdom of Great Britain) Royal Navy (?)	American Revolutionary War:The cruizer went ashore at Cape May while trying to avoid capture by the French.

=== 24 August ===
List of shipwrecks: 24 August 1778
Ship	State	Description
Colebrooke	British East India Company	The East Indiaman struck Anvil Rock, in Kogel Bay and was wrecked with the loss of seven of her crew. She was on a voyage from Madeira to Bombay, India.

=== Unknown date ===
List of shipwrecks: Unknown date in August 1778
Ship	State	Description
Lord Sandwich	Great Britain	American Revolutionary War: The prison ship, a barque, was scuttled at Newport, Rhode Island, United States between 3 and 6 August.

== September ==
=== 5 September ===
List of shipwrecks: 5 September 1778
Ship	State	Description
Unnamed	Great Britain	American Revolutionary War:The ship was captured and destroyed.

=== 25 September ===
List of shipwrecks: 25 September 1778
Ship	State	Description
USS Raleigh	United States Navy	The Hancock-class frigate ran aground on Wooden Ball Island, Maine, whilst in an engagement with HMS Experiment and HMS Unicorn (both (Kingdom of Great Britain) Royal Navy) and was abandoned. She was captured by the British, refloated on 28 September and taken into service as HMS Raleigh.

== October ==
=== 3 October ===
List of shipwrecks: 3 October 1778
Ship	State	Description
HMS Mary	(Kingdom of Great Britain) Royal Navy	The 4-gun smack was lost in Plymouth Sound.

=== 6 October ===
List of shipwrecks: 6 October 1778
Ship	State	Description
HMS Greenwich	(Kingdom of Great Britain) Royal Navy	American Revolutionary War: The Egg Harbor Expedition: The Swan-class ship sloop became grounded near Osborne Island, or on Mincock Island, near Little Egg Harbor, New Jersey, United States. Refloated on the 8th, and regrounded, then refloated.
HMS Granby	(Kingdom of Great Britain) Royal Navy	American Revolutionary War: The Egg Harbor Expedition: The armed sloop became grounded near Osborne Island, or on Mincock Island near Little Egg Harbor, New Jersey, United States. Refloated on the 8th.
Venus	United States	American Revolution: The Egg Harbor Expedition: The ship had been captured by American privateers and scuttled/dismantled in Little Egg Harbor, New Jersey, United States to prevent recapture, was recaptured and burned.
Unnamed	United States	American Revolution: The Egg Harbor Expedition: Nine ships that had been captured by American privateers and scuttled/dismantled in Little Egg Harbor, New Jersey, United States to prevent recapture, were recaptured and burned. Some ships burned until Noon on the 7th.

=== 9 October ===
List of shipwrecks: 9 October 1778
Ship	State	Description
Mary	Great Britain	The ship was wrecked at Pensacola, Florida, British America.
Sarah and Elizabeth	Great Britain	The ship was wrecked at Pensacola.

=== 20 October ===
List of shipwrecks: 20 October 1778
Ship	State	Description
Solovey (Соловей, 'Nightingale')	Imperial Russian Navy	The ship was driven ashore by ice and wrecked near the mouth of the Volga. Her crew were rescued. She was on a voyage from Bandar-e Anzali, Gilan to the Volga.

=== 22 October ===
List of shipwrecks: 22 October 1778
Ship	State	Description
HMS Zebra	(Kingdom of Great Britain) Royal Navy	American Revolutionary War: The Egg Harbor Expedition: The Swan-class ship sloop ran aground in Little Egg Harbor, New Jersey, United States. She was blown up to avoid her being captured.

=== Unknown date ===
List of shipwrecks: Unknown date in October 1778
Ship	State	Description
Dispatch	Great Britain	The ship departed from Newfoundland, British America. No further trace, presumed foundered with the loss of all hands.

== November ==
=== 2 November ===
List of shipwrecks: 2 November 1778
Ship	State	Description
HMS Somerset	(Kingdom of Great Britain) Royal Navy	The 64-gun third rate ship of the line was wrecked on Peaked Hill Bar, a sandbar off Cape Cod, Massachusetts, United States with the loss of between 21 and 70 of her crew, according to different sources. Her wreckage was buried on the beach at Dead Man's Hollow, near Provincetown, Massachusetts.

=== 11 November ===
List of shipwrecks: 11 November 1778
Ship	State	Description
Akhtapom (Ахтапом)	Imperial Russian Navy	The transport ship was holed by ice and sank off the ru:Krivaya Spit in the Sea of Azov. Her crew survived. She was on a voyage from the ru:Petrovskaya Fortress to Taganrog. Another source gives the year as 1779.

=== 22 November ===
List of shipwrecks: 22 November 1778
Ship	State	Description
Rattlesnake	United States	American Revolutionary War:The 18 gun Privateer ran aground and was wrecked on Middle Ground, Chesapeake Bay while being pursued by HMS Swift ( (Kingdom of Great Britain) Royal Navy).
HMS Swift	(Kingdom of Great Britain) Royal Navy	American Revolutionary War:The 14 gun sloop ran aground on Middle Ground, Chesapeake Bay while pursuing Privateer "Rattlesnake" (United States). Burned to prevent captrure.

== December ==
=== 1 December ===
List of shipwrecks: 1 December 1778
Ship	State	Description
Martha	Great Britain	The ship was driven ashore and wrecked 15 leagues (45 nautical miles (83 km) north of Egg Harbor, New Jersey, United States. She was on a voyage from Halifax, Nova Scotia, British America to New York, United States

=== 9 December ===
List of shipwrecks: 19 December 1778
Ship	State	Description
Unnamed	Great Britain	American Revolutionary War:The armed vessel ran aground near Barnegat, New Jersey. Crew captured by Militia.

=== 26 December ===
List of shipwrecks: 26 December 1778
Ship	State	Description
General Arnold	United States	The privateer, a brig, was wrecked at Plymouth Harbor, Massachusetts, with the loss of 70 of her 105 crew.

=== 28 December ===
List of shipwrecks: 28 December 1778
Ship	State	Description
London	British East India Company	The East Indiaman was run down and sunk off Berry Head, Devon by HMS Russell ( (Kingdom of Great Britain) Royal Navy).

=== 29 December ===
List of shipwrecks: 29 December 1778
Ship	State	Description
HMS Cupid	(Kingdom of Great Britain) Royal Navy	The Sloop-of-War foundered in the Grand Banks of Newfoundland with the loss of nine of her crew.

=== 31 December ===
List of shipwrecks: 31 December 1778
Ship	State	Description
Betsey	Great Britain	The transport ship foundered in the Nore.
Marianna Charlotta	Kingdom of Sicily	The ship was driven ashore and wrecked on the Mull of Galloway, Great Britain. She was on a voyage from the Isle of Man to Naples.
Ruby	Great Britain	The ship was wrecked at Jersey, Channel Islands.

=== Unknown date ===
List of shipwrecks: Unknown date in December 1778
Ship	State	Description
Fame	Great Britain	The ship was wrecked on Sable Island, Nova Scotia, British America.
Jenny	Great Britain	The ship was driven ashore and wrecked on Staten Island, New York, United States. She was on a voyage from New York City to London.
Lady Catharina	Ireland	The ship was lost near Holyhead, Anglesey, Great Britain with the loss of all but one of her crew. She was on a voyage from Dublin to the West Indies.
Mary	Great Britain	American Revolutionary War: The ship was lost off Cape Florida, British America whilst evading two American privateers.
Nouvelle Abondance	France	The ship, a prize, foundered in the English Channel off Calais. Her crew were rescued.
Rose	United States	The ship was driven ashore and wrecked on Staten Island in late December.

== Unknown date ==
List of shipwrecks: Unknown date in 1778
Ship	State	Description
Harland	India	The schooner was wrecked.
Le Tonnerre	Kingdom of France	American Revolutionary War: The vessel was captured by HMS Senegal ( (Kingdom of Great Britain) Royal Navy) and destroyed between December, 1777 and March, 1778.
Minerva	United States	The ship was lost near "Westerley". She was on a voyage from Rhode Island to New York.
Neptune	Dutch Republic	The ship was lost at Tortola.
Rockingham	Great Britain	The transport ship was lost.
Unnamed	United States	American Revolutionary War: The privateer was sunk with all hands by Sally (Great Britain) sometime before 4 May.
