= French ship Fantasque (1758) =

Ship of the line of the French Navy

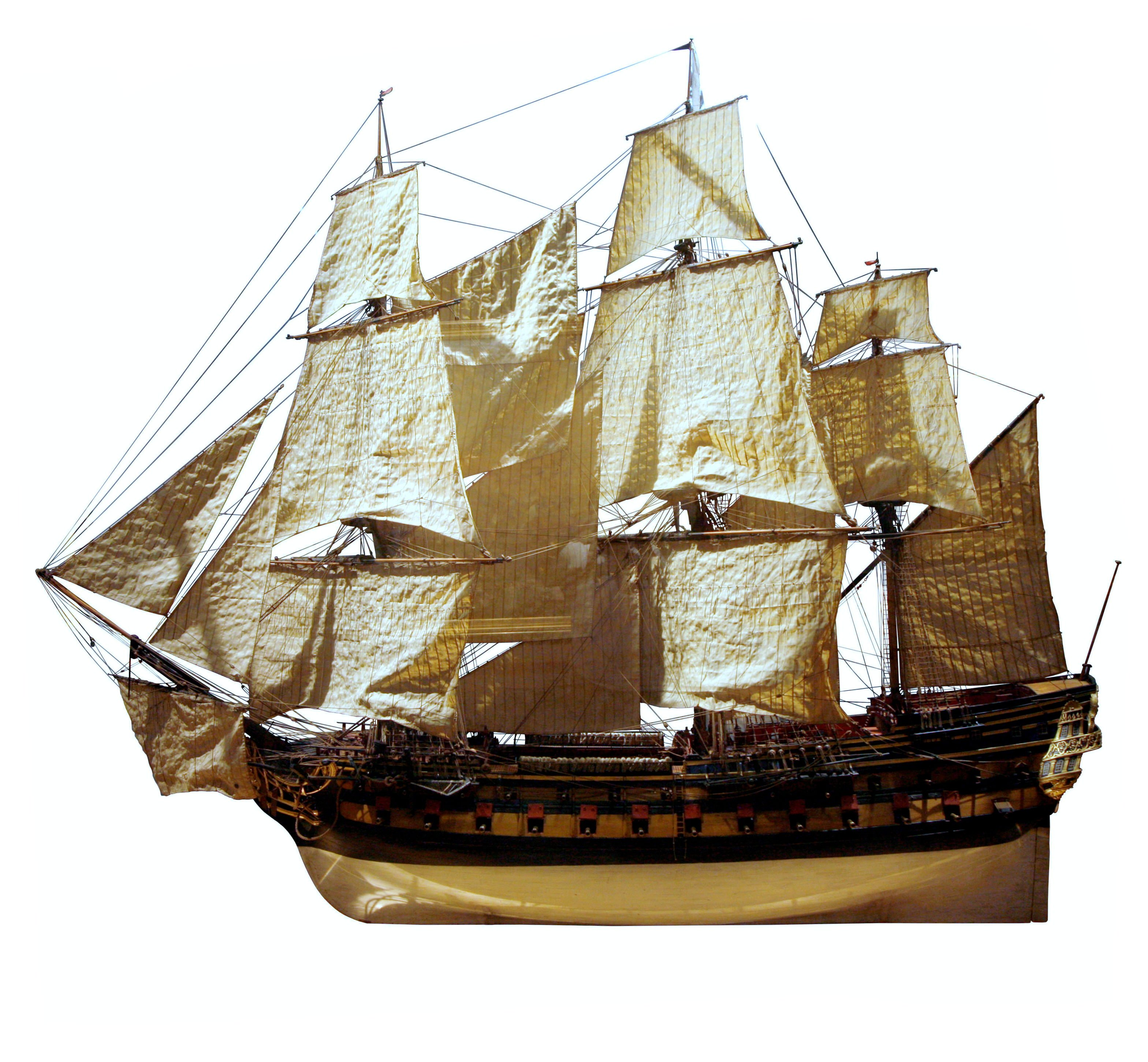
- Model of Protée, sister ship of Fantasque

History

France
- Name: Fantasque
- Builder: Joseph Véronique-Charles Chapelle, Toulon Dockyard
- Laid down: July 1757
- Launched: 10 May 1758
- In service: May 1759
- Fate: Hulked 1784

General characteristics
- Class & type: Lion-class ship of the line
- Displacement: 2084 tonneaux
- Tons burthen: 1100 port tonneaux
- Length: 151 French feet (Note: The French (pre-metric) foot - or pied - was about 6.575% longer than the British/American foot.)
- Beam: 40½ French feet
- Draught: 21½ French feet
- Depth of hold: 19½ French feet
- Complement: 480 in war, +9/12 officers
- Armament: 64 guns: lower deck 26 × 24-pounders (Note: The French (pre-metric) pound - or livre - was about 7.916% heavier than the British/American pound.); upper deck 28 × 12-pounders; quarterdeck 6 × 6-pounders; forecastle 4 × 6-pounders

Fantasque was a Lion-class 64-gun ship of the line of the French Navy. She is famous for being captained by the French commander Pierre-André de Suffren during the American Revolutionary War.

== Career ==
Fantasque was launched in May 1758 at Toulon. She was commissioned under Captain de Catillon in May 1759.

Fantasque was a member of Admiral Jean-François de La Clue-Sabran's fleet as it sailed from Toulon on 5 August 1759. Admiral La Clue and his captains were given orders only to be opened having passed through the Strait of Gibraltar. Once through the Strait, Admiral Edward Boscawen, ordered the British Mediterranean Fleet to sail in pursuit. Fantasque was the lead ship of the weaker column of La Clue's fleet and her captain chose to lead the column to the safety of the port at Cádiz, avoiding the closing British and the subsequent engagement, the Battle of Lagos.

In 1760 and 1761, she cruised in the Eastern Mediterranean in a squadron under Rochemore. The next year, she sailed with a squadron under Bompart.

In 1778, Fantasque was part of the squadron under Admiral d'Estaing supporting the rebels in the War of American Independence, under Captain Suffren. Suffren was leading a division, with his flag on Fantasque, which he personally captained, along with the frigates Aimable, Chimère and Engageante. The mission of his force was to support Franco-American efforts in the Battle of Rhode Island by striking a 5-frigate British squadron anchored in Narragansett Bay, off Newport, comprising HMS Juno, Flora, Lark, Orpheus and Cerebus. On 5 August 1778, Suffren entered the Bay and anchored next to the British, who cut their cables and scuttled their ships by fire to avoid capture. The Royal Navy ended up having to destroy ten of their own vessels in all, including five frigates. (Note: The remains of the Cerberus are now part of a site listed on the National Register of Historic Places, the "Wreck Sites of HMS Cerberus and HMS Lark.")

The French fleet sailed to Martinique, where Suffren's division joined up with it, and from there to Grenada, leading to the Battle of Grenada on 6 July 1779. Fantasque was at the front of the vanguard, under Suffren, preceding the 74-gun Zélé. When the two fleets came in contact, she came under fire from the 74-gun Royal Oak and the 70-gun Boyne, sustaining 62 men killed or wounded.

In September 1779, Saint-Antonin was given command of Fantasque. He captained her at the Siege of Savannah.

Fantasque was converted into a hospital ship in May 1780 for the movement of Rochambeau's troops from Brest to America, and was then converted into a transport. Now under Captain de Vaudoré, she was part of Des Touches's squadron engaged in action off the Chesapeake on 16 March 1781. She lasted in service until early 1784, when she was condemned at Lorient, but was then sent to Martinique to become a hulk in November 1784. however, she never reached Martinique; she foundered off the coast of Aquitaine with the loss of all 500 people on board.
