= Mrs Dubois =

London tavern-keeper

Mrs Dubois (fl. 1756) was a naval contractor and tavern-keeper in London in the mid-eighteenth century. She may have taken over business on the death of her husband. Several taverns in London at this time sold ‘portable soup’, a stiff jelly made by boiling down the liquor extracted from very slow-cooked cuts of beef or mutton. Placed in air-tight containers, this substance would keep for some time and could be reconstituted as soup or stock with the addition of boiling water.

The Royal Navy decided to include this food in their ships’ rations. Eventually the navy manufactured portable soup itself but initially, in 1756 the navy contracted with Mrs Dubois to supply portable soup to the navy in London and a Mr Cookworthy of Plymouth to supply the navy there and at Portsmouth. Mrs. Dubois is, erroneously, credited by some naval historians with inventing portable soup. Described as ‘a person of good character and circumstances’, she operated from a tavern, at the Golden Head, in Three Kings Court in Fleet Street. She may have been the widow of a French chef and tavern keeper but by 1757 she had a new husband, Edward Bennet, son of a Sheffield knife-grinder. The contract with the navy was alluded to in advertising material long after it had lapsed, Benjamin Piper, successor in the business announced he was ‘Successor to Messieurs Bennet and Dubois, The original Portable Soup-Makers to His majesty’s Royal Navy’ and one Vigor, successor to Piper, used the same rubric on his flyers.
