= Bouillon cube =

Dehydrated broth used to flavor soup and other dishes

Bouillon cubes
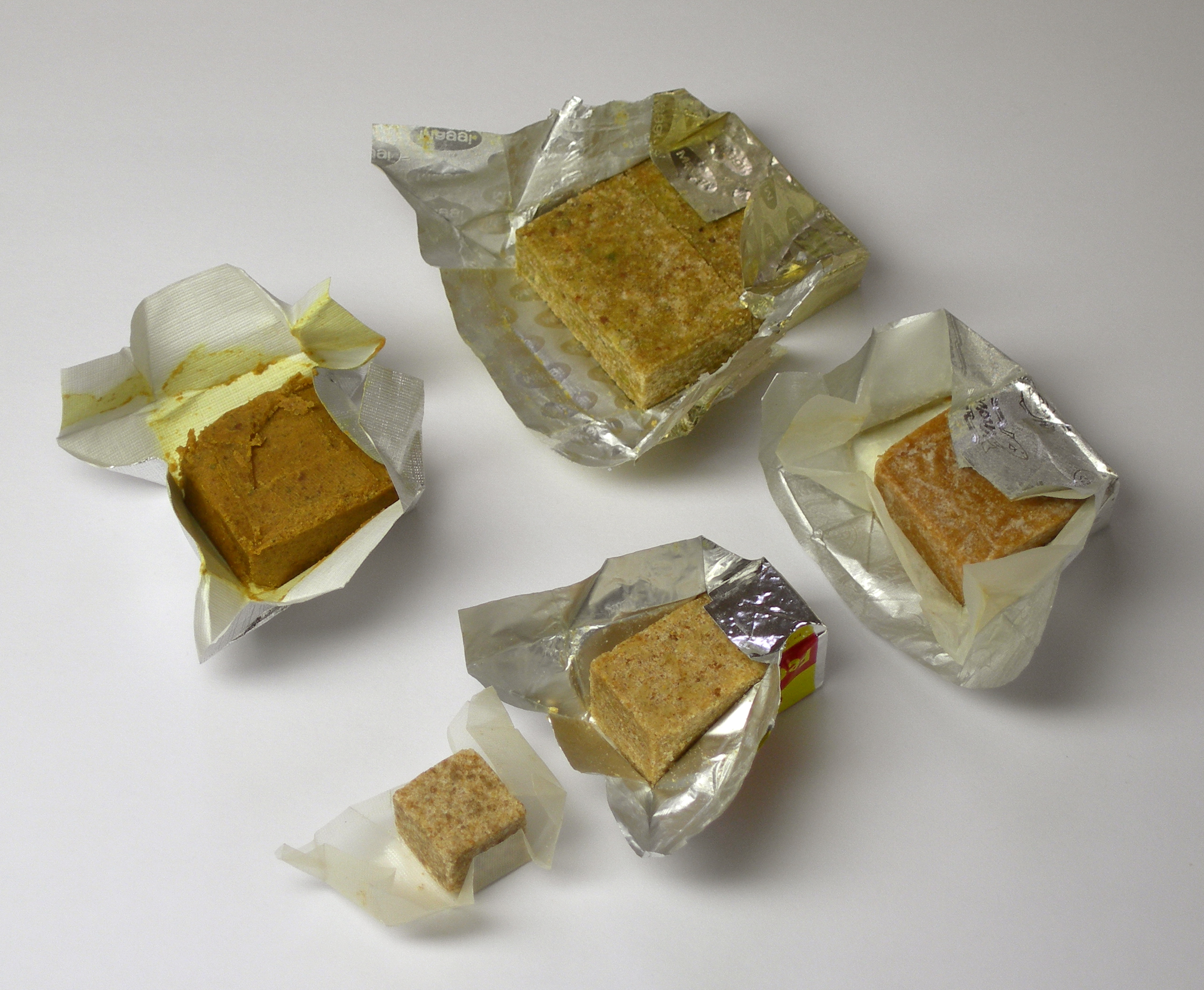
- Various bouillon cubes
- Place of origin: England and France
- Main ingredients: Dehydrated broth or stock, dehydrated vegetables, fat, MSG, salt, seasonings

A bouillon cube /ˈbuːjɒn/ (also known as a stock cube) is dehydrated broth or stock formed into a small cube or other cuboid shape. The most common format is a cube about 13 mm (1/2 in) wide. It is typically made from dehydrated vegetables or meat stock, a small portion of fat, MSG, salt, and seasonings, shaped into a small cube. Vegetarian and vegan types are also made. Instant bouillon is also available in granular, powdered, liquid, and paste forms.

== History ==
Dehydrated meat stock, in the form of tablets, was known in the 17th century to English food writer Anne Blencowe, who died in 1718, and elsewhere as early as 1735. Various French cooks in the early 19th century (Lefesse, Massué, and Martin) tried to patent bouillon cubes and tablets, but were turned down for lack of originality. Nicolas Appert also proposed such dehydrated bouillon in 1831.

Portable soup was a kind of dehydrated food used in the 18th and 19th centuries. It was a precursor of meat extract and bouillon cubes, and of industrially dehydrated food. It is also known as pocket soup or veal glue. It is a cousin of the glace de viande of French cooking. It was long a staple of seamen and explorers, for it would keep for many months or even years. In this context, it was a filling and nutritious dish. Portable soup of less extended vintage was, according to the 1881 Household Cyclopedia, "exceedingly convenient for private families, for by putting one of the cakes in a saucepan with about a quart of water, and a little salt, a basin of good broth may be made in a few minutes."

In the mid-19th century, German chemist Justus von Liebig developed meat extract, but it was more expensive than bouillon cubes. It is essentially only dehydrated meat stock.

Industrially produced bouillon cubes were commercialized by Maggi in 1908, by Oxo in 1910, and by Knorr in 1912. By 1913, at least 10 brands were available, with salt contents of 59–72%.

== Ingredients ==
The ingredients vary between manufacturers and may change from time to time.

- A lower-end product includes salt, hydrogenated fat, monosodium glutamate, flavor enhancers, and flavors. It is labelled as "beef flavor" without beef.
- A mid-end product typically combines cheaper sources of flavor with actual meat/bone/vegetable (usually first cooked into an extract) and/or animal fat. For example, Maggi bouillon cubes are manufactured from iodized salt, hydrogenated palm oil, wheat flour, flavor enhancers (monosodium glutamate, disodium inosinate, disodium guanylate), chicken fat, chicken meat, sugar, caramel, yeast extract, onion, spices (turmeric, white pepper, coriander), and parsley.
- A high-end product typically mainly rely on meat/bone/vegetable (usually extracted) for the meaty flavor and savoriness, such as described in a 2004 patent. As an example, "Better than Bouillion" is made from roasted chicken, salt, sugar, maltodextrin, chicken stock, yeast extract, onion powder, garlic powder, tumeric, and flavoring.

== Production process ==
Stock cubes are made by mixing already-dry ingredients into a paste, including salt, fat, (meat/bone/vegetable) extract, etc. The ingredients are usually mixed in a container (batch mixing), left to mature, and then shaped into the cube form. Alternatively, they can be mixed directly into an extruder. The "extract" portion needs to be separately produced from the meat, bone, or whatever food is intended to be used in the reconstituted boullion (see meat extract). This is achieved by large-scale cooking similar to what is used to make pre-packaged broth, followed by an evaporation process to condense the product.

== Other forms ==
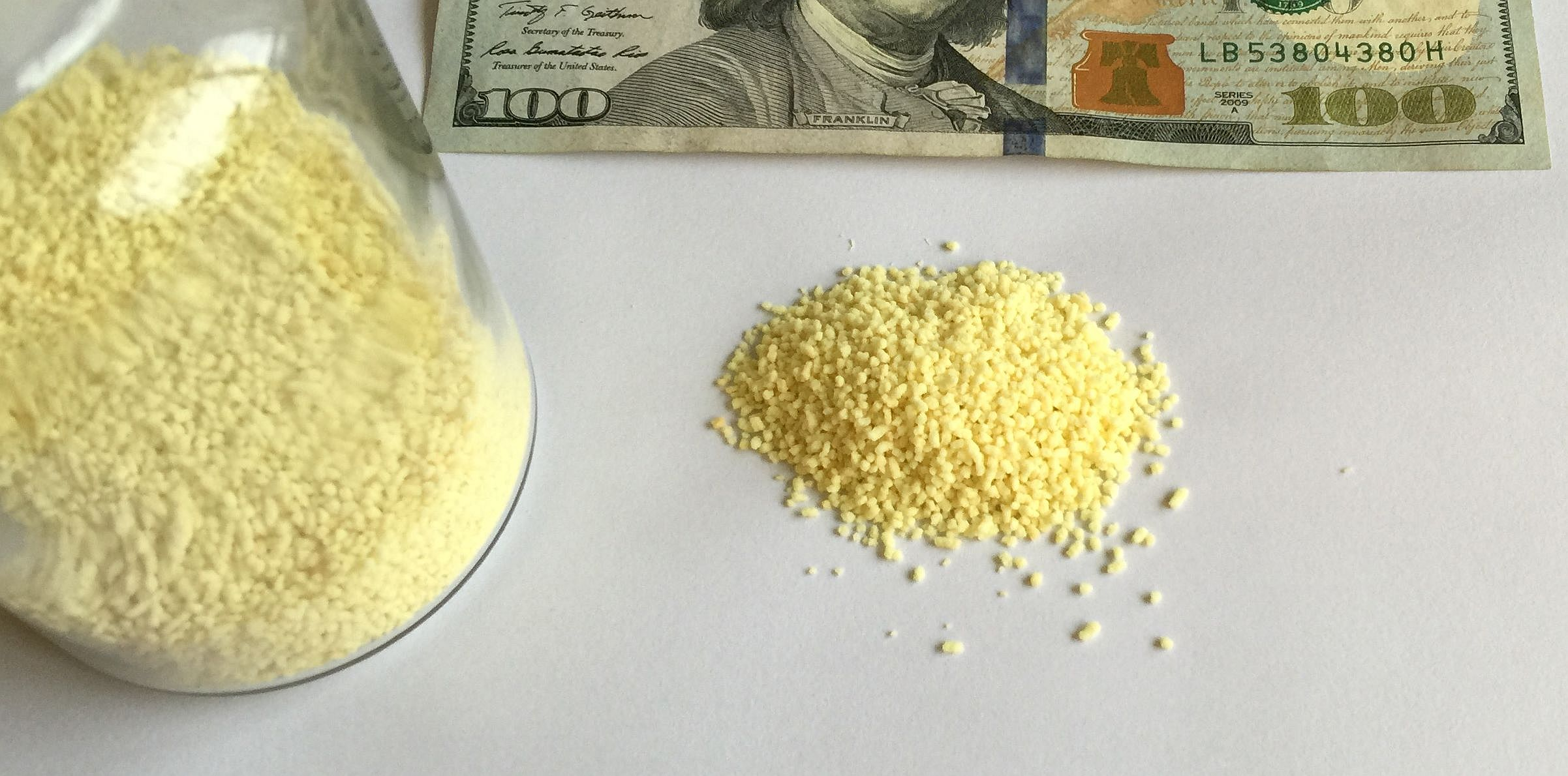
Granulated chicken stock, made from a similar set of ingredients with starch as a forming excipient

In Asian cooking, it is more customary to use a dehydrated stock in the form of granules or a powder, as a replacement for MSG powder. These products are made from a similar set of ingredients and chicken is the most common flavor. Like stock cubes, they are very high in sodium (though also intended to be used only as a condiment).

Instant bouillon are also made in liquid and paste forms. The paste form is similar to a bulk version of the cube. The liquid form contains more water.

== See also ==
- Instant dashi
- List of dried foods
