= Joseph-François-Félix Garnier de Saint-Antonin =

French Navy officer

Joseph-François-Félix Garnier de Saint-Antonin was a French Navy officer. He served in the War of American Independence, earning a membership in the Society of Cincinnati and the Order of Saint Louis.

== Biography ==
Saint-Antonin was born to a family from Aix-en-Provence. He joined the Navy as a Garde-Marine on 18 September 1749.

Saint-Antonin was promoted to Lieutenant on 15 January 1762, and to Captain on 4 April 1777. He was first officer on the 64-gun Provence. He took part in the Battle of Grenada on 6 July 1779, and took over command of Provence when her captain, Champorcin, was killed. He was then given command of the 64-gun Fantasque, which he captained at the Siege of Savannah.

In 1780, he commanded the frigate Lutine for a mission in the Eastern Mediterranean. In 1781, he was at Malta and Toulon.

He retired from the Navy on 29 August 1783.

== Sources and references ==
Notes

Bibliography

- Contenson, Ludovic (1934). La Société des Cincinnati de France et la guerre d'Amérique (1778-1783). Paris: éditions Auguste Picard. OCLC 7842336.
- Lacour-Gayet, Georges (1905). La marine militaire de la France sous le règne de Louis XVI. Paris: Honoré Champion. OCLC 763372623.

External links

- Archives nationales (2011). "Fonds Marine, sous-série B/4: Campagnes, 1571-1785" (PDF).
