= Frederica River =

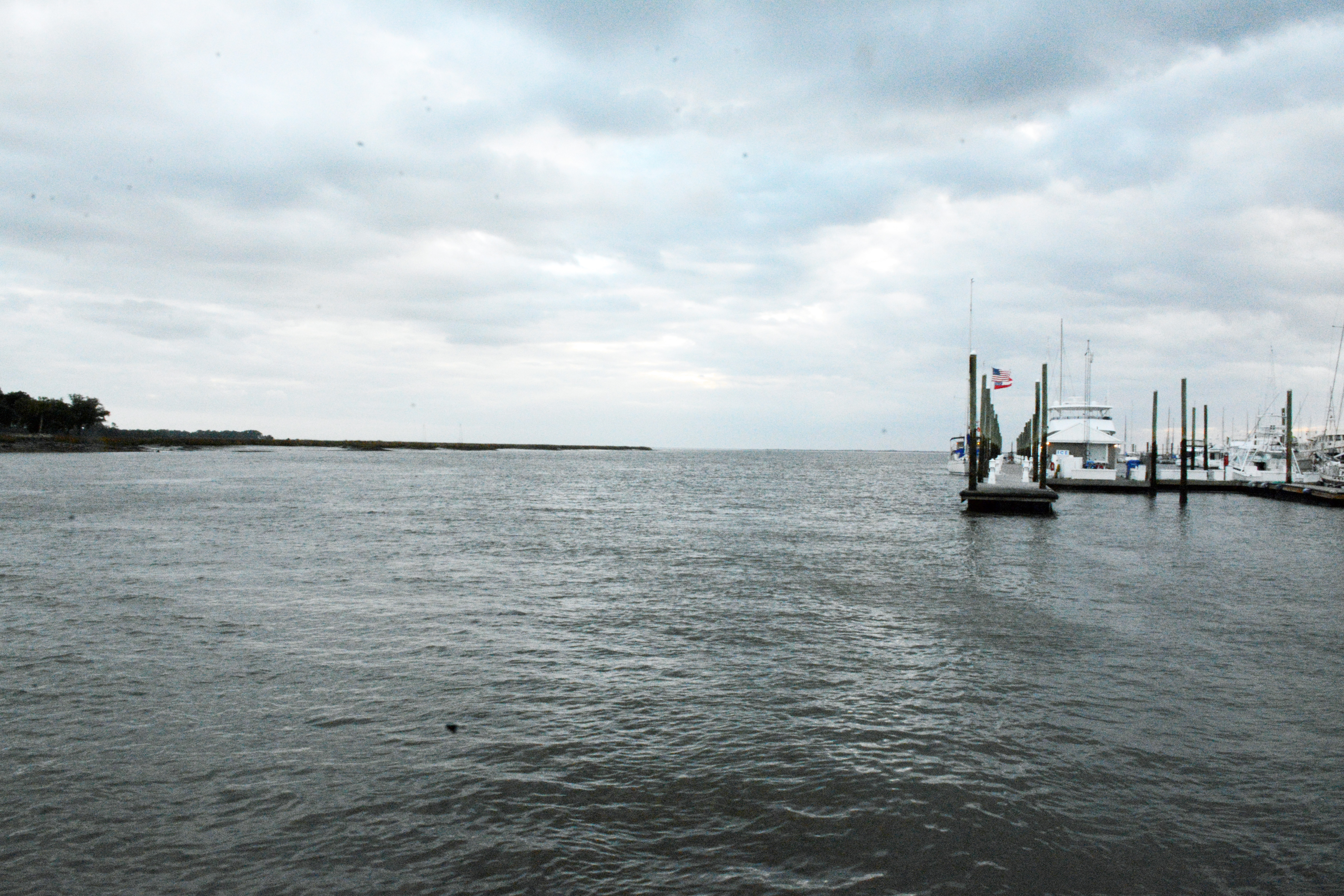
- Frederica River; St. Simons Island is to the left

- Location of mouth

Location
- Country: United States
- State: Georgia

Physical characteristics
- Source
  - location: Georgia
- Mouth
  - coordinates: 31°12′10″N 81°24′07″W

The Frederica River is an 11.0-mile-long (17.7 km) tidal river in Glynn County, Georgia. It forms the western boundary of Saint Simons Island of the Georgia Sea Islands. Fort Frederica National Monument is located on the eastern bank of the river on Saint Simons Island.

In 1779, three galleys of the recently formed Georgia State Navy captured a British raiding party.

== See also ==
- List of rivers of Georgia
