= Wreck Sites of HMS Cerberus and HMS Lark =

- U.S. National Register of Historic Places
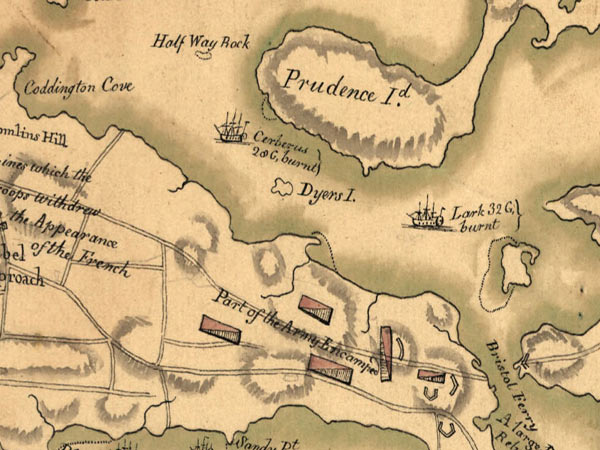
- A 1778 military map showing the wreck locations

- Location within Rhode Island Location within the United States
- Nearest city: South Portsmouth, Rhode Island
- Coordinates: 41°35′4″N 71°18′19″W
- Built: 1778
- NRHP reference No.: 73000061
- Added to NRHP: April 26, 1973

The Wreck Sites of HMS Cerberus and HMS Lark are located in the waters of Narragansett Bay on the west side of Aquidneck Island near South Portsmouth, Rhode Island.

== History ==
HMS Cerberus was a frigate of the Royal Navy built in 1758 and carrying 28 guns. HMS Lark, also a frigate, was built in 1762 and carried 32 guns. Cerberus had been stationed off Rhode Island as part of a blockade of its ports since April 1776 and was joined by Lark in February 1777. Upon the arrival of a large French fleet off Narragansett Bay in late July 1778, the two ships were among the twenty British vessels in the bay which were then tasked to defend British-occupied Newport. Stationed in the northern stretch of the East Passage (separating Aquidneck and Conanicut Islands), the two ships were ordered to Newport, with instructions to not surrender to the enemy. While en route to Newport on August 5, the two ships were sighted by French ships of the line. On 8, the 64-gun Fantasque and the frigates Aimable, Chimère and Engageante, under Pierre André de Suffren, entered the Bay. Rather than engage on a lopsided battle that would have ended in their surrender, the two captains decided to scuttle their ships. Captain Symonds ran Cerberus aground, put the crew ashore, and set fire to the ship, while Captain White did the same with Lark. Two other British frigates, Orpheus and Juno, suffered the same fate. When Lark's gunpowder magazine was reached by the flames, it exploded, sending debris flying for miles around.

The wrecks of all four ships lay essentially undisturbed until the 1970s, when an archaeological team located portions of Lark, Cerberus, and Orpheus. As of 2008, the full extent of the wreck sites has not been established, and only fragmentary evidence of the ships has been recovered.

The site of the wrecks of Cerberus and Lark was listed on the National Register of Historic Places in 1973.

== See also ==
- National Register of Historic Places listings in Newport County, Rhode Island

Other military sites associated with the 1778 French expedition to Newport:

- Battle of Rhode Island Site
- Conanicut Battery
- Fort Barton
