= Meat extract =

Highly concentrated meat stock

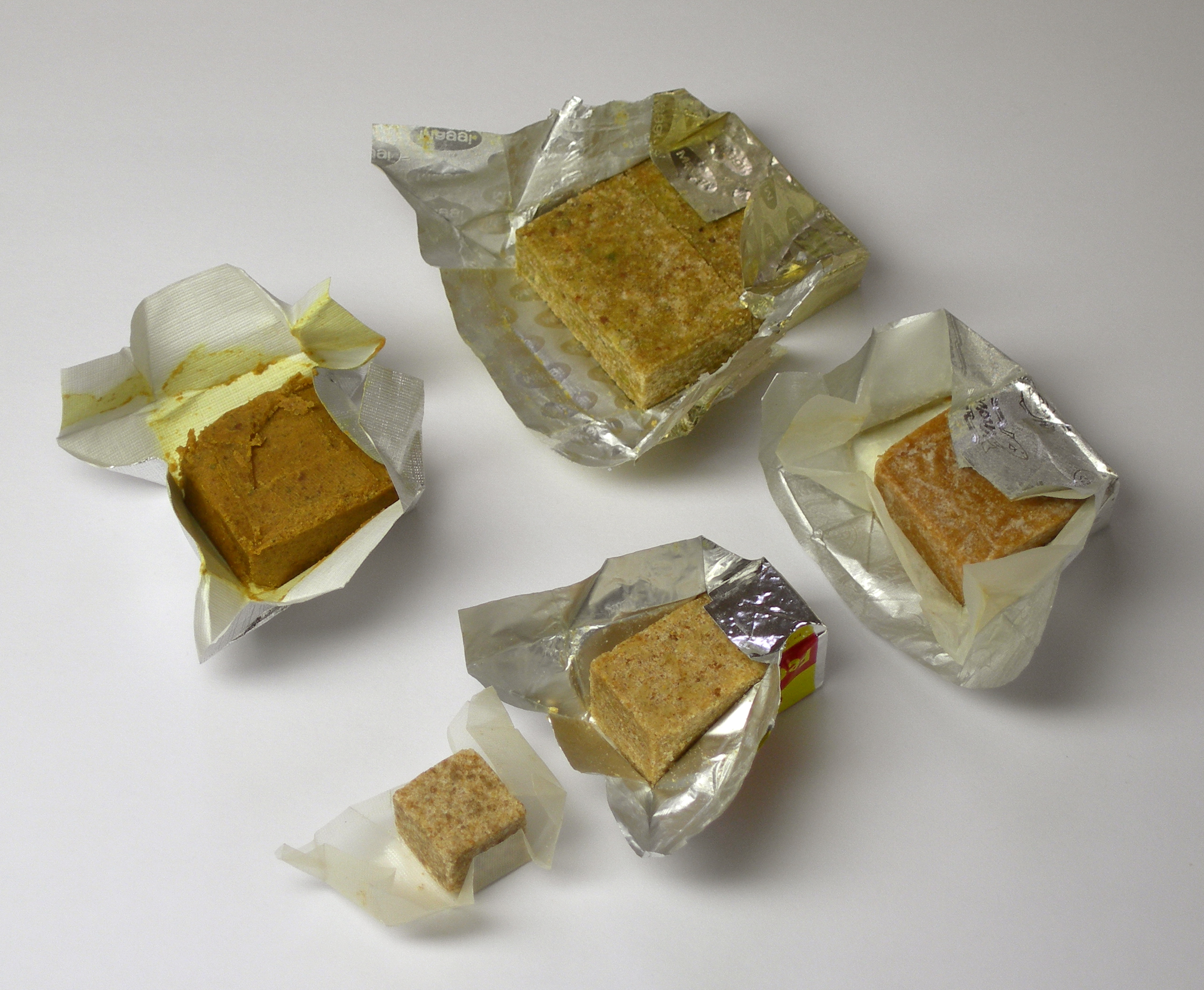
Stock cubes, the most common type of meat extract

Meat extract is highly concentrated meat stock, usually made from beef or chicken. It is used to add meat flavor in cooking, and to make broth for soups and other liquid-based foods.

Meat extract was invented by Baron Justus von Liebig, a German 19th-century organic chemist. Liebig specialised in chemistry and the classification of food and wrote a paper on how the nutritional value of a meat is lost by boiling. Liebig's view was that meat juices, as well as the fibres, contained much important nutritional value and that these were lost by boiling or cooking in unenclosed vessels. Fuelled by a desire to help feed the undernourished, in 1840 he developed a concentrated beef extract, Extractum carnis Liebig, to provide a nutritious meat substitute for those unable to afford the real thing. However, it took 30 kg of meat to produce 1 kg of extract, making the extract too expensive.

== Commercialization ==
=== Liebig's Extract of Meat Company ===
Liebig went on to co-found the Liebig's Extract of Meat Company, (later Oxo), in London whose factory, opened in 1865 in Fray Bentos, a port in Uruguay, took advantage of meat from cattle being raised for their hides — at one third the price of British meat. Before that, it was the Giebert et Compagnie (April 1863).

=== Bovril ===
In the 1870s, John Lawson Johnston invented 'Johnston's Fluid Beef', later renamed Bovril. Unlike Liebig's meat extract, Bovril also contained flavourings. It was manufactured in Argentina and Uruguay which could provide cheap cattle.

=== Effects ===
Liebig and Bovril were important contributors to the beef industry in South America.

=== Bonox ===
On the market in 1919 and created by the Fred Walker and Company Bonox is manufactured in Australia. When it was created it was often offered as an alternative hot drink with it being common to offer "Coffee, tea or Bonox".

== Today ==
Meat extracts have largely been supplanted by bouillon cubes and yeast extract. It remains as an ingredient in mid-and-higher-end bouillon cubes to provide a flavor insufficiently emulated by artificial means. It is typically made by a large-scale cooking system similar to what is used to make pre-packaged broth, followed by dehydration.

Some brands of meat extract, such as Oxo and Bovril, now contain yeast extract as well as meat extract. For example, the current formulation of Bovril contains 41% beef stock, 24% yeast extract, 1% dehydrated beef and salt (388 mg sodium per 100g), spice extracts and flavor enhancers among other ingredients.

High purity meat extract is still available from laboratory supply companies for microbiology.

== See also ==
- List of dried foods
- Portable soup

== Bibliography ==
- Günther Klaus Judel, "Die Geschichte von Liebigs Fleischextrakt: Zur populärsten Erfindung des berühmten Chemikers" (The History of Liebig's Meat Extract: On the famous chemist's most popular invention), Spiegel der Forschung: Wissenschaftsmagazin der Justus-Liebig-Universität Gießen 20:1/2:6, October 2003. (in German)
