= Thomas Jordan (Royal Navy officer) =

Royal Navy officer

- Military career
- Branch: Royal Navy
- Commands: HMS Kingfisher (1770), HMS Galatea (1778)
- Conflicts: American War of Independence (e.g., Frederica naval action)

Thomas Jordan was an officer of the Royal Navy. He served during the American War of Independence.

In September 1770, he was the first commander of the 14-gun HMS Kingfisher.

Jordan was sent to North America in command of the 20-gun HMS Galatea. He fought at the Frederica naval action in 1778, in overall command of British naval forces there. His ship was the only not to be captured by the American marines in the battle.
