= USS Revenge (1777) =

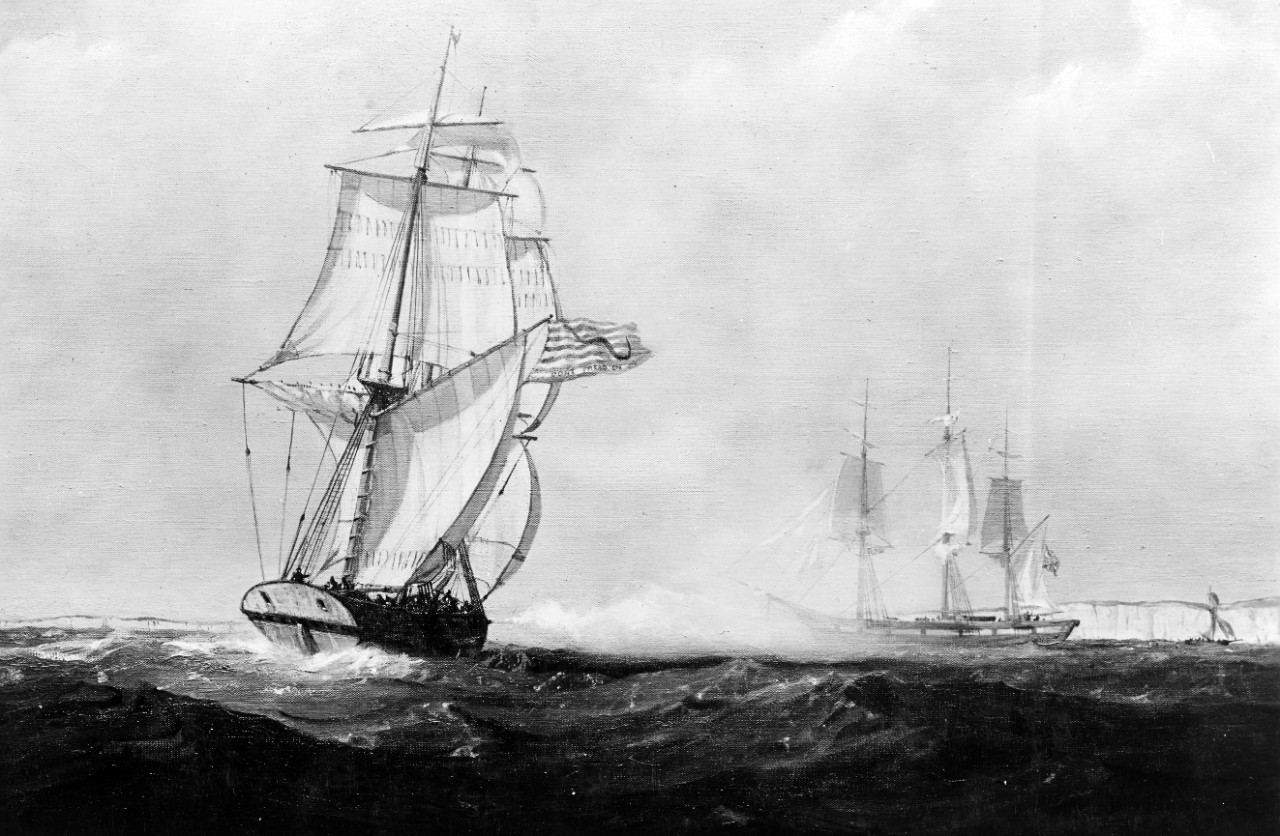
- Painting of Revenge in the English Channel by John Prentiss Benson

History

United States
- Name: USS Revenge
- Acquired: by purchase, 1777
- Fate: Sold, 12 March 1779
- Acquired: by purchase, 1779
- Captured: 1779

General characteristics
- Type: Cutter
- Complement: 106 officers and enlisted
- Armament: 14 × 6-pounder guns; 22 × swivels

USS Revenge was a 14-gun cutter of the Continental Navy.

== Career ==
William Hodge, an agent of the American commissioners to France, Benjamin Franklin, and Silas Deane purchased Revenge at Dunkirk, France, for Continental service in the spring or summer of 1777.

The British Ambassador to Paris complained that the ship had been fitted in a French (and supposedly neutral) port; but Hodge circumvented the diplomatic objection by a feigned sale of the cutter to an English subject, Richard Allen. Revenge departed Dunkirk, on 17 July 1777, ostensibly for Bergen, Norway; but, as soon as she was at sea, Captain Gustavus Conyngham, the "Dunkirk Pirate" who had recently preyed upon British shipping in Surprise, took command; hoisted Continental colors; and headed for the North Sea. Four days later Revenge captured the large schooner Happy Return; and, on the 23rd, made a prize of the brig Maria. Since British warships were nearby and threatening during both captures, Conyngham burned the prizes. The brig Patty was brought to on the 25th and ransomed. These Continental successes, so close to the shores of England, sent London insurance rates skyrocketing and inhibited British trade.

On the 21st or 26th, Revenge captured Northampton; but that brig was recaptured by HM Tender Kitty before she could reach port for condemnation proceedings.

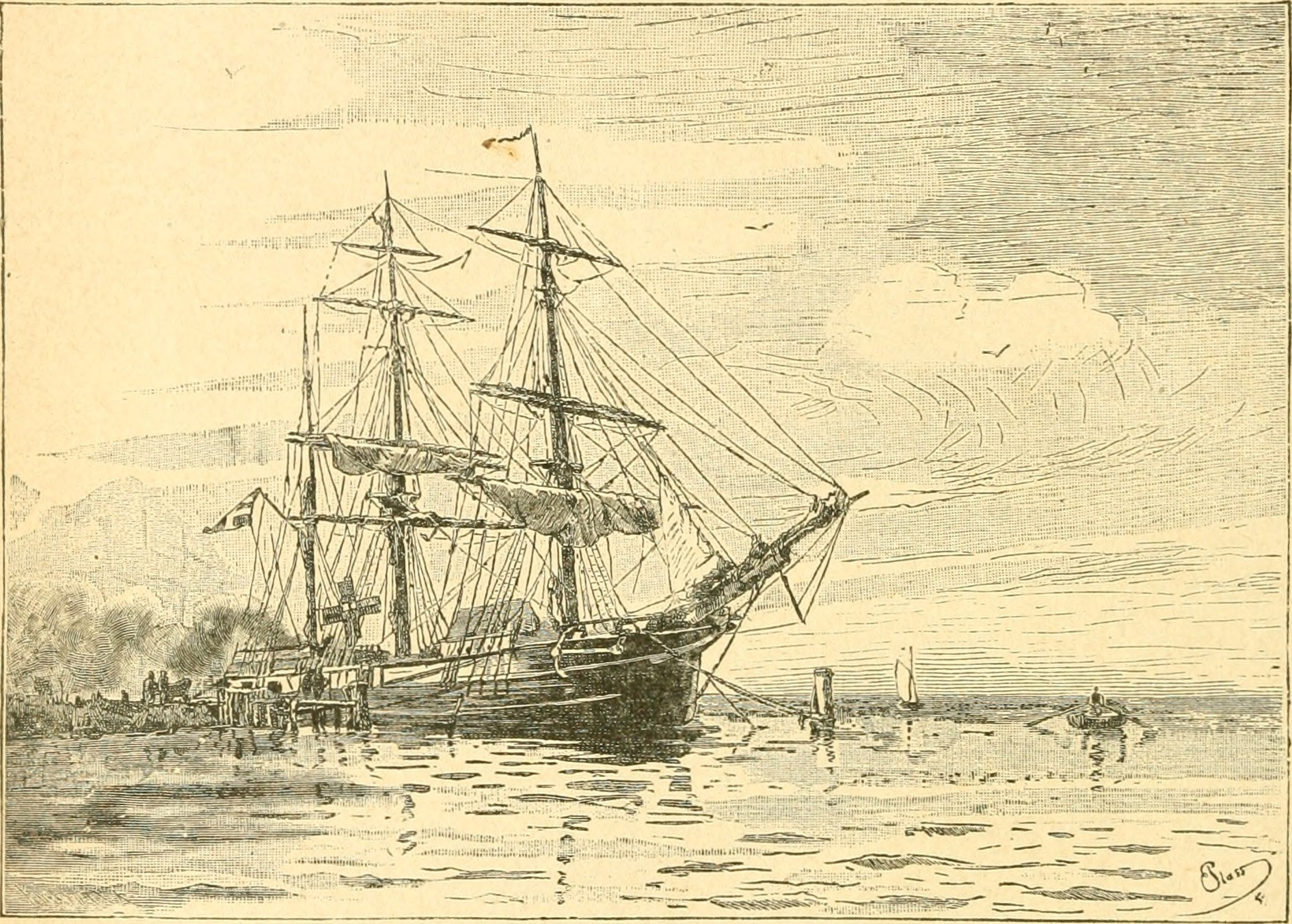
Revenge at Kinehead, Ireland for supplies

For two months Revenge remained at sea cruising off north-western Europe and the British Isles before she put in at Kinehead on the northwestern coast of Ireland to repair her bowsprit and to replenish her casks of fresh water.

Conyngham, who had been sending his prizes to ports in Spain, now himself headed for the Bay of Biscay, putting in at Ferrol. In the coming months, Revenge made several cruises from Spanish ports and captured many prizes. On one of the cruises, Conyngham transited the Straits of Gibraltar and operated in the Mediterranean Sea; and, on another, he sailed to the Azores and the Canary Islands.

Captured brig "Black Prince" 22 August 1777. Captured French brig "Gracieux", later released after Spanish government protest.

In March, 1778 she captured sloop "Betsy" on 10th, snow "Fanny" on the 12th, and brigantine "Peace & harmony" from a convoy. Betsy was recaptured before making port. On 20 March she captured a tender of HMS Enterprize, burning her on 22 March. On the 24th she captured privateer "Hope" off the Straits of Gibraltar, but Hope was later recaptured. On 16 April 1778 she captured brig "Tapley" near Cádiz, Spain. On 31 May 1778 she captured Swedish brig "Henrica Sophia" that was transporting a British owned cargo. Word of the cutter's great success reached British ears and the Admiralty ordered English warships to find and destroy her. Moreover, as Revenge's fame spread, British diplomatic pressure was brought to bear on the Spanish court to bar her from Spanish ports. Conyngham quietly refitted the ship in a small Spanish port and sailed for the West Indies on 1 September 1778. Before reaching Martinique, Revenge had captured 60 British vessels, destroying 33 and sending 27 to port as prizes.

A cruise in the Caribbean added several other ships, including two British privateers, to her score before Revenge arrived at Philadelphia, Pennsylvania on 21 February 1779, laden with arms and munitions for the Continental Army in South Carolina. The cutter was sold at public auction by an act of Congress of 12 March 1779.

Soon after the sale to a firm of Philadelphia merchants for service as a privateer, Revenge operated briefly under charter protecting shipping on the Delaware River.

== Fate ==
Revenge sailed from the Delaware Capes in April, in a quest for prizes. Conyngham was again Revenge's commander and, now, her part-owner. However, her luck had changed. HMS Galatea captured Revenge on 27 April 1779 as Revenge chased two privateers off the New York coast.
