= Portable soup =

18th/19th century dehydrated food

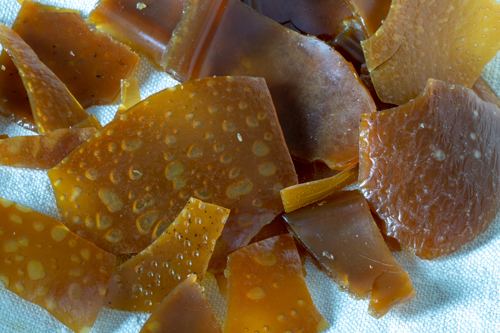
- Alternative names: Pocket soup, veal glue
- Type: Dehydrated food
- Place of origin: United Kingdom

Portable soup was a form of dehydrated food of English origin used in the 18th and 19th centuries. It was a precursor of meat extract and bouillon cubes, and of industrially dehydrated and instant food. It is also known as pocket soup or veal glue. It is essentially a partially dehydrated broth and a solid counterpart of the glace de viande (meat glaze) used in French cuisine. It was long a staple of British seamen, military and explorers, as it would keep for many months or even a year. In this context, it was considered a filling and nutritious dish.

== Process ==
Portable soup was made from a slow-cooked beef or veal broth (often 6 to 8 hours), reduced, degreased to remove the fat (which may spoil and become rancid over time) and then reduced repeatedly until it solidified into a jelly. Once it was sufficiently gelatinous to hold its form, it was placed on pieces of flannel or unglazed earthenware dishes and rotated regularly to dry it further. Historically, this was a seasonal process attempted only in the winter when humidity was low. Once dry, it was wrapped in paper and stored in boxes.

== History ==
=== Hugh Plat ===
In the late sixteenth century, Sir Hugh Plat wrote, in his unpublished notes, of portable soup as a potential military rations for the army and navy, describing it as meat broth boiled down to a thick and dry paste which he called "gelly". Plat's basic recipe was to boil the feet or legs of beef cattle for a long time to make "a good broath" which was then strained and boiled down to "a strong & stiff gelly". This in turn was dried on clean cloths in a windy place out of the sun, cut with wire into pieces, powdered with flour to stop the pieces from sticking, and stored in wooden boxes.

Made in March, it would "keepe all the yeere" (keep all year). Alternatively, the dry jelly could be "stamped" into shape with a wooden die, like the "Genoa Paste" of quinces familiar to Plat and other cooks of the time. He instructed that no sugar or salt should be added to the jelly because such taste would be concentrated by the boiling process, although he speculated that saffron might add colour, and that rosewater could also be added at this stage. He wondered whether baked flour or grated bread could be incorporated to make the jelly "serve as bread and meate the better", and whether the addition of isinglass would make it stiffer. The jelly was variously described by Plat as a "Victual for Warr", "dry gelly carried to the sea", and a food for soldiers on the march. Plat envisaged using this jelly either as the base for soup, or "neat" as a concentrated food. Reconstitution as soup simply involved dissolving a piece of the jelly in hot water to make "good broath", and, because jelly and water alone would be rather bland, adding such flavourings as were available or to taste – sugar, salt, liquorice, aniseed, or other "convenient spice".

Plat emphasised the utility of the jelly as field rations, for "a soldier may satisfie his hunger herwith, whilst hee is in his march". He recommended that a leg of beef or veal be boiled with every 6 or 8 neats' (cows') feet to produce a jelly which would more easily dissolve in the mouth.

The existence of portable soups (called "bouillons en tablettes" in French) is also mentioned, in 1690, in Antoine Furetière's Dictionnaire universel, under the article Tablette: "On a vue des consommés reduits en tablettes, ou des bouillons à porter en poche". ("We have seen consommés reduced into tablets, or broth to carry in your pocket".)

=== Mrs Dubois ===
As a mass-produced product, portable soup is generally held to have been invented by Mrs Dubois, a London tavern keeper who, with William Cookworthy, won a contract to manufacture it for the Royal Navy in 1756. Mrs Dubois was described as "a person of good character and circumstances". She operated from a tavern, at the Golden Head, in Three Kings Court in Fleet Street. She may have been the widow of a French chef and tavern keeper; but, by 1757, she had a new husband, Edward Bennet, son of a Sheffield knife-grinder. The contract with the navy was alluded to in advertising material long after it had lapsed; Benjamin Piper, successor in the business, announced he was "Successor to Messieurs Bennet and Dubois, The original Portable Soup-Makers to His Majesty’s Royal Navy" while one Vigor, successor to Piper, used the same rubric on his flyers. The naval authorities hoped that portable soup would prevent scurvy among their crews. They therefore allotted a daily ration to each sailor beginning in the 1750s. Captain Cook was convinced of its efficacy and carried it on both his South Seas voyages.

== Naval usage ==
Captain Charles Douglas, HMS Emerald wrote to the Admiralty from Sheerness 5 April 1769 requesting an additional quantity of Portable soup conducive to the welfare of the people for his voyage to Lapland [to observe the Transit of Venus, only it was cloudy].

== Expeditions ==
Lewis and Clark carried portable soup on their 1804–1806 expedition into the territory of the newly acquired Louisiana Purchase. According to his letter from Fredericktown, Ohio, on 15 April 1803, Lewis purchased the soup from Francois Baillet, a cook in Philadelphia. He paid $289.50 for the 193 pounds of portable soup stored in "32 canisters". Lewis carried it with him overland to the embarkation point on the Ohio River.

=== Decline ===
By 1815, with the publication of physician Gilbert Blane's On the Comparative Health of the British Navy from 1779 to 1814, the efficacy of portable soup for promoting the health of sailors was found lacking. Opinion shifted in favour of canned meats, a process invented in France in 1806, and the proliferation of meat extract, invented by Justus von Liebig.

A similar product, portable gelatin, was developed by American inventor Peter Cooper in 1845, as a staple meal or dessert for families.

Nevertheless, as late as 1881 portable soup was still being described by the Household Cyclopedia as:

exceedingly convenient for private families, for by putting one of the cakes in a saucepan with about a quart of water, and a little salt, a basin of good broth may be made in a few minutes.

== Cultural references ==
- In Johann David Wyss's novel The Swiss Family Robinson (1812), set in the 1790s, portable soup makes a number of appearances. The youngest son, Franz, first mistakes it for glue, and then later suggests it be used as a substitute.
- The Aubrey–Maturin series by Patrick O'Brian, set on the high seas during the Napoleonic Wars, is replete with references to portable soup.

== See also ==
- Aspic, another form of savoury jelly
- Brick chili
- List of dried foods
- List of soups
- P'tcha, an Ashkenazi version of calves' foot jelly
- Pea soup
