= HMS Jason (1763) =

Frigate of the Royal Navy

History

Great Britain
- Name: HMS Jason
- Ordered: 30 January 1762
- Builder: Robert Batson, Limehouse
- Laid down: 1 April 1762
- Launched: 13 June 1763
- Completed: 19 September 1765 at Deptford Dockyard
- Commissioned: August 1765
- Fate: Sold to break up at Chatham, 10 February 1785

General characteristics
- Class & type: Richmond-class fifth-rate frigate
- Tons burthen: 689 59/94 bm
- Length: 127 ft 4 in (38.81 m) (gundeck); 106 ft 10.25 in (32.5692 m) (keel)
- Beam: 34 ft 10 in (10.62 m)
- Depth of hold: 12 ft 0.5 in (3.670 m)
- Sail plan: Full-rigged ship
- Complement: 210 officers and men
- Armament: 32 guns comprising; Upperdeck: 26 × 12-pounder guns; Quarterdeck: 4 × 6-pounder guns; Forecastle: 2 × 6-pounder guns

HMS Jason was a 32-gun Richmond-class fifth-rate frigate of the Royal Navy. She was launched in 1763 and served throughout the American Revolutionary War.
