= HMS Emerald (1762) =

HMS Emerald was a 32-gun, fifth-rate frigate launched in 1762 and broken up in 1793.

== Service history ==
HMS Emerald was ordered to Lapland in 1769. Captain Charles Douglas wrote from Sheerness to the Admiralty, 5 April 1769 requesting an additional quantity of portable soup conducive to the welfare of the people for his voyage to observe the Transit of Venus. however it was cloudy.

HMS Emerald arrived at Staten Island 12 August 1776, bringing Rear Admiral Molyneux Schuldham the supply of stationary which the Admiralty had ordered the Navy Board to send him. She and HMS Richmond captured French brig Alexandrine in the Chesapeake Bay off the mouth of the Rappahannock River 3 January, 1778.
