= HMS Richmond (1757) =

Frigate of the Royal Navy

History

Great Britain
- Name: HMS Richmond
- Ordered: 12 March 1756
- Builder: John Buxton, Deptford
- Laid down: April 1756
- Launched: 12 November 1757
- Completed: 7 December 1757 at Deptford Dockyard
- Commissioned: April 1757
- Fate: Captured by the French Navy in the Chesapeake Bay, 11 September 1781

France
- Name: Richemont
- Acquired: 1781 by capture
- Fate: Scuttled by fire on 19 May 1793

General characteristics
- Class & type: Richmond-class fifth-rate frigate
- Displacement: 1,000 (tons; French)
- Tons burthen: 664 16/94 (bm)
- Length: 127 ft 1 1/2 in (38.748 m) (gundeck); 107 ft 1 1/8 in (32.642 m) (keel)
- Beam: 34 ft 1 3/4 in (10.408 m)
- Depth of hold: 11 ft 10 in (3.61 m)
- Sail plan: Full-rigged ship
- Complement: British service:210 officers and men; French service: 220 (war) & 150 (peace)
- Armament: Upperdeck: 26 × 12-pounder guns; QD: 4 × 6-pounder guns; Fc: 2 × 6-pounder guns

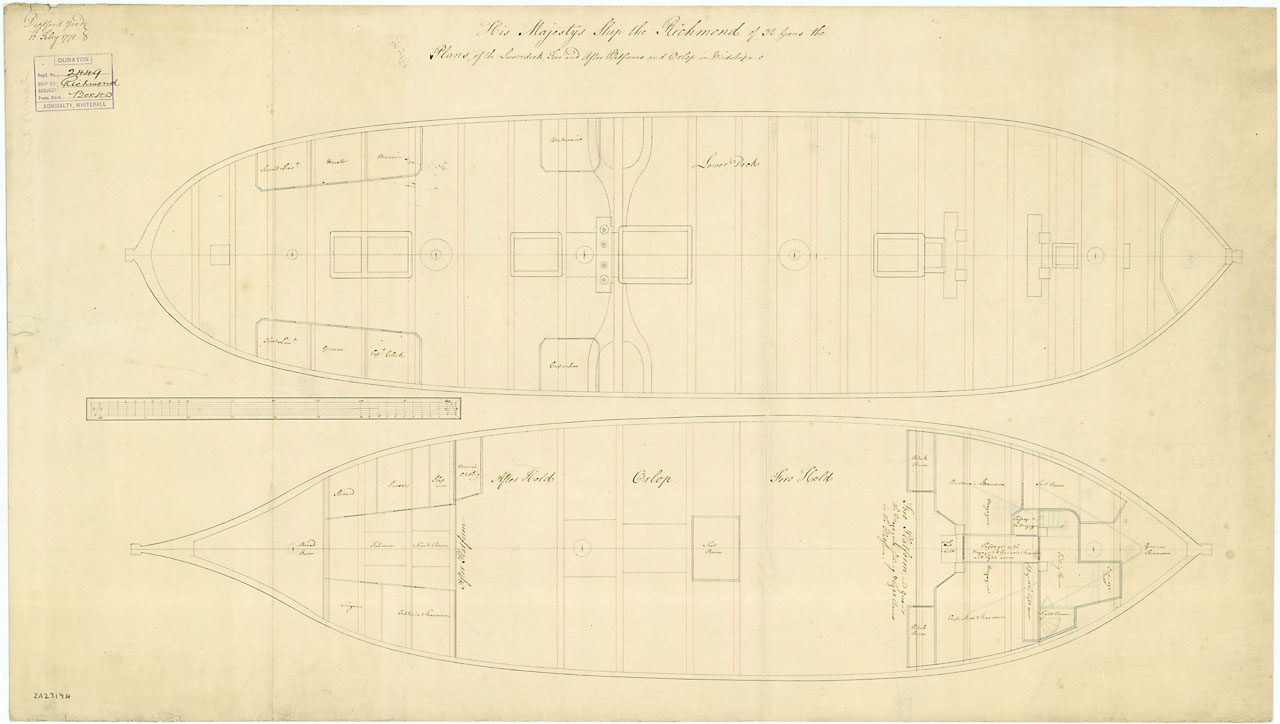
An image of HMS Richmond (1757)

HMS Richmond was the name ship of the six-vessel, 32-gun Richmond-class fifth-rate frigates of the Royal Navy. She was launched in 1757 and served throughout the American Revolutionary War. She and HMS Emerald captured French brig Alexandrine in the Chesapeake Bay off the mouth of the Rappahannock River 3 January, 1778. She captured 1 prize off Cape Charles in February, 1778. On 5 February a sloop ran aground off Cherry Point while being pursued by Richmond and HMS Solebay and was burned. On 9 February Richmond and HMS Solebay captured Maryland State Govt. trading vessel Lydia off St. Mary's River, later ruled a recapture. On 28 February she captured Danish flagged, American owned ship Good Hope off Cape Henry. She was captured by the French 74-gun Bourgogne and the frigate Aigrette on 11 September 1781 in the Chesapeake. She then served as Richemont under Lieutenant Mortemart.

On 12 April 1782 she fought at the Battle of the Saintes and famously tried to tow Glorieux to safety. A painting of the attempt was made later, and was on display at the Ministry of the Navy in the 1930.

== Fate ==
Richmond was involved in the expedition to Sardinia in 1793. The French burned her on 19 May to prevent the Spanish from capturing her.
