= Richmond-class frigate =

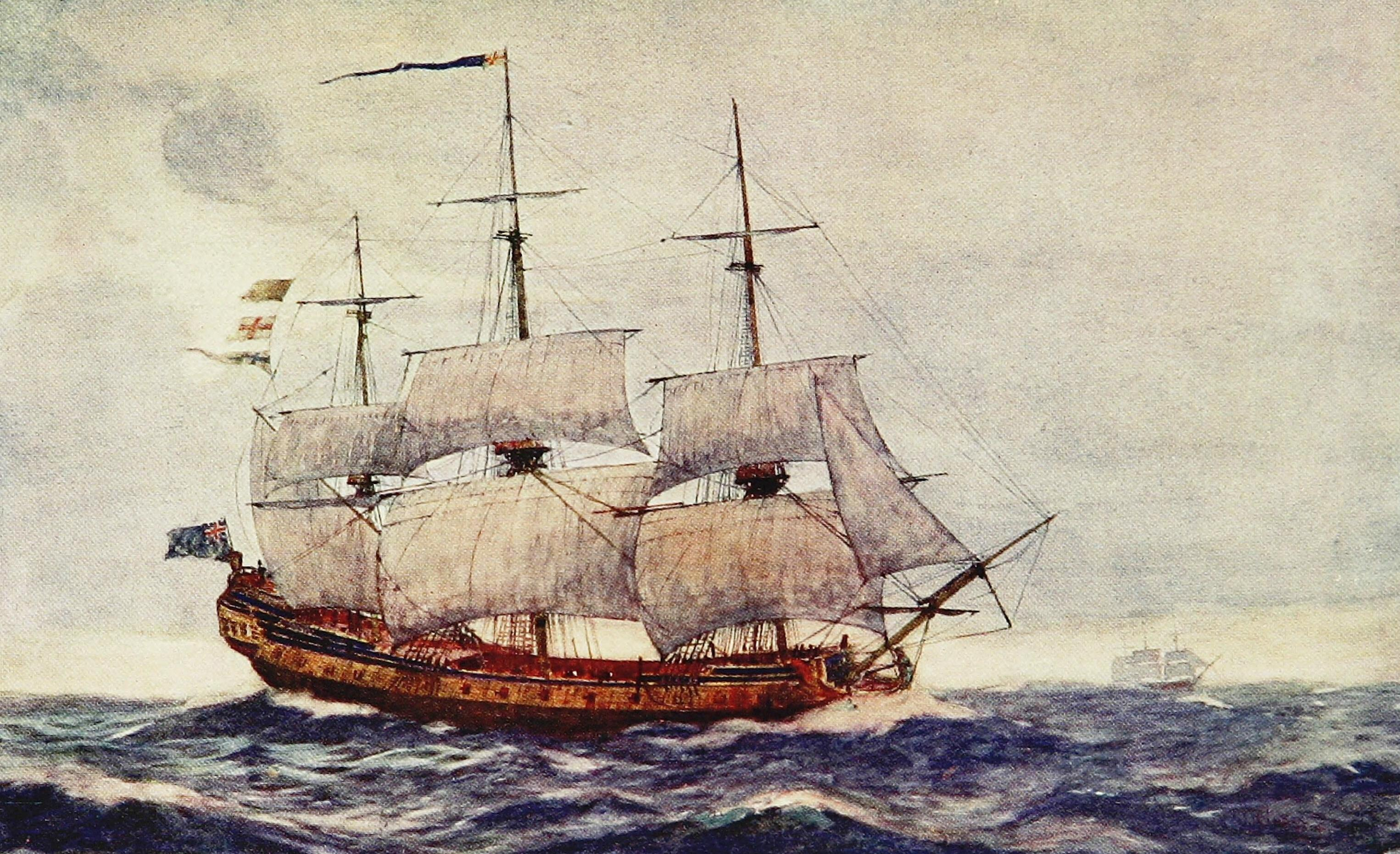
- 1907 illustration of Juno

Class overview
- Built: 1756–1763
- In commission: 1758–1811
- Completed: 6

General characteristics
- Tons burthen: 646 12/94 bm (first batch); 677 40/94 bm (modified design)
- Length: 127 ft (39 m)
- Beam: 34 ft (10 m) (first batch); 34 ft 6 in (10.52 m) (modified design)
- Depth of hold: 11 ft 9 in (3.58 m) (first batch); 12 ft .5 in (3.670 m) (modified design)
- Sail plan: Full-rigged ship
- Complement: 210
- Armament: Upperdeck: 26 × 12-pounder guns; Quarterdeck: 4 × 6-pounder guns; Forecastle: 2 × 6-pounder guns

The Richmond-class frigates were 32-gun sailing frigates of the fifth rate produced for the Royal Navy. They were designed in 1756 by the Navy's Surveyor, William Bately, and were his equivalent of the Southampton-class frigates designed by Bately's co-Surveyor, Thomas Slade. They were faster ships than the Southamptons, and were weatherly craft, remaining dry even in high seas. Three ships were ordered to this design between 1756 and 1757, while a second batch of three ships was ordered between 1761 and 1762 to a slightly modified design.

== Ships in class ==
=== First batch ===
- Richmond
  - Ordered: 12 March 1756
  - Built by: John Buxton, Deptford.
  - Keel laid: April 1756
  - Launched: 12 November 1757
  - Completed: 7 December 1757 at Deptford Dockyard.
  - Fate: Burnt at Sardinia to avoid capture on 19 May 1793.
- Juno
  - Ordered: 1 June 1756
  - Built by: William Alexander, Rotherhithe.
  - Keel laid: June 1756
  - Launched: 29 September 1757
  - Completed: 6 November 1757 at Deptford Dockyard.
  - Fate: Burnt at Rhode Island to avoid capture on 5 August 1778.
- Thames
  - Ordered: 11 January 1757
  - Built by: Henry Adams, Bucklers Hard.
  - Keel laid: February 1757
  - Launched: 10 April 1758
  - Completed: 29 May 1758 at Portsmouth Dockyard.
  - Fate: Taken to pieces at Woolwich Dockyard in September 1803.

=== Second (modified) batch ===
- Lark
  - Ordered: 24 March 1761
  - Built by: Elias Bird, Rotherhithe.
  - Keel laid: 5 May 1761
  - Launched: 10 May 1762
  - Completed: 9 July 1762 at Deptford Dockyard.
  - Fate: Burnt at Rhode Island to avoid capture on 5 August 1778.
- Boston
  - Ordered: 24 March 1761
  - Built by: Robert Inwood, Rotherhithe.
  - Keel laid: 5 May 1761
  - Launched: 11 May 1762
  - Completed: 16 July 1762 at Deptford Dockyard.
  - Fate: Taken to pieces at Plymouth Dockyard in May 1811.
- Jason
  - Ordered: 30 January 1762
  - Built by: Robert Batson, Limehouse.
  - Keel laid: 1 April 1762
  - Launched: 13 June 1763
  - Completed: 19 September 1765 at Deptford Dockyard.
  - Fate: Sold at Chatham Dockyard on 10 February 1785.
