= Frederica naval action =

Small naval battle during the American Revolutionary War

- Part of the American Revolutionary War
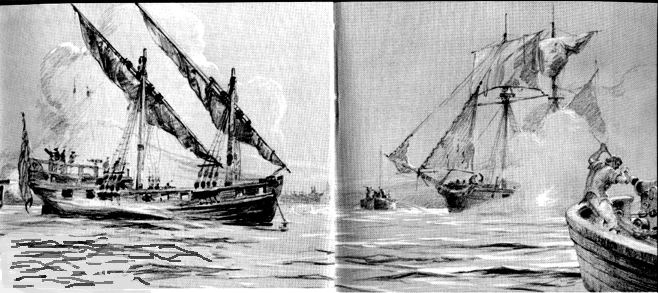
- Georgia Navy vessels capturing the British squadron on Frederica River.
Date	April 19, 1778
Location	Frederica River off St. Simons Island, Georgia 31.1946°N 81.4186°W
Result	United States victory

Belligerents
United States	Great Britain

Commanders and leaders
Colonel Samuel Elbert	(Kingdom of Great Britain) Captain Thomas Jordan (nominally)

Strength
3 galleys	1 post-ship 2 sloops 1 brig

Casualties and losses
None	2 sloops captured 1 brig captured

The Frederica naval action was a naval battle during the American Revolutionary War in which three galleys of the Georgia State Navy captured a British raiding party off the coast of Georgia. The action occurred on April 19, 1778.

== Background ==
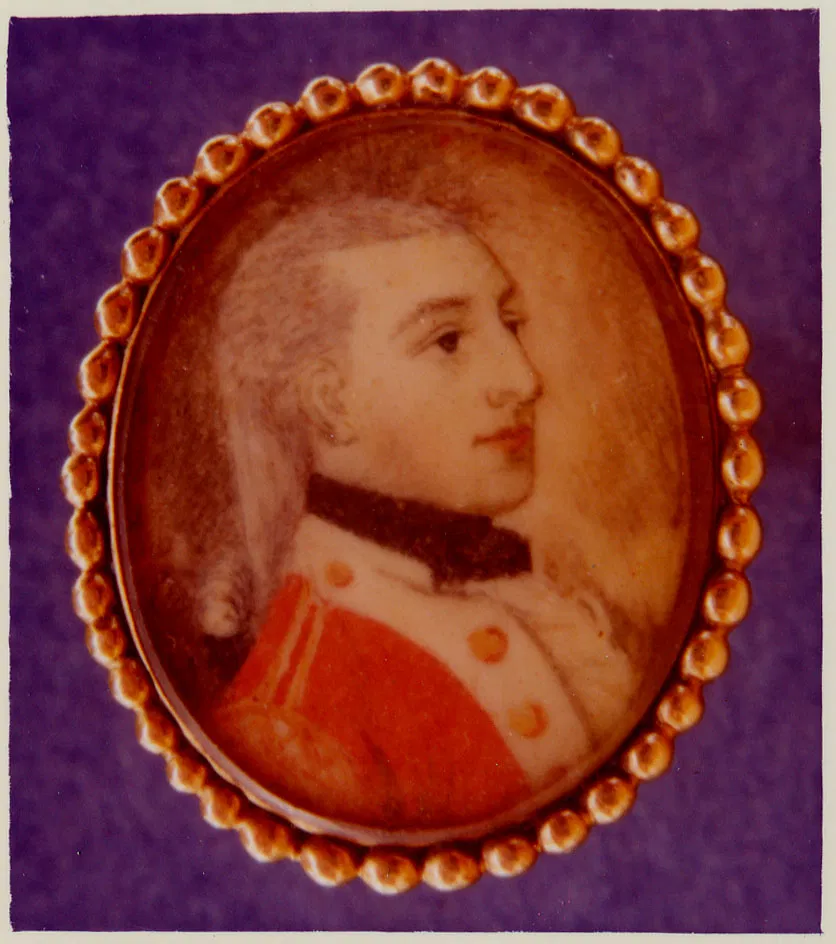
Samuel Elbert

The state of Georgia had twice attempted, without success, to invade the British colony of East Florida. In 1778 a third attempt was launched, to be headed by Colonel Samuel Elbert. The catalyst for the invasion was the discovery, in April of that year, that four British ships were sailing in St. Simons Sound. Two of these, the sloop Rebecca and the watering brig Hatter, were private vessels under contract to the Royal Navy; the other two, the post ship HMS Galatea and sloop HMS Hinchinbrook, were Royal Navy ships.

For defense, Elbert had the galleys of the Georgia State Navy; four of these, Washington, Lee, Congress, and Bulloch, had been underwritten by the Continental Congress and constructed in Savannah between 1776 and 1777. All four were under the command of Commodore Oliver Bowen.

=== Prelude ===
On April 15 Elbert received word that the Royal Navy had been spotted off the coast, and detailed around 360 men of the Georgia Continental battalions of Fort Howe to march to Darien; from here they were to embark upon three of the galleys, Washington, Bulloch, and Lee. The first was led by Captain John Hardee, the second by Captain Archibald Hatcher, and the third by Captain John Cutler Braddock.

By the middle of the afternoon on April 18, the flotilla had entered the Frederica River and anchored at Pikes Bluff, close to a mile and a half above Fort Frederica. Troops under Colonel Robert Rae and Major Daniel Roberts were the first to land, followed, under Elbert's orders, by Captain George Young and the artillery detachment. They set up the field piece on the island. Officers were chosen to command troops on the galleys. Colonel John White was assigned to Lee, Captain George Melvin to Washington, and Lieutenant Barnard Patty to Bulloch. Elbert ordered Rae to take 100 of his men and march them to the fort, where British prisoners were taken. Some of the men in the scouting party which had been landed escaped by boat, taking word to Galatea to alert Captain Thomas Jordan to the imminent American attack. Jordan responded by sending a ship loaded with soldiers to assist Hinchinbrook and Rebecca.

Elbert received some intelligence regarding the two British ships; he decided, however, that it was too late in the evening to initiate an attack, and ordered his men to rest for the night.

== Battle ==
Early on the morning of April 19, Elbert took the galleys down the river to attack the British ships, which were already ranged in their order of battle. The galleys likely initiated the attack shortly after first light, around 5:30 that morning, beginning their assault on Hinchinbrook, Rebecca, and Hatter. Galleys are lightly built craft that are optimized for rowing. They are fragile and at a severe disadvantage against strongly built sailing vessels. However, galleys have a tactical advantage against pure sailing vessels in restricted waters or when there is no wind. Either by happenstance or by brilliant planning, the ebb tide combined with the lack of wind to give the Americans the advantage; with no wind, the British ships were unable to sail forward to board and storm the galleys, and were forced to remain stationary. Consequently, the galleys began by firing a few random shots at the British vessels before anchoring a safe distance away and beginning a heavy cannonade.

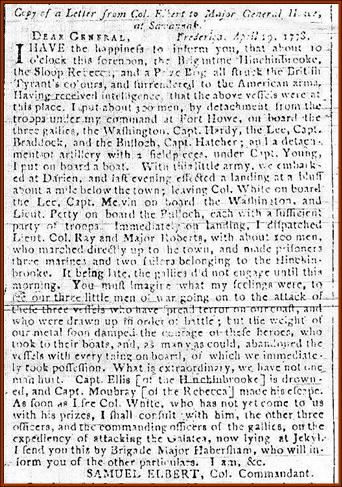
Elbert's letter to General Howe was later published in several Southern newspapers

Hinchinbrook and Rebecca carried four-pounder guns that were no match for the heavier ordnance on the galleys, so they began dropping downriver, hoping to find a place to maneuver and possibly catch a breeze. They thought that the channel was deep, and sailed accordingly; however, at around 10 in the morning, Rebecca suddenly grounded at a place called "Raccoon Gut". Hinchinbrook and Hatter soon suffered the same fate. As the galleys were drawing nearer, the British made the decision to abandon ship. Most of the officers and men crowded into the ship's boats and rowed downriver to Galatea, which was still anchored in the sound. A few of Hinchinbrook's crew were left behind.

== Aftermath ==
Although the battle was comparatively minor, it had a galvanizing effect on the people of Georgia, for it disabled two ships that had been capturing American merchant ships off the South Carolina and Georgia coasts. More importantly, it helped to delay by over eight months a British attempt to capture Fort Morris and the town of Sunbury. At the same time, it demonstrated the effectiveness of heavily armed galleys in confined waters.

Elbert, for his part, was deeply impressed with the victory, writing to General Robert Howe that

...you must imagine what my feelings were, to see our three little men of war going on to the attack of these three vessels who have spread terror on our coast, and who were drawn up in order of battle; but the weight of our metal soon damped the courage of these heroes, who soon took to their boats: and, as many as could, abandoned the vessels with everything on board, of which we immediately took possession. What is extraordinary, we have not one man hurt...

Fresh from the victory at Frederica, Elbert went on to lead the disastrous Third Florida Expedition later that year.

== Order of battle ==
=== United States ===
- Washington (galley)
- Bulloch (galley)
- Lee (galley)

=== Great Britain ===
- HMS Galatea (frigate)
- HMS Hinchinbrook (brigantine) - Aground and captured
- Rebecca (sloop) - Aground and captured
- Hatter (brig) - Aground and captured
