= Household Cyclopedia =

The Household Cyclopedia of General Information was an American guide to housekeeping compiled by physician and author Henry Hartshorne, then a professor of hygiene at the University of Pennsylvania. The guide, which describes itself as containing "ten thousand receipts, in all the useful and domestic arts", also included a cookbook. The first edition was published in 1871, and a subsequent edition, published by T. Ellwood Zell, came out in 1881.
