= Georgia State Navy =

During the American Revolutionary War, the Georgia State Navy consisted of only a few ships, most of which were destroyed in 1778 and 1779.

== History ==
Georgia Naval Ensign

Georgia was one of the first of the Thirteen Colonies to engage a ship for its own naval purposes. In June 1775, not long after the American Revolutionary War broke out, it commissioned an armed sloop for the purpose of seizing a British transport carrying munitions that was destined for the Georgia port of Savannah. Funds were authorized in 1776 for expeditions by Captains Oliver Bowen and Job Pray to acquire and arm ships in the West Indies; whether these were actually successful is unknown. In November 1776 the state established an admiralty court for adjudicating the distribution of prizes captured at sea.

The state also authorized the construction of row galleys in 1776. A total of four were put into service: Washington, Lee, Bulloch, and Congress. The galleys' crews came from slaves seized when the Patriots confiscated British Governor James Wright's estate. In addition, troops from the Georgia State Militia went on board the galleys to serve as marines. The galleys were unsuited for use on the high seas, but with their shallow drafts and oars were well-suited to serve along the state's coast and on its rivers. They carried troops and supplies for the two unsuccessful invasions of East Florida in 1777 and 1778. During these operations the galleys also secured river crossings, escorted vessels transporting troops, and protected the army's flank.

The galleys' greatest success was the Frederica naval action on 19 April 1778. Washington, Lee, Bulloch, and some boats captured the 12-gun sloop HMS Hinchinbrook and the Loyalist privateer Rebeccas off St. Simons Island, after the British vessels had grounded and their crews had escaped ashore. The Georgia State galleys took their prizes to Sunbury. The four galleys served during the 1779 Siege of Savannah, a failed Franco-American attempt to retake the city from the British. The continued British occupation of the state (the only state in which the royal governor returned to take control), made the construction of further ships impossible.

In the late 20th century, it became a popular practice for the Governor of Georgia to award a certificate to new members of the Georgia General Assembly (and others) bestowing upon them the honorary title of Admiral of the Georgia Navy.

Galleys of the Georgia State Navy
| Name | Launch year | Armament | Captain | Fate |
|---|---|---|---|---|
| Washington | mid-1777 | 2 × 18-pounder + 2 × 12-pounder + 2 × 9-pounder + 6 × 6-pounder guns | John Hardy | Stranded and burned at Ossabaw Island by her crew in January 1779 after the fall of Sunbury, GA. |
| Bulloch | 1778 | n.a. | Archibald Hatcher | Stranded and burned at Ossabaw Island by her crew in January 1779 after the fall of Sunbury, GA. |
| Lee | mid-1777 | 1 × 18-pounder + 1 × 12-pounder + 2 × 9-pounder + 2 × 6-pounder guns | John Braddock | HM galley Comet captured Lee in March 1779; the British Royal Navy took her into service as HM galley Vindictive |
| Congress | mid-1777 | 1 × 12-pounder + 1 × 9-pounder + 2 × 4-pounder guns + 2 × 1-pounder swivel guns | John Newdigate | HM galley Comet captured Congress in March 1779; the Royal Navy took her into service as HM galley Scourge |

== See also ==
- Georgia Naval Militia
