= HMS Galatea (1776) =

History

Great Britain
- Name: HMS Galatea
- Namesake: Galatea (Greek myth)
- Ordered: 15 April and 1 December 1773
- Builder: Deptford Dockyard
- Laid down: October 1774
- Launched: 21 March 1776
- Completed: By 26 May 1776
- Fate: Broken up in April 1783

General characteristics
- Type: Sphinx-class sixth-rate post-ship
- Tons burthen: 429 23/94 bm
- Length: 108 ft (33 m) (gundeck); 89 ft 8 in (27.33 m) (keel)
- Beam: 30 ft (9.1 m)
- Depth of hold: 9 ft 8 in (2.95 m)
- Propulsion: Sail
- Sail plan: Full-rigged ship
- Complement: 140
- Armament: 20 × 9-pounder guns

HMS Galatea was a 20-gun Sphinx-class sixth-rate post-ship of the Royal Navy. She was designed by John Williams and built by Adam Hayes in Deptford Dockyard, being launched on 21 March 1776. She served during the American War of Independence.

== History ==
In 1776, the ship was sent to North America under the command of Captain Thomas Jordan with a crew of 200. She took part in the capture of 30 American ships.

On 1 January, 1778 she captured the merchant schooner Jolly Robin.

On 3 January she captured the Dutch schooner St. Ann carrying a cargo from Virginia to Curacao.

On 6 January, 1778 she captured the merchant sloop Speedwell off Charles Town, South Carolina at (33°18′N 76°28′W).

On 8 January, 1778 she captured the schooner Favorite at (33°14′N 76°38′W).

On 21 January, 1778 she captured the Continental Congress owned, Continental Navy officered trading brigantine Chance off Charles Town, South Carolina (32°17′N 77°29′W). During the operation one of her boats was stove in and her longboat sank.

On 28 January, 1778 she captured the brig Katy off Charles Town, South Carolina (33°00′N 78°26′W).

On 2 February she captured the French ship Rosiere D'Artois off Charles Town (32°07′N 76°24′W).

On 15 May, 1778 she captured the American sloop Black Joke at (33°36′N 77°35′W).

On 8 June, 1778 her pinnace captured schooner "Sally" at (31°32′N 78°03′W).

An American naval squadron led by Samuel Elbert attacked the ship near St. Simons Island in what became known as the Frederica naval action. Although the Americans captured her other three escort ships, Galatea's crew ran her aground and managed to escape without being captured.

On 28 April 1779 the American cutter Revenge, captained by Gustavus Conyngham, was captured and the crew were held aboard the Galatea. By his own report Conyngham was kept in irons until he reached prison, and was given no more than a “cold plank as my bed, a stone for a pillow”. Additionally, he was not fed properly, causing him to lose fifty pounds while imprisoned on the ship en route to his English prison.

== Fate ==
She was broken up at Sheerness in April 1783.
