= HMS Lark (1762) =

Frigate of the Royal Navy

Coordinates: 41.5201°N 71.3303°W

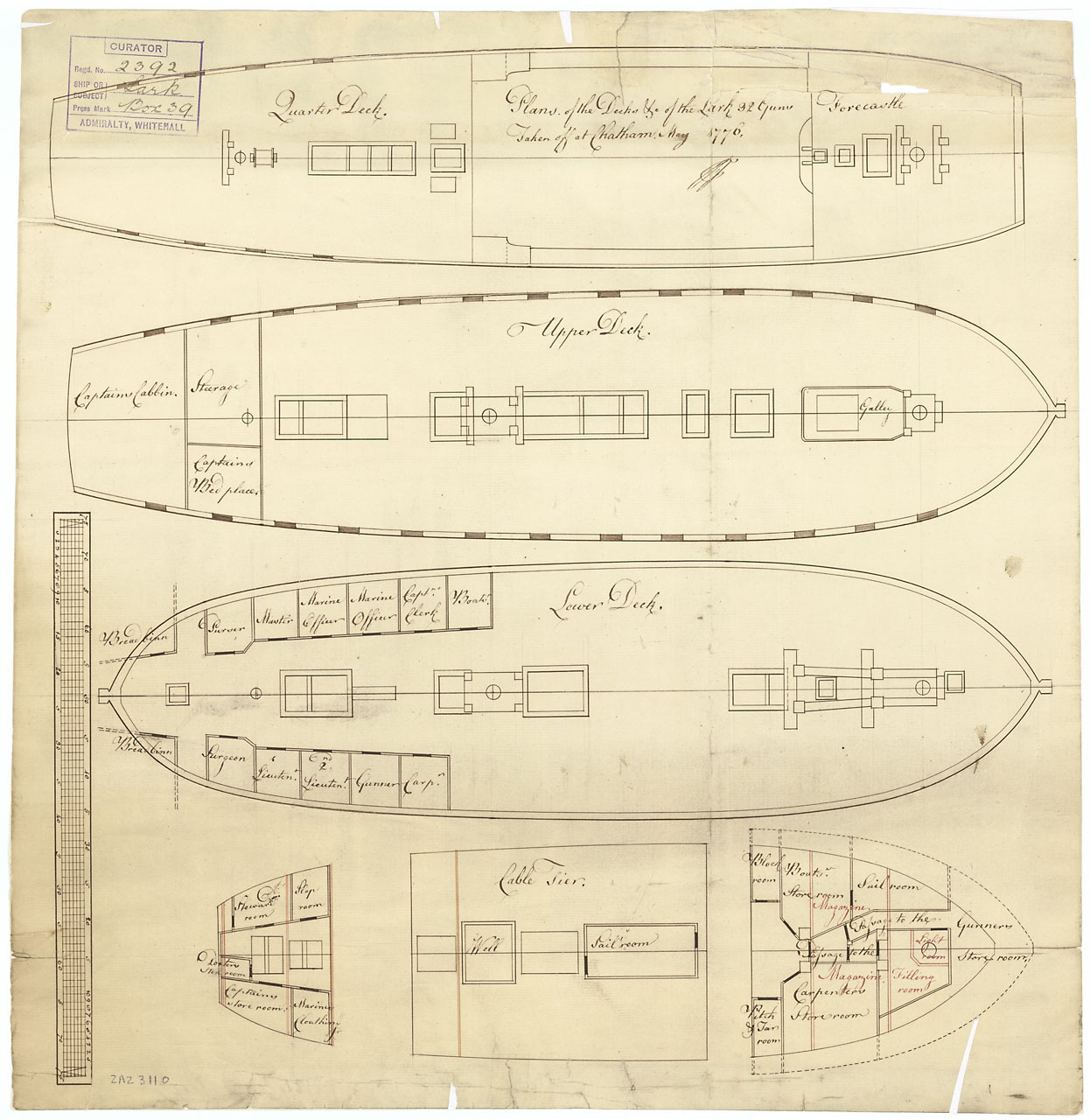

History

Great Britain
- Name: HMS Lark
- Ordered: 24 March 1761
- Builder: Elias Bird, Rotherhithe
- Laid down: 5 May 1761
- Launched: 10 May 1762
- Completed: 9 July 1762 at Deptford Dockyard
- Commissioned: May 1762
- Fate: Burnt to avoid capture at Newport, Rhode Island, 5 August 1778

General characteristics
- Class & type: Richmond-class fifth-rate frigate
- Tons burthen: 680 61/94 bm
- Length: 127 ft 2 in (38.76 m) (gundeck); 108 ft 0 3/8 in (32.928 m) (keel)
- Beam: 34 ft 5 in (10.49 m)
- Depth of hold: 12 ft 0 1/2 in (3.670 m)
- Sail plan: Full-rigged ship
- Complement: 210 officers and men
- Armament: Upperdeck: 26 × 12-pounder guns; QD: 4 × 6-pounder guns; Fc: 2 × 6-pounder guns

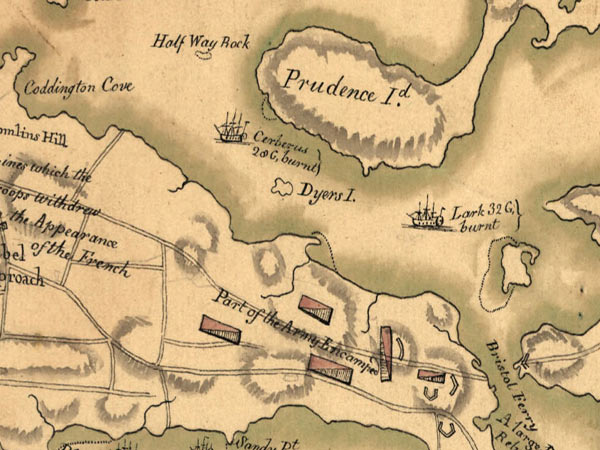
Map of the wreck of Lark

HMS Lark was a 32-gun Richmond-class frigate fifth-rate frigate of the Royal Navy. She was launched in 1762 and destroyed in Narragansett Bay in 1778, during the American Revolutionary War.

== Active service ==
On 23 September 1762 Lark and her sister ship HMS Venus were off Rame Head in Cornwall when they encountered an unidentified vessel which raised sail and fled. After a twelve-hour chase the vessel was overtaken and struck its colours in surrender to Venus. A boarding party from Venus determined the captured vessel to be a Galgo, a 14-gun Spanish privateer with a crew of 136 men.

Captain Smith sent John Crumb, the Quartermaster's Mate for trial for disertion to the enemy. His court martial 16 August 1777 onboard HMS Amazon directed the sentence of death. Admiral Lord Richard Howe had him executed immediately.

On 11 January 1778, under command of Captain Richard Smith, she chased ashore a vessel, probably schooner Sally, near the Providence River and burned it. Between 29 May and 18 July, the British captured a number of vessels: the sloops Sally and Fancy, snow Baron D'Ozell, Olive Branch, sloop Betsey, and schooner Sally. Lark shared the prize money with Kingfisher, Hope, Sphinx, and the Pigot galley.

French Admiral d'Estaing's squadron arrived in Narragansett Bay on 29 July 1778 to support the American army under General George Washington during the battle of Rhode Island. On 30 July, four French ships of the line entered Narrangansett Bay and positioned themselves north of Conanicut Island to support the American and French forces in the battle of Rhode Island. The arrival of the French vessels trapped several British vessels, Lark among them. On 5 August 1778, as Lark lay off Newport, Captain Richard Smith had her set on fire and her cables cut. She then drifted on to shore. The Royal Navy ended up having to destroy ten of their own vessels in all.

The remains of Lark are now part of a site listed on the National Register of Historic Places, the "Wreck Sites of HMS Cerberus and HMS Lark."
