= HMS Juno (1757) =

British naval vessel (1757–1778)

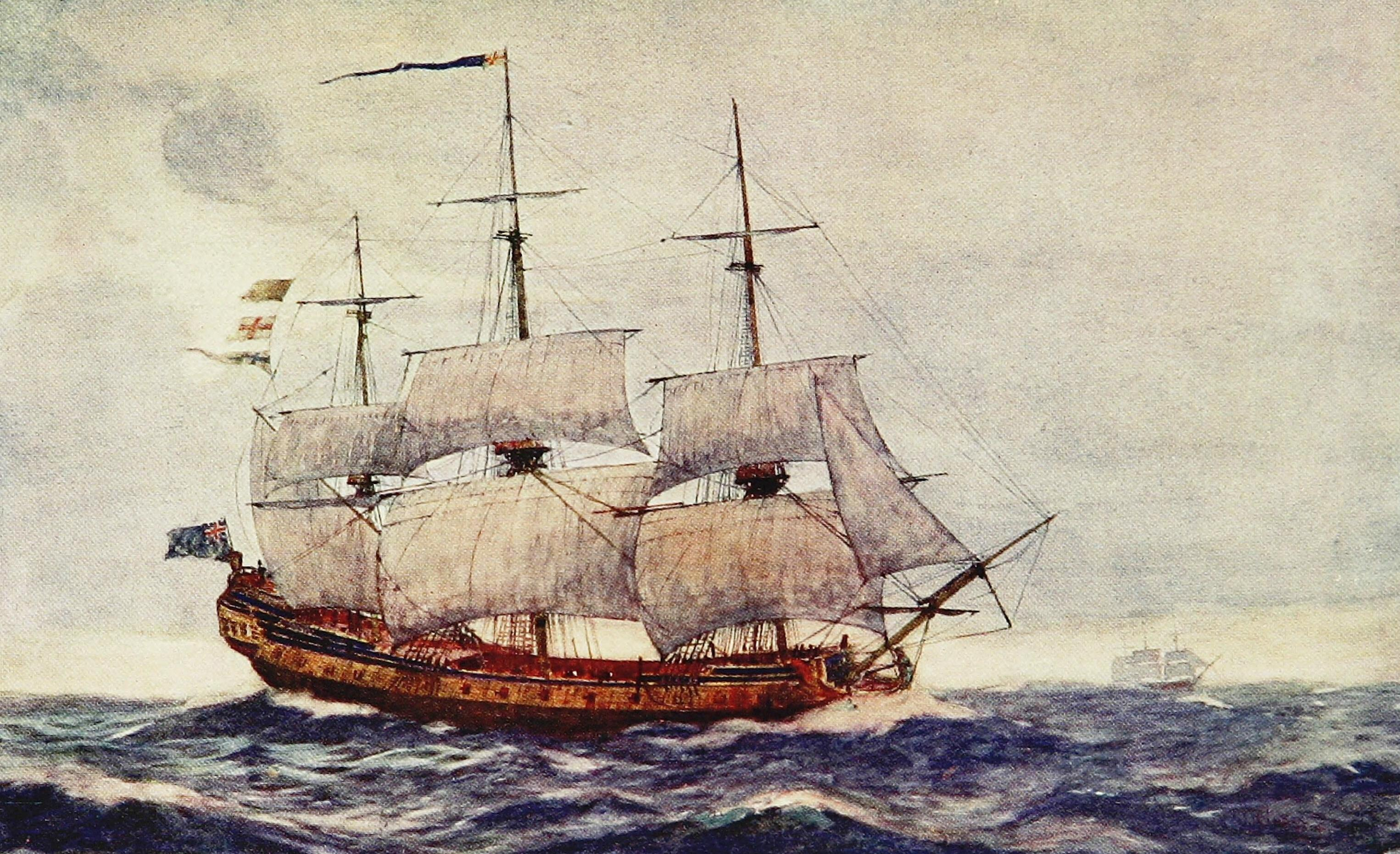
- 1907 illustration of Juno

History

Great Britain
- Name: HMS Juno
- Ordered: 1 June 1756
- Builder: William Alexander, Rotherhithe
- Laid down: June 1756
- Launched: 29 September 1757
- Completed: 6 November 1757 at Deptford Dockyard
- Commissioned: September 1757
- Fate: Burnt to avoid capture and scuttled off Rhode Island, 5 August 1778

General characteristics
- Class & type: Richmond-class fifth-rate frigate
- Tons burthen: 667 67/94 bm
- Length: 127 ft 10 in (38.96 m) (gundeck); 107 ft 0.125 in (32.61678 m) (keel)
- Beam: 34 ft 3 in (10.44 m)
- Depth of hold: 11 ft 10 in (3.61 m)
- Sail plan: Full-rigged ship
- Complement: 210 officers and men
- Armament: 32 guns comprising; Upperdeck: 26 × 12-pounder guns; Quarterdeck: 4 × 6-pounder guns; Forecastle: 2 × 6-pounder guns

HMS Juno was a 32-gun Richmond-class fifth-rate frigate of the Royal Navy. She was launched in 1757 and served throughout the American Revolutionary War until scuttled in 1778 to avoid capture. On 5 June, 1777 she, HMS Juno, and HMS Orpheus recaptured privateer brig "Lucy" 15 Leagues off Nantucket. On 9 July, 1777 she captured Betsy in Boston Bay. On 9 January, 1778 she captured French snow David 3-4 miles off the north east tip of Block Island. She engaged USS Providence during Providence's escape from Providence, Rhode Island 30 April 1778.
