= HMS Cerberus (1758) =

Coventry-class Royal Navy frigate

- Cerberus

History

Great Britain
- Name: HMS Cerberus
- Namesake: Cerberus
- Ordered: 6 May 1757
- Builder: Pleasant Fenn, East Cowes
- Laid down: 13 June 1757
- Launched: 5 September 1758
- Completed: 11 November 1758 at Portsmouth Dockyard
- Decommissioned: May 1758
- Fate: Abandoned and burnt to prevent capture at Rhode Island on 5 August 1778

General characteristics
- Class & type: 28-gun Coventry-class sixth-rate frigate
- Tons burthen: 593 14/94 bm
- Length: 118 ft 7.5 in (36.157 m) (gundeck); 97 ft 2.125 in (29.61958 m) (keel)
- Beam: 33 ft 10.5 in (10.325 m)
- Depth of hold: 10 ft 6 in (3.20 m)
- Sail plan: Full-rigged ship
- Complement: 200
- Armament: Upper deck: 24 × 9-pounder guns; Quarterdeck: 4 × 3-pounder guns; 12 × ½-pdr swivels

HMS Cerberus was a 28 gun sixth-rate frigate of the Royal Navy.

== Construction ==
She was ordered on 6 May 1757 from the yards of Pleasant Fenn, East Cowes and was laid down on 13 June 1757. She was launched just over a year later on 5 September 1758.

The frigate was named after Cerberus, the multi-headed dog from Greek mythology that reputedly guarded the doors to Hades. The choice of name followed a trend initiated in 1748 by John Montagu, 4th Earl of Sandwich, in his capacity as First Lord of the Admiralty, of using figures from classical antiquity as descriptors for naval vessels. A total of six Coventry-class vessels were named in this manner; a further ten were named after geographic features including regions, English or Irish rivers, or towns. (Note: The three exceptions to these naming conventions were Hussar, Active and the final vessel in the class, Hind)

In sailing qualities Cerberus was broadly comparable with French frigates of equivalent size, but with a shorter and sturdier hull and greater weight in her broadside guns. She was also comparatively broad-beamed with ample space for provisions and the ship's mess, and incorporating a large magazine for powder and round shot. (Note: Cerberus' dimensional ratios 3.57:1 in length to breadth, and 3.3:1 in breadth to depth, compare with standard French equivalents of up to 3.8:1 and 3:1 respectively. Royal Navy vessels of equivalent size and design to Cerberus were capable of carrying up to 20 tons of powder and shot, compared with a standard French capacity of around 10 tons. They also carried greater stores of rigging, spars, sails and cables, but had fewer ship's boats and less space for the possessions of the crew.) Taken together, these characteristics would enable Cerberus to remain at sea for long periods without resupply. She was also built with broad and heavy masts, which balanced the weight of her hull, improved stability in rough weather and made her capable of carrying a greater quantity of sail. The disadvantages of this comparatively heavy design were a decline in manoeuvrability and slower speed when sailing in light winds.

Her designated complement was 200, comprising two commissioned officers – a captain and a lieutenant – overseeing 40 warrant and petty officers, 91 naval ratings, 38 Marines and 29 servants and other ranks. (Note: The 29 servants and other ranks provided for in the ship's complement consisted of 20 personal servants and clerical staff, four assistant carpenters an assistant sailmaker and four widow's men. Unlike naval ratings, servants and other ranks took no part in the sailing or handling of the ship.) Among these other ranks were four positions reserved for widow's men – fictitious crew members whose pay was intended to be reallocated to the families of sailors who died at sea.

== Naval career ==
Cerberus's tender being destroyed on 13 August 1777

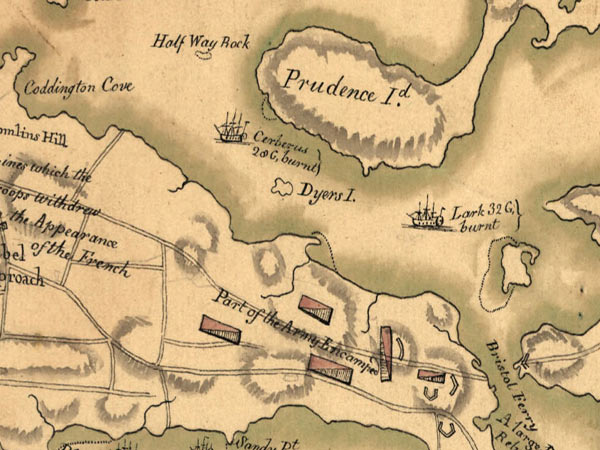
Map of the wreck of Cerberus

Cerberus saw action in the American Revolutionary War. One of its first duties was to dispatch generals William Howe, Henry Clinton, and John Burgoyne to Boston after the Battles of Lexington and Concord. The American press likened the three generals to the three-headed dog that was the ship's namesake. It provided naval reinforcement at the Battle of Bunker Hill. The ship was the target of an early torpedo attack by David Bushnell's newly developed powder keg torpedoes in 1777. On 13 August 1777 a Bushnell floating mine sank a small captured schooner which was serving a ship's tender to Cerberus in Black Point Bay, killing three of the four sailors aboard.

Cerberus was eventually scuttled by burning to prevent being captured by the French on 5 August 1778 during the American War of Independence, in Narragansett Bay in Rhode Island. The remains of the Cerberus are now part of a site listed on the National Register of Historic Places, the "Wreck Sites of HMS Cerberus and HMS Lark."
