= Mackay River =

River in the state of Georgia, United States of America

- Location of mouth

Location
- Country: United States
- State: Georgia

Physical characteristics
- Source
  - location: Georgia
- Mouth
  - coordinates: 31°09′26″N 81°25′48″W
- Length: 13.4 mi (21.6 km)

The Mackay River is a 13.4-mile-long (21.6 km) tidal river in Glynn County, Georgia. It flows between Saint Simons Island to the east and the mainland, including the city of Brunswick, to the west, and connects to Buttermilk Sound at its north end and St. Simons Sound and the Brunswick River at its south end. It runs parallel to and west of the Frederica River. The Mackay River is crossed by the F.J. Torras Causeway traveling between Brunswick and Saint Simons. It is part of the Intracoastal Waterway.

The river most likely was named after Captain James Mackay, a pioneer citizen.

== See also ==
- List of rivers of Georgia
