= F.J. Torras Causeway =

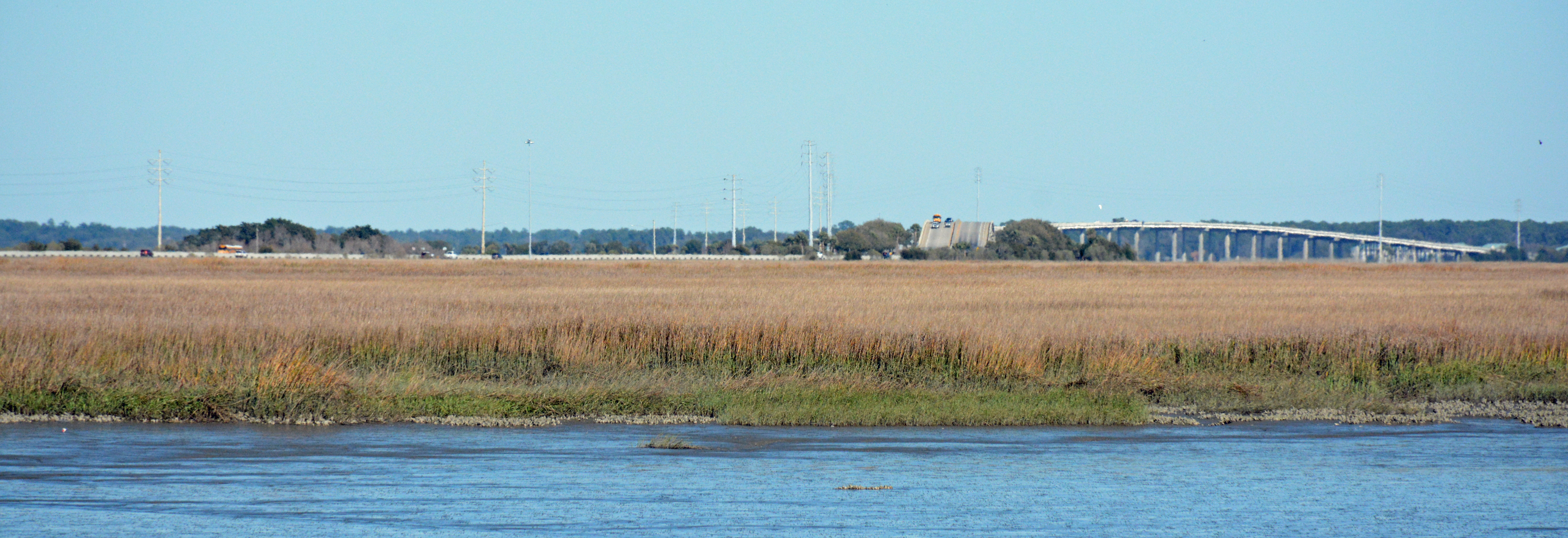
- Part of the FJ Torras Causeway, viewed from Brunswick, over the Marshes of Glynn. St. Simons is in the distance.
- Coordinates: 31°09′58″N 81°26′33″W
- Carries: 4 lanes of SR 25 Spur
- Crosses: Dupree Creek, Back River, Little River, Mackay River, Intracoastal Waterway (east to west)
- Locale: Glynn County, Georgia
- Other name: St. Simons Causeway
- Named for: Fernando Joseph Torras

Characteristics
- Total length: 4.2 miles (6.8 km)
- No. of lanes: 4

History
- Opened: 1924
- Rebuilt: 1949–50

Location
- Interactive map of F.J. Torras Causeway

F.J. Torras Causeway is a causeway located in Glynn County, Georgia, USA that connects the city of Brunswick, Georgia to St. Simons Island, Georgia.

== Route description ==
F.J. Torras Causeway is a four-lane paved road, with a concrete barrier in the center to separate the traffic lanes and a speed limit of 50 miles per hour for most of its length. The causeway begins its journey toward St. Simons in Brunswick, branching off of US Highway 17. It travels approximately 4.2 miles over a salt marsh and a series of five tidal rivers (west to east): a branch of Terry Creek/Dupree Creek, the Back River, the Little River, the Mackay River (part of the Intracoastal Waterway), and the Frederica River. It terminates on Gascoigne Bluff on the western edge of St. Simons Island. The Torras Causeway is recognized as a state highway, yet it has never been signed as such. Its official highway designation is Georgia State Route 25 Spur E (SR 25 Spur E}.

== History ==
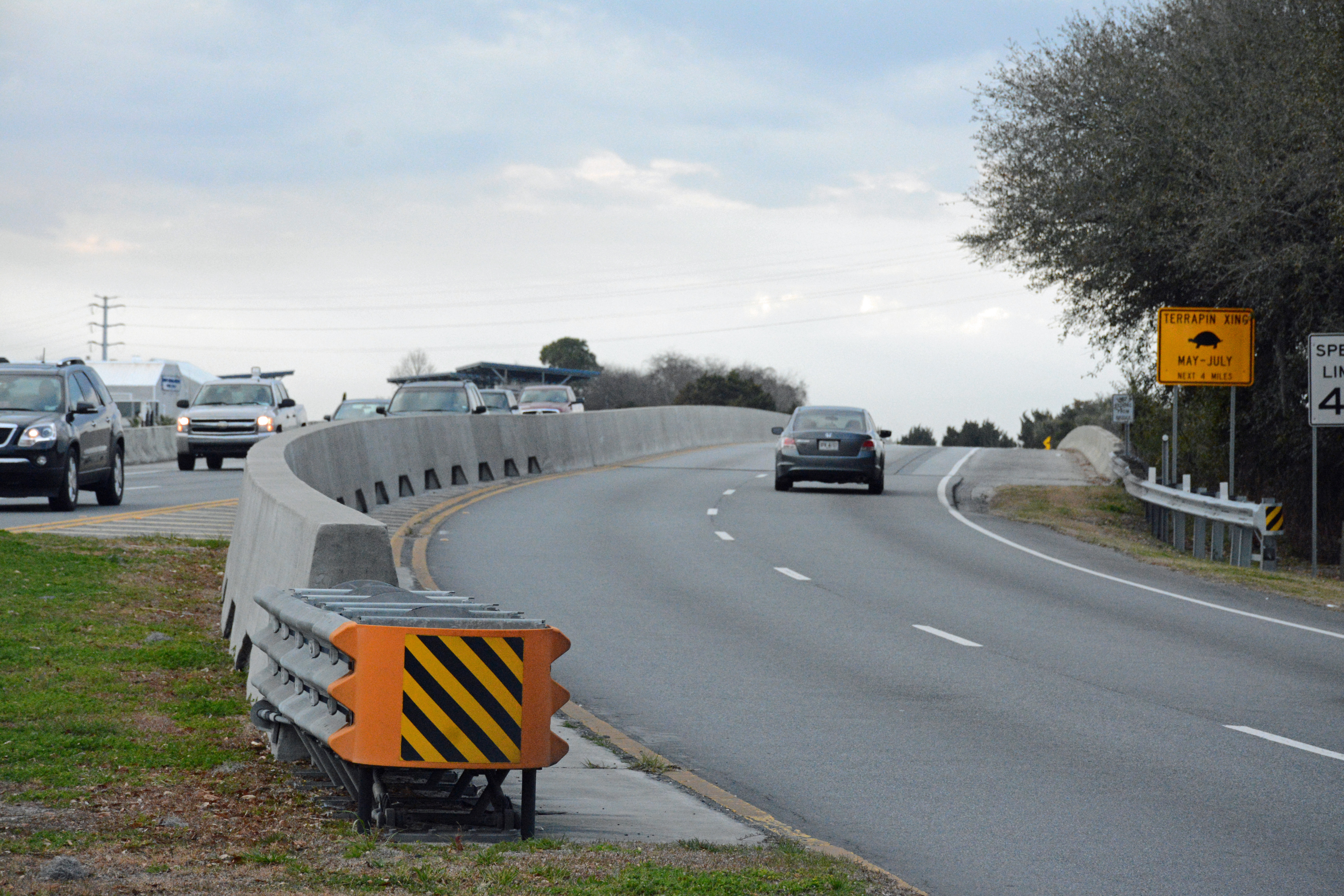
The end of the F.J. Torras causeway at St. Simons Island. Openings in the barrier for turtle crossing are visible.

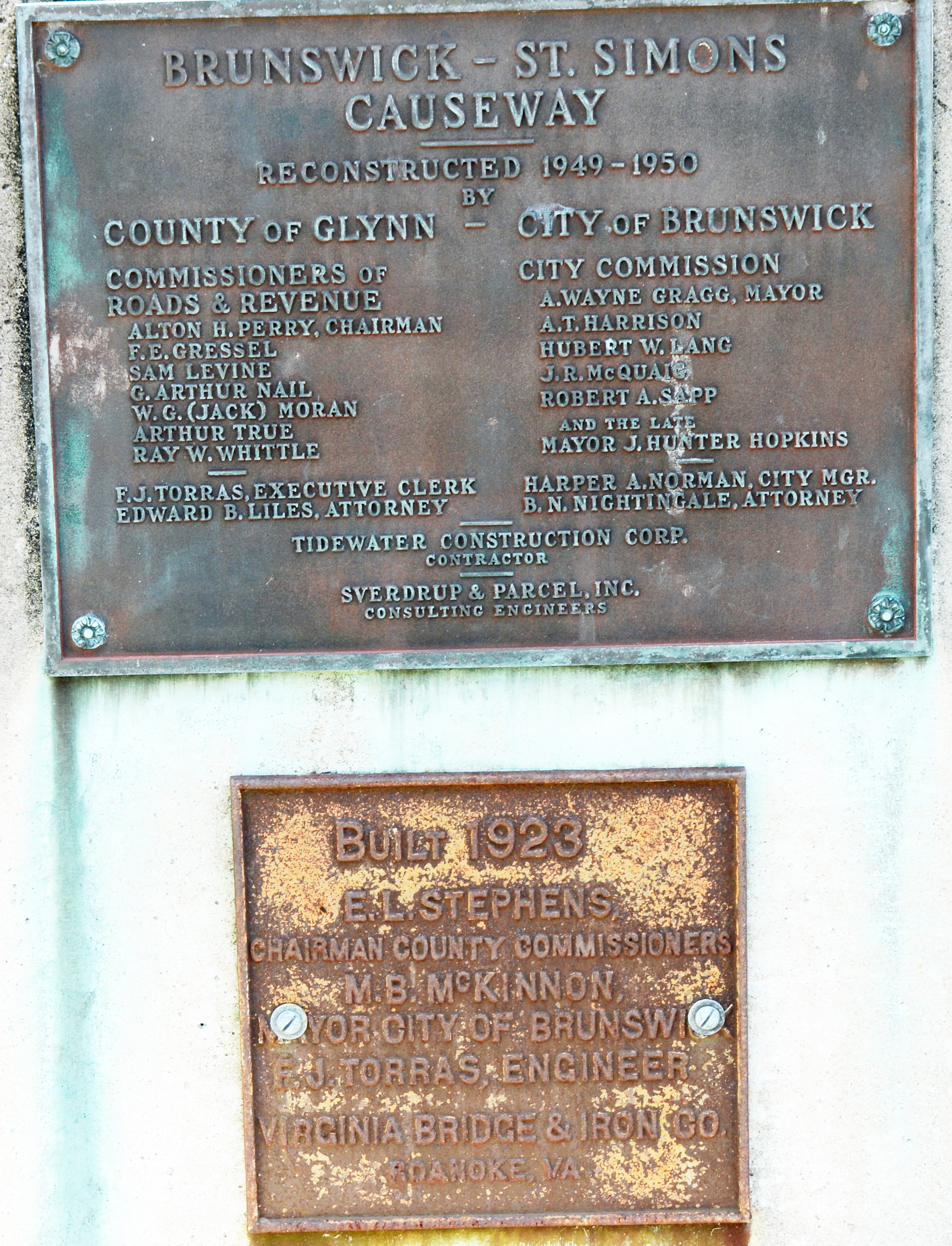
Sign on the Brunswick end

F.J. Torras Causeway is named for Fernando Joseph Torras (1885–1952), the causeway's main engineer who served as Brunswick's city manager for over 30 years.

Prior to the construction of the Torras Causeway, the only way to reach St. Simons Island was by a ferry that left from a dock in Brunswick and arrived at a pier on the southern tip of the island. The trip to St. Simons took about an hour by ferry, and the people of Brunswick spoke for years about building a causeway for automobiles. An attempt was once made a few miles north of Brunswick, but it was abandoned. Another survey had been made which would have extended Cypress Mill Road in Brunswick across the marsh, making contact with St. Simons at present-day Fort Frederica National Monument, but the task of building a causeway to St. Simons was deemed to be impossible.

Fernando Torras, who graduated as an engineer from Georgia Tech and had built rail lines, bridges, and roads in the jungles of South America, took a keen interest in the idea of a causeway. He conducted a survey of the marshy landscape at the request of Brunswick mayor Malcolm B. McKinnon and determined the best possible route. Torras served as the chief engineer on the project. The causeway was completed in 1924 after 13 months of work at a cost of more than $418,000 (approximately $7.85 million, adjusted for inflation).

The new causeway was an immediate sensation for all of Glynn County. On the day that it opened, 5,500 cars crossed over to St. Simons, and 7,500 people were fed a fish dinner under some live oak trees. There was also a parade on Gloucester Street in Brunswick with floats that celebrated the opening of the causeway.

As Fernando Torras was the main catalyst to imagine and create the causeway, in January 1953 (a year after he died and 29 years after it opened) the causeway was named for him.

The causeway was reconstructed in 1949–50. In the mid-1980s, the causeway was widened from two to four lanes to accommodate the increase in traffic. The five bridges had to be rebuilt and reconstructed to carry four lanes of traffic.

=== Toll ===
A $0.25 toll was once collected from the drawbridge span on one of the two lift-span bridges on the causeway. A green tin toll collectors booth hung out over the water and cars would either stop and pay the toll to the attendant or be waved through if they displayed a round yearly sticker on their windshield. A new multi-lane toll plaza was constructed in the early 1980s about halfway onto the causeway and toll was increased to $0.35. The toll was removed in 2003, but part of the toll booth remained in place to serve as a security post during the 30th G8 summit held on Sea Island in 2004, which is also reached by the Torras Causeway. The structure was entirely removed in 2006. The only remaining landmark is a tall streetlight which once illuminated the toll plaza area.

== Recreation ==
Aside from being the only road to and from St. Simons, Torras Causeway provides several opportunities for recreation. A paved biking and walking path runs the 4.2-mile (6.8 km) length of the causeway, allowing a view of the expansive salt marsh, rivers, and wildlife of the "Marshes of Glynn". Fishing and crabbing from several of the bridges is also a common pastime for locals.

== Center median barrier ==
Construction of a concrete center median barrier began in March 2011. Local and state officials had expressed the need for a barrier due to the number of head-on collisions that were occurring on the causeway in recent years, the most recent in March 2008. The need, purpose, design, and cost of the concrete barrier was a controversial issue among Glynn county residents and county officials. The barrier has openings to allow turtles to cross the causeway. It was completed in late 2011.
