= St. Simons, Georgia =

St. Simons Island, Georgia
- Unincorporated community Census-designated place
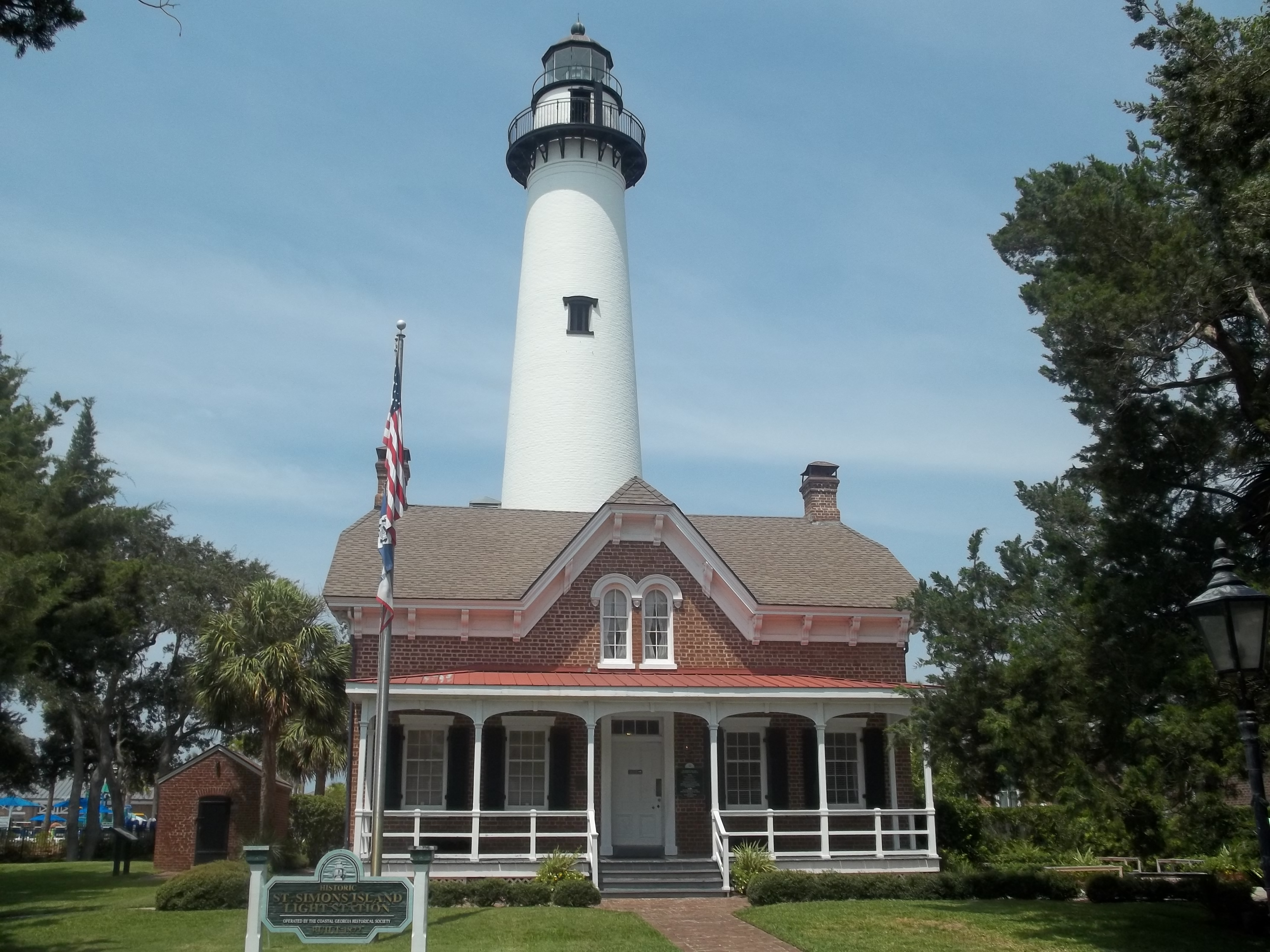
- St. Simons Island Light
- Interactive map of St. Simons
- Coordinates: 31°9′35″N 81°23′19″W
- Country: United States
- State: Georgia
- County: Glynn

Area
  - Total: 17.51 sq mi (45.34 km^{2})
  - Land: 16.48 sq mi (42.69 km^{2})
  - Water: 1.02 sq mi (2.65 km^{2})
- Elevation: 9.8 ft (3 m)

Population (2020)
  - Total: 14,982
  - Density: 909.0/sq mi (350.95/km^{2})
- Time zone: UTC−5 (Eastern (EST))
  - Summer (DST): UTC−4 (EDT)
- Zip Code: 31522
- Area code: 912
- FIPS code: 13-68040
- GNIS feature ID: 0322308

St. Simons Island (SSI or just St. Simons) is a barrier island and census-designated place (CDP) located on St. Simons Island in Glynn County, Georgia, United States. The names of the community and the island are interchangeable, known simply as "St. Simons Island" or "SSI", or locally as "The Island". St. Simons is part of the Brunswick metropolitan statistical area, and according to the 2020 U.S. census, the CDP had a population of 14,982. Located on the southeast Georgia coast, midway between Savannah and Jacksonville, St. Simons Island is both a seaside resort and residential community. It is the largest of Georgia's Golden Isles (along with Sea Island, Jekyll Island, and privately owned Little St. Simons Island). Visitors are drawn to the island for its warm climate, beaches, variety of outdoor activities, shops and restaurants, historical sites, and natural environment.

In addition to its base of permanent residents, the island enjoys an influx of visitors and part-time residents throughout the year. The 2010 Census noted that 26.8% of total housing units were for "seasonal, recreational, or occasional use". The vast majority of commercial and residential development is located on the southern half of the island; much of the northern half remains marsh or woodland. A large tract of land in the northeast has been converted to a nature preserve containing trails, historical ruins, and an undisturbed maritime forest. The tract, Cannon's Point Preserve, is open to the public on specified days and hours.

Originally inhabited by the Muscogee, the Spanish, British and French contested the area of South Georgia which included St. Simons Island. After establishing the Province of Georgia in 1732, Anglo-American colonists established rice and cotton plantations worked by African slaves, who created the unique Gullah culture that survives to this day. The primary mode of travel to the island is by automobile via F.J. Torras Causeway. Malcolm McKinnon Airport (IATA: SSI) serves general aviation on the island.

== History ==
=== Pre-European contact ===
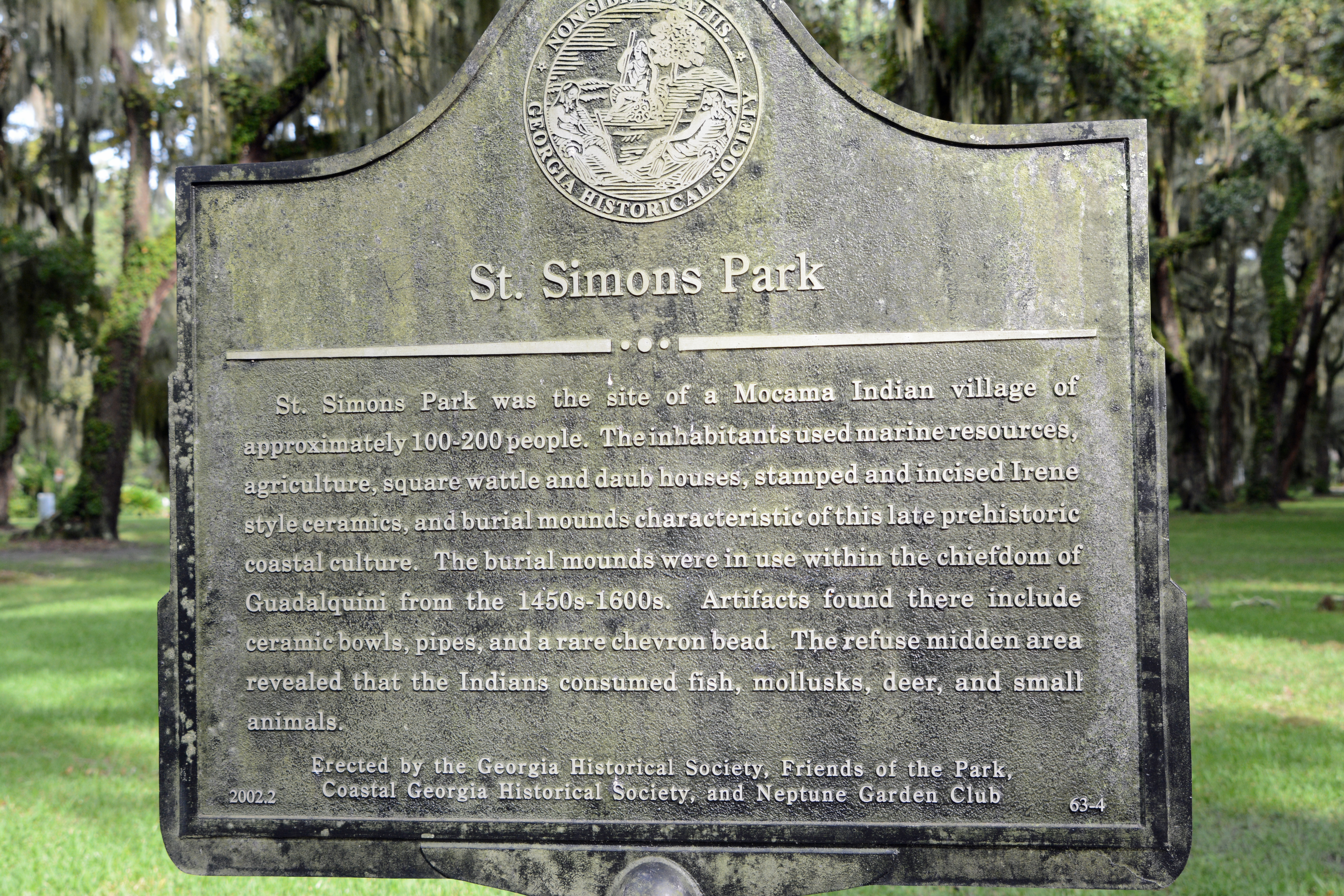
St. Simons Park marker

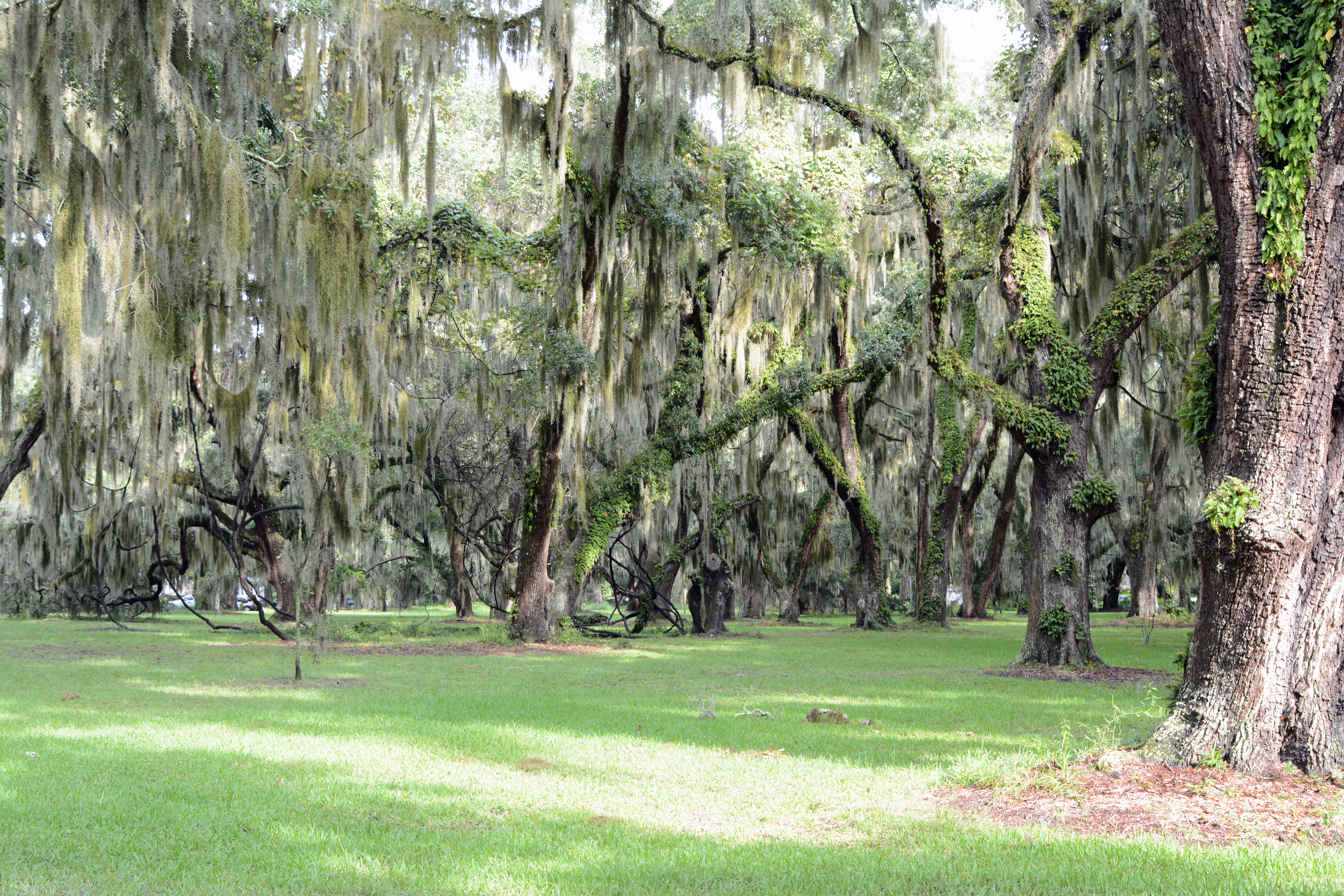
St. Simons Park

Cannon's Point, on the north end of St. Simons Island, is an archaeological site that includes a Late Archaic shell ring. The Cannon's Point site has yielded evidence of occupation by Native Americans since at least as early as the appearance of ceramics in the southeastern United States. Milanich lists the succession of periods at Cannon's Point as: Sapelo Period (2500–1000 BC); ceramics related to those of the Stallings culture of the Savannah River valley and Orange period of northern Florida; Refuge Period (1000–500 BC); Deptford Periods (500 BC to AD 700); Wilmington Period (700–1000); St. Catherine's Period (1000–1250); Savannah Periods (1250–1540); Pine Harbor Period (1540–1625), where European artifacts appear in the archaeological record in this period; and Sutherland Bluff Period (1625–1680), where Native American occupation of Cannon's Point seems to have ended during this period.

Many scholars in the early 20th century identified the people of St. Simons Island as Guale. Hann cites evidence that the people of St. Simons, at least as early as 1580, were part of the Mocama people. Ashley et al. suggest that St. Simons may have been occupied by the Guale people when Europeans arrived in southeastern Georgia in the 16th century and that the original Guale population on St. Simons was displaced from at least the southern part of the island after the Guale rebellion of 1597, and replaced by Timucua speaking Mocama people.

=== Spanish mission of San Buenaventura de Guadalquini ===
The mission of San Buenaventura de Guadalquini was established on the southern end of St. Simons sometime between 1597 and 1609 (probably near the present-day St. Simons Island Light) and was the northernmost mission in the Mocama area. The Timucua language name for St. Simons Island was Guadalquini. The Spanish called it Isla de Ballenas (Isle of Whales). Some Spanish documents called the island Boadalquivi.

Raiders from the Chichimecos (the Spanish name for Westos), Uchise (the Spanish name for Muscogee), and Chiluque (a name the Spanish used for a faction of the Mocamo and for Yamassee) and possibly other nations, aided and supported by the English in the Province of Carolina, attacked Colon (also called San Simon) a village of un-Christianized Yamasee to the north of San Buenaventura on St. Simons Island in 1680. A force of Spanish soldiers and Native Americans from San Buenaventura went to the aid of Colon, forcing the raiders to withdraw.

In 1683, St. Augustine was attacked by a pirate fleet, and in 1684 missions along what is now the Georgia coast were attacked by Native American allies of the English. The mission of San Buenaventura was ordered to move south and merge with the mission of San Juan del Puerto on the St. Johns River. Before the mission could be moved, pirates returned to the area in the second half of 1684. On hearing of the presence of the pirates, Lorenzo de Santiago, chief of San Buenaventura, moved the people of his village, along with most of their property and stored maize, to the mainland. When the pirates landed at San Buenaventura, they found only ten men under a sub-chief who had been left to guard the village. The San Buenaventura men withdrew to the woods, and the pirates burned the village and mission. After the pirates burned the mission, the people of Guadalquini moved to a site about one league west of San Juan del Puerto on the St. Johns River, where a new mission named Santa Cruz de Guadalquini was established.

=== Fort Frederica ===
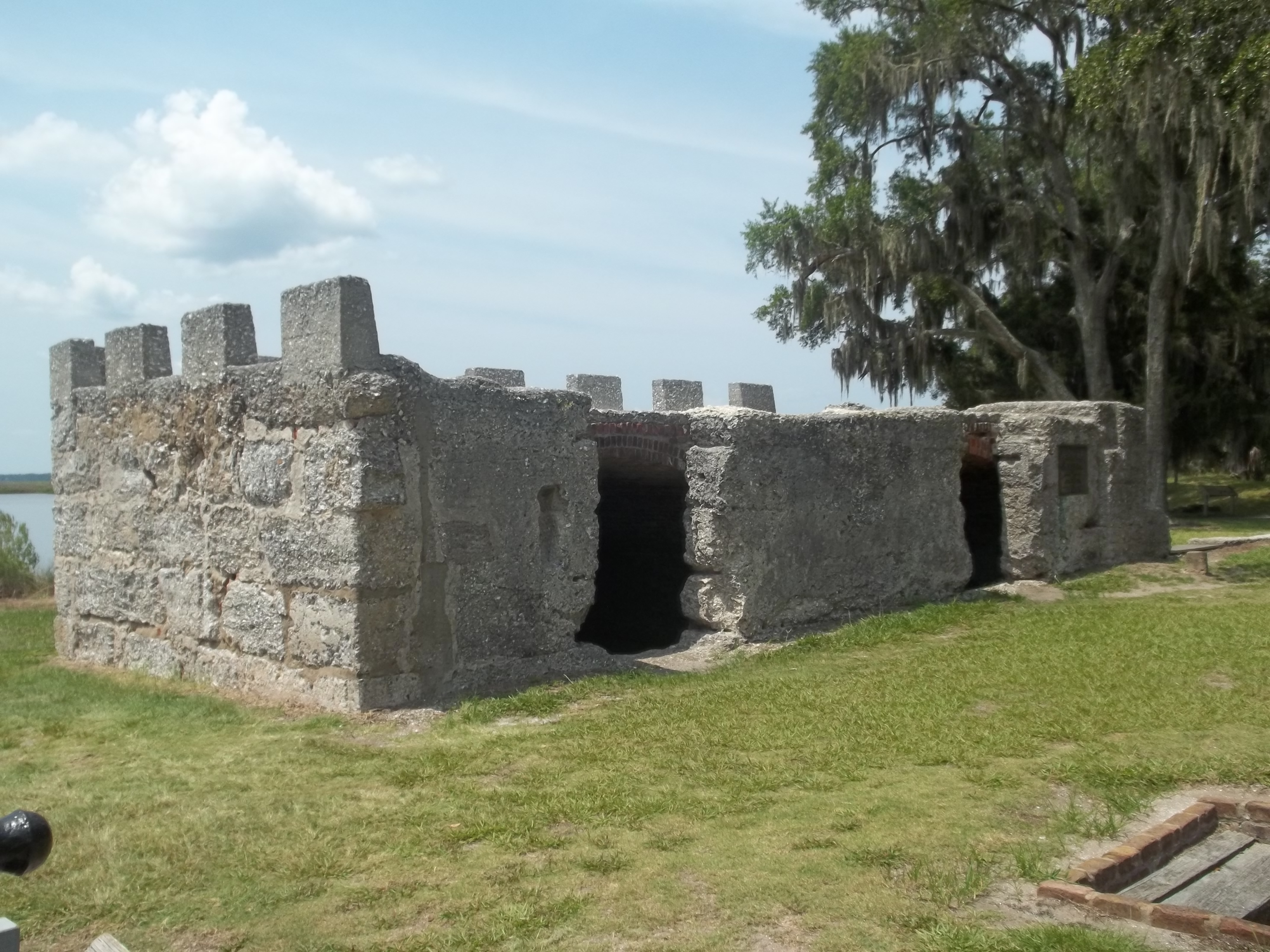
Remains of Fort Frederica

Fort Frederica, now Fort Frederica National Monument, was built beginning in 1736 as the military headquarters of the Province of Georgia during the early English colonial period. It served as a buffer against Spanish incursion from Florida.

Nearby is the site of the Battle of Gully Hole Creek and Battle of Bloody Marsh, where on July 7, 1742, the British ambushed Spanish troops marching single file through the marsh and routed them from the island. This marked the end of the Spanish efforts to invade Georgia during the War of Jenkins' Ear.

It was preserved in the 20th century and identified as a national historic site largely by the efforts of Margaret Davis Cates, a resident who contributed much to historic preservation. She helped raise more than $100,000 (~$1.64 million in 2024) in 1941 to buy the site of the fort and conduct stabilization and some preservation. It was designated as a National Monument in 1947.

=== Wesley brothers ===
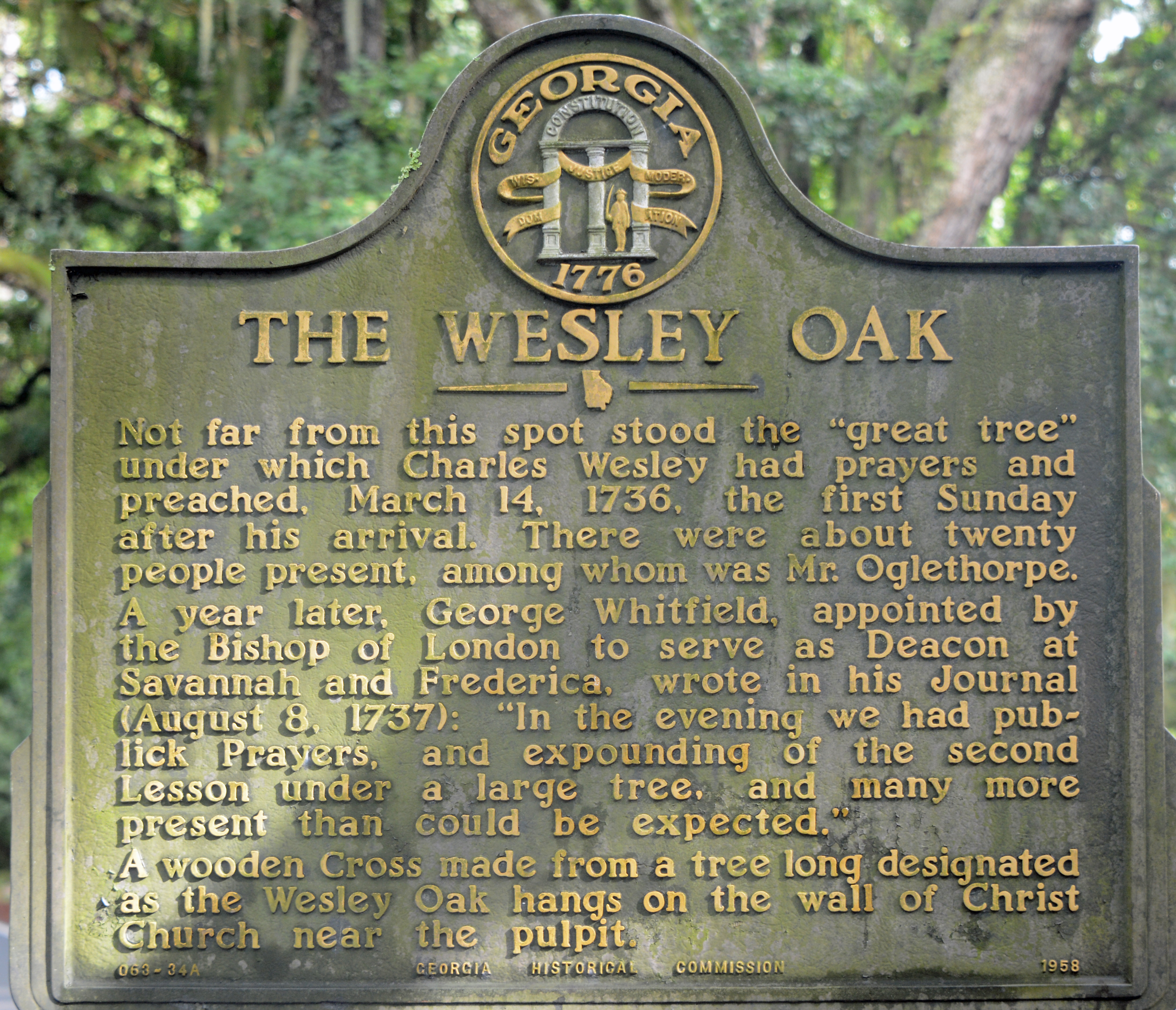
Historical marker about the Wesley Oak

In the 1730s, St. Simons served as a sometime home to John Wesley, the young minister of the colony at Savannah. He later returned to England, where in 1738, he founded the evangelical movement of Methodism within the Anglican Church. Wesley performed missionary work at St. Simons but was despondent about failing to bring about conversions. (He wrote that the local inhabitants had more tortures from their environment than he could describe for Hell). In the 1730s, John Wesley's brother Charles Wesley also did missionary work on St. Simons. In the late eighteenth century, Methodist preachers traveled throughout Georgia as part of the Great Awakening, a religious revival movement led by Methodists and Baptists. A significant impact of the revival was to convert enslaved African-Americans in Georgia (as well as those in the rest of the Thirteen Colonies) to Christianity.

On April 5, 1987, fifty-five St. Simons United Methodist Church members were commissioned, with Bishop Frank Robertson as the first pastor, to begin a new church on the north end of St. Simons Island. This was where John and Charles Wesley had preached and ministered to the people at Fort Frederica. The new church was named Wesley United Methodist Church at Frederica.

=== American Revolution ===
In 1778 Colonel Samuel Elbert commanded Georgia's Continental Army and Navy. On April 15, he learned that four British vessels (the naval vessels HMS Galatea and HMS Hinchinbrook, and the hired vessels Rebecca and Hatter) from East Florida were sailing in St. Simons Sound. Elbert commanded about 360 troops from the Georgia Continental Battalions at Fort Howe to march to Darien, Georgia. There they boarded three Georgia Navy galleys: Washington, commanded by Captain John Hardy; Lee, commanded by Captain John Cutler Braddock; and Bulloch, commanded by Captain Archibald Hatcher.

On April 18, they entered Frederica River and anchored about 1.5 miles (2.4 km) from Fort Frederica. The next day the galleys attacked the British vessels. The Colonial ships were armed with heavier cannons than the British, and the galleys also had a shallow draft and could be rowed. When the wind died down, the British ships had difficulty maneuvering in the restricted waters of the river and sound. Two British ships ran aground, and the crews escaped to their other ships. The battle showed the effectiveness of the galleys in restricted waters over ships designed for the open sea. The victory in the Frederica naval action boosted the morale of the colonials in Georgia.

=== Cotton production ===
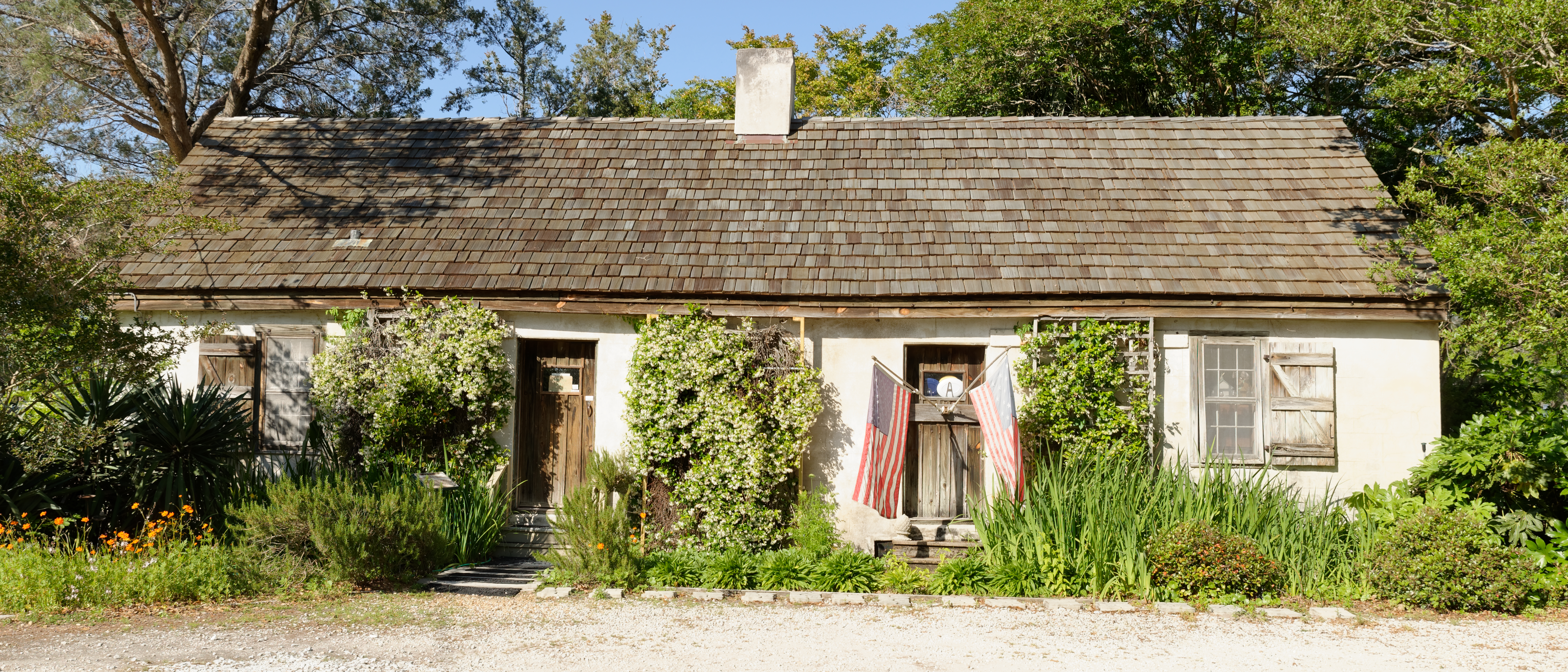
Slave cabin built in 1805, now called the Tabby House

During the plantation era, St. Simons became a center of cotton production, known for its long-fiber Sea Island Cotton. Nearly the entire island was cleared of trees to make way for several large cotton plantations worked by enslaved Geechee people and their descendants. The plantations of this and other Sea Islands were large, and often the owners stayed on the mainland in Darien and other towns, especially during the summers, because the island was considered swampland. Still, enslaved Geechee people lived on the island and were not allowed to come to the mainland unless accompanied by an enslaver. This season was considered bad for diseases in the lowlands. These enslaved people were held in smaller groups and interacted more with whites. They were also confused with the Gullah tribe from South Carolina. An original slave cabin still stands at the intersection of Demere Road and Frederica Road at the roundabout.

=== American Civil War and its aftermath ===
During the early stages of the war, Confederate troops occupied St. Simons Island to protect its strategic location at the entrance to Brunswick harbor. However, in 1862, Robert E. Lee ordered an evacuation of the island to relocate the soldiers for the defense of Savannah, Georgia. Before departing, they destroyed the lighthouse to prevent its use as a navigation aid by U.S. Navy forces. Most property owners then retreated inland with the people they enslaved, and the U.S. Army occupied the island for the remainder of the war.

Postwar, the island plantations were in ruins, and landowners found it financially unfeasible to cultivate cotton or rice. Most moved inland to pursue other occupations, and the island's economy remained dormant for several years. Formerly enslaved people established a community in the center of the island known as Harrington.

=== Since Reconstruction ===
St. Simons' first exports of lumber occurred after the Naval Act of 1794 when timber harvested from two thousand Southern live oak trees from Gascoigne Bluff was used to build the USS Constitution and five other frigates (see six original United States frigates). The USS Constitution is known as "Old Ironsides", as cannonballs bounced off its hard live oak planking.

The second phase of lumber production on the island began in the late 1870s when mills were constructed in the area surrounding Gascoigne Bluff. The mills supported a vibrant community that lasted until just after the turn of the twentieth century. During this time, lumber from St. Simons was shipped to New York City for use in the construction of the Brooklyn Bridge.

In contrast to the post-Civil War era, the decline of lumber did not open a new period of economic hardship; for a new industry was taking hold on St. Simons Island. As early as the 1870s, summer cottages were being constructed on the island's south end, and a small village was forming to serve them. Construction of the pier in 1887 brought visitors by boat from Brunswick and south Georgia. The Hotel St. Simons, on the present site of Massengale Park, opened in 1888. About a decade later, two hotels were built near the pier. The arrival of the automobile and the opening of the Torras Causeway in 1924 ensured the continued growth of tourism on St. Simons, the only one of the Golden Isles not privately held. New hotels were built, roads were constructed, and tourism became the dominant force in the island's economy.

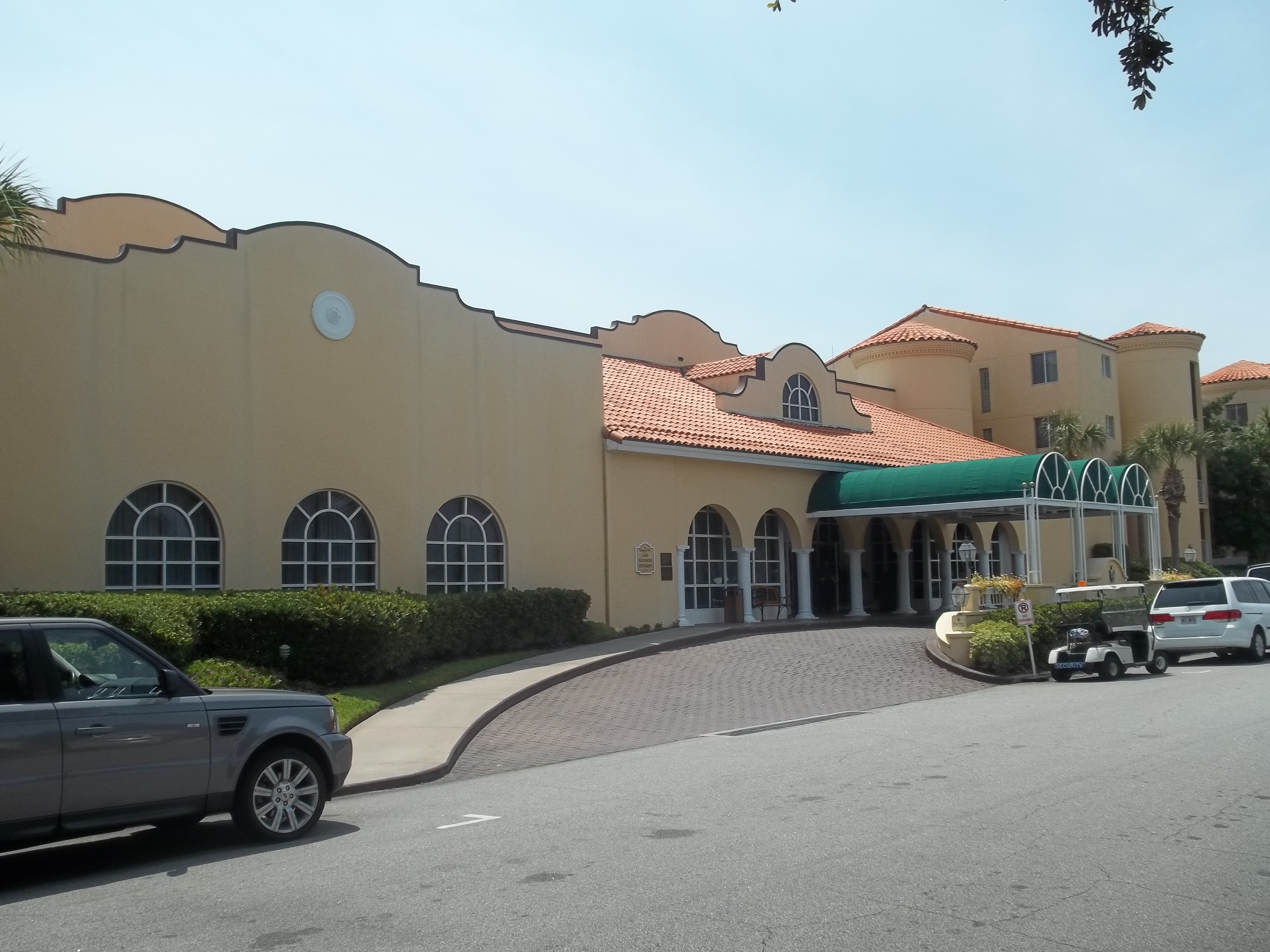
King and Prince Hotel

On April 8, 1942, a German U-boat sank two oil tankers in the middle of the night. The blasts shattered windows as far away as Brunswick, and unsubstantiated rumors spread about German soldiers landing on the beaches. Security measures were tightened after the sinkings, and anti-submarine patrols from Glynco Naval Air Station in Brunswick ultimately ended the U-boat threat. During the war, McKinnon Airport became Naval Air Station St. Simons, home to the Navy Radar Training School. The King and Prince Hotel, built in 1941, was used as a training facility and radar station. It was listed on the U.S. National Register of Historic Places in 2005.

President Jimmy Carter visited the island with his brother Billy Carter in 1977, arriving by Marine One.

During the postwar years, as resort and vacation travel increased, permanent residential development began to take place on St. Simons Island and surrounding mainland communities. The island's population grew from 1,706 in 1950 to 13,381 by 2000.

== Geography ==
St. Simons Island

Climate chart (precipitation, max. and min. temperature)
J	F	M	A	M	J	J	A	S	O	N	D
3.2 61 43	3.5 63 46	3.9 69 52	2.5 75 58	1.9 82 67	4.8 88 73	4.1 90 75	6.3 89 75	5.8 85 72	4.5 78 63	2 70 53	2.6 63 45
- █ Average max. and min. temperatures in °F
- █ Precipitation totals in inches
- Source: NOAA
Metric conversion
J	F	M	A	M	J	J	A	S	O	N	D
82 16 6	88 17 8	99 21 11	63 24 15	47 28 19	123 31 23	104 32 24	159 32 24	146 29 22	113 25 17	52 21 12	67 17 7
- █ Average max. and min. temperatures in °C
- █ Precipitation totals in mm

St. Simons Island is part of a cluster of barrier islands and marsh hammocks between the Altamaha River delta to the north, and St. Simons Sound to the south. Sea Island forms the eastern edge of this cluster, with Little St. Simons on the north and the marshes of Glynn plus the Intracoastal Waterway to the west.

St. Simons is located at 31°9′40″N 81°23′13″W (31.161250, -81.386875), midway between Savannah, Georgia and Jacksonville, Florida, and approximately 12 miles (19 km) east of Brunswick, Georgia, the sole municipality in Glynn County and the county government seat.

=== Climate ===
The Köppen Climate Classification System rates the climate of St. Simons Island as humid subtropical. Ocean breezes tend to moderate the island climate, as compared to the nearby mainland. Daytime mean highs in winter range from 61 to 68 °F (16 to 20 °C), with nighttime lows averaging 43 to 52 °F (6 to 11 °C). Summertime mean highs are 88 to 90 °F (31 to 32 °C), with average lows 73 to 75 °F (23 to 24 °C). The average rainfall is 45 inches per year. Rainfall is greatest in August and September when passing afternoon thunderstorms are typical. Accumulation of snow/ice is extremely rare. The last recorded snow on St. Simons was in 1989. The island is located in USDA Plant Hardiness Zone 9a.

According to the United States Census Bureau, the CDP has a total area of 17.7 square miles (46 km^{2}), 15.9 square miles (41 km^{2}) of which is land and 1.7 square miles (4.4 km^{2}) of it (10 percent) is water.

=== Ecology, vegetation, and wildlife ===
A diverse and complex ecology exists alongside residential and commercial development on St. Simons Island. The island shares many features common to the chain of sea islands along the southeastern U.S. coast, such as sandy beaches on the ocean side, marshes to the west, and maritime forests inland. Despite centuries of agriculture and development, a canopy of live oaks and other hardwoods draped in Spanish moss continues to shade much of the island. The abundance of food provided by the marshes, estuaries, and vegetation attracts various wildlife on the land, sea, and in the air.

Commonly sighted land and amphibious animals include white-tailed deer, marsh rabbits, raccoons, minks, alligators, armadillos, terrapins and frogs. Overhead, along the shore, and in the marshes, a wide variety of native and migratory shorebirds can be seen year-round. Species include sandpipers, plovers, terns, gulls, herons, egrets, hawks, ospreys, cormorants, white ibis, brown pelicans, and the southern bald eagle.

The area surrounding St. Simons Island and the Altamaha River delta is an important stopover for migrating shorebirds traveling between South America and their spawning grounds in the Canadian arctic. As a result of all this avian activity, Gould's Inlet and East Beach on St. Simons Island have designated stops on the Colonial Coast Birding Trail.

The waters off St. Simons Island are likewise home to a great variety of sea life, including dolphins, right whales, a wide diversity of gamefish, and the occasional manatee. On late spring and summer nights, loggerhead sea turtles arrive on the beach to lay their eggs. Area naturalists monitor and protect nests, and guided turtle walks are available. Shrimping is still important to the region, and shrimp boats are often seen just off the beaches.

Like most barrier islands, St. Simons Island beaches constantly shift as tides, wind, and storms move tons of sand annually. Along with umbrellas and folding chairs, beach-goers can encounter fast-moving ghost crabs, sand dollars, giant horseshoe crabs, and moving conch shells powered by resident hermit crabs. Sea oats and morning glories cover the dunes along East Beach. Jumping mullet and tiny bait fish populate the coastal waters. Dolphin sightings are common, particularly off the island's south coast.

=== Cannon's Point Preserve ===
In September 2012, following an 18-month fund-raising effort, the St. Simons Land Trust acquired a 608-acre tract of undeveloped land in the northeast portion of the island. The acreage includes maritime forest, salt marsh, tidal creek, and river shoreline, as well as ancient shell middens and remains of the John Couper plantation of the early 19th century.

The Preserve is open to the public on Saturdays, Sundays, and Mondays, 9 AM-3 PM, for hiking, bicycling, bird-watching, and picnicking. The Preserve also features a launch site for kayaks, canoes, and paddleboards and an observation tower at the north end.

== Demographics ==
Historical population
Census	Pop.	Note	%±
1950	1,706		—
1960	3,199		87.5%
1970	5,346		67.1%
1980	6,566		22.8%
1990	12,026		83.2%
2000	13,381		11.3%
2010	12,743		−4.8%
2020	14,982		17.6%
U.S. Decennial Census; 1850-1870 1870-1880; 1890-1910 1920-1930; 1940 1950 1960; 1970 1980 1990; 2000 2010 2020

St. Simons was first listed as an unincorporated place in the 1950 U.S. census and then designated a census designated place in 1980 United States census.

=== Racial and ethnic composition ===
St. Simons, Georgia – Racial and ethnic composition Note: the US Census treats Hispanic/Latino as an ethnic category. This table excludes Latinos from the racial categories and assigns them to a separate category. Hispanics/Latinos may be of any race.
Race / Ethnicity (NH = Non-Hispanic)	Pop 2000	Pop 2010	Pop 2020	% 2000	% 2010	% 2020
White alone (NH)	14,426	11,889	13,709	92.86%	93.30%	91.50%
Black or African American alone (NH)	486	338	288	3.63%	2.66%	1.92%
Native American or Alaska Native alone (NH)	16	17	19	0.12%	0.13%	0.13%
Asian alone (NH)	123	117	112	0.92%	0.92%	0.75%
Pacific Islander alone (NH)	2	2	4	0.01%	0.02%	0.03%
Other race alone (NH)	3	18	54	0.02%	0.14%	0.36%
Mixed race or Multiracial (NH)	72	77	346	0.54%	0.60%	2.31%
Hispanic or Latino (any race)	253	284	450	1.89%	2.23%	3.00%
Total	13,381	12,743	14,982	100.00%	100.00%	100.00%

=== 2020 census ===
As of the 2020 census, St. Simons had a population of 14,982. The median age was 56.1 years. 14.5% of residents were under the age of 18 and 34.8% of residents were 65 years of age or older. For every 100 females there were 85.1 males, and for every 100 females age 18 and over there were 82.0 males age 18 and over.

94.1% of residents lived in urban areas, while 5.9% lived in rural areas.

There were 7,121 households in St. Simons, including 4,346 families, of which 18.3% had children under the age of 18 living in them. Of all households, 54.0% were married-couple households, 12.9% were households with a male householder and no spouse or partner present, and 29.5% were households with a female householder and no spouse or partner present. About 31.3% of all households were made up of individuals and 17.9% had someone living alone who was 65 years of age or older.

There were 10,741 housing units, of which 33.7% were vacant. The homeowner vacancy rate was 3.2% and the rental vacancy rate was 30.8%.

=== 2010 census ===
According to the census of 2010, there were 12,743 people, 6,117 households, and 3,637 families residing in the CDP, occupying a land area of 15.94 square miles (41.3 square kilometres). The population density was 799.4 inhabitants per square mile (308.7/km^{2}). There were 9,931 housing units at an average density of 623.0 units per square mile (240.5 units/km^{2}). The racial makeup of the CDP was 94.8 percent White, 2.8 percent African American, 0.1 percent Native American, 1.0 percent Asian, 1.53 percent from other races, and 0.7 percent from two or more races. Hispanic or Latino of any race were 2.2 percent of the population.

=== Income and poverty ===
In 2010, the median income for a household in the CDP was $77,694, and the median income for a family was $104,044. Males had a median income of $52,536 versus $39,881 for females. The per capita income for the CDP was $50,043. About 1.9 percent of families and 3.7 percent of the population were below the poverty line, including 1.4 percent of those under age 18 and 2.9 percent of those age 65 or over. In the 2020 American Community Survey, the median household income increased to $90,408 with a mean of $120,362. Families had a median household income of $117,466; married-couple families $125,652; and non-family households $52,607.

=== Households and housing ===
The primary housing units on St. Simons Island are single-family homes and condominiums. Prices vary with market trends, but housing is generally available in a wide range of prices, depending on location. In 2010, according to the U.S. Census Bureau, there were 9,931 housing units on the island, 6,117 of which were occupied either by the owners (74%) or renters (26%); and 2,662 were held for "seasonal, recreational, or occasional use." Most of the remainder were for rent (6%) or for sale (4%). In 2020, the median value of owner-occupied housing units was $386,000 with a monthly cost of $2,010.

== Government and infrastructure ==
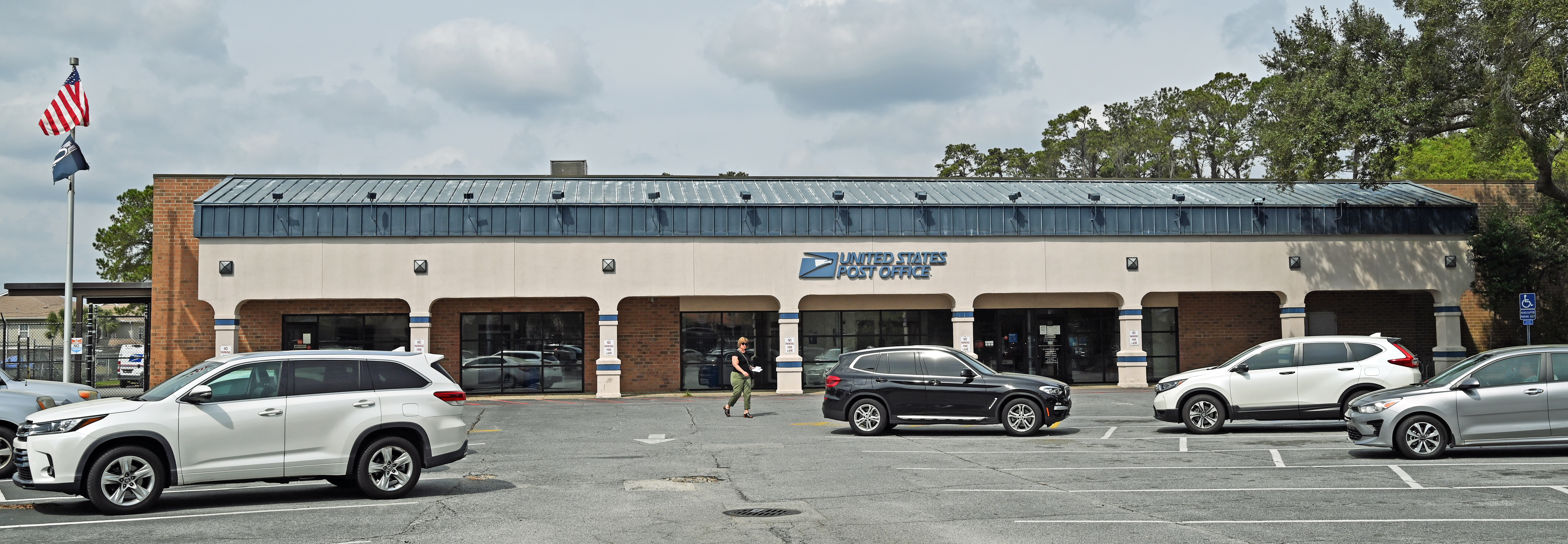
Post office

The U.S. Postal Service operates a post office on St. Simons.

== Economy ==
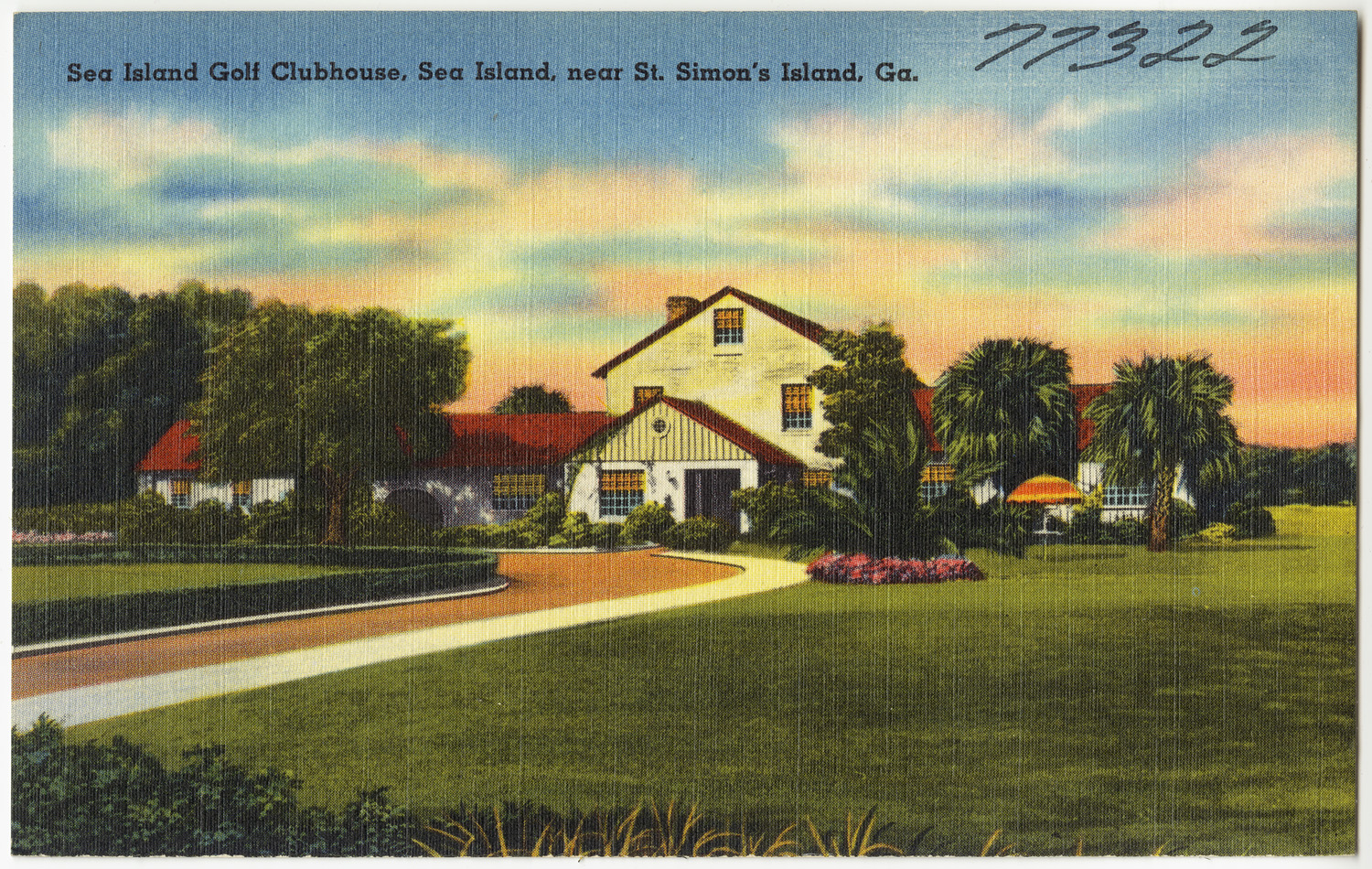
Early 20th century postcard of the Sea Island Golf Club

Tourism is the primary economic driver in the St. Simons Island economy. Major industries include hospitality, food services, retail, service businesses, and the professions. The largest employers are the Sea Island Company, King & Prince Resort and Rich Products Consumer Brands Division.

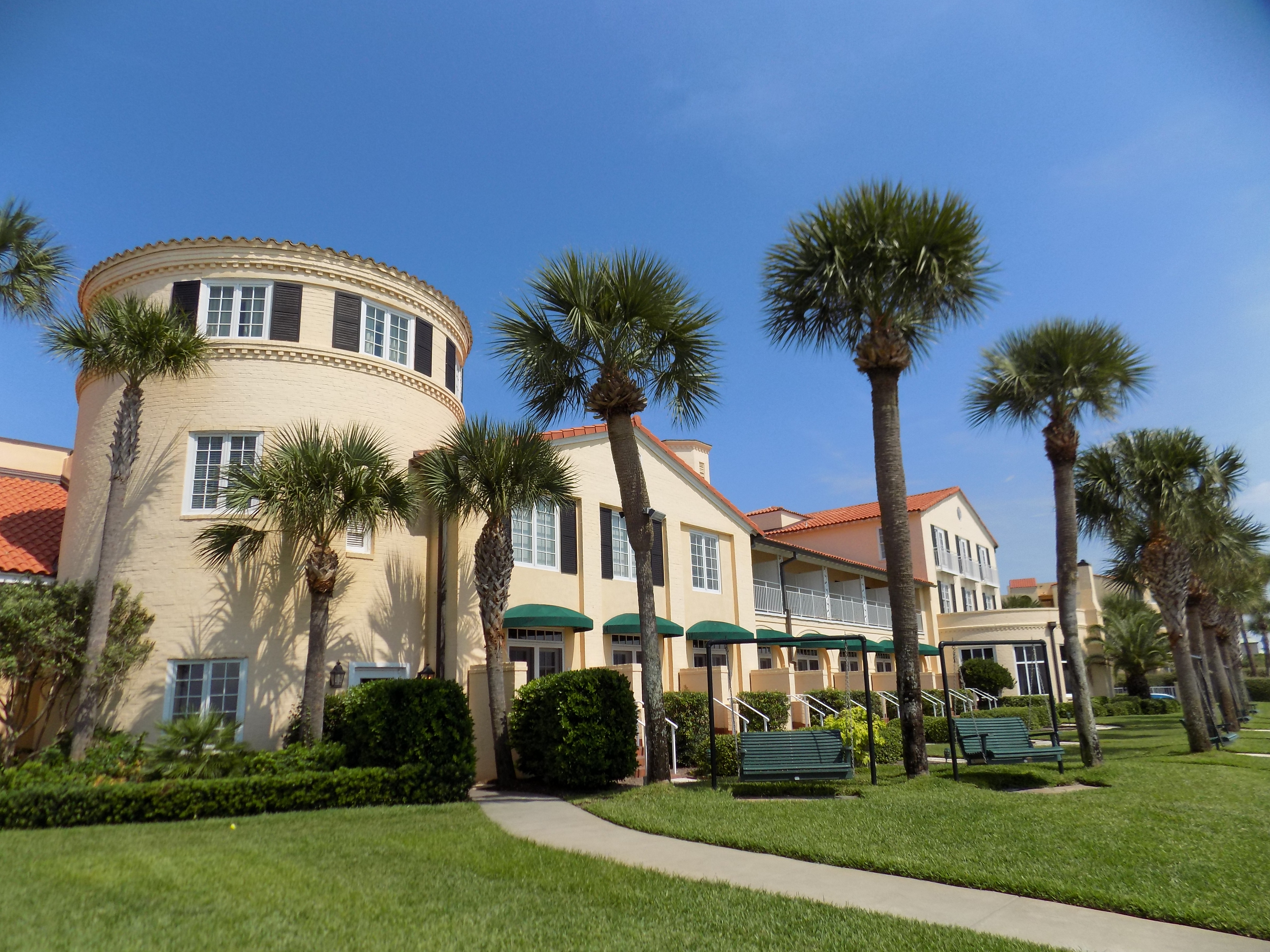
The King and Prince Beach & Golf Resort

Visitors have been coming to St. Simons Island since the late 19th century, first by boat, disembarking at the pier on its south shore, and later by car via the F. J. Torras Causeway. In 1938, the McKinnon St. Simons Island Airport opened, serving general aviation. Commercial air travelers arrive via the nearby Brunswick Golden Isles Airport (BQK). Three island marinas accommodate pleasure boaters.

Today, the island is marketed as one of Georgia's "Golden Isles", and visitation occurs throughout the year but is heaviest in the spring and summer months. Accommodations consist primarily of hotels, private rental homes, and condominium apartments along the beach and inland. Transportation is provided via taxis and vehicle rentals, including golf carts. Bicycle rentals are also available.

Visitors come to St. Simons Island for its beaches, scenic vistas, water sports, fishing, sailing, golf, historical sites, and laid-back lifestyle. The PGA Tour's RSM Classic (formerly McGladrey Classic) is held annually in November at the Sea Island Golf Club on St. Simons Island. In 2013 The Sea Island Golf Club was ranked by Golf Digest as one of America's top 50 golf courses for women.

Ecotourists come to enjoy the natural surroundings, bird-watching, and Cannon's Point Preserve. Hiking and bicycling are popular year-round activities. St. Simons Island is also a magnet for photographers and painters. Its selection of scenic and historic venues, such as the St. Simons Lighthouse and Christ Church, have made the island a popular wedding site.

As a travel destination, St. Simons Island has received recommendations from several travel publications and websites, including Condé Nast Traveler, Travel+Leisure, Smithsonian Magazine, Coastal Living, Country Living, and TripAdvisor.

== Arts and culture ==
Many creative artists are drawn to St. Simons Island as residents and visitors. Painters and photographers work to capture the scenic landscape, and their work is on display in several island galleries. Glynn Visual Arts is a non-profit organization serving local artists with exhibits, festivals, and classes in several media, including painting and drawing, pottery, photography, mixed media, jewelry, and many others. The Literary Guild of St. Simons Island supports writers with literary and cultural events. A non-profit theater group, The Island Players, schedules productions in the Pier Village Casino Theatre. Craft shows are held throughout the year in Postell Park in front of the Casino Building at the Pier Village.

There is a vibrant music scene on St. Simons Island, with local bands and musicians appearing in several venues, including summertime concerts on the oceanfront lawn by the lighthouse and classical music concerts sponsored by the Island Concert Association.

Novelist Eugenia Price visited St. Simons Island while driving from Chicago to Jacksonville in 1961. Fascinated by the island, she spent the next few years researching, eventually resulting in three novels known as the "St. Simons Trilogy." She lived on St. Simons from 1965 until she died in 1996.

The film Conrack (1974) was partly filmed on Saint Simons Island.

=== Black American heritage ===
After the American Civil War, many Geechee people who had been enslaved remained on St. Simons Island, subsisting on whatever they could harvest from their gardens and the surrounding waters. Many later found jobs with the lumber mills starting in the 1870s. They attended the First African Baptist Church, completed in 1869 by formerly enslaved people from St. Simons Island plantations. Regular services are still held today at the original site on Frederica Road, which has been diligently cared for and renovated through the years.

In October 2000, at the First African Baptist Church, a group of island residents and property owners formed the St. Simons African American Heritage Coalition to protect and preserve the history and heritage of African-Americans on St. Simons Island. Today, the coalition conducts tours of historic sites and produces the annual Georgia Sea Islands Festival to celebrate traditional Geechee African-American music, food, and crafts. More recently, the coalition, together with Friends of Harrington School, has organized a successful fund-raising effort to restore the historic Harrington School House, which was initially built in the 1920s to serve the island's Geechee or African-American children.

== Sports and activities ==
The climate on St. Simons Island is conducive to various outdoor sports and activities year-round. Golfing is one of the most popular, with seven golf courses on the island. Public tennis courts are located at Epworth Park and Mallery Park, each with lines marked for pickleball, a fast-growing paddle sport. Several island resorts also offer tennis facilities.

Eight public parks are on the island, with picnic tables, sports fields, and playgrounds. Demere Park features a skate park, and Gascoigne Park offers a disc golf course and a waterfront picnic area. The Neptune Park Fun Zone, on the south end of the island, near the Pier Village, includes a public swimming pool, miniature golf, two playgrounds, picnic tables, and restrooms. The adjacent St. Simons Casino Building hosts weddings, parties, meetings, and is home to the St. Simons Library.

Beach access points are along the island's Atlantic shoreline, but the most popular are Coast Guard Beach and Massengale Park. Both have restrooms and ADA-accessible beach access. Massengale Park also includes picnic tables and a playground.

Hikers, walkers, and bikers can enjoy the St. Simons Island-wide Trail System that stretches from the Village area to East Beach and Hampton Point at the north end. Other options include the Alice Richards Botanical Trail in Frederica Park, the John Gilbert Nature Trail just off Frederica Road, the Southeast Georgia Health System Fitness Trail near Gascoigne Bluff, and Cannon's Point Preserve (appropriate clothing and provisions for a wilderness area are recommended). Additional outdoor activities include kayaking, paddleboarding, and horseback riding. Boating and sailing excursions are also available.

=== Neptune Park ===
Neptune Park includes the Neptune Park Fun Zone and is in the "village" area and adjacent to the pier. Neptune Park was named after Neptune Small, a man enslaved by Retreat Plantation owner Henry King. King and his brothers fought for the Confederacy in the American Civil War, with Small going with him. King was killed at the Battle of Fredericksburg. When night fell and King had not returned from the battlefield, Small went to look for him. Small found King's body and personally brought it back from Virginia to St. Simons for burial (at Christ Church). Legend has it that the King family gave Neptune Small 8 acres of their plantation, part of which is now Neptune Park. However, there is no evidence of Small owning that area or of the King family giving him any land. He did own several acres of land a little west of the current Neptune Park.

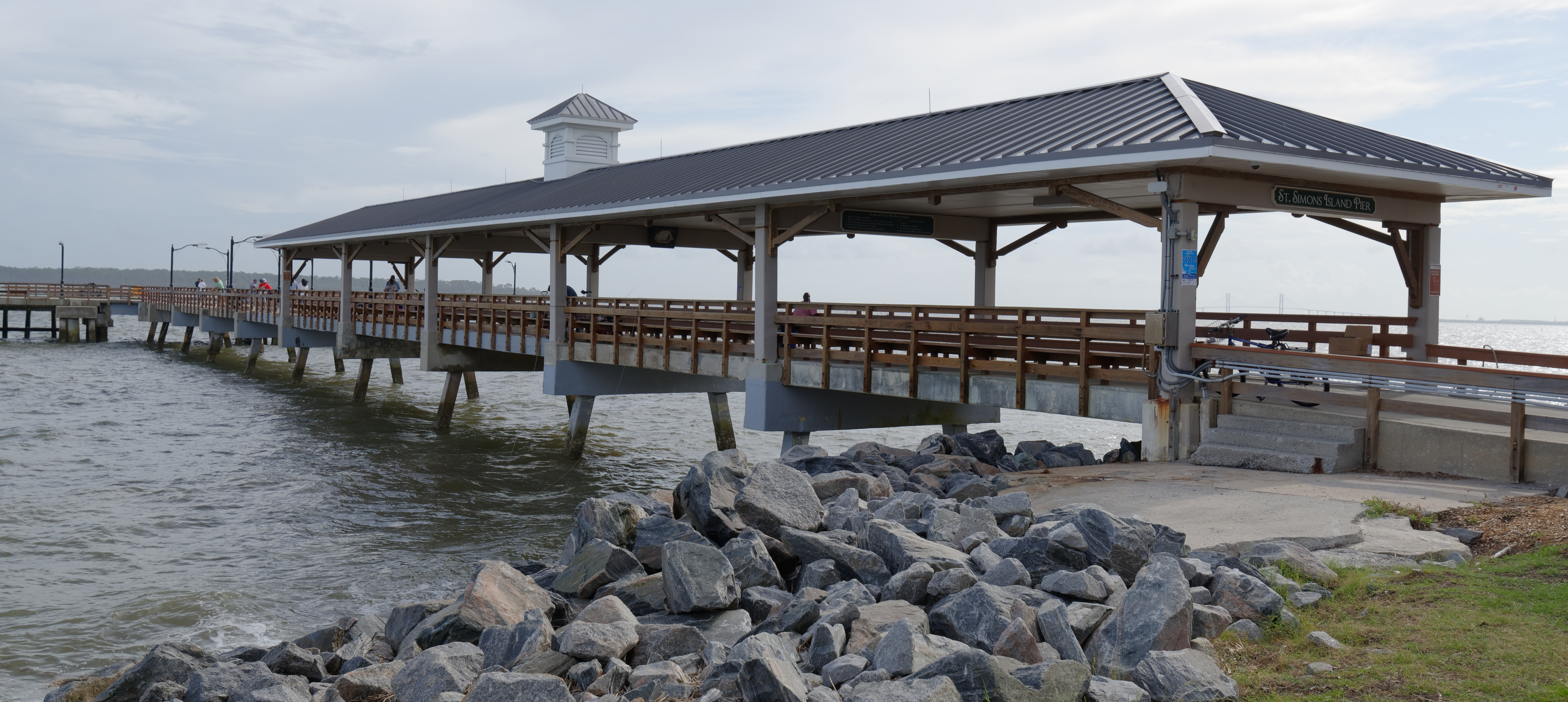
The pier at Neptune Park

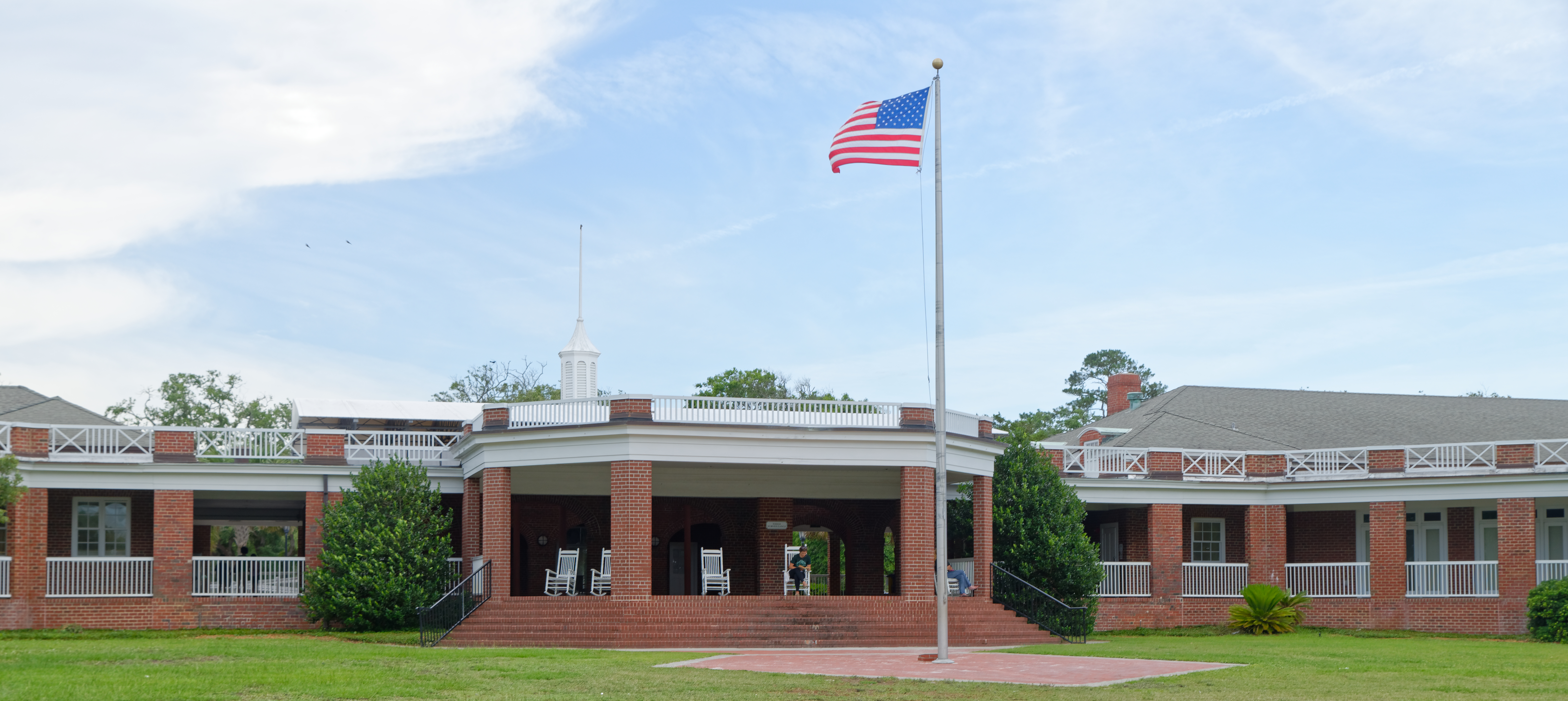
The Casino at Neptune Park (the third so-named building)

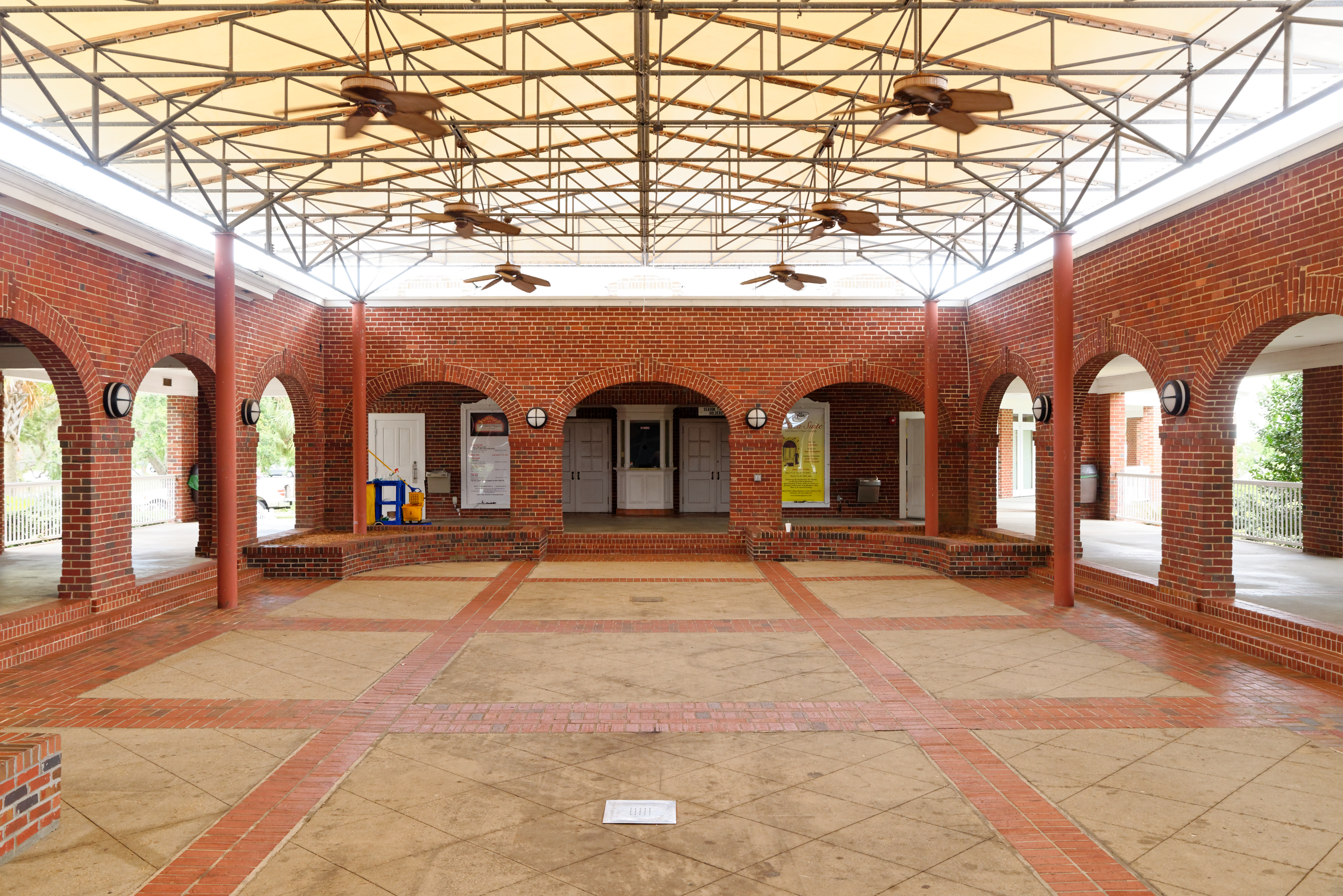
Inside the Casino

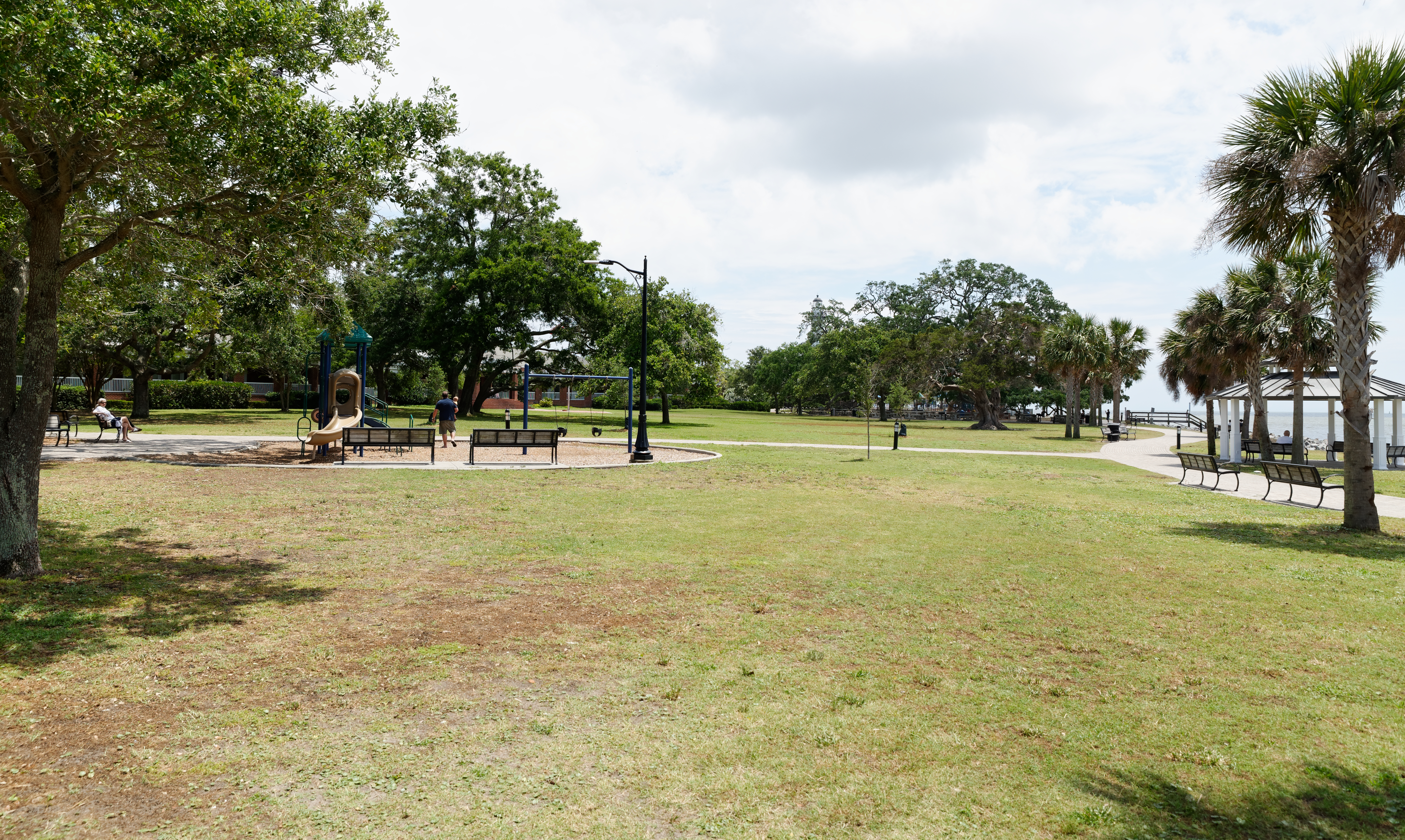
Neptune Park

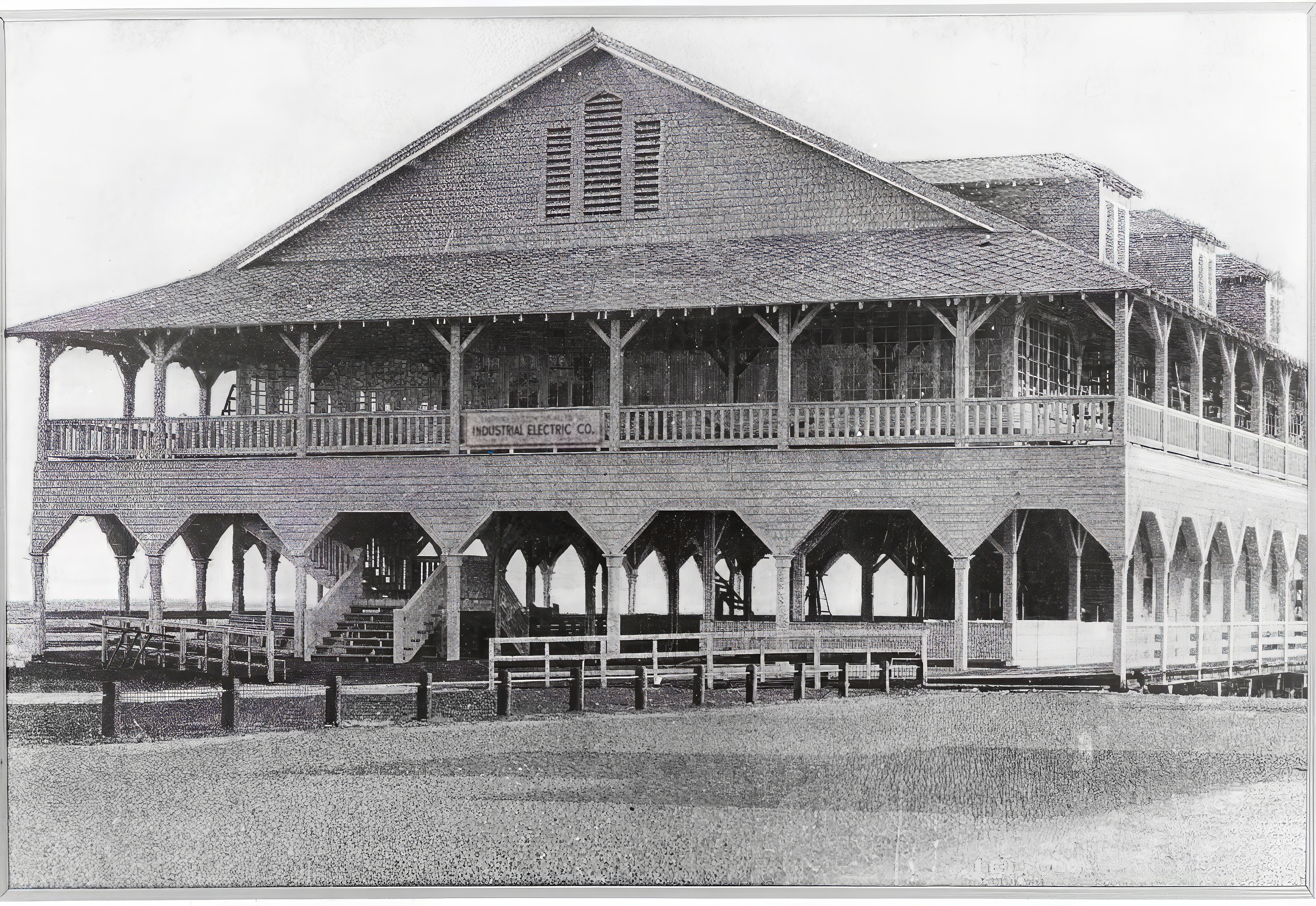
Old Casino (demolished)

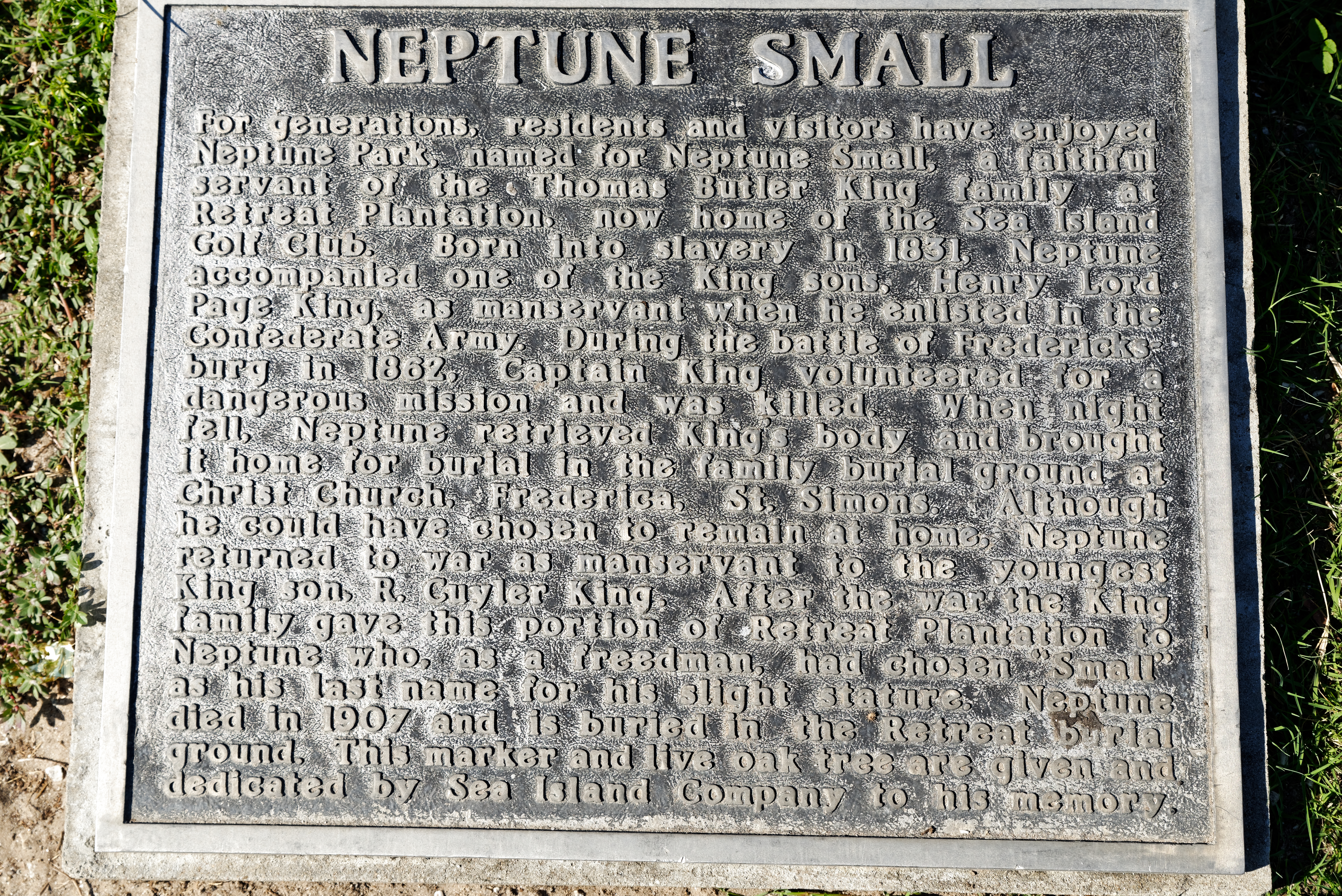
Neptune Small plaque

== Points of interest ==
=== A. W. Jones Heritage Center ===
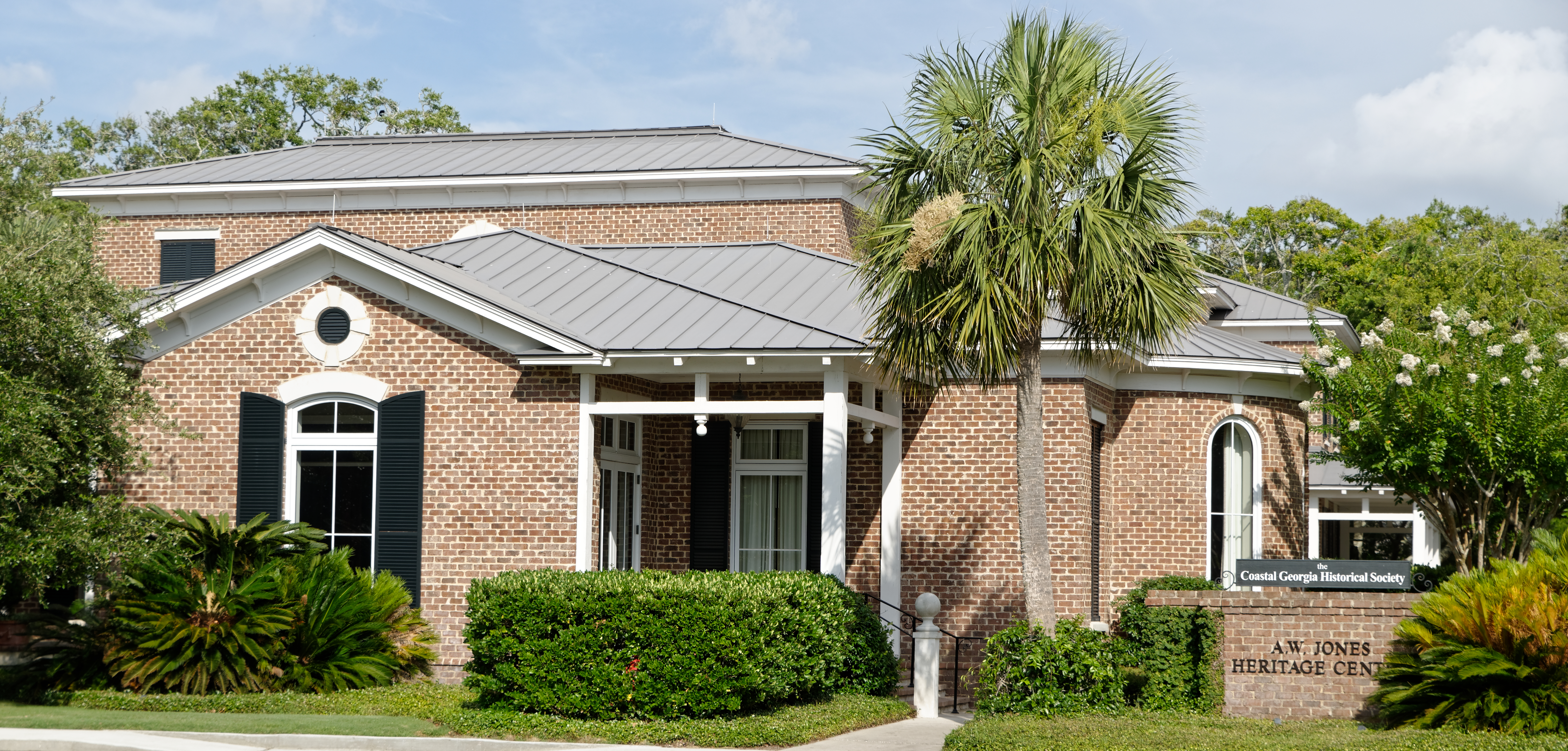
A. W. Jones Heritage Center

Opened in 2008, the A.W. Jones Heritage Center at 610 Beachview Drive is the headquarters facility for the Coastal Georgia Historical Society. The 10,000 sq. ft. building contains an entrance gallery featuring exhibits, an executive board room, a gift shop, a 1,400 sq. ft. event hall available for rent, a research library, and the Society's vast collection of objects, artifacts, and archival materials from hundreds of years of coastal Georgia history.

=== Arthur J. Moore Methodist Museum and Library ===
Dedicated in June 1966, the Arthur J. Moore Methodist Museum and Library is on the grounds of Epworth by the Sea. It houses a collection of books and historical artifacts related to the early history of St. Simons Island and John and Charles Wesley, founders of the Methodist movement, who arrived on the island with James Oglethorpe. The Moore Museum is the official repository of the archives of the South Georgia Conference of the United Methodist Church and is open to the public Monday through Saturday. Admission is free.

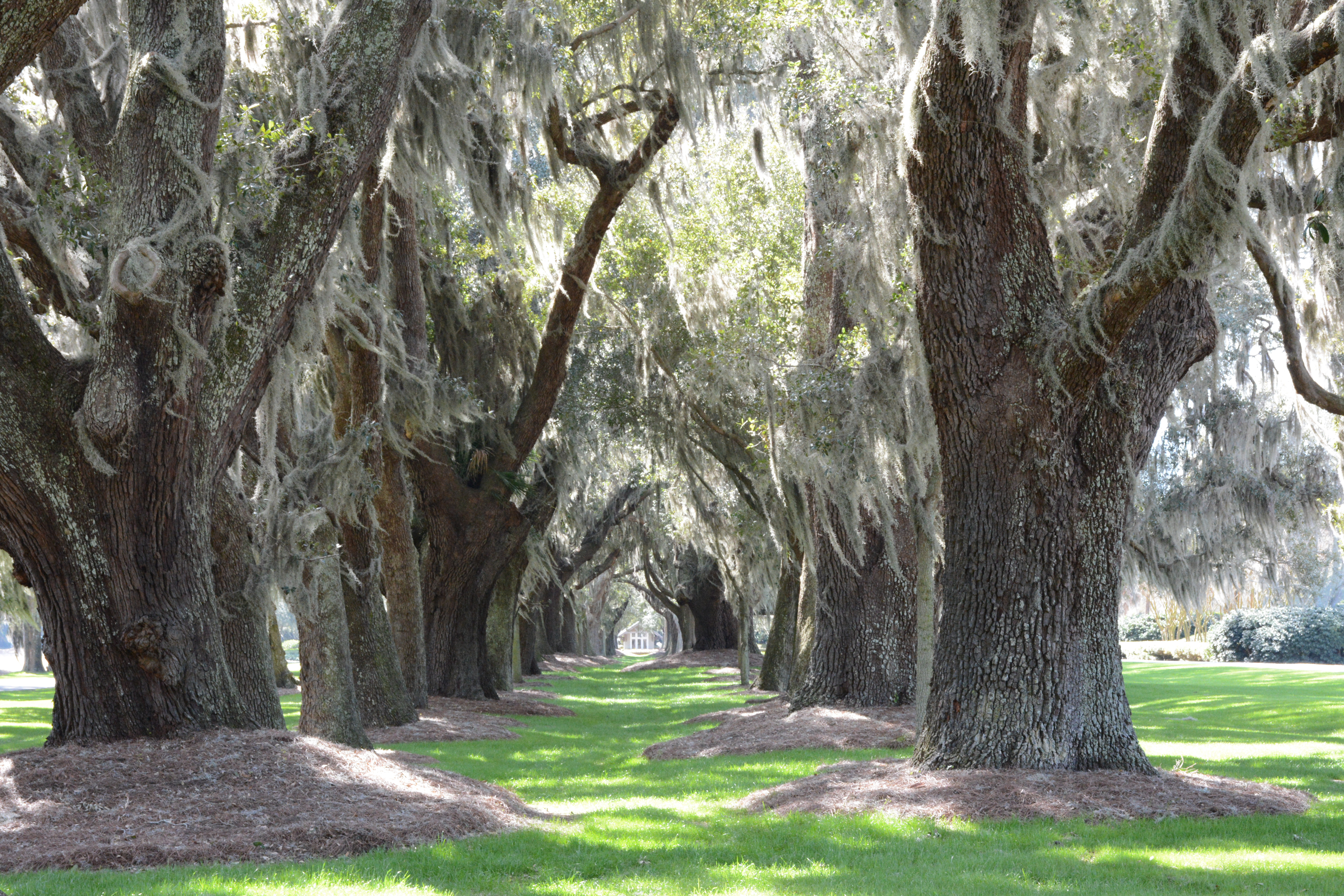
Avenue of oaks, St. Simons

=== Avenue of the Oaks ===
Initially planted in 1850 by Anne Page King as the carriage entrance to Retreat Plantation, two rows of live oaks grace the Sea Island Golf Club entry at the south end of St. Simons Island on Retreat Avenue, off Kings Way. Visitors can view the oaks by driving toward the entrance to the Golf Club, then circling back.

=== Bloody Marsh Battle Site ===
At the Battle of Bloody Marsh on July 7, 1742, an outnumbered force of British soldiers ambushed and defeated Spanish troops, halting a planned attack on Fort Frederica. Markers and information panels at this outdoor observation site explain the battle, which permanently ended Spain's claims to the Georgia territory. Located off Old Demere Road, the site is managed by the National Park Service as a unit of Fort Frederica National Monument.

=== Cannon's Point Preserve ===
A 600-acre wilderness tract on the northeast corner of St. Simons Island, Cannon's Point is the last remaining undisturbed maritime forest on the island. Owned by the St. Simons Land Trust, the Preserve includes a salt marsh, tidal creek, river shoreline, 4,000-year-old shell middens, and ruins of a 17th-century plantation house and slave quarters. The Nature Conservancy holds a conservation easement on the property to ensure its preservation for future generations. The Preserve is open to the public during specified days and hours. Visitors should wear clothing appropriate for a wilderness outing and bring bug spray.

=== Cassina Garden Club Tabby Slave Cabins ===
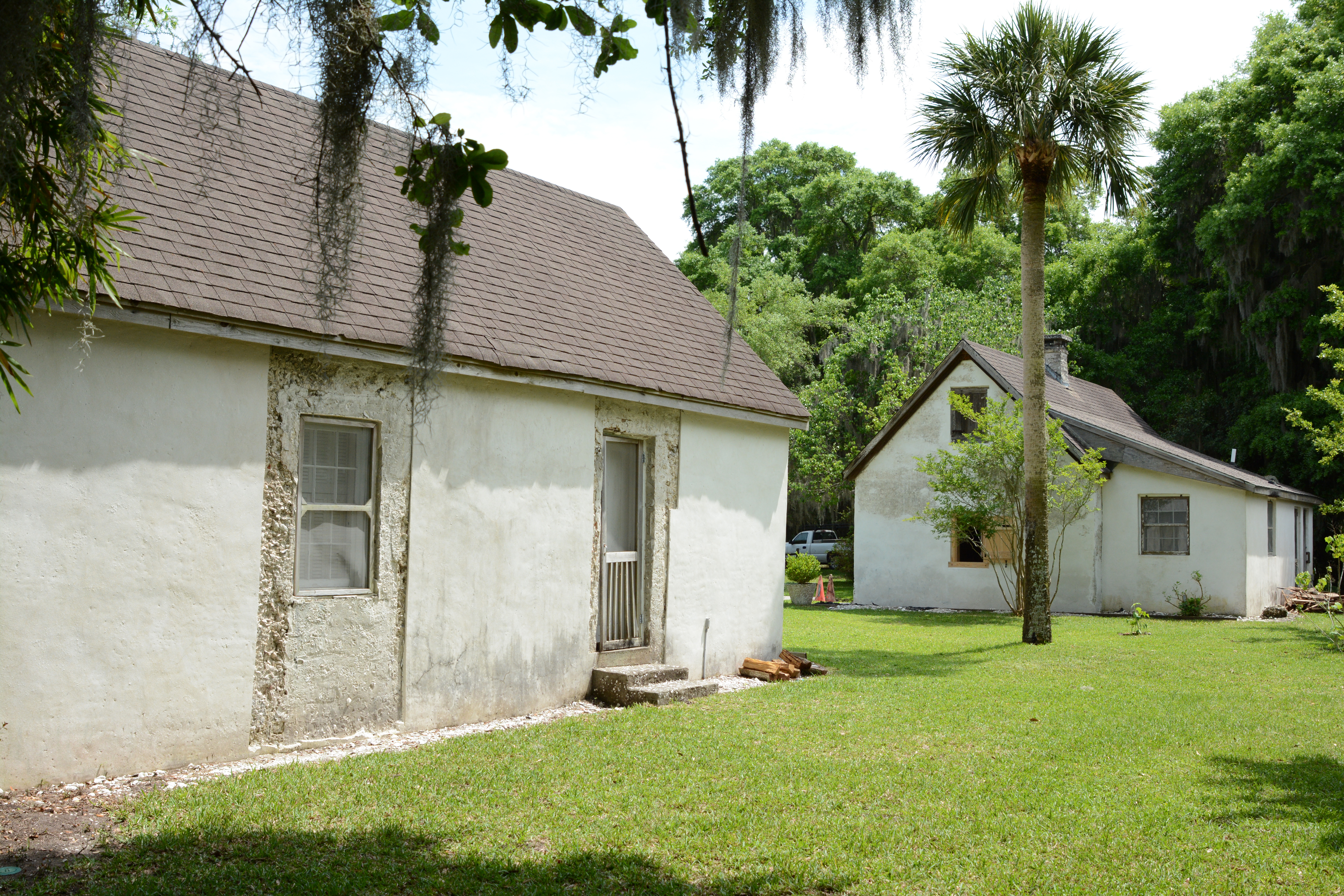
Slave cabins

Located on Gascoigne Bluff, Hamilton Plantation was one of the most prosperous plantations on St. Simons Island, growing high-quality Sea Island cotton. Of the several slave cabins built on the plantation, two remain today. These slave cabins were constructed of tabby, a concrete-like mixture of lime, sand, water, and oyster shells. Owned and operated by the Cassina Garden Club, the cabins are open to the public on Wednesdays in June, July, and August. Private tours can be arranged at other times.

=== Christ Church ===
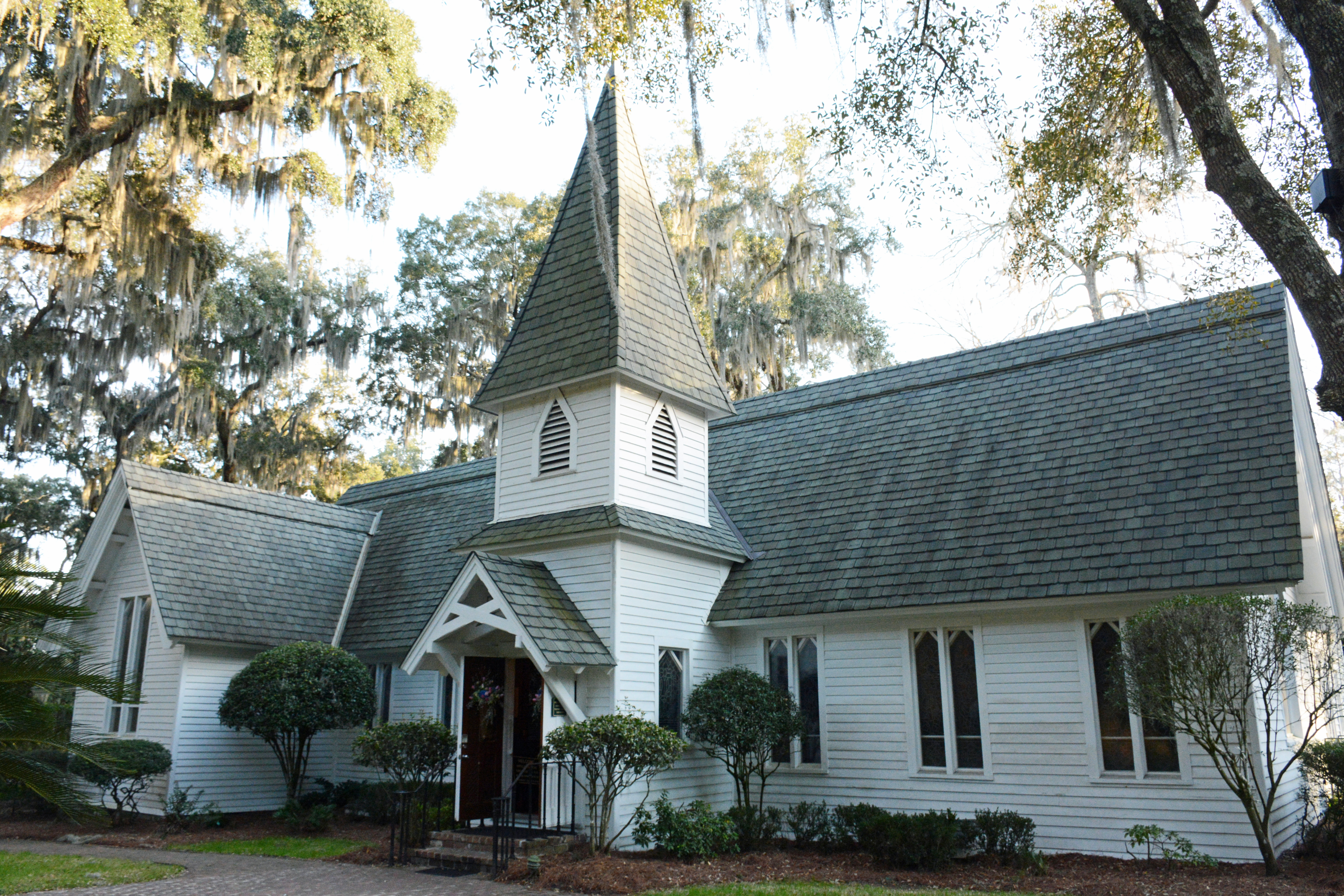
Christ Church

In 1808 the state of Georgia gave 100 acres (40 hectares) of land on St. Simons to be used for an Episcopal church and its support. Called Christ Church, the structure was finished in 1820. During the Civil War, invading U.S. troops commandeered the small building to stable horses and virtually destroyed it. The church was restored in 1884 by lumber magnate Anson Phelps Dodge, whose son became the new church's first rector. Located at 6329 Frederica Road, just south of Fort Frederica National Monument, this historic building is home to an active Episcopal congregation. The adjacent cemetery contains gravesites dating as far back as 1803.

=== Epworth By The Sea ===
Epworth By The Sea is a 100-acre conference and retreat center owned by the South Georgia Conference of the United Methodist Church. The property at Gascoigne Bluff includes six motels, 12 family apartments, 13 youth cabins, auditoriums, classrooms, and meeting rooms. Four dining rooms and a preschool/nursery building with a fenced playground exist. An in-season swimming pool, athletic field, covered basketball courts, tennis courts, bicycle rentals, and fishing piers provide activities for all ages. Lovely Lane Chapel, constructed in 1880, hosts Sunday services and is available for weddings.

=== Fort Frederica National Monument ===
Fort Frederica was established in 1736 by British General James Oglethorpe to defend the southern border of his Georgia colony. The facility was a fortress and a small town on the Frederica River. In 1742, troops from the fort defeated invading Spanish forces at the Battle of Bloody Marsh, which was decisive in ending Spanish influence and securing the Georgia colony under British rule. By mid-century, the troops were withdrawn, and the colonists abandoned the town, which then fell into disrepair. In 1945, Fort Frederica was established as a national monument and is currently operated by the National Park Service.

=== Gascoigne Bluff ===
Gascoigne Bluff has been a focal point for almost the entire history of St. Simons Island. Long before the arrival of Europeans, Native Americans and Aborigines lived and camped on the site. The Spanish also built a mission on or near the area. When General Oglethorpe and the British arrived in 1736, they established a naval facility at the bluff and granted 500 acres (200 hectares) of its land to Captain James Gascoigne, of the sloop-of-war Hawk, and the name persists to this day. In 1794, lumber from the area was used to construct the frigate, "Old Ironsides." During the antebellum period of cotton farming, the bluff was the site of the Hamilton plantation, of which two slave cabins remain standing today. In the late 19th century, lumber mills thrived at the scene. Today, the bluff is occupied by Epworth By The Sea and Gascoigne Bluff Park at its southern end, with picnic tables, restrooms, fishing pier, and a 10- hole disc golf course.

=== Lovely Lane Chapel ===
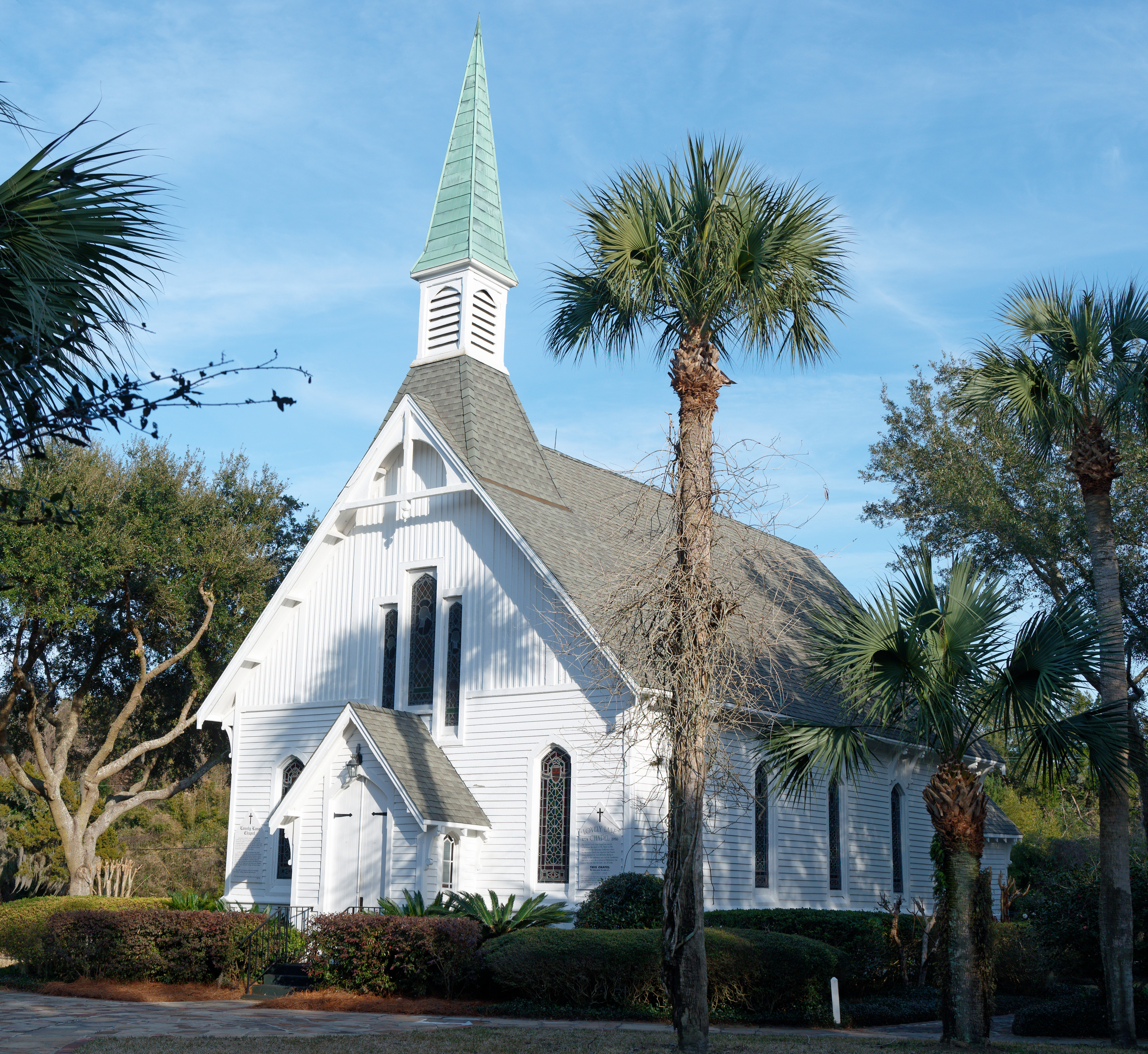
Lovely Lane Chapel at Epworth by the Sea

In 1880, Norman W. Dodge built St. James Union Church at Gascoigne Bluff to serve the lumber mill community. After the mills shut down, the building was deconsecrated in the 1920s and became a social hall. When the Methodists acquired the property in 1949, they renamed it Lovely Lane Chapel. The chapel is open to the public for Sunday worship services and wedding ceremonies. It is located at 100 Arthur J. Moore Drive.

=== World War II Home Front Museum at the Historic Coast Guard Station ===
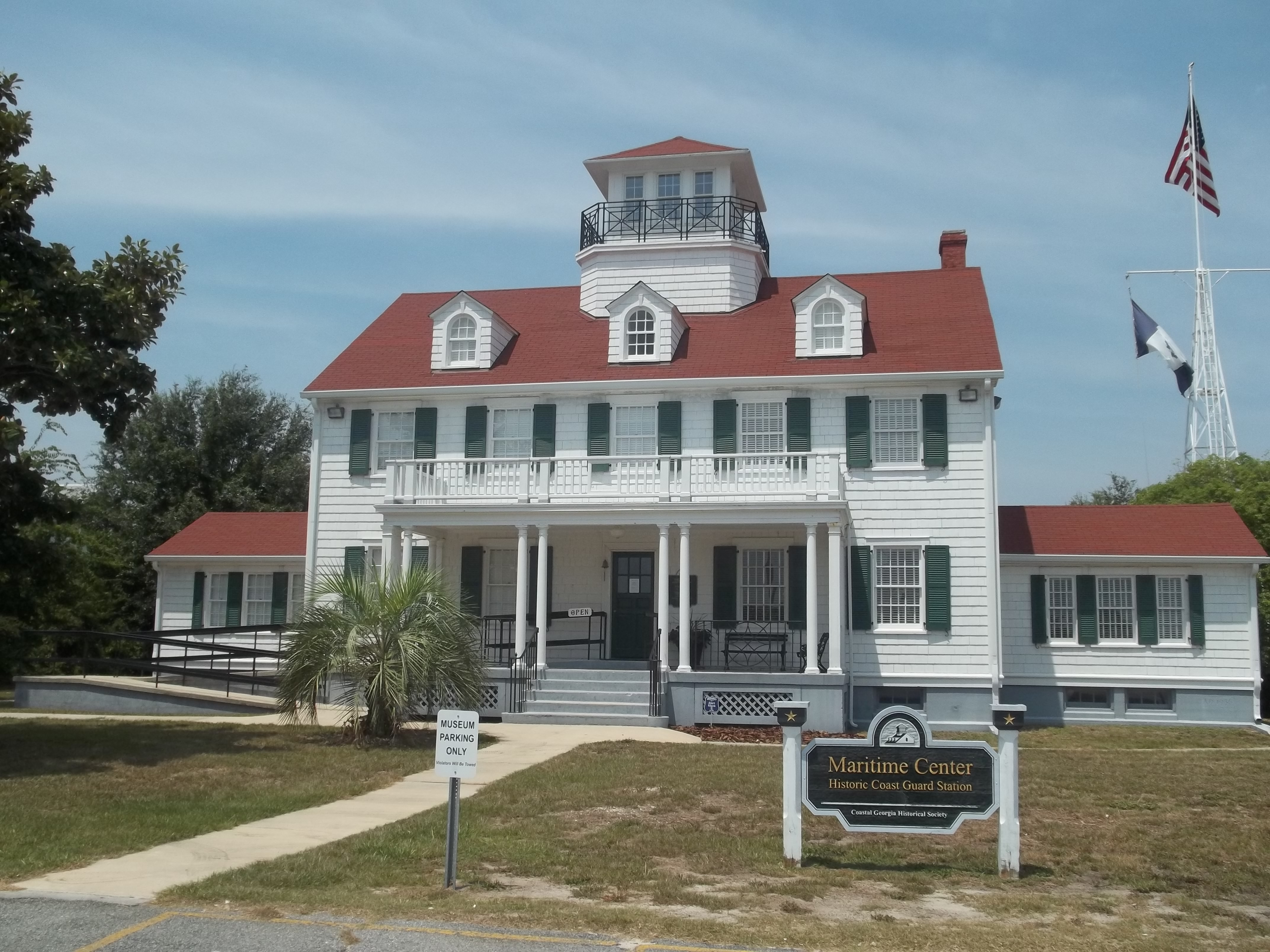
U.S. Coast Guard Station

The Coastal Georgia Historical Society operates the World War II Home Front Museum. The Museum is housed in the Historic St. Simons Coast Guard Station, built in 1936. Step back to April 8, 1942, when the crew from this station rescued survivors of two American ships torpedoed by a German U-boat 13 miles off St. Simons Island. The museum focuses on the contributions of Georgia and other states in production and home defense during the Second World War.

=== St. Simons Island Lighthouse Museum ===
The original St. Simons Island Light, built in 1811, was destroyed by Confederate troops in 1861 to prevent its use by U.S. Navy sailors. Rebuilt in 1872, it continues to operate today, owned by the Coastal Georgia Historical Society and maintained by the United States Coast Guard Auxiliary. The adjacent keeper's residence Is now a museum operated by the Coastal Georgia Historical Society, featuring lighthouse exhibits and a restored keeper's dwelling. Visitors may climb the 129 steps to the observatory for panoramic views of the ocean, nearby islands, and the mainland.

== Education ==
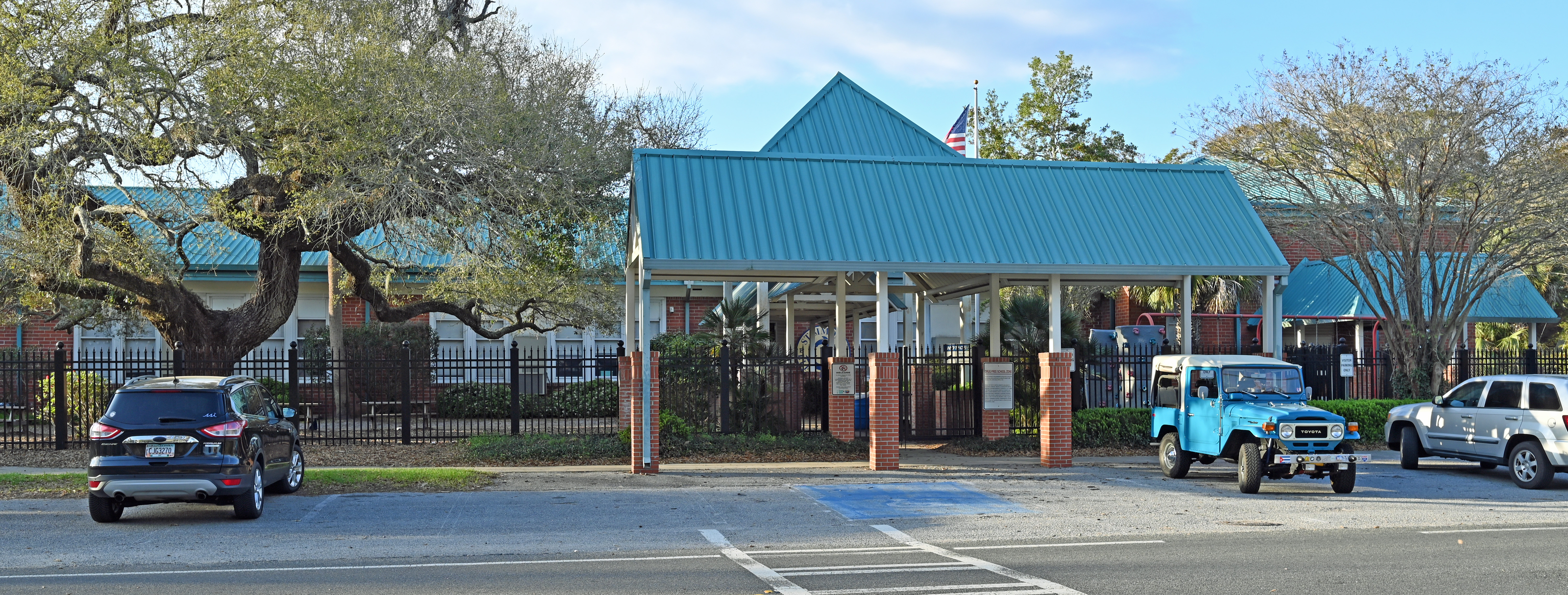
St. Simons Elementary School

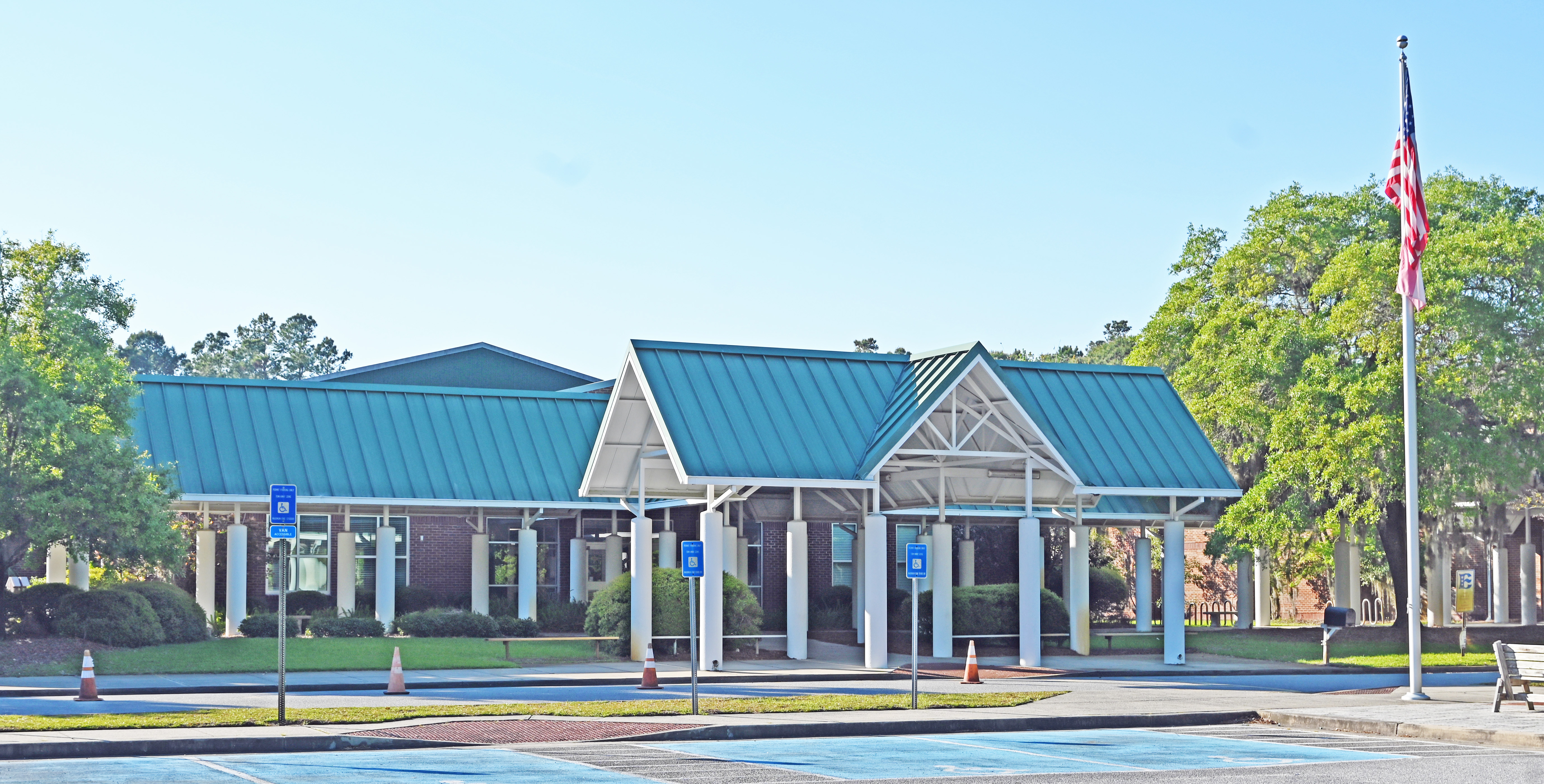
Oglethorpe Point Elementary School

St. Simons Island is part of the Glynn County School District. There are two public schools on the Island: Oglethorpe Point Elementary and St. Simons Elementary, serving grades PK to 5.

Zoned schools include:

- Oglethorpe Point Elementary School (OPES) and St. Simons Elementary School (SSES)
- Glynn Middle School (GMS)
- Glynn Academy (GA)

Private schools:

- Frederica Academy – grades PK-12
- St. Simons Christian School – grades PK-8
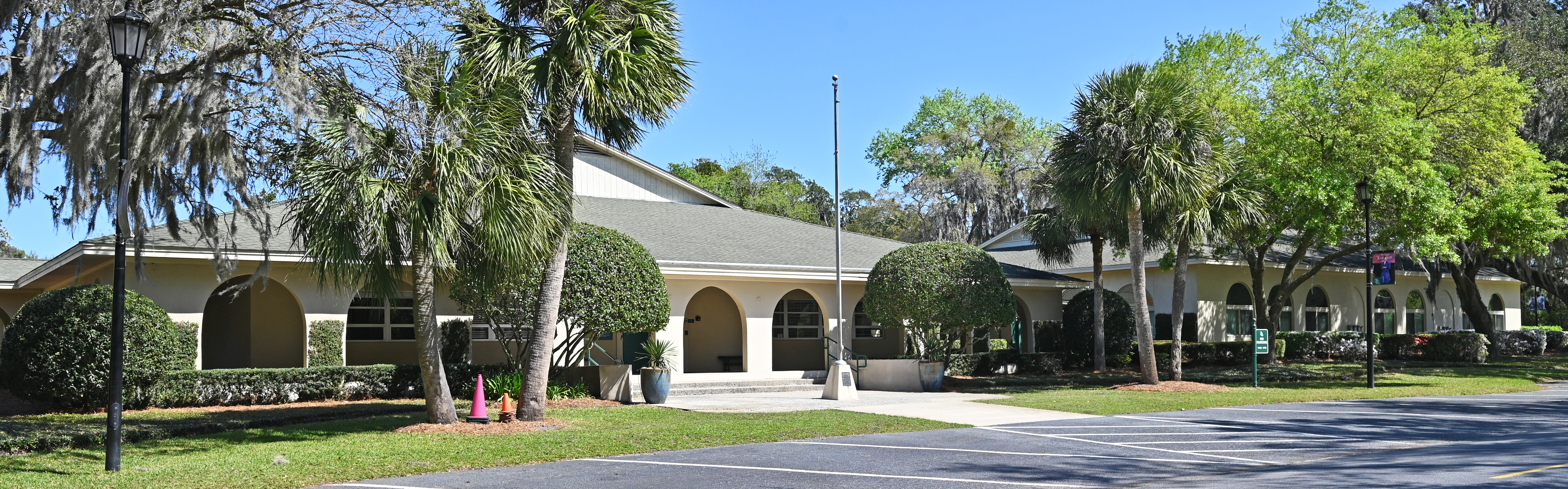
Frederica Academy

== Notable people ==
- Tina McElroy Ansa — novelist, journalist, essayist, and short-story writer
- Griffin Bell — former U.S. Attorney General
- Iris Faircloth Blitch — former United States Representative to congress
- Morgan Brian — member of the United States women's national soccer team, World Cup Champion, Olympian
- Alton Brown — Food Network personality
- Jim Brown — Hall of Fame NFL player and actor
- Kwame Brown — former NBA player, Glynn Academy High School
- Jonathan Byrd — professional golfer
- Buddy Carter — U.S. representative
- Jack Davis — cartoonist
- William Diehl — award-winning novelist, New York Times Best Seller list
- Morgan Gautrat — soccer player
- Brian Harman — professional golfer
- Sam Hunt — part-time resident, country singer
- Anna Jay — professional wrestler competing at AEW
- Zach Johnson — professional golfer
- Bessie Jones — gospel singer
- Matt Kuchar — professional golfer
- Davis Love III — professional golfer
- Mack Mattingly — former U.S. Senator
- Laura Morelli — art historian, historical novelist
- J. Reginald Murphy — former editor of Atlanta Constitution, San Francisco Chronicle, and former president of National Geographic Society
- Sam Nunn — former U.S. Senator
- Eugenia Price — author of the Georgia Trilogy and St. Simons Trilogy, among other historical novels
- Bob Schieffer — television journalist and former anchor of the CBS Evening News
- John Smoltz — part-time resident, retired MLB pitcher, formerly with the Atlanta Braves
- Adam Wainwright — former MLB pitcher for the St. Louis Cardinals
- Heather Whitestone — Miss America 1995, first disabled Miss America
