= List of St. Petersburg College alumni =

This list of St. Petersburg College alumni includes graduates, non-graduate former students, and current students of St. Petersburg College.

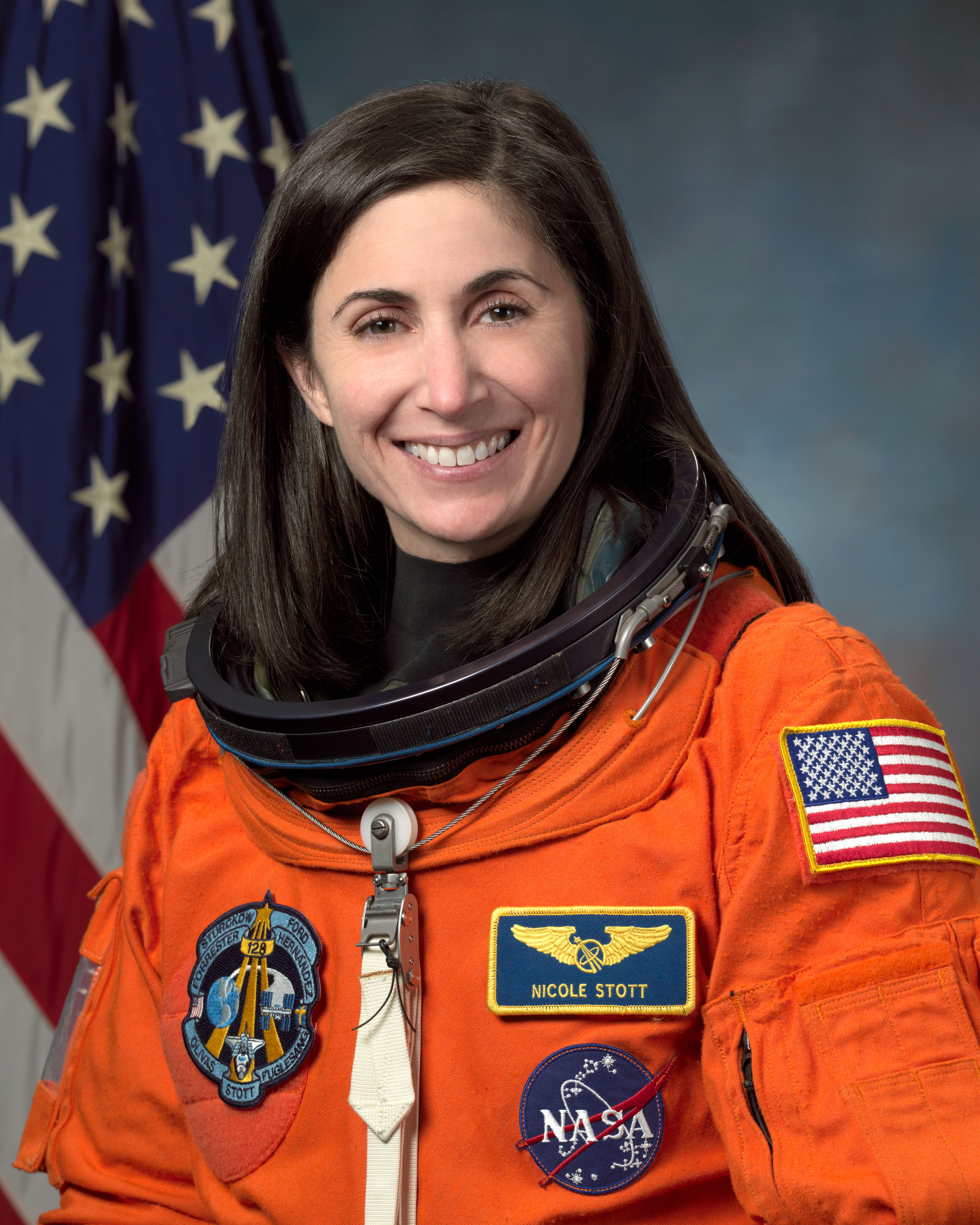
Astronaut Nicole Stott

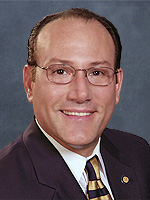
Victor Crist

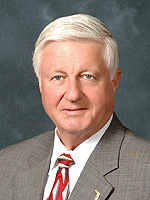
Dennis Jones

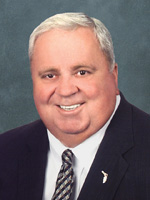
Jim King

| Alumni | Notability |
|---|---|
| Kurt Abbott | MLB player for the Oakland Athletics and the Florida Marlins |
| Alfredo Amézaga | Former Major League Baseball infielder |
| Carroll Baker | Actress, Baby Doll (1956) and How the West Was Won (1962) |
| Gus Bilirakis | Current U.S. representative |
| Bruce G. Blowers | Classically trained musician, singer-songwriter |
| Tee Corinne | Activist for lesbian sexual, literary, and artistic expression |
| William C. Cramer | Former U.S. representative |
| Victor Crist | Current member of the Florida Senate |
| Gloria Ehret | Former golfer on the LPGA Tour |
| Frank Farkas | Former member of the Florida House of Representatives |
| Mike Fasano | Current member of the Florida Senate |
| George Greer | Circuit court judge in Florida who presided over the Terri Schiavo case |
| Ed Hooper | Current member of the Florida House of Representatives |
| Doug Jamerson | Former Florida commissioner of education |
| Dennis Jones | Former member of the Florida Senate |
| Steve Lombardozzi Jr. | Major League Baseball player |
| James E. King | Former member of the Florida Senate |
| Elizabeth A. Kovachevich | Current United States district judge |
| Carl M. Kuttler Jr. | Former president of St. Petersburg College |
| Janet Long | Current member of the Florida House of Representatives |
| Henry Lyons | Former president of the National Baptist Convention, USA, Inc. |
| Nick Masset | Former Major League Baseball pitcher |
| E. Ann McGee | Current president of Seminole Community College |
| Jim Morrison | Singer-songwriter of The Doors, briefly attended |
| Peter Nehr | Current member of the Florida House of Representatives |
| Steve Oelrich | Current member of the Florida Senate |
| Nicole P. Stott | NASA astronaut |
| Bobby Wilson | Current Major League Baseball catcher for the Texas Rangers |
| Frank Wren | Current general manager of the Atlanta Braves |
