= Jim Murdaugh =

American university administrator

6th President of Tallahassee State College
- Incumbent
- Assumed office October 18, 2010
- Preceded by: William D. Law

1st Director of Florida Public Safety Institute
- In office 1999 – October 17, 2010
- Preceded by: new position
- Succeeded by: Steve Outlaw

Personal details
- Born: James Thomas Murdaugh; October 2, 1952 (age 74) Orlando, Florida, U.S.
- Spouse: Sara (m. 1994)
- Children: Austin
- Education: Florida State University; BS, MS Criminology; PhD Public administration
- Occupation: Law enforcement officer; politician; Military officer

Military service
- Branch/service: Air Force Reserve Command
- Years of service: 30
- Rank: Lieutenant colonel
- Commands: Commander of the 96th Security Forces Squadron ⋅

Academic background
- Thesis: Succession and the Police Chief: An Examination of the Nature of Turnover Among Florida Police Chiefs. (2005)
- Doctoral advisor: Richard C. Feiock

Academic work
- Institutions: Leon County Sheriff's Office; Fort Walton Beach Police Department; Florida Department of Law Enforcement

Jim Murdaugh
- Police career
- Allegiance: Leon County, Florida
- Department: Leon County Sheriff's Office
- Service years: 1977–1983
- Rank: Lieutenant

Jim Murdaugh (born October 2, 1952) is an American administrator, retired military officer, retired law-enforcement officer, and published author who is the president of Tallahassee State College. He previously served as Director of the Florida Public Safety Institute for 11 years. In 2010 Murdaugh was selected to serve as the 6th president of Tallahassee State College after the departure of former President William D. Law. He assumed office on October 18, 2010.

== Early life and education ==
Murdaugh was born October 18, 1952 and he spent his early years in Orlando, Florida before Disney. His father was actually a rocket scientist working for Martin Marietta designing Sprint and Spartan missiles. After graduating from Colonial High School in 1970, he followed a girlfriend to Florida State University. He had a vague idea about studying Geology. The Vietnam War was raging, so he decided to enter the Air Force ROTC program. The Detachment Commander told him there were no geologists in the Air Force, but his field of study really didn't matter. Murdaugh decided to change majors, switching to Criminology. He completed his bachelor's degree in 1974 and received permission to pursue a master's degree; his graduation was in 1976.

== Career ==
=== Air Force ===
In 1976 the war was over, and the military didn't need more career officers, so Murdaugh completed his service and entered the Air Force Reserve.

He was recalled to active duty for the Gulf Wars and following the September 11 attacks. He commanded the 96th Security Forces Squadron and as Eglin Air Force Base's Chief of Security. He retired as a Lieutenant colonel with 30 years of service in 2004.

=== Law enforcement ===
In 1976, he was hired at the Florida Bureau of Criminal Justice Planning and Assistance in Tallahassee. While employed there, he met Jacksonville Sheriff Dale Carson who took a liking to the young Murdaugh and influenced him to enter law enforcement. The next year, Ken Katsaris was elected Leon County Sheriff. One of Murdaugh's friends was hired as a Captain, who invited Murdaugh to become a deputy, and he agreed because he liked the idea of helping and protecting people. Murdaugh had minor involvement in the Ted Bundy case and was promoted to Sergeant after just two years. Four years later, Murdaugh had risen to Lieutenant when he was invited to join the Fort Walton Beach Police Department by their chief, who was a friend. He became Commander of Patrol and Detective Operations there, but within a year, the chief was fired and Murdaugh became interim Police Chief.

When a new Fort Walton Beach police chief was hired in 1984, Murdaugh left to become Bureau Chief of Florida Attorney General Jim Smith's crime prevention program. He started new programs including the first training course for School resource officers, receiving national recognition. He served at the Florida Department of Law Enforcement in senior leadership roles from 1988 to 1999. He began work on his PhD degree and also graduated from the Leadership Florida Executive Class VII and the government executive program at Harvard University's John F. Kennedy School of Government.

=== Education ===
The Pat Thomas Law Enforcement Academy was named for popular Quincy legislator Pat Thomas in 1996. Jim Murdaugh was hired by FSU President T. K. Wetherell to head the Pat Thomas Law Enforcement Academy in 1999. He finished his Doctor of Philosophy degree in Public Administration during 2005. Governor Jeb Bush stated that he wanted to consolidate law enforcement training for the state agencies. Murdaugh listened and began planning and researching to make it happen. The Florida Public Safety Institute (FPSI) was created in 2009 as the umbrella organization for the Pat Thomas Law Enforcement Academy and other entities that include the Tallahassee Fire Academy, the Fish and Wildlife Conservation academy and the Florida Highway Patrol Academy. A new FPSI center opened in 2009. Under Murdaugh's control, the FPSI became a large and highly respected public safety institute, second only to Federal Law Enforcement Training Centers at Glynco, Georgia. As of 2020, 10% of TSCs graduates are from the FPSI. William D. Law was TCC President from 2002 until he unexpectedly resigned in 2009 to become president of St. Petersburg College. Encouraged by family, friends and colleagues, Murdaugh submitted his name for consideration as President, and was selected.

After the United Faculty of Florida was certified to represent TCCs employees, Murdaugh announced that he was disbanding the Faculty Senate because the union was handling the issues of the Faculty Senate. After discussion with Faculty Senate chairman Patrick McDermott, they decided to restructure the group, which was created in 1997. The purpose of the Faculty Senate changed to provide faculty input into curriculum and operational issues.

According to Murdaugh, in all organizations and all levels of employees, leadership education and development is key. Each employee has responsibilities that contribute to the quality of the activities we do and outcomes we want. Leadership is a behavior, not a position.

As of 2025, he had served as president for 16 years, longer than any previous leader at the school. Murdaugh wants Tallahassee State College to be the choice of students, faculty, staff and the community. He sees leadership as a behavior, not a position, and he wants to give people the opportunity to succeed. The Florida Department of Economic Opportunity sends out a monthly list of hot occupations. Murdaugh makes certain that TSC can train students for all those jobs. In a 2023 podcast, he was asked how long he would remain. He responded that he was in good health, enjoyed his work and the college was doing good things. When one of those changed, he would step down.

== Civic work ==
- Big Bend Minority Chamber of Commerce (board member)
- National Association for Community College Entrepreneurship (board of directors)
- Tallahassee Rotary Club (member)
- United Way of the Big Bend (board of directors) (2021-22 chairman)
- Leon County Economic Development Council (former chair)
- Economic Club of Florida (director)
- Advisory Board of the Florida Technology Council (member)
- Florida Chamber of Commerce Foundation (trustee)
- Florida Chamber of Commerce Board of Governors (member)
- Leadership Florida Northwest Regional Council (member)
- Florida College System Council of Presidents (2019-20 chairman)
- National Association for Community College Entrepreneurship (board of directors)

== Honors ==
- FSU College of Criminology & Criminal Justice Hall of Fame (2011).
- Heroes in Public Safety Lifetime Achievement Award (2020) presented by Frank Messersmith.
- Leader of the Year Award from Leadership Tallahassee (2012).
- Florida's Newsmakers of the Year (2012) from Florida Trend.
- Pillar of Excellence Award from the MLK Foundation of Florida (2013).
- Humanitarian Award from the MLK Foundation of Florida (2015).
- National Award of Excellence in Emerging Leadership FINALIST from American Association of Community Colleges (2014).
- International President of the Year from Association of College Unions International (2017).
- Entrepreneurial President of the Year from National Association for Community College Entrepreneurship (2022).
- Florida 500 (most influential business leaders) from Florida Trend (2023) & (2024).
- Lifetime Achievement Award from Association of Florida Colleges (2023).

== Personal life ==
Murdaugh has been married to his wife, Sara since 1994 and lives in Tallahassee. They have one son, Austin, who works at Universal Orlando.

In May of 2026, Dr. Murdaugh published his first book titled, Choose What You Want to Regret, sharing insights on leadership, decision-making, and embracing meaningful challenges in times of change. The book is available on Amazon, Barnes & Noble, and Books A Million.

== See also ==
- Florida Community Colleges System
