= Master jet base =

Naval air station

In the United States Navy, a master jet base is a naval air station with permanent basing and homeporting of carrier-based tactical jet squadrons (e.g., fighter, strike fighter, attack), carrier air wings, and the provision of one or more jet-capable naval outlying fields or auxiliary landing fields in relatively close proximity for use in concentrated Field Carrier Landing Practice (FCLP).

== Current operating ==
- Naval Air Station Lemoore - Lemoore, California
- Naval Air Station Oceana - Virginia Beach, Virginia
- Naval Air Station Whidbey Island - Whidbey Island, Washington

== Decommissioned ==
- Naval Air Station Cecil Field - Jacksonville, Florida, now the Cecil Airport
- Naval Air Station Sanford - Sanford, Florida, now the Orlando-Sanford International Airport

=== Originally slated as a Master Jet Base, but redirected to other missions (e.g., Maritime Patrol, Training, etc.), then decommissioned ===
- Naval Air Station Brunswick - Brunswick, Maine, now the Brunswick Executive Airport
- Naval Air Station Glynco - Brunswick, Georgia, formerly the Glynco Jetport, now the Brunswick Golden Isles Airport

== Transferred to another service ==
- Naval Air Station Miramar - San Diego, California, now Marine Corps Air Station Miramar

== See also ==
- List of established military terms
