= Tonjua Williams =

Dr. Tonjua Williams

7th President of St. Petersburg College
- Incumbent
- Assumed office July 3, 2017
- Preceded by: William D. Law

Personal details
- Education: Clearwater Christian College (BS); University of South Florida (MA); Barry University (PhD)
- Website: https://spcollege.edu/president

Dr. Tonjua Harris Williams is the current President of St. Petersburg College (SPC) in St. Petersburg, Florida, assuming the office in 2017.

== Biography ==
Williams was one of three children of her single mother, who encouraged them to study.

Williams began her career at St. Petersburg College in 1986 after earning her bachelor's degree in humanities from Clearwater Christian College. She earned another bachelor's degree in Business Administration from Clearwater Christian, then a master's degree in Counselor Education from the University of South Florida. She studied at the Adrian Dominican School of Education to gain her Ph.D. in Higher Education from Barry University.

After a nationwide search, Williams succeeded Dr. William D. Law as the 7th president of SPC on July 3, 2017. She was the first woman and first African American to be named president of the college. Before becoming president, Williams worked as a Coordinator for Student Support Services, Sr. Vice President for Student Services, Vice President for Academic and Student Affairs and Provost at the college's Tarpon Springs Campus. During that time, she initiated and oversaw several successful programs, including The College Experience student success initiative, which expanded partnerships between faculty and advisors, created an early alert system for struggling students and increased student visits to campus learning support centers.

== Professional organizations ==
Williams is an Aspen Institute Presidential Fellow, a coach for the American Association of Community College's (AACC) Guided Pathways initiative, a faculty resident for the Community College Center for Student Engagement (CCCSE) institutes and is affiliated with several state and national organizations, often in leadership roles.
