= Atlantic Southeast Airlines Flight 2311 =

1991 aviation accident in Georgia, US

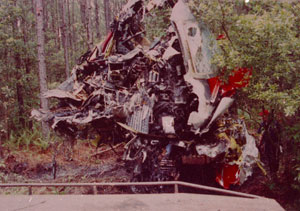
- Wreckage of the aircraft

Accident
- Date: April 5, 1991
- Summary: Propeller malfunction due to control system design flaw leading to loss of control
- Site: Dock Junction, near Glynco Jetport, Brunswick, Georgia, U.S.; 31°15′34.8″N 81°30′34.2″W

Aircraft
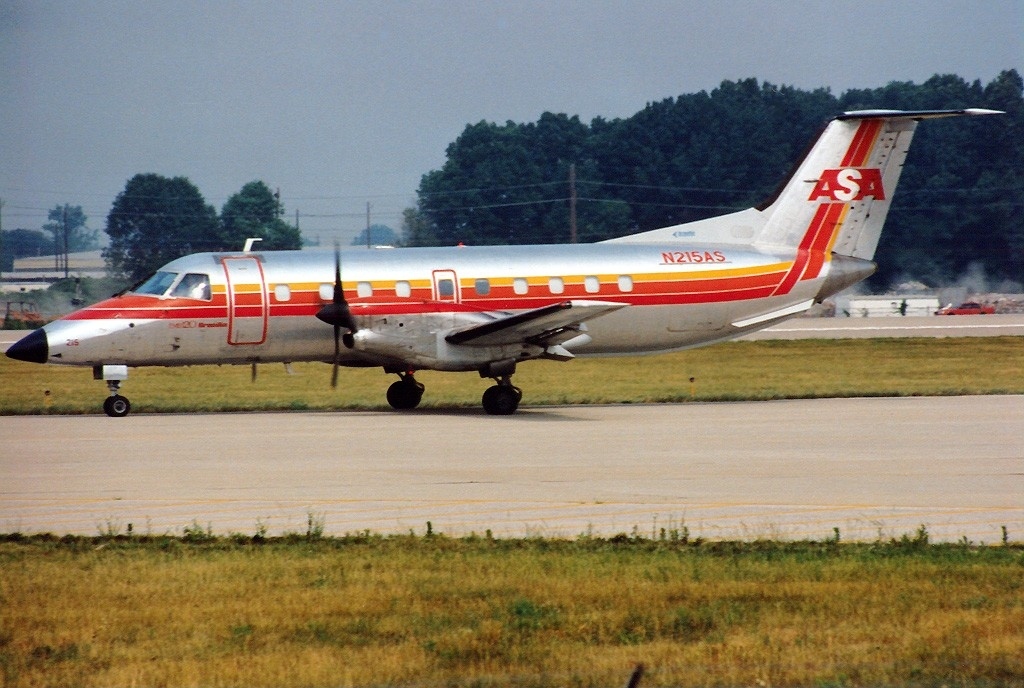
- An Atlantic Southeast Airlines Embraer EMB 120 Brasilia, similar to the one involved in the accident
- Aircraft type: Embraer EMB 120 Brasilia
- Operator: Atlantic Southeast Airlines on behalf of Delta Connection
- IATA flight No.: EV2311 / DL2311
- ICAO flight No.: ASE311
- Call sign: ACEY 311
- Registration: N270AS
- Flight origin: William B. Hartsfield International Airport, Atlanta, Georgia, United States
- Destination: Glynco Jetport, Brunswick, Georgia, United States
- Occupants: 23
- Passengers: 20
- Crew: 3
- Fatalities: 23
- Survivors: 0

Atlantic Southeast Airlines Flight 2311 was a regularly scheduled commuter flight in Georgia in the southeastern United States, from Hartsfield–Jackson Atlanta International Airport to Glynco Jetport (since renamed Brunswick Golden Isles Airport) in Brunswick on April 5, 1991.

The flight, operating a twin-turboprop Embraer EMB 120 Brasilia, crashed north of Brunswick while approaching the airport for landing. All twenty-three aboard were killed, including astronaut Sonny Carter and former U.S. Senator John Tower.

Four years later, another Embraer Brasilia of ASA crashed in the Georgia countryside in similar circumstances, with nine fatalities.

== Background ==
=== Aircraft ===
The aircraft involved was an Embraer EMB 120 Brasilia (registration number N270AS), manufactured on November 30, 1990. Equipped with two Pratt & Whitney Canada PW118 engines and Hamilton Standard 14RF-9 propellers, it received its U.S. standard airworthiness certificate on December 20, 1990. In service less than four months, the aircraft had accumulated about 816 flying hours and 845 cycles prior to the accident.

Only one deferred maintenance item was noted in the maintenance logs, for fuel leaking from the auxiliary power unit (APU) cowling. The circuit breaker for the APU had been pulled while spare parts could be made available to fix the cowling. Because they were not required at the time, the aircraft did not have a cockpit voice recorder or flight data recorder.

=== Flight crew ===
Captain Mark Friedline, thirty-four years old, had been hired by Atlantic Southeast Airlines ten years earlier in May 1981, and was fully qualified to fly three different commercial aircraft, including the EMB-120. At the time of the accident, he had accumulated an estimated 11,724 total flying hours, of which 5,720 hours were in the EMB-120. Friedline had been involved in the development of the EMB-120, and its introduction to service in the United States, and was trained to fly the aircraft by the manufacturer. An inspector described his knowledge of aircraft systems as "extensive," and his pilot techniques as "excellent."

First Officer Hank Johnston, thirty-six, was hired by Atlantic Southeast Airlines in June 1988, and was a qualified flight instructor. Because more than six months had passed since he had undergone an FAA medical inspection and been issued a first-class certificate, it automatically reverted to a second-class certificate, adequate for his duties as a first officer. At the time of the accident, Johnston had accumulated about 3,925 total flying hours, of which 2,795 hours were in the EMB-120.

== Accident ==
On the morning of the accident, the captain and first officer arrived at the Dothan Regional Airport by taxi about 6:15 Eastern Standard Time. The taxi cab driver reported that the crew was in good spirits and readily engaged in conversation. The crew flew first to Atlanta, then performed a round trip to Montgomery, Alabama, before returning to Atlanta. After this round trip, the crew had a scheduled break for around two and a half hours, in which they were described as well-rested and talkative.

Flight 2311 was scheduled initially to be operated by N228AS, another EMB-120. This airplane experienced mechanical problems, so the flight was switched to N270AS. This aircraft had flown four times already on the day of the accident, with no reports of any problems. N270AS departed Atlanta, operating ASA Flight 2311, at 13:47, twenty-three minutes behind schedule.

Flight 2311 deviated slightly in its flight path to Brunswick to avoid poor weather. Just after 14:48, the flight crew acknowledged to the Jacksonville air route traffic control center that the airport was in sight, and Flight 2311 was subsequently cleared for a visual approach to Glynco Jetport on runway 7, which the flight crew acknowledged.

The last transmission received from Flight 2311 was to the ASA manager at the airport, who reported that the flight made an "in-range call" on the company radio frequency, and that the pilot gave no indication that the flight had any mechanical problems. Witnesses reported seeing the aircraft approaching the airport in visual meteorological conditions at a much lower than normal altitude. Several witnesses estimated that the aircraft flew over them at an altitude of 100 to 200 feet (30 to 60 m) above the ground.

According to most of the interviewed witnesses, the airplane suddenly rolled to the left until the wings were perpendicular to the ground. The aircraft then descended in a nose-down attitude and disappeared from sight behind trees near the airport. One witness told investigators that they saw a puff of smoke emanate from the aircraft prior to or subsequent to the airplane rolling to the left. Others reported loud engine noises described as a squeal, whine, or an overspeeding or accelerating engine during the last moments of the flight, although they said that these noises seemed to have stopped, or at least faded before the aircraft impacted with flat ground two miles short of the runway.

One witness interviewed by the NTSB, a pilot driving on a road southwest of the airport, told investigators that he saw the airplane in normal flight at normal altitudes, and that he believed that the approach was not abnormal. The airplane completed a 180° turn from the downwind leg of the approach and continued the turn. He then saw the aircraft pitch slightly, before it rolled to the left until the wings were vertical. The airplane then turned nose-down and smashed into the ground. He saw no fire or smoke during the flight, and he believed both propellers were rotating.

There were twenty passengers on board, including former U.S. Senator John Tower from Texas (head of the Tower Commission for the Iran–Contra affair) and astronaut Manley "Sonny" Carter. All twenty-three passengers and crew died in the accident.

== Investigation ==
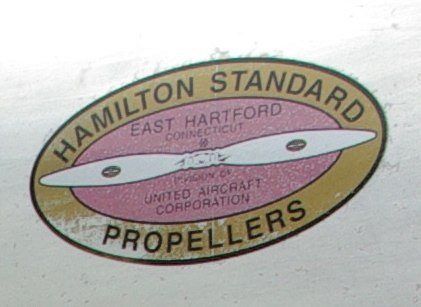
The logo of Hamilton Standard, which manufactured the defective propeller control unit

An investigation carried out by the National Transportation Safety Board (NTSB) initially determined that a malfunction of the flight control surfaces, including a rudder or ailerons hardover or asymmetric flaps, could not have caused the accident, after multiple pilots in simulators managed to keep the aircraft under control. Engine failure was also ruled out by detailed inspection of the two engines. The investigators found that the "circumstances of this accident indicate that a severe asymmetric thrust condition caused a left roll that led to loss of control of the airplane. The NTSB's investigation examined all the possible events that could have caused the loss of control. The powerplant and propeller examinations indicated that the engines were operating normally, but that a propeller system malfunction occurred", which allowed the left propeller's angles to be oriented nearly perpendicular to the direction of flight, resulting in insufficient thrust and higher drag on the left side.

The NTSB conducted a test flight in an EMB-120 with the left engine having the propeller control mechanism set to a similar mechanical condition, but blocking the propeller blades from moving below 22° to not endanger the flight crew. The flight crew was found to be unable to perceive any problem with the airplane until the propeller blade angle was between 24 and 26°. They stated that the airplane would have "become very difficult to control after the propeller reached the 22° stop, so the pilots of flight 2311 most likely did not notice a problem with the airplane until the propeller began to overspeed and roll control was affected." Thus, the flight crew would have been unable to declare an emergency, as the event was so sudden. The crashed aircraft's left engine propeller blades went to 3° instead of the commanded 79.2° for feathering.

The NTSB's final report, while acknowledging that Atlantic Southeast's practice of overworking pilots (the pilots only received an estimated five to six hours of sleep in violation of federal aviation regulations) played no direct part in the accident, still raised concerns that the airline, along with other commuter airline corporations, "scheduled reduced rest periods for about 60% of the layovers in its day-to-day operations. The NTSB believes that this practice is inconsistent with the level of safety intended by the regulations, which is to allow reduced rest periods as a contingency to a schedule disruption, and has the potential of adversely affecting pilot fitness and performance."

=== Probable cause ===
On April 28, 1992, the NTSB published its final accident report, including its determination of the cause of the accident:

The National Transportation Safety Board determines that the probable cause of this accident was the loss of control in flight as a result of a malfunction of the left engine propeller control unit, which allowed the propeller blade angles to go below the flight idle position. Contributing to the accident was the deficient design of the propeller control unit by Hamilton Standard and the approval of the design by the Federal Aviation Administration. The design did not correctly evaluate the failure mode that occurred during this flight, which resulted in an uncommanded and uncorrectable movement of the blades of the airplane's left propeller below the flight idle position.

== Depictions in media ==
The Discovery Channel Canada / National Geographic TV series Mayday (also called Air Crash Investigation, Air Emergency or Air Disasters) dramatized the accident in a 2016 episode titled "Steep Impact".

== See also ==
- Atlantic Southeast Airlines Flight 529
- List of accidents and incidents involving commercial aircraft
