= Sonny Carter =

American astronaut, chemist, and U.S. Navy officer (1947–1991)

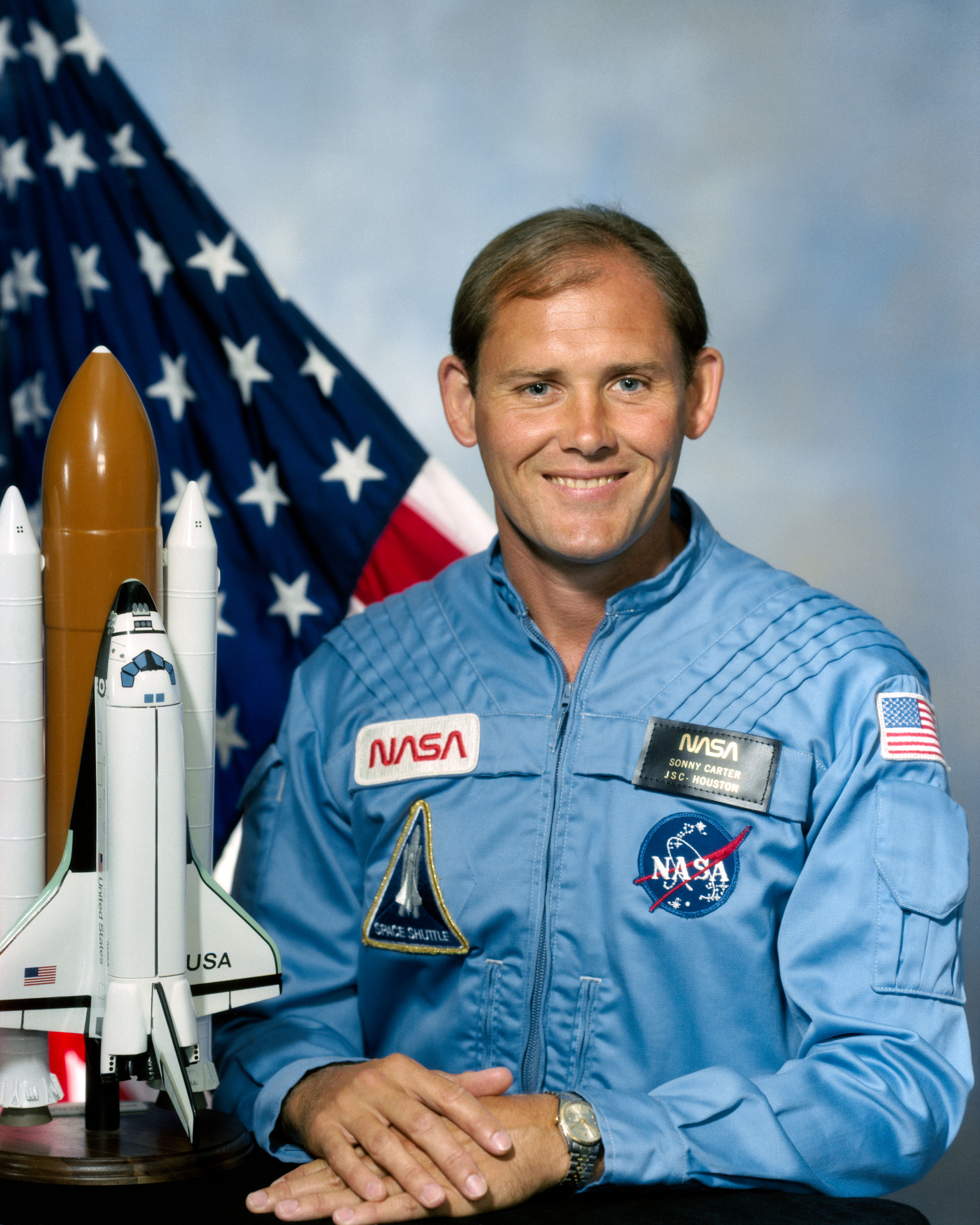
- Carter's official NASA portrait, 1984
- Born: Manley Lanier Carter Jr. August 15, 1947; Macon, Georgia, U.S.
- Died: April 5, 1991 (aged 43); Brunswick, Georgia, U.S.
- Education: Emory University (BA, MD)
- Awards: Air Medal
- Space career
- Rank: Captain, USN
- Time in space: 5d 0h 6m
- Selection: NASA Group 10 (1984)
- Mission: STS-33
Association football career
- Position: Defender
Senior career*
Years	Team	Apps	(Gls)
1970–1972	Atlanta Chiefs	13	(0)
Total		13	(0)
- * Club domestic league appearances and goals

Manley Lanier "Sonny" Carter Jr., M.D. (August 15, 1947 – April 5, 1991), (Capt, USN), was an American physician, professional soccer player, naval officer, aviator, and NASA astronaut who flew on STS-33.

== Early life and education ==
Carter was born on August 15, 1947, to parents Manley L. Carter and Elizabeth C. Carter in Macon, Georgia, but considered Warner Robins, Georgia, to be his hometown. He graduated from Lanier High School in Macon in 1965, and during his high school years was actively involved in the Macon-based Troop 19 of the Boy Scouts of America, where he also served a term as Senior Patrol Leader, the highest leadership position for a young man in that BSA troop, and earned its highest rank of Eagle Scout.

Carter received a Bachelor of Arts degree in chemistry from Emory University in Atlanta in 1969, and a Doctor of Medicine degree from there in 1973. During his time at Emory, Carter was a brother in the Alpha Tau Omega fraternity. After completing Emory University School of Medicine in 1973, Carter completed internship in internal medicine at Grady Memorial Hospital in Atlanta.

== Athletic career ==
Carter played collegiate soccer and ran track while an undergraduate at Emory University. During his senior season, he was captain and most valuable player of the soccer team. In addition to his intercollegiate athletic career, Carter was an intramural wrestling champion. He played professional soccer while he attended medical school. In 1970, he signed with the Atlanta Chiefs of the North American Soccer League (NASL), for which he played three seasons.

== Navy service ==
In 1974, Carter entered the U.S. Navy and completed flight surgeon school in Pensacola, Florida. After serving tours as a flight surgeon with the 1st and 3rd Marine Aircraft Wings, he returned to flight training at Beeville, Texas, and was designated a Naval Aviator on April 28, 1978. He was assigned the senior medical officer of the aircraft carrier USS Forrestal, and in March 1979 completed F-4 training at VMFAT-101 in Marine Corps Air Station Yuma, Arizona. He was subsequently reassigned as a fighter pilot, flying F-4 Phantoms with Marine Fighter Attack Squadron 333 (VMFA-333) at MCAS Beaufort, South Carolina. In 1981, he completed a nine-month Mediterranean cruise aboard USS Forrestal with VMFA-115. In September 1982, he attended U.S. Navy Fighter Weapons School (TOPGUN) and then served as the 2nd Marine Aircraft Wing standardization officer and F-4 combat readiness evaluator at MCAS Cherry Point, North Carolina. He then attended the U.S. Naval Test Pilot School, graduating in June 1984.

Carter logged 3,000 flying hours and 160 carrier landings.

== NASA career ==
Selected by NASA in May 1984, Carter became an astronaut in June 1985, qualified for assignment as a mission specialist on future Space Shuttle flight crews.

=== Space Shuttle program ===
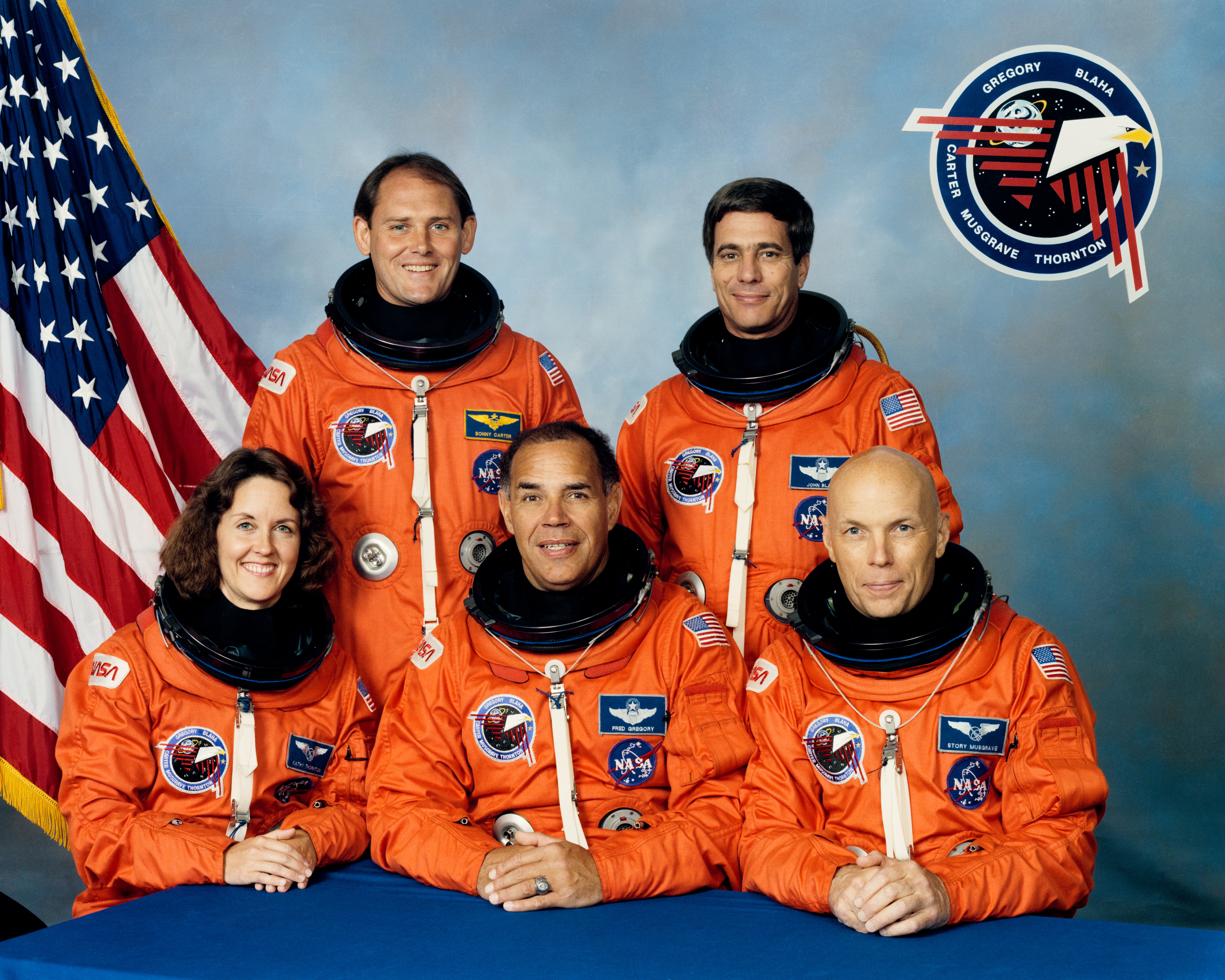
Sonny Carter (standing row, left) with his STS-33 crewmates

Carter was assigned as Extra-vehicular activity (EVA) Representative for the Mission Development Branch of the Astronaut Office when selected to the crew of STS-33. The STS-33 crew launched from Kennedy Space Center, Florida, at night on November 22, 1989, aboard the Space Shuttle Discovery. The mission carried Department of Defense payloads and other secondary payloads. After 79 orbits of the Earth, this five-day mission concluded on November 27, 1989, with a hard surface landing on Runway 04 at Edwards Air Force Base, California. Carter logged 120 hours in space.

At the time of his death in April 1991, Carter was assigned as mission specialist 3 on the crew of STS-42 Discovery, the first International Microgravity Laboratory (IML-1). His place was taken by Dave Hilmers.

== Death ==
Carter died in the April 5, 1991, crash of Atlantic Southeast Airlines Flight 2311 in Brunswick, Georgia. He was aboard the commercial airplane traveling for NASA. His wife Dana and two daughters, Olivia Elizabeth (born May 27, 1974) and Meredith Corvette (born December 3, 1976), were not on the flight. Among the others who also died in the plane crash was John Tower, a former senator from Texas.

Carter's death occurred on the same day as the launch of the Space Shuttle Atlantis on mission STS-37.

== Organizations ==
Carter was a member of the Society of U.S. Naval Flight Surgeons, Sigma Delta Psi, Alpha Omega Alpha, Alpha Tau Omega, the Marine Corps Aviation Association, the Tailhook Association, and the Society of Experimental Test Pilots.

== Special honors ==
- Air Medal
- Meritorious Service Medal
- Navy Achievement Medal
- Meritorious Unit Citation
- Marine Corps Aviation Association Special Category Award (1982)
- NASA Meritorious Service Medal (1988)
- NASA Space Flight Medal (1989)

Carter was the guest of honor at the 215th Marine Corps Birthday Ball.

== Legacy ==
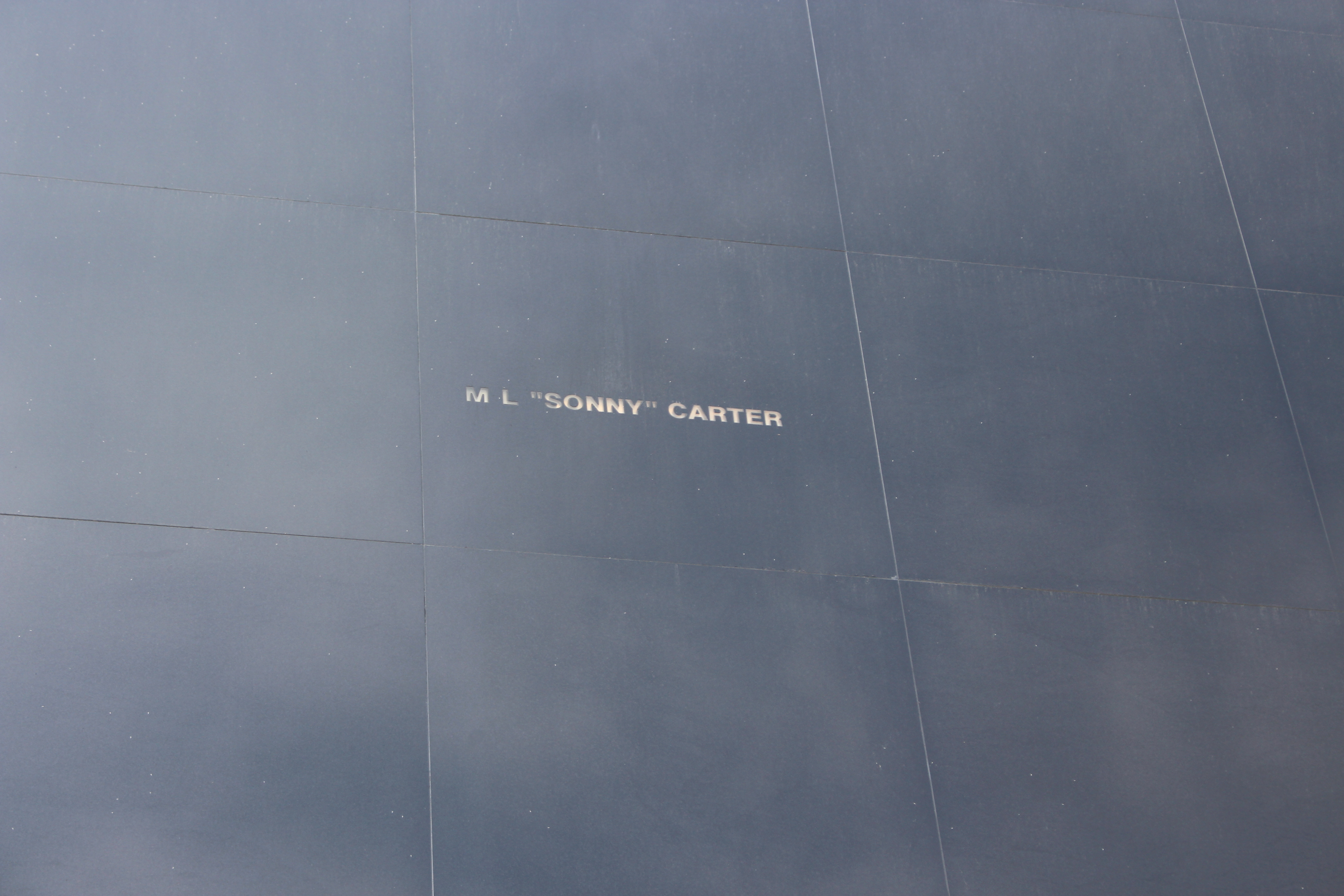
Space Mirror Memorial Sonny Carter

Having died in the line of duty for NASA, Carter's name was added to the Space Mirror Memorial at Kennedy Space Center Visitor Complex in Merritt Island, Florida. His name was the first added after the memorial's original construction.

After his death, his name was given to the Sonny Carter Training Facility Neutral Buoyancy Laboratory, NASA's underwater astronaut training facility, for which he had developed training techniques.

In 1989, Emory University inducted him in its Athletic Hall of Fame. The university holds The Sonny Carter Invitational each year in his honor. A plaque also honors his memory in the library of the Alpha Tau Omega fraternity house at Emory, in which he was a Brother.

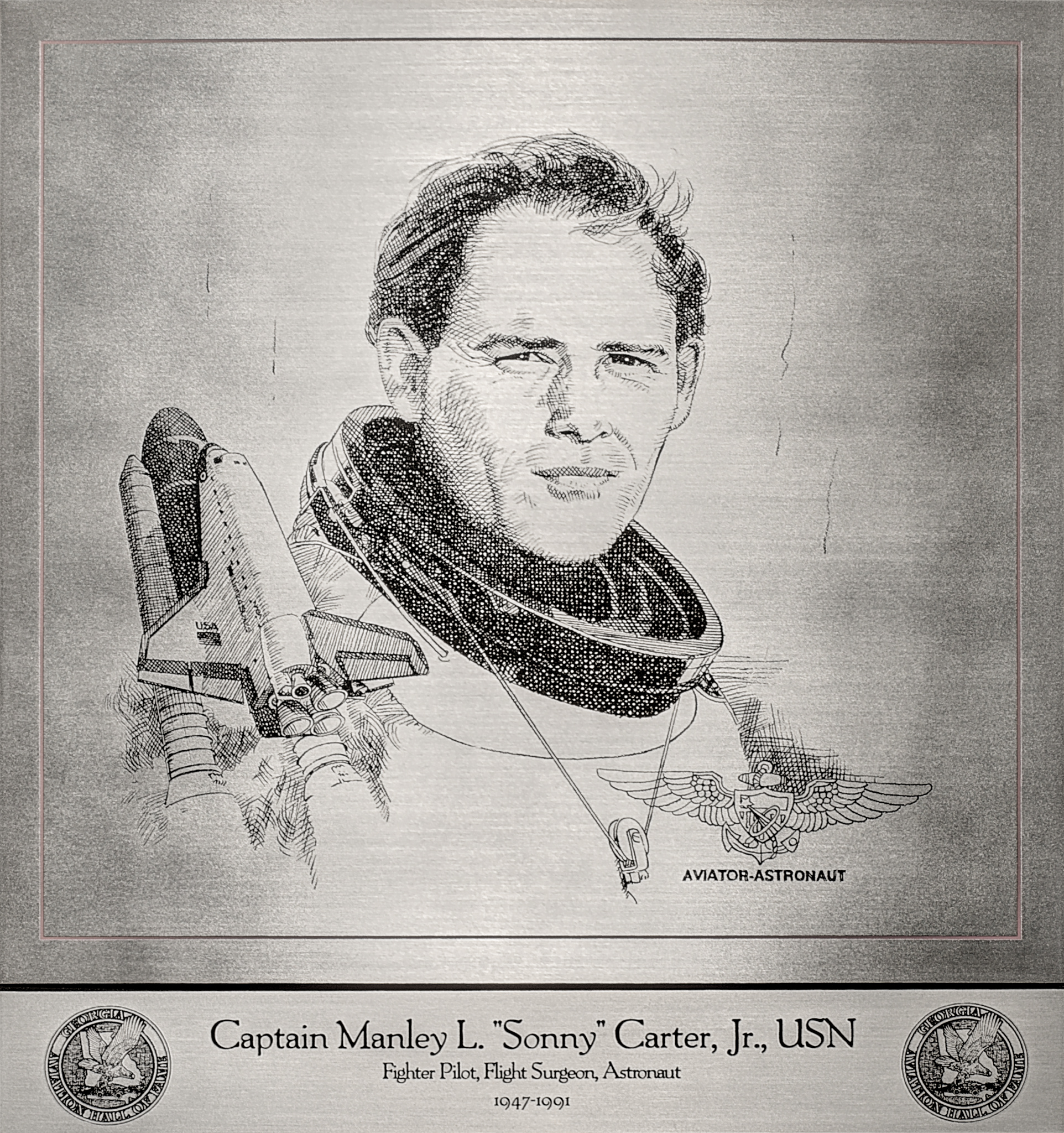
Plaque of Carter at the Georgia Aviation Hall of Fame

In 1992 he was inducted into the Georgia Aviation Hall of Fame.

Sonny Carter Elementary School in Macon, Georgia, which opened in 1993, was named for Carter. The school motto is: "To Challenge the Edge of the Universe."

The Society of United States Naval Flight Surgeons (SUSNFS) bestows an annual "Sonny Carter Memorial Award" to the nominee with the most significant contribution to the health, safety and welfare of the operational forces by promoting communication and teamwork amongst the aeromedical community.

== Physical description ==
- Weight: 165 lb (75 kg)
- Height: 6 ft ½ in (1.84 m)
- Hair: Brown
- Eyes: Blue
