= James F. Sirmons =

American broadcasting executive (1917–2018)

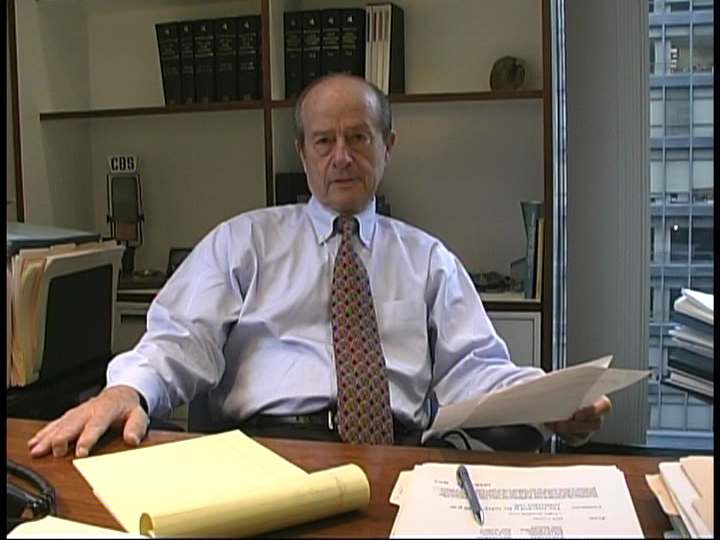
- Sirmons in August 2000
- Born: James Franklin Sirmons; December 16, 1917; St. Petersburg, Florida, U.S.
- Died: April 20, 2018 (aged 100); St. Petersburg, Florida, U.S.
- Occupation(s): Executive vice president, CBS
- Spouse: Virginia Louise Gorgas
- Parent(s): Benjamin Franklin Sirmons; Pearl Estelle Barfield

James Franklin Sirmons (December 16, 1917 – April 20, 2018) was an American broadcasting executive who worked for CBS from 1942 to 2000, first in radio operations and later in labor and industrial relations.

== Early life and education ==
Sirmons was born December 16, 1917, in St. Petersburg, Florida, to Benjamin Franklin Sirmons and Pearl Estelle Barfield. He attended St. Petersburg College (then called St. Petersburg Junior College) in St. Petersburg, Florida, in 1935-1937, and then the University of Florida, in Gainesville, Florida, in 1937–1941, where he studied law.

== Career ==
In early 1940, he accepted his first job at CBS affiliate WCKY in Cincinnati, Ohio, working on a morning radio show called The Hot Coffee Club. Soon afterward, in late 1940 he joined WFMJ in Youngstown, Ohio, as an announcer and production manager. He met his future wife, Virginia Gorgas, while working there. "James Sirmons, chief announcer of WFMJ, Youngstown, recently married Virginia Gorgas, whom he meet when she entered the television contest staged during the RCA television show in Youngstown last April. Miss Gorgas, however, failed to win a contest prize."

== CBS Radio Network ==
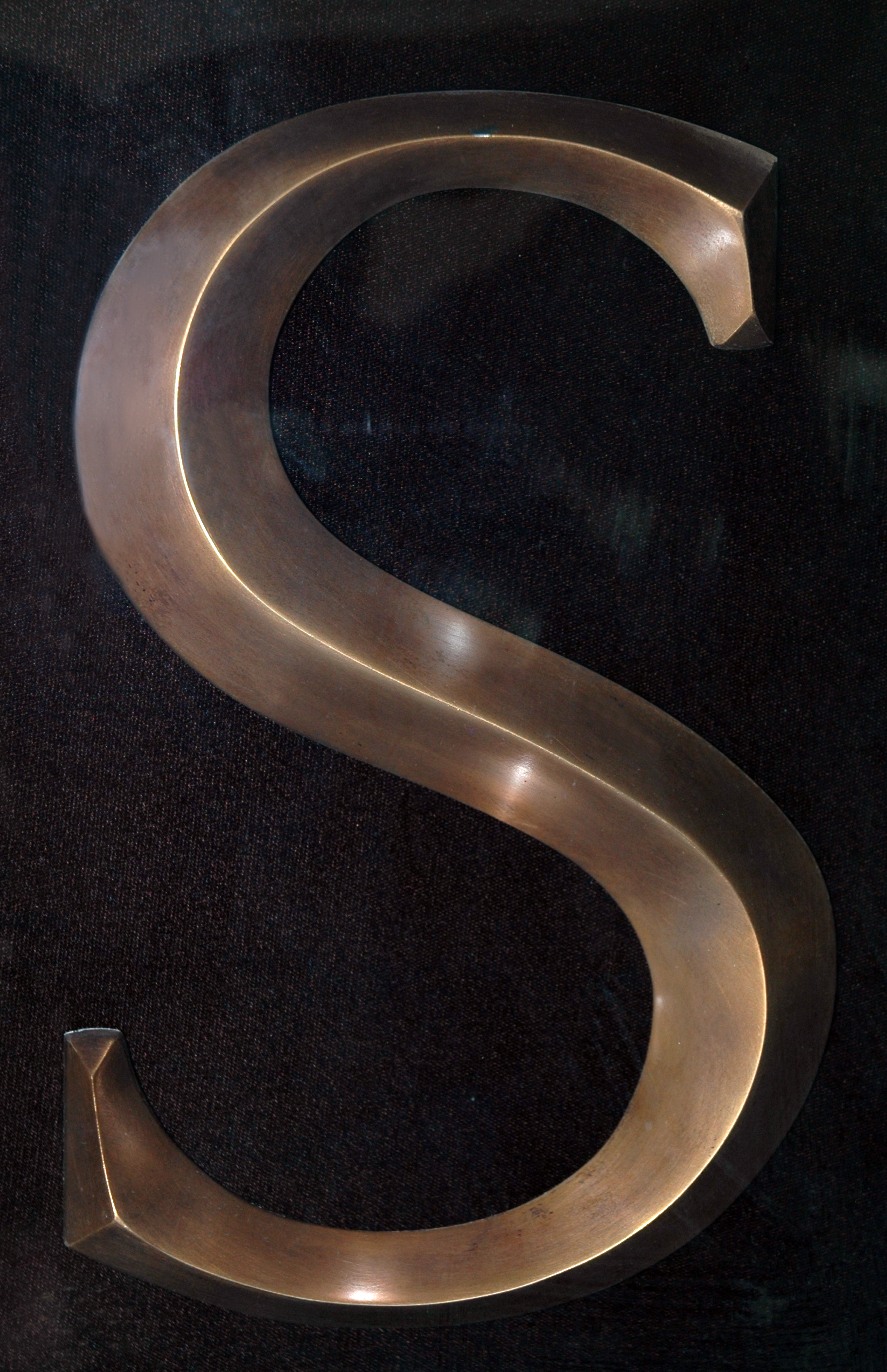
Bronze "S" from the original Columbia Broadcasting Systems building mounted as a plaque for James F. Sirmons on the occasion of his 50 years of service to CBS Inc, 1992.

In early 1942, there was an opening for a Production Supervisor for the CBS Radio Network in New York City. Newly married, and with the U.S. entering World War II, he accepted the night shift and managed announcers, directors, musicians and other crew and talent for live radio broadcasts.

He worked closely with CBS co-founder and president Frank Stanton, vice president of CBS News Edward R. Murrow, and broadcast journalists Eric Sevareid, John Charles Daly, George Herman, Richard C. Hottelet, William L. Shirer, Lowell Thomas, and others. He helped to manage the live report on D-Day on June 6, 1944, and the first live televised presidential election in progress (Truman vs Dewey, November 3, 1948).

In 194,9 he was promoted to Operations Manager. During these years he also taught broadcasting courses at NYU. One of his students, Larry King, accredited Sirmons as one of the people who helped set him on the right path to becoming a broadcaster.

== Industrial Relations ==
In 1957, Sirmons was promoted to Assistant Director of Labor Relations at CBS, reporting to the first vice president of that department, William C. Fitts. He was then promoted in 1961 to Director of Labor Relations.

Upon the retirement of Mr. Fitts in 1969, Sirmons was promoted to Vice President of Employee Relations, and then in 1971 became Vice President of Personnel and Labor Relations at CBS.

In 1981 he was promoted to Senior Vice President of Industrial Relations, and finally in 1994 promoted to Executive Vice President of Industrial Relations.

By the time of his retirement in 2000, he had worked for 58 years at CBS and was responsible for over 200 labor agreements in broadcasting.

== AFTRA Health & Retirement Funds ==
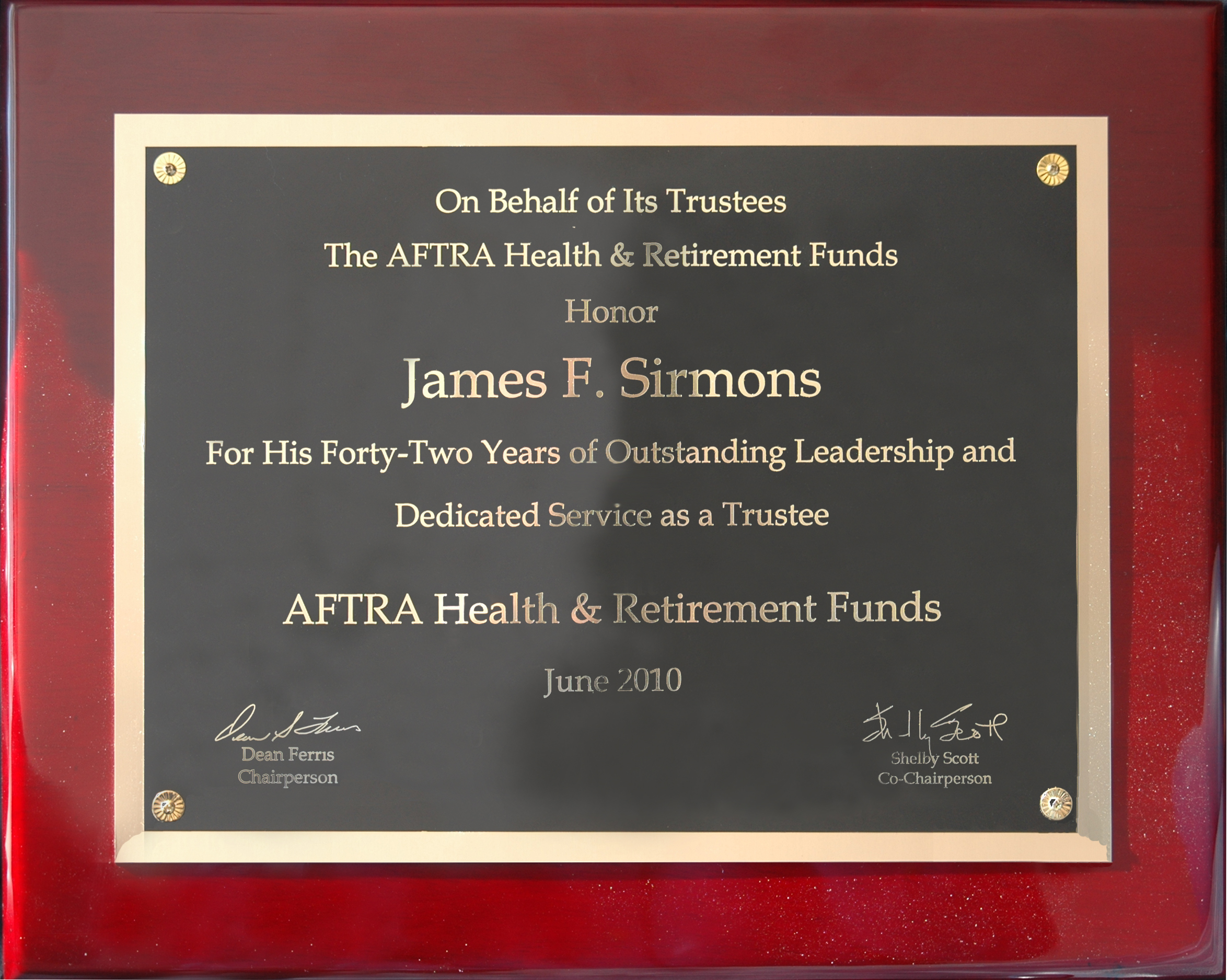
James F. Sirmons plaque from AFTRA Health & Retirement Funds

In 1968, Sirmons was elected to the Board of Directors at AFTRA Health & Retirement Funds, and in 1970 was elected chairman, a position he held until 2001 when he finally resigned as chairman. He resigned the board in 2009. During his 48 year tenure he negotiated 61 contracts with AFTRA.

== Death ==
Sirmons died peacefully in his home in St. Petersburg, Florida, on April 20, 2018, at 100 years, 4 months and 4 days old.

== Accolades ==
- 1973: Merit Award, United Fund of Greater New York
- American Broadcast Pioneer, Broadcasters' Foundation of America
- 2008: Outstanding Alumnus Award, St. Petersburg College Alumni Association, Inc.

Business positions
Preceded by William C. Fitts	Vice President of Labor / Industrial Relations; 1969-2000	Succeeded by Harry Isaacs
