= William D. Law =

Dr. William D. Law

6th President of St. Petersburg College
- In office June 7, 2010 – June 30, 2017
- Preceded by: Carl M. Kuttler, Jr.
- Succeeded by: Tonjua Williams

President of Tallahassee Community College
- In office 2002–2009
- Preceded by: T. K. Wetherell
- Succeeded by: Jim Murdaugh

Personal details
- Education: Florida State University; LeMoyne College

Dr. William D. "Bill" Law is the former president of St. Petersburg College. An American academic and former community college administrator. He resigned as President of St. Petersburg College in St. Petersburg, Florida effective July 1, 2017.

== Biography ==
Law graduated with a Bachelor's degree in English from LeMoyne College. He received his Master's degree and Doctorate in design and management of postsecondary education from Florida State University.

Law began his career as staff director of Committee on Higher Education of the Florida House of Representatives and worked for the Florida Board of Regents. In 1981 he became the vice president of Institutional and Program Planning at St. Petersburg College (then St. Petersburg Junior College), where he worked until 1988.

From 1988 to 1992, he was president of Lincoln Land Community College in Springfield, Illinois. He was the founding president of Montgomery College just outside Houston, serving in that role from 1992 to 2002, and president of Tallahassee Community College from 2002 to 2010.

In 2010 Law became the sixth president of St. Petersburg College, following the unexpected retirement of Carl M. Kuttler, Jr. In November 2016, he announced his resignation effective July 1, 2017.

Along with Ambassador Allan J. Katz, Law co-founded nonprofit The Village Square.

== Personal ==
Law is an avid runner and has completed over two dozen marathons, including five Boston Marathons. He and his wife Pat are the parents of two adult sons.

== See also ==
- Florida Community Colleges System
