= Brunswick Golden Isles Airport =

Airport serving Brunswick, Georgia, United States

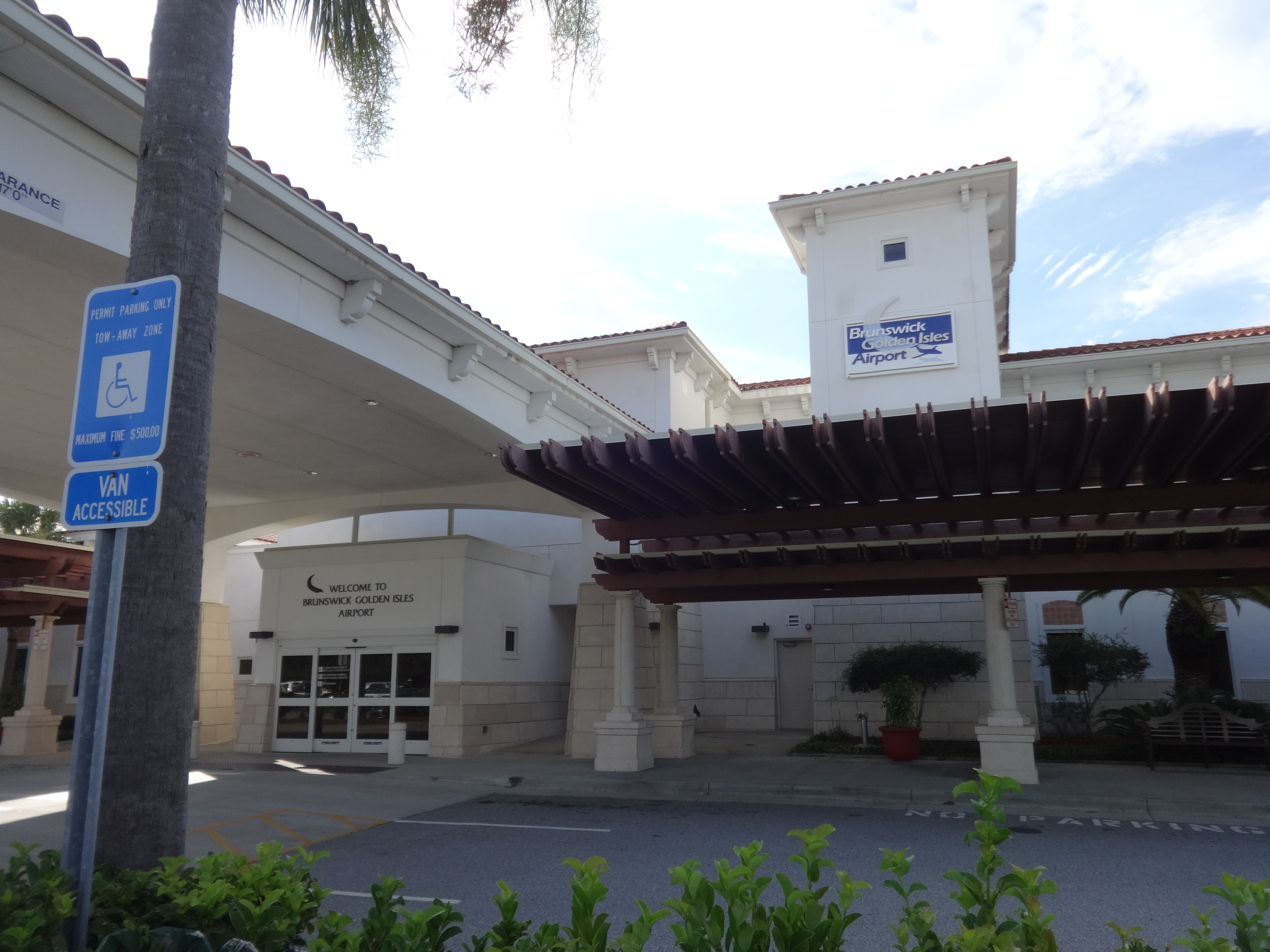
- Brunswick Golden Isles Airport in 2015
- IATA: BQK; ICAO: KBQK; FAA LID: BQK

Summary
- Airport type: Public
- Owner: Glynn County
- Serves: Brunswick, Georgia
- Elevation AMSL: 26 ft (7.9 m)
- Coordinates: 31°15′32″N 081°27′59″W
- Website: flygcairports.com

Map
- Location within Georgia Location within the United States

Runways
Direction	Length		Surface
Direction	ft	m	Surface
7/25	8,001	2,439	Asphalt/Concrete

Statistics (2022)
- Passengers (2020): 38,109
- Aircraft operations (year ending 6/1/2022): 20,914
- Based aircraft: 28
- Source: Airport Statistics, Federal Aviation Administration

Brunswick Golden Isles Airport (IATA: BQK, ICAO: KBQK, FAA LID: BQK), previously known as Glynco Jetport, is a county-owned public-use airport located five nautical miles (9 km) north of the central business district of Brunswick, a city in Glynn County, Georgia, United States. It is mostly used for general aviation, but is also served by one commercial airline, Delta.

== History ==
Before 1975, the airport was Naval Air Station Glynco (IATA: NEA, ICAO: KNEA). In August 1942, the U.S. Navy began building the air station on 2,400 acres (970 ha) in the northern part of the county. NAS Glynco was a base for lighter-than-air airships, known as blimps. In 1973, Delta Air Lines began flying passengers on its McDonnell Douglas DC-9-30s directly from Glynco to Atlanta and Orlando, as well as to Augusta, Jacksonville and Macon (the Augusta and Macon flights continued to Atlanta). By June 1974, Delta was no longer flying out of the airport. Atlantic Southeast Airlines (ASA) began serving the airport in 1981 with nonstop flights to Atlanta. In 1984, ASA began code sharing with Delta, operating as Delta Connection (and marking a return of Delta service to Brunswick). ASA flew Embraer EMB 110 Bandeirantes, Short 360s, and Embraer EMB 120 Brasilias nonstop from Atlanta. In 2002, the carrier introduced regional jet service to the airport with the Bombardier CRJ100/200. ASA's service was later replaced by Endeavor Air, which continues as of 2026 to provide service to Brunswick as Delta Connection using CRJ-200 regional jets. Meanwhile, ASA had been purchased by SkyWest Airlines and today both SkyWest and Endeavor operate Delta Connection service to Atlanta. Flights were upgraded to larger CRJ-700 and CRJ-900 regional jets in 2023.

Earlier, Delta served Brunswick via the McKinnon St. Simons Island Airport from the mid 1940s through the 1960s using Douglas DC-3 and Convair 440 prop aircraft. Air South then served Brunswick through the St. Simons Island Airport through the 1970s until ending service by 1981.

When the Navy began preparing to close its station in Glynco, a group of nineteen Glynn County community leaders formed the Glynco Steering Committee to attract new users to the soon-to-be empty facility. In 1975, the Federal Law Enforcement Training Centers (FLETC) selected the naval air station site for a consolidated training academy for federal law enforcement personnel. FLETC constructed their facility on the former blimp facility, while the community retained the airfield proper and its runway, which was designated the official county municipal airport in 1975. Both developments proved to be invaluable to the future of Brunswick and the Golden Isles. Contributions to the local economy and population of Glynn County by FLETC have exceeded even the Navy's considerable impact, and the 8,001-foot (2,439 m) jet runway has also proved to be an important community asset.

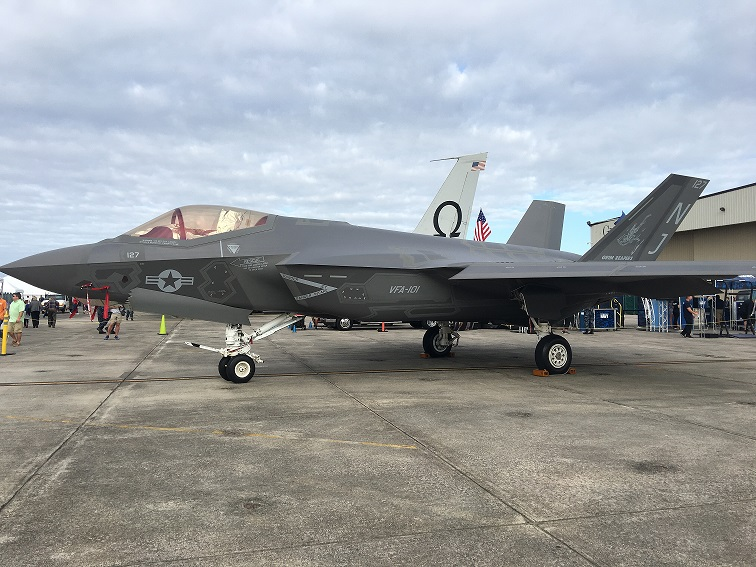
F-35C of VFA-101 Golden Isles Airshow on March 24, 2017

The Glynn County Airport Commission was established in 1980 to manage and develop new opportunities for both the Brunswick and St. Simons Island airports. Since that time, the airport commission has sought to improve service and facilities through a series of upgrades and repairs. The Glynco Jetport was renamed Brunswick Golden Isles Airport in 2003 and a new passenger terminal was completed in 2005.

The airport has been host to several air shows. The most recent was Wings over the Golden Isles, held between March 24 and 26, 2017.

== Facilities and aircraft ==
Brunswick Golden Isles Airport covers an area of 2,003 acres and sits at an elevation of twenty-six feet above mean sea level. It has one runway designated 7/25 with an 8,001 by 150 feet asphalt and concrete surface.

For the twelve-month period ending June 1, 2022, the airport had 20,914 aircraft operations, an average of fifty-seven per day: 87% general aviation, 6% air taxi, 5% scheduled commercial and 2% military. At that time there were twenty-eight aircraft based at this airport: twenty-six single-engine, and two multi-engine.

== Airline and destination ==
Airlines	Destinations
Delta Connection	Atlanta

Delta Connection service is currently operated by Endeavor Air with Bombardier CRJ-700/900 regional jet aircraft.

Destination map
Destination from Brunswick Golden Isles Airport

=== Destination statistics ===
Busiest domestic routes from BQK (2020)
Rank	City	Passengers
1	Atlanta, Georgia	38,109

== Incidents and accidents ==
On Friday, April 5, 1991, Atlantic Southeast Airlines Flight 2311 crashed while on approach to runway 7; all twenty passengers and three crew perished.

== See also ==
- Glynco, Georgia
- List of airports in Georgia (U.S. state)
