= Glynco, Georgia =

- Interactive map of Glynco, Georgia
- Coordinates: 31°15′31″N 81°27′58″W
- Country: United States
- State: Georgia
- County: Glynn
- Named after: Glynn County, Georgia

Glynco is an area in Glynn County, Georgia located on the northwestern edge of Brunswick, Georgia. Glynco is a portmanteau of the words "Glynn County".

== History ==
In 1942, Naval Air Station Glynco was established in what is now Glynco. When the air station was closed in 1974, 2,003 acres (8.11 km^{2}) of the land (including its runway) was used for the Brunswick Golden Isles Airport and 1,500 acres (6.1 km^{2}) of it for the headquarters of the Federal Law Enforcement Training Center (FLETC). FLETC has its own United States Postal Service ZIP code, 31524. The US Census lists Glynn County, Georgia as having 85,219 residents.
