= McKinnon St. Simons Island Airport =

Airport serving St. Simons Island, Georgia, United States

Coordinates: 31°09′07″N 081°23′29″W

St. Simons Island Airport at McKinnon Field

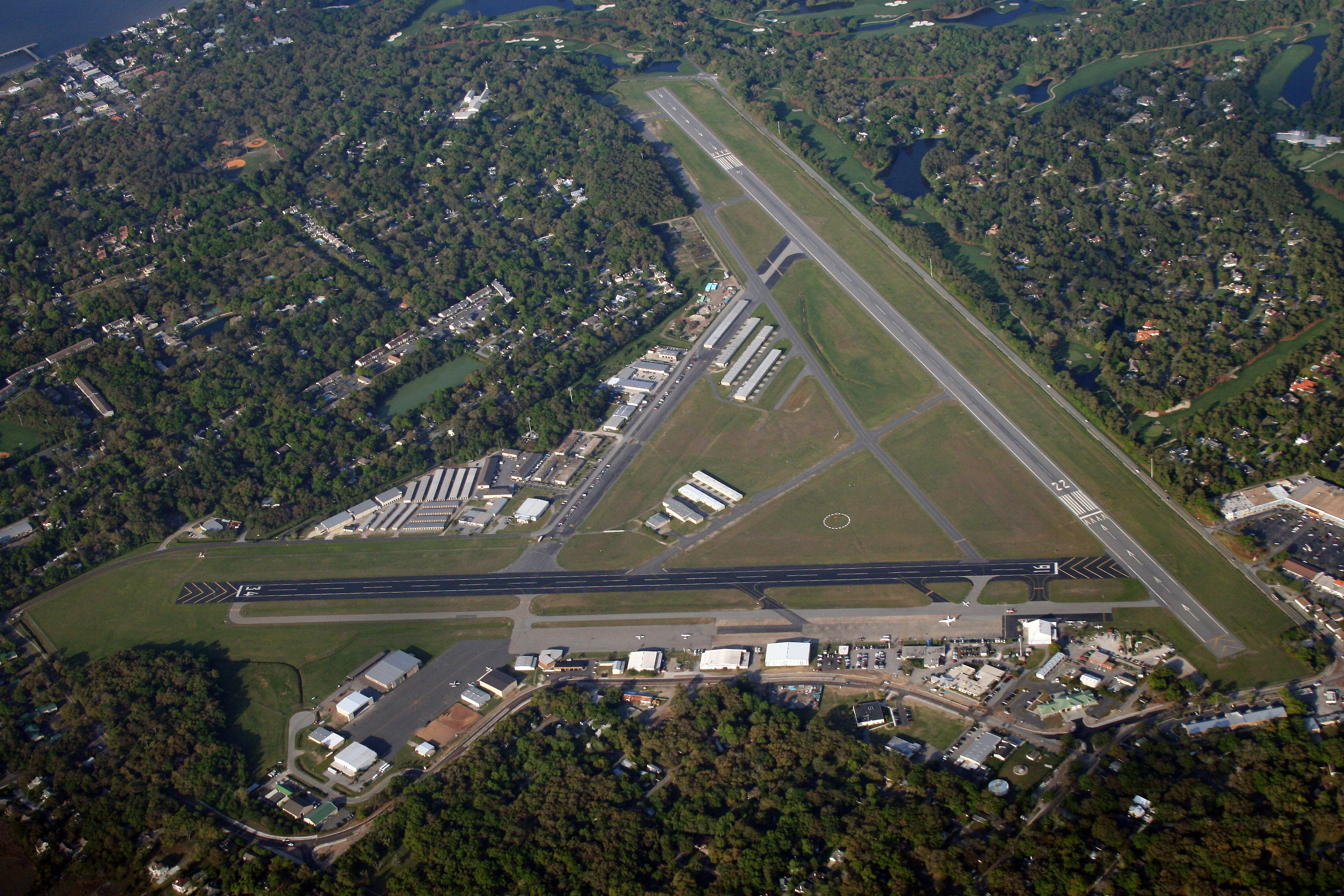
- St. Simons Island Airport in 2008
- IATA: SSI; ICAO: KSSI; FAA LID: SSI

Summary
- Airport type: Public
- Owner: Glynn County
- Serves: Brunswick, Georgia
- Location: St. Simons Island
- Elevation AMSL: 19 ft / 6 m
- Website: flygcairports.com

Map

Runways
Direction	Length		Surface
Direction	ft	m	Surface
4/22	5,584	1,702	Asphalt
16/34	3,313	1,010	Asphalt

Statistics (2022)
- Aircraft operations: 43,070
- Source: Federal Aviation Administration

St. Simons Island Airport at McKinnon Field (formerly Malcolm McKinnon Airport) (IATA: SSI, ICAO: KSSI, FAA LID: SSI) is six miles east of Brunswick, in Glynn County, Georgia on Saint Simons Island.

The airfield was named after Malcom B. McKinnon, chairman of the County Commission when construction started in 1935. The airport opened on May 28, 1938, seven months after his death. During World War II, it operated as Naval Air Station St. Simons Island and was eventually home to the Navy Radar Training School. Although NAS St. Simons Island remained an active air station following the war, its activities were eventually merged into nearby NAS Glynco and by 1947 it was finally closed as a naval air station and became a civil airport.

== Previous airline service ==
Delta Air Lines served Brunswick, Georgia (which it listed as Sea Island in its timetables) from 1945 through the 1960s. In 1946 a Delta Douglas DC-3 was scheduled Chicago - Cincinnati - Knoxville - Asheville - Greenville, SC - Spartanburg, SC - Augusta - Savannah - Brunswick - Jacksonville - Miami. In 1969 Delta Convair 440s flew nonstop to Atlanta and Jacksonville. Delta moved its Brunswick flights to Naval Air Station Glynco (now the Brunswick Golden Isles Airport) where it flew McDonnell Douglas DC-9-30s in the early 1970s.

Eastern Airlines served Brunswick from 1945 until 1964.

== Facilities ==
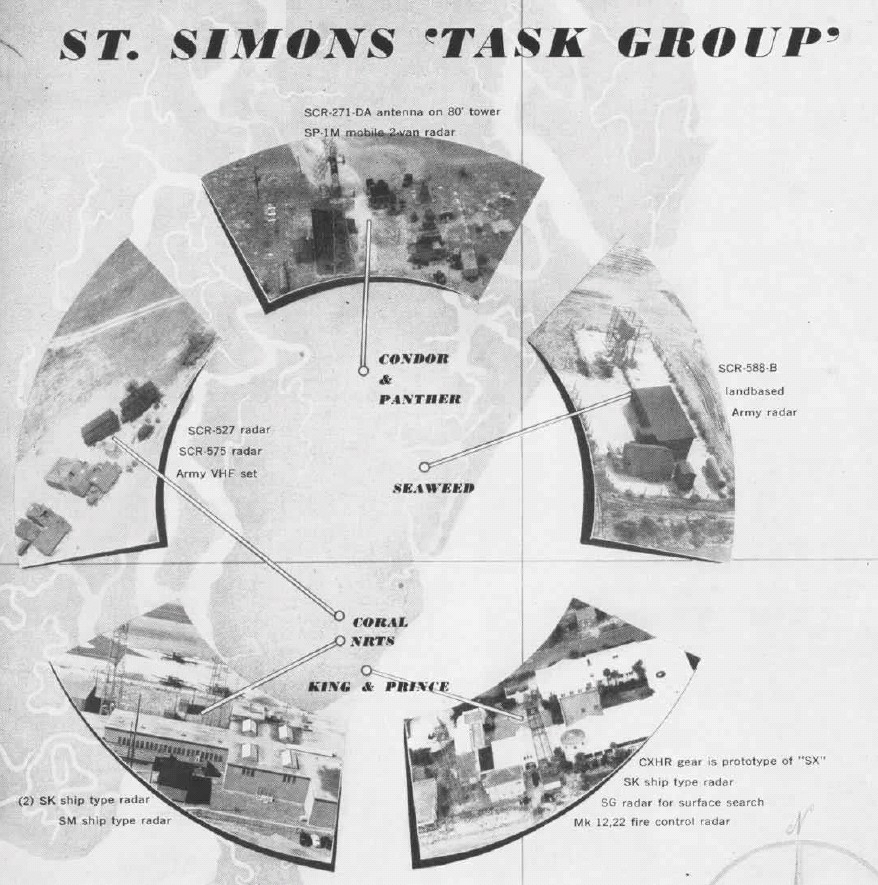
Installations of the Naval Reserve Training Station, mid-1940s

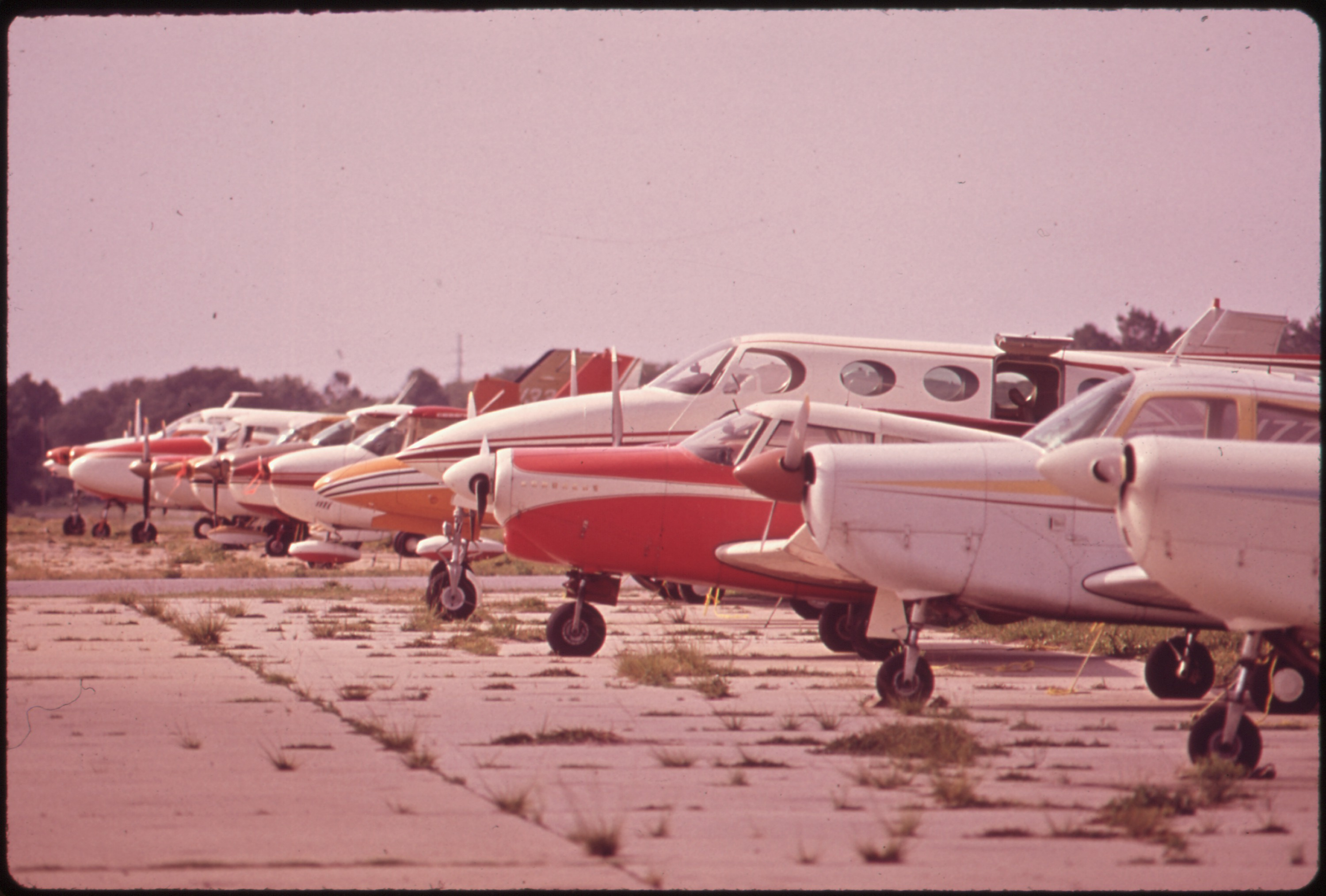
Aircraft at St. Simons in the 1970s

The airport covers 320 acres (130 ha) and has two asphalt runways: 4/22 is 5,584 x 100 ft (1,702 x 30 m) and 16/34 is 3,313 x 75 ft (1,010 x 23 m).

In the year ending December 31, 2022, the airport had 43,070 aircraft operations, average 118 per day: 99% general aviation and 2% military.

== See also ==
- List of airports in Georgia (U.S. state)
