= Naval Air Station Glynco =

Former military air base

- Brunswick, Georgia in the United States
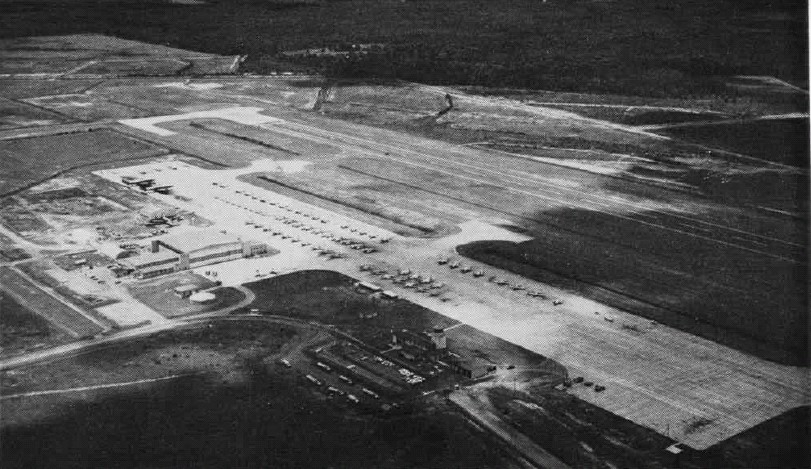
- Aerial view of NAS Glynco in the early 1960s

Site information
- Type: Naval Air Station
- Owner: Department of Defense
- Operator: US Navy
- Condition: Closed

Location
- Location in the United States
- Coordinates: 31°15′31.71″N 81°27′59.39″W

Site history
- Built: 1942–1943
- In use: 1942–1974
- Fate: Transferred to civilian use and became Brunswick Golden Isles Airport and Federal Law Enforcement Training Center

Airfield information
- Identifiers: ICAO: KNEA, FAA LID: NEA
- Elevation: 7.9 metres (26 ft) AMSL
Runways
Direction	Length and surface
7/25	2,439 metres (8,002 ft) Asphalt/concrete

Naval Air Station Glynco, Georgia, was an operational naval air station from 1942 to 1974 with an FAA airfield identifier of NEA and an ICAO identifier of KNEA.

Now known as Brunswick Golden Isles Airport (IATA: BQK, ICAO: KBQK), it was previously known as Glynco Jetport following NAS Glynco's closure. It is a public airport located 5 miles (8 km) north of the city of Brunswick, Georgia, US. The airport has a single runway and is mostly used for general aviation, but it is also served by one commercial airline.

== History ==
=== World War II ===
In August 1942, the United States Navy began building the air station on 2,400 acres (9.7 km^{2}) in the northern part of the county. Named NAS Glynco as an abbreviation of Glynn County, Georgia, it was initially constructed as an operational base for lighter-than-air airships, more commonly known as blimps.

In 14 months, workers at the new air station built two enormous wooden hangars, measuring 1,058 feet (322 m) long, 297 feet (91 m) wide and 182 feet (55 m) tall, to house an eight-ship fleet and to provide maintenance for blimps from other bases. Airship Patrol Squadron 15 (ZP-15), a subordinate unit of Fleet Airship Wing ONE at NAS Lakehurst / Maxfield Field, New Jersey was subsequently based at NAS Glynco and was the principal unit based at the air station during World War II. Capable of sustained flight and state-of-the-art electronic submarine detection, blimps flew thousands of hours on coastal and maritime patrol, as well as convoy escort duty, protecting vulnerable ships delivering essential war materials. This convoy escort program has often been cited as one of the most successful defense operations of the war.

A runway for fixed-wing aircraft was also constructed at NAS Glynco, as multiple units on the base continued to contribute to significant advances in the development of new communications and electronics equipment, as well as new search and rescue procedures.

=== Postwar/Cold War ===
NAS Glynco was originally slated for decommissioning in 1949 when tensions in Korea prompted the Navy to reconsider the value of the airship's anti-submarine warfare capabilities. As a result, the base was retained in an active status and a full complement of blimps returned to NAS Glynco, primarily under Airship Patrol Squadrons 2 (ZP-2) and 3 (ZP-3). In addition, airship pilot training for previously designated heavier-than-air Naval Aviators from the fixed-wing and rotary-wing communities was conducted by the Airship Training Unit (ZTG) at NAS Glynco, which had moved from NAS Lakehurst in 1954. Other training functions followed. However, the Navy began to slowly dismantle the airship program and disestablished ZP-2, ZP-3 and ZTG in 1959. The mammoth blimp hangars finally succumbed to the effects of time and climate and the unique landmarks were demolished in 1971.

=== Cold War/Vietnam War ===
As lighter-than-air operations declined, fixed-wing aircraft operations increased as NAS Glynco's runway was increased in length to slightly over 8,000 feet (2,400 m). In the 1960s, as the Navy expanded the role of Naval Aviation Observers, later redesignated as Naval Flight Officers (NFO), for the next generation of carrier-based multi-crew aircraft, NAS Glynco assumed added responsibility for advanced NFO training. The former Naval Air Technical Training Center Glynco was disestablished and Training Air Wing EIGHT (TRAWING 8), reporting to the Chief of Naval Air Training (CNATRA) at Naval Air Station Corpus Christi, Texas was established at NAS Glynco in NATTC's place. Training Squadron 86 (VT-86) was subsequently established as a subordinate command to TRAWING 8 in order to provide advanced training for U.S. Navy and U.S. Marine Corps NFOs slated for eventual assignment as Radar Intercept Officers (RIO) in the F-4 Phantom II and F-14 Tomcat, Bombardier Navigators (B/N) in the A-3 Skywarrior, A-5 Vigilante and A-6 Intruder, Reconnaissance Attack Navigators (RAN) in the RA-5C Vigilante, Reconnaissance Systems Officers (RSO) in the RF-4B Phantom II, Electronic Warfare Officers in the EA-3B Skywarrior, Electronic Countermeasures Officers in the EA-6A Intruder and EA-6B Prowler, Combat Information Center Officers (CICO) in the E-2 Hawkeye, and as Tactical Coordinators (TACCO) in the S-3 Viking. While at NAS Glynco, VT-86 operated a combination of 24 T-39 Sabreliner, 20 A-4C Skyhawk, 2 EC-121K Warning Star, and 12 TS-2A Tracker aircraft.

During this time, the Navy also examined adding three additional runways and enlarging NAS Glynco into a Master Jet Base. Although this expansion was never executed, it was later employed at other installations, such as Naval Air Station Oceana, Virginia; Naval Air Station Miramar, California; Naval Air Station Lemoore, California and the former Naval Air Station Cecil Field, Florida.

In March 1962, NAS Glynco's mission expanded when the Navy's enlisted air traffic control schools transferred from Naval Air Technical Training Unit (NATTU) Olathe at Naval Air Station Olathe near Gardner, Kansas The Air Traffic Control Schools Division of Naval Air Technical Training Center (NATTC) Glynco was subsequently established, providing "A" School, "B" School and "O" School instruction for U.S. Navy enlisted personnel in the Air Controller (AC) rating and similar training for enlisted U.S. Marines in the air traffic control Military Occupational Specialty (MOS).

=== Cold War/Post-Vietnam War and Base Closure ===
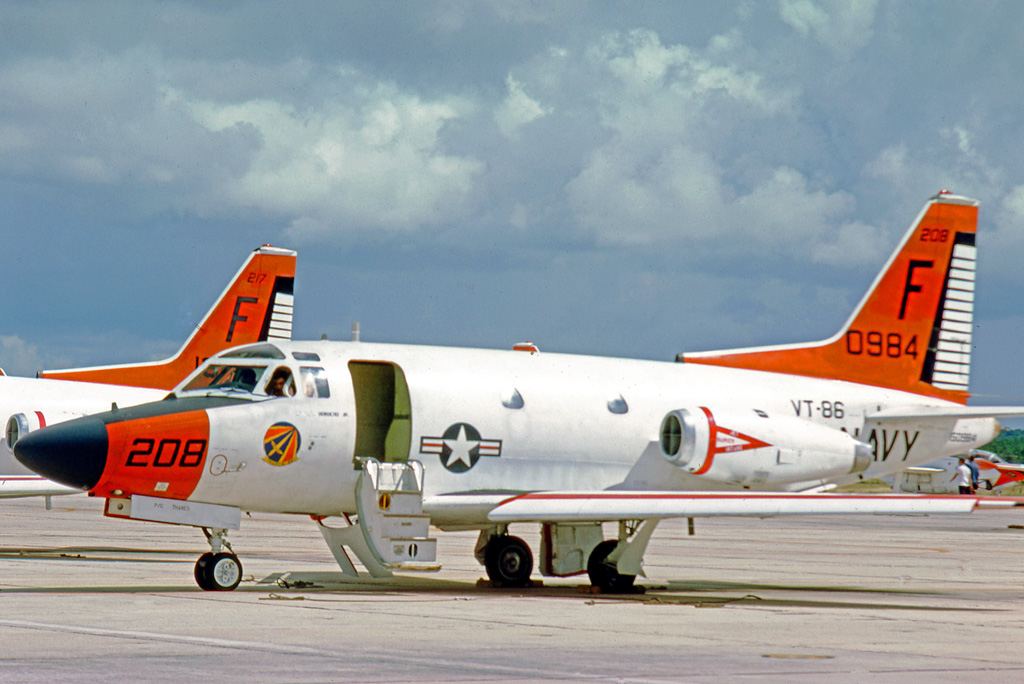
T-39D Sabreliner trainer, BuNo 150984, of VT-86 at NAS Pensacola in 1975, shortly after arriving from NAS Glynco

NAS Glynco was identified for closure by the end of 1974, part of a wide-ranging series of post-Vietnam budget reduction base closures that shuttered such installations as Naval Air Station Albany, Georgia (formerly Turner AFB), Naval Air Station Quonset Point, Rhode Island, McCoy AFB, Florida and Kincheloe Air Force Base, Michigan. As part of the base closure process, TRAWING 8 was disestablished and VT-86 was transferred to Training Air Wing SIX (TRAWING 6) at Naval Air Station Pensacola, Florida where it continues to train USN and USMC NFOs for the F/A-18F Super Hornet, F/A-18D Hornet, and EA-18G Growler. Until recently, USAF Navigators/Combat Systems Officers destined for weapon systems officer (WSO) duties in the F-15E Strike Eagle and B-1B Lancer were also trained by VT-86; however, the Air Force's 479th Flying Training Group (also located at NAS Pensacola) now performs these duties. The Air Traffic Control Operations and Maintenance Schools were initially relocated to NATTC Millington at the former NAS Memphis and current Naval Support Activity Mid-South, Tennessee and are now located with NATTC Pensacola at NAS Pensacola, Florida.

At the time of its closure, NAS Glynco had been a strong influence in Glynn County for over 31 years, both economically and as an element of local identity, and its closure took the local community by surprise. The Glynn County community took control of its destiny when a group of 19 community leaders formed the Glynco Steering Committee to attract new civilian users to the airfield. Their efforts paid off in 1975 when the Federal Law Enforcement Training Center (FLETC) selected NAS Glynco's former lighter-than-air/blimp site for a consolidated training academy for federal law enforcement personnel. The community retained the airfield, which was designated the official county municipal airport in 1975. Both developments proved to be invaluable to the future of Brunswick and the Golden Isles. Contributions to the local economy and population of Glynn County by the FLETC have had considerable impact and the 8,000-foot (2,400 m) jet runway has been an important community asset.

The Glynn County Airport Commission was established in 1980 to manage and develop new opportunities for both the Brunswick and St. Simons Island airports. Since then, the Airport Commission has continued to improve service and facilities through a series of upgrades and repairs. To accurately reflect the destination for travelers and pilots, the Glynco Jetport was renamed Brunswick Golden Isles Airport in 2003. The new passenger terminal, completed in 2005 on the site of the former Navy air traffic control tower and base operations building, reflects the local tradition of hospitality for passengers of scheduled carrier service. Subsequent improvements have encouraged the expansion of general aviation, charter airline and scheduled airline traffic as well. The previous Navy control tower has not been replaced by the FAA and the airport currently has no active control tower.

== Airlines ==
- Delta Air Lines
- Delta Connection

In 1973, Delta Air Lines was serving Brunswick, Georgia via NAS Glynco with McDonnell Douglas DC-9-30 jetliners on direct mainline flights to Atlanta and Orlando as well as nonstop mainline flights to Augusta, Jacksonville and Macon (the Augusta and Macon flights continued on to Atlanta). Delta had previously served Brunswick from the mid 1940s through the 1960s via the McKinnon St. Simons Island Airport with prop aircraft before introducing jet service via NAS Glynco. Current Delta service at the airport is flown by SkyWest Airlines operating as the Delta Connection with nonstop flights to Atlanta operated with Canadair CRJ200 regional jet aircraft.

== See also ==
- Aircraft Warning Service
- Navy Air Stations Blimps bases
- US Navy airships during World War II

Related lists

- List of airships of the United States Navy
