= Carl M. Kuttler Jr. =

American academic (born 1940)

Dr. Carl M. Kuttler Jr.

5th President of St. Petersburg College
- In office 1978–2009
- Preceded by: Michael M. Bennett
- Succeeded by: William D. Law

Personal details
- Born: January 31, 1940 Daytona Beach, Florida
- Died: April 2, 2025 (aged 85) Safety Harbor, Florida
- Spouse(s): Evelyn Flathmann (m. 1963; div. 2010); Violetta Sweet (m. 2011)
- Children: Cindy Kuttler Mercer; Carl M. Kuttler III; Erika Kuttler Shannon
- Education: St. Petersburg College; Florida State University; Stetson University College of Law
- Profession: Community college president, lawyer

Carl Martin Kuttler Jr. (31 January 1940 in Daytona Beach, Florida – 2 April 2025) was the fifth president of St. Petersburg College in St. Petersburg, Florida, which he led from 1978 to 2009.

== Early life and education ==
Kuttler was born in Daytona Beach, Florida, to Carl Martin Kuttler and Rema Winona Ellis. His family moved to St. Petersburg, Florida when he was four years old. At St. Petersburg High School, he was told by a guidance counselor that he was "not college material", so after graduation he planned to work in his uncle's meat supply business. But his father convinced him to enroll in college. He earned his A.A. in management from St. Petersburg Junior College in 1960, his B.S. in business administration from Florida State University in 1962, and his Juris Doctor degree from Stetson University College of Law in 1965.

== Career ==
He began his career at St. Petersburg Junior College in 1966 as assistant to the vice president for administration. From 1967 to 1978 he served as dean of administrative affairs. Upon the retirement of college president Michael M. Bennett in 1978, Kuttler assumed the presidency, becoming one of Florida's youngest-ever community college presidents. During his tenure, he oversaw the transition of the college to a four-year institution (now called St. Petersburg College) offering over 20 bachelor's degrees, the expansion of the campus from two campuses to 10 learning locations, and an increase in enrollment from 13,300 to 36,133 students.

Kuttler was known as an "entrepreneurial" college president for his efforts to form partnerships between St. Petersburg College and governments, businesses, cultural institutions, and other colleges and universities. These include the development of the $32 million EpiCenter corporate training center in Largo; joint-use libraries for St. Petersburg College and Seminole State; the Leepa-Rattner Museum of Art on the St. Petersburg College campus in Tarpon Springs; and the St. Petersburg College Downtown Center serving The Florida Orchestra, American Stage, and the Palladium Theater.

In 1988, Kuttler leveraged a gift of land and facilities worth $11.2 million from the Allstate Insurance Company with over $30 million in state and federal grants to create a home for the college's Open Campus program, Southeastern Public Safety Institute for law-enforcement programs, and central computer. He also raised money in the public arena. In his first year as president, he put a referendum on the Pinellas County ballot seeking a temporary hike in property taxes to raise $500,000 for college improvements, which passed voter approval. The college also petitioned for and received $6.5 million from the Florida state legislature to purchase and remodel three retail buildings for college use.

Kuttler was known for calling and sending a card to each of the college's 1,000 full-time employees on their birthdays. He also sent birthday gifts to Florida legislators – "ties for the men and scarves, pins, or Kmart crystal for the women" – and sent a potted plant to every new community college and university president in Florida. He instituted an employee recognition program and dispatched a congratulatory letter to every St. Petersburg College student who placed in the top 3% of academic achievement.

=== International relationships ===
Kuttler formed international relationships and joint educational ventures with Russia, China, Ecuador, Estonia, Guatemala, Greece, Italy, and other countries. Music, dance, and ballet performances have been part of the U.S.-Russian cultural exchange. St. Petersburg College's police training academy has trained 6,000 of Puerto Rico's 18,000 police officers.

Beginning in 1989, Kuttler established a 20-year relationship with the Russian government, supporting educational, political and business initiatives. In 1989 Kuttler hosted his first Russian delegation at St. Petersburg College and embarked on a 10-day exchange program in which Vladimir Putin, then an associate vice president at Saint Petersburg State University in St. Petersburg, Russia, was his daily host. Kuttler made another two visits to Russia over the years, giving interviews on Russian national television and receiving invitations and several awards from Russian universities and institutions.

For two weeks in the fall of 1990, Kuttler served as honorary rector of Leningrad State University (formerly Saint Petersburg State University) as part of an exchange that brought that university's rector, Stanislav P. Merkuriev to St. Petersburg College, where Merkuriev was named honorary president. In May and June 1993, Kuttler was sent to Russia by the United States Information Agency to be the technical advisor for the creation of a national community college system. After that he was named "Father of the Russian Community College System".

Kuttler welcomed a total of 300 Russian leaders to the United States during his presidency, including heads of automobile manufacturing companies and airlines, journalists, state Duma officials, and judges. He met with President Putin and Russian ambassador Yuri Ushakov during Putin's visit to Washington, D.C. in October 2001; one result of that visit was Kuttler's establishment of a scholarship fund named after Putin and Ushakov to benefit Russian students in the United States. In April 2003 Kuttler was invited by Putin to attend an international law panel in St. Petersburg, Russia together with 25 world leaders, including French President Jacques Chirac and German Chancellor Gerhard Schroeder. In June 2004, he was named Honorary Consul of the Russian Federation to the State of Florida upon the recommendation of Russia's Prime Minister and the Russian ambassador to the U.S.; the appointment was approved by the United States State Department.

== Other activities ==
In 1974, Kuttler ran for the office of state education commissioner. He was defeated by Ralph Turlington by a 2–1 margin.

In the 1980s, in partnership with the American Association of Community and Junior Colleges, Kuttler developed a series of annual Presidential Leadership Seminars on current issues, first with former President Jimmy Carter at the Carter Center in Atlanta and then with former President Gerald Ford at the Gerald R. Ford Presidential Museum in Grand Rapids, Michigan.

In 1988 Kuttler was nominated by President Ronald Reagan to be a member of the National Advisory Council on Educational Research and Improvement, and was re-nominated as vice-chair of that council by President George H. W. Bush in 1992.

== Honors and awards ==
Kuttler has been honored by many prominent organizations as an outstanding community college president, including the Florida Association of Community Colleges, Phi Theta Kappa, the National Institute for Staff and Organizational Development, the National Association of Community College Trustees in America, and the School of Education at the University of Texas at Austin.

Other awards include the American Bar Association’s Liberty Bell Award; the 1997 Werner O. Kubsch Award for Achievement in International Education; the 2006 Pioneer Award of the Community College Baccalaureate Association; the 2009 James L. Wattenbarger Award of the Florida Association of Community Colleges; and the 2009 Tampa Bay Businesses for Culture and Arts Award. Kuttler is listed in a number of Who's Who directories. In 1996 Kuttler was named one of nine worldwide judges for the Templeton Prize in Religion. The St. Petersburg City Council proclaimed 31 January 2005, his 65th birthday, as Dr. Carl M. Kuttler, Jr. Day.

== Retirement ==
Kuttler surprised his staff and trustees at the end of a routine board of trustees meeting in July 2009 by announcing his retirement. He was succeeded by Dr. William D. Law, formerly president of Tallahassee Community College.

== Personal ==
Kuttler married Evelyn Elise Flathmann, also an alumna of Stetson University College of Law, on June 29, 1963. The couple had three children.

In September 2010, Kuttler filed for divorce, citing "unhappy differences" that had arisen between himself and his wife of 47 years, and providing the judge with a statement of division of property which he and his wife had worked out.

In November 2011, Kuttler married St. Petersburg College staff member, Violetta Sweet.

Kutler died on 2 April 2025.

== Selected bibliography ==
=== Books ===
- Roueche, John; Parnell, Dale; Kuttler, Carl M. (1994). 1001 Exemplary Practices in America's Two-Year Colleges. McGraw-Hill. ISBN 0-07-048597-6.

=== Articles, book chapters ===
- "Why Do We Need Ethics Courses?" in Higher Education and National Affairs, Volume 36 (1987). American Council on Education, p. 27ff.
- "Vision and Vitality" in Conceptualizing 2000: Proactive Planning (1991). American Association of Community and Junior Colleges, chapter 5. ISBN 0-87117-226-7.
- "Partnerships: The Parlaying Principles" in The Company We Keep: Collaboration in the Community College, John E. Roueche, et al., ed. (1995). American Association of Community Colleges, chapter 7. ISBN 0-87117-282-8.
- "St. Petersburg College: An e-spirited institution" in The Entrepreneurial Community College, John E. Roueche and Barbara R. Jones, ed. (2005). American Association of Community Colleges, pp. 37–50. ISBN 0-87117-367-0.
- "Putin and Me". St. Petersburg Times. 29 April 2007. Archived from the original on March 4, 2016.
