= E. Ann McGee =

President of Seminole State College of Florida
- Incumbent
- Assumed office 1996
- Preceded by: Earl S. Weldon

Personal details
- Education: Florida State University; Nova Southeastern University

E. Ann McGee is an American academic, and the former President of Seminole State College of Florida. McGee graduated with her bachelor's degree in speech from Florida State University. She received her master's degree from Florida State University in communications. In addition she received her doctorate from Nova Southeastern University. In 1996, she became Seminole State's second president.

== Awards ==
- Marie Y. Martin "Top CEO" by the Association of Community College Trustees, 2006
- Phi Theta Kappa's Shirley B. Gordon Award of Distinction, 2005
- Seminole County Chamber of Commerce Lifetime Achievement Award, 2004
- One of the Top 100 Most Influential People in Central Florida by The Orlando Business Journal
- "Most Outstanding Graduate" by St. Petersburg College, 2009
