= Federal Law Enforcement Training Centers =

U.S. government agency

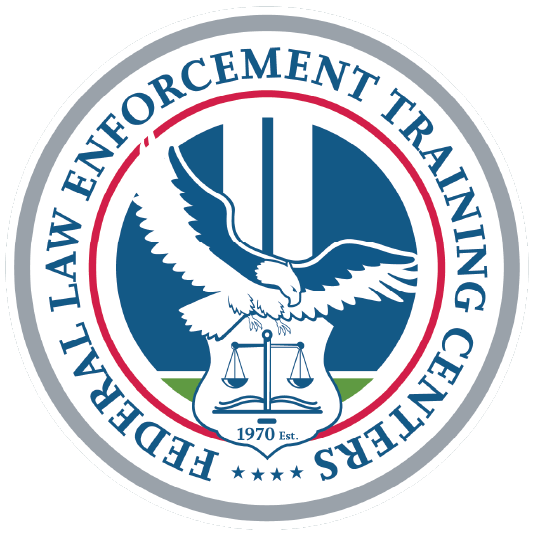
- Seal

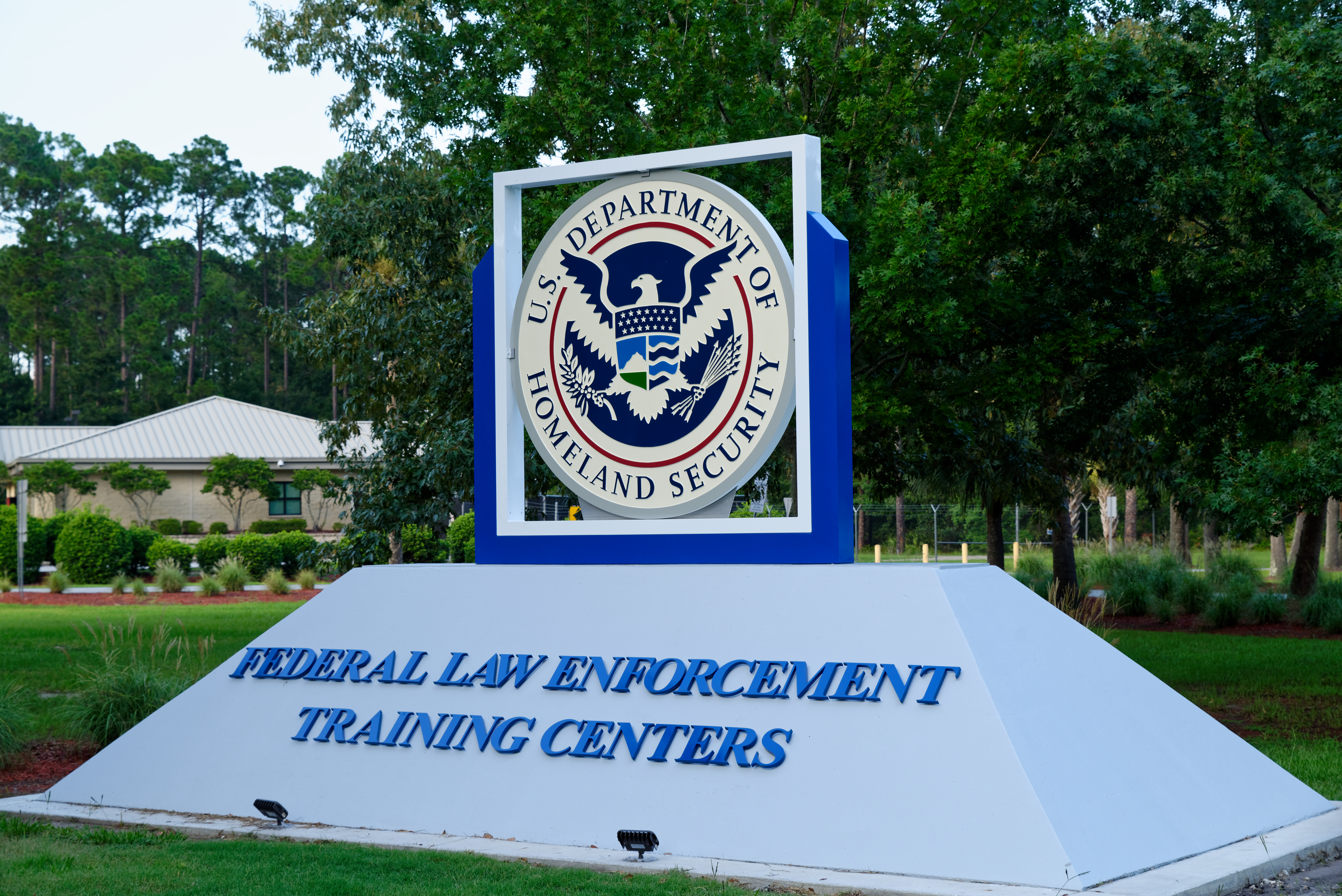
- Entrance to FLETC Headquarters

Agency overview
- Formed: July 1, 1970
- Jurisdiction: Federal government of the United States
- Headquarters: Glynco, Georgia; 31°14′02″N 81°28′08″W
- Employees: 1,068
- Annual budget: US$242 million (2017)
- Agency executives: Benjamine Huffman, Director; Paul E. Baker, Deputy Director
- Parent department: U.S. Department of Homeland Security
- Website: fletc.gov

The Federal Law Enforcement Training Centers (FLETC; pronounced /ˈflɛtsi/) are law enforcement training schools operated by the United States Department of Homeland Security, serving 105 federal law enforcement agencies within the United States federal government. Through the Rural Policing Institute (RPI) and the Office of State and Local Training, it also provides tuition-free and low-cost training to state, local, campus, and tribal law enforcement agencies.

== History ==
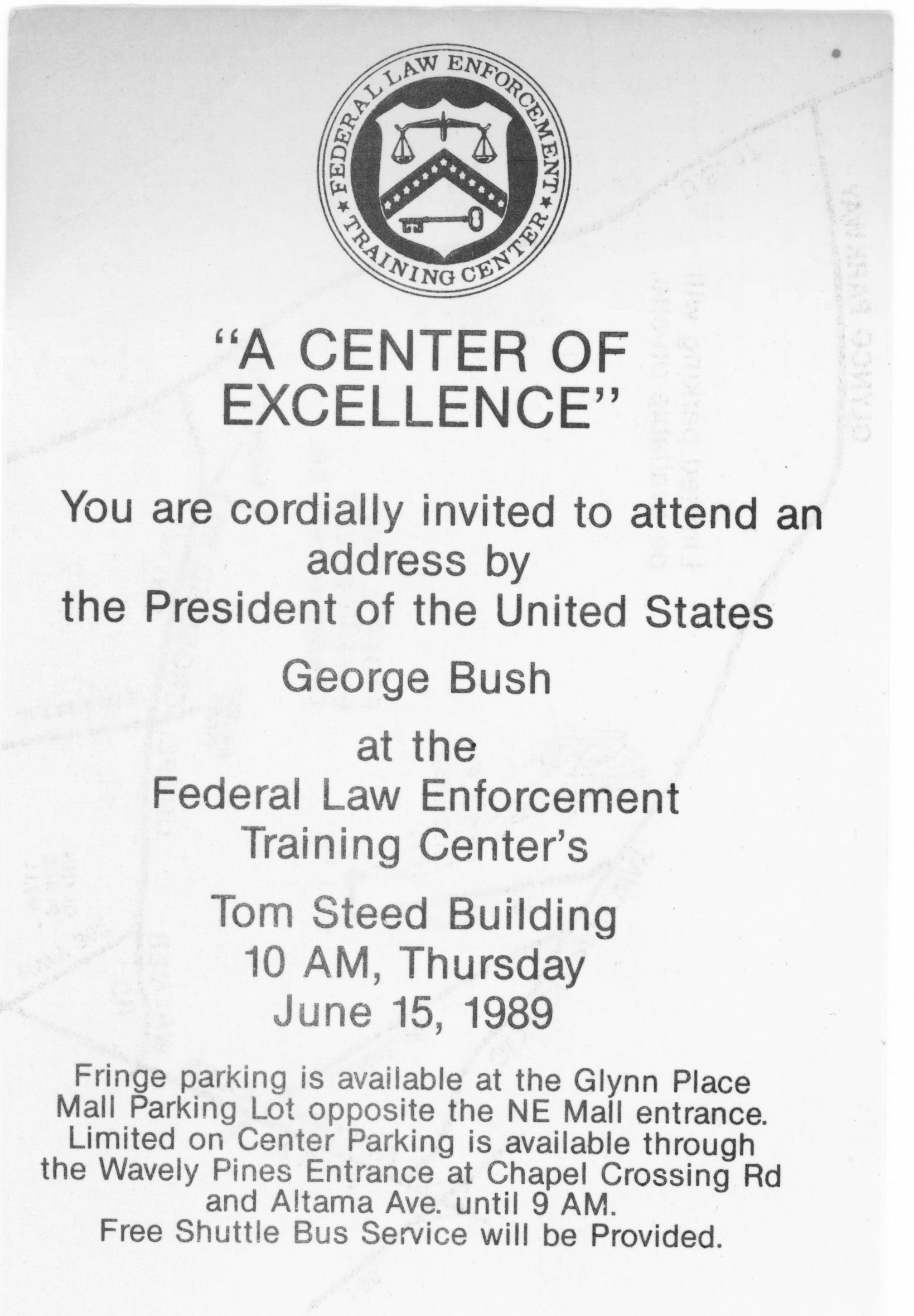
Presidential address, June 1989

Studies conducted in the late 1960s revealed an urgent need for training by professional instructors using modern training facilities and standardized course content. The Congress authorized funds for planning and constructing the Consolidated Federal Law Enforcement Training Center (CFLETC). In 1970, the CFLETC was established as a bureau of the United States Department of the Treasury (Treasury Order #217) and began training operations in temporary facilities in Washington, D.C.

The permanent location of the center was originally planned for the Washington, D.C., area. However, a three-year construction delay resulted in Congress requesting that surplus federal installations be surveyed to determine if one could serve as the permanent site. In May 1975, after a review of existing facilities, the former Naval Air Station Glynco was selected. In the summer of 1975, the newly renamed Federal Law Enforcement Training Center (FLETC) relocated from Washington, D.C., and began training in September of that year at Glynco, Georgia. Glynco is the headquarters site and main campus for the FLETC and houses the senior leadership of the organization.

On March 1, 2003, FLETC was transferred from the United States Department of the Treasury to the newly established United States Department of Homeland Security (DHS), along with some 22 other federal agencies and entities.

== Headquarters ==
The FLETC headquarters are at the former Naval Air Station Glynco in the Glynco area of unincorporated Glynn County, Georgia, near the port city of Brunswick, Georgia, and about halfway between Savannah, Georgia, and Jacksonville, Florida. The FLETC Orlando team located at Naval Air Warfare Center Training Systems Division in Orlando, Florida, trains with branches of the United States Armed Forces evaluating new and existing training technologies for their ability to meet law enforcement training needs. The Los Angeles Regional Maritime Law Enforcement Training Center in Los Angeles, California, has worked a partnership with FLETC along with the Los Angeles County Sheriff's Department along with state and local agencies to develop comprehensive maritime training. FLETC has oversight and program management responsibilities for the International Law Enforcement Academies (ILEA) in Gaborone, Botswana; San Salvador, El Salvador; and Lima, Peru. It also supports training at ILEAs in Budapest, Hungary, and Bangkok, Thailand.

=== Locations ===
- Artesia, New Mexico
- Charleston, South Carolina
- Cheltenham, Maryland
- Brunswick, Georgia

== Parent department ==
The FLETC's parent department, the DHS, supervises its administrative and financial activities. As an interagency training organization, FLETC has professionals from diverse backgrounds to serve on its faculty and staff. Approximately one-third of the instructor staff are permanent FLETC employees. The remainder are federal officers and investigators on short-term assignment from their parent organizations. Agencies take part in curriculum review and development conferences and help develop policies and directives.

== Affiliations ==
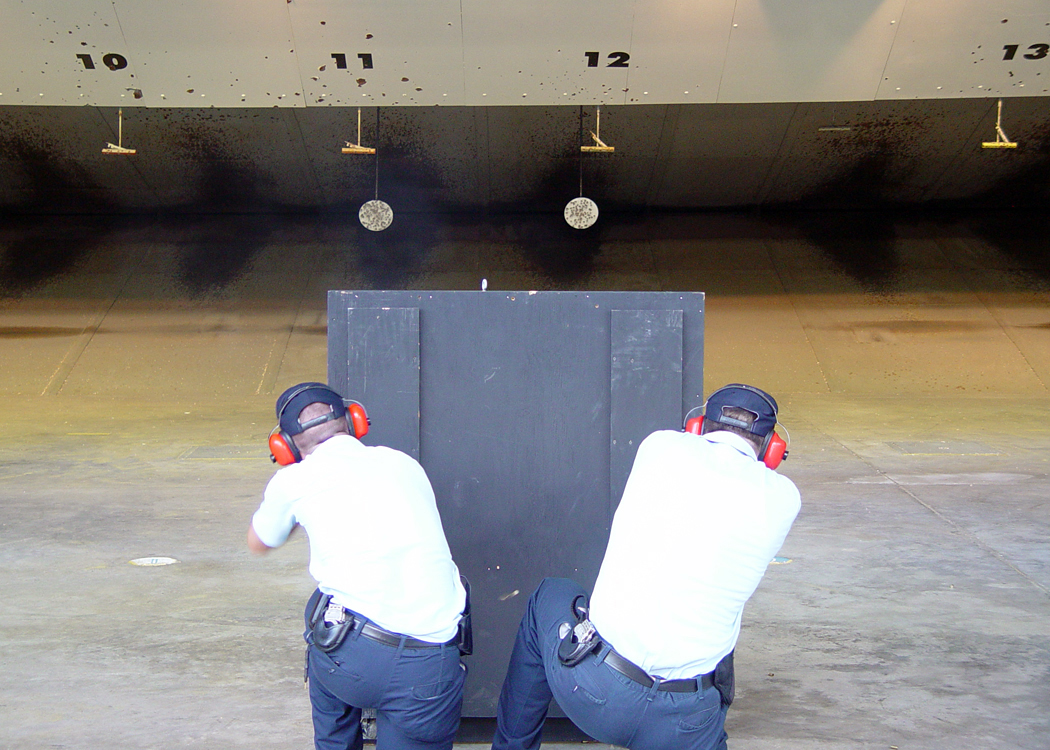
CGIS training at Glynco, Georgia

Partner organizations have input regarding training issues and functional aspects of the Center. The current partner organizations are:

- Administrative Office of the United States Courts
  - U.S. Probation and Pretrial Services System
- Amtrak (National Railroad Passenger Corporation)
  - Office of Inspector General
  - Police Department
- Central Intelligence Agency
  - The Directorate of Digital Innovation
  - The Directorate of Analysis
  - The Directorate of Operations
  - The Directorate of Support
  - The Directorate of Science and Technology
- Executive Office
- Department of Agriculture
  - Animal Plant Health Inspection Services
  - Food Safety Inspection Service
  - Office of the Inspector General
  - United States Forest Service
- Department of Commerce
  - Bureau of Industry and Security, Office of Export Enforcement
  - National Institute of Standards and Technology
  - National Oceanic and Atmospheric Administration
    - National Marine Fisheries Service
- Department of Defense
  - Department of the Air Force
    - United States Air Force Office of Special Investigations
  - Department of the Army
    - Army Criminal Investigation Division
    - Army Counterintelligence Command
  - Department of the Navy
    - Commander, Navy Installations Command
    - Naval Criminal Investigative Service
  - Defense Intelligence Agency
  - Defense Logistics Agency
  - National Geospatial-Intelligence Agency
  - National Security Agency
  - Office of Inspector General
    - Defense Criminal Investigative Service
  - Pentagon Force Protection Agency
- Department of Education
  - Office of the Inspector General
- Department of Energy
  - National Nuclear Security Administration
    - Office of Secure Transportation
    - Protective Forces
  - Office of Inspector General
- Department of Health and Human Services
  - Center for Disease Control and Prevention – Office of Safety, Security and Asset Management
  - Food and Drug Administration - Office of Criminal Investigations
  - National Institute of Health
  - Office of the Inspector General
- Department of Homeland Security
  - Customs and Border Protection
    - United States Border Patrol
  - Immigration & Customs Enforcement
  - Enforcement and Removal Operations
  - Federal Emergency Management Agency - Office of Security
  - United States Federal Protective Service
  - Homeland Security Investigations
  - Intelligence Analysis Operations
  - Office of Inspector General
  - Office of Professional Responsibility
  - Transportation Security Administration
    - Federal Air Marshal Service
  - United States Secret Service
  - United States Citizenship and Immigration Services
  - United States Coast Guard
    - Coast Guard Investigative Service
    - Marine Law Enforcement Academy
- Department of Housing and Urban Development
  - Office of the Inspector General
  - Protective Services Division
- Department of Interior
  - Bureau of Indian Affairs
  - Bureau of Land Management
  - Bureau of Reclamation
  - Office of Inspector General
  - Office of Law Enforcement and Security
  - Office of Surface Mining Reclamation and Enforcement
  - National Park Service
    - United States Park Police
    - United States Park Rangers
  - United States Fish and Wildlife Service
    - Office of Law Enforcement
    - Refuge Law Enforcement
- Department of Justice
  - Bureau of Alcohol, Tobacco, Firearms and Explosives
  - Federal Bureau of Prisons
  - Office of the Inspector General
  - United States Marshals Service
- Department of Labor
  - Office of Inspector General
  - Office of Labor-Management Standards
- Department of State
  - Diplomatic Security Service
  - Office of Inspector General
  - United States Agency for International Development - Office of Inspector General
- Department of Transportation
  - Office of Inspector General
  - Federal Aviation Administration
- Department of the Treasury
  - Bureau of Engraving and Printing
  - Financial Crimes Enforcement Network
  - Internal Revenue Service, Criminal Investigation
  - Office of Terrorism and Financial Intelligence - Office of Foreign Assets Control
  - Office of the Inspector General
  - Treasury Inspector General for Tax Administration
  - United States Mint
    - United States Mint Police
- Department of Veterans Affairs
  - Law Enforcement Training Center
  - Office of the Inspector General
- Environmental Protection Agency
  - Criminal Investigation Division
  - Office of the Inspector General
- Federal Deposit Insurance Corporation - Office of the Inspector General
- Federal Reserve System
- General Services Administration - Office of the Inspector General
- Government Publishing Office
  - Office of the Inspector General
  - Security Services
- National Aeronautics and Space Administration - Office of the Inspector General
- Nuclear Regulatory Commission
  - Office of the Inspector General
- Office of Personnel Management
  - Office of the Inspector General
- Railroad Retirement Board - Office of the Inspector General
- Small Business Administration
  - Office of the Inspector General
- Smithsonian Institution
  - National Zoological Park Police
  - Office of Protective Services
- Social Security Administration
  - Office of the Inspector General
- Tennessee Valley Authority
  - Office of the Inspector General
  - Police Department
- United States Capitol Police
- United States Postal Service
  - Office of the Inspector General
- United States Supreme Court Police

== See also ==
- FBI Academy
