= St. Petersburg College =

Public college in St. Petersburg, Florida, US

- Former name: St. Petersburg Junior College (1927–2001)
- Motto: Lux et veritas (Latin)
- Motto in English: "Light and truth"
- Type: Public college
- Established: September 12, 1927; 99 years ago
- Founder: Captain George M. Lynch
- Parent institution: Florida College System
- Accreditation: SACS
- Endowment: $32.1 million (2024)
- Budget: $182.1 million (2025)
- President: Tonjua Williams
- Faculty: 270 (full-time); 875 (part-time)
- Total staff: 2,339 Employees
- Undergraduates: 23,501 (fall 2022); 900 (part-time)
- Location: Pinellas County, Florida, United States
- Campus: Large city
- Colors: Blue, gold, and white
- Nickname: Titans
- Sporting affiliations: NJCAA Region 8 – Suncoast Conference
- Mascot: Titus the Titan
- Website: www.spcollege.edu

St. Petersburg College (SPC) is a public college in Pinellas County, Florida, United States. Part of the Florida College System, SPC offers several associate and baccalaureate degrees as well as certificate and short-term learning programs. It is accredited by the Southern Association of Colleges and Schools.

== History ==
SPC was established on September 12, 1927, as St. Petersburg Junior College (SPJC) by Captain George M. Lynch, the city superintendent of schools for St. Petersburg, Florida. It was founded as a private, non-profit institution to provide affordable, local access to higher education during the economic downturn preceding the Great Depression. The college was also the state of Florida's first two-year institution of higher learning.

SPJC began with 102 students and 14 faculty members in a wing of St. Petersburg High School. After one semester, it moved to a former high school near Mirror Lake in downtown St. Petersburg. In 1929, 48 students became SPJC’s first graduating class. More than half received state teaching certificates. At the time, the need for certified teachers in Pinellas County was great and growing, and a two-year college diploma was all that was needed for certification.

In 1941, SPJC erected its first permanent campus at 5th Avenue North and 66th Street in St. Petersburg, moving from the downtown area of the city. The college would begin offering classes at the new campus in January of 1942. The location would later be known as the St. Petersburg/Gibbs Campus.

SPJC converted from private to public school status in 1948, becoming the second such institution in the state to make the change.

On September 3, 1957, Gibbs Junior College (GJC), opened as one of Florida’s 12 original Black colleges and was named after Jonathan Gibbs, Florida’s first Black cabinet member. GJC merged with SPC in 1965 and became the Gibbs Campus. It would later be renamed to the Skyway Campus before being phased out of operation in June 1967.

In 1993, the college renamed its first permanent campus to the St. Petersburg/Gibbs Campus to honor the contributions and impact that the former Gibbs Junior College made in furthering education in Florida.

SPJC reached a defining milestone in 2001 when the Florida Legislature passed a bill that allowed it to become the first two-year college in the state to offer bachelor’s degrees. The college simultaneously updated its name, dropping the “Junior” to be known as St. Petersburg College (SPC), and also adopted a Titan for the new school mascot.

=== SPC presidents ===
1. George M. Lynch, 1927–1935 (his death)
2. Robert B. Reed, 1935–1944 (his death)
3. Roland A. Wakefield, 1944–1950 (his retirement)
4. Michael M. Bennett, 1950–1978 (his retirement)
5. Carl Kuttler, Jr., 1978–2009 (his retirement)
6. William D. Law, Jr., 2010–2017 (his retirement)
7. Tonjua Williams, 2017–present

== Campuses and learning sites ==
SPC operates several campuses and learning sites across Pinellas County, including four in St. Petersburg and others in Seminole, Pinellas Park, Clearwater, and Tarpon Springs. The college does not offer on-campus housing due to the decentralized nature of its campuses.

Many of SPC's learning sites specialize in specific fields; for example, the Caruth Health Education Center in Pinellas Park focuses on health care programs, while the Seminole Campus is known for its technology programs.

The Seminole campus also houses the University Partnership Center, which offers select degree programs through partnerships with 16 accredited institutions. These include universities such as Florida State University, the University of Florida, and the University of Central Florida. SPC offers 60 bachelor's degrees and 39 graduate degrees through these partnerships.

Reconstruction of the St. Petersburg/Gibbs and Clearwater campuses included LEED Gold Certified buildings, marking the first such certification for higher education facilities in Pinellas County.

=== Current SPC campuses and learning sites ===
The below locations are listed chronologically based on the year they opened for classes or to the public:

- St. Petersburg/Gibbs Campus (opened in 1942)
- Clearwater Campus (opened in 1965)
- Tarpon Springs Campus (opened in 1975)
- Caruth Health Education Center (opened in 1981)
- Allstate Center (opened in 1991)
- Seminole Campus (opened in 1998)
- Downtown Center (opened in 1998)
- EpiCenter (joint-use space, partially opened in 2004)
- Douglas L. Jamerson, Jr. Midtown Center (opened in 2015)
- Bay Pines STEM Center (opened in 2017)

=== Collegiate high schools ===
High schools associated with the college include:

- St. Petersburg Collegiate High School - Located in the Student Services (SS) building on the St.Petersburg/Gibbs Campus.
- St. Petersburg Collegiate High School Northern Pinellas - Located in the Bilirakis Building (BB) on the Tarpon Springs Campus.
- St. Petersburg Collegiate STEM High School - Located on the second floor on the Downtown Center.

== Libraries ==
SPC has eight campus libraries, including joint-use libraries that serve both the college and the public. These libraries provide access to print and electronic resources, including books, academic journals, streaming media, and research databases. Students can also access digital reference services through AskALibrarian.

=== SPC Libraries ===
- Allstate Center Library
- Clearwater East Community Library at St. Petersburg College Clearwater Campus
- SPC Downtown Library
- SPC Midtown Library
- West St. Petersburg Community Library at St. Petersburg/Gibbs Campus
- Health Education Center Library
- Seminole Community Library at St. Petersburg College Seminole Campus
- Tarpon Springs Campus Library

== Athletics ==
The SPC athletic teams, known as the Titans, compete in the National Junior College Athletic Association and are members of the Suncoast Conference. The college offers men's teams in basketball and baseball, and women's teams in basketball, volleyball, tennis, and softball. The Titans softball team participated in the first Women's College World Series in 1969.

== Notable alumni ==
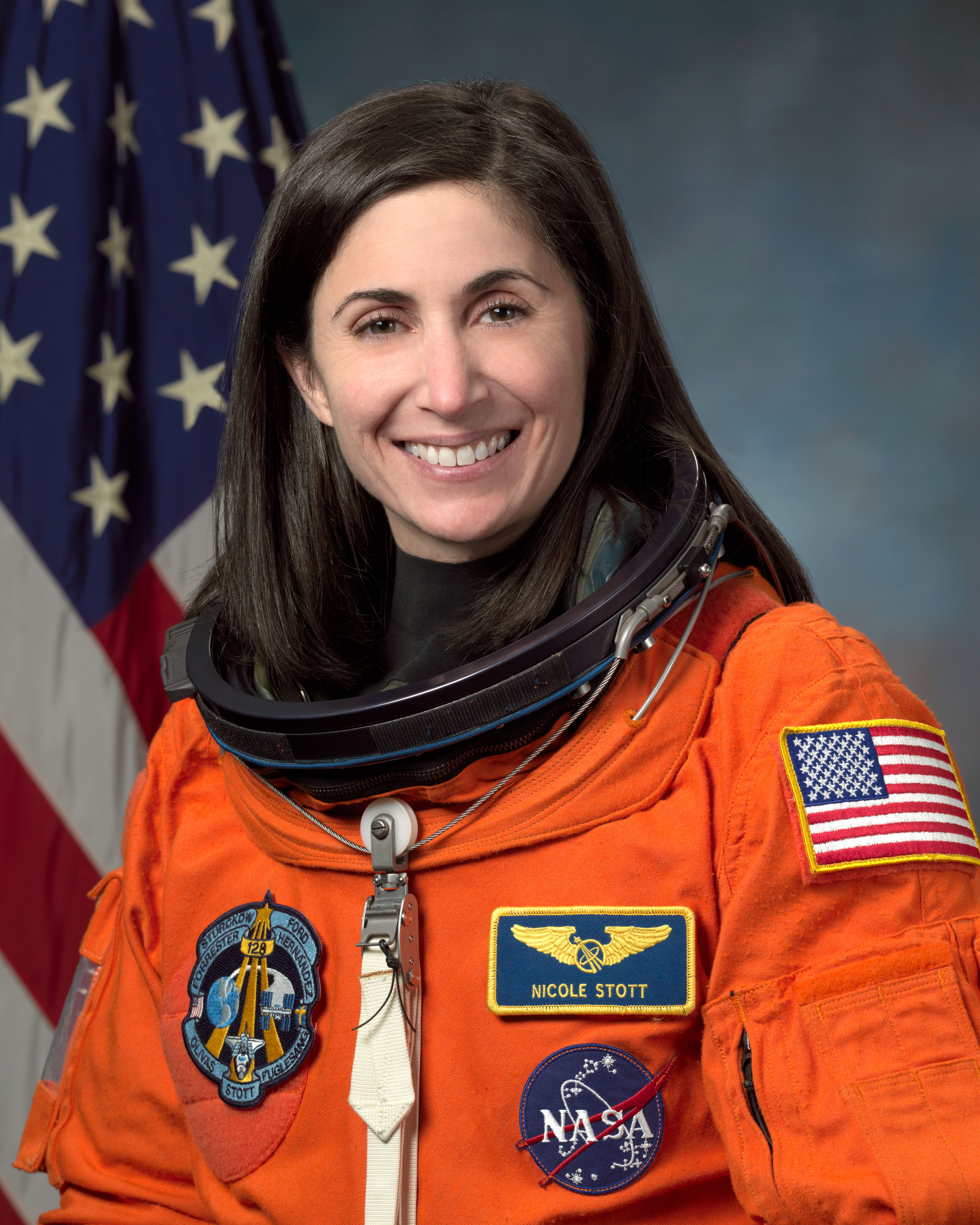
Nicole P. Stott

Notable alumni include U.S. Representative Gus Bilirakis; Henry Lyons, former president of the National Baptist Convention; Jim King, former president of the Florida Senate; Frank Wren, former general manager of the Atlanta Braves; Bob Carroll Jr., creator of I Love Lucy; astronaut Nicole P. Stott; James F. Sirmons, broadcast pioneer and CBS executive; and musician Jim Morrison, who attended SPC briefly.

== Partnerships ==
SPC collaborates with the Multijurisdictional Counterdrug Task Force Training and the Florida Army National Guard to provide tuition-free training for criminal justice professionals. Additionally, SPC is partnered with the Combating Transnational Organized Crime Center of Excellence, offering training to support U.S. Department of Defense strategies.
