= Walter Rogers Furness Cottage =

Historic house in Georgia, United States

- U.S. National Register of Historic Places
- U.S. Historic district – Contributing property
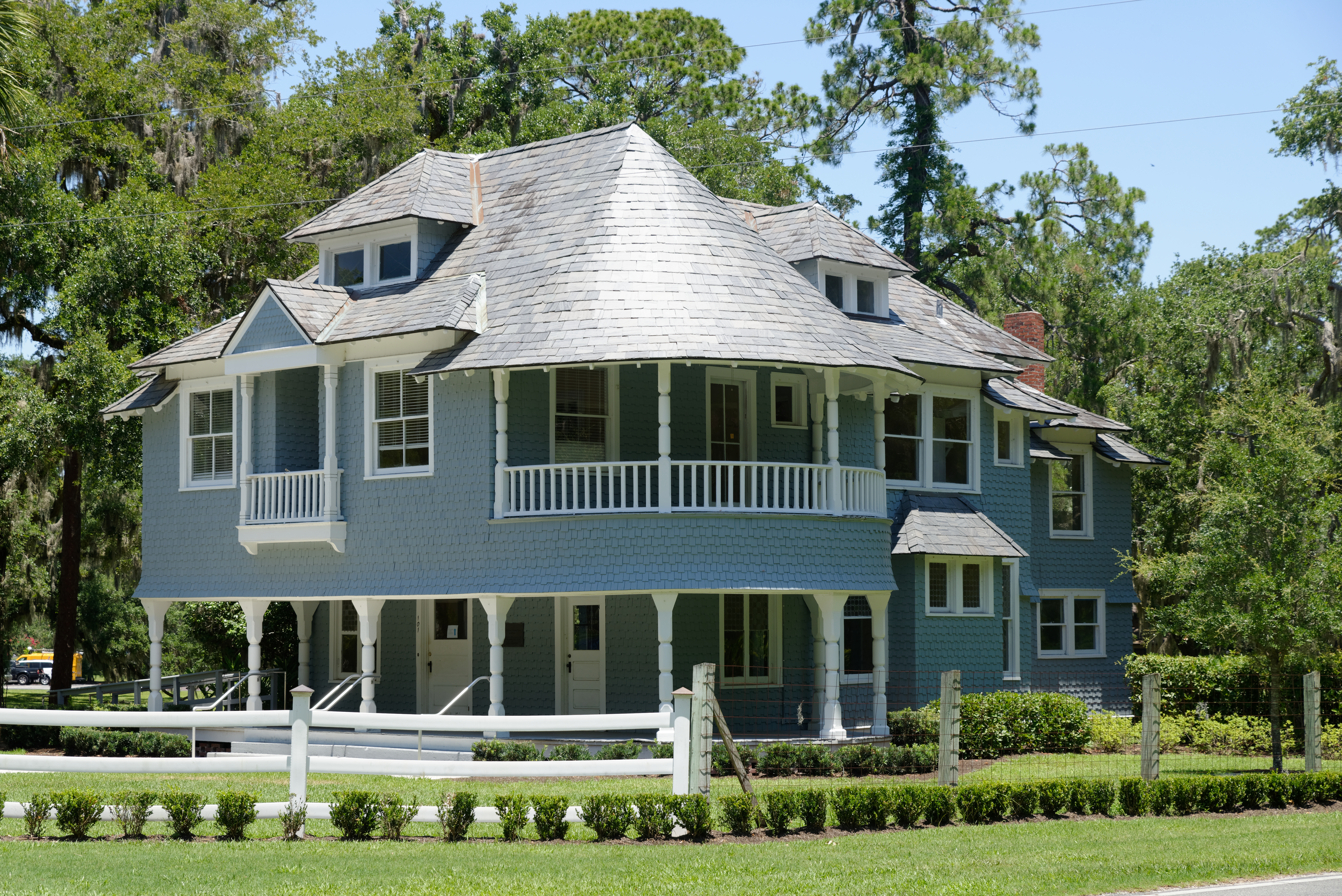
- Walter Rogers Furness Cottage in 2019.

- Location within Georgia
- Location: 101 Old Plantation Rd., Jekyll Island, Georgia
- Coordinates: 31°03′24.0″N 81°25′10.6″W
- Built: 1889–1891
- Architect: Furness, Evans & Company
- Architectural style: Shingle Style
- Part of: Jekyll Island Club Historic District
- NRHP reference No.: 72000385

Significant dates
- Added to NRHP: January 20, 1972
- Designated CP: June 2, 1978

Walter Rogers Furness Cottage
- Interactive map of the Walter Rogers Furness Cottage area

General information
- Construction started: 1889
- Completed: 1891
- Relocated: 1896, 1930
- Renovated: 1930, 2017

Technical details
- Material: wood shingles

Walter Rogers Furness Cottage (1890-1891) – also known as the "Old Infirmary" or the "Jekyll Island Infirmary" – is a Shingle Style building on Jekyll Island, in Glynn County, Georgia, United States.

It is one of thirty-three contributing properties in the 240-acre (97.1 hectares) Jekyll Island Club Historic District. The district was added to the National Register of Historic Places in 1972, and designated a National Historic Landmark District in 1978.

== Walter Rogers Furness ==
Walter Rogers Furness (1861–1914) was an American architect and real estate developer, and the eldest son of Shakespearean scholar Horace Howard Furness and Helen Kate Rogers. He attended private schools in Philadelphia and Harvard University. Like his friend and Harvard classmate, author Owen Wister, Furness traveled to the American West for recreation, hunting and fishing.

His uncle, Fairman Rogers, told him about plans to develop Jekyll Island as an exclusive winter hunting resort, and in 1886 Furness was the youngest of the fifty-three founding members of the Jekyll Island Club. That same year he married Helen Key Bullitt, and they had two children—Helen Kate (married Wirt Lord Thompson) and Fairman Rogers Furness. He worked for Furness, Evans & Company, the architectural firm founded by his uncle, Frank Furness, and was promoted to partner in 1896.

A member of the Racquet Club of Philadelphia, Furness was blinded in one eye while playing rackets in 1898. The injury made it difficult to draw with precision, so he gave up architecture. (Note: "The year 1898 is the last he is listed in the Philadelphia City Directory as a partner in the firm of Furness, Evans and Company." McCash, p. 86.) It made it impossible for him to aim a rifle, so he gave up hunting. (Note: "I am extremely sorry to hear about the injury to your eye, and that you do not think of coming down. Am also sorry that you want to dispose of your share, but will be pleased to put it forward, should I hear of a buyer." Ernest Gilbert Grob (Jekyll Island Club superintendent) to Walter Rogers Furness, 21 January 1899, quoted in McCash, p. 86.) He sold his shares in the Jekyll Island Club, and allowed his membership to lapse in 1901. He inherited his Rogers grandparents' Philadelphia city house, at the southwest corner of Locust Street and Washington Square West, and demolished it to build a 1909 office building (designed by Furness, Evans & Company). "Repeated bouts with alcoholism brought about strained relations with his family." His wife died at age 47 in January 1914, and he died of Bright's disease a month later, following a heart attack.

== Cottage ==
Walter Rogers Furness was listed as the Furness, Evans & Company individual-in-charge for the Jekyll Island cottage, often an indication of who within the firm was a building's primary designer. He and James W. Fassitt, (Note: James Wilson Fassitt Jr. was a Philadelphia architect, and Frank Furness's brother-in-law. He worked for Furness, Evans & Company, and was promoted to partner in 1886. Fassitt died unmarried at age 42. Thomas, p. 86.) a partner in the firm, visited Jekyll Island in February 1889. They seem to have brought hunting dogs with them, perhaps combining a hunting trip with selecting a building lot. (Note: June Hall McCash publishes a photograph of Walter Rogers Furness and James W. Fassitt posing with their four pointing dogs in a Savannah, Georgia portrait studio. McCash, p. 82.) Furness erected his cottage in the isolated southern part of the club compound, on a slightly sloping lot amid tall trees.

The twelve-room, 2 1/2-story cottage is slightly raised on footings. "The overhanging shingled volume of the second story is carried on slender, turned porch posts," creating a J-shaped covered porch beneath. The entrance is indicated by a Juliet balcony on the west façade, and the apsidal south façade features a peak-ceilinged semicircular sleeping porch on the second story. To the east is a 2 1/2-story section containing the dining room and kitchen, with bedrooms and servant quarters above.

The unusual apsidal-ended cottage is reminiscent of Frank Furness's apsidal-ended University of Pennsylvania Library (1888-1891), a building then under construction. Walter Rogers Furness's father served as chairman of the library's building committee, and was intimately involved in its planning and detailing. The library inspired the design of Frank Furness's own apsidal-ended country house, "Idlewild" (c.1890), built in the Philadelphia suburbs, just outside Media, Pennsylvania.

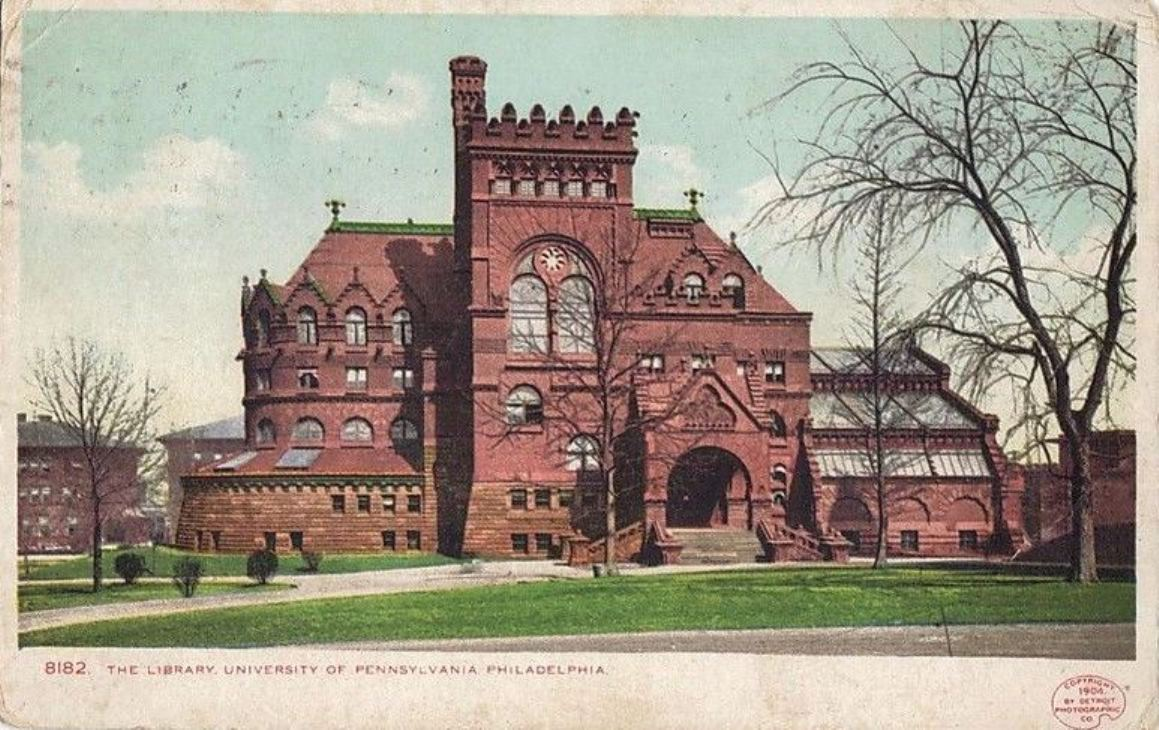
University of Pennsylvania Library (1888-1891)

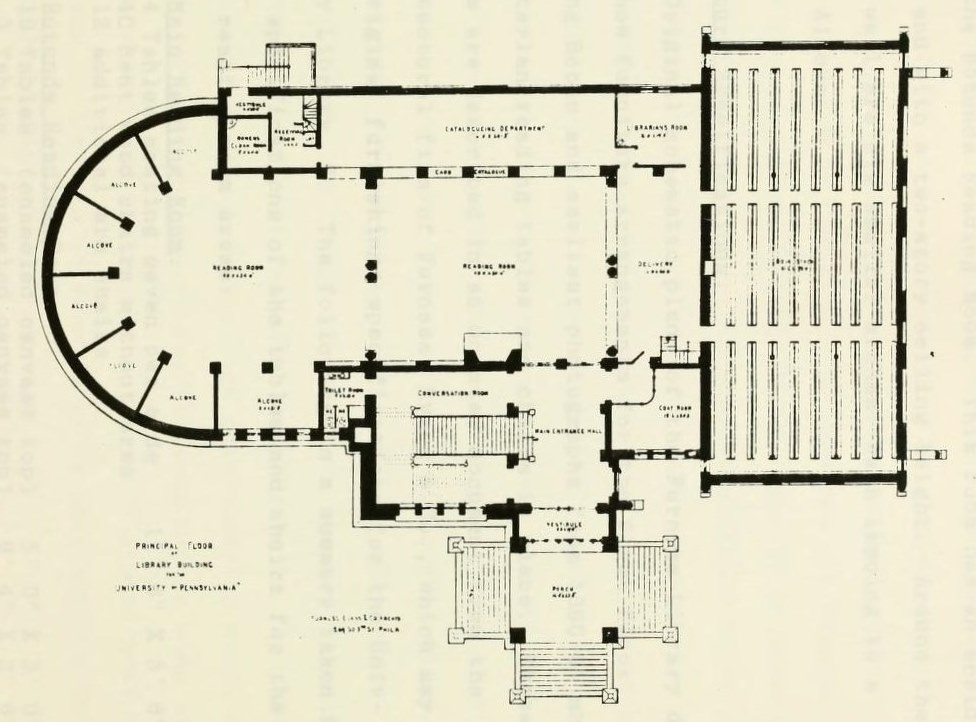
University of Pennsylvania Library plan

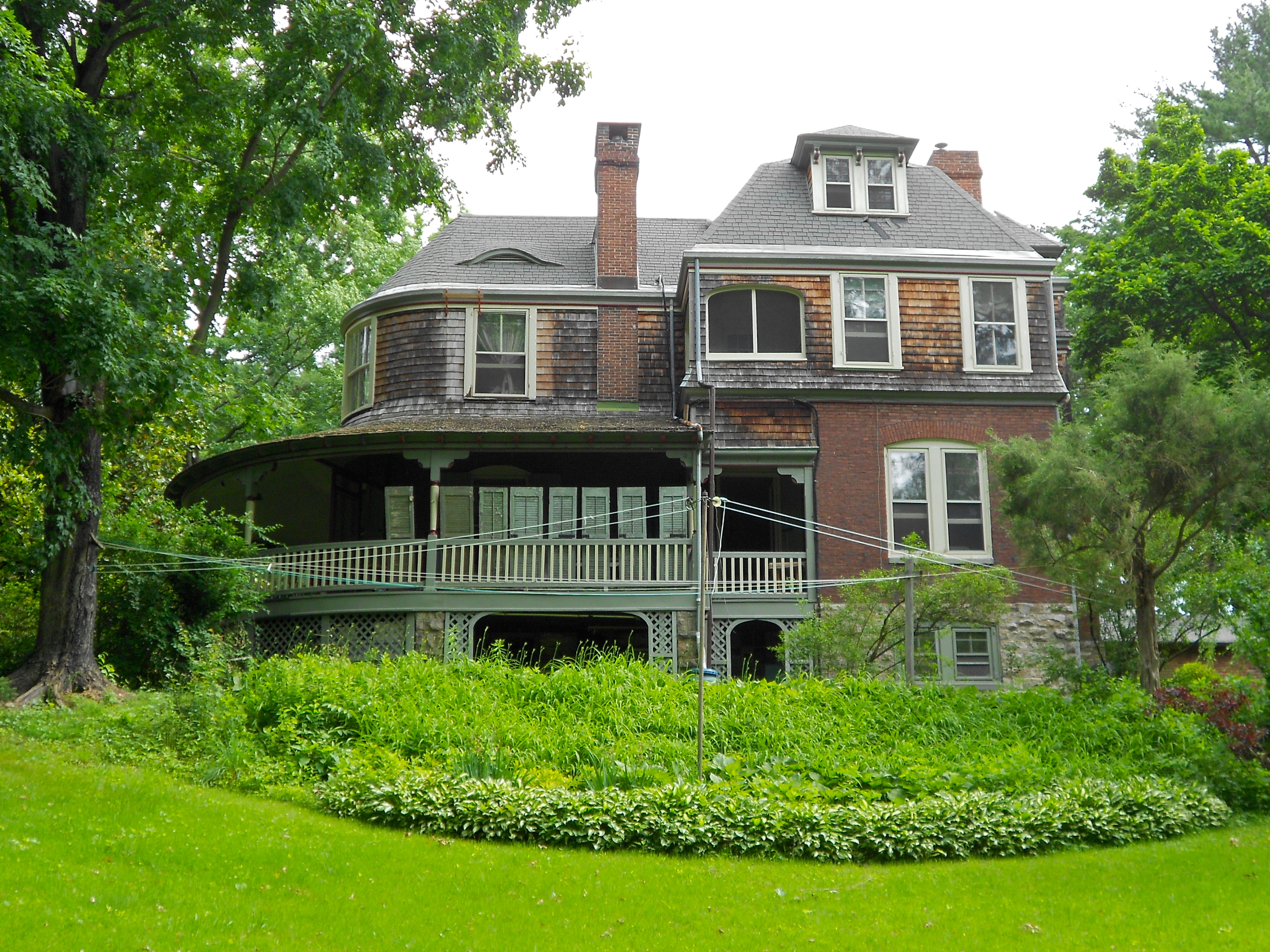
"Idlewild" (c.1890), Media, Pennsylvania

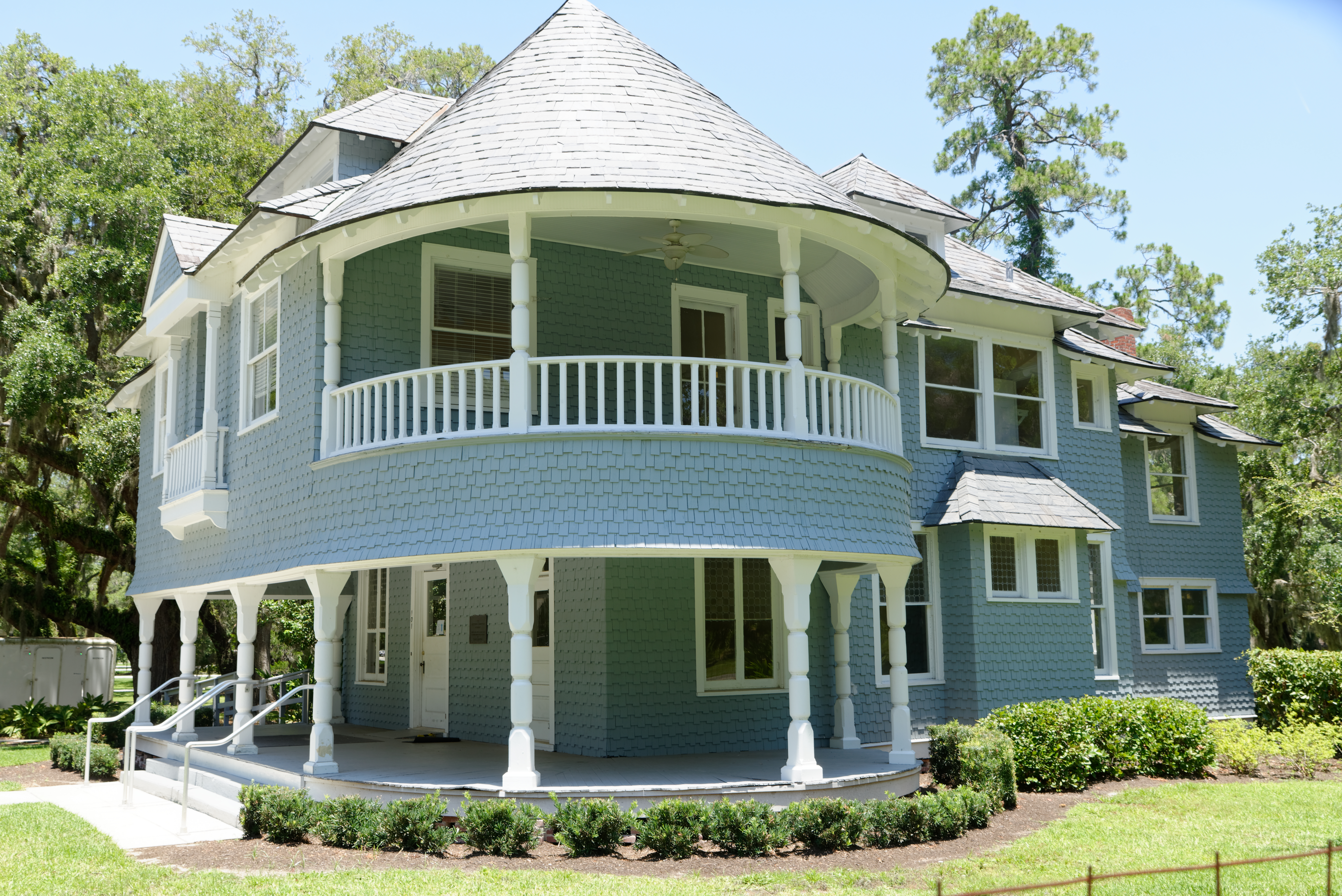
South facade

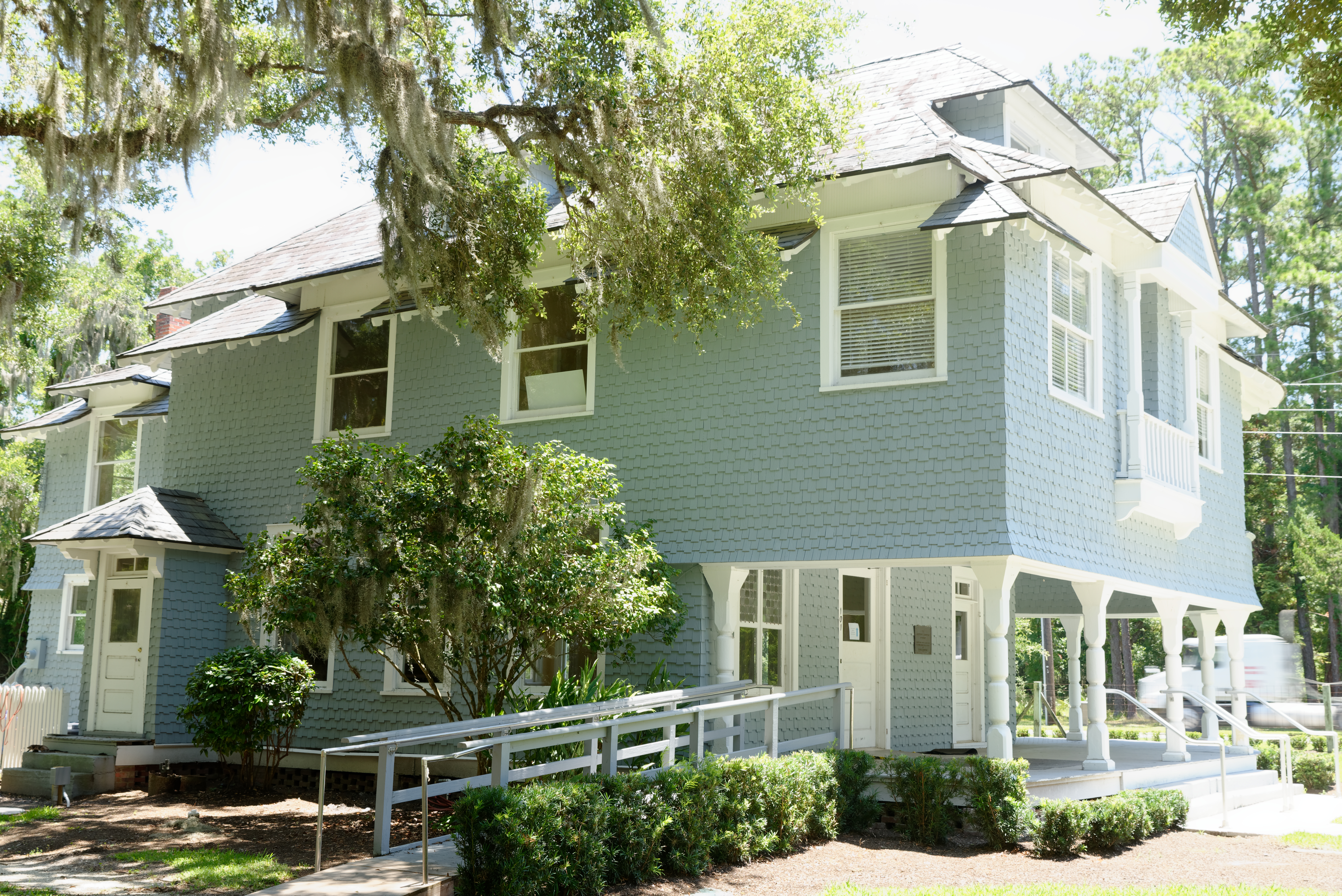
North façade

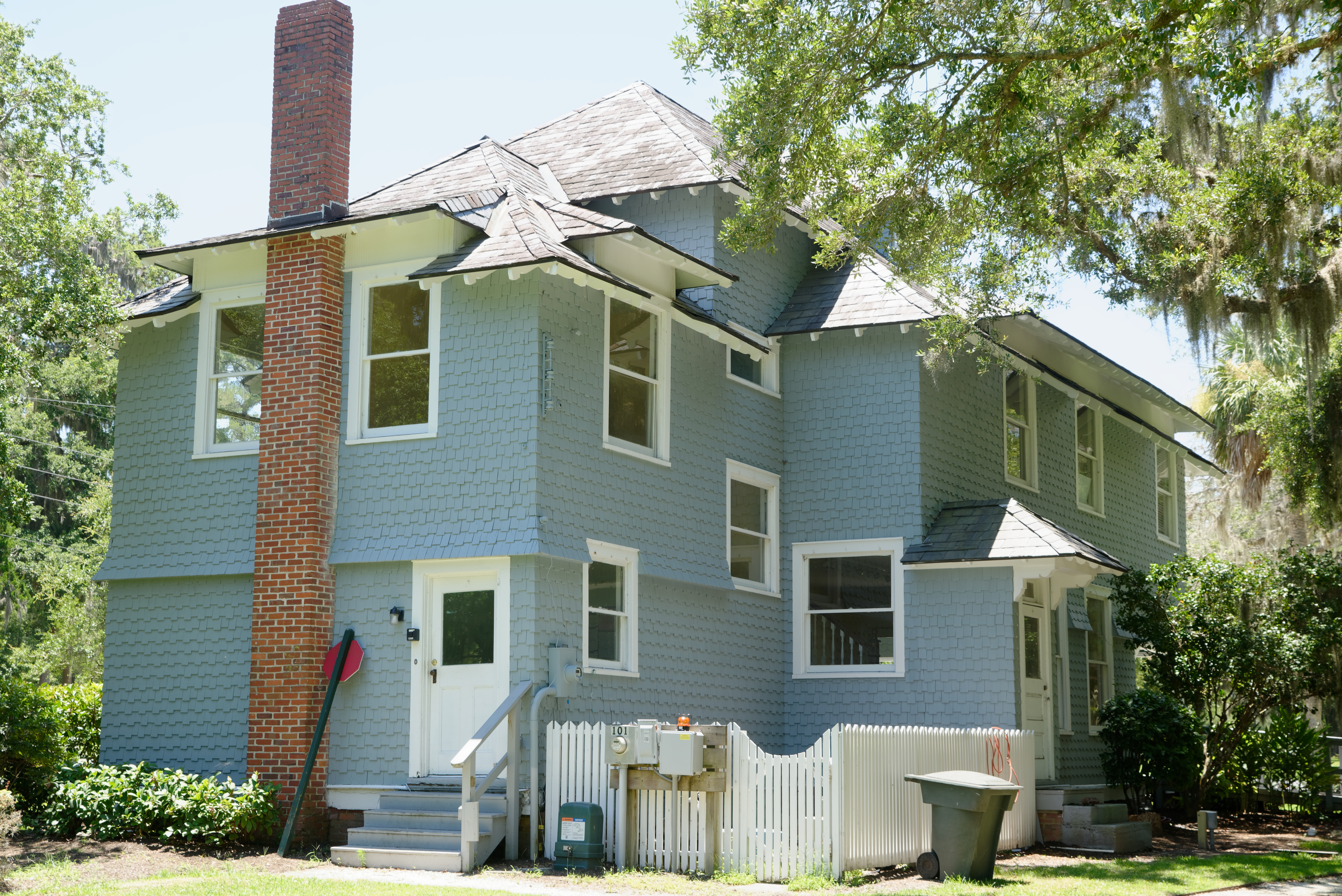
East (kitchen) façade

=== Later owners and occupants ===
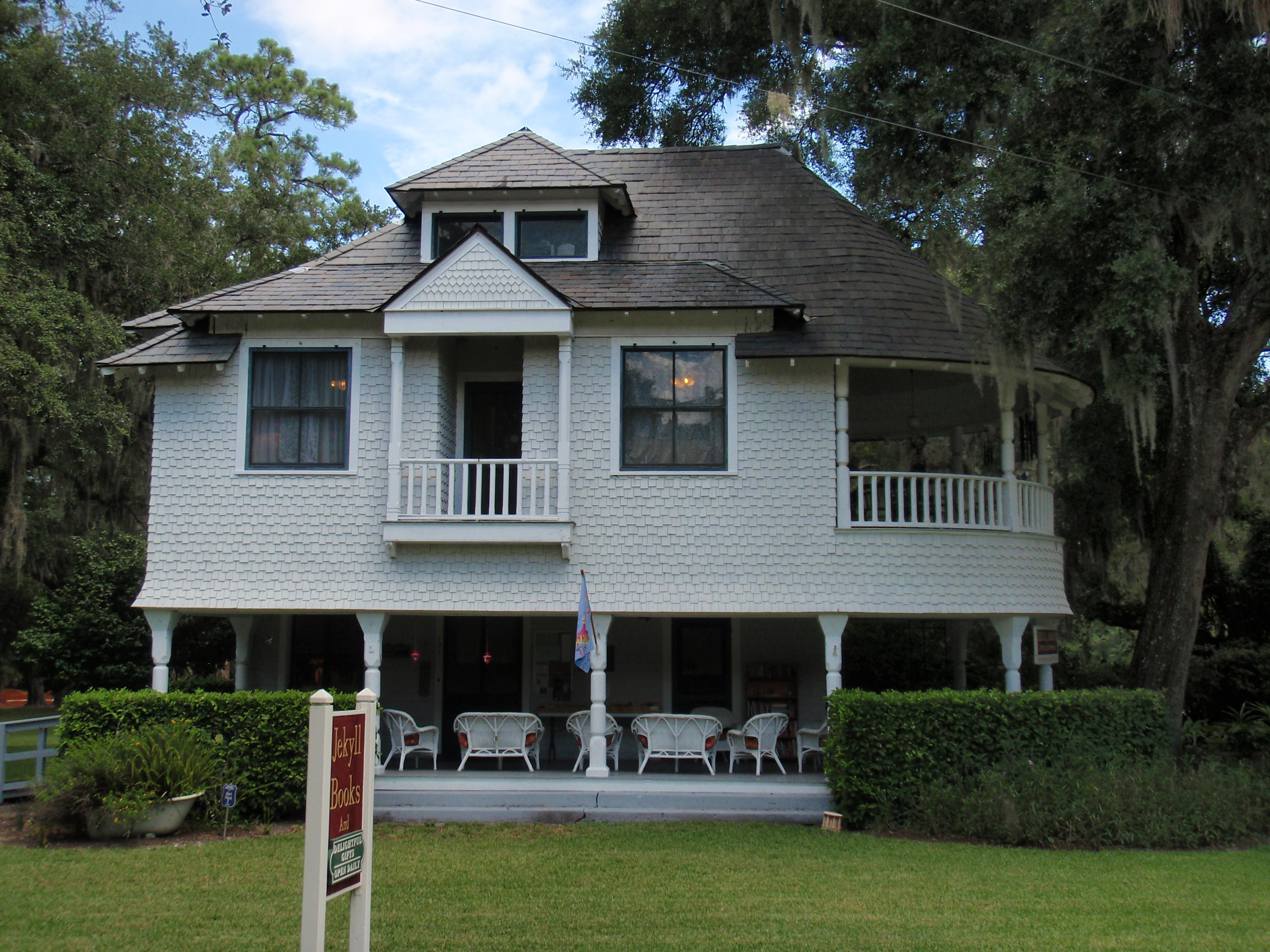
Jekyll Books occupied the cottage from 2001 to 2016.

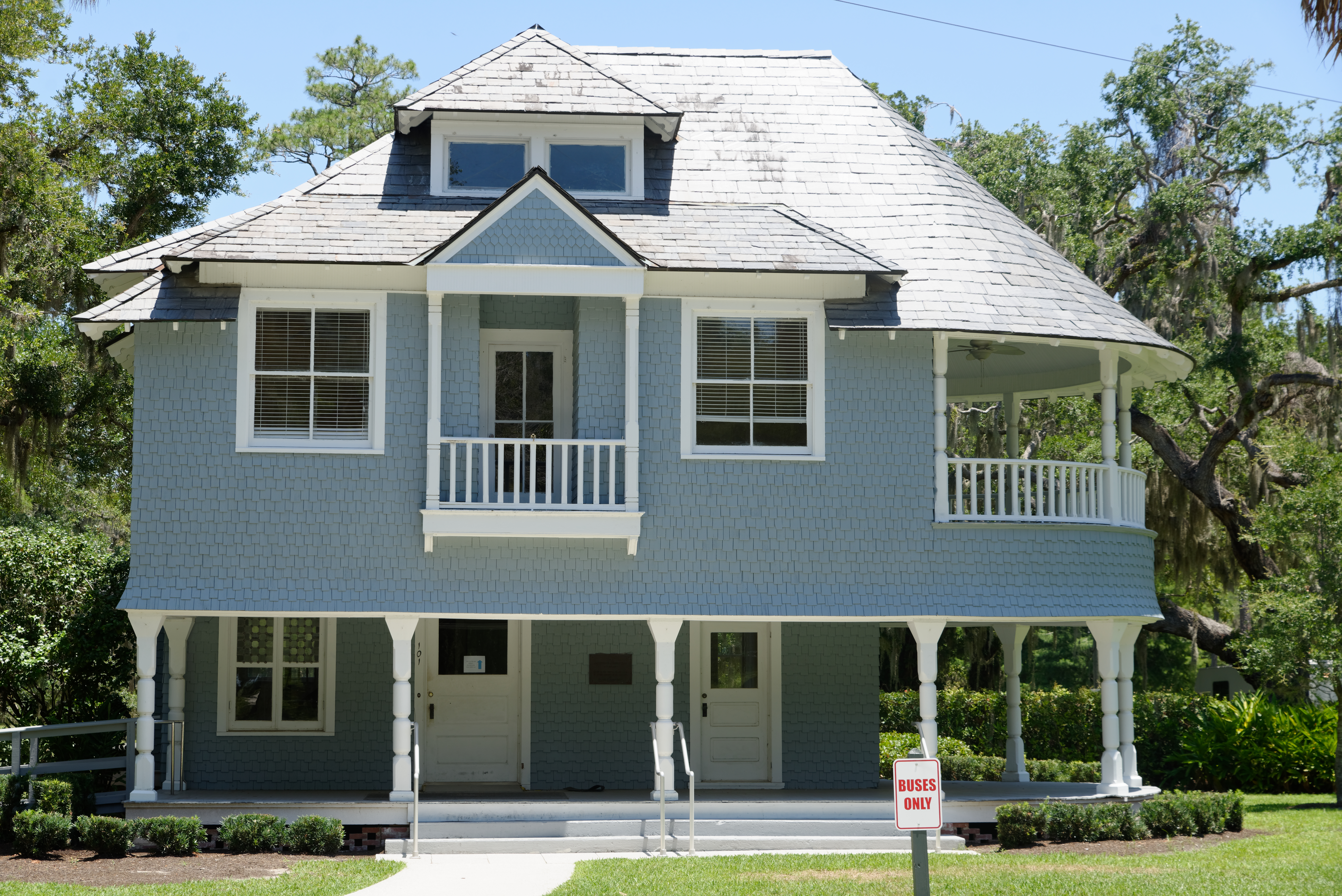
West façade, following the 2017 renovation

Publisher Joseph Pulitzer purchased the cottage from Furness in 1896, and had it moved to his building lot at Riverview Drive and Stable Road. He lived in the cottage through two winter "seasons" while his own twenty-six-room villa was under construction. He then slightly moved the cottage—about 125 ft (38 m)—and used it to house servants. Hydroelectric power magnate and art patron John J. Albright purchased the Pulitzer villa in 1914, slightly moved the Furness cottage—about 70 ft (21 m)—and also used it to house servants.

The parents of lumber executive Frank H. Goodyear, Jr. built an Italian villa on the club compound in 1906. He inherited their villa, and was himself elected to membership in 1916. Goodyear purchased the Furness cottage from Albright in October 1929, intending to relocate it. On January 21, 1930, it was moved a distance of about a quarter-mile (400 m), to the northeast corner of Old Plantation and Stable Roads (its current site). Goodyear renovated the cottage, equipped as an infirmary, and donated it to the club in memory of his mother. The Josephine Goodyear Memorial Infirmary was in operation from 1930 to 1942, when the Jekyll Island Club went out of business.

Georgia obtained Jekyll Island through eminent domain in 1947, and operated it as a state park for several years. The Jekyll Island Authority was created in the 1950s to conserve and develop the island. Various authority employees leased the Furness cottage as a residence, into the 1990s.

Hurricane Matthew hit Jekyll Island in October 2016, and the Furness cottage was damaged by a fallen tree. Repairs and renovations to the building were completed in Summer 2017. The restorers painted the cottage the same pale blue color that it had been in the 1930s and 1940s, when it served as Jekyll Island Infirmary.

The nearby Jekyll Island Museum moved its visitors center and gift shop to the cottage, while its own building underwent renovations. Following nearly two years of work, the Jekyll Island Museum reopened on April 27, 2019.

== See also ==
- Rockefeller Cottage
- Faith Chapel (Jekyll Island, Georgia)
- Georgia Sea Turtle Center
- Horton House
