= Jekyll Island Club =

- Jekyll Island Club Historic District
- U.S. National Register of Historic Places
- U.S. National Historic Landmark District
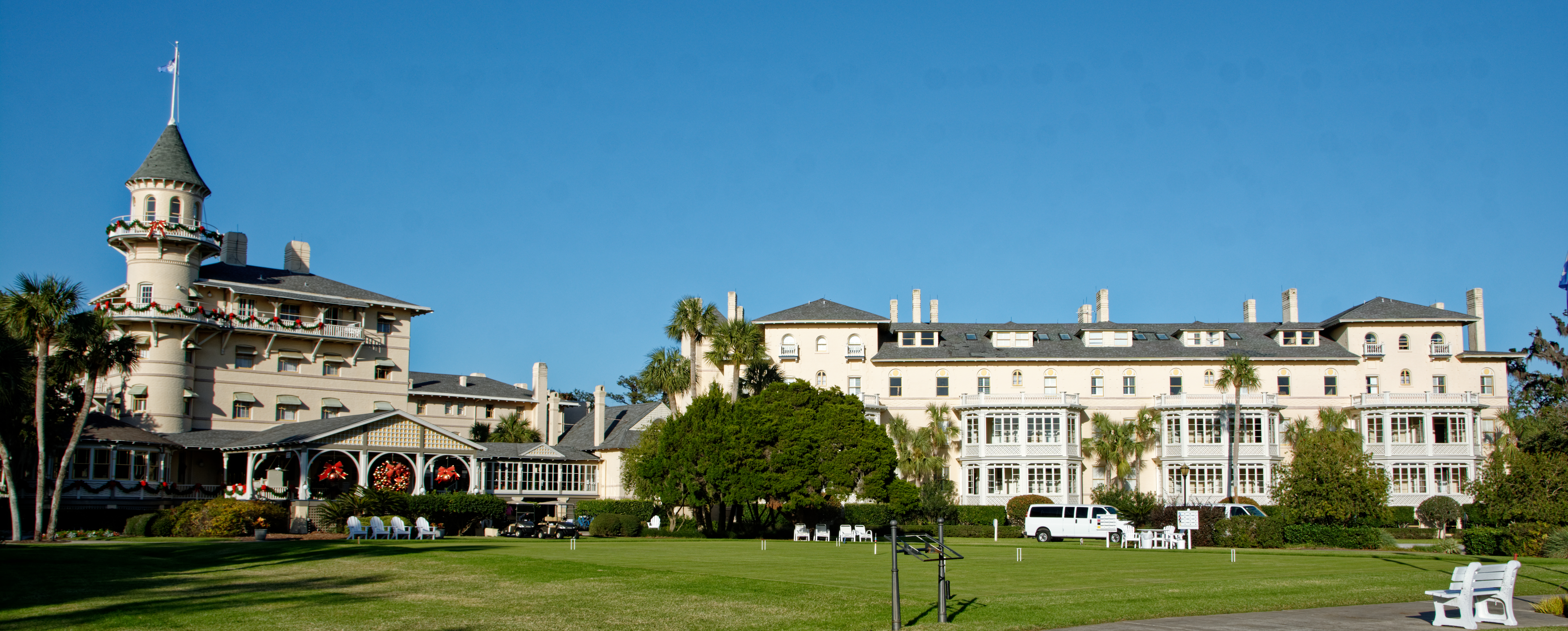
- Club House and Annex

- Location within Georgia Location within the United States
- Location: Jekyll Island, Georgia
- Coordinates: 31°3′38″N 81°25′19″W
- Area: 240 acres (97 ha)
- Built: 1884–1930
- Architect: Multiple
- Architectural style: Queen Anne
- NRHP reference No.: 72000385

Significant dates
- Added to NRHP: January 20, 1972
- Designated NHLD: June 2, 1978

The Jekyll Island Club was a private club on Jekyll Island, on Georgia's Atlantic coast. It was founded in 1886 when members of an incorporated hunting and recreational club purchased the island for $125,000 from John Eugene du Bignon. The original design of the Jekyll Island Clubhouse, with its signature turret, was completed in January 1888. The club thrived through the early 20th century; its members came from many of the world's wealthiest families, most notably the Morgans, Rockefellers, and Vanderbilts. In November 1910, leading members of the American financial sector, including Paul Warburg and members of J.P. Morgan, met on the island in secret to draft legislation for a central bank which would later influence the Federal Reserve Act.

The club closed during World War II, at the end of the 1942 season. In 1947, after five years of funding a staff to keep up the lawn and cottages, the island was purchased from the club's remaining members for $675,000 (about $7.4 million in 2017) during condemnation proceedings by the state of Georgia. The state tried operating the club as a resort, but this was not financially successful, and the entire complex was closed by 1971.

The complex was designated a historic landmark in 1978.

It was restored and reopened as a luxury resort hotel in 1985. Jekyll Island Club Hotel is a member of Historic Hotels of America, the official program of the National Trust for Historic Preservation.

== Founding ==
Jekyll Island Clubhouse

At the end of the plantation era of Jekyll Island, Newton Finney, suggested to du Bignon, his brother-in-law, that they might acquire the island and then sell it to Northern businessmen as a winter resort. A New York banker helped with the purchase of the entire island. By 1885, du Bignon was the sole owner of Jekyll.

In 1885, Finney and a New York associate, Oliver K. King, gathered a group of men and petitioned the Glynn county courts, becoming incorporated as the "Jekyl Island Club" on December 9, 1885. They agreed to sell 100 shares of the Jekyll Island Club stock to 50 people at $600 a share (about $15,000 in 2017).

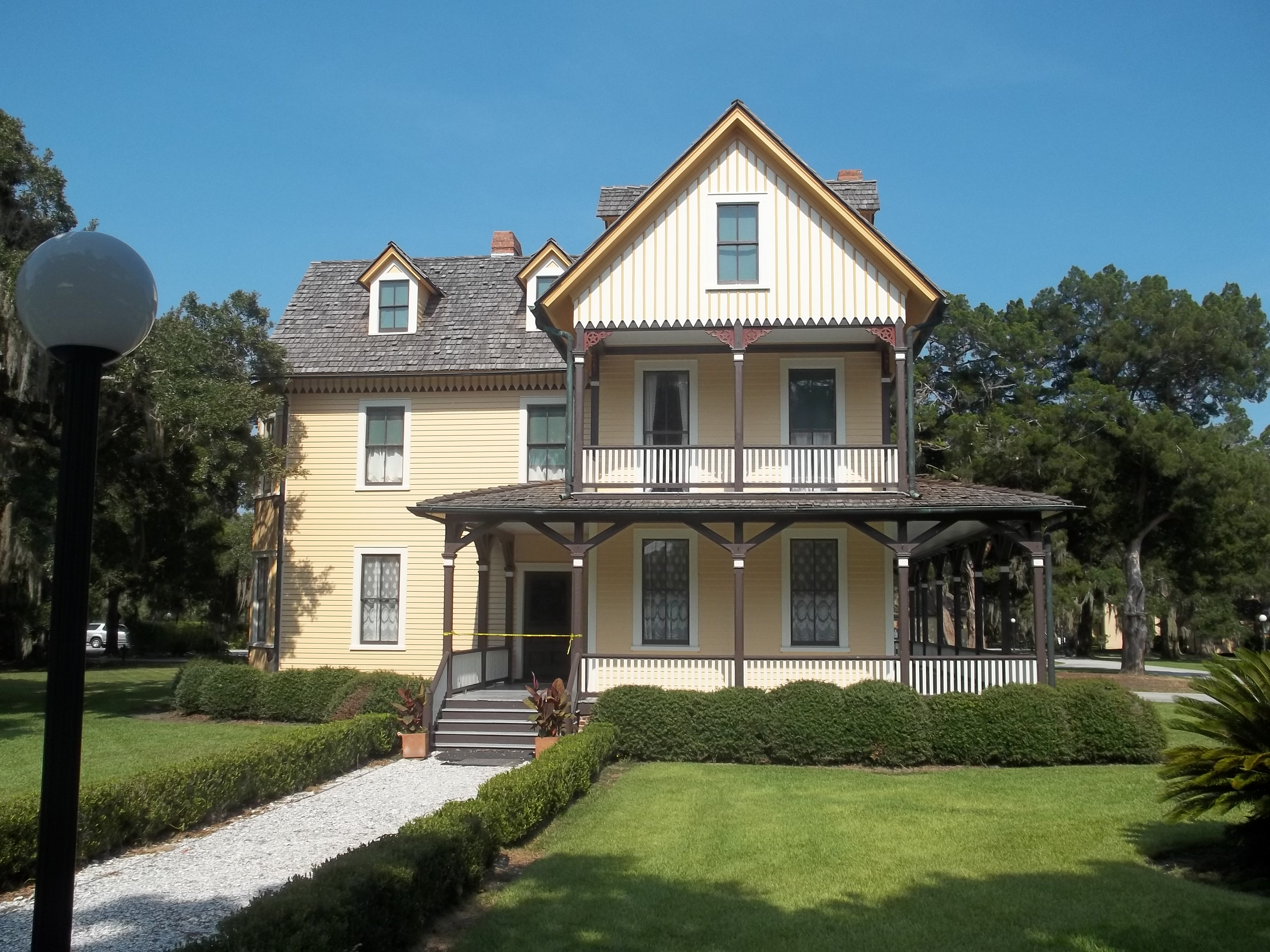
duBignon Cottage

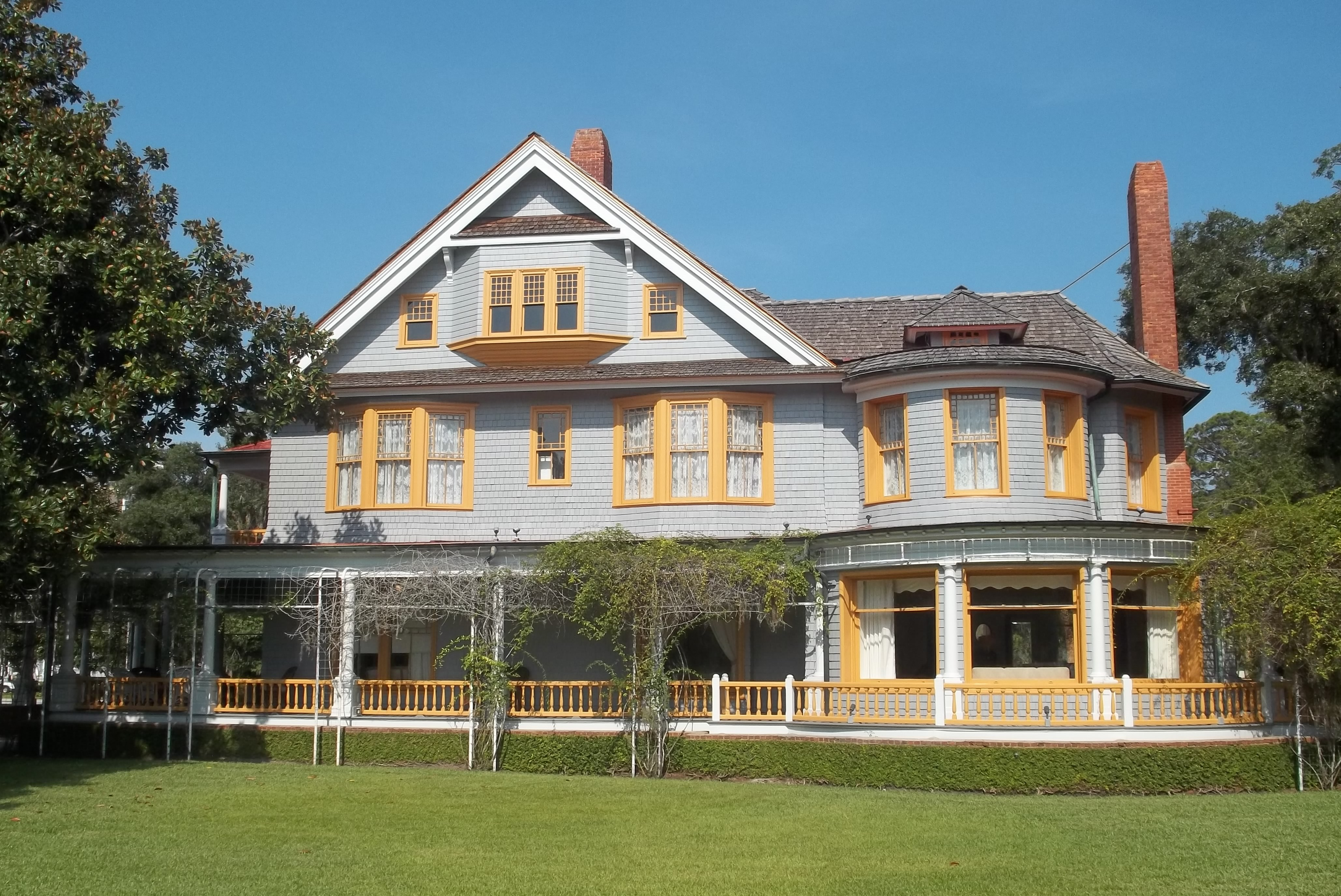
Rockefeller Cottage

Finney had no difficulty selling the shares. Six of the first seven shares went to the men who signed the charter petition: Finney, du Bignon, King, Richard L. Ogden, William B. D'Wolf, and Charles L. Schlatter. In all, Finney was able to find 53 people to join the club, including such famous names as Henry Hyde, Marshall Field, John Pierpont Morgan, Joseph Pulitzer, and William K. Vanderbilt.

On February 17, 1886, Finney signed an official agreement with du Bignon, who sold Jekyll Island to Finney's Jekyll Island Club for $125,000. On April 1, 1886, a meeting was held in New York to create the constitution and by-laws, and to nominate officers for the club. The first president was Lloyd Aspinwall, vice president was Judge Henry Elias Howland, treasurer was Franklin M. Ketchum, and Richard L. Ogden became secretary. These men faced the difficult task of turning the undeveloped property into a social club for the wealthy upper class of America.

Lloyd Aspinwall served just 5 months as the club president before he died suddenly. Henry Howland then took up the position as president of the club.

Committees were formed to get the club off the ground. Charles A. Alexander of Chicago was chosen to design the clubhouse, and Horace William Shaler Cleveland, a famous landscape architect, was chosen to design and lay out the grounds.

Ground was broken on the clubhouse building in mid-August 1886. After some setbacks the clubhouse was completed on November 1. The club officially opened its doors when the executive committee arrived for the 1888 season on January 21.

Several nationally important events took place on Jekyll Island during the Club era, including the first transcontinental telephone call made by Theodore N. Vail, president of AT&T, to Alexander Graham Bell, Thomas A. Watson and President Woodrow Wilson in 1915; and the development of the Aldrich–Vreeland Act for the National Monetary Commission in 1908.

== Recreation during the club era ==
The Jekyll Island Club had been a family oriented resort. It enjoyed great popularity among the elite classes, maintaining a highly exclusive character for 60 years.

When the club started out, hunting was a major recreational activity. A gamekeeper was hired to keep the island well-stocked with pheasants, turkeys, quail and deer.

All members were to report daily what they had killed and turn it over to the club. Wild game was a common sight on the menu of the clubhouse. A taxidermist shop was located within the club compound, specifically for mounting the prize game.

As the club grew, other recreations became popular. Golf eventually took over as the club's dominant sport. The first course was located just to the north of the Club compound. Later, in the 1920s, an ocean side course was built. A portion of this historic golf course is still intact, and can be played.

Other leisure activities included carriage driving, tennis, and bicycling.

== Role in the history of the Federal Reserve ==
Jekyll Island was the location of a meeting in November 1910 in which draft legislation was written to create a central banking system for the United States. Following the Panic of 1907, banking reform became a major issue in the United States. Senator Nelson Aldrich (R-RI), chairman of the National Monetary Commission, went to Europe for almost two years to study that continent's banking systems. Upon his return, he brought together many of the country's leading financiers to Jekyll Island to discuss monetary policy and the banking system, drafting legislation which was introduced in Congress as the "Aldrich Plan". Some ideas from the Aldrich Plan were later incorporated into the Federal Reserve Act.

On the evening of November 22, 1910, Sen. Aldrich and A.P. Andrews (Assistant Secretary of the United States Treasury Department), Paul Warburg (a naturalized German representing Kuhn, Loeb & Co.), Frank A. Vanderlip (president of the National City Bank of New York), Henry P. Davison (senior partner of J. P. Morgan Company), Charles D. Norton (president of the Morgan-dominated First National Bank of New York), and Benjamin Strong (representing J. P. Morgan), together representing about one quarter of the world's wealth at the time, left Hoboken, New Jersey on a train in complete secrecy, dropping their last names in favor of first names, or code names, so no one would discover who they all were. The excuse for such powerful representatives and wealth was to go on a duck hunting trip on Jekyll Island.

Forbes magazine founder Bertie Charles Forbes wrote several years later:

Picture a party of the nation's greatest bankers stealing out of New York on a private railroad car under cover of darkness, stealthily riding hundreds of miles South, embarking on a mysterious launch, sneaking onto an island deserted by all but a few servants, living there a full week under such rigid secrecy that the names of not one of them was once mentioned, lest the servants learn the identity and disclose to the world this strangest, most secret expedition in the history of American finance. I am not romancing; I am giving to the world, for the first time, the real story of how the famous Aldrich currency report, the foundation of our new currency system, was written ... The utmost secrecy was enjoined upon all. The public must not glean a hint of what was to be done. Senator Aldrich notified each one to go quietly into a private car of which the railroad had received orders to draw up on an unfrequented platform. Off the party set. New York's ubiquitous reporters had been foiled ... Nelson (Aldrich) had confided to Henry, Frank, Paul and Piatt that he was to keep them locked up at Jekyll Island, out of the rest of the world, until they had evolved and compiled a scientific currency system for the United States, the real birth of the present Federal Reserve System, the plan done on Jekyll Island in the conference with Paul, Frank and Henry ... Warburg is the link that binds the Aldrich system and the present system together. He more than any one man has made the system possible as a working reality.

== Decline and closure of the club ==
The Great Depression in 1929 caused great changes on Jekyll Island. This depression touched even the very wealthy across the country and membership in an exclusive club became an extravagance. Membership dropped slowly through the 1930s as the depression continued.

With the financial situation of the club worsening, the executive committee decided to create a new level of club membership in 1933. A more affordable level of membership, the Associate membership was designed to fit the needs, and pocketbook, of anyone. It was an attempt to draw in new and younger people as well as to draw more members back to the clubhouse. This new membership did revitalize the club membership roster, although only for a brief period.

World War II was the final blow to the life of the Jekyll Island Club. The club opened as usual for the 1942 season. However, by the beginning of March, it was announced there would be an early close to the season due to the club's financial situation and the strain the war had on the labor situation. U.S. Army troops bivouacked on Jekyll Island, manning observation watchtowers to spot German U-boats and using the club grounds for communications and a dining mess.

There was hope by the president that the Club might be reopened after the war with renewed interest. However, in 1946 the state of Georgia entered the picture. The state's revenue commissioner, Melvin E. Thompson, wanted to purchase one of Georgia's barrier islands and open it to the public as a state park. Finally, on June 2, 1947, the state purchased the island through a condemnation order for $675,000 (or approximately $5,563,416 in 2003 dollars).

The club was turned into a public resort by the state, but closed by 1971, a financial failure. It was made a historic landmark in 1978 and restored and reopened as the Radisson Jekyll Island Club Hotel in 1985. Radisson ceased managing the hotel some years later, and it currently operates as the Jekyll Island Club Resort.

== List of members ==
During the club's inception, a limit of 100 members was imposed to ensure the club's exclusiveness. During the financially difficult Great Depression period, the club began referring to its members as founders and created the new Associate Membership. This membership was purchased at a lower price, but with all of the benefits that the founders enjoyed, and limited to a total of 150.

This list includes many of the most notable members and is not exhaustive.

Member	Biography	Years
John J. Albright		1890–1931
Nelson W. Aldrich	American politician, daughter Abby married John D. Rockefeller Jr.	1912–1915
Lloyd Aspinwall	Owner of Howland & Aspinwall	1886–1886
Lloyd Aspinwall Jr.	Heir to Lloyd Aspinwall	1886–1892
George Fisher Baker	Founder of First National Bank of the City of New York predecessor to Citibank	1901–1931
Francis Bartlett		1886–1911
Frances Bartow		1931–1945
Anson Beard		1927–1929
John Eugene du Bignon		1886–1896
Cornelius Newton Bliss		1886–1911
Cornelius Newton Bliss Jr.		1912–1921
Matthew Chaloner Durfee Borden	The "Calico King", owner of the American Printing Company	1892–1912
Frederick Gilbert Bourne	President of the Singer Manufacturing Company between 1889 and 1905.	1901–1919
Marion Bourne		1919–1937
Marjorie Bourne		1920–1929
Robert Elbert Bourne		1926–1929
Robert Brewster	Son of Benjamin Brewster (financier) an early Standard Oil Trustee	1912–1939
Charles S. Brown		1924–1935
McEvers Bayard Brown	great-great grandson of Stephen Bayard	1886–1926
John Claflin		1886–1912, 1921–1938
Charles Richard Crane	Eldest son of plumbing parts mogul, Chicago manufacturer, Richard T. Crane	1916–1924
Florence Higinbotham Crane		1919–1940
Richard T. Crane	Founder of R.T. Crane & Bro., a Chicago-based manufacturer of valves and pipes that would later become an aerospace and plumbing manufacturer.	1911–1931
Robert Fulton Cutting		1923–1934
William Bayard Cutting		1886–1912
Charles M. Daniels		1924–1932
Charles Deering		1887–1902
John Eugene du Bignon		1886–1896
Duncan Steuart Ellsworth		1895–1908
James Ellsworth		1915–1924
Nathaniel Kellogg Fairbank		1886–1903
Walton Ferguson		1887–1922
Walton Ferguson Jr.		1902–1906
Marshall Field	Founder of Marshall Field's department stores.	1886–1906
Newton Sobieski Finney		1886–1897
Michael Gavin		1924–1933
Ogden Goelet	New York real estate developer and director of The Chemical Bank. He had a residence at 608 Fifth Ave., New York and a seasonal residence Ochre Point in Newport, Rhode Island	1886–1897
Robert Goelet	New York real estate developer and director of The Chemical Bank. He had residences at 591 Fifth Avenue, New York and seasonal residences at Tuxedo Park, New York and Ochre Point in Newport, Rhode Island	1886–1899
Frank H. Goodyear	Chairman of the board of the Buffalo and Susquehanna Railroad Co., Buffalo, New York and lumber business magnate.	1902–1907
Josephine Goodyear		1909–1915
Frank H. Goodyear Jr.		1916–1930
Edwin Gould	Son of railroad financier Jay Gould	1899–1933
George Jay Gould I	Son of railroad financier Jay Gould	1895–1916
Edward S. Harkness	Philanthropist and one of four sons of Stephen V. Harkness, a harness-maker who invested in the forerunner of Standard Oil, John D. Rockefeller's oil company	1911–1923
Edmund B. Hayes		1886–1921
James J. Hill	Founder of the Great Northern Railway (U.S.), the only transcontinental railroad built with no federal concessions or support	1888–1916
Bayard C. Hoppin		1925–1931
Gerard B. Hoppin		1923–1938
Alanson Houghton		1919–1941
Henry Howland		1886–1901
Dr. Walter James		1917–1927
Walter Jennings		1926–1933
Morris Ketchum Jesup		1888–1908
John Stewart Kennedy		1898–1909
Thomas W. Lamont		
Charles Lanier		1886–1911
Cornelius "Connie" Lee		1919–1947
Pierre Lorillard IV	Heir of the Lorillard Tobacco Company	1886–1886, 1888–1891
John Magee		1893–1908
George Macy	Founder of The Heritage Press	1902–1918
Valentine Everit Macy		1909–1927
Charles Stewart Maurice		1886–1924
Margaret Maurice		1924–1947
Cyrus Hall McCormick Jr.		1891–1936
Gordon McKay		1891–1903
J. P. Morgan	Financier, created United States Steel Corporation by buying Carnegie Steel and formed General Electric	1886–1913
J. P. Morgan Jr.	Philanthropist	1913–1943
William Fellowes Morgan		1925–1934
Richard Ogden		1886–1892
Rev. Charles H. Parkhurst		1894–1909
Henry Kirke Porter		1891–1921
Bernie Prentice		1928–1947
Joseph Pulitzer	Today, best known for the Pulitzer Prizes. Pulitzer was a journalist.	1886–1911
William Rockefeller	American financier, was a co-founder of Standard Oil with his older brother John D. Rockefeller.	1905–1922
Grant B. Schley		1903–1917
Dr. Frederick Shattuck		1912–1929
George Frederick Shrady Sr.		1904–1907
Hester Shrady		1908–1916
Frederick Snow		1915–1918, 1925–1929
Samuel Spencer	President of the Southern Railway	1898–1906
George Baker St. George	husband of Katharine St. George	1925–1933
William Strassburger		1919–1924
Alexander Thayer		1929–1937
Theodore Newton Vail	President of American Telephone and Telegraph	1912–1920
Cornelius Vanderbilt II	The first son of William Henry Vanderbilt, an American industrialist and philanthropist who built his wealth in shipping and railroads, and grandson of "The Commodore" Cornelius Vanderbilt.	
William Kissam Vanderbilt	The second son of William Henry Vanderbilt, from whom he inherited $55 million, and grandson of "The Commodore" Cornelius Vanderbilt,	1886–1902
William Warren Vaughn		1919–1931
George Whitney		1928–1941

Associate Members: (This class of membership was adopted in 1933)

Member	Years
William Truman Aldrich	1933-?
Lynford Biddle	1928–1933
John Foster Dulles	1933-?
Robert Gardner	?
David Sinton Ingalls	?
Julian Myrick	?
George Herbert Walker	1933-?

== Presidents ==
- 1886–1887 — Lloyd Aspinwall
- 1887–1896 — Henry Howland
- 1897–1914 — Charles Lanier
- 1914–1919 — Frederick Bourne
- 1919–1927 — Dr. Walter James
- 1927–1933 — Walter Jennings
- 1933–1938 — J.P. Morgan Jr.
- 1938–1942 — Bernon Prentice

== Jekyll Island Club Historic District ==
Map of the Historic District from 1930

Jekyll Island Club Historic District is a National Register of Historic Places (NRHP) historic district and National Historic Landmark District in Glynn County, Georgia. Located on the west side of Jekyll Island, the 240-acre (97.1 hectares) district is roughly bordered by Riverview Drive to the west, and the long arc of Stable Road (Old Village Boulevard) to the north, east and south. It contains thirty-three contributing properties from the Jekyll Island Club, including the separately-NRHP-listed Rockefeller Cottage and Faith Chapel. Jekyll Island Club Historic District was added to the NRHP on January 20, 1972, and was designated a national historic landmark district on June 2, 1978.

From 1967 to 1968, Savannah landscape architect Clermont Huger Lee created a master development plan with the goal to restore the area known as "Millionaire's Village" to its 1910–1929 era. Though not fully implemented, Lee's plans served as a foundation in the redevelopment of today's Jekyll Island Historic District.

=== Contributing properties ===
Key:
Separately NRHP-listed
Non-contributing properties
Demolished properties

Name	Image	Year	Location/ GPS Coordinates	Architect	Architectural Style	Material	Notes
Baker-Crane Carriage House		Built c.1890	101 James Road		Queen Anne Revival		Built for Frederic Baker, whose adjacent cottage, Solterra, burned in 1914; Later owned by Richard Teller Crane Jr., who demolished Solterra to build Crane Cottage
Boat Engineer's Cottage		Built 1916	21 Pier Road				Built by the club to house its boat engineer, John Courier; Currently houses a gift shop, Something For Everyone
Bookkeeper's Cottage; Stephens Cottage		Built 1900	32 Pier Road; 31.058961°N 81.418586°W				Built by the club to house its bookkeeper, Julius A. Falk; Currently houses The Cottage Gift Shop
Chauffeurs' Dormitory		Built 1905	17 Pier Road; 31.05866666°N 81.41953333°W				Currently houses Island House Gifts; The rear addition houses Jekyll Island U.S. Post Office
Cherokee Cottage; Shrady-James Cottage		Built 1904	191 Old Plantation Road; 31.060983°N 81.42211°W	Carrere & Hastings	Italian Renaissance Revival		Built for George Frederick Shrady Sr. Later owned by Dr. Walter Belknap James; Cherokee Cottage in 1911:
Club House		Built 1887	371 Riverview Drive; 31.059116°N 81.4220421°W	Charles A. Alexander	Queen Anne Revival		In an 1886 perspective drawing:
Club House Annex		Built 1901–1903	Old Plantation Road; 31.059088°N 81.421478°W	Charles Alling Gifford	Italian Renaissance Revival		"The Annex" featured eight 4-bedroom condominium apartments on the first and second floors, twenty guest bedrooms on the third floor, and servant bedrooms on the fourth floor.
Commissary		Built c.1900	24 Pier Road; 31.0590046°N 81.4200983°W				Currently houses Just By Hand, a handicrafts shop
Crane Cottage		Built 1917–1918	371 Riverview Drive; 31.060596°N 81.4226187°W	Adler & Dangler	Mediterranean Revival	stucco over brick Ludowici tile roof	Built for Richard Teller Crane Jr., on the site of Solterra (burned 1914); Courtyard:
DuBignon Cottage; Club Cottage		Built 1884; Relocated 1896	171 Old Plantation Road; 31.0588°N 81.4206°W		Stick Style		Only building that pre-dated 1886 establishment of the Club. Originally stood on site of San Souci Apartments. Relocated to present site, 1896
Faith Chapel		Built 1904; Renovated 1970	181 Old Plantation Road; 31.060556°N 81.421667°W	Howard Constable	Shingle Style	wood shingles	The tower's terracotta gargoyles are based on those of Notre-Dame de Paris: King David Window by Louis Comfort Tiffany:
Furness Cottage		Built 1889–1891; Renovated 1930; Renovated 2017	101 Old Plantation Road; 31.056667°N 81.419611°W	Furness, Evans & Company	Shingle Style	wood shingles	Built for Walter Rogers Furnes. Relocated 1896 and 1930. Served as Jekyll Island Infirmary, 1930–1942. Damaged by Hurricane Matthew, 2016
Georgia Sea Turtle Center; Jekyll Island Power Plant		Built c.1903 Renovated 2006	214 Stable Road; 31.059926°N 81.419540°W			brick	The Georgia Sea Turtle Center opened in 2007
Goodyear Cottage		Built 1903–1906; Renovated 1973	321 Riverview Drive; 31.0565°N 81.4218°W	Carrere & Hastings	Italian Renaissance Revival		Goodyear Cottage in 1911:
Gould Casino Auditorium		Built 1902; Remodeled 1957	203 Old Plantation Road; 31.06215°N 81.42251°W	Walter Blair			Built by Edwin Gould as indoor tennis courts.
Hollybourne Cottage		Built 1890	379 Riverview Drive; 31.0622°N 81.423°W	William H. Day		tabby concrete	Built for Charles Stewart Maurice. Hollybourne Cottage in 1911:
Jekyll Island Authority; Administration Building			100 James Road				Built as a dormitory for married servants. Currently houses offices of the Jekyll Island Authority
Jekyll Island Authority Offices			James Road; 31.059758°N 81.420372°W				Built as a dormitory for single servants.
Jekyll Island Museum; Club Stables		Built 1897; Renovated 2017–2019	100 Stable Road; 31.058290°N 81.417889°W				Reopened April 27, 2019, following a two-year renovation
Jekyll Island U.S. Post Office (rear of Chauffeur's Dormitory)			17-A Pier Road; 31.0588276°N 81.4210029°W				
Mistletoe Cottage; Claflin-Porter Cottage		Built 1900	Riverview Drive; 31.0568059°N 81.4218°W	Charles Alling Gifford	Dutch Colonial Revival	wood shingles	Built for Henry Kirke Porter. John Claflin purchased it in 1926
Morgan Tennis Court		Built 1930	151 Old Plantation Road; 31.058049°N 81.420588°W				Named for Club president J. P. Morgan Jr.
Moss Cottage		Built 1896	341 Riverview Drive; 31.055843°N 81.421647°W		Dutch Colonial Revival	wood shingles	Built for William Struthers Jr. Later owned by George Henry Macy. Moss Cottage in 1911:
Pump House		Built c.1925	south of Morgan Tennis Court				
Rockefeller Cottage; Indian Mound Cottage		Built 1892; Expanded c.1910	361 Riverview Drive; 31.0575°N 81.421944°W		Shingle Style	wood shingles	Rockefeller Cottage in 1911: Built for Gordon McKay. Bought by William Rockefeller, 1905.
San Souci Apartments		Built 1896	365 Pier Road; 31.05815°N 81.42144°W	Charles Alling Gifford	Shingle Style	wood shingles	Built by Henry Baldwin Hyde as a 6-unit condominium J. P. Morgan owned one of the apartments
San Souci Boiler House		Built 1896	150 Old Plantation Road; 31.0579269°N 81.4209922°W				Visible at far right in a 1911 photograph: Built to provide heat and hot water for San Souci Apartments. Currently houses the Island Sweets Shoppe
Solterra Dovecote		Built c.1890 Restored 2016	Old Plantation Road				Visible just left of center in a 1911 photograph: Built for Frederic Baker. Survived 1914 burning of Solterra Cottage.
Staff Dining Hall		c.1910	13 Pier Road; 31.0586831°N 81.4202132°W				Currently houses Remember When
Villa Marianna		Built 1929	201 Old Plantation Road; 31.062011°N 81.4223338°W	Mogens Tvede	Mediterranean Revival		Built for Frank Miller Gould, named for his daughter
Villa Opso		Built 1927	381 Riverview Drive; 31.062855°N 81.423218°W	John Russell Pope	Mediterranean Revival		Built for Walter Jennings; Takes its name from the Guale name for Jekyll Island
Wharf; Jekyll Landing Wharf			1 Pier Road; 31.0582°N 81.4242°W				Wharf in 1911:

=== Non-contributing and demolished properties ===
Name	Image	Year	Location/ GPS Coordinates	Architect	Architectural Style	Material	Notes
Brown Cottage		1888; Demolished c.1944	North Riverview Drive; 31.0689°N 81.42598°W	William Burnet Tuthill	Queen Anne Revival		Built for McEvers Bayard Brown
Chichota Cottage		Built 1897; Demolished 1941	375 Riverview Drive; 31.06128333°N 81.42325°W		Beaux-Arts		Built for David H. King Jr. Entrance through a courtyard with swimming pool. Edwin Gould purchased the cottage in 1900. Chichota's entrance steps, flanked by lions, and its swimming pool survive:
Dairy Barn		Built 1910	North Riverview Drive; 31.078317°N 81.423733°W				Remnants of the dairy barn's concrete grain silo survive
Doc's Snack Shop							
James Memorial Swimming Pool		1927	west of Club House				Named for Club president Dr. Walter Belknap James
Jekyll Island Amphitheater		Built 1973	North Stable Road; 31.064822°N 81.420033°W				
Public Restroom			behind Faith Chapel				
Pulitzer-Albright Cottage		Built 1897–1898; Expanded 1899, 1904; Burned 1950s	Riverview Drive; 31.0555°N 81.4212°W	Charles Alling Gifford	Italian Renaissance Revival		Built for Joseph Pulitzer. Pulitzer relocated the Furness Cottage to his building plot, 1896, and lived in it while his cottage was under construction. Later owned by John J. Albright
Red Row			North Stable Road; 31.064822°N 81.420033°W				Ten houses built by the Club for African-American employees. The workers were displaced in 1947, when Georgia purchased the island. Jekyll Island Amphitheater was built on the site in 1973
Schoolhouse		Built 1901	Schoolhouse Lane				Children of white employees were taught at the schoolhouse. A schoolhouse for black children was later built.
Skeet House		Built 1930s Relocated 2014	Pier Road; 31.059005°N 81.420098°W				Relocated about 1 mi (1.6 km) from former shooting range Currently stands beside Du Bignon Cottage
Solterra; Baker Cottage		Built 1890–1891; Burned 1914	Riverview Drive; 31.06064°N 81.42298°W		Queen Anne Revival		Built for Frederic Baker. Crane Cottage (1918) was built on Solterras's site. Solterra Dovecote and the Baker-Crane Carriage House survive
Union Chapel		Built 1898; Relocated c.1904	North Stable Road				African-American church, near Red Row
Water Tower/Windmill		Built 1891. Destroyed 1898. Rebuilt 1898. Destroyed 1928	Old Plantation Road				Located just east of the Club House. Both water towers/windmills were destroyed by hurricanes

== See also ==
- List of National Historic Landmarks in Georgia (U.S. state)
- National Register of Historic Places listings in Glynn County, Georgia
