= Jekyll Island Museum =

Museum in Jekyll Island, Georgia, United States

Mosaic, Jekyll Island Museum
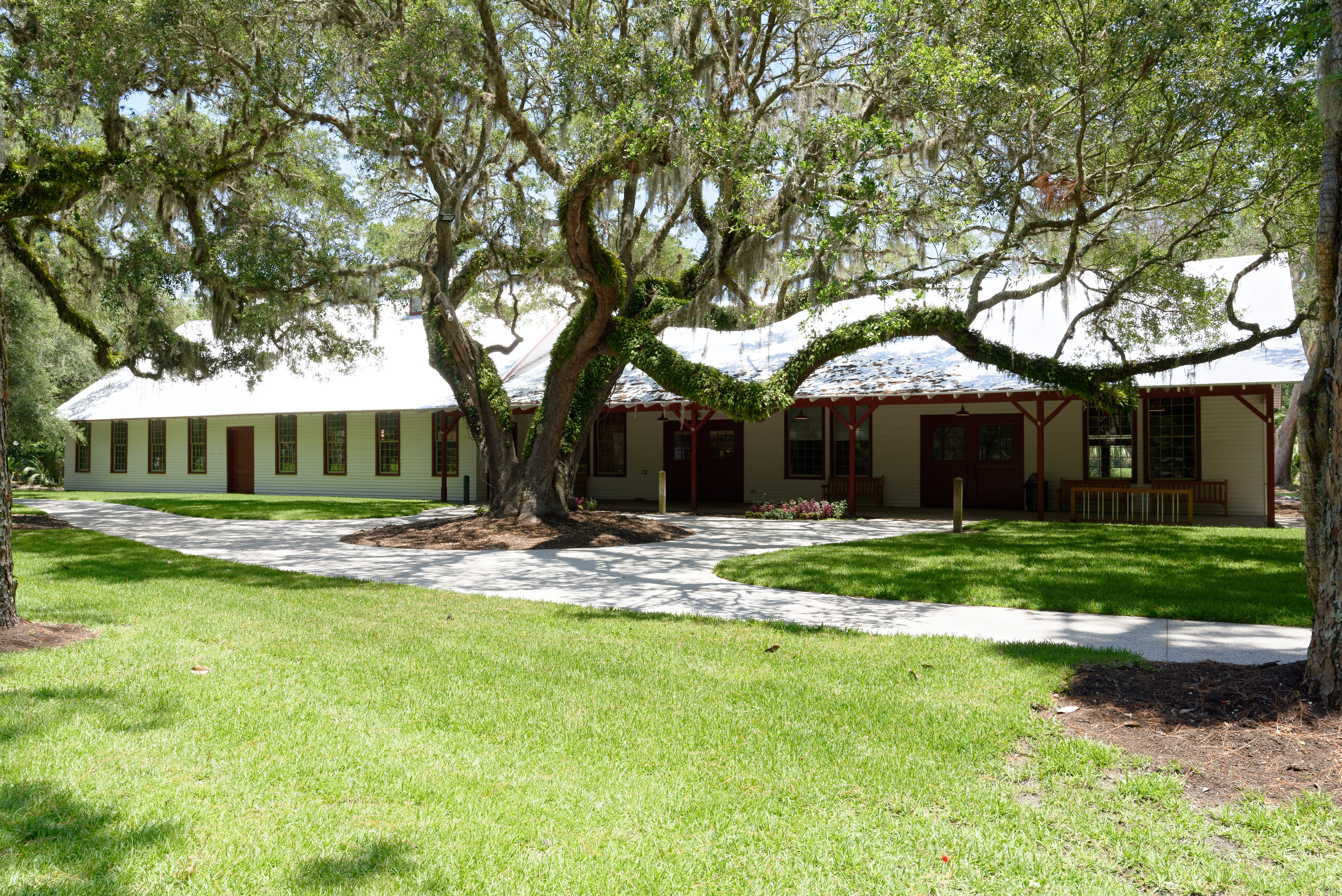

- Location within Georgia
- Former name: Jekyll Island Museum
- Location: Jekyll Island, Georgia
- Coordinates: 31.058364°N 81.417947°W
- Type: Heritage centre
- Website: www.jekyllisland.com/history/museum/.

Mosaic, Jekyll Island Museum (formerly known as the Jekyll Island Museum) is a history museum in the historic district of Jekyll Island of Georgia, in the United States.

== History and location ==
The historic Club Stables, located on Stable Road, is now the home of the Jekyll Island Museum. This historic building was renovated by Weber Group, Inc. and Main Street Design in 2018, and re-opened spring of 2019. The museum features more exhibit space, more artifacts, a new outdoor classroom, and a new multi-purpose room. Constructed completely within the current footprint of the historic stables building, the new design highlights the building’s construction with high, lofted ceilings and open space.

The museum serves as a gateway for daily tours of Jekyll Island’s 90-acre (360,000 m^{2}) National Historic Landmark District, including the restored Indian Mound Cottage, a 25-room mansion, and the historic remains of Horton House. The Historic District includes the Jekyll Island Clubhouse (now the Jekyll Island Club Hotel, a fully functional and award-winning four-star historic hotel), 11 cottages, the historic wharf (now a seafood restaurant), the historic power plant (now the Georgia Sea Turtle Center), club-era employee housing and a shopping area consisting of numerous historic buildings once used during the club-era.
