= World Turtle Day =

Annual observance

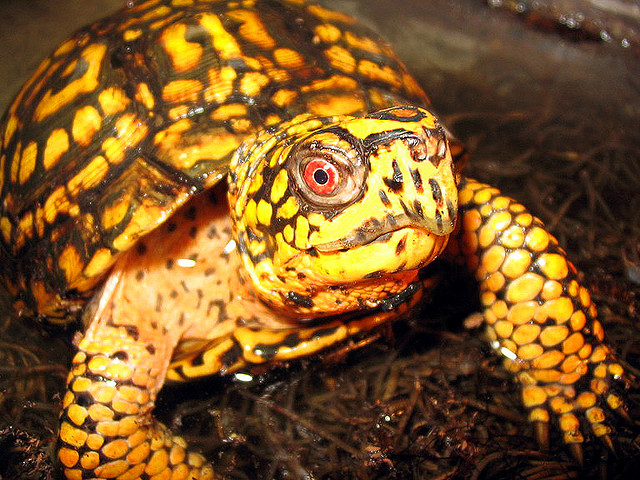
- Eastern box turtle, Terrapene carolina carolina
- Date: May 23
- Frequency: Annual

World Turtle Day is an annual observance held every May 23rd. It began in 2000 and is sponsored by American Tortoise Rescue. The day was created as a yearly observance to help people celebrate and protect turtles and tortoises and their disappearing habitats, as well as to encourage human action to help them survive and thrive. A study on the effects of biodiversity awareness days listed World Turtle Day as an example of how they increase the internet search traffic on the protected species.

The term "World Turtle Day" is trademarked by Susan Tellem of Malibu, California.
