= Lyman Reed Blake =

American inventor

- Born: August 24, 1835; South Abington, Massachusetts
- Died: October 3, 1883 (aged 48)
- Occupation: Inventor
- Known for: invention of a sewing machine for sewing the soles of shoes to the vamp of the shoe

Lyman Reed Blake (August 24, 1835 – October 3, 1883) was an American inventor who devised a sewing machine for sewing the soles of shoes to the vamp of the shoe. Born in South Abington, Massachusetts, Blake started off in the shoemaker business at a young age, first working for his brother Samuel. Blake later worked in inventor Isaac Singer's company, Singer Corporation, setting up sewing machines in shoe factories. By 1856, he had become a partner in a shoemaking company and spent his time inventing machines to help speed up the process of shoemaking.

Two years later, on July 6, 1858, Blake received a patent from the United States government for his sewing machine for helping attach the soles of shoes to the upper of the shoe. The sewing machine helped permit the production of low-cost shoes by eliminating the heavy work of hand sewing. Blake then sold the patent to Gordon McKay a year after for $8,000 in cash and a $62,000 share of future profits. Blake later worked for McKay from 1861 until his retirement in 1874, working on improving the machine. The McKay sole-sewing machine was at the top of the market for twenty-one years in both the United States and Great Britain. Blake died on October 5, 1883, at the age of 48.
