= American Tortoise Rescue =

US nonprofit organization

American Tortoise Rescue (ATR) is an animal rescue organization dedicated to the rescue, rehabilitation, adoption and protection of all tortoise and turtle species, and the protection of their environments. Located in Malibu, California, ATR is a United States 501(c)(3) nonprofit corporation.

Since its founding in 1990 by husband-and-wife team Marshall Thompson and Susan Tellem, ATR had rescued over 1,000 turtles and 2,000 tortoises as of 2009. The organization's in-house population "floats" at about 125 animals. Beginning in 2000, ATR sponsored World Turtle Day in an effort to increase awareness of the plight of turtles and tortoises and the environments that support them.
