= Pittsfield Cemetery =

Historic cemetery in Massachusetts, United States

- U.S. National Register of Historic Places
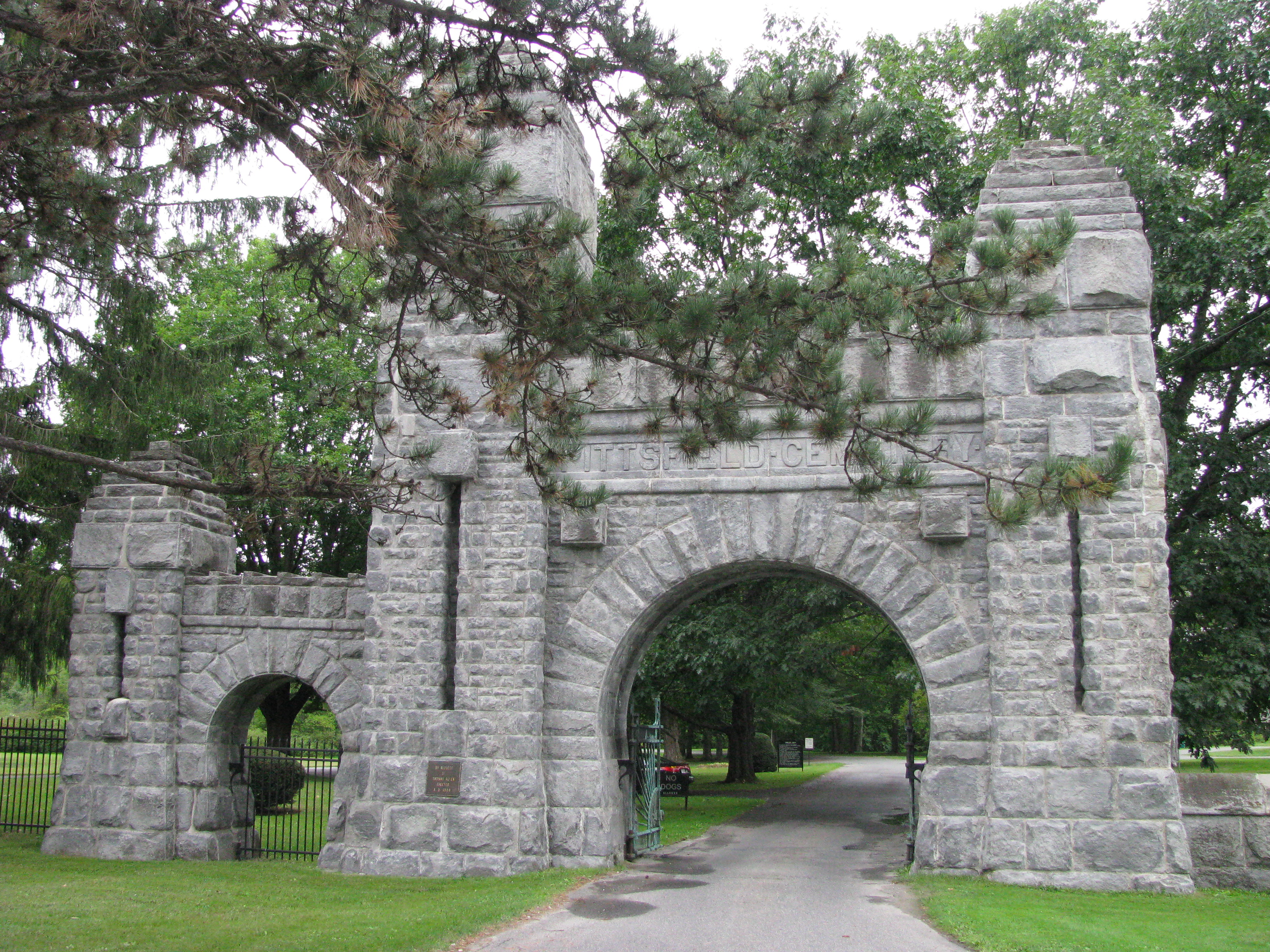
- The Allen Memorial Arch and Gateway

- Location within Massachusetts Location within the United States
- Location: 203 Wahconah St., Pittsfield, Massachusetts
- Coordinates: 42°28′1″N 73°15′28″W
- Area: 142 acres (57 ha)
- Built: 1850
- Architect: Horatio Stone; Olmsted Brothers, et al.
- NRHP reference No.: 07000145
- Added to NRHP: March 13, 2007

Pittsfield Cemetery is a historic cemetery at 203 Wahconah Street in Pittsfield, Massachusetts. Established in 1850, it is good example of a rural cemetery and is the resting ground of many prominent Pittsfield residents with a number of architecturally significant elements. It also houses a number of Pittsfield's earliest burials which were relocated here from a cemetery near the city center. The cemetery was listed on the National Register of Historic Places in 2007.

== Description ==
Pittsfield Cemetery is located north of downtown Pittsfield, on 142 acres (57 ha) west of Wahconah Street. This land includes a largely undeveloped tract between Onota Street and Valentine Road. The area between Wahconah Street and Onota Street is about 83 acres (34 ha), and is the area that was laid out in 1850. Laid out in the fashionable rural cemetery style, the cemetery features winding lanes for circulation, and plantings of specimen trees.

The easternmost area of the cemetery, between Onota Brook and Wahconah Street, is an entry area with no burial sites. It includes the entrance arch, a two-story superintendent's house, and the Calvin Memorial Chapel. A structure originally built as a receiving tomb has been converted into a crematorium.

== History ==
The cemetery was initially laid out in 1850 prompted by the city's growing population and because Pittsield's principal burying ground at North and East Streets was full. Although the cemetery started without much fanfare or styling in 1850, over the next 100 years it acquired a number of interesting elements. Funds for the Allen Memorial Arch and Main Gate were donated in 1885 by Thomas Allen Jr., and provide an imposing entry to the facility. A memorial to Allen elsewhere in the cemetery is believed to be the largest piece of red granite in the world. In 1900 the chapel was dedicated. In the 1930s cemetery officials added the Superintendent's Cottage and a Maintenance Garage. As the cemetery grew in the 1910s, the noted Olmsted Brothers landscape firm was retained to plan the layout of new sections of the cemetery.

== See also ==
- National Register of Historic Places listings in Berkshire County, Massachusetts
