= Rockefeller Cottage =

Historic house in Georgia, United States

- U.S. National Register of Historic Places
- U.S. Historic district
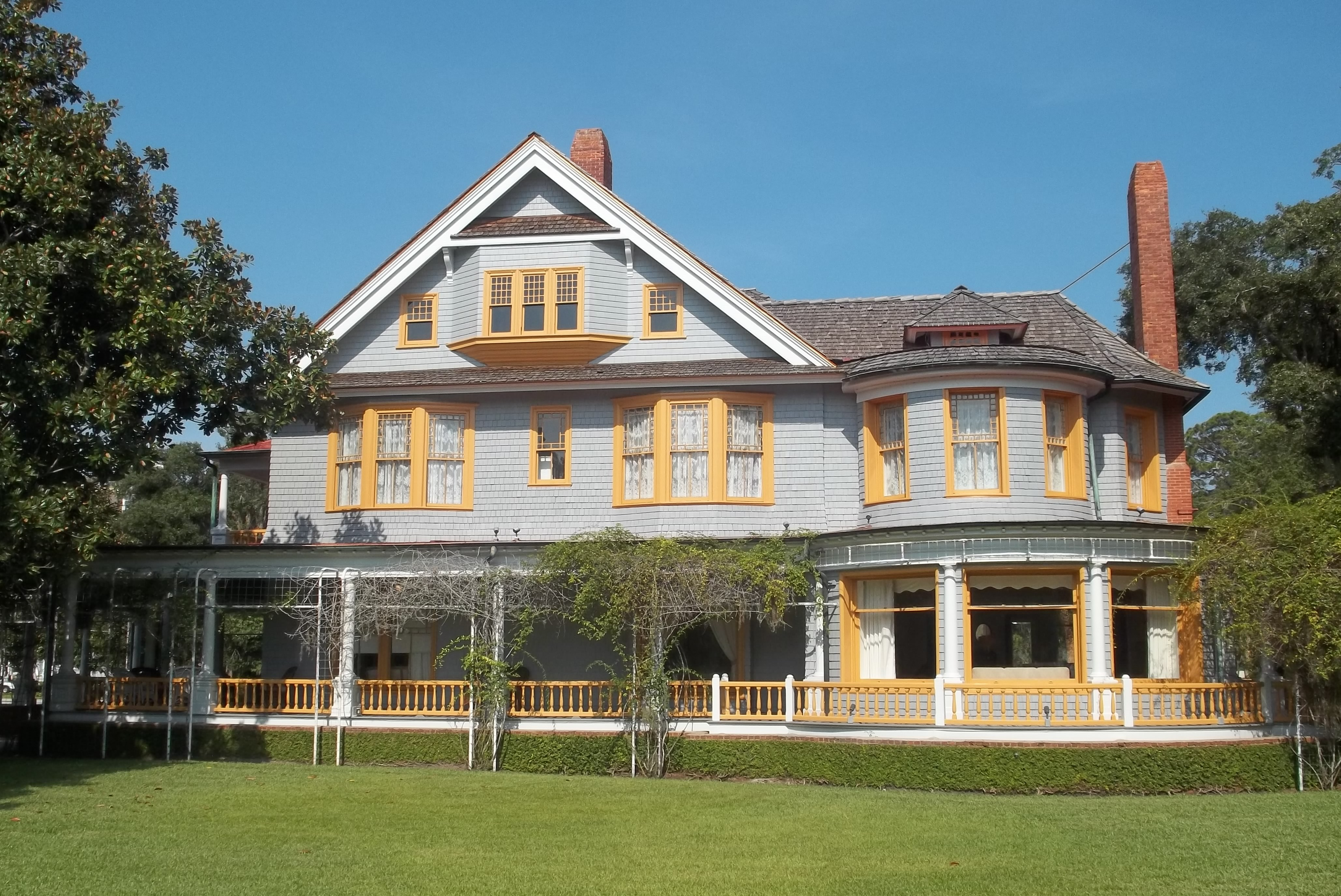

- Location within Georgia
- Location: 331 Riverview Dr., Jekyll Island, Georgia
- Coordinates: 31°3′27″N 81°25′19″W
- Area: 2.7 acres (1.1 ha)
- Built: 1892
- Architectural style: Shingle Style, Rural American
- NRHP reference No.: 71000279
- Added to NRHP: July 14, 1971

The Rockefeller Cottage, also known as Indian Mound Cottage, is a house on Jekyll Island, Georgia. It is located next to the Jekyll Island Club, stands three stories high, and has a total of 25 rooms. There are nine bedrooms, nine bathrooms, and seven servant rooms. The house has many distinguishing features such as an elevator, a cedar-lined walk-in safe, and taps for hot and cold salt water on the bathtub in the master bedroom bath. Tours of the mansion are provided by the Jekyll Island Museum.

== History ==
The house was built by businessman Gordon McKay in 1892 and called Indian Mound Cottage. McKay died in 1903, and the house was bought by William Rockefeller Jr. in 1905. Rockefeller used it as a winter home and made extensive changes to the house. The house remained in the Rockefeller family until 1947, when the Jekyll Island Authority bought the property. It was open as a museum from 1950 until 1968, when it was closed for badly needed repairs. In 1971, the Indian Mound Cottage was listed on the National Register of Historic Places as "Rockefeller Cottage." It is now part of the Jekyll Island Club National Historic Landmark District.

== Mound ==
The house took its original name from a mound in the front yard. The mound was once thought to be an Indian burial ground for the Guale Indians, who were the earliest inhabitants of the island. The mound was later found to be a shell midden left by the Indians.
