= Georgia Sea Turtle Center =

Coordinates: 31.059926°N 81.419540°W

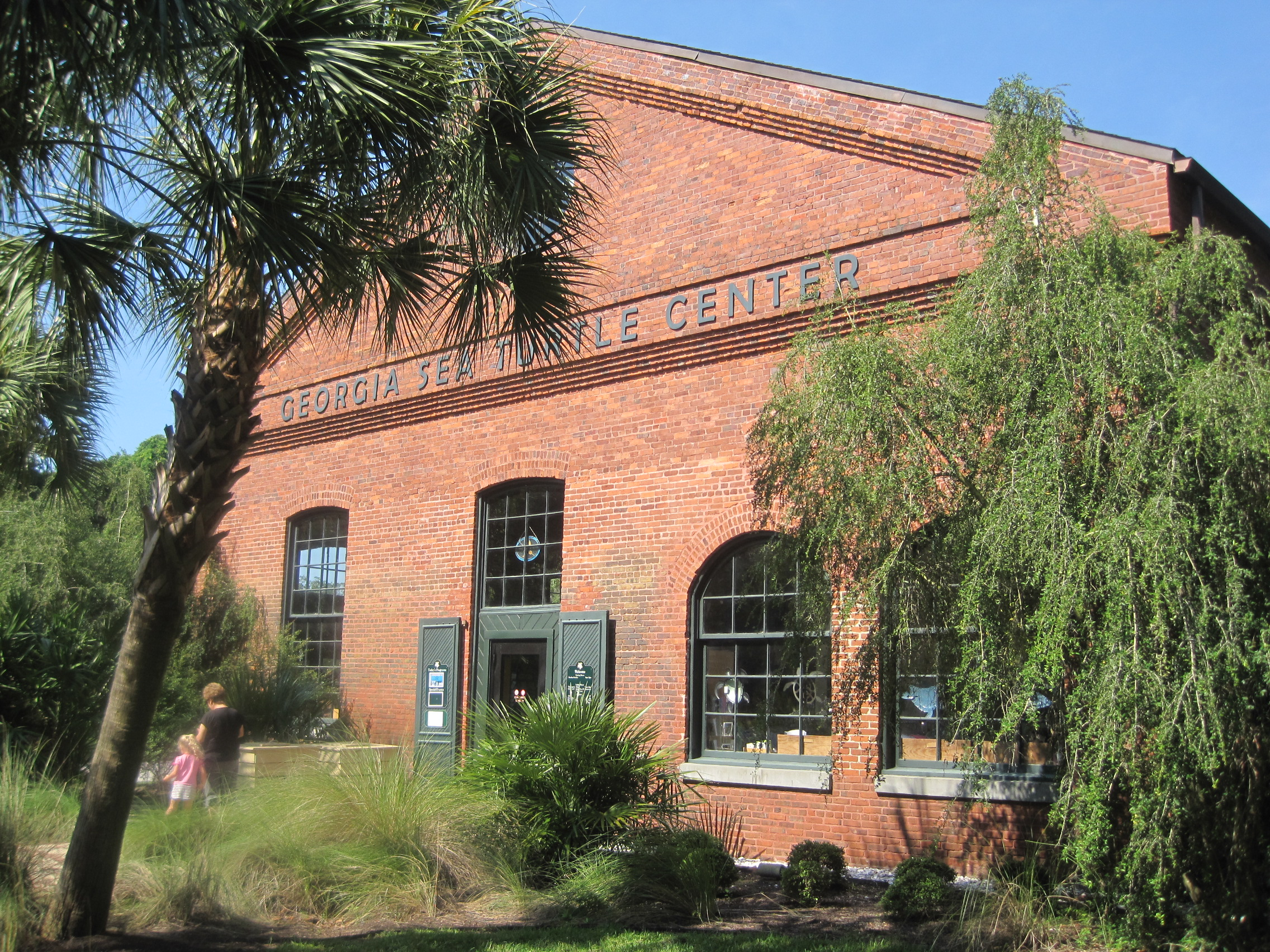
Georgia Sea Turtle Center, housed in the former Jekyll Island Club power plant

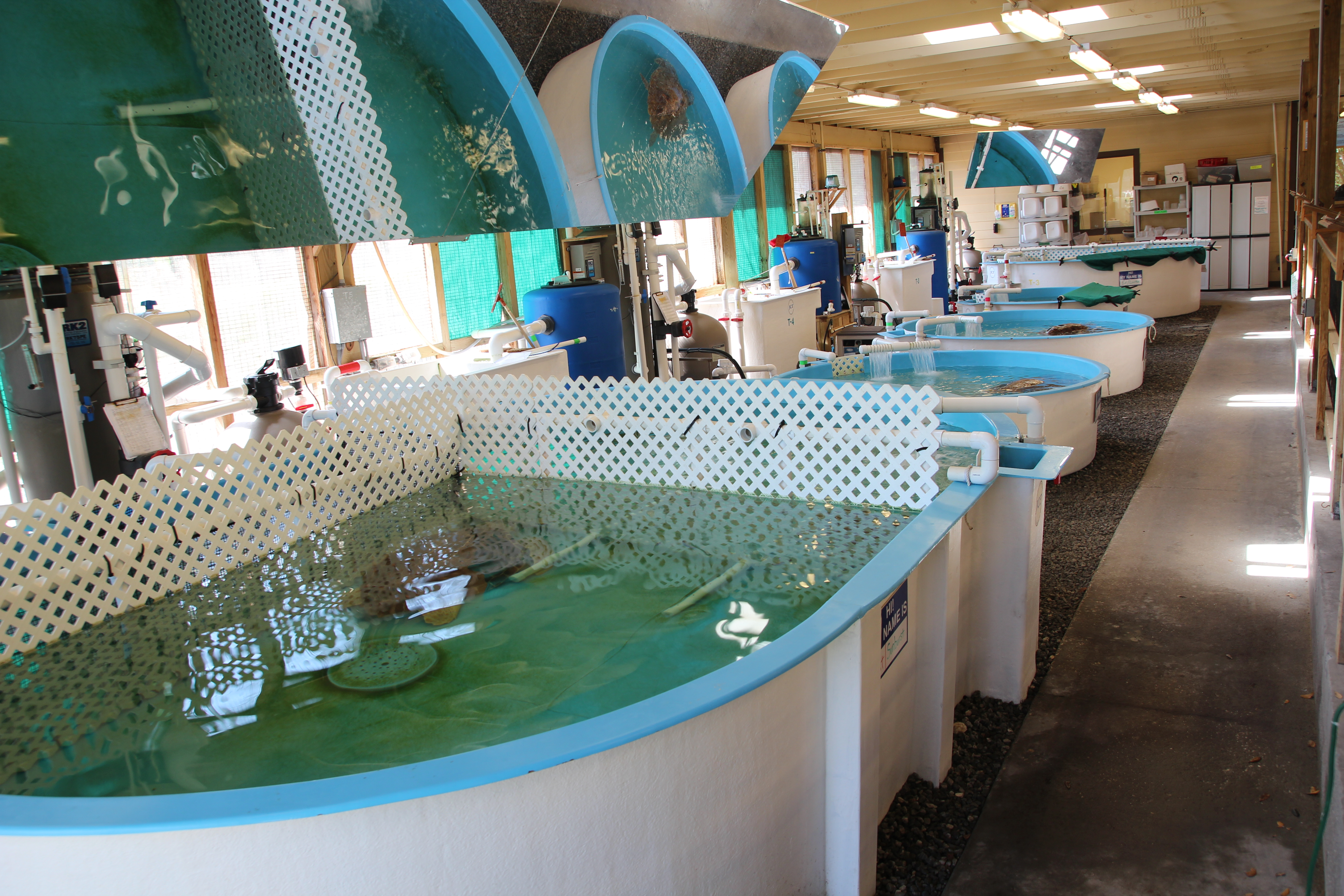

Georgia Sea Turtle Center is a nature center and rescue and rehabilitation facility for sea turtles on Jekyll Island, Georgia, United States, that was founded in 2007.

== Overview ==
The Center features interactive exhibits and patient viewing areas. In addition to caring for sick and injured turtles, the Center has an educational mission, and presents daily programs, field trips, guided tours and beach walks.

The Center is housed in the former Power Plant building of the Jekyll Island Club, at 214 Stable Road. It is a contributing structure in the Jekyll Island Historic District, and listed on the National Register of Historic Places.

== See also ==
- American Tortoise Rescue
- Threats to sea turtles
