= Faith Chapel (Jekyll Island, Georgia) =

- U.S. National Register of Historic Places
- U.S. Historic district
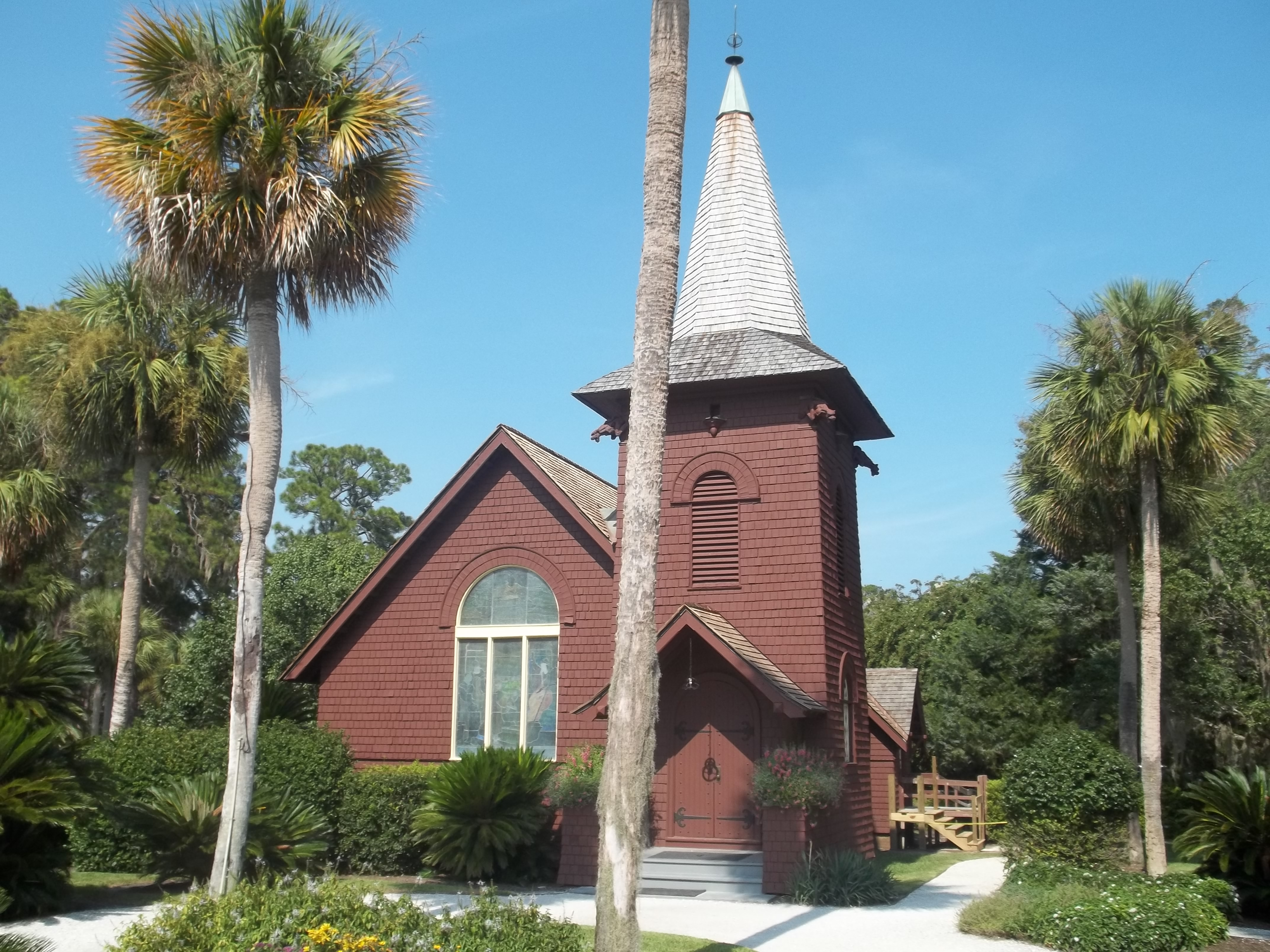

- Location within Georgia Location within the United States
- Location: 181 Old Plantation Rd., Jekyll Island, Georgia
- Coordinates: 31°3′38″N 81°25′18″W
- Area: 2.4 acres (0.97 ha)
- Built: 1904
- Architect: Howard Constable, Constable Brothers, NYC
- Architectural style: Shingle Style
- NRHP reference No.: 71000277
- Added to NRHP: July 14, 1971

Faith Chapel is a historic chapel on Old Plantation Road in Jekyll Island, Georgia and was built in 1904. It was used as a non-denominational chapel until 1942. The state of Georgia purchased it along with Jekyll Island in 1947. It is administered by the Jekyll Island State Park Authority and was opened to the public in 1970. It has a wood "A" frame and a brick foundation. The interior and exterior walls are shingled, with gargoyles that are replicas of the ones at Notre Dame Cathedral. The chapel was added to the National Register of Historic Places in 1971 and it is open to the public.

== Memorial windows ==
Faith Chapel has two memorial stained-glass windows. One is the Stickney Memorial Window in the sanctuary, dedicated in 1905, featuring "The Adoration of the Christ Child" made by Maitland Armstrong and his daughter, Helen Maitland Armstrong. The other is the Bourne Memorial Window at the back of the nave, dedicated on Easter Sunday 1921, featuring "David's Window", designed by Frederick Wilson, made and signed by Louis Comfort Tiffany.

== Gallery ==
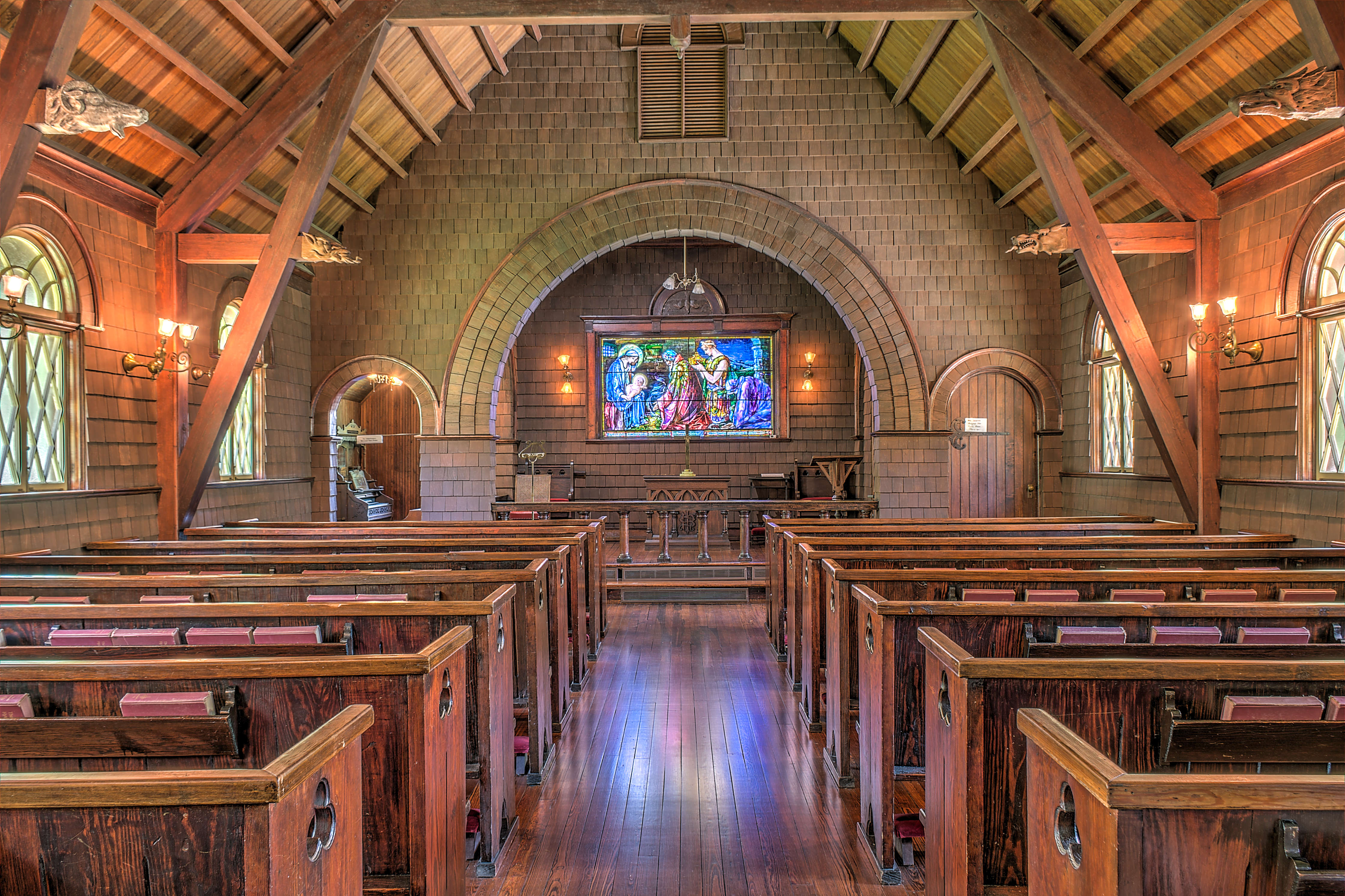
Faith Chapel: nave facing sanctuary

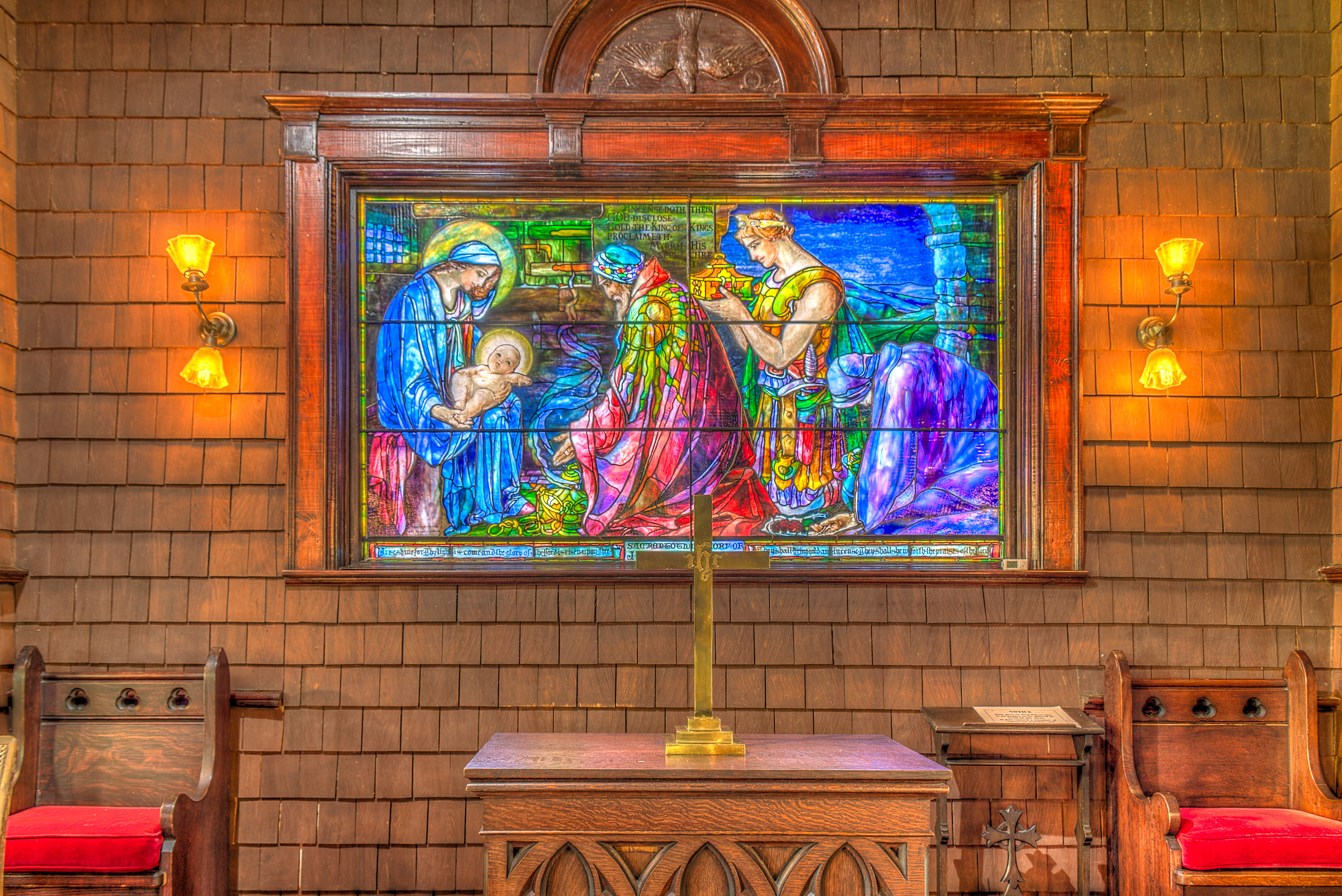
Stickney Memorial Window (1905) in sanctuary

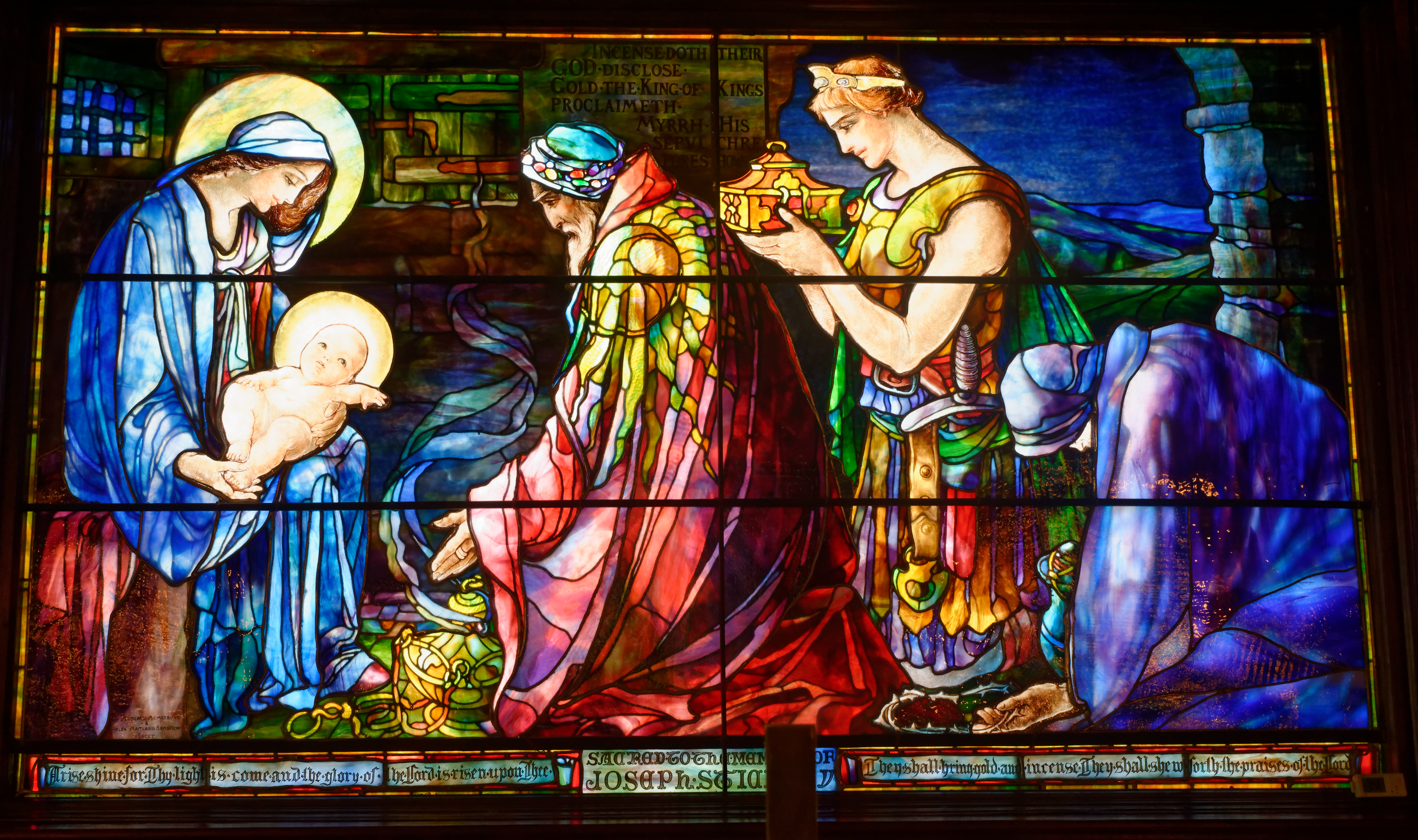
Armstrong "Adoration of the Christ Child by the Magi"

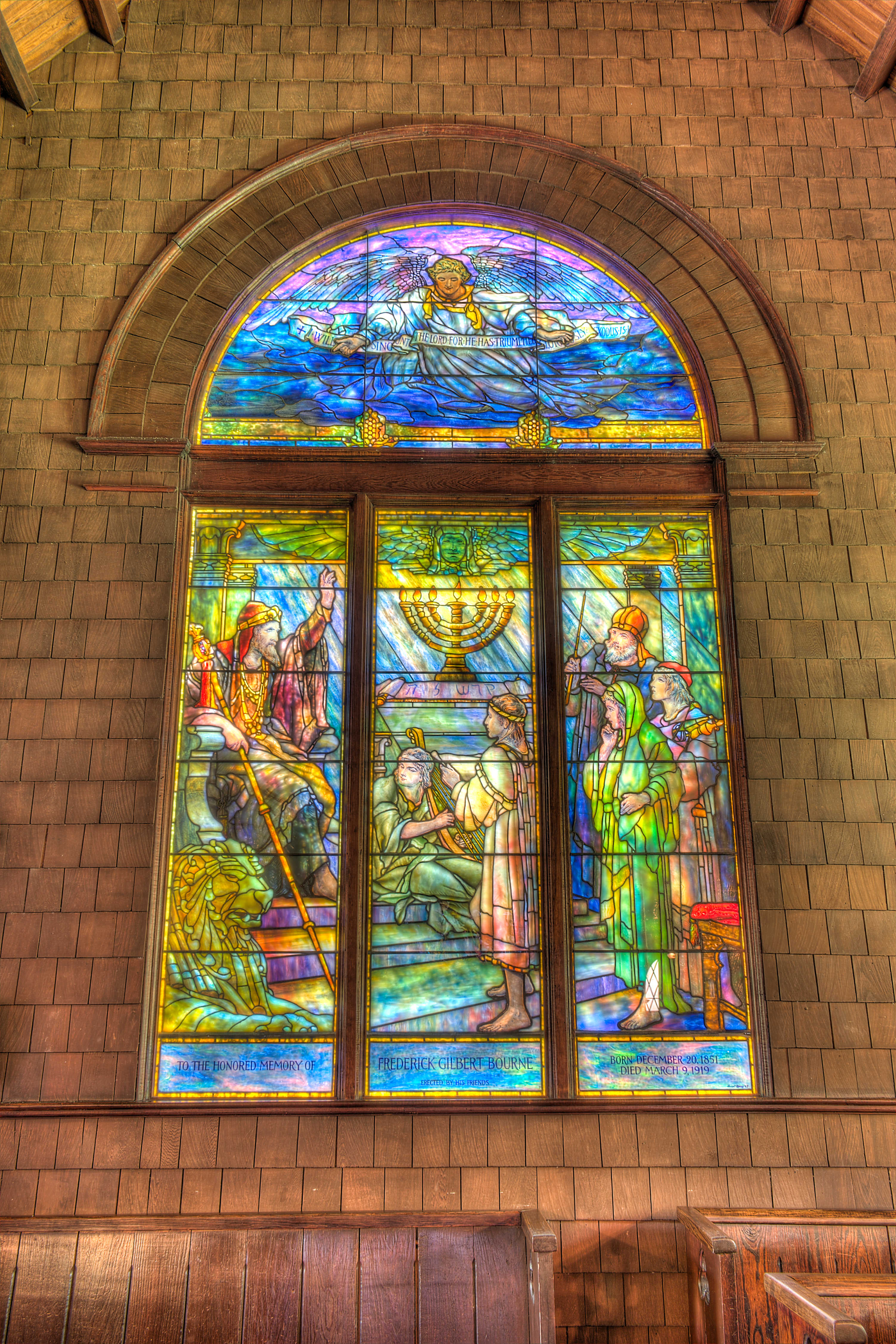
Bourne Memorial Window (1921) at back of nave

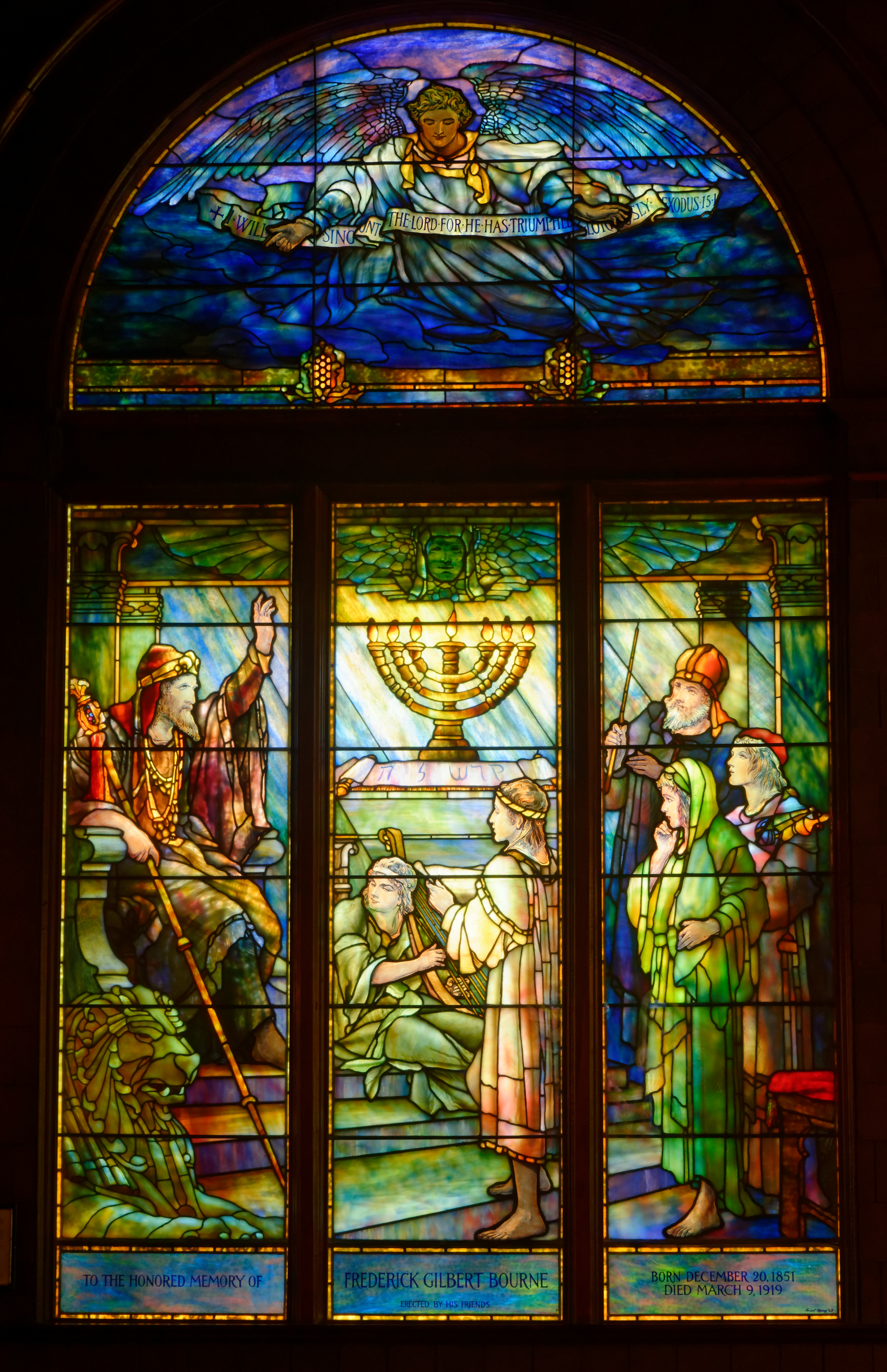
Tiffany "David Set Singers Before the Lord"

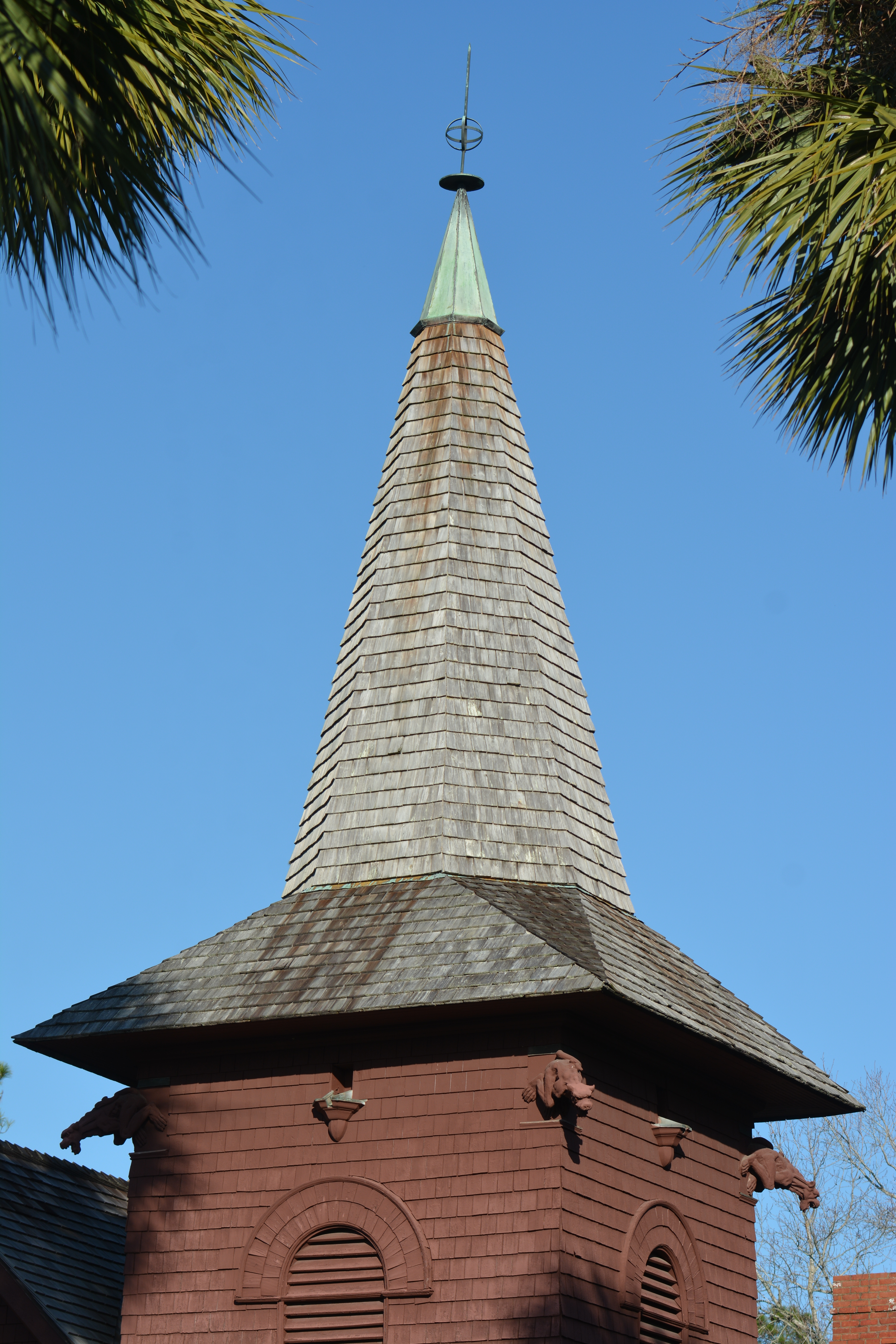
Steeple with gargoyles

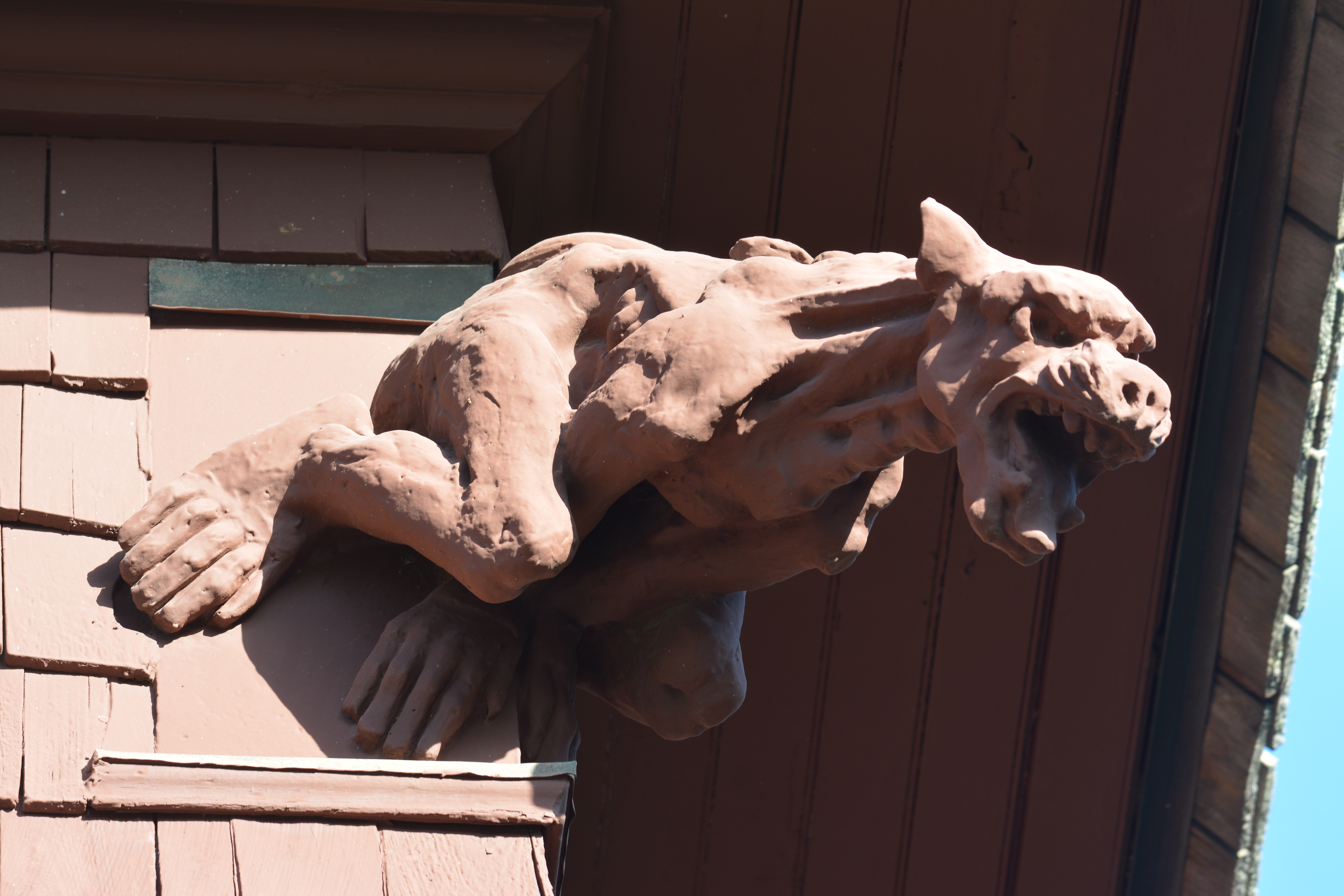
Gargoyle

== See also ==
- St. Peter's Chapel, Mare Island -- another Shingled Gothic-style chapel, designed by Albert Sutton
