= De Ruiter =

De Ruiter is a Dutch-language surname. In modern Dutch, ruiter indicates any equestrian. In the past, the name more specifically referred to a mounted soldier or knight. Variant spellings include De Rijter, De Ruijter, De Ruyter, Deruyter, and Ruiter.

De Ruiter

- Anne de Ruiter (born 1999), Dutch acing cyclist
- Frans de Ruiter (1946-2025), Dutch musicologist
- Freddy de Ruiter (born 1969), Norwegian politician
- Gerrit de Ruiter (1927-2010), Dutch field hockey player
- Job de Ruiter (1930–2015), Dutch politician
- John de Ruiter (born 1959), Canadian philosopher
- Jorrit de Ruiter (born 1986), Dutch badminton player
- Kelvin de Ruiter (born 1988), Dutch strongman
- Lo de Ruiter (1919–2008), Dutch politician
- Michiel de Ruiter (born 1964), Dutch freestyle skier
- Nellien de Ruiter (1926-2000), Dutch politician
- Niels de Ruiter (born 1983), Dutch darts player
- Nol de Ruiter (1940–2025), Dutch footballer and coach
- Piet de Ruiter (1939–2014), Dutch politician
- Robin de Ruiter (born 1951), Dutch author
- Roy de Ruiter (born 1981), Dutch military pilot
- Roy de Ruiter (born 1989), Dutch footballer
- Toon de Ruiter (1935-2001), Dutch rower
- Wesley de Ruiter (born 1986), Dutch footballer
- Wietske de Ruiter (born 1970), Dutch field hockey player

De Ruijter

- Bert de Ruijter (born 1952), Dutch blues musician
- Elise de Ruijter (born 1999), Dutch sailor
- Frits de Ruijter (1917–2012), Dutch middle-distance runner

De Ruyter

- Alain De Ruyter (born 1969), Belgian speed skater
- André de Ruyter (born 1968), South African businessman
- Engel de Ruyter (1649–1683), Dutch vice-admiral
- Kees de Ruyter (1925-1983), Dutch billiards player
- Kuuno de Ruyter, a video game character
- Michiel de Ruyter (1607–1676), Dutch admiral and naval hero
- Michiel de Ruyter (1926-1994), Dutch jazz radio presenter
- Stephnie de Ruyter, New Zealand politician
- Wim de Ruyter (1918–1995), Dutch racing cyclist

DeRuiter

- Geraldine DeRuiter, American author & blogger

Deruyter

- Charles Deruyter (1890–1955), Belgian racing cyclist
- James DeRuyter Blackwell (1828–1901), American author & poet
- Tim DeRuyter (born 1963), American football coach
- Yves Deruyter (born 1970), Belgian DJ

Ruiter

- Bert Ruiter (1946–2022), Dutch bass guitarist
- Carlos Ruiter (born 1943), Brazilian footballer
- Jan Ruiter (born 1946), Dutch football goalkeeper
- Kaiya Ruiter (born 2006), Canadian figure skater
- Marijke Ruiter (born 1954), Dutch Paralympic swimmer
- Robbin Ruiter (born 1987), Dutch football goalkeeper

Ruiters

- Dierick Ruiters (1575-1640), Dutch explorer

== See also ==
- 12150 De Ruyter, an asteroid
- HNLMS De Ruyter, Dutch warships named after Admiral Michiel de Ruyter
- DeRuyter
- Reiter
- Reuter, the German equivalent
