= 1804 Antigua–Charleston hurricane =

Hurricane in 1804

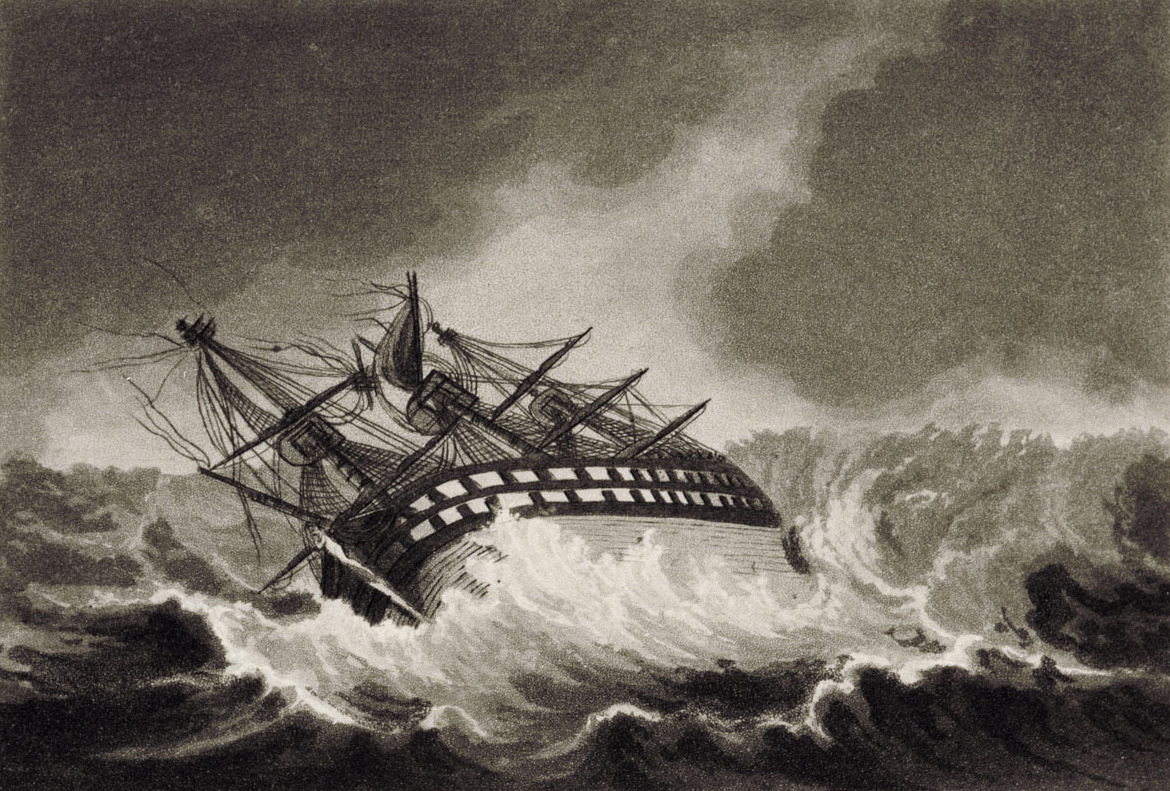
- Illustration of HMS Theseus caught in the hurricane off Hispaniola

Meteorological history
- Formed: September 3, 1804
- Dissipated: September 12, 1804

Overall effects
- Fatalities: More than 500 total
- Damage: $1.6 million (1804 USD)
- Areas affected: Caribbean Sea, Southeastern United States, New England
- Part of the 1804 Atlantic hurricane season

The 1804 Antigua–Charleston hurricane was the most severe hurricane in the American state of Georgia since 1752, causing over 500 deaths and at least $1.6 million (1804 USD) in damage throughout the Southeastern United States. (Note: All damage figures in the article are in 1804 United States dollars (USD) unless otherwise stated.) Originating near Antigua on 3 September, it initially drifted west-northwestward, soon nearing Puerto Rico. Throughout its existence in the Caribbean Sea, the hurricane damaged, destroyed, and capsized numerous ships, and at Saint Kitts, it was considered to be the worst since 1772. By 4 September, the storm arrived at the Bahamas and turned northward before approaching the coast of northern Florida on 6 September. The hurricane eventually came ashore along the coastline of Georgia and South Carolina while producing mostly southeasterly winds. A severe gale was noted in New England later that month, on 11 and 12 September, although it was likely not the same system as that which had passed through the Caribbean and southeastern United States earlier that month.

The hurricane produced a wide swath of damage along its path, especially in Georgia and South Carolina. Maritime losses along the coastlines of both states were significant, with numerous ships damaged or destroyed. Crop damage, especially to rice, cotton, and corn, was also considerable, with impending harvests ruined by the hurricane's arrival. Strong winds and heavy rainfall inundated streets, residences, and fields, and also toppled chimneys, fences, and cracked windows across the region. Wharves, struck by stranded boats, endured significant damage as well. Dozens of residences and other structures were destroyed or rendered uninhabitable due to inundation or collapse. Notably, Aaron Burr, then attempting to flee authorities, visited St. Simons Island in Georgia during the hurricane, later returning to Hampton and giving a detailed account of the hurricane's effects. Damage in Savannah, Georgia, totaled $500,000, compared to $1,000,000 at Charleston, South Carolina.

== Meteorological history ==
The 1804 Antigua–Charleston hurricane was first sighted on 3 September as it swept past Saint Barthélemy, Saint Kitts, and Antigua, drifting toward the west-northwest and soon approaching Puerto Rico and the Turks and Caicos Islands. The storm reached the Bahamas while turning northward on 4 September, nearing the northern Floridan coast by 6 September. It remained offshore on 7 September, gradually approaching the coast throughout the day, and eventually made landfall that evening along the coasts of Georgia and South Carolina. Observations in Savannah, Georgia, indicated north-to-northeast winds throughout 8 September, though other reports recorded northeast-to-easterly gusts; at Charleston, South Carolina, however, winds, initially northeast-to-east, curved southeastward later in the storm. Little information exists on the hurricane's whereabouts between North Carolina and New England, with a single report at Norfolk, Virginia of east-northeasterly winds veering east-to-east-southeast from 7 to 9 September, suggesting the disturbance's passage west of there. A severe gale arrived in New England on 11 and 12 September, though the long pause between the departure of the hurricane from the Carolinas and its arrival in the northeastern United States evidences the possibility that the two systems may have been unrelated.

== Impact ==
=== Georgia ===
The hurricane of 1804 was the first since 1752 to strike Georgia with such strength. Damage to ships was considerable, especially offshore Georgia. Betsy was stripped of its freight and somewhat damaged, Phoebe ran aground at Tybee Island, Liberty perished with its crew killed, Patsy nearly sank, and Experiment capsized. At the time the hurricane struck, Aaron Burr, hiding from federal officials, was taking refuge at St. Simons Island on the property of John Couper, though was unable to return to Hampton due to deteriorating conditions. Upon the passage of the storm's eye, Burr fled back to the residence of Pierce Butler at Hampton. In an account of the hurricane, Burr recorded strong winds, which destroyed several outhouses and uprooted numerous trees at St. Simon's, with the storm later cracking windows, toppling chimneys, and flooding the house; in the town proper, he discovered many local roads were obstructed. Nineteen slaves owned by Butler drowned, while Couper suffered $100,000 (1804 USD) in losses alone, with cabins housing over a hundred slaves destroyed. Many other local planters experienced similar difficulties. Seawater inundated and ruined several acres of cotton around the Horton House plantation at Jekyll Island, devaluing the year's harvest by 20 percent; similar losses were endured by other rice, cotton, and corn farmers along the coast.

At Broughton Island, orders were given to transfer slaves away from a rice barn upon indications of a storm's arrival; however, efforts to do so were not undertaken promptly, and more than seventy slaves drowned, leading the plantation owner to sell the property following financial losses. Similar events transpired at St. Catherines Island, where two slaves died. At Darien, meanwhile, a tannery was destroyed, and flood waters ruined its tanning baths. At Sunbury, intense winds and high waves uprooted trees and wrecked three houses, of which two were newly built, and five slaves died after being impaled by flying wreckage or drowning. The hurricane also ruined most boats under the possession of plantation owners, and also devastated crops, storage houses, stables, and slave residences. Meanwhile, at Cockspur Island, Fort Greene was obliterated with all its buildings destroyed and thirteen men killed. Muskets, canisters, bars of lead upward of 300 lb (140 kg), and cannons weighing 4,800 lb (2,200 kg) littered the island, which was completely inundated during the storm. The fort was never rebuilt; Fort Pulaski was later built in its former location. Meanwhile, at Wilmington Island, one house collapsed and swaths of farmland were flooded. North-to-northeast winds surrounded Hutchinson Island, producing tides 7 to 10 ft (2.1 to 3.0 m) above normal, submerging rice crops, sweeping away plantation buildings, and drowning nearly a hundred slaves.

The hurricane's effects were especially severe in the city of Savannah, where winds incessantly gusted northeast-to-north for 17 consecutive hours. The hurricane's storm surge overcame sand bars, sweeping into bays, rivers, wharves, and any areas below an elevation of 10 ft (3.0 m). Droplets of sea spray mixed with rain, apparently giving it a saline taste, while particles of sand were lifted from the shore to the upper floors of 30 ft (9.1 m)-tall houses. By the storm's peak, all vessels in the city harbor were damaged to some degree by the storm, while it also inflicted damage to nearly all residences in the city's southern sector. A gunboat was swept 7 mi (11 km) from its original position and landed in a faraway field. The steeple of the Presbyterian Meeting House in the city toppled and portions of a wall of the Christ Episcopal Church caved in. The local courthouse was also damaged, shingles were torn off of a jail roof, and a tobacco house was unroofed. Two children were crushed to death in one house, one individual was killed by a falling chimney at another. Maritime losses were observed throughout the city; Mary struck a wharf near Fort Wayne, Thomas Jefferson came aground at Hunter and Minis's Wharf, General Jackson slammed into McCradie's Wharf, Liberty capsized near Howard's Wharf, and Minevra was driven ashore at Coffee House Wharf. Numerous other wharves were damaged as a result of similar accidents, and at some wharves, vessels became stacked upon each other. Fish and poultry markets, as well as businesses along the wharves, disintegrated into the Savannah River. Timber, cotton, tobacco, liquor, sugar, and produce was also strewn along the bluff. Overall, eighteen vessels were capsized in Savannah throughout the course of the hurricane. Many smaller vessels were apparently "cracked like egg shells," floating in waters paralleling the bluff, which itself was strewn with "serpents, turtles, [and] marsh-birds". Damage in the city totaled at least $500,000 (1804 USD).

=== South Carolina ===
Tides in South Carolina rose 9 ft (2.7 m) above normal, causing the May River to top its banks, flooding cotton and rice fields, and sweeping plantations' cotton storage houses and slave cabins away. Inundation also occurred at various offshore locations, including Daufuskie Island, where five slaves drowned. Bridges and roadways at Beaufort, South Carolina were flooded and carried away by high tides, while high tides of up to 5 ft (1.5 m) flooded farmland, ruining fields of cotton and produce. Strong gusts knocked down chimneys and damaged the town's Baptist church. Cotton farmland and African slave prices fell 30 percent in the region following the storm's passage. All residences at Bay Point Island were destroyed, having been driven out to sea. The storm's salt water storm surge rendered thirty barrels of rice aboard Guilelmi, which ran ashore at Saint Helena Island, worthless, while Collector came aground at Lady's Island. Copious rainfall caused the Pocotaligo, Stony, and Huspa creeks to overflow. From Sheldon to Motley, the storm flooded creeks and rivers, inundating rice and cotton fields, with the saline water destroying the year's harvest. Roads and causeways inundated under flood waters were rendered unusable, and numerous animals were also killed in the flood.

The hurricane's effects were severe in the city of Charleston, where the storm produced northeasterly winds and heavy rainfall. The bulwark of the fort at nearby James Island was destroyed, and the palisades of the fort at Castle Pinckney were wrecked at the mouth of Charleston's harbor. The hurricane also swept vessels aground into marshes and wharves between Gadsden's Wharf and South Bay along the Cooper River. Several wharves—Pritchard's, Cochran's, Beale's, Craft's, and William's—were struck by vessels and consequently severely damaged. Montserrat, Mary, Birmingham Packet, Amazon, and Orange all endured some degree of damage. Three vessels and Mary collided with Governor's Bridge, which was impaired as a result; two vessels and Favorite slammed into Faber's Wharf, while Concord filled with water at Prioleau's Wharf, resulting in the loss of 50 tierces of rice. A counting and scale house was separated from its foundation after being struck by Lydia within the vicinity of Blake's Wharf, while the African slave boat Christopher capsized at Geyer's Wharf, with all aboard escaping safely. Four slaves drowned after a boat overturned in the Ashley River.

High waters enveloped wharves, and neighboring stores collapsed or were washed away, with rice and cotton falling into the water. A breakwater near South Bay disintegrated and a nearby home's chimney toppled, resulting in one death. Homes were inundated, and residents along South Bay consequently fled their dwellings. The hurricane's storm surge also permeated locations along then-new East Bay Street, as well as buildings on Lamboll and Water streets; Meeting Street sank below 2 ft (0.61 m)-high flood waters. High winds, meanwhile, tore off roofs, dislodged trees, and toppled fences. To the north of Charleston, at Sullivan's Island, the storm rendered 15 to 20 houses uninhabitable; although the island was mostly inundated, many residences were saved, encircled by dunes, and several men rescued women and children. Overall, only one death was recorded on the island. The Pee Dee and Black rivers gradually rose throughout the day, eventually spilling their banks. Meanwhile, at Georgetown, high tides flooded wharves and submerged streets and businesses, destroying corn, salt, and other goods. Turtles and fish were killed, and at the Sampit River, two individuals drowned attempting to cross. A rice harvest equivalent to ten thousand barrels was ruined by high tides and torrential rain within the vicinity of Georgetown. Damage in the city reached $1,000,000 (1804 USD), and overall, the 1804 hurricane was responsible for more than 500 deaths in the southeastern United States.

=== Elsewhere ===
At Saint Kitts, the hurricane destroyed approximately one hundred ships in the local harbor—all that were stationed there—while heavy rainfall drove houses to sea. An additional 56 of the 58 boats at Saint Barthélemy were lost, 58 were wrecked at Antigua, and 26 of 28 were ruined at Dominica. Damage to shipping was also severe on the Windward Islands, several vessels were lost in western Puerto Rico, and another 44 vessels were destroyed at Saint Thomas after the storm's passage. Among these vessels included a 64-gun storeship HMS De Ruyter was washed ashore and broke apart, resulting in one death, and HMS Drake, a 16-gun sloop-of-war, which came aground on a shoal off of Nevis. At Saint Kitts, the hurricane was considered to be the worst since 1772.

Although high waves and severe northeasterly gusts were noted from 6 to 7 September 1804 at St. Augustine, Florida and eight of the nine vessels in the local port were rendered unfit for use, the town proper largely escaped damage.

In North Carolina, the hurricane blew down trees as far as 100 mi (160 km) inland, and copious rainfall isolated Scotland Neck. Around the mouth of the Cape Fear River, the vessel Wilmington Packet ran aground at Bald Point.

In the New England gale possibly related to the Antigua–Charleston hurricane, several ships sank in Boston's harbor, while at Salem, the South Church's steeple was toppled.

== See also ==
- 1804 Atlantic hurricane season
- 1804 Snow hurricane
- List of Florida hurricanes (pre-1900)
- List of New England hurricanes

== Notes ==
=== References ===
- Fraser Walter J., Jr. (2009). Lowcountry Hurricanes. Athens, Georgia: University of Georgia Press. ISBN 978-0-8203-2866-9.
- Grocott, Terence (1998). Shipwrecks of the Revolutionary and Napoleonic Eras. Mechanicsburg, Pennsylvania: Stackpole Books. ISBN 1-84067-164-5.
- Ludlum, David McWilliams (1963). Early American hurricanes, 1492–1870. Boston, Massachusetts: American Meteorological Society. ISBN 0-933876-16-5.
