= Katrina Von Sass =

Canadian volleyball player (born 1972)

Katrina Von Sass (born January 25, 1972) is a Canadian former volleyball player.

== Career ==
Von Sass represented Canada at the 1996 Summer Olympics.

== Personal life ==
Von Sass and her sister Betina were in a relationship with the spiritual teacher John de Ruiter. They later sued him for financial support.
