= Ruyter =

Ruyter, DeRuyter and De Ruyter may refer to:

== Places ==
- DeRuyter (village), New York
- DeRuyter (town), New York
  - DeRuyter Central School in DeRuyter town
- DeRuyter Reservoir

== Given name ==
- Ruyter Suys (born 1968), lead guitar player of the band Nashville Pussy

== Surname ==
- Engel de Ruyter (1649–1683), Dutch vice admiral
- Maika Ruyter-Hooley (born 1987), Australian football player
- Michiel de Ruyter (1607–1676), Dutch Admiral
  - HNLMS De Ruyter, several ships named after the Dutch Admiral
  - De Ruyter Medal, awarded to members of the Dutch Merchant fleet
  - Michiel de Ruyter, a 2015 Dutch film
- Stephnie de Ruyter, leader of the New Zealand Democratic Party
- Tim DeRuyter (born 1963), American football coach
- Yves Deruyter (b. 1970), Belgian DJ and artist
