= Horton House =

Historic site in Glynn County, Georgia, US

- Horton-duBignon House, Brewery Ruins, duBignon Cemetery
- U.S. National Register of Historic Places
- U.S. Historic district
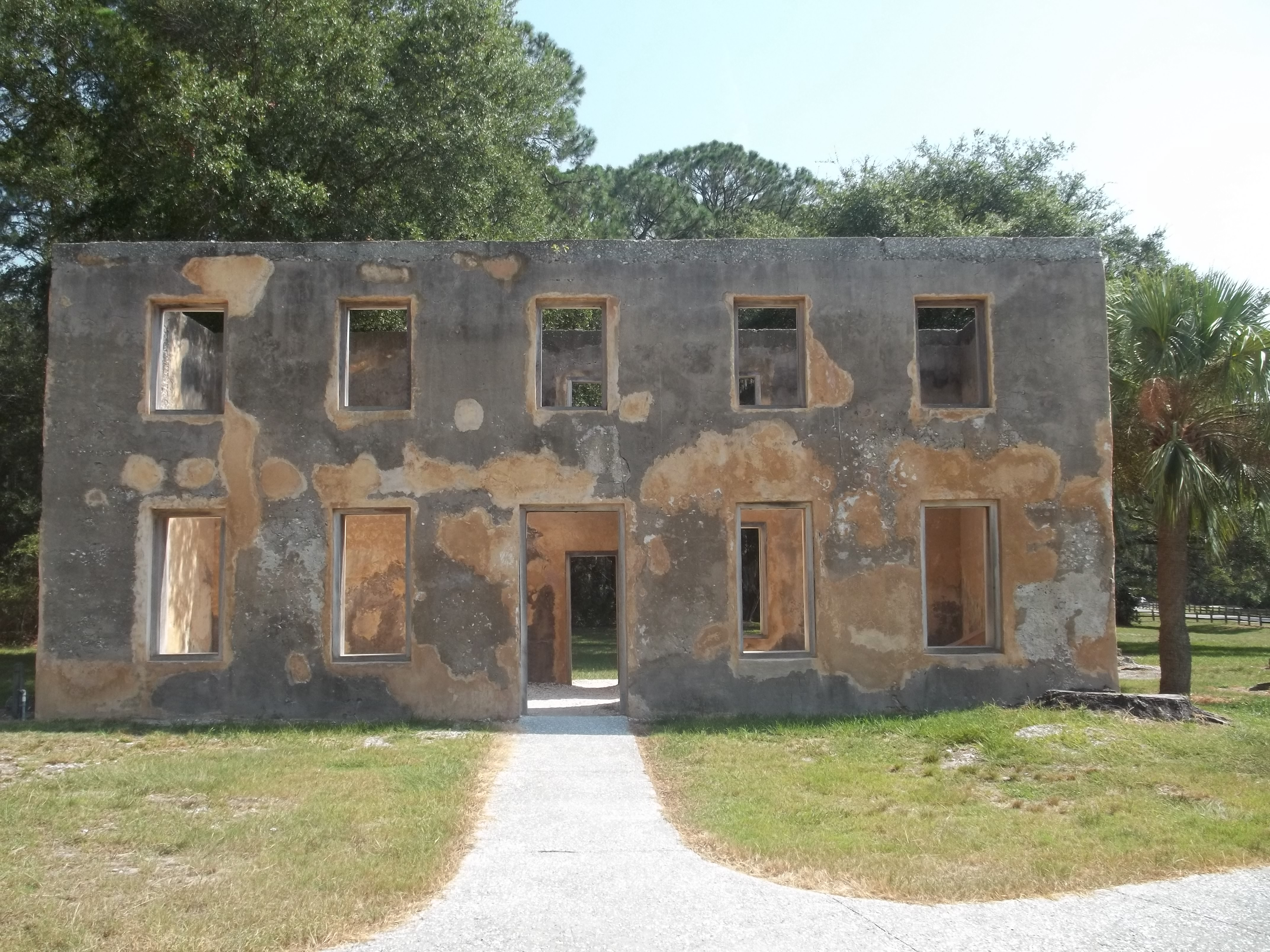

- Location within Georgia Location within the United States
- Location: Riverview Dr., Jekyll Island, Georgia
- Coordinates: 31.10177°N 81.41456°W
- Area: 9.9 acres (4.0 ha)
- Built: 1743
- Built by: Maj. William Horton
- NRHP reference No.: 71000278
- Added to NRHP: September 28, 1971

Horton House (also known as Horton-duBignon House, Brewery Ruins, duBignon Cemetery) is a historic site on Riverview Drive in Jekyll Island, Georgia.

The tabby house was originally constructed in 1743 by Major William Horton, a top military aide to General James Oglethorpe. Horton also brewed beer in Georgia's first brewery (the ruins of which are a few hundred yards down the road). This structure has been meticulously preserved over the past 100 years as an example of coastal Georgia building techniques and as one of the oldest surviving buildings in the state.

Across the street from the Horton House ruins is the du Bignon cemetery, a tabby wall surrounding the graves of five people: Ann Amelia du Bignon, Joseph du Bignon, Marie Felicite Riffault, Hector deLiyannis, and George Harvey. Horton House, the Brewery Ruins, and the cemetery were added to the National Register of Historic Places in 1971.

== Gallery ==
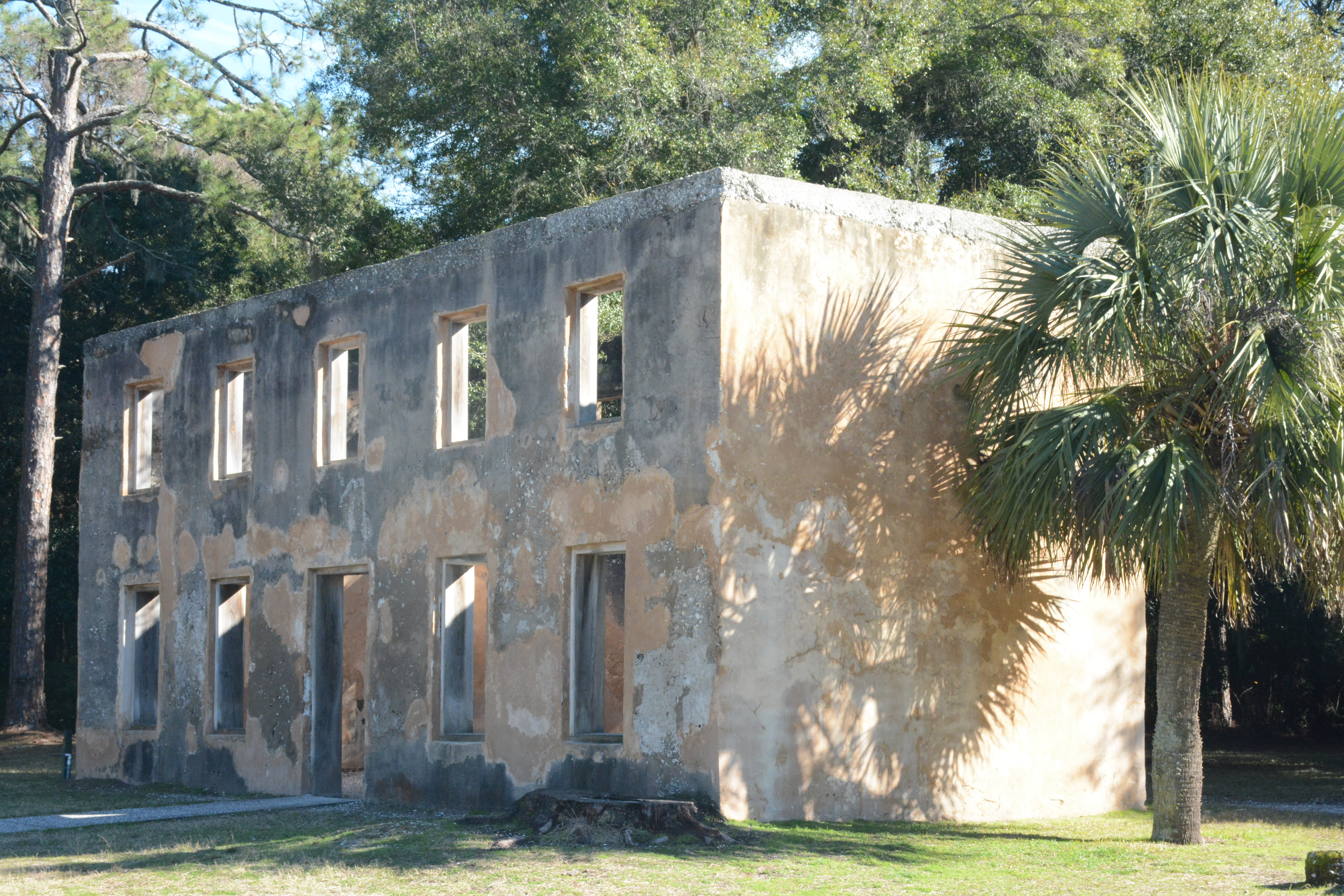
Outside

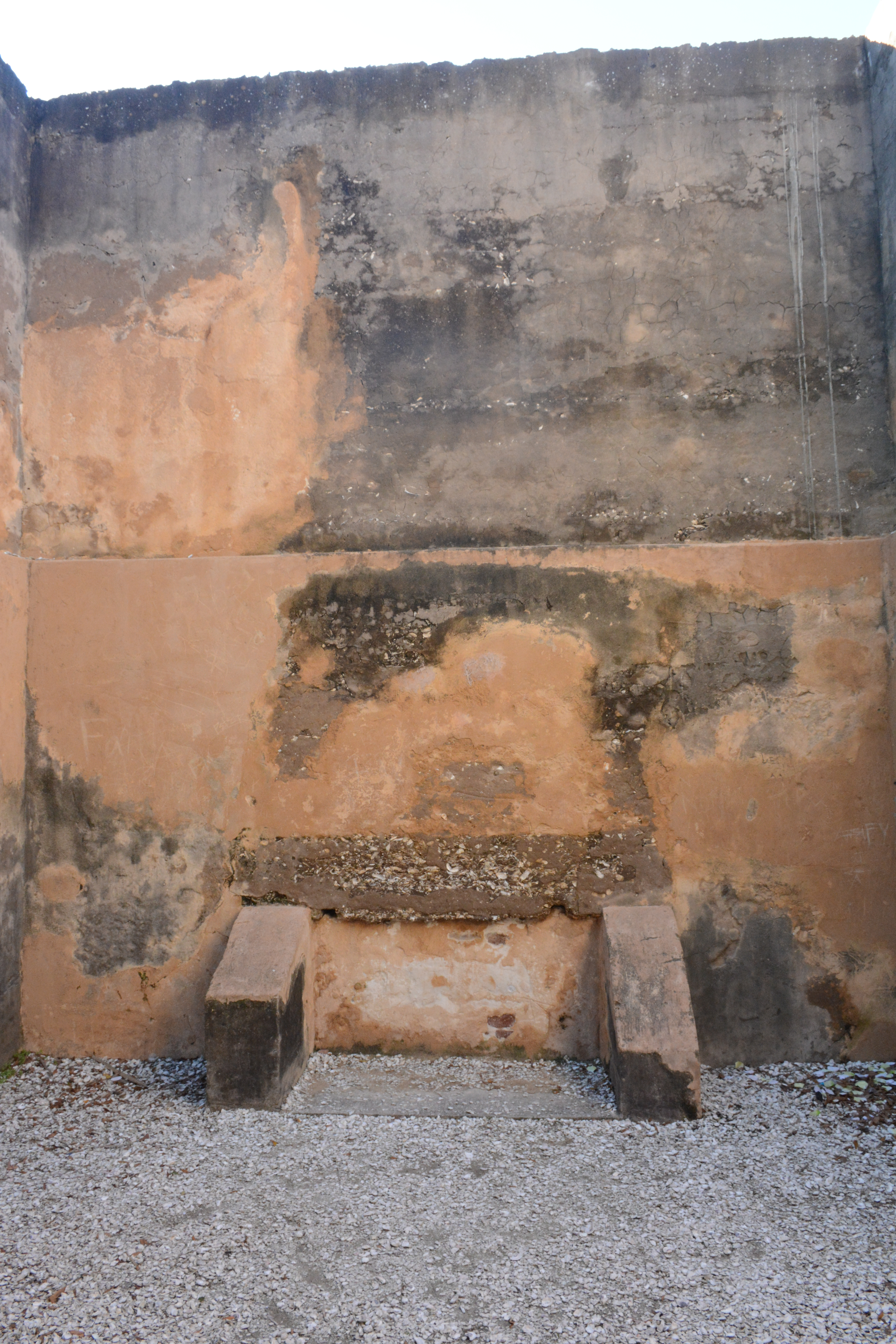
Inside wall

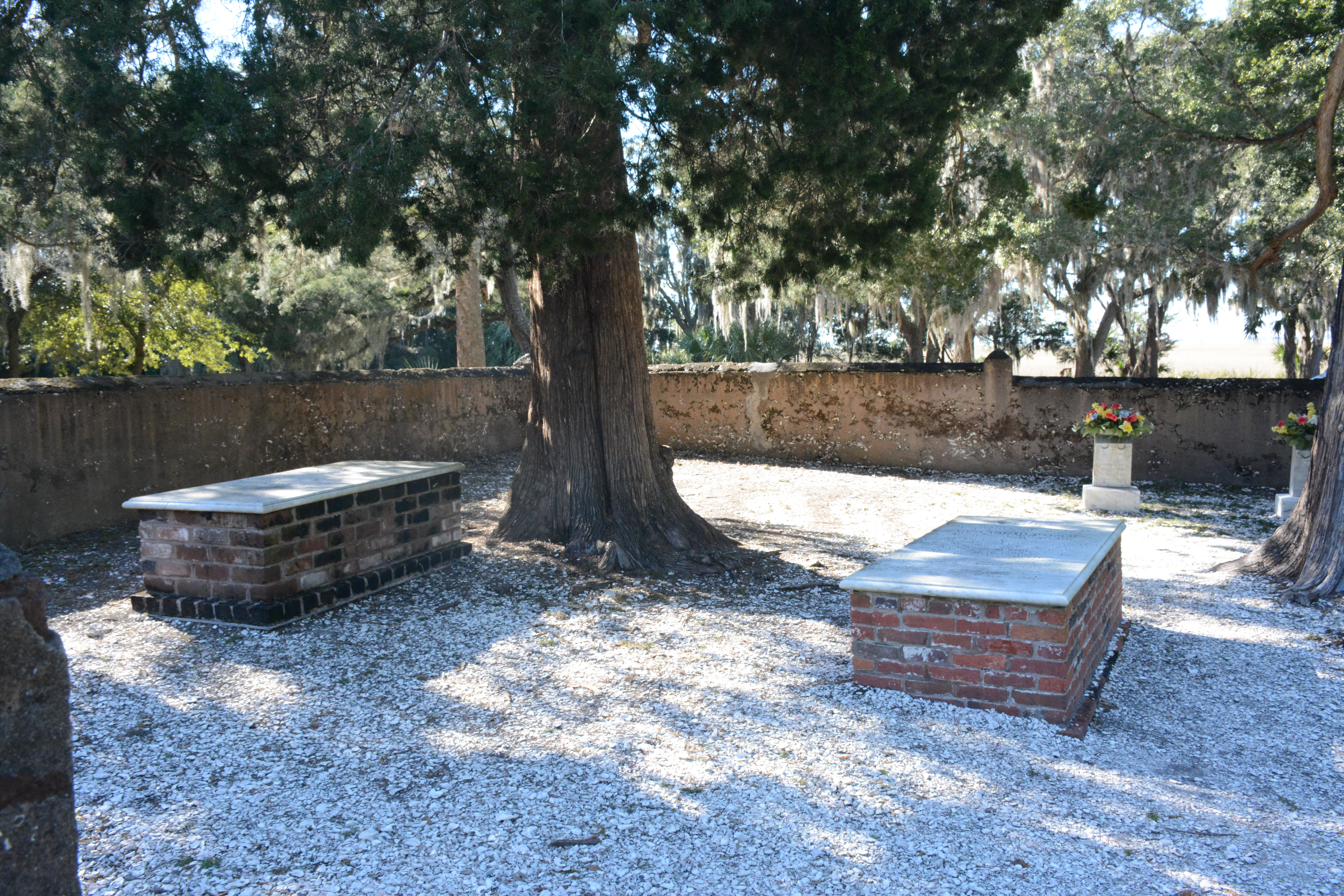
The duBignon Cemetery across from the house

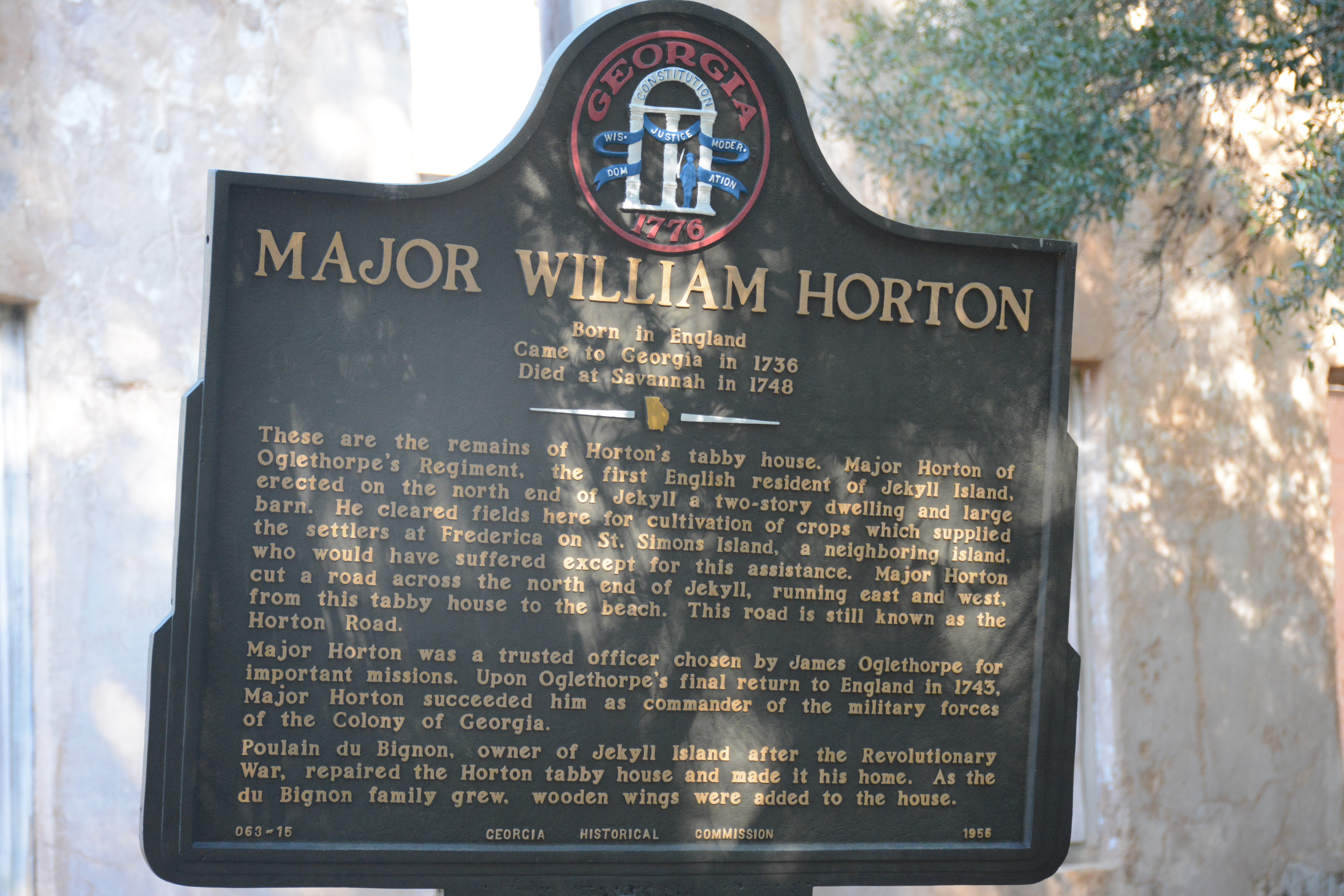
Historical marker for Maj. Horton

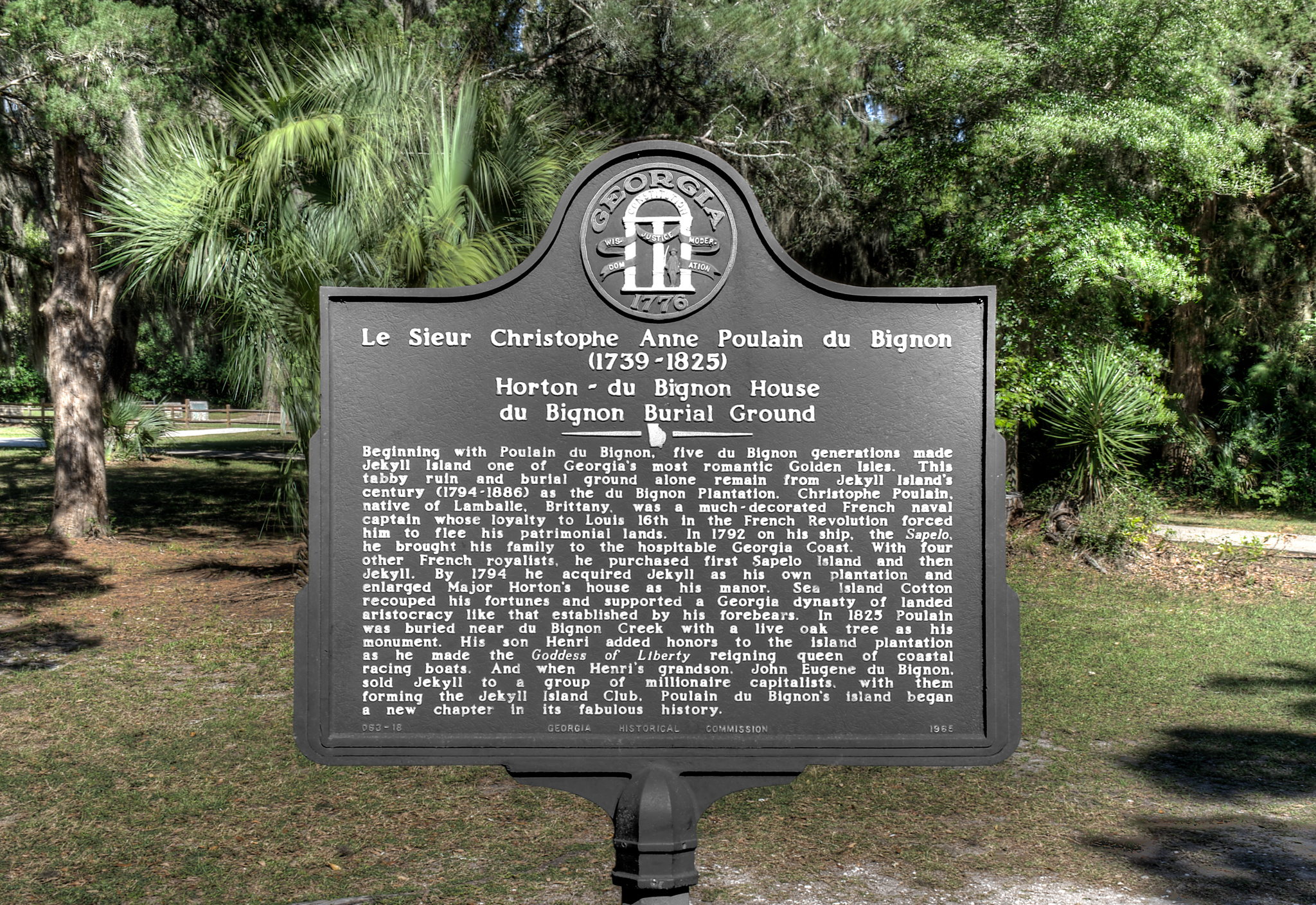
Historical marker for Cemetery

== See also ==
- List of the oldest buildings in Georgia
