= William Horton (military aide) =

- Born: c. 1708; Herefordshire, England
- Died: 1749; Savannah, Georgia

William Horton (c. 1708–1749) was the leading military aide to James Oglethorpe, a landowner and builder of the historic Horton House.

== Education ==
Horton was educated at John Roysse's Free School in Abingdon, (now Abingdon School).

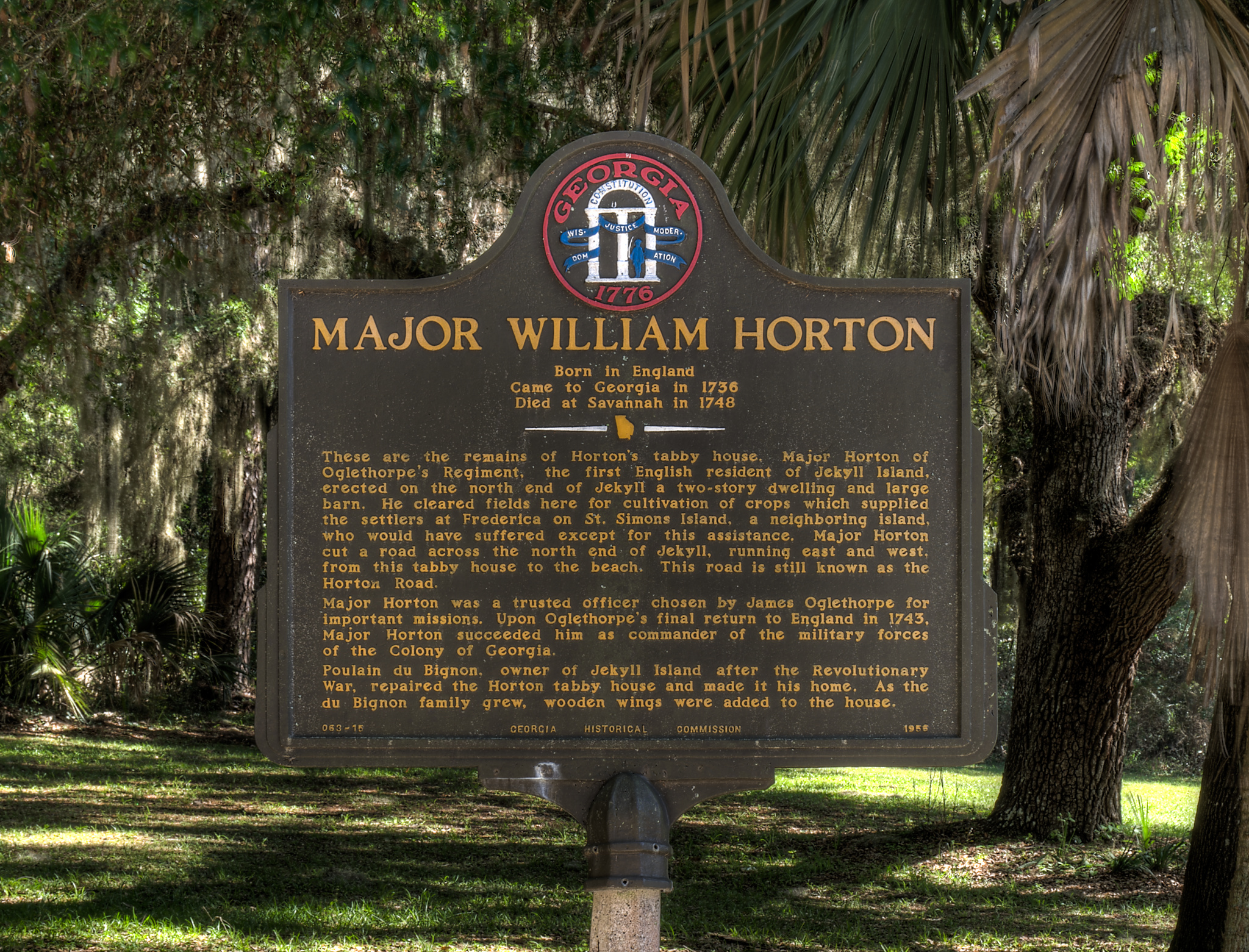
Historic marker for Horton on Jekyll Island

== Career ==
He was the leading military aide to General James Oglethorpe and was in charge of troops garrisoned at Fort Frederica on nearby St. Simons Island. Captain (1740), Major (1742). In 1735, Horton was granted Jekyll Island by the trustees of the colony of Georgia and also brewed beer in Georgia's first brewery on his plantation. He built Horton House in 1743, a historic site on Riverview Drive in Jekyll Island, Georgia. It is one of the oldest tabby buildings in Georgia, and is listed on the National Register of Historic Places.

== See also ==
- List of Old Abingdonians
