= Summer Waves =

Water park in Jekyll Island, Georgia, USA

- Interactive map of Summer Waves
- Location: Jekyll Island, Georgia, U.S.
- Coordinates: 31°2′15″N 81°25′16″W.
- Operating season: Summer
- Area: 11 acres (45,000 m^{2})

Attractions
- Water rides: 11
- Website: www.summerwaves.com

Summer Waves is a water park located on Jekyll Island, near the port city of Brunswick, Georgia. The park is open from mid-May through Labor Day (weekends-only after August 1st).

== Attractions ==
Ride	Description	Height Limit	Notes
Frantic Atlantic Wave Pool	A family-friendly wave pool containing over half a million gallons of water.	None	Waves turn on & off every 15 minutes.
Splash Zone	A small-kids playground featuring fountains and dump buckets.	None	
Turtle Creek	Quarter-mile lazy river that meanders around the park at a pace of 3 mph (4.8 km/h).	None	
Hurricane	A blue curving body slide that sends you downward for 330 feet (100 m).	42"	Part of the "Nature's Revenge" duo.
Tornado	A red curving body slide that sends you downward for 330 feet (100 m).	42"	Part of the "Nature's Revenge" duo.
Sharktooth Cove	A small-kids area with over 8 slides and interactive entryways.	None	
Thunder	A body slide that sends you spiraling down 150 ft (46 m). It is the first of the Force 3 group.	42"	
Lightning	A body slide that sends you down a steep 32 ft (9.8 m) drop. It is the second of the Force 3 group.	48"	
Flash Flood	A tube slide with slow, winding curves. It is the last of the Force 3 group.	None	The only slide outside of Sharktooth Cove that children shorter than 42" tall can ride.
Man o' War	A collection of four slides. Two of these slides are tubes-only, whereas the other two are body slides.	48"	The parks second-newest attraction, opened to the public in 2022.
Rattlesnake Racer	A 4-lane mat racing slide.	42"	The parks newest attraction, opened to the public in 2026.
