= James DeRuyter Blackwell =

American poet

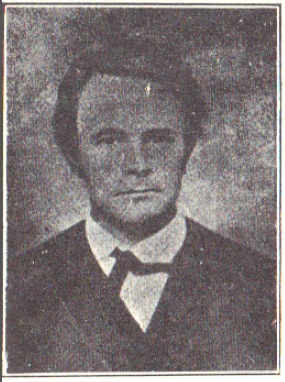
- Born: March 18, 1828; Warrenton, Virginia, U.S.
- Died: September 5, 1901 (aged 73)
- Education: Randolph–Macon College; Dickenson College
- Occupation: Poet
- Writing career
- Genre: Poetry

James DeRuyter Blackwell (18 March 1828 – 5 September 1901) of Warrenton, Virginia is a celebrated author and poet of the American Civil War era. He attended Randolph-Macon College and graduated from Dickinson College. He studied and practiced law before serving in the Army of the Confederacy and was honorably discharged in 1864. He gave up law for health reasons and devoted his life to literature. His experiences from the Civil War can be seen in much of his work as published in his "The Poetical Works of J. Der. Blackwell, 1879, E. J. Hale and Son, New York" which has been in print for over 130 years. It contains such poems as "The Dead Drummer Boy", "The Unknown Grave" and "Forget Not the Dead". The poem "War" specifically mentions the battles along the Rappahannock River in Virginia, considered the eastern boundary between the Union and Confederate States of America. In "War", he describes the bloody battles and the internal conflicts associated with glory and death. Blackwell is often read or quoted in Memorial and Veterans Day observances.
