= Anne de Ruiter =

Dutch cyclist (born 1999)

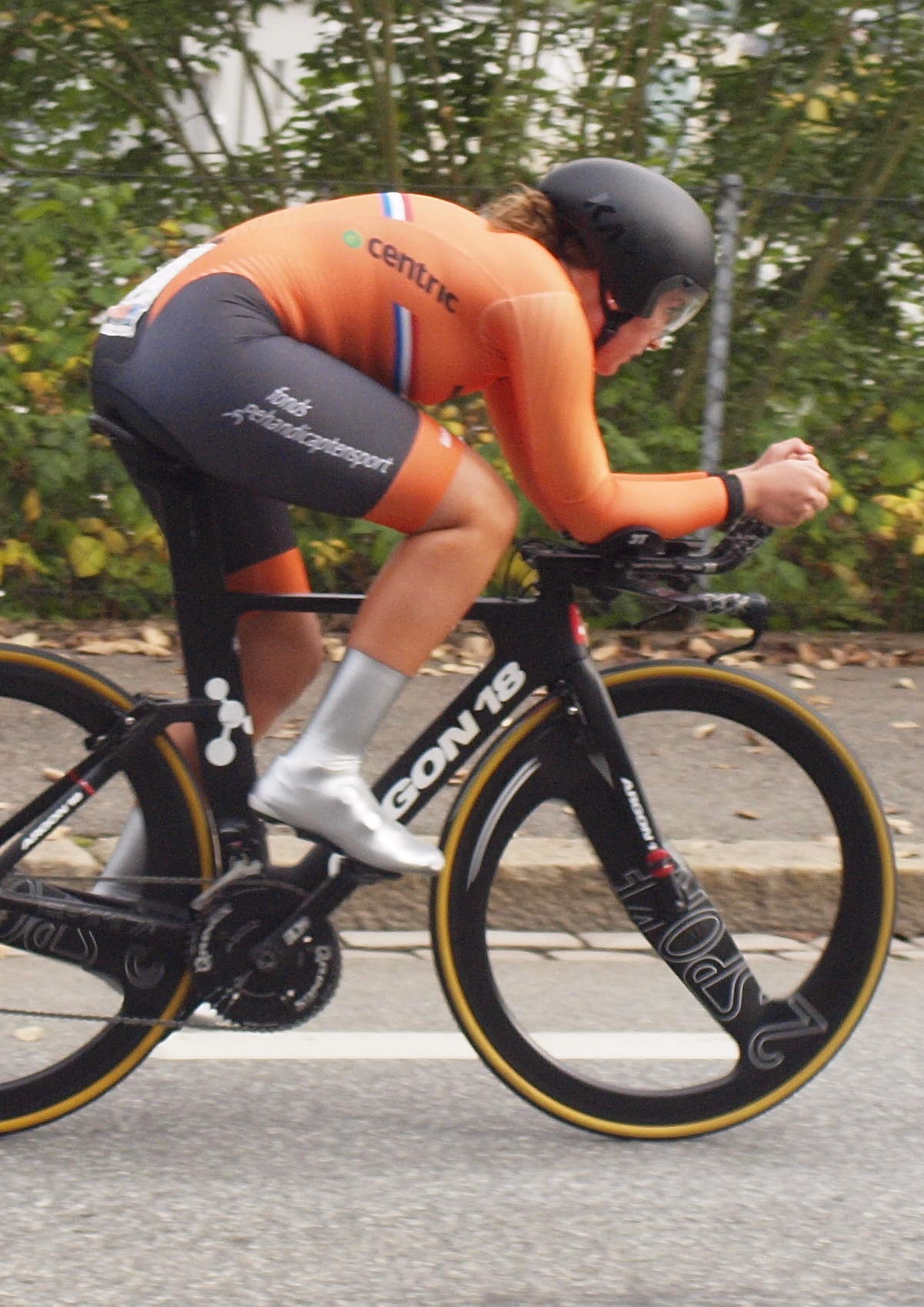
- De Ruiter in 2017

Personal information
- Full name: Anne de Ruiter
- Born: 30 November 1999 (age 26)

Cycling career
- Sport: Cycling
- Discipline: Road
- Role: Rider

Professional team
- 2018–2019: Parkhotel Valkenburg

Anne de Ruiter (born 30 November 1999) is a Dutch professional racing cyclist. She signed to ride for the UCI Women's Team Parkhotel Valkenburg for the 2019 women's road cycling season, but ultimately did not ride in any races for the team, and left the team.
