= Lo de Ruiter =

Dutch politician

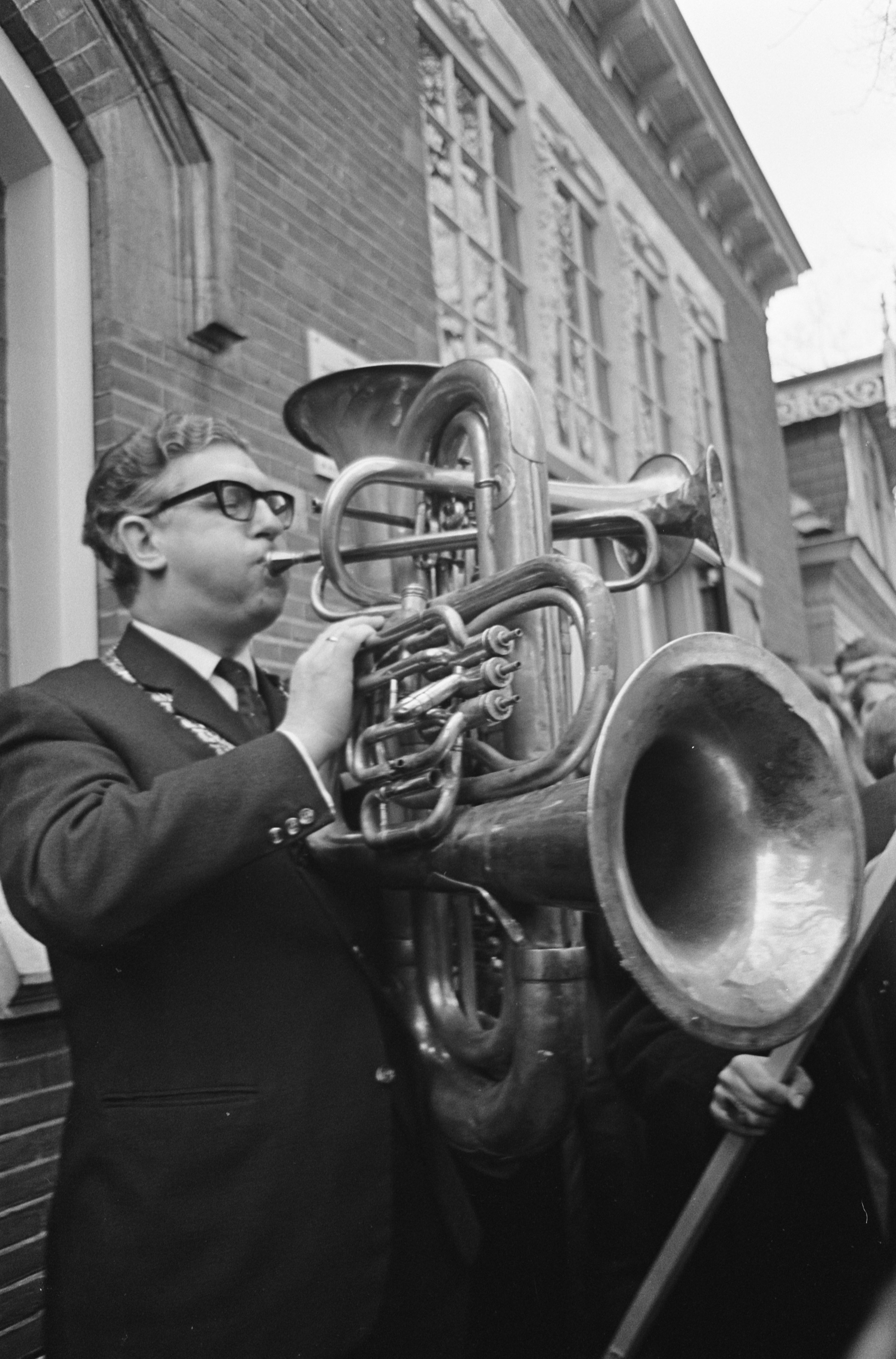
de Ruiter (1967)

Lodewijk Johannis (Lo) de Ruiter (12 June 1919 in Zwolle, the Netherlands – 18 May 2008 in Bergen, North Holland) was a mayor of Bergen and a dijkgraaf.
