= HNLMS De Ruyter =

HNLMS De Ruyter (Dutch: Hr.Ms. or Zr.Ms. De Ruyter) may refer to one of nine ships of the Dutch States Navy or Royal Netherlands Navy named after Admiral Michiel de Ruyter (1607–1676):

- Admiraal de Ruijter, a 68-gun Batavian ship of the line that the British navy captured in the 1799 Vlieter incident and took into service as the 64-gun storeship HMS De Ruyter. She was on her way to Falmouth, Jamaica to serve as a prison hulk in September 1804 when the Antigua–Charleston hurricane caused her to be washed ashore and wrecked with the loss of one sailor.
- HNLMS De Ruyter (1853), a 54-gun frigate converted to steam power and then into a broadside ironclad in 1863
- HNLMS De Ruyter (1880), an Atjeh-class unprotected cruiser
- HNLMS De Ruyter (1901), a Koningin Regentes-class coastal defense ship
- HNLMS De Ruyter (1926), an Admiralen-class destroyer. She was renamed Van Ghent to make way for the 1935 De Ruyter. She served in World War II and was wrecked on Bamidjo reef on 15 February 1942
- HNLMS De Ruyter (1935), a unique light cruiser. She served in World War II and was sunk in the battle of the Java Sea on 28 February 1942.
- HNLMS De Ruyter (C801), was a De Zeven Provinciën-class cruiser (laid down as De Zeven Provinciën, renamed after the sinking of the 1935 De Ruyter) launched in 1944. She was sold to Peru in 1973 and renamed Almirante Grau
- HNLMS De Ruyter (F806), a Tromp-class guided missile frigate
- HNLMS De Ruyter (F804), a De Zeven Provinciën-class frigate launched in 2002
