= Jekyll Island =

Barrier island located in Georgia, United States

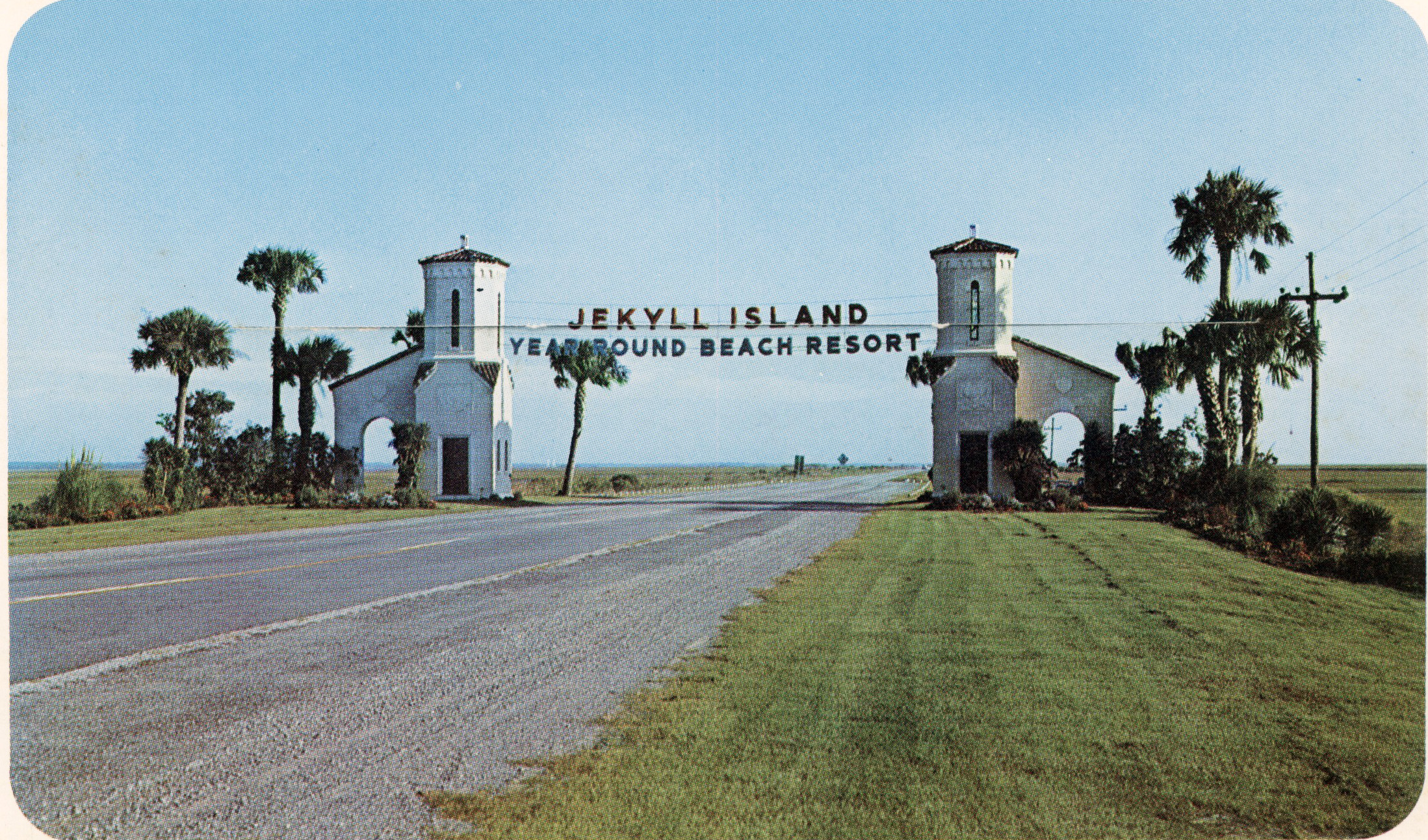
- The original entrance to the state park

- Location within Georgia Location within the United States
- Interactive map of Jekyll Island
- Location: Glynn County, Georgia, U.S.
- Nearest city: Brunswick, Georgia
- Coordinates: 31°4′12″N 81°25′13″W
- Established: October 7, 1947
- Governing body: Jekyll Island Authority

Jekyll Island is an island located in Glynn County, Georgia, United States. It is one of the Sea Islands and one of the Golden Isles of Georgia barrier islands. The island is owned by the State of Georgia and run by a self-sustaining, self-governing body.

It was long used seasonally by indigenous peoples of the region. The Guale and the Mocama, the indigenous peoples of the area when Europeans first reached the area, were killed or forced to leave by the English of the Province of Carolina and their native allies, and by raids by French pirates. Plantations were developed on the island during the British colonial period. A few structures still standing are made of tabby, a coastal building material using crushed oyster shells.

The island was developed in the late 19th and early 20th centuries. In November 1910, leading members of the American financial sector, including Paul Warburg and members of J.P. Morgan, met on the island in secret to draft legislation for a central bank which would later influence the Federal Reserve Act. The island was evacuated during World War II by order of the US government. In 1947 the state of Georgia acquired all the property, for security and preservation.

A popular tourist destination, the island has beaches frequented by vacationers. Guided tours of the Landmark Historic District are available. Bike trails, walks along the beaches and sandbars, and Summer Waves, a water park, are among the active attractions. The historic district features numerous buildings from the late nineteenth and early twentieth centuries. The island is also full of wildlife, consisting of many different mammals, reptiles, and birds living and breeding in the island's inland salt marshes. In 2018, Architectural Digest named Jekyll Island one of the 50 most beautiful small towns in America.

The island was listed as a census-designated place prior to the 2020 census with a population of 866. Jekyll Island is considered the eastern terminus of the South Georgia Parkway (SR 520).

== Physical setting ==
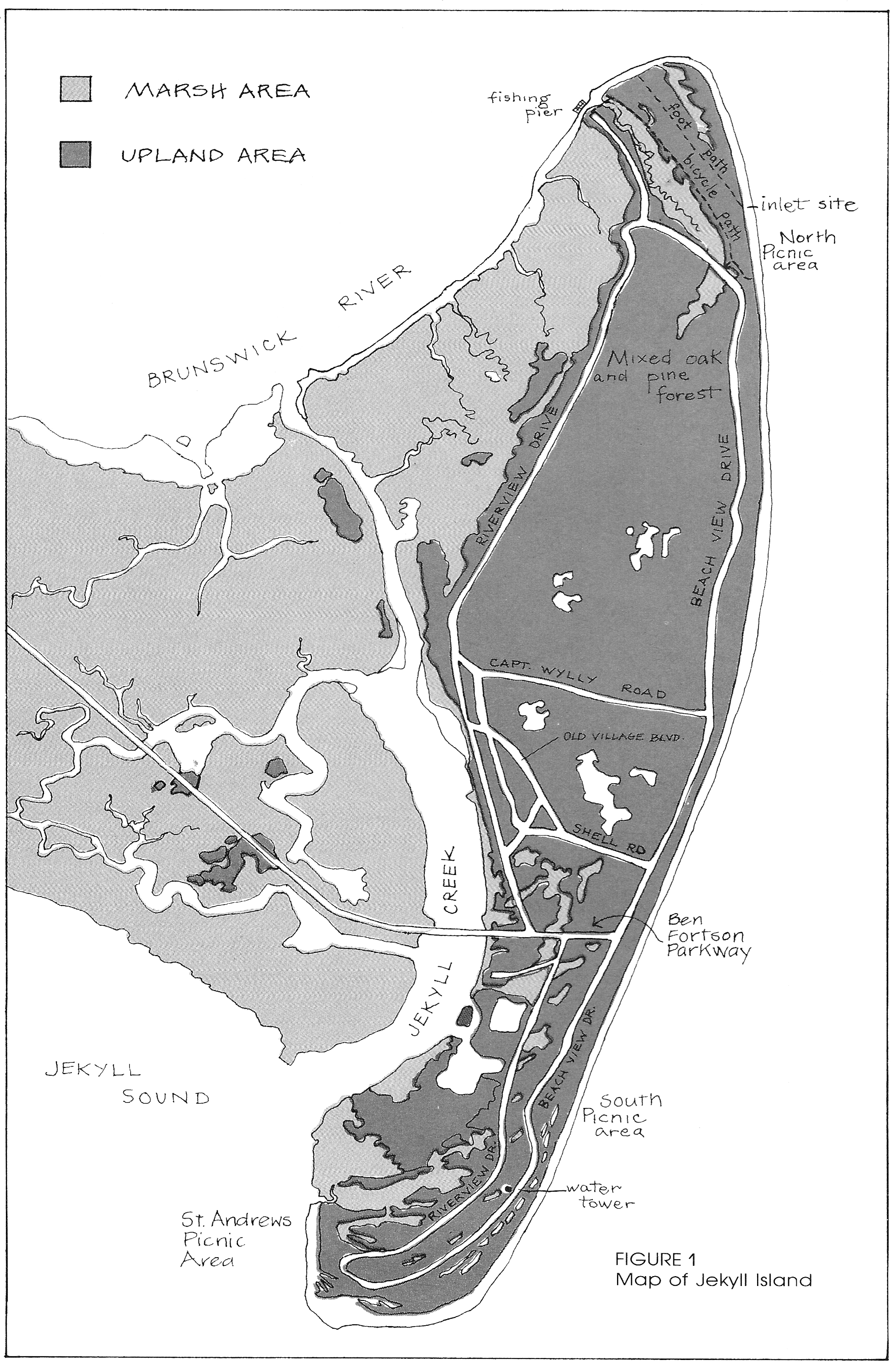
A map of Jekyll Island from 1983

Jekyll Island is one of only four Georgia barrier islands that has a paved causeway to allow access from the mainland by car. It has 5,700 acres (23 km^{2}) of land, including 4,400 acres (18 km^{2}) of solid earth and a 240-acre (0.97 km^{2}) Jekyll Island Club Historic District. The rest is tidal marshlands, mostly on the island's western shore. The island measures about 7 miles (11 km) long by 1.5 miles (2.4 km) wide, has 8 miles (13 km) of wide, flat beaches on its east shore with sand packed hard enough for easy walking or biking, and boasts 20 miles (32 km) of hiking trails.

Like the other Golden Isles, Jekyll is mostly made of older Pleistocene land mass and smaller sections of younger Holocene land. The climate is humid subtropical, with rainfall concentrated in the hottest months.

=== Northern end of the Island ===
The north end of the island is the main area that has been affected by human development over the past few hundred years. Early settlers and the loggers who came afterwards developed plantations in this area. They used fallen trees for the construction of ships. In the early 20th century, much of what was considered wilderness was developed into golf courses.

==== Clam Creek Picnic Area ====
A short winding road leads to a parking lot and one of the three picnic areas on the island. To the west is a vast marsh hammock and a view of the Sidney Lanier Bridge, a 480-foot (150 m)-tall cable-stay bridge on Hwy 17. A large fishing pier extends northwest from the picnic area. To the east, a bridge crosses Clam Creek, in front of an inland marsh, to connect the picnic area to the North End Beach and Driftwood Beach. These beaches are characterized by another tidal creek emptying into St. Simons Sound and a boneyard of pine and water oak tree roots.

==== Horton House ====
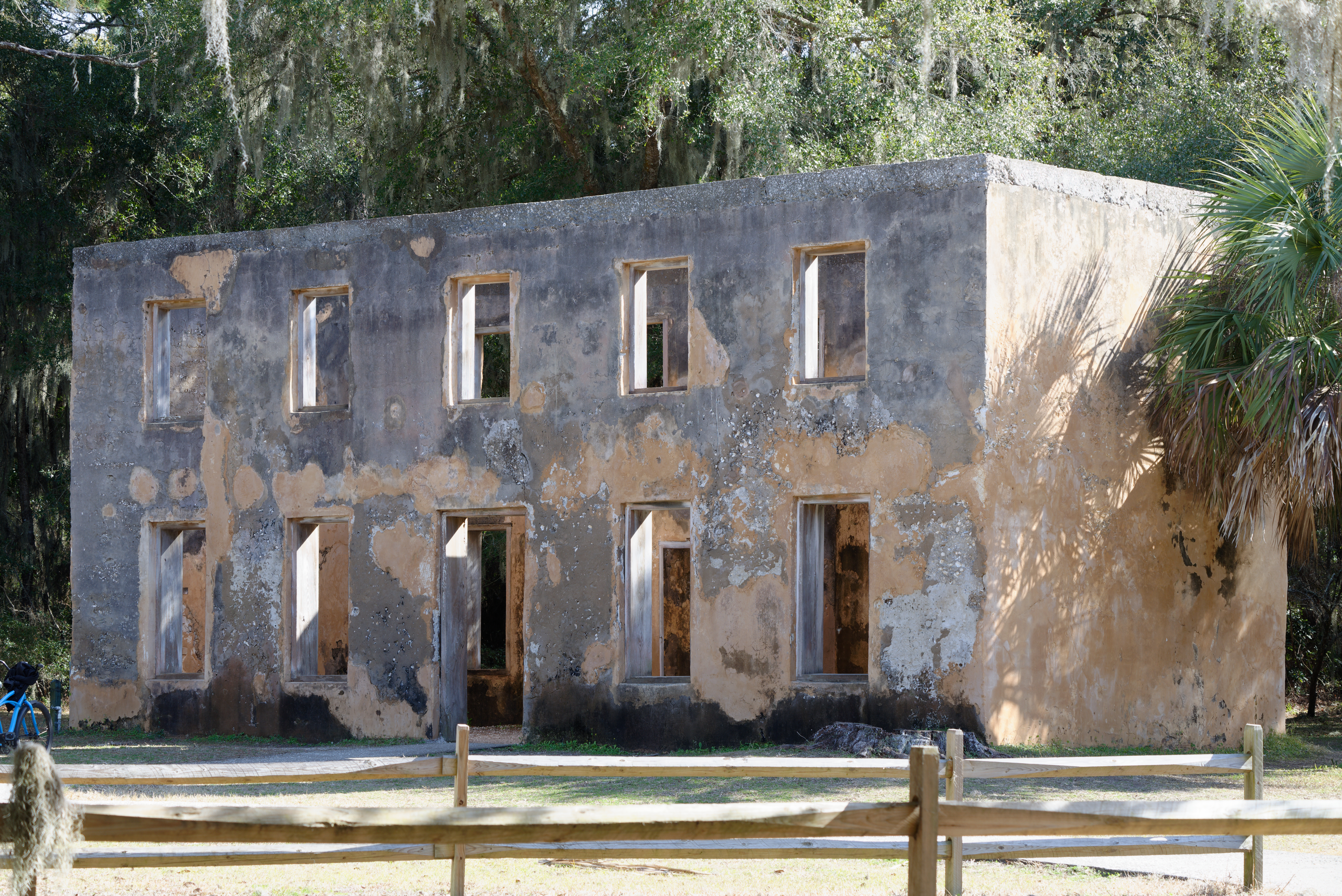
The Horton House ruins

The two-story house built from tabby in 1742 stands along N. Riverview Rd. The frame is intact, while the roof, doors, and windows are gone. Tabby was an indigenous material developed along the coast that was formed from crushed oyster shells, lime and water to make a kind of cement. It is featured in several historic sea island structures dating from the antebellum plantation era. The house was occupied by Major William Horton during the British colonial period. He developed Georgia's first brewery (the ruins of which are a few hundred yards down the road).

The remains of the house have been meticulously preserved over the past 100 years as an example of coastal Georgia building techniques; it is one of the oldest surviving buildings in the state. Across the street from the Horton House ruin is the du Bignon cemetery, established by the next family to own the house and much of the island for generations. Its tabby wall surrounds the graves of five people who died in the 19th century.

==== Campground ====
Just across the street from the entrance to the Clam Creek picnic area is the campground, an 18-acre (73,000 m^{2}) facility in a cleared maritime forest. The campground has running water for restrooms, showers, and laundry, as well as a store and bike rentals.

=== Southern end ===
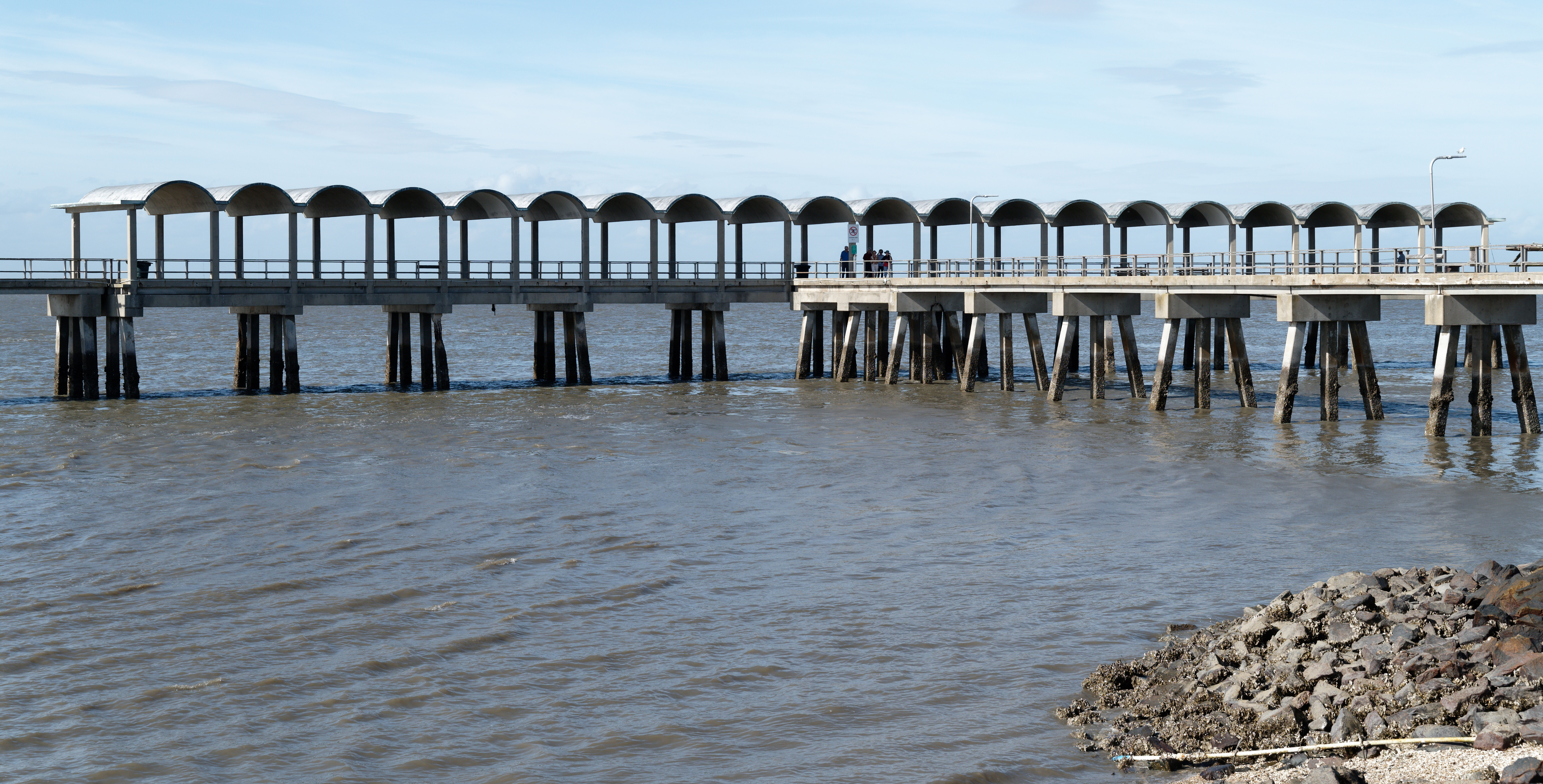
Fishing pier

The southern end of the island was virtually unused by settlers and visitors until the late 19th century, when the army installed a gun mount on the southern end during the Spanish–American War. The installation looked over St. Andrews Sound toward Little Cumberland. In the second half of the 20th century, homes and motels were built by the Jekyll Island Authority along the northern beaches of the island. The multiple parallel dunes on the southernmost tip are a result of sand from the eroding north beaches traveling southward and being deposited in a recurved spit.

==== South Dunes picnic area ====
This picnic area on the ocean side of the island features plenty of picnic tables, a full bathroom with showers, and a boardwalk to traverse the 20-foot (6.1 m)-high dune ridge to the beach. The dune is needed to protect the wooded area and interior of the island from erosion due to storms. This area was repaired in 1983, with bulldozers pushing new primary dunes into place to correct the damage caused by 30 years of beachgoers trampling over the enormous dunes to the beach.

==== Glory Beach ====
Access to this beach is by way of a long boardwalk. It was built in the mid-1980s by the producers of the film Glory, which was partially filmed here, and has been named for the film. The boardwalk, recently repaired, can be accessed from the soccer complex at the south end of the Jekyll Island. The boardwalk passes through a variety of natural habitats, ranging from ancient dunes to freshwater sloughs.

==== St. Andrews picnic area ====
St. Andrews is a picnic area on the intercoastal side of the island, facing the marsh and mainland. It is the farthest point on the beach from Clam Creek. This beach is very popular with fishing birds. Dolphins frequently feed here and travel through the area; they are visible when surfacing for air.

In 2008, the Jekyll Island History Museum, the Jekyll Island Authority, and the Friends of Historic Jekyll Island commemorated the survivors of the slave ship The Wanderer, the next to last ship documented to transport slaves to US territory in the prohibited Atlantic slave trade.

Clotilda, out of Mobile, Alabama, brought in 110 slaves in July 1860, and is ranked last. Because the ship was burned and sunk, some observers thought accounts of its slave voyage was a hoax, but there is considerable documentation. In January 2018 a reporter announced finding wreckage in mud in the Mobile River, which a team of archeologists had affirmed may be the ruins of the Clotilda.

The Wanderer was built in Setauket, New York as a pleasure boat, but it was acquired by Southerners who opposed the prohibition on the Atlantic slave trade. They had it converted in the Congo and Angola to carry slaves, and the captain purchased more than 500 to take to the US. After a six-week voyage in which more than 100 slaves died, on November 28, 1858, The Wanderer anchored near the southern portion of Jekyll Island. Its crew took 409 to 465 enslaved Africans ashore, smuggling them to the mainland. News of the slave ship set off a wave of outrage. The federal government's effort to prosecute the conspirators was unsuccessful.

A public art sculpture was commissioned for this site. It is a 12-foot (3.7 m)-tall steel sculpture of ship sails, intended to signify the harsh, hard nature of slavery.

=== Jekyll Island Club Historic District ===
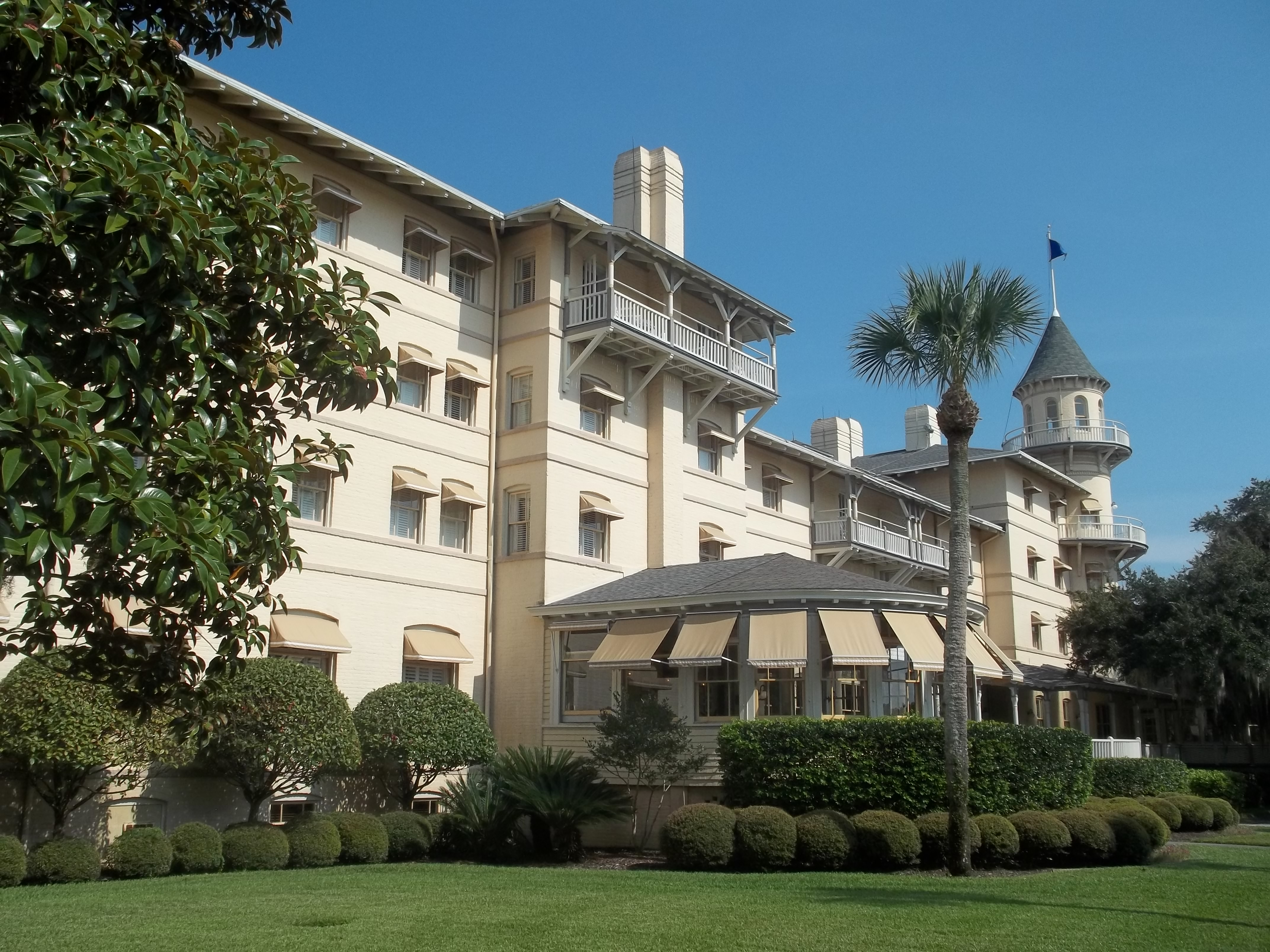
Jekyll Island Club Hotel

In the midsection of the intercoastal side of the island is a designated 240-acre (0.97 km^{2}) Historic District. This includes most of the buildings erected during the Jekyll Island Club era. They have been carefully preserved. The centerpiece of the grounds is the large Jekyll Island Club Hotel, a two-winged structure that contains numerous suites for rental. The presidential suite contains the three-story turret on the front of the building. Thirty-three buildings from the late nineteenth and early twentieth centuries surround the hotel; many are the elaborate mansion-sized "cottages" built by the rich. Some cottages offer rooms for rent for temporary stays. Others have been adapted for use as museums, art galleries, or bookstores. The hotel is listed in the National Register of Historic Places. The historic district itself has been listed as a National Historic Landmark District since 1978.

Tram tours originate from the Jekyll Island Museum located on Stable Road directly across from the historic district. They run several times daily and guides describe much of the history of this area.

== History ==
In the mid-2nd millennium, the island now known as Jekyll was near the border between the Guale people and the Mocama people. Historians have debated whether the town of Guadalquini was on Jekyll Island or St. Simon's Island, and whether the people that lived there late in the 16th century were Guale or Mocama. By early in the 17th century Guadalquini was occupied by the Mocama. Both the Guale and the Mocama became part of the Spanish mission system. In the late 17th century the Guale and the Mocama were driven out of what is now Georgia by attacks from French pirates and from native allies of the English in the Province of Carolina. The survivors resettled in what is now Florida.

The men used spears to take fish from the surrounding creeks. The women were experts on the native vegetation, gathering nuts and fruit. They made a type of tea from parched holly leaves. These settlers were said to also have cultivated the three sisters: squash and pumpkins, beans, and corn (maize); as well as sunflowers and tobacco, which was used for many ritual purposes and celebrations.

=== Arrival of Europeans ===
In 1510 explorers from Spain were the first to land at Jekyll Island, naming it Isla De Ballenas (Whale Island). Later Juan Ponce de León was appointed as the civil governor of this and Spain's other claimed North American territories. In 1562 French explorer Jean Ribault claimed the island for France and renamed it as Ille de la Somme. Ribault later surrendered to the Spanish and was executed. The two countries engaged in competition and armed confrontations along the Georgia and Florida coasts. After his army swiftly defeated the French, Philip II of Spain immediately had a colony established on Jekyll.

More brief conflicts between these two countries along the coastline followed. Spanish priests established missions intending to convert Native Americans to Christianity. No mission is known to have been established on Jekyll; however, the Spanish influenced the island from their mission on St. Simons Island. After the Westo invasion on the mainland, they began destroying the missions and slaying the Spanish priests, traveling south along the coast. They spared Father Xander Davilla on Jekyll, keeping him as a slave. (He was later released to the Spanish in a prisoner exchange).

In 1663–65, England established grants to land stretching southward from their Jamestown colony to an area below St. Augustine, Florida. The English allied with the Cherokee people, Creek people, and Yuchi tribes. They armed the warriors, ordering them to raid the Spanish and Muskogean settlements on Jekyll in 1681–83. By 1702, the English had driven the Spanish from the entire area.

=== English occupation ===
Major William Horton's tabby-structure home. Structure built in 1742; this image taken in 1927.

General James Oglethorpe established Georgia as a colony in 1733. He renamed the island in honor of his friend Joseph Jekyll, who had contributed £600 towards the founding of the colony. For many years, including the "Club Era", the island was spelled as "Jekyl". The Georgia legislature in 1929 passed legislation to correct the spelling to "Jekyll", as used by the former sponsor of the colony.

In the late 1730s, General Oglethorpe appointed William Horton to set up a military post in the area to protect Fort Frederica on St Simon's Island. By 1738 Horton had set up permanent residence on Jekyll Island, near what is now called DuBignon Creek. At his residence, Horton established a plantation that was able to supply the population at Frederica with beef and corn; he depended on the labor of enslaved Africans.

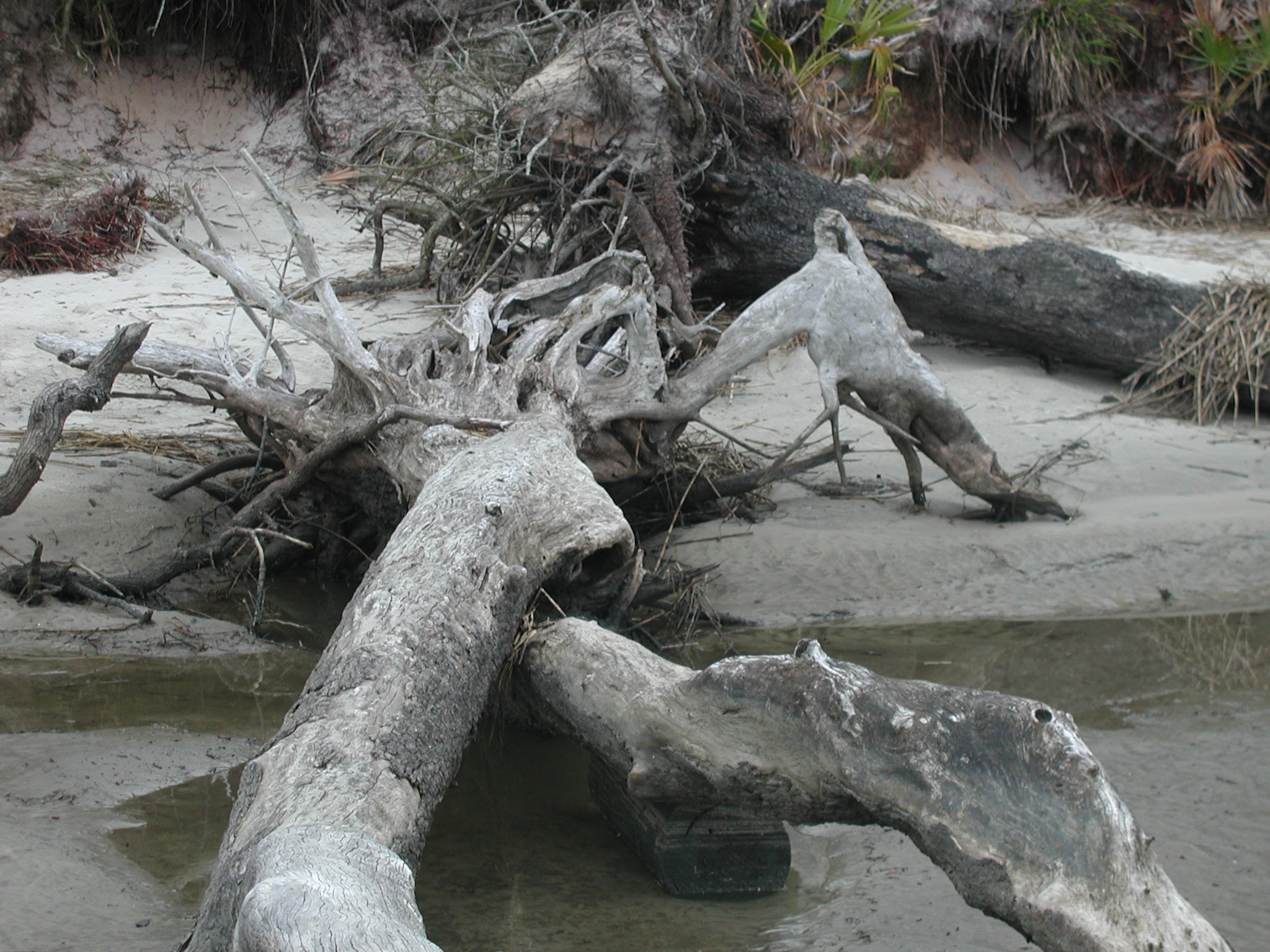
Driftwood Beach on Jekyll Island

Horton continued to develop his property on Jekyll Island. In 1742 his house was destroyed during Spanish attacks, but he had it rebuilt. He developed the cultivation of new experimental crops on his plantation, including barley and indigo. Horton had his house and outbuildings reconstructed after the attacks using the indigenous material, tabby. A mixture of lime, crushed oyster shells, and water, this strong building material has withstood the test of time throughout the Sea Islands. The external structure of William Horton’s two-story house, built from tabby, is one of two remaining two-story colonial-era structures in the state of Georgia. William Horton died in 1748–1749. His property on Jekyll passed through many hands until, just before the year 1800, Christophe du Bignon acquired all of the property of the island.

=== Plantation era ===
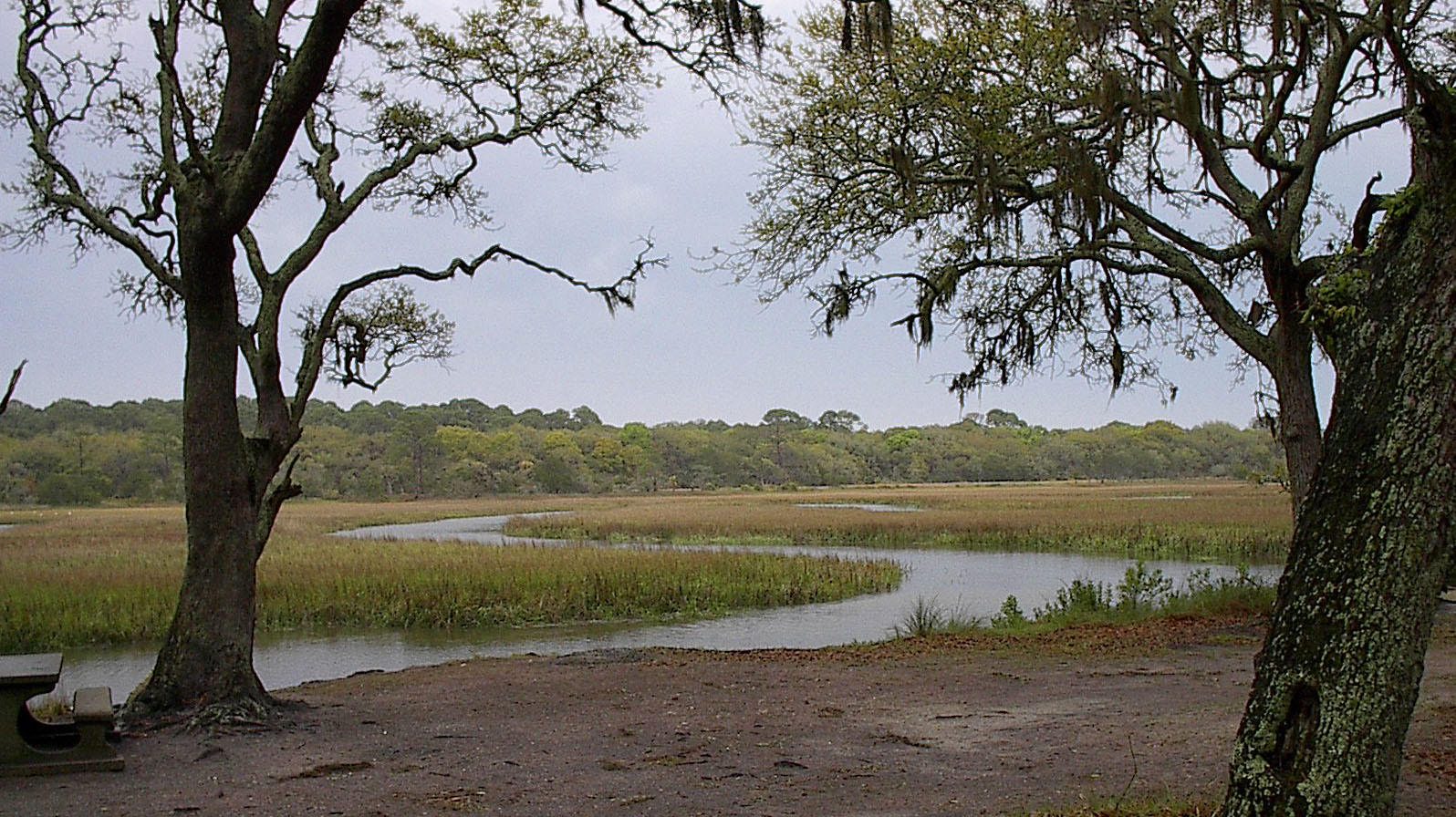
Inland marshes of Jekyll Island

Christophe du Bignon and his family arrived here from France in 1792 as refugees from the violence of the French Revolution against the elite. Du Bignon developed a prosperous plantation based on African slavery. After he died in 1825, his son Henri Charles Du Bignon inherited the property. Under the new ownership of Henri Charles the plantation continued to prosper, as evidenced by the 1850 census.

On November 28, 1858, fifty years after the importation of slaves to the United States was prohibited, the ship The Wanderer landed on Jekyll Island with 465 slaves. This was the next-to-last successful shipment of slaves to American soil from Africa.

By 1860, the plantations on Jekyll had declined in productivity, as the markets had changed and the soil became exhausted. By 1862 when Union Army troops arrived, the Du Bignon plantation was completely deserted. After the American Civil War ended, the Du Bignon family returned to the island. Henri Charles divided the island among his four children.

In 1875 John Eugene Du Bignon, a nephew, became owner of property on the island. He inherited the southern third of the island from his father and intended to build a house.

=== The Jekyll Island Club ===
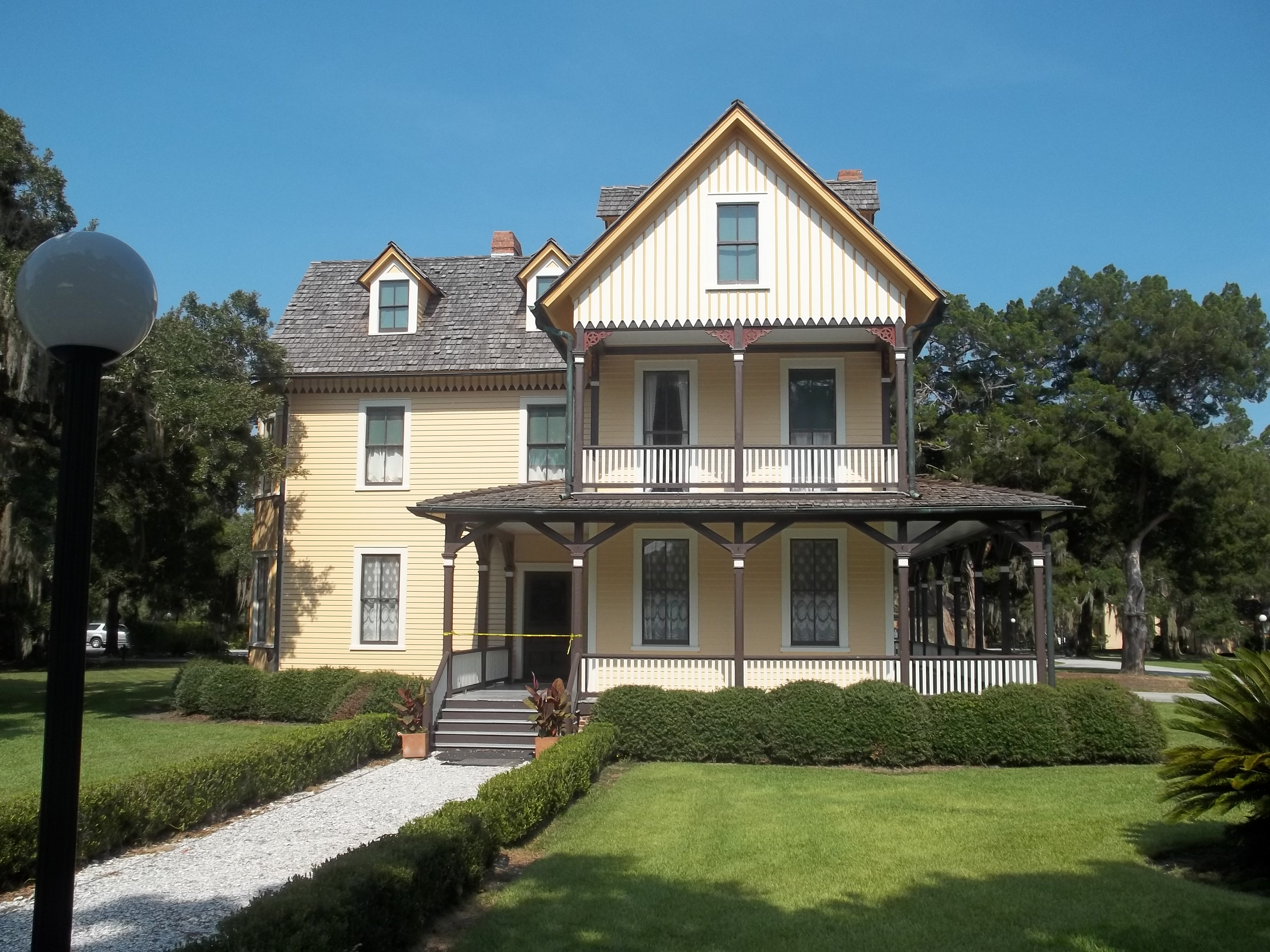
DuBignon Cottage

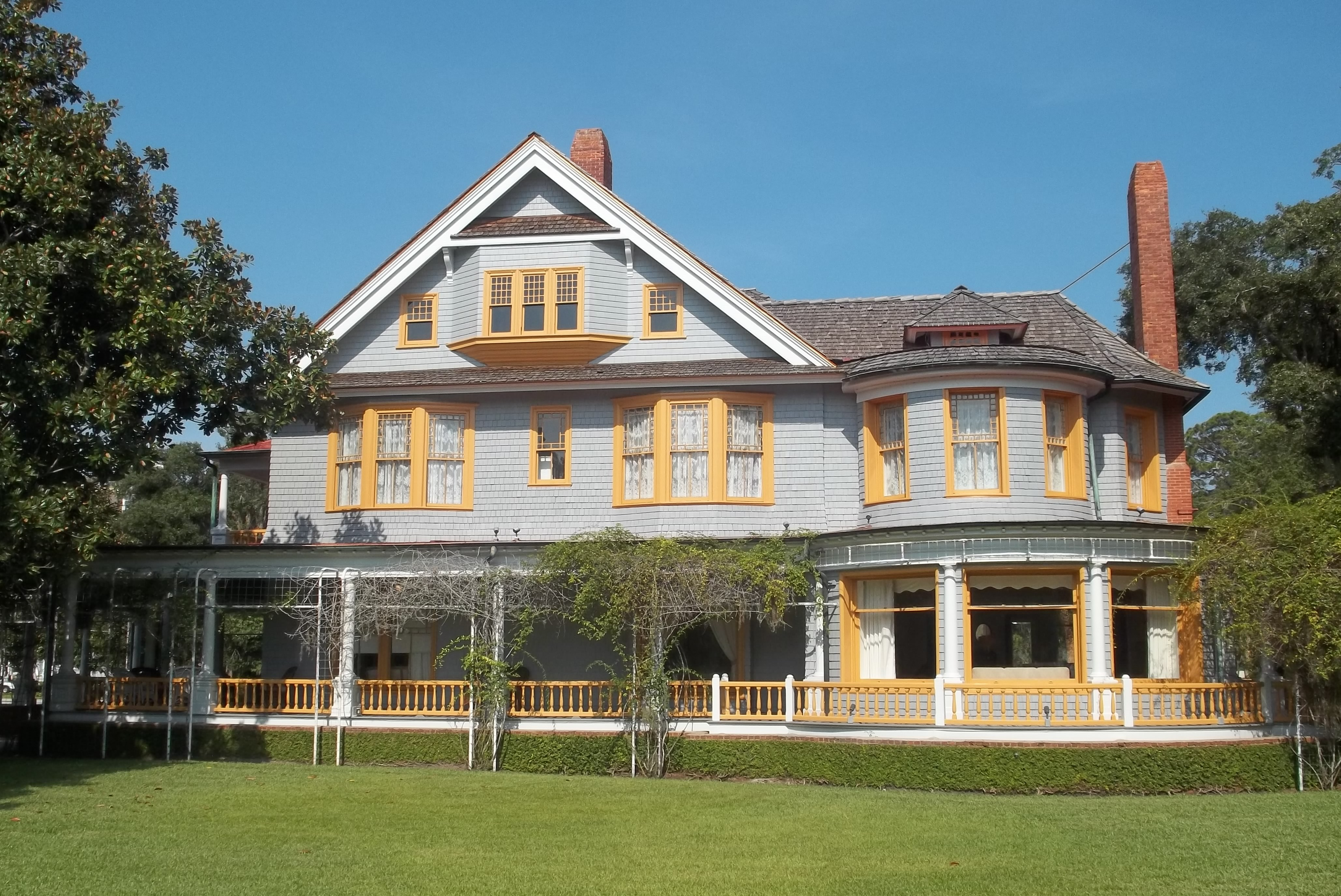
Rockefeller Cottage

Du Bignon purchased the rest of the island from his siblings, with the help of his brother-in-law Newton Finney and an investor. Their plan to market the island as a winter retreat for the wealthy came to fruition on February 17, 1886. They decided to construct a clubhouse which was completed in January 1888. Fifty-three members purchased shares for $600 each; a limit of 100 members was imposed to preserve the club's exclusivity.

From 1888 to 1942 the club opened every January for the winter season, except a few years when there were yellow fever outbreaks. It accommodated some of the world's wealthiest people. Members and their families enjoyed activities such as biking, hunting, horseback riding, and tennis, and frequented the north beaches. Some of the wealthiest members built their own "cottages", mansion-sized residences that are mostly still standing in the 21st century. Even the wealthy endured financial losses during the Great Depression, and the club had financial difficulties. World War II was the final blow to the life of the Jekyll Island Club. The club opened as usual for the 1942 season. However, by the beginning of March, it was announced there would be an early close to the season due to the club's financial situation and the strain the war had on the labor situation. U.S. Army troops bivouacked on Jekyll Island, manning observation watchtowers to spot German U-boats and using the club grounds for communications and a dining mess.

==== Planning of the Federal Reserve System ====
At the end of November 1910, Senator Nelson W. Aldrich and Assistant Secretary of the Treasury A. Piatt Andrew invited five of the country's leading financiers (Frank Vanderlip, Henry P. Davison, Arthur Shelton, Benjamin Strong, and Paul Warburg) to a private meeting at the Jekyll Island Club to develop recommendations for a central banking system that could respond to financial panics like the Panic of 1907. They produced a plan for fifteen self-governing branches distributed over the country, overseen by a national commission that would coordinate policy. Aldrich later submitted this proposal to the National Monetary Commission without mentioning its origins, and a similar federated structure was included in the Federal Reserve Act. The Jekyll Island meeting was not disclosed until 1930, when Senator Carter Glass's claim of credit for the Federal Reserve's structure prompted rebuttals from Warburg and other banking experts.

=== Development of the Jekyll Island Authority ===
Under the administration of Governor Melvin E. Thompson, the state of Georgia gained control of Jekyll Island on October 6, 1947, for $675,000. The island was initially managed as part of the State Park system. However, by 1950, as costs associated with getting the island ready for tourists began to mount, the island was taken out of the state park system. It was organized as a separate authority with the goal of its becoming self-sustaining, considered achievable because of its resources and attractions.

The Jekyll Island Authority was created in February 1950 under the direction of Governor Herman Talmadge. It was designed to be a governing board. This board consisted of nine gubernatorial appointed members and was charged with the operation and care of the island. Black residents of Brunswick petitioned the state for access‚ and in 1950‚ a portion of southern Jekyll‚ renamed St. Andrews Beach‚ was designated for blacks‚ becoming the first public beach in Georgia accessible to African Americans. Five years later‚ the state erected the “Colored Beach House,” which now stands as a historic landmark at Camp Jekyll. The authority placed a convict camp on the island in 1951. In an extension of the lease-convict system, compared to slavery in its abuses, the mostly African-American prisoners performed the manual labor needed to prepare the island for public use. They planted landscaping for drainage, dug and built the foundations of motels and neighborhoods, and built the perimeter road. From September 1951 to December 1954, the island was primarily closed to the public. Upon completion of the six-year causeway project and erection of the drawbridge on December 11, 1954, Jekyll Island officially re-opened for public use.

The Authority was criticized and received negative publicity in the mid-1950s. The Georgia Legislature restructured the Authority in 1957, requiring board members to be elected officials. The state attorney general, state auditor, public service commissioner, state parks department director, and secretary of state were all made board members.

In the next decade, the Authority directed development of motels, houses, the convention center, and a shopping center, as well as the towers at the entrance to the causeway. In the 1970s the Authority began renovating the historic cottages and club hotel in the historic district. During the 1980s, it supervised the construction of bike paths and the re-opening of the clubhouse in December 1987. The legislature reorganized the board membership in the 1970s and 1980s. Now it consists of the Commissioner of the Georgia Department of Natural Resources and eight citizens of the state.

Some of the later construction projects have included the Soccer Complex, the Jekyll Island Tennis Center, gaining Historic District status and designation as a National Historic Landmark in 1978, and opening the Jekyll Island 4-H Center in 1983. Most recently, the Authority completed the Georgia Sea Turtle Center. The Georgia Sea Turtle Center aims to rehabilitate and return to nature cold stunned and other wounded turtles, the primary species impacted by cold stunning is the critically endangered Kemp's ridley sea turtle.

Due to an increasing number of competitive sites, the island had suffered declining numbers of visitors since the late 20th century. In 2006, the Authority planned to revitalize the island. In 2007 it selected Linger Longer Communities LLC (through a competitive process) as its private partner to redevelop a portion of the Island. After a year of planning and hosting public forums throughout the state of Georgia, the Authority and Linger Longer developed a revitalization plan. It includes a renovated Convention Center, with construction of a mixed-use public Beach Village to increase the number and variety of attractions nearby. These will be oriented to pedestrian uses: an area for new retail shops and a public beach-side promenade. By legislative mandate, sixty-five percent of the island is and will remain in a mostly natural state (including parks and picnic areas).

A once-per-day toll has been charged for several decades to enter Jekyll Island. In 1985 the daily rate was $1, as of August 2009 it was $5, and later raised to $10, with an annual pass at $100. An annual pass may be purchased at the Guest Information Center before entering the island.

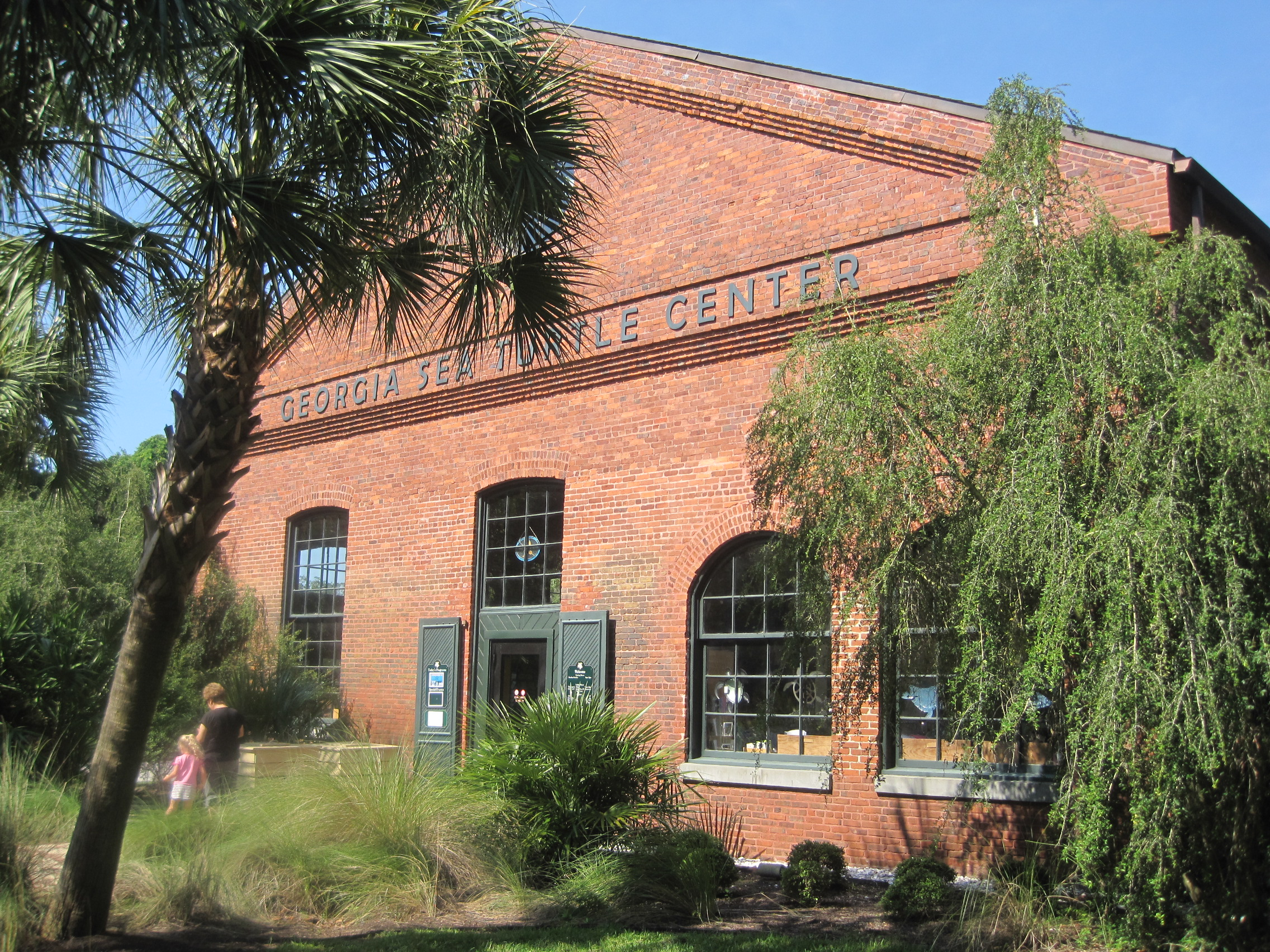
Georgia Sea Turtle Center

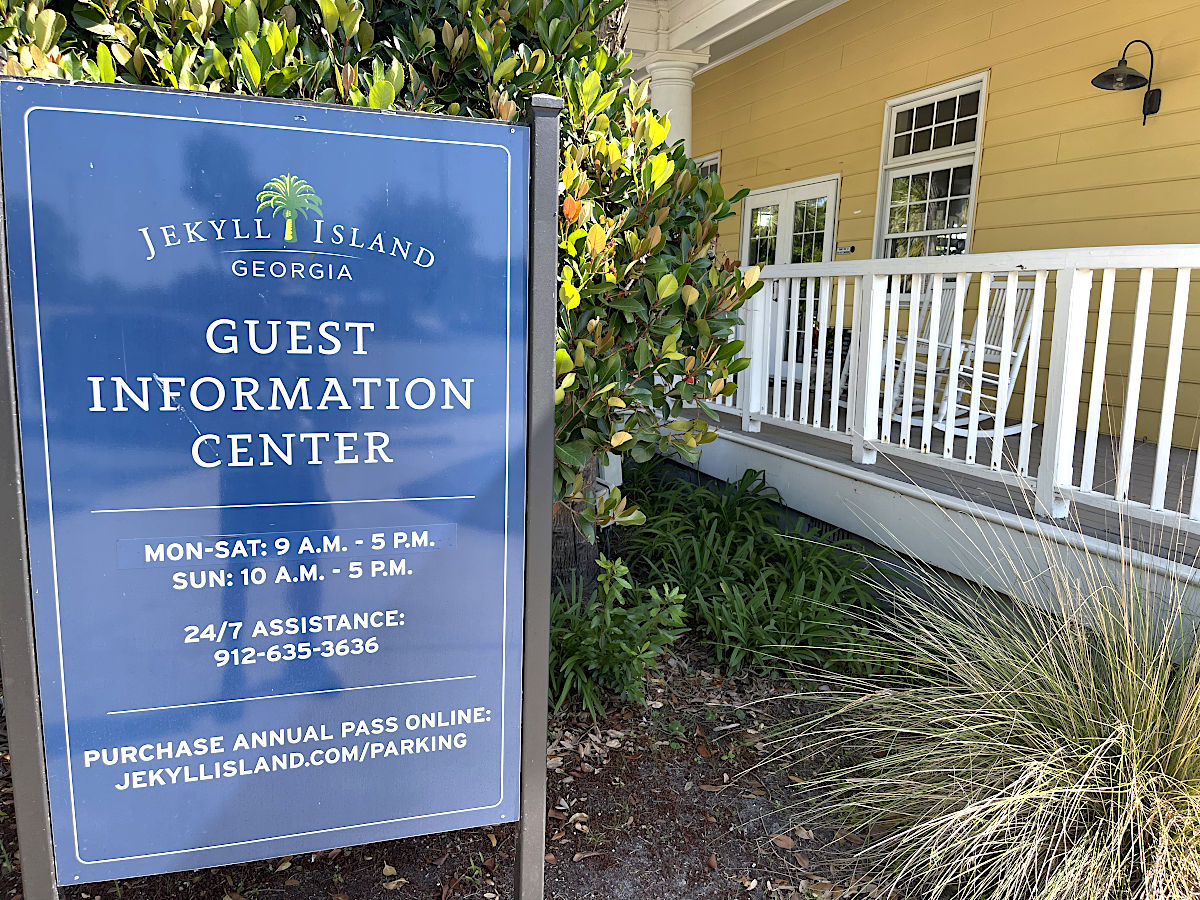
Guest Information Center

== Demographics ==
Jekyll Island
- Census-designated place
- Location within Georgia Location within the United States
- Country: United States
- State: Georgia
- County: Glynn

Population (2020)
  - Total: 866
- Time zone: UTC−4 (EASTERN (EST))
  - Summer (DST): UTC−5 (EDT)

Historical population
Census	Pop.	Note	%±
2020	866		—
U.S. Decennial Census; 2020

Jekyll Island was first listed as a census designated place in the 2020 U.S. census.

Jekyll Island CDP, Georgia – Racial and ethnic composition Note: the US Census treats Hispanic/Latino as an ethnic category. This table excludes Latinos from the racial categories and assigns them to a separate category. Hispanics/Latinos may be of any race.
Race / Ethnicity (NH = Non-Hispanic)	Pop 2020	% 2020
White alone (NH)	823	95.03%
Black or African American alone (NH)	0	0.00%
Native American or Alaska Native alone (NH)	1	0.12%
Asian alone (NH)	3	0.35%
Pacific Islander alone (NH)	0	0.00%
Other race alone (NH)	1	0.12%
Mixed race or Multiracial (NH)	22	2.54%
Hispanic or Latino (any race)	16	1.85%
Total	866	100.00%

== Use as a filming location ==
Scenes from the films X-Men: First Class, Glory, The Legend Of Bagger Vance, Jekyll Island, and The View from Pompey's Head have been filmed on Jekyll Island. On October 27, 2014, Red Zone Pictures filmed here for Magic Mike XXL (2015), starring Channing Tatum. In 2016, a season 7 episode of The Walking Dead was filmed on the island, as well as part of an episode in season 10 in 2019. In 2021, some scenes for The Menu were filmed on Driftwood Beach. The musical version of The Color Purple (2023) shot several scenes on Driftwood Beach in March 2022.

== Transportation ==
Jekyll Island has a small airfield.

== See also ==
- Charles Alling Gifford
- List of Georgia state parks

== Research and further reading ==
- Bagwell, Tyler (1999). The Jekyll Island Club. Arcadia.
- Condominium Hotel & Conference Center, Jekyll Island, GA see www.villasbythesearesort.com
- Jekyll Island Photo and Information Booklet Jekyll Island Museum & Jekyll Island Authority
- McCash, June Hall (2005). Jekyll Island's Early Years. University of Georgia Press. ISBN 0-8203-2447-7.
- McCash, June Hall. The Jekyll Island Cottage Colony. University of Georgia Press. 1998. ISBN 0-8203-1928-7.
- McCash, William Barton and June Hall McCash. The Jekyll Island Club: Southern Haven for America's Millionaires. University of Georgia Press. 1989. ISBN 0-8203-1070-0
- The Jekyll Island Museum and archives, Jekyll Island, Georgia
- Wilkins, Thomas Hart (2007). "Sir Joseph Jekyll and his Impact on Oglethorpe's Georgia". The Georgia Historical Quarterly. 91 (2): 119–34. JSTOR 40584994.
- Doms, Nick (2019). From Millionaires to Commoners. The History of Jekyll Island State Park. AuthorHouse. 2019 ISBN 978-1-5462-6915-1
