= John de Ruiter =

Canadian spiritual leader, author and public speaker

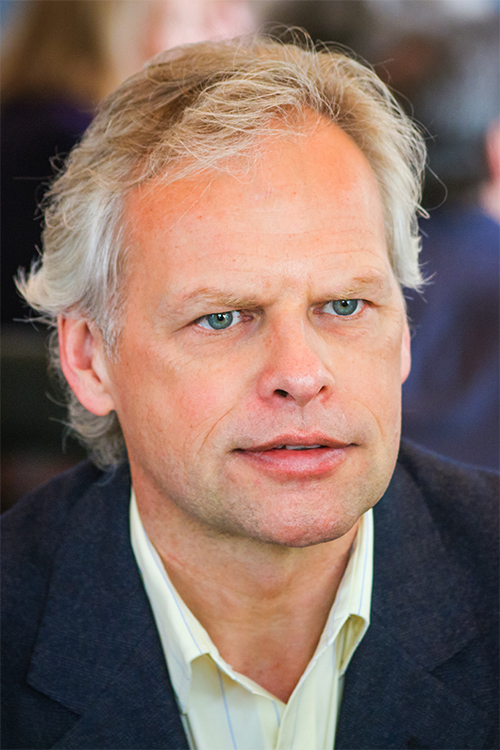
- Born: Johannes Franciscus de Ruiter; November 11, 1959 (age 66); Stettler, Alberta, Canada
- Occupation: Spiritual teacher
- Writing career
- Language: English
- Genres: Metaphysics, spirituality, psychology, philosophy
- Website: johnderuiter.com

John de Ruiter (born November 11, 1959) is a Canadian spiritual leader and author who conducts meetings in Edmonton, Alberta and abroad. He operates a centre called the College of Integrated Philosophy and conducted his seminars and lectures from the Oasis Centre in West Edmonton from 2007 to 2021, when it was sold to the Aga Khan Foundation for $6,650,000.

Born in Stettler, Alberta to a Dutch shoemaker, de Ruiter attended Bible college and interned with a Lutheran pastor before forming his own spiritual practice in the late 1980s. His charismatic presentation and teachings, characterized by one observer as "New Age gospel," attracted thousands of followers over the next few decades, with several academic scholars interpreting his movement as the possible beginning of a new religion.

De Ruiter has built followings in a number of countries, primarily Canada and the United States but also the United Kingdom, Germany, the Netherlands, India and Israel among others. Many of de Ruiter's devotees relocate to Edmonton to attend his seminars and to perform volunteer work for the College of Integrated Philosophy.

De Ruiter has been implicated in a number of public controversies, including accusations of being a cult leader by multiple independent news outlets, and a civil lawsuit in which he was sued by two sisters, who alleged he was in a three-way common law marriage with both women simultaneously. De Ruiter has been accused by former followers of using faith-based claims to coerce them into sexual acts. De Ruiter was arrested on January 21, 2023 for sexual assault of four members of his community.

== Early years ==
John de Ruiter was born on November 11, 1959, to Dutch immigrant parents in the town of Stettler in Alberta, Canada. His father was a shoemaker from Het Bildt in the Netherlands.

At age 17, de Ruiter recounts a spiritual experience involving "innermost contentment" that changed his overall consciousness. The resulting state lasted a year before disappearing as abruptly as it had begun. In the years which followed he sought to rediscover it, studying various spiritual teachings and philosophies to no avail.

== History of ministry ==
Raised in Stettler, Alberta, de Ruiter worked as an orthopedic shoemaker in Edmonton's European Shoe Comfort. In 1983, he moved to Toronto to attend a Baptist seminary. After a year of study, feeling that the leadership was too rigid, he returned to Alberta and studied at the Prairie Bible Institute in Three Hills, remaining there for a year and deciding to intern with a pastor at Edmonton's Bethlehem Lutheran Church.

Occasionally, the pastor allowed de Ruiter to preach at the church, at times presaging the taciturn demeanor which would come to characterize his independent ministry. After some time there, he underwent a ritual in which he described his spiritual history to the elders of the church. Speaking for nine hours straight, he discussed what he called his "awakening" and his search for the truth, alienating some in the congregation but attracting others who were to become his early followers.

In the late 1980s, de Ruiter left Bethlehem Lutheran, with five couples following him to his new ministry, where he offered an unconventional Christian message every Friday from one couple's home. The venue was later moved to his own home in Edmonton's east end, where it remained until at least 1996. Tithes from his followers allowed de Ruiter to devote himself full-time to his teaching.

De Ruiter's reputation rapidly spread when he began to hold meetings in a small bookstore off Whyte Avenue on Edmonton's south side. Within months, his following had grown too large for the bookstore. By the late 1990s, de Ruiter was teaching at Edmonton's Royal Acupressure Clinic, where his followers met several times every weekend.

The assembly eventually moved to a $7 million facility called the Oasis Centre. Operated by de Ruiter's College of Integrated Philosophy, it includes a café as well as an expansive auditorium with a capacity of over 350 people, marble columns and a proscenium stage, and is sometimes rented for wedding receptions. Devotees attend meetings at the Centre and do volunteer work for the College of Integrated Philosophy.

In 1998, de Ruiter began to travel the world, visiting the United States, England, Germany, the Netherlands, India and Israel, attracting large crowds and building followings in those countries, with some of his devotees accompanying him on his travels. His newfound admirers, most having heard about him through word of mouth, began to emigrate to Canada and relocate to Edmonton to be near de Ruiter. By the mid-2010s, de Ruiter had gained thousands of followers.

== Teachings ==
De Ruiter began his religious career interning with a Lutheran pastor, but soon discovered that he appealed more to New Age believers than to Christians. Over time his teachings came to avoid overt references to Christianity, emphasizing instead the devotion to truth, saying, "All there is to do is surrender to what you know is true." National Post's Jeannie Marshall characterized de Ruiter's approach as "New Age gospel".

De Ruiter's teachings emphasize the willingness to let go of ego and desires as well as ideas and beliefs. He draws a distinction between the self and the soul, telling one questioner who said that she felt small, "You feel that because your self is too small for you." Similarly, he distinguishes mind from being, responding to another with, "When you no longer consult with your mind, when you consult only with what you are, in everything you are doing, then you've found the source of life within, which frees us from always having to get something from this life."

De Ruiter rarely addresses the whole group in public meetings but answers questions on a one-on-one basis with individuals from the audience. He often responds after lengthy pauses, sometimes of half an hour or more. De Ruiter's unusual seminar practices have been the subject of reporting; Vice described his practice as the "staring cult."

During these periods of silence, de Ruiter claims to be in a deep state of Samadhi. De Ruiter's teaching style has been compared to oral-based teaching of Tibetan Buddhism where detachment and release are also key principles.

Professor Paul Joosse, then a graduate student in sociology, analyzed de Ruiter's use of interpersonal silence through the lens of Max Weber's theories about the social construction of charismatic authority. Joosse hypothesized that silence helps de Ruiter instill in his followers the impression that he, like other charismatic leaders throughout history, possesses otherworldly traits and miraculous abilities. Joosse proposed three ways in which silence is said to aid in this construction, namely inviting devotees to project upon him an understanding of their individual needs, fostering the emotional perception of intimate bonds even with strangers, and asserting authority through the selective denial of interaction.

== Following ==
De Ruiter's followers believe that, by gazing into their eyes, he is able to directly view the essence of their souls, forming intimate connections even with strangers. Some claim to see an aura around him during meetings, while others report seeing visions including Jesus and Buddha. They call him the "living embodiment of truth" and view him as a "new messiah." Some Canadian aboriginal followers call him "lost white brother", referring to a messianic figure found in several native mythologies.

Vice's Harmon Leon quotes one of de Ruiter's acolytes as saying, "Have you ever taken acid?" she asked me. "That's what it's like when you hear John. You listen and then suddenly something snaps and you get it." Another said, "What John emphasizes is it's not about anything he is saying—it's really about opening your heart and seeing what you see and what opens for you." Explained another, "John opens the door for you and gives you the direction. Once the door is open, you're there," calling de Ruiter a portal to the direct transmission of knowledge.

After attending a meeting with de Ruiter in Edmonton, Stephen A. Kent, professor of sociology at the University of Alberta, remarked "Many people have been spiritual shoppers and they're hopeful that John can pull together the disparate parts of their belief systems," and, "This is the beginning of a new religion. This is how they start." Gordon Dreever, also of the University of Alberta, agreed with Kent's characterization, adding, "Whether it's still around in 500 years or it disappears when he does, who knows."

== Controversies ==
Controversy concerning the movement arose in 1999 when, in a public meeting, de Ruiter's wife confronted him after learning that he was involved with two daughters of a devotee who had invested money into the organisation. The sisters, themselves followers of de Ruiter, would later sue him in court for spousal support. In a sworn affidavit from Benita von Sass in 2013, she alleged that he claimed to be "Christ on earth" and "defying him was to defy truth, goodness and God. Accordingly, I (von Sass) obeyed and submitted."

Further controversy arose in 2014 after the death of one of de Ruiter's female followers under mysterious circumstances and in 2017, after de Ruiter publicly admitted that he had had sex with a number of his female followers. He has referred to this as the Calling.

Jasun Horsley's 2017 book Dark Oasis: A Self-Made Messiah Unveiled examines de Ruiter's life and teachings in critical and skeptical terms.

On Saturday, Jan. 21, 2023, Johannes (John) de Ruiter, 63, was arrested and charged with sexually assaulting four complainants in separate incidents occurring between 2017 and 2020. In response, via a spokesperson, de Ruiter claimed that he was innocent and will "vigorously contest these charges in a court of law".

De Ruiter's followers are buying land around Fort Assiniboine raising concerns for locals.

== Publications ==
=== Books ===
- The Intelligence of Love: Manifesting Your Being In This World, Dragon Hill Publishing Ltd, 2015 ISBN 978-0-994882-00-4 (PB)
- Unveiling Reality, Oasis Edmonton Publishing, 1999 ISBN 978-1894538008 (PB)

=== Audio CDs ===
- True accompaniment, 2005 ISBN 1894748883
- A renaissance of being, 2005 ISBN 1894748905
- Sincerity and comprehensiveness, 2005 ISBN 1894748891
- Sustaining being with being, 2005 ISBN 189474893X
