= John J. Albright =

American businessman and philanthropist (1848–1931)

John Joseph Albright
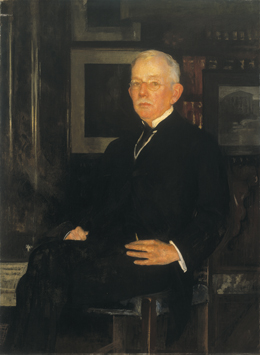
- Born: January 18, 1848; Buchanan, Virginia
- Died: August 20, 1931 (aged 83); Buffalo, New York
- Resting place: Forest Lawn Cemetery
- Education: Williston Academy; Rensselaer Polytechnic Institute
- Known for: Albright-Knox Art Gallery, Ontario Power Company, Buffalo Bolt Company, Lackawanna Steel Company
- Spouses: Harriet Langdon (m. 1872; died 1895) Susan Fuller (m. 1897)
- Children: 8, including 5 by Fuller
- Parent(s): Joseph J. Albright; Elizabeth S. Albright

John Joseph Albright (1 January 1848 Buchanan, Virginia – 20 August 1931 Buffalo, New York) was a businessman and philanthropist, and one of Buffalo's leading socialites at the turn of the 20th century.

== Early life ==
Albright was born on January 18, 1848, in Buchanan, Virginia, to Joseph Jacob Albright and Elizabeth S. Albright, both from Pennsylvania. The family was descended from Andrew Albright, a gunsmith who supplied arms to the troops of the Continental Army during the Revolutionary War, who had come to America in 1750. Albright's father, Joseph, was an iron manufacturer and eventually, president of the First National Bank, coal agent for Delaware and Hudson Canal Company, and the Delaware, Lackawanna and Western Railroad.

His family lived in Scranton, Pennsylvania, when he was a child and he attended public schools in Scranton, then Williston Academy in Massachusetts, ultimately graduating from Rensselaer Polytechnic Institute in Troy, New York, with a degree in mining engineering in 1868.

== Career ==
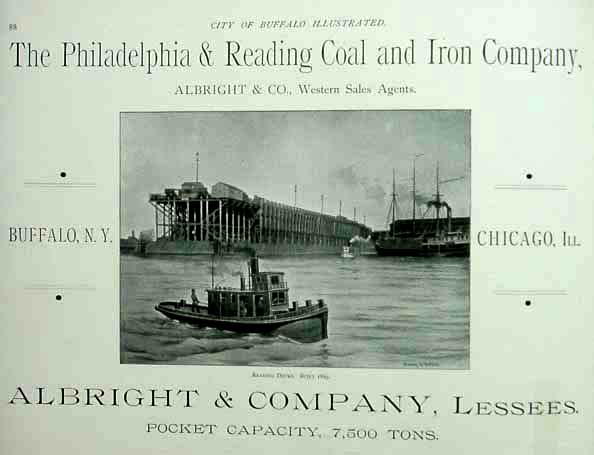
Albright & Company advertisement from 1890

Following his graduation from Rensselaer Polytechnic Institute, Albright returned to Scranton. At that time, coal was in high demand in the Western United States, and Albright got involved in its sale. By 1871, Albright was working out of Harrisburg, Pennsylvania, selling coal wholesale, along with his business partner, Andrew Langdon (1835–1919). Their firm was called Langdon, Albright and Company. By 1873, Albright had married Langdon's sister, Harriet, and they all moved to Washington, DC, where Albright and Langdon started to work for the Philadelphia and Reading Coal and Iron Company.

While in Washington, Albright started an asphalt business with his brother-in-law, Amzi L. Barber (who had married his wife's sister, Julia Louise Langdon). Together, Barber and Albright participated in the paving of Washington, DC, Scranton, and Buffalo. While Albright turned to other ventures, Barber continued with the asphalt business and secured a 42-year monopoly concession from the British government for the Pitch Lake in Trinidad, the largest natural deposit of asphalt in the world. Barber used the asphalt from Trinidad for paving city streets, and by 1900, Barber had laid over 12 million square yards of Trinidad asphalt pavement in 70 American cities at a cost of $35 million.

In 1883, the Philadelphia and Reading Railroad Company tightened its shipping routes and started shipping coal directly by rail through Buffalo, New York, to ship their coal to the west. Albright moved his family to Buffalo to oversee the operations. While there, he entered into partnership with Thomas Guilford Smith, another Rensselaer Polytechnic Institute graduate and Philadelphia and Reading Railroad Company executive. Their firm, Albright & Smith, handled all of Philadelphia and Reading Railroad Company's coal sales in Canada and Western New York, as well as all the railroad's coal going westward from Buffalo. Albright devised a plan to fill up the empty trains with grain on the haul back to the East. Purportedly, within a year, he had earned $100,000 (equivalent to $2,419,000 in 2025).

By 1888, Albright had done so well that he decided to retire and took his family on a 14-month tour of Europe and Egypt when he was only 40 years old. Albright, however, tired of retirement and started working again upon his return. By 1889, Albright's business partner, Smith, had become a sales agent for Carnegie, Phipps & Company Limited, which later merged with the Carnegie Steel Company, of which Smith was its Buffalo representative.

=== Ontario Power Company ===
In 1890, the US Niagara Falls Hydraulic Power and Manufacturing Company and its subsidiary Cataract Company formed the International Niagara Commission composed of experts, to analyze proposals to harness Niagara Falls on the US/Canada border to generate power. They settled electricity (alternating current) as being the preferred transmission method, and after going through many proposals, they awarded the generating contract to Westinghouse Electric in 1893, with further transmission lines and transformer contracts awarded to General Electric. Work began in 1893 and in November 1896, power generated from Niagara Falls at the Edward Dean Adams Power Plant was being sent to Buffaloand the plants of the Pittsburgh Reduction Company, which needed large quantities of cheap electricity for smelting aluminum.

A similar set of events was happening on the Canadian side of the falls. In June 1887, recognizing an opportunity, the Ontario Power Company of Niagara Falls was incorporated in Canada "to supply manufacturers, corporations, and persons with water, hydraulic, electric, or other power." While its operations were in Queen Victoria Park in Niagara Falls, Ontario, its executive office was in Buffalo with these officers: Albright, president; Francis V. Greene, vice president; and Robert C. Board, secretary and treasurer.

In 1903, the company obtained an agreement with the commissioners of the Queen Victoria Niagara Falls Park that allowed the company to develop at least 180,000 horsepower of electricity. The company built its hydroelectric generating plant, which opened in 1905, at the base of the Horseshoe Falls just above river level. The plant had 15 generators, which produced 203,000 horsepower of electric power. In 1904, Albright hired Buffalo architect E. B. Green to design the Ontario Power Company buildings, Murray Street at Buchanan Avenue, including the Entrance Pavilion, Spillway Building, Office and Transformer Station, Gate House, Screen House, and Ontario Power Company Generating Stationat river level.

The hydroelectric generating plant worked by allowing water to enter the generating station from an inlet located one mile upstream of Niagara Falls, near Dufferin Islands, and was then brought to the plant through buried conduit pipes and steel penstocks tunneled through the rock. The conduits, two steel and one wooden (bound with iron hoops and encased in concrete), ran underground 6,180 ft (1,884 m) to the top of the generating station. There, each conduit connected with six penstocks, six feet in diameter. At the point where the conduits and the penstocks join, a section turned upwards into a spillway, called a surge tank, which served to reduce fluctuations in heat and pressure during both the increase and decrease of loads. The open spillways sent any excess water to the Niagara River if the load suddenly reduced, which prevented any unwanted rise in pressure.

From the distributing station, the transmission lines carried power at 60,000 volts each with a capacity of 40,000 kWs, running over a right of way that was 300 ft wide and 32,000 ft long. This ran north to an area down the Niagara River known as Devil's Hole, where they then crossed the river into New York across a 1,300-ft-long span. In addition to the high-tension feeders, tabout 30 miles of lines served Canadian customers at generator voltage.

The power that was transmitted to New York was then sold in bulk to Niagara Lockport and Ontario Power Company, a New York company, which was then distributed to individual customers. The largest individual consumers of power from these lines included several entities with direct ties to Albright: The Lackawanna Steel Company, Empire State Railway, New York Central Railroad, the Shenandoah Steel Wire Company, the Syracuse Rapid Transit Railway Company, the Lockport Gas and Electric Light Company, the Auburn Light Heat and Power Company, the Erie Railroad Company, and the Genesee County Electric Light Power and Gas Company.

The plant continued to operate until 1999, when the Ontario Power Generation (formerly Ontario Hydro) decommissioned the Ontario Power Company Generating Station from service to accommodate the construction of Niagara Fallsview Casino Resort, built on the former transformer building location. As of 2015, the 1905 remaining generating station is owned by the Niagara Parks Commission, and sits abandoned.

=== Niagara, Lockport, and Ontario Power Company ===
In 1905, a syndicate headed by Albright and Henry Herman Westinghouse (brother of George Westinghouse) acquired control Niagara, Lockport and Ontario Power Company from Joseph G. Robin and his associates. The purchasing syndicate included Albright, Westinghouse, New York Central, Vanderbilt interests, and Horace E. Andrews, of Cleveland (president of the New York State Railways, the Mohawk Valley Company, the Rochester Railway & Light Company, director of the New York Central Railway, the Michigan Central Railway, West Shore Railway, Schenectady Railway Company, Havana Railway, and Light & Power Company), among others.

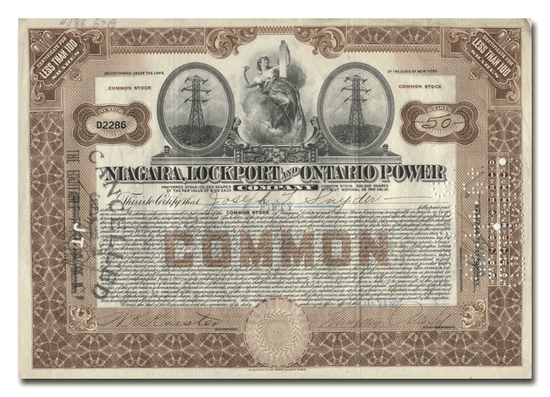
Niagara, Lockport and Ontario Power Company Common Stock

The acquired company's officers were Francis V. Greene, president (also vice president of Ontario Power Company); F. B. H. Paine, vice president and chief engineer (formerly export manager of the Westinghouse Electric and Manufacturing Company); Robert C. Board, secretary (also secretary and treasurer of Ontario Power Company); and Clifford Hubbell, treasurer. Westinghouse replaced Cassius Milton Wicker as a director of the company and the offices of the company moved to the Fidelity Trust Building in Buffalo. Stephen M. Clement, (president of Marine Bank), succeeded Joseph G. Robin on the board of syndicate managers for the underwriting of the company's securities.

By 1908, the company had around 400 miles of transmission lines running from Devil's Hole through Lockport and Rochester to Syracuse, a total distance of 167 miles from the distributing station. It had branch lines running to West Seneca, Batavia, Caledonia, Avon, Auburn, and Baldwinsville near Syracuse. The right-of-way for the lines was owned by the company and was 300 ft in width from the Niagara River to Lockport, 200 ft from Lockport to Rochester, and 75 ft the remainder of the way to Syracuse. The company also leased a right-of-way on the West Shore Railroad from near Akron to Syracuse. In January 1918, Niagara, Lockport and Ontario Power Company acquired the Salmon River Power Company, which operated its own hydroelectric power plan in Salmon River (New York) on the shore of Lake Ontario.

Later in 1943, the Niagara, Lockport and Ontario Power Company reorganized as the Niagara Hudson Company, Inc., and became a subsidiary of Niagara Hudson Power Corporation, which was a conglomerate of 59 separate power companies in Western New York formed in 1929, and in 1932, was the "nation's largest electric utility company". In 1950, Niagara Hudson Power Corporation reorganized as the Niagara Mohawk Power Corporation and in January 2002, Niagara Mohawk was acquired by, and became a subsidiary of, National Grid plc.

=== Lackawanna Steel Company ===
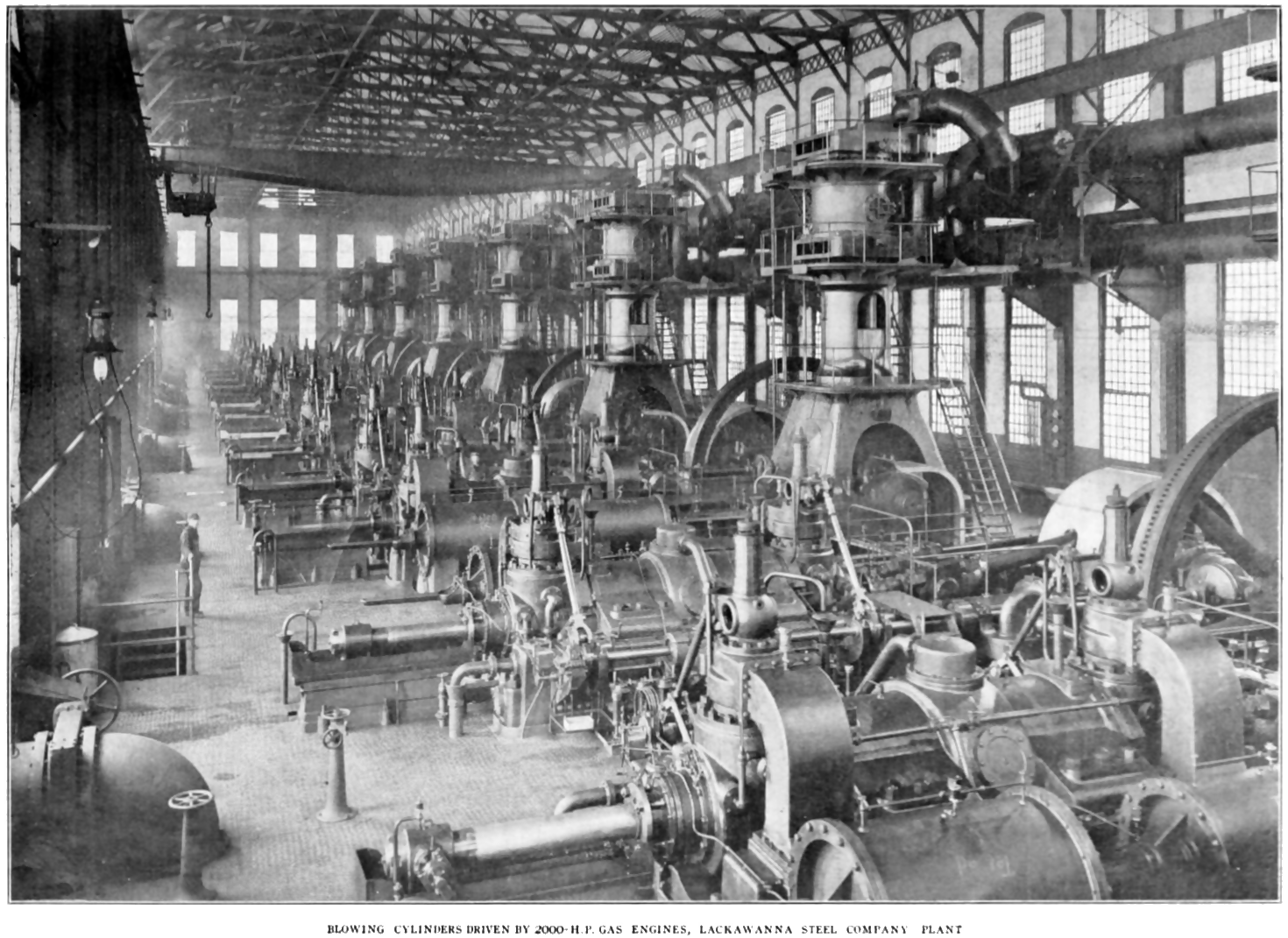
Lackawanna Steel in 1907

In 1889, Lackawanna Iron and Steel Company, at the time the largest steel company in the world, decided to move its facilities out of Scranton, Pennsylvania, because of increases in union labor cost and lack of railroad access to the company's newly emerging markets in the West. They were drawn to Western New York by the area's easy access to the Great Lakes and the numerous rail lines in the area.

Lackawanna Company executives reached out to Buffalo attorney John G. Milburn, who brought in Albright, who had been discussing organizing a steel plant in Buffalo with William A. Rogers (vice president of Rogers, Brown & Company, the largest pig iron dealer in the United States). He asked that Rogers be brought into negotiations, as well as Brig. Gen. Edmund B. Hayes (a civil engineer and businessman with the Union Bridge Company).

To avoid speculation, the company employed Albright to purchase land on its behalf. In March 1899, the company's executives met with Albright, Milburn, and Rogers (Hayes was in Jekyll Island at the time, but returned April 1) in Buffalo and explored several sites, ultimately choosing the undeveloped shoreline on Lake Erie in what was then the western part of the town of West Seneca, New York. Albright began purchasing land on April 1, 1899, and by the end of the month had obtained nearly all the required property for a price of $1,095,430.98 (equivalent to $42,393,000 in 2025). Albright was often accompanied on his purchasing visits by Milburn, the president of the Pan-American Exposition, and at the time, many property owners assumed the land purchases were for the exposition, which helped them obtain the land at a more reasonable price.

In 1900, construction on the massive steel mill started, and in 1902, the company, of which Albright was then a principal shareholder, was reorganized as the Lackawanna Steel Company. The company moved its headquarters to the site and the plant began operation in 1903, By 1909, the residents of the area voted to split off from West Seneca and form the present-day city of Lackawanna, New York, named after the company. The Lackawanna Steel Company received its power from Albright's Niagara Lockport and Ontario Power Company and he served as a director of the Lackawanna Steel Company, which remained independent until 1922, when it was acquired by Bethlehem Steel.

=== Depew Improvement Company ===
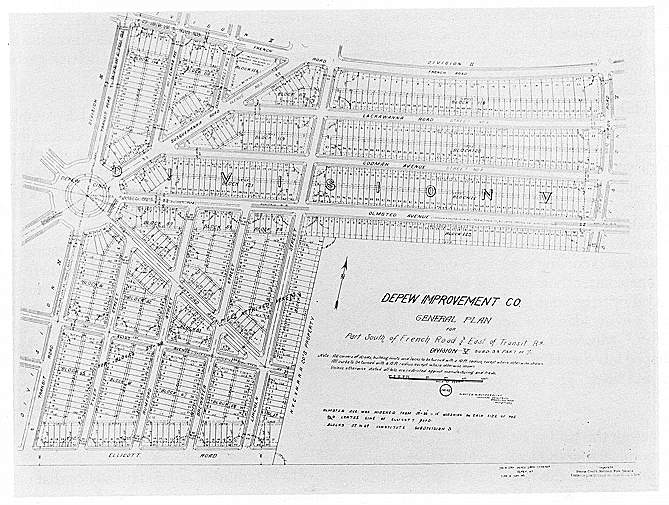
Olmsted Plan for the Depew Improvement Company, Depew, NY

In 1892, New York Central Railroad chose the Depew, New York, area (which straddles the towns of Lancaster and Cheektowaga and lies to the east of Buffalo) as a permanent location for its shops and auxiliary establishments. At the time, only minimal infrastructure was in the area.

Chauncey Depew, attorney for Cornelius Vanderbilt’s railroad interests and president of New York Central Railroad, formed the Depew Investment Company and purchased 1,000 acres of land north and south of the tracks for the enterprise. The original shareholders included Albright, George Urban, Wilson S. Bissell, and Charles Gould. The officers of the company were Albright as president and James A. Roberts as secretary. The area was eventually called "Depew" in honor of Chauncey Depew.

Albright worked closely with Frederick Law Olmsted to structure the nucleus of the town. In 1896, the Depew Improvement Company built a brick building at the corner of Transit and Ellicott (now Walden) for a bank, community center, and village hall. The company donated land for the German Lutheran Church, St. Peter and St. Paul, St. James, the Northside Fire House, Depew Village Park, and a YMCA. The company built streets, houses, and the sewer system.

=== Buffalo Bolt Company ===
In 1897, Albright and Edmund B. Hayes bought Buffalo Bolt Company, which George C. Bell had founded in 1859. Buffalo Bolt produced nuts and bolts that were used by manufacturers in the production of automobiles, ships, trains, household appliances, and hundreds of other products. Under Albright, production increased many times over. In 1869, Buffalo Bolt produced 14,000 nuts and bolts per day, and by 1911, the company was producing 1,250,000 per day. By 1920, Buffalo Bolt was producing 600,000,000 pieces of bolts, nuts, and screws, as well as 5,000 varieties of finished products and 50,000 tons of steel roll.

In 1921, the company's main factory was located at 101 East Avenue in North Tonawanda, New York, the general offices were in Buffalo, and the western offices were at 934 Monadnock Building in Chicago, Illinois, and 1107 Chemical Building in St Louis, Missouri. The officers were Albright, president; R. K. Albright (Albright's son) and Ralph Plumb, vice presidents; G. A. Mitchell, treasurer; and Robert C. Board, secretary. The board of directors was composed of Albright, R. K. Albright, Edmund B. Hayes, Ralph Plumb, G. A. Mitchell, W. P. Cooke, and Anson Conger Goodyear.

The need for workers was so great that company paid the costs associated with passage to America to bring Polish and Slovak immigrants to the United States to work in its plant in North Tonawanda. The company built a company store and assisted employees with obtaining housing, with many employees settling in the Oliver Street area of North Tonawanda. The Buffalo Bolt Company, which employed up to 1,500 people at its peak, was sold to Houdaille Industries in the Fall of 1958 as part of Houdialle's purchase of the Buffalo Eclipse Corporation. Determining that the 500,000 square foot Buffalo Bolt plant was becoming obsolete and too costly to modernize, it closed the plant at the end of June 1959.

=== Locomobile ===
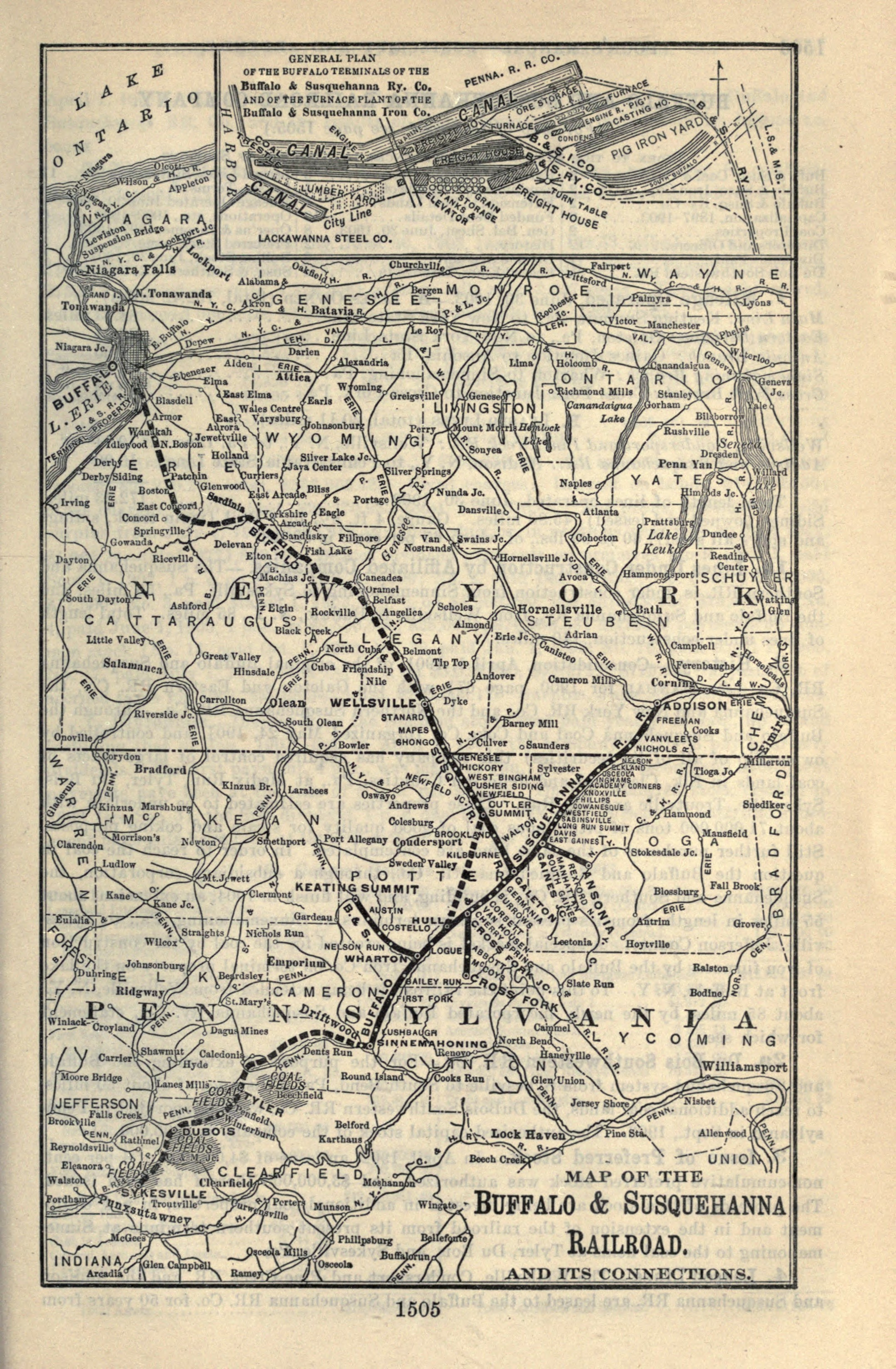
Buffalo and Susquehanna Railroad, 1903

In 1903, Albright's former brother-in-law, Amzi L. Barber, was in debt to the extent of $500,000 (equivalent to $17,917,000 in 2025). He had started the Locomobile automobile company in 1899, and to keep the company afloat, he surrendered two real-estate deals to Albright, who agreed to endorse $300,000 worth of Locomobile commercial paper and give Barber an annuity of $12,000 (equivalent to $4,300,000 in 2025). He also paid the remaining $100,000 Barber still owed. The company did not recover financially and was eventually liquidated in 1922, where it was acquired by William C. Durant of Durant Motors to compete against Rolls-Royce and Pierce-Arrow (manufactured in Buffalo).

=== Buffalo and Susquehanna Iron Company ===
Albright, along with Edmund B. Hayes and Stephen M. Clement, had invested in William A. Rogers’ Rogers, Brown & Company subsidiary, the Iroquois Iron Company, in South Chicago, Illinois, which owned a plant containing two blast furnaces.

In 1904, Rogers invited Albright, Hayes, and Clement to accompany him on one of his periodic visits, as they had not seen the property before. Purportedly, Frank H. Goodyear, another Buffalo businessman, heard of the trip and offered the use of his private car for the occasion. Rogers accepted and invited Goodyear and his brother Charles W. Goodyear to join the party. Goodyear was so impressed with the capacity of the plant to produce tonnage that he wanted one established on the line of the Goodyear brother’s Buffalo and Susquehanna Railroad. Rogers and the Goodyear brothers joined forces to create a company and plant in Buffalo that was called the Buffalo and Susquehanna Iron Company, named after the Goodyear brother’s Buffalo and Susquehanna Railroad.

Soon after, the Buffalo and Susquehanna Railroad, the Buffalo and Susquehanna Iron Company, the Pennsylvania Railroad, and the Lackawanna Steel Company jointly built a giant ship canal on the border of Buffalo and Lackawanna called the Union Ship Canal. The canal, used by all parties, allowed room for steamships to bring in iron ore from Michigan and Minnesota to be reduced to pig iron. The Union Ship Canal continued to be used as an industrial waterway until January 1982 with the closure of the Hanna Blast Furnace.

== Banking interests ==
In May 1893, Albright, along with George V. Forman, John Satterfield, and Franklin D. Locke, founded the Fidelity Trust and Guaranty Company of Buffalo, New York. In 1909, E. B. Green was commissioned to build the Fidelity Trust Building, today known as Swan Tower and owned by Ellicott Development Co., located at 284 Main Street in Buffalo.

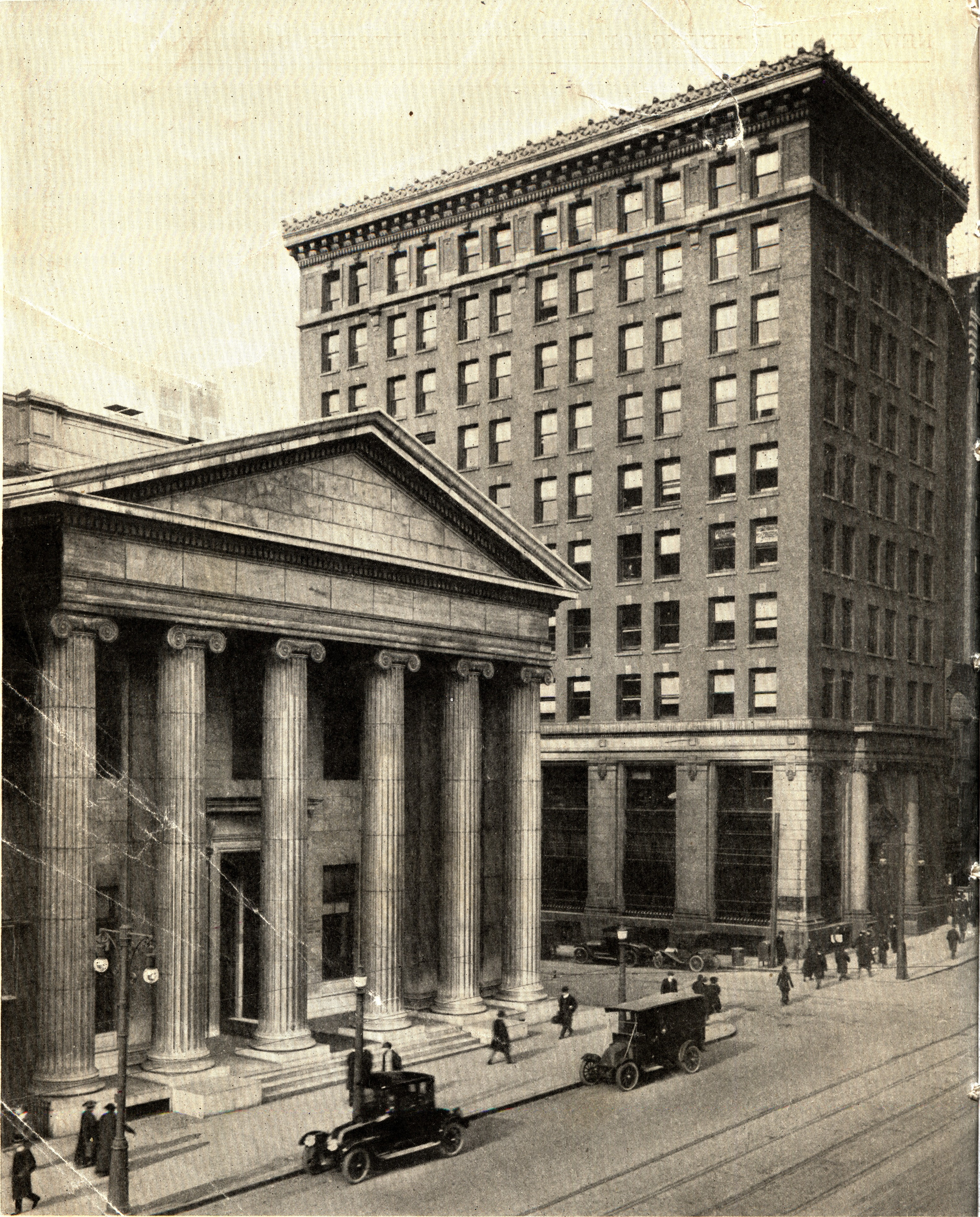
Manufacturer's and Traders National Bank on the left and Fidelity Trust Company on the right, 1916

In December 1925, the Fidelity Trust Company, with $35 million in assets, merged with Manufacturers and Traders Bank, founded in 1856, with $64 million in assets, under the new name Manufacturers and Traders Trust Company (M&T). The $100-million company was headed by Fidelity's president, 36-year-old Lewis G. Harriman. Harriman and a group of investors including A. H. Schoellkopf, from the founding family of the Niagara Falls Hydraulic Power and Manufacturing Company, and James Forrestal, who would become the first United States Secretary of Defense, owned enough shares to control both Fidelity and M&T.

=== Marine National Bank ===
In 1908, separate from his involvement with the Fidelity Trust and Guaranty Company, Albright served as vice president of Marine Bank's board of directors, along with Stephen M. Clement (president), Charles W. Goodyear (founder of the Great Southern Lumber Company), William H. Gratwick (founder of the lumber firm of Gratwick, Smith & Fryer Lumber Co), Edmund B. Hayes (civil engineer and businessman with the Union Bridge Company), William H. Hotchkiss (a lawyer with Hotchkiss & Bush and later state superintendent of insurance), Edward H. Hutchinson (of Maerz Lithographing Co.), Charles H. Keep (secretary of the Lake Carriers' Association and of the Buffalo Merchants' Exchange), John H. Lascelles (director of the Buffalo and Susquehanna Railroad), George B. Mathews (partner at Schoellkopf & Mathews flour mill), Moses Taylor, and Cornelius Vanderbilt III. Albright served as president of Marine National Bank of Buffalo and later as director of the Marine Trust Company.

== Philanthropy ==
=== Albright Memorial Building ===
In 1890, Albright hired E. B. Green of Green & Wicks to design the Albright Memorial Building in Scranton, Pennsylvania, in honor of his parents. The building, also known as Scranton Public Library, was completed in early 1893 and is a two-story, L-shaped, Indiana limestone and Medina sandstone building with Châteauesque-style design elements. The building was added to the National Register of Historic Places in 1978.

=== Schools and churches ===
In 1892, Albright helped found the Nichols School by bringing William Nichols to Buffalo to set up the school, and supported the Elmwood School (which merged with the Franklin School in 1941 to form the Elmwood Franklin School, founded in 1889. In 1904, he donated the land for the Unitarian Universalist Church of Buffalo and gave significant donations to the South Park Botanical Gardens.

=== Albright Art Gallery ===
His largest gift was in 1900, when he made a donation of $350,000 (equivalent to $13,545,000 in 2025) so the then Fine Arts Academy, founded in 1862, could have a permanent home. The building was designed by Green and was originally intended to be used as the Fine Arts Pavilion for the Pan-American Exposition in 1901, but delays in its construction and increased costs (the total cost was purported to be closer to $1,000,000 (equivalent to $35,833,000 in 2025)) caused it to remain uncompleted until 1905, when it opened as the Albright Art Gallery. The Pan-American Exposition was held in Buffalo from May 1 through November 2, 1901.

Green designed the gallery along the lines of a Greek temple and included 102 columns, more than any other American structure except the Capitol Building in Washington, DC. The building was constructed using 5,000 tons of white marble from a Maryland quarry, the same marble used in the Metropolitan Museum of Art in New York City and the Washington Monument in Washington, DC.

When the gallery opened on May 31, 1905, Harvard University President Charles William Eliot gave the keynote address and four city choral organizations performed together. Richard Watson Gilder read a poem he had written celebrating the gallery's opening. Albright, however, did not give a speech or appear in any photographs from the ceremony, as he had always been inclined to avoid the spotlight. Birge Albright, his grandson, said that Albright took friends to the gallery on Sundays when few others were around.

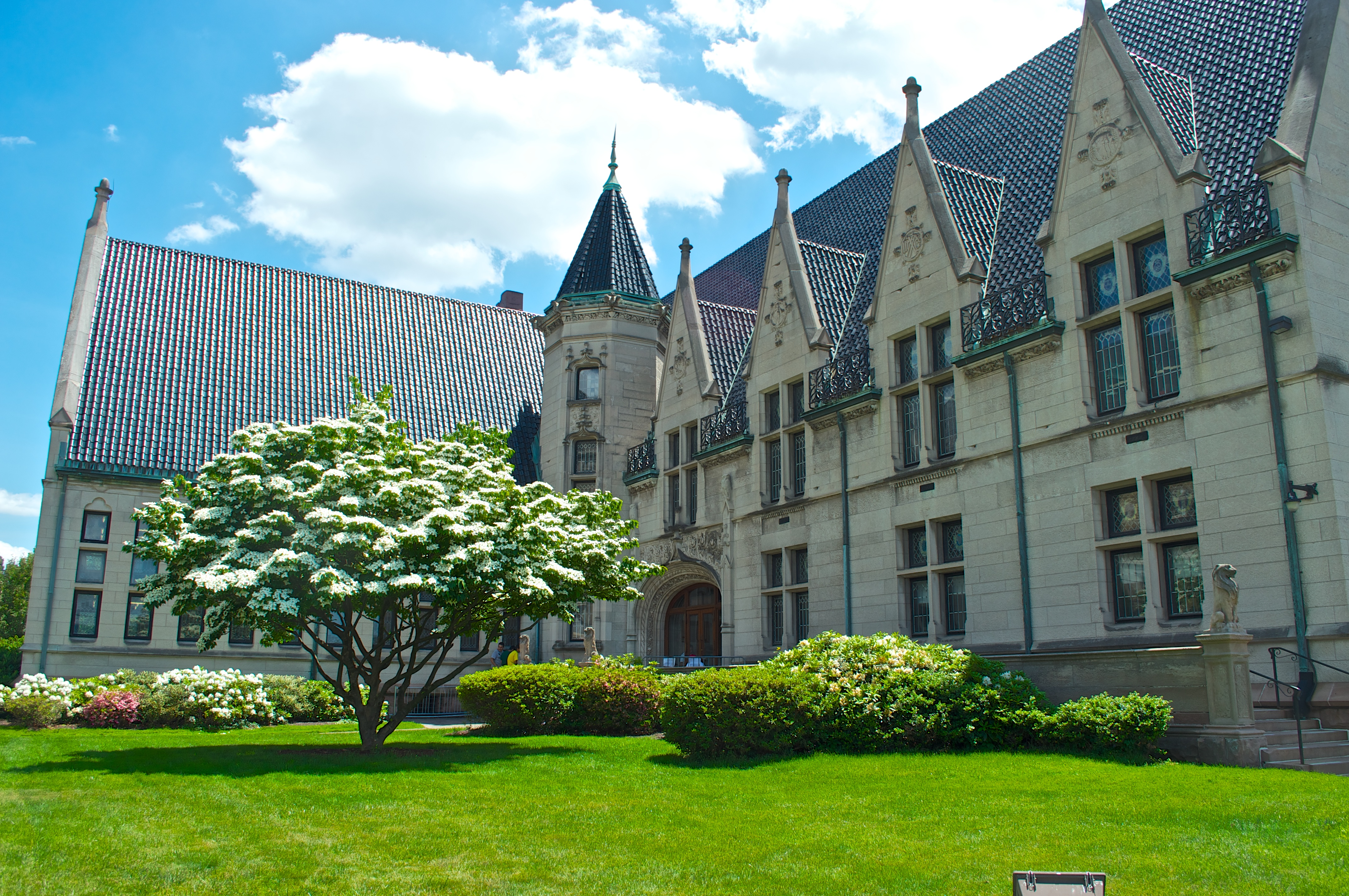
Albright Memorial Building

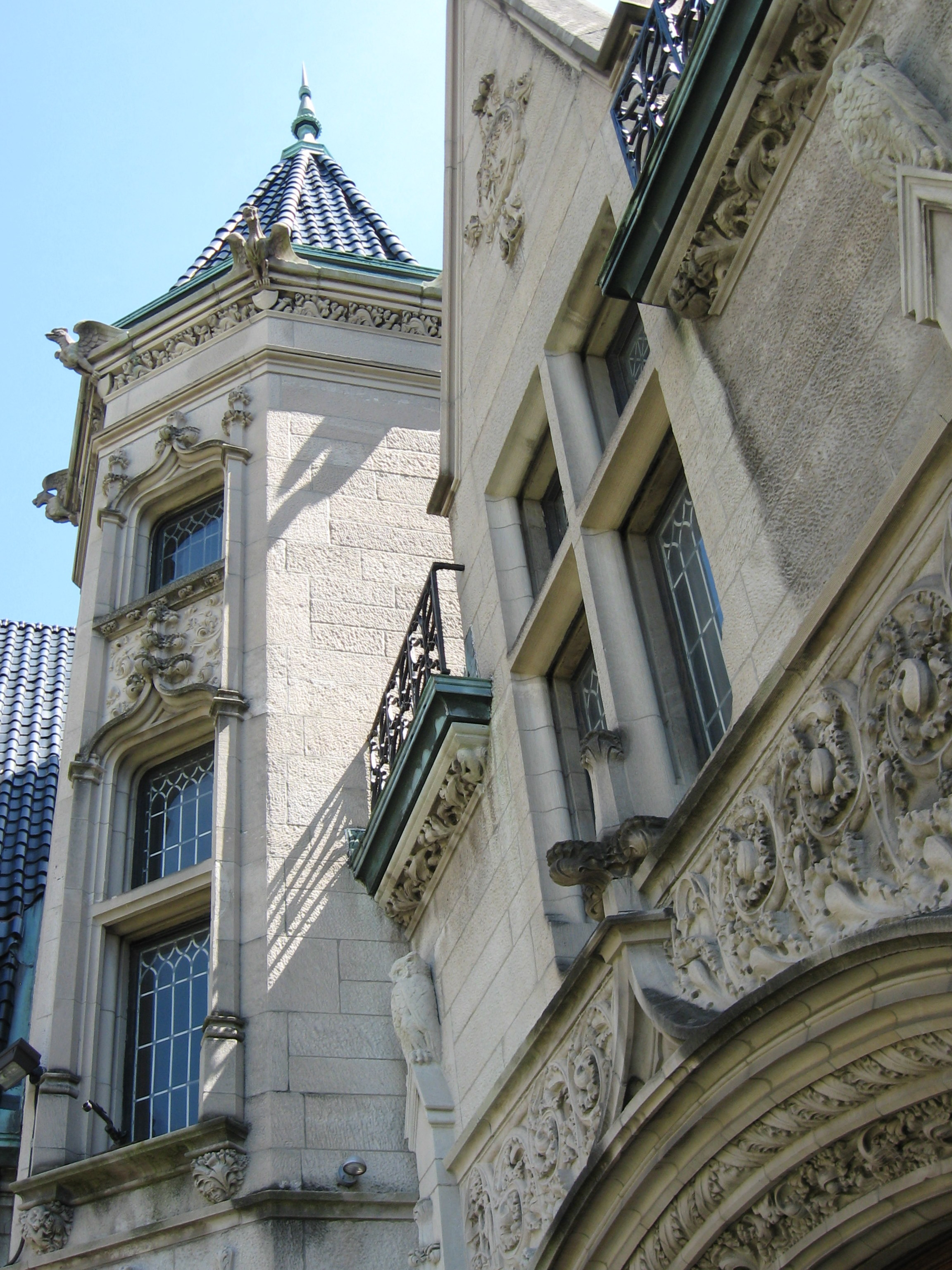
Albright Memorial Building - Detail

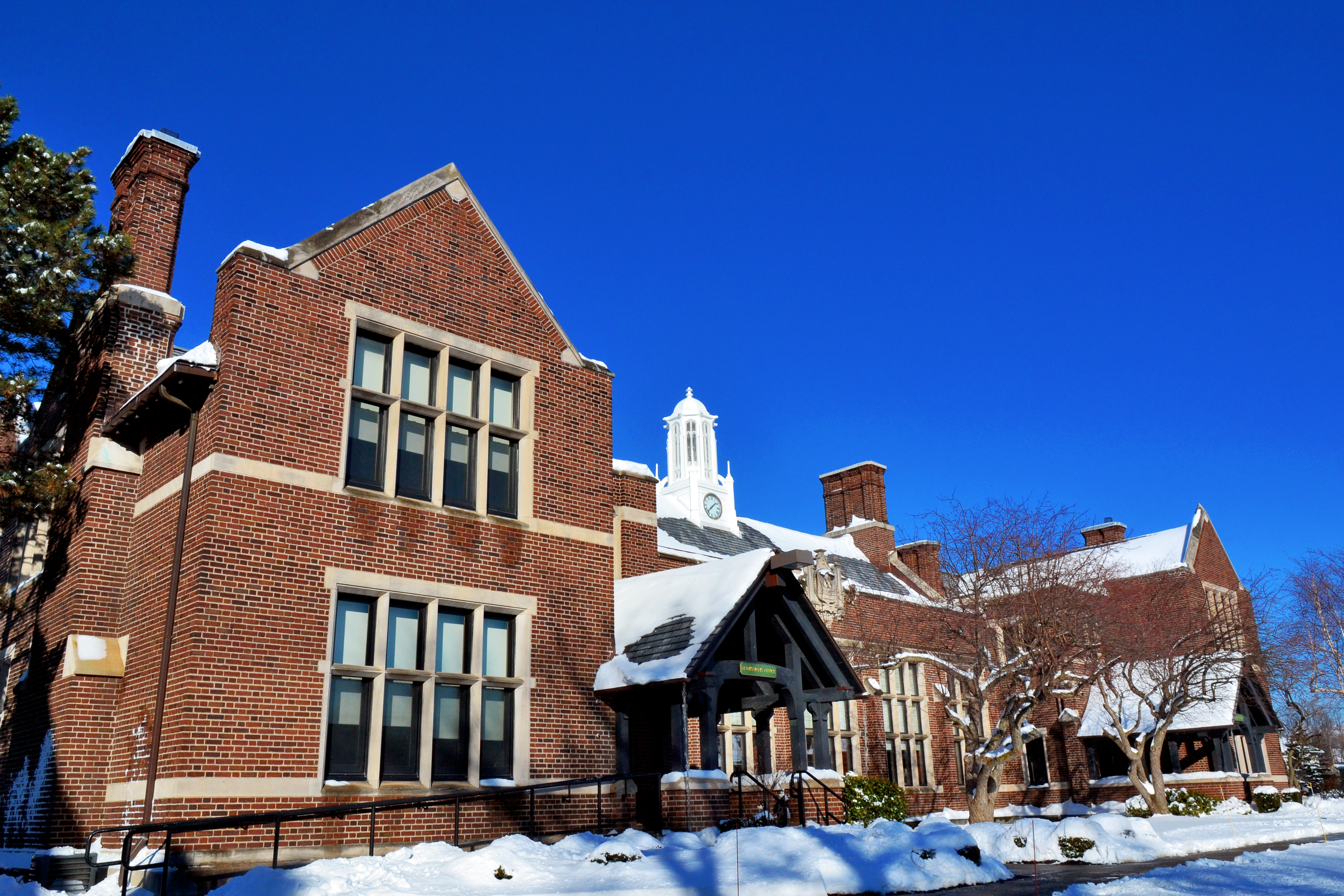
Nichols School Albright Hall

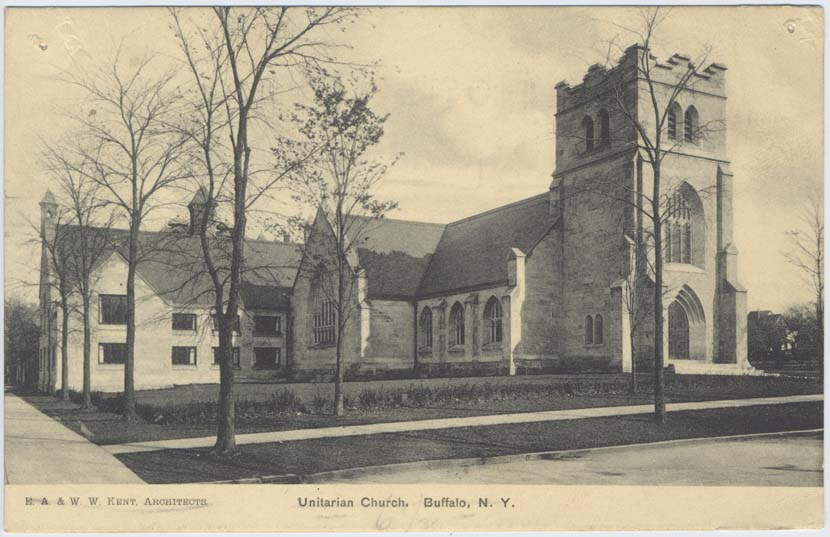
Unitarian Universalist Church of Buffalo

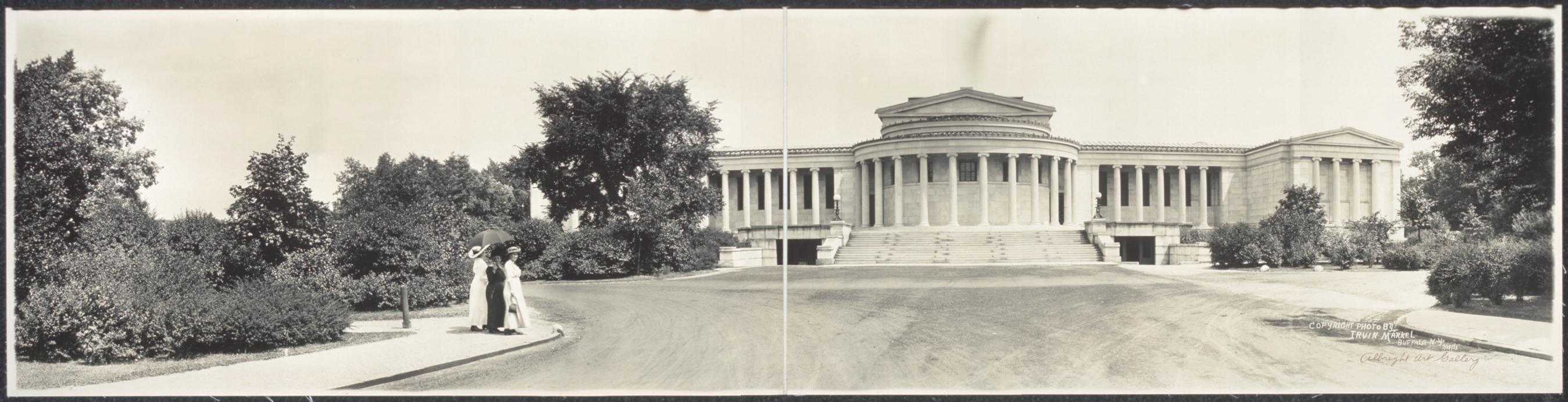
Albright Art Gallery in 1913

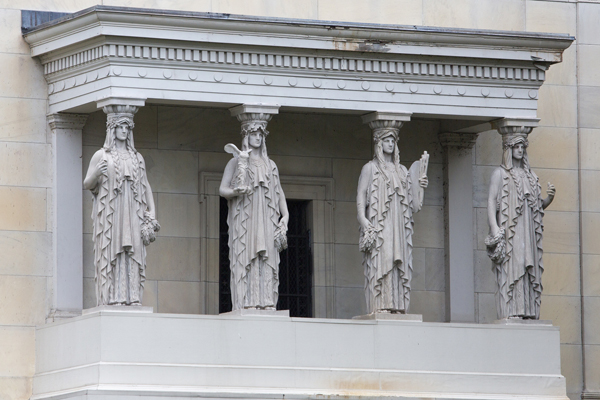
Augustus St. Gaudens "porch of the maidens" on the Albright Art Gallery

== Personal life ==
In 1872, Albright married Harriet Langdon (1847–1895), the sister of his business partner, Andrew Langdon. Harriet and Andrew were first cousins with Olivia Langdon Clemens (1845–1904), the wife of Samuel Langhorne Clemens (1835–1910), also known as Mark Twain. Olivia, who was originally from a wealthy family in Elmira, New York, and Twain lived in Buffalo from 1869 to 1871 where Twain owned a stake in the Buffalo Express newspaper and worked as an editor and writer. Together, John and Harriet had three children, all born in Washington DC: Raymond King Albright, Ruth Albright, and Langdon Albright.

In 1895, Susan Fuller (1868–1928) was brought to Buffalo to educate the three Albright children. In March 1897, within two years of her arrival in Buffalo, 28-year-old Susan (daughter of Eben and Nancy Fuller) married 49-year-old Albright. Fuller was a recent Smith College graduate from Lancaster, Massachusetts. The couple honeymooned at the Jekyl Island Club. Together, John and Susan had five children: John "Jack" Joseph Albright Jr., Elizabeth "Betty" Albright, Fuller Albright, Nancy Albright, and Susan "Susy" Albright.

In 1915, Albright and two of his daughters were painted by Edmund Charles Tarbell. The oil painting, entitled John J. Albright and His Daughters, is owned by the Westmoreland Museum of American Art in Greensburg, Pennsylvania. Tarbell also painted a portrait of Albright that is currently at the Albright-Knox gallery.

John J. Albright died on August 20, 1931, at the age of 83, six weeks after an intestinal operation. He is buried with his family at the Forest Lawn Cemetery, Buffalo.

=== Clubs and memberships ===
Albright was elected a director of the Buffalo Fine Arts Academy in 1887, served as president from 1895 to 1897, and remained on the board until 1910. He was also a member Jekyll Island Club from 1890 until his death. He was a member of the American Academy in Rome, the Buffalo Club, the University Club of Buffalo, the Country Club of Buffalo, and Delta Phi. In April 1926, Albright sold many valuable paintings and works of art, including a Mauve, a Jacque, two by Diaz, a Claus, a Troyon, and others by André Crochepierre, Louis Adan, and Abbott H. Thayer, and a Lawrence portrait of George IV, at the American Art Association - Anderson Galleries in New York City as a gift to Buffalo. In February 1929, the University at Buffalo conferred upon Albright the Chancellor's Medal, its highest honor, recognition of his achievements throughout his life.

Albright's second wife, Susan, was a member of the board of Women Managers' Entertainment & Ceremony subcommittee and the Committee on Fine Artsfor the Pan-American Exposition. Susan died on June 19, 1928.

=== Residences ===
In 1887, Albright acquired the Wadsworth's House, former mayor of Buffalo, at 730 West Ferry in Buffalo. In 1890, he hired the Olmsted Firm to design the grounds. When the house was destroyed by fire in 1901, he hired Green & Wicks to design a new Tudor style home. The Olmsted's work for Albright continued until 1907.

E. B. Green designed the new Albright mansion after the manor house of St. Catherine's Court in Bath England. A former neighbor of the Albrights recalled, "It was a huge house. It was not unlike the Rand House on Delaware". When the property was first built, the streets Tudor Place and St. Catherine's Court did not exist. The property had a red brick wall that surrounded the estate. Local writer Edwine Noye Mitchell wrote that the gray stone house was surrounded "by terraces where the crocus and scilla pushed up between the flagstones in the spring, and the pink magnolia blossoms lay thick over the grass from the sidewalk.

The Albrights' property ran from 690 to 770 West Ferry and extended from West Ferry to Cleveland Avenue on at least 12 acres of land. In 1935, the Albright house on West Ferry was demolished and the estate was sold in multiple parcels for homes to be built. Green salvaged the stone balustrade from the terrace and had it reinstalled in front of Lockwood Library at the University of Buffalo's Main Street campus soon after. A wrought-iron gate, known today as Queen Anne's Gate still stands outside of the property.

In February 1914, Albright and his second wife Susan, purchased the 26-room Joseph Pulitzer Cottage, in Jekyl Island, in Georgia, fully furnished, after spending many winters on the island with their family. While there, the Albrights struck up a friendship with the poet laureate of England, Alfred Noyes, and his wife, who visited them in Jeykl Island in 1914. Albright introduced Noyes to William Rockefeller and other Jekyl Islanders who were at the club. The house was sold in 1931 after Albright's death, and when the state of Georgia acquired the entire Jekyl Island in 1947, the cottage was still standing. In 1951, a fire damaged the interior, and on June 23, 1951, the cottage was demolished as no funds were available to repair the damage.

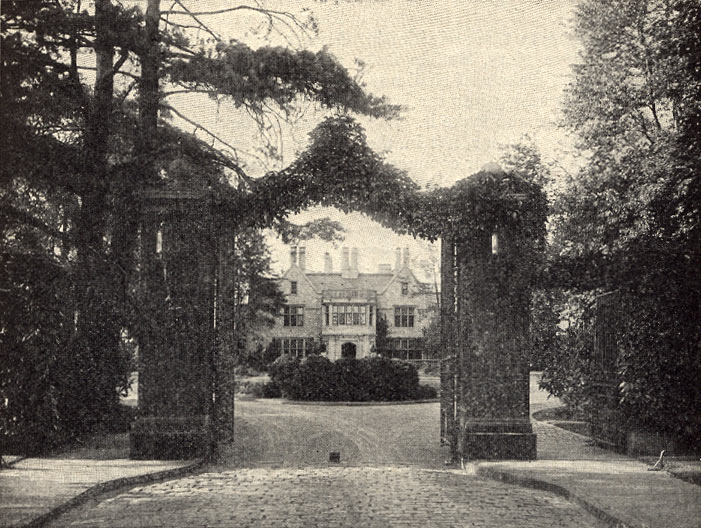
Albright Estate entrance

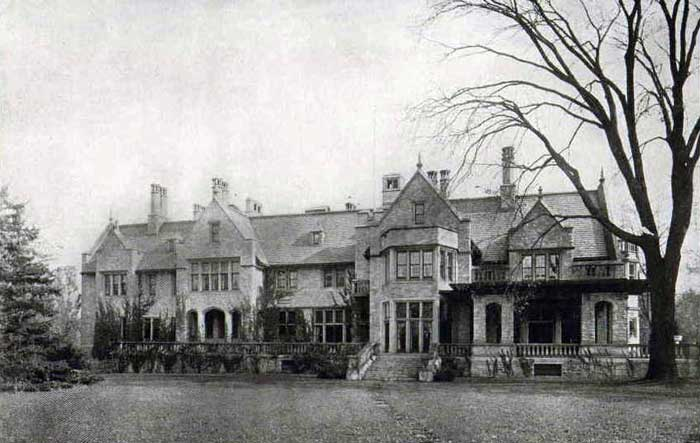
Albright Estate view from the lawn

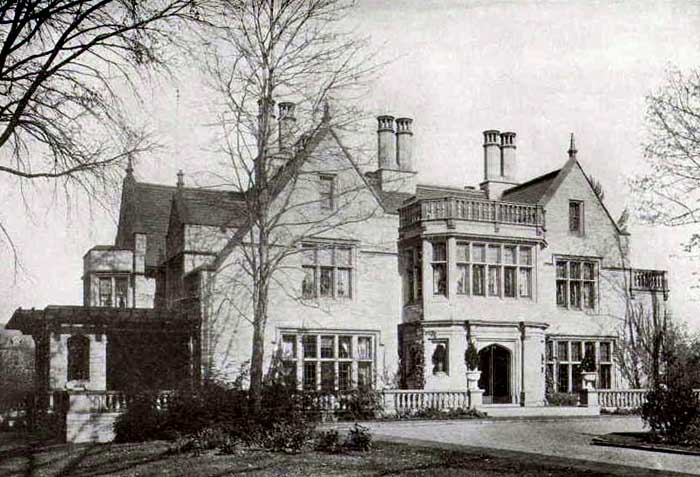
Albright Estate view from the side
