= Edmund B. Hayes =

American businessman (1849–1923)

Brig. Gen. Edmund B. Hayes
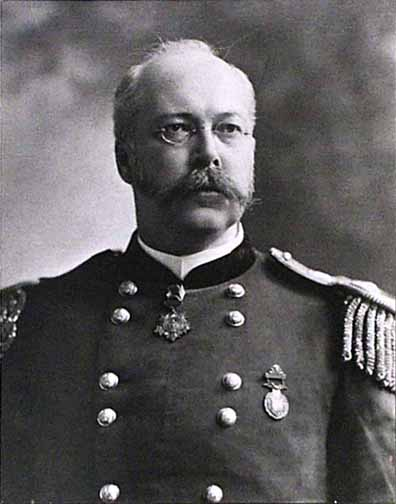
- Born: May 15, 1849; Farmington, Maine
- Died: October 19, 1923 (aged 75); Buffalo, New York
- Resting place: Forest Lawn Cemetery
- Education: Dartmouth College; Massachusetts Institute of Technology
- Occupation: Business magnate
- Known for: Union Bridge Company, Lackawanna Steel Company, Buffalo Bolt Company

General Edmund B. Hayes (15 May 1849 – 19 October 1923) was an American engineer and businessman who built bridges and manufactured autos. He was a pioneer investor in the development of electrical power from Niagara Falls. His company installed the Steel Arch Bridge over the Niagara River and made the first power plant on the Canadian side of the river.

== Early life ==
Edmund B. Hayes was born in Farmington, Maine, in 1849. He attended Dartmouth College intermittently because he needed to earn sufficient tuition by working at farms or teaching. After completing two years, he transferred to MIT, graduating in 1873 with a civil engineering degree.

== Career ==
=== Union Bridge Company ===
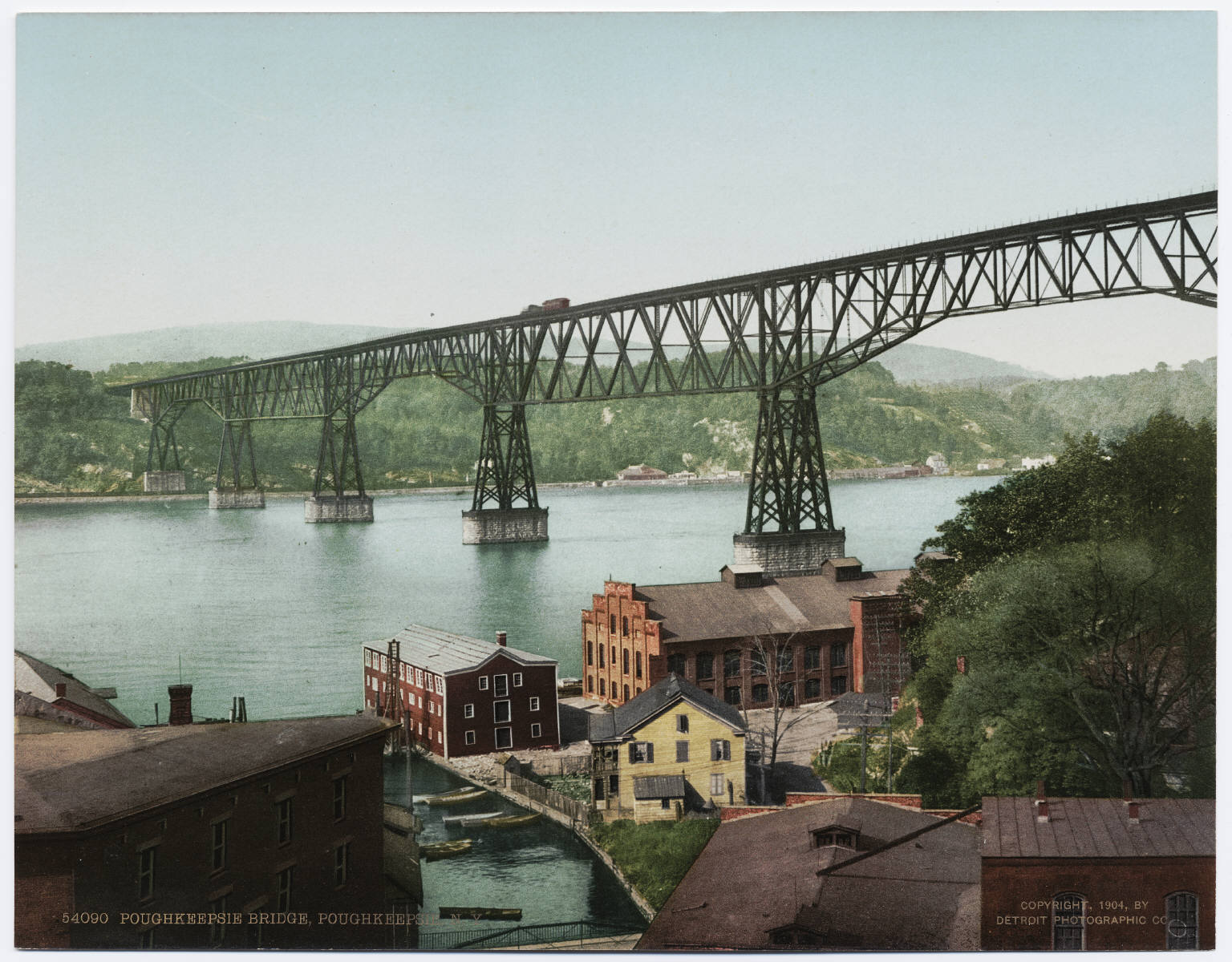
Poughkeepsie Bridge in 1900

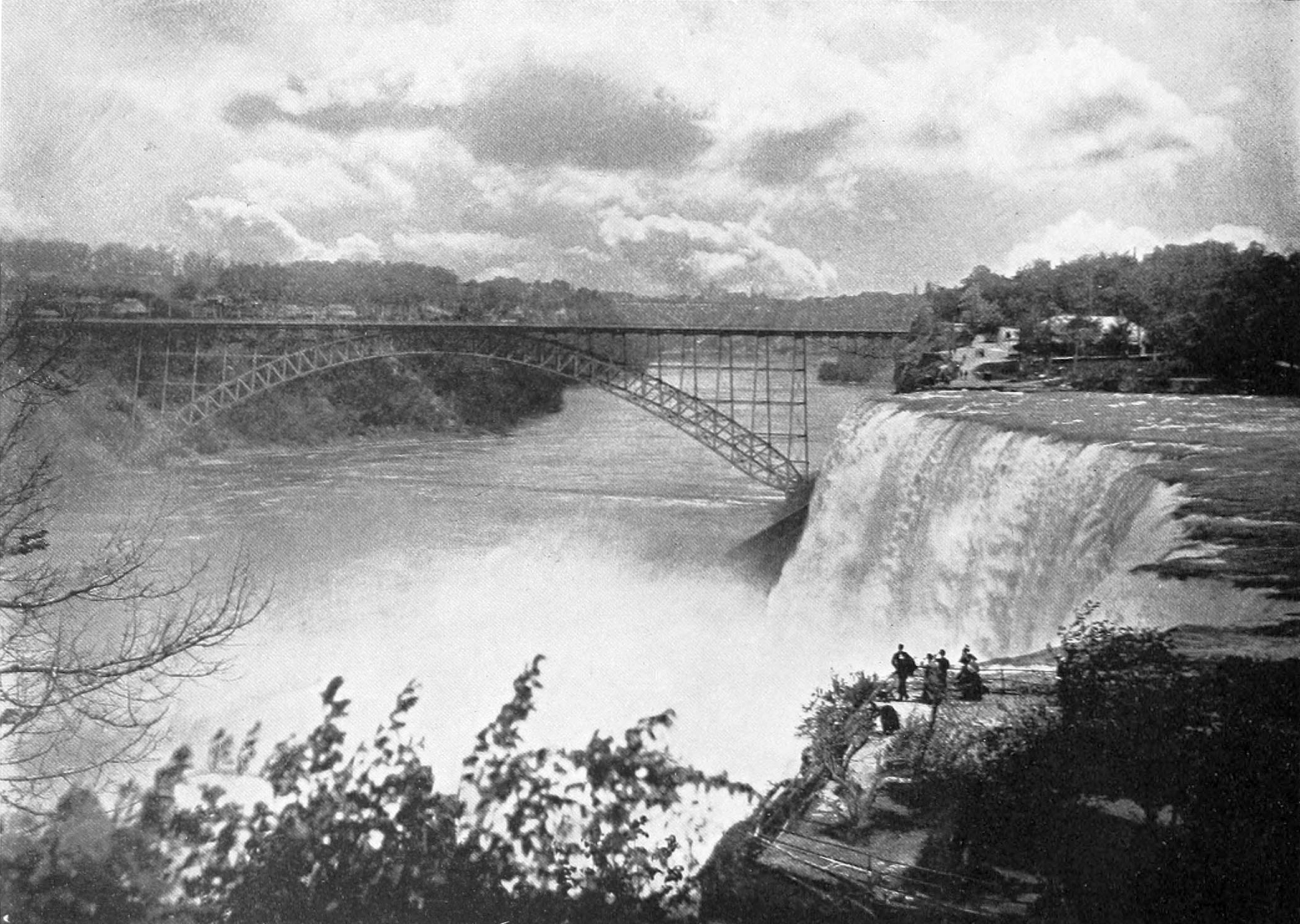
Steel Arch Bridge in 1900

After short stints with the "Passaic Bridge Company" in New Jersey and the Erie Railroad, he came to Buffalo, New York, to join George S. Field, a friend who would later become his brother-in-law, at his "Morrison, Field Bridge Company." In the 1870s and 1880s, with the expansion of railroads across the U.S., many bridge building companies combined to create larger companies and extend manufacturing facilities. The company Hayes worked for became the "Central Bridge Company." In 1883, Hayes was instrumental in persuading the Michigan Railroad that a competitor's design for a bridge spanning the Niagara River in Niagara Falls would not stand the strain of train traffic. He proposed that the railroad use his cantilever design instead. His design would be the first steel span cantilever bridge across the Niagara and one of the largest steel span bridges constructed at that time.

In 1884, the company combined with two other small bridge companies to form the Union Bridge Company, with Edmund Hayes, Stewart Maurice and Field as part owners. He and Field supervised an 8-acre manufacturing site (at the foot of Hamburg St. in Buffalo) where 200-300 skilled workers manufactured 15,000 tons of material for bridges that was shipped around the world. The company also installed the Steel Arch Bridge over the Niagara River and made the first power plant on the Canadian side of the river. The company also built the Poughkeepsie Bridge over the Hudson River in 1888, a bridge that has been saved from demolition by transformation into the Walkway Over the Hudson State Historic Park.

In 1891, the Union Bridge Company was sold to the U.S. Steel Company, which would later become American Bridge Company. Hayes celebrated by taking a long overseas trip with his wife.

=== Lackawanna Steel Company ===
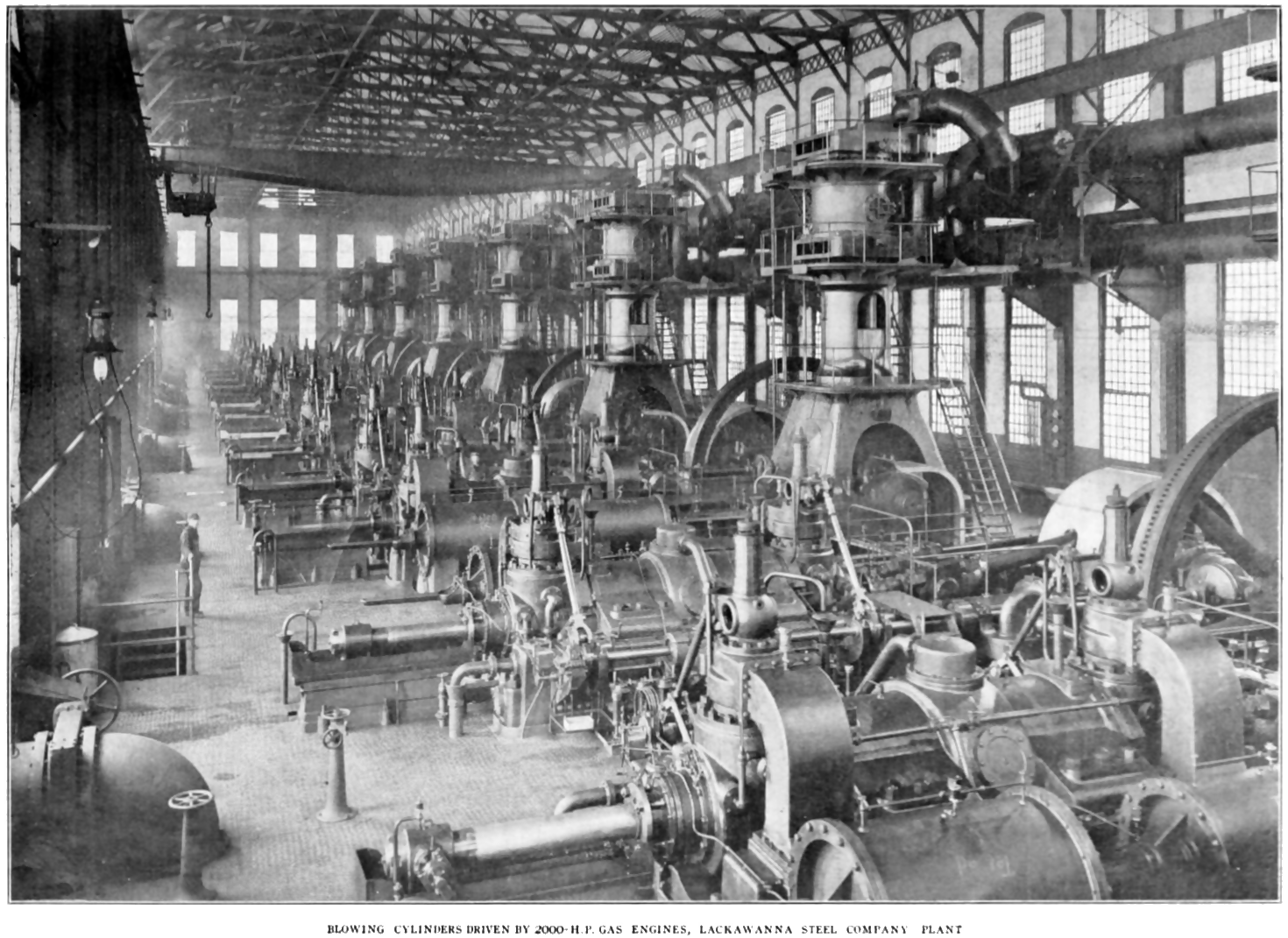
Lackawanna Steel in 1907

In 1889, Lackawanna Iron and Steel Company, at the time the largest steel company in the world, decided to move its facilities out of Scranton, Pennsylvania. Lackawanna was looking to move away from Scranton because of increases in union labor cost and lack of railroad access to the company's newly emerging markets in the West. They were drawn to Western New York by the area's easy access to the Great Lakes and the numerous rail lines in the area.

Lackawanna Company executives reached out to Buffalo attorney John G. Milburn, who brought in John J. Albright. Albright had been discussing organizing a steel plant in Buffalo with William A. Rogers (vice-president of "Rogers, Brown & Company," the largest pig iron dealer in the United States), so Albright asked that Rogers and Hayes be brought into negotiations as well as.

To avoid speculation, the company employed Albright to purchase land on its behalf. In March 1899, while Hayes was in Jekyll Island, the Company's executives met with Albright, Milburn, and Rogers in Buffalo and explored several sites, ultimately choosing the undeveloped shoreline on Lake Erie in what was then the western part of the Town of West Seneca, New York. Hayes returned on April 1, 1899, at which point Albright began purchasing land. By the end of the month had obtained nearly all the required property for a price of $1,095,430.98 (equivalent to $42,393,000 in 2025).

=== Buffalo Bolt Company ===
In 1897, Hayes and Albright bought the Buffalo Bolt Company, which George C. Bell had founded in 1859. Buffalo Bolt produced nuts and bolts that were used by manufacturers in the production of automobiles, ships, trains, household appliances, and hundreds of other products. Under their ownership, production increased many times over. In 1869, Buffalo Bolt produced 14,000 nuts and bolts per day, and by 1911, the Company was producing 1,250,000 per day. By 1920, Buffalo Bolt was producing 600,000,000 pieces of bolts, nuts, and screws as well as 5,000 varieties of finished products and 50,000 tons of steel rolled.

In 1921, the company's main factory was located at 101 East Avenue in North Tonawanda, New York, the general offices were in Buffalo, and the western offices were at 934 Monadnock Building in Chicago and 1107 Chemical Building in St. Louis. The officers were: Albright, president; R. K. Albright (Albright's son) and Ralph Plumb, vice presidents; G. A. Mitchell, treasurer; Robert C. Board, secretary. The Board of Directors was composed of: Hayes, Albright, R. K. Albright, Ralph Plumb, G. A. Mitchell, W. P. Cooke, and Anson Conger Goodyear (son of Charles W. Goodyear).

=== Buffalo and Susquehanna Iron Company ===
Hayes, along with Albright and Stephen Merrill Clement, had invested in William A. Rogers’ "Rogers, Brown & Company" subsidiary, "The Iroquois Iron Company," in South Chicago, Illinois, which owned a plant containing two blast furnaces.

In 1904, Rogers invited Hayes, Albright and Clement to accompany him on one of his periodic visits, as they had not seen the property before. Purportedly, Frank H. Goodyear, another Buffalo businessman, heard of the trip and offered the use of his private car for the occasion. Rogers accepted and invited Goodyear and his brother Charles W. Goodyear to join the party. Goodyear was so impressed with the capacity of the plant to produce tonnage that he wanted one established on the line of the Goodyear brothers' Buffalo and Susquehanna Railroad. Rogers and the Goodyear Brothers joined forces to create a company and plant in Buffalo that was called the Buffalo and Susquehanna Iron Company, named after the Goodyear brothers' Buffalo and Susquehanna Railroad.

Soon after, the Buffalo and Susquehanna Railroad, the Buffalo and Susquehanna Iron Company, the Pennsylvania Railroad, and the Lackawanna Steel Company jointly built a giant ship canal on the border of Buffalo and Lackawanna called the "Union Ship Canal." The canal, used by all parties, allowed room for steamships to bring in iron ore from Michigan and Minnesota to be reduced to pig iron. The Union Ship Canal's continued to be used as an industrial waterway until January 1982 with the closure of the Hanna Blast Furnace.

== Personal life ==
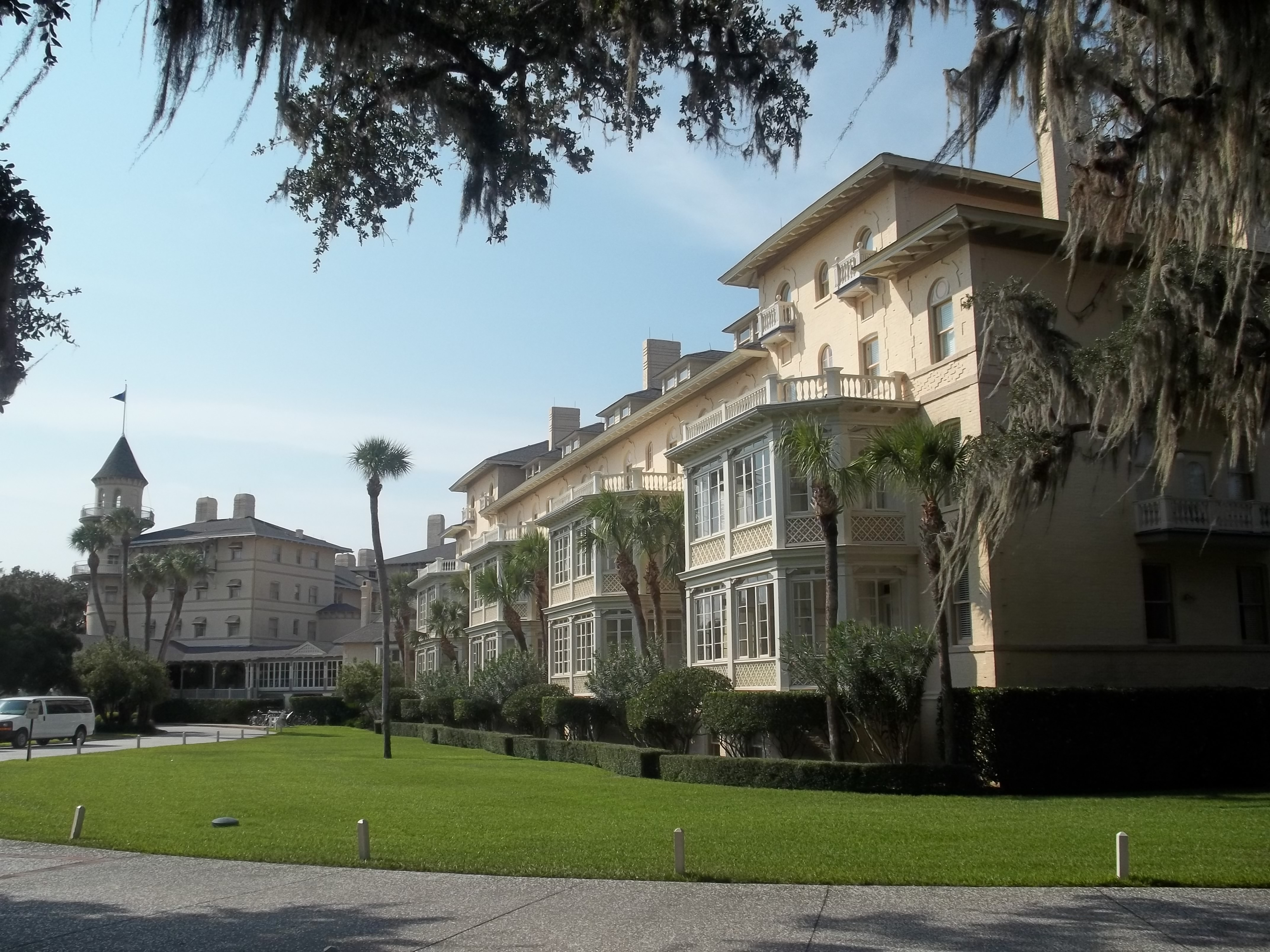
Jekyl Island Club

After moving to Buffalo, he was introduced to his business partner’s (George Field) sister in-law, Mary H. Warren whom he married in 1878. They did not have any children, collected art, and had an extensive library. For much of his later life, he was called "General Hayes," an honorary military title he acquired from the time he served as chief of the engineering division of New York State.

Hayes was a personal friend of Grover Cleveland, who made him a General in the National Guard while Cleveland was President. He was a member of the Jekyl Island Club, joining in 1886 and being a member until 1921.

Hayes died on October 19, 1923, and Mary died November 16, 1924.

=== Home ===
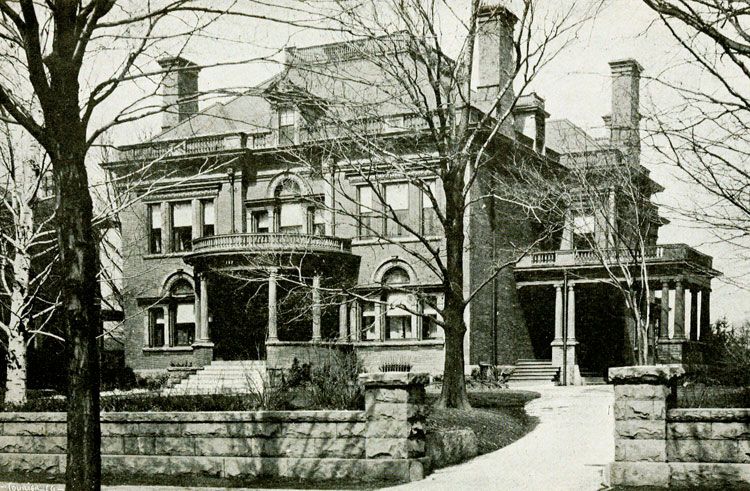
Hayes House, 147 North Street in 1892

In 1891–92, Hayes and his wife had Green & Wicks design a home for them at 147 North Street, two doors from the Metcalfe House (built in 1882 by McKim, Mead & White and demolished in 1980). The Hayes home was of yellow brick ("old gold") and "chocolate brown" contrast elements.

In 1922, the Hayes moved from their home and sold it to the University of Buffalo Alumni for $100,000 (equivalent to $1,923,000 in 2025) as their first clubhouse. The Alumni eventually sold the home to commercial interests and it was later demolished.

=== Philanthropy ===
Hayes served as a member of the University of Buffalo Council from 1920 to 1923, and left a bequest of $389,000 (equivalent to $7,351,000 in 2025) to the university upon his death. When the structure was remodeled for university use, the Hayes bequest was honored in naming the building Edmund B. Hayes Hall.

He served on the board of the Buffalo Fine Arts Academy and, in 1892, gave $5,000 (equivalent to $179,000 in 2025) to assist the school in offering classes. From 1915 until his death, he supplemented the academy's annual budget to cancel any debts.

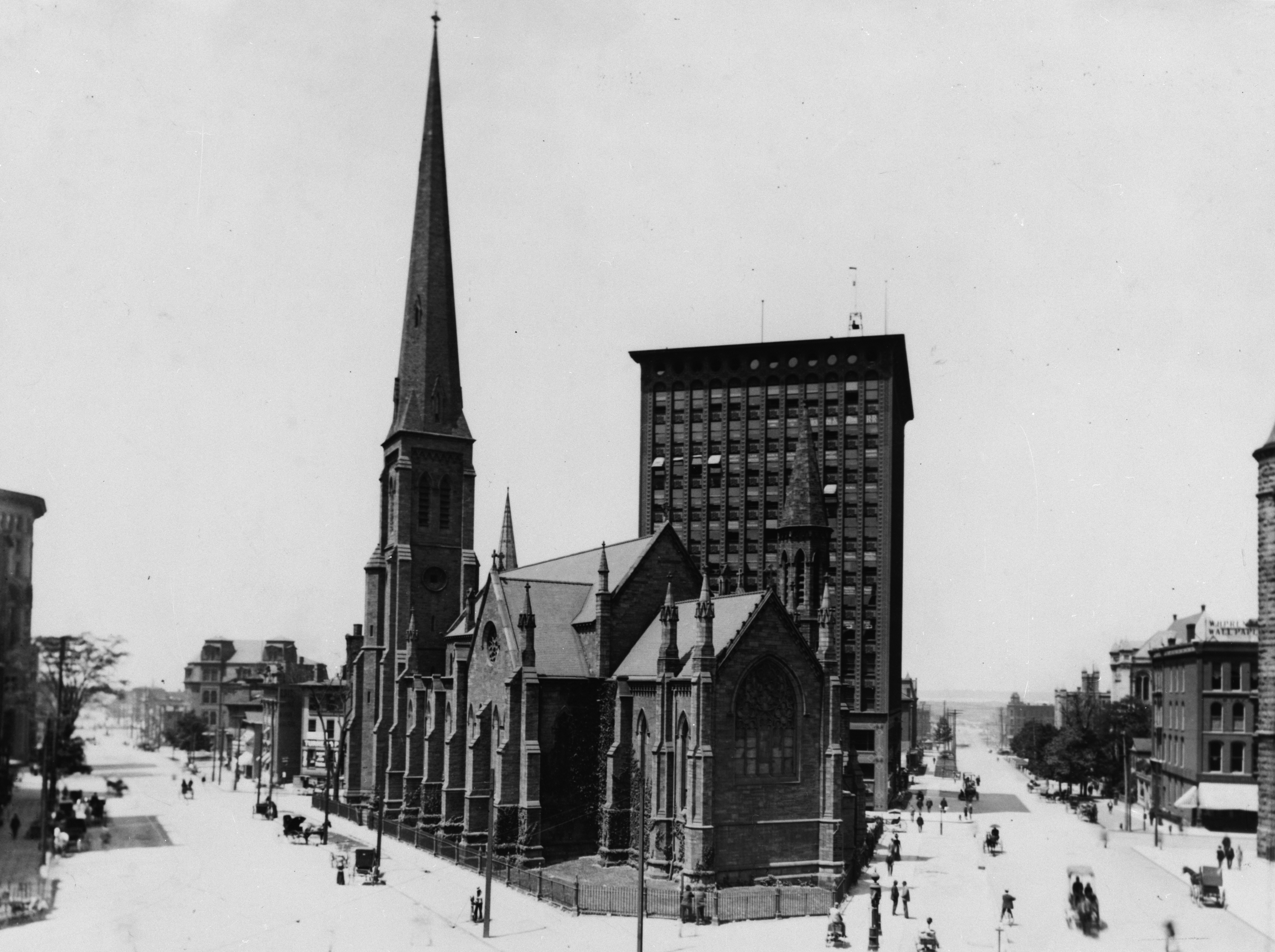
St. Paul's Episcopal Church in 1890

In 1906, when St. Paul's Episcopal Church was experiencing financial distress, he offered $50,000 (equivalent to $1,792,000 in 2025) to the church if others in the congregation would collectively match that total, which they did and therefore, was able to remain in Shelton Square. Hayes was the longest-serving vestryman, with 34 years service.

In 1913, when he attended the Dartmouth 40th reunion (of the class he would have graduated with), they presented him with a Master of Science degree. After he returned home, sent them a check for $10,000 (equivalent to $326,000 in 2025).

In 1923, when he died he left the following bequests:

- Artwork went to the Buffalo Fine Arts Academy, plus $75,000 (equivalent to $1,417,000 in 2025) for the future purchase of art.
- St. Paul's church received another $50,000 (equivalent to $945,000 in 2025)
- Buffalo General Hospital received $10,000 (equivalent to $189,000 in 2025)
- Children's Hospital, $10,000 (equivalent to $189,000 in 2025)
- Home for the Friendless, $5,000 (equivalent to $94,000 in 2025)
- The YMCA, $10,000 (equivalent to $189,000 in 2025)
- The Farmington, Maine Old South Church, $10,000 (equivalent to $189,000 in 2025)
- The Farmington Library, $20,000 (equivalent to $378,000 in 2025)

Upon his wife's death, the remainder of their estate was to be divided between the University of Buffalo and Dartmouth College.
