= Saugatuck River Bridge =

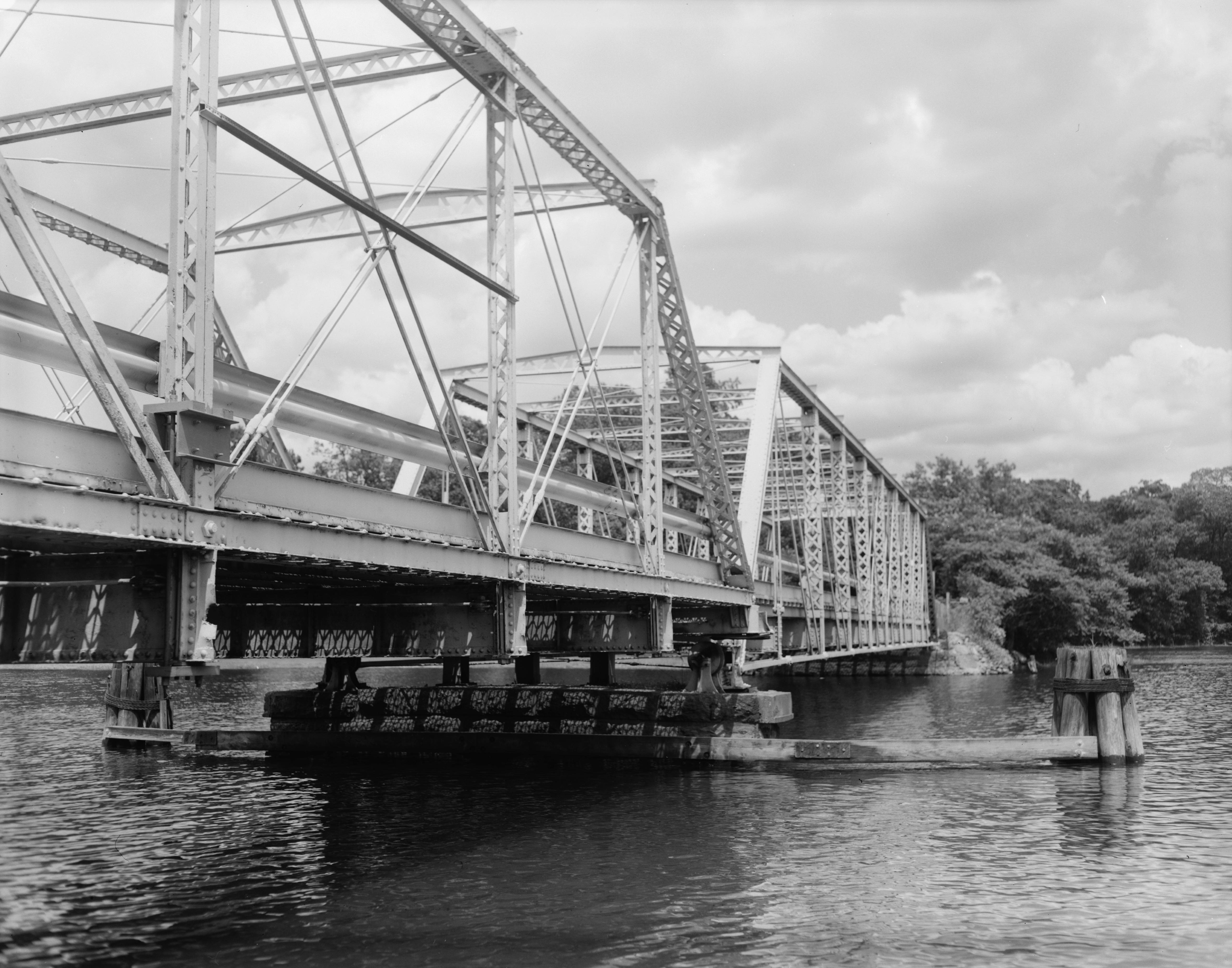
- Saugatuck River Bridge
- Coordinates: 41°7′22″N 73°22′10″W
- Carries: Route 136
- Crosses: Saugatuck River
- Locale: Westport, Connecticut
- Official name: Bridge No. 1349
- Maintained by: Connecticut Department of Transportation

Characteristics
- Design: Wrought-iron swing truss
- Total length: 289 feet (88 m)

History
- Construction end: 1884

Statistics
- Daily traffic: 15,700
- Saugatuck River Bridge
- U.S. National Register of Historic Places
- U.S. Historic district – Contributing property
- Area: less than one acre
- Built: 1884
- Architect: Union Bridge Co.
- Architectural style: Pin-connected swing bridge
- Part of: Bridge Street Historic District (ID100002318)
- NRHP reference No.: 87000126

Significant dates
- Added to NRHP: February 12, 1987
- Designated CP: April 19, 2018

Location
- Interactive map of Saugatuck River Bridge

The Saugatuck River Bridge is a bridge in Connecticut carrying Route 136 over the Saugatuck River in Westport. The bridge, built in 1884, is the oldest surviving movable bridge in Connecticut and is listed on the National Register of Historic Places. The total length of the bridge is 87.5 metres (287 ft) with a deck width of 6.1 metres (20 ft) and a minimum vertical clearance of 2.1 metres (6.9 ft) above the river. The bridge carries an average of about 16,000 vehicles per day. In 2007, the bridge was named the William F. Cribari Memorial Bridge.

== History ==
In 1746, a ferry was established to carry traffic over the Saugatuck River near Westport, and around 1807 it was replaced by the first bridge as part of the old Connecticut Turnpike. By 1857 the need to replace this bridge was apparent, and the town spent a total of $22,500 in 1869 to build a wooden bridge in its place. Within the ten years it took to pay that bridge off, shipworms had rendered it nearly impassable, and Westport had to build another bridge over the Saugatuck. Five years later, in 1884, the town contracted with Union Bridge Company of Buffalo, New York, to build a wrought iron bridge. Union Bridge Company, a leading but short-lived pioneer in swing bridge construction, was the only company to submit a bid for the job. The new bridge cost $26,700, not including $362 to remove the shipworm-infested remains of the 1869 wooden bridge. The bridge is the oldest surviving movable bridge in Connecticut.

The movable bridge allows waterborne traffic to easily pass, which was crucial to the area's economy at the time. The bridge consists of a 144-foot-long (44 m) fixed approach span on the eastern side, and a hand-cranked movable span. Both spans are pin-connected Pratt through truss designs made of wrought iron.

The bridge was listed on the National Register of Historic Places (NRHP) on February 12, 1987, as a rare example of an early movable iron bridge. The bridge spans were designed by Union Bridge Company president Charles Kellogg and his son Charles H. Kellogg. The bridge is also noted as being of significant importance in the historical development of the town of Westport in the 19th century, particularly in the area of maritime commerce. The importance of water-borne traffic required the town to spend additional effort and expense to build a bridge that would not inhibit such traffic.

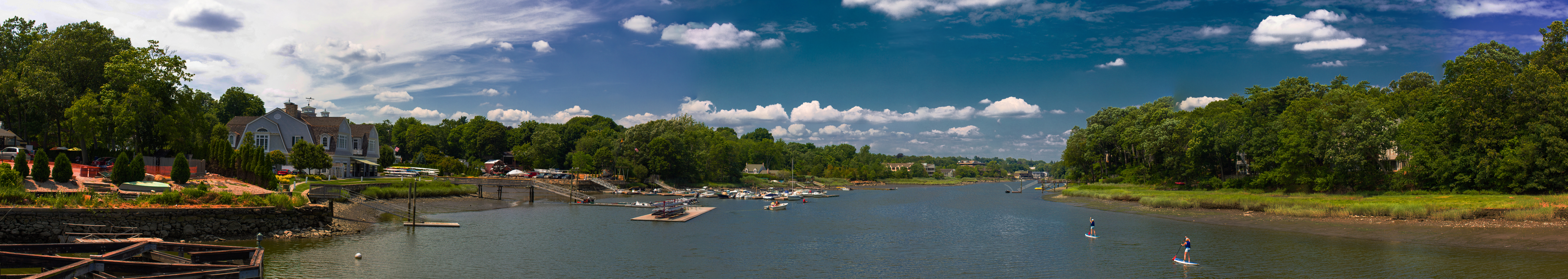
Panoramic view looking out from Saugatuck Bridge, Westport, CT, USA

== See also ==
- East Haddam Bridge, another swing bridge of similar design in Connecticut
- National Register of Historic Places listings in Fairfield County, Connecticut
- List of bridges documented by the Historic American Engineering Record in Connecticut
- List of bridges on the National Register of Historic Places in Connecticut
- List of movable bridges in Connecticut
