= Jackson Branch Bridge No. 15 =

- U.S. National Register of Historic Places
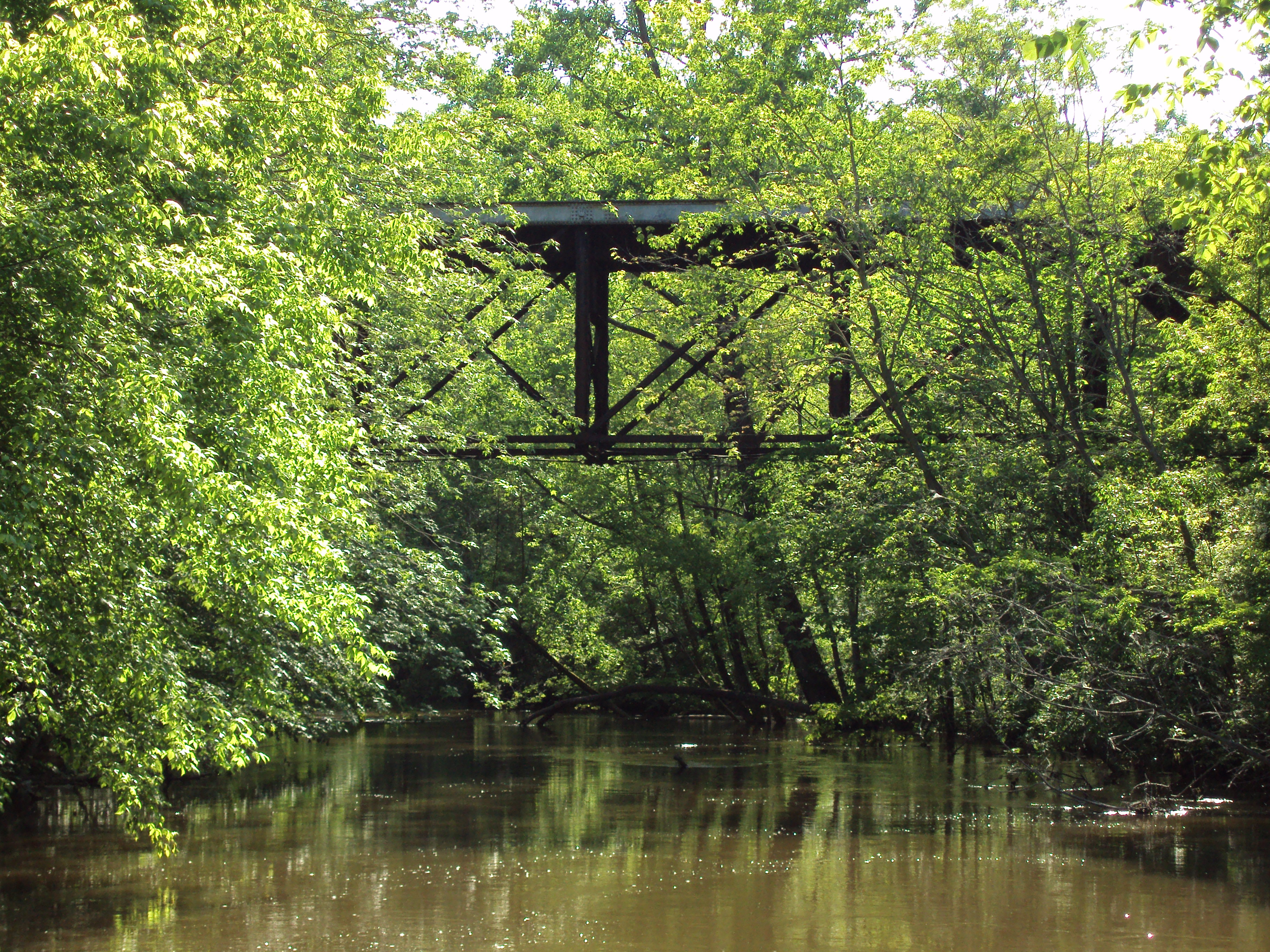

- Location within Michigan Location within the United States
- Interactive map
- Location: Crossing the River Raisin in Raisin Charter Township, Michigan
- Coordinates: 41°56′35″N 83°56′46″W
- Built: 1896
- Architect: Union Bridge Company, Detroit Bridge and Iron Works, Toledo Bridge Company
- Architectural style: Truss bridge
- NRHP reference No.: 01000572
- Added to NRHP: December 4, 2001

The Jackson Branch Bridge No. 15, also known as the Tecumseh Railroad Bridge due to its close proximity to the city of Tecumseh, is a historic railway deck truss bridge that spans the River Raisin in rural Raisin Charter Township in Lenawee County, Michigan. The bridge was added to the National Register of Historic Places on December 4, 2001.

== History ==
The Palmyra and Jacksonburgh Railroad was organized in the 1830s as a branch of the Erie and Kalamazoo Railroad. Both railroads failed in the late 1830s, and the lines were leased to the Michigan Southern Railway (later the Lake Shore and Michigan Southern Railway). In about 1890, the Lake Shore and Michigan Southern contracted the Union Bridge Company of Athens, Pennsylvania to fabricate trusses for a bridge on the original Erie & Kalamazoo line. In 1896, they reused these trusses, along with new steel plate girder spans were fabricated by the Detroit Bridge & Iron Works and the Toledo Bridge Company to fabricate this bridge.

The Lake Shore and Michigan Southern Railway was later absorbed into other railroads, and in 1982 Conrail abandoned the branch on which this bridge sits. The Southern Michigan Railroad Society purchased the Jackson Branch and the bridge in 1985, and operates historic trains on the bridge.

== Description ==
The 254-foot-10½-inch-long (77.7 m) four-span bridge carries a single track over the River Raisin. The railway sits 40 feet (12 m) above the river's surface. The closest road to the bridge is North Raisin Center Highway approximately 250 feet (76 m) east of the bridge. The area is heavily wooded, and the bridge cannot be seen from the roadway during the summer months. Access to the bridge is strictly prohibited, however it can be crossed via passenger train.

The bridge consists of a Pratt deck truss span 116 feet in length, with pinned connections and inclined end posts, spanning the river; along with two deck plate girder spans, each 44 feet in length, at one end; and a third deck plate girder span, 50 feet in length, at the other. The bridge is supported by ashlar abutments and piers. The bridge deck is 10 feet wide, and is constructed of 8X8 timbers.
