= Bridge Street Historic District (Westport, Connecticut) =

Historic district in Connecticut, United States

- U.S. National Register of Historic Places
- U.S. Historic district
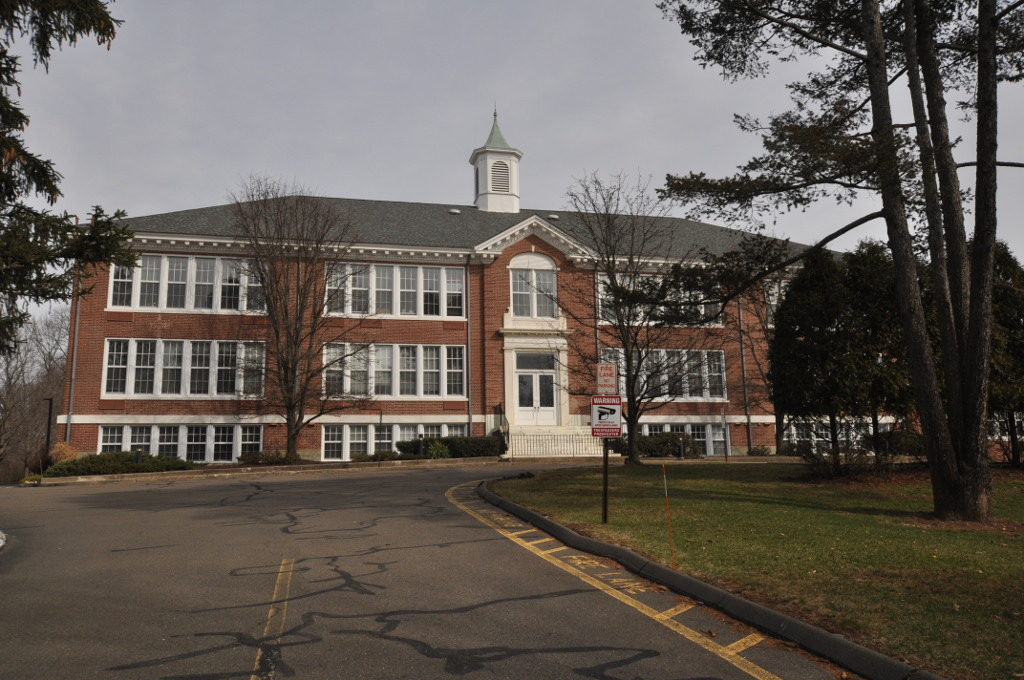
- Saugatuck Elementary School

- Location within Connecticut Location within the United States
- Location: Bridge Street, Imperial Avenue & Compo Road South, Westport, Connecticut
- Coordinates: 41°7′23″N 73°21′52″W
- Area: 22.46 acres (9.09 ha)
- Architectural style: Federal; Italianate; Queen Anne; Colonial Revival
- NRHP reference No.: 100002318
- Added to NRHP: April 19, 2018

The Bridge Street Historic District encompasses a largely residential stretch of Bridge Street (Connecticut Route 136) and adjacent Imperial Avenue in Westport, Connecticut. This area developed as a residential neighborhood in the 19th century, spurred in part by the 1869 construction of a bridge over the Saugatuck River (where the 1884 Saugatuck River Bridge now stands. The district includes a particularly fine collection of late 19th and early 20th century residential architecture. It was listed on the National Register of Historic Places in 2018.

== Description and history ==
The Bridge Street Historic District is a linear district, covering about 0.5 miles (0.80 km) of Bridge Street just east of the Saugatuck River, as well as a short stretch of Imperial Avenue, which runs north from Bridge Street. It includes the 1884 Saugatuck River Bridge, which connects Bridge Street to Saugatuck village, located on the west bank of the river. This area is almost entirely residential; the only non-residential building in the district is the Georgian Revival Saugatuck Elementary School (1931) located near the eastern end of the district. Most of the residences were built between about 1880 and 1920, with a few either pre-dating or post-dating this period. The oldest building in the district is the 1809 Delancey Allen House at Compo Road South and Bridge Street.

Navigation by road in early Westport was difficult due the lack of a bridge south of the one carrying the Boston Post Road (now United States Route 1) over the Saugatuck River. The Allen family, who owned land on the eastern bank of the river opposite the industrial village of Saugatuck, donated land for a bridgehead, and the first bridge was built on the site of a ferry crossing in 1869. That bridge, a wooden structure, was soon infested with a burrowing worm, and was replaced by the present swing bridge in 1884. The Allens also donated land for the construction of Bridge Street, provided the town built a fences or stone walls (some of which survive in the landscape) to separate the road from their remaining landholdings. Members of the Allen family then began selling off parcels for residential development.

== See also ==
- National Register of Historic Places listings in Fairfield County, Connecticut
