= Union Bridge Company =

The Union Bridge Company was a bridge fabricator and contractor with works in Buffalo, New York, (believed closed in 1890 per HAER references) and Athens, Pennsylvania. The Union Bridge company was formed in 1884 as a merger of several other bridge-building firms. Partners included George S. Field of Buffalo, Edmund B. Hayes of Buffalo, Charles MacDonald of New York City, Thomas C. Clarke of Seabright, NY and Charles Stewart Maurice of Athens, PA.

== History ==
Kellogg, Clarke & Co. was formed in 1869 by Thomas C. Clarke and Charles Kellogg, with the backing of Samuel Reeves of the "Phoenix Iron Works" of Phoenixville, Pennsylvania. In 1871, Kellogg left to form his own company and Clarke and Reeves formed "Clarke, Reeves & Co." In 1884, "Clarke, Reeves & Co." became the "Phoenix Bridge Company." In the same year, Clarke and Charles Macdonald formed the Union Bridge Company by merger of the "Central Bridge Company" of Buffalo, New York and Kellogg and Maurice of Athens, Pennsylvania.

In 1900, The Union Bridge Company was purchased by the American Bridge Company in a consolidation of 24 US bridge building companies.

A company with the same name, chartered in 1873, was involved in a US Supreme Court case in 1907 involving compliance with a law giving the Secretary of War the authority to order removal of obstructions to navigation on rivers and waterways. It is not yet clear if this is the same company or not.

== Notable projects ==
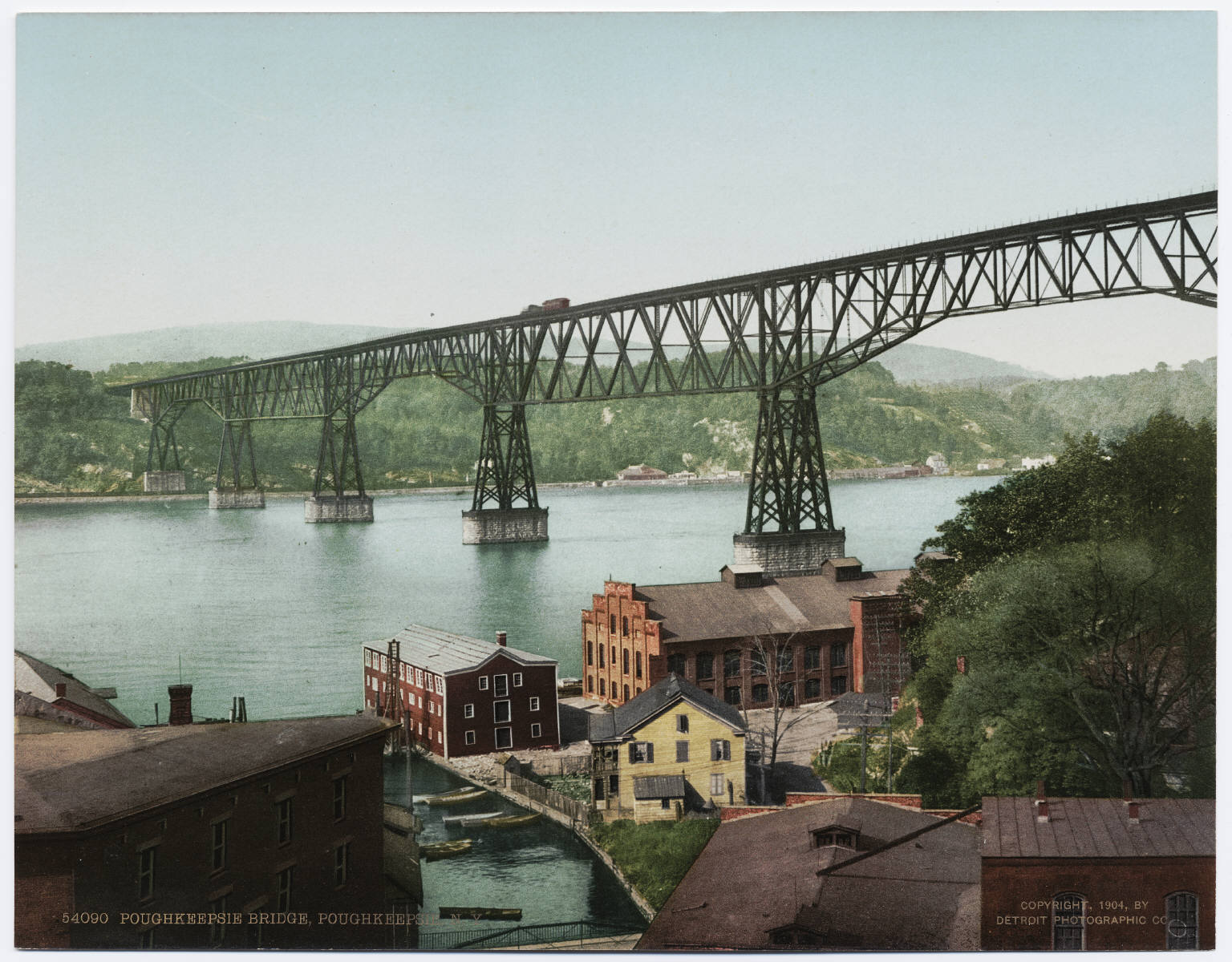
Poughkeepsie Bridge in 1900

- Hawkesbury River Railway Bridge, NSW Central Coast near Sydney, Australia (1889)
- Niagara Cantilever Bridge (1883)
- Poughkeepsie Bridge (1889)
- Coraopolis Bridge (1927)
- Pasco-Kennewick Bridge (1922)
- Provo River Railroad Bridge (1884) (small through truss bridge, notable for having been disassembled, reused as a shorter bridge, then disassembled and reused as a still shorter bridge)
- Winona Railroad Bridge (1891)
- Saugatuck River Bridge (1884) Connecticut swing bridge. Hand cranked. Claimed oldest extant movable bridge in Connecticut. Listed on the National Register of Historic Places (NRHP)
- Cairo Bridge over the Ohio
- Memphis Bridge over the Mississippi

Not by date:

- Big Creek Bridge No. 01180, OR Coast 9, US 101, MP175.02 Heceta Head, OR, listed on the National Register of Historic Places (NRHP)
- Jackson Branch Bridge No. 15, Southern Michigan RR over River Raisin Raisin Township, MI, NRHP-listed
- One or more works in Otowi Historic District, 25 mi. N of Santa Fe, on NM 4 in Rio Grande Valley Santa Fe, NM, NRHP-listed
- Poughkeepsie Railroad Bridge, Spans Hudson River Poughkeepsie, NY, NRHP-listed
- Ten Mile Creek Bridge No. 01181, OR Coast 9, US101, MP171.44 Yachats, OR, NRHP-listed
