= William Allen Rogers =

American cartoonist

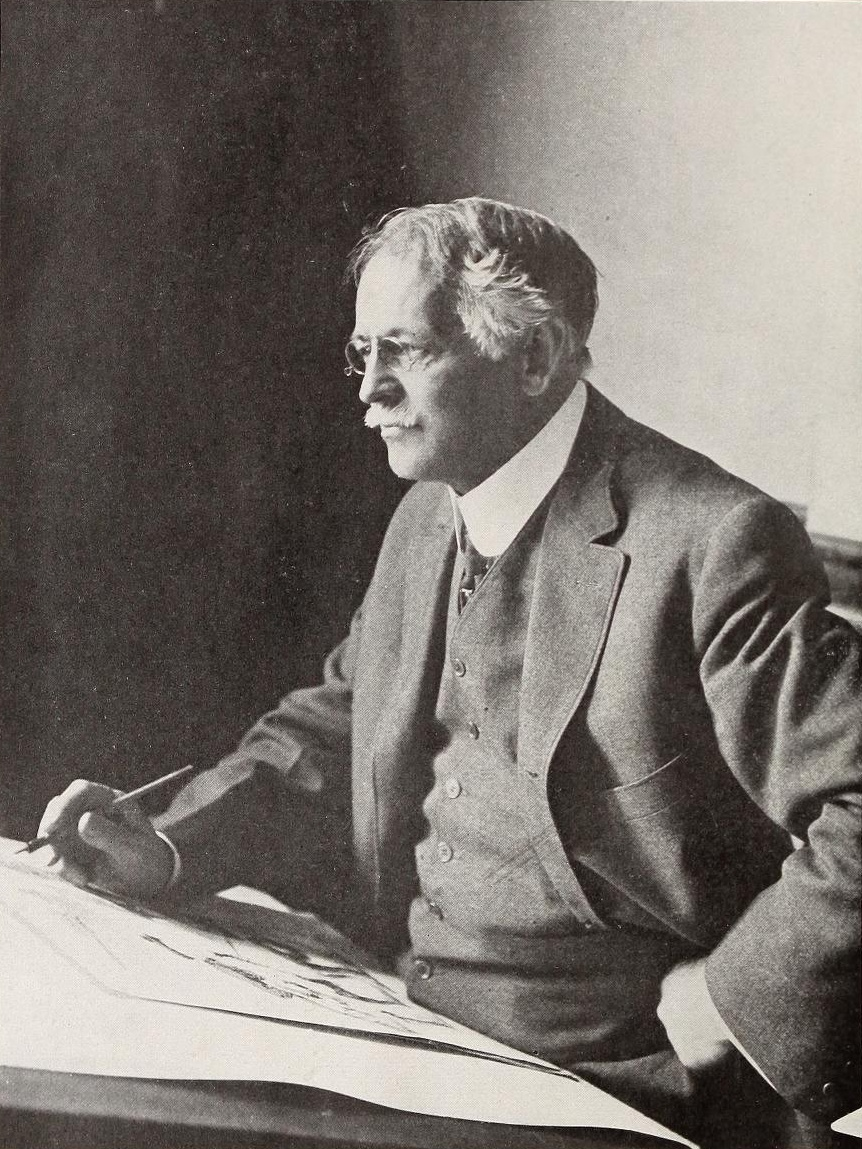
- Rogers c. 1917
- Born: 1854 Springfield, Ohio, United States
- Died: 1931 (aged 76–77) Washington, D.C.
- Area: Cartoonist

Signature
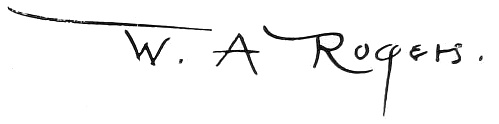

William Allen Rogers (1854–1931) was an American political cartoonist born in Springfield, Ohio.

== Biography ==
He studied at the Worcester Polytechnic Institute and Wittenberg College, but never graduated. Rogers taught himself to draw and began submitting political cartoons to Midwestern newspapers in his teens. At the age of fourteen, his first cartoons appeared in a Dayton, Ohio-based newspaper, to which Rogers' mother had earlier submitted a selection of his sketches.

The start of Rogers' career as an illustrator came in 1873 when he was hired by the Daily Graphic in New York. He was nineteen years old at the time. Rogers' job at the Daily Graphic was to help out with the news sketches and at times draw cartoons.

In 1877, he was hired by Harper's Weekly to draw the magazine's political cartoons after the departure of Thomas Nast. The cartoons were dramatic adjuncts that illustrated the magazine's editorials. Walt Reed, author of The Illustrator in America: 1860–2000, writes that while Rogers cartoons "never quite approached Nast's in power, his ideas were strongly presented and his drawings somewhat more skillful." Rogers remained at Harper's Weekly for twenty-five years, and lived in St. George, Staten Island.

After leaving Harper's Weekly, Rogers was hired by the New York Herald, where he drew cartoons daily for a total of twenty years. He occasionally worked for Life too, and submitted cartoons and illustrations for Puck, The Century Magazine, and St. Nicholas Magazine.

Rogers retired as a cartoonist in 1926 while working for the Washington Post. He died in Washington, D.C., in 1931.

== Gallery ==
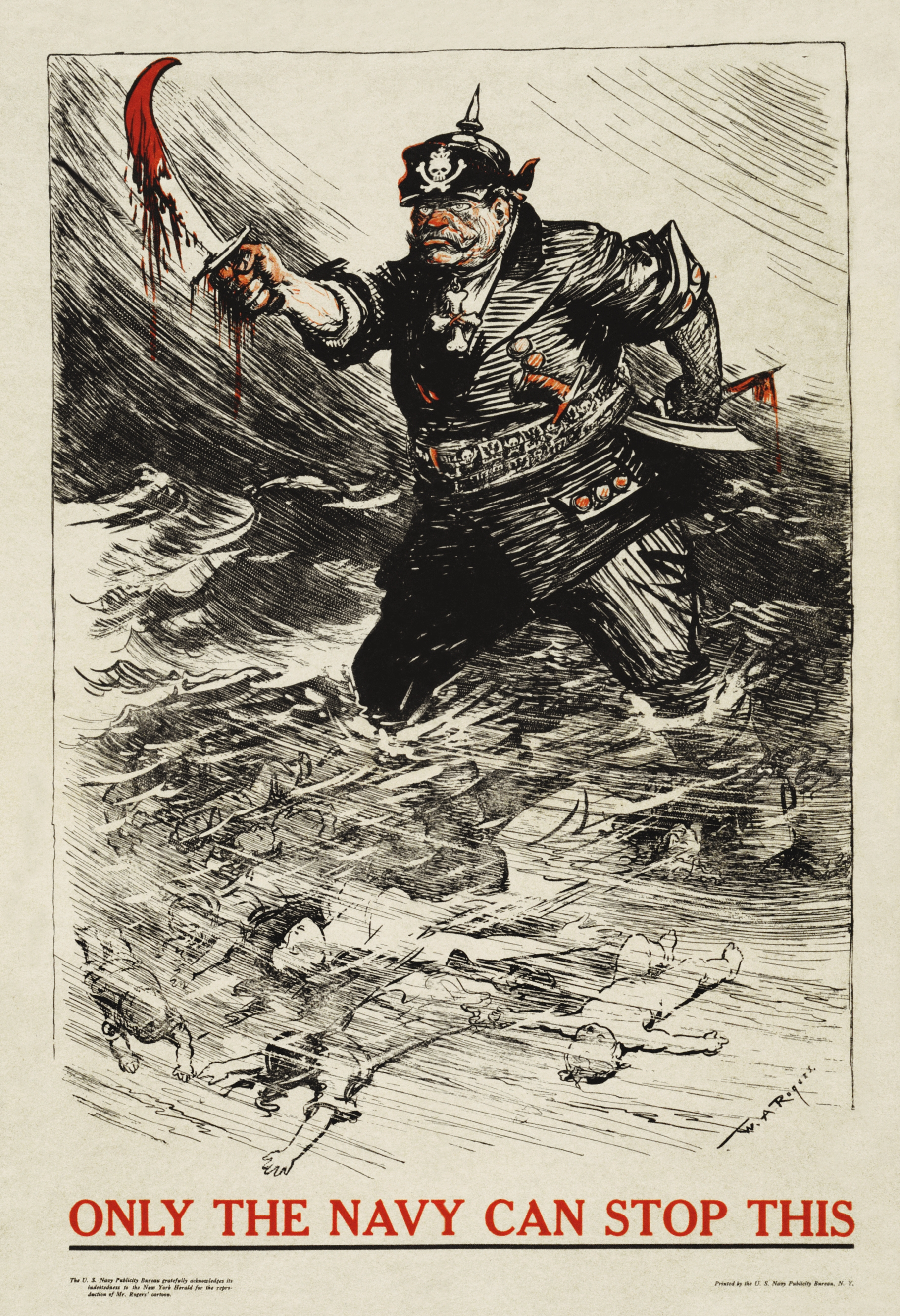
World War I United States Navy recruitment poster using one of Rogers's cartoons for the New York Herald.

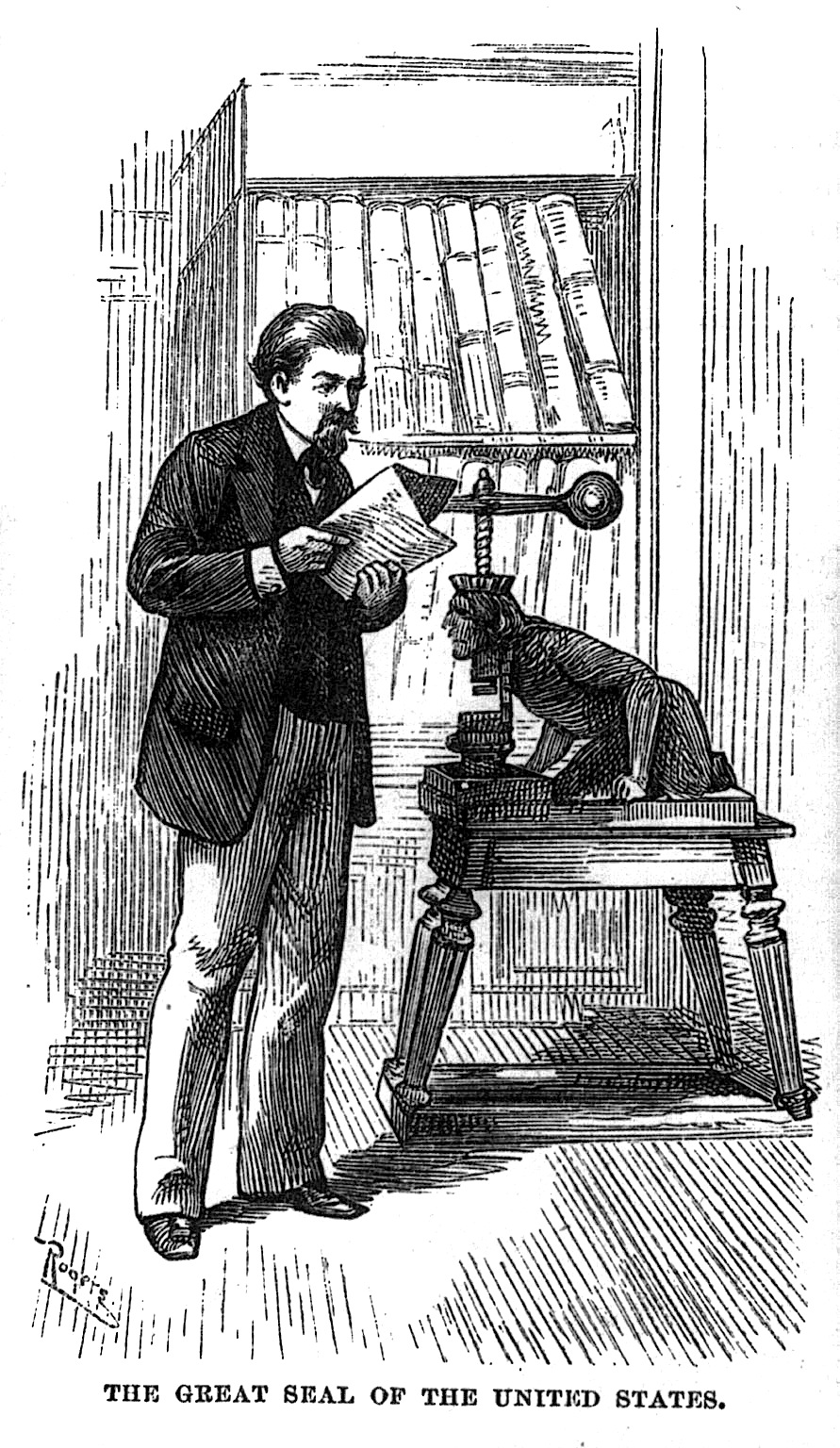
George Bartle, who was the seal caretaker from 1852–99, for the March 1878 Harper’s Magazine

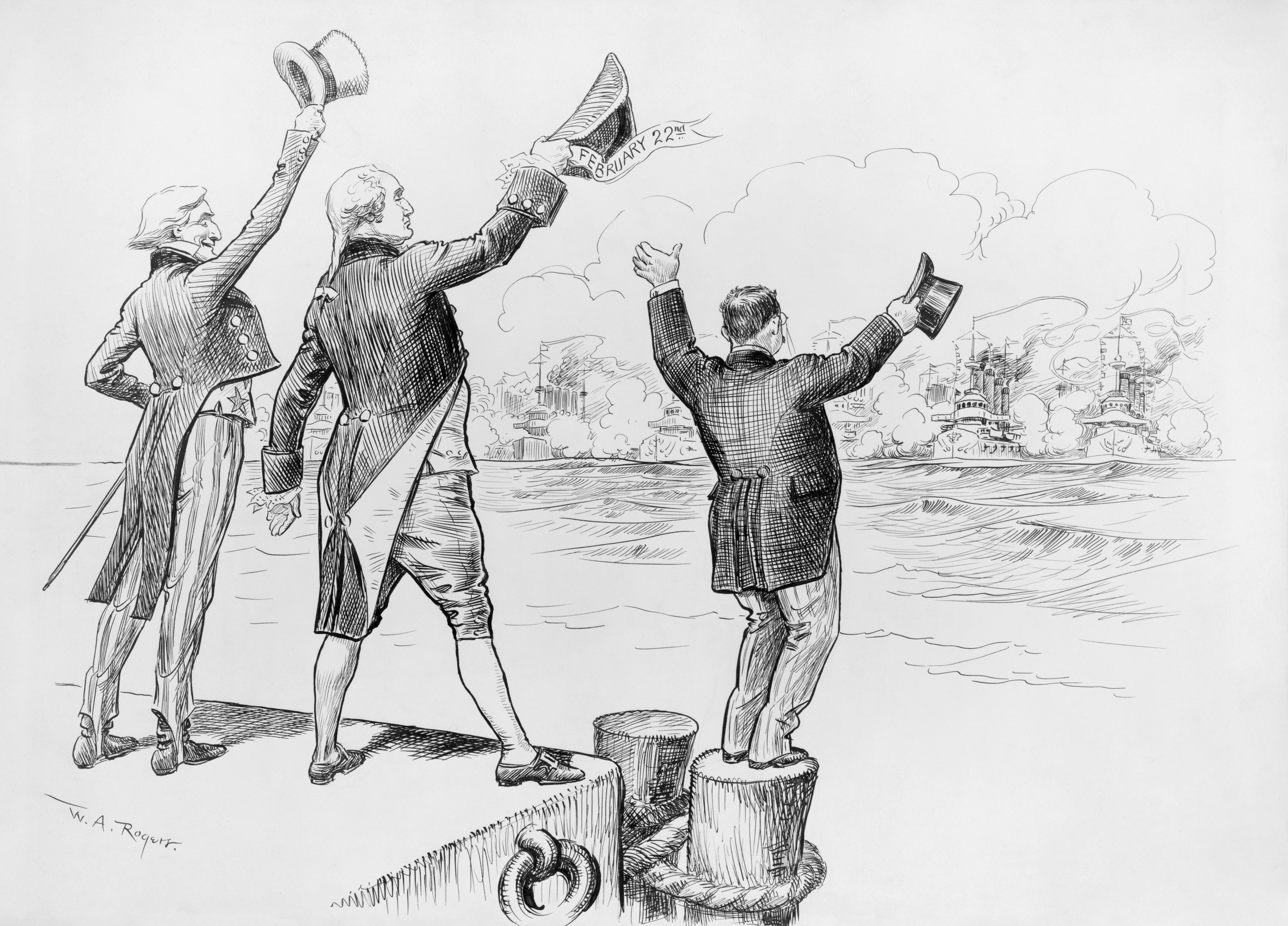
"Return of the Great White Fleet". The cartoon appeared in the New York Herald on February 22, 1909

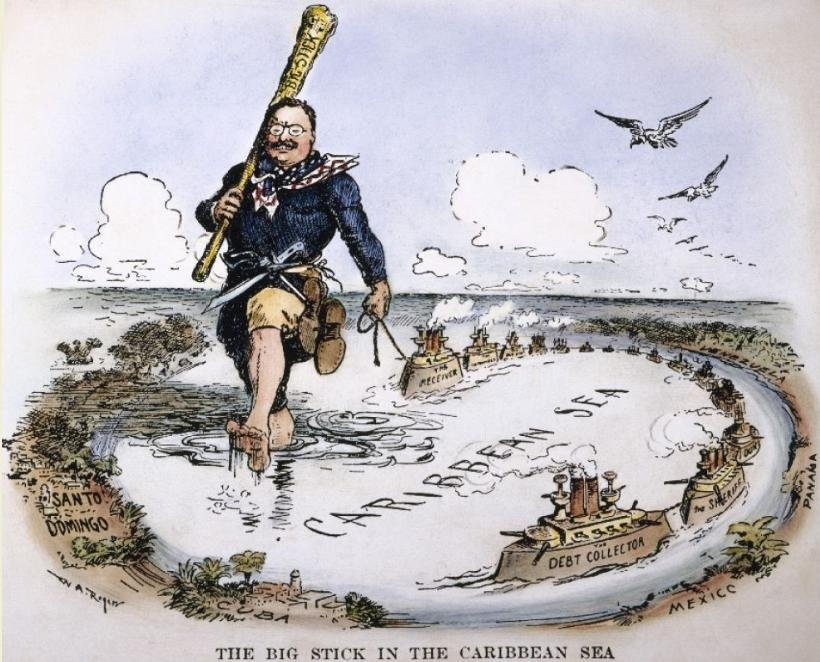
1904 cartoon recreates the Big Stick Diplomacy of Theodore Roosevelt as an episode in Gulliver's Travels
