= On the Banks of the Wabash, Far Away =

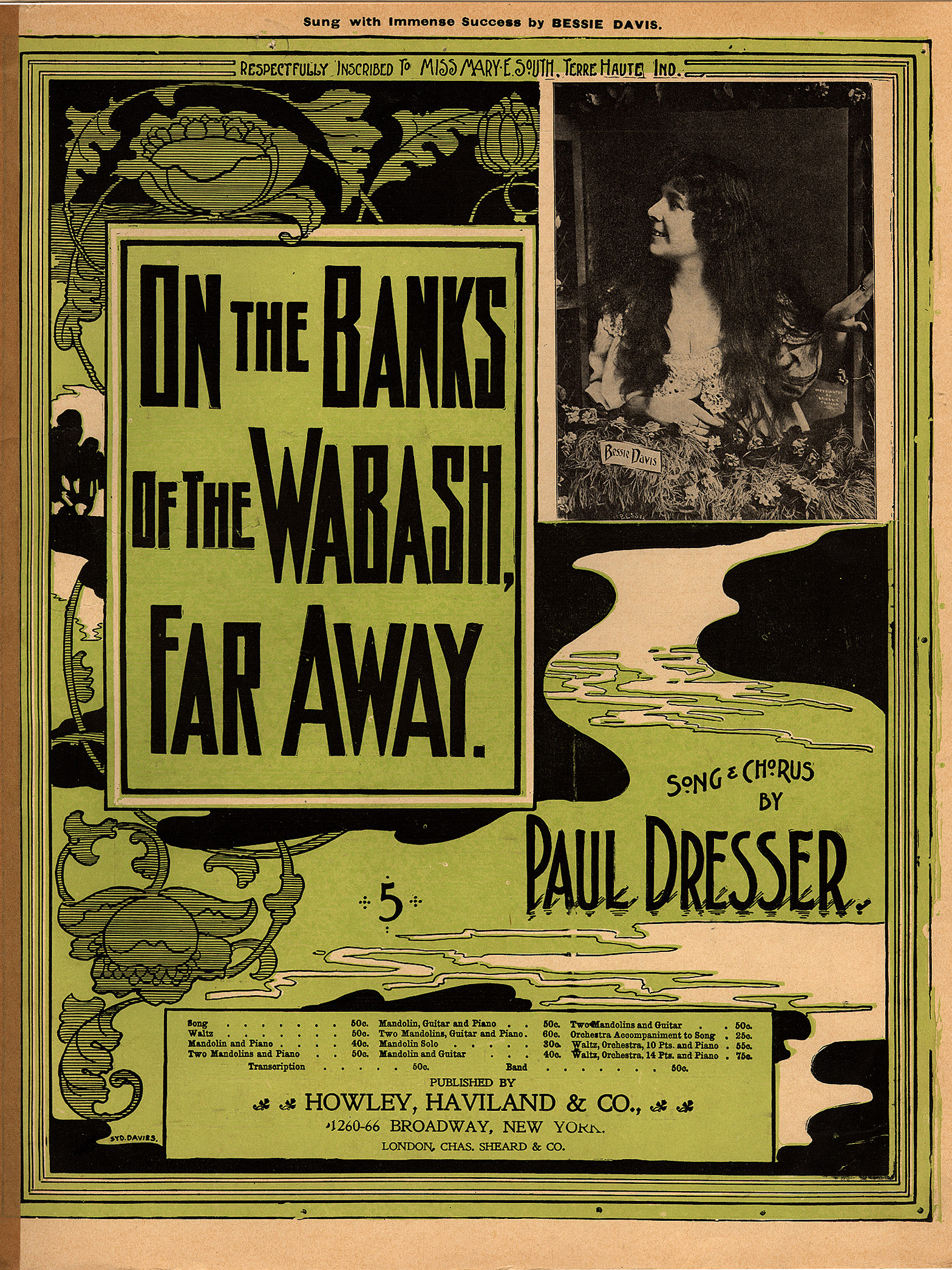
- Sheet music cover (1897)

Song by Paul Dresser
- Published: Howley, Haviland & Co., October 1897
- Genre: Tin Pan Alley Mother-and-Home songs
- Songwriter: Paul Dresser

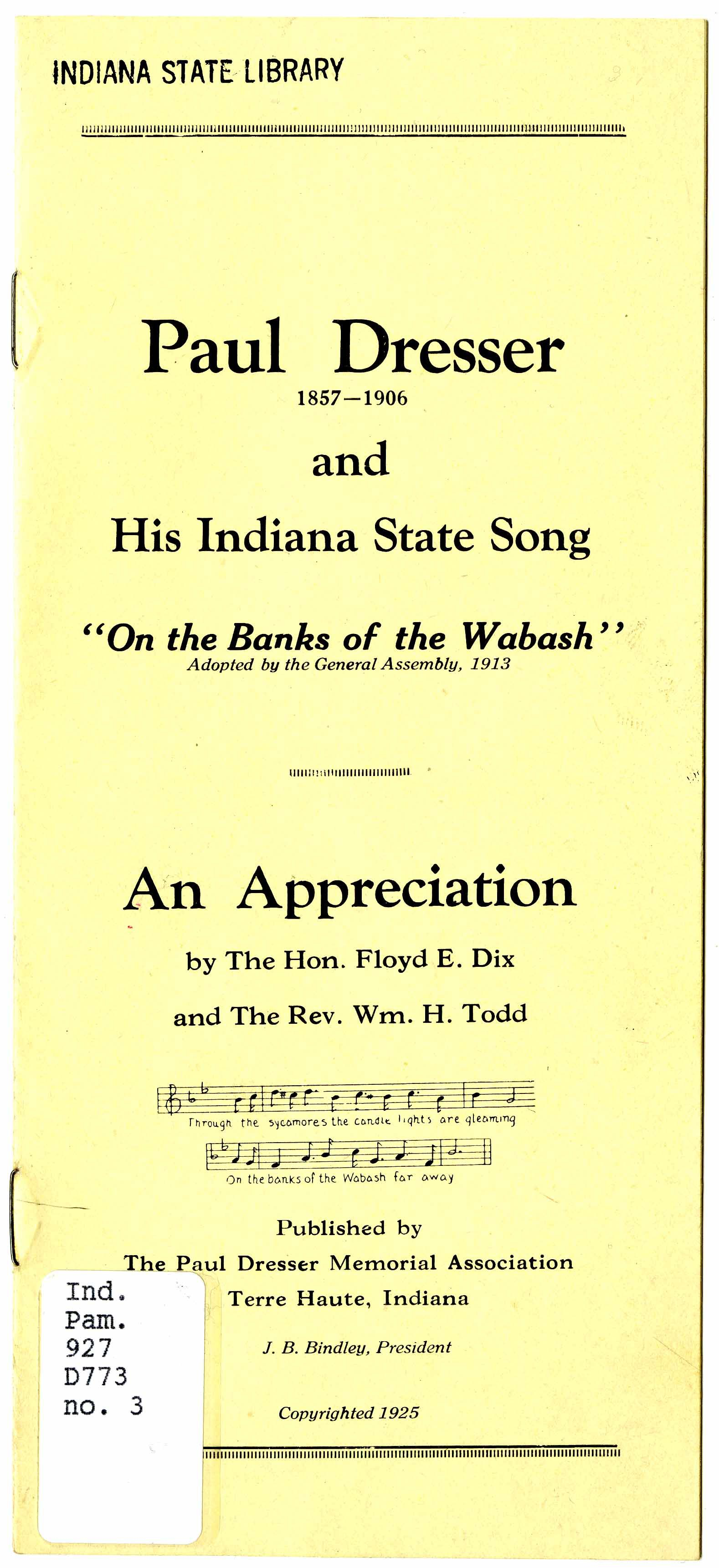
This pamphlet contains the texts of two speeches given before the Ways and Means Committee of the House of Representatives of the State of Indiana: The speech of Floyd E. Dix delivered February 4, 1925 and the speech of Rev. William H. Todd delivered February 4, 1924.

"On the Banks of the Wabash, Far Away" is a song written and composed by the American songwriter Paul Dresser in 1897. It is among the best-selling songs of the 19th century, earning over $100,000 from sheet-music revenues. Written and composed by American songwriter Paul Dresser, it was published by the Tin Pan Alley firm of Howley, Haviland and Company in October 1897. The lyrics of the ballad reminisce about life near Dresser's childhood home by the Wabash River in Indiana, United States. The song remained popular for decades, and the Indiana General Assembly adopted it as the official state song on March 14, 1913. The song was the basis for a 1923 film of the same title. Its longtime popularity led to the emergence of several lyrical versions, including an 1898 anti-war song and a Swedish version that was a number-one hit.

The song was composed during a transitory time in musical history when songs first began to be recorded for the phonograph. It was among the earliest pieces of popular music to be recorded. Dresser's inability to control the distribution of phonograph cylinders led him and his company to join other composers to petition the United States Congress to expand federal copyright protections over the new technology.

Dresser's ballad was the subject of some controversy after his death in 1906. His younger brother, novelist Theodore Dreiser, publicly claimed to have authored part of the song, but the validity of his claim was never proven. The ambiguity of United States copyright laws at the time and the poor management of Dresser's estate left the song vulnerable to plagiarism. The 1917 song "Back Home Again in Indiana" borrowed heavily from Dresser's song, both lyrically and musically, and led to a dispute with Dresser's estate that was never resolved.

== Background and composition ==
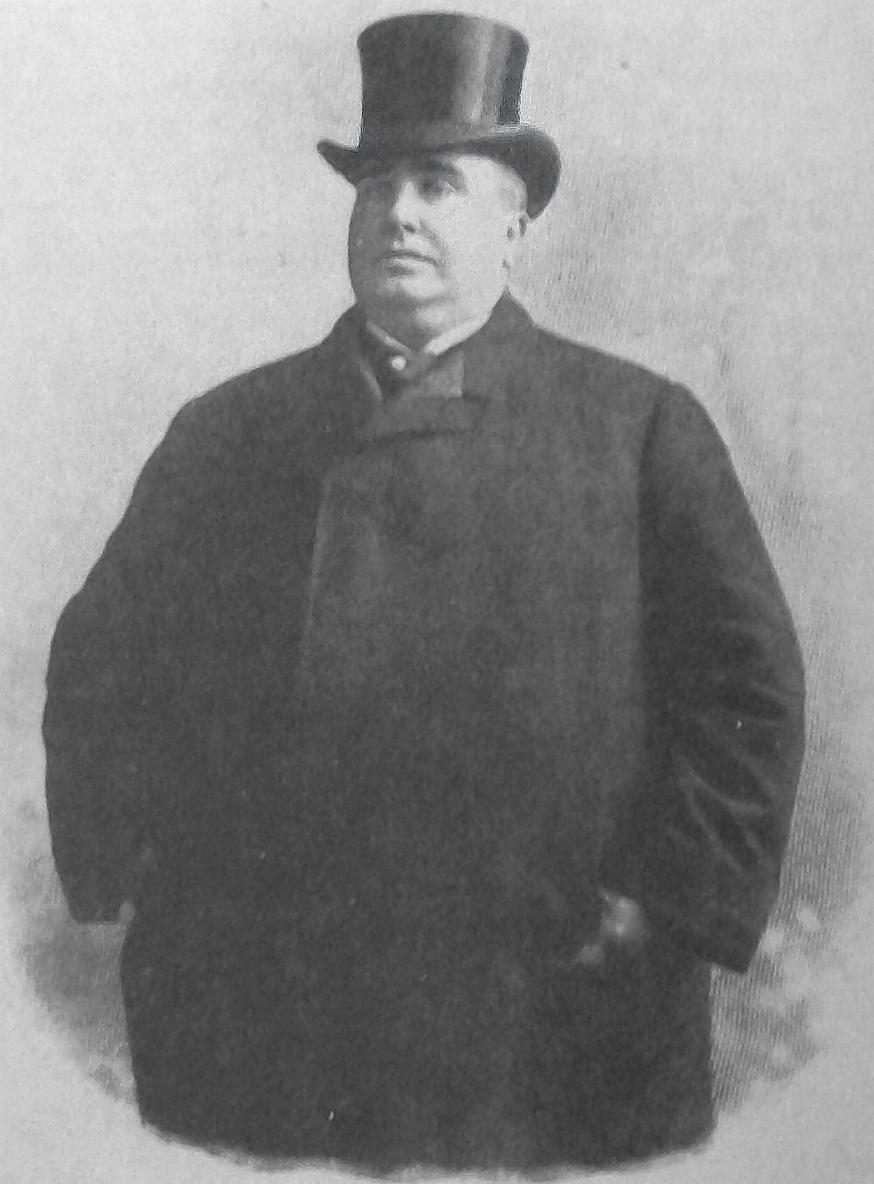
Paul Dresser, c. 1897

Paul Dresser, a prominent 19th-century lyricist and music composer, was born in Terre Haute, Indiana. (Note: Paul changed the spelling of his last name from "Dreiser" to "Dresser" to Americanize it after beginning his entertainment career. (Loving, p. 12)) Dresser’s boyhood home was near land adjacent to the Wabash River, the primary internal waterway in the state of Indiana. He later became a traveling musician, comedian, and actor who also composed music for the acts. In 1893 Dresser joined Howley, Haviland and Company, a Tin Pan Alley music publisher based in New York City, as a silent partner. In 1896, after more than twenty years of traveling the country as a performer, Dresser grew tired of the theater and turned his attention to composing music and his music publishing business. By that time Dresser was a nationally known talent who had traveled throughout the United States. While he occasionally returned to Terre Haute for performances and brief visits, Dresser's songs and letters to his friends often reminisced about Indiana and his childhood home.

Dresser officially dedicated the song to fourteen-year-old Mary South, a native of Terre Haute, whom he had never met. The second verse of "Wabash" contains reference to "Mary", but Dresser told a reporter that the name was "fictitious" and used only for "rhythmical purposes", and denied that the inspiration for the name came from a girl he once courted in his youth. When asked what led him to write the song Dresser said, "The same sweet memory that inspired that other Hoosier, James Whitcomb Riley, to sing of the 'Old Swimmin' Hole' ... I was born on the banks of the Wabash at Terre Haute ... My fondest recollections are of my mother and of my early days along this stream."

In the first half of 1897 Dresser began to write the song "On the Banks of the Wabash, Far Away" in remembrance of his Indiana home. He tended to compose songs over the course of months, usually in private during the evening hours. He refined his songs by playing the melody repeatedly, making changes and altering notes until it reached his satisfaction. It is believed that Dresser began "Wabash" in New York City in April 1897; continued working on it in May, when he was on vacation at West Baden Springs, Indiana; and completed the ballad in Chicago, while staying at the Auditorium Hotel in the summer of 1897.

== Release ==
It is believed that the song's first public performance took place at the Alhambra Theater in Milwaukee, Wisconsin, probably in June 1897. After "professional copies" (printed samples of the sheet music) of the song were released in July, the final version was published in October as part of a series of "mother-and-home" songs. To spur interest in the song, Howley, Haviland and Company, the song's publisher, distributed 5,000 copies of the sheet music to singers, musicians, theaters, and other musical venues in the month after the song was released. Restaurants, theaters, and street musicians were paid to play the song, while handbills with the lyrics were distributed when the song was performed publicly to help listeners to quickly learn the song. Using the nationwide network of music distribution controlled by Tin Pan Alley, Dresser's publishing company was able to have the song well advertised, which pushed sales on a large scale.

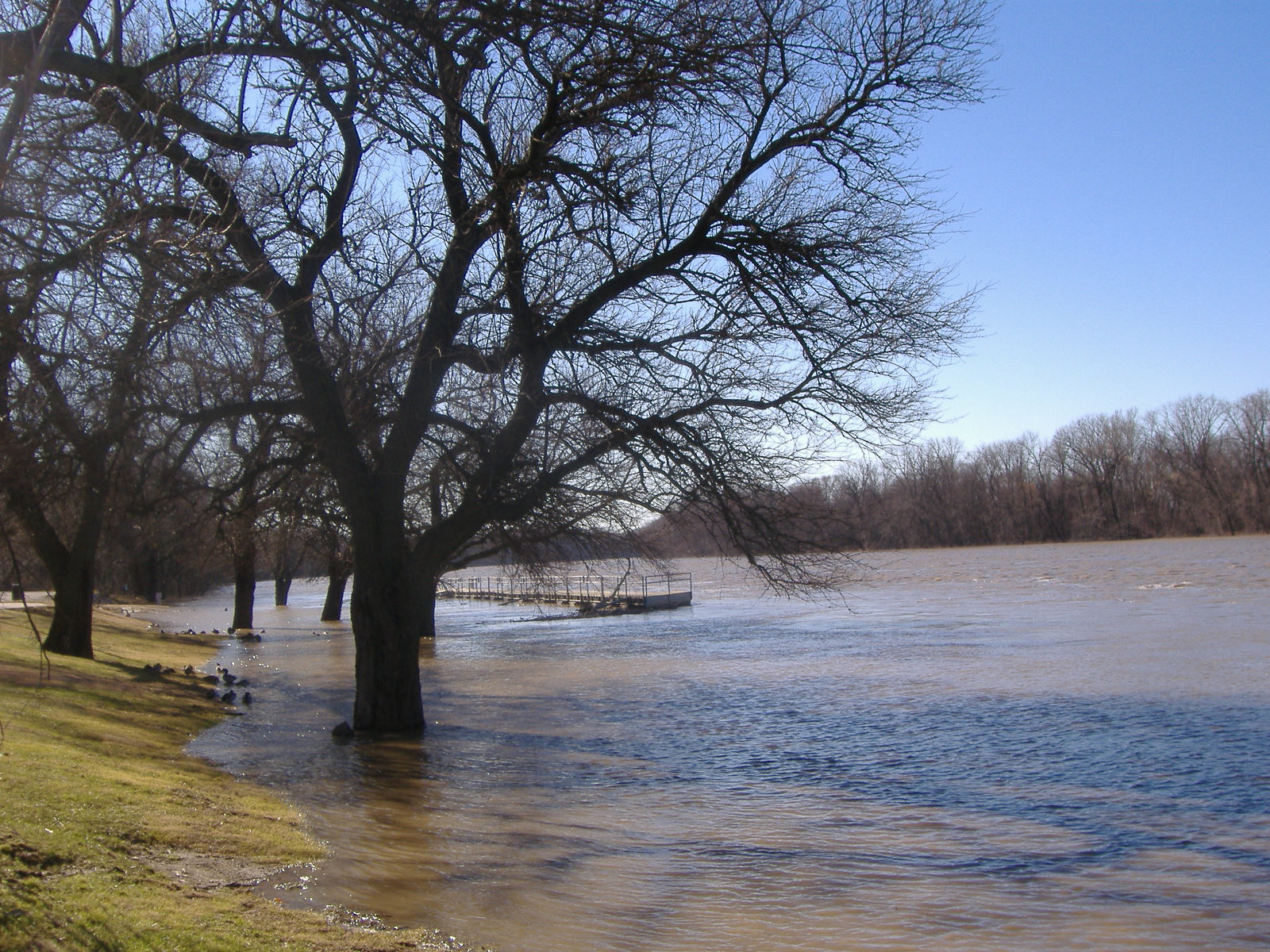
The Wabash River by Paul Dresser's family home

"Wabash" became an immediate success. One Chicago department store claimed to have sold 1,471 copies of the song in a single day. In its first year, over 500,000 copies of sheet music for the song were sold.

Dresser's biographer, Clayton Henderson, attributed the success of the song to the "perfect marriage of words and music." An Indiana newspaper compared the song in popularity to "Swanee River" and wrote, "Mr. Dresser ... has endeavored to perpetuate the beauties of the Wabash as did Stephen Foster that of the Suwannee River, and certainly no song since the latter has awakened so much interest among lovers of a good song, nor has any other American author seemed as capable of filling the void left vacant by Foster. The song is a gem and a welcome relief from some of the so-called popular songs sprung on the public from time to time."

One example attesting to the widespread popularity of Dresser's song occurred in June 1900, when the lighting failed at the Coney Island arena during a prize fight between Terry McGovern and Tommy White. The announcer calmed the panicking crowd of 5,000 by whistling the tune of "On the Banks of the Wabash" and the crowd began to sing along in the dark until the lighting was repaired.

By the end of 1898 Dresser reported that nearly one million copies of sheet music would soon be sold, making "Wabash" a "sensation", the "great hit of the day." In a newspaper interview for The Indianapolis Star, Dresser said, "I can't tell you just how much I have cleared off of the song, but the $50,000 estimate I have seen in some papers is very modest. You see, I am a publisher, as well as a composer, and have a big printing house of my own in New York. I also write the words for all my songs, dictate the circumstances and stage settings for their public introductions, write my own ads, and sometimes sing my own songs. Now what do you think of that for a monopoly, eh?" Dresser earned a substantial income from the song, including royalties through the sale of sheet music.

The music industry was in a period of transition at the time the song was published as new technologies allowed music to be recorded. U.S. copyright laws at the time did not allow music composers to control the distribution of phonograph cylinders or music rolls for player pianos. Edison Records paid popular singers like Harry Macdonough to sing the songs and then sold the recordings without paying any royalties to the composer or publisher of the music. Dresser joined with other prominent composers to seek a change in U.S. copyright laws. In 1902 Dresser met with U.S. senators and the Secretary of State in Washington, D.C. He also submitted papers with the U.S. State Department asking for an extension of copyright protection outside the United States, especially in Canada and England.

== Later years ==
By 1900 "Wabash" had sold millions of copies, becoming the best selling song of its time in terms of sheet music sold. The ballad remained popular during the 1920s, becoming a staple song in many singing acts, including male quartet performances. In addition, J. Stuart Blackton directed a 1923 silent film of the same title that was based partially on the song's lyrics. The song appears in the W. C. Fields comedy Man on the Flying Trapeze (1935), in which the house owner Fields, two thieves who broke into his house and the arresting policeman sing the song together. It had appeared in an earlier film of Fields’ It’s a Gift (1934), sung by The Avalon Boys in an auto camp where Fields was staying. The song was also featured prominently in the 1942 film My Gal Sal, the title of another song by Dresser.

The Mills Brothers released a performance of the song in 1943.

Bing Crosby included the song in a medley on his album Join Bing and Sing Along (1959).

== Lyrics and analysis ==
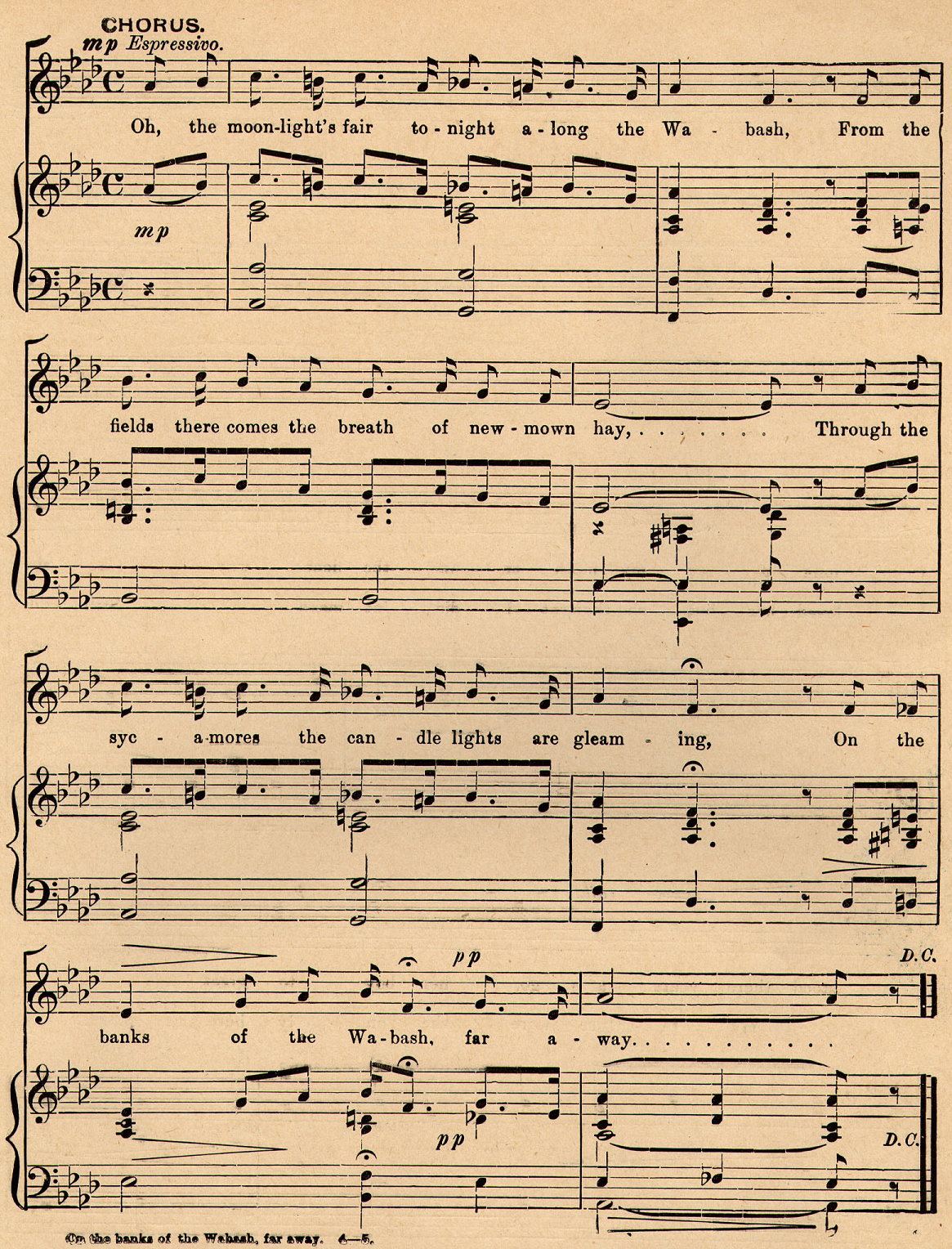
The sheet music to the chorus

The ballad speaks of the Wabash River, which flows through Indiana, and reminisces about events that occurred there. The song has two verses and a chorus. The first verse is about the narrator's childhood on a farm and his love for his mother. The second verse is about his lost love, Mary. While the subjects of the verses are connected, the narrative of the chorus is detached from the verses as it seemingly reminisces nostalgically.

Without speaking directly of death, both verses indicate the absence of a loved one, and the narrator's sadness and inability to cope with the grief. In the second verse, the narrator cannot bring himself to come near to his lost love's grave. The effort to avoid the subject of death and the focus on fond memories is typical of songs and societal sensibilities at the time.

The melody of the song is a memorable tune made easy to learn because of its combination of harmonic repetition and contrast—elements that make music easy to remember while avoiding monotony. The recurrence and dissimilarity within the melody is similar to the patterns in many popular folk songs. Dresser, however, avoided the common 19th-century practice of using a portion of the refrain's melody in the verse. With little formal training in music theory, it is unlikely that Dresser purposefully made any methodical calculations when he composed the melody.

Written for piano, guitar, and mandolin, the music begins in the key of G major with an Andante Moderato tempo. The verses follow a chord progression of G–C–G. The chorus transitions to B minor, and progresses as B–E–E, before returning to G–C–G in its final bars. Although the melody of the chorus is unique within the piece, it is in harmonic unity with the verses. An upbeat version played at a Andantino tempo was also adapted for play by small orchestras and big bands.

"On the Banks of the Wabash, Far Away" (1997)
30-second sample (chorus) by Rufus Wainwright from the soundtrack to the 1997 film The Myth of Fingerprints

"On the Bank of the Wabash, Far Away" (1902)
A c. 1902 recording of the song by Paul Dresser, sung by Harry MacDonough, published by Edison Records

On the Banks of the Wabash, Far Away
(Verse)
Round my Indiana homestead wave the cornfields,
In the distance loom the woodlands clear and cool.
Oftentimes my thoughts revert to scenes of childhood,
Where I first received my lessons, nature's school.
But one thing there is missing from the picture,
Without her face it seems so incomplete.
I long to see my mother in the doorway,
As she stood there years ago, her boy to greet.

(Chorus)
Oh, the moonlight's fair tonight along the Wabash,
From the fields there comes the breath of newmown hay.
Through the sycamores the candle lights are gleaming,
On the banks of the Wabash, far away.

(Verse)
Many years have passed since I strolled by the river,
Arm in arm, with sweetheart Mary by my side,
It was there I tried to tell her that I loved her,
It was there I begged of her to be my bride.
Long years have passed since I strolled thro' the churchyard.
She's sleeping there, my angel, Mary dear,
I loved her, but she thought I didn't mean it,
Still I'd give my future were she only here.

== Disputes and plagiarism ==
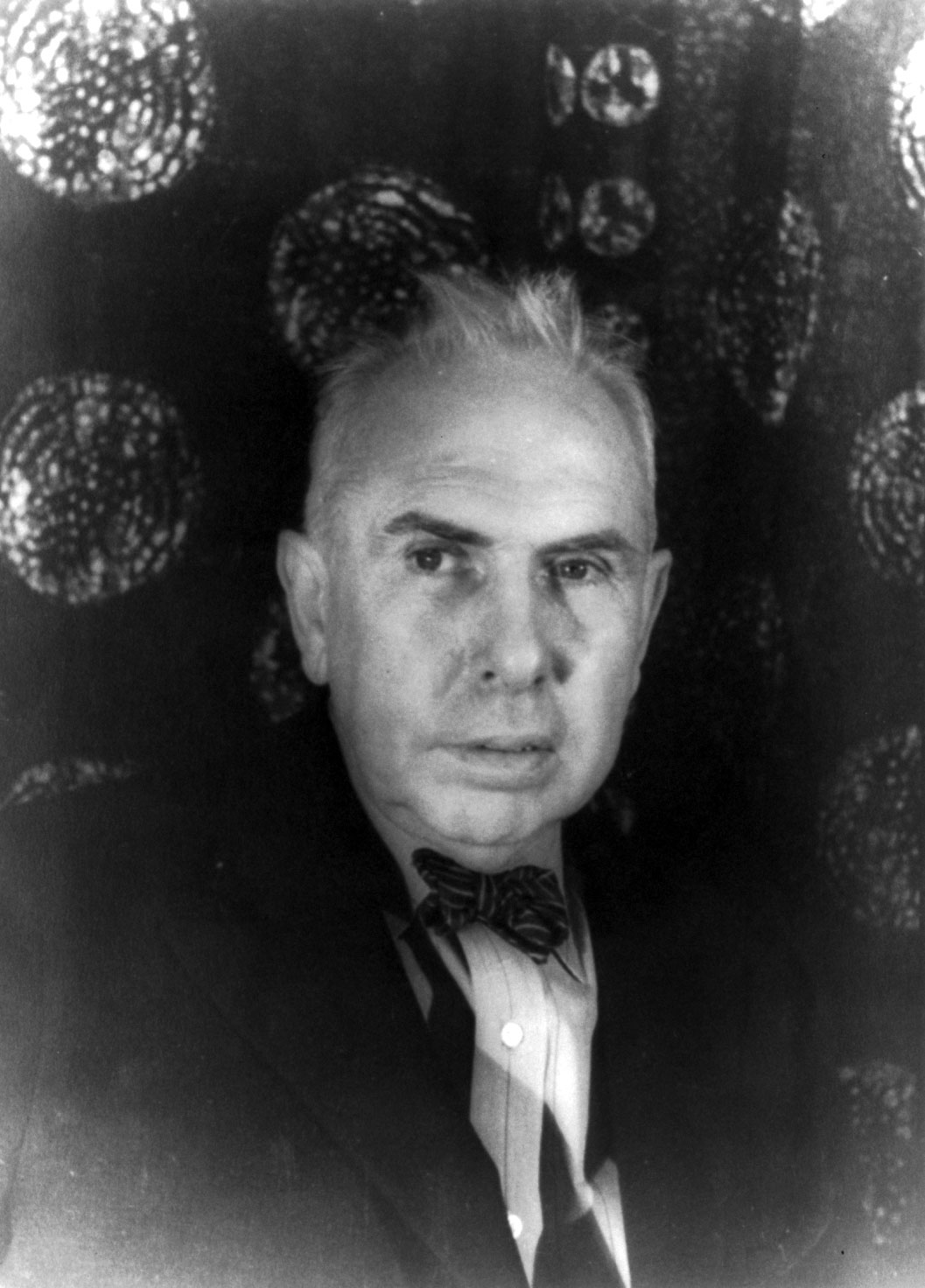
Paul Dresser's younger brother, Theodore Dreiser

A year after the song was published, Dresser's brother Theodore, who later became a famous novelist, privately claimed to have authored its lyrics. In 1917, after Dresser's 1906 death, Theodore made his controversial claim public in a newspaper article. Already a controversial figure because of his open support for communism and tendency to make negative comments about his home state, Theodore's claims were ridiculed in many papers and by prominent Hoosiers who dismissed it as a hoax. Although Theodore never retracted his assertion that he wrote the first verse and chorus of the song, he downplayed the importance of his alleged contribution in later years. It is possible that Theodore did give his brother the idea for the song, and may have even authored a portion of the lyrics, some of which reflect his writing style. The line stating "where I first received my lessons, nature's school" is a possible link, reflecting Theodore's obsession with nature during his youth and his belief that it held the answers to life, a topic he wrote of on several occasions.

Dresser died penniless after his publishing business failed. Known for his generosity, he also had a tendency to overspend and give money to his friends and family. In addition, copyrights to Dresser's music were poorly managed after the Haviland and Dresser Company went bankrupt in 1905. Maurice Richmond Music, who purchased the bankrupt company's copyrights, gave Ballard MacDonald and James Hanley permission to use two bars from Dresser's ballad in a song they published in 1917. MacDonald and Hanley's "Back Home Again in Indiana" has since eclipsed "On the Banks of the Wabash, Far Away" in public use. Their song borrowed heavily from "On the Banks of the Wabash, Far Away" in the chorus, both musically and lyrically, using far more than just the two bars granted to them.

Back Home Again in Indiana (1917)
Song by James F. Hanley and Ballard MacDonald, published by Paull-Pioneer Music Corp. Recording performed by the Homestead Trio, published by Edison Records

Several bars from the last two lines of the chorus are copied almost identically. The lyrics of these same lines, "Through the sycamores the candle lights are gleaming, On the banks of the Wabash, far away" is also borrowed from, and changed to "the gleaming candle lights, are still shining bright, through the sycamore trees". The first part of the chorus, "Oh the moonlight's fair tonight along the Wabash", is also reused and changed to "When I think about the moonlight on the Wabash, then I long for my Indiana home". Under Theodore's guidance, Dresser's estate accused Hanley of plagiarism and threatened to bring a suit against Paull-Pioneer Music Corporation, the publisher of "Back Home Again in Indiana". Despite lengthy discussions, no action was ever taken to resolve the dispute, largely due to the ambiguous nature of U.S. copyright laws in the early 20th century and the estate's lack of finances.

== State song ==
On March 14, 1913, the Indiana General Assembly adopted "On the Banks of the Wabash, Far Away" as the official state song. The song's lyrics and required uses were added to the Indiana Code. The state song was the first official symbol of Indiana, adopted four years before the state flag. In 1925 Indiana General Assembly passed legislation that required Indiana's public school teachers to teach the song as part of their curriculum. That same year the New York Times reported that 20,000 copies of the song were distributed to the state's public school teachers. The song is often played at major sporting events, including the Indianapolis 500.

Although "On the Banks of Wabash, Far Away" is Indiana's official song, "Back Home Again in Indiana" is more widely used and is falsely believed by many to be the state song. One of the leading causes of the state song's fall into obscurity was a change in its use at the Indianapolis 500 during the 1940s. "On the Banks of the Wabash, Far Away" is played at the event as the race cars move into their starting positions, a period that receives little television coverage, while "Back Home Again in Indiana" is sung just before the start of the race and is broadcast publicly. The change to singing "Back Home Again in Indiana" at public events continued in the following years, and it is often played in the place of "On the Banks of the Wabash, Far Away" at state college football games and other prominent events. In 1997, to commemorate the song's centennial anniversary, the Indiana General Assembly passed a resolution reconfirming "On the Banks of the Wabash, Far Away" as the state's official song and urged state institutions to make more use of it and return it to popularity.

== Adaptations ==
In 1898 Andrew B. Sterling wrote a folk adaptation of the song about the Spanish–American War, entitled "On the Shores of Havana, Far Away". The lyrics consisted of a verse lamenting the dead from the explosion of the USS Maine, a second hoping to avoid the draft, and a third criticizing and ridiculing the war. The chorus expressed sorrow for soldiers who had to occupy Havana and those who died in the war. Howley, Haviland and Company published the song, giving Sterling credit for the words, but paying royalties to Dresser for use of the melody.

In 1914 Karl-Ewert Christenson wrote Swedish-language lyrics to the melody of Dresser's song. Christenson titled the new song "Barndomshemmet" ("The Childhood Home"). The Swedish lyrics describe emigration from Sweden to the United States and was made popular by cabaret and revue artist Ernst Rolf, who had one of his first major hits with the song. A 1970 version of "Barndomshemmet" sung by Dan Eriksson reached number one on Svensktoppen, the Swedish hit list.

== Sources ==
- Finson, Jon W. (1997). The Voices That Are Gone: Themes in 19th-century American Popular Song. Oxford University Press US. ISBN 0-19-511382-9.
- Gitelman, Lisa (1997). "Reading Music, Reading Records, Reading Race: Musical Copyright and the U. S. Copyright Act of 1909". Musical Quarterly. 81 (2): 265–290. JSTOR 742465.
- Gitelman, Lisa (1999). Scripts, Grooves, and Writing Machines. Stanford University Press. ISBN 0-8047-3270-1.
- Henderson, Clayton W. (2003). On the Banks of the Wabash: The Life and Music of Paul Dresser. Indiana Historical Society Press. ISBN 0-87195-166-5.
- Loving, Jerome (2005). The Last Titan: A Life of Theodore Dreiser. University of California Press. ISBN 0-520-23481-2.
