= Mr. Volunteer, or, You don't Belong To The Regulars You're Just A Volunteer =

Song
- Language: English
- Published: 1901
- Songwriter: Paul Dresser

"Mr. Volunteer, or, You don't Belong To The Regulars You're Just A Volunteer" is a musical score for voice and piano written by Paul Dresser. The score was first published in 1901 by Howley, Haviland & Dresser in New York, NY.

The sheet music can be found at the Pritzker Military Museum & Library.
