= On the Banks of the Wabash (film) =

1923 film

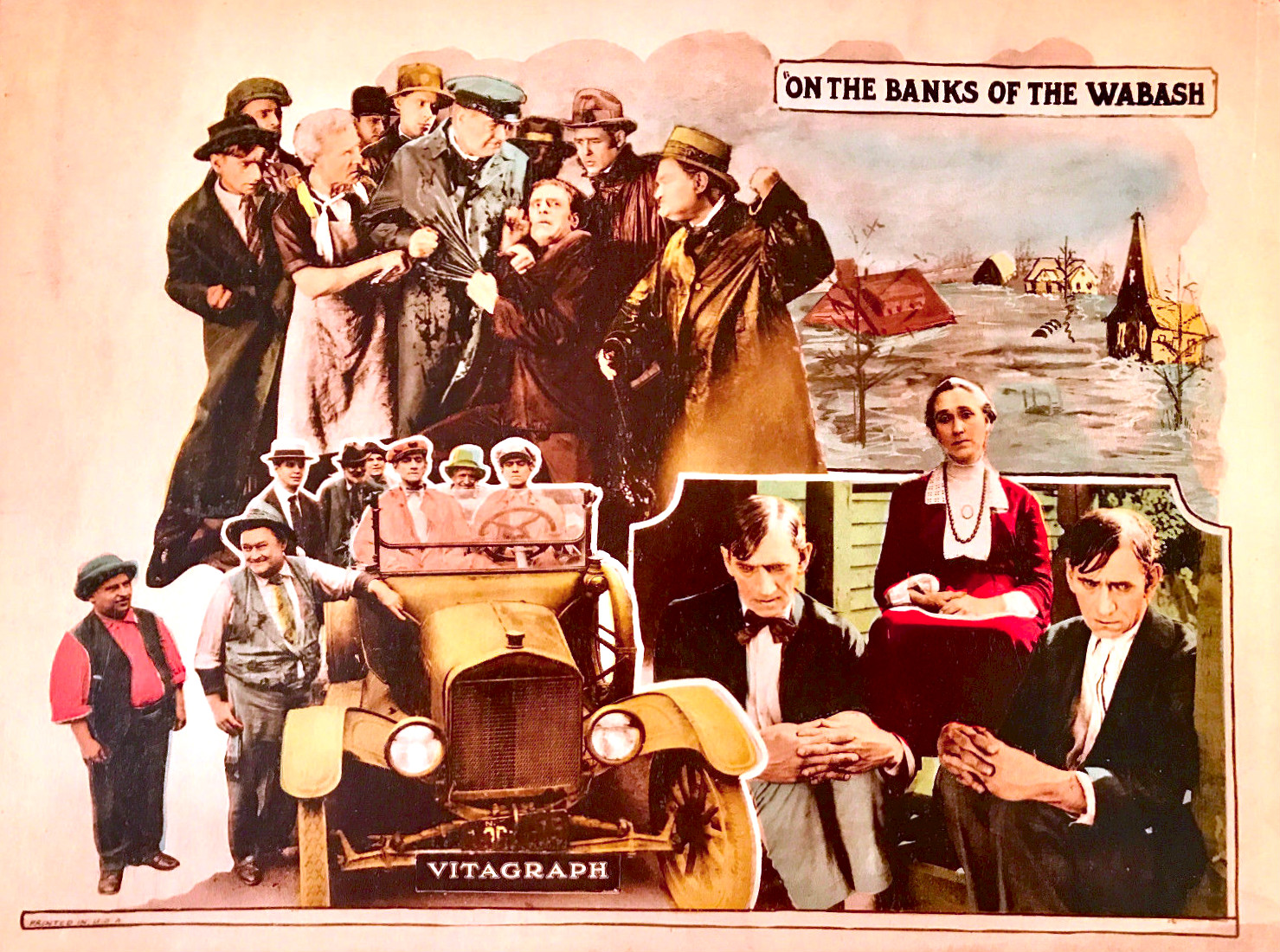
- Lobby card
- Directed by: J. Stuart Blackton
- Written by: Elaine Sterne Carrington
- Produced by: Albert E. Smith
- Starring: Mary Carr; Madge Evans; Burr McIntosh
- Cinematography: Nicholas Musuraca
- Distributed by: Vitagraph Studios
- Release date: October 22, 1923
- Running time: 70 minutes
- Country: United States
- Language: Silent (English intertitles)

On the Banks of the Wabash is a 1923 American silent rural melodrama film directed by J. Stuart Blackton and produced and distributed by his movie company, Vitagraph Studios. The film stars Mary Carr and among the cast are 14-year-old Madge Evans and James W. Morrison. The cameraman was Nicholas Musuraca. The film is very loosely based on Paul Dresser's song / poem "On the Banks of the Wabash, Far Away". The film focuses on David Hammond (Morrison), who, spurred by invention, leaves his sweetheart Lisbeth (Evans), but returns to find her love unchanged amidst a crisis, ultimately leading to a joyous reunion.

== Cast ==
- Mary Carr as Anne Bixler
- Burr McIntosh as "Cap" Hammond
- James W. Morrison as David
- Lumsden Hare as Paul Bixler
- Mary MacLaren as Yvonne
- Madge Evans as Lisbeth
- George Neville as Sash Brown
- Marcia Harris as Tilda Spiffen
- Edward Roseman as Westerley Spiffen

== Production ==
In an interview from the book "Silent Players" by Anthony Slide, director J. Stuart Blackton's daughter recalled the collaboration with actor James W. Morrison, saying that Morrison "last played for my father in a ghastly film we made in the flatbush studio about 1923. On the Banks of the Wabash. It was so earthy you could smell it. Not a nice smell really."

== Preservation ==
Reportedly, a private collector holds an abridged, or shortened, version of this film.

== See also ==
- List of lost films
