= Paul Dresser Birthplace =

Historic house in Indiana, United States

- U.S. National Register of Historic Places
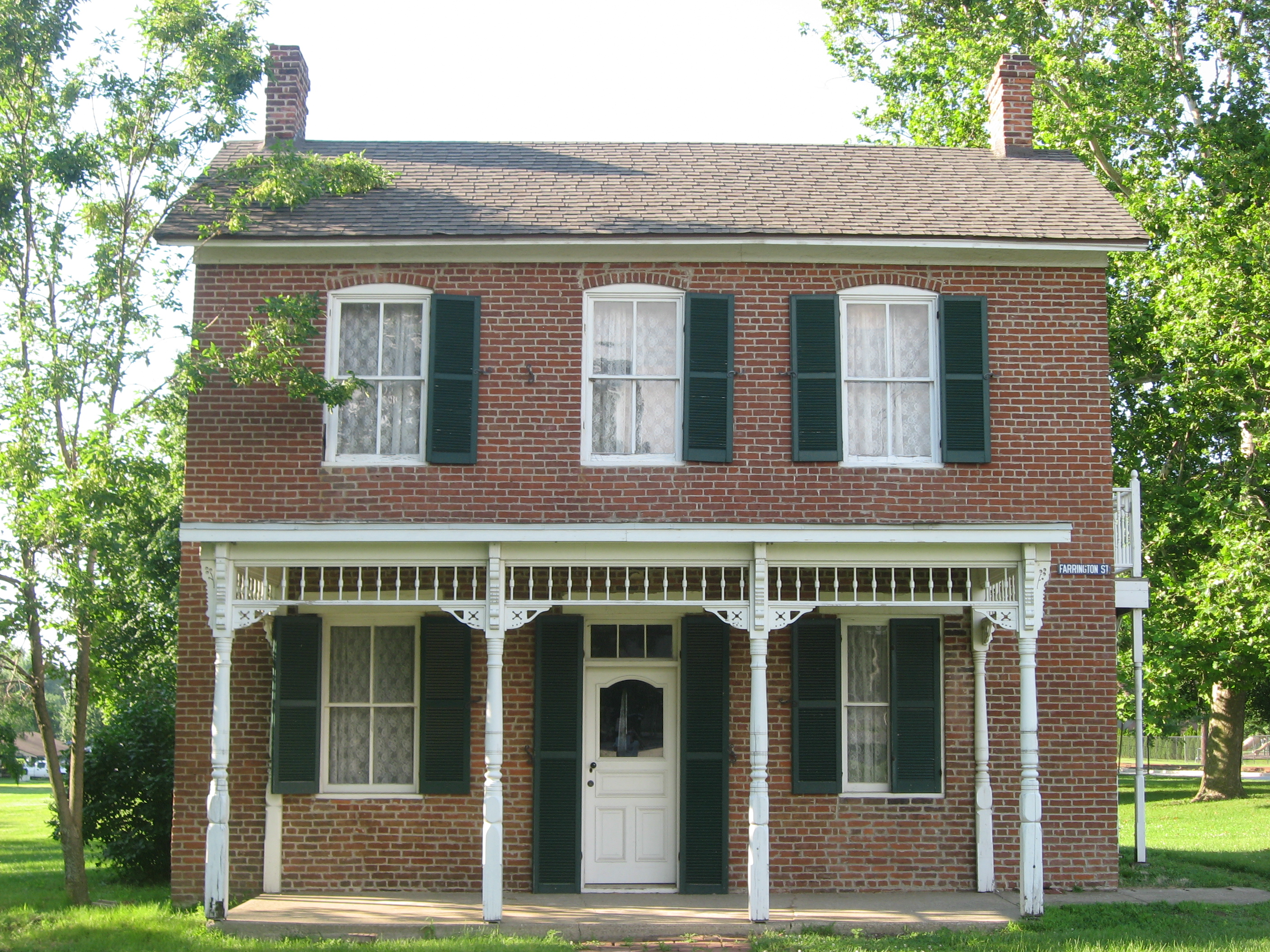
- Front of the building

- Location within Vigo County, Indiana Location within Indiana Location within the United States
- Location: 1st and Farrington Sts., Terre Haute, Indiana
- Coordinates: 39°27′24″N 87°25′2″W
- Area: less than one acre
- NRHP reference No.: 73000024
- Added to NRHP: January 22, 1973

The Paul Dresser Birthplace is located in Fairbanks Park in Terre Haute, Indiana, at the corner of First and Farrington Streets. Listed on the National Register of Historic Places, it is the birthplace and boyhood home of Paul Dresser, a late-nineteenth-century singer, actor, and songwriter, who wrote and published more than 100 popular songs. On March 14, 1913, the Indiana General Assembly named Dresser's hit, "On the Banks of the Wabash, Far Away", the state song of Indiana.

Built in 1850, the home was owned by Dresser's parents, Johann Paul and Sarah (Schanab) Dreiser. Their son, Johann Paul Dreiser Jr., who later changed his name to Paul Dresser, was born in the house on April 22, 1858. Dresser's father built the porch for the brick house, which originally consisted of one bedroom, a lean-to kitchen, and a parlor. In 1863 Dresser's father sold the home and moved the family to Sullivan, Indiana. By 1871 they had returned to Terre Haute, but Dresser did not stay in town for long. Dresser left home at the age of sixteen and became "one of the most important composers of the 1890s". Dresser toured the country as a vaudeville entertainer, then moved to New York City, where he was also involved in music publishing. Dresser returned to Terre Haute only for brief visits and public performances.

Originally, the house was located at 318 South Second Street in Terre Haute. During the 1960s, when urban renewal threatened its demolition, the Vigo County Historical Society raised funds purchase the building (through a process of eminent domain), saving it from destruction, and relocated it to the southeast corner of Fairbanks Park. Altered over the years, the building consists of two floors. The first floor has a bedroom, a kitchen, and a parlor. The second floor has two bedrooms that are accessible by an outside staircase. The Vigo County Historical Society operates the home as a museum, open by appointment. Artifacts pertaining to Dresser include a Chickering piano that he used to write songs and a portrait of Dresser painted during the height of his career. Unlike other house museums, Dresser's birthplace reflects the furnishings of a working-class family, not the well-to-do.

In 1967 the Indiana General Assembly designated the home as a state shrine and memorial. That same year the National Music Council listed it as "A Landmark of American Music". The property was listed on the National Register of Historic Places in 1973. Terre Haute's Fairbanks Park also includes a local Girl Scout office and a Terre Haute parks department office. In 1923 the Banks-of-the-Wabash Association officially named Paul Dresser Drive, the park's main road, in the songwriter's honor.

== Gallery ==
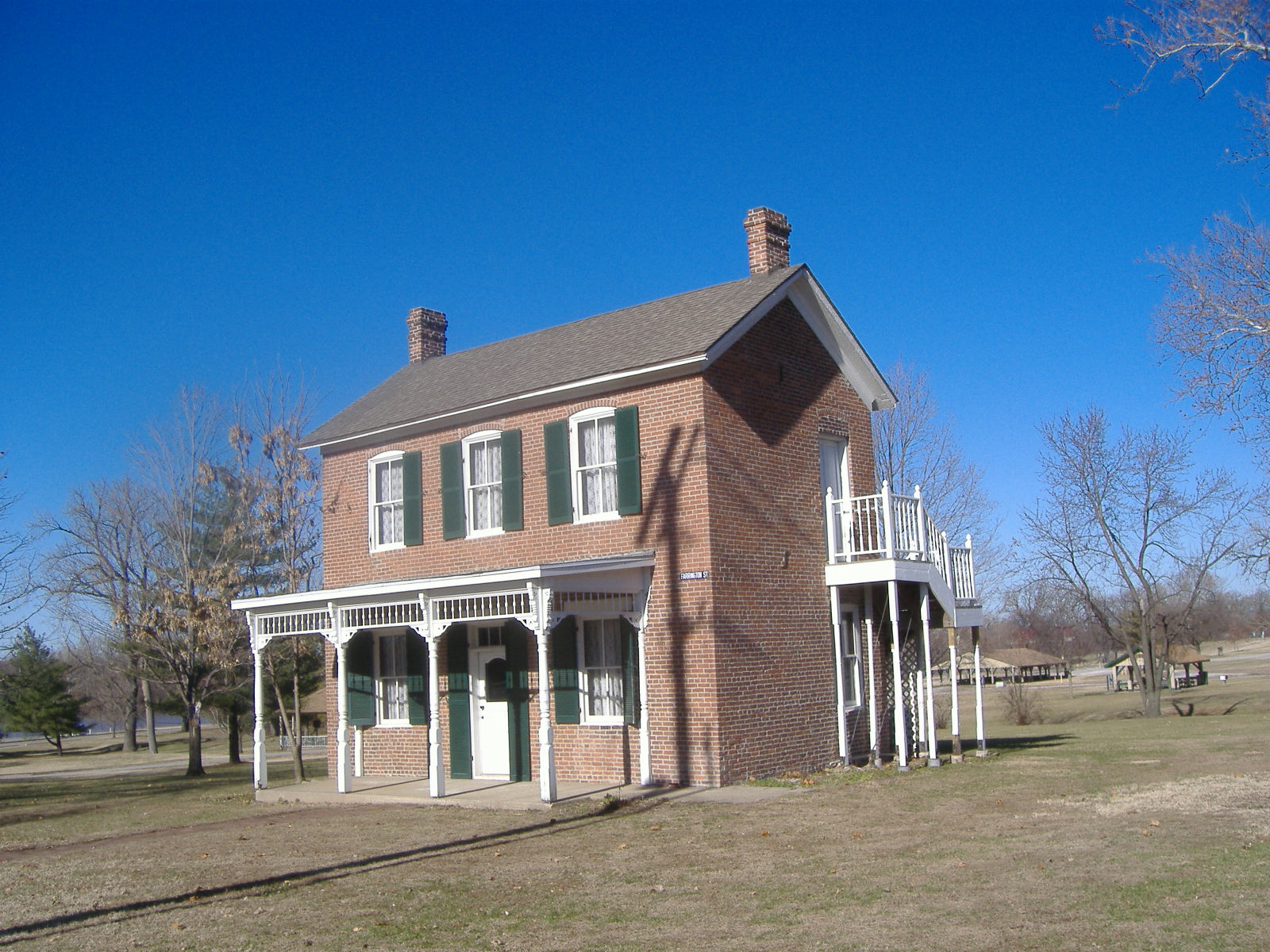
Front and side view of home

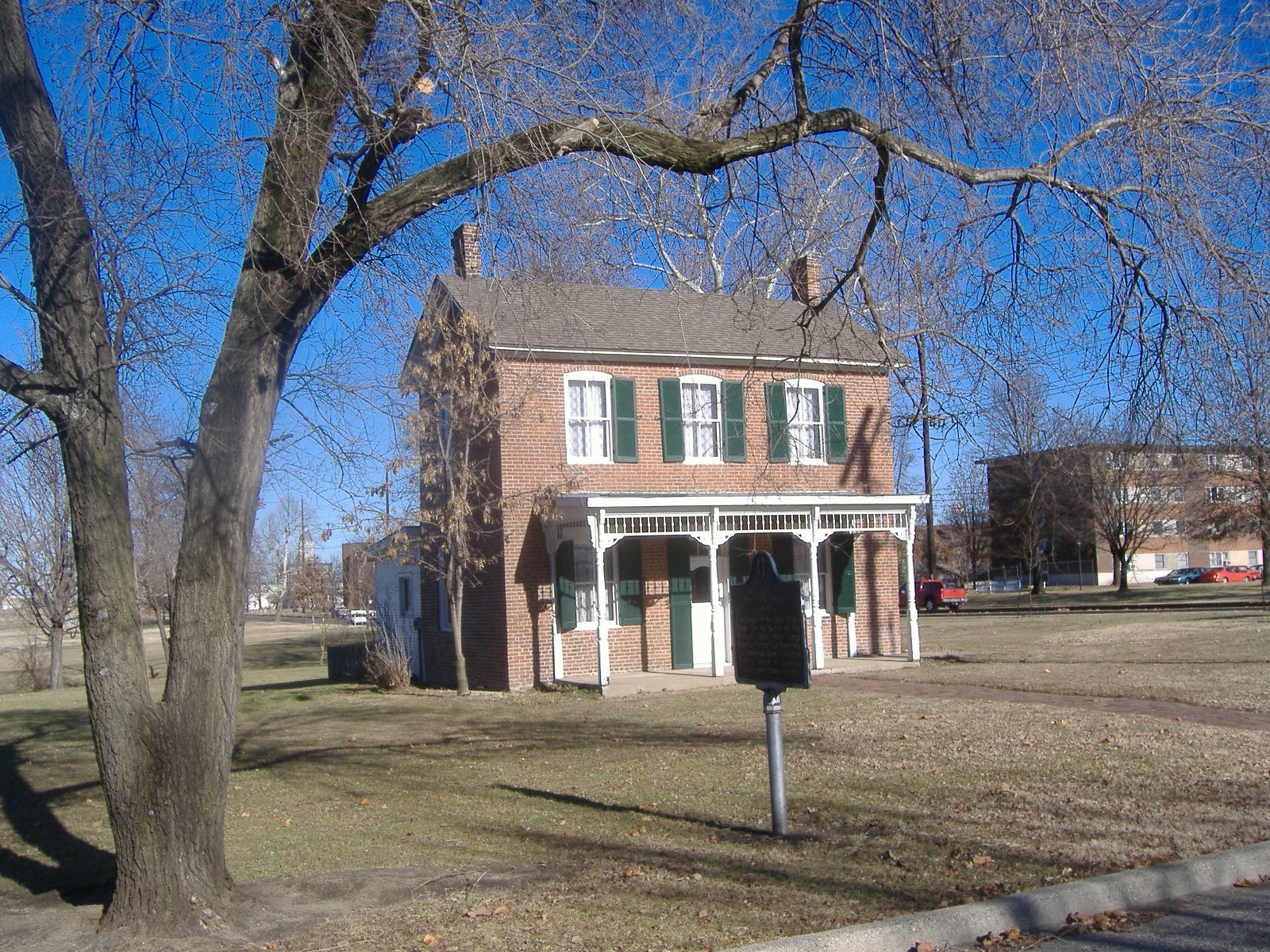
Front view of home

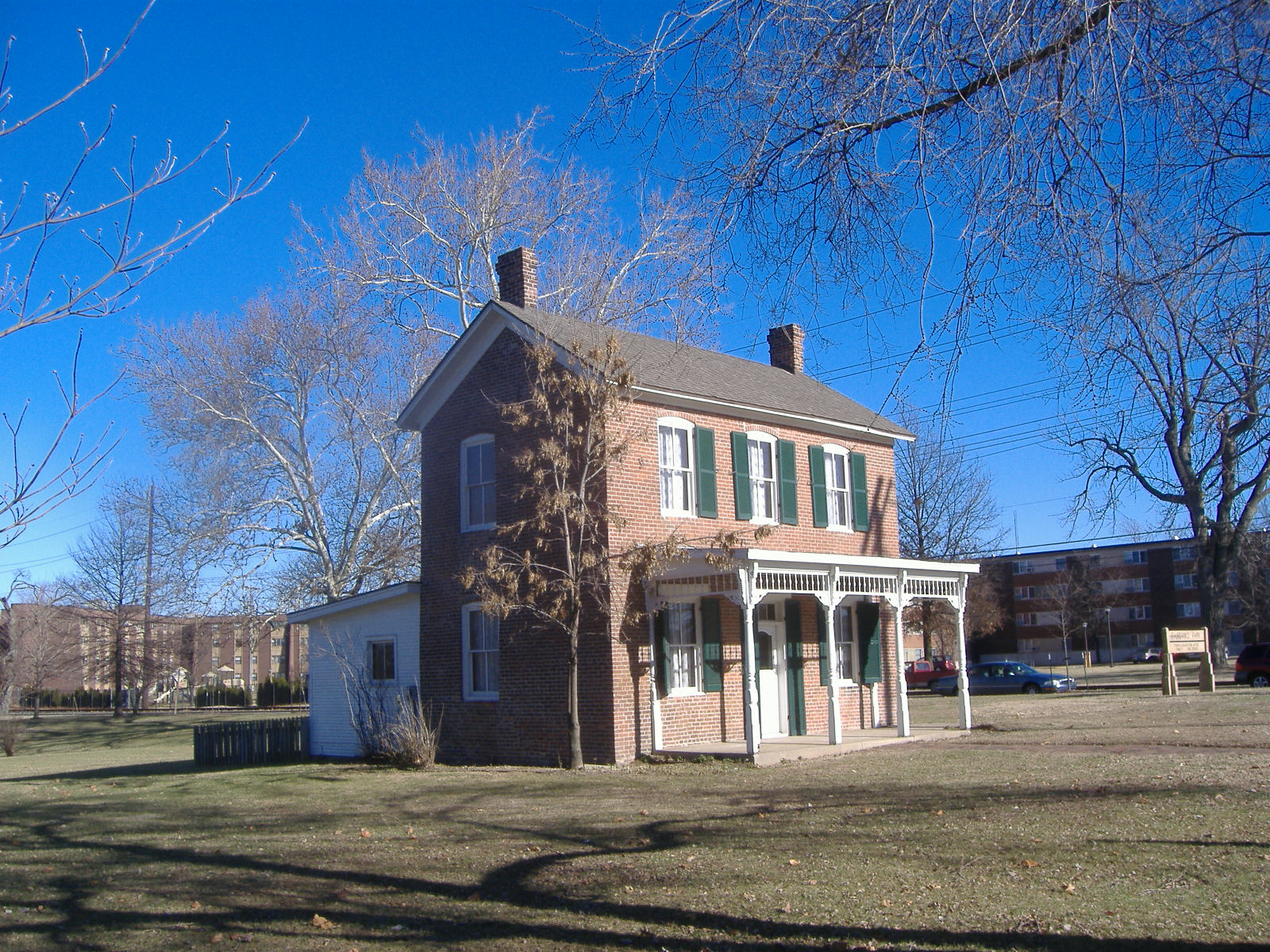
River side of home

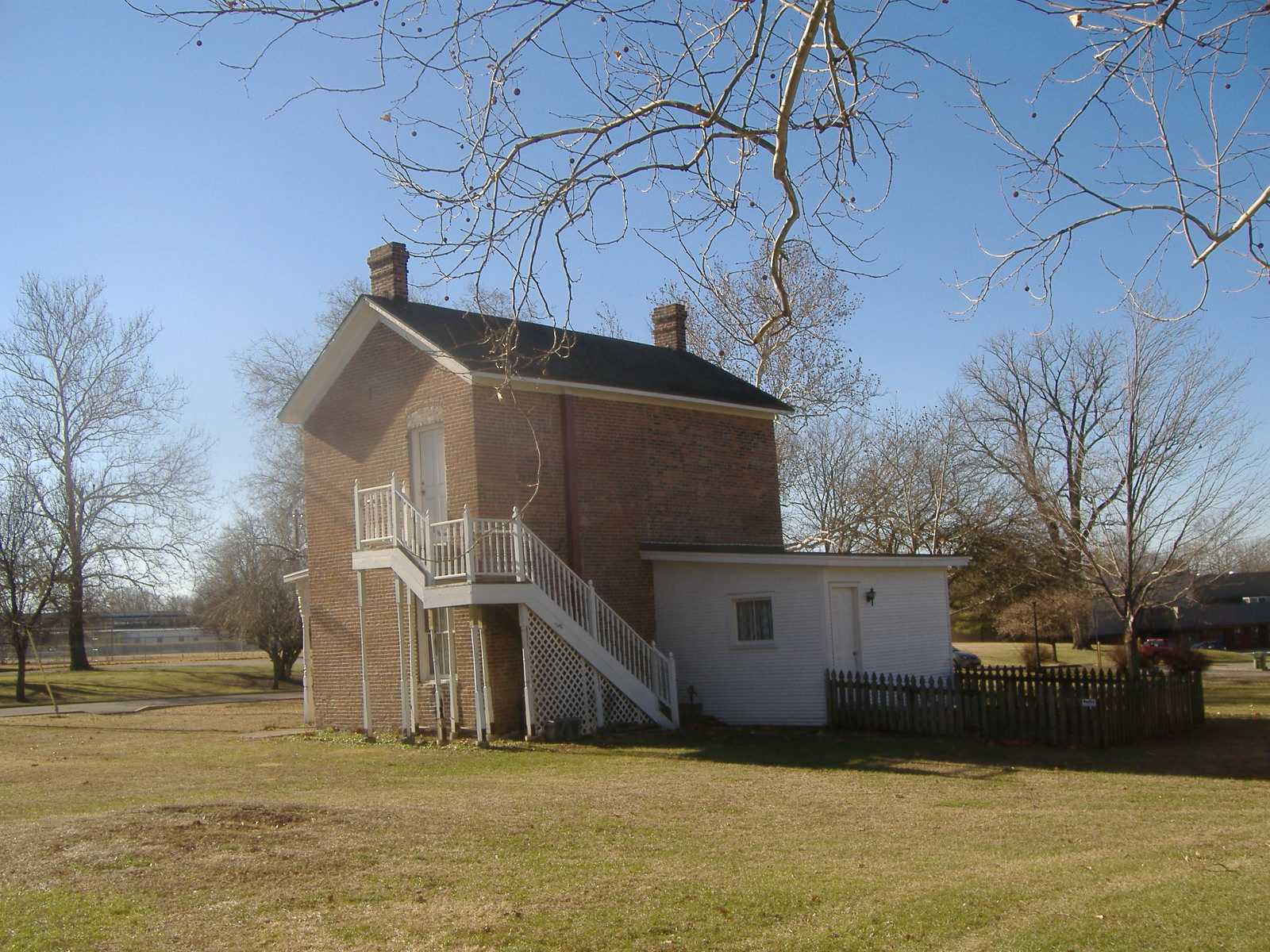
Rear of home

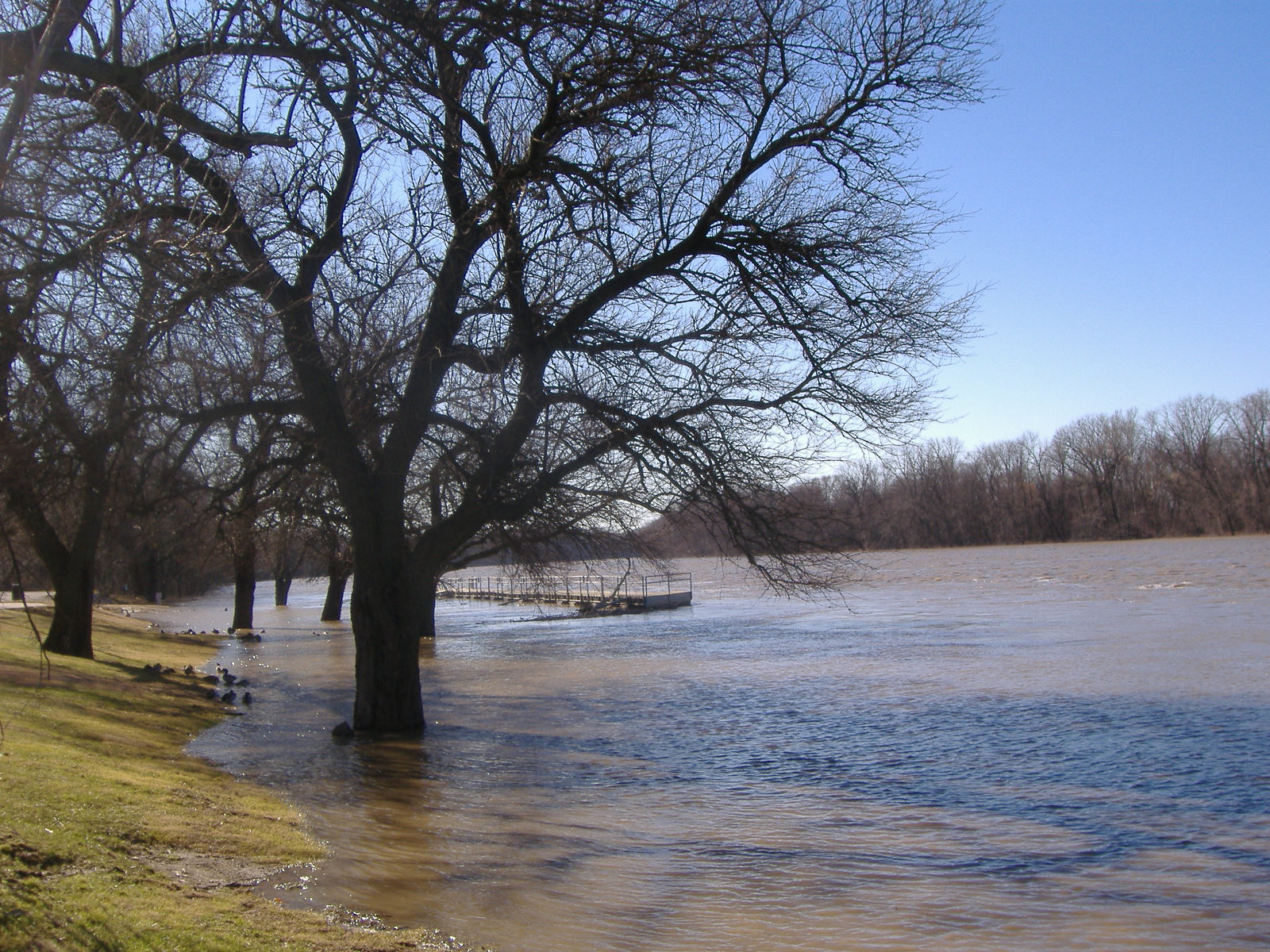
The Wabash River by Dresser's home, looking downstream

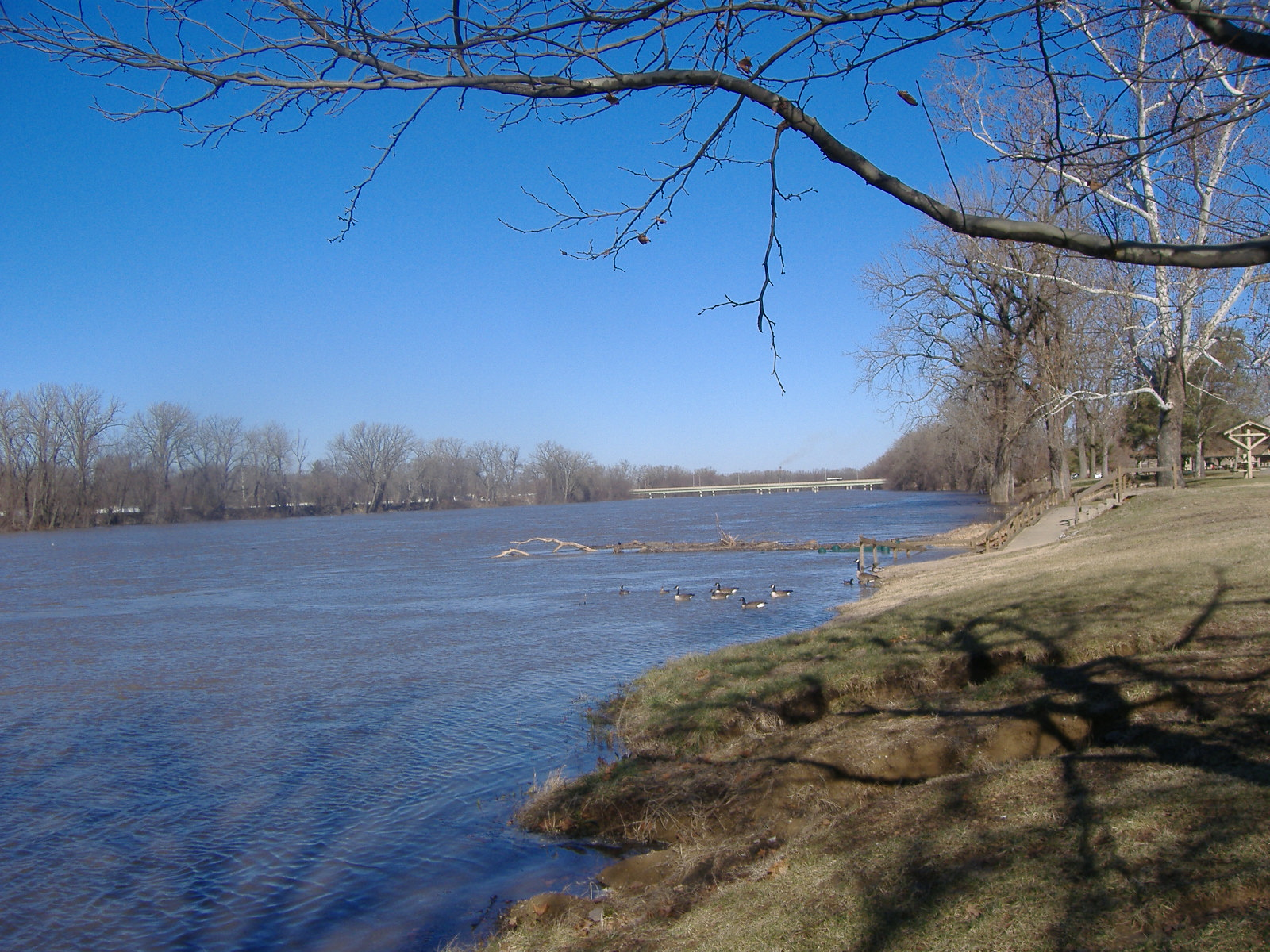
The Wabash River by Dresser's home, looking upstream
