= The Blue and the Gray (song) =

Song composed by Paul Dresser

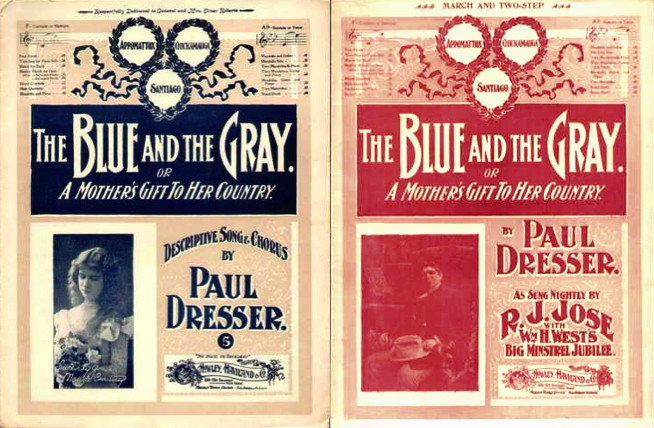
Sheet music covers, 1900, New York: Howley, Haviland & Co. Richard Jose promotional version (right, red), and one promoting a woman singer (blue, left).

"The Blue and the Gray (or A Mother’s Gift to Her Country)" is a song composed by Paul Dresser. It was a sentimental ballad, written in what came to be known as “mother-and-home” style for which Dresser was known. It was first published in 1900 in New York by Howley, Haviland & Co. and was one of the more popular songs published and recorded in the early 1900s. The colors in the title refer to United States Army and Confederate States Army uniforms of the period, respectively.

== Early performances and recordings ==
Upon its release, "The Blue and the Gray" was associated with singer Richard Jose, a counter-tenor who worked closely with Dresser and who often sang the song on the vaudeville stage. The song was recorded by Arthur Collins on March 10, 1900, for Berliner Gramophone and again on July 21, 1900, for the Victor Talking Machine Company. It was also recorded several times between 1900 and 1903 by Harry Macdonough for Victor and by a number of artists for Zonophone, including Victor Herbert's Band, Edward Favor and Bert Morphy.

== Subject ==
The song tells the story of a mother who lost two sons in the American Civil War (at Appomattox and Chickamauga) and, over thirty years later, loses a third son in Cuba during the Spanish–American War. The song was one of several songs Dresser wrote about the latter war, which ended in 1898. Its lyrics are:

A mother's gift to her country's cause is a story yet untold
She had three sons, three only sons, each worth his weight in gold
She gave them up for the sake of war, while her heart was filled with pain
As each went away, she was heard to say, he will never return again

Chorus
One lies down near Appomattax, many miles away
Another sleeps at Chickamauga, and they both wore suits of gray
'Mid the strains of "Down to Dixie", the third was laid away
In a trench at Santiago, the Blue and the Gray

She's alone tonight, while the stars shine bright, with a heart full of despair
On the last great day, I can hear her say, my three boys will be there
Perhaps they'll wait, at the heav'nly gates, on guard beside their guns
Then the mother true, to the gray and blue, may enter with her sons
