= My Gal Sal =

1942 film by Irving Cummings

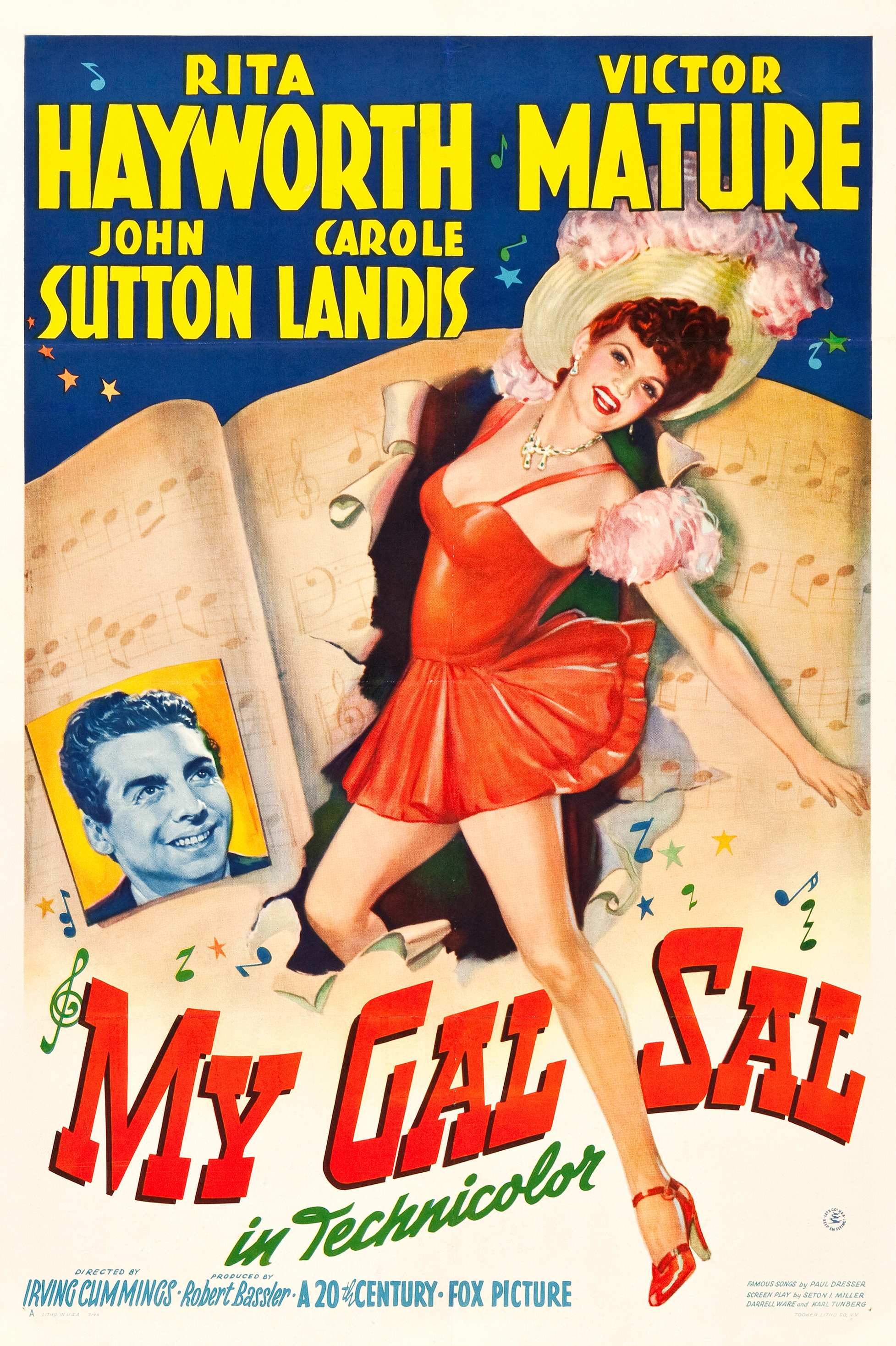
- Theatrical release poster
- Directed by: Irving Cummings
- Screenplay by: Seton I. Miller; Darrell Ware; Karl Tunberg; Helen Richardson (Note: Contributing writer (uncredited))
- Based on: Story "My Brother Paul" from the book Twelve Men by Theodore Dreiser
- Produced by: Robert Bassler
- Starring: Rita Hayworth; Victor Mature; John Sutton; Carole Landis
- Cinematography: Ernest Palmer
- Edited by: Robert Simpson
- Music by: Leigh Harline; Cyril J. Mockridge
- Distributed by: 20th Century-Fox
- Release date: April 30, 1942
- Running time: 103 minutes
- Country: United States
- Language: English
- Box office: $1.7 million (US and Canada rentals)

My Gal Sal is a 1942 American musical romantic comedy film directed by Irving Cummings and starring Rita Hayworth, Victor Mature, John Sutton, and Carole Landis. It is a loosely-biographical treatment of the life of the 19th century American songwriter, Paul Dresser,

In the film, Dresser runs away from his Indiana home and, following a brief stopover with a medicine show, arrives in New York City. After meeting fictional musical star Sally Elliott, he composes the title tune for her and becomes the toast of Tin Pan Alley.

== Plot ==
The real Paul Dresser

During the later part of the 19th century, Paul Dresser is a young man living with his parents in Indiana. Paul wants to become a musician, but his father disagrees, insisting that he become a minister. In his first appearance in town as an entertainer, Paul is unknowingly used by a con man as a front to sell fake jewelry. When the townspeople realize they have been scammed, they turn on Paul. An angry mob covers Paul in tar and feathers and forces him out of town. Mae Collins, a singer in Colonel Truckee's Kickapoo Indian Remedy Extravaganza, a traveling medicine show, finds Paul in the countryside. She brings him along with the troupe, nursing him back to health. Paul soon develops his own act for the show, wearing a gaudy suit while playing two pianos simultaneously.

During a stop in Buffalo, New York, a group of entertainers from New York City attend the show. They are led by singing star Sally Elliott and her producer, Fred Haviland. When they make fun of Paul's act and outfit, he is offended, However, Sally says that she likes one of Paul's tunes, and Fred offers him tickets to her Broadway show. Paul and Mae travel to New York City to see the show, laughing at Sally's performance as their payback for the rudeness in Buffalo. However, the experience motivates Paul to be taken seriously as a musician.

Back in Buffalo, Paul quits the medicine show, leave Mae and moves to New York. While there, he happens to hear music publisher Pat Howley playing one of Paul's songs from the Buffalo show on the piano. He realizes that Sally stole the song and changed the lyrics. Impressed with Paul's talent, Pat signs him to a publishing contract and joins him in reclaiming his rights over the song. After Paul accuses Sally of stealing his song, Pat convinces Paul that an association with Sally could help him establish a name for himself. Pat makes a deal with Fred, and Paul becomes Sally's personal songwriter.

Paul composes the song "Come Tell Me What's Your Answer, Yes or No" for Sally, which turns into a big success for her. In the meantime, Paul has developed feelings for Sally. After a party to celebrate the song's success, he offers to accompany her back to her hotel. She reluctantly agrees, but does not invite him into her suite. The next morning, Paul tells Sally that he has rented the suite across from hers. That night, Sally returns to her suite from rehearsal and finds Paul writing a song, "Here You Are", at her piano. The two perform the song together and eventually kiss.

Over time, Paul writes a string of song hits for Sally. However, his success goes to his head and he begins to pursue the married Countess Mariana Rossini. Sally learns that Paul is accompanying Mariana on an ocean cruise; in a fit of anger, she cuts up his new suits. When Paul finds his suits destroyed, he retaliates by ruining Sally's dresses. She calls the police and he is arrested. Soon after his release from jail, Paul declines the cruise invitation from Mariana and reconciles with Sally. When the couple get stuck on a Ferris wheel, Paul proposes to Sally and she accepts.

That night, Paul returns to his suite and finds a message. It states that Mariana's jealous husband has challenged him to a duel. Enraged, Paul storms over to their home to confront him. However, on arriving there, he only finds Mariana. It turns out the duel message was just a fake to get Paul to come over. He spends the night at the house drinking with Mariana, but he refuses any intimate contact. When Sally sees Mariana dropping Paul off at the hotel the next morning, she assumes the worst. Despite all his claims of innocence, she breaks off their engagement.

Time passes and Sally goes on tour with Fred, refusing to include any of Paul's songs in her shows. Now on his own, all of Paul's new songs are commercial failures. In San Francisco, California, a music broker presents Sally with a new song, "My Gal Sal". He claims it was written by an unknown Southern composer.. After Sally performs the song in her show, Paul surprises her in her dressing room. He reveals that he composed "My Gal Sal". After thrashing out their grievances, Paul and Sally reconcile.

== Cast ==
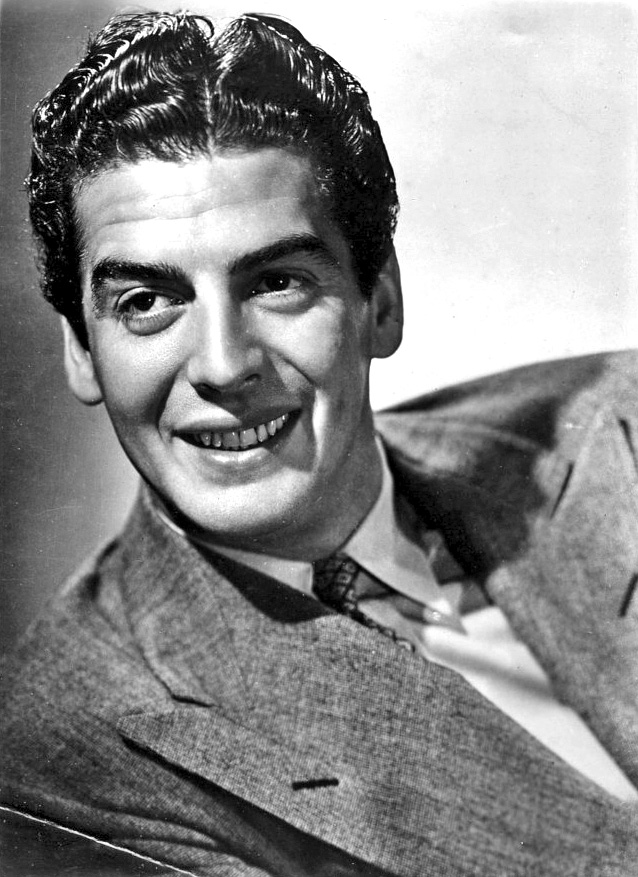
Victor Mature as Paul Dresser

- Rita Hayworth as Sally Elliott (singing voice was dubbed by Nan Wynn)
- Victor Mature as Paul Dresser (singing voice was dubbed by Ben Gage)
- John Sutton as Fred Haviland
- Carole Landis as Mae Collins
- James Gleason as Pat Hawley
- Phil Silvers as Wiley
- Walter Catlett as Colonel Truckee
- Mona Maris as Countess Mariana Rossini
- Frank Orth as McGuinness
- Stanley Andrews as Mr. Dreiser
- Margaret Moffatt as Mrs. Dreiser
- Libby Taylor as Ida, Sally's maid
- John Kelly as John L. Sullivan
- Curt Bois as De Rochemont
- Hermes Pan as dancing partner
- Gregory Gaye as Monsieur Garnier
- Andrew Tombes as Corbin
- Albert Conti as Henri
- Charles Arnt as tailor
- Terry Moore as Carrie Dreiser (uncredited)
- Iron Eyes Cody as Indian (uncredited)
- George Melford as conductor (uncredited)

Choreographer Hermes Pan appears as Hayworth's dance partner in the "Gay White Way" number.

== Production ==
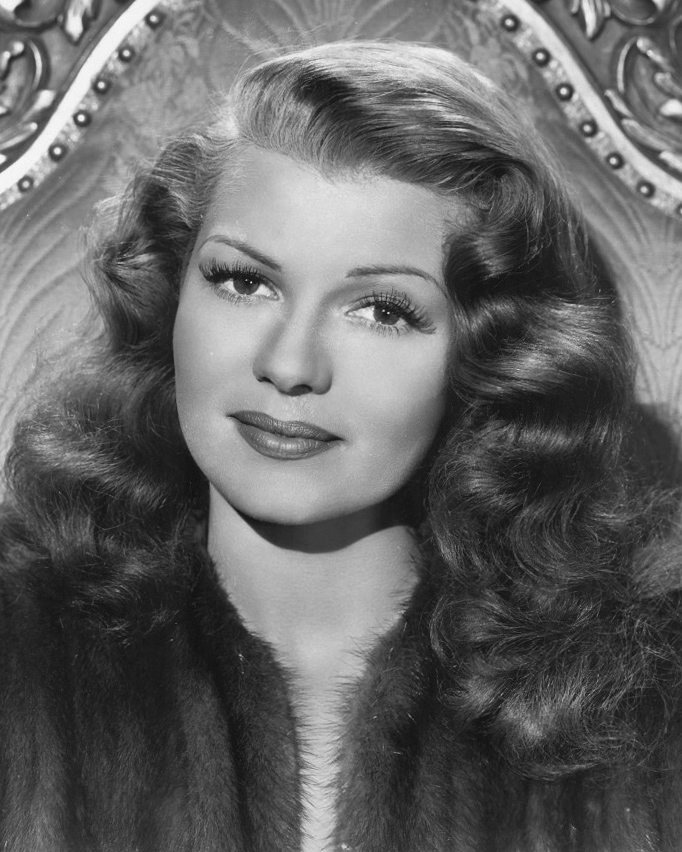
Rita Hayworth as Sally Elliot

My Gal Sal was based on a biographical essay by Dresser's younger brother, novelist Theodore Dreiser. The film contained some Dressler songs, but several others were created in the 1890s style by the songwriting team of Ralph Rainger and Leo Robin.

20th Century Fox head Darryl F. Zanuck purchased the film rights for My Gal Sal from Dreiser for $50,000 in 1942. Zanuck initially taylored the script and lead role of Sally Elliott for Fox's biggest female star, Alice Faye. Faye was going to star with Carole Landis, George Montgomery, and John Shepperd.

However, Faye stated that she was tired of costume musicals and turned it down. Zanuck then offered the lead role to Grable, who was becoming Faye's successor at Fox. However, Grable rejected it also, citing overwork by Fox.

Zanuck ordered the My Gal Sal script rewritten and redirected to showcase Irene Dunne, but she would not be available for 18 months. Zanuck subsequently approached Mae West with the role, but she too turned it down.

Zanuck then considered grooming newcomer Carole Landis for the part, but her screen test failed to impress the producers. Zanuck did cast Landis in the secondary lead of Mae Collins because Fox had already announced her participation in the film. Landis later voiced his dissatisfaction by urging her fan club members to complain to Fox over the snub.

Zanuck finally approached Harry Cohn, head of Columbia Pictures, about borrowing Hayworth for the film. Zanuck had been impressed with Hayworth's performance in the 1941 film version of Blood and Sand, also for Fox. Cohn, on the other hand, was hoping to buy My Gal Sal from Fox and cast Hayworth in the part himself. Zanuck refused to sell the film rights, but instead offered Hayworth an exclusive two-movie contract for My Gal Sal and Tales of Manhattan (1942). Cohn agreed to loan Hayworth to Fox for both movies.Mature's role was originally meant for Don Ameche.

== Reception ==
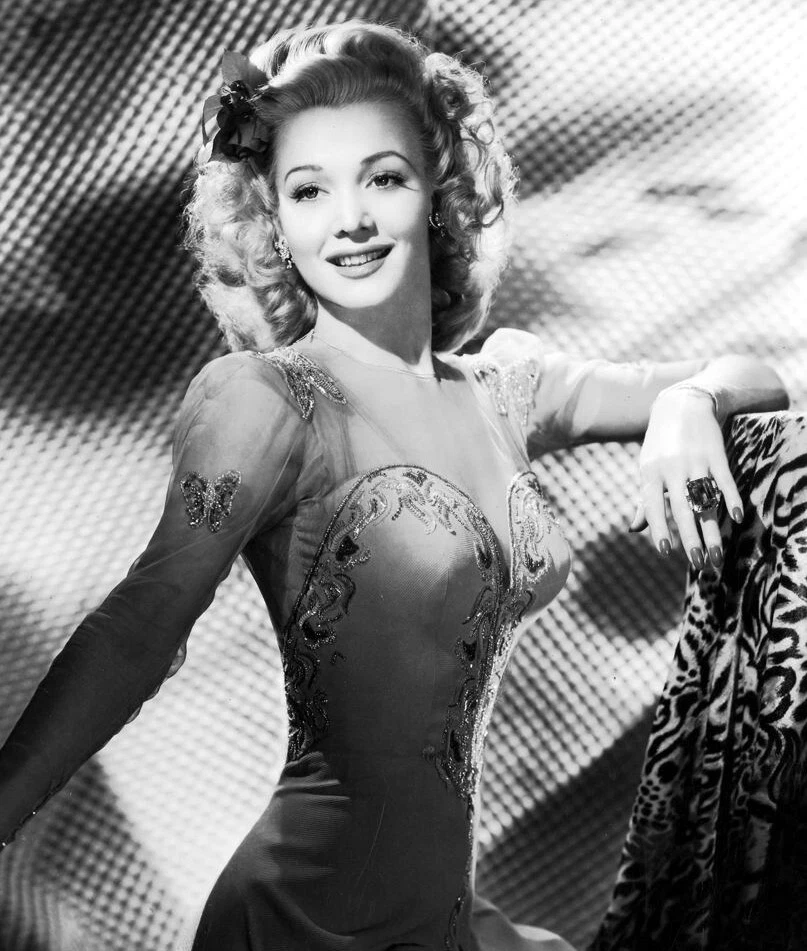
Carole Landis as Mae Collins

My Gal Sal received positive reviews upon its 1942 release. Daily Variety termed the film a very "lively, merry musical treat. A picture crammed with color, songs, and movement, carrying broad appeal for all theatergoers, both young and old." Hayworth was proclaimed to have done a "beautiful job" as Sally, while Mature turned out an "impressing performance" as Dresser.

Life magazine stated: "My Gal Sal hits a current demand, both in the movies and in radio, for the nostalgic delights of the 1890s."The film went on to become one of the most-successful Fox films during 1942.

Some of Hayworth's lines were sampled in the Pet Shop Boys 1996 track "Electricity." The film happened to be playing on television while the track was being recorded, and was not publicly identified until 2019.

== Awards ==
My Gal Sal won the Academy Award for Best Art Direction, Color (Richard Day, Joseph C. Wright and Thomas Little). It also was nominated for Academy Award for Best Scoring of a Musical Picture (Alfred Newman).

== Reissue ==
My Gal Sal was reissued by Fox in 1949, together with The House on 92nd Street (1945), to capitalize on the publicity of Hayworth's marriage to Prince Aly Khan.
