= Paul Dresser =

American singer, songwriter and comedic actor (1858–1906)

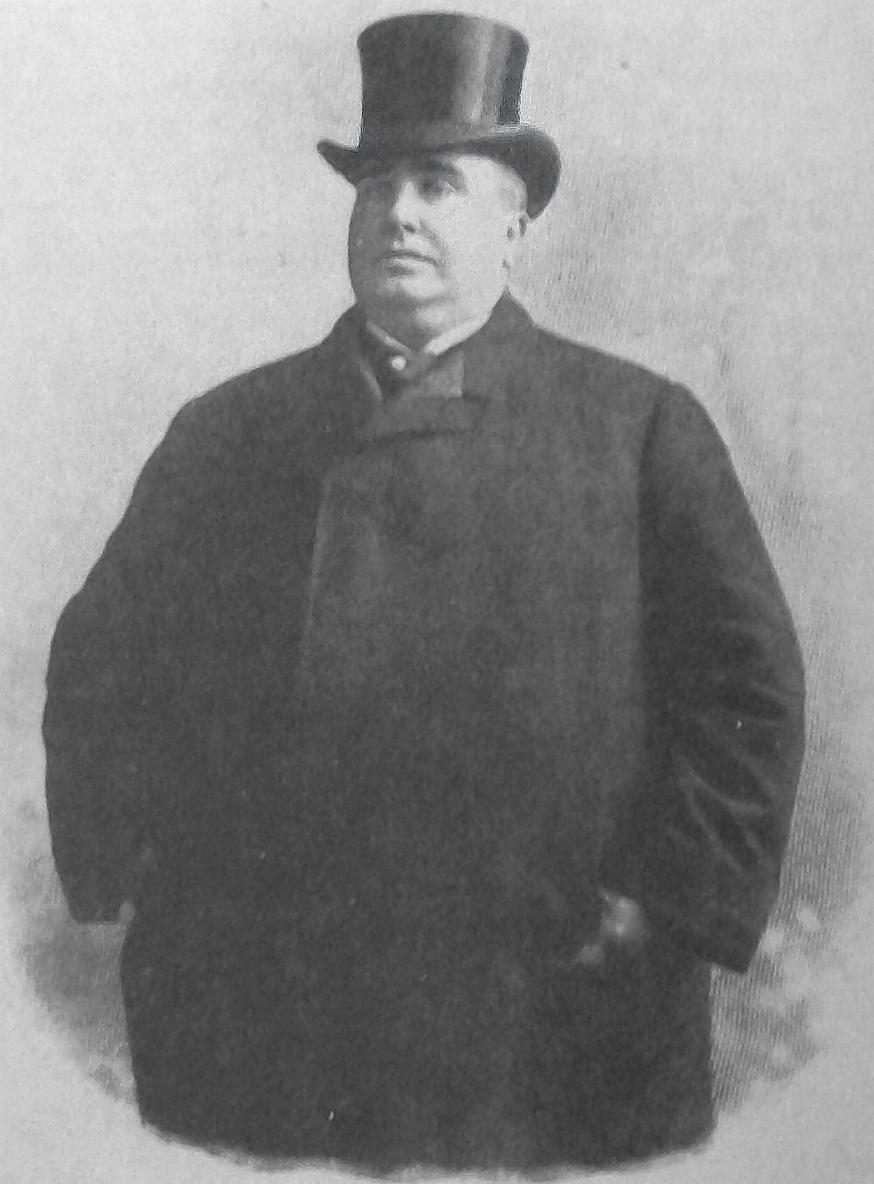
- Paul Dresser as he appeared on the 1897 back cover of the sheet music for "On the Banks of the Wabash, Far Away"
- Born: Johann Paul Dreiser Jr; April 22, 1858; Terre Haute, Indiana, U.S.
- Died: January 30, 1906 (aged 47); New York City, U.S.
- Resting place: St. Boniface Cemetery, Chicago
- Occupations: Songwriter; actor; playwright; composer; musician
- Awards: Songwriters Hall of Fame

Paul Dresser (born Johann Paul Dreiser Jr.; April 22, 1858 – January 30, 1906) was an American singer, songwriter, and comedic actor of the late nineteenth and early twentieth centuries. Dresser performed in traveling minstrel and medicine-wagon shows and as a vaudeville entertainer for decades, before transitioning to music publishing later in life. His biggest hit, "On the Banks of the Wabash, Far Away" (1897), was the best selling song of its time. Although Dresser had no formal training in music composition, he wrote ballads that had wide appeal, including some of the most popular songs of the era. During a career that spanned nearly two decades, from 1886 to 1906, Dresser composed and published more than 150 songs. Following the success of "Wabash", many newspapers compared Dresser to popular composer Stephen Foster. "On the Banks of the Wabash, Far Away" became the official song of Indiana in 1913. The Paul Dresser Birthplace in Terre Haute is designated as a state shrine and memorial. Dresser was inducted into the Songwriters Hall of Fame in 1970.

Dresser grew up in a large family (including his brother, novelist Theodore Dreiser) and lived in Sullivan and Terre Haute, Indiana. He had a troubled childhood and spent time in jail. Dresser left home at age sixteen to join a traveling minstrel act and performed in several regional theaters before joining John Hamlin's Wizard Oil traveling medicine-wagon show in 1878. Dresser composed his first songs while working for Hamlin. He settled in Evansville, Indiana, for several years while continuing to work as a traveling performer and musician. Eventually, he became a nationally known talent and participated in several traveling acts, including The Two Johns, A Tin Soldier, and The Danger Signal. Dresser's songwriting talent developed during his years as a performer; he began by writing songs featured in his shows and later wrote and sold songs to others' acts. Dresser moved to New York City, and in 1893 Dresser joined Tin Pan Alley's Howley, Haviland and Company, a New York City sheet music publisher, as a silent partner. At the height of his success, Dresser was a nationally known entertainer, successful songwriter, and sheet music publisher. He was generous, especially to family and friends, and a lavish spender. The turn of the century brought him financial distress when his music fell out of style. In 1905 his music publishing business declared bankruptcy. He died the following year.

== Early life ==
=== Family background ===
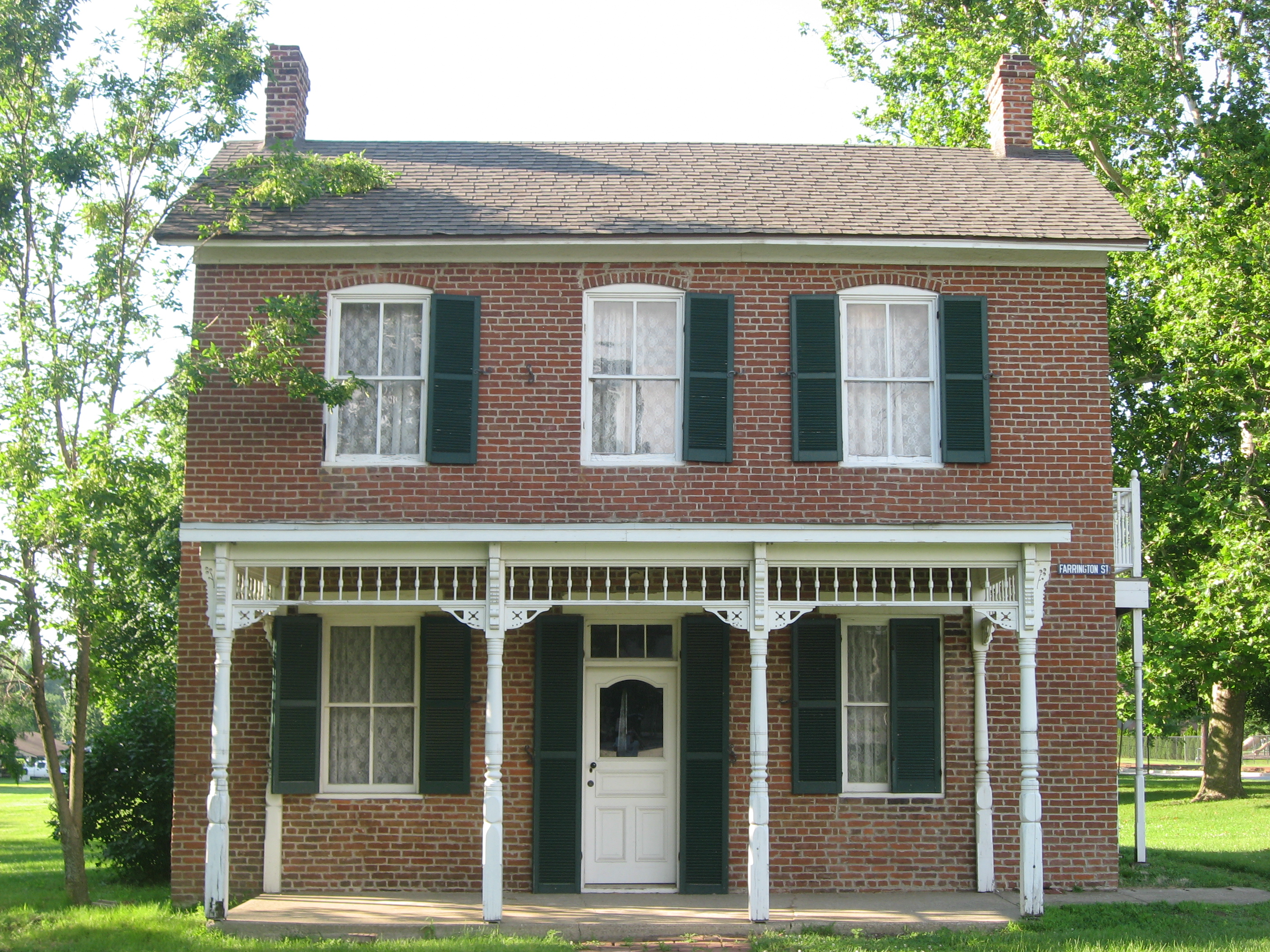
Paul Dresser Birthplace in Terre Haute, Indiana

Paul Dresser was born Johann Paul Dreiser Jr. on April 22, 1858, in Terre Haute, Indiana, the fourth son of Johann Paul and Sarah Mary Schanab Dreiser. By the age of twenty he had changed his surname to Dresser. His father, a German immigrant from Mayen, was a weaver and dyer who eventually became the manager of a woolen mill in Indiana. Dresser's mother, born near Dayton, Ohio, was a Mennonite who was disowned after her elopement and marriage. After Dresser's three older brothers died in infancy, he became the eldest of the family's ten surviving children. One of Dresser's sisters nicknamed him "Pudley" because of his "chubbiness." Dresser's younger brother, Theodore Dreiser, would become a noted author.

In July 1863 the family moved to Sullivan, Indiana, where Dresser's father became foreman of the newly opened Sullivan Woolen Mills. Although his father worked in other woolen mills in Ohio and Indiana, he was not a successful businessman or manager of a mill. During Dresser's youth the family struggled with periods of poverty and misfortune. In 1865 Dresser's father temporarily lost his job after a fire destroyed the Sullivan mill; a year later he suffered a work-related head injury. In 1867 his father and two partners purchased and operated a new mill, but the business lost its roof in a storm and the men sold it for a loss. As a young boy living in Sullivan, Dresser may have seen his first minstrel groups and medicine-wagon shows. The town was frequented by bands that played many of the era's popular and patriotic songs at numerous carnivals, festivals, circuses, and fairs. By 1871 Dresser's family had returned to Terre Haute, where his father secured a job in another woolen mill.

=== Education and rebellion ===
About 1870, Dresser's father, a devout Catholic and known for his "religious zealotry" according to his son Theodore, sent his eldest son to St. Meinrad Seminary in southern Indiana to study for the priesthood. While living with his family in Sullivan, Dresser was befriended by Father Herman Joseph Alerding, a local priest who was a St. Meinrad graduate. Alerding may have taught Dresser to play brass musical instruments and influenced the decision to send Dresser to seminary school. Dresser quickly found the Benedictine seminary too strict and confining and decided to leave. Dresser would later claim to have gotten into trouble with the priests for teaching the younger boys "tricks of various kinds." (Note: The story of Dresser's departure from school to join a group of traveling minstrels passing through the area is probably not at accurate one.)

Although his family had moved to Terre Haute, Dresser returned to Sullivan after he left St. Meinrad. He stayed with family friends while working on local farms during the summer of 1871 through the summer of 1872. The fourteen-year-old Dresser then returned to Terre Haute and worked a series of odd jobs to help support his family. (Note: Dresser worked in a distillery and as a butcher for the Evansville and Terre Haute Railroad. He also sold goods to train passengers. His other occupations included blacksmith and Modoc Oil salesman.) Dresser continued his education at the St. Bonaventure Lyceum academy in Terre Haute and took piano lessons from a local music teacher, his only formal musical training. During this time the relationship between Dresser and his father quickly deteriorated and the teen may have had run-ins with the local police. Whatever the reason, Dresser returned to Sullivan to work on a friend's farm, away from the city.

After his return to Terre Haute in 1874, Dresser and his father resumed their hostile relationship. Dresser also resumed to his old habits of spending time with delinquents and drinking. At age sixteen Dresser took a job as a teacher and musician at a Catholic church in Brazil, Indiana, but left after less than a year. (Note: After visiting a circus against the wishes of the church's priest, Dresser was presented with two options: return home and go to a house of correction or start a new life on his own. Dresser chose the latter, packed his belongings, and left.) Shortly thereafter, Charley Kelly, a traveling minstrel, hired Dresser to join his act as a piano player. The two traveled around southern Indiana, playing wherever they could to earn a meager income. After a few months, Kelly disappeared with their money during a show, leaving Dresser with no funds to pay their lodging or food bills. Dresser spent two days in jail as punishment. After his release Dresser went to Indianapolis in search of work and was reunited with his mentor, Father Alerding, who had been recently moved to the city. Although Dresser was only a teen, Alerding gave him a job as a teacher at St. Joseph Catholic Church. In 1876, after he had taught for a full year, Dresser returned to his family in Terre Haute. Almost immediately he resumed his old way of life and spent most of his savings on liquor at a local bar. As his money ran low, Dresser turned to crime, robbing two saloons of whiskey and cash after they had closed for the night. Dresser was jailed for ten weeks before his trial, convicted, fined, and sentenced to another month of jail time. Released in June 1876, Dresser, who was not yet twenty years old, returned to his parents' home in disgrace.

== Musical career ==
=== Early career ===
In 1876 Dresser secured a job as an organist and singer with the Lemon Brothers, a traveling minstrel group from Marshall, Illinois. Dresser stayed with the group for more than a year, performing as an actor and singer, before they disbanded near the end of 1877. Next, Dresser went to Chicago, where John Austin Hamlin hired him to sing and perform in his traveling shows marketing Wizard Oil, a patent medicine.> (Note: Fellow Hoosier, poet James Whitcomb Riley worked for a rival traveling medicine show at the time and the two may have met on the show circuit.) Dresser composed his first songs while working for Hamlin. They were marketed as the Paul Dresser Songster (a songbook of sheet music) and sold to audiences after his performances.

Few details are known of Dresser's life between 1878 and 1880. Around 1878 Dresser may have taken a job with Barlow, Wilson, Primrose, and West, a prominent traveling minstrel group that was among the most famous in the nation at the time. After traveling with minstrel shows, Dresser went to New York City around 1879. According to an 1898 interview, he hoped to find work in Augustin Daly's theatre. (Note: Dresser biographer Clayton Henderson indicates there is no evidence that Dresser ever performed in Daly's theater, also a prominent actors' schools of the time. Daly's students were frequently in shows on Broadway.) By 1881 Dresser had returned to Indiana and took a job at the Apollo Theatre in Evansville. At the Apollo he occasionally acted, but normally provided music for the plays.

=== Growing popularity ===
In Evansville, Dresser honed his skills as a musician and eventually became a nationally renowned talent. He also wrote a "humor-and-advice" column for a local newspaper, the Evansville Argus. By the time he left Evansville in 1886 he was "a local favorite" who toured the country giving performances. In March 1881 Dresser went to Chicago, where he headlined his own act. He also starred as one of the featured acts in a benefit concert for Daniel Decatur Emmett (the composer of "Dixie") at the Chicago Academy of Music. Dresser's act was a success and he was able to secure appearances in Boston, Philadelphia, and New York City as well as a number of smaller cities, including Indianapolis, Louisville, Cincinnati, and Pittsburgh.

Between shows Dresser returned to Evansville, where he had purchased a home. In 1882 he visited his family, whom he had not communicated with in more than three years. Through correspondence, Dresser learned they were in a desperate financial situation. His father and the family's older children were living in Terre Haute, while his mother and the younger children worked on a farm in Sullivan. Known for his generosity, Dresser sent his mother a substantial sum of money and arranged for his three youngest siblings to move into his Evansville home and took care of their needs.

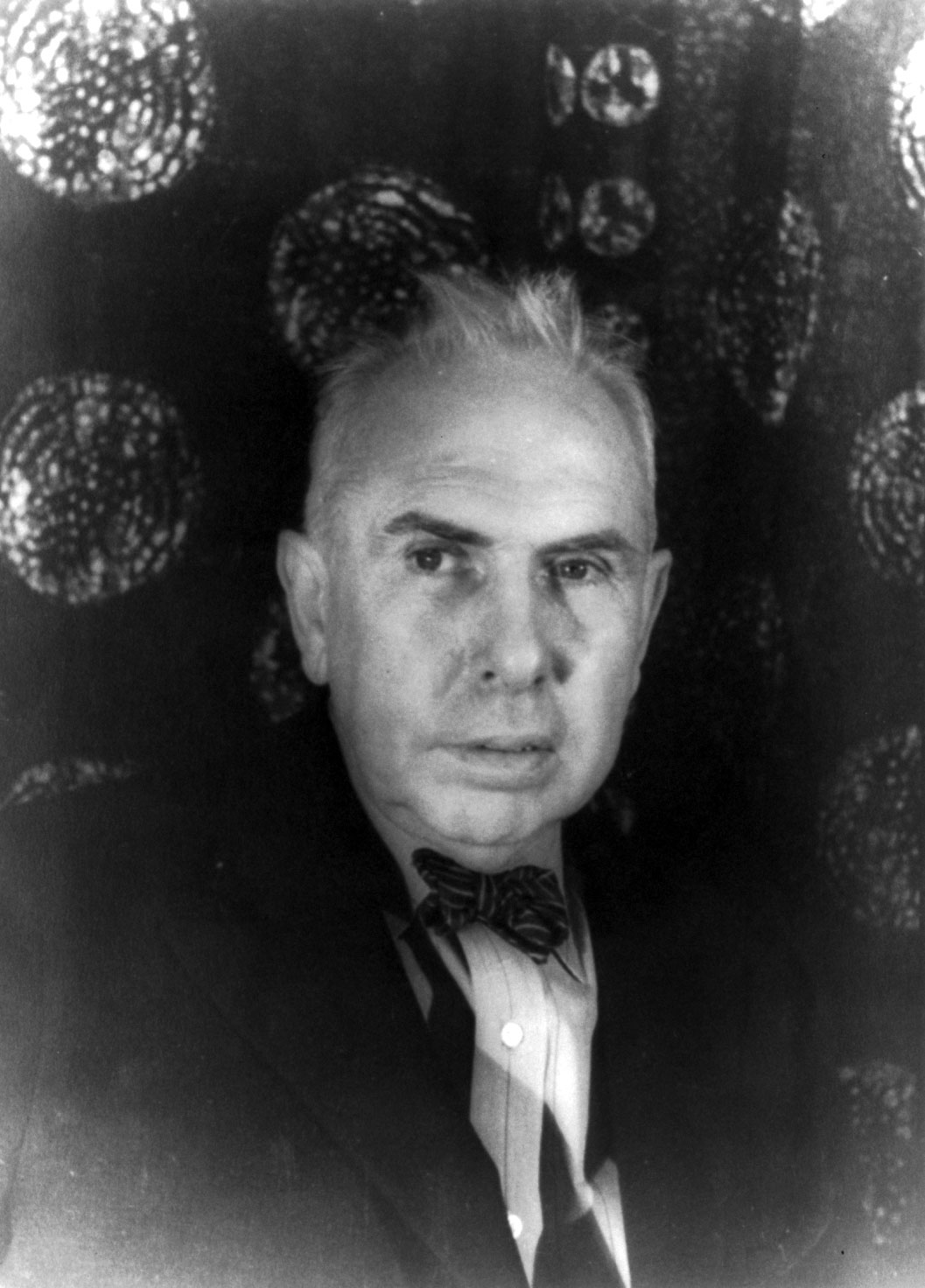
Dresser's younger brother, the famous novelist Theodore Dreiser

Because Dresser kept no diary, most of what is known about his personal life came from his brother, Theodore. While living in Evansville, Dresser began a long-term relationship with a local woman, whom Theodore identified as Annie Brace, the proprietor of Evansville's most prominent brothel. Her professional name was Sallie Walker and she may have been the subject of one of Dresser's most famous songs, "My Gal Sal". Historians believe that Annie Brace and Sallie Walker may have both been aliases for Minnie Holland, although this has not been confirmed. The relationship continued for several years, but the couple never married. In 1889 they had a falling out because of Dresser's frequent affairs with other women, including prostitutes.

In the early 1880s Dresser worked with a group of vaudeville performers, including James Goodwin, John Leach, and Emma Lamouse. Their shows in Chicago attracted very large audiences, in part because the theater's owner kept admission fees low. In 1883 Dresser had his first songs published as sheet music since his time working with Hamlin. "Essie, over the Sea", "See That No One Plucks the Flowers from My Grave", and "My Mother Taught Me How to Pray" were supposedly published by Arthur P. Schmidt; however, one of Dresser's biographers reported that "1886 is the first year in which a published Dresser song can be documented."

Few details are known of the period from late 1883 to the summer of 1886. In 1884 Dresser claimed to have an undisclosed illness. For two years he remained in the "south", away from his family and career. His brother Theodore speculated that Dresser may have had an affair and possibly fathered a child or he contracted syphilis. Dresser's song “The Curse”, written in 1887, may have referred to this period in his life. Its lyrics refer to a dead child and a lover turned enemy. Whatever the case, Dresser did not return to his family or resume performing for the public until 1886, when John Stewart Crossy approached him to act and sing music in his comedy, The Two Johns. Dresser agreed and resumed traveling the show circuit. (Note: Dresser and Crossy were both large men and much of their show was built around comedic references to their weight.)

Dresser continued to compose music during the height of his performing career. Between 1886 and 1893 he published nearly fifty songs, including "The Letter That Never Came" (1886), "I Believe It for My Mother Told Me So" (1887), and "The Pardon that Came Too Late" (1891). These early successes may have encouraged Dresser to pursue songwriting rather than performing. In addition, he may have realized that publishing music would provide even more financial success than composing or performing.

== National fame ==
=== Move to Tin Pan Alley ===
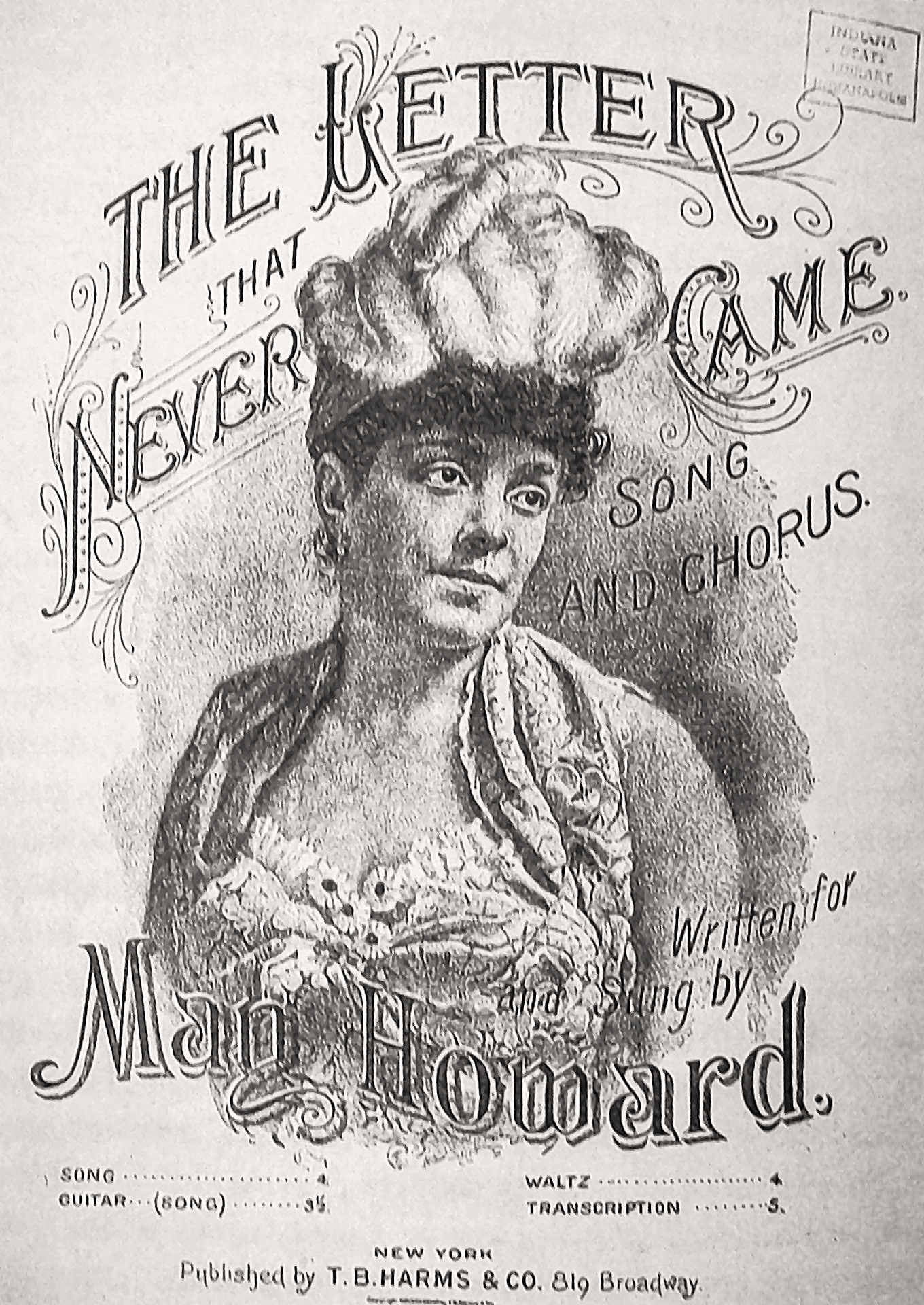
The disputed sheet music cover of "The Letter That Never Came"

By 1888 Dresser believed his songs would have popular appeal to a national audience. He stopped selling his songs through midwestern publishers, moved to New York City, and turned to Willis Woodward and Company, a New York City music publisher located in the area that later became known as Tin Pan Alley. Woodward and Company printed "nearly three dozen" of Dresser's songs. Dresser continued traveling with The Two Johns show until the end of 1889 and composed music after the show season ended. In 1890 Dresser began performing in A Tin Soldier. Managed by Frank McKee, the Charles Hale Hoyt production was in its fourth season when Dresser joined the twelve-member cast. (Note: Hoyt was among the country's top writers of "farce-comedies" at that time.) Dresser, who had been large since his youth and weighed nearly 300 pounds (140 kg), performed as a jolly plumber in the nationally acclaimed show. "Days Gone By" and other Dresser songs were included in the show. He began to have a dispute with Hoyt over the use of his songs, and Hoyt's refusal to acknowledge him as the composer. Dresser left the act in April 1891 and traveled the country performing in The Danger Signal. Dresser also began to sell his songs to other acts for use in their performances. After they made his songs famous, Dresser would then publish the sheet music and sell them through the firms on Tin Pan Alley. Dresser's songs and acts were usually sad and melodramatic, but a few were romantic and silly.

=== Howley, Haviland and Company ===
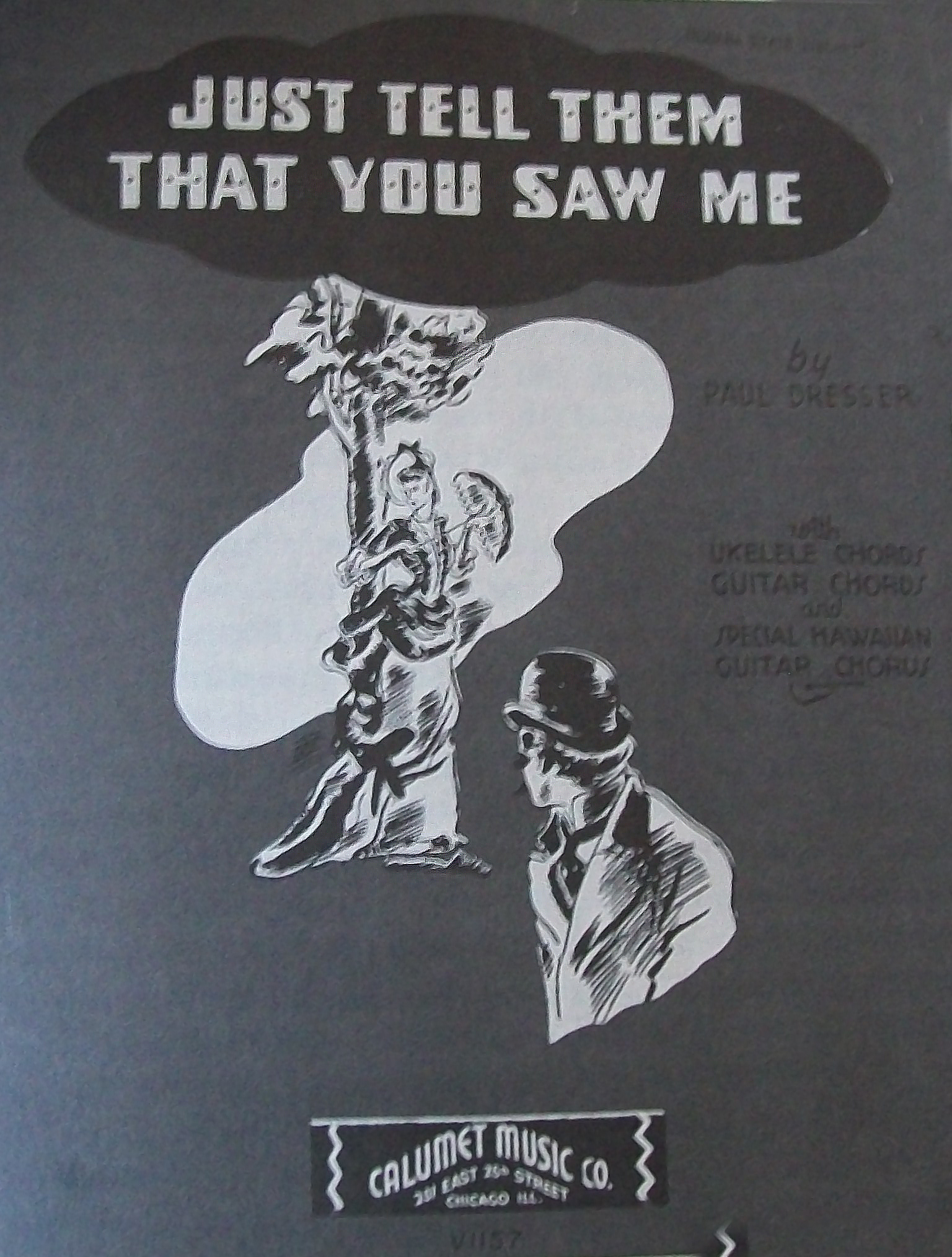
The sheet music cover for "Just Tell Them That You Saw Me", 1895

At the height of the Panic of 1893, Dresser formed a partnership with Frederick Haviland and Patrick Howley as a silent partner in Howley, Haviland and Company. The New York City firm published Dresser's works, while he recruited new songwriters and encouraged singers to perform the company's songs. Dresser stopped traveling and performing during the summer so he could focus on composing music and promoting the new company. In 1894 he invited his younger brother Theodore to join him in New York. Theodore went to work for Howley, Haviland and Company as editor of the firm's trade journal, Ev'ry Month, which promoted their newest songs. Theodore later became a nationally known novelist. During their time together in New York, the brothers frequented Broadway theaters, popular restaurants, and hotel bars as well as the city's brothels and saloons.

In the mid-1890s Dresser began composing his most famous songs, including "Just Tell Them That You Saw Me" (1895). Dresser's songs, along with others published by Howley, Haviland and Company, were included in the top minstrel acts and shows around the country. Dresser's success continued with "We Were Sweethearts for Many Years" (1895), "Lost, Strayed or Stolen" (1896), and his most famous hit, "On the Banks of the Wabash, Far Away" (1897), which took Dresser's career to its pinnacle. In "Wabash" Dresser reminisced about his childhood home in Indiana, which was near the Wabash River. With the success of "Wabash", many newspapers compared Dresser to popular music composer Stephen Foster. When asked what inspired him to compose the song, Dresser replied, "The same sweet memory that inspired that other Hoosier, James Whitcomb Riley, to sing the 'Old Swimmin' Hole." The location of where the song was written is referenced in a short story in The Atlantic by Elizabeth Stuckey-French. She wrote, "Paul Dresser wrote 'On the Banks of the Wabash' at Mudlavia."

For a period Dresser was the most famous composer in the nation. Wabash was the best selling song of its time in terms of sheet music sold; over one million copies had been sold in the first year. The Chicago Record reported that "Wabash" "has had the most enormous sale of any popular song." Newspapers reported that Dresser earned over $50,000 ($1,555,400 in 2020 dollars) in the first year of sales; Dresser boasted that he made far more than their estimates. Popularity of the song continued for several years. In August 1898, the song was still selling over 10,000 copies a week. One music historian attributed "Wabash"'s success to the "perfect marriage of words and music", where the flow of the music matches the words in a perfect fashion. Millions of people sang this popular song in the U.S. It was a featured song in music halls, on vaudeville stages, and in male quartet performances across the country. In addition, the song's popularity spread internationally to places frequented by American travelers. Other songwriters wrote comic parodies of Dresser's songs as well. For example, at the outbreak of the Spanish–American War, a folk version of "Wabash" with different lyrics began circulating. "On the Banks of Havana, Far Away" ridiculed the war. In 1902 the song was so well known that after power outage at the arena on Coney Island left thousands of people in the dark, the entire crowd sang "Wabash" to prevent a panic while repairmen fixed the lighting. In 1913 "Wabash" became the official state song of Indiana.

In 1900, with selling sheet music copies "Wabash" still selling "extremely well", Howley, Haviland and Company opened a new and larger office in New York City. In addition, the firm had offices in Chicago and San Francisco and representation in Toronto and London. Dresser also contributed to a book on composing music, Hits and Hitters: Secrets of the Music Publishing Business.

== Later life ==
=== Fall from fame ===
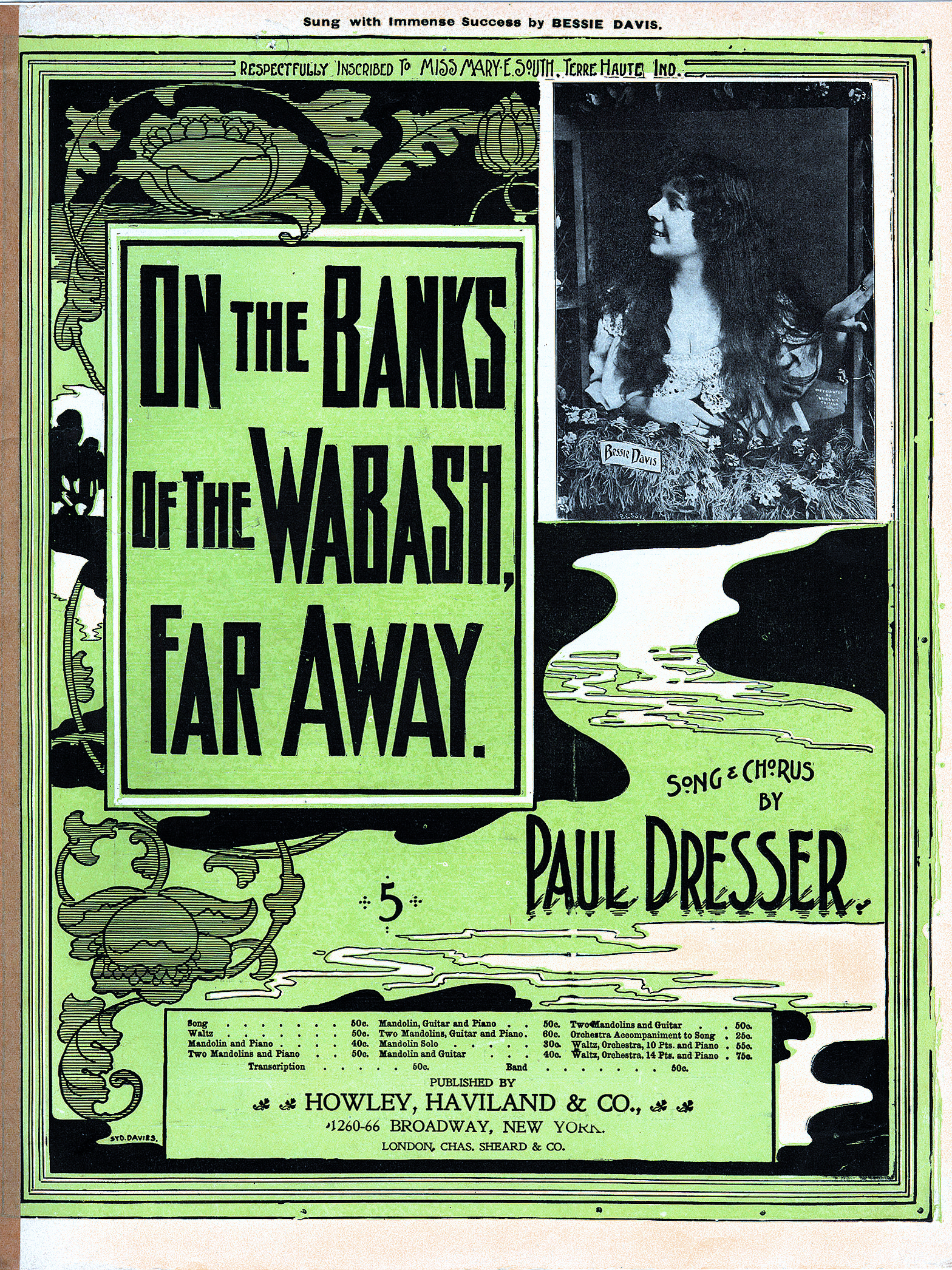
A c. 1902 recording of the song by Paul Dresser, sung by Harry MacDonough

"On the Bank of the Wabash, Far Away"

As the nineteenth century ended, American taste in popular music turned to less sentimental fare: patriotic songs, ragtime (more syncopated African-American styles than the minstrel songs and cakewalks), union and labor songs, and songs created for and derived from the more recent ethnic immigrant communities. At the same time, a new group of writers and composers began to dominate Tin Pan Alley and the explosive growth in recorded music soon dwarfed sheet music sales. Despite these changes Dresser continued to write in his own genre, known as "mother-and-home" songs to later generations. In 1900 Dresser published one of his last hit songs, "The Blue and the Gray". Although Dresser's songs were popularized by Richard Jose and others, his music was falling out of style. Sales of his music quickly decreased.

In 1900, although he was not a competent businessman, Dresser became an acting partner in his publishing business, which was renamed Howley, Haviland, and Dresser. His partners hoped Dresser's name would help spur more business, but the enterprise was not a success. Haviland left the partnership in 1903. Dresser continued to write songs, but none brought the financial success that the business needed to survive. In 1905 the Howley and Dresser partnership declared bankruptcy. Determined to continue as a music publisher, Dresser established the Paul Dresser Company with money borrowed from his brother, Ed, but this venture failed as well.

According to one biographer, Dresser's generosity "had few limits". In December 1900, Dresser's father died. Although the two had not been close, Dresser wrote a poem in his father's honor. In addition, Dresser gave money to "tramps, hangers-on, and to those who were simply down on their luck." He also helped support his siblings, including his brother, Theodore. Dresser began giving out money to his friends to help them. Despite his falling income, Dresser continued to spend liberally. He gave away large sums of money to his friends and family, spent vast sums at the city's brothels and saloons, and by 1903 he was nearly impoverished. Without the means to support himself, Dresser was unable to continue his lifestyle in New York City. In addition, his obesity made it difficult for him to attract women, leaving him depressed and alone. (Note: Dresser tried a variety of diets, including only drinking milk for sustenance for nearly a month, and his radical diets had some success—he claimed to have weighed 285 pounds (129 kg) by 1905, a loss of more than 75 pounds (34 kg) from his peak weight.)

=== Death ===
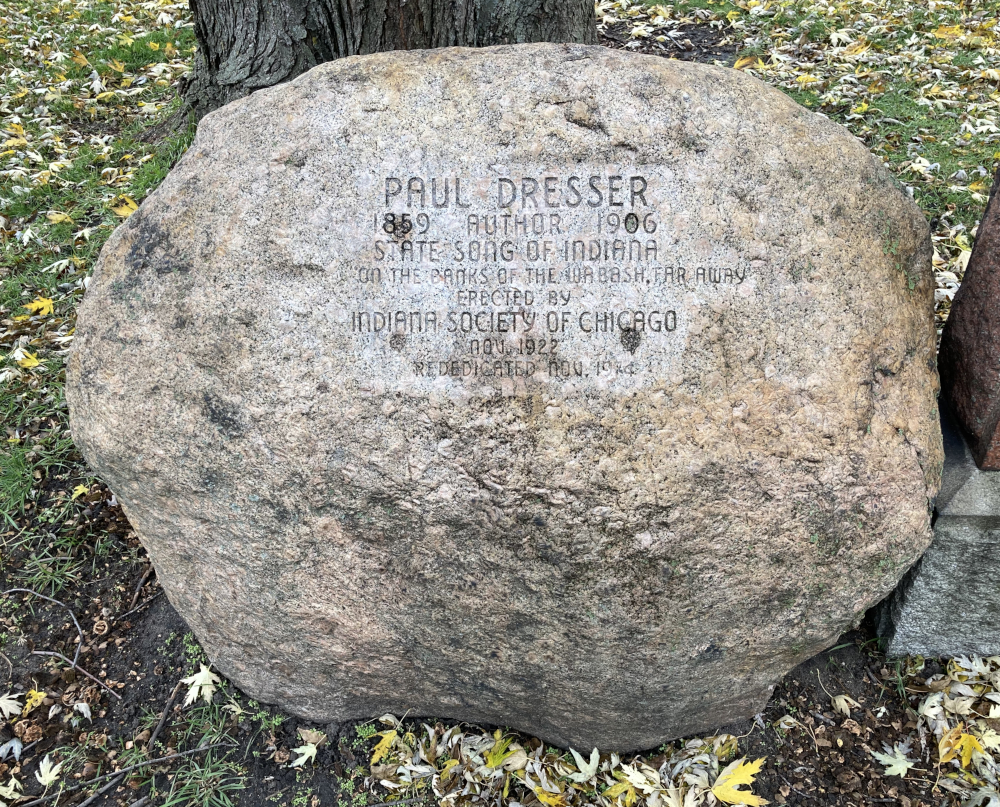
Dresser's grave at St. Boniface Cemetery

Dresser's health began to deteriorate rapidly at the end of 1905, when he wrote to his sister that he was ill, but gave no details. After his finances finally gave out, Dresser was forced to leave the hotel where he was living and move to his sister's and brother-in-law's home in New York City. Dresser died at their home on January 30, 1906, at 6:23 p.m., from a brain hemorrhage. He also suffered from alcoholism, obesity, and depression. A funeral was held in New York City on February 2, but because Dresser died penniless, his remains were held at Calvary Cemetery on Long Island until his funeral bill was paid. On March 19 Dresser's remains were moved to St. Boniface Cemetery in Chicago, where a funeral and final burial took place on November 23, 1907. With no funds to purchase a memorial stone, Dresser's grave remained unmarked until 1922, when the Indiana Society of Chicago had a boulder from the banks of the Wabash River brought to Chicago to mark his burial site.

== Legacy ==
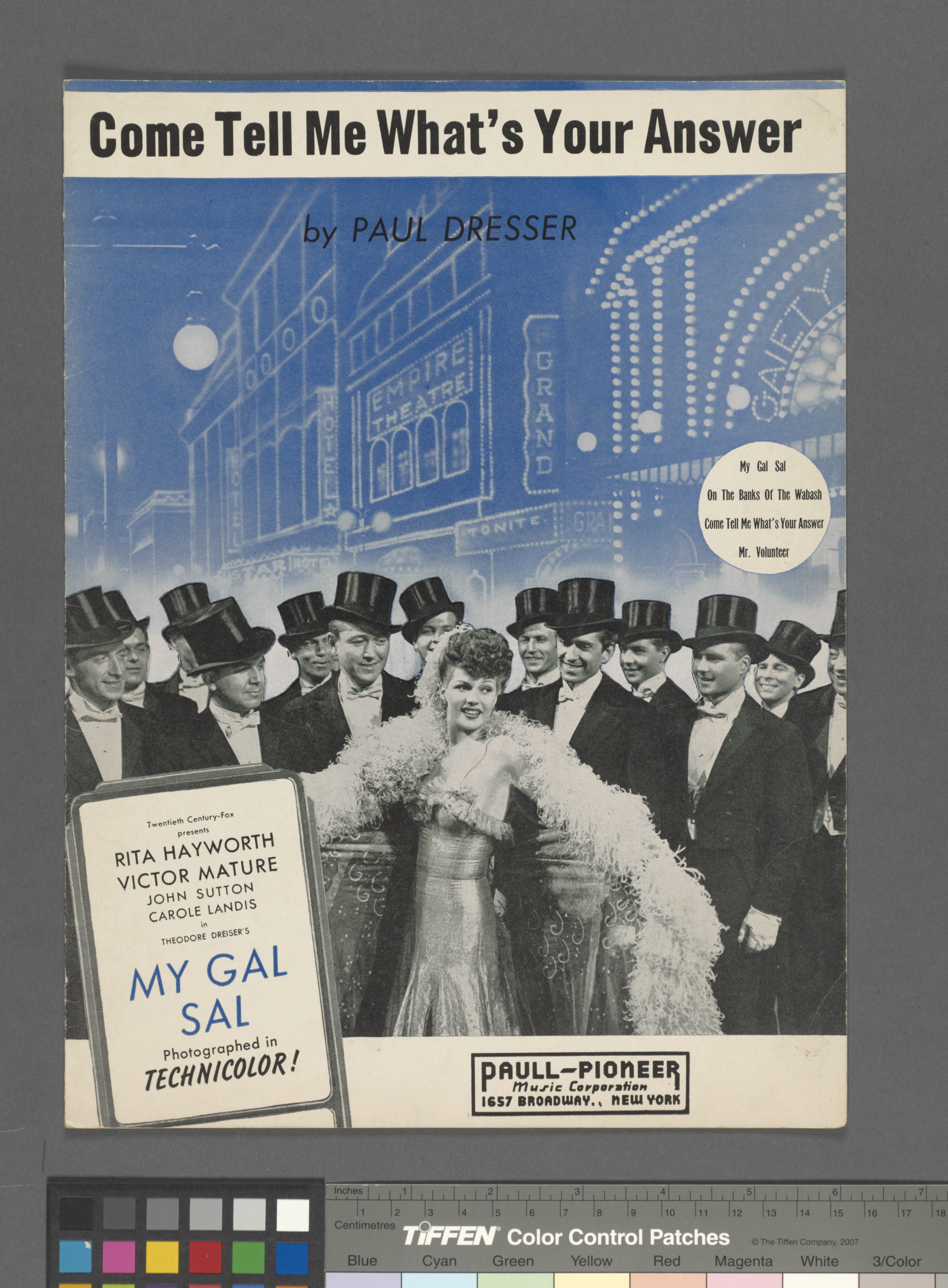
Sheet music for one of Dresser's songs used in the biopic My Gal Sal (1942)

Dresser's most significant legacy is his music. Although Dresser had no formal training in music composition, he wrote ballads that had wide popular appeal, especially home-and-mother songs and songs of lost sweethearts and dead heroes. Warm and "genuinely tender", they represented a middle-class perspective. While Dresser's melodies and lyrics were often sad, they could also be "spirited and bubbly" or "emotional and sentimental" with a "wide and enduring appeal". (Note: Theodore Dreiser, introduction to The Songs of Paul Dresser, by Paul Dresser (New York: Boni & Liveright, 1927), p. x.) Newspaper and magazine columnist H. L. Mencken remarked that it is a "high honor to write songs that a hundred million people all know and all love" in a reference to Dresser's work. (Note: Mencken also reported that during the 1920 Democratic Party's national convention in San Francisco, the convention's bandleader began playing "The Sidewalks of New York" after New York governor Al Smith's name was put into nomination for U.S. president. Within minutes the convention's delegates were on their feet to join in an impromptu sing-along that included many of Dresser's songs. See Holley, pp. 9–10.)

The Indiana General Assembly named his most famous song, "On the Banks of the Wabash", as the state song on March 14, 1913. In total, Dresser composed and published more than 150 songs and also left behind several unpublished compositions. His last work was "The Judgment Day is Coming", published posthumously in 1906. (Note: A list of Dresser's songs is available from the Songwriters Hall of Fame Virtual Museum: Paul Dresser Song List. Retrieved 2013-01-31.) Dresser was inducted into the Songwriters Hall of Fame in 1970 and is described as one of the "most important composers of the 1890s."

The Paul Dresser Memorial Association was established in 1922, but their plans for an elaborate memorial in Vigo County, near Terre Haute, were never fully realized. In Terre Haute, Paul Dresser Drive is named in his honor. The Paul Dresser Birthplace is maintained at Henry Fairbanks Park in Terre Haute by the Vigo County Historical Society. In 1967 the Indiana General Assembly designated the home as a state shrine and memorial. The property is listed on the National Register of Historic Places and the National Music Council lists the home as "A Landmark of American Music". The village of Dresser, also called Taylorville, is situated on the west bank of the Wabash River in Vigo County and was also named for the songwriter.

Dresser Drive, a street in the Forest Hills neighborhood of Anderson, Indiana, is named for him, as is the Dresser Bridge, which crosses the Wabash River, near Attica, Indiana.

Actor Victor Mature portrayed Dresser in the musical film My Gal Sal (1942). The plot bears little resemblance to Dresser's life, and songs actually written by Dresser are mingled with songs attributed to him in the film but written for the movie by Harry Dacre, Ralph Rainger and Leo Robin. Dresser's works in the film include: "Come Tell Me What's Your Answer, Yes or No", "I'se Your Honey If You Wants Me, Liza Jane", "On the Banks of the Wabash", "The Convict and the Bird", "My Gal Sal", and "Mr. Volunteer (You Don't Belong to the Regulars, You're Just a Volunteer)".

Theodore Dreiser wrote a biographical sketch of his elder brother's life in Twelve Men, published in 1919. An academic study of Dresser's life, On the Banks of the Wabash, Far Away: The Life and Music of Paul Dresser by Clayton W. Henderson, was published by the Indiana Historical Society Press in 2003.

== Sources ==
- Dowell, Richard W. (June 1970). "'On the Banks of the Wabash': A Musical Whodunit". Indiana Magazine of History. 66 (2). Bloomington and Indianapolis: Indiana University: 95–109.
- Dresser, Paul (1927). The Songs of Paul Dresser. New York: Boni & Liveright.
- Henderson, Clayton W. (2003). On the Banks of the Wabash: The Life and Music of Paul Dresser. Indianapolis: Indiana Historical Society Press. ISBN 0-87195-166-5.
- Sadie, Stanley, ed. (1980). The New Grove Dictionary of Music and Musicians. Vol. 5. Washington, D.C.: Grove's Dictionaries of Music.
- Woodburn, James Albert, ed. (June 1931). Indiana Magazine of History. Vol. XXXVI. Indiana University Press.
