= The Blue and the Gray =

The Blue and the Gray or variants may refer to:

== Geography ==
- Blue & Grey District, a Scouting district in Pennsylvania
- Blue and Gray Museum (Georgia), in Fitzgerald, Georgia
- Blue and Gray Museum (Alabama), in Decatur, Alabama

== Military and school colors ==
- U.S. Civil War, a reference to the predominant color of the uniforms worn by soldiers on either side.
- 29th Infantry Division (United States), the "Blue and Gray"
- Blue and Gray (Georgetown), the school colors of Georgetown University

== Entertainment ==
- The Blue and the Gray (miniseries)
- "The Blue and the Gray" (song), a song composed by Paul Dresser
- "The Blue and the Gray" (The Simpsons), television episode
- "The Blue and the Grey" (Wild Kratts), television episode
- Blue & Gray, 2003 album by The United States Coast Guard Band
- The blue and the gray, 1898 book by Annie Randall White
- The Blue and the Gray, 1996 children's picture book by Eve Bunting
- Blue and Gray (board game), an abstract strategy board game
- Blue and Gray (album), a 1981 country rock album by Poco
- "Blue & Grey" (song), a song by BTS from Be
- Blue & Gray: Four American Civil War Battles, a 1975 wargame by Simulations Publications Inc. (SPI)
- Blue & Gray II, a 1975 wargame by Simulations Publications Inc. (SPI)
- Blugray, internet alias of Alexey Gerasimov, creator of the Skibidi Toilet web series

== Blue-gray color ==
- Blue-gray, a color
  - RAL 7031 Blue grey, a RAL color
- Blue Grey cattle, a breed of beef cattle
- Bluegray mbuna (Melanochromis johannii), a fish
- Bluegrey carpetshark (Brachaelurus colcloughi), a shark
- Blue-gray mouse (Pseudomys glaucus), an extinct mouse
- Blue-grey tanager (Thraupis episcopus), a songbird
- Blue-grey gnatcatcher (Polioptila caerulea), a songbird
- Blue-grey noddy (Procelsterna cerulea), a tern (bird)
- Blue Grey River, a river in New Zealand
- Project A-ko: Grey Side/Blue Side, cartoon anime OVA
- Blue–Gray Football Classic, U.S. college American football all-star game
- Bluefield Blue–Grays, baseball team

== See also ==
- Blue (disambiguation)
- Gray (disambiguation)
- Blue and Gray Museum (disambiguation)
