= Ben Hill County, Georgia =

County in Georgia, United States

- County
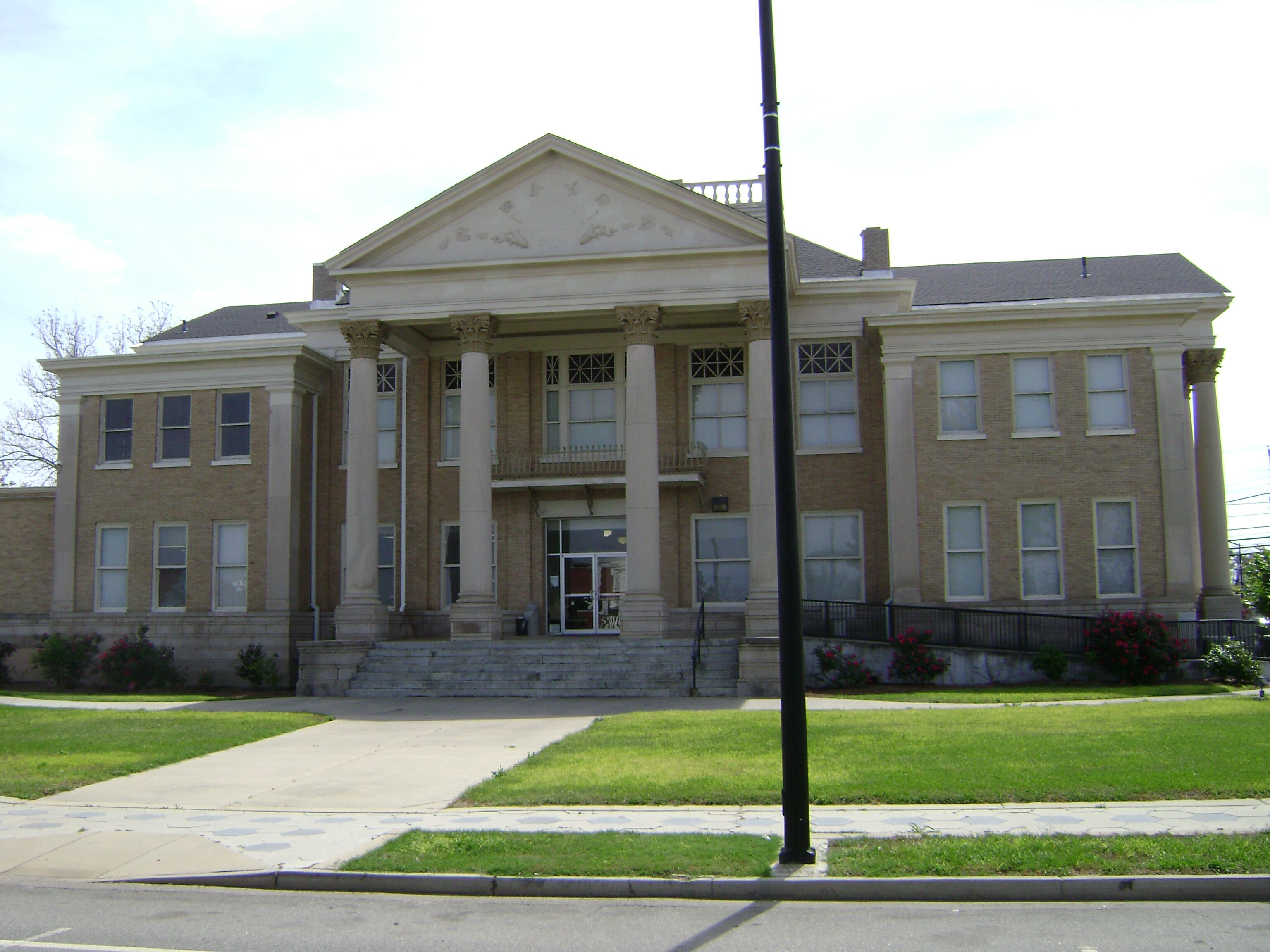
- Ben Hill County Courthouse, Fitzgerald

- Seal

- Location within the U.S. state of Georgia
- Coordinates: 31°46′N 83°13′W
- Country: United States
- State: Georgia
- Founded: 1906; 120 years ago
- Named for: Benjamin Harvey Hill
- Seat: Fitzgerald
- Largest city: Fitzgerald

Area
  - Total: 254 sq mi (660 km^{2})
  - Land: 250 sq mi (650 km^{2})
  - Water: 3.8 sq mi (9.8 km^{2}) 1.5%

Population (2020)
  - Total: 17,194
  - Estimate (2025): 17,099 ▼
  - Density: 69/sq mi (27/km^{2})
- Time zone: UTC−5 (Eastern)
  - Summer (DST): UTC−4 (EDT)
- Congressional district: 8th
- Website: benhillcounty-ga.gov

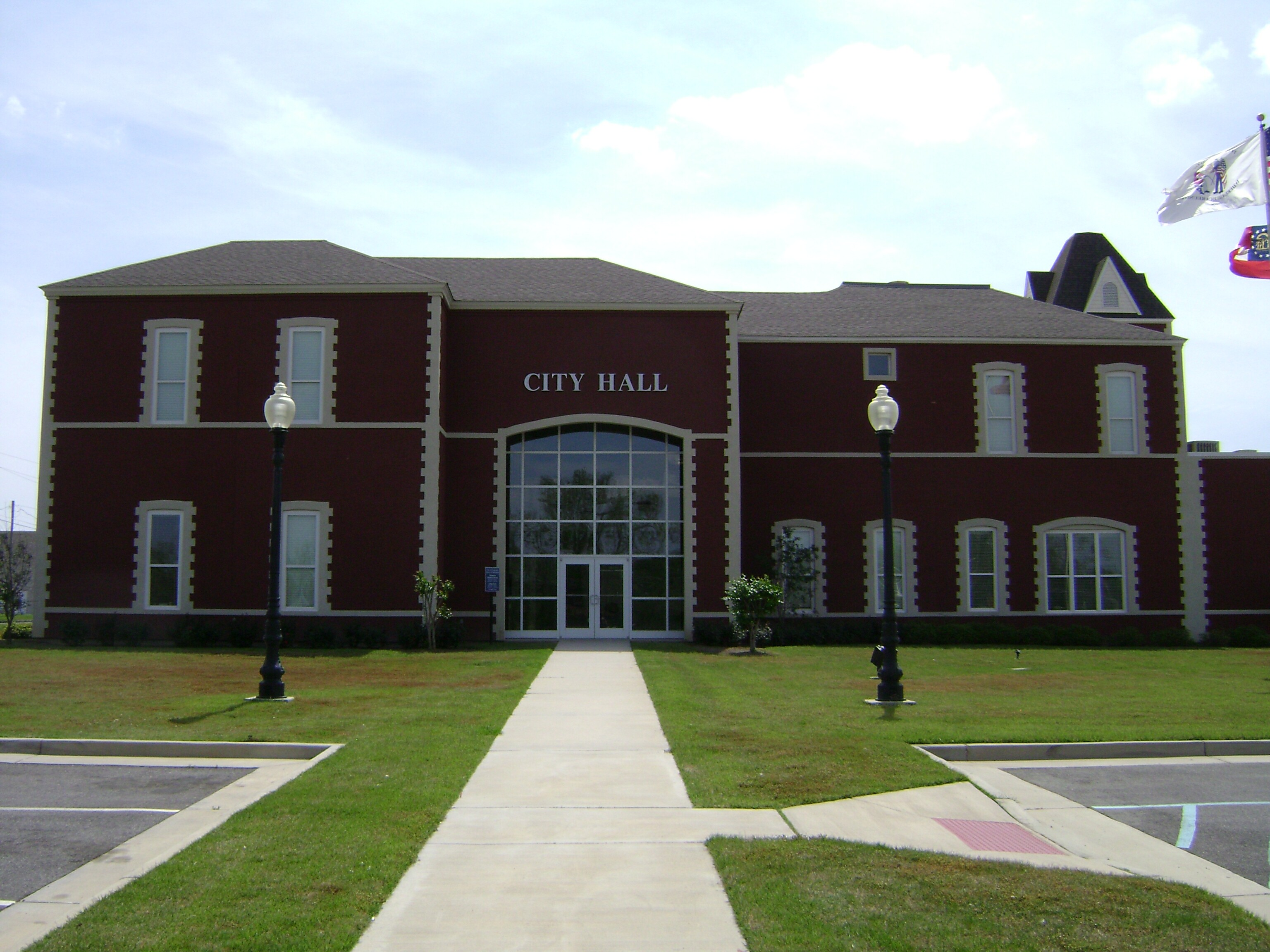
Fitzgerald City Hall

Ben Hill County is a county located in the U.S. state of Georgia. As of the 2020 census, the population was 17,194. The county seat is Fitzgerald. The county was organized in 1906. It is named after Benjamin Harvey Hill, a former Confederate and United States Senator.

Ben Hill County comprises the Fitzgerald micropolitan statistical area. The area also included Irwin County until the 2023 OMB statistical area updates when the county was removed.

The Ben Hill County Courthouse and Ben Hill County Jail are listed on the National Register of Historic Places.

== History ==
Ben Hill County was organized in 1906. It was created from Irwin and Wilcox counties.

== Geography ==
According to the U.S. Census Bureau, the county has a total area of 254 square miles (660 km^{2}), of which 250 square miles (650 km^{2}) is land and 3.8 square miles (9.8 km^{2}) (1.5%) is water.

The majority of Ben Hill County, its northern and eastern portions, are located in the Lower Ocmulgee River sub-basin of the Altamaha River basin. The northwestern corner of the county, east of Rebecca, is located in the Alapaha River sub-basin of the Suwannee River basin. The southeastern corner of the county, east of Fitzgerald, is located in the Satilla River sub-basin of the St. Marys-Satilla River basin. Ben Hill County is part of the Southeast Georgia region.

=== Major highways ===
- U.S. Route 129 / State Route 11
- U.S. Route 319
- State Route 90
- State Route 107
- State Route 125
- State Route 182
- State Route 206
- State Route 215
- State Route 233

=== Adjacent counties ===
- Wilcox County - north
- Telfair County - northeast
- Coffee County - east
- Irwin County - south
- Turner County - west

=== Communities ===
==== City ====
- Fitzgerald (county seat)

==== Unincorporated communities ====
- Bowen's Mill
- Queensland

== Demographics ==
Historical population
Census	Pop.	Note	%±
1910	11,863		—
1920	14,599		23.1%
1930	13,047		−10.6%
1940	14,523		11.3%
1950	14,879		2.5%
1960	13,633		−8.4%
1970	13,171		−3.4%
1980	16,000		21.5%
1990	16,245		1.5%
2000	17,484		7.6%
2010	17,634		0.9%
2020	17,194		−2.5%
2025 (est.)	17,099	▼	−0.6%
U.S. Decennial Census; 1790-1880 1890-1910; 1920-1930 1930-1940; 1940-1950 1960-1980; 1980-2000 2010

As of the 2000 census, the Fitzgerald micropolitan area (which included Irwin County at the time) had a population of 27,415 (though a July 1, 2009 estimate placed the population at 27,653).

=== Racial and ethnic composition ===
County, Georgia – Racial and ethnic composition Note: the US Census treats Hispanic/Latino as an ethnic category. This table excludes Latinos from the racial categories and assigns them to a separate category. Hispanics/Latinos may be of any race.
Race / Ethnicity (NH = Non-Hispanic)	Pop 1980	Pop 1990	Pop 2000	Pop 2010	Pop 2020	% 1980	% 1990	% 2000	% 2010	% 2020
White alone (NH)	11,096	11,047	10,818	10,164	9,219	69.35%	68.00%	61.87%	57.64%	53.62%
Black or African American alone (NH)	4,793	5,068	5,673	6,087	6,222	29.96%	31.20%	32.45%	34.52%	36.19%
Native American or Alaska Native alone (NH)	17	16	31	47	57	0.11%	0.10%	0.18%	0.27%	0.33%
Asian alone (NH)	7	34	49	120	116	0.04%	0.21%	0.28%	0.68%	0.67%
Native Hawaiian or Pacific Islander alone (NH)	x	x	0	2	0	x	x	0.00%	0.01%	0.00%
Other race alone (NH)	5	2	5	15	48	0.03%	0.01%	0.03%	0.09%	0.28%
Mixed race or Multiracial (NH)	x	x	108	173	478	x	x	0.62%	0.98%	2.78%
Hispanic or Latino (any race)	82	78	800	1,026	1,054	0.51%	0.48%	4.58%	5.82%	6.13%
Total	16,000	16,245	17,484	17,634	17,194	100.00%	100.00%	100.00%	100.00%	100.00%

=== 2020 census ===
As of the 2020 census, the county had a population of 17,194; there were 4,019 families residing in the county. Of the residents, 23.4% were under the age of 18 and 18.9% were 65 years of age or older; the median age was 41.1 years. For every 100 females there were 90.8 males, and for every 100 females age 18 and over there were 88.2 males. 65.6% of residents lived in urban areas and 34.4% lived in rural areas.

The racial makeup of the county was 54.9% White, 36.4% Black or African American, 0.4% American Indian and Alaska Native, 0.7% Asian, 0.0% Native Hawaiian and Pacific Islander, 3.2% from some other race, and 4.4% from two or more races. Hispanic or Latino residents of any race comprised 6.1% of the population.

There were 7,074 households in the county, of which 29.4% had children under the age of 18 living with them and 35.6% had a female householder with no spouse or partner present. About 31.6% of all households were made up of individuals and 14.1% had someone living alone who was 65 years of age or older.

There were 8,124 housing units, of which 12.9% were vacant. Among occupied housing units, 58.5% were owner-occupied and 41.5% were renter-occupied. The homeowner vacancy rate was 1.9% and the rental vacancy rate was 5.9%.

=== 2010 census ===
In 2010, there were 17,634 people, 6,794 households, and 4,730 families living in the county.

In 2010, the median income for a household in the county was $30,134 and the median income for a family was $35,868. Males had a median income of $32,613 versus $23,320 for females. The per capita income for the county was $15,529. About 22.7% of families and 26.9% of the population were below the poverty line, including 39.0% of those under age 18 and 16.3% of those age 65 or over.

=== 2000 census ===
In 2000, there were 17,484 people, 6,673 households, and 4,631 families living in the county. The population density was 69 inhabitants per square mile (27/km^{2}). There were 7,623 housing units at an average density of 30 per square mile (12/km^{2}).

In 2000, the median income for a household in the county was $27,100, and the median income for a family was $33,023. Males had a median income of $26,750 versus $19,547 for females. The per capita income for the county was $14,093. 22.30% of the population and 18.70% of families were below the poverty line. Out of the total people living in poverty, 33.30% are under the age of 18 and 17.60% are 65 or older.

=== 2022 American Community Survey ===
According to the 2022 American Community Survey, the county's median household income was $38,255 with a per capita income of $22,625. An estimated 26.5% of the county lived at or below the poverty line.

=== Religion ===
Religiously, the Association of Religion Data Archives in 2020 denoted Christianity as the predominant religion, being part of the Bible Belt. Among its Christian population, the majority formed the Southern Baptist Convention, and the Baptist tradition was the county's dominant Christian affiliation. The National Baptist Convention, USA was the second-largest Baptist denomination in County. One notable non-Christian religion for the county has been the Baha'i Faith.

== Education ==
The Ben Hill County School District operates schools serving the county.

- Ben Hill Preschool
- Ben Hill County Primary School
- Ben Hill County Elementary School
- Ben Hill County Middle School
- Fitzgerald High School

== Politics ==
As of the 2020s, Ben Hill County is a strongly Republican voting county, voting 65.85% for Donald Trump in 2024. For elections to the United States House of Representatives, Ben Hill County is part of Georgia's 8th congressional district. For elections to the Georgia State Senate, Ben Hill County is part of Georgia's 13th Senate district. For elections to the Georgia House of Representatives, Ben Hill County is part of districts 148 and 156.

United States presidential election results for Ben Hill County, Georgia
Year	Republican		Democratic		Third party(ies)	
Year	No.	%	No.	%	No.	%
1912	263	31.61%	535	64.30%	34	4.09%
1916	134	17.43%	627	81.53%	8	1.04%
1920	232	29.94%	543	70.06%	0	0.00%
1924	150	17.71%	507	59.86%	190	22.43%
1928	460	31.38%	1,006	68.62%	0	0.00%
1932	85	7.62%	1,026	91.94%	5	0.45%
1936	146	11.28%	1,147	88.64%	1	0.08%
1940	181	13.00%	1,206	86.64%	5	0.36%
1944	190	15.36%	1,046	84.56%	1	0.08%
1948	223	11.76%	1,438	75.84%	235	12.39%
1952	697	25.39%	2,048	74.61%	0	0.00%
1956	554	20.49%	2,150	79.51%	0	0.00%
1960	558	22.88%	1,881	77.12%	0	0.00%
1964	2,089	57.82%	1,523	42.15%	1	0.03%
1968	661	19.61%	877	26.02%	1,833	54.38%
1972	2,104	74.96%	703	25.04%	0	0.00%
1976	814	24.95%	2,449	75.05%	0	0.00%
1980	1,459	35.87%	2,544	62.55%	64	1.57%
1984	2,313	55.44%	1,859	44.56%	0	0.00%
1988	2,005	51.17%	1,867	47.65%	46	1.17%
1992	1,476	33.06%	2,348	52.60%	640	14.34%
1996	1,516	37.08%	2,198	53.77%	374	9.15%
2000	2,381	51.08%	2,234	47.93%	46	0.99%
2004	3,331	60.07%	2,180	39.31%	34	0.61%
2008	3,417	56.46%	2,590	42.80%	45	0.74%
2012	3,396	56.88%	2,512	42.08%	62	1.04%
2016	3,739	62.99%	2,101	35.39%	96	1.62%
2020	4,111	62.63%	2,393	36.46%	60	0.91%
2024	4,281	65.85%	2,199	33.83%	21	0.32%

United States Senate election results for Ben Hill County, Georgia2
Year	Republican		Democratic		Third party(ies)	
Year	No.	%	No.	%	No.	%
2020	4,077	62.95%	2,284	35.26%	116	1.79%
2020	3,531	61.81%	2,182	38.19%	0	0.00%

United States Senate election results for Ben Hill County, Georgia3
Year	Republican		Democratic		Third party(ies)	
Year	No.	%	No.	%	No.	%
2020	1,880	29.17%	1,308	20.30%	3,256	50.53%
2020	3,533	61.70%	2,193	38.30%	0	0.00%
2022	3,235	63.74%	1,767	34.82%	73	1.44%
2022	3,022	63.76%	1,718	36.24%	0	0.00%

Georgia Gubernatorial election results for Ben Hill County
Year	Republican		Democratic		Third party(ies)	
Year	No.	%	No.	%	No.	%
2022	3,412	66.67%	1,680	32.83%	26	0.51%

== Transportation ==
- Fitzgerald Municipal Airport is a public use airport located 2 miles southwest of Fitzgerald.

== See also ==
- National Register of Historic Places listings in Ben Hill County, Georgia
- List of counties in Georgia
