= National Register of Historic Places listings in Ben Hill County, Georgia =

This National Park Service list is complete through NPS recent listings posted November 13, 2025.

== Current listings ==
	Name on the Register	Image	Date listed	Location	City or town	Description
1	Ben Hill County Courthouse	Ben Hill County Courthouse	September 18, 1980 (#80000973)	E. Central Ave. 31°42′52″N 83°15′34″W	Fitzgerald	
2	Ben Hill County Jail	Ben Hill County Jail	August 26, 1982 (#82002383)	Pine St. 31°42′50″N 83°14′59″W	Fitzgerald	
3	Dorminy-Massee House	Dorminy-Massee House	May 26, 2000 (#00000529)	516 W. Central Ave. 31°42′51″N 83°15′35″W	Fitzgerald	website
4	Fitzgerald Commercial Historic District	Fitzgerald Commercial Historic District	April 28, 1992 (#92000383)	Roughly bounded by Ocmulgee, Thomas, Magnolia and Lee Sts. 31°42′51″N 83°15′09″W	Fitzgerald	
5	Holtzendorf Apartments	Holtzendorf Apartments	January 12, 1988 (#87001905)	105 W. Pine St. 31°42′50″N 83°15′18″W	Fitzgerald	
6	South Main-South Lee Streets Historic District	South Main-South Lee Streets Historic District	April 13, 1989 (#89000294)	Roughly bounded by Magnolia St., S. Main St., Roanoke Dr., and S. Lee St. 31°42′32″N 83°15′18″W	Fitzgerald	
7	Miles V. Wilsey House	Miles V. Wilsey House	February 23, 2001 (#01000166)	137 Hudson Rd. 31°44′00″N 83°13′54″W	Fitzgerald	
