= Queensland, Georgia =

Queensland
- Unincorporated community
- Location within the state of Georgia Queensland (the United States)
- Coordinates: 31°47′57″N 83°14′11″W
- Country: United States
- State: Georgia
- County: Ben Hill
- Elevation: 249 ft (76 m)
- Time zone: UTC-5 (Eastern (EST))
  - Summer (DST): UTC-4 (EDT)
- GNIS feature ID: 332774

Queensland is an unincorporated community in Ben Hill County, Georgia, United States. It lies along U.S. Route 129 north of the city of Fitzgerald, the county seat of Ben Hill County. Its elevation is 249 feet (76 m). The community is part of the Fitzgerald micropolitan statistical area.
