= Bowens Mill, Georgia =

Unincorporated community in Georgia, U.S.

Coordinates: 31°50′34″N 83°12′34″W

Bowens Mill is an unincorporated community in Ben Hill County, in the U.S. state of Georgia.

== History ==
The community was named after R. V. Bowen, the proprietor of a local gristmill. A post office called Bowens Mill was established in 1894, and remained in operation until 1906. A variant name was "Bowensville".
