= Fitzgerald Chicken Topiary =

Fitzgerald chicken topiary
- Location: Fitzgerald, Georgia, United States
- Material: Steel
- Height: 62 feet (19 m)
- Weight: 19.5 short tons (17.7 t)
- Beginning date: 2019

The Fitzgerald chicken topiary is an under-construction topiary in Fitzgerald, Georgia, United States. Construction began in 2019 and largely stalled in 2022, leaving a metal frame. Standing at approximately 62 feet (19 m) tall, it is the largest structure of a chicken in the world and, when complete, will be the world's tallest topiary.

== History ==
Fitzgerald, Georgia is a small city in the southern part of the state with a population of about 9,000. The town is noted for its population of wild Burmese chickens that live in and around the main part of the city. In 2019, city leaders announced the creation of a large topiary in the shape of a chicken as a way to attract tourism to the city. The project was spearheaded by Mayor Jim Puckett, who said the roadside attraction could target drivers on the nearby Interstate, which is a 20-minute drive from the city. The project was announced in 2019, and while it was initially planned to be completed by later that year, the project experienced delays due to the COVID-19 pandemic, as well as the designer of the topiary (Tennessee-based topiary artist Topiary Joe) having to take time off to recover from surgery. By May 2021, work was completed on the steel skeletal structure of the topiary, with a total of weight of about 19.5 short tons (17.7 t) and a height of about 62 feet (19 m) tall. (Note: Given as 64 feet (20 m) in one source.) In addition, the bottom of the structure would contain a room that tourists could rent out as a honeymoon suite or a bed and breakfast. With the completion of the skeleton, local television station WMAZ-TV called it "the world's largest chicken", while NPR stated that the finished project would be "the largest topiary in the world".

Construction of the topiary was paid for by a special-purpose local-option sales tax (SPLOST) that had been directed towards tourism. While the initial cost for the project was expected to be $150,000, the cost eventually rose to over twice this amount. While Mayor Puckett defended the spending as an investment in tourism that would deliver a strong return on investment (noting that the chicken project had been covered on the front page of The Wall Street Journal twice since it was announced), others in the city were opposed to the spending, and, according to NPR, the mayoral elections in November 2021 served as a "giant chicken referendum". Puckett lost reelection, with about 91 percent of voters voting against him, and following this, the city council put a freeze on new spending for the project until the newly elected mayor took office in January 2022.

Work on the topiary restarted in January 2024. Current construction on the sculpture aims to complete the metal framing and illuminate the chicken at night. Plans to envelop the metal frame with greenery are yet to be implemented.

== See also ==
- Big Chicken
