= Big Chicken =

KFC restaurant in Marietta, Georgia

The Big Chicken
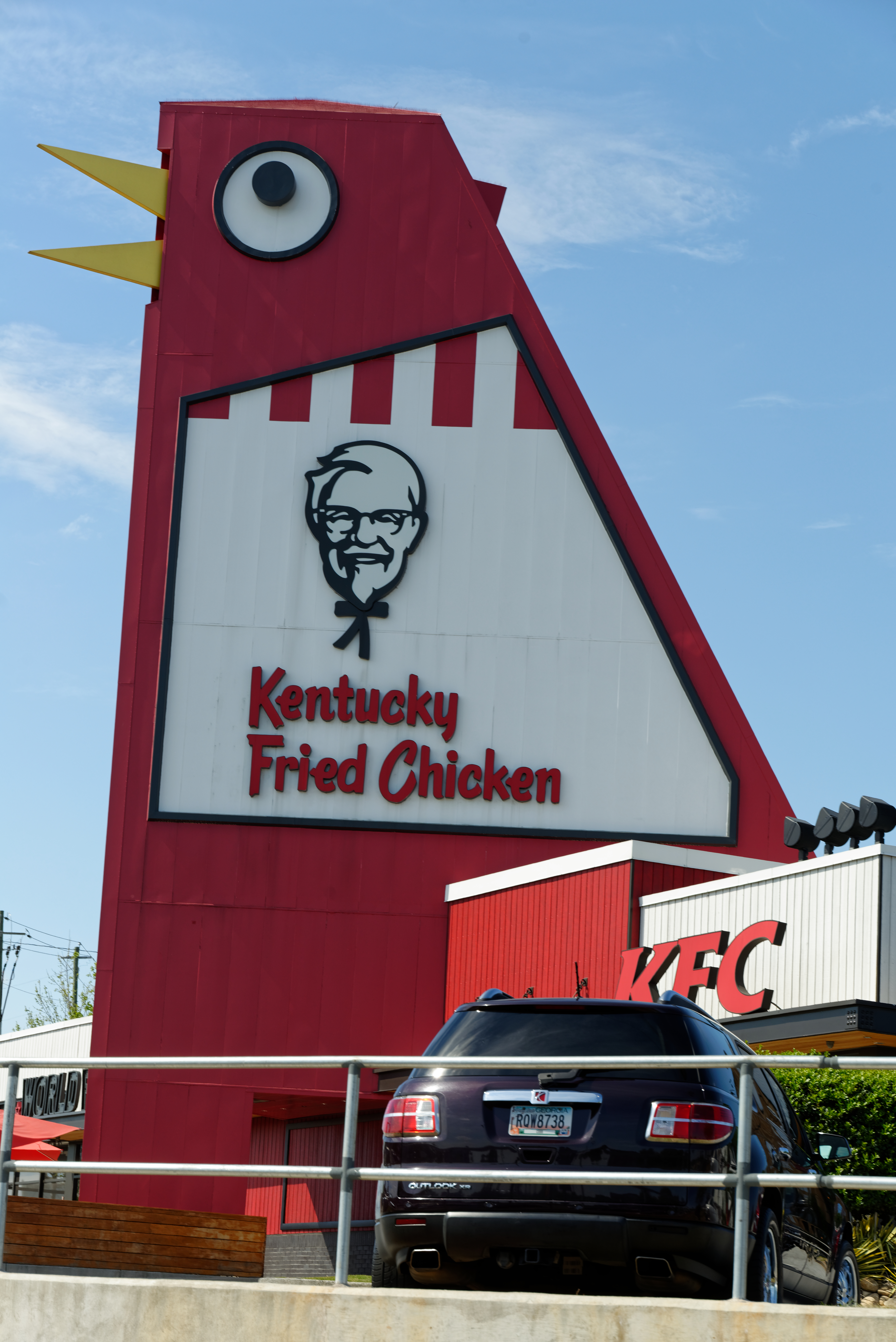
- The Big Chicken

- Location within Metro Atlanta Location within Georgia Location within the United States
- Interactive map showing the Big Chicken's location

General information
- Location: Marietta, Georgia, 12 Cobb Pkwy N, Marietta GA 30062, Marietta, Georgia, United States
- Coordinates: 33.9514°N 84.5204°W
- Construction started: 1956, 1993
- Completed: 1963 (The Big Chicken structure)
- Renovated: 2017
- Client: Tubby Davis

Design and construction
- Architect: Hubert Puckett

The Big Chicken is a KFC restaurant in Marietta, Georgia, which features a 56-foot-tall (17 m) steel-sided structure designed in the appearance of a chicken rising up from the top of the building. It is located at the intersection of Cobb Parkway (U.S. 41/Georgia 3) and Roswell Road (Georgia 120) and is a well-known landmark in the area. Constructed in 1963, it was rebuilt following storm damage in 1993 and underwent a $2 million renovation project in 2017.

== History ==
The Big Chicken in action.

The restaurant was built in 1963 at 12 Cobb Parkway, on the newly constructed stretch of Highway 41, the first divided highway in Cobb County. Taking advantage of the prime location on the new and quicker route for travelers on U.S. 41, Johnny Reb's Chick, Chuck and Shake owner S. R. "Tubby" Davis erected the 56-foot (17-meter) tall structure over his restaurant in 1963 as a method of advertising. The novelty architecture was designed by Hubert Puckett, a Georgia Tech student of architecture, and fabricated by Atlantic Steel in nearby Atlanta (of which Marietta is a suburb). Davis later sold it to his brother, and it subsequently became a franchise of KFC.

In January 1993, storm winds damaged the structure, and rather than tear it down KFC was forced by public outcry to re-erect the building. Among those who complained about the Big Chicken being torn down were pilots, who used the building as a reference point when approaching Hartsfield–Jackson Atlanta International Airport and Dobbins Air Reserve Base. The new Big Chicken includes the original design of beak and eyes which move, although this time the vibrations which plagued the first structure (even to the point of breaking windows) have been eliminated. Pieces of the original structure were sold to collectors as souvenirs. In early April 2006, the structure narrowly escaped a small eastward-moving nighttime tornado, which overturned a tractor-trailer at a Kmart across the street, and damaged another building nearby.

In early 2017 it was announced that The Big Chicken would undergo a twelve-week, $2 million renovation, incorporating the chain's newest design and a gift shop. The renovations began January 23, 2017. The restaurant reopened with a ribbon-cutting ceremony on May 11, 2017.

== Culture ==
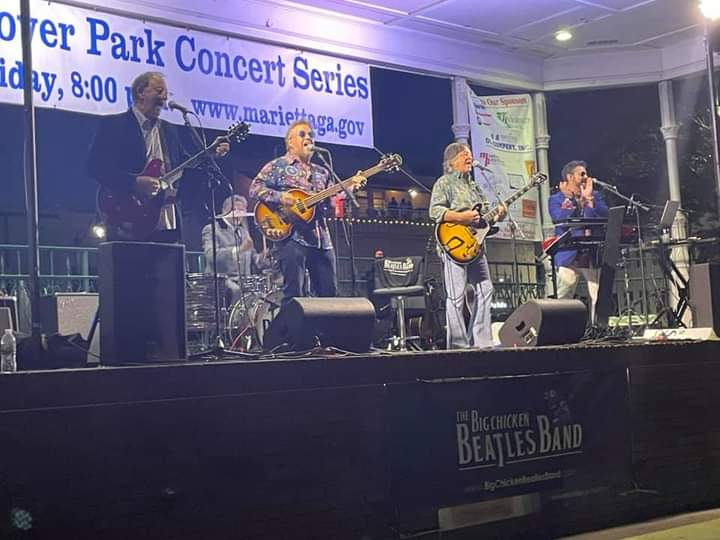
The Big Chicken Beatles Band Glover Park Concert 2021

The Big Chicken has become one of the most well-recognized landmarks in Marietta, and has an established history of impacting the local culture of the area. Inside the building exists a gift shop selling souvenirs emblazoned with the monument and holding it comparable to other landmarks worldwide such as Big Ben and the Eiffel Tower. A board game featuring the Big Chicken and other local landmarks was produced in 1985 as part of a promotion for the city of Marietta. There is a barbershop-style singing group called the Big Chicken Chorus, formed in 1986, which gives concerts throughout the year. There is also a Marietta-based band called The Big Chicken Beatles Band which performs often at town activities. The Big Chicken was also featured on a promotional card in Sim City: The Card Game, and has appeared in the comic strip Zippy the Pinhead as a part of artist Bill Griffith's fascination with roadside icons.

The Big Chicken is also commonly used as a landmark for driving directions. Locals will often include "make a [turn] at the Big Chicken", or "it's about x miles past the Big Chicken". This is referenced in music video game Rock Band 3's "Road Challenge Mode", when the player is told "Don't be alarmed if you're asking for directions in the bus and the locals tell you to 'turn left at the Big Chicken'".

== See also ==
- Novelty architecture
- Big Duck
- Fitzgerald Chicken Topiary
- Big Chicken (restaurant chain)
- List of fast-food chicken restaurants
