= Blue and Gray Museum =

The Blue and Gray Museum is the name of at least two American Civil War museums:

- Blue and Gray Museum (Georgia), in Fitzgerald, Georgia
- Blue and Gray Museum (Alabama), in Decatur, Alabama

== See also ==
- The Blue and the Gray (disambiguation)
