= Wiregrass Georgia Technical College =

Technical college in Valdosta, Georgia, United States

- Former names: Formed from merger of East Central Technical College and Valdosta Technical College
- Type: Public community college
- Established: July 1, 2010; 15 years ago
- President: DeAnnia Clements
- Students: 4,466 (fall 2024)
- Location: Valdosta, Georgia, United States; 30.886444°N 83.353820°W
- Campus: Multiple campuses
- Colors: Green and Black
- Website: www.wiregrass.edu
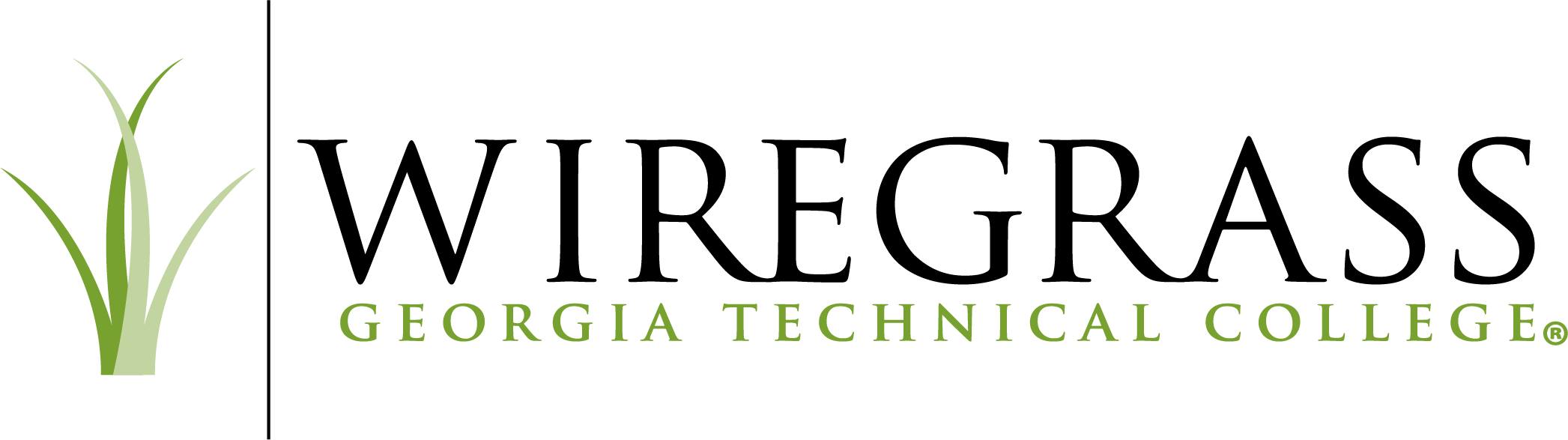

Wiregrass Georgia Technical College (WGTC) is a public community college in Valdosta, Georgia. It is part of the Technical College System of Georgia and provides education for an eleven-county service area in south-central Georgia. The school's service area includes Atkinston, Ben Hill, Berrien, Brooks, Coffee, Cook, Echols, Irwin, Lanier, Lowndes, and Wilcox counties. WGTC is accredited by the Southern Association of Colleges and Schools to award associate degrees, diplomas, and technical certificates of credit.

WGTC was formed on July 1, 2010, from a merger of East Central Technical College and Valdosta Technical College. This merger had previously been approved by the State Board of Technical and Adult Education on September 4, 2008, as part of a major series of mergers and geographical restructuring in the TCSG system.

WGTC's full campuses are located in Valdosta, Fitzgerald, Douglas, and Sparks. Some classes are also taught at extended campuses located at Moody Air Force Base in Lowndes County and in Rochelle. In addition, there are "Adult Education Centers" in all 11 counties of the school's service area, offering Basic Education, GED and ESL classes.

On December 2, 2010, WGTC was named the first recipient of the Governor Sonny Perdue Award for Technical College of the Year.

== Gallery ==
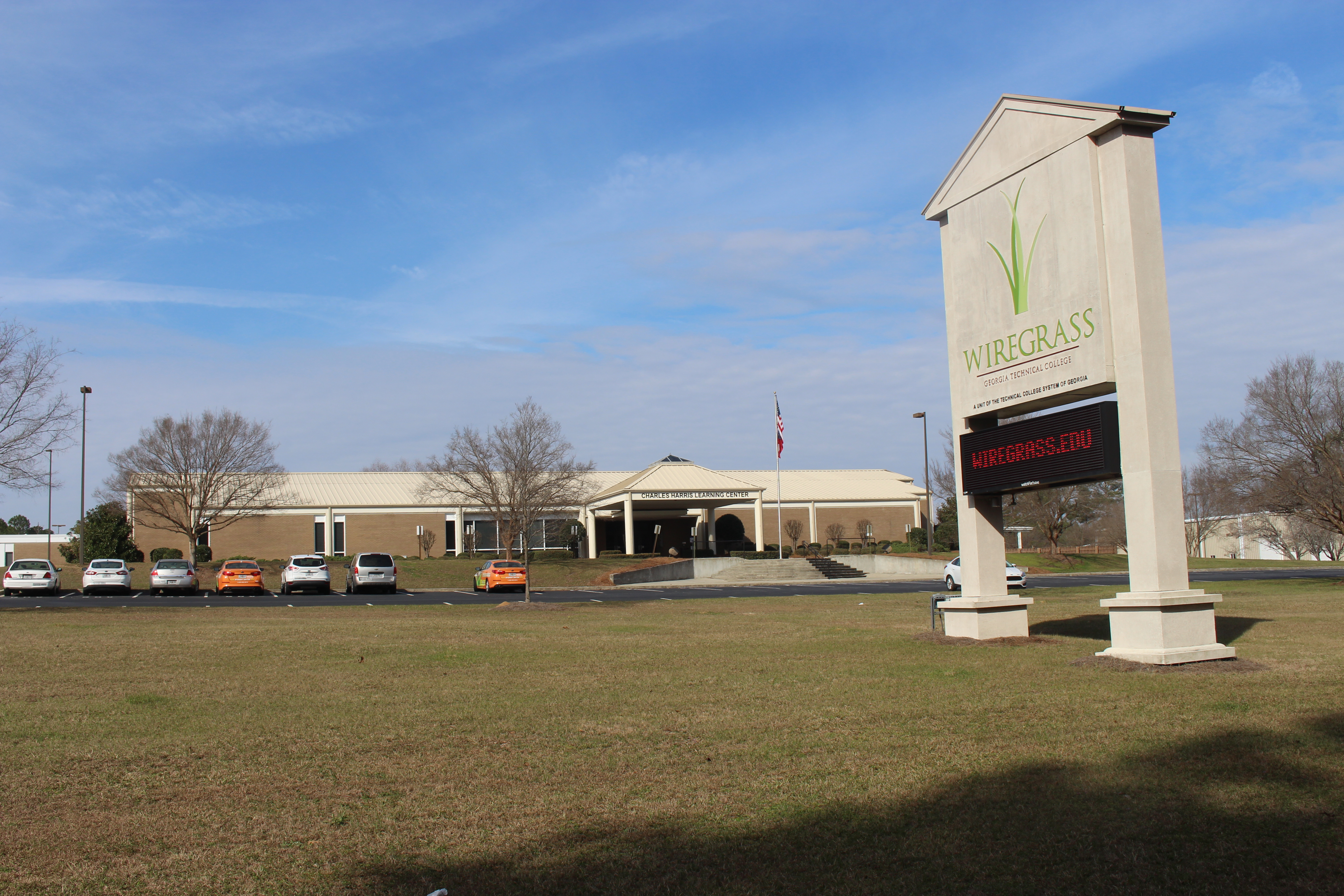
Ben Hill Irwin Campus

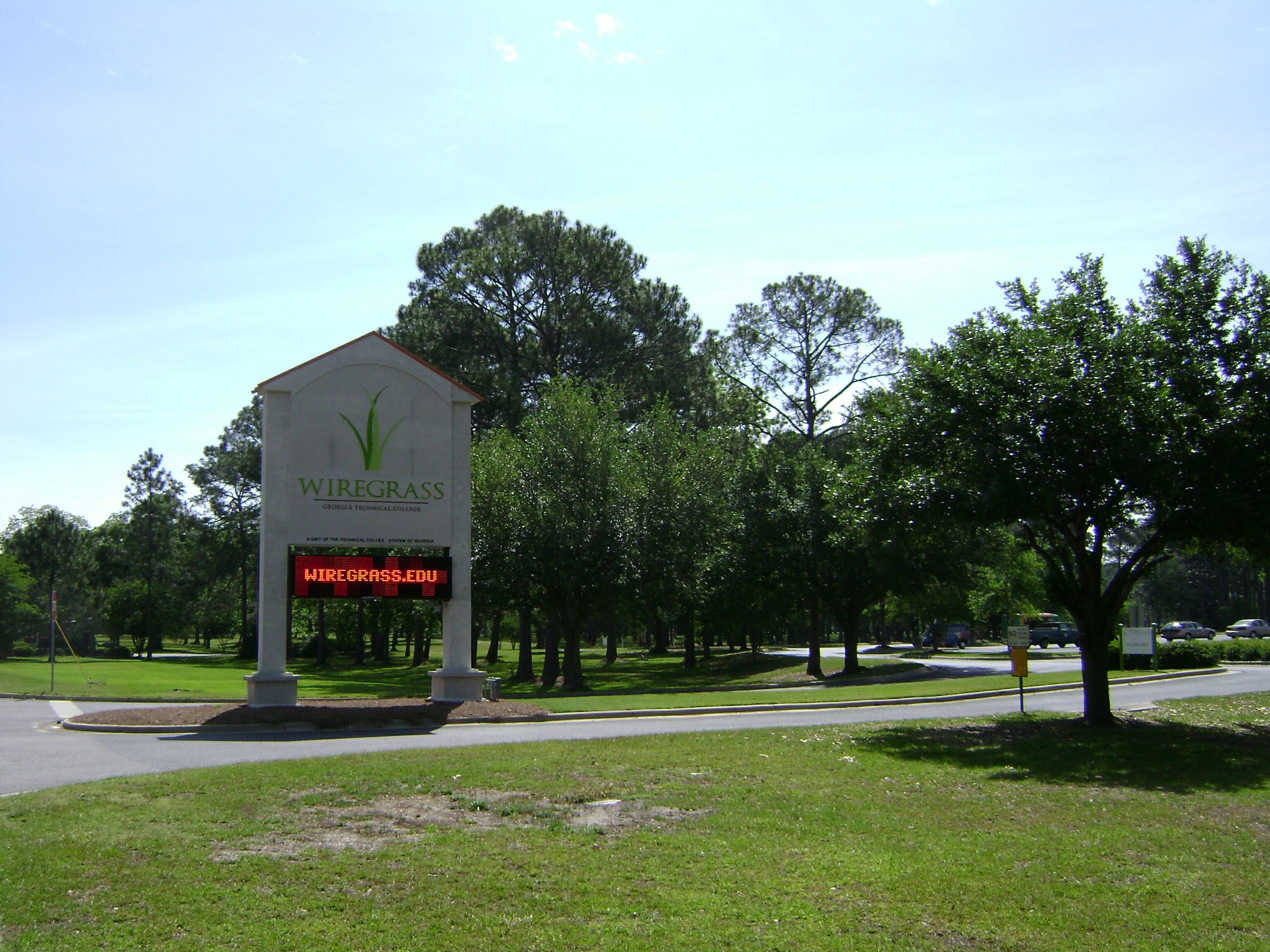
Coffee County, Douglas Campus

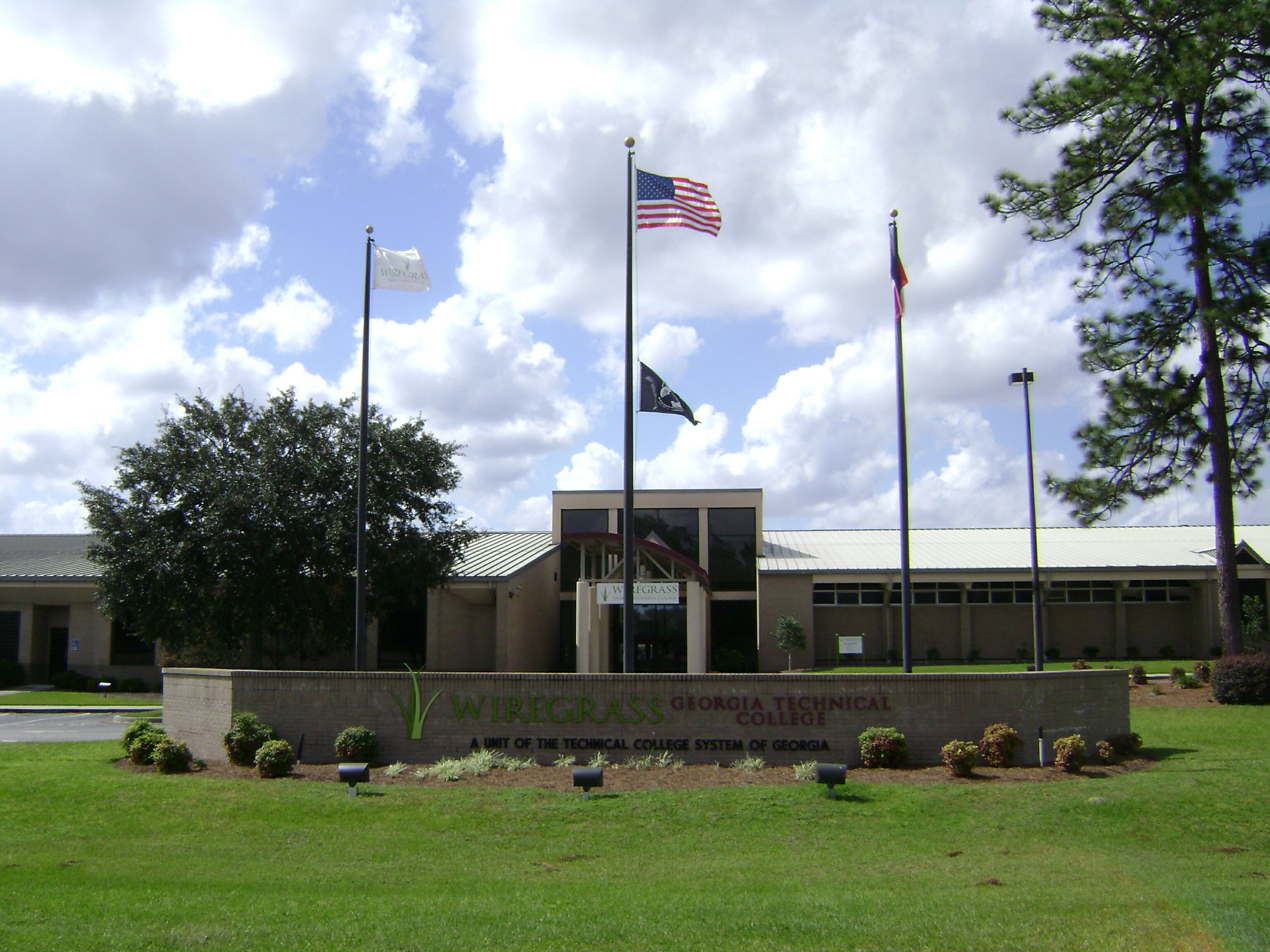
Lowndes County Campus
