= Ben Hill County Jail =

Jail in Fitzgerald, Georgia

- U.S. National Register of Historic Places
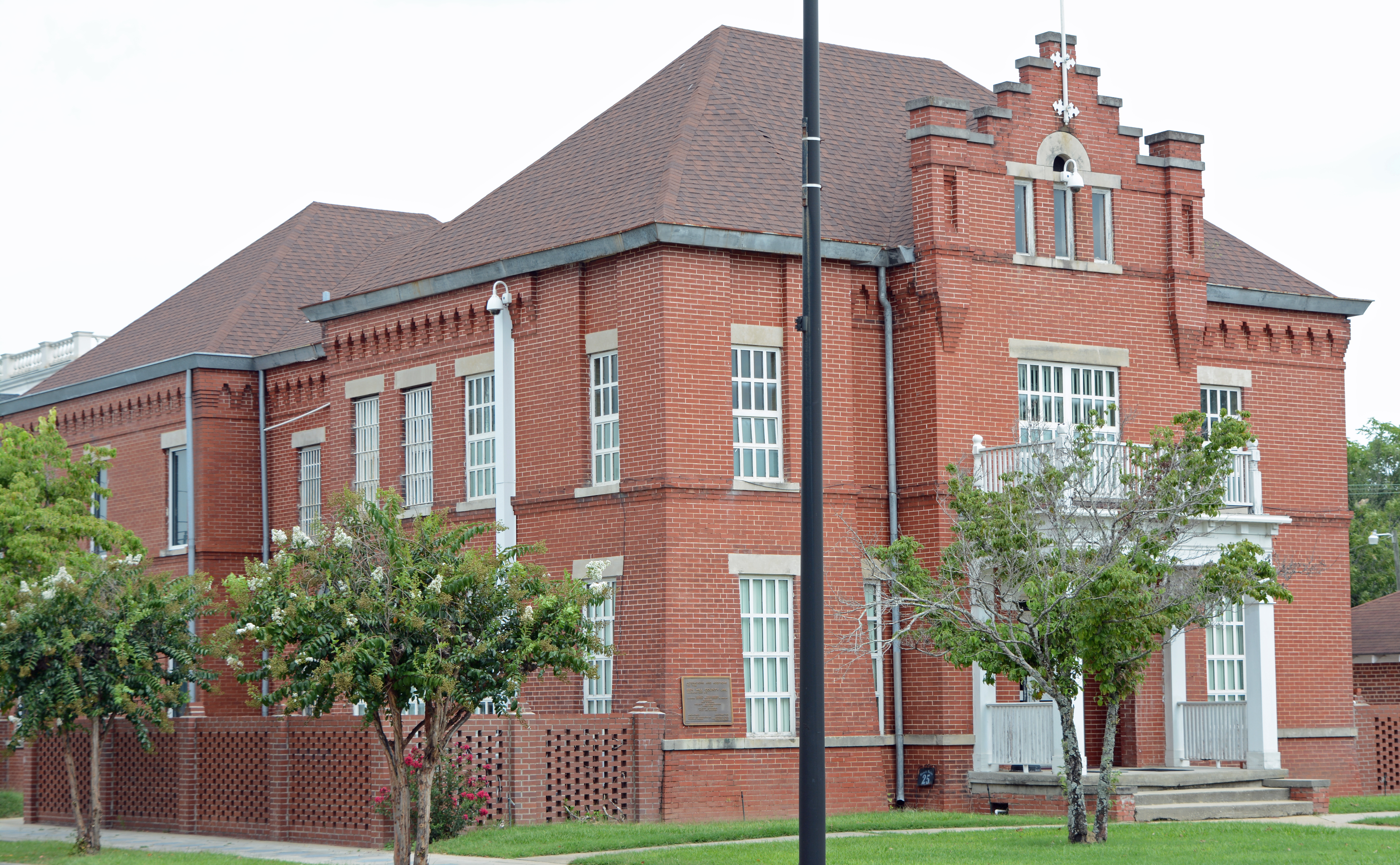
- Ben Hill County Jail (2015)

- Location within Georgia
- Interactive map showing the location of Ben Hill County Jail
- Location: Pine St., Fitzgerald, Georgia
- Coordinates: 31.71388°N 83.24986°W
- Area: less than one acre
- Built: 1909
- Built by: Manly & Lamon Construction Co.
- Architect: MacEachron, J. Reginald
- Architectural style: Romanesque
- MPS: County Jails of Ben Hill, Berrien, Brooks, and Turner Counties TR;Georgia County Courthouses TR
- NRHP reference No.: 82002383
- Added to NRHP: August 26, 1982

The Ben Hill County Jail is a historic building in Fitzgerald, Georgia, located on Pine Street. It was built in 1909 in the Romanesque style, the first jail in the 1906-created county. It was designed by J. Reginald MacEachron, selected by a design competition in which 14 architects submitted proposals for the county's courthouse and jail. It is two stories high on a raised basement. It originally had an elaborately corbeled battlemented tower, but it was shortened between 1920 and 1935. The south entrance leads to the sheriff's living quarters which was used by the sheriff and his family until the 1950s. It was used until not too long before 1982.

It was listed on the National Register of Historic Places in 1982.

== See also ==
- National Register of Historic Places listings in Ben Hill County, Georgia
