= Holtzendorf Apartments =

- U.S. National Register of Historic Places
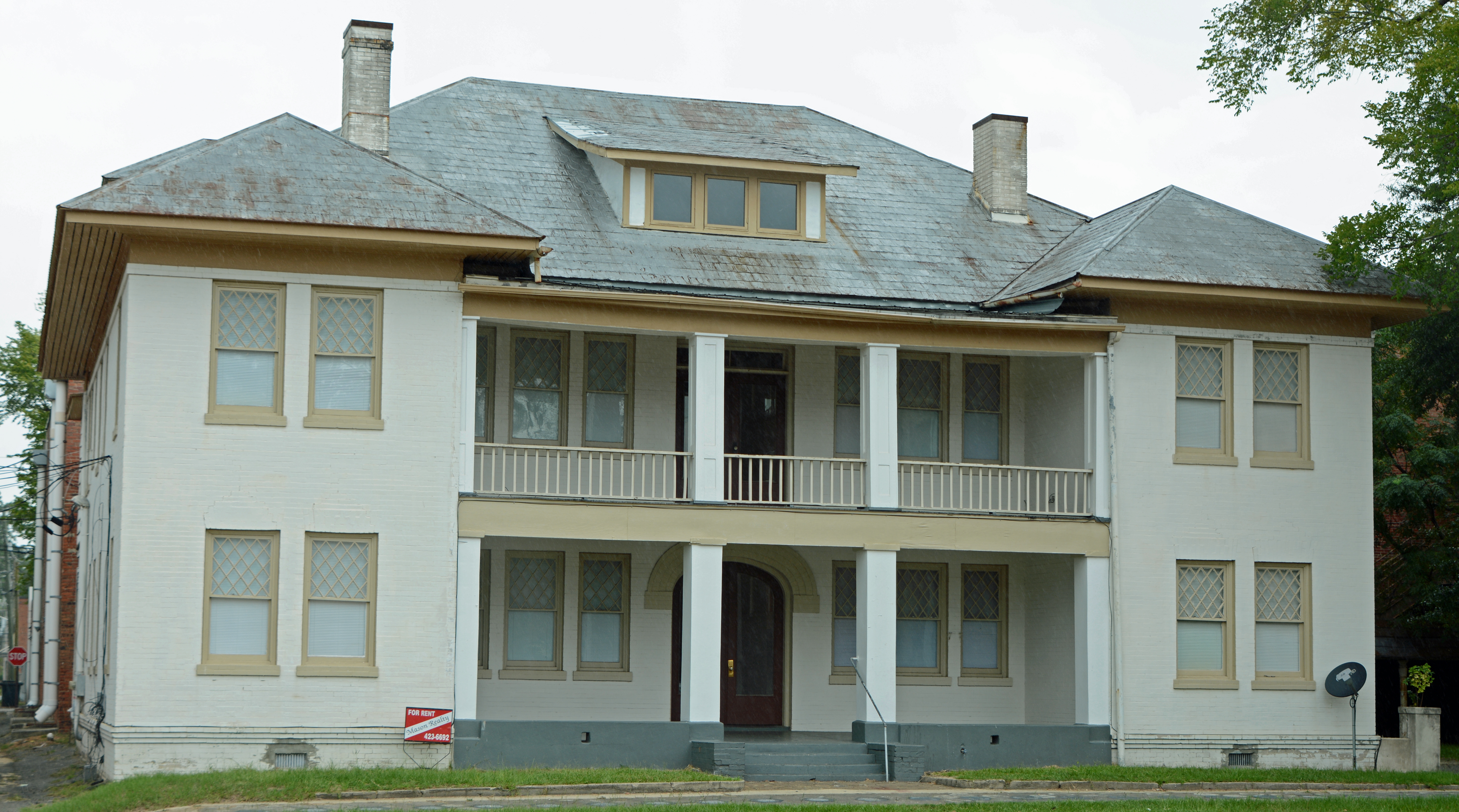

- Location within Georgia
- Location: 105 W. Pine St., Fitzgerald, Georgia
- Coordinates: 31.71380°N 83.25505°W
- Area: 0.3 acres (0.12 ha)
- Built: 1909
- Architectural style: Craftsman
- NRHP reference No.: 87001905
- Added to NRHP: January 12, 1988

The Holtzendorf Apartments, at 105 W. Pine St. in Fitzgerald, Georgia, was built in 1908. It was listed on the National Register of Historic Places in 1988.

It is a two-and-a-half-story brick apartment building. It has a two-story double porch in the middle of its main facade, with square columns; the upper porch has a wooden balustrade. It has Craftsman details including "a multiple-gabled low-pitched roof, with projecting dormer windows and broad eaves, and a diamond-pattern window glazing."

A one-story masonry carport to the east of apartment building, is a second contributing building. It is not enclosed; the roof is supported by decorative cast-iron columns.
