= Ben Hill County Courthouse =

- U.S. National Register of Historic Places
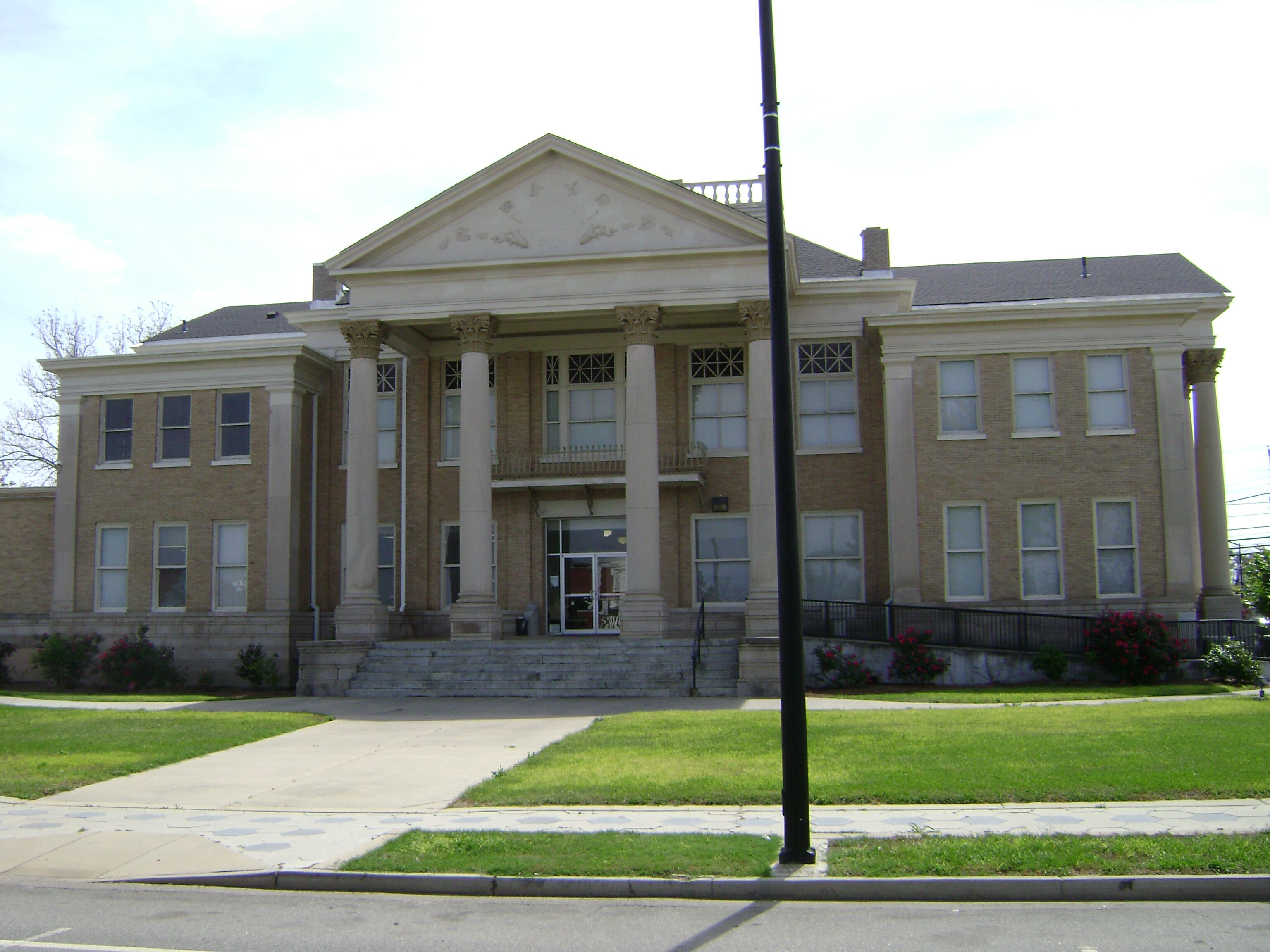

- Location within Georgia Location within the United States
- Interactive map showing the location of Ben Hill County Courthouse
- Location: E. Central Ave., Fitzgerald, Georgia
- Coordinates: 31.71444°N 83.25943°W
- Area: less than one acre
- Built: 1909
- Built by: Falls Church Construction Co.
- Architect: Henry H. Huggins
- Architectural style: Classical Revival
- MPS: Georgia County Courthouses TR
- NRHP reference No.: 80000973
- Added to NRHP: September 18, 1980

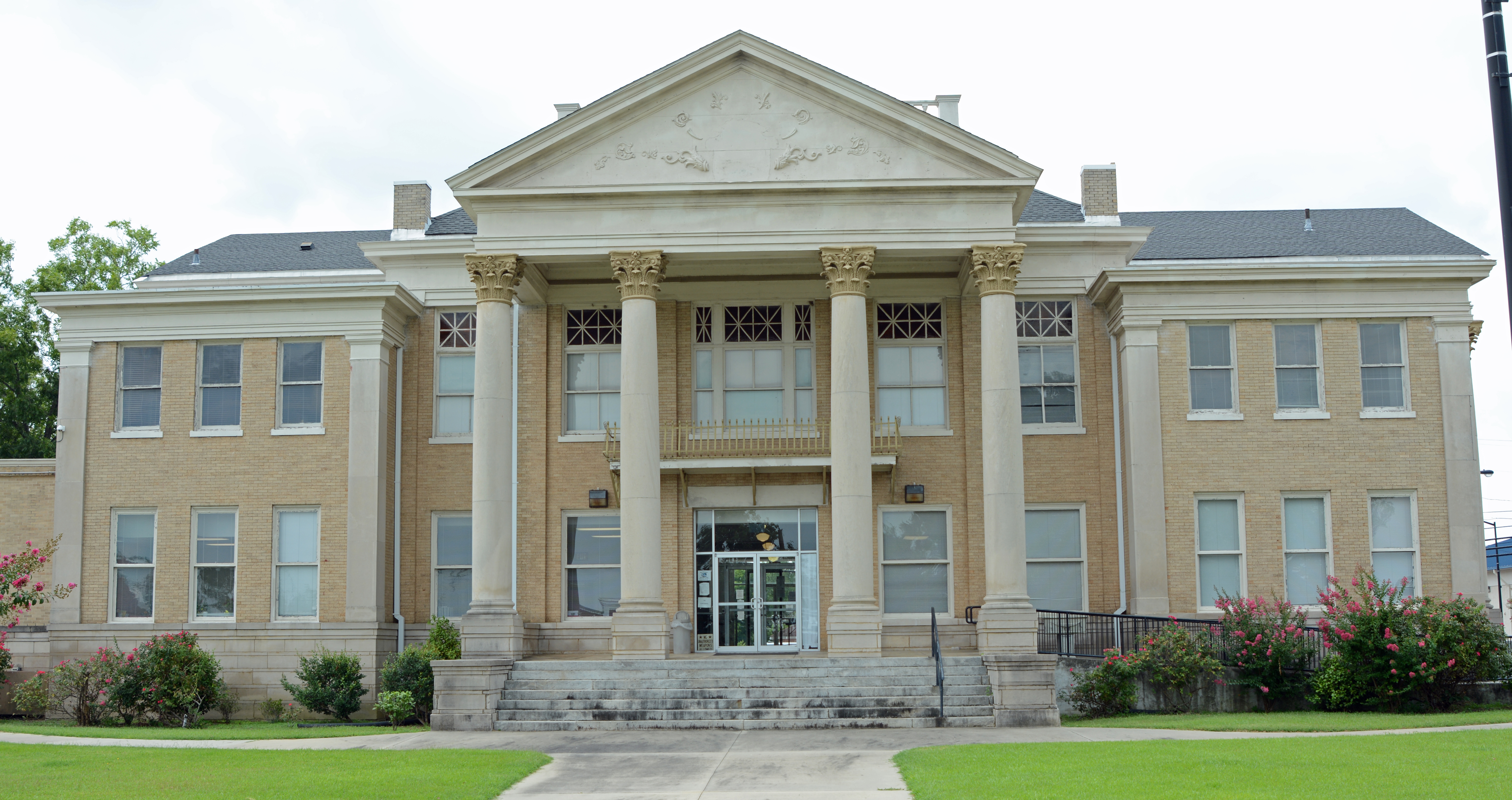
Courthouse in 2015

Ben Hill County Courthouse is the historic county courthouse of Ben Hill County, Georgia, located in Fitzgerald. It was added to the National Register of Historic Places on September 18, 1980. It is located at East Central Avenue at South Sheridan Street.

== History ==
Ben Hill County was created from parts of Irwin and Wilcox counties in 1907, and Fitzgerald was selected as the county seat.

A bond was approved for the county courthouse by 1908, and Virginia architect Henry H. Huggins was selected as architect by the county commissioners from a group of fourteen proposals. It was completed in 1909 at a cost of $50,000. The building initially had a clock tower atop it, but it fell through to the ground-floor lobby sometime in the mid-20th century and was never replaced.

A granite war memorial on the courthouse lawn reads: "In grateful appreciation of the boys of Ben Hill County who gave their service during the World War. Erected by Nathaniel Abney Chapter, Daughters of American Revolution, Dec. 28, 1928."

== See also ==
- National Register of Historic Places listings in Ben Hill County, Georgia
