= Blue and Gray Museum (Georgia) =

Coordinates: 31.7158°N 83.2578°W

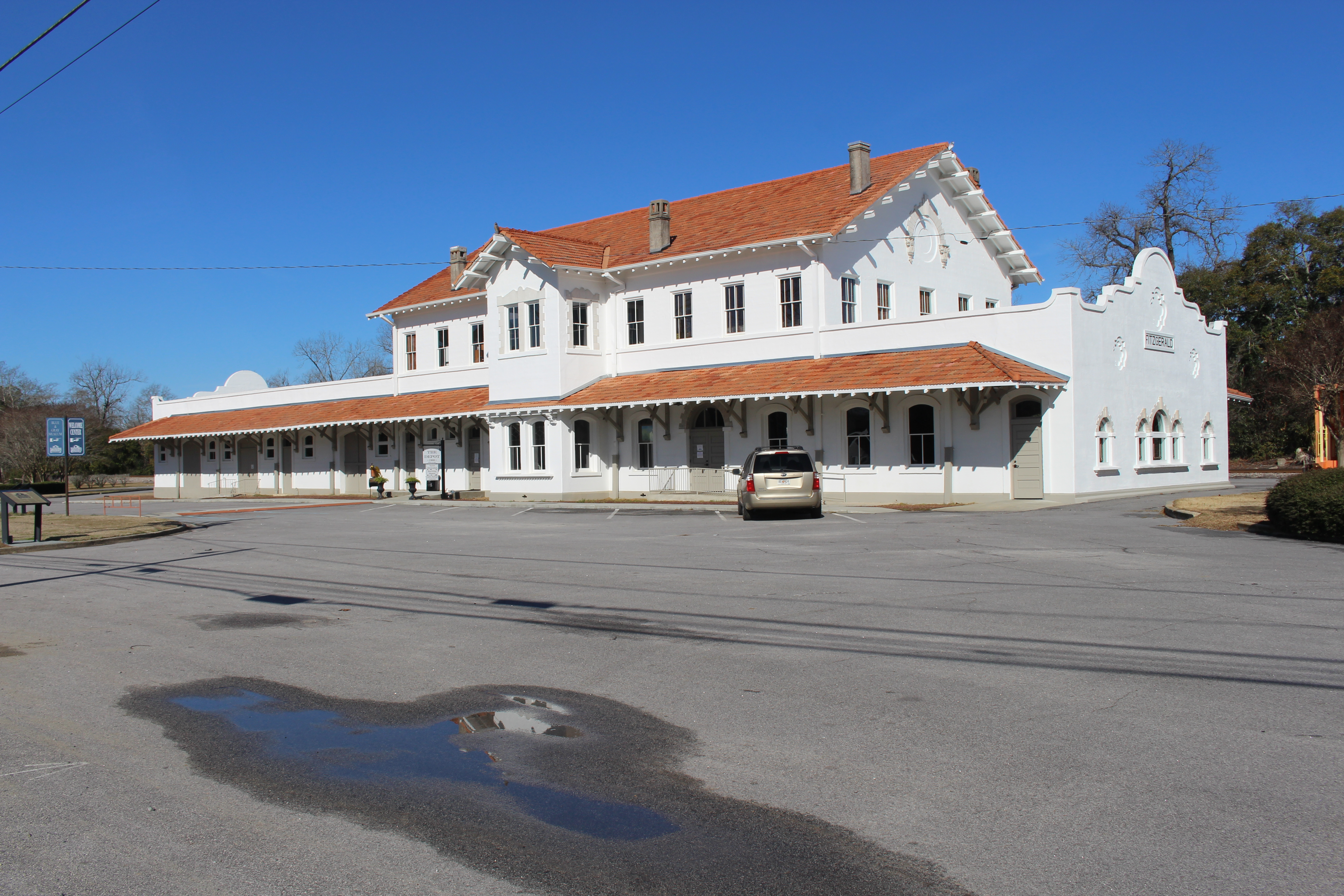
The Blue and Gray Museum operating from the former Atlanta, Birmingham and Atlantic Railway station

The Blue and Gray Museum in Fitzgerald, Georgia is located in a historic railroad depot that has been renovated to showcase the story of Fitzgerald's history and connections with the American Civil War. At the museum's core is its Hall of Honor, dedicated to the Civil War veterans who established the city. The museum also honors the town's local heroes, including General Raymond Gilbert Davis, the nation's most highly decorated Marine.

== See also ==
- Blue and Gray Museum (disambiguation)

Preceding station	Atlantic Coast Line Railroad	Following station
Abba toward Atlanta	AB&C Atlanta – Waycross	Osierfield toward Waycross
