= Ulysses Davis (artist) =

American sculptor

- Born: Ulysses Davis; January 13, 1913; Fitzgerald, Georgia, U.S.
- Died: 1990 (aged 76–77); Savannah, Georgia, U.S.
- Known for: Wooden sculpture
- Movement: American Folk

Ulysses Davis (January 13, 1913 – 1990) was an African-American barber and self-taught sculptor. Davis is best known for his carvings of historical figures such as a set of mahogany busts of all the presidents (through George H. W. Bush) and similar portrait heads of the Rev. Dr. Martin Luther King Jr., the Kennedys and other leaders from the civil rights era.

== Early life ==
Ulysses Davis was born in the railroad town of Fitzgerald, Georgia, to Mary and Malachi Davis. His father was a railway fireman, while his mother was a homemaker. The fourth of five children, Davis left school after the fourth grade to work as a railroad blacksmith’s assistant to help support his family. This aspiring wood carver started whittling the family’s firewood with a pocket knife as a child.

In 1942, Davis moved his family to Savannah, where he would live for 48 years, raising six sons and three daughters with his wife, Elizabeth. When he was laid off by the railroad in the 1950s, he opened the Ulysses Barber Shop in an outbuilding near his home at Bull and 45th Street. He lined the shelves of his barbershop with his wood carvings, creating a makeshift art gallery, and enjoyed discussing art with his customers. He typically created his sculptures, busts, canes and portraits freehand, without drawings, using a hatchet or band saw to start a piece and then finishing it with a chisel or knife. He designed many of his own tools, applying the metalworking skills he learned as a young man working as a railroad blacksmith. He even used barber scissors, on occasion, to get just the right texture on his sculptures, which he sometimes adorned with shoe polish, rhinestones and beads. When reflecting on his own work, the artist said: "These things are very dear to me. They’re a part of me. They’re my treasure. If I sold these, I’d be really poor."

== Artistic methods and materials used ==
Davis worked with many kinds of wood, including mahogany, cedar and poplar, sometimes obtained from friends who worked as longshoremen on the Savannah docks. He typically worked without the aid of preliminary drawings, using hatchets and band saws to rough out the form before picking up a chisel or knife. He fashioned some of his tools himself, using metalworking skills he learned during a stint as a railroad blacksmith.

Some of his carvings are painted, stained or rubbed with black shoe polish and adorned with rhinestones and pearl beads. He also used metal punches and stamps, of his own design, to create lizard-like surface textures, as in the pair of serpentine sculptures "Beast With Wings" and "Created Beast With Many Heads."

Davis created over three hundred pieces of art in his lifetime including carved wooden figured, furniture pieces, and reliefs. He used unique sculpting and building materials such as shipyard lumber, pieces donated by his friends, or wood he bought at lumberyards. Davis almost never made preliminary drawings or models but reduced the mass with a hatchet or a bandsaw before refining the form with a chisel and knives. To add textural detail, he sometimes used tools of this barbering trade, such as the blade of his hair clippers.

== Inspiration and themes ==
Although Davis has been best known for his carvings of historical figures, he carved portraits of historical and biblical figures, realistic animals, and fanciful portraits of African tribal leaders as well as dragon-like beasts.

As far as Davis's approach to African American art goes, he synthesized motifs from different parts of the continent. His "Makonde", a version of the "Tree of Life" found in sculpture from Tanzania and Mozambique, includes a Janus-like divinity out of Yoruba cosmology. He also relied on popular representations of Africans, basing one series of sculptures on illustrations of warrior kings from a 1970s Anheuser-Busch promotional calendar. Not only looking to Africa, he created works that featured a potbellied Buddha and as well as an armless figure with features resembling those on Himalayan masks called "Red Lips."

His most intricate works are the decorative objects he referred to as "twinklets": tiered boxes that look like wedding cakes, adorned with beads and crystals. He also made canes, tables and other functional pieces. “The Garden of Eden,” his last and largest work, depicts Adam and Eve nestled between the legs of a table. A grinning serpent rises from the tabletop.
