= Atlanta station =

Atlanta station may refer to:

== Rail stations in Atlanta ==
- Peachtree station, the current Amtrak station serving Atlanta
- Terminal Station (Atlanta), demolished in 1972
- Atlanta Union Station
  - Atlanta Union Station (1853), burned in the Battle of Atlanta
  - Atlanta Union Station (1871)
  - Atlanta Union Station (1930), demolished in 1972

== Other uses ==
- Atlanta Station, Wisconsin
