= Blue and Gray Museum (Alabama) =

Coordinates: 34.6129°N 86.9851°W

The Blue and Gray Museum was a large, privately owned collection of American Civil War artifacts in Decatur, Alabama, in the United States. The museum was also home to a number of non-Civil War artifacts including U.S. General Joseph K. Mansfield's ivory-handled Colt 1851 Navy revolver, shako military hats that dated to the Mexican–American War, Lt. Charles E. Warren's 1810–1840-era sword, and letters from Ulysses S. Grant, John C. Calhoun, Ormsby Mitchel, and P.G.T. Beauregard.

== See also ==
- Blue and Gray Museum (disambiguation)
