= Fitzgerald, Georgia =

- City
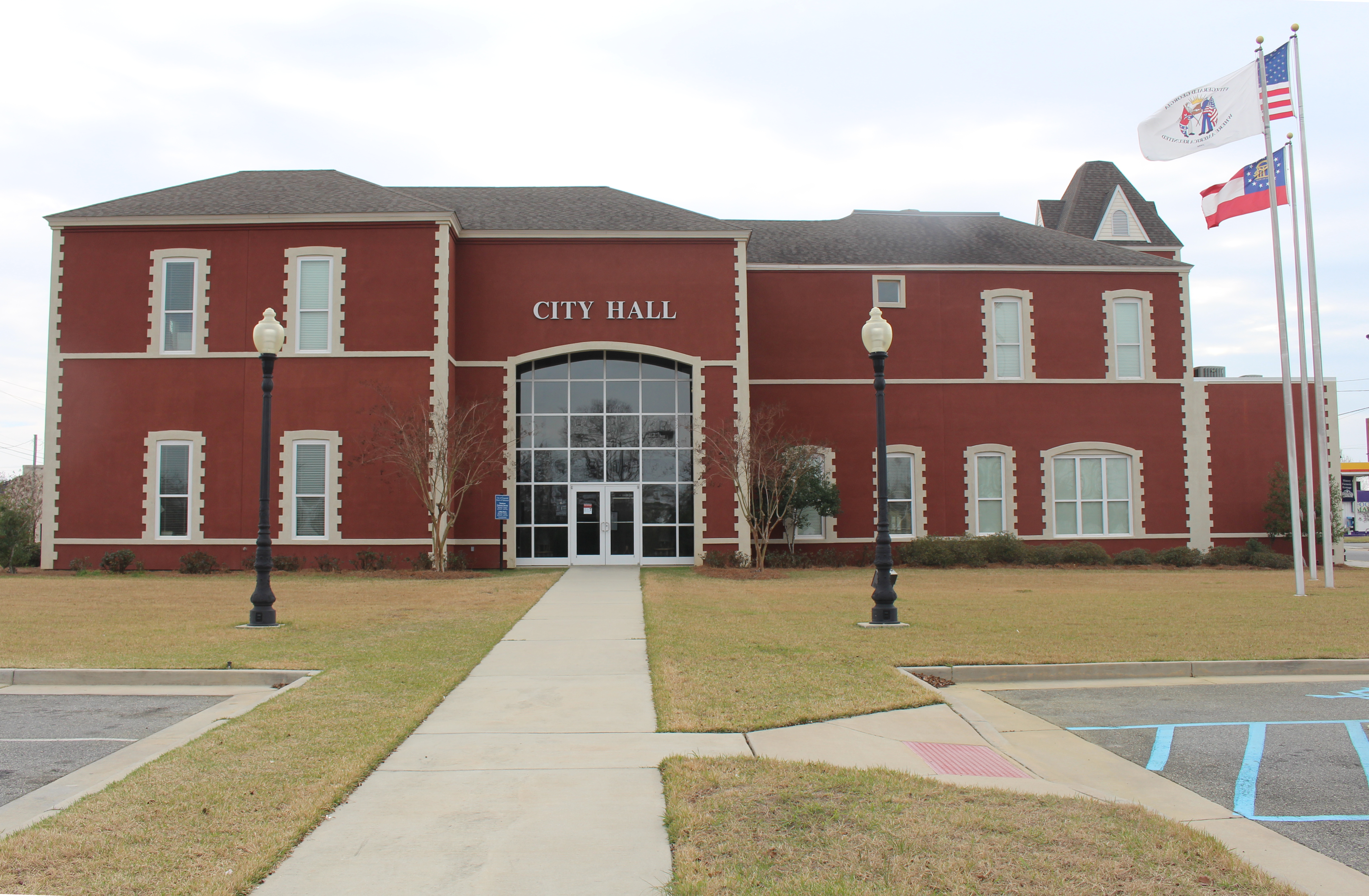
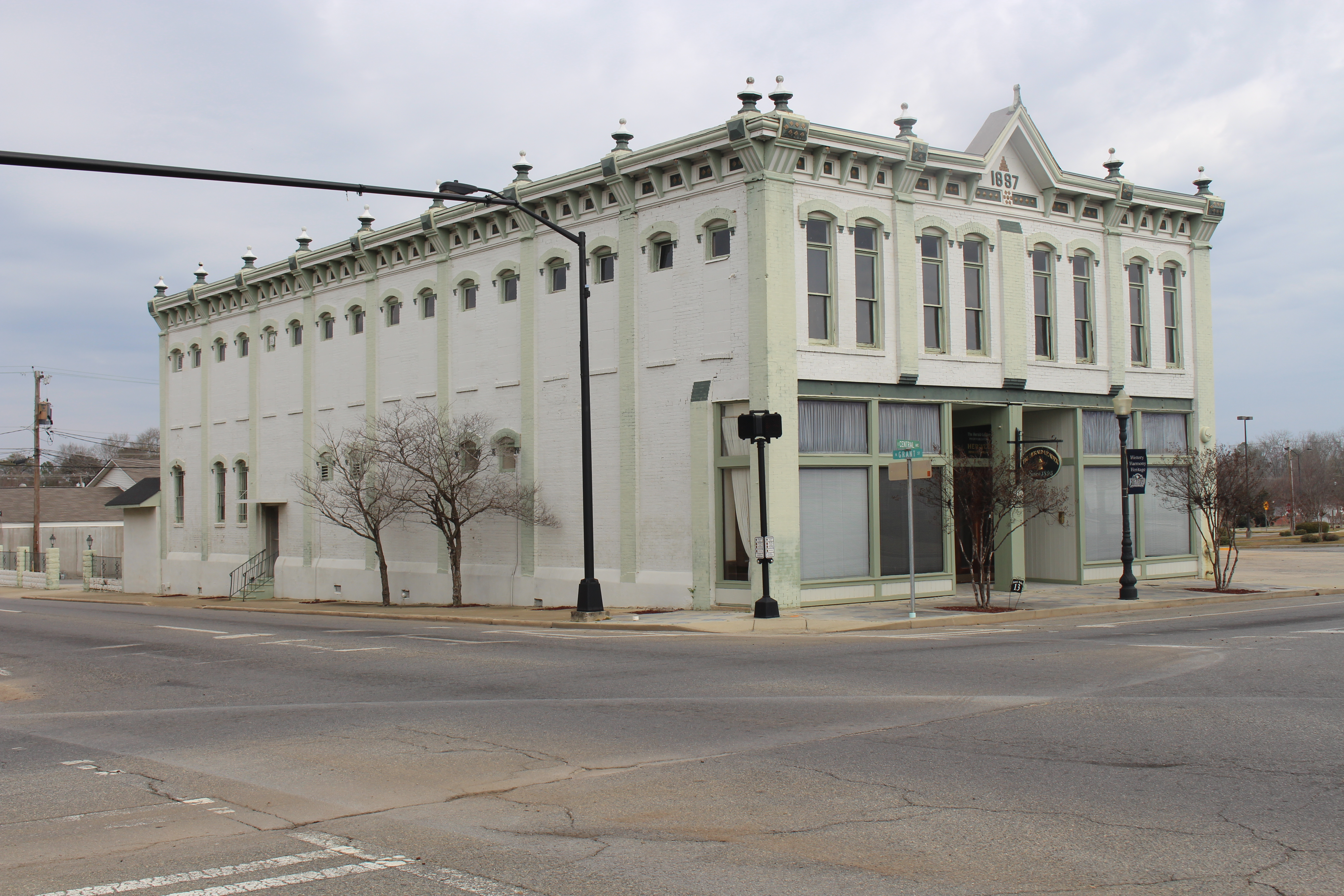
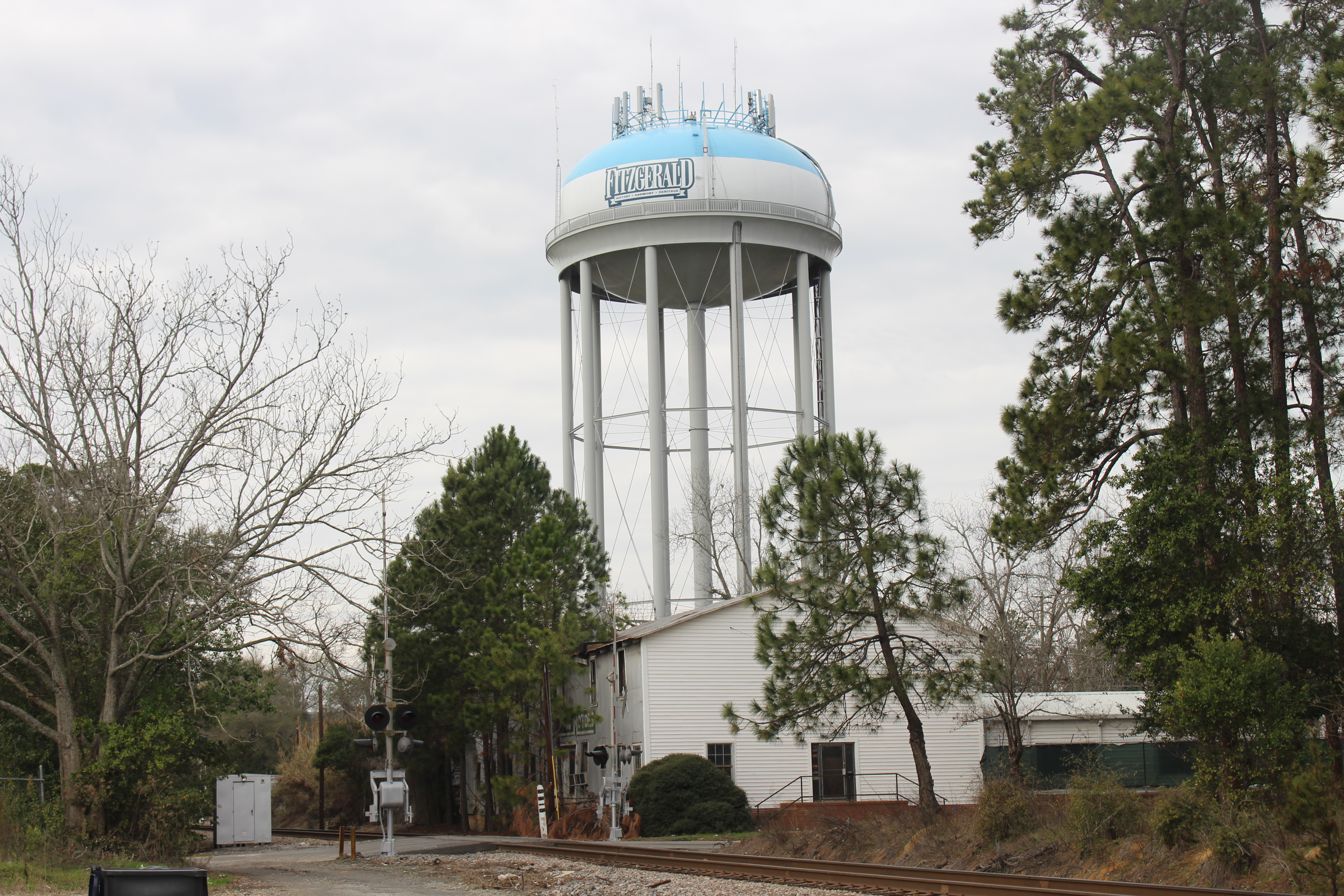
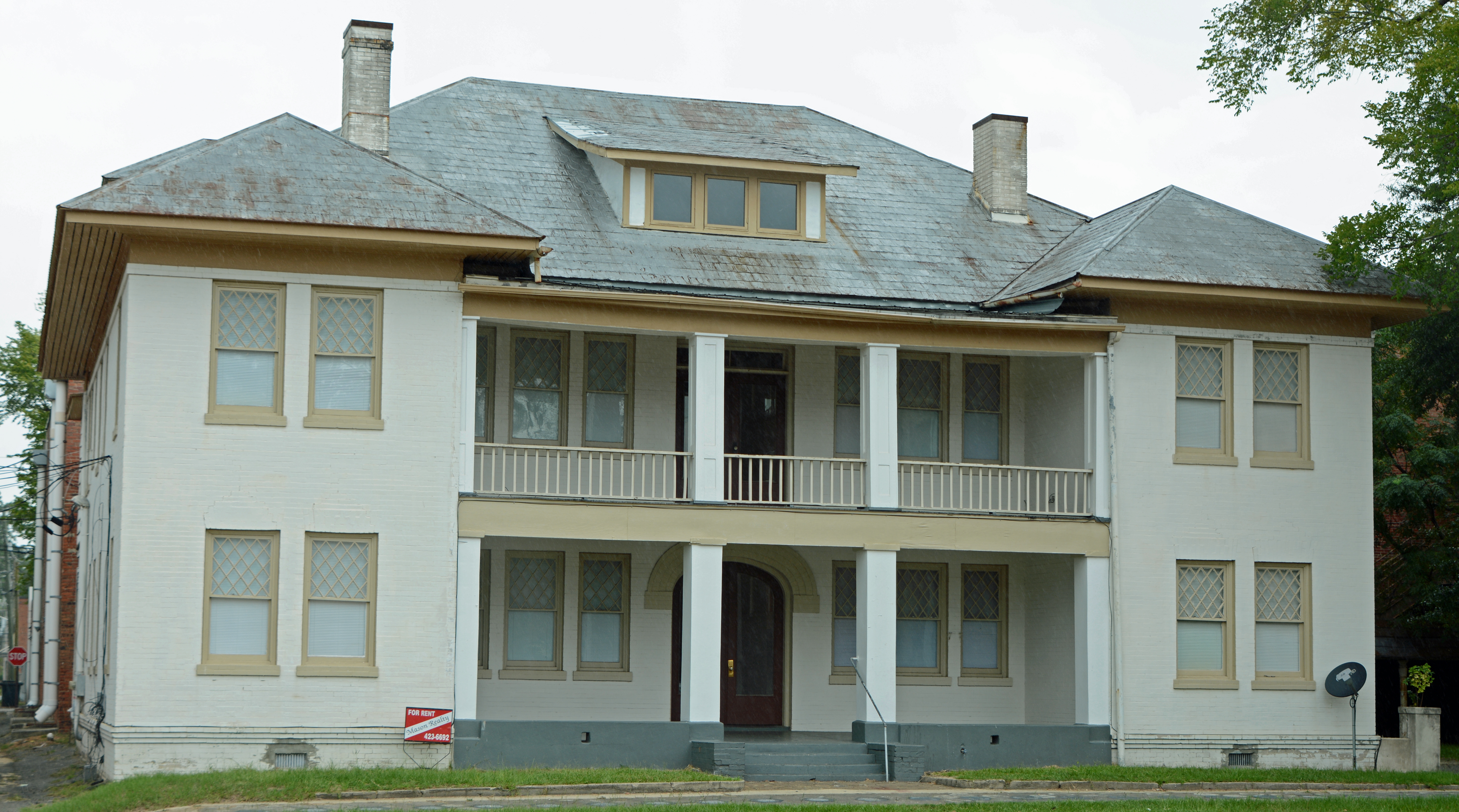
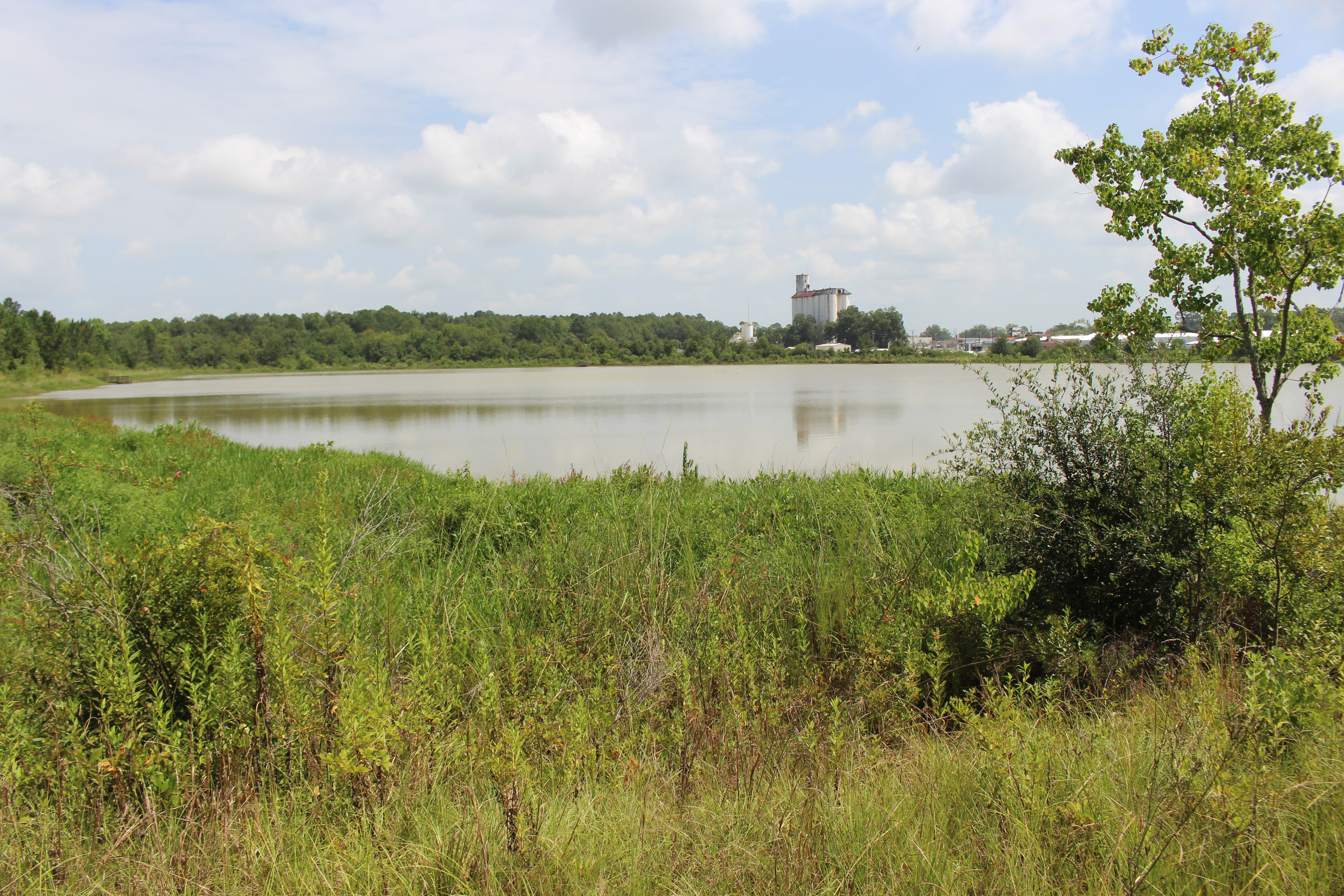
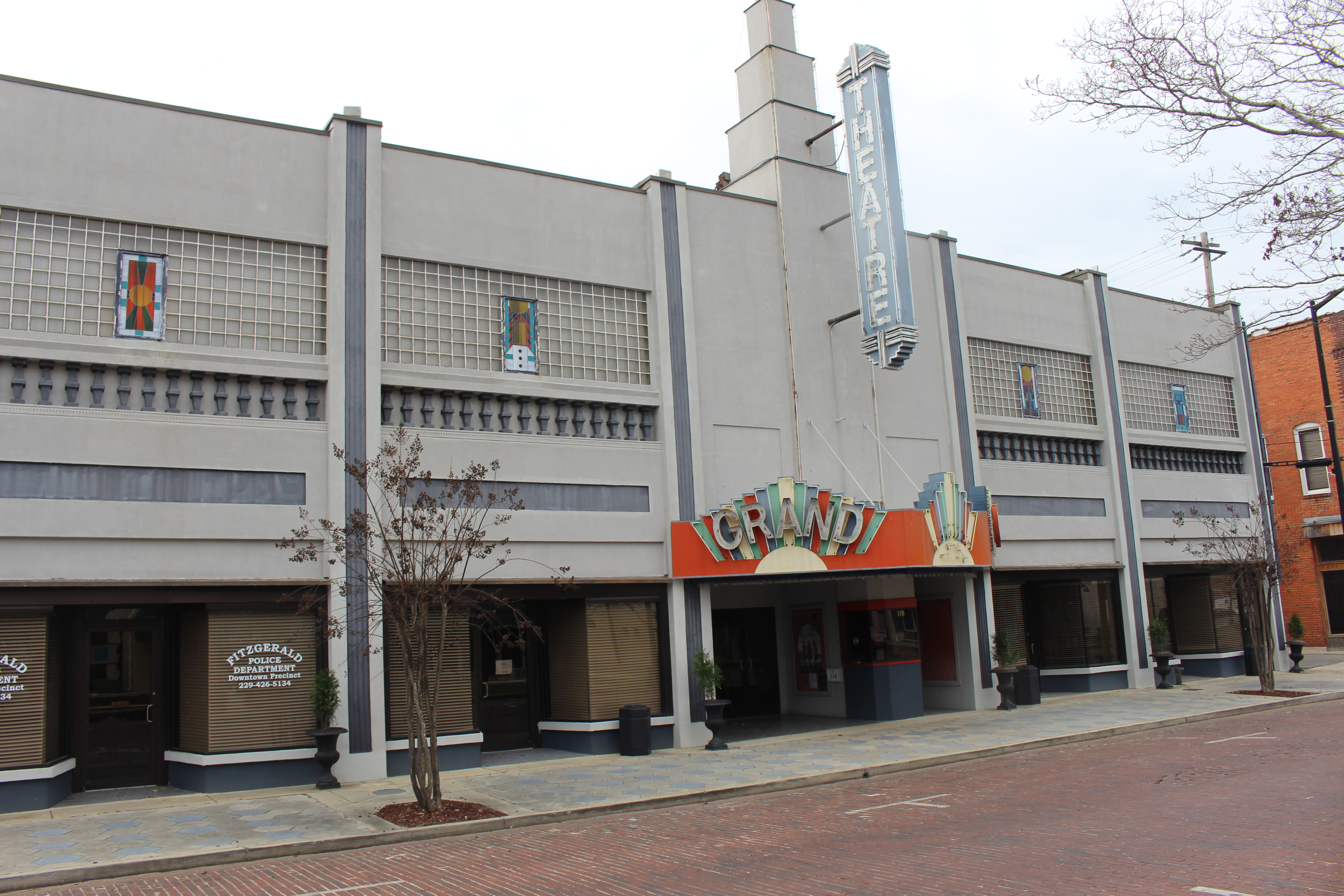
- From top, left to right: Fitzgerald City Hall, Herald-Leader Building, City of Fitzgerald Water Tower, Holtzendorf Apartments, Milton Hopkins Memorial Nature Preserve, Grand Theatre

- Flag Seal
- Nicknames: City of Heritage, Little Atlanta
- Motto(s): "History, Harmony, Heritage"
- Location in Ben Hill County and the state of Georgia
- Coordinates: 31°42′56″N 83°15′23″W
- Country: United States
- State: Georgia
- Counties: Ben Hill and Irwin

Government
  - Mayor: Jason Holt

Area
  - Total: 9.13 sq mi (23.64 km^{2})
  - Land: 8.98 sq mi (23.25 km^{2})
  - Water: 0.15 sq mi (0.39 km^{2})
- Elevation: 360 ft (110 m)

Population (2020)
  - Total: 9,006
  - Density: 1,003.2/sq mi (387.34/km^{2})
- Time zone: UTC−5 (EST)
  - Summer (DST): UTC−4 (EDT)
- ZIP code: 31750
- Area code: 229
- FIPS code: 13-29528
- GNIS feature ID: 0355809
- Website: fitzgeraldga.org

Fitzgerald is a city in and the county seat of Ben Hill County in the south central portion of the U.S. state of Georgia. As of 2020, its population was 9,006. It is the principal city of the Fitzgerald micropolitan statistical area, which includes all of Ben Hill and Irwin counties. A small portion of Fitzgerald is in Irwin County.

The city is an agricultural marketing center that grows cotton, tobacco, and peanuts. It is also home to diverse manufactures including textiles, lumber, and metal products.

The city is home to the Blue and Gray Museum, the Grand Theatre, the Milton Hopkins Memorial Nature Preserve, and the Fitzgerald chicken topiary. The Ben Hill Irwin Campus of Wiregrass Georgia Technical College is in Fitzgerald.

== History ==
Fitzgerald was developed in 1895 by Philander H. Fitzgerald, a newspaper editor from Indianapolis, Indiana. A former drummer boy in the Union Army during the Civil War, he founded it as a community for war veterans–both from the Union and from the Confederacy. The majority of the first citizens (some 2700) were Union veterans. It was incorporated on December 2, 1896. The town is located less than 15 miles (24 km) from the site where Confederate president Jefferson Davis was captured on May 10, 1865.

Fitzgerald was an early planned city. It was laid out as a square, with intersecting streets dividing it into four wards. Each ward was divided into four blocks and each block had sixteen squares. The first two streets running north–south on the west side of the city were named after Confederate generals Robert E. Lee and Joseph E. Johnston, whereas the first two on the east side were named after Union generals Ulysses S. Grant and William T. Sherman.

After about a year, the residents planned a Thanksgiving harvest parade. Separate Union and Confederate parades were planned. But when the band struck up to play, the Confederates joined the Union veterans to march as one under the US flag. At the time there was increasing reconciliation nationwide between white soldiers of the North and South; historian David Blight notes that outstanding issues of race were pushed aside. In this era, Southern states had already begun to pass new constitutions that raised barriers to voter registration, following Mississippi's in 1890, and essentially disenfranchised most freedmen and many poor whites. By 1900, Fitzgerald was a sundown town, prohibiting African Americans from living there.

In recent years the unofficial, and sometimes controversial, mascot of the city has become the red junglefowl, a wild chicken native to the Indian subcontinent. In the late 1960s, a small number were released into the woods surrounding the city and they thrive to this day.

In 2019, work began on the Fitzgerald Chicken Topiary, a 62-foot (19 m) tall statue of a chicken near the town center. The statue was envisioned by Mayor Jim Puckett to be a major roadside attraction with an Airbnb inside. After spending $300,000 of city funds, Puckett was not reelected and the statue has not been completed. If finished, it would be the largest topiary statue in the world.

== Geography ==
Fitzgerald is located in Southeast Georgia at 31°42′56″N 83°15′23″W (31.715432, -83.256464). U.S. Route 129 passes through the center of the city, leading north to Abbeville, Hawkinsville, and eventually Macon, and south to Ocilla, Nashville, and Lakeland. U.S. Route 319 also passes through Fitzgerald, leading northeast to McRae and Dublin and southwest to Tifton.

According to the United States Census Bureau, the city has a total area of 9.0 square miles (23.3 km^{2}), of which 8.8 square miles (22.9 km^{2}) is land and 0.15 square miles (0.4 km^{2}), or 1.64%, is water.

=== Climate ===
Climate data for Fitzgerald, Georgia, 1991–2020 normals, extremes 1898–2006
| Month | Jan | Feb | Mar | Apr | May | Jun | Jul | Aug | Sep | Oct | Nov | Dec | Year |
|---|---|---|---|---|---|---|---|---|---|---|---|---|---|
| Record high °F (°C) | 84 (29) | 89 (32) | 95 (35) | 95 (35) | 102 (39) | 104 (40) | 106 (41) | 104 (40) | 102 (39) | 97 (36) | 92 (33) | 85 (29) | 106 (41) |
| Mean daily maximum °F (°C) | 60.1 (15.6) | 64.1 (17.8) | 70.6 (21.4) | 78.0 (25.6) | 84.8 (29.3) | 89.4 (31.9) | 92.4 (33.6) | 90.8 (32.7) | 86.8 (30.4) | 79.5 (26.4) | 69.3 (20.7) | 62.5 (16.9) | 77.4 (25.2) |
| Daily mean °F (°C) | 49.3 (9.6) | 52.7 (11.5) | 58.9 (14.9) | 65.6 (18.7) | 73.5 (23.1) | 79.6 (26.4) | 82.5 (28.1) | 81.1 (27.3) | 76.3 (24.6) | 67.5 (19.7) | 57.4 (14.1) | 51.5 (10.8) | 66.3 (19.1) |
| Mean daily minimum °F (°C) | 38.6 (3.7) | 41.4 (5.2) | 47.3 (8.5) | 53.3 (11.8) | 62.3 (16.8) | 69.8 (21.0) | 72.5 (22.5) | 71.3 (21.8) | 65.9 (18.8) | 55.6 (13.1) | 45.5 (7.5) | 40.5 (4.7) | 55.3 (12.9) |
| Record low °F (°C) | 4 (−16) | −1 (−18) | 17 (−8) | 32 (0) | 42 (6) | 50 (10) | 59 (15) | 55 (13) | 41 (5) | 29 (−2) | 18 (−8) | 7 (−14) | −1 (−18) |
| Average precipitation inches (mm) | 4.08 (104) | 3.77 (96) | 4.61 (117) | 3.76 (96) | 2.62 (67) | 4.64 (118) | 4.38 (111) | 5.63 (143) | 3.42 (87) | 2.98 (76) | 2.83 (72) | 4.92 (125) | 47.64 (1,212) |
| Average precipitation days (≥ 0.01 in) | 8.5 | 7.3 | 8.4 | 5.9 | 5.8 | 11.6 | 9.6 | 10.2 | 6.8 | 5.7 | 6.6 | 6.5 | 92.9 |
Source 1: NOAA
Source 2: XMACIS2

== Demographics ==
Historical population
| Census | Pop. | Note | %± |
|---|---|---|---|
| 1900 | 1,817 | | — |
| 1910 | 5,795 | | 218.9% |
| 1920 | 6,870 | | 18.6% |
| 1930 | 6,412 | | −6.7% |
| 1940 | 7,388 | | 15.2% |
| 1950 | 8,130 | | 10.0% |
| 1960 | 8,781 | | 8.0% |
| 1970 | 8,187 | | −6.8% |
| 1980 | 10,187 | | 24.4% |
| 1990 | 8,612 | | −15.5% |
| 2000 | 8,758 | | 1.7% |
| 2010 | 9,053 | | 3.4% |
| 2020 | 9,006 | | −0.5% |
U.S. Decennial Census

=== 2020 census ===
Fitzgerald racial composition as of 2020
| Race | Num. | Perc. |
|---|---|---|
| White (non-Hispanic) | 3,392 | 37.66% |
| Black or African American (non-Hispanic) | 4,804 | 53.34% |
| Native American | 38 | 0.42% |
| Asian | 74 | 0.82% |
| Other/Mixed | 295 | 3.28% |
| Hispanic or Latino | 403 | 4.47% |

As of the 2020 census, Fitzgerald had a population of 9,006. The median age was 39.4 years. 24.5% of residents were under the age of 18 and 17.5% of residents were 65 years of age or older. For every 100 females there were 87.7 males, and for every 100 females age 18 and over there were 83.1 males age 18 and over.

95.9% of residents lived in urban areas, while 4.1% lived in rural areas.

There were 3,743 households in Fitzgerald, of which 30.2% had children under the age of 18 living in them. Of all households, 27.8% were married-couple households, 21.5% were households with a male householder and no spouse or partner present, and 44.1% were households with a female householder and no spouse or partner present. About 36.4% of all households were made up of individuals and 14.7% had someone living alone who was 65 years of age or older. The city had 1,932 families.

There were 4,307 housing units, of which 13.1% were vacant. The homeowner vacancy rate was 2.2% and the rental vacancy rate was 4.8%.

By 2022 a part of the city was in Irwin County, but no people lived in that portion.

== Arts and culture ==
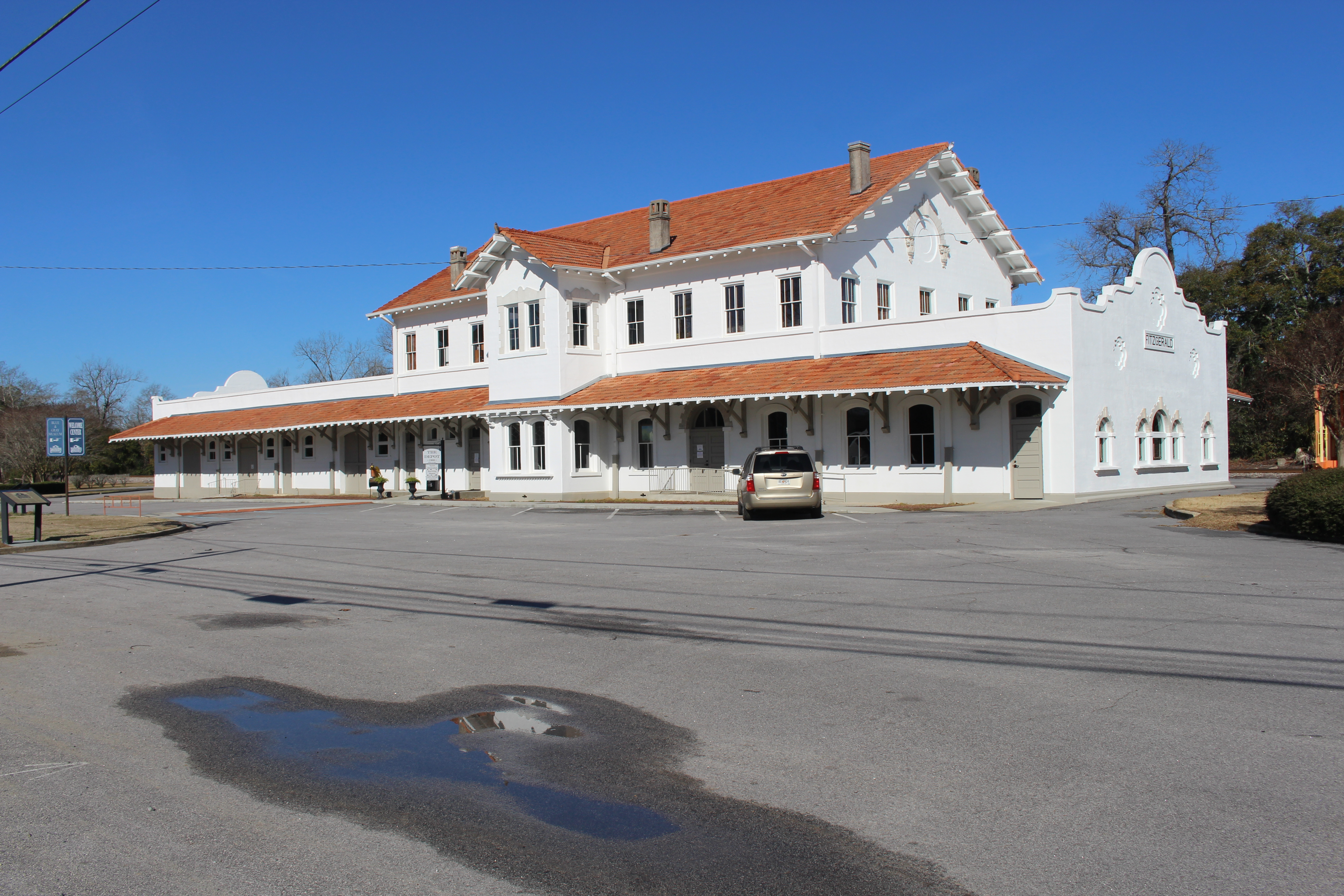
The Blue and Grey Museum in the AB&A Historical Train Depot

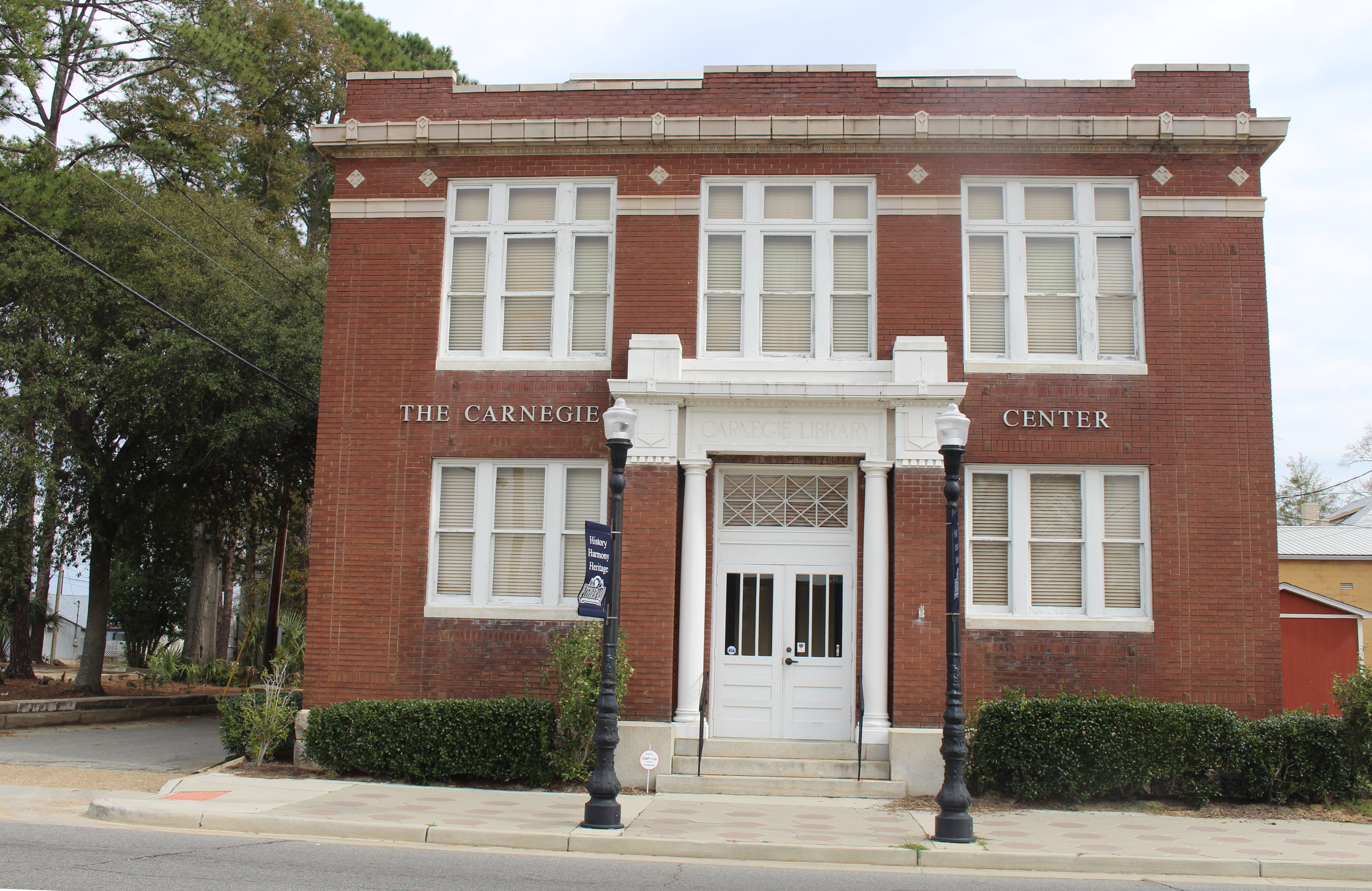
The Carnegie Center, Fitzgerald

The Dorminy-Massee House is now operated as a bed and breakfast. J. J. (Captain Jack) Dorminy built it in 1915 for his family; the two-story, colonial-style home is listed on the National Register of Historic Places.

The Blue and Gray Museum, located in the town's AB&A 1908 railroad depot, houses several artifacts that tell the story of the town's founding. The town also has a city government owned art gallery located in the Carnegie library on the edge of downtown.

The Grand Theatre is a restored 1936 Art-Deco movie theater located on Main Street. The cinema is still in operation and seats over 600 patrons in its auditorium. It is also equipped for live concert and drama shows.

The City of Fitzgerald puts on the annual Wild Chicken Festival in March to celebrate the wild Burmese chickens roaming the city. The festival includes a parade, artisan market, live music, street vendors, a 5K run, a crowing contest, and a pinewood derby.

The Fitzgerald Tour of Homes is an event hosted annually and put on by the Fitzgerald Lions Club. It occurs in December and features open tours of local houses decorated for Christmas.

== Government and infrastructure ==
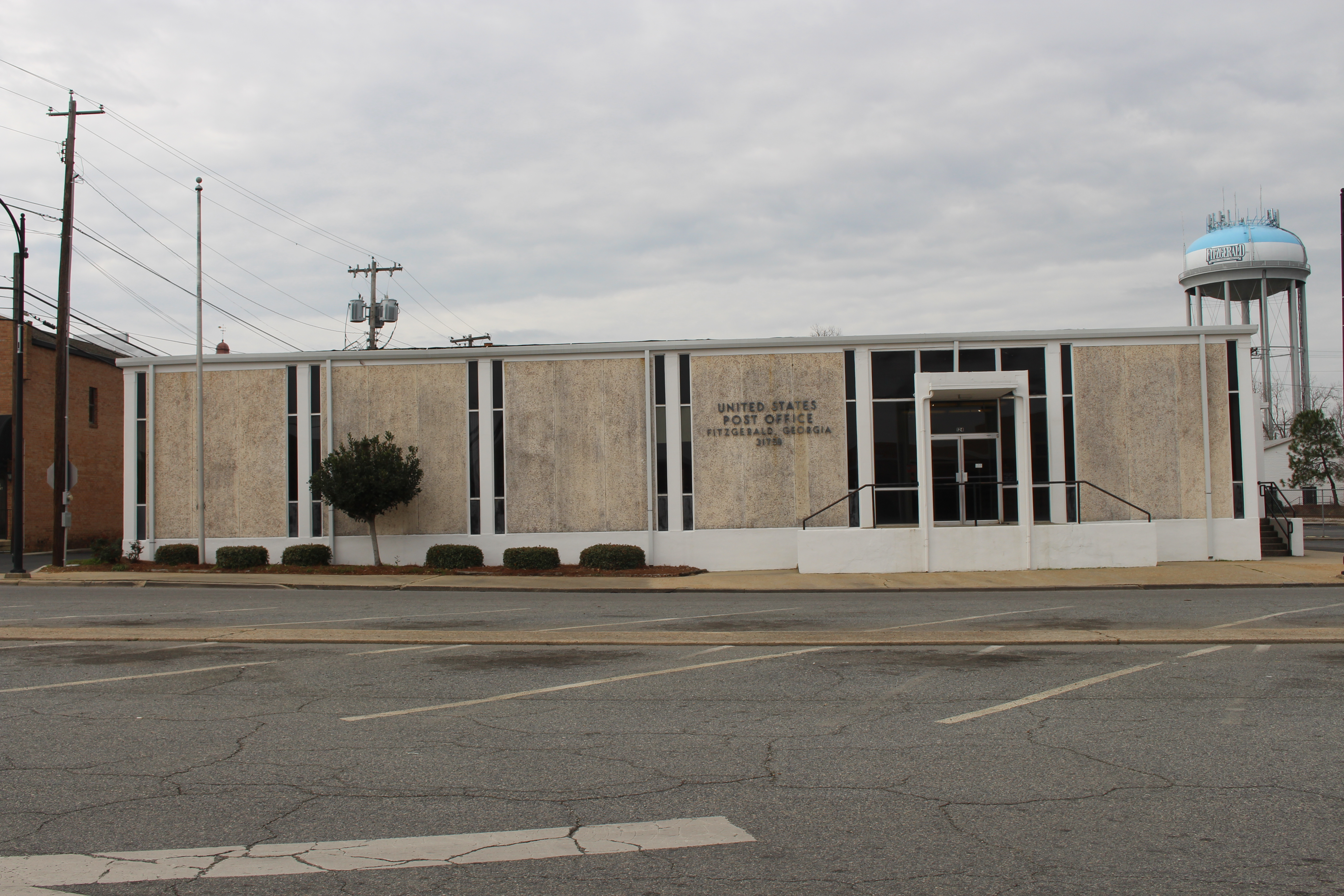
Fitzgerald Post Office

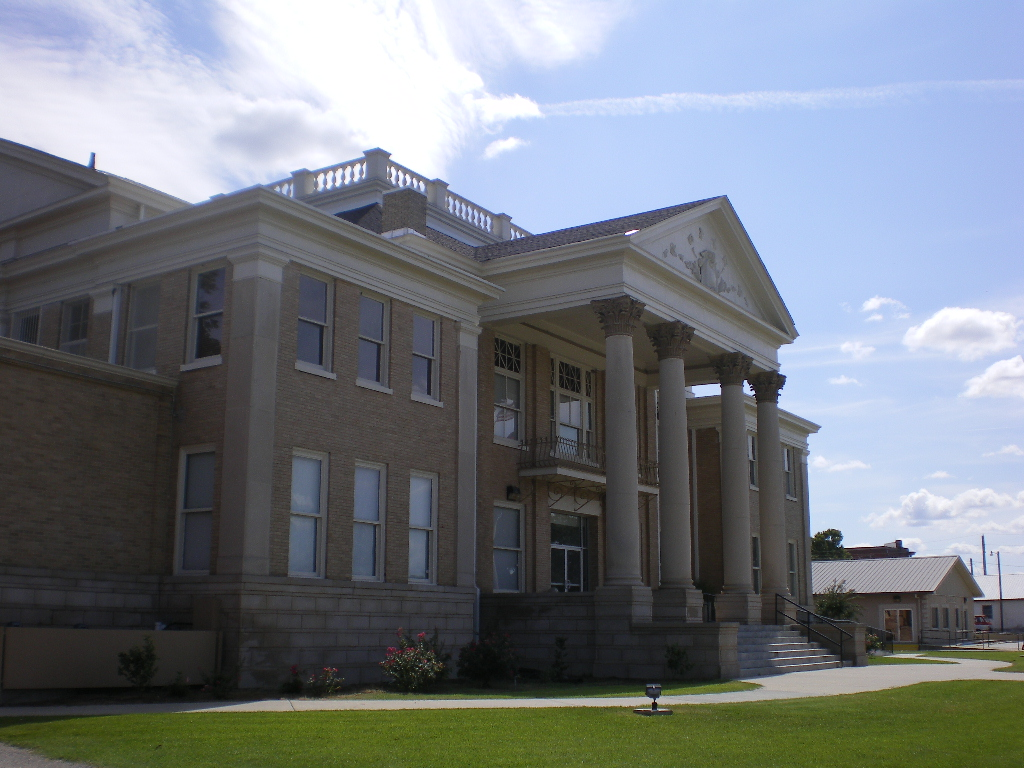
Ben Hill County Courthouse

The U.S. Postal Service operates the Fitzgerald Post Office. The city is the county seat, hosting the Ben Hill County Courthouse.

== Education ==
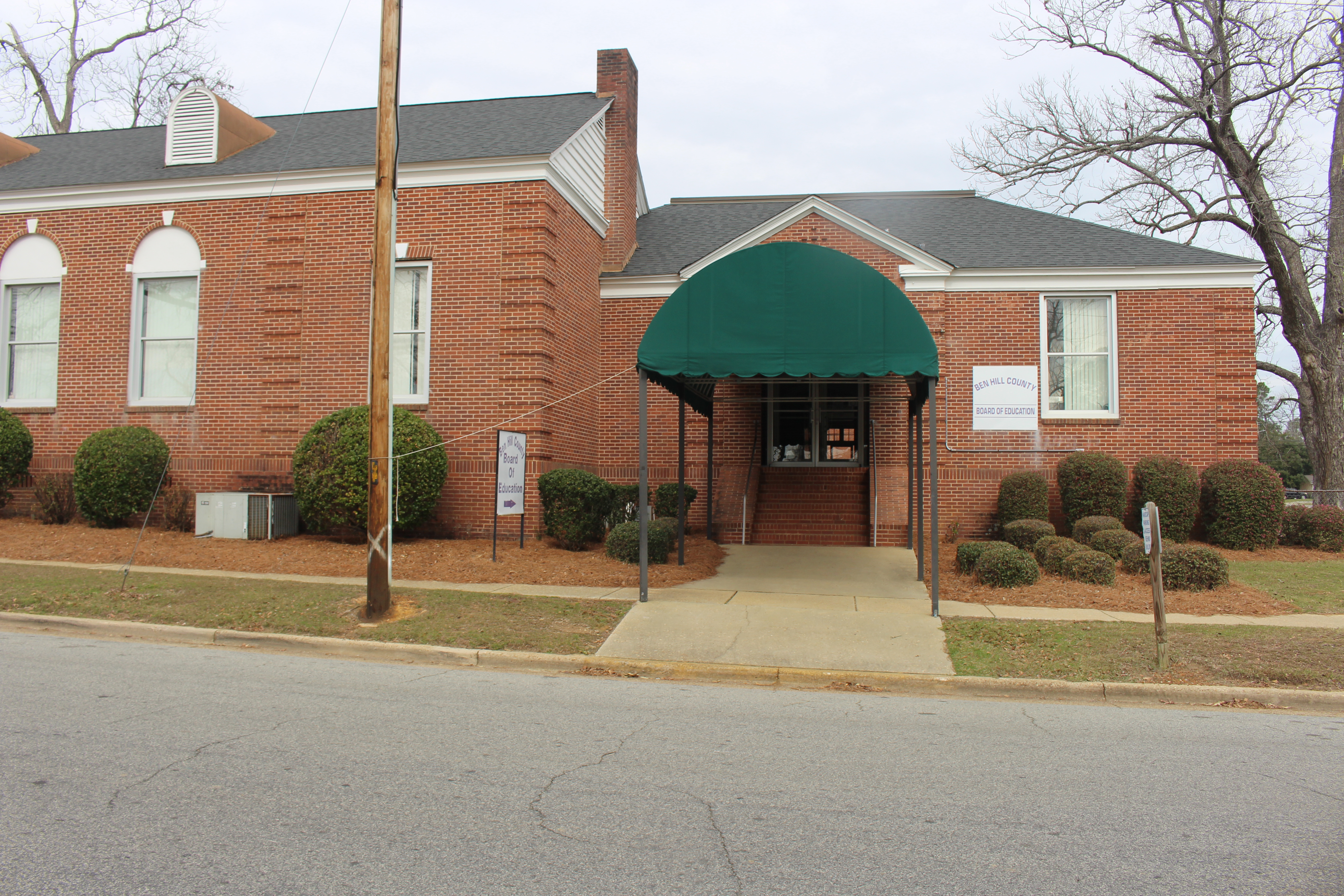
Ben Hill County School District headquarters

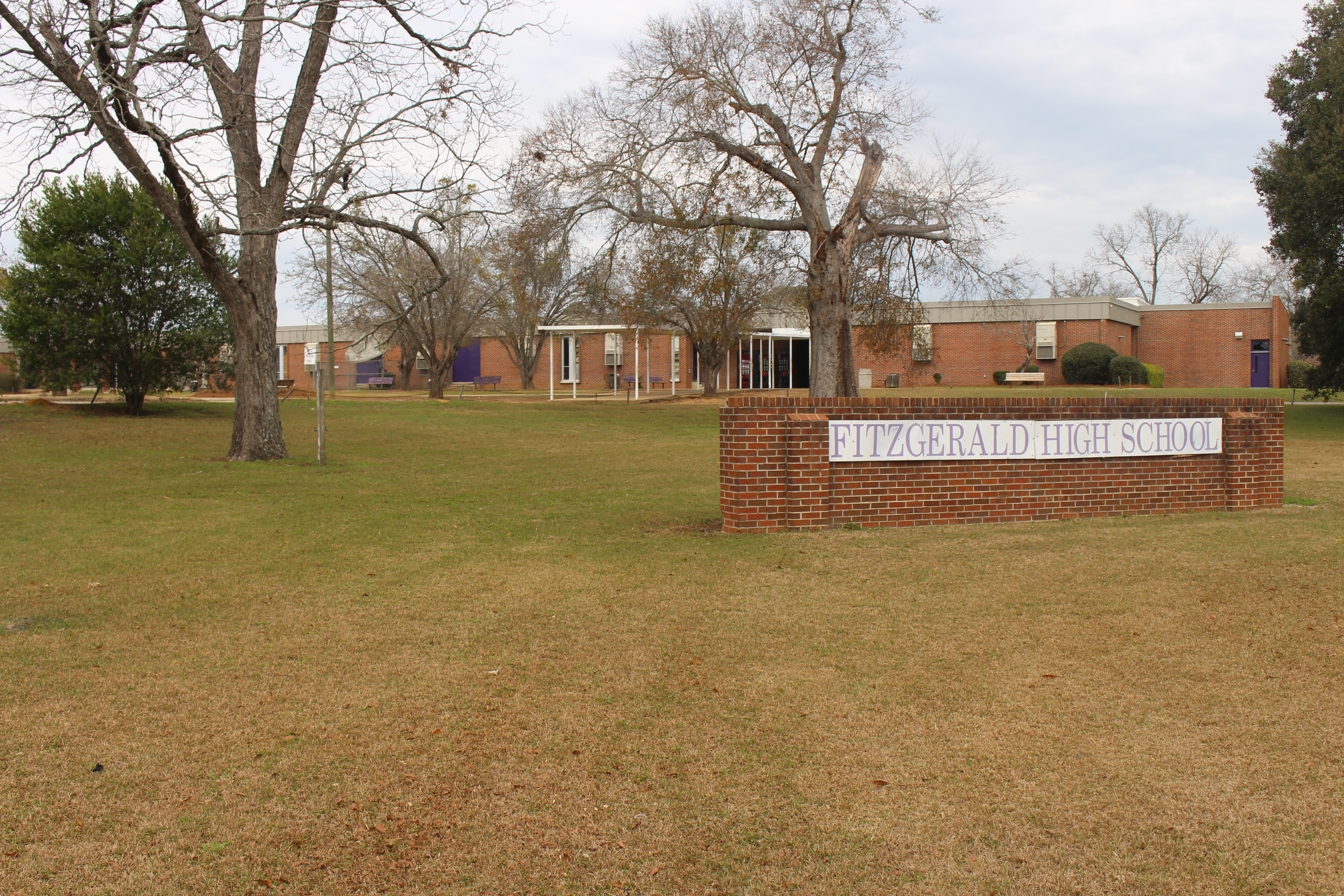
Fitzgerald High School

The Ben Hill County School District, which includes all of Ben Hill County, conducts pre-school to grade twelve, and consists of one pre-school, one primary school, an elementary school, a middle school, and a high school. The district has 217 full-time teachers and over 3,395 students.

- Ben Hill County PreK
- Ben Hill County Primary School
- Ben Hill County Elementary School
- Ben Hill County Even Start
- Ben Hill County Middle School
- Fitzgerald High School College and Career Academy

While the Irwin County portion is in the Irwin County School District, as of 2022 no people live in that portion.

Wiregrass Georgia Technical College – Ben Hill-Irwin Campus is located on the southern end of the county.

== Media ==
- WRDO Real Radio 96.9
- Herald Leader Newspaper (Fitzgerald)
  - WSWG, CBS TV
  - CW44, CW TV
  - WSWG2, My Network TV
- WOKA Dixie Country 106.7
- WOBB B-100
- WSIZ Radio MyFM 102.3 (Fitzgerald) @ 99.9 (Douglas)

== Minor league baseball teams ==
Fitzgerald was home to a minor league baseball team in the Georgia State League from 1948, the league's first season of operation, through 1952. The team was called the Fitzgerald Pioneers. The club had no affiliation with any major league club during the five seasons of operation in the Georgia State League. After the 1952 season, the Fitzgerald Pioneers relocated to Sandersville and became the Sandersville Wacos, which were affiliated with the Milwaukee Braves for the 1953 season. The team ended their last season in 1956, under different affiliation.

Fitzgerald got a replacement team for the Pioneers in 1953 when the Moultrie Giants of the Georgia–Florida League moved to town. The Moultrie club was a charter member of the Georgia–Florida League when it began operations in 1946. After relocating to Fitzgerald and becoming an affiliate of the Cincinnati Redlegs, the new edition of the Fitzgerald Pioneers lasted one season (1954) saw the team name changed to the Fitzgerald Redlegs. After two years in Fitzgerald, the club returned to Moultrie. It ceased operating in 1958 under the name Brunswick Phillies.

After the Fitzgerald Redlegs left, the city was without a team for the 1955 season. The next year the Cordele club relocated to Fitzgerald after ten seasons in Cordele. They changed affiliation back to what were now called the Kansas City A's, and the Fitzgerald A's played for the 1956 season. In 1957, the club again changed its affiliation, to the Baltimore Orioles; the club was known as the Fitzgerald Orioles for the 1957 season. The Fitzgerald team relocated to Dublin, Georgia after the 1957 season and remained a Baltimore Orioles farm team; they played as the Dublin Orioles for the Georgia–Florida League's last year of operation. Fitzgerald has not had a minor league team in the 63 years since.

== Notable people ==
- Morris B. Abram, president of Brandeis University and civil rights leader
- Brainard Cheney, author
- Neal Colzie, NFL defensive back
- General Raymond G. Davis, USMC, World War II hero, Korean War Medal of Honor recipient, Commander of the 3rd Marine Division in 1968–69 in Vietnam, and Assistant Commandant of the Marine Corps 1971–72
- Ulysses Davis, folk artist and sculptor
- Chief Justice Norman S. Fletcher
- Abner Jay, blues musician
- Frances Mayes, author
- Charlie Paulk, seventh pick of 1968 NBA draft
- Jason Poe, NFL offensive guard
- Joe Reliford, youngest professional baseball player
- Lecitus Smith, NFL guard
- Forrest Towns, 1936 Summer Olympics track star
- Jemea Thomas, former NFL cornerback
- Mary Verner, politician, Mayor of Spokane, Washington

== See also ==
- List of sundown towns in the United States
