= Georgia Interscholastic Association =

High school athletic league during segregation

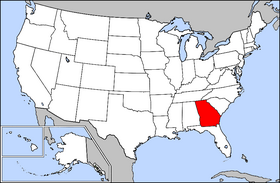
- Abbreviation: GIA
- Merged into: Georgia High School Association
- Formation: 1948; 78 years ago
- Dissolved: 1970; 56 years ago
- Purpose: sports league of high schools serving African Americans
- Region served: Georgia
- Official language: English

The Georgia Interscholastic Association (GIA), formed in 1948, was a sports league of high schools serving African Americans in Georgia. It merged into the Georgia High School Association with desegregation in 1970. As If We Were Ghosts is a documentary film made about the league and its athletes. The Georgia Interscholastic Association held state championship competitions from 1948–70 and joined the Georgia High School Association the following year.

== History ==
The Big 7 Conference included large high schools for African American students in Georgia. The GIA was an expansion of this league that grew to include county high schools around the state. High schools for African Americans from 147 of Georgia's 159 counties came to be included in the league.

Walt Frazier, Wyomia Tyus, Otis Sistrunk, Monk Johnson, Rayfield Wright. Don Adams, Willie Seay, and Edith McGuire emerged from the league. Seay went on to star on Albany State University's track team and carried the Olympic torch before the 1996 Olympics in Atlanta, Georgia. Becky Taylor who works at the Tifton Gazette has been researching the league for years. Herb White, nicknamed the Elevator from Decatur, worked on the documentary film about the league. A high school basketball, star he went on to play for the Atlanta Hawks.

The GIA grew to include high schools for African American students from 147 of Georgia's 159 counties. After the film was broadcast the filmmakers and some of those featured in the film participated in a panel discussion moderated by Ann Kimbrough.

== High schools ==
- Henry McNeal Turner High School in northwest Atlanta
- Washington High School in southwest Atlanta
- South Fulton High School in East Point, Georgia
- Ballard-Hudson High School in Macon
- Alfred E. Beach High School in Savannah
- David T. Howard High School in Northeast Atlanta
- Carver High School in Southeast Atlanta
- South Fulton High School in East Point
- Josey High School in Augusta
- Central High School in Springfield
- Atkinson County Training High School in Pearson
- Appling High School in Macon
- Eva Thomas High School in College Park
- Harrison High School in West Point
- Risley High School in BrunswicK
- Carver High School in Dawson
- Lee Street High School in Blackshear
- Hutto High School in Bainbridge
- Macon County Training High School in Montezuma
- Holsey-Cobb Institute in Cordele
- Thomaston Training School in Wayne County
- Training School in Jesup
- Hill High School in LaFayette
- Edison Negro High School
- Alma Consolidated High School
- Fairmont High School in Griffin
- Richland High & Industrial
- Hunt High School in Fort Valley
- Haralson County Consolidated High School in Waco
- Monitor High School in Fitzgerald
- Harrison High School in West Point
- South Fulton High School in East Point
- Central High School in McRae
- George W. Drake High School in Thomaston
- R. L. Cousins High School in Douglasville
- Bethune High School in Folkston
- West End School in Hogansville
- Ralph Bunche High School in Canton
- St. Pius X High School in Savannah
- Eureka School
- Liberty County High School
- Bailey-Johnson School in Alpharetta
- Calhoun Crawford County Training School in Roberta
- Whitman Street High School in Toccoa
- Stephens High School in Calhoun
- Lucy Craft Laney High School in Augusta, Georgia
- Luther Judson Price High School in southeast Atlanta
- Sophronia Tompkins High School (became Woodville-Tompkins)
- Houston High School, Indians
- Wilson High School
- William H. Spencer High School in Columbus
- Ralph Bunche High School
- Dasher High School
- Pinevale High School in Valdosta, the Fighting Tigers
- Boggs Academy, a Presbyterian parochial school
- Elm Street High School, now Rockmart Middle School
- Cedar Hill High School in Cedartown, Georgia
- William Bryant High School in Moultrie, formerly Moultrie High School for Negro Youth It became a junior high school after integration
- Lemon Street High School of Marietta, the Hornets
- Elder High School in Sandersville, Georgia
- Maggie Califf High School in Gray, Georgia
- Peabody High School in Eastman, Georgia
