= Earl Wheby =

American football player and coach (1915–2004)

Biographical details
- Born: December 12, 1915; Princeton, West Virginia, U.S.
- Died: March 27, 2004 (aged 88); Roswell, Georgia, U.S.

Playing career
- 1938–1939: Georgia Tech
- 1941: New York Yankees
- Position: Halfback

Coaching career (HC unless noted)
- 1946–1947: West Georgia
- 1948: Fitzgerald HS (GA)
- 1949–1951: Athens HS (GA)
- 1953: McDonough HS (GA)

Head coaching record
- Overall: 30–21–1 (high school)

Earl M. Wheby (December 12, 1915 – March 27, 2004) was an American football player and coach. He served as the head coach at the University of West Georgia from 1946 to 1947.

He played college football at Georgia Tech and played professionally for one season for the New York Yankees of the American Association in 1941
