= Jemea Thomas =

American football player (born 1990)

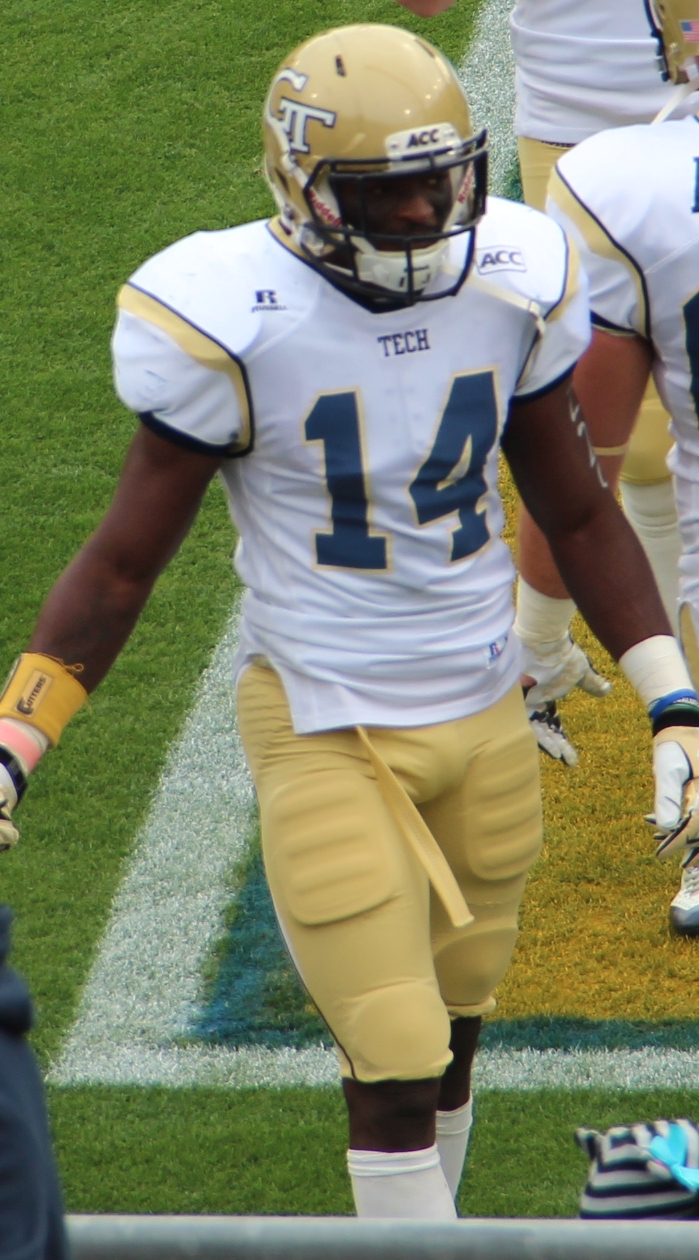
- Thomas with the Georgia Tech Yellow Jackets in 2013

No. 35
- Position: Cornerback / Safety

Personal information
- Born: April 7, 1990 (age 36); Fitzgerald, Georgia, U.S.
- Listed height: 5 ft 10 in (1.78 m)
- Listed weight: 195 lb (88 kg)

Career information
- High school: Fitzgerald
- College: Georgia Tech
- NFL draft: 2014: 6th round, 206th overall pick

Career history
- New England Patriots (2014)*; Dallas Cowboys (2014)*; St. Louis Rams (2014); Tennessee Titans (2014)
- * Offseason or practice squad member only
- Stats at Pro Football Reference

Jemea I. Thomas (born April 7, 1990) is an American former professional football player who was a cornerback in the National Football League (NFL). He was selected by the New England Patriots in the sixth round of the 2014 NFL draft. He played college football for the Georgia Tech Yellow Jackets.

== Early life ==
A native of Fitzgerald, Georgia, Thomas attended Fitzgerald High School, where he was named the 2008 AJC Class AA Defensive Player of the Year. As a senior in 2008, he rushed for 518 yards on 59 carries (8.8 yards avg) and seven touchdowns. Defensively, he had 140 tackles with three blocked field goals and four interceptions. Had Jersey retired.

Considered a three-star recruit by Rivals.com, he was rated as the 36th best athlete prospect of his class.

== College career ==
Thomas attended Georgia Tech and played for the Yellow Jackets from 2009 to 2013. As a true freshman, he appeared in all 14 games in a back-up role, recording 10 tackles, a fumble recovery, and a pass break-up. In 2010, he was redshirted due to the depth of the safety position. In 2011, Thomas returned to action to play in all 13 games, including two starts. He recorded three interceptions, which led the team, 50 tackles, including four for loss and two sacks. In 2012, he started all 14 games, and ranked second on the team in tackles with 86, and first on the team in interceptions with four. In 2013, he played and started in all 13 games, and led the team in tackles (88) and pass break-ups (8). He also added two interceptions and two forced fumbles.

== Professional career ==
=== New England Patriots ===
Thomas was selected by the New England Patriots in the sixth round (206th overall) of the 2014 NFL draft. On May 18, 2014, the Patriots signed Thomas to a four-year deal. He was released on August 26.

=== Dallas Cowboys ===
On August 27, 2014, Thomas was claimed off waivers by the Dallas Cowboys. On September 1, he was cut and signed to the practice squad one day later. He was released on September 16.

=== St. Louis Rams ===
On September 19, 2014, the St. Louis Rams signed Thomas to the practice squad. On October 25, he was promoted to the active roster. On October 29, he was released and re-signed to the practice squad 2 days later.

=== Tennessee Titans ===
On December 3, 2014, Thomas was signed by the Tennessee Titans from the St. Louis Rams practice squad. He was released by the team on September 4, 2015.
