= National Register of Historic Places listings in Glynn County, Georgia =

Map of Georgia with Glynn County highlighted

This is a list of properties and districts in Glynn County, Georgia that are listed on the National Register of Historic Places (NRHP).

This National Park Service list is complete through NPS recent listings posted July 11, 2025.

== Current listings ==
	Name on the Register	Image	Date listed	Location	City or town	Description
1	Ballard School	Ballard School	October 27, 2004 (#04001181)	323 Old Jesup Hwy. 31°12′17″N 81°30′22″W	Brunswick	
2	Brunswick Old Town	Brunswick Old Town	December 2, 1974 (#74000683)	Address Restricted	Brunswick	An archeological area seven blocks long and three blocks wide along Bay Street, it was leveled in 1974 (from NRHP #79000727)
3	Brunswick Old Town Historic District	Brunswick Old Town Historic District	April 26, 1979 (#79000727)	Roughly bounded by 1st, Bay, New Bay, H and Cochran Sts. 31°08′43″N 81°29′29″W	Brunswick	An area slightly larger than the original city plan
4	Colored Memorial School and Risley High School	Colored Memorial School and Risley High School	November 7, 2002 (#02001290)	1800 Albany St. 31°09′20″N 81°29′28″W	Brunswick	
5	Dixville Historic District	Dixville Historic District	December 9, 2019 (#100004744)	Bounded by rear property lines along Walnut Ave., Palmetto Ave. to Prince St., Martin Luther King Jr. Blvd. & Stonewall St. 31°08′45″N 81°29′06″W	Brunswick	
6	Faith Chapel	Faith Chapel	July 14, 1971 (#71000277)	Old Plantation Rd. 31°03′38″N 81°25′18″W	Jekyll Island	
7	Fort Frederica National Monument	Fort Frederica National Monument	October 15, 1966 (#66000065)	12 mi. N of Brunswick; 31°13′26″N 81°23′36″W	St. Simons Island	administered by the National Park Service; boundary increase approved July 23, 2020
8	Glynn Academy	Glynn Academy	November 4, 2011 (#11000775)	Southeast corner of Egmont and Monck Sts. 31°08′55″N 81°29′26″W	Brunswick	Apparently the 1840 Glynn Acad. Building is on the NRHP itself, while three buildings are contributing properties to Brunswick Old Town HD
9	Hamilton Plantation slave cabins	Hamilton Plantation slave cabins	June 30, 1988 (#88000968)	Address Restricted (on Gascoigne Bluff, 100 Arthur J. Moore Drive); 31°10′16″N 81°24′28″W	St. Simons Island	Two unusually well-built slave cabins (a duplex), built before 1833; summer tours given by Cassina Garden Club
10	Hofwyl-Broadfield Plantation	Hofwyl-Broadfield Plantation	July 12, 1976 (#76000635)	N of Brunswick at 5556 U.S. Highway 17 North; 31°18′18″N 81°27′13″W	Brunswick	Rice plantation from 1800 to 1915, the main house was built in the early 1850s. Now a Georgia state historic site.
11	Horton-duBignon House, Brewery Ruins, duBignon Cemetery	Horton-duBignon House, Brewery Ruins, duBignon Cemetery	September 28, 1971 (#71000278)	Riverview Dr. 31°06′06″N 81°24′52″W	Jekyll Island	May be known as Horton House
12	Jekyll Island Historic District	Jekyll Island Historic District	January 20, 1972 (#72000385)	Between Riverview Dr. and Old Village Blvd. 31°03′34″N 81°25′20″W	Jekyll Island	This historic district is a National Historic Landmark.
13	King and Prince Hotel	King and Prince Hotel	January 12, 2005 (#04001465)	201 Arnold Rd. 31°08′21″N 81°22′44″W	St. Simons Island	
14	Needwood Baptist Church and School	Needwood Baptist Church and School	December 17, 1998 (#98001520)	US 17, 1 mi. S of Hofwyl-Broadfield Plantation State Historic Site. 31°16′55″N 81°26′27″W	Brunswick	
15	Rockefeller Cottage	Rockefeller Cottage	July 14, 1971 (#71000279)	331 Riverview Dr. 31°03′27″N 81°25′19″W	Jekyll Island	Also known as Indian Mound Cottage
16	St. Simons Lighthouse and Lighthouse Keepers' Building	St. Simons Lighthouse and Lighthouse Keepers' Building	April 13, 1972 (#72000386)	600 Beachview Dr. 31°08′03″N 81°23′37″W	St. Simons Island	
17	Strachan House Garage	Strachan House Garage	July 3, 1997 (#97000660)	414½ Butler Ave. 31°08′07″N 81°23′53″W	St. Simons Island	Two-story garage and residence built in 1925, formerly associated with an estate that no longer exists, converted to a residence-only.
18	US Coast Guard Station-St. Simons Island	US Coast Guard Station-St. Simons Island	April 1, 1998 (#98000297)	4201 First St. 31°08′44″N 81°22′23″W	St. Simons Island	Now houses the World War II Homefront Museum
19	United States Post Office and Court House	United States Post Office and Court House	April 15, 2014 (#14000153)	805 Gloucester; 31°09′01″N 81°29′33″W	Brunswick	Frank M. Scarlett Federal Building houses the Post Office and Federal Court
20	Windsor Park Historic District	Windsor Park Historic District	November 29, 2013 (#13000877)	Bounded by Lanier Blvd., Walnut Ave., Gloucester & Magnolia Sts. 31°08′57″N 81°28′56″W	Brunswick	
