= Ben Hill County School District =

School district in Georgia, United States

Address
- 509 West Palm Street Fitzgerald, Georgia, 31750; United States
- Coordinates: 31.710130°N 83.261025°W

District information
- Grades: Pre-kindergarten – 12
- Superintendent: Stevie Harden (Interim)

Students and staff
- Enrollment: 3,003 (2022–23)
- Faculty: 237.20 (FTE)
- Staff: 256.00 (FTE)
- Student–teacher ratio: 12.66

Other information
- Accreditation: Southern Association of Colleges and Schools; Georgia Accrediting Commission
- Telephone: (229) 409-5500
- Fax: (229) 409-5513
- Website: ben-hill.k12.ga.us

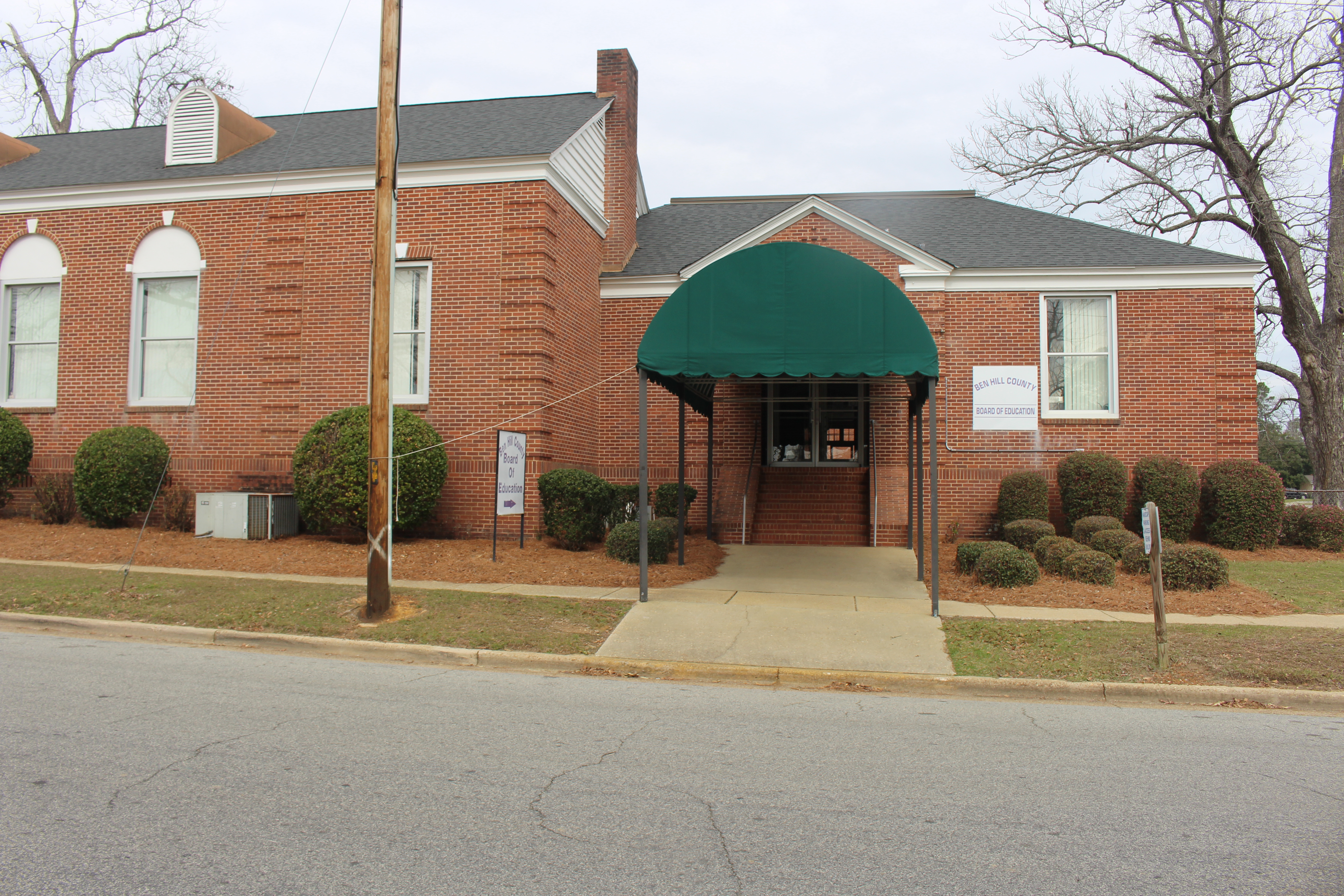
School district headquarters

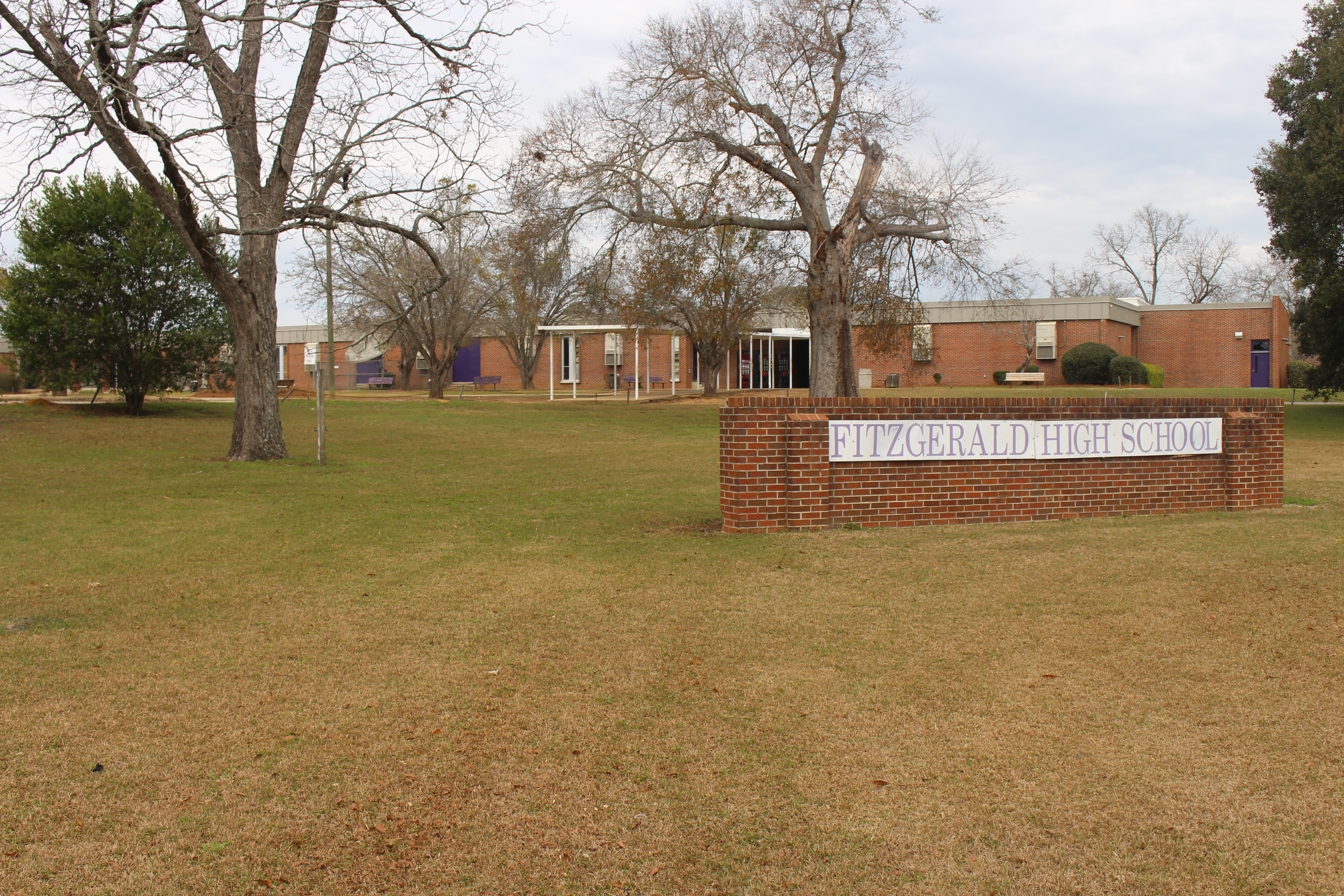
Fitzgerald High School

The Ben Hill County School District is a public school district in Ben Hill County, Georgia, United States, based in Fitzgerald.

It includes all of the county, and serves the communities of Fitzgerald and Queensland.

== Schools ==
The Ben Hill County School District has four elementary schools, one middle school, and one high school.

Elementary schools and preschools

- Ben Hill County PreK
- Ben Hill County Primary School
- Ben Hill County Elementary School
- Ben Hill County Even Start

Secondary schools

- Ben Hill Middle School
- Fitzgerald High School

Defunct schools

- Monitor Elementary-High School
