= Windsor Park Historic District =

Historic district in Georgia, United States

- U.S. National Register of Historic Places
- U.S. Historic district
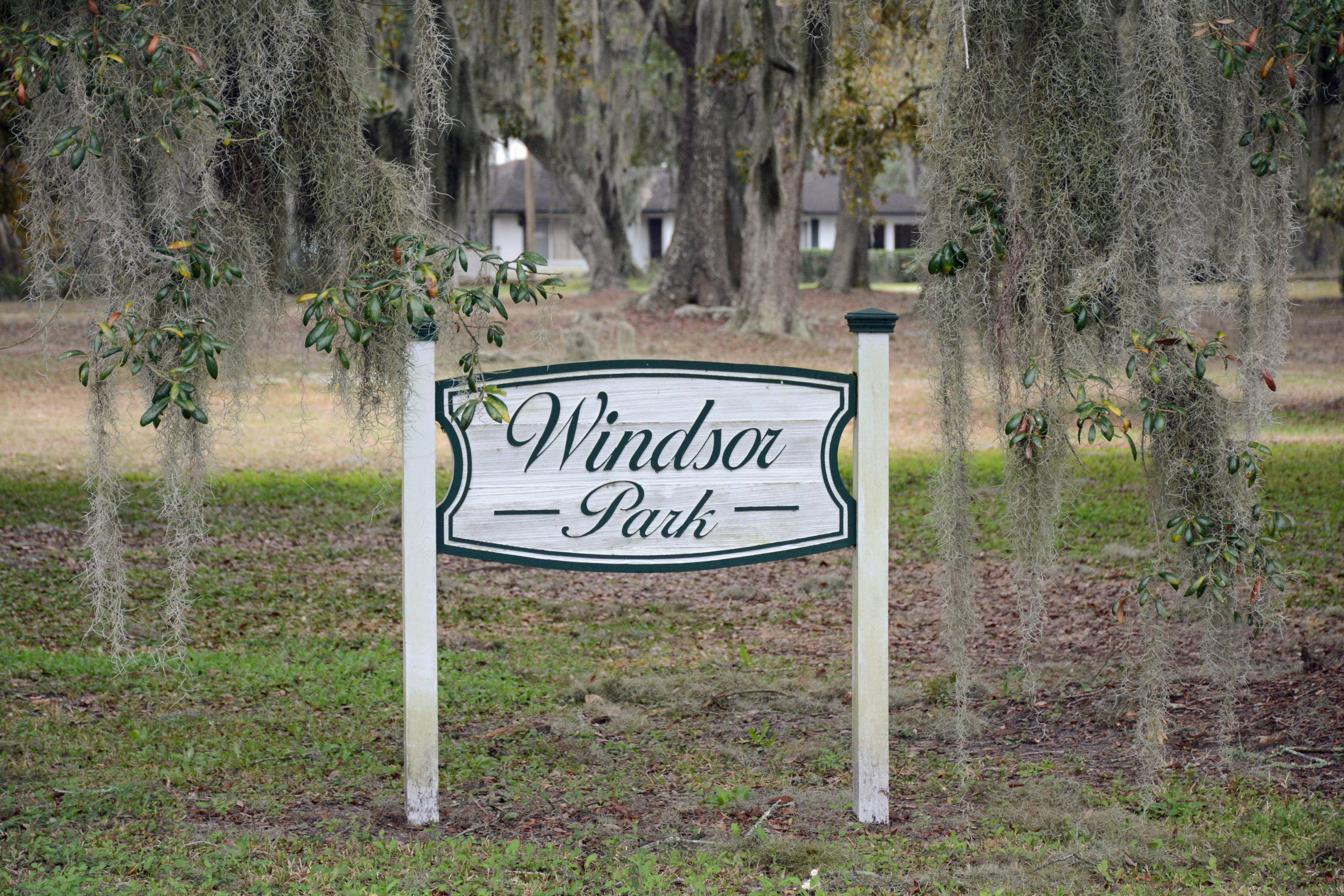
- Windsor Park sign, among the indigenous live oak trees and Spanish moss

- Location within Georgia
- Location: Bounded by Lanier Blvd., Walnut Ave., Gloucester and Magnolia Sts. Brunswick, Georgia
- Coordinates: 31°08′57″N 81°28′56″W
- NRHP reference No.: 13000877
- Added to NRHP: November 29, 2013

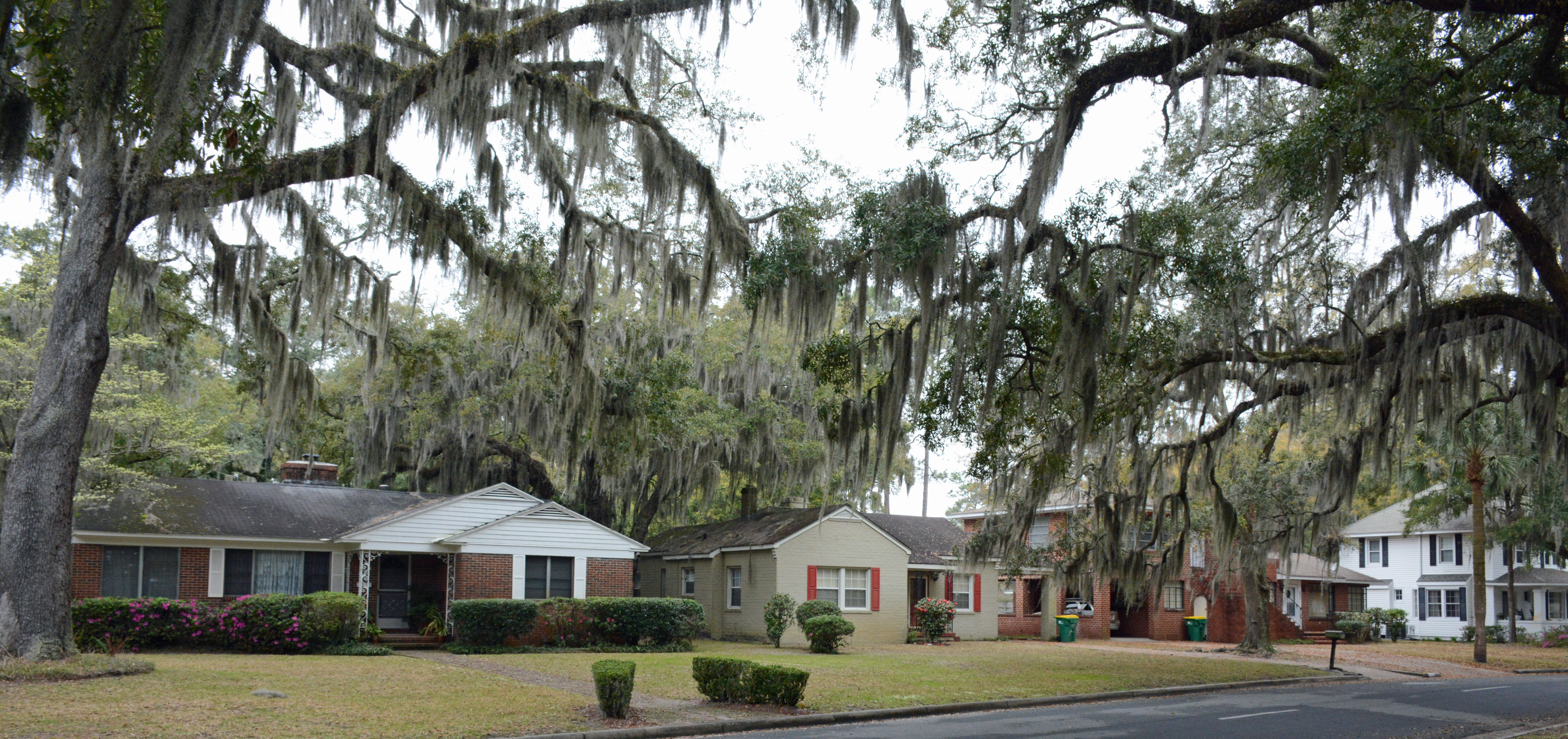
Houses in Windsor Park

Windsor Park Historic District is a historic district in Brunswick, Georgia, that is listed on the National Register of Historic Places. It is the area bounded by Lanier Blvd., Walnut Ave., Gloucester St. and Magnolia St.

== See also ==
- National Register of Historic Places listings in Glynn County, Georgia
