= James Hamilton Couper =

American planter

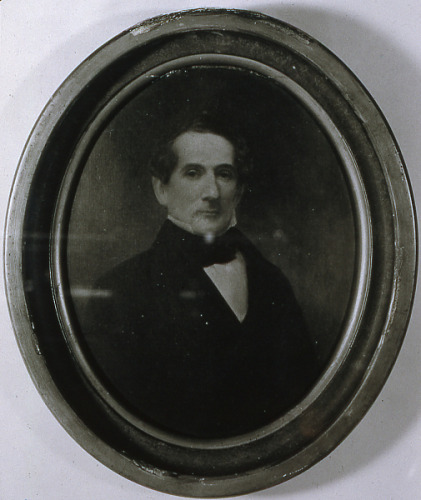
- Born: March 4, 1794; Georgia
- Died: June 3, 1866 (aged 72); St. Simons
- Alma mater: Yale College
- Occupation: Planter, slave owner

James Hamilton Couper (March 5, 1794 – July 3, 1866) was an American planter and slaver who at his peak controlled more than 1,500 slaves.

== Biography ==
Couper was born at Sunbury, Georgia, March 5, 1794. He joined the sophomore class in Yale College, in 1811, from St. Mary's College, Baltimore, and graduated in 1814. After his graduation he returned home, and in 1815 made a voyage to Europe for purposes of study and travel. On his return he became a planter, and in this occupation his life was mostly spent. His plantations attracted the especial notice of travelers, among others of Sir Charles Lyell. He labored, not without success, to improve the cultivation of cotton and rice. The experiment of pressing oil from cotton seed, in which he engaged, he abandoned after a year's trial. He was one of the contractors in the construction of the Brunswick Canal.

Couper was aboard the Pulaski steamer in June 1838 when its boiler exploded. He was one of only 59 to survive the wreck.

Couper was a man of varied culture, and Christ Church in Savannah, Georgia, planned by him, is a monument of his taste and skill in architecture. His library was among the most extensive of the private libraries in the South. He kept aloof from public life, and only on two occasions did he consent to take office. Once, when the office of sheriff in his county had become difficult and dangerous, in consequence of the effort made to defeat the collection of debts, he accepted and executed it. Again, as a delegate to the Convention called in Georgia during the excitement on the question of Nullification, he helped to defeat the plan of disunion. So, too, he was opposed to the more recent movement for secession, and during the American Civil War lived in the closest seclusion.

He married, shortly after his return from Europe, Miss Wylly, a lady of his neighborhood, who with two daughters and three sons survived him. His son Hamilton Couper (1829–1862) died of typhoid fever.

Couper died at his temporary residence Carteret's Point, Ga., July 3, 1866, aged 72 years.

This article incorporates public domain material from the Yale Obituary Record.

== Legacy ==
Couper is commemorated in the scientific name of a species of North American snake, Drymarchon couperi.

== See also ==
- Gascoigne Bluff
