= Stephens High School (Georgia) =

Defunct high school in Calhoun, Georgia

Stephens High School was a public high school for African Americans in Calhoun, Georgia. Stephens High School closed in 1966 as part of the desegregation of Calhoun City Schools, following the consolidation of Black and white schools during court-ordered integration. The closure resulted in the loss of the city's African American high school, faculty positions, and a central institution of the Black community.

It competed in the Georgia Interscholastic Association. It was the 1st school in Gordon County History (1850–1952) to win a State Championship Title -GIA CLASS C BOYS BASKETBALL STATE CHAMPIONS on March 22, 1952. It won 12 GIA CLASS C State Championship Titles in Boys and Girls Basketball as well as Boys Track & Field.

It was known statewide for its extraordinary athletic and academic program .
