= As If We Were Ghosts =

- Produced by: Herb White; Ron Bivins; Monty Ross
- Narrated by: Pam Oliver
- Production company: Ours Studios LLC
- Release date: June 13, 2022 (Georgia Public Broadcasting)
- Country: United States of America
- Language: English

As If We Were Ghosts is a 2022 documentary about the Georgia Interscholastic Association (GIA). It was first broadcast at 9 p.m. June 13 and again on June 19, Juneteenth, on Georgia Public Broadcasting, and depicts the experience of Black athletes, coaches, and cheerleaders in Georgia during the era of segregation.

Producer Ron Bivins is a real estate developer from Americus, Georgia who was a star athlete at Staley High School. The film includes interviews with Walt Frazier, Wyomia Tyus, Otis Sistruck, Monk Johnson, and Rayfield Wright. Don Adams, Willies Seay, and Edith McGuire are among the other athletes profiled in the film. Seay went on to star on Albany State University's track team and carried the Olympic torch before the 1996 Olympics in Atlanta, Georgia. Becky Taylor who works at the Tifton Gazette has been researching the league for years and assisted with the film. Herb White, nicknamed the Elevator from Decatur, also worked on the films. A high school basketball star he went on to play for the Atlanta Hawks. Ours Studios is a Black-owned and financed. Bivins is its CEO and Ann Wead Kimbrough who reported for the Atlanta Journal Constitution is its COO. Nwandi Lawson also worked on the film.

The GIA grew to include high schools for African American students from 147 of Georgia's 159 counties. After the film was broadcast the filmmakers and some of those featured in the film participated in a panel discussion moderated by Ann Kimbrough.
