= Thomas Jefferson Elder High and Industrial School =

- U.S. National Register of Historic Places
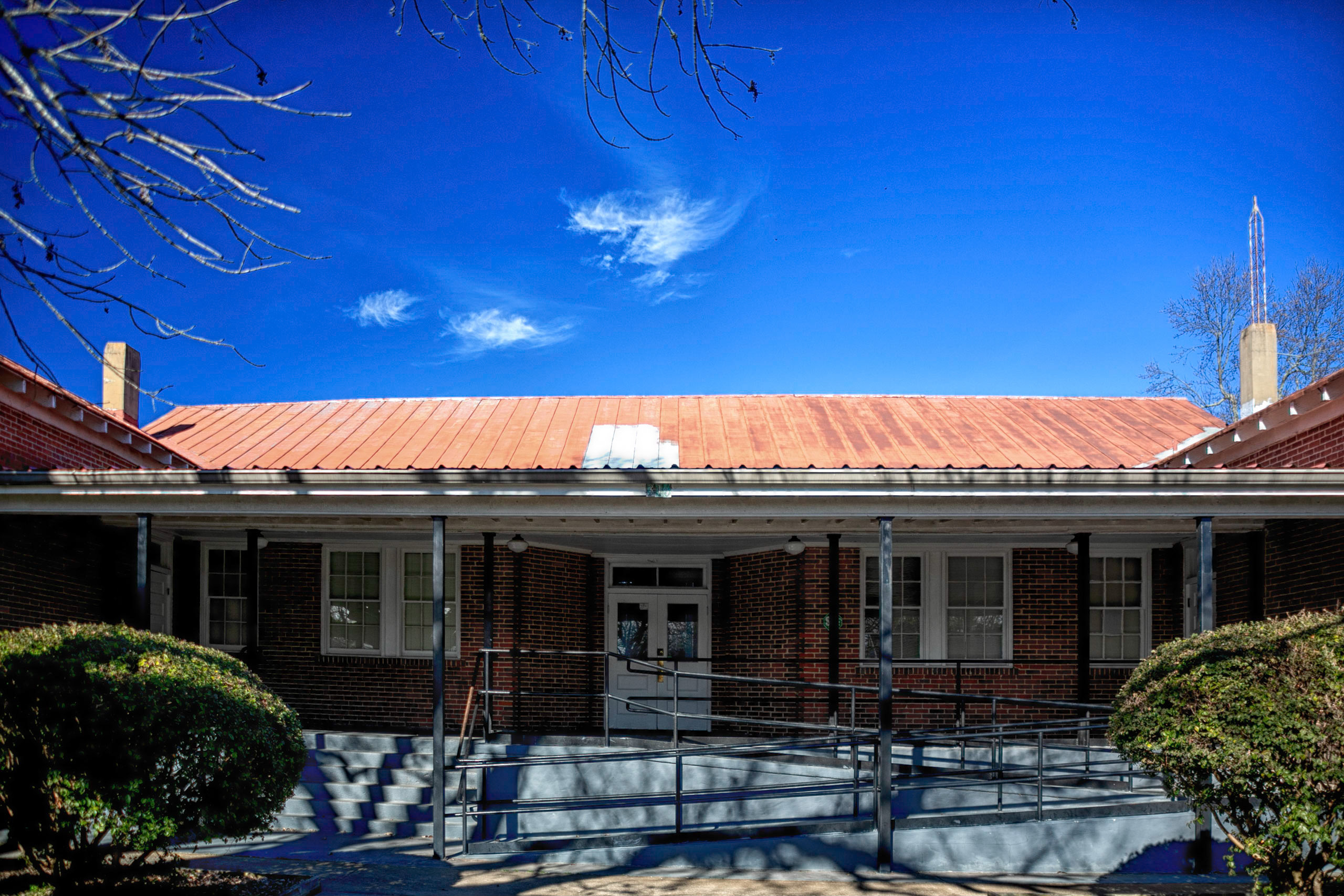

- Location within Georgia
- Location: 316 Hall St. Sandersville, Georgia
- Coordinates: 32°58′38″N 82°48′58″W
- Area: less than one acre
- Built: 1927-28
- Built by: Chafin Construction Co.
- Architectural style: Rosenwald Plan
- NRHP reference No.: 81000202
- Added to NRHP: May 12, 1981

The Thomas Jefferson Elder High and Industrial School, at 316 Hall St. in Sandersville, Georgia, was listed on the National Register of Historic Places in 1981. It is a Rosenwald school built in 1927. It competed in the Georgia Interscholastic Association.

It has an H-shaped plan and is the surviving building of a larger school complex. The site includes the graves of Mr. and Mrs. T.J. Elder.

Its National Register nomination states its importance:

The Thomas Jefferson Elder High and Industrial School is significant as being an authenticated Rosenwald Plan School with an intact H-plan and original interior and exterior finishes. One of the Rosenwald Fund's goals was to improve public education for Southern blacks by assisting in building model schoolhouses. In education, the school is significant as the oldest remaining school building in the county. It was built on a site associated with the county's education since 1889. It pioneered the manual arts (vocational) training and trained other teachers under the leadership of T.J. Elder. In social-humanitarian history, it is significant for the Rosenwald Fund's efforts to improve education in the South. This building was erected with the help of the Fund in 1927-28, although the majority of the costs came from local public support and city funds. It was the Fund's goal to support local school systems by requiring that local funding exceed that of the Fund. In this case, donations in the amounts of $1 to $250 were collected from both blacks and whites. In black history, the school is significant as the manifestation of the efforts of Thomas Jefferson Elder (1869-1946).

It has also been known as the T. J. Elder Elementary School.
