= Soulidifly Productions =

- Company type: Private
- Industry: Media
- Founded: 2017; 9 years ago
- Founder: B. Keith “BK” Fulton
- Headquarters: Richmond, Virginia, United States
- Key people: B. Keith “BK” Fulton (CEO); Monty Ross (President of Film & Production)
- Services: Film production; television production; Publisher
- Website: www.soulidifly.com

Soulidifly Productions is an American media company founded by retired Verizon Communications executive and film producer BK Fulton in 2017. It is a film-making, streaming media, media investment, and book and e-magazine publishing company based in Richmond, Virginia.

== History ==
In 2017 B. Keith “BK” Fulton founded independent film company Soulidifly Productions. Their films tend to focus on multiethnic and multigenerational stories.

American filmmaker Monty Ross serves as the President of Film & Production.

Other Soulidifly Productions products include SoulVision, a monthly e-magazine, and children's book publishing, including the Mr. Business: The Adventures of Little BK series.

More recently they signed a deal with GoMedia Productions.

== Filmography ==
=== Films ===
Year	Film title	Director	Notes
2018	River Runs Red	Wes Miller	Co-produced by Soulidifly Productions
2019	Atone	Wes Miller	Co-produced by Soulidifly Productions
2019	Love Dot Com: The Social Experiment	Charneice Fox	Co-produced by Soulidifly Productions
2019	1 Angry Black Man	Menelek Lumumba	Co-produced by Soulidifly Productions
2019	Hell on the Border	Wes Miller	Co-produced by Soulidifly Productions
2020	The Unity Ride	Monty Ross	Produced as Soulidifly Productions
