= Eva L. Thomas High School =

Defunct high school in College Park, Georgia

Coordinates: 33°39′20″N 84°27′23″W

Eva L. Thomas High School was a high school for African Americans in College Park, Georgia established in 1964, and closed in 1969. It was named after Atlanta Public Schools educator Eva Louise Thomas, who died less than a year before the school opened.

In 1969, the local Board of Education decided to close the school after pressure from the federal government to desegregate, which was met with protests by students and parents. Students moved to schools nearby for the 1970 school year, including the previously all-white College Park High School. The site was repurposed as a middle school until 1980, and currently houses the College Park Elementary School.

The school's basketball team, the Bearcats, won a state championship in 1969. Donald Dollar was the coach. The team competed in the Georgia Interscholastic Association.

A report was published on identifying students with special needs at the school in 1965.
