= James Dean (Georgia politician) =

American social worker and politician

James Edward Dean (March 14, 1944 - December 18, 2014) was a social worker, educator and state legislator who lived in Atlanta, Georgia. He served in the Georgia House of Representatives from 1968 to 1974. His brother Douglas Dean also served as a state representative.

== Biography ==
Dean was born March 14, 1944 in Atlanta to Steve and Dorothy Dean. His father Steve Dean Sr. had 12 children. He graduated from Luther Judson Price High School and Clark College. He earned a Bachelor of Arts in Sociology in 1966 from Clark and then his Master's degree in social work two years later. He married Vyvyan Arden Coleman in 1966 and they had two daughters.

Elected in 1968, he represented DeKalb County, and was listed in the "Who's Who of American Politicians" in 1969. He served until served 1975 as in 1974 he lost re-election to Hosea Williams. He was African American and the first black legislator for DeKalb County. He served while in his 20s.

He introduced a bill stating the right of black police officers to arrest whites. It passed the Georgia House. He was director of the Atlanta Urban League and he organized another political group called The DeKalb County Concerned Citizens for Progressive Government.

He was photographed with a Clark College delegation of officials. He and his wife, Vyvyan Coleman Dean, were photographed c. 1975 at a Clark Atlanta University social event for alumni.

Dean died December 18, 2014 at his home in Atlanta survived by his wife and both daughters.
