= Colored Memorial School and Risley High School =

- U.S. National Register of Historic Places
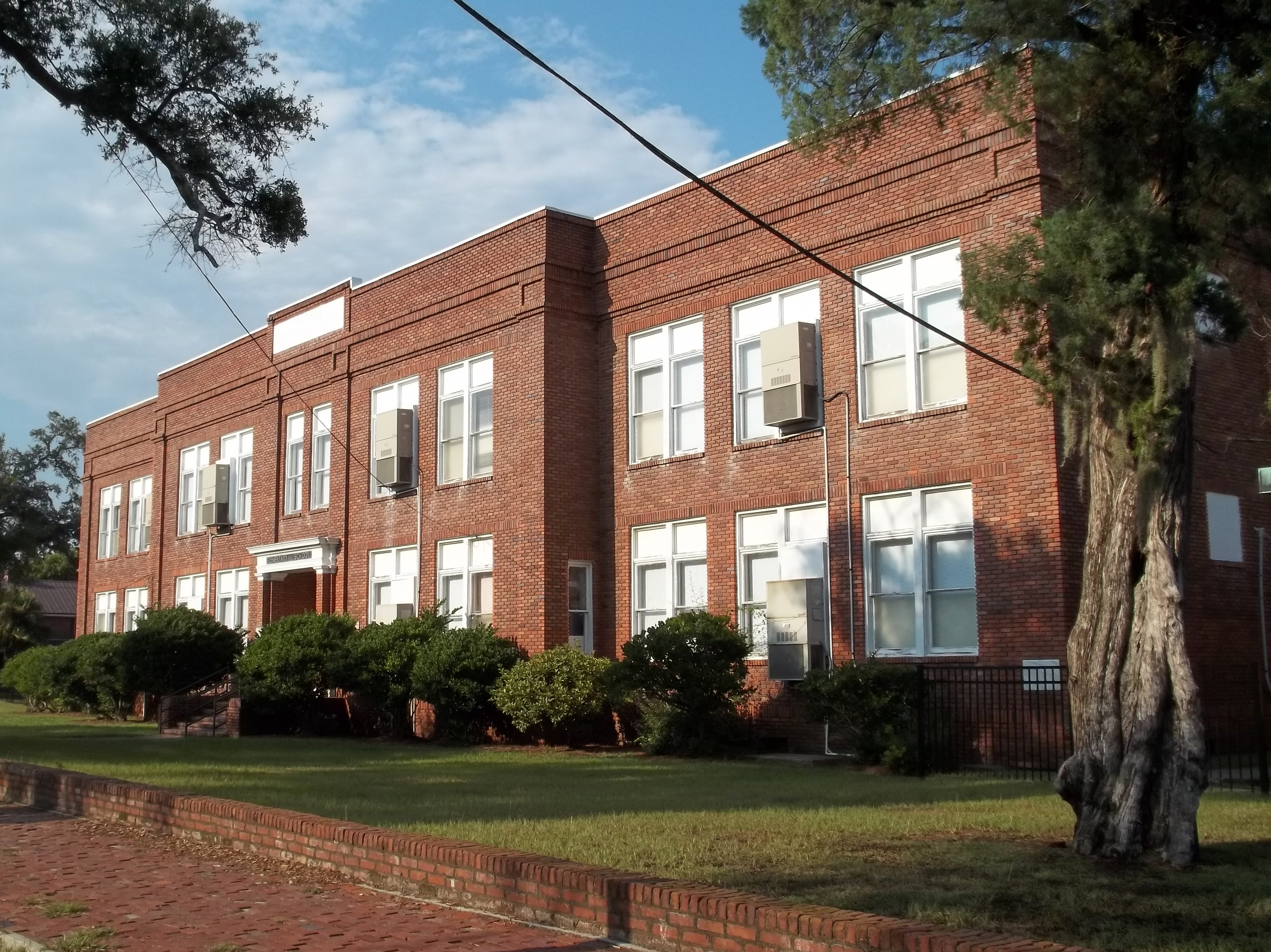
- Colored Memorial School

- Location within Georgia Location within the United States
- Location: 1800 Albany St., Brunswick, Georgia
- Coordinates: 31°09′19″N 81°29′27″W
- Area: 4 acres (1.6 ha)
- Built: 1923
- Architect: Francis L. Abreu
- Architectural style: Classical Revival, Stripped Classical
- NRHP reference No.: 02001290
- Added to NRHP: November 7, 2002

Colored Memorial School and Risley High School is a historic school complex in Brunswick, Georgia where a Freedmen's School opened in 1870. It was added to the National Register of Historic Places on November 7, 2002. It is located at 1800 Albany Street.

Risley High School competed in the Georgia Interscholastic Association. It won the state championship in basketball in 1969.

== Photos ==
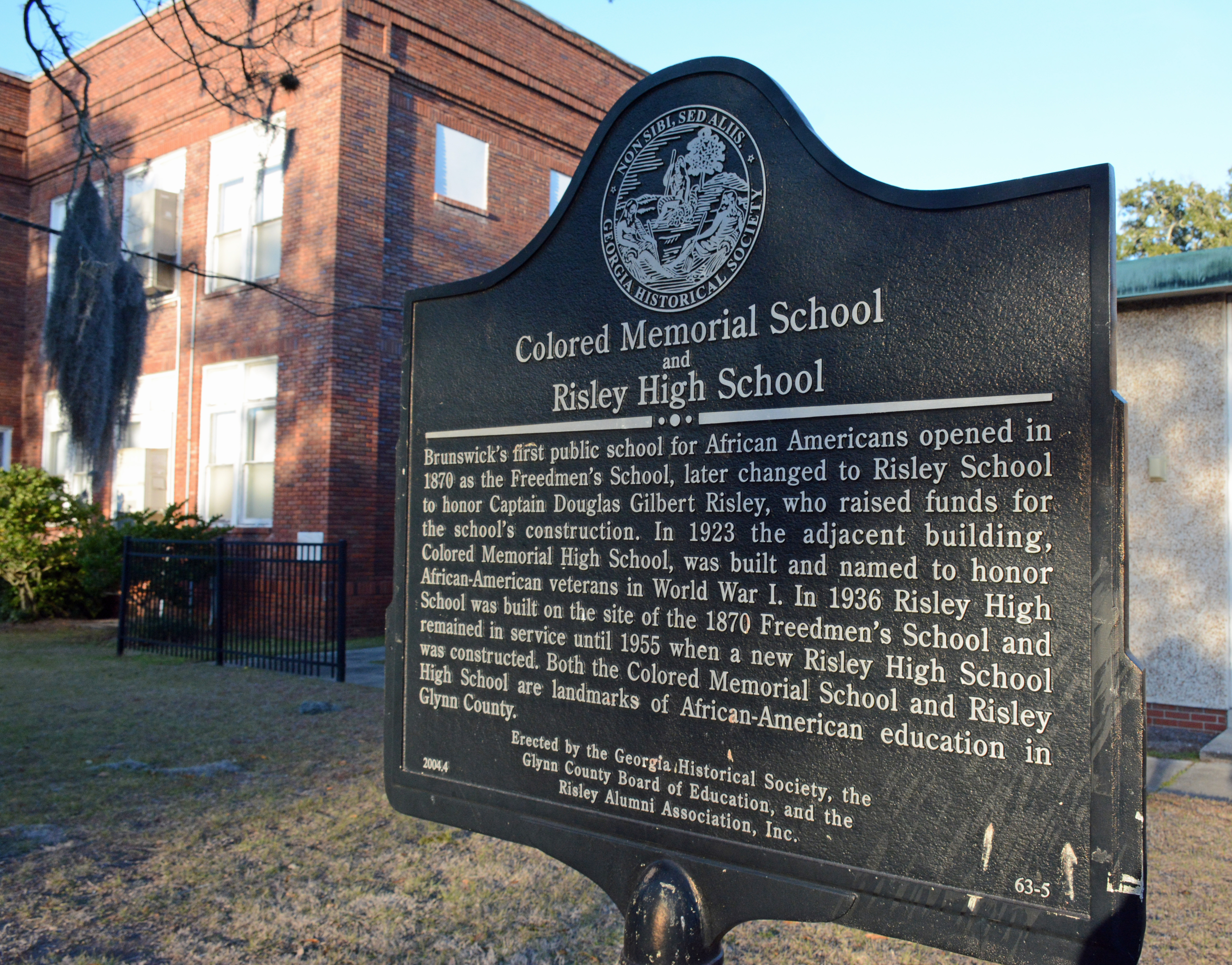
Historical marker, Colored Memorial School in the background

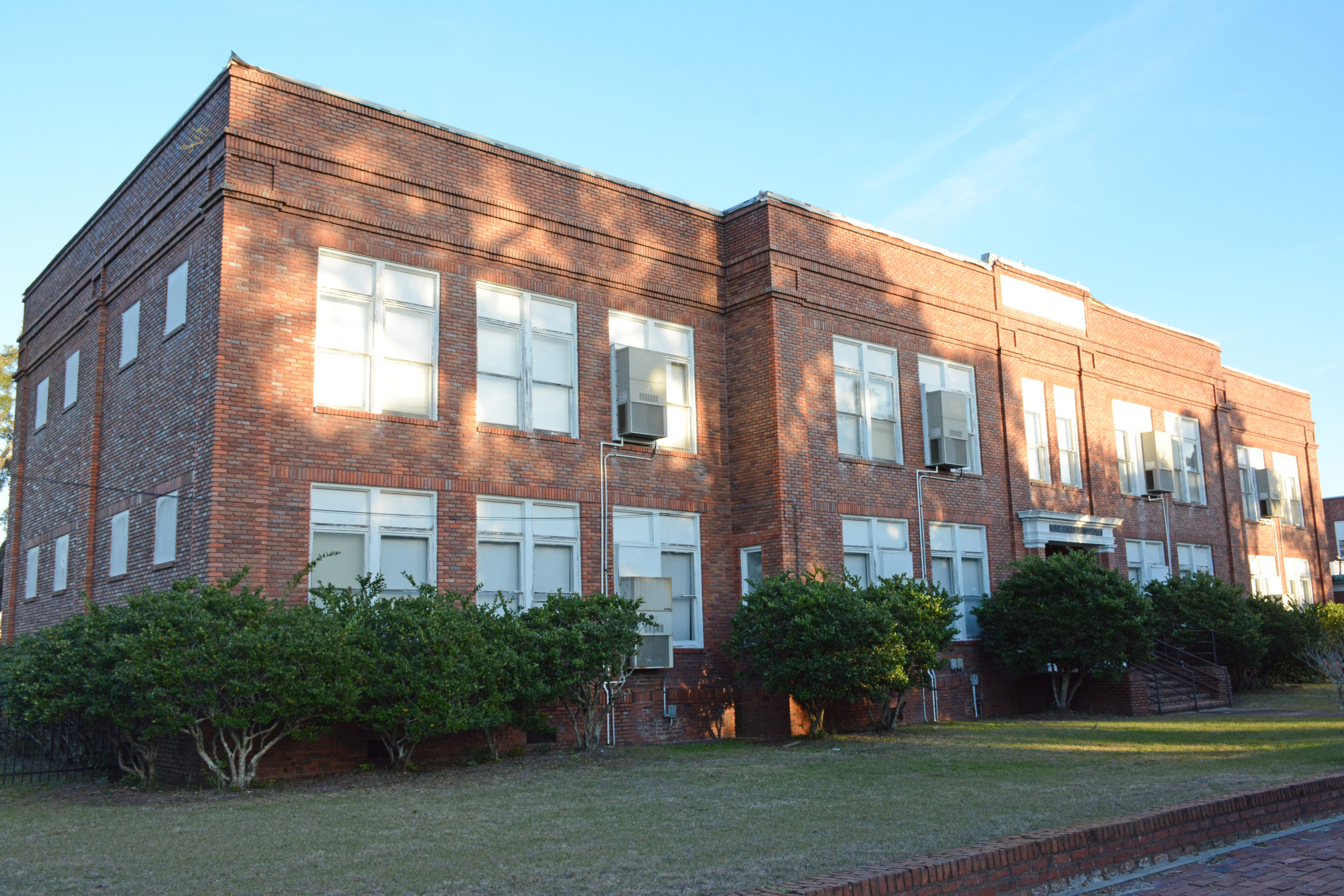
Colored Memorial School

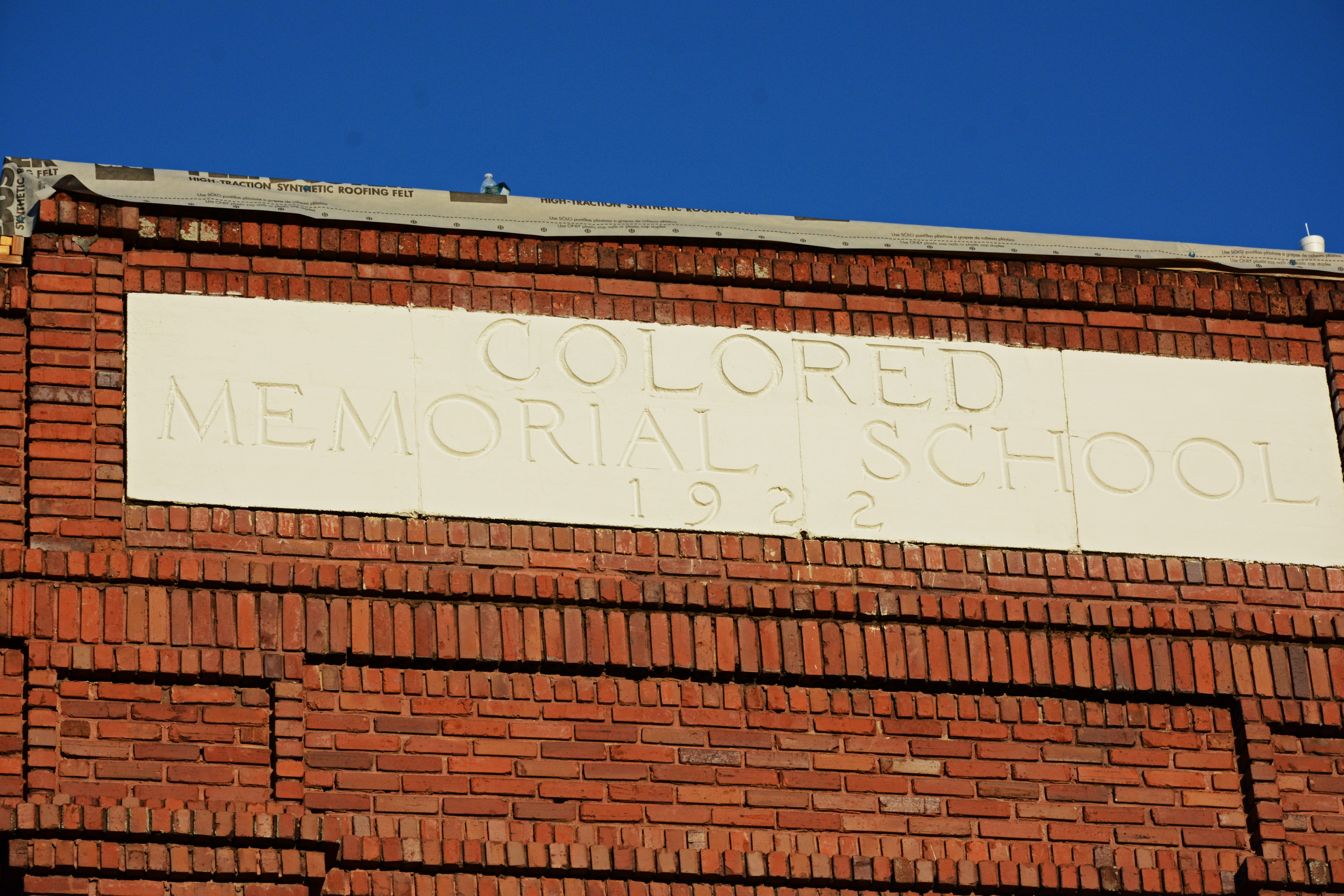
Top of Colored Memorial School

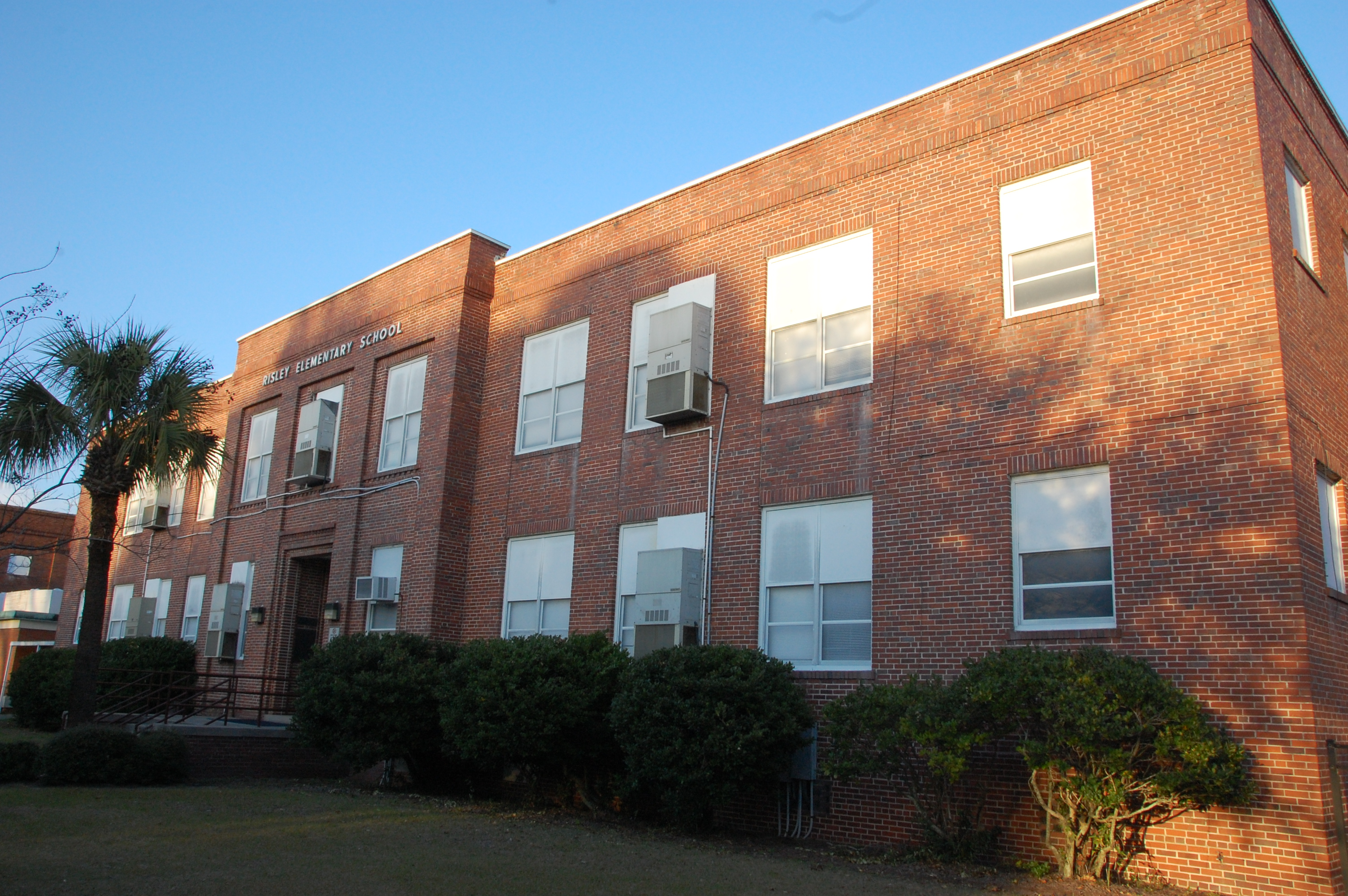
Risley High School building, the Colored Memorial School is visible on the left

== See also ==
- National Register of Historic Places listings in Glynn County, Georgia
