= Monty Ross =

American filmmaker (born 1957)

- Born: March 7, 1957 (age 69); Omaha, Nebraska, U.S.
- Education: Clark Atlanta University (BA)
- Occupations: Film producer; film director; studio executive; actor
- Years active: 1977–present
- Organization: 40 Acres and a Mule Filmworks

Monty Austin Ross (born March 7, 1957) is an American film producer and director. He is the co-founder of 40 Acres and a Mule Filmworks alongside Spike Lee and has produced She's Gotta Have It (1986), School Daze (1988), Do the Right Thing (1989), Mo' Better Blues (1990), Jungle Fever (1991), Malcolm X (1992), Crooklyn (1994) and Clockers (1995).

== Early life ==
Monty Austin Ross was born on March 7, 1957, in Omaha, Nebraska, the second child of Gladys Ross (née Drew; 1932–1999), a social worker and Ewing Ross (1923–1970), a minister and owner of a hardware store.

== Filmmaking ==
Ross is an acclaimed independent filmmaker who co-produced films with Spike Lee, with whom he co-founded 40 Acres and a Mule Filmworks. They first met at Morehouse College as freshman. After class, Ross found himself enjoying Clark College, now Clark Atlanta University. It was there Ross was involved in theatre with the Clark College Players under the direction of Joan Lewis, Department Chair of Theatre Arts who prepared her students and the CC Players for the world of professional theatre with a stern, but caring approach. Ross, “She was demanding, a true leader. She taught as all the many ins and outs of becoming professional artists. She demanded that we leave a legacy of excellence that encouraged others to be productive. I love and respected her.” Both took mass media courses and were student members of a film club known as the AUC Newsreel. They perfected their film writing and production skills while Spike was enrolled in nearby Morehouse College and Monty later continued his studies at Bishop College in Dallas, Texas (defunct) and finally graduated from CAU in 1980. Ross appeared as a barber in Lee's master's degree thesis film, Joe's Bed-Stuy Barbershop: We Cut Heads. He co-produced many films with Lee through the 1980s and 1990s, including She's Gotta Have It, School Daze, Do the Right Thing, Mo' Better Blues, Jungle Fever, Malcolm X, Crooklyn and Clockers.

Following the production of Clockers, Ross independently completed several works. Among the film projects he served as a lead on, were as producer of Keep the Faith, Baby, a biopic about Adam Clayton Powell Jr. He also produced Escaping Jersey and directed Reasons during this period.

On rejoining 40 Acres, Ross became the coordinator for the company's community outreach programs, recruiting interns to assist with the production of Inside Man. Ross has completed work with Spike Lee on the "She's Gotta Have It TV Spin-off of the movie that he co-produced. Ross is also a college professor, serving as an adjunct professor, lecturer and frequent guest speaker at universities including VCU, Old Dominion, Clark Atlanta, and Florida A&M University.

In 2019, Ross directed The Opera Game (now titled Scandalous Moves), set in the 19th century in New Orleans, LA. The film won the Filmmakers Choice award at the 2019 San Diego Black Film Festival.

From 2017 to 2022, Ross served as the President of Operations for Soulidifly Productions. The collaborations produced included 1 Angry Blackman, Love Dot Com: The Social Experiment, and River Runs Red. In 2022, he served as the Filmmaker-in-Residence at Ours Studios LLC, a Black-owned and Decatur, GA-based film production company that released its first historical documentary, As If We Were Ghosts. The 60-minute documentary debuted June 2022 on Georgia Public Broadcasting.

Ross writes about his experiences in the film industry and offer suggestions to others at suite57.com. He has recommended that emerging filmmakers explore their immigration first to make their content, stating that “AI technologies shouldn't have all the fun of discovering new and exciting ways to tell your audience about stories that are exciting to you.”

In October 2025, it was announced that Ross was returning to filmmaking with the release of a 47-minute documentary called Let Me Put This BUG In Your Ear: The John ‘Peterbug’ Matthews Story.

== Theatre ==
As well as filmmaking, Ross was also involved with Atlanta Street Theatre, where he spent some of his early career as an actor.

== Personal life ==
Ross was born in Omaha, Nebraska. His parents divorced when he was young. He was married to Carol Ross.

Since 2015, he has picked up the hobby of painting. An avid watercolorist, he is looking forward to exhibiting his work on suite57.com.

== Filmography ==
Year	Title	Notes
1983	Joe's Bed-Stuy Barbershop: We Cut Heads	Student film, main role
1986	She's Gotta Have It	Co-producer
1988	School Daze	Co-producer
1989	Do The Right Thing	Co-producer
1990	Mo' Better Blues	Co-producer
1992	Malcolm X	Co-producer
1991	Jungle Fever	Co-producer
1994	Crooklyn	Co-producer
1995	Clockers	Co-producer
2002	Keep the Faith, Baby	Co-producer
2006	Inside Man	Internship Coordinator
2018	1 Angry Blackman	Co-producer
2018	River Runs Red	Co-producer
2019	Love Dot Com	Co-producer
2019	The Opera Game	Co-director
2022	As If We Were Ghosts	Director
