= Ballard School =

- U.S. National Register of Historic Places
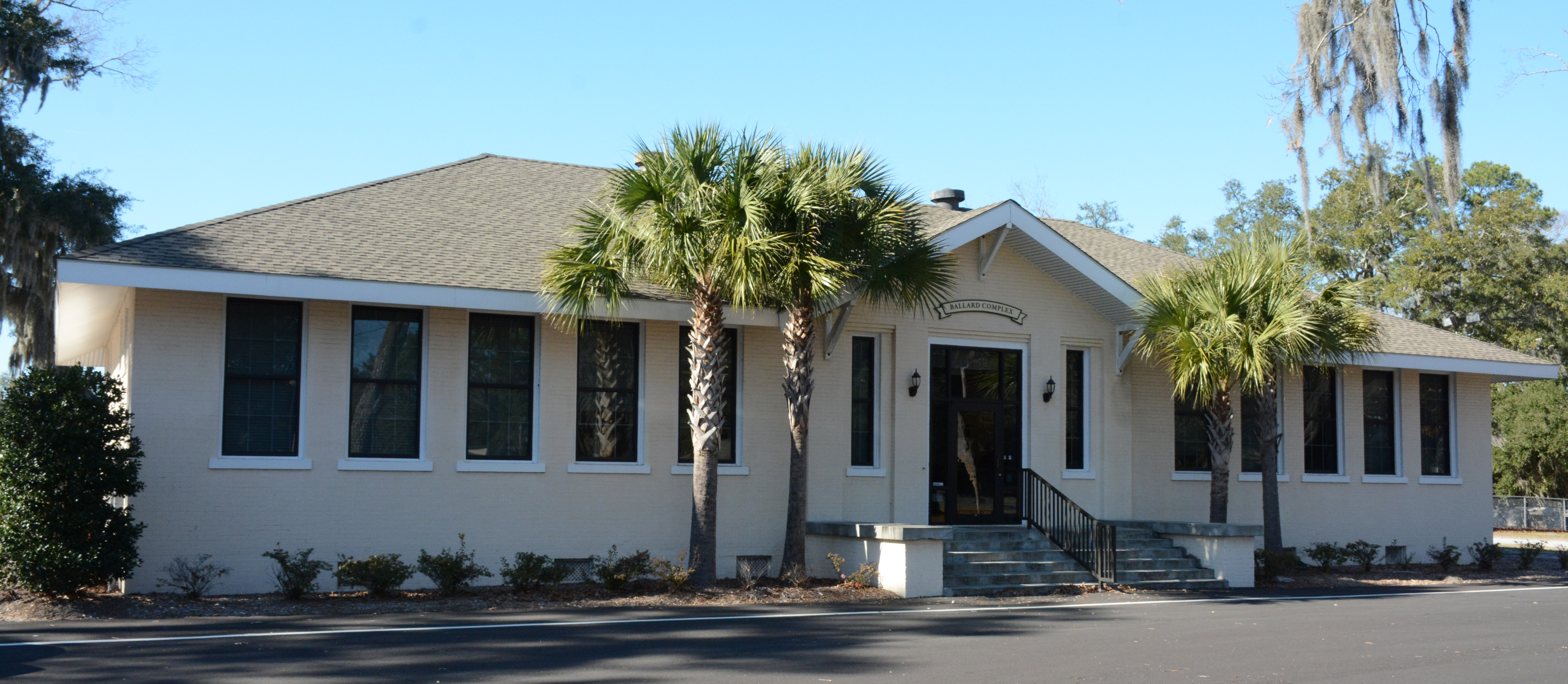
- Ballard Elementary School

- Location within Georgia Location within the United States
- Location: 323 Old Jesup Hwy., Brunswick, Georgia
- Coordinates: 31°12′17″N 81°30′22″W
- Area: 9 acres (3.6 ha)
- Built: 1915
- NRHP reference No.: 04001181
- Added to NRHP: October 27, 2004

Ballard School, also known as Ballard Elementary School, is a historic school building in Brunswick, Georgia. It was added to the National Register of Historic Places on October 27, 2004. It is located at 325 Old Jesup Highway. The Ballard Elementary School was built in ca. 1910s and was known as the County Community School. In the 1920s an annex was connected to the original building by a breezeway. The school was renovated in 2009 and is rented out for conferences and meetings.

== See also ==
- National Register of Historic Places listings in Glynn County, Georgia
