= Douglas Dean =

American state legislator

Douglas C. Dean is a former state legislator in Georgia. He served in the Georgia House of Representatives from 1998 to 2006. His brother James Dean also served in the state legislature and was the first African American elected to the legislature from DeKalb County.

== Early life and education ==
Dean was born to Steve and Dorothy (Cox) Dean and was one of 12 children, along with his brother James E. Dean.

Dean received a Bachelor of Arts in Business Administration from Pasadena City College.

== Career ==
A lifetime resident of Summerhill, Atlanta, Dean led the Summerhill Neighborhood Development Corporation that got a cut of parking revenue at the Atlanta Braves' former Turner Field stadium. The group funded the Summerhill Reunion festival. A lawsuit accused him of misusing the organizations finds to back a private developer's loan that defaulted.

He was photographed at a press conference discussing substandard housing.

He led the Pittsburgh Community Improvement Association and was photographed in 2012 at a press conference discussing a man's beating caught on video.

In 2004 he was elected from District 59.

== Personal life ==
Dean lives in Summerhill, Atlanta with his wife and two children.

He was arrested in 2017 along with several other protestors at Georgia State University advocating for low income housing and community involvement in a redevelopment project.

== See also ==
- 134th Georgia General Assembly
