= Gascoigne Bluff =

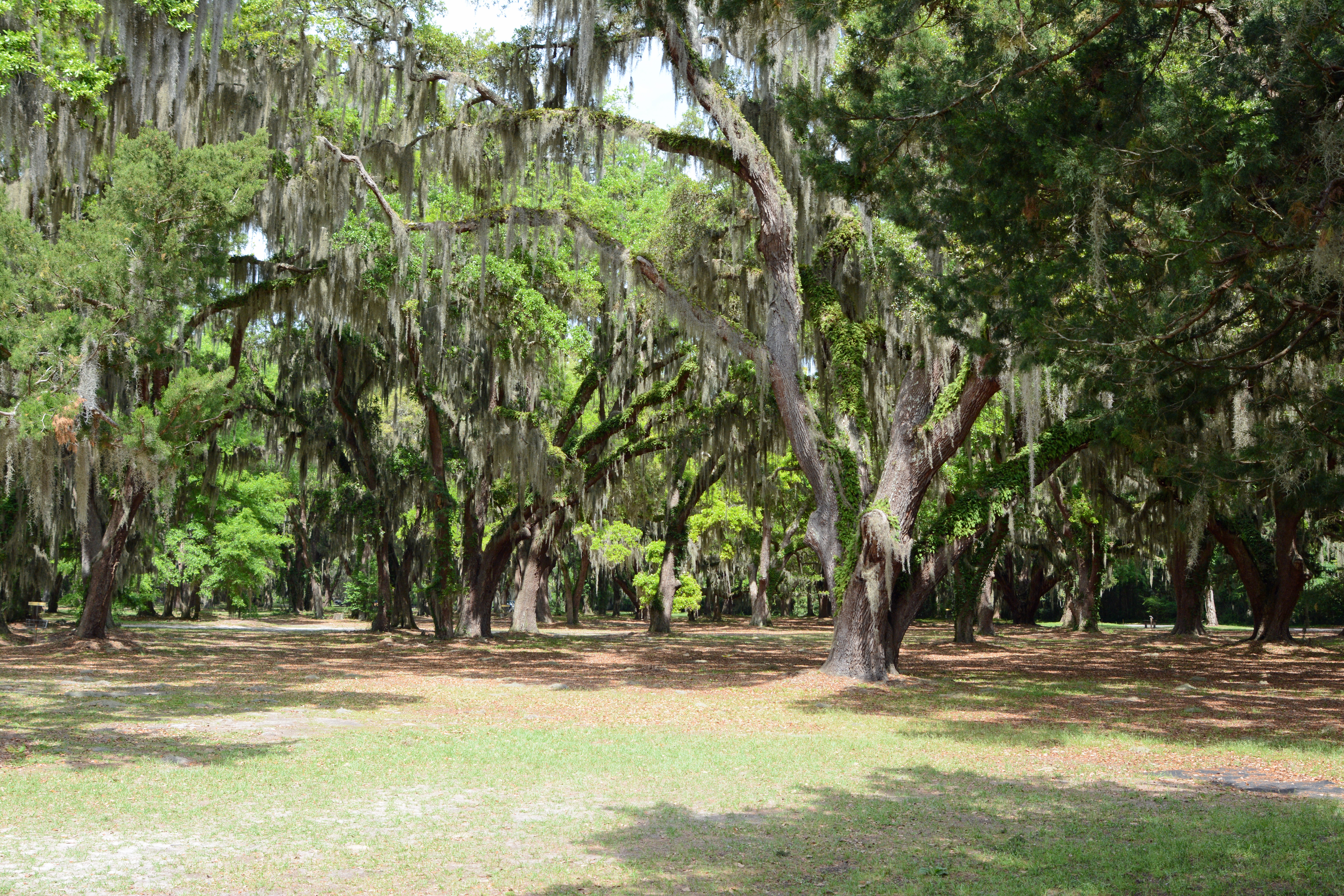
Gascoigne Bluff

Gascoigne Bluff is a bluff next to the Frederica River on the western side of the island of St. Simons, Georgia which was a Native American campground, the site of a Franciscan monastery named San Buenaventura, and the site of the Province of Georgia's first naval base.

It was named for Captain James Gascoigne of the sloop-of-war, HMS Hawk, which led some of the first British settlers to the coast of Georgia.

Timber harvested from 2,000 southern live oak trees from Gascoigne Bluff was used to build the USS Constitution and the five other original US Navy frigates, under the Naval Act of 1794. The Constitution is known as "Old Ironsides" for the way the cannonballs bounced off the hard oak planking.

This area was one of several St. Simons Island plantations owned by John Couper (father of James Hamilton Couper, see below) who lived at Cannon Point, St. Simons Island, and who donated his library of 20,000 volumes to the Library of Congress.

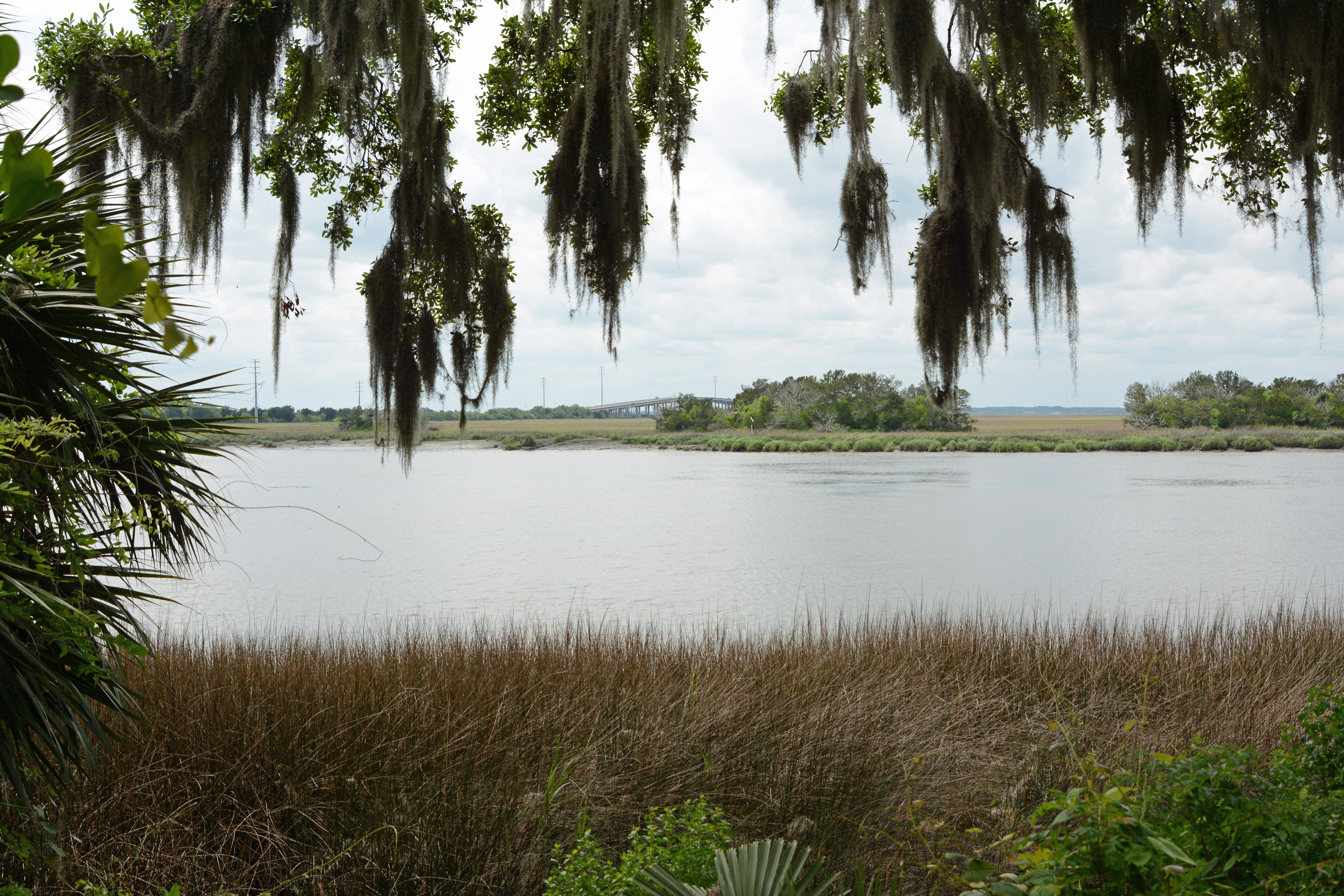
View from the bluff

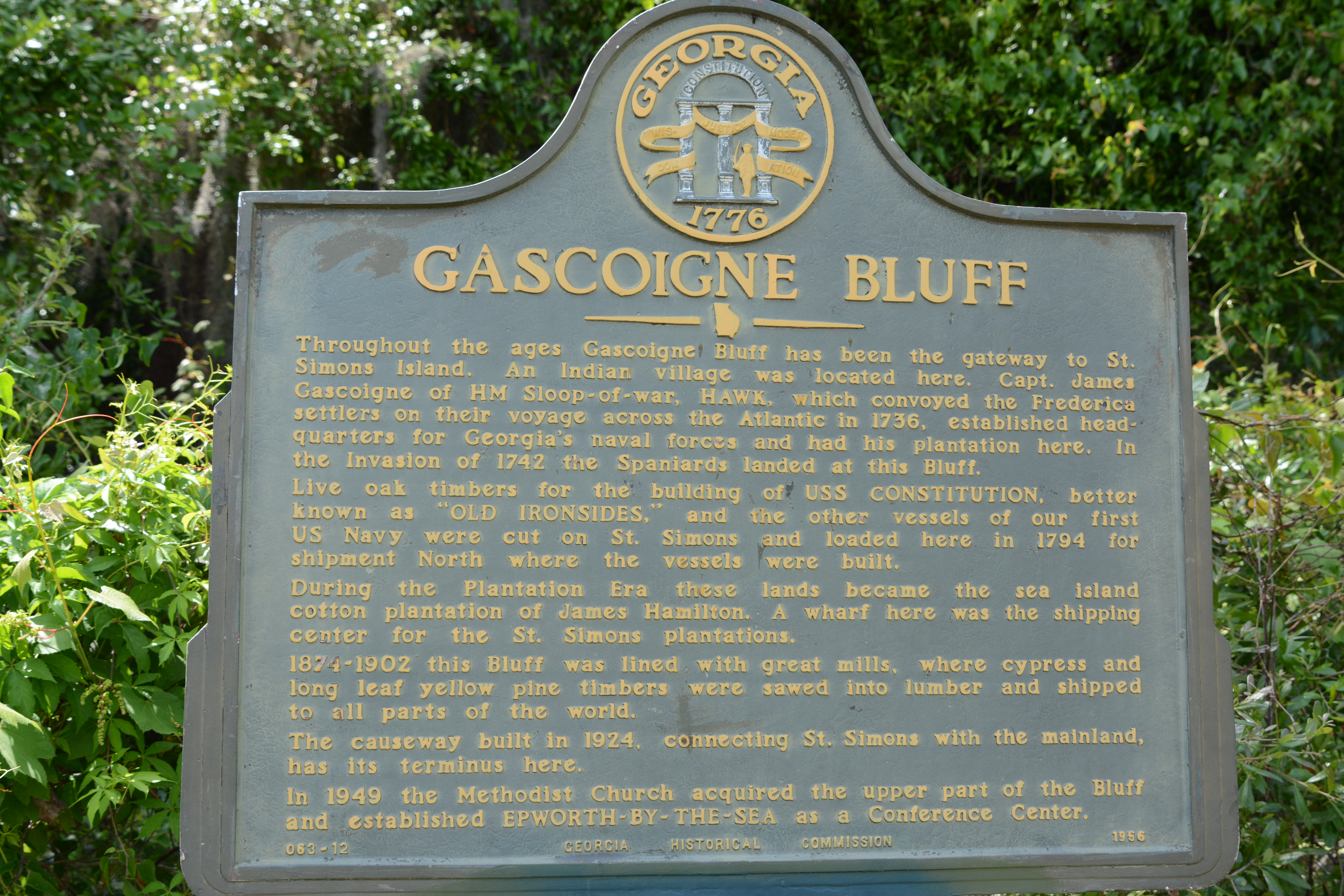
Historical marker

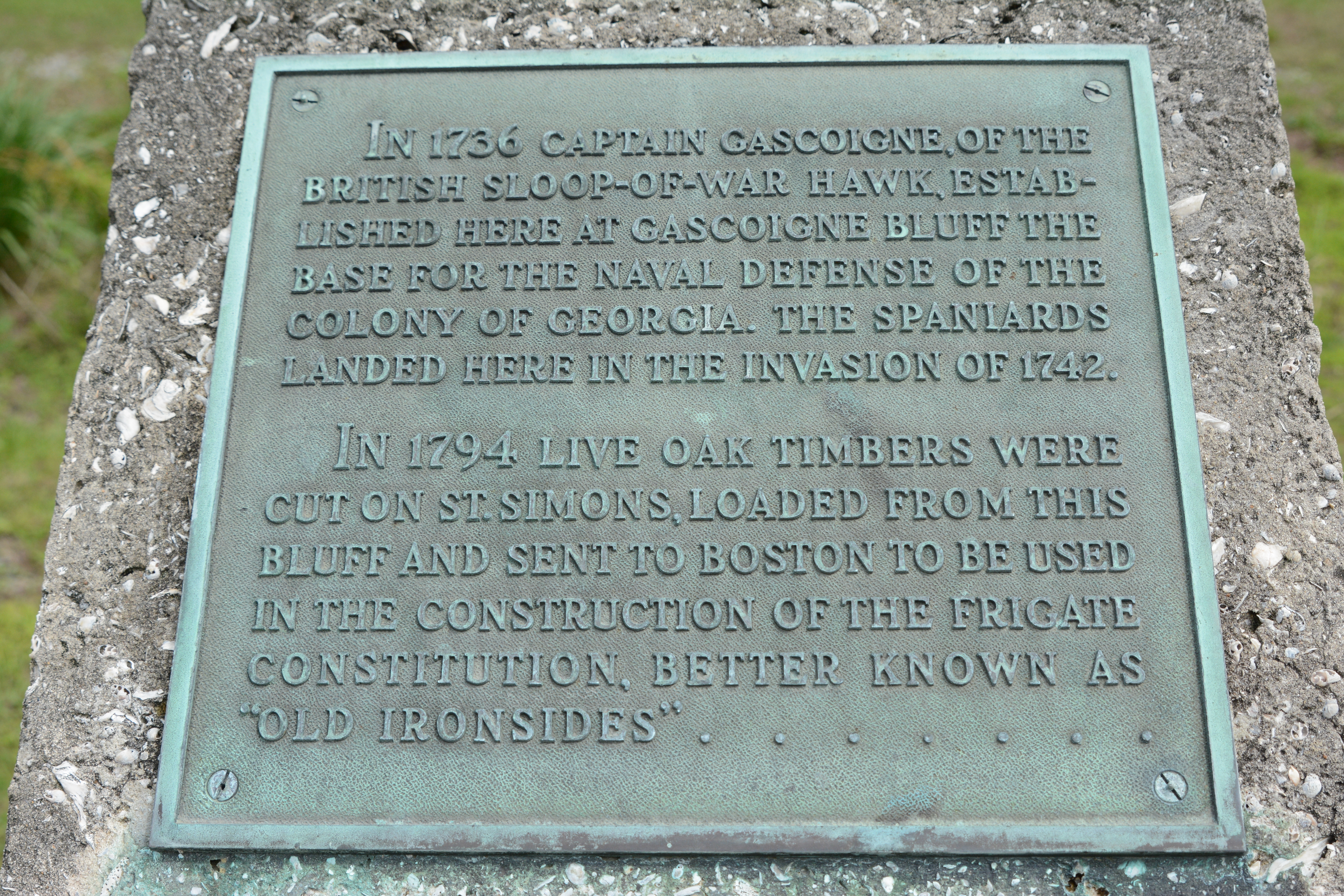
Marker

== Hamilton Plantation ==
- Hamilton Plantation Slave Cabins
- U.S. National Register of Historic Places
- U.S. Historic district
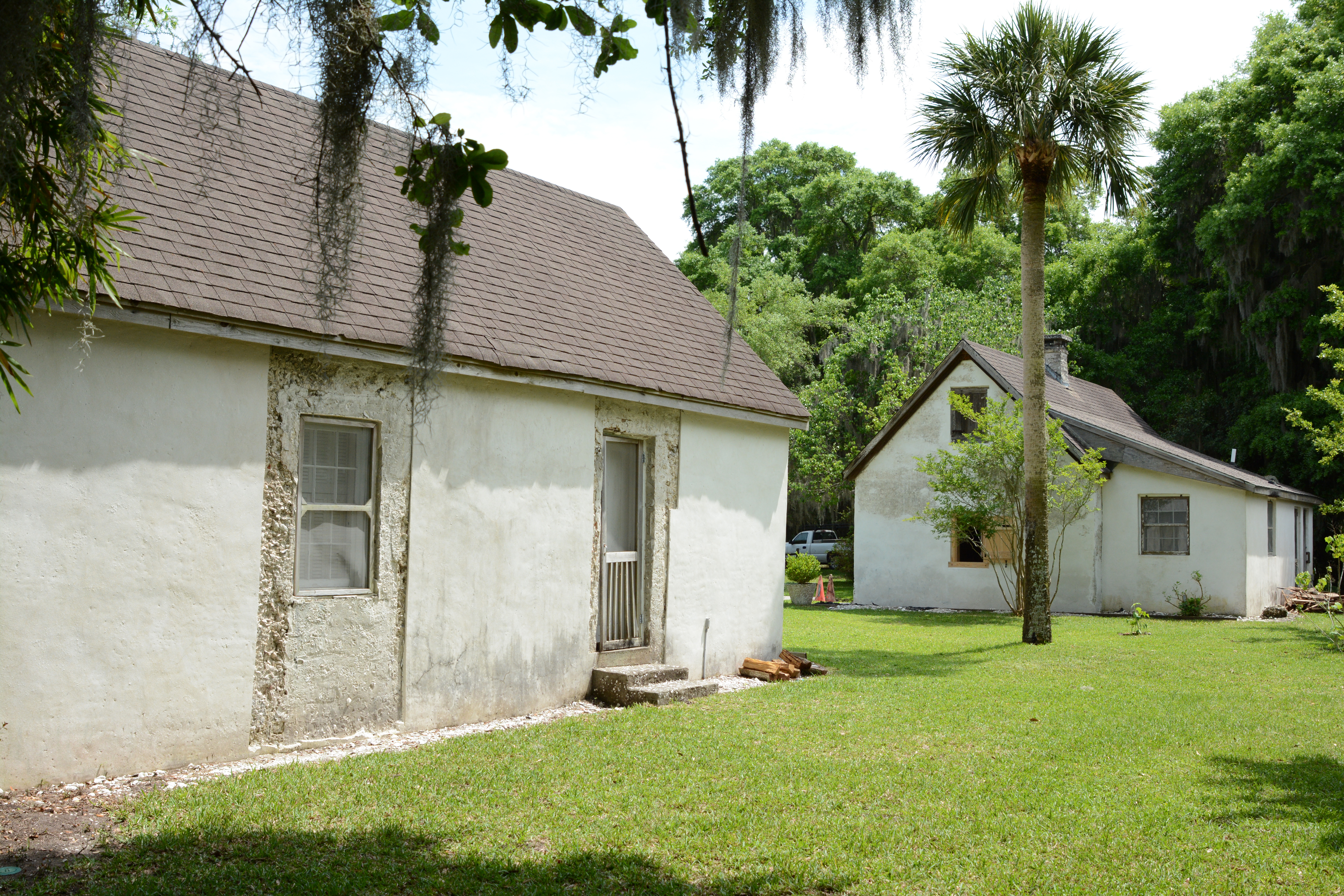
- Hamilton Plantation slave houses (river view side)

- Location within Georgia Location within the United States
- Nearest city: St. Simons Island, Georgia
- Coordinates: 31.17106°N 81.40771°W
- Area: 1.7 acres (0.69 ha)
- Built: 1832
- Architect: Couper, James Hamilton
- NRHP reference No.: 88000968
- Added to NRHP: June 30, 1988

The remains of this antebellum-era plantation contain two surviving slave cabins, which were part of a set of four built before 1833. Among the better examples of surviving slave cabins in the South, they are composed of tabby, a cement consisting of lime, water, and crushed oyster shells. The cabins have built-in windows and a central chimney.

James Hamilton Couper, namesake of the owner and manager of the plantation, was an architect and a builder. He designed and built the cabins to house the slaves who served in the plantation's main house. Utilizing a duplex plan to house more than one family, the cabins were originally part of a planned community of slave dwellings.

The Hamilton Plantation and Gasciogne Bluff were sold after the Civil War to Anson Dodge and the Georgia Land and Lumber Company of New York in 1874 to erect lumber mills.

The Cassina Garden Club owns the cabins and offers tours on Wednesday mornings in June through August. The cabins are near Arthur J. Moore Drive.

== See also ==
- National Register of Historic Places listings in Glynn County, Georgia
