= Monitor Elementary-High School =

Location
- South Monitor Drive; Fitzgerald, Georgia; United States
- 31.7085196°N 83.2429320°W

Information
- Grades: 1-12
- Colours: Burgundy and gold
- Mascot: Eagle

Monitor Elementary-High School was a segregated public school for African Americans in Fitzgerald, Georgia, United States. Its last graduating class was in 1967.

== History ==
Monitor Elementary School was first located at the corner of Ocmulgee Street and Walden Avenue in Fitzgerald, Georgia. However, due to the growing African American community and the deterioration of the old school, the Board of Education approved the construction of a new school. The new school site was located on South Monitor Drive. The building was completed in 1927.

The new school was called Fitzgerald Public School, and later it was called Monitor High School. Professor D.S. Collins was named as principal. There were eight teachers on staff, and the new school consisted of seven classrooms for academic subjects and one home economics room. In 1931, the first graduating class included three students. The second graduating class consisted of one student. In 1939 a new building was added to the school site. Called the "High School Building," this structure included a library. Later, a home economics building and an elementary classroom building were added. The funds for the new buildings were from the Julius Rosenwald Fund, an education foundation.

=== Integration ===
The school year of 1966-67 was a new beginning for some of the Monitor students. Ten students chose to attend Fitzgerald High School, which at this time was an all-white school. According to G. Marie Rodwell-Bryant, this was one of the worst experiences in her life. She notes many of the same hardships faced by other African American students at that time, who first integrated into previously all-white schools. Bryant explained that she had to try extra hard to keep up in her studies. The books used at Monitor were out of date, so the books used by Fitzgerald High were so advanced by comparison, that they seemed almost foreign to her. The class of 1967 was the last to graduate from Monitor High School. The next year, Fitzgerald school system became completely integrated.

Today, a portion of the building still stands and is now the site of the Monitor Enrichment Program, an after-school program for area youth.

Full integration in Fitzgerald did not take place until the 1968 school year. The seniors from Monitor and Queensland were sent to Fitzgerald High School in the 1967–1968 school year. Monitor and Queensland's schools went to the eleventh grade that year.

== Extracurricular activities ==
The school colors were burgundy and gold. The mascot was an Eagle. The school had men's basketball and football teams. Other activities included drama, business club, marching band, interpretive dance, and chorus.

An annual May Day festival was a day of fun and activities for the students, faculty and parents.

It was school tradition for each graduation class to leave the school a token of appreciation. The class of 1939 left a wall clock for the new high school.

The class of 1939 was the first graduating class to begin the first grade through the senior year, which was the eleventh grade.
