= Luther Judson Price =

American businessman and civil rights activist

- Born: April 24, 1856; Sunnyside, Georgia, U.S.
- Died: July 3, 1936 (aged 80); Atlanta, Georgia, U.S.
- Occupation: Postmaster
- Spouse: Minnie Georgiana Wright

Luther Judson Price (April 24, 1856 – July 3, 1936) was a businessman and civil rights activist who served as the postmaster in South Atlanta from 1889. His home is being renovated and restored. Luther Judson Price High School in Atlanta was named for him. It is now a middle school.

He was enslaved. Price was among the first graduates of Clark College. He belonged to the Methodist Episcopal Church. He was assistant treasurer of the Epworth League. He married and had five children.

Luther Judson Price High School was established in the mid-1950s by the Atlanta Public School System, the fifth high school for Black students in Atlanta. In 1987 the school changed from a high school to a middle school. After enrollment dropped it was converted to Luther J. Price Middle School. Alumni include state legislator James E. Dean.

In 2022, the Price home was the subject of Season 44 of This Old House.
