= Strachan House Garage =

- U.S. National Register of Historic Places
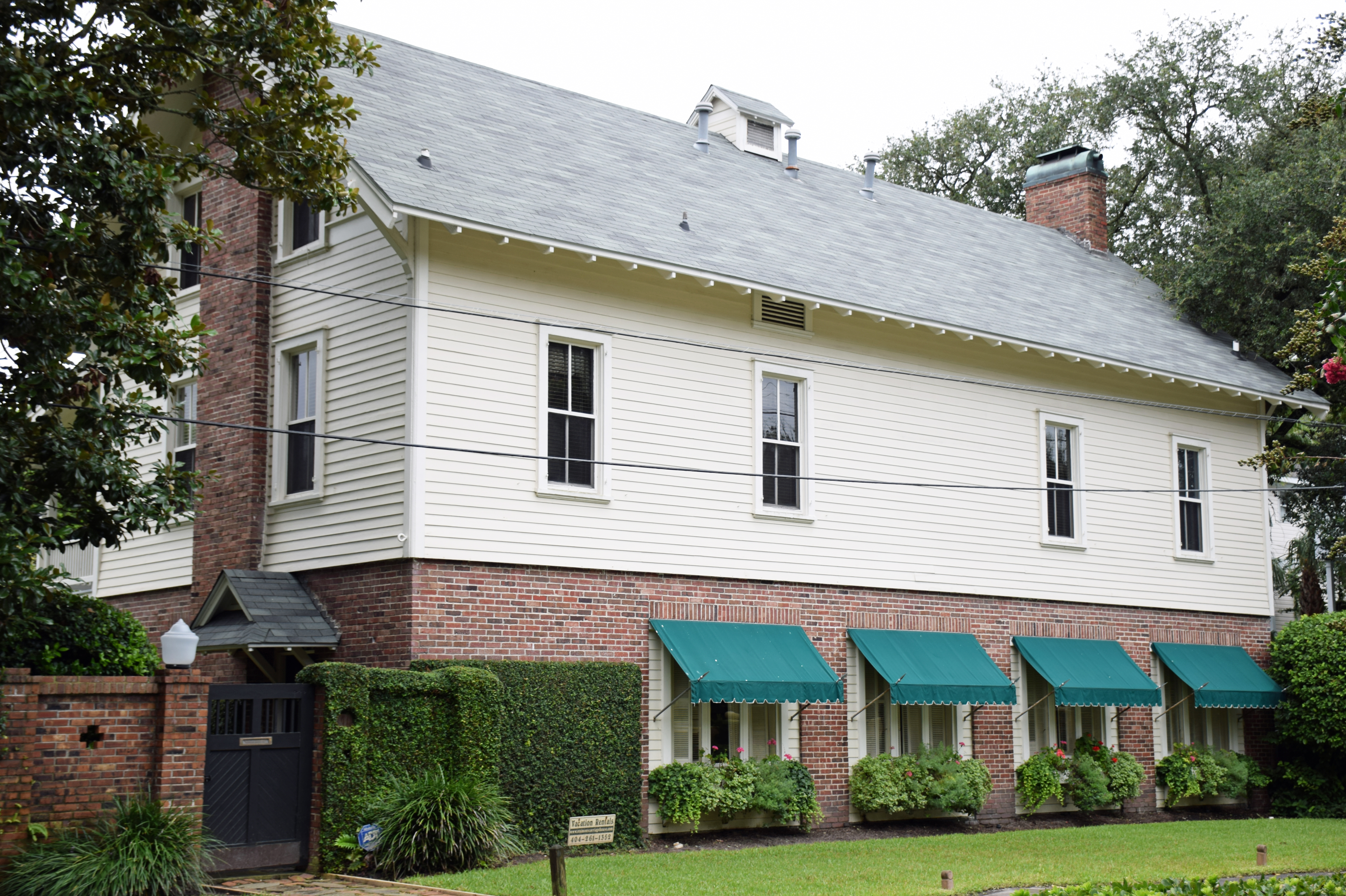

- Location within Georgia Location within the United States
- Location: 414 1/2 Butler Ave., St. Simons Island, Glynn County, Georgia
- Coordinates: 31°8′7″N 81°23′53″W
- Area: 0.3 acres (0.12 ha)
- Built: c. 1925
- Architectural style: Bungalow/craftsman, Late 19th And Early 20th Century American Movements
- NRHP reference No.: 97000660
- Added to NRHP: July 3, 1997

The Strachan House Garage, at 414-1/2 Butler Ave. on St. Simons Island in Glynn County, Georgia, is a two-story garage and residence which was built circa 1925. It was listed on the National Register of Historic Places in 1997. The listing included two contributing buildings.

It was originally part of a resort estate which no longer exists. Its first story is brick and its second story is wood. It was converted to residential-only in 1978 and was renovated further in 1987.
