= Fitzgerald High School College and Career Academy (Georgia) =

Public high school in Fitzgerald, Georgia, United States

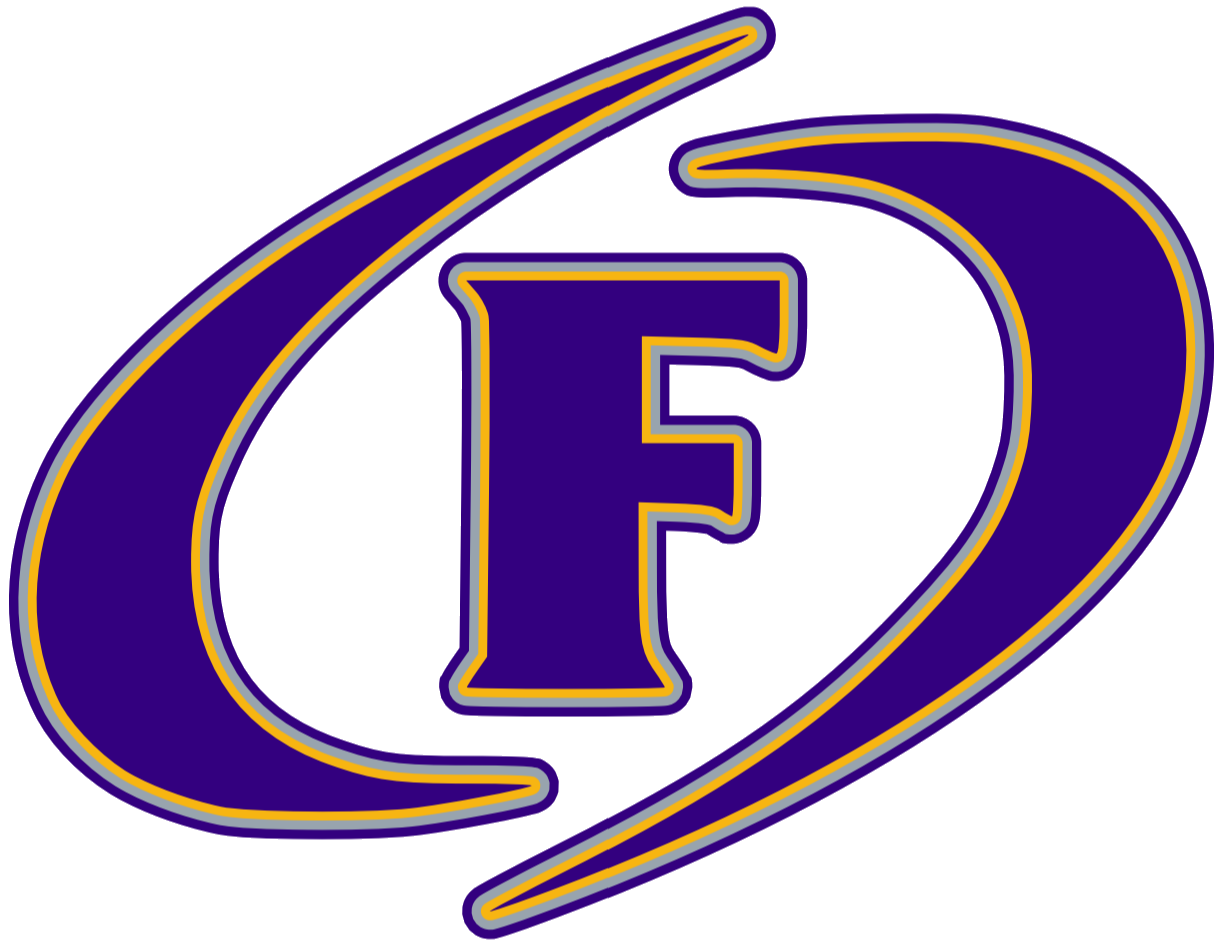

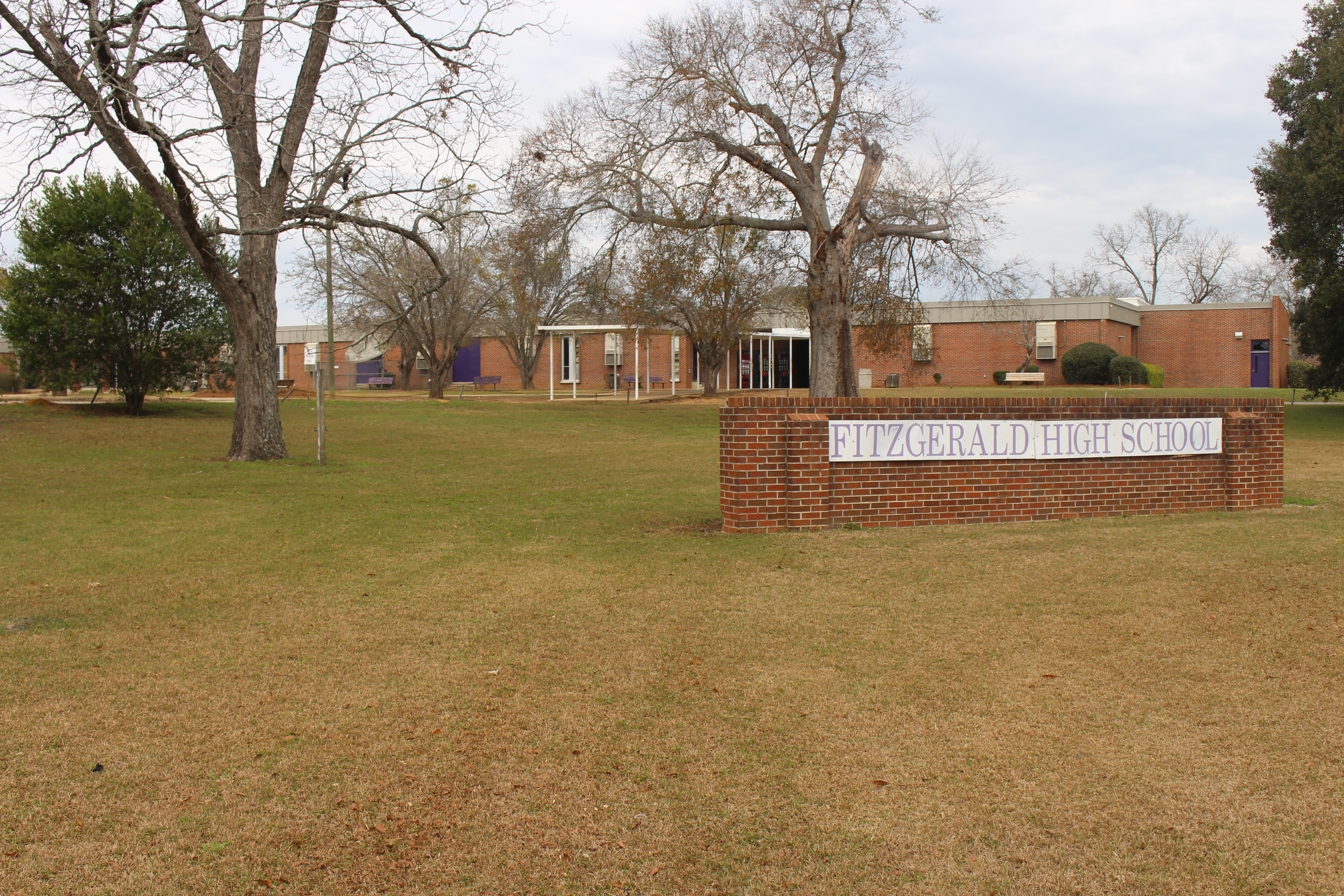
- Fitzgerald High School in 2017

Location
- 553 Ocilla Highway, Fitzgerald, Georgia 31750; United States; 31°40′21″N 83°14′33″W

Information
- Motto: "Graduation for all students is the key to our future, and requires a commitment by all students and teachers."
- Opened: 1973 (53 years ago)
- School district: Ben Hill County School District
- CEEB code: 111280
- Principal: John Gamble
- Teaching staff: 61.00 (FTE)
- Grades: 9–12
- Enrollment: 874 (2023-2024)
- Student to teacher ratio: 14.33
- Colors: Purple and gold
- Slogan: Investing In Futures
- Fight song: "Notre Dame Victory March"
- Sports: Region 1, A Division I of GHSA
- Team name: Purple Hurricanes
- Rival: Irwin County High School
- Accreditation: Southern Association of Colleges and Schools
- Website: fhscca.ben-hill.k12.ga.us

Fitzgerald High School College and Career Academy (FHSCCA) is the local high school in Fitzgerald, Georgia, United States. A part of the Ben Hill County School District, it serves students in grades 9–12. Fitzgerald High School is currently involved in the Title I Plan.

== Athletics ==
Fitzgerald High School College and Career Academy competes in the Class AA division of the Georgia High School Association in football, cross country (boys' and girls'), softball, competitive cheerleading, basketball (boys' and girls'), wrestling, riflery, baseball, track (boys' and girls'), soccer (boys' and girls'), tennis (boys' and girls'), competitive weightlifting, and golf (boys' and girls'). Sports teams are known as the Fitzgerald Purple Hurricanes, or simply the Canes. The Purple Hurricane Athletic Department also fields football cheerleading and basketball cheerleading squads.

The Fitzgerald Purple Hurricane Athletic Department won the Georgia Athletic Director Association's Region Director's Cup for the 2015-2016 school year. The Purple Hurricanes compete in Region 1-AA.

== Past accomplishments ==
FHSCCA has won four state championship weightlifting titles.

The FHSCCA competition cheer team won a cheerleading state championship in 2005. The "Purple Girls" have won 15 consecutive region titles.

The Fitzgerald Purple Hurricane men's track team won four consecutive state titles (1988, 1989, 1990, and 1991). In 2015, the FHS men's track team finished as the state runner-up.

The Purple Hurricanes Football team won the state GHSA AA State Championship in 2021.
